= 2010–11 Boston Bruins season =

Sports season

2010–11 Boston Bruins
- Stanley Cup champions
- Eastern Conference champions
- Northeast Division champions
- Division: 1st Northeast
- Conference: 3rd Eastern
- 2010–11 record: 46–25–11
- Home record: 22–13–6
- Road record: 24–12–5
- Goals for: 246
- Goals against: 195

Team information
- General manager: Peter Chiarelli
- Coach: Claude Julien
- Captain: Zdeno Chara
- Alternate captains: Patrice Bergeron; Mark Recchi
- Arena: TD Garden
- Average attendance: 17,565 (100%); Total: 702,600

Team leaders
- Goals: Milan Lucic (30)
- Assists: David Krejci (49)
- Points: David Krejci (62); Milan Lucic (62)
- Penalty minutes: Shawn Thornton (122)
- Plus/minus: Zdeno Chara (+33)
- Wins: Tim Thomas (35)
- Goals against average: Tim Thomas (2.00)

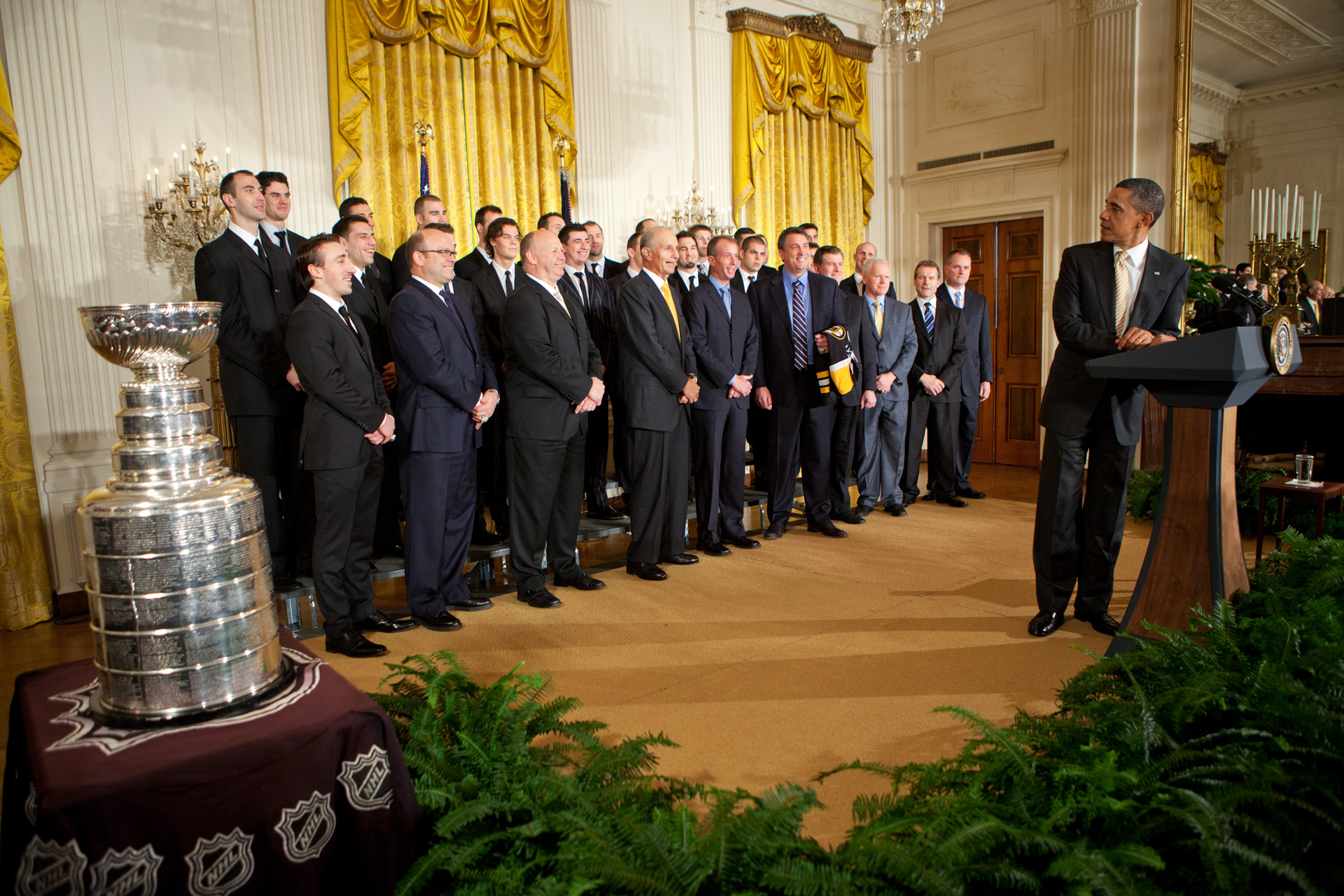
The 2011 Stanley Cup champion Bruins meet U.S. President Barack Obama.

The 2010–11 Boston Bruins season was the 87th season for the National Hockey League (NHL) franchise that was established on November 1, 1924. The Bruins were the winners of the 2011 Stanley Cup, winning their first championship in 39 years.

== Off-season ==
At the 2010 NHL entry draft in Los Angeles, California, Boston selected Tyler Seguin with their first-round pick, second overall. A week earlier, on June 16, 2010, Bruins owner Jeremy Jacobs and principal Charlie Jacobs announced that Cam Neely had been named president of the Boston Bruins. Neely, a former player and 2005 Hall of Fame inductee, became the eighth president in club history.

The Bruins sought to "tweak the composition" during the off-season, trading puck-moving defenseman Dennis Wideman to the Florida Panthers in exchange for Nathan Horton.

The Reading Royals, Boston's affiliate within the ECHL, renewed their relationship during the off-season. This marked the second year the organizations shared affiliation, with the Royals playing host to several Bruins prospects including goaltender Matt Dalton and defenseman Rob Kwiet.

== Pre-season ==
On June 21, 2010, the Bruins announced their seven-game pre-season schedule. Closing out the schedule were two exhibition matches, the first in Belfast, Northern Ireland, against the Belfast Giants Select, a unified team composed of an All-Star selection of the best EIHL players from each team. The Bruins went on to beat the Giants Select 5–1 after being held scoreless for the first period. Rookie star Tyler Seguin scored a pair of goals. The Bruins then faced off against Bili Tygri Liberec of the Czech Extraliga in their final pre-season match, with veteran Patrice Bergeron putting on a five-point display that included two breakaway goals in a 7–1 victory for the Bruins.

== Regular season ==
As part of the 2010 Compuware NHL Premiere Games, the Bruins began their season on Saturday, October 9, playing against the Phoenix Coyotes at the O2 Arena in Prague, Czech Republic. There they split their two games with the Coyotes. The Bruins spent much of the months of October, November and December playing well but slightly behind the Montreal Canadiens for first-place in the division before passing the Canadiens on December 27 with a 3–2 shootout win over the Florida Panthers. Play during this time was highlighted by excellent play for goaltender Tim Thomas, who started the season as a backup but had five shutouts by the middle of December, and by Milan Lucic's excellent offensive production, including his first natural hat-trick on November 18. In January, the Bruins continued to hold first-place in the division, aided at one point by hat-tricks from Patrice Bergeron and Zdeno Chara on January 11 and January 17, respectively. The Bruins started February with fight-filled wins against the Dallas Stars, whom they beat 6–3, and the Canadiens, against whom they picked up their first win of the season on their fourth try by a score of 8–6. The Bruins then hit a three-game losing streak, but recovered to string together a seven-game winning streak that stretched into March. The first six wins of the streak were on the road, including a 3–1 win in the Bruins' only game of the regular season against the Vancouver Canucks, which led the NHL at that time for points and would eventually win the Presidents' Trophy. After the streak, the Bruins would go on to lose six of their next seven games, including a 4–1 loss to their rivals, the Canadiens, in which team captain Zdeno Chara was nearly suspended for a hit on Max Pacioretty. They nonetheless managed five points during this time, as three of their losses came in overtime. Following this lapse, the Bruins responded with a win over the New Jersey Devils and a 7–0 win in their last game of the regular season against the Montreal Canadiens. Two games later, the Bruins clinched a playoff spot with a 2–1 win over the Philadelphia Flyers. In the next game, Tim Thomas picked up his ninth shutout of the season. Two games later, in their first game in April, the Bruins clinched the Northeast Division with a 3–2 win in their last ever game against the Atlanta Thrashers, who were set to relocate to Winnipeg for the next season.

The Bruins tied the New York Rangers for the most shutouts for, with 11.

=== Standings ===
Northeast Division
		GP	W	L	OTL	ROW	GF	GA	Pts
**1**	**y – Boston Bruins**	**82**	**46**	**25**	**11**	**44**	**246**	**195**	**103**
**2**	**Montreal Canadiens**	**82**	**44**	**30**	**8**	**41**	**216**	**209**	**96**
**3**	**Buffalo Sabres**	**82**	**43**	**29**	**10**	**38**	**245**	**229**	**96**
4	Toronto Maple Leafs	82	37	34	11	32	218	251	85
5	Ottawa Senators	82	32	40	10	30	192	250	74

Eastern Conference
R		Div	GP	W	L	OTL	ROW	GF	GA	Pts
**1**	**z – Washington Capitals**	**SE**	**82**	**48**	**23**	**11**	**43**	**224**	**197**	107
**2**	**y – Philadelphia Flyers**	**AT**	**82**	**47**	**23**	**12**	**44**	**259**	**223**	106
**3**	**y – Boston Bruins**	**NE**	**82**	**46**	**25**	**11**	**44**	**246**	**195**	103
**4**	**Pittsburgh Penguins**	**AT**	**82**	**49**	**25**	**8**	**39**	**238**	**199**	106
**5**	**Tampa Bay Lightning**	**SE**	**82**	**46**	**25**	**11**	**40**	**247**	**240**	103
**6**	**Montreal Canadiens**	**NE**	**82**	**44**	**30**	**8**	**41**	**216**	**209**	96
**7**	**Buffalo Sabres**	**NE**	**82**	**43**	**29**	**10**	**38**	**245**	**229**	96
**8**	**New York Rangers**	**AT**	**82**	**44**	**33**	**5**	**35**	**233**	**198**	93
8.5
9	Carolina Hurricanes	SE	82	40	31	11	35	236	239	91
10	Toronto Maple Leafs	NE	82	37	34	11	32	218	251	85
11	New Jersey Devils	AT	82	38	39	5	35	174	209	81
12	Atlanta Thrashers	SE	82	34	36	12	29	223	269	80
13	Ottawa Senators	NE	82	32	40	10	30	192	250	74
14	New York Islanders	AT	82	30	39	13	26	229	264	73
15	Florida Panthers	SE	82	30	40	12	26	195	229	72

bold – qualified for playoffs; y – Won division; z – Placed first in conference (and division)
AT – Atlantic Division, NE – Northeast Division, SE – Southeast Division

== Schedule and results ==
=== Pre-season ===
2010 Pre-season
#	Date	Visitor	Score	Home	OT	Decision	Record	Recap
1	September 22	Boston Bruins	4–2	Montreal Canadiens		Tuukka Rask	1–0–0
2	September 23	Boston Bruins	2–3	Florida Panthers^{1}		Nolan Schaefer	1–1–0
3	September 25	Florida Panthers	3–2	Boston Bruins	SO	Tuukka Rask	1–1–1
4	September 28	Boston Bruins	2–3	Washington Capitals		Nolan Schaefer	1–2–1
5	September 29	Washington Capitals	4–1	Boston Bruins		Tim Thomas	1–3–1
6	October 2	Boston Bruins	5–1	Belfast Giants Select^{2}		Tuukka Rask	2–3–1
7	October 5	Boston Bruins	7–1	HC Liberec		Tim Thomas	3–3–1
Match played at Blue Cross Arena in Rochester, New York.; Match played at Odyssey Arena in Belfast, Northern Ireland, home of the Belfast Giants.

=== Regular season ===
2010–11 Game Log

October: 6–2–0 (Home: 2–2–0; Road: 4–0–0)
#	Date	Visitor	Score	Home	OT	Decision	Attendance	Record	Pts	Recap
1	October 9	Phoenix Coyotes	5–2	Boston Bruins^{1}		Tuukka Rask	15,299	0–1–0	0
2	October 10	Boston Bruins	3–0	Phoenix Coyotes^{1}		Tim Thomas	12,990	1–1–0	2
3	October 16	Boston Bruins	4–1	New Jersey Devils		Tim Thomas	13,056	2–1–0	4
4	October 19	Boston Bruins	3–1	Washington Capitals		Tim Thomas	18,398	3–1–0	6
5	October 21	Washington Capitals	1–4	Boston Bruins		Tim Thomas	17,565	4–1–0	8
6	October 23	New York Rangers	3–2	Boston Bruins		Tuukka Rask	17,565	4–2–0	8
7	October 28	Toronto Maple Leafs	0–2	Boston Bruins		Tim Thomas	17,565	5–2–0	10
8	October 30	Boston Bruins	4–0	Ottawa Senators		Tim Thomas	18,959	6–2–0	12
Played at O2 Arena in Prague, Czech Republic as part of the NHL Premiere.

November: 6–6–2 (Home: 2–3–2; Road: 4–3–0)
#	Date	Visitor	Score	Home	OT	Decision	Attendance	Record	Pts	Recap
9	November 3	Boston Bruins	5–2	Buffalo Sabres		Tim Thomas	18,428	7–2–0	14
10	November 5	Boston Bruins	3–5	Washington Capitals		Tuukka Rask	18,389	7–3–0	14
11	November 6	St. Louis Blues	2–1	Boston Bruins	SO	Tuukka Rask	17,565	7–3–1	15
12	November 10	Boston Bruins	7–4	Pittsburgh Penguins		Tim Thomas	18,113	8–3–1	17
13	November 11	Montreal Canadiens	3–1	Boston Bruins		Tuukka Rask	17,565	8–4–1	17
14	November 13	Ottawa Senators	2–0	Boston Bruins		Tim Thomas	17,565	8–5–1	17
15	November 15	New Jersey Devils	0–3	Boston Bruins		Tim Thomas	17,565	9–5–1	19
16	November 17	Boston Bruins	3–2	New York Rangers		Tim Thomas	18,200	10–5–1	21
17	November 18	Florida Panthers	0–4	Boston Bruins		Tuukka Rask	17,565	11–5–1	23
18	November 20	Los Angeles Kings	4–3	Boston Bruins	SO	Tim Thomas	17,565	11–5–2	24
19	November 22	Boston Bruins	1–3	Tampa Bay Lightning		Tuukka Rask	16,241	11–6–2	24
20	November 24	Boston Bruins	3–1	Florida Panthers		Tim Thomas	16,712	12–6–2	26
21	November 26	Carolina Hurricanes	3–0	Boston Bruins		Tim Thomas	17,565	12–7–2	26
22	November 28	Boston Bruins	1–4	Atlanta Thrashers		Tuukka Rask	12,085	12–8–2	26

December: 8–3–3 (Home: 5–1–1; Road: 3–2–2)
#	Date	Visitor	Score	Home	OT	Decision	Attendance	Record	Pts	Recap
23	December 1	Boston Bruins	3–0	Philadelphia Flyers		Tim Thomas	19,684	13–8–2	28
24	December 2	Tampa Bay Lightning	1–8	Boston Bruins		Tim Thomas	17,565	14–8–2	30
25	December 4	Boston Bruins	2–3	Toronto Maple Leafs	SO	Tim Thomas	19,483	14–8–3	31
26	December 7	Buffalo Sabres	2–3	Boston Bruins	OT	Tim Thomas	17,565	15–8–3	33
27	December 9	New York Islanders	2–5	Boston Bruins		Tuukka Rask	17,565	16–8–3	35
28	December 11	Philadelphia Flyers	2–1	Boston Bruins	OT	Tim Thomas	17,565	16–8–4	36
29	December 15	Boston Bruins	2–3	Buffalo Sabres		Tuukka Rask	18,197	16–9–4	36
30	December 16	Boston Bruins	3–4	Montreal Canadiens		Tim Thomas	21,273	16–10–4	36
31	December 18	Washington Capitals	2–3	Boston Bruins		Tim Thomas	17,565	17–10–4	38
32	December 20	Anaheim Ducks	3–0	Boston Bruins		Tim Thomas	17,565	17–11–4	38
33	December 23	Atlanta Thrashers	1–4	Boston Bruins		Tim Thomas	17,565	18–11–4	40
34	December 27	Boston Bruins	3–2	Florida Panthers	SO	Tim Thomas	19,250	19–11–4	42
35	December 28	Boston Bruins	4–3	Tampa Bay Lightning		Tim Thomas	20,204	20–11–4	44
36	December 30	Boston Bruins	2–3	Atlanta Thrashers	SO	Tim Thomas	17,624	20–11–5	45

January: 8–4–2 (Home: 4–3–0; Road: 4–1–2)
#	Date	Visitor	Score	Home	OT	Decision	Attendance	Record	Pts	Recap
37	January 1	Boston Bruins	6–7	Buffalo Sabres	SO	Tim Thomas	18,690	20–11–6	46
38	January 3	Boston Bruins	2–1	Toronto Maple Leafs		Tuukka Rask	19,052	21–11–6	48
39	January 6	Minnesota Wild	3–1	Boston Bruins		Tuukka Rask	17,565	21–12–6	48
40	January 8	Boston Bruins	2–3	Montreal Canadiens	OT	Tim Thomas	21,273	21–12–7	49
41	January 10	Boston Bruins	4–2	Pittsburgh Penguins		Tuukka Rask	18,245	22–12–7	51
42	January 11	Ottawa Senators	0–6	Boston Bruins		Tim Thomas	17,565	23–12–7	53
43	January 13	Philadelphia Flyers	5–7	Boston Bruins		Tim Thomas	17,565	24–12–7	55
44	January 15	Pittsburgh Penguins	3–2	Boston Bruins		Tuukka Rask	17,565	24–13–7	55
45	January 17	Carolina Hurricanes	0–7	Boston Bruins		Tim Thomas	17,565	25–13–7	57
46	January 18	Boston Bruins	3–2	Carolina Hurricanes		Tim Thomas	17,419	26–13–7	59
47	January 20	Buffalo Sabres	4–2	Boston Bruins		Tuukka Rask	17,565	26–14–7	59
48	January 22	Boston Bruins	6–2	Colorado Avalanche		Tim Thomas	18,007	27–14–7	61
49	January 24	Boston Bruins	0–2	Los Angeles Kings		Tim Thomas	18,118	27–15–7	61
50	January 26	Florida Panthers	1–2	Boston Bruins		Tim Thomas	17,565	28–15–7	63

February: 8–4–0 (Home: 2–3–0; Road: 6–1–0)
#	Date	Visitor	Score	Home	OT	Decision	Attendance	Record	Pts	Recap
51	February 1	Boston Bruins	3–2	Carolina Hurricanes		Tim Thomas	18,126	29–15–7	65
52	February 3	Dallas Stars	3–6	Boston Bruins		Tuukka Rask	17,565	30–15–7	67
53	February 5	San Jose Sharks	2–0	Boston Bruins		Tim Thomas	17,565	30–16–7	67
54	February 9	Montreal Canadiens	6–8	Boston Bruins		Tim Thomas	17,565	31–16–7	69
55	February 11	Detroit Red Wings	6–1	Boston Bruins		Tuukka Rask	17,565	31–17–7	69
56	February 13	Boston Bruins	2–4	Detroit Red Wings		Tim Thomas	20,066	31–18–7	69
57	February 15	Toronto Maple Leafs	4–3	Boston Bruins		Tim Thomas	17,565	31–19–7	69
58	February 17	Boston Bruins	6–3	New York Islanders		Tuukka Rask	12,478	32–19–7	71
59	February 18	Boston Bruins	4–2	Ottawa Senators		Tuukka Rask	18,521	33–19–7	73
60	February 22	Boston Bruins	3–1	Calgary Flames		Tim Thomas	19,289	34–19–7	75
61	February 26	Boston Bruins	3–1	Vancouver Canucks		Tim Thomas	18,860	35–19–7	77
62	February 27	Boston Bruins	3–2	Edmonton Oilers		Tuukka Rask	16,839	36–19–7	79

March: 7–4–4 (Home: 4–1–3; Road: 2–3–1)
#	Date	Visitor	Score	Home	OT	Decision	Attendance	Record	Pts	Recap
63	March 1	Boston Bruins	1–0	Ottawa Senators		Tuukka Rask	16,826	37–19–7	81
64	March 3	Tampa Bay Lightning	1–2	Boston Bruins		Tim Thomas	17,565	38–19–7	83
65	March 5	Pittsburgh Penguins	3–2	Boston Bruins	OT	Tim Thomas	17,565	38–19–8	84
66	March 8	Boston Bruins	1–4	Montreal Canadiens		Tuukka Rask	21,273	38–20–8	84
67	March 10	Buffalo Sabres	4–3	Boston Bruins	OT	Tim Thomas	17,565	38–20–9	85
68	March 11	Boston Bruins	2–4	New York Islanders		Tim Thomas	12,119	38–21–9	85
69	March 15	Boston Bruins	3–2	Columbus Blue Jackets	SO	Tuukka Rask	12,282	39–21–9	87
70	March 17	Boston Bruins	3–4	Nashville Predators	OT	Tuukka Rask	16,839	39–21–10	88
71	March 19	Boston Bruins	2–5	Toronto Maple Leafs		Tim Thomas	19,512	39–22–10	88
72	March 22	New Jersey Devils	1–4	Boston Bruins		Tim Thomas	17,565	40–22–10	90
73	March 24	Montreal Canadiens	0–7	Boston Bruins		Tim Thomas	17,565	41–22–10	92
74	March 26	New York Rangers	1–0	Boston Bruins		Tuukka Rask	17,565	41–23–10	92
75	March 27	Boston Bruins	2–1	Philadelphia Flyers		Tim Thomas	19,927	42–23–10	94
76	March 29	Chicago Blackhawks	0–3	Boston Bruins		Tim Thomas	17,565	43–23–10	96
77	March 31	Toronto Maple Leafs	4–3	Boston Bruins	SO	Tim Thomas	17,565	43–23–11	97

April: 3–2–0 (Home: 3–0–0; Road: 0–2–0)
#	Date	Visitor	Score	Home	OT	Decision	Attendance	Record	Pts	Recap
78	April 2	Atlanta Thrashers	2–3	Boston Bruins		Tuukka Rask	17,565	44–23–11	99
79	April 4	Boston Bruins	3–5	New York Rangers		Tim Thomas	18,200	44–24–11	99
80	April 6	New York Islanders	2–3	Boston Bruins		Tim Thomas	17,565	45–24–11	101
81	April 9	Ottawa Senators	1–3	Boston Bruins		Tim Thomas	17,565	46–24–11	103
82	April 10	Boston Bruins	2–3	New Jersey Devils		Tuukka Rask	17,625	46–25–11	103

Legend: Win (2 points) Loss (0 points) Overtime/Shootout Loss (1 point)

== Playoffs ==
The Boston Bruins qualified for the Stanley Cup Playoffs for the fourth consecutive season. Their conference quarter-final matchup was against their archrival, the sixth-seeded Montreal Canadiens. The series started disastrously for the Bruins, as they dropped two games in their building. They would come back to win the next three games and, after dropping game six, would ultimately win game seven in overtime at home on a Nathan Horton goal. The next round featured a sweep of the second-seeded Philadelphia Flyers who, the previous year, had come back from down three games to none against the Bruins to win the series. This propelled them to their first conference finals since the 1992 Stanley Cup playoffs. In the conference finals, the Bruins matched up against the fifth-seeded Tampa Bay Lightning. After dropping the first game by a lopsided score, the Bruins fought back to win the next two games before dropping game four to knot the series at 2–2. The Bruins took game five to put them a win away from the conference championship. Game six was another loss for the Bruins, but game seven resulted in a 1–0 victory to send them to their first Stanley Cup Final in 21 years. In the finals, the Bruins met the Presidents' Trophy-winning Vancouver Canucks. Vancouver took the first two games at home, each by a goal, to build a 2–0 series lead. The Bruins responded with two lopsided wins at home to tie the series 2–2, but Vancouver won game five in their building to move the Bruins one game away from losing the Cup. The Bruins managed to win game six in another one sided game to tie the series and then won their third game seven of the post-season in lopsided fashion to win the Stanley Cup, their first in 39 years. After game seven, Bruins goaltender Tim Thomas was named the winner of the Conn Smythe Trophy for the post-season's most valuable player.

=== Playoff log ===
2011 Stanley Cup Playoffs

Eastern Conference Quarter-finals vs E6 Montreal Canadiens: 4–3 (Home: 2–2; Road: 2–1)
#	Date	Visitor	Score	Home	OT	Boston goals	Montreal goals	Decision	Attendance	Series	Recap
1	April 14	Montreal Canadiens	2–0	Boston Bruins			Gionta (2)	Thomas	17,565	0–1
2	April 16	Montreal Canadiens	3–1	Boston Bruins		Bergeron	Cammalleri, Darche, Weber	Thomas	17,565	0–2
3	April 18	Boston Bruins	4–2	Montreal Canadiens		Krejci, Horton, Peverley, Kelly	Kostitsyn, Plekanec	Thomas	21,273	1–2
4	April 21	Boston Bruins	5–4	Montreal Canadiens	1:59	Ryder (2), Ference, Bergeron, Kelly	Sopel, Cammalleri, Kostitsyn, Subban	Thomas	21,273	2–2
5	April 23	Montreal Canadiens	1–2	Boston Bruins	29:03	Marchand, Horton	Halpern	Thomas	17,565	3–2
6	April 26	Boston Bruins	1–2	Montreal Canadiens		Seidenberg	Cammalleri, Gionta	Thomas	21,273	3–3
7	April 27	Montreal Canadiens	3–4	Boston Bruins	5:43	Boychuk, Recchi, Kelly, Horton	Weber, Plekanec, Subban	Thomas	17,565	4–3

Eastern Conference Semi-finals vs E2 Philadelphia Flyers: 4–0 (Home: 2–0; Road: 2–0)
#	Date	Visitor	Score	Home	OT	Boston goals	Philadelphia goals	Decision	Attendance	Series	Recap
1	April 30	Boston Bruins	7–3	Philadelphia Flyers		Krejci (2), Horton, Recchi, Marchand (2), Campbell	Briere, van Riemsdyk, Richards	Thomas	19,641	1–0
2	May 2	Boston Bruins	3–2	Philadelphia Flyers	14:00	Kelly, Marchand, Krejci	van Riemsdyk (2)	Thomas	19,962	2–0
3	May 4	Philadelphia Flyers	1–5	Boston Bruins		Chara (2), Krejci, Paille, Horton	Meszaros	Thomas	17,565	3–0
4	May 6	Philadelphia Flyers	1–5	Boston Bruins		Lucic (2), Boychuk, Marchand, Paille	Versteeg	Thomas	17,565	4–0

Eastern Conference Finals vs E5 Tampa Bay Lightning: 4–3 (Home: 3–1; Road: 1–2)
#	Date	Visitor	Score	Home	OT	Boston goals	Tampa Bay goals	Decision	Attendance	Series	Recap
1	May 14	Tampa Bay Lightning	5–2	Boston Bruins		Seguin, Boychuk	Bergenheim, Clark, Purcell, Bergeron, Gagne	Thomas	17,565	0–1
2	May 17	Tampa Bay Lightning	5–6	Boston Bruins		Horton, Seguin (2), Krejci, Ryder (2)	Hall, St. Louis, Lecavalier, Stamkos, Moore	Thomas	17,565	1–1
3	May 19	Boston Bruins	2–0	Tampa Bay Lightning		Krejci, Ference		Thomas	21,027	2–1
4	May 21	Boston Bruins	3–5	Tampa Bay Lightning		Bergeron (2), Ryder	Purcell (2), Bergenheim, Gagne, St. Louis	Thomas	21,216	2–2
5	May 23	Tampa Bay Lightning	1–3	Boston Bruins		Horton, Marchand, Peverley	Gagne	Thomas	17,565	3–2
6	May 25	Boston Bruins	4–5	Tampa Bay Lightning		Lucic, Krejci (3)	Purcell (2), St. Louis (2), Stamkos	Thomas	21,426	3–3
7	May 27	Tampa Bay Lightning	0–1	Boston Bruins		Horton		Thomas	17,565	4–3

Stanley Cup Final vs W1 Vancouver Canucks: 4–3 (Home: 3–0; Road: 1–3)
#	Date	Visitor	Score	Home	OT	Boston goals	Vancouver goals	Decision	Attendance	Series	Recap
1	June 1	Boston Bruins	0–1	Vancouver Canucks			Torres	Thomas	18,860	0–1
2	June 4	Boston Bruins	2–3	Vancouver Canucks	0:11	Lucic, Recchi	Burrows (2), D. Sedin	Thomas	18,860	0–2
3	June 6	Vancouver Canucks	1–8	Boston Bruins		Ference, Recchi (2), Marchand, Krejci, Paille, Kelly, Ryder	Hansen	Thomas	17,565	1–2
4	June 8	Vancouver Canucks	0–4	Boston Bruins		Peverley (2), Ryder, Marchand		Thomas	17,565	2–2
5	June 10	Boston Bruins	0–1	Vancouver Canucks			Lapierre	Thomas	18,860	2–3
6	June 13	Vancouver Canucks	2–5	Boston Bruins		Marchand, Lucic, Ference, Ryder, Krejci	H. Sedin, Lapierre	Thomas	17,565	3–3
7	June 15	Boston Bruins	4–0	Vancouver Canucks		Bergeron (2), Marchand (2)		Thomas	18,860	4–3

- Scorer of game-winning goal in italics

== Player statistics ==
=== Skaters ===
Note: GP = Games played; G = Goals; A = Assists; Pts = Points; +/- = Plus–minus; PIM = Penalty minutes

Regular season

Player	GP	G	A	Pts	+/-	PIM
David Krejci	75	13	49	62	23	28
Milan Lucic	79	30	32	62	28	121
Patrice Bergeron	80	22	35	57	20	26
Nathan Horton	80	26	27	53	29	85
Mark Recchi	81	14	34	48	13	35
Zdeno Chara	81	14	30	44	33	88
Michael Ryder	79	18	23	41	-1	26
Brad Marchand	77	21	20	41	25	51
Dennis Seidenberg	81	7	25	32	3	41
Gregory Campbell	80	13	16	29	11	93
Blake Wheeler^{‡}	58	11	16	27	8	32
Tyler Seguin	74	11	11	22	-4	18
Shawn Thornton	79	10	10	20	8	122
Johnny Boychuk	69	3	13	16	15	45
Andrew Ference	70	3	12	15	22	60
Adam McQuaid	67	3	12	15	30	96
Daniel Paille	43	6	7	13	3	28
Marc Savard	25	2	8	10	-7	29
Steven Kampfer	38	5	5	10	9	12
Tomas Kaberle^{†}	24	1	8	9	6	2
Jordan Caron	23	3	4	7	3	6
Rich Peverley^{†}	23	4	3	7	-1	2
Chris Kelly^{†}	24	2	3	5	-1	6
Mark Stuart^{‡}	31	1	4	5	8	23
Tim Thomas^{(G)}	57	0	3	3	—	13
Matt Hunwick^{‡}	22	1	2	3	4	9
Zach Hamill	3	0	1	1	1	0
Shane Hnidy	3	0	0	0	-2	2
Jamie Arniel	1	0	0	0	-1	0
Matt Bartkowski	6	0	0	0	-1	4
Tuukka Rask^{(G)}	29	0	0	0	—	2
Team Totals	—	244	413	657	58	1115

- ^{†}Denotes player spent time with another team before joining Bruins. Stats reflect time with the Bruins only.
- ^{‡}Denotes player was traded mid-season. Stats reflect time with the Bruins only.
- (G)Denotes goaltender.
- PIM totals include bench infractions.

Playoffs

Player	GP	G	A	Pts	+/-	PIM
David Krejci	25	12	11	23	8	10
Patrice Bergeron	23	6	14	20	15	28
Brad Marchand	25	11	8	19	12	40
Michael Ryder	25	8	9	17	8	8
Nathan Horton	21	8	9	17	11	35
Mark Recchi	25	5	9	14	7	8
Chris Kelly	25	5	8	13	11	6
Rich Peverley	25	4	8	12	6	17
Milan Lucic	25	5	7	12	11	63
Tomas Kaberle	25	0	11	11	8	4
Dennis Seidenberg	25	1	10	11	12	31
Andrew Ference	25	4	6	10	10	37
Zdeno Chara	24	2	7	9	16	34
Johnny Boychuk	25	3	6	9	12	12
Tyler Seguin	13	3	4	7	5	2
Daniel Paille	25	3	3	6	2	4
Gregory Campbell	25	1	3	4	-2	4
Adam McQuaid	23	0	4	4	8	14
Shawn Thornton	18	0	1	1	-1	24
Shane Hnidy	3	0	0	0	0	7
Tim Thomas^{(G)}	25	0	0	0	—	4
Team Totals	—	81	138	219	33	396

=== Goaltenders ===
Note: GPI = Games Played In; TOI = Time on ice; GAA = Goals against average; W = Wins; L = Losses; OT = Overtime/shootout losses; SO = Shutouts; SA = Shots Against; GA = Goals against; SV% = Save percentage

Regular season

Player	GPI	TOI	GAA	W	L	OT	SO	SA	GA	SV%
Tim Thomas	57	3364	2.00	35	11	9	9	1811	112	.938
Tuukka Rask	29	1594	2.67	11	14	2	2	866	71	.918
Combined	—	4958	2.21	46	25	11	11	2677	183	.932

Playoffs

Player	GPI	MIN	GAA	W	L	SO	SA	GA	SV%
Tim Thomas	25	1542	1.98	16	9	4	849	51	.940

== Awards and records ==
=== Awards ===
Player	Award	Notes
Tim Thomas	Conn Smythe Trophy	Awarded to the player judged most valuable to his team during the Stanley Cup playoffs.
Tim Thomas	Vezina Trophy	Awarded to the goaltender who is adjudged to be the best at this position.
Zdeno Chara	Mark Messier Leadership Award	Awarded to the player who best leads by positive example.
Tim Thomas; Zdeno Chara	NHL first All-Star team NHL second All-Star team	Voted by representatives of the Professional Hockey Writers' Association.

On April 6, prior to the game against the New York Islanders, the team announced its award winners for the season.

Player	Award	Notes
Brad Marchand	NESN Seventh Player Award	Awarded to the player who exceeded the expectations of Bruins fans during the season.
Shawn Thornton	Eddie Shore Award	Awarded to the player who exhibits exceptional hustle and determination.
Tim Thomas	Elizabeth C. Dufresne Trophy	Awarded by the Boston Chapter of the PHWA, for outstanding performance during home games.
Andrew Ference	John P. Bucyk Award	Awarded to the Bruin with the greatest off-ice charitable contributions.
Tim Thomas; Patrice Bergeron; Milan Lucic	Three Star Awards	Awarded to the top performers at home over the course of the season.

Tim Thomas was named First Star of the Week on November 1, 2010 and again on January 24, 2011. He was also named Second Star of the Month for October.
Patrice Bergeron was named Second Star of the week on January 17, 2011, and First Star of the Month for January.

=== Records ===
Player	Milestone
Tim Thomas	Highest save percentage in a regular season (.938%); Most saves by a goaltender in a playoff run (798); Most saves by a goaltender in a Stanley Cup Final series (238)

=== Milestones ===
Regular Season
Player	Milestone	Reached
Milan Lucic	200th Career NHL Game	October 9, 2010
Tyler Seguin	1st Career NHL Goal	October 10, 2010
Jordan Caron	1st Career NHL Goal	October 16, 2010
Nathan Horton	300th Career NHL Point	October 16, 2010
Dennis Seidenberg	100th Career NHL Assist	October 23, 2010
Shawn Thornton	500th Career NHL PIM	October 23, 2010
Patrice Bergeron	100th Career NHL Goal	October 28, 2010
Brad Marchand	1st Career NHL Goal	November 3, 2010
Michael Ryder	300th Career NHL Point	November 3, 2010
Shawn Thornton	300th Career NHL Game	November 5, 2010
Milan Lucic	100th Career NHL Point	November 10, 2010
Mark Recchi	1,000th Career NHL PIM	November 13, 2010
Milan Lucic	1st Career NHL Natural Hat Trick	November 18, 2010
Mark Recchi	1,500th Career NHL Point	November 24, 2010
Patrice Bergeron	400th Career NHL Game	December 2, 2010
Dennis Seidenberg	400th Career NHL Game	December 7, 2010
Mark Recchi	1,600th Career NHL Game	December 15, 2010
Andrew Ference	600th Career NHL Game	December 16, 2010
Michael Ryder	500th Career NHL Game	December 16, 2010
Patrice Bergeron	300th Career NHL Point	December 23, 2010
Steven Kampfer	1st Career NHL Goal	December 28, 2010
Marc Savard	700th Career NHL Point	December 28, 2010
Daniel Paille	100th Career NHL Point	January 1, 2011
Blake Wheeler	200th Career NHL Game	January 1, 2011
Gregory Campbell	400th Career NHL Game	January 6, 2011
Patrice Bergeron	200th Career NHL Assist	January 10, 2011
Mark Recchi	200th Career NHL Power Play Goal	January 10, 2011
Marc Savard	800th Career NHL Game	January 10, 2011
Blake Wheeler	100th Career NHL Point	January 10, 2011
Patrice Bergeron	1st Career NHL Hat Trick	January 11, 2011
Gregory Campbell	100th Career NHL Point	January 15, 2011
Zdeno Chara	1st Career NHL Hat Trick	January 17, 2011
Zdeno Chara	900th Career NHL Game	February 5, 2011
Tim Thomas	300th Career NHL Game	February 5, 2011
Johnny Boychuk	100th Career NHL Game	February 9, 2011
David Krejci	200th Career NHL Point	March 3, 2011
Daniel Paille	300th Career NHL Game	March 10, 2011
Zdeno Chara	400th Career NHL Point	March 22, 2011
Tim Thomas	25th Career NHL Shutout	March 24, 2011
Nathan Horton	500th Career NHL Game	April 6, 2011
Tomas Kaberle	900th Career NHL Game	April 6, 2011

Playoffs
Player	Milestone	Reached
Gregory Campbell	1st Career NHL Playoff Game	April 14, 2011
Nathan Horton	1st Career NHL Playoff Game	April 14, 2011
Brad Marchand	1st Career NHL Playoff Game	April 14, 2011
Brad Marchand	1st Career NHL Playoff Assist; 1st Career NHL Playoff Point	April 16, 2011
Nathan Horton	1st Career NHL Playoff Goal; 1st Career NHL Playoff Point	April 18, 2011
Adam McQuaid	1st Career NHL Playoff Assist; 1st Career NHL Playoff Point	April 18, 2011
Rich Peverley	1st Career NHL Playoff Goal	April 18, 2011
Brad Marchand	1st Career NHL Playoff Goal	April 23, 2011
Gregory Campbell	1st Career NHL Playoff Goal; 1st Career NHL Playoff Point	April 30, 2011
Nathan Horton	1st Career NHL Assist	April 30, 2011
Gregory Campbell	1st Career NHL Playoff Assist	May 4, 2011
Daniel Paille	1st Career NHL Playoff Goal	May 4, 2011
Shawn Thornton	1st Career NHL Playoff Assist	May 6, 2011
Tyler Seguin	1st Career NHL Playoff Game; 1st Career NHL Playoff Goal; 1st Career NHL Playoff Assist; 1st Career NHL Playoff Point	May 14, 2011
David Krejci	1st Career NHL Playoff Hat Trick	May 25, 2011
Tomas Kaberle	100th Career NHL Playoff Game	June 10, 2011
Zdeno Chara	100th Career NHL Playoff Game	June 15, 2011

Tyler Seguin, Jordan Caron, Jamie Arniel, Steven Kampfer and Matt Bartkowski all made their NHL debuts this season.

== Transactions ==
The Bruins have been involved in the following transactions during the 2010–11 season.

=== Trades ===
June 22, 2010	To Florida Panthers Dennis Wideman; 1st-round pick in 2010; 3rd-round pick in 2011	To Boston Bruins Nathan Horton; Gregory Campbell
June 26, 2010	To Chicago Blackhawks 7th-round pick in 2011	To Boston Bruins 7th-round pick in 2010
June 26, 2010	To St. Louis Blues Vladimir Sobotka	To Boston Bruins David Warsofsky
November 29, 2010	To Colorado Avalanche Matt Hunwick	To Boston Bruins Colby Cohen
December 9, 2010	To Tampa Bay Lightning Levi Nelson	To Boston Bruins Juraj Simek
December 9, 2010	To Florida Panthers Jeff LoVecchio; Jordan Knackstedt	To Boston Bruins Sean Zimmerman; Conditional 7th-round pick in 2011 (Note: Condition not satisfied.)
December 11, 2010	To Los Angeles Kings Marco Sturm	To Boston Bruins Future considerations
February 15, 2011	To Ottawa Senators 2nd-round pick in 2011	To Boston Bruins Chris Kelly
February 18, 2011	To Atlanta Thrashers Mark Stuart; Blake Wheeler	To Boston Bruins Rich Peverley; Boris Valabik
February 18, 2011	To Toronto Maple Leafs 1st-round pick in 2011; Conditional 2nd-round pick in 2012 (Note: Condition satisfied.); Joe Colborne	To Boston Bruins Tomas Kaberle
February 27, 2011	To Anaheim Ducks Brian McGrattan; Sean Zimmerman	To Boston Bruins David Lailberte; Stefan Chaput
February 28, 2011	To Minnesota Wild Jeff Penner; Mikko Lehtonen	To Boston Bruins Anton Khudobin

=== Free agents acquired ===
Player	Former team	Contract terms
Jeremy Reich	Bridgeport Sound Tigers	1 year, $500,000
Nathan McIver	Manitoba Moose	2 years, $1.025 million
Nolan Schaefer	CSKA Moscow	1 year, $500,000
Wyatt Smith	Wilkes-Barre/Scranton Penguins	1 year, $500,000
Brian McGrattan	Calgary Flames	1 year, $515,000
Shane Hnidy	Minnesota Wild	1 year, $500,000
Kirk MacDonald	Providence Bruins	1 year, $500,000
Marc Cantin	Mississauga St. Michael's Majors	3 years, $1.85 million entry-level contract
Carter Camper	University of Miami	2 years, $1.25 million entry-level contract

=== Free agents lost ===
Player	New team	Contract terms
Dany Sabourin	Washington Capitals	1 year, $525,000
Andy Wozniewski	EV Zug	undisclosed
Mikko Lehtonen	Skelleftea AIK	1 year
Guillaume Lefebvre	Ocelari Trinec	undisclosed
Steve Begin	Nashville Predators	1 year, $550,000
Miroslav Satan	Dynamo Moscow	1 year

=== Player signings ===
Player	Contract terms
Yuri Alexandrov	2 years, $1.46 million entry-level contract
Shawn Thornton	2 years, $1.625 million
Dennis Seidenberg	4 years, $13 million
Johnny Boychuk	2 years, $3.75 million
Mark Recchi	1 year, $1.7 million
Daniel Paille	2 years, $2.15 million
Mark Stuart	1 year, $1.675 million
Andrew Bodnarchuk	1 year, $577,500
Gregory Campbell	2 years, $2.2 million
Jeff LoVecchio	1 year, $605,000
Adam McQuaid	2 years, $1.15 million
Blake Wheeler	1 year, $2.2 million
Tyler Seguin	3 years, $2.7 million entry-level contract
Patrice Bergeron	3 years, $15 million contract extension
Zdeno Chara	7 years, $45.5 million contract extension
David Warsofsky	3 years, $1.9375 million entry-level contract
Tyler Randell	3 years, $1.8 million entry-level contract
Ryan Button	3 years, $1.855 million entry-level contract

== Draft picks ==
Boston's picks at the 2010 NHL entry draft in Los Angeles, California.

Round	#	Player	Position	Nationality	College/junior/club team (league)
1	2^{a}	Tyler Seguin	Center	Canada	Plymouth Whalers (OHL)
2	32^{a}	Jared Knight	Center	United States	London Knights (OHL)
2	45	Ryan Spooner	Center	Canada	Peterborough Petes (OHL)
4	97^{b}	Craig Cunningham	Left wing	Canada	Vancouver Giants (WHL)
5	135	Justin Florek	Left wing	United States	Northern Michigan University (CCHA)
6	165	Zane Gothberg	Goaltender	United States	Thief River Falls High School (USHS-MN)
7	195	Maxim Chudinov	Defense	Russia	HC Severstal (KHL)
7	210^{c}	Zach Trotman	Defense	United States	Lake Superior State University (CCHA)

Notes on draft picks

- ^a1^a2 The Toronto Maple Leafs' first and second-round picks went to the Bruins as the result of a trade on September 18, 2009, that sent Phil Kessel to Toronto in exchange for these picks.
- ^b The Carolina Hurricanes' fourth-round pick went to the Bruins as the result of a trade on July 24, 2009, that sent Aaron Ward to Carolina for this pick and Patrick Eaves.
- ^c The Chicago Blackhawks' seventh-round pick went to the Bruins as the result of a trade on June 26, 2010, that sent Boston's seventh-round pick in 2011 to Chicago for this pick.
- The Bruins' first-round pick, 15th overall, was traded to the Florida Panthers as a result of the trade in which the Bruins acquired Nathan Horton and Gregory Campbell on June 22, 2010.
- The Bruins' third-round pick, 75th overall, was traded to the Buffalo Sabres as a result of the trade in which the Bruins acquired Daniel Paille on October 20, 2009.

== Affiliates ==
=== Providence Bruins ===
The Providence Bruins, based in Providence, Rhode Island, are the Bruins AHL affiliate.

=== Reading Royals ===
The Reading Royals, based in Reading, Pennsylvania, are the Bruins ECHL affiliate. The Royals will again look to compete in the Kelly Cup playoffs.

== See also ==
- 2010–11 NHL season
