= 2010–11 Tampa Bay Lightning season =

National Hockey League team season

2010–11 Tampa Bay Lightning
- Division: 2nd Southeast
- Conference: 5th Eastern
- 2010–11 record: 46–25–11
- Home record: 25–11–5
- Road record: 21–14–6
- Goals for: 247
- Goals against: 240

Team information
- General manager: Steve Yzerman
- Coach: Guy Boucher
- Captain: Vincent Lecavalier
- Alternate captains: Mattias Ohlund; Martin St. Louis
- Arena: St. Pete Times Forum
- Average attendance: 17,267 (87.4%)

Team leaders
- Goals: Steven Stamkos (45)
- Assists: Martin St. Louis (68)
- Points: Martin St. Louis (99)
- Penalty minutes: Steve Downie (171)
- Plus/minus: Steve Downie (+8)
- Wins: Dwayne Roloson (18)
- Goals against average: Cedrick Desjardins (1.00)

The 2010–11 Tampa Bay Lightning season was the team's 19th season in the National Hockey League (NHL). For the first time since the 2006–07 season, the Lightning qualified for the Stanley Cup playoffs.

== Pre-season ==
On May 25, 2010, the Lightning announced Hockey Hall of Fame player and former Detroit Red Wings executive Steve Yzerman as their new general manager. On June 9, 2010, Yzerman hired Guy Boucher, head coach of the American Hockey League (AHL)'s Hamilton Bulldogs, as the Lightning's new head coach.

== Regular season ==
In October, the Lightning compiled a 7–2–1 record and with 15 points, leading not only the Southeast Division, but also the entire Eastern Conference. This was the first time the Lightning had ever led the East after the first month of the season. Steven Stamkos was named one of the League's Three Stars for the month of October, with Stamkos himself coming away with the honor of First Star. Stamkos led the League with 19 points, scoring nine goals and assisting on ten, and was tied for the second-best plus-minus rating at +9.

The Lightning's record started to slide in November, as they earned only three points in their first seven games of the month. On November 11, Vincent Lecavalier suffered a fracture to his right hand. He underwent surgery on November 15 and was placed on the injured reserve list, expected to miss four-to-five weeks. He would ultimately return one month later on December 15, having missed 15 games. Despite losing their captain, the Lightning were able to win six of the month's final nine games, a stretch that included a streak of five consecutive wins. With a 14–8–3 record and 31 points, the Lightning fell to second place in the Division and fifth in the Conference.

On January 1, 2011, Nate Thompson scored just 19 seconds into the overtime period to give the Lightning a 2–1 home win over the New York Islanders. It would prove to be the fastest overtime goal scored during the 2010–11 regular season.

The Lightning scored the fewest shorthanded goals in the league with just one, and allowed the most shorthanded goals in the league with 16.

== Playoffs ==
After defeating the Pittsburgh Penguins 2–1 on March 31, the Lightning clinched a playoff spot for the first time since the 2006–07 season. They defeated the Penguins in the first round, 4–3, and swept the top-seeded Washington Capitals in the second round. However, the Lightning lost in the Conference Final to the Boston Bruins 4–3.

== Standings ==
=== Divisional standings ===
Southeast Division
		GP	W	L	OTL	ROW	GF	GA	Pts
**1**	**z-Washington Capitals**	**82**	**48**	**23**	**11**	**43**	**224**	**197**	**107**
**2**	**Tampa Bay Lightning**	**82**	**46**	**25**	**11**	**40**	**247**	**240**	**103**
3	Carolina Hurricanes	82	40	31	11	35	236	239	91
4	Atlanta Thrashers	82	34	36	12	29	223	269	80
5	Florida Panthers	82	30	40	12	26	195	229	72

=== Conference standings ===
Eastern Conference
R		Div	GP	W	L	OTL	ROW	GF	GA	Pts
**1**	**z – Washington Capitals**	**SE**	**82**	**48**	**23**	**11**	**43**	**224**	**197**	107
**2**	**y – Philadelphia Flyers**	**AT**	**82**	**47**	**23**	**12**	**44**	**259**	**223**	106
**3**	**y – Boston Bruins**	**NE**	**82**	**46**	**25**	**11**	**44**	**246**	**195**	103
**4**	**Pittsburgh Penguins**	**AT**	**82**	**49**	**25**	**8**	**39**	**238**	**199**	106
**5**	**Tampa Bay Lightning**	**SE**	**82**	**46**	**25**	**11**	**40**	**247**	**240**	103
**6**	**Montreal Canadiens**	**NE**	**82**	**44**	**30**	**8**	**41**	**216**	**209**	96
**7**	**Buffalo Sabres**	**NE**	**82**	**43**	**29**	**10**	**38**	**245**	**229**	96
**8**	**New York Rangers**	**AT**	**82**	**44**	**33**	**5**	**35**	**233**	**198**	93
8.5
9	Carolina Hurricanes	SE	82	40	31	11	35	236	239	91
10	Toronto Maple Leafs	NE	82	37	34	11	32	218	251	85
11	New Jersey Devils	AT	82	38	39	5	35	174	209	81
12	Atlanta Thrashers	SE	82	34	36	12	29	223	269	80
13	Ottawa Senators	NE	82	32	40	10	30	192	250	74
14	New York Islanders	AT	82	30	39	13	26	229	264	73
15	Florida Panthers	SE	82	30	40	12	26	195	229	72

bold – qualified for playoffs; y – Won division; z – Placed first in conference (and division)
AT – Atlantic Division, NE – Northeast Division, SE – Southeast Division

== Schedule and results ==
=== Pre-season ===
2010 Pre-season game log: 4–1–1 (Home: 1–0–0; Road: 2–1–1; Neutral: 1–0–0)
#	Date	Visitor	Score	Home	OT	Decision	Record	Recap
1	September 21	Tampa Bay Lightning	4 – 2	Dallas Stars		Ellis	1–0–0
2	September 22 (in Winnipeg, MB)	Chicago Blackhawks	2 – 4	Tampa Bay Lightning		Desjardins	2–0–0
3	September 23	Tampa Bay Lightning	2 – 5	Edmonton Oilers		Ellis	2–1–0
4	September 25	Tampa Bay Lightning	4 – 5	Calgary Flames	SO	Desjardins	2–1–1
5	October 1	Tampa Bay Lightning	2 – 1	Florida Panthers	OT	Smith	3–1–1
6	October 2	Florida Panthers	1 – 4	Tampa Bay Lightning		Smith	4–1–1

=== Regular season ===
2010–11 Game Log

October: 7–2–1 (Home: 3–1–1; Road 4–1–0) Pts. 15
#	Date	Opponent	Score	OT	Decision	Arena	Attendance	Record	Pts	Recap
1	October 9	Atlanta Thrashers	5 – 3		Smith	St. Pete Times Forum	19,791	1–0–0	2
2	October 13	@ Montreal Canadiens	4 – 3	OT	Smith	Bell Centre	21,273	2–0–0	4
3	October 14	@ Philadelphia Flyers	3 – 2		Ellis	Wachovia Center	19,592	3–0–0	6
4	October 16	@ Florida Panthers	0 – 6		Ellis	BankAtlantic Center	17,040	3–1–0	6
5	October 18	Dallas Stars	5 – 4		Smith	St. Pete Times Forum	13,277	4–1–0	8
6	October 21	New York Islanders	2 – 3	OT	Ellis	St. Pete Times Forum	13,333	4–1–1	9
7	October 22	@ Atlanta Thrashers	5 – 2		Smith	Philips Arena	9,138	5–1–1	11
8	October 24	Nashville Predators	3 – 4		Ellis	St. Pete Times Forum	14,454	5–2–1	11
9	October 27	Pittsburgh Penguins	5 – 3		Ellis	St. Pete Times Forum	17,226	6–2–1	13
10	October 30	@ Phoenix Coyotes	3 – 0		Ellis	Jobing.com Arena	8,171	7–2–1	15

November: 7–6–2 (Home: 3–1–1; Road 4–5–1) Pts. 16
#	Date	Opponent	Score	OT	Decision	Arena	Attendance	Record	Pts	Recap
11	November 3	@ Anaheim Ducks	2 – 3	OT	Ellis	Honda Center	13,304	7–2–2	16
12	November 4	@ Los Angeles Kings	0 – 1		Smith	Staples Center	18,118	7–3–2	16
13	November 6	@ San Jose Sharks	2 – 5		Ellis	HP Pavilion at San Jose	17,562	7–4–2	16
14	November 9	Toronto Maple Leafs	4 – 0		Ellis	St. Pete Times Forum	16,791	8–4–2	18
15	November 11	@ Washington Capitals	3 – 6		Ellis	Verizon Center	18,397	8–5–2	18
16	November 12	@ Pittsburgh Penguins	1 – 5		Smith	Consol Energy Center	18,275	8–6–2	18
17	November 14	Minnesota Wild	1 – 4		Ellis	St. Pete Times Forum	14,868	8–7–2	18
18	November 17	@ New York Islanders	4 – 2		Ellis	Nassau Veterans Memorial Coliseum	8,025	9–7–2	20
19	November 18	@ Philadelphia Flyers	8 – 7		Smith	Wachovia Center	19,672	10–7–2	22
20	November 20	@ Buffalo Sabres	2 – 1		Smith	HSBC Arena	17,833	11–7–2	24
21	November 22	Boston Bruins	3 – 1		Smith	St. Pete Times Forum	16,241	12–7–2	26
22	November 24	New York Rangers	5 – 3		Smith	St. Pete Times Forum	17,806	13–7–2	28
23	November 26	@ Washington Capitals	0 – 6		Smith	Verizon Center	18,398	13–8–2	28
24	November 27	Florida Panthers	3 – 4	SO	Ellis	St. Pete Times Forum	15,854	13–8–3	29
25	November 30	@ Toronto Maple Leafs	4 – 3	OT	Ellis	Air Canada Centre	19,063	14–8–3	31

December: 8–3–2 (Home: 5–1–0; Road 3–2–2) Pts. 18
#	Date	Opponent	Score	OT	Decision	Arena	Attendance	Record	Pts	Recap
26	December 2	@ Boston Bruins	1 – 8		Smith	TD Garden	17,565	14–9–3	31
27	December 4	Colorado Avalanche	7 – 5		Ellis	St. Pete Times Forum	18,212	15–9–3	33
28	December 7	@ Calgary Flames	2 – 4		Ellis	Pengrowth Saddledome	19,289	15–10–3	33
29	December 10	@ Edmonton Oilers	3 – 4	SO	Ellis	Rexall Place	16,839	15–10–4	34
30	December 11	@ Vancouver Canucks	5 – 4	OT	Ellis	Rogers Arena	18,860	16–10–4	36
31	December 15	Atlanta Thrashers	2 – 1	OT	Smith	St. Pete Times Forum	14,441	17–10–4	38
32	December 18	Buffalo Sabres	3 – 1		Smith	St. Pete Times Forum	17,141	18–10–4	40
33	December 20	Carolina Hurricanes	5 – 1		Ellis	St. Pete Times Forum	17,210	19–10–4	42
34	December 22	@ New York Islanders	1 – 2	OT	Ellis	Nassau Veterans Memorial Coliseum	7,324	19–10–5	43
35	December 23	@ New York Rangers	4 – 3	SO	Ellis	Madison Square Garden	18,200	20–10–5	45
36	December 26	@ Atlanta Thrashers	3 – 2	OT	Ellis	Philips Arena	14,610	21–10–5	47
37	December 28	Boston Bruins	3 – 4		Ellis	St. Pete Times Forum	20,204	21–11–5	47
38	December 30	Montreal Canadiens	4 – 1		Desjardins	St. Pete Times Forum	20,191	22–11–5	49

January: 9–4–0 (Home: 5–1–0; Road 4–3–0) Pts. 18
#	Date	Opponent	Score	OT	Decision	Arena	Attendance	Record	Pts	Recap
39	January 1	New York Rangers	2 – 1	OT	Desjardins	St. Pete Times Forum	18,242	23–11–5	51
40	January 4	@ Washington Capitals	1 – 0	OT	Roloson	Verizon Center	18,398	24–11–5	53
41	January 5	@ Pittsburgh Penguins	1 – 8		Roloson	Consol Energy Center	18,261	24–12–5	53
42	January 8	@ Ottawa Senators	2 – 1		Roloson	Scotiabank Place	19,698	25–12–5	55
43	January 9	@ New Jersey Devils	3 – 6		Ellis	Prudential Center	16,197	25–13–5	55
44	January 12	Washington Capitals	3 – 0		Roloson	St. Pete Times Forum	18,135	26–13–5	57
45	January 14	New Jersey Devils	2 – 5		Roloson	St. Pete Times Forum	18,736	26–14–5	57
46	January 15	@ Carolina Hurricanes	4 – 6		Roloson	RBC Center	18,680	26–15–5	57
47	January 18	Columbus Blue Jackets	3 – 2	SO	Roloson	St. Pete Times Forum	13,291	27–15–5	59
48	January 20	@ Atlanta Thrashers	3 – 2	SO	Roloson	Philips Arena	12,314	28–15–5	61
49	January 21	@ Florida Panthers	2 – 1	SO	Ellis	BankAtlantic Center	17,328	29–15–5	63
50	January 23	Atlanta Thrashers	7 – 1		Roloson	St. Pete Times Forum	13,916	30–15–5	65
51	January 25	Toronto Maple Leafs	2 – 0		Roloson	St. Pete Times Forum	14,335	31–15–5	67

February: 6–3–2 (Home: 5–3–2; Road 1–0–0) Pts. 14
#	Date	Opponent	Score	OT	Decision	Arena	Attendance	Record	Pts	Recap
52	February 1	Philadelphia Flyers	4 – 0		Roloson	St. Pete Times Forum	16,635	32–15–5	69
53	February 4	Washington Capitals	2 – 4		Roloson	St. Pete Times Forum	20,216	32–16–5	69
54	February 6	St. Louis Blues	4 – 3	OT	Ellis	St. Pete Times Forum	14,986	33–16–5	71
55	February 8	Buffalo Sabres	4 – 7		Roloson	St. Pete Times Forum	14,444	33–17–5	71
56	February 12	Carolina Hurricanes	4 – 3	OT	Roloson	St. Pete Times Forum	19,910	34–17–5	73
57	February 15	Philadelphia Flyers	3 – 4	SO	Roloson	St. Pete Times Forum	16,950	34–17–6	74
58	February 17	Detroit Red Wings	2 – 6		Roloson	St. Pete Times Forum	20,849	34–18–6	74
59	February 19	Florida Panthers	2 – 3	SO	Ellis	St. Pete Times Forum	18,710	34–18–7	75
60	February 23	Phoenix Coyotes	8 – 3		Roloson	St. Pete Times Forum	15,104	35–18–7	77
61	February 25	New Jersey Devils	2 – 1		Roloson	St. Pete Times Forum	19,563	36–18–7	79
62	February 27	@ New York Rangers	2 – 1		Roloson	Madison Square Garden	18,200	37–18–7	81

March: 5–6–4 (Home: 3–4–1; Road 2–2–3) Pts. 14
#	Date	Opponent	Score	OT	Decision	Arena	Attendance	Record	Pts	Recap
63	March 2	@ New Jersey Devils	1 – 2		Roloson	Prudential Center	12,857	37–19–7	81
64	March 3	@ Boston Bruins	1 – 2		Smith	TD Garden	17,565	37–20–7	81
65	March 5	Montreal Canadiens	2 – 4		Roloson	St. Pete Times Forum	20,274	37–21–7	81
66	March 7	Washington Capitals	1 – 2	SO	Roloson	St. Pete Times Forum	16,835	37–21–8	82
67	March 9	Chicago Blackhawks	4 – 3	SO	Roloson	St. Pete Times Forum	19,912	38–21–8	84
68	March 11	Ottawa Senators	1 – 2		Roloson	St. Pete Times Forum	18,777	38–22–8	84
69	March 12	@ Florida Panthers	3 – 4	OT	Smith	BankAtlantic Center	16,607	38–22–9	85
70	March 14	@ Toronto Maple Leafs	6 – 2		Roloson	Air Canada Centre	19,410	39–22–9	87
71	March 17	@ Montreal Canadiens	2 – 3	SO	Roloson	Bell Centre	21,273	39–22–10	88
72	March 19	@ Ottawa Senators	2 – 3	OT	Roloson	Scotiabank Place	18,813	39–22–11	89
73	March 22	New York Islanders	2 – 5		Roloson	St. Pete Times Forum	17,400	39–23–11	89
74	March 25	Carolina Hurricanes	3 – 4		Roloson	St. Pete Times Forum	16,656	39–24–11	89
75	March 26	@ Carolina Hurricanes	4 – 2		Smith	RBC Center	17,264	40–24–11	91
76	March 29	Ottawa Senators	5 – 2		Roloson	St. Pete Times Forum	16,626	41–24–11	93
77	March 31	Pittsburgh Penguins	2 – 1		Roloson	St. Pete Times Forum	20,126	42–24–11	95

April: 4–1–0 (Home: 1–0–0; Road 3–1–0) Pts. 8
#	Date	Opponent	Score	OT	Decision	Arena	Attendance	Record	Pts	Recap
78	April 2	@ Minnesota Wild	3 – 1		Roloson	Xcel Energy Center	18,591	43–24–11	97
79	April 3	@ Chicago Blackhawks	2 – 0		Smith	United Center	21,587	44–24–11	99
80	April 5	@ Buffalo Sabres	2 – 4		Roloson	HSBC Arena	18,690	44–25–11	99
81	April 8	Florida Panthers	4 – 2		Roloson	St. Pete Times Forum	20,444	45–25–11	101
82	April 9	@ Carolina Hurricanes	6 – 2		Smith	RBC Center	17,805	46–25–11	103

Schedule

Win Loss Overtime/Shootout Loss

=== Playoffs ===
2011 Stanley Cup Playoffs

Eastern Conference Quarter-finals vs. Pittsburgh Penguins (4) - Tampa Bay wins series 4–3
Game	Date	Opponent	Score	OT	Decision	Arena	Attendance	Series	Recap
1	April 13	@ Pittsburgh Penguins	0 – 3		Roloson	Consol Energy Center	18,390	0–1
2	April 15	@ Pittsburgh Penguins	5 – 1		Roloson	Consol Energy Center	18,507	1–1
3	April 18	Pittsburgh Penguins	2 – 3		Roloson	St. Pete Times Forum	20,545	1–2
4	April 20	Pittsburgh Penguins	2 – 3	3:38 2OT	Roloson	St. Pete Times Forum	20,326	1–3
5	April 23	@ Pittsburgh Penguins	8 – 2		Roloson	Consol Energy Center	18,535	2–3
6	April 25	Pittsburgh Penguins	4 – 2		Roloson	St. Pete Times Forum	20,309	3–3
7	April 27	@ Pittsburgh Penguins	1 – 0		Roloson	Consol Energy Center	18,507	4–3

Eastern Conference Semi-finals vs. Washington Capitals (1) - Tampa Bay wins series 4–0
Game	Date	Opponent	Score	OT	Decision	Arena	Attendance	Series	Recap
1	April 29	@ Washington Capitals	4 – 2		Roloson	Verizon Center	18,398	1–0
2	May 1	@ Washington Capitals	3 – 2	6:19 OT	Roloson	Verizon Center	18,398	2–0
3	May 3	Washington Capitals	4 – 3		Roloson	St. Pete Times Forum	20,613	3–0
4	May 4	Washington Capitals	5 – 3		Roloson	St. Pete Times Forum	20,835	4–0

Eastern Conference Finals vs. Boston Bruins (3) - Boston wins series 4–3
Game	Date	Opponent	Score	OT	Decision	Arena	Attendance	Series	Recap
1	May 14	@ Boston Bruins	5 – 2		Roloson	TD Garden	17,565	1–0
2	May 17	@ Boston Bruins	5 – 6		Roloson	TD Garden	17,565	1–1
3	May 19	Boston Bruins	0 – 2		Roloson	St. Pete Times Forum	21,027	1–2
4	May 21	Boston Bruins	5 – 3		Smith	St. Pete Times Forum	21,216	2–2
5	May 23	@ Boston Bruins	1 – 2		Smith	TD Garden	17,565	2–3
6	May 25	Boston Bruins	5 – 4		Roloson	St. Pete Times Forum	21,426	3–3
7	May 27	@ Boston Bruins	0 – 1		Roloson	TD Garden	17,565	3–4

Legend:
Win Loss

== Player stats ==
=== Skaters ===
Note: GP = Games played; G = Goals; A = Assists; Pts = Points; +/− = Plus/minus; PIM = Penalty minutes

Player	GP	G	A	Pts	+/−	PIM
Martin St. Louis	82	31	68	99	0	12
Steven Stamkos	82	45	46	91	3	74
Vincent Lecavalier	65	25	29	54	-5	43
Teddy Purcell	81	17	34	51	5	10
Simon Gagne	63	17	23	40	-12	20
Ryan Malone	54	14	24	38	-3	51
Dominic Moore	77	18	14	32	-12	52
Steve Downie	57	10	22	32	8	171
Brett Clark	82	9	22	31	2	14
Sean Bergenheim	80	14	15	29	0	56
Victor Hedman	79	3	23	26	3	70
Nate Thompson	79	10	15	25	-6	29
Pavel Kubina	79	4	19	23	2	62
Adam Hall	82	7	11	18	-12	32
Dana Tyrell	78	6	9	15	-5	12
Randy Jones	61	1	12	13	-4	15
Mike Lundin	69	1	11	12	-3	12
Marc-Andre Bergeron	23	2	6	8	-10	8
Mattias Ritola	31	4	4	8	-5	11
Mattias Ohlund	72	0	5	5	-7	70
Blair Jones	18	1	2	3	-2	2
Johan Harju	10	1	2	3	-2	2
Eric Brewer^{†}	22	1	1	2	5	24
Michael Vernace	10	0	1	1	-2	2
Marc-Antoine Pouliot	3	0	0	0	-2	0
Matt Smaby	32	0	0	0	2	17
Mathieu Roy	4	0	0	0	-2	2
James Wright	1	0	0	0	-2	0

Playoffs

Player	GP	G	A	Pts	+/−	PIM
Martin St. Louis	18	10	10	20	-8	4
Vincent Lecavalier	18	6	13	19	6	16
Teddy Purcell	18	6	11	17	4	2
Steve Downie	17	2	12	14	7	40
Steven Stamkos	18	6	7	13	-5	6
Simon Gagne	15	5	7	12	6	4
Dominic Moore	18	3	8	11	-3	18
Sean Bergenheim	16	9	2	11	2	8
Eric Brewer	18	1	6	7	-3	14
Ryan Malone	18	3	3	6	-3	24
Victor Hedman	18	0	6	6	0	8
Adam Hall	18	1	4	5	-2	8
Nate Thompson	18	1	3	4	3	4
Mattias Ohlund	18	1	2	3	5	8
Brett Clark	18	1	2	3	1	8
Pavel Kubina	8	2	1	3	2	10
Marc-Andre Bergeron	14	2	1	3	-2	9
Mike Lundin	18	0	2	2	4	2
Randy Jones	5	0	1	1	1	2
Mattias Ritola	1	0	0	0	0	0
Blair Jones	7	0	0	0	-1	2
Dana Tyrell	7	0	0	0	-3	2

=== Goaltenders ===
Note: GP = Games played; TOI = Time on ice (minutes); W = Wins; L = Losses; OT = Overtime losses; GA = Goals against; GAA= Goals against average; SA= Shots against; SV= Saves; Sv% = Save percentage; SO= Shutouts

Player	GP	Min	W	L	OT	GA	GAA	SA	Sv%	SO	G	A	PIM
Dwayne Roloson^{†}	34	1993	18	12	4	85	2.56	967	.912	4	0	1	6
Dan Ellis^{‡}	31	1679	13	7	6	82	2.93	741	.889	2	0	1	0
Mike Smith	22	1202	13	6	1	58	2.90	576	.899	1	0	1	2
Cedrick Desjardins	2	120	2	0	0	2	1.00	63	.968	0	0	0	0

Playoffs

Player	GP	Min	W	L	GA	GAA	SA	Sv%	SO	G	A	PIM
Dwayne Roloson	17	982	10	6	41	2.51	541	.924	1	0	0	0
Mike Smith	3	120	1	1	2	1.00	48	.958	0	0	0	0

^{†}Denotes player spent time with another team before joining Lightning. Stats reflect time with Lightning only.
^{‡}Traded mid-season
Bold/italics denotes franchise record

== Awards and records ==
=== Awards ===
Regular Season
Player	Award	Awarded
Steven Stamkos	NHL Third Star of the Week	October 25, 2010
Steven Stamkos	NHL First Star of the Month	October 2010
Steven Stamkos	NHL Second Star of the Week	January 24, 2011
Vincent Lecavalier	NHL Second Star of the Week	April 11, 2011
Martin St. Louis	Lady Byng Trophy winner	June 22, 2011

=== Milestones ===
Regular Season
Player	Milestone	Reached
Dana Tyrell	1st Career NHL Game	October 9, 2010
Dana Tyrell	1st Career NHL Goal; 1st Career NHL Point	October 27, 2010
Mattias Ritola	1st Career NHL Goal	October 30, 2010
Dana Tyrell	1st Career NHL Assist	November 9, 2010
Johan Harju	1st Career NHL Game	November 12, 2010
Martin St. Louis	700th Career NHL Point	November 17, 2010
Johan Harju	1st Career NHL Assist; 1st Career NHL Point	December 4, 2010
Victor Hedman	100th Career NHL Game	December 4, 2010
Johan Harju	1st Career NHL Goal	December 7, 2010
Martin St. Louis	800th Career NHL Game	December 7, 2010
Matt Smaby	100th Career NHL Game	December 11, 2010
Randy Jones	100th Career NHL Point	December 15, 2010
Dominic Moore	400th Career NHL Game	December 15, 2010
Steven Stamkos	100th Career NHL Goal	December 20, 2010
Randy Jones	300th Career NHL Game	December 26, 2010
Cedrick Desjardins	1st Career NHL Game; 1st Career NHL Win	December 30, 2010
Steven Stamkos	200th Career NHL Game	January 1, 2011
Dwayne Roloson	25th Career NHL Shutout	January 12, 2011
Mike Lundin	200th Career NHL Game	January 14, 2011
Steven Stamkos	200th Career NHL Point	January 14, 2011
Dwayne Roloson	200th Career NHL Win	January 18, 2011
Vincent Lecavalier	900th Career NHL Game	January 18, 2011
Marc-Andre Bergeron	400th Career NHL Game	February 6, 2011
Simon Gagne	700th Career NHL Game	February 6, 2011
Steven Stamkos	100th Career NHL Assist	February 8, 2011
Sean Bergenheim	100th Career NHL Point	February 8, 2011
Sean Bergenheim	300th Career NHL Game	February 12, 2011
Michael Vernace	1st Career NHL Assist; 1st Career NHL Point	February 15, 2011
Marc-Andre Bergeron	200th Career NHL Point	February 23, 2011
Mattias Ohlund	900th Career NHL Game	March 22, 2011
Adam Hall	500th Career NHL Game	March 25, 2011
Pavel Kubina	900th Career NHL Game	April 8, 2011

Playoffs
Player	Milestone	Reached
Sean Bergenheim	1st Career NHL Playoff Game	April 13, 2011
Victor Hedman	1st Career NHL Playoff Game	April 13, 2011
Mike Lundin	1st Career NHL Playoff Game	April 13, 2011
Teddy Purcell	1st Career NHL Playoff Game	April 13, 2011
Steven Stamkos	1st Career NHL Playoff Game	April 13, 2011
Nate Thompson	1st Career NHL Playoff Game	April 13, 2011
Dana Tyrell	1st Career NHL Playoff Game	April 13, 2011
Victor Hedman	1st Career NHL Playoff Assist; 1st Career NHL Playoff Point	April 15, 2011
Nate Thompson	1st Career NHL Playoff Goal; 1st Career NHL Playoff Point	April 15, 2011
Steven Stamkos	1st Career NHL Playoff Assist; 1st Career NHL Playoff Point	April 18, 2011
Sean Bergenheim	1st Career NHL Playoff Goal; 1st Career NHL Playoff Point	April 20, 2011
Teddy Purcell	1st Career NHL Playoff Assist; 1st Career NHL Playoff Point	April 20, 2011
Sean Bergenheim	1st Career NHL Playoff Assist	April 23, 2011
Mike Lundin	1st Career NHL Playoff Assist; 1st Career NHL Playoff Point	April 23, 2011
Steven Stamkos	1st Career NHL Playoff Goal	April 23, 2011
Nate Thompson	1st Career NHL Playoff Assist	April 23, 2011
Steve Downie	1st Career NHL Playoff Goal	April 25, 2011
Teddy Purcell	1st Career NHL Playoff Goal	April 25, 2011
Blair Jones	1st Career NHL Playoff Game	May 1, 2011
Simon Gagne	100th Career NHL Playoff Game	May 17, 2011
Mike Smith	1st Career NHL Playoff Game	May 17, 2011
Mike Smith	1st Career NHL Playoff Win	May 21, 2011

== Transactions ==
The Lightning have been involved in the following transactions during the 2010–11 season.

=== Trades ===
Date	Details
July 1, 2010	To Philadelphia Flyers Andrej Meszaros	To Tampa Bay Lightning 2nd-round pick in 2012 (Note: Pick later traded to Nashville Predators.) – Colton Sissons
July 19, 2010	To Philadelphia Flyers Matt Walker; 4th-round pick in 2011 – Marcel Noebels	To Tampa Bay Lightning Simon Gagne
August 16, 2010	To Montreal Canadiens Karri Ramo	To Tampa Bay Lightning Cedrick Desjardins
August 27, 2010	To Toronto Maple Leafs Matt Lashoff	To Tampa Bay Lightning Alex Berry; Stefano Giliati
December 9, 2010	To Boston Bruins Juraj Simek	To Tampa Bay Lightning Levi Nelson
January 1, 2011	To New York Islanders Ty Wishart	To Tampa Bay Lightning Dwayne Roloson
February 18, 2011	To St. Louis Blues Brock Beukeboom; 3rd-round pick in 2011 – Jordan Binnington	To Tampa Bay Lightning Eric Brewer
February 24, 2011	To Anaheim Ducks Dan Ellis	To Tampa Bay Lightning Curtis McElhinney

=== Free agents acquired ===
Player	Former team	Contract terms
Dan Ellis	Montreal Canadiens	2 years, $3 million
Pavel Kubina	Atlanta Thrashers	2 years, $7.7 million
Niklas Persson	Nizhnekamsk Neftekhimik	1 year, $550,000
Brett Clark	Colorado Avalanche	2 years, $3 million
Marc-Antoine Pouliot	Edmonton Oilers	1 year, $550,000
Chris Durno	Colorado Avalanche	1 year, $550,000
Mathieu Roy	Columbus Blue Jackets	1 year, $600,000
Mike Vernace	San Jose Sharks	1 year, $500,000
Dominic Moore	Montreal Canadiens	2 years, $2.2 million
Mike Angelidis	Albany River Rats	1 year, $500,000
Juraj Simek	Norfolk Admirals	1 year, $500,000
Sean Bergenheim	New York Islanders	1 year, $700,000
Randy Jones	Los Angeles Kings	1 year, $1 million
Charles Landry	Drummondville Voltigeurs	3 years, $1.625 million entry-level contract
Marc-Andre Bergeron	Montreal Canadiens	1 year, $1 million
Tyler Johnson	Spokane Chiefs	3 years, $2.27 million entry-level contract
Pat Nagle	Ferris State University	2 years, $1.125 million entry-level contract

=== Free agents lost ===
Player	New team	Contract terms
Todd Fedoruk	TBD	Contract bought out
Zenon Konopka	New York Islanders	1 year, $600,000
Ryan Craig	Pittsburgh Penguins	1 year, $500,000
Alex Tanguay	Calgary Flames	1 year, $1.7 million
Kurtis Foster	Edmonton Oilers	2 years, $3.6 million
Antero Niittymaki	San Jose Sharks	2 years, $4 million
Brandon Bochenski	Barys Astana	1 year
David Hale	Ottawa Senators	1 year, $675,000
Mark Parrish	Buffalo Sabres	1 year, $600,000

=== Claimed via waivers ===
Player	Former team	Date claimed off waivers
Mattias Ritola	Detroit Red Wings	October 5, 2010

=== Lost via waivers ===
Player	New team	Date claimed off waivers
Curtis McElhinney	Ottawa Senators	February 28, 2011

=== Player signings ===
Player	Contract terms
Mark Barberio	3 years, $1.74 million entry-level contract
Martin St. Louis	4 years, $22.5 million
Mitch Fritz	1 year, $525,000
Mike Lundin	1 year, $750,000
Teddy Purcell	1 year, $750,000
Blair Jones	1 year, $550,000
Paul Szczechura	1 year, $550,000
Nate Thompson	1 year, $625,000
Vladimir Mihalik	1 year, $600,000
Radko Gudas	3 years, $1.8 million entry-level contract
Steve Downie	2 years, $3.7 million
Alex Hutchings	3 years, $1.75 million entry-level contract
Nate Thompson	2 years, $1.7 million contract extension
Richard Panik	3 years, $2.22 million entry-level contract

== Draft picks ==
Tampa Bay will pick at the 2010 NHL entry draft in Los Angeles, California.

Round	Pick	Player	Position	Nationality	Club Team
1	6	Brett Connolly	RW	Canada	Prince George Cougars (WHL)
3	63 (from Florida via Los Angeles)	Brock Beukeboom	D	Canada	Sault Ste. Marie Greyhounds (OHL)
3	66	Radko Gudas	D	Czech Republic	Everett Silvertips (WHL)
3	72 (from Anaheim)	Adam Janosik	D	Slovakia	Gatineau Olympiques (QMJHL)
4	96	Geoffrey Schemitsch	D	Canada	Owen Sound Attack (OHL)
4	118 (from San Jose)	James Mullin	C/RW	United States	Shattuck-Saint Mary's (USHS-MN)
6	156	Brendan O'Donnell	C	Canada	Winnipeg South Blues (MJHL)
7	186	Teigan Zahn	D	Canada	Saskatoon Blades (WHL)

== See also ==
- 2010–11 NHL season

== Farm teams ==
=== Norfolk Admirals ===
The Lightnings' American Hockey League affiliate will remain to be the Norfolk Admirals in the 2010–11 season.

=== Florida Everblades ===
The Florida Everblades of the ECHL and the Lightning entered a one-year affiliation agreement for the 2010–11 season on July 29, 2010.
