= 2010–11 Florida Panthers season =

National Hockey League team season

2010–11 Florida Panthers
- Division: 5th Southeast
- Conference: 15th Eastern
- 2010–11 record: 30–40–12
- Home record: 16–17–8
- Road record: 14–23–4
- Goals for: 195
- Goals against: 229

Team information
- General manager: Dale Tallon
- Coach: Peter DeBoer
- Captain: Bryan McCabe (Oct.–Feb.); Vacant (Feb.–Apr.)
- Alternate captains: Marty Reasoner (Feb.–Apr.); Cory Stillman (Oct.–Feb.); Stephen Weiss
- Arena: BankAtlantic Center
- Average attendance: 15,618 (81.3%)

Team leaders
- Goals: David Booth (23)
- Assists: Stephen Weiss (28)
- Points: Stephen Weiss (49)
- Penalty minutes: Darcy Hordichuk (76)
- Plus/minus: Clay Wilson (+4)
- Wins: Tomas Vokoun (22)
- Goals against average: Tomas Vokoun (2.55)

The 2010–11 Florida Panthers season was the team's 17th season in the National Hockey League (NHL). The team missed the playoffs for the tenth year in a row for the first time in franchise history.

== Off-season ==
On May 18, 2010, the Panthers introduced Dale Tallon as their new executive vice-president and general manager, replacing Randy Sexton. Sexton's contract expired on June 30, 2010, and was thought to be retained in some other capacity with the club, but on July 3, 2010, Sexton was hired by the Pittsburgh Penguins to be the assistant director of amateur scouting.

On May 20, 2010, the Panthers announced that they would reduce seating capacity at the BankAtlantic Center to 17,040 by covering over 2,000 seats with tarpaulins. For select games, the team would remove the tarpaulins to increase capacity.

== Regular season ==
The Panthers finished in last place in both the Southeast Division and the Eastern Conference. On April 10, 2011, the Panthers fired head coach Peter DeBoer.

The Panthers' power play struggled during the regular season, as they finished 30th overall in power play percentage at just 13.11% (35 for 267).

== Playoffs ==
The Panthers failed to make the playoffs, for the 11th consecutive year.

== Standings ==
=== Divisional standings ===
Southeast Division
		GP	W	L	OTL	ROW	GF	GA	Pts
**1**	**z-Washington Capitals**	**82**	**48**	**23**	**11**	**43**	**224**	**197**	**107**
**2**	**Tampa Bay Lightning**	**82**	**46**	**25**	**11**	**40**	**247**	**240**	**103**
3	Carolina Hurricanes	82	40	31	11	35	236	239	91
4	Atlanta Thrashers	82	34	36	12	29	223	269	80
5	Florida Panthers	82	30	40	12	26	195	229	72

=== Conference standings ===
Eastern Conference
R		Div	GP	W	L	OTL	ROW	GF	GA	Pts
**1**	**z – Washington Capitals**	**SE**	**82**	**48**	**23**	**11**	**43**	**224**	**197**	107
**2**	**y – Philadelphia Flyers**	**AT**	**82**	**47**	**23**	**12**	**44**	**259**	**223**	106
**3**	**y – Boston Bruins**	**NE**	**82**	**46**	**25**	**11**	**44**	**246**	**195**	103
**4**	**Pittsburgh Penguins**	**AT**	**82**	**49**	**25**	**8**	**39**	**238**	**199**	106
**5**	**Tampa Bay Lightning**	**SE**	**82**	**46**	**25**	**11**	**40**	**247**	**240**	103
**6**	**Montreal Canadiens**	**NE**	**82**	**44**	**30**	**8**	**41**	**216**	**209**	96
**7**	**Buffalo Sabres**	**NE**	**82**	**43**	**29**	**10**	**38**	**245**	**229**	96
**8**	**New York Rangers**	**AT**	**82**	**44**	**33**	**5**	**35**	**233**	**198**	93
8.5
9	Carolina Hurricanes	SE	82	40	31	11	35	236	239	91
10	Toronto Maple Leafs	NE	82	37	34	11	32	218	251	85
11	New Jersey Devils	AT	82	38	39	5	35	174	209	81
12	Atlanta Thrashers	SE	82	34	36	12	29	223	269	80
13	Ottawa Senators	NE	82	32	40	10	30	192	250	74
14	New York Islanders	AT	82	30	39	13	26	229	264	73
15	Florida Panthers	SE	82	30	40	12	26	195	229	72

bold – qualified for playoffs; y – Won division; z – Placed first in conference (and division)
AT – Atlantic Division, NE – Northeast Division, SE – Southeast Division

== Schedule and results ==
Panthers '10–'11 schedule at nhl.com

=== Game log ===
2010–11 game log

October: 4–5–0 (Home: 2–1–0; Road: 2–4–0)
#	Date	Visitor	Score	Home	OT	Decision	Attendance	Record	Pts	Recap
1	October 10	Florida Panthers	2–3	Edmonton Oilers		Vokoun	16,839	0–1–0	0	Recap
2	October 11	Florida Panthers	1–2	Vancouver Canucks		Vokoun	18,860	0–2–0	0	Recap
3	October 14	Florida Panthers	3–0	Calgary Flames		Vokoun	19,289	1–2–0	2	Recap
4	October 16	Tampa Bay Lightning	0–6	Florida Panthers		Vokoun	17,040	2–2–0	4	Recap
5	October 21	Dallas Stars	4–1	Florida Panthers		Vokoun	11,580	2–3–0	4	Recap
6	October 23	New York Islanders	3–4	Florida Panthers		Vokoun	15,071	3–3–0	6	Recap
7	October 26	Florida Panthers	1–3	Toronto Maple Leafs		Clemmensen	19,239	3–4–0	6	Recap
8	October 28	Florida Panthers	3–5	Ottawa Senators		Vokoun	16,294	3–5–0	6	Recap
9	October 30	Florida Panthers	3–1	Montreal Canadiens		Vokoun	21,273	4–5–0	8	Recap

November: 6–7–0 (Home: 3–4–0; Road: 3–3–0)
#	Date	Visitor	Score	Home	OT	Decision	Attendance	Record	Pts	Recap
10	November 3	Atlanta Thrashers	4–3	Florida Panthers		Vokoun	11,212	4–6–0	8	Recap
11	November 5	Carolina Hurricanes	4–7	Florida Panthers		Clemmensen	14,761	5–6–0	10	Recap
12	November 6	Florida Panthers	2–3	Carolina Hurricanes		Clemmensen	17,704	5–7–0	10	Recap
13	November 10	Toronto Maple Leafs	1–4	Florida Panthers		Vokoun	15,243	6–7–0	12	Recap
14	November 12	Minnesota Wild	1–2	Florida Panthers		Vokoun	15,043	7–7–0	14	Recap
15	November 13	Florida Panthers	2–5	Philadelphia Flyers		Clemmensen	19,616	7–8–0	14	Recap
16	November 17	Florida Panthers	2–1	Atlanta Thrashers		Vokoun	10,168	8–8–0	16	Recap
17	November 18	Florida Panthers	0–4	Boston Bruins		Vokoun	17,565	8–9–0	16	Recap
18	November 20	Florida Panthers	4–1	New York Islanders		Vokoun	9,157	9–9–0	18	Recap
19	November 22	Pittsburgh Penguins	3–2	Florida Panthers		Vokoun	16,543	9–10–0	18	Recap
20	November 24	Boston Bruins	3–1	Florida Panthers		Vokoun	16,712	9–11–0	18	Recap
21	November 26	New York Rangers	3–0	Florida Panthers		Clemmensen	17,013	9–12–0	18	Recap
22	November 27	Florida Panthers	4–3	Tampa Bay Lightning	SO	Vokoun	15,854	10–12–0	20	Recap

December: 6–5–2 (Home: 2–1–2; Road: 4–4–0)
#	Date	Visitor	Score	Home	OT	Decision	Attendance	Record	Pts	Recap
23	December 1	Florida Panthers	3–5	Anaheim Ducks		Vokoun	12,504	10–13–0	20	Recap
24	December 2	Florida Panthers	2–3	Los Angeles Kings		Vokoun	17,720	10–14–0	20	Recap
25	December 4	Florida Panthers	2–1	Phoenix Coyotes	SO	Clemmensen	10,334	11–14–0	22	Recap
26	December 7	Colorado Avalanche	3–4	Florida Panthers	OT	Vokoun	12,721	12–14–0	24	Recap
27	December 9	Florida Panthers	3–0	Washington Capitals		Vokoun	18,398	13–14–0	26	Recap
28	December 11	Florida Panthers	0–3	Nashville Predators		Vokoun	16,128	13–15–0	26	Recap
29	December 15	Carolina Hurricanes	4–3	Florida Panthers		Vokoun	14,651	13–16–0	26	Recap
30	December 17	Buffalo Sabres	2–6	Florida Panthers		Vokoun	16,864	14–16–0	28	Recap
31	December 20	Florida Panthers	5–0	Philadelphia Flyers		Vokoun	19,864	15–16–0	30	Recap
32	December 22	Florida Panthers	2–5	Pittsburgh Penguins		Vokoun	18,238	15–17–0	30	Recap
33	December 23	Florida Panthers	4–3	Buffalo Sabres		Vokoun	18,690	16–17–0	32	Recap
34	December 27	Boston Bruins	3–2	Florida Panthers	SO	Clemmensen	19,250	16–17–1	33	Recap
35	December 31	Montreal Canadiens	3–2	Florida Panthers	OT	Vokoun	20,072	16–17–2	34	Recap

January: 6–5–3 (Home: 4–2–3; Road: 2–3–0)
#	Date	Visitor	Score	Home	OT	Decision	Attendance	Record	Pts	Recap
36	January 2	New York Rangers	0–3	Florida Panthers		Vokoun	16,752	17–17–2	36	Recap
37	January 3	Florida Panthers	4–3	Carolina Hurricanes	OT	Clemmensen	16,637	18–17–2	38	Recap
38	January 5	Atlanta Thrashers	3–2	Florida Panthers		Vokoun	12,803	18–18–2	38	Recap
39	January 7	Carolina Hurricanes	5–3	Florida Panthers		Vokoun	14,262	18–19–2	38	Recap
40	January 8	Florida Panthers	2–3	Washington Capitals		Clemmensen	18,398	18–20–2	38	Recap
41	January 11	Washington Capitals	3–4	Florida Panthers	OT	Vokoun	14,790	19–20–2	40	Recap
42	January 13	Nashville Predators	2–3	Florida Panthers		Clemmensen	12.228	20–20–2	42	Recap
43	January 15	New Jersey Devils	2–3	Florida Panthers	OT	Clemmensen	17,828	21–20–2	44	Recap
44	January 17	Atlanta Thrashers	3–2	Florida Panthers	SO	Clemmensen	11,477	21–20–3	45	Recap
45	January 19	Columbus Blue Jackets	3–2	Florida Panthers	OT	Vokoun	11,629	21–20–4	46	Recap
46	January 21	Tampa Bay Lightning	2–1	Florida Panthers	SO	Vokoun	17,328	21–20–5	47	Recap
47	January 23	Florida Panthers	2–5	New Jersey Devils		Markstrom	15,109	21–21–5	47	Recap
48	January 25	Florida Panthers	4–3	New York Rangers		Vokoun	18,200	22–21–5	49	Recap
49	January 26	Florida Panthers	1–2	Boston Bruins		Vokoun	17,565	22–22–5	49	Recap

February: 4–7–2 (Home: 1–4–1; Road: 3–3–1)
#	Date	Visitor	Score	Home	OT	Decision	Attendance	Record	Pts	Recap
50	February 1	Florida Panthers	3–4	Toronto Maple Leafs	SO	Clemmensen	19,018	22–22–6	50	Recap
51	February 2	Florida Panthers	2–3	Montreal Canadiens		Vokoun	21,273	22–23–6	50	Recap
52	February 4	Florida Panthers	4–3	New Jersey Devils	OT	Vokoun	13,557	23–23–6	52	Recap
53	February 8	St. Louis Blues	2–1	Florida Panthers		Vokoun	12,228	23–24–6	52	Recap
54	February 10	Buffalo Sabres	3–2	Florida Panthers	OT	Vokoun	14,559	23–24–7	53	Recap
55	February 13	San Jose Sharks	2–3	Florida Panthers		Vokoun	16,217	24–24–7	55	Recap
56	February 16	Philadelphia Flyers	4–2	Florida Panthers		Vokoun	17,077	24–25–7	55	Recap
57	February 18	Detroit Red Wings	4–3	Florida Panthers		Vokoun	19,947	24–26–7	55	Recap
58	February 19	Florida Panthers	3–2	Tampa Bay Lightning	SO	Clemmensen	18,710	25–26–7	57	Recap
59	February 21	Florida Panthers	1–5	New York Islanders		Vokoun	13,729	25–27–7	57	Recap
60	February 23	Florida Panthers	1–5	Ottawa Senators		Clemmensen	16,520	25–28–7	57	Recap
61	February 25	Florida Panthers	2–1	Atlanta Thrashers	SO	Vokoun	14,046	26–28–7	59	Recap
62	February 27	New Jersey Devils	2–1	Florida Panthers		Vokoun	16,592	26–29–7	59	Recap

March: 3–8–5 (Home: 3–4–2; Road: 0–4–3)
#	Date	Visitor	Score	Home	OT	Decision	Attendance	Record	Pts	Recap
63	March 1	Florida Panthers	1–2	Carolina Hurricanes		Clemmensen	16,252	26–30–7	59	Recap
64	March 3	Montreal Canadiens	4–0	Florida Panthers		Vokoun	19,722	26–31–7	59	Recap
65	March 5	Florida Panthers	3–4	Atlanta Thrashers	OT	Vokoun	15,799	26–31–8	60	Recap
66	March 6	Washington Capitals	3–2	Florida Panthers	OT	Clemmensen	15,685	26–31–9	61	Recap
67	March 8	Chicago Blackhawks	2–3	Florida Panthers		Vokoun	16,132	27–31–9	63	Recap
68	March 10	Ottawa Senators	2–1	Florida Panthers		Vokoun	12,310	27–32–9	63	Recap
69	March 12	Tampa Bay Lightning	3–4	Florida Panthers	OT	Clemmensen	16,607	28–32–9	65	Recap
70	March 15	Philadelphia Flyers	3–2	Florida Panthers		Vokoun	17,377	28–33–9	65	Recap
71	March 17	Toronto Maple Leafs	0–4	Florida Panthers		Clemmensen	16,970	29–33–9	67	Recap
72	March 19	New York Islanders	4–3	Florida Panthers	SO	Clemmensen	16,502	29–33–10	68	Recap
73	March 22	Florida Panthers	0–1	New York Rangers		Vokoun	18,200	29–34–10	68	Recap
74	March 23	Florida Panthers	0–4	Chicago Blackhawks		Vokoun	21,713	29–35–10	68	Recap
75	March 25	Florida Panthers	2–4	Buffalo Sabres		Vokoun	18,690	29–36–10	68	Recap
76	March 27	Florida Panthers	1–2	Pittsburgh Penguins	SO	Clemmensen	18,270	29–36–11	69	Recap
77	March 29	Florida Panthers	2–3	Columbus Blue Jackets	SO	Clemmensen	11,670	29–36–12	70	Recap
78	March 31	Ottawa Senators	4–1	Florida Panthers		Clemmensen	15,672	29–37–12	70	Recap

April: 1–3–0 (Home: 1–1–0; Road: 0–2–0)
#	Date	Visitor	Score	Home	OT	Decision	Attendance	Record	Pts	Recap
79	April 2	Pittsburgh Penguins	4–2	Florida Panthers		Clemmensen	18,178	29–38–12	70	Recap
80	April 6	Florida Panthers	2–5	Washington Capitals		Clemmensen	18,398	29–39–12	70	Recap
81	April 8	Florida Panthers	2–4	Tampa Bay Lightning		Clemmensen	20,444	29–40–12	70	Recap
82	April 9	Washington Capitals	0–1	Florida Panthers		Vokoun	18,371	30–40–12	72	Recap

Legend: Win (2 points) Loss (0 points) Overtime/shootout loss (1 point)

== Player statistics ==
=== Skaters ===
Note: GP = Games played; G = Goals; A = Assists; Pts = Points; +/− = Plus/minus; PIM = Penalty minutes

Regular season

Player	GP	G	A	Pts	+/−	PIM
Stephen Weiss	76	21	28	49	−9	49
Mike Santorelli	82	20	21	41	−17	20
David Booth	82	23	17	40	−31	26
Dennis Wideman^{‡}	61	9	24	33	−26	33
Marty Reasoner	82	14	18	32	2	22
Michael Frolik^{‡}	52	8	21	29	2	16
Dmitry Kulikov	72	6	20	26	−5	45
Chris Higgins^{‡}	48	11	12	23	5	10
Cory Stillman^{‡}	44	7	16	23	3	20
Bryan McCabe^{‡}	48	5	17	22	3	28
Radek Dvorak^{‡}	53	7	14	21	2	20
Jason Garrison	73	5	13	18	−2	26
Rostislav Olesz	44	6	11	17	−1	8
Evgenii Dadonov	36	8	9	17	0	14
Shawn Matthias	51	6	10	16	0	16
Steve Bernier	68	5	10	15	−14	21
Sergei Samsonov^{†}	20	3	11	14	−2	2
Mike Weaver	82	2	11	13	1	34
Keaton Ellerby	54	2	10	12	−15	22
Bryan Allen^{‡}	53	4	8	12	−5	63
Steven Reinprecht	29	4	6	10	−2	6
Michal Repik	31	2	6	8	−6	22
Niclas Bergfors^{†}	20	1	6	7	2	2
Bill Thomas	24	4	3	7	1	6
Darcy Hordichuk	64	1	4	5	−1	76
Clay Wilson	15	3	2	5	4	6
Ryan Carter^{†}	12	2	1	3	3	22
Jack Skille^{†}	13	1	1	2	−12	4
Joe Callahan	27	0	1	1	−1	12
Tim Kennedy	6	0	1	1	0	0
Scott Timmins	19	1	0	1	−8	8
Alexander Sulzer^{†}	9	0	1	1	−3	0
Patrick Rissmiller^{†}	9	0	1	1	0	0
Hugh Jessiman	2	0	0	0	−1	5
Kenndal McArdle	11	0	0	0	−3	16
Mike Duco	2	0	0	0	−1	10

=== Goaltenders ===
Note: GP = Games played; TOI = Time on ice (minutes); W = Wins; L = Losses; OT = Overtime losses; GA = Goals; GAA= Goals against average; SA= Shots against; SV= Saves; Sv% = Save percentage; SO= Shutouts

Regular season

Player	GP	TOI	W	L	OT	GA	GAA	SA	Sv%	SO	G	A	PIM
Tomas Vokoun	57	3224	22	28	5	137	2.55	1753	.922	6	0	1	2
Scott Clemmensen	31	1696	8	11	7	74	2.62	833	.911	1	0	1	2
Jacob Markstrom	1	40	0	1	0	2	3.00	14	.857	0	0	0	0

^{†}Denotes player spent time with another team before joining Panthers. Stats reflect time with Panthers only.
^{‡}Traded mid-season
Bold/italics denotes franchise record

== Awards and records ==
=== Awards ===
Regular season
Player	Award	Awarded
Tomas Vokoun	NHL First Star of the Week	October 18, 2010

=== Milestones ===
Regular season
Player	Milestone	Reached
Keaton Ellerby	1st NHL assist 1st NHL point	October 23, 2010
Michael Frolik	100th NHL point	November 20, 2010
Stephen Weiss	500th NHL game	November 24, 2010
Dennis Wideman	400th NHL game	November 27, 2010
Evgenii Dadonov	1st NHL assist 1st NHL point	December 7, 2010
Shawn Matthias	100th NHL game	December 9, 2010
Evgeny Dadonov	1st NHL goal	December 15, 2010
Stephen Weiss	300th NHL point	December 15, 2010
Tomas Vokoun	600th NHL game	December 17, 2010
Bryan McCabe	1,100th NHL game	December 22, 2010
Dmitry Kulikov	100th NHL game	December 23, 2010
Scott Clemmensen	100th NHL game	December 27, 2010
Chris Higgins	100th NHL goal	January 5, 2011
Michael Frolik	200th NHL game	January 8, 2011
Cory Stillman	700th NHL point	January 11, 2011
Stephen Weiss	200th NHL assist	January 17, 2011
Jacob Markstrom	1st NHL game	January 23, 2011
Keaton Ellerby	1st NHL goal	January 25, 2011
Scott Timmins	1st NHL game	February 1, 2011
Scott Timmins	1st NHL goal 1st NHL point	February 2, 2011
Cory Stillman	1,000th NHL game	February 16, 2011
Radek Dvorak	1,100th NHL game	February 18, 2011
Mike Weaver	400th NHL game	February 25, 2011
Bryan Allen	500th NHL game	February 27, 2011
Hugh Jessiman	1st NHL game	February 27, 2011
Mike Santorelli	100th NHL game	March 10, 2011
Jason Garrison	100th NHL game	March 12, 2011
Marty Reasoner	700th NHL game	March 27, 2011
David Booth	300th NHL game	April 2, 2011

== Transactions ==
The Panthers have been involved in the following transactions during the 2010–11 season.

=== Trades ===
Date	Details
June 22, 2010	To Boston Bruins Nathan Horton; Gregory Campbell	To Florida Panthers Dennis Wideman; 1st-round draft pick in 2010 (Note: Pick later traded to Los Angeles Kings.) – Derek Forbort; 3rd-round pick in 2011 – Kyle Rau
June 25, 2010	To Los Angeles Kings 1st-round pick (15th overall) in 2010 – Derek Forbort	To Florida Panthers 1st-round pick (19th overall) in 2010 – Nick Bjugstad; 2nd-round pick in 2010 (Note: Pick later traded to Minnesota Wild.) – Jason Zucker
June 25, 2010	To Vancouver Canucks Keith Ballard; Victor Oreskovich	To Florida Panthers Steve Bernier; Michael Grabner; 1st-round pick in 2010 – Quinton Howden
June 26, 2010	To Minnesota Wild 2nd-round pick in 2010 – Jason Zucker	To Florida Panthers 3rd-round pick in 2010 – Joe Basaraba; 4th-round pick in 2010 – Joonas Donskoi
July 22, 2010	To Chicago Blackhawks Jeff Taffe	To Florida Panthers Marty Reasoner
August 3, 2010	To St. Louis Blues Graham Mink	To Florida Panthers T. J. Fast
August 5, 2010	To Nashville Predators Conditional 5th-round pick in 2011 – Josh Shalla	To Florida Panthers Mike Santorelli
October 6, 2010	To Vancouver Canucks Andrew Peters	To Florida Panthers Darcy Hordichuk
October 7, 2010	To Vancouver Canucks Nathan Paetsch	To Florida Panthers Sean Zimmerman
December 9, 2010	To Boston Bruins Sean Zimmerman; Conditional 7th-round pick in 2011 (Note: Condition not satisfied.)	To Florida Panthers Jordan Knackstedt; Jeff LoVecchio
February 9, 2011	To Chicago Blackhawks Michael Frolik; Alexander Salak	To Florida Panthers Jack Skille; Hugh Jessiman; David Pacan
February 24, 2011	To Carolina Hurricanes Cory Stillman	To Florida Panthers Ryan Carter; 5th-round pick in 2011 (Note: Pick later traded to Atlanta Thrashers, then to San Jose Sharks.) – Sean Kuraly
February 25, 2011	To Nashville Predators Conditional 7th-round pick in 2012 (Note: Condition not satisfied.)	To Florida Panthers Alexander Sulzer
February 26, 2011	To New York Rangers Bryan McCabe	To Florida Panthers Tim Kennedy; 3rd-round pick in 2011 – Logan Shaw
February 28, 2011	To Atlanta Thrashers Radek Dvorak; 5th-round pick in 2011 (Note: Pick later traded to San Jose Sharks.) – Sean Kuraly	To Florida Panthers Niclas Bergfors; Patrick Rissmiller
February 28, 2011	To Washington Capitals Dennis Wideman	To Florida Panthers Jake Hauswirth; 3rd-round pick in 2011 – Jonathan Racine
February 28, 2011	To Carolina Hurricanes Bryan Allen	To Florida Panthers Sergei Samsonov
February 28, 2011	To Vancouver Canucks Chris Higgins	To Florida Panthers Evan Oberg; 3rd-round pick in 2013 (Note: Pick later traded back to Vancouver Canucks.) – Cole Cassels

=== Free agents acquired ===
Player	Former team	Contract terms
Eric Selleck	State University of New York at Oswego	2 years, $1.175 million entry-level contract
Chris Higgins	Calgary Flames	1 year, $1.6 million
Bill Thomas	HC Lugano	1 year, $525,000
Triston Grant	Nashville Predators	1 year, $510,000
Nathan Paetsch	Columbus Blue Jackets	1 year, $525,000
Carl Hudson	Rochester Americans	1 year, $525,000 entry-level contract
Mark Cullen	Rockford IceHogs	1 year, $600,000
Joe Callahan	San Jose Sharks	1 year, $525,000
Mike Weaver	St. Louis Blues	2 years, $1.8 million
Andrew Peters	New Jersey Devils	1 year, $500,000
Jonathan Hazen	Val-d'Or Foreurs	3 years, $2.37 million entry-level contract
Anthony Luciani	Erie Otters	3 years, $1.83 million entry-level contract

=== Free agents lost ===
Player	New team	Contract terms
Steve MacIntyre	Edmonton Oilers	1 year, $500,000
Gregory Campbell	Boston Bruins	2 years, $2.2 million
Kamil Kreps	Kärpät	1 year

=== Claimed via waivers ===
Player	Former team	Date claimed off waivers

=== Lost via waivers ===
Player	New team	Date claimed off waivers
Michael Grabner	New York Islanders	October 5, 2010

=== Player signings ===
Player	Contract terms
Adam Comrie	3 years, $2.0225 million entry-level contract
AJ Jenks	3 years, $2.0625 million entry-level contract
Colby Robak	3 years, $2.375 million entry-level contract
Scott Timmins	3 years, $1.745 million entry-level contract
Jacob Markstrom	3 years $2.625 million entry-level contract
Jason Garrison	2 years, $1.35 million
Mike Duco	1 year, $550,000
Kenndal McArdle	1 year, $803,250
Tyler Plante	1 year, $687,500
Mike Santorelli	1 year, $600,000
Quinton Howden	3 years, $2.7 million entry-level contract
Alex Petrovic	3 years, $2.475 million entry-level contract
John McFarland	3 years, $2.475 million entry-level contract
Keaton Ellerby	1 year, $787,500

== Draft picks ==
Florida's picks at the 2010 NHL entry draft in Los Angeles, California.

Round	#	Player	Position	Nationality	College/Junior/Club team (League)
1	3	Erik Gudbranson	D	Canada	Kingston Frontenacs (OHL)
1	19 (from Los Angeles)	Nick Bjugstad	C	United States	Blaine High School (USHS-MN)
1	25 (from Vancouver)	Quinton Howden	LW	Canada	Moose Jaw Warriors (WHL)
2	33	John McFarland	C	Canada	Sudbury Wolves (OHL)
2	36 (from Tampa Bay via Boston)	Alexander Petrovic	D	Canada	Red Deer Rebels (WHL)
2	50 (from Pittsburgh)	Connor Brickley	C	United States	Des Moines Buccaneers (USHL)
3	69 (from Minnesota)	Joe Basaraba	RW	Canada	Shattuck-Saint Mary's (Midget Major AAA)
4	92 (from Toronto)	Sam Brittain	G	Canada	Canmore Eagles (AJHL)
4	93	Benjamin Gallacher	D	Canada	Canmore Eagles (AJHL)
4	99 (from Minnesota)	Joonas Donskoi	RW	Finland	Kärpät (SM-liiga)
5	123	Zach Hyman	C	Canada	Hamilton Red Wings (CCHL)
6	153	Corey Durocher	C	Canada	Kingston Frontenacs (OHL)
7	183	Ronald Boyd	D	United States	Cushing Academy (USHS-MA)

== See also ==
- 2010–11 NHL season

== Farm teams ==
The Florida Panthers maintain affiliations with two minor league teams, the Rochester Americans of the American Hockey League and the Cincinnati Cyclones of the ECHL.
