= 2010–11 Atlanta Thrashers season =

National Hockey League team season

2010–11 Atlanta Thrashers
- Division: 4th Southeast
- Conference: 12th Eastern
- 2010–11 record: 34–36–12
- Home record: 17–17–7
- Road record: 17–19–5
- Goals for: 223
- Goals against: 269

Team information
- General manager: Rick Dudley
- Coach: Craig Ramsay
- Captain: Vacant (Oct.–Nov.); Andrew Ladd (Nov.–Apr.)
- Alternate captains: Nik Antropov (Oct.–Nov.); Dustin Byfuglien (Nov.–Apr.); Tobias Enstrom (Nov.–Apr.); Andrew Ladd (Oct.–Nov.); Johnny Oduya (Oct.–Nov.)
- Arena: Philips Arena
- Average attendance: 13,469 (72.6%); Total: 552,230

Team leaders
- Goals: Andrew Ladd (29)
- Assists: Tobias Enstrom (41)
- Points: Andrew Ladd (59)
- Penalty minutes: Dustin Byfuglien (93)
- Plus/minus: Bryan Little (+11)
- Wins: Ondrej Pavelec (21)
- Goals against average: Ondrej Pavelec (2.73)

The 2010–11 Atlanta Thrashers season was the 28th season of play for the National Hockey League franchise that was established on June 22, 1979, and 36th season for the organization overall. The Thrashers posted a regular season record of 34 wins, 36 losses and 12 overtime/shootout losses for 80 points, failing to qualify for the Stanley Cup playoffs for the fourth consecutive season. It was the last season for the franchise in Atlanta. It was announced on May 31, 2011, that the team was bought and would be relocated back to Winnipeg, for the 2011–12 NHL season where they returned to their original identity, the Winnipeg Jets.

== Off-season ==
During the off-season, the Thrashers announced that they would not retain John Anderson as head coach. The team also promoted Don Waddell to president and Rick Dudley to general manager. Assistant coaches Randy Cunneyworth, Todd Nelson and Steve Weeks were also not retained.

Dudley made his first trade as general manager on June 23, 2010. It was a major trade, a nine-player trade (including picks) with the Chicago Blackhawks. The Thrashers received Dustin Byfuglien, Ben Eager, Brent Sopel and Akim Aliu for Marty Reasoner, Joey Crabb, Jeremy Morin, the Devils' first-round pick (#24 overall) in 2010 and the Devils' second-round pick (#54 overall) in 2010. The Blackhawks, Stanley Cup champions, found it necessary to trade players for prospects and picks as they were in difficulty with the salary cap.

On June 24, the team named Craig Ramsay as the new head coach. Ramsay, who had been an assistant coach for the Boston Bruins for the previous three seasons, had played with Dudley with the Buffalo Sabres during his playing career. In the following weeks, the Thrashers hired an associate coach, John Torchetti, and an assistant coach, Mike Stothers. The team also hired Clint Malarchuk as the team's goaltending consultant.

== Regular season ==
=== Divisional standings ===
Southeast Division
		GP	W	L	OTL	ROW	GF	GA	Pts
**1**	**z-Washington Capitals**	**82**	**48**	**23**	**11**	**43**	**224**	**197**	**107**
**2**	**Tampa Bay Lightning**	**82**	**46**	**25**	**11**	**40**	**247**	**240**	**103**
3	Carolina Hurricanes	82	40	31	11	35	236	239	91
4	Atlanta Thrashers	82	34	36	12	29	223	269	80
5	Florida Panthers	82	30	40	12	26	195	229	72

=== Conference standings ===
Eastern Conference
R		Div	GP	W	L	OTL	ROW	GF	GA	Pts
**1**	**z – Washington Capitals**	**SE**	**82**	**48**	**23**	**11**	**43**	**224**	**197**	107
**2**	**y – Philadelphia Flyers**	**AT**	**82**	**47**	**23**	**12**	**44**	**259**	**223**	106
**3**	**y – Boston Bruins**	**NE**	**82**	**46**	**25**	**11**	**44**	**246**	**195**	103
**4**	**Pittsburgh Penguins**	**AT**	**82**	**49**	**25**	**8**	**39**	**238**	**199**	106
**5**	**Tampa Bay Lightning**	**SE**	**82**	**46**	**25**	**11**	**40**	**247**	**240**	103
**6**	**Montreal Canadiens**	**NE**	**82**	**44**	**30**	**8**	**41**	**216**	**209**	96
**7**	**Buffalo Sabres**	**NE**	**82**	**43**	**29**	**10**	**38**	**245**	**229**	96
**8**	**New York Rangers**	**AT**	**82**	**44**	**33**	**5**	**35**	**233**	**198**	93
8.5
9	Carolina Hurricanes	SE	82	40	31	11	35	236	239	91
10	Toronto Maple Leafs	NE	82	37	34	11	32	218	251	85
11	New Jersey Devils	AT	82	38	39	5	35	174	209	81
12	Atlanta Thrashers	SE	82	34	36	12	29	223	269	80
13	Ottawa Senators	NE	82	32	40	10	30	192	250	74
14	New York Islanders	AT	82	30	39	13	26	229	264	73
15	Florida Panthers	SE	82	30	40	12	26	195	229	72

bold – qualified for playoffs; y – Won division; z – Placed first in conference (and division)
AT – Atlantic Division, NE – Northeast Division, SE – Southeast Division

== Playoffs ==
The Thrashers failed to make the playoffs and have not made the playoffs since 2006–07 season.

== Schedule and results ==
=== Pre-season ===
2010 Pre-season – Record: 0–5–1 (home: 0–3–0; road: 0–2–1)

Game	Date	Opponent	Score	OT	Decision	Location	Attendance	Record
1	September 21	Columbus Blue Jackets	2–5		Pavelec	Philips Arena	5,725	0–1–0
2	September 25	Carolina Hurricanes	0–1		Mason	Philips Arena	6,701	0–2–0
3	September 27	Nashville Predators	1–2		Pavelec	Bridgestone Arena	10,411	0–3–0
4	September 29	Nashville Predators	3–4		Mason	Philips Arena	6,076	0–4–0
5	October 1	Carolina Hurricanes	1–2	OT	Pavlec	RBC Center	15,787	0–4–1
6	October 2	Columbus Blue Jackets	3–4		Mason	Nationwide Arena	11,961	0–5–1

=== Regular season ===
2010–11 Game Log: 24–19–9, 57 Points (home: 12–9–5; road: 12–10–4)
October: 5–4–2, 12 Points (home: 2–2–0; road: 3–2–2)

Game	Date	Opponent	Score	First Star	Decision	Location	Attendance	Record	Points
1	October 8	Washington Capitals	4–2	E. Kane	C. Mason	Philips Arena	15,596	1–0–0	2
2	October 9	Tampa Bay Lightning	3–5	S. Stamkos	C. Mason	St. Pete Times Forum	19,791	1–1–0	2
3	October 12	Los Angeles Kings	1–3	J. Quick	C. Mason	Staples Center	18,118	1–2–0	2
4	October 15	Anaheim Ducks	5–4^{SO}	A. Stewart	C. Mason	Honda Center	13,123	2–2–0	4
5	October 16	San Jose Sharks	4–2	C. Mason	C. Mason	HP Pavilion	17,562	3–2–0	6
6	October 20	Buffalo Sabres	1–4	T. Myers	C. Mason	Philips Arena	8,820	3–3–0	6
7	October 22	Tampa Bay Lightning	2–5	S. Stamkos	C. Mason	Philips Arena	9,138	3–4–0	6
8	October 23	Washington Capitals	3–4^{OT}	A. Semin	C. Mason	Verizon Center	18,398	3–4–1	7
9	October 27	New York Rangers	6–4	N. Bergfors	C. Mason	Madison Square Garden	17,900	4–4–1	9
10	October 29	Buffalo Sabres	4–3^{OT}	D. Byfuglien	C. Mason	Philips Arena	10,172	5–4–1	11
11	October 30	St. Louis Blues	3–4^{SO}	J. McClement	O. Pavelec	Scottrade Center	19,150	5–4–2	12

November: 8–5–1, 17 Points (home: 6–3–1; road: 2–2–0)

Game	Date	Opponent	Score	First Star	Decision	Location	Attendance	Record	Points
12	November 3	Florida Panthers	4–3	C. Mason	C. Mason	BankAtlantic Center	11,212	6–4–2	14
13	November 4	Columbus Blue Jackets	0–3	M. Garon	O. Pavelec	Philips Arena	8,461	6–5–2	14
14	November 6	Chicago Blackhawks	4–5^{SO}	J. Toews	O. Pavelec	Philips Arena	16,022	6–5–3	15
15	November 9	Ottawa Senators	2–5	J. Spezza	C. Mason	Scotiabank Place	16,583	6–6–3	15
16	November 11	Minnesota Wild	5–1	O. Pavelec	O. Pavelec	Philips Arena	10,055	7–6–3	17
17	November 13	Pittsburgh Penguins	2–4	E. Malkin	O. Pavelec	Philips Arena	16,710	7–7–3	17
18	November 14	Washington Capitals	4–6	J. Erskine	O. Pavelec	Verizon Center	18,398	7–8–3	17
19	November 17	Florida Panthers	1–2	T. Vokoun	O. Pavelec	Philips Arena	10,168	7–9–3	17
20	November 19	Washington Capitals	5–0	O. Pavelec	O. Pavelec	Philips Arena	11,115	8–9–3	19
21	November 21	New York Islanders	2–1^{OT}	D. Byfuglien	O. Pavelec	Philips Arena	10,066	9–9–3	21
22	November 24	Detroit Red Wings	5–1	B. Little	O. Pavelec	Philips Arena	15,337	10–9–3	23
23	November 26	Montreal Canadiens	3–0	O. Pavelec	O. Pavelec	Philips Arena	13,068	11–9–3	25
24	November 28	Boston Bruins	4–1	D. Byfuglien	O. Pavelec	Philips Arena	12,085	12–9–3	27
25	November 30	Colorado Avalanche	3–2^{OT}	A. Stewart	O. Pavelec	Pepsi Center	12,131	13–9–3	29

December: 7–6–3, 17 Points (home: 3–2–2; road: 4–4–1)

Game	Date	Opponent	Score	First Star	Decision	Location	Attendance	Record	Points
26	December 2	Pittsburgh Penguins	2–3	S. Crosby	O. Pavelec	Consol Energy Center	18,223	13–10–3	29
27	December 4	Washington Capitals	3–1	O. Pavelec	O. Pavelec	Verizon Center	18,398	14–10–3	31
28	December 6	Nashville Predators	3–2^{OT}	Z. Bogosian	O. Pavelec	Philips Arena	10,024	15–10–3	33
29	December 10	Colorado Avalanche	2–4	M. Duchene	O. Pavelec	Philips Arena	14,034	15–11–3	33
30	December 11	New York Islanders	5–4	J. Oduya	C. Mason	Nassau Coliseum	10,056	16–11–3	35
31	December 13	Ottawa Senators	4–3^{OT}	B. Little	O. Pavelec	Scotiabank Place	18,184	17–11–3	37
32	December 15	Tampa Bay Lightning	1–2^{SO}	S. Bergenheim	O. Pavelec	St. Pete Times Forum	14,441	17–11–4	38
33	December 16	Carolina Hurricanes	2–3^{SO}	S. Samsonov	C. Mason	Philips Arena	11,043	17–11–5	39
34	December 18	New Jersey Devils	7–1	E. Boulton	O. Pavelec	Philips Arena	17,024	18–11–5	41
35	December 20	Toronto Maple Leafs	6–3	T. Enstrom	O. Pavelec	Air Canada Centre	19,301	19–11–5	43
36	December 21	St. Louis Blues	2–4	A. Steen	C. Mason	Philips Arena	14,662	19–12–5	43
37	December 23	Boston Bruins	1–4	S. Thornton	O. Pavelec	TD Garden	17,565	19–13–5	43
38	December 26	Tampa Bay Lightning	2–3^{OT}	V. Lecavalier	O. Pavelec	Philips Arena	14,610	19–13–6	44
39	December 28	Pittsburgh Penguins	3–6	S. Crosby	O. Pavelec	Consol Energy Center	18,322	19–14–6	44
40	December 30	Boston Bruins	3–2^{SO}	T. Enstrom	O. Pavelec	Philips Arena	17,624	20–14–6	46
41	December 31	New Jersey Devils	1–3	J. Hedberg	C. Mason	Prudential Center	13,492	20–15–6	46

January: 4–4–3, 11 Points (home: 1–2–2; road: 3–1–1)

Game	Date	Opponent	Score	First Star	Decision	Location	Attendance	Record	Points
42	January 2	Montreal Canadiens	4–3^{OT}	D. Byfuglien	O. Pavelec	Bell Centre	21,273	21–15–6	48
43	January 5	Florida Panthers	3–2	R. Peverley	O. Pavelec	BankAtlantic Center	12,803	22–15–6	50
44	January 7	Toronto Maple Leafs	3–9	M. Grabovski	O. Pavelec	Philips Arena	14,592	22–16–6	50
45	January 9	Carolina Hurricanes	3–4^{OT}	T. Ruutu	O. Pavelec	RBC Center	17,907	22–16–7	51
46	January 14	Philadelphia Flyers	2–5	D. Briere	O. Pavelec	Philips Arena	15,081	22–17–7	51
47	January 15	Dallas Stars	1–6	T. Daley	O. Pavelec	American Airlines Center	17,702	22–18–7	51
48	January 17	Florida Panthers	3–2^{SO}	A. Burmistrov	O. Pavelec	BankAtlantic Center	11,477	23–18–7	53
49	January 20	Tampa Bay Lightning	2–3^{SO}	S. Stamkos	O. Pavelec	Philips Arena	12,314	23–18–8	54
50	January 22	New York Rangers	2–3^{SO}	M. Zuccarello	O. Pavelec	Philips Arena	17,061	23–18–9	55
51	January 23	Tampa Bay Lightning	1–7	S. Gagne	O. Pavelec	St. Pete Times Forum	13,916	23–19–9	55
52	January 26	Washington Capitals	1–0	O. Pavelec	O. Pavelec	Philips Arena	14,513	24–19–9	57

February: 2–7–2, 6 points (home: 2–3–1; road: 0–4–1)

Game	Date	Opponent	Score	First Star	Decision	Location	Attendance	Record	Points
53	February 1	New York Islanders	1–4	K. Okposo	O. Pavelec	Philips Arena	11,176	24–20–9	57
54	February 3	Calgary Flames	2–4	M. Giordano	O. Pavelec	Philips Arena	12,984	24–21–9	57
55	February 5	Carolina Hurricanes	3–4^{OT}	E. Cole	O. Pavelec	RBC Center	16,874	24–21–10	58
56	February 7	Toronto Maple Leafs	4–5	T. Kaberle	O. Pavelec	Air Canada Centre	19,104	24–22–10	58
57	February 11	New York Rangers	3–2	E. Kane	O. Pavelec	Philips Arena	15,093	25–22–10	60
58	February 13	Carolina Hurricanes	2–3	E. Cole	O. Pavelec	Philips Arena	13,032	25–23–10	60
59	February 17	Phoenix Coyotes	3–4	L. Korpikoski	O. Pavelec	Jobing.com Arena	10,576	25–24–10	60
60	February 19	Edmonton Oilers	3–5	T. Hall	C. Mason	Rexall Place	16,839	25–25–10	60
61	February 23	Buffalo Sabres	1–4	T. Myers	O. Pavelec	HSBC Arena	18,690	25–26–10	60
62	February 25	Florida Panthers	1–2^{SO}	S. Bernier	C. Mason	Philips Arena	14,046	25–26–11	61
63	February 27	Toronto Maple Leafs	3–2^{OT}	R. Hainsey	C. Mason	Philips Arena	13,147	26–26–11	63

March: 7–6–1, 15 Points (home: 3–3–1; road: 4–3–0)

Game	Date	Opponent	Score	First Star	Decision	Location	Attendance	Record	Points
64	March 1	Montreal Canadiens	1–3	C. Price	C. Mason	Philips Arena	11,156	26–27–11	63
65	March 3	Ottawa Senators	1–3	B. Bulter	C. Mason	Philips Arena	10,461	26–28–11	63
66	March 5	Florida Panthers	4–3^{OT}	A. Ladd	C. Mason	Philips Arena	15,799	27–28–11	65
67	March 9	Carolina Hurricanes	3–2^{OT}	O. Pavelec	O. Pavelec	RBC Center	16,126	28–28–11	67
68	March 11	New Jersey Devils	2–3^{OT}	T. Zajac	O. Pavelec	Philips Arena	16,073	28–28–12	68
69	March 12	Philadelphia Flyers	5–4^{OT}	V. Leino	C. Mason	Wells Fargo Center	19,892	29–28–12	70
70	March 15	New Jersey Devils	2–4	J. Josefson	O. Pavelec	Prudential Center	16,188	29–29–12	70
71	March 17	Philadelphia Flyers	4–3^{SO}	R. Hainsey	O. Pavelec	Philips Arena	16,502	30–29–12	72
72	March 19	Buffalo Sabres	2–8	M. Mancari	O. Pavelec	HSBC Arena	18,690	30–30–12	72
73	March 24	New York Islanders	2–1	B. Wheeler	C. Mason	Nassau Coliseum	11,874	31–30–12	74
74	March 25	Vancouver Canucks	1–3	R. Luongo	C. Mason	Philips Arena	16,237	31–31–12	74
75	March 27	Ottawa Senators	5–4^{SO}	B. Maxwell	C. Mason	Philips Arena	16,392	32–31–12	76
76	March 29	Montreal Canadiens	1–3	C. Price	O. Pavelec	Bell Centre	21,273	32–32–12	76
77	March 31	Philadelphia Flyers	1–0	C. Mason	C. Mason	Wells Fargo Center	19,879	33–32–12	78

April: 1–4–0, 2 Points (home: 0–2–0; road: 1–2–0)

Game	Date	Opponent	Score	First Star	Decision	Location	Attendance	Record	Points
78	April 2	Boston Bruins	2–3	M. Ryder	O. Pavelec	TD Garden	17,565	33–33–12	78
79	April 5	Nashville Predators	3–6	J. Tootoo	C. Mason	Bridgestone Arena	16,756	33–34–12	78
80	April 7	New York Rangers	3–0	O. Pavelec	O. Pavelec	Madison Square Garden	18,200	34–34–12	80
81	April 8	Carolina Hurricanes	1–6	J. Skinner	O. Pavelec	Philips Arena	14,652	34–35–12	80
82	April 10	Pittsburgh Penguins	2–5	B. Lovejoy	C. Mason	Philips Arena	16,085	34–36–12	80

2010–11 Schedule

Win (2 Points) Loss (0 Points) Overtime/Shootout Loss (1 Point)

== Player statistics ==
=== Skaters ===
Note: Pos = Position; GP = Games played; G = Goals; A = Assists; Pts = Points; PIM = Penalty minutes; +/- = Plus/minus; PPG = Power-play goals; SHG = Short-handed goals; GWG = Game-winning goals

Regular season

Player	GP	G	A	Pts	+/−	PIM
Andrew Ladd	81	29	30	59	−10	39
Dustin Byfuglien	81	20	33	53	−2	93
Tobias Enstrom	72	10	41	51	−10	54
Bryan Little	76	18	30	48	11	33
Evander Kane	73	19	24	43	−12	68
Nik Antropov	76	16	25	41	−17	42
Anthony Stewart	80	14	25	39	−10	55
Rich Peverley^{‡}	59	14	20	34	−16	35
Niclas Bergfors^{‡}	52	11	18	29	−11	6
Alexander Burmistrov	74	6	14	20	−12	27
Ron Hainsey	82	3	16	19	3	24
Chris Thorburn	82	9	10	19	−4	77
Johnny Oduya	82	2	15	17	−15	22
Zach Bogosian	71	5	12	17	−27	29
Blake Wheeler^{†}	23	7	10	17	2	14
Jim Slater	36	5	7	12	4	19
Eric Boulton	69	6	4	10	1	87
Fredrik Modin^{‡}	36	7	3	10	−11	12
Ben Eager^{‡}	34	3	7	10	4	77
Tim Stapleton	45	5	2	7	−10	12
Brent Sopel^{‡}	59	2	5	7	7	16
Rob Schremp^{†}	18	3	1	4	−1	4
Freddy Meyer	15	1	1	2	−7	8
Ben Maxwell	12	1	1	2	−7	9
Patrice Cormier	21	1	1	2	−5	4
Andrei Zubarev	4	0	1	1	−4	4
Radek Dvorak^{†}	13	0	1	1	0	4
Mark Stuart^{†}	23	1	0	1	−8	24
Nigel Dawes^{‡}	9	0	1	1	−6	0
Noah Welch	2	0	0	0	−1	0
Arturs Kulda	2	0	0	0	−2	2
Paul Postma	1	0	0	0	0	0
Spencer Machacek	10	0	0	0	−2	0
Carl Klingberg	1	0	0	0	0	0
Patrick Rissmiller^{‡}	1	0	0	0	−1	0

=== Goaltenders ===
Note: GP = Games played; Min = Minutes played; W = Wins; L = Losses; OT = Overtime losses; GA = Goals against; GAA= Goals against average; SA= Shots against; SV= Saves; Sv% = Save percentage; SO= Shutouts

Regular season

Player	GP	Min	W	L	OT	GA	GAA	SA	Sv%	SHO	G	A	PIM
Ondrej Pavelec	58	3225	21	23	9	147	2.73	1705	.914%	4	0	0	4
Chris Mason	33	1682	13	13	3	95	3.39	882	.892%	0	0	0	4
Peter Mannino	2	73	0	0	0	5	4.11	36	.861%	0	0	0	0

^{†}Denotes player spent time with another team before joining Thrashers. Stats reflect time with the Thrashers only.
^{‡}Traded mid-season
underline/italics denotes franchise record

== Awards and records ==
=== Records ===
Player	Record (Amount)	Achieved
Tobias Enstrom	Most consecutive games played in franchise history (253)	October 22, 2010
Ondrej Pavelec	Most consecutive victories in franchise history (6)	November 30, 2010
Dustin Byfuglien	Most goals in a single season by a defenseman in franchise history (11)	December 13, 2010

=== Milestones ===
Regular Season
Player	Milestone	Reached
Alexander Burmistrov	1st Career NHL Game	October 8, 2010
Nigel Dawes	200th Career NHL Game	October 8, 2010
Anthony Stewart	1st Career NHL Hat Trick	October 15, 2010
Rich Peverley	200th Career NHL Game	October 20, 2010
Alexander Burmistrov	1st Career NHL Assist; 1st Career NHL Point	October 27, 2010
Alexander Burmistrov	1st Career NHL Goal	October 29, 2010
Brent Sopel	600th Career NHL Game	November 3, 2010
Niclas Bergfors	100th Career NHL Game	November 4, 2010
Andrew Ladd	100th Career NHL Assist	November 21, 2010
Eric Boulton	500th Career NHL Game	December 2, 2010
Chris Thorburn	300th Career NHL Game	December 6, 2010
Eric Boulton	1st Career NHL Hat Trick	December 18, 2010
Evander Kane	100th Career NHL Game	December 21, 2010
Patrice Cormier	1st Career NHL Game	December 28, 2010
Jim Slater	100th Career NHL Point	December 28, 2010
Dustin Byfuglien	300th Career NHL Game	December 30, 2010
Patrice Cormier	1st Career NHL Assist; 1st Career NHL Point	January 2, 2011
Patrice Cormier	1st Career NHL Goal	January 7, 2011
Tim Stapleton	1st Career NHL Assist	January 22, 2011
Ondrej Pavelec	100th Career NHL Game	February 1, 2011
Tobias Enstrom	300th Career NHL Game	February 19, 2011
Nik Antropov	400th Career NHL Point	February 23, 2011
Paul Postma	1st Career NHL Game	March 9, 2011
Rob Schremp	100th Career NHL Game	March 9, 2011
Andrew Ladd	200th Career NHL Point	March 11, 2011
Ben Maxwell	1st Career NHL Goal; 1st Career NHL Assist; 1st Career NHL Point	March 27, 2011
Mark Stuart	300th Career NHL Game	March 29, 2011
Andrei Zubarev	1st Career NHL Game	April 5, 2011
Andrew Ladd	400th Career NHL Game	April 7, 2011
Andrei Zubarev	1st Career NHL Assist; 1st Career NHL Point	April 7, 2011
Carl Klingberg	1st Career NHL Game	April 10, 2011

=== Awards ===
Regular Season
Player	Award	Awarded
Ondrej Pavelec	NHL First Star of the Week	November 29, 2010
Dustin Byfuglien	NHL Second Star of the Week	November 29, 2010
Dustin Byfuglien	NHL Third Star of the Month (November)	December 1, 2010

== Transactions ==
The Thrashers have been involved in the following transactions during the 2010–11 season.

=== Trades ===
Date	Details
June 24, 2010	To Chicago Blackhawks Marty Reasoner; Joey Crabb; Jeremy Morin; 1st-round pick in 2010 – Kevin Hayes; 2nd-round pick in 2010 – Justin Holl	To Atlanta Thrashers Dustin Byfuglien; Ben Eager; Brent Sopel; Akim Aliu
June 26, 2010	To New York Islanders 5th-round pick in 2011 – Brenden Kichton	To Atlanta Thrashers 6th-round pick in 2010 – Kendall McFaull; 6th-round pick in 2010 – Tanner Lane
June 26, 2010	To Los Angeles Kings 6th-round pick (158th overall) in 2010 – Maxim Kitsyn	To Atlanta Thrashers 6th-round pick (169th overall) in 2010 – Sebastian Owuya; 7th-round pick in 2010 – Peter Stoykewych
July 1, 2010	To Chicago Blackhawks Ivan Vishnevskiy; 2nd-round pick in 2011 – Adam Clendening	To Atlanta Thrashers Andrew Ladd
August 2, 2010	To New York Rangers Todd White	To Atlanta Thrashers Donald Brashear; Patrick Rissmiller
September 1, 2010	To Nashville Predators Grant Lewis	To Atlanta Thrashers Ian McKenzie
January 18, 2011	To San Jose Sharks Ben Eager	To Atlanta Thrashers 5th-round pick in 2011 – Austen Brassard
February 18, 2011	To Boston Bruins Rich Peverley; Boris Valabik	To Atlanta Thrashers Mark Stuart; Blake Wheeler
February 24, 2011	To Montreal Canadiens Nigel Dawes; Brent Sopel	To Atlanta Thrashers Ben Maxwell; 4th-round pick in 2011 – Oliver Archambault
February 28, 2011	To Florida Panthers Niclas Bergfors; Patrick Rissmiller	To Atlanta Thrashers Radek Dvorak; 5th-round pick in 2011 (Note: Pick later traded to San Jose Sharks.) – Sean Kuraly
February 28, 2011	To Montreal Canadiens Drew MacIntyre	To Atlanta Thrashers Brett Festerling
February 28, 2011	To Calgary Flames Fredrik Modin	To Atlanta Thrashers 7th-round pick in 2011 (Note: Pick later traded to San Jose Sharks.) – Colin Blackwell

=== Free agents acquired ===
Player	Former team	Contract terms
Fredrik Pettersson	Frölunda HC	2 years, $1.23 million entry-level contract
Chris Mason	St. Louis Blues	2 years, $3.7 million
Mike Siklenka	Red Bull Salzburg	1 year, $500,000
Jared Ross	Philadelphia Flyers	1 year, $500,000
Jaime Sifers	Minnesota Wild	1 year, $525,000
Freddy Meyer	New York Islanders	1 year, $600,000
Fredrik Modin	Los Angeles Kings	1 year, $800,000
Nigel Dawes	Calgary Flames	1 year, $600,000
Tim Stapleton	San Antonio Rampage	2 years, $1.05 million

=== Free agents lost ===
Player	New team	Contract terms
Colby Armstrong	Toronto Maple Leafs	3 years, $9 million
Johan Hedberg	New Jersey Devils	1 year, $1.5 million
Pavel Kubina	Tampa Bay Lightning	2 years, $7.7 million
Maxim Afinogenov	SKA Saint Petersburg	5 years
Clarke MacArthur	Toronto Maple Leafs	1 year, $1.1 million

=== Claimed via waivers ===
Player	Former team	Date claimed off waivers
Rob Schremp	New York Islanders	February 28, 2011

=== Lost via waivers ===
Player	New team	Date claimed off waivers

=== Lost via retirement ===
Player
Chris Chelios

=== Player signings ===
Player	Contract terms
Eddie Pasquale	3 years, $1.8375 million entry-level contract
Chris Carrozzi	3 years, $1.86 million entry-level contract
Carl Klingberg	3 years, $2.37 million entry-level contract
Danick Paquette	3 years, $1.875 million entry-level contract
Jeremy Morin	3 years, $2.295 million entry-level contract
Eric O'Dell	3 years, $1.825 million entry-level contract
Jim Slater	2 years, $2 million
Noah Welch	1 year, $525,000
Eric Boulton	1 year, $650,000
Ondrej Pavelec	2 years, $2.3 million
Ben Eager	1 year, $965,000
Andrew Ladd	1 year, $2.35 million
Peter Mannino	2 years, $1.05 million
Bryan Little	3 years, $7.15 million
Andrei Zubarev	2 years, $1.375 million entry-level contract
Niclas Bergfors	1 year, $900,000
Alexander Burmistrov	3 years, $2.430 million entry-level contract
Dustin Byfuglien	5 years, $26 million contract extension
Chris Thorburn	3 years, $2.6 million contract extension
Mark Stuart	3 years, $5.1 million contract extension
Ben Chiarot	3 years, $1.855 million entry-level contract
Zach Redmond	2 years, $1.375 million entry-level contract

== Draft picks ==
Atlanta's picks at the 2010 NHL entry draft in Los Angeles.

Round	Overall	Player	Position	Nationality	College/Junior/Club team (League)
1	8	Alexander Burmistrov	C	Russia	Barrie Colts (OHL)
3	87 (from Montreal)	Julian Melchiori	D	Canada	Newmarket Hurricanes (CCHL)
4	101 (from Dallas)	Ivan Telegin	LW	Russia	Saginaw Spirit (OHL)
5	128	Fredrik Pettersson-Wentzel	G	Sweden	Almtuna IS (Sweden-2)
5	150 (from Chicago)	Yasin Cisse	RW	Canada	Des Moines Buccaneers (USHL)
6	155 (from NY Islanders)	Kendall McFaull	D	Canada	Moose Jaw Warriors (WHL)
6	160 (from NY Islanders via NY Rangers)	Tanner Lane	C	United States	Detroit Lakes High School (USHS-MN)
6	169 (from Los Angeles)	Sebastian Owuya	D	Sweden	Timrå IK Jr. (Sweden Junior)
7	199 (from Los Angeles)	Peter Stoykewych	D	Canada	Winnipeg South Blues (MJHL)

== See also ==
- 2010–11 NHL season
