= Jeff LoVecchio =

American ice hockey player (born 1985)

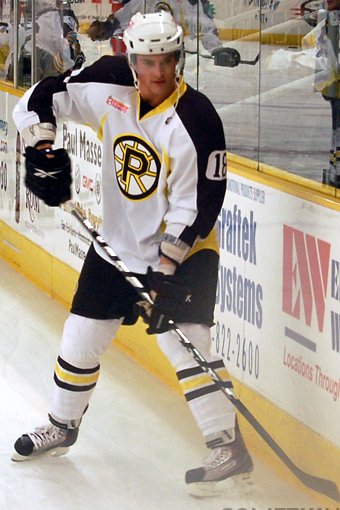
- LoVecchio with the Providence Bruins in 2010
- Born: August 26, 1985 (age 40) Chesterfield, Missouri, USA
- Height: 6 ft 2 in (188 cm)
- Weight: 195 lb (88 kg; 13 st 13 lb)
- Position: Left wing
- Shoots: Left
- ALIH team Former teams: Nippon Paper Cranes; Providence Bruins; Rochester Americans; San Antonio Rampage; HC Alleghe; Lillehammer IK; Alba Volán Székesfehérvár; Lørenskog IK
- NHL draft: Undrafted
- Playing career: 2008–present

Jeff LoVecchio (born August 26, 1985) is an American professional ice hockey Left wing who last played for the Nippon Paper Cranes of the Asia League Ice Hockey (ALIH).

== Playing career ==
On March 18, 2008, LoVecchio was signed as a free agent to a two-year entry-level contract by the Boston Bruins after attending the Western Michigan University and was assigned to their AHL affiliate, the Providence Bruins, for the remainder of the 2007–08 AHL season. In the off-season, however, LoVecchio sustained a concussion from skating and was forced to miss the entire 2008–09 season.

On December 9, 2010, he was traded from the Bruins, along with Jordan Knackstedt, to the Florida Panthers in exchange for Sean Zimmerman.

After his second season abroad with Lillehammer IK of the GET-ligaen, LoVecchio opted to change European leagues for the third consecutive year, signing a one-year contract with Hungarian club, Alba Volán Székesfehérvár who compete in the EBEL on June 23, 2014.

LoVecchio returned for one season in the GET-ligaen with Lørenskog IK, before signing, alongside teammate Wacey Rabbit, to a one-year contract with Japanese club, Nippon Paper Cranes of the ALIH on July 28, 2015.

== Career statistics ==
| | | | Regular season | | | | | Playoffs |
| Season | Team | League | GP | G | A | Pts | PIM | GP | G | A | Pts | PIM |
|---|---|---|---|---|---|---|---|---|---|---|---|---|
| 2002–03 | River City Lancers | USHL | 26 | 1 | 2 | 3 | 28 | 5 | 0 | 0 | 0 | 5 |
| 2003–04 | River City Lancers | USHL | 58 | 16 | 13 | 29 | 29 | 3 | 0 | 1 | 1 | 2 |
| 2004–05 | Omaha Lancers | USHL | 57 | 17 | 27 | 44 | 82 | 5 | 1 | 0 | 1 | 0 |
| 2005–06 | Western Michigan University | CCHA | 40 | 7 | 11 | 18 | 46 | — | — | — | — | — |
| 2006–07 | Western Michigan University | CCHA | 37 | 19 | 15 | 34 | 24 | — | — | — | — | — |
| 2007–08 | Western Michigan University | CCHA | 36 | 9 | 12 | 21 | 28 | — | — | — | — | — |
| 2007–08 | Providence Bruins | AHL | 14 | 3 | 2 | 5 | 6 | 6 | 0 | 1 | 1 | 2 |
| 2009–10 | Providence Bruins | AHL | 65 | 15 | 9 | 24 | 32 | — | — | — | — | — |
| 2010–11 | Providence Bruins | AHL | 22 | 0 | 3 | 3 | 9 | — | — | — | — | — |
| 2010–11 | Rochester Americans | AHL | 51 | 8 | 8 | 16 | 25 | — | — | — | — | — |
| 2011–12 | Utah Grizzlies | ECHL | 26 | 10 | 13 | 23 | 54 | 2 | 0 | 1 | 1 | 2 |
| 2011–12 | San Antonio Rampage | AHL | 12 | 0 | 0 | 0 | 12 | — | — | — | — | — |
| 2012–13 | HC Alleghe | ITL | 43 | 21 | 20 | 41 | 54 | 5 | 1 | 3 | 4 | 12 |
| 2013–14 | Lillehammer IK | GET | 45 | 26 | 32 | 58 | 106 | 12 | 5 | 9 | 14 | 4 |
| 2014–15 | Alba Volán Székesfehérvár | EBEL | 39 | 21 | 14 | 35 | 53 | — | — | — | — | — |
| 2014–15 | Lørenskog IK | GET | 9 | 3 | 2 | 5 | 14 | 6 | 2 | 1 | 3 | 18 |
| 2015–16 | Nippon Paper Cranes | AL | 48 | 26 | 30 | 56 | 62 | 5 | 2 | 0 | 2 | 2 |
| AHL totals | | | 164 | 26 | 22 | 48 | 84 | 6 | 0 | 1 | 1 | 2 |
