= Juraj Šimek =

Slovak-born Swiss ice hockey player

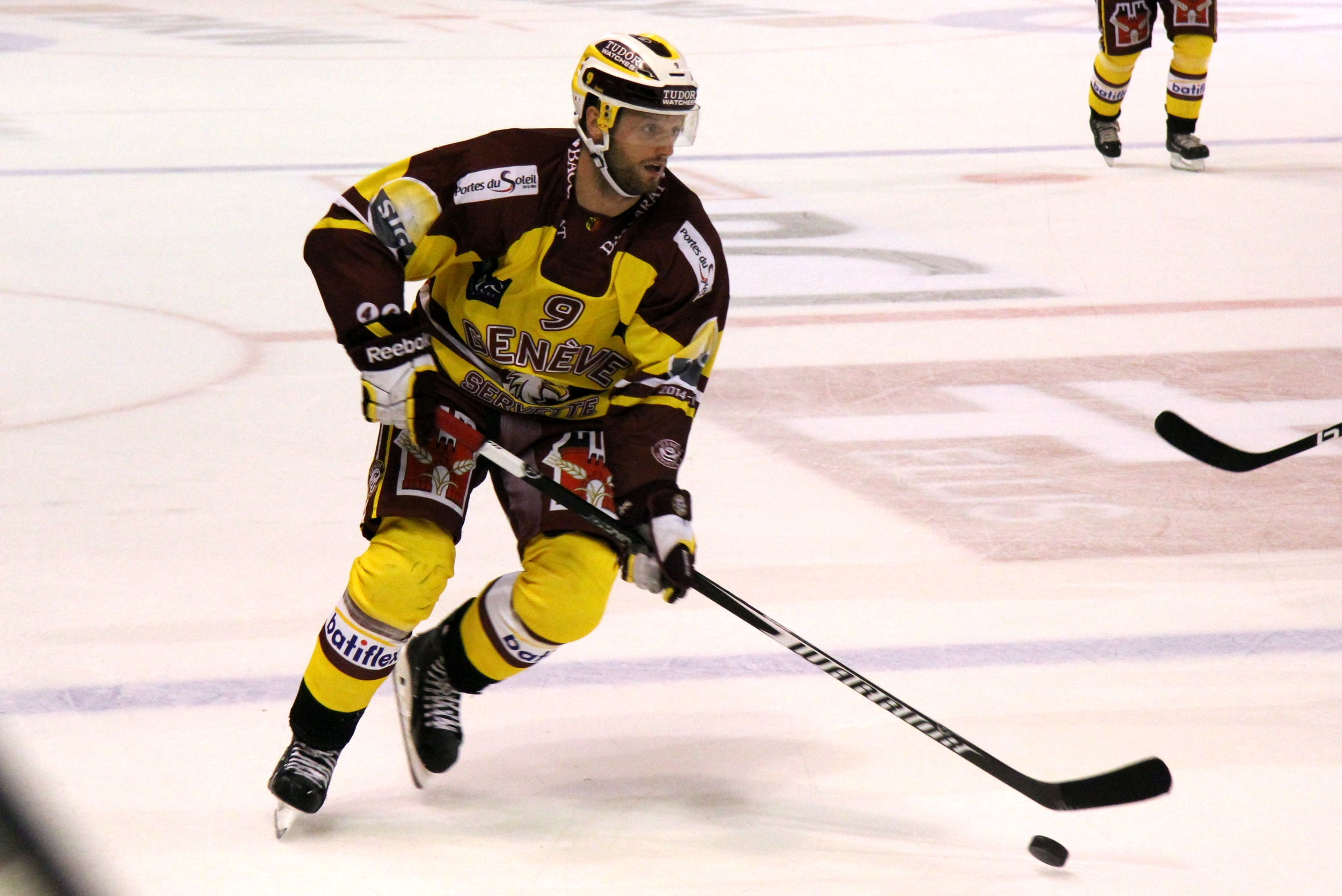
- Born: 29 September 1987 (age 38) Prešov, Czechoslovakia
- Height: 6 ft 0 in (183 cm)
- Weight: 190 lb (86 kg; 13 st 8 lb)
- Position: Right wing
- Shoots: Left
- PHL team Former teams: GKS Katowice; EHC Kloten; Manitoba Moose; Norfolk Admirals; Providence Bruins; Genève-Servette HC; TPS; HC Lugano; SC Rapperswil-Jona Lakers; HC 21 Prešov
- NHL draft: 167th overall, 2006; Vancouver Canucks
- Playing career: 2004–present

Juraj Šimek (born 29 September 1987) is a Slovak-born Swiss professional ice hockey player. He is currently playing with GKS Katowice of the Polska Hokej Liga (PHL).

== Playing career ==
Before moving to North America, Šimek played in Switzerland between the junior and senior (Nationalliga A and B) leagues with Bern, Kloten, and Biel. After a strong season with Kloten's junior team in 2005–06, posting 68 points in 45 games, Šimek was chosen in the sixth round, 167th overall, by the Vancouver Canucks in the 2006 NHL entry draft.

Selected by the Brandon Wheat Kings with their first choice in the 2006 Canadian Hockey League (CHL) Import Draft, Šimek made his North American debut in 2006–07 with the Wheat Kings. He scored at a near point-per-game pace, with 57 points in 58 games and received his first NHL contract in the off-season, on July 23, 2007, with the Canucks.

Signed with the Canucks, he made his AHL debut with Vancouver's minor league affiliate, the Manitoba Moose, in 2007–08 and scored 17 points in 66 games. On October 6, 2008, he was traded along with Lukáš Krajíček to the Tampa Bay Lightning for Michel Ouellet and Shane O'Brien.

On December 9, 2010, Tampa Bay traded Šimek to the Boston Bruins in exchange for minor league forward Levi Nelson.

On October 15, 2019, Genève-Servette HC managed to loan struggling Šimek to the SC Rapperswil-Jona Lakers through November 10. It was later announced that Šimek would remain with the Lakers for the remainder of the 2019/20 season.

On April 29, 2020, Šimek joined EHC Kloten of the second-tier Swiss League on a one-year deal.

== International play ==
Šimek has played for the Swiss national junior team twice at the World Junior Championships.

== Career statistics ==
=== Regular season and playoffs ===
| | | | Regular season | | | | | Playoffs |
| Season | Team | League | GP | G | A | Pts | PIM | GP | G | A | Pts | PIM |
|---|---|---|---|---|---|---|---|---|---|---|---|---|
| 2002–03 | SC Bern | SUI U20 | 2 | 1 | 0 | 1 | 0 | 2 | 0 | 0 | 0 | 0 |
| 2003–04 | Kloten Flyers | SUI U20 | 36 | 8 | 6 | 14 | 28 | — | — | — | — | — |
| 2004–05 | Kloten Flyers | SUI U20 | 39 | 17 | 13 | 30 | 62 | 9 | 2 | 3 | 5 | 10 |
| 2004–05 | Kloten Flyers | NLA | 18 | 0 | 0 | 0 | 0 | — | — | — | — | — |
| 2005–06 | Kloten Flyers | SUI U20 | 42 | 21 | 42 | 63 | 196 | — | — | — | — | — |
| 2005–06 | Kloten Flyers | NLA | 8 | 0 | 1 | 1 | 4 | — | — | — | — | — |
| 2005–06 | EHC Biel | SUI.2 | 3 | 0 | 0 | 0 | 2 | — | — | — | — | — |
| 2006–07 | Brandon Wheat Kings | WHL | 58 | 28 | 29 | 57 | 41 | 9 | 1 | 5 | 6 | 6 |
| 2007–08 | Manitoba Moose | AHL | 66 | 7 | 10 | 17 | 30 | 1 | 1 | 0 | 1 | 0 |
| 2008–09 | Norfolk Admirals | AHL | 63 | 9 | 13 | 22 | 49 | — | — | — | — | — |
| 2009–10 | Norfolk Admirals | AHL | 75 | 21 | 15 | 36 | 31 | — | — | — | — | — |
| 2010–11 | Norfolk Admirals | AHL | 21 | 3 | 6 | 9 | 0 | — | — | — | — | — |
| 2010–11 | Providence Bruins | AHL | 11 | 0 | 0 | 0 | 6 | — | — | — | — | — |
| 2010–11 | Genève–Servette HC | NLA | 2 | 0 | 0 | 0 | 0 | 5 | 1 | 0 | 1 | 2 |
| 2011–12 | Genève–Servette HC | NLA | 50 | 11 | 9 | 20 | 26 | — | — | — | — | — |
| 2012–13 | Genève–Servette HC | NLA | 50 | 20 | 10 | 30 | 20 | 7 | 4 | 0 | 4 | 4 |
| 2013–14 | Genève–Servette HC | NLA | 50 | 9 | 22 | 31 | 69 | 12 | 4 | 2 | 6 | 12 |
| 2014–15 | Genève–Servette HC | NLA | 33 | 6 | 7 | 13 | 16 | — | — | — | — | — |
| 2014–15 | TPS | Liiga | 15 | 2 | 4 | 6 | 10 | — | — | — | — | — |
| 2014–15 | HC Lugano | NLA | 6 | 3 | 4 | 7 | 0 | 6 | 0 | 1 | 1 | 18 |
| 2015–16 | Genève–Servette HC | NLA | 31 | 6 | 8 | 14 | 18 | 10 | 1 | 2 | 3 | 4 |
| 2016–17 | Genève–Servette HC | NLA | 44 | 3 | 10 | 13 | 31 | 4 | 0 | 0 | 0 | 4 |
| 2017–18 | Genève–Servette HC | NL | 50 | 12 | 14 | 26 | 20 | 5 | 0 | 0 | 0 | 2 |
| 2018–19 | Genève–Servette HC | NL | 26 | 2 | 1 | 3 | 4 | 6 | 1 | 1 | 2 | 0 |
| 2019–20 | Genève–Servette HC | NL | 12 | 1 | 0 | 1 | 0 | — | — | — | — | — |
| 2019–20 | SC Rapperswil–Jona Lakers | NL | 33 | 8 | 9 | 17 | 22 | — | — | — | — | — |
| 2020–21 | EHC Kloten | SUI.2 | 42 | 9 | 6 | 15 | 44 | 10 | 1 | 2 | 3 | 29 |
| 2021–22 | EHC Kloten | SUI.2 | 25 | 2 | 5 | 7 | 41 | — | — | — | — | — |
| 2022–23 | HC 21 Prešov | SVK | 19 | 0 | 8 | 8 | 10 | — | — | — | — | — |
| 2022–23 | GKS Katowice | POL | 12 | 2 | 8 | 10 | 33 | 18 | 4 | 9 | 13 | 10 |
| NL totals | | | 413 | 81 | 95 | 176 | 230 | 55 | 11 | 6 | 17 | 46 |
| AHL totals | | | 236 | 40 | 44 | 84 | 116 | 1 | 1 | 0 | 1 | 0 |

=== International ===
| Year | Team | Event | Result | GP | G | A | Pts | PIM |
|---|---|---|---|---|---|---|---|---|
| 2005 | Switzerland | WJC18 | 9th | 5 | 2 | 0 | 2 | 2 |
| 2006 | Switzerland | WJC | 7th | 6 | 1 | 3 | 4 | 6 |
| 2007 | Switzerland | WJC | 7th | 6 | 4 | 1 | 5 | 2 |
| Junior totals | | | | 17 | 7 | 4 | 11 | 10 |
