= 2010–11 Buffalo Sabres season =

NHL hockey team season

2010–11 Buffalo Sabres
- Division: 3rd Northeast
- Conference: 7th Eastern
- 2010–11 record: 43–29–10
- Home record: 21–16–4
- Road record: 22–13–6
- Goals for: 245
- Goals against: 229

Team information
- General manager: Darcy Regier
- Coach: Lindy Ruff
- Captain: Craig Rivet (Oct.–Feb.); Vacant (Feb.–Apr.)
- Alternate captains: Paul Gaustad; Jochen Hecht; Jason Pominville; Derek Roy; Thomas Vanek (Feb.–Apr.)
- Arena: HSBC Arena
- Average attendance: 18,453

Team leaders
- Goals: Thomas Vanek (32)
- Assists: Thomas Vanek (41)
- Points: Thomas Vanek (73)
- Penalty minutes: Cody McCormick (142)
- Plus/minus: Steve Montador (+16)
- Wins: Ryan Miller (34)
- Goals against average: Ryan Miller (2.59)

The 2010–11 Buffalo Sabres season was the 41st season for the National Hockey League (NHL) franchise that was established on May 22, 1970. Due to the 2004–05 NHL lockout, this was the 40th season of play for the franchise and was celebrated as such by the team.

This was the last time that the Sabres qualified for postseason play until 2026.

== Off-season ==
To commemorate the team's 40th anniversary, the Sabres went retro, reverting to their pre-1996 logo and to the design of the first season uniforms (blue with gold and white trim) with a silver trim the team has been using as a third uniform since the 2008–09 season. The new road uniforms would be white with blue and gold trim, similar to the original 1970–71 uniforms; a new third jersey was used paying homage to the AHL Bisons that played in the city prior to 1970. The jersey would come complete with the team's 40th anniversary logo (the current logo with "1970", the team's first season, inside.)

== Regular season ==
=== Franchise sale ===
On November 30, 2010, Ken Campbell of The Hockey News reported a story that billionaire Terrence Pegula had signed a letter of intent to purchase the Sabres from owners Tom Golisano, Larry Quinn and Daniel DiPofi for US$150 million. Pegula was the founder, president and CEO of East Resources, one of the largest privately held companies in the United States before selling the company. After the report was released, Quinn claimed that the report was "untrue" but had refused further comment. The $150 million was later determined to be an undervalued amount, as Forbes magazine had valued the team at just under $170 million in 2010.

In December 2010, Pegula officially expressed interest in buying the Sabres for $170 million and submitted a letter of intent to the NHL.

In January 2021, Golisano reportedly issued a counteroffer with an asking price of US$175 million. An agreement between Pegula and Golisano to sell the team was reached on January 29, 2011, with Pegula buying the team for $189 million ($175 million with $14 million in debt included) with the Sabres and Golisano officially making an announcement in a press conference on February 3, 2011. League owners approved the sale on February 18. In the conference, it was revealed that an unnamed bidder submitted a much higher bid than Pegula's, but made the bid contingent upon moving the team. The description is consistent with that of Jim Balsillie, who has made public his efforts to move a team to Hamilton, Ontario, a move that the Sabres have actively opposed. Terry Pegula named former Pittsburgh Penguins executive Ted Black to be the team president. Pegula was introduced as the Sabres' owner in a public ceremony at HSBC Arena on February 23, accompanied by what would be the final appearance of all three members of The French Connection line before Rick Martin's death three weeks later.

=== Divisional standings ===
Northeast Division
		GP	W	L	OTL	ROW	GF	GA	Pts
**1**	**y – Boston Bruins**	**82**	**46**	**25**	**11**	**44**	**246**	**195**	**103**
**2**	**Montreal Canadiens**	**82**	**44**	**30**	**8**	**41**	**216**	**209**	**96**
**3**	**Buffalo Sabres**	**82**	**43**	**29**	**10**	**38**	**245**	**229**	**96**
4	Toronto Maple Leafs	82	37	34	11	32	218	251	85
5	Ottawa Senators	82	32	40	10	30	192	250	74

=== Conference standings ===
Eastern Conference
R		Div	GP	W	L	OTL	ROW	GF	GA	Pts
**1**	**z – Washington Capitals**	**SE**	**82**	**48**	**23**	**11**	**43**	**224**	**197**	107
**2**	**y – Philadelphia Flyers**	**AT**	**82**	**47**	**23**	**12**	**44**	**259**	**223**	106
**3**	**y – Boston Bruins**	**NE**	**82**	**46**	**25**	**11**	**44**	**246**	**195**	103
**4**	**Pittsburgh Penguins**	**AT**	**82**	**49**	**25**	**8**	**39**	**238**	**199**	106
**5**	**Tampa Bay Lightning**	**SE**	**82**	**46**	**25**	**11**	**40**	**247**	**240**	103
**6**	**Montreal Canadiens**	**NE**	**82**	**44**	**30**	**8**	**41**	**216**	**209**	96
**7**	**Buffalo Sabres**	**NE**	**82**	**43**	**29**	**10**	**38**	**245**	**229**	96
**8**	**New York Rangers**	**AT**	**82**	**44**	**33**	**5**	**35**	**233**	**198**	93
8.5
9	Carolina Hurricanes	SE	82	40	31	11	35	236	239	91
10	Toronto Maple Leafs	NE	82	37	34	11	32	218	251	85
11	New Jersey Devils	AT	82	38	39	5	35	174	209	81
12	Atlanta Thrashers	SE	82	34	36	12	29	223	269	80
13	Ottawa Senators	NE	82	32	40	10	30	192	250	74
14	New York Islanders	AT	82	30	39	13	26	229	264	73
15	Florida Panthers	SE	82	30	40	12	26	195	229	72

bold – qualified for playoffs; y – Won division; z – Placed first in conference (and division)
AT – Atlantic Division, NE – Northeast Division, SE – Southeast Division

== Schedule and results ==
=== Pre-season ===
2010 Pre-season game log
September/October: 4–2–0 (Home: 2–0–0; Road: 2–2–0)

#	Date	Visitor	Score	Home	OT	Decision	Record	Recap
1	September 25	Toronto Maple Leafs	1-3	Buffalo Sabres		Miller	1-0-0	
2	September 27	Buffalo Sabres	4-5	Toronto Maple Leafs		Enroth	1-1-0	
3	September 28 (in Dundas, Ontario)	Buffalo Sabres	2-1	Ottawa Senators		Miller	2-1-0	
4	September 30	Buffalo Sabres	5-3	Montreal Canadiens		Enroth	3-1-0	
5	October 1	Buffalo Sabres	1-3	Philadelphia Flyers		Miller	3-2-0	
6	October 3	Philadelphia Flyers	3-9	Buffalo Sabres		Miller	4-2-0	

=== Game log ===
2010–11 Game Log
October : 3-7-2 (Home: 0-4-1; Road: 3-3-1)

Game	October	Opponent	Score	Decision	Location/Attendance	Record
1	8	@ Ottawa Senators	2-1	Miller	Scotiabank Place/19,350	1-0-0
2	9	New York Rangers	3-6	Miller	HSBC Arena/18,690	1-1-0
3	11	Chicago Blackhawks	3-4	Miller	HSBC Arena/17,896	1-2-0
4	13	New Jersey Devils	0-1 (OT)	Miller	HSBC Arena/18,690	1-2-1
5	15	Montreal Canadiens	1-2	Miller	HSBC Arena/17,264	1-3-1
6	16	@ Chicago Blackhawks	3-4	Lalime	United Center/21,293	1-4-1
7	20	@ Atlanta Thrashers	4-1	Miller	Philips Arena/8,820	2-4-1
8	22	Ottawa Senators	2-4	Miller	HSBC Arena/18,009	2-5-1
9	23	@ New Jersey Devils	6-1	Miller	Prudential Center/14,228	3-5-1
10	26	@ Philadelphia Flyers	3-6	Miller	Wells Fargo Center/19,361	3-6-1
11	29	@ Atlanta Thrashers	3-4 (OT)	Miller	Philips Arena/10,172	3-6-2
12	30	@ Dallas Stars	0-4	Lalime	American Airlines Center/15,015	3-7-2

November: 6-6-1 (Home: 4-4-0; Road: 2-2-1)

Game	November	Opponent	Score	Decision	Location/Attendance	Record
13	3	Boston Bruins	2-5	Enroth	HSBC Arena/18,428	3-8-2
14	5	Montreal Canadiens	2-3	Lalime	HSBC Arena/18,026	3-9-2
15	6	@ Toronto Maple Leafs	3-2 (SO)	Enroth	Air Canada Centre/19,329	4-9-2
16	10	@ New Jersey Devils	5-4 (SO)	Enroth	Prudential Center/14,566	5-9-2
17	11	@ New York Rangers	2-3 (OT)	Enroth	Madison Square Garden/17,848	5-9-3
18	13	Washington Capitals	3-2 (OT)	Miller	HSBC Arena/18,690	6-9-3
19	15	Vancouver Canucks	4-3 (OT)	Miller	HSBC Arena/18,690	7-9-3
20	17	@ Washington Capitals	2-4	Miller	Verizon Center/18,398	7-10-3
21	19	Los Angeles Kings	4-2	Miller	HSBC Arena/18,418	8-10-3
22	20	Tampa Bay Lightning	1-2	Lalime	HSBC Arena/17,833	8-11-3
23	24	Pittsburgh Penguins	0-1	Enroth	HSBC Arena/18,250	8-12-3
24	26	Toronto Maple Leafs	3-1	Miller	HSBC Arena/18,004	9-12-3
25	27	@ Montreal Canadiens	1-3	Miller	Bell Centre/21,273	9-13-3

December: 6-5-1 (Home: 4-2-0; Road: 2-3-1)

Game	December	Opponent	Score	Decision	Location/Attendance	Record
26	3	Columbus Blue Jackets	5-0	Miller	HSBC Arena/18,529	10-13-3
27	4	@ Ottawa Senators	1-0 (SO)	Miller	Scotiabank Place/16,364	11-13-3
28	7	@ Boston Bruins	2-3 (OT)	Miller	TD Garden/17,565	11-13-4
29	9	San Jose Sharks	6-3	Miller	HSBC Arena/18,017	12-13-4
30	11	Pittsburgh Penguins	2-5	Miller	HSBC Arena/18,690	12-14-4
31	15	Boston Bruins	3-2	Miller	HSBC Arena/18,197	13-14-4
32	17	@ Florida Panthers	2-6	Miller	BankAtlantic Center/16,894	13-15-4
33	18	@ Tampa Bay Lightning	1-3	Miller	St. Pete Times Forum/17,141	13-16-4
34	21	Anaheim Ducks	5-2	Miller	HSBC Arena/18,690	14-16-4
35	23	Florida Panthers	3-4	Miller	HSBC Arena/18,690	14-17-4
36	27	@ Calgary Flames	2-5	Miller	Pengrowth Saddledome/19,289	14-18-4
37	28	@ Edmonton Oilers	4-2	Miller	Rexall Place/16,839	15-18-4

January: 7-3-1 (Home: 3-2-0; Road: 5-1-1)

Game	January	Opponent	Score	Decision	Location/Attendance	Record
38	1	Boston Bruins	7-6 (SO)	Miller	HSBC Arena/18,690	16-18-4
39	4	@ Colorado Avalanche	3-4 (OT)	Miller	Pepsi Center/12,548	16-18-5
40	6	@ San Jose Sharks	3-0	Miller	HP Pavilion/17,562	17-18-5
41	8	@ Phoenix Coyotes	2-1	Miller	Jobing.com Arena/13,905	18-18-5
42	11	Philadelphia Flyers	2-5	Miller	HSBC Arena/18,155	18-19-5
43	13	Carolina Hurricanes	3-2	Miller	HSBC Arena/18,276	19-19-5
44	15	@ New York Islanders	3-5	Miller	Nassau Veterans Memorial Coliseum/12,223	19-20-5
45	18	Montreal Canadiens	4-2	Miller	HSBC Arena/17,565	20-20-5
46	20	@ Boston Bruins	2-1 (OT)	Miller	TD Garden/18,225	21-20-5
47	21	New York Islanders	2-5	Lalime	HSBC Arena/18,690	21-21-5
48	23	@ New York Islanders	5-3	Miller	Nassau Veterans Memorial Coliseum/10,120	22-21-5
49	25	@ Ottawa Senators	3-2 (OT)	Miller	Scotiabank Place/18,990	23-21-5

February: 6-4-2 (Home: 3-3-2; Road: 3-1-0)

Game	February	Opponent	Score	Decision	Location/Attendance	Record
50	4	@ Pittsburgh Penguins	2-3	Miller	Consol Energy Center/18,315	23-22-5
51	5	Toronto Maple Leafs	6-2	Miller	HSBC Arena/18,264	24-22-5
52	8	@ Tampa Bay Lightning	7-4	Miller	St. Pete Times Forum/14,444	25-22-5
53	10	@ Florida Panthers	3-2 (OT)	Miller	BankAtlantic Center/14,559	26-22-5
54	13	New York Islanders	6-7 (OT)	Miller	HSBC Arena/18,690	26-22-6
55	15	@ Montreal Canadiens	3-2 (SO)	Enroth	Bell Centre/21,273	27-22-6
56	16	Toronto Maple Leafs	1-2	Miller	HSBC Arena/18,414	27-23-6
57	18	St. Louis Blues	0-3	Miller	HSBC Arena/18,493	27-24-6
58	20	Washington Capitals	1-2	Miller	HSBC Arena/18,690	27-25-6
59	23	Atlanta Thrashers	4-1	Miller	HSBC Arena/18,690	28-25-6
60	25	Ottawa Senators	4-2	Miller	HSBC Arena/18,690	29-25-6
61	26	Detroit Red Wings	2-3 (SO)	Miller	HSBC Arena/18,690	29-25-7

March: 9-3-2 (Home: 4-1-1; Road: 5-2-1)

Game	March	Opponent	Score	Decision	Location/Attendance	Record
62	1	@ New York Rangers	3-2	Miller	Madison Square Garden/18,200	30-25-7
63	3	@ Carolina Hurricanes	2-3 (OT)	Miller	RBC Center/15,213	30-25-8
64	5	@ Philadelphia Flyers	5-3	Miller	Wells Fargo Center/19,901	31-25-8
65	6	@ Minnesota Wild	3-2	Enroth	Xcel Energy Center/18,091	32-25-8
66	8	@ Pittsburgh Penguins	1-3	Miller	Consol Energy Center/18,314	32-26-8
67	10	@ Boston Bruins	4-3 (OT)	Miller	TD Garden/17,565	33-26-8
68	12	@ Toronto Maple Leafs	3-4	Miller	Air Canada Centre/19,347	33-27-8
69	13	Ottawa Senators	6-4	Enroth	HSBC Arena/18,690	34-27-8
70	15	Carolina Hurricanes	0-1	Miller	HSBC Arena/18,690	34-28-8
71	19	Atlanta Thrashers	8-2	Miller	HSBC Arena/18,690	35-28-8
72	20	Nashville Predators	3-4 (OT)	Miller	HSBC Arena/18,690	35-28-9
73	22	@ Montreal Canadiens	2-0	Miller	Bell Centre/21,273	36-28-9
74	25	Florida Panthers	4-2	Miller	HSBC Arena/18,690	37-28-9
75	26	New Jersey Devils	2-0	Miller	HSBC Arena/18,690	38-28-9
76	29	@ Toronto Maple Leafs	3-4	Miller	Air Canada Centre/19,483	38-29-9
77	30	New York Rangers	1-0	Enroth	HSBC Arena/18,690	39-29-9

April: 4-0-1 (Home: 2-0-0; Road: 2-0-1)

Game	April	Opponent	Score	Decision	Location/Attendance	Record
78	2	@ Washington Capitals	4-5 (OT)	Enroth	Verizon Center/18,398	39-29-10
79	3	@ Carolina Hurricanes	2-1 (OT)	Enroth	RBC Center/18,740	40-29-10
80	5	Tampa Bay Lightning	4-2	Enroth	HSBC Arena/18,690	41-29-10
81	8	Philadelphia Flyers	4-3 (OT)	Miller	HSBC Arena/18,690	42-29-10
82	9	@ Columbus Blue Jackets	5-4	Enroth	Nationwide Arena/18,717	43-29-10

2010-2011 Schedule

== Playoffs ==
The Sabres qualified for the playoffs and played the Philadelphia Flyers in the Eastern Conference Quarterfinals. The Sabres–Flyers series marked the ninth time, and first since 2006, the teams have met in the playoffs, most of any Sabres opponent. The Flyers lead the match-up four series to three. This series was the first time a Sabres–Flyers series has gone seven games.

=== Playoff log ===
2011 Stanley Cup playoffs
Eastern Conference Quarter-finals vs #2 Philadelphia Flyers : Flyers win Series 4-3 (Home 1-2; Road 2-2)

#	Date	Visitor	Score	Home	OT	Philadelphia goals	Buffalo goals	Decision	Attendance	Series	Recap
1	April 14	Buffalo Sabres	1–0	Philadelphia Flyers		None	Kaleta	Miller	19,929	1-0	
2	April 16	Buffalo Sabres	4–5	Philadelphia Flyers		Briere, Carcillo, Giroux, Leino, van Riemsdyk	Vanek (2), McCormick, Sekera	Miller	19,942	1–1	
3	April 18	Philadelphia Flyers	4–2	Buffalo Sabres		Carter, Briere, Zherdev, Timonen	Stafford, Gerbe	Miller	18,690	1-2	
4	April 20	Philadelphia Flyers	0–1	Buffalo Sabres		None	Pominville	Miller	18,690	2-2	
5	April 22	Buffalo Sabres	4–3 OT	Philadelphia Flyers	5:31	van Riemsdyk, Meszaros, Briere	Ennis (2), Vanek, Gragnani	Miller	19,959	3-2	
6	April 24	Philadelphia Flyers	5–4 OT	Buffalo Sabres	4:43	Briere (2), van Riemsdyk, Hartnell, Leino	Niedermayer, Vanek (2), Gerbe	Miller	18,690	3-3	
7	April 26	Buffalo Sabres	2–5	Philadelphia Flyers		Coburn, Briere, Giroux, Leino, Carcillo	Myers, Boyes	Miller	19,959	3-4	

Scorer of game-winning goal in italics
*Denotes if necessary

== Player statistics ==
=== Skaters ===
Note: GP = Games played; G = Goals; A = Assists; Pts = Points; +/− = Plus/minus; PIM = Penalty minutes

Regular season

Player	GP	G	A	Pts	+/−	PIM
Thomas Vanek	80	32	41	73	+2	24
Drew Stafford	62	31	21	52	+13	34
Jason Pominville	73	22	30	52	+1	15
Tyler Ennis	82	20	29	49	+0	30
Tim Connolly	68	13	29	42	−10	20
Tyler Myers	80	10	27	37	+0	40
Derek Roy	35	10	25	35	−1	16
Jordan Leopold	71	13	22	35	−11	36
Nathan Gerbe	64	16	15	31	+11	34
Paul Gaustad	81	12	19	31	+7	101
Jochen Hecht	67	12	17	29	+4	40
Andrej Sekera	76	3	26	29	+11	34
Steve Montador	73	5	21	26	+16	83
Cody McCormick	81	8	12	20	+2	142
Rob Niedermayer	71	5	14	19	−8	22
Mike Weber	58	4	13	17	+13	69
Mike Grier	73	5	11	16	+0	12
Brad Boyes^{†}	21	5	9	14	+2	6
Chris Butler	49	2	7	9	+8	26
Patrick Kaleta	51	4	5	9	−4	78
Mark Mancari	20	1	7	8	−1	12
Shaone Morrisonn	62	1	4	5	−2	32
Luke Adam	19	3	1	4	−6	12
Marc-Andre Gragnani	9	1	2	3	+0	2
Craig Rivet^{‡}	23	1	2	3	−5	12
Paul Byron	8	1	1	2	+0	2
Matt Ellis	14	0	0	0	−4	0
Colin Stuart	3	0	0	0	+1	2
Mark Parrish	2	0	0	0	−2	0

Playoffs

Player	GP	G	A	Pts	+/−	PIM
Marc-Andre Gragnani	7	1	6	7	+0	4
Tyler Myers	7	1	5	6	−4	16
Thomas Vanek	7	5	0	5	−7	0
Rob Niedermayer	7	1	3	4	+1	2
Jason Pominville	5	1	3	4	+0	2
Tyler Ennis	7	2	2	4	+4	4
Drew Stafford	7	1	2	3	+1	2
Patrick Kaleta	6	1	2	3	−1	6
Tim Connolly	6	0	2	2	−2	2
Paul Gaustad	7	0	2	2	−6	13
Nathan Gerbe	7	2	0	2	−1	18
Mike Grier	7	0	1	1	−3	0
Jochen Hecht	1	0	1	1	+0	0
Jordan Leopold	5	0	1	1	+0	4
Brad Boyes	7	1	0	1	−2	0
Steve Montador	6	0	1	1	−1	8
Derek Roy	1	0	1	1	−2	0
Cody McCormick	7	1	0	1	−2	2
Andrej Sekera	2	1	0	1	−1	4
Chris Butler	7	0	1	1	−3	10
Mike Weber	7	0	1	1	−3	6
Shaone Morrisonn	1	0	0	0	+0	2
Matt Ellis	1	0	0	0	+0	0
Mark Mancari	1	0	0	0	+0	0

=== Goaltenders ===
Note: GP = Games played; TOI = Time on ice (minutes); W = Wins; L = Losses; OT = Overtime losses; GA = Goals against; GAA= Goals against average; SA= Shots against; SV= Saves; Sv% = Save percentage; SO= Shutouts

Regular season

Player	GP	TOI	W	L	OT	GA	GAA	SA	Sv%	SO	G	A	PIM
Ryan Miller	66	3829:18	34	22	8	165	2.59	1964	.916	5	0	2	6
Jhonas Enroth	14	769:24	9	2	2	35	2.73	377	.907	1	0	0	0
Patrick Lalime	7	365:25	0	5	0	18	2.96	163	.890	0	0	1	0

Playoffs

Player	GP	TOI	W	L	GA	GAA	SA	Sv%	SO	G	A	PIM
Ryan Miller	7	409:42	3	4	20	2.93	242	.917	2	0	1	2
Jhonas Enroth	1	17:11	0	0	1	3.53	8	.875	0	0	0	0

^{†}Denotes player spent time with another team before joining Sabres. Stats reflect time with Sabres only.
^{‡}Traded mid-season. Stats reflect time with Sabres only.

== Awards and records ==
=== Awards ===
Regular Season
Player	Award	Awarded
Ryan Miller	NHL Second Star of the Week	December 6, 2010
Drew Stafford	NHL Second Star of the Week	February 14, 2011
Andrej Sekera	NHL Second Star of the Week	March 7, 2011
Ryan Miller	NHL First Star of the Week	March 28, 2011
Jhonas Enroth	NHL Third Star of the Week	April 4, 2011
Thomas Vanek	NHL First Star of the Week	April 11, 2011

=== Milestones ===
Regular Season
Player	Milestone	Reached
Jochen Hecht	700th Career NHL Game	October 11, 2010
Luke Adam	1st Career NHL Game	October 26, 2010
Cody McCormick	200th Career NHL Game	October 29, 2010
Thomas Vanek	400th Career NHL Game	October 29, 2010
Mike Grier	1,000th Career NHL Game	November 3, 2010
Jhonas Enroth	1st Career NHL Win	November 6, 2010
Jordan Leopold	100th Career NHL Assist	November 6, 2010
Lindy Ruff (coach)	1,000th Career NHL Game Coached	November 10, 2010
Steve Montador	100th Career NHL Point	November 13, 2010
Tyler Myers	100th Career NHL Game	November 13, 2010
Rob Niedermayer	1,100th Career NHL Game	November 15, 2010
Craig Rivet	900th Career NHL Game	November 20, 2010
Jason Pominville	400th Career NHL Game	November 24, 2010
Luke Adam	1st Career NHL Assist; 1st Career NHL Point	November 26, 2010
Luke Adam	1st Career NHL Goal	December 7, 2010
Mike Weber	1st Career NHL Goal	December 28, 2010
Ryan Miller	200th Career NHL Win	December 28, 2010
Lindy Ruff	500th Career NHL Win (coach)	January 6, 2011
Andrej Sekera	200th Career NHL Game	January 15, 2011
Thomas Vanek	200th Career NHL Goal	January 20, 2011
Paul Byron	1st Career NHL Game; 1st Career NHL Assist; 1st Career NHL Point	January 23, 2011
Paul Byron	1st Career NHL Goal	January 25, 2011
Jason Pominville	200th Career NHL Assist	January 25, 2011
Tim Connolly	600th Career NHL Game	February 15, 2011
Paul Gaustad	400th Career NHL Game	February 20, 2011
Steve Montador	500th Career NHL Game	February 23, 2011
Patrick Kaleta	200th Career NHL Game	March 1, 2011
Drew Stafford	300th Career NHL Game	March 3, 2011
Jordan Leopold	500th Career NHL Game	March 10, 2011
Jhonas Enroth	1st Career NHL Shutout	March 30, 2011
Marc-Andre Gragnani	1st Career NHL Assist; 1st Career NHL Point	March 30, 2011
Thomas Vanek	200th Career NHL Goal	April 2, 2011
Marc-Andre Gragnani	1st Career NHL Goal	April 3, 2011
Drew Stafford	100th Career NHL Assist	April 3, 2011
Matt Ellis	200th Career NHL Game	April 8, 2011
Paul Gaustad	100th Career NHL Assist	April 9, 2011

Playoffs
Player	Milestone	Reached
Chris Butler	1st Career NHL Playoff Game	April 14, 2011
Marc-Andre Gragnani	1st Career NHL Playoff Game; 1st Career NHL Playoff Assist; 1st Career NHL Playoff Point	April 14, 2011
Mike Weber	1st Career NHL Playoff Game	April 14, 2011
Cody McCormick	1st Career NHL Playoff Goal	April 16, 2011
Andrej Sekera	1st Career NHL Playoff Goal; 1st Career NHL Playoff Point	April 16, 2011
Marc-Andre Gragnani	1st Career NHL Playoff Goal	April 22, 2011
Tyler Myers	1st Career NHL Playoff Assist	April 22, 2011
Mike Weber	1st Career NHL Playoff Assist; 1st Career NHL Playoff Point	April 22, 2011
Chris Butler	1st Career NHL Playoff Assist; 1st Career NHL Playoff Point	April 24, 2011
Mike Grier	100th Career NHL Playoff Game	April 24, 2011
Jhonas Enroth	1st Career NHL Playoff Game	April 26, 2011
Mark Mancari	1st Career NHL Playoff Game	April 26, 2011

== Transactions ==
The Sabres have been involved in the following transactions during the 2010–11 season.

=== Trades ===
Date	Details
February 27, 2011	To St. Louis Blues 2nd-round pick in 2011	To Buffalo Sabres Brad Boyes

=== Free agents acquired ===
Player	Former team	Contract terms
Jordan Leopold	Pittsburgh Penguins	3 years, $9 million
Rob Niedermayer	New Jersey Devils	1 year, $1.15 million
Tim Conboy	Carolina Hurricanes	1 year, $550,000
Dennis McCauley	Worcester Sharks	1 year, $500,000
Shaone Morrisonn	Washington Capitals	2 years, $4.15 million
Colin Stuart	Abbotsford Heat	1 year, $550,000
Mark Parrish	Tampa Bay Lightning	1 year, $600,000
David Leggio	Portland Pirates	1 year, $500,000

=== Free agents lost ===
Player	New team	Contract terms
Henrik Tallinder	New Jersey Devils	4 years, $13.5 million
Toni Lydman	Anaheim Ducks	3 years, $9 million
Raffi Torres	Vancouver Canucks	1 year, $1 million
Tim Kennedy	New York Rangers	1 year, $550,000
Adam Mair	New Jersey Devils	1 year, $515,000

=== Claimed via waivers ===
Player	Former team	Date claimed off waivers

=== Lost via waivers ===
Player	New team	Date claimed off waivers
Craig Rivet	Columbus Blue Jackets	February 26, 2011

=== Lost via retirement ===
Player

=== Player signings ===
Player	Contract terms
Nick Crawford	3 years, $1.715 million entry-level contract
Mike Grier	1 year, $1.4 million
Alex Biega	2 years, $1.055 million entry-level contract
Jacob Lagace	3 years, $1.675 million entry-level contract
Cody McCormick	1 year, $500,000
Corey Tropp	3 years, $1.76 million entry-level contract
Mike Weber	1 year, $550,000
Patrick Lalime	1 year, $600,000
Derek Whitmore	1 year, $550,000
Patrick Kaleta	2 years, $1.815 million
Marc-Andre Gragnani	1 year, $500,000
Mark Mancari	1 year, $575,000
Matt Ellis	1 year, $625,000
Zack Kassian	3 years, $2.7 million entry-level contract
Lindy Ruff (coach)	multi-year contract extension

== Draft selections ==
The 2010 NHL entry draft was held June 25–26, 2010 at the Staples Center in Los Angeles.

2010 NHL Entry Draft Results – Buffalo Sabres
Round	Overall pick	Player	Nationality	Position	Team from	League from
1	23	Mark Pysyk	Canada	D	Edmonton Oil Kings	WHL
3	68 (from Atlanta)	Jerome Gauthier-Leduc	Canada	D	Rouyn-Noranda Huskies	QMJHL
3	75 (from Boston)	Kevin Sundher	Canada	C	Chilliwack Bruins	WHL
3	83	Matt MacKenzie	Canada	D	Calgary Hitmen	WHL
4	98 (from Atlanta)	Steven Shipley	Canada	C	Owen Sound Attack	OHL
5	143	Gregg Sutch	Canada	RW	Mississauga St. Michael's Majors	OHL
6	173	Cedrick Henley	Canada	LW	Val-d'Or Foreurs	QMJHL
7	203	Christian Isackson	United States	RW	Saint Thomas Academy	USHS-MN
7	208 (from San Jose)	Riley Boychuk	Canada	LW	Portland Winterhawks	WHL

== See also ==
- 2010–11 NHL season

== Farm teams ==
=== Portland Pirates ===
The Portland Pirates remain Buffalo's top affiliate in the American Hockey League in 2010–11.
