= 2011–12 Buffalo Sabres season =

NHL hockey team season

2011–12 Buffalo Sabres
- Division: 3rd Northeast
- Conference: 9th Eastern
- 2011–12 record: 39–32–11
- Home record: 21–12–8
- Road record: 18–20–3
- Goals for: 218
- Goals against: 230

Team information
- General manager: Darcy Regier
- Coach: Lindy Ruff
- Captain: Jason Pominville
- Alternate captains: Derek Roy; Drew Stafford; Thomas Vanek; Paul Gaustad (Oct.–Feb.)
- Arena: First Niagara Center
- Average attendance: 18,272

Team leaders
- Goals: Jason Pominville (30)
- Assists: Jason Pominville (43)
- Points: Jason Pominville (73)
- Penalty minutes: Patrick Kaleta (116)
- Plus/minus: Tyler Ennis (+11)
- Wins: Ryan Miller (30)
- Goals against average: Drew MacIntyre (1.38)

The 2011–12 Buffalo Sabres season was the 42nd season of operation (41st season of play) for the National Hockey League (NHL) franchise that was established on May 22, 1970. Their season began October 7, 2011 against the Anaheim Ducks in Helsinki, where the team named Jason Pominville the 13th full-time captain in team history. Pominville filled the vacancy left by Craig Rivet, who was claimed via waivers by the Columbus Blue Jackets during the previous season.

== Off-season ==
The Sabres signed several free agents. This was due to the new ownership giving permission to the managing staff to bid for free agents. The previous ownership allowed free agents to leave rather than pay for free agent contracts. The Sabres home also underwent a makeover. The interior of the arena was painted Sabres colors, blue and gold. The players locker rooms also received an extensive multimillion-dollar upgrade. The naming rights were transferred from HSBC to First Niagara Bank and the arena took on the name First Niagara Center.

== Regular season ==
The Sabres participated in the 2011 NHL Premiere, playing their first two regular season games in Europe. After a 2–0 start in Europe, the Sabres returned home and continued to play well. They had a record of 10–5 going into a November 12 game against the Boston Bruins, where, in the first period, Ryan Miller left his crease to play a puck and was hit by the Bruins' Milan Lucic. Miller suffered a concussion and neck injury on the hit and would go on to miss nine games; his first game back he took another blow near the head area, this time via Nashville Predators player Jordin Tootoo. Lucic was penalized for charging on the play but was not suspended or fined by the League. During the middle part of the season, injuries plagued the team. By the All-Star break the Sabres sat in 14th place in the Eastern Conference and had 225-man-games lost to injury. Jason Pominville was the only Sabre named to the All-Star Game roster. Luke Adam was one of 12 rookies selected to participate in the All-Star Skills Competition.

During the 33 game stretch from the Bruins game (November 12) to January 24, the Sabres had a record of 9–19–5. The poor play included a team record 12-game road losing streak and a run of five consecutive regulation loses on a single road trip.

Things then began to turn around with a shootout win at the New Jersey Devils on January 24, the final game before the All-Star break. The Sabres then went on an 18–5–5 run, going from 14th in the Eastern Conference back into the eighth and final playoff position on March 24 with a 3–1 win at home against the Minnesota Wild. On March 27, the Sabres faced the Washington Capitals for a pivotal game for the final playoff position. The teams entered the game tied at 84 points, with the Capitals holding the tie breaker advantage. The Sabres won the game by a convincing 5–1 score. In the second period of the game, the Sabres were ahead 3–1 and down injuries to two defensemen. Christian Ehrhoff and Andrej Sekera were both injured in the period and the Capitals were going on the power play when Robyn Regehr took a hooking penalty. The penalty left the Sabres with only three available defensemen. On the ensuing power play, Alexander Ovechkin bobbled a pass at the blue line, where Jason Pominville took the puck and scored a short-handed goal to put the Sabres up 4–1. Ryan Miller made 44 saves, improving to a personal record of 8–0–2 in his last ten games and 14–1–3 in 18 games. The win put Buffalo in sole possession of the eighth playoff spot and even in games with Washington.

The Sabres' position in eighth place was short lived, however, due to two consecutive regulation losses, first at home to Pittsburgh and then at Toronto. At home on the back end of the home and home with Toronto, the Sabres fell behind 3–0 in the first period and 5–3 in the third. The Sabres then rallied to score two goals in the final five minutes of the third to tie the game at five. In overtime, Dion Phaneuf took a delay of game penalty, where Derek Roy ended the game on the ensuing power play with his second goal of the game. The win pulled Buffalo even in points with Washington at 88. Washington still held the tie breaker advantage, with each team having two games left to play.

The Sabres would go on to pick up only one point in their final two games, ultimately failing to make the playoffs.

On April 3, 2012, following their final regular season home game, the Sabres announced a new record for average paid attendance of 18,272 per home game.

== Playoffs ==
The Sabres attempted to qualify for the playoffs. The attempt fell three points short and the Sabres finished in ninth place in the Eastern Conference.

== Standings ==
Northeast Division
Pos	Team	GP	W	L	OTL	ROW	GF	GA	GD	Pts
1	y – Boston Bruins	82	49	29	4	40	269	202	+67	102
2	x – Ottawa Senators	82	41	31	10	35	249	240	+9	92
3	Buffalo Sabres	82	39	32	11	32	218	230	−12	89
4	Toronto Maple Leafs	82	35	37	10	31	231	264	−33	80
5	Montreal Canadiens	82	31	35	16	26	212	226	−14	78

Source: National Hockey League
x – Clinched playoff spot; y – Clinched division

Eastern Conference
Pos	Div	Team	GP	W	L	OTL	ROW	GF	GA	GD	Pts
1	AT	z – New York Rangers	82	51	24	7	47	226	187	+39	109
2	NE	y – Boston Bruins	82	49	29	4	40	269	202	+67	102
3	SE	y – Florida Panthers	82	38	26	18	32	203	227	−24	94
4	AT	x – Pittsburgh Penguins	82	51	25	6	42	282	221	+61	108
5	AT	x – Philadelphia Flyers	82	47	26	9	43	264	232	+32	103
6	AT	x – New Jersey Devils	82	48	28	6	36	228	209	+19	102
7	SE	x – Washington Capitals	82	42	32	8	38	222	230	−8	92
8	NE	x – Ottawa Senators	82	41	31	10	35	249	240	+9	92
9	NE	Buffalo Sabres	82	39	32	11	32	218	230	−12	89
10	SE	Tampa Bay Lightning	82	38	36	8	35	235	281	−46	84
11	SE	Winnipeg Jets	82	37	35	10	33	225	246	−21	84
12	SE	Carolina Hurricanes	82	33	33	16	32	213	243	−30	82
13	NE	Toronto Maple Leafs	82	35	37	10	31	231	264	−33	80
14	AT	New York Islanders	82	34	37	11	27	203	255	−52	79
15	NE	Montreal Canadiens	82	31	35	16	26	212	226	−14	78

Source: National Hockey League
x – Clinched playoff spot; y – Clinched division; z – Clinched conference

== Schedule and results ==
=== Pre-season ===
2011 Pre-season Game log: 5–1–1 (Home: 2–0–0; Road: 3–1–1)

#	Date	Visitor	Score	Home	OT	Decision	Record	Recap
1	September 19	Carolina Hurricanes	1–3	Buffalo Sabres		Enroth	1–0–0	
2	September 21	Buffalo Sabres	3–1	Montreal Canadiens		Miller	2–0–0	
3	September 23	Buffalo Sabres	2–1	Toronto Maple Leafs		Miller	3–0–0	
4	September 24	Toronto Maple Leafs	2–3	Buffalo Sabres		Enroth	4–0–0	
5	September 25	Buffalo Sabres	1–4	Columbus Blue Jackets		Miller	4–1–0	
6	September 30	Buffalo Sabres	4–5	Washington Capitals	SO	Miller	4–1–1	
7	October 4	Buffalo Sabres	8–3	Adler Mannheim		Enroth	5–1–1	

=== Regular season ===
2011–12 Game Log
October: 6–4–0 (Home: 2–3–0; Road: 4–1–0)

Game	October	Opponent	Score	Decision	Location/Attendance	Record
1	7	Anaheim Ducks	4–1	Miller	Helsinki, Finland/13,349	1–0–0
2	8	@ Los Angeles Kings	4–2	Miller	Berlin, Germany/14,300	2–0–0
3	14	Carolina Hurricanes	4–3	Miller	First Niagara Center/18,690	2–1–0
4	15	@ Pittsburgh Penguins	3–2	Enroth	Consol Energy Center/18,562	3–1–0
5	18	@ Montreal Canadiens	3–1	Miller	Bell Centre/21,273	4–1–0
6	20	@ Florida Panthers	3–0	Miller	Bank Atlantic Center/14,811	5–1–0
7	22	@ Tampa Bay Lightning	3–0	Miller	St. Pete Times Forum/19,204	5–2–0
8	25	Tampa Bay Lightning	4–3	Miller	First Niagara Center/18,690	5–3–0
9	27	Columbus Blue Jackets	4–2	Enroth	First Niagara Center/18,690	6–3–0
10	29	Florida Panthers	3–2	Miller	First Niagara Center/18,690	6–4–0

November: 7–6–1 (Home: 4–4–1; Road: 3–2–0)

Game	November	Opponent	Score	Decision	Location/Attendance	Record
11	2	Philadelphia Flyers	3–2	Miller	First Niagara Center/18,299	6–5–0
12	4	Calgary Flames	2–1	Enroth	First Niagara Center/18,690	7–5–0
13	5	@ Ottawa Senators	3–2 (SO)	Enroth	Scotiabank Place/18,805	8–5–0
14	8	Winnipeg Jets	6–5 (OT)	Miller	First Niagara Center/18,690	9–5–0
15	11	Ottawa Senators	5–1	Enroth	First Niagara Center/18,690	10–5–0
16	12	@ Boston Bruins	6–2	Miller	TD Garden/17,565	10–6–0
17	14	@ Montreal Canadiens	3–2 (SO)	Enroth	Bell Centre	11–6–0
18	16	New Jersey Devils	5–3	Enroth	First Niagara Center/18,690	11–7–0
19	18	@ Carolina Hurricanes	1–0	Enroth	RBC Center/15,072	12–7–0
20	19	Phoenix Coyotes	4–2	Enroth	First Niagara Center/18,690	12–8–0
21	23	Boston Bruins	4–3 (SO)	Enroth	First Niagara Center/18,690	12–8–1
22	25	@ Columbus Blue Jackets	5–1	Enroth	Nationwide Arena/16,705	12–9–1
23	26	Washington Capitals	5–1	Enroth	First Niagara Center/18,690	13–9–1
24	29	New York Islanders	2–1	Enroth	First Niagara Center/18,690	13–10–1

December: 4–7–3 (Home: 3–2–3; Road: 1–5–0)

Game	December	Opponent	Score	Decision	Location/Attendance	Record
25	2	Detroit Red Wings	4–1	Enroth	First Niagara Center/18,690	13–11–1
26	3	@ Nashville Predators	3–2	Miller	Bridgestone Arena/17,113	14–11–1
27	7	Philadelphia Flyers	5–4 (OT)	Miller	First Niagara Center/18,690	14–11–2
28	9	Florida Panthers	2–1 (OT)	Miller	First Niagara Center/18,690	15–11–2
29	10	New York Rangers	4–1	Enroth	First Niagara Center/18,690	15–12–2
30	13	Ottawa Senators	3–2 (OT)	Miller	First Niagara Center/18,690	15–12–3
31	16	Toronto Maple Leafs	5–4	Miller	First Niagara Center/18,690	16–12–3
32	17	@ Pittsburgh Penguins	8–3	Enroth	Consol Energy Center/18,584	16–13–3
33	20	@ Ottawa Senators	4–1	Miller	Scotiabank Place/18,474	16–14–3
34	22	@ Toronto Maple Leafs	3–2	Miller	Air Canada Centre/19,473	16–15–3
35	26	Washington Capitals	4–2	Miller	First Niagara Center/18,690	17–15–3
36	28	@ New Jersey Devils	3–1	Miller	Prudential Center/17,625	17–16–3
37	30	@ Washington Capitals	3–1	Miller	Verizon Center/18,506	17–17–3
38	31	Ottawa Senators	3–2 (SO)	Enroth	First Niagara Center/18,690	17–17–4

January: 4–7–1 (Home: 2–0–1; Road: 2–7–0)

Game	January	Opponent	Score	Decision	Location/Attendance	Record
39	3	Edmonton Oilers	4–3	Miller	First Niagara Center/18,690	18–17–4
40	6	@ Carolina Hurricanes	4–2	Miller	RBC Center/16,095	18–18–4
41	7	Winnipeg Jets	2–1 (OT)	Enroth	First Niagara Center/18,690	18–18–5
42	10	@ Toronto Maple Leafs	2–0	Miller	Air Canada Centre/19,431	18–19–5
43	13	Toronto Maple Leafs	3–2	Miller	First Niagara Center/18,690	19–19–5
44	14	@ New York Islanders	4–2	Enroth	Nassau Veterans Memorial Coliseum/13,848	19–20–5
45	16	@ Detroit Red Wings	5–0	Miller	Joe Louis Arena/20,066	19–21–5
46	18	@ Chicago Blackhawks	6–2	Enroth	United Center/21,114	19–22–5
47	19	@ Winnipeg Jets	4–1	Miller	MTS Centre/15,004	19–23–5
48	21	@ St. Louis Blues	4–2	Miller	Scottrade Center/19,150	19–24–5
49	24	@ New Jersey Devils	2–1 (SO)	Miller	Prudential Center/13,735	20–24–5
50	31	@ Montreal Canadiens	3–1	Miller	Bell Centre/21,273	21–24–5

February: 7–3–3 (Home: 5–2–2; Road: 2–1–1)

Game	February	Opponent	Score	Decision	Location/Attendance	Record
51	1	New York Rangers	1–0 (SO)	Miller	First Niagara Center/18,690	21–24–6
52	4	@ New York Islanders	4–3 (SO)	Miller	Nassau Veterans Memorial Coliseum/14,618	22–24–6
53	8	Boston Bruins	6–0	Miller	First Niagara Center/18,690	23–24–6
54	10	Dallas Stars	3–2 (SO)	Miller	First Niagara Center/18,690	24–24–6
55	11	Tampa Bay Lightning	2–1	Miller	First Niagara Center/18,690	24–25–6
56	14	New Jersey Devils	4–1	Miller	First Niagara Center/18,690	24–26–6
57	16	@ Philadelphia Flyers	7–2	Enroth	Wells Fargo Center/19,725	24–27–6
58	17	Montreal Canadiens	4–3 (SO)	Miller	First Niagara Center/18,690	24–27–7
59	19	Pittsburgh Penguins	6–2	Miller	First Niagara Center/18,690	25–27–7
60	21	New York Islanders	2–1	Miller	First Niagara Center/18,690	26–27–7
61	24	Boston Bruins	2–1 (SO)	Miller	First Niagara Center/18,690	27–27–7
62	25	@ New York Rangers	3–2 (OT)	Miller	Madison Square Garden/18,200	27–27–8
63	29	@ Anaheim Ducks	2–0	Miller	Honda Center/14,972	28–27–8

March: 10–4–2 (Home: 4–1–1; Road: 6–3–1)

Game	March	Opponent	Score	Decision	Location/Attendance	Record
64	1	@ San Jose Sharks	1–0	Miller	HP Pavilion/17,562	29–27–8
65	3	@ Vancouver Canucks	5–3	Miller	Rogers Arena/18,890	30–27–8
66	5	@ Winnipeg Jets	1–3	Miller	MTS Centre/15,004	30–28–8
67	7	Carolina Hurricanes	3–2 (OT)	Miller	First Niagara Center/18,690	31–28–8
68	8	@ Boston Bruins	3–1	Enroth	TD Garden/17,565	31–29–8
69	10	@ Ottawa Senators	4–3 (SO)	Miller	Scotiabank Place/19,951	32–29–8
70	12	Montreal Canadiens	3–2 (OT)	Miller	First Niagara Center/18,690	33–29–8
71	14	Colorado Avalanche	5–4 (SO)	Miller	First Niagara Center/18,690	33–29–9
72	17	@ Florida Panthers	3–2 (SO)	Miller	BankAtlantic Center/16,827	33–29–10
73	19	@ Tampa Bay Lightning	7–3	Miller	St. Pete Times Forum/17,212	34–29–10
74	21	Montreal Canadiens	3–0	Miller	First Niagara Center/18,690	35–29–10
75	23	@ New York Rangers	4–1	Miller	Madison Square Garden/18,200	36–29–10
76	24	Minnesota Wild	3–1	Miller	First Niagara Center/18,690	37–29–10
77	27	@ Washington Capitals	5–1	Miller	Verizon Center/18,506	38–29–10
78	30	Pittsburgh Penguins	3–5	Miller	First Niagara Center/18,690	38–30–10
79	31	@ Toronto Maple Leafs	3–4	Miller	Air Canada Centre/19,446	38–31–10

April: 1–1–1 (Home: 1–0–0; Road: 0–1–1)

Game	April	Opponent	Score	Decision	Location/Attendance	Record
80	3	Toronto Maple Leafs	6–5 OT	Miller	First Niagara Center/18,690	39–31–10
81	5	@ Philadelphia Flyers	1–2	Miller	Wells Fargo Center/19,873	39–32–10
82	7	@ Boston Bruins	3–4 SO	Enroth	TD Garden/17,565	39–32–11

2011–2012 Schedule

== Player statistics ==
=== Skaters ===
Regular season
Player	GP	G	A	Pts	+/−	PIM
Jason Pominville	82	30	43	73	−7	12
Thomas Vanek	78	26	35	61	−6	52
Drew Stafford	80	20	30	50	5	46
Derek Roy	80	17	27	44	−7	54
Tyler Ennis	48	15	19	34	11	14
Christian Ehrhoff	66	5	27	32	−2	47
Nathan Gerbe	62	6	19	25	2	32
Ville Leino	71	8	17	25	−2	16
Jordan Leopold	79	10	14	24	4	28
Brad Boyes	65	8	15	23	2	6
Tyler Myers	55	8	15	23	5	33
Luke Adam	52	10	10	20	−6	14
Paul Gaustad^{‡}	56	7	10	17	−1	70
Andrej Sekera	69	3	10	13	3	18
Marcus Foligno	14	6	7	13	6	9
Marc-Andre Gragnani^{‡}	44	1	11	12	10	20
Patrick Kaleta	63	5	5	10	−5	116
Jochen Hecht	22	4	4	8	1	6
Matt Ellis	60	3	5	8	−3	25
Alexander Sulzer^{†}	15	3	5	8	2	6
Corey Tropp	34	3	5	8	0	20
Cody Hodgson^{†}	20	3	5	8	−7	2
Brayden McNabb	25	1	7	8	−1	15
Zack Kassian^{‡}	27	3	4	7	−1	20
Robyn Regehr	76	1	4	5	−12	56
Mike Weber	51	1	4	5	−19	64
Cody McCormick	50	1	3	4	−7	56
Paul Szczechura	9	1	3	4	0	4
T. J. Brennan	11	1	0	1	0	6
Travis Turnbull	3	1	0	1	0	5
Colin Stuart	2	0	0	0	−3	0
Joe Finley	5	0	0	0	−3	12
Derek Whitmore	2	0	0	0	0	0

=== Goaltenders ===
Regular season
Player	GP	TOI	W	L	OT	GA	GAA	SA	SV%	SO	G	A	PIM
Ryan Miller	61	3536	31	21	7	150	2.55	1788	.916	6	0	0	0
Jhonas Enroth	26	1399	8	11	4	63	2.70	756	.917	1	0	0	2
Drew MacIntyre	2	43	0	0	0	1	1.40	18	.944	0	0	0	0

^{†}Denotes player spent time with another team before joining Sabres. Stats reflect time with Sabres only.
^{‡}Traded mid-season. Stats reflect time with Sabres only.

== Awards and records ==
=== Awards ===
Regular Season
Player	Award	Awarded
Ryan Miller	NHL First Star of the Week	March 5, 2012
Ryan Miller	NHL Second Star of the Week	March 26, 2012
Marcus Foligno	NHL Rookie of the Month	March 2012
Ryan Miller	NHL Third Star of the Month	April 2, 2012

=== Records ===
On October 25, 2011, Brad Boyes played in his 500th consecutive NHL game, becoming the 20th player in NHL history to reach that mark. This streak ended at 513 when he was injured in the November 23 game.

=== Milestones ===
Regular Season
Player	Milestone	Reached
Brad Boyes	200th Career NHL Assist	October 7, 2011
Ryan Miller	400th Career NHL Game	October 7, 2011
Drew Stafford	200th Career NHL Point	October 15, 2011
Brad Boyes	500th Career NHL Game	October 22, 2011
Thomas Vanek	400th Career NHL Point	October 27, 2011
Corey Tropp	1st Career NHL Game	November 4, 2011
Corey Tropp	1st Career NHL Goal; 1st Career NHL Point	November 8, 2011
Corey Tropp	1st Career NHL Assist	November 11, 2011
Nathan Gerbe	100th Career NHL Game	November 12, 2011
T. J. Brennan	1st Career NHL Game; 1st Career NHL Goal; 1st Career NHL Point	November 23, 2011
Zack Kassian	1st Career NHL Game; 1st Career NHL Assist; 1st Career NHL Point	November 25, 2011
Zack Kassian	1st Career NHL Goal	November 26, 2011
Brayden McNabb	1st Career NHL Game	November 26, 2011
Joe Finley	1st Career NHL Game	December 2, 2011
Derek Roy	400th Career NHL Point	December 2, 2011
Tyler Ennis	100th Career NHL Game	December 2, 2011
Drew Stafford	100th Career NHL Goal	December 16, 2011
Derek Roy	500th Career NHL Game	December 16, 2011
Thomas Vanek	500th Career NHL Game	December 16, 2011
Thomas Vanek	200th Career NHL Assist	December 20, 2011
Derek Whitmore	1st Career NHL Game	December 20, 2011
Marcus Foligno	1st Career NHL Game	December 20, 2011
Brayden McNabb	1st Career NHL Goal; 1st Career NHL Point	December 26, 2011
Brayden McNabb	1st Career NHL Assist	December 31, 2011
Cody McCormick	300th Career NHL Game	January 3, 2012
Jason Pominville	500th Career NHL Game	January 16, 2012
Mike Weber	100th Career NHL Game	January 16, 2012
Jason Pominville	400th Career NHL Point	January 18, 2012
Ryan Miller	25th Career NHL Shutout	February 8, 2012
Tyler Myers	200th Career NHL Game; 100th Career NHL Point	February 17, 2012
Ville Leino	200th Career NHL Game	February 25, 2012
Marcus Foligno	1st Career NHL Goal; 1st Career NHL Point	March 10, 2012
Marcus Foligno	1st Career NHL Assist	March 12, 2012
Travis Turnbull	1st Career NHL Game	March 21, 2012
Christian Ehrhoff	200th Career NHL Assist	March 21, 2012
Travis Turnbull	1st Career NHL Goal; 1st Career NHL Point	March 23, 2012
Robyn Regehr	900th Career NHL Game	April 3, 2012
Andrej Sekera	300th Career NHL Game	April 3, 2012

== Transactions ==
The Sabres have been involved in the following transactions during the 2011–12 season:

=== Trades ===
Date	Details
June 25, 2011	To Calgary Flames Chris Butler; Paul Byron	To Buffalo Sabres Ales Kotalik; Robyn Regehr; 2nd-round pick in 2012
June 29, 2011	To New York Islanders 4th-round pick in 2012	To Buffalo Sabres Christian Ehrhoff (Note: Trade of negotiating rights to.)
June 29, 2011	To Chicago Blackhawks Steve Montador (Note: Trade of negotiating rights to.)	To Buffalo Sabres Conditional 7th-round pick in 2012 (Note: Condition satisfied.)
February 27, 2012	To Nashville Predators Paul Gaustad; 4th-round pick in 2013	Buffalo Sabres 1st-round pick in 2012
February 27, 2012	To Vancouver Canucks Marc-Andre Gragnani; Zack Kassian	To Buffalo Sabres Cody Hodgson; Alexander Sulzer

=== Free agents signed ===
Player	Former team	Contract terms
Ville Leino	Philadelphia Flyers	6 years, $27 million
Drew MacIntyre	Hamilton Bulldogs	1 year, $525,000
Michael Ryan	Adirondack Phantoms	1 year, $525,000
Paul Szczechura	Norfolk Admirals	1 year, $525,000
Jonathan Parker	Prince Albert Raiders	3-years, $1.605 million entry-level contract
Joe Finley	Rochester Americans	3 years, $1.575 million
Phil Varone	Rochester Americans	3 years, $1.71 million entry-level contract
Brian Flynn	University of Maine	1 year, $925,000 entry-level contract

=== Free agents lost ===
Player	New team	Contract terms
Tim Connolly	Toronto Maple Leafs	2 years, $9.5 million
Mark Mancari	Vancouver Canucks	1 year, $525,000
Rob Niedermayer	HC Lugano	1 year
Mark Parrish	Ottawa Senators	1 year, $650,000
Tim Conboy	Ottawa Senators	1 year, $600,000

=== Claimed via waivers ===
Player	Former team	Date claimed off waivers

=== Lost via waivers ===
Player	New team	Date claimed off waivers

=== Lost via retirement ===
Player
Patrick Lalime
Mike Grier

=== Player signings ===
Player	Date	Contract terms
Brayden McNabb	May 18, 2011	3-years, $2.045 million entry-level contract
Marcus Foligno	May 25, 2011	3-years, $2.48 million entry-level contract
Mark Pysyk	June 2, 2011	3-years, $2.7 million entry-level contract
Drew Stafford	June 3, 2011	4-years, $16 million
David Leggio	June 24, 2011	1 year, $525,000
Nathan Gerbe	June 29, 2011	3-years, $4.3 million
Christian Ehrhoff	June 30, 2011	10-years, $40 million
Cody McCormick	July 1, 2011	3-years, $3.6 million
Mike Weber	July 4, 2011	2-years, $1.9 million
Derek Whitmore	July 7, 2011	1 year, $525,000
Colin Stuart	July 7, 2011	1 year, $525,000
Dennis Persson	July 15, 2011	1 year, $525,000
Travis Turnbull	July 15, 2011	1 year, $525,000
Matt Ellis	July 19, 2011	2 years, $1.05 million
Andrej Sekera	July 19, 2011	4 years, $11 million
Jhonas Enroth	July 21, 2011	2 years, $1.35 million
Marc-Andre Gragnani	August 11, 2011	1 year, $550,000
Tyler Myers	September 15, 2011	7 years, $38.5 million contract extension
Matt MacKenzie	October 4, 2011	3-years, $1.8 million entry-level contract
Riley Boychuk	October 7, 2011	3-years, $1.7075 million entry-level contract
Kevin Sundher	December 15, 2011	3 years, $1.895 million entry-level contract
Jerome Gauthier-Leduc	December 30, 2011	3 years, $1.995 million entry-level contract
Connor Knapp	April 3, 2012	2 years, $1.19 million entry-level contract
Daniel Catenacci	April 3, 2012	3 years, $1.815 million entry-level contract

== Draft picks ==
Buffalo's picks at the 2011 NHL entry draft.

Round	#	Player	Position	Nationality	College/Junior/Club team (League)
1	16	Joel Armia	Right wing	Finland	Assat (SM-liiga)
3	77	Daniel Catenacci	Center	Canada	Sault Ste. Marie Greyhounds (OHL)
4	107	Colin Jacobs	Center	United States	Seattle Thunderbirds (WHL)
5	137	Alex Lepkowski	Defense	United States	Barrie Colts (OHL)
6	167	Nathan Lieuwen	Goaltender	Canada	Kootenay Ice (WHL)
7	197	Brad Navin	Center	United States	Waupaca High School (USHS-WI)

== See also ==
- 2011–12 NHL season
