= Nicolas Deslauriers =

Canadian ice hockey player (born 1991)

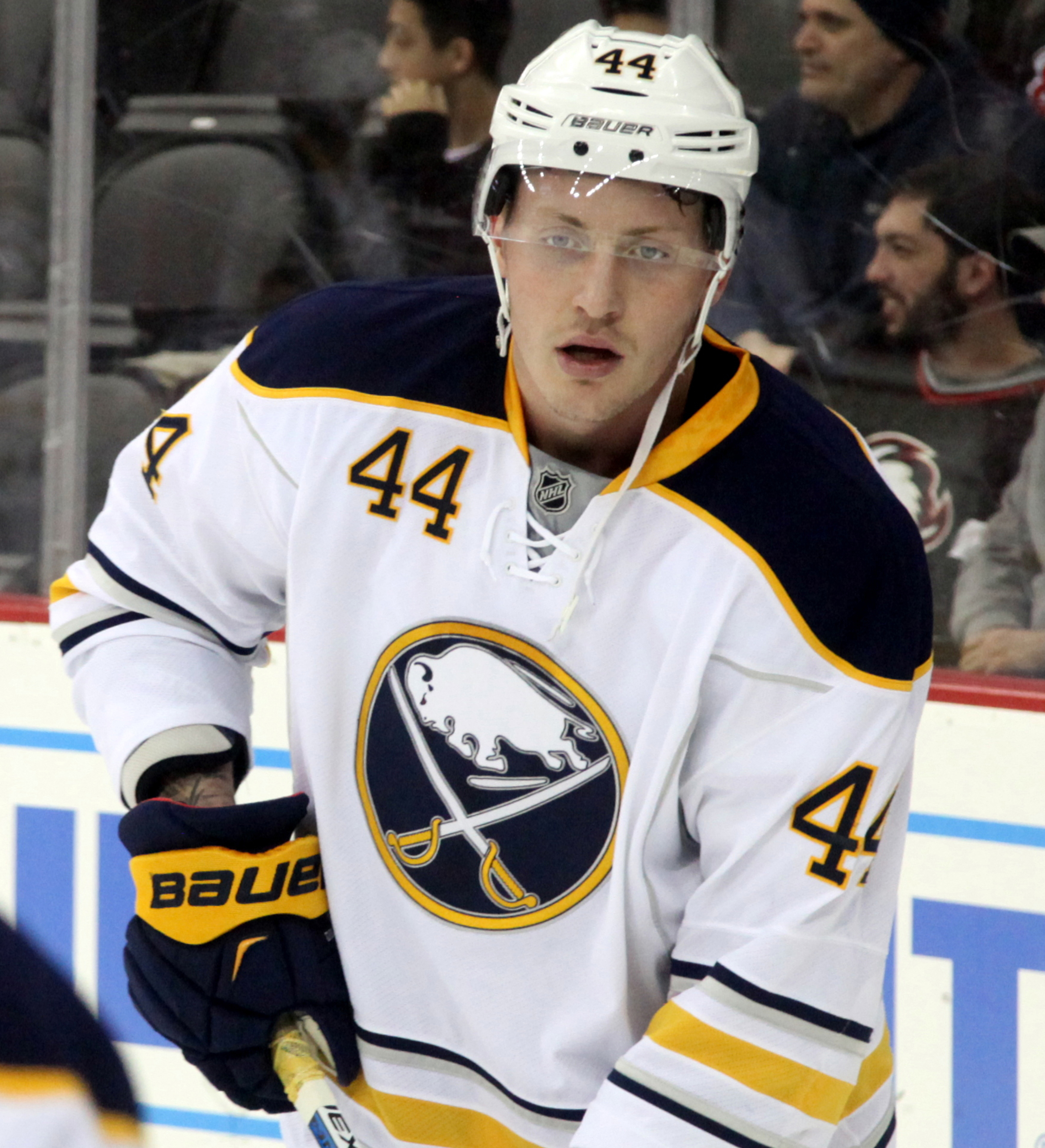
- Deslauriers with the Buffalo Sabres in 2016
- Born: February 22, 1991 (age 35) LaSalle, Quebec, Canada
- Height: 6 ft 1 in (185 cm)
- Weight: 218 lb (99 kg; 15 st 8 lb)
- Position: Left wing
- Shoots: Left
- NHL team Former teams: Carolina Hurricanes; Buffalo Sabres; Montreal Canadiens; Anaheim Ducks; Minnesota Wild; Philadelphia Flyers
- NHL draft: 84th overall, 2009; Los Angeles Kings
- Playing career: 2011–present

Nicolas Deslauriers (born February 22, 1991) is a Canadian professional ice hockey player who is a left winger for the Carolina Hurricanes of the National Hockey League (NHL). He was drafted in the third round, 84th overall, by the Los Angeles Kings at the 2009 NHL entry draft. His play has been described as a mix between an enforcer and a grinder. Deslauriers won the Stanley Cup with the Hurricanes in 2026.

== Early life ==
Deslauriers was born on February 22, 1991, in LaSalle, Quebec, to parents Penny and Stephane. His parents co-own a moving company in Quebec. Growing up, Deslauriers played both baseball and ice hockey but, after qualifying for the midget Triple-A team Châteauguay Patriotes, he dropped baseball and focused solely on ice hockey. As a child, his favourite player was Bobby Orr because he was a defenceman.

== Playing career ==
=== Amateur ===
Deslauriers played major junior ice hockey in the Quebec Major Junior Hockey League (QMJHL) with the Rouyn-Noranda Huskies and Gatineau Olympiques. At the 2009 NHL entry draft, he was drafted in the third round, 84th overall, by the Los Angeles Kings. Following the draft, Deslauriers was tied for 12th amongst league defencemen with 45 points through 65 regular season games. He was traded to the Gatineau Olympiques prior to the 2010–11 QMJHL season in exchange for two draft picks. During the 2011 QMJHL playoffs, Deslauriers led all QMJHL defencemen in postseason scoring with 20 points.

=== Professional ===
==== Los Angeles Kings ====
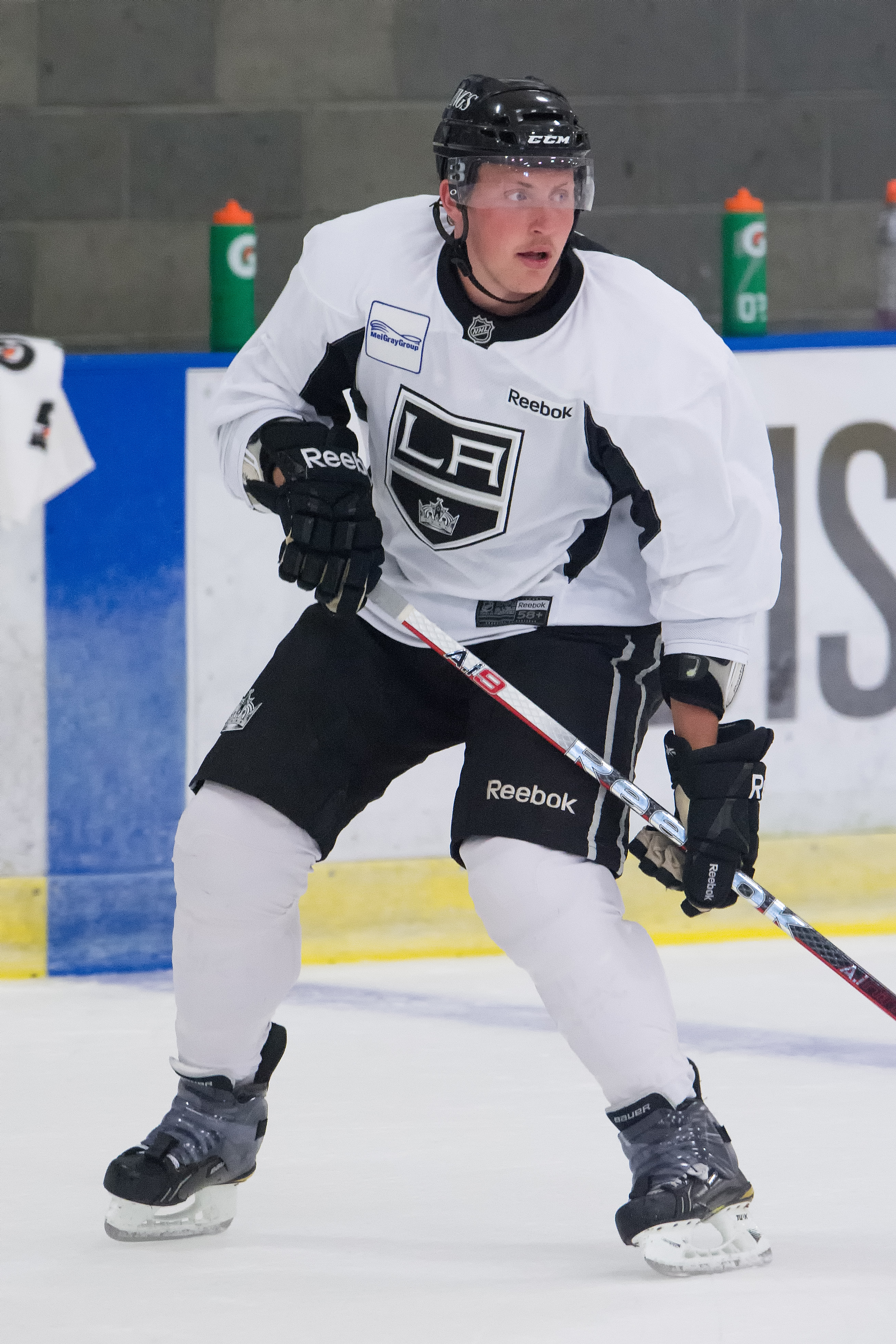
Deslauriers during the Kings' 2012 development camp

On May 31, 2011, the Kings signed Deslauriers to a three-year, entry-level contract. He was subsequently assigned to their American Hockey League (AHL) affiliate, the Manchester Monarchs. He made his professional debut with the Monarchs during the 2011–12 season and finished with 14 points through 65 games. Deslauriers began the following season with the Monarchs before being recalled to the NHL level on May 9, 2013. He played a few games with the Monarchs as a forward, but was expected to return to his natural defenceman position the following season. However, during the 2013 off-season, Jack Ferreira, special assistant to Kings general manager, suggested that Deslauriers become a full-time left winger. As such, he was asked to play the new position during training camp and recorded four goals during the preseason.

==== Buffalo Sabres ====
On March 5, 2014, Deslauriers was traded to the Buffalo Sabres, along with Hudson Fasching, in exchange for defenceman Brayden McNabb, Jonathan Parker and two draft picks. He was originally sent down to the Rochester Americans, but injuries to the Sabres' lineup earned him a quick recall. He subsequently made his NHL debut a few days later on March 7, in a 2–0 loss to the Florida Panthers. In his second NHL game, Deslauriers played 12:13 minutes of ice time and threw three hits. His play was praised by interim head coach Ted Nolan who said: "You look at Deslauriers, for a young kid too, his second game in the National Hockey League, he competed out there. You can never go wrong when you have guys that love to compete." He scored his first NHL goal on April 4, with 6:40 remaining in the third period in a 3–2 loss to the Detroit Red Wings. Deslauriers finished the season by scoring one goal through 17 of the Sabres' last 20 games. As such, he was re-signed to a two-year contract with the team on May 26.

Deslauriers remained in Buffalo during the 2014 off-season where he lost nearly 20 pounds. During the preseason, he skated alongside Sam Reinhart and was worked into a checking role with Cody McCormick and Patrick Kaleta. Having formally played as a defenceman, the 2014–15 season became Deslauriers' first as a winger. When speaking on the change, he said he felt better playing on the wing but would change positions if needed. He finished the season playing in all 82 games and tallying 15 points and 71 penalty minutes. He also finished ninth in the league with 261 hits. As a result of his play, Deslauriers was voted the teams' Rookie of the Year.

On January 4, 2016, head coach Dan Bylsma announced that Deslauriers would miss three to six weeks while recovering from a lower body injury. At the time of the injury, Deslauriers had tallied three goals and seven points through 38 games. After spending nearly a month recovering, Deslauriers returned to the Sabres lineup on February 3. Upon returning, Deslauriers was placed on team's third line alongside Cal O'Reilly and Zemgus Girgensons. Although he finished the season healthy, Deslauriers sustained a knee injury on October 30, 2016, that caused him to miss 19 games. He was limited to only 42 games during the 2016–17 season and averaged a career-low 7:25 time on ice, while recording no goals and two assists. During the off-season, he returned to his home province of Quebec.

After three full seasons in Buffalo, Deslauriers was assigned to their AHL affiliate, the Rochester Americans, before the 2017–18 season.

==== Montreal Canadiens ====
On October 4, 2017, the opening day of the 2017–18 season, Deslauriers was traded by the Sabres to the Montreal Canadiens in exchange for Zach Redmond. Upon joining the team, he was assigned to the Laval Rocket where he tallied three goals and five points in 14 games. On November 15, he was recalled to the NHL level and made his debut with the Canadiens in a 5–4 loss against the Arizona Coyotes. He remained with the team through December where he led the team with four goals through 11 games. He also led all NHL players with 54 hits, and ranked first on the team and tied for seventh in the league in goal differentials. In honour of his improved playing skills in December, Deslauriers earned the Molson Cup honour at the end of December 2017. Following this, he was promoted to play on the Canadiens' top line with Jonathan Drouin and Alex Galchenyuk. After playing in 36 games with the Canadiens, Deslauriers signed a two-year, one-way contract extension worth $1.9 million.

Upon finishing the previous season with numerous career-highs, Deslauriers rejoined the Canadiens for their 2018–19 campaign. During a preseason matchup against the New Jersey Devils on September 17, 2018, Deslauriers suffered a facial fracture and was placed on the injured reserve. He returned to the lineup for Montreal's game against the Ottawa Senators on October 20. On November 8, Deslauriers scored his first points of the 2018–19 season, when playing against his former team, the Buffalo Sabres, he assisted on a goal by Matthew Peca and scored a shorthanded goal of his own. Deslauriers was unable to replicate his previous season offensive totals, contributing with just two goals and five points through 48 games.

==== Anaheim Ducks ====
On June 30, 2019, Deslauriers was traded by the Canadiens to the Anaheim Ducks in exchange for a 2020 fourth-round draft pick. Upon joining the team for the 2019–20 season, Deslauriers tallied seven points and 80 penalty minutes through 45 games by February 2020. As such, he signed a two-year contract to remain with the Ducks organization. Following the contract signing, Deslauriers set the record for fastest hat trick in Ducks history after scoring all three goals in the first period. His third goal came at 11:49 in the first period of a 5–2 win over the Ottawa Senators.

==== Minnesota Wild ====
On March 19, 2022, just days before the trade deadline, Deslauriers was traded to the Minnesota Wild for a 2023 third-round pick.

==== Philadelphia Flyers ====
As a free agent from the Wild, Deslauriers was signed to a four-year, $7 million contract with the Philadelphia Flyers on July 13, 2022.

==== Carolina Hurricanes ====
Deslauriers was traded to the Carolina Hurricanes on March 6, 2026, in exchange for a conditional 2027 seventh-round pick. Carolina ultimately won the Stanley Cup in the 2026 Stanley Cup Final three months later, with Deslauriers signing a two-year extension on June 20 during the team's championship parade in Raleigh.

== Personal life ==
Deslauriers and his wife have four children together. He has a tattoo on the left arm saying "The future will be whatever you make it." Off the ice, Deslauriers owned the now bankrupt XPN Centre in Saint-Bruno-de-Montarville, Quebec.

== Career statistics ==
			Regular season					Playoffs
Season	Team	League	GP	G	A	Pts	PIM	GP	G	A	Pts	PIM
2006–07	Châteauguay Patriotes	QMAAA	43	2	10	12	28	3	1	0	1	4
2007–08	Rouyn-Noranda Huskies	QMJHL	42	2	7	9	38	4	0	0	0	0
2008–09	Rouyn-Noranda Huskies	QMJHL	68	11	19	30	80	6	2	2	4	8
2009–10	Rouyn-Noranda Huskies	QMJHL	65	9	36	45	72	11	2	6	8	2
2010–11	Gatineau Olympiques	QMJHL	48	13	30	43	53	24	5	15	20	19
2011–12	Manchester Monarchs	AHL	65	1	3	14	67	4	0	0	0	7
2012–13	Manchester Monarchs	AHL	63	4	19	23	80	4	2	2	4	2
2013–14	Manchester Monarchs	AHL	60	18	21	39	76	—	—	—	—	—
2013–14	Buffalo Sabres	NHL	17	1	0	1	18	—	—	—	—	—
2013–14	Rochester Americans	AHL	5	1	2	3	9	5	1	1	2	9
2014–15	Buffalo Sabres	NHL	82	5	10	15	71	—	—	—	—	—
2015–16	Buffalo Sabres	NHL	70	6	6	12	59	—	—	—	—	—
2016–17	Buffalo Sabres	NHL	42	0	2	2	38	—	—	—	—	—
2017–18	Laval Rocket	AHL	14	3	2	5	16	—	—	—	—	—
2017–18	Montreal Canadiens	NHL	58	10	4	14	55	—	—	—	—	—
2018–19	Montreal Canadiens	NHL	48	2	3	5	22	—	—	—	—	—
2019–20	Anaheim Ducks	NHL	59	7	6	13	92	—	—	—	—	—
2020–21	Anaheim Ducks	NHL	49	5	5	10	53	—	—	—	—	—
2021–22	Anaheim Ducks	NHL	61	5	5	10	90	—	—	—	—	—
2021–22	Minnesota Wild	NHL	20	3	0	3	23	5	0	0	0	0
2022–23	Philadelphia Flyers	NHL	80	6	6	12	136	—	—	—	—	—
2023–24	Philadelphia Flyers	NHL	60	1	3	4	89	—	—	—	—	—
2024–25	Philadelphia Flyers	NHL	31	2	1	3	15	—	—	—	—	—
2025–26	Philadelphia Flyers	NHL	24	0	1	1	33	—	—	—	—	—
2025–26	Carolina Hurricanes	NHL	7	0	1	1	5	1	0	0	0	4
NHL totals			708	53	53	106	799	6	0	0	0	4

== Awards and honours ==
Award	Year	Ref
NHL
Stanley Cup champion	2026	
