= Dennis McCauley =

American ice hockey player (born 1985)

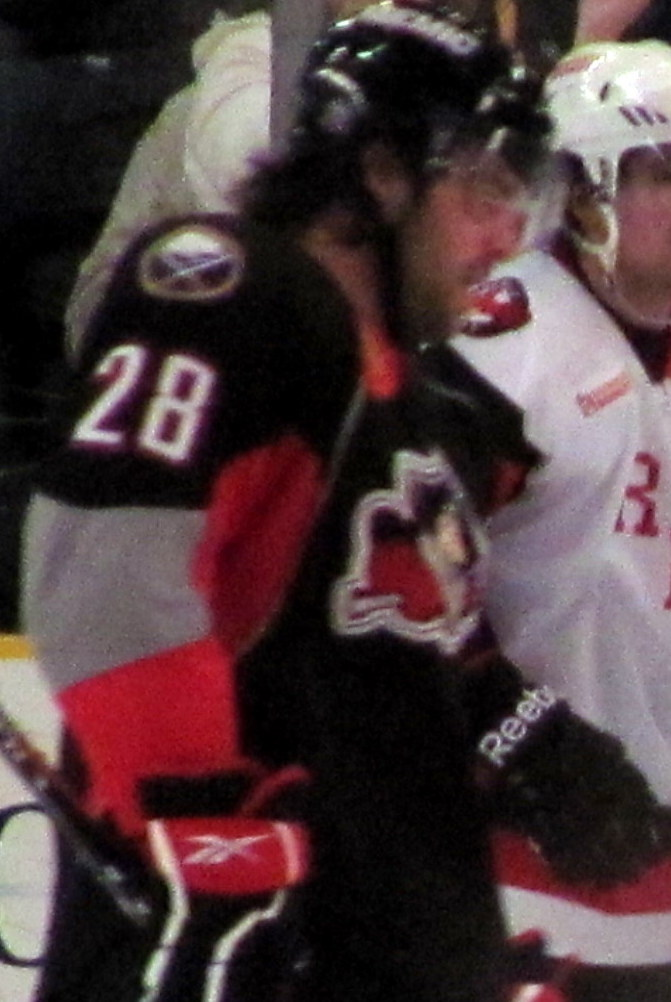
- Born: August 15, 1985 (age 40) Billerica, Massachusetts, U.S.
- Height: 6 ft 3 in (191 cm)
- Weight: 225 lb (102 kg; 16 st 1 lb)
- Position: Forward
- Shot: Left
- Played for: Worcester Sharks; Portland Pirates
- NHL draft: Undrafted
- Playing career: 2009–2015

Dennis McCauley (born August 15, 1985) is an American former professional ice hockey player. He played in the American Hockey League for the Worcester Sharks and Portland Pirates, and also spent three seasons playing in European hockey leagues.

McCauley completed his four-year college career at Northeastern University, recording 45 points (22 goals, 23 assists) in 129 games while recording 266 penalty minutes. On October 6, 2009, McCauley signed a one-year contract with the Worcester Sharks. In 45 games with Worcester, he recorded 10 goals and four assists for 14 points.

On July 30, 2010, McCauley was signed as a free agent by the Buffalo Sabres. He spent the entire 2010–11 season with their AHL affiliate, the Portland Pirates, posting 33 points (12 goals, 21 assists) in 73 games.

After a productive season with the Pirates, McCauley became an unrestricted free agent. On October 4, 2011, he signed a one-year contract with the Reading Royals of the ECHL.

McCauley finished his professional career during the 2014–15 season with Cracovia Krakow, a team based in Poland.
