= Tyler Ennis (ice hockey) =

Canadian ice hockey player (born 1989)

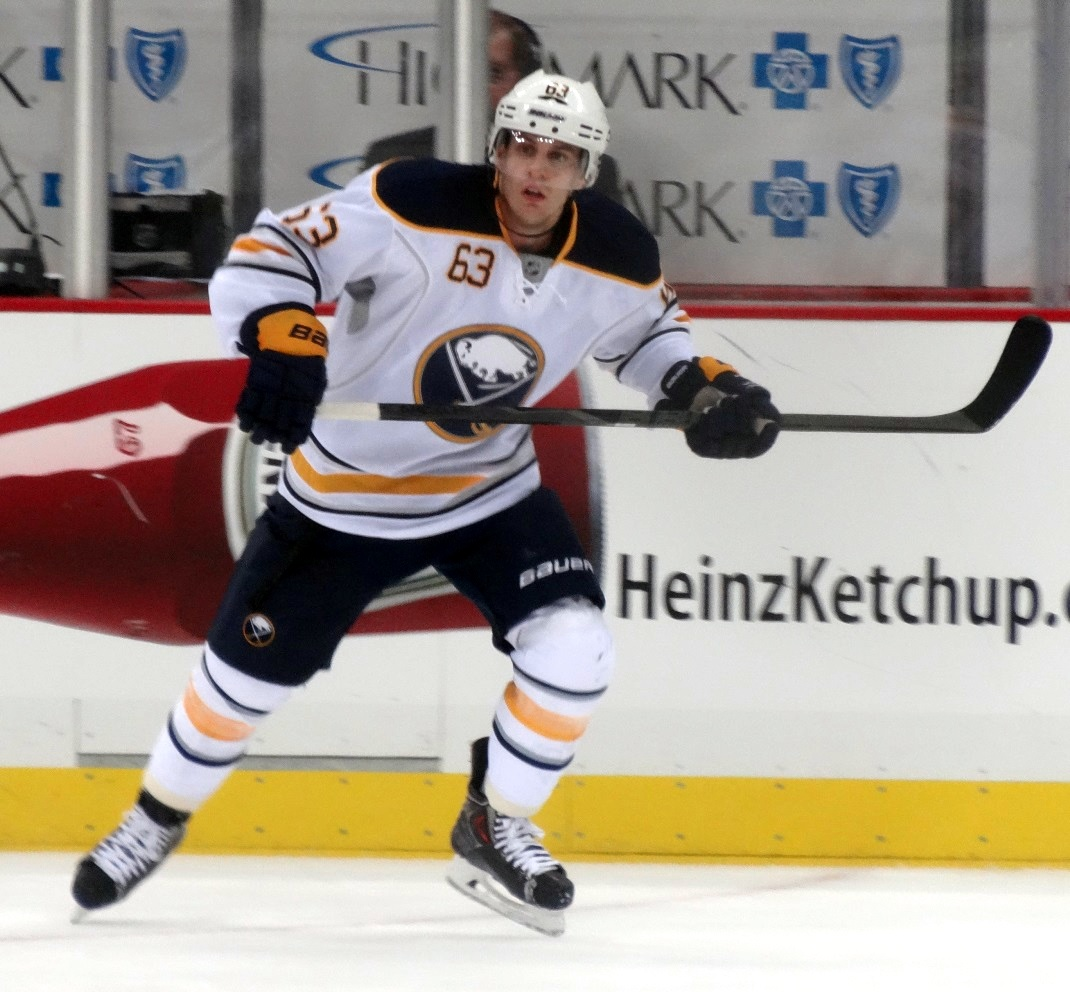
- Ennis with the Buffalo Sabres in 2013
- Born: October 6, 1989 (age 36) Edmonton, Alberta, Canada
- Height: 5 ft 9 in (175 cm)
- Weight: 176 lb (80 kg; 12 st 8 lb)
- Position: Forward
- Shot: Left
- Played for: Buffalo Sabres; SCL Tigers; Minnesota Wild; Toronto Maple Leafs; Ottawa Senators; Edmonton Oilers; SC Bern; Adler Mannheim
- National team: Canada
- NHL draft: 26th overall, 2008; Buffalo Sabres
- Playing career: 2009–2024

Tyler Foster Ennis (born October 6, 1989) is a Canadian former professional ice hockey forward.

He was selected by the Buffalo Sabres of the National Hockey League (NHL) in the first round, 26th overall, in the 2008 NHL entry draft from the Medicine Hat Tigers of the major junior Western Hockey League (WHL). He played 700 games in the NHL for the Sabres, Toronto Maple Leafs, Minnesota Wild, Ottawa Senators, and Edmonton Oilers. He also played for the SCL Tigers and SC Bern in Switzerland. Ennis retired on January 17, 2024 after suffering a neck injury on November 21, 2023.

Internationally, Ennis represented Canada, winning gold medals at the 2009 IIHF World Junior Championships and the 2015 IIHF World Championship, where he scored the gold medal-winning goal. He also represented Canada at the 2022 Spengler Cup.

== Playing career ==
=== Junior ===
Ennis began his major junior career in the Western Hockey League (WHL) with the Medicine Hat Tigers in 2005–06, recording 10 points in a 43-game rookie season. The following season, he became a key contributor to the Tigers' offence with a 26-goal, 50-point campaign. Ennis went on to add 12 points in 20 playoff games as the Tigers defeated the defending WHL champion Vancouver Giants in a seven-game Ed Chynoweth Cup final. The WHL title earned the Tigers a berth in the 2007 Memorial Cup, hosted by the runner-up Giants, whom they met in the tournament final once more, but lost by a 3–1 score. Ennis contributed a team-high four points in four games, fifth in tournament scoring.

The following season, in 2007–08, Ennis' NHL draft eligible year, he ascended to a team-leading 91 points, fourth in WHL scoring. That off-season, he was selected in the 2008 NHL entry draft 26th overall by the Buffalo Sabres. In 2008–09, his fourth season with the Tigers, Ennis was named WHL Player of the Week for the week ending February 22, 2009, after an eight-point performance in three games. Ennis followed up his player of the week honours with a six-goal performance on February 27, scoring all his team's goals in a 6–2 win against the Prince Albert Raiders. He was just one goal shy of tying the WHL record of seven goals in a game, held by five players.

=== Professional ===
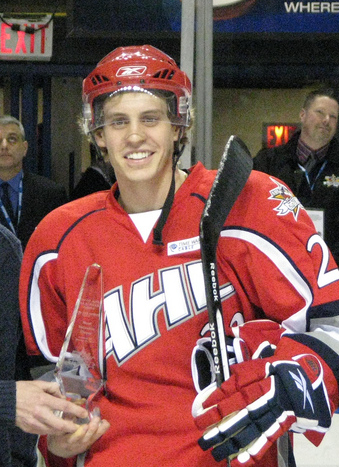
At the 2010 AHL All-Star Game.

==== Buffalo Sabres ====
Ennis made his NHL debut on November 14, 2009, against the Philadelphia Flyers. He scored his first NHL goal that game against Flyers' goaltender Ray Emery. Ennis spent most of the 2009–10 season with Buffalo's American Hockey League (AHL) affiliate, the Portland Pirates. He finished the campaign with 23 goals and 42 assists for 65 points; his 23 goals was tied for the AHL lead among rookies. At the end of the season, Ennis became the second straight Pirates player selected by the AHL's coaches, players and media to receive the Dudley "Red" Garrett Memorial Award as the top rookie in the AHL, following team mate Nathan Gerbe the year prior. After Buffalo centre Tim Connolly suffered an injury, Ennis was called up for the Sabres' final nine regular season games, ending the NHL regular season with nine points in ten games and earning a spot as a consistent starter in the Stanley Cup playoffs for the Sabres. He finished the playoffs with a team-best three assists and tied with Jason Pominville with a team-best four points.

During the 2010–11 season, Ennis played all 82 games, registering 20 goals and 29 assists while the Sabres clinched the seventh spot in the Eastern Conference, securing a first-round matchup with the Philadelphia Flyers in the 2011 playoffs. Ennis played a key role during the series, scoring two goals and two assists, including the overtime game-winning goal on Michael Leighton in Game 5. The Sabres were eventually eliminated by the Flyers in Game 7. The following season, Ennis was placed on the injured reserve twice for a lingering ankle sprain that first occurred in a game against the Tampa Bay Lightning. Ennis rejoined the Sabres after the 2012 NHL All-Star Game. At the time, the Sabres were ranked last in the Eastern Conference. In an attempt to shake things up in Buffalo, head coach Lindy Ruff moved Ennis from left wing to centre, his natural position, playing alongside Drew Stafford and rookie Marcus Foligno. Their line caught immediate chemistry leading the Sabres offensively, vying for a spot in the 2012 playoffs. The Sabres ultimately fell short in their quest for the playoffs, finishing ninth. Ennis finished the season with 15 goals and 19 assists in 48 games.

The following season, during the 2012–13 NHL lockout, Ennis (along with best friend Jared Spurgeon) signed to play for the SCL Tigers of the National League A (NLA) in Switzerland.

On June 23, 2014, as a restricted free agent, Ennis signed a five-year, $23 million contract extension with the Sabres. Ennis led the Sabres in goals during the 2013–14 and 2014–15 seasons with 21 and 20, respectively, but the team finished last in the league both seasons.

Ennis missed most of the 2015–16 season with concussion symptoms as a result of two concussions, one from a hit by St. Louis Blues defenceman Robert Bortuzzo and another from a hit by Washington Capitals forward Alexander Ovechkin.

==== Minnesota Wild ====
Following his eighth season with the Sabres in 2016–17, Ennis was traded (along with Marcus Foligno and a third-round pick in 2018) to the Minnesota Wild in exchange for Marco Scandella, Jason Pominville and a fourth-round pick in 2018 on June 30, 2017. In his first season with the Wild in 2017–18, Ennis struggled to find his footing within the organization. Used as a depth forward, Ennis scored 8 goals and 22 points in 73 games and was a frequent healthy scratch through the 2018 playoffs in the Wild's first-round defeat.

==== Toronto Maple Leafs ====
On June 30, 2018, Ennis was bought-out from the remaining year of his initial five-year contract by the Wild, releasing him to free agency. On July 6, 2018, as a free agent, Ennis signed a one-year, $650,000 contract with the Toronto Maple Leafs. On March 4, 2019, in the Maple Leafs' 6–2 win over the Calgary Flames, Ennis recorded his first career hat-trick.

==== Ottawa Senators and Edmonton Oilers ====
Despite expressing interest in re-signing with the Maple Leafs, Ennis signed a one-year, $800,000 contract with the Ottawa Senators on July 1, 2019. In the 2019–20 season, Ennis continued to rebound offensively with the Senators, contributing with 14 goals and 33 points through 61 games. With Ottawa out of playoff contention at the NHL trade deadline, Ennis was traded to his hometown club, the Edmonton Oilers, in exchange for a fifth-round 2021 NHL entry draft selection on February 24, 2020. Ennis re-signed with the Oilers in the off-season on a one-year deal but struggled during the 2020-2021 campaign. He was healthy scratched numerous times throughout the season and eventually cleared waivers on January 26, 2021. He suited up in two of Edmonton's four playoff games where the team were swept by the Winnipeg Jets.

Ennis returned to the Ottawa Senators for the 2021–22 season after signing a one-year, $900,000 contract. He found success once again with the Senators and scored his second career hat-trick on January 25, 2022.

=== SC Bern ===
After going unsigned through the NHL off-season, Ennis signed with SC Bern of the top tier Swiss league for the 2022–23 season.

=== Adler Mannheim and retirement ===
Ennis signed a one-year contract with Adler Mannheim of the Deutsche Eishockey Liga (DEL) on October 21, 2023. He played seven games for the team, totaling five assists, before suffering a neck injury against the SC Rapperswil-Jona Lakers on November 21. The injury led to his retirement on January 17, 2024.

== International play ==
Medal record

Representing Canada

Ice hockey

World Championships
| Gold medal – first place | 2015 Czech Republic | |

World Junior Championships
| Gold medal – first place | 2009 Canada | |

During his fourth WHL season, Ennis was named to Team Canada for the 2009 World Junior Championships in Ottawa. He helped Canada to a fifth-straight gold medal, defeating Sweden in the final.

Ennis played for Canada at the 2015 IIHF World Championship, where Canada won the gold medal for the first time since 2007 with a perfect 10–0 record; in the gold medal game, Ennis scored the winning goal in Canada's 6–1 win over Russia.

== Personal life ==
Ennis and his childhood best friend and former Wild teammate Jared Spurgeon were born less than two months apart and grew up in the same Edmonton neighbourhood, playing on the same teams, often with their fathers coaching, and spending summers at the Spurgeon family's lake cabin.

== Career statistics ==
=== Regular season and playoffs ===
| | | | Regular season | | | | | Playoffs |
| Season | Team | League | GP | G | A | Pts | PIM | GP | G | A | Pts | PIM |
|---|---|---|---|---|---|---|---|---|---|---|---|---|
| 2004–05 | Knights of Columbus Pats | AMHL | 36 | 15 | 17 | 32 | 10 | — | — | — | — | — |
| 2005–06 | Medicine Hat Tigers | WHL | 43 | 3 | 7 | 10 | 10 | 7 | 0 | 0 | 0 | 0 |
| 2006–07 | Medicine Hat Tigers | WHL | 71 | 26 | 24 | 50 | 30 | 22 | 8 | 4 | 12 | 6 |
| 2007–08 | Medicine Hat Tigers | WHL | 70 | 43 | 48 | 91 | 42 | 5 | 0 | 4 | 4 | 6 |
| 2008–09 | Medicine Hat Tigers | WHL | 61 | 43 | 42 | 85 | 21 | 11 | 8 | 11 | 19 | 10 |
| 2009–10 | Portland Pirates | AHL | 69 | 23 | 42 | 65 | 12 | — | — | — | — | — |
| 2009–10 | Buffalo Sabres | NHL | 10 | 3 | 6 | 9 | 6 | 6 | 1 | 3 | 4 | 0 |
| 2010–11 | Buffalo Sabres | NHL | 82 | 20 | 29 | 49 | 30 | 7 | 2 | 2 | 4 | 4 |
| 2011–12 | Buffalo Sabres | NHL | 48 | 15 | 19 | 34 | 14 | — | — | — | — | — |
| 2012–13 | SCL Tigers | NLA | 9 | 3 | 5 | 8 | 0 | — | — | — | — | — |
| 2012–13 | Buffalo Sabres | NHL | 47 | 10 | 21 | 31 | 16 | — | — | — | — | — |
| 2013–14 | Buffalo Sabres | NHL | 80 | 21 | 22 | 43 | 42 | — | — | — | — | — |
| 2014–15 | Buffalo Sabres | NHL | 78 | 20 | 26 | 46 | 37 | — | — | — | — | — |
| 2015–16 | Buffalo Sabres | NHL | 23 | 3 | 8 | 11 | 11 | — | — | — | — | — |
| 2016–17 | Buffalo Sabres | NHL | 51 | 5 | 8 | 13 | 12 | — | — | — | — | — |
| 2017–18 | Minnesota Wild | NHL | 73 | 8 | 14 | 22 | 12 | 1 | 0 | 0 | 0 | 0 |
| 2018–19 | Toronto Maple Leafs | NHL | 51 | 12 | 6 | 18 | 2 | 5 | 0 | 2 | 2 | 2 |
| 2019–20 | Ottawa Senators | NHL | 61 | 14 | 19 | 33 | 16 | — | — | — | — | — |
| 2019–20 | Edmonton Oilers | NHL | 9 | 2 | 2 | 4 | 4 | 3 | 1 | 1 | 2 | 4 |
| 2020–21 | Edmonton Oilers | NHL | 30 | 3 | 6 | 9 | 6 | 2 | 0 | 0 | 0 | 0 |
| 2021–22 | Ottawa Senators | NHL | 57 | 8 | 16 | 24 | 16 | — | — | — | — | — |
| 2022–23 | SC Bern | NL | 37 | 13 | 20 | 33 | 8 | 5 | 1 | 2 | 3 | 2 |
| 2023–24 | Adler Mannheim | DEL | 7 | 0 | 5 | 5 | 2 | — | — | — | — | — |
| NHL totals | | | 700 | 144 | 202 | 346 | 224 | 24 | 4 | 8 | 12 | 10 |

=== International ===
| Year | Team | Event | Result | GP | G | A | Pts | PIM |
|---|---|---|---|---|---|---|---|---|
| 2006 | Canada Pacific | U17 | 4th | 6 | 5 | 4 | 9 | 6 |
| 2006 | Canada | IH18 | 1st place, gold medalist(s) | 4 | 1 | 3 | 4 | 2 |
| 2009 | Canada | WJC | 1st place, gold medalist(s) | 6 | 3 | 4 | 7 | 0 |
| 2015 | Canada | WC | 1st place, gold medalist(s) | 10 | 4 | 2 | 6 | 0 |
| Junior totals | | | | 16 | 9 | 11 | 20 | 8 |
| Senior totals | | | | 10 | 4 | 2 | 6 | 0 |

== Awards and honours ==
| Award | Year | Ref |
WHL
| Ed Chynoweth Cup champion | 2007 | |
| Brad Hornung Trophy | 2008, 2009 | |
| Player of the Week | February 2009 | |
| East First All-Star Team | 2008, 2009 | |
AHL
| Dudley "Red" Garrett Memorial Award | 2010 | |
NHL
| NHL All-Star Game | 2011 | |

Awards and achievements
| Preceded by Tyler Myers | Buffalo Sabres first-round draft pick 2008 | Succeeded by Zack Kassian |
| Preceded by Nathan Gerbe | AHL Rookie of the Year; 2009–10 | Succeeded by Luke Adam |
