= Derek Whitmore =

American ice hockey player

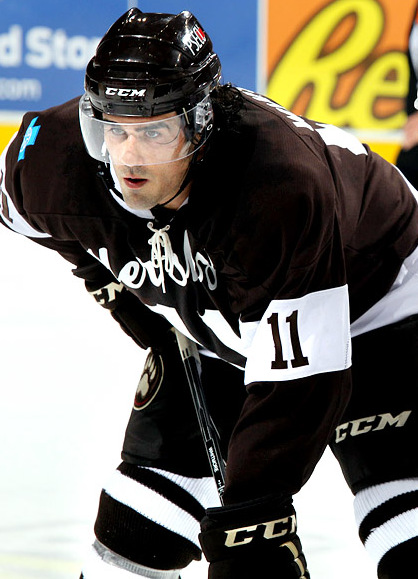
- Whitmore with the Hershey Bears in 2013
- Born: December 17, 1984 (age 41) Rochester, New York, U.S.
- Height: 5 ft 11 in (180 cm)
- Weight: 185 lb (84 kg; 13 st 3 lb)
- Position: Left wing
- Shot: Left
- ECHL team: free agent
- Played for: Buffalo Sabres; Augsburger Panther; Iserlohn Roosters; Vienna Capitals; Straubing Tigers; Maine Mariners
- NHL draft: Undrafted
- Playing career: 2008–2018, 2024
- Coaching career

Current position
- Title: Assistant coach
- Team: Chicago Steel

Biographical details
- Education: Bowling Green State

Coaching career (HC unless noted)
- 2018–2020: Bowdoin (women) (assistant)
- 2020–2021: Mercyhurst (assistant)
- 2021–2024: Chicago Steel (assistant)

Derek Robert Whitmore (born December 17, 1984) is an American professional ice hockey forward who is currently an unrestricted free agent. Whitmore recently played for the Maine Mariners in the ECHL.

== Playing career ==
After playing four seasons at Bowling Green State University, he signed a professional contract with the Sabres on March 26, 2008. On July 14, 2010 he re-signed with the Sabres for one year as a restricted free agent. On July 7, 2011, Whitmore was re-signed to a one-year contract by the Buffalo Sabres. He made his NHL debut with the team on December 20, 2011.

To begin the 2012-13 season, Whitmore signed a try-out contract with the St. John's IceCaps of the AHL, an affiliate, of the Winnipeg Jets. After 7 games, he was released from his agreement and left for Germany signing for the remainder of the campaign with Augsburger Panther of the DEL, on November 28, 2012. Whitmore scored 23 points in 26 games with the Panthers and was rewarded with a one-year contract extension.

On July 7, 2013, Whitmore used an out-clause in his newly signed contract with Augsburger to return to North America with NHL aspirations. He was signed to a one-year AHL contract with the Hershey Bears the following day. In the 2013–14 season, Whitmore was reassigned on loan from the Bears to the Adirondack Phantoms on March 12, 2014.

Whitmore opted to return to Germany in the off-season, signing a one-year contract as a free agent with the Iserlohn Roosters of the DEL on August 26, 2014. In the 2014–15 season with the Roosters, Whitmore although hampered at times through injury, contributed with 16 goals in 35 games.

On May 21, 2015, Whitmore left the Roosters as a free agent to join Austrian club, the Vienna Capitals of the EBEL on a one-year contract. In his one season in Austria, Whitmore appeared in 36 games with the Capitals, providing 19 points.

On July 27, 2016, Whitmore decided to return to Germany and the DEL, agreeing to a one-year deal with the Straubing Tigers.

After three seasons abroad, Whitmore returned to North America as a free agent before agreeing to an ECHL contract with the Reading Royals on August 24, 2017.

On December 30, 2024, Whitmore signed with the ECHL's Maine Mariners.

== Career statistics ==
| | | | Regular season | | | | | Playoffs |
| Season | Team | League | GP | G | A | Pts | PIM | GP | G | A | Pts | PIM |
|---|---|---|---|---|---|---|---|---|---|---|---|---|
| 2001–02 | Butte Irish | AWHL | 54 | 21 | 21 | 42 | 19 | — | — | — | — | — |
| 2002–03 | Waterloo Black Hawks | USHL | 58 | 15 | 13 | 28 | 51 | 6 | 1 | 0 | 1 | 0 |
| 2003–04 | Lincoln Stars | USHL | 45 | 19 | 23 | 42 | 22 | — | — | — | — | — |
| 2003–04 | Waterloo Black Hawks | USHL | 10 | 2 | 0 | 2 | 6 | — | — | — | — | — |
| 2004–05 | Bowling Green State University | CCHA | 33 | 11 | 6 | 17 | 14 | — | — | — | — | — |
| 2005–06 | Bowling Green State University | CCHA | 34 | 13 | 6 | 19 | 17 | — | — | — | — | — |
| 2006–07 | Bowling Green State University | CCHA | 38 | 19 | 10 | 29 | 20 | — | — | — | — | — |
| 2007–08 | Bowling Green State University | CCHA | 38 | 27 | 10 | 37 | 33 | — | — | — | — | — |
| 2007–08 | Rochester Americans | AHL | 8 | 1 | 0 | 1 | 2 | — | — | — | — | — |
| 2008–09 | Portland Pirates | AHL | 77 | 11 | 11 | 22 | 17 | 5 | 1 | 1 | 2 | 2 |
| 2009–10 | Portland Pirates | AHL | 78 | 18 | 16 | 34 | 24 | 4 | 3 | 1 | 2 | 0 |
| 2010–11 | Portland Pirates | AHL | 80 | 27 | 20 | 47 | 20 | 12 | 4 | 4 | 8 | 4 |
| 2011–12 | Rochester Americans | AHL | 75 | 28 | 16 | 44 | 25 | 3 | 0 | 0 | 0 | 0 |
| 2011–12 | Buffalo Sabres | NHL | 2 | 0 | 0 | 0 | 0 | — | — | — | — | — |
| 2012–13 | St. John's IceCaps | AHL | 7 | 1 | 3 | 4 | 2 | — | — | — | — | — |
| 2012–13 | Augsburger Panther | DEL | 26 | 9 | 14 | 23 | 40 | 2 | 1 | 0 | 1 | 0 |
| 2013–14 | Hershey Bears | AHL | 26 | 4 | 5 | 9 | 13 | — | — | — | — | — |
| 2013–14 | Adirondack Phantoms | AHL | 18 | 5 | 6 | 11 | 4 | — | — | — | — | — |
| 2014–15 | Iserlohn Roosters | DEL | 35 | 16 | 5 | 21 | 14 | 7 | 2 | 1 | 3 | 2 |
| 2015–16 | Vienna Capitals | EBEL | 36 | 10 | 9 | 19 | 10 | 6 | 3 | 0 | 3 | 0 |
| 2016–17 | Straubing Tigers | DEL | 37 | 6 | 9 | 15 | 4 | 2 | 0 | 0 | 0 | 0 |
| 2017–18 | Reading Royals | ECHL | 33 | 8 | 6 | 14 | 16 | — | — | — | — | — |
| AHL totals | | | 369 | 95 | 77 | 172 | 107 | 24 | 7 | 6 | 13 | 6 |
| NHL totals | | | 2 | 0 | 0 | 0 | 0 | — | — | — | — | — |

== Awards and honors ==
| Award | Year |
|---|---|
College
| All-CCHA Second team | 2007-08 |
