= Jason Pominville =

Canadian-American ice hockey player

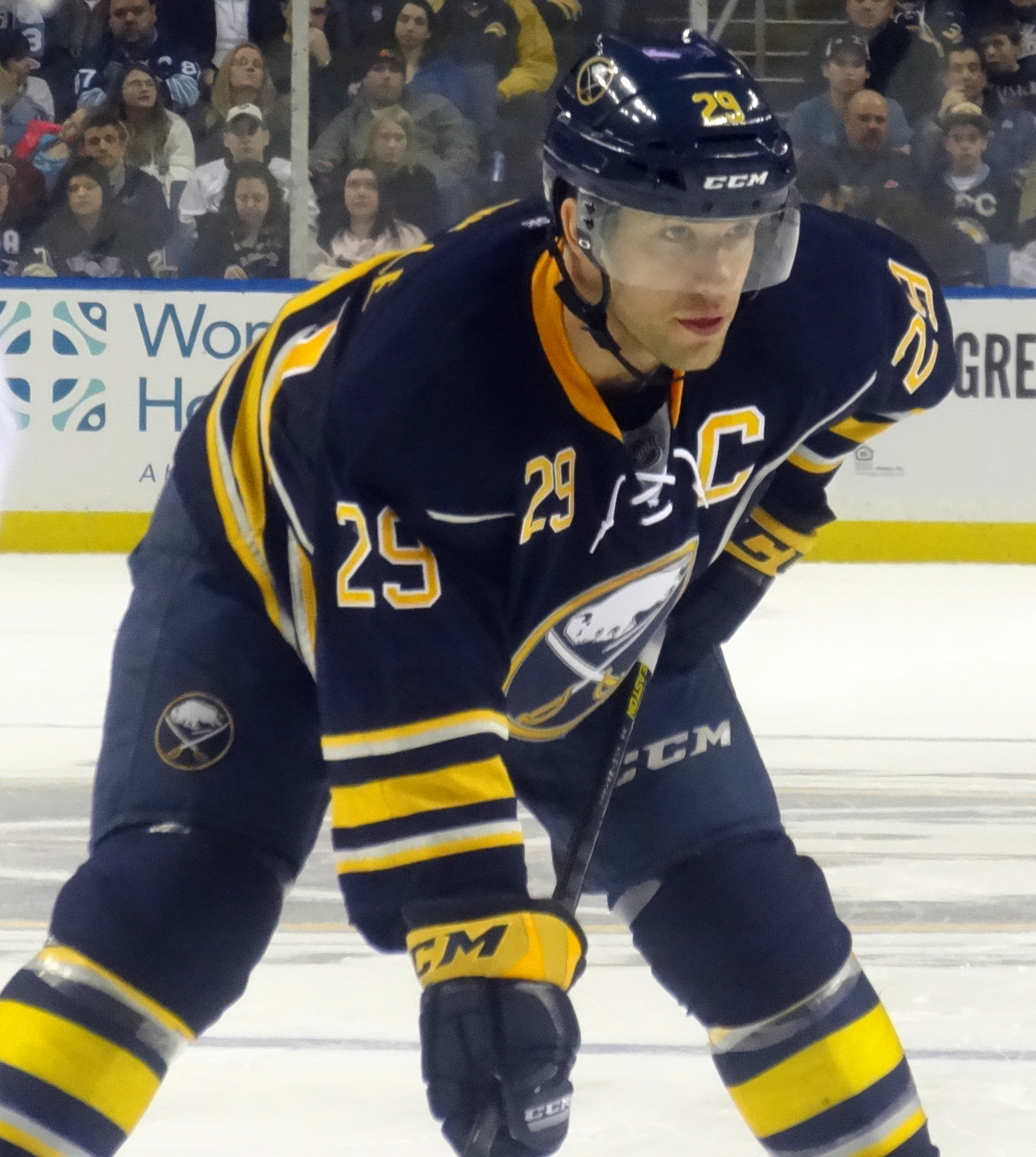
- Pominville with the Buffalo Sabres in 2013
- Born: November 30, 1982 (age 43) Repentigny, Quebec, Canada
- Height: 6 ft 0 in (183 cm)
- Weight: 181 lb (82 kg; 12 st 13 lb)
- Position: Right wing
- Shot: Right
- Played for: Buffalo Sabres; Minnesota Wild
- National team: United States
- NHL draft: 55th overall, 2001; Buffalo Sabres
- Playing career: 2002–2019

Jason John Pominville (born November 30, 1982) is a Canadian-American former professional ice hockey right winger. He played for the Buffalo Sabres and the Minnesota Wild of the National Hockey League (NHL).

== Playing career ==
=== Amateur ===
As a youth, Pominville played in the 1995 and 1996 Quebec International Pee-Wee Hockey Tournaments with minor ice hockey teams from Repentigny, Quebec and Rive-Nord.

Pominville played junior hockey for the Shawinigan Cataractes of the Quebec Major Junior Hockey League (QMJHL). In his fourth and final year with Shawinigan, 2001–02, he amassed 121 points in 66 games – seventh in league scoring – and was awarded the Frank J. Selke Memorial Trophy as the league's most gentlemanly player.

=== Professional ===
==== Buffalo Sabres (2003–2013) ====
Pominville was drafted 55th overall in the second round by the Buffalo Sabres in the 2001 NHL entry draft. He played for the Sabres' minor league affiliate, the Rochester Americans of the American Hockey League (AHL), until the 2005–06 season, when he earned a roster spot with Buffalo.

To begin the 2005–06 campaign, Pominville had initially been waived by the Sabres. Clearing waivers, he continued to play in the minors until he was called up a few months into the season. He scored his first NHL goal on November 27, 2005 – a powerplay goal against Olaf Kölzig in a 3–2 win against the Washington Capitals. Pominville quickly became an integral part of the Sabres line-up and finished the rest of the season with the Sabres with 18 goals in 57 games. In the 2006 playoffs, he recorded a hat-trick in Game 2 of the first round against the Philadelphia Flyers. Later in the Sabres' playoff run, he scored the series-clinching goal in the second round against the Ottawa Senators – a shorthanded effort in overtime of Game 5. It marked the first time in NHL history that a playoff series was decided by an overtime shorthanded goal. Buffalo announcer Rick Jeanneret marked this occasion with a call that is now famous in Buffalo hockey lore: "Oh, now do you believe? Now do you believe? These guys are good, scary good!" The Sabres had qualified as the fourth seed in the playoffs after failing to qualify the previous three seasons.

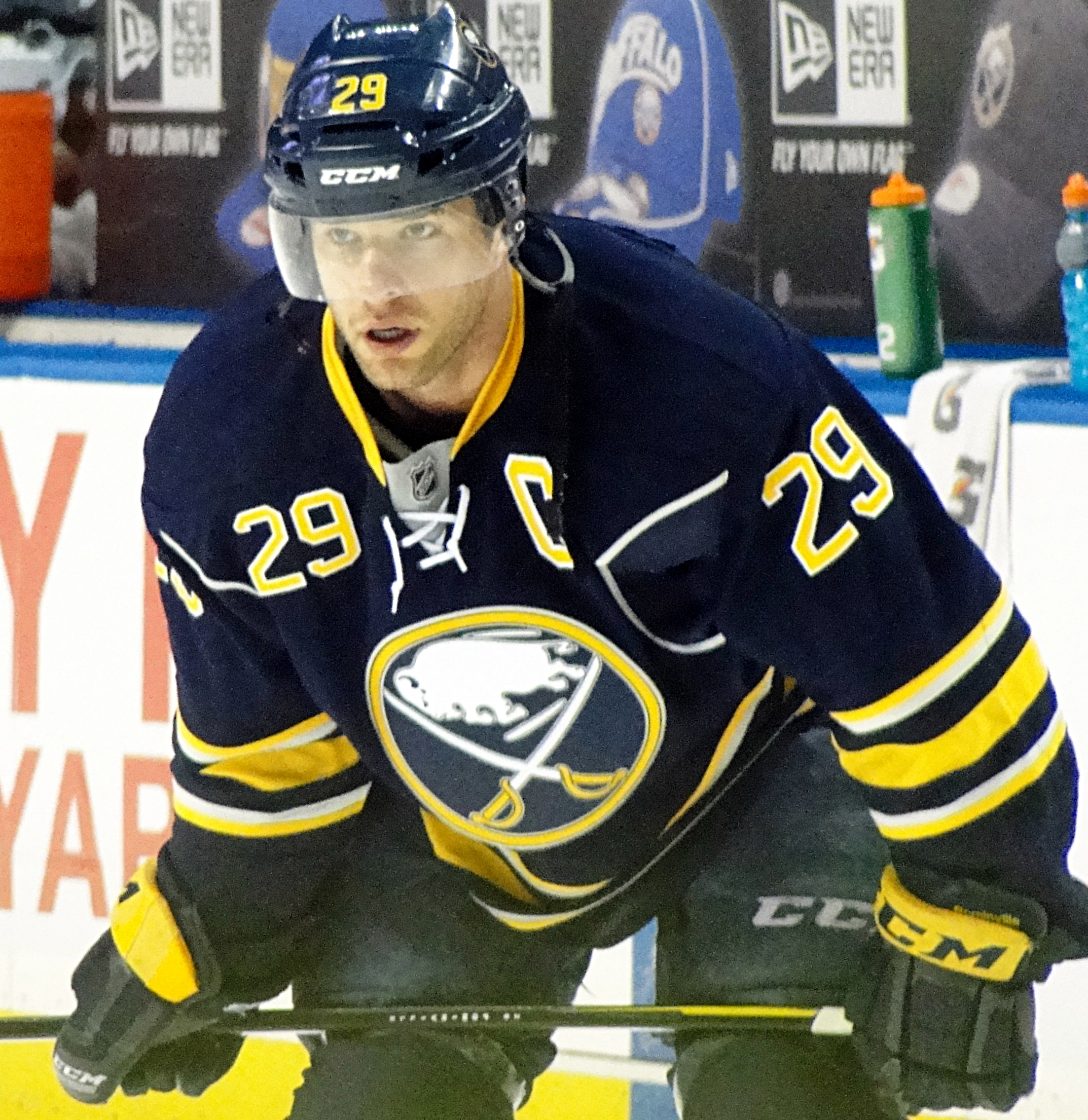
Pominville as the Sabres captain in February 2012. He had been named to the position the previous year on October 6, 2011.

After improving to 68 points the following season, Pominville made a name for himself in 2007–08. He scored at nearly a point-per-game with 80 points in 82 games. In the absence of departed co-captains Chris Drury and Daniel Brière from the previous season, the Sabres utilized a rotating captaincy during the 2007–08 season; Pominville was named captain for the months of March and April. At the end of the season, he was nominated for the Lady Byng Memorial Trophy as the league's most sportsmanlike player, along with Pavel Datsyuk and Martin St. Louis; the honour was awarded to Datsyuk.

On September 18, 2008, the Sabres acknowledged Pominville's rise to prominence and signed him to a five-year, $26.5 million contract extension (taking effect in 2009–10). His existing contract saw him make just over $1 million per season.

On October 13, 2010, his consecutive start streak of 335 games was broken because of the concussion he had received from Chicago Blackhawks defensemen Niklas Hjalmarsson (who was suspended two games for the illegal hit) in the previous game on October 11, 2010, when he was checked into the boards head first and then removed from the ice in a stretcher.

On October 6, 2011, in Helsinki, Finland, Pominville was named permanent Sabres captain. He became the 16th full-time captain in Sabres team history. While captain of the Sabres, he filmed a video for the You Can Play campaign, which aims to reduce homophobia in sport.

With the lockout postponing the beginning of the 2012–13 season, Pominville signed his first European contract on a temporary basis with German club Adler Mannheim of the Deutsche Eishockey Liga on November 30, 2012. Pominville produced 12 points in just seven games for the Eagles before returning to prepare for the Sabres' season opener.

==== Minnesota Wild (2013–2017) ====
With the Sabres enduring a largely unsuccessful season and with the intentions to revamp the roster, Pominville, along with a 2014 fourth-round pick, were traded to the Minnesota Wild in exchange for Johan Larsson, Matt Hackett, a 2013 first-round pick and 2014 second-round pick on April 3, 2013. With the Wild, Pominville recorded nine points in ten regular season games.

During the 2013–14 season, he scored 30 goals and 30 assists for 60 points to lead the Wild in scoring.

==== Return to Buffalo (2017–2019) ====
On June 30, 2017, Pominville returned to the Sabres in a trade that sent him, Marco Scandella and a 2018 fourth-round pick to Buffalo in exchange for Tyler Ennis, Marcus Foligno and a 2018 third-round pick.

On November 1, 2018, Pominville played in his 1,000 career NHL game. He recorded a goal in a 4–2 loss to the Ottawa Senators. The next game, following a pregame ceremony by the Sabres to commemorate his milestone, Pominville recorded two goals and an assist in a 9–2 win over the Senators.

The Sabres did not renew Pominville's contract during the 2019 off-season. He spent the year in Buffalo, playing in beer leagues. In a June 2020 interview, it was stated that Pominville's playing career had ended.

== Personal life ==
Pominville is a dual citizen of Canada and the United States. His father, Jean-Marie, is a native of Montreal and his mother, Deborah (Van Lanen) Pominville, is a native of Green Bay, Wisconsin.

== International play ==
Because Pominville has dual citizenship, he was eligible to play for either the United States or Canada in international tournaments, and opted to play for Team USA.

Making his international debut, he chose to represent the United States at the 2008 World Championships and scored five points in seven games.

== Career statistics ==
=== Regular season and playoffs ===
			Regular season					Playoffs
Season	Team	League	GP	G	A	Pts	PIM	GP	G	A	Pts	PIM
1998–99	Shawinigan Cataractes	QMJHL	2	0	0	0	0	—	—	—	—	—
1999–00	Shawinigan Cataractes	QMJHL	60	4	17	21	12	13	2	3	5	0
2000–01	Shawinigan Cataractes	QMJHL	71	46	67	113	24	10	6	6	12	0
2001–02	Shawinigan Cataractes	QMJHL	66	57	64	121	32	—	—	—	—	—
2002–03	Rochester Americans	AHL	73	13	21	34	16	3	1	1	2	0
2003–04	Rochester Americans	AHL	66	34	30	64	30	16	9	10	19	6
2003–04	Buffalo Sabres	NHL	1	0	0	0	0	—	—	—	—	—
2004–05	Rochester Americans	AHL	82	30	38	68	43	—	—	—	—	—
2005–06	Rochester Americans	AHL	18	19	7	26	11	—	—	—	—	—
2005–06	Buffalo Sabres	NHL	57	18	12	30	22	18	5	5	10	8
2006–07	Buffalo Sabres	NHL	82	34	34	68	30	16	4	6	10	0
2007–08	Buffalo Sabres	NHL	82	27	53	80	20	—	—	—	—	—
2008–09	Buffalo Sabres	NHL	82	20	46	66	18	—	—	—	—	—
2009–10	Buffalo Sabres	NHL	82	24	38	62	22	6	2	2	4	2
2010–11	Buffalo Sabres	NHL	73	22	30	52	15	5	1	3	4	2
2011–12	Buffalo Sabres	NHL	82	30	43	73	12	—	—	—	—	—
2012–13	Adler Mannheim	DEL	7	5	7	12	0	—	—	—	—	—
2012–13	Buffalo Sabres	NHL	37	10	15	25	8	—	—	—	—	—
2012–13	Minnesota Wild	NHL	10	4	5	9	0	2	0	0	0	0
2013–14	Minnesota Wild	NHL	82	30	30	60	16	13	2	7	9	0
2014–15	Minnesota Wild	NHL	82	18	36	54	8	10	3	3	6	0
2015–16	Minnesota Wild	NHL	75	11	25	36	12	6	4	3	7	6
2016–17	Minnesota Wild	NHL	78	13	34	47	4	5	0	1	1	0
2017–18	Buffalo Sabres	NHL	82	16	18	34	8	—	—	—	—	—
2018–19	Buffalo Sabres	NHL	73	16	15	31	4	—	—	—	—	—
NHL totals			1,060	293	434	727	199	81	21	30	52	18

=== International ===
Year	Team	Event	Result	GP	G	A	Pts	PIM
2008	United States	WC	6th	7	2	3	5	0
Senior totals				7	2	3	5	0

== Awards and honours ==
Award	Year
QMJHL
CHL Top Prospects Game	2001
QMJHL First All-Star Team	2002
CHL Third All-Star Team	2002
Frank J. Selke Memorial Trophy	2002
NHL
All-Star Game	2012

== See also ==
- List of NHL players with 1,000 games played

Sporting positions
Preceded by Jochen Hecht	Buffalo Sabres captain March and April 2008	Succeeded by Craig Rivet rotating captaincy ended
Preceded by Craig Rivet	Buffalo Sabres captain 2011–13	Succeeded by Steve Ott; Thomas Vanek
