= Marc-André Gragnani =

Canadian ice hockey player (born 1987)

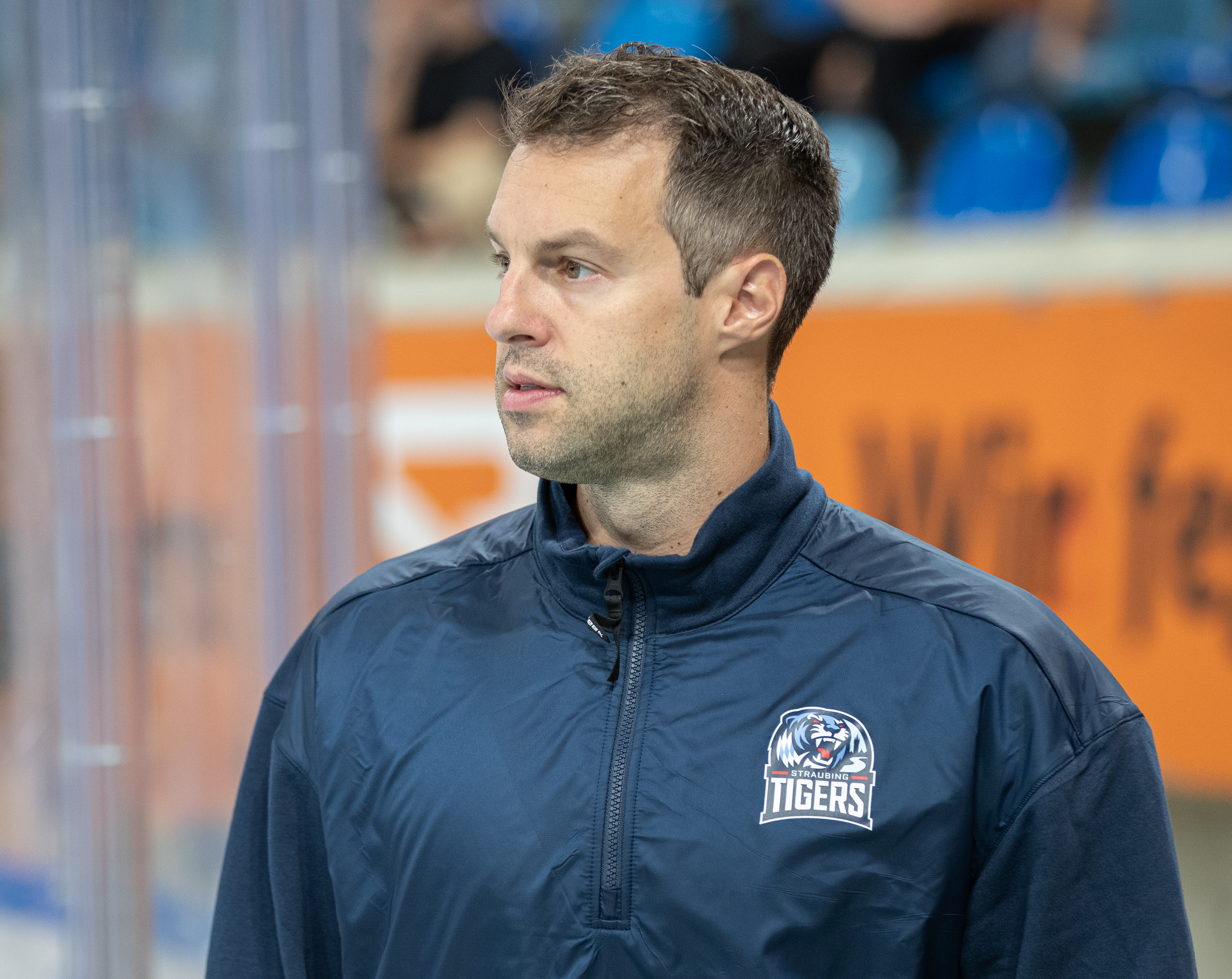
- Gragnani in 2025
- Born: March 11, 1987 (age 39) L'Île-Bizard, Quebec, Canada
- Height: 6 ft 3 in (191 cm)
- Weight: 205 lb (93 kg; 14 st 9 lb)
- Position: Defence
- Shot: Left
- Played for: Buffalo Sabres; Vancouver Canucks; Carolina Hurricanes; HC Lev Praha; SC Bern; New Jersey Devils; Dinamo Minsk; Kunlun Red Star; Djurgårdens IF
- National team: Canada
- NHL draft: 87th overall, 2005; Buffalo Sabres
- Playing career: 2007–2022

Marc-André Gragnani (born March 11, 1987) is a former Canadian professional ice hockey defenceman. He spent four-and-a-half seasons playing for the Buffalo Sabres of the National Hockey League and their American Hockey League affiliate, the Portland Pirates. He also played half a season with Vancouver before signing with the Carolina Hurricanes as a free agent. On July 3, 2015, Gragnani signed a one-year, two-way contract with the New Jersey Devils for whom he appeared four times.

== Playing career ==
He played minor hockey for the Dauphins de Deux-Rives followed by four years in the Quebec Major Junior Hockey League (QMJHL). He was selected 87th overall by the Buffalo Sabres in the 2005 NHL entry draft and signed a professional contract with the Sabres in June 2007. After completing his junior career with the PEI Rocket, Gragnani began his professional career within the Sabres organization in the 2007–08 season, making his debut on February 23, 2008. Although originally drafted as a defenceman, Gragnani shifted to the left wing position during his first season. In April 2009, he established a new record for Portland defencemen with 51 points in the regular season. He also set the Portland franchise record for assists by a defenceman in a single season with 42. In 2011, he broke both of his own records by registering 48 assists and 60 points in a single season.

Gragnani was called up to the parent Buffalo Sabres in March 2011. His first NHL goal was a game-winning overtime goal in a game against the Carolina Hurricanes on April 3, 2011. Gragnani signed a two-year contract extension with the Sabres in the 2011 offseason.

After making the Sabres lineup for the first time out of training camp and earning a regular roster spot to begin the 2011–12 season, he was made a consistent healthy scratch by February 2012. At the NHL trade deadline, on February 27, he was traded along with forward Zack Kassian to the Vancouver Canucks in exchange for forward Cody Hodgson and defenceman Alexander Sulzer. By that point in the season, Gragnani had played only once in the Sabres' previous month of games. Joining Vancouver, he was made a healthy scratch for the team's first game following the trade before making his Canucks debut on March 1, a 2–0 win against the St. Louis Blues. He finished the year playing in 14 games for Vancouver and did not appear in the playoffs.

By the end of the season, Gragnani had not played in enough games to earn unrestricted free agent status, remaining a restricted free agent if he was tendered a qualifying offer. With no intention of re-singing Gragnani, the Canucks unsuccessfully attempted to trade him at the 2012 NHL entry draft. Unable to move Gragnani, Vancouver chose not to give him a qualifying offer. As an unrestricted free agent Gragnani signed a one-year two-way contract with the Carolina Hurricanes.

On May 22, 2013, he signed a two-year contract in the Kontinental Hockey League with HC Lev Praha of the Czech Republic. In the 2013–14 season, Gragnani scored just 9 points in 42 games, but helped the club reach the Gagarin Cup finals in the post-season.

With the bankruptcy of Lev Praha leading to the club folding, Gragnani settled the remaining year of his contract to become a free agent. On July 10, 2014, Gragnani moved to the Swiss National League A, signing a one-year deal with SC Bern.

On July 3, 2015, after two seasons abroad, Gragnani returned to the NHL in signing as a free agent to a one-year, two-way contract with the New Jersey Devils. In the 2015–16 season, Gragnani was assigned for the majority of the year to AHL affiliate, the Albany Devils. He was recalled to the Devils to appear in four games.

As a free agent in the off-season, Gragnani opted to return to Europe, signing a one-year deal with Belarusian club, HC Dinamo Minsk of the KHL on August 1, 2016. After two seasons with Minsk, Gragnani left the team however opted to continue in the KHL for the 2018–19 season, signing a one-year contract with Chinese outfit, HC Kunlun Red Star, on August 13, 2018.

On August 2, 2019, Gragnani continued his career in the KHL, returning for a second stint with HC Dinamo Minsk on a one-year contract.

== International play ==
Medal record

Representing Canada

Ice hockey

Olympic Games
Bronze medal – third place	2018 Pyeongchang	

IIHF U18 Championships
Silver medal – second place	2005 České Budějovice	

During the 2017–18 season, Gragnani was selected to represent Canada at the 2018 Winter Olympics in Pyeongchang, South Korea. Used in an offensive roving role, Gragnani contributed with 3 assists in 6 games to help Canada claim the bronze medal.

== Career statistics ==
=== Regular season and playoffs ===
			Regular season					Playoffs
Season	Team	League	GP	G	A	Pts	PIM	GP	G	A	Pts	PIM
2002–03	West Island Lions	QMAAA	34	3	15	18	22	—	—	—	—	—
2003–04	P.E.I. Rocket	QMJHL	61	2	13	15	42	11	0	0	0	4
2004–05	P.E.I. Rocket	QMJHL	68	10	29	39	48	—	—	—	—	—
2005–06	P.E.I. Rocket	QMJHL	62	16	55	71	75	6	1	4	5	14
2006–07	P.E.I. Rocket	QMJHL	65	22	46	68	58	7	5	8	13	4
2007–08	Rochester Americans	AHL	78	14	38	52	38	—	—	—	—	—
2007–08	Buffalo Sabres	NHL	2	0	0	0	4	—	—	—	—	—
2008–09	Portland Pirates	AHL	76	9	42	51	59	5	0	2	2	4
2008–09	Buffalo Sabres	NHL	4	0	0	0	2	—	—	—	—	—
2009–10	Portland Pirates	AHL	66	12	31	43	37	4	0	2	2	0
2010–11	Portland Pirates	AHL	63	12	48	60	51	—	—	—	—	—
2010–11	Buffalo Sabres	NHL	9	1	2	3	2	7	1	6	7	4
2011–12	Buffalo Sabres	NHL	44	1	11	12	20	—	—	—	—	—
2011–12	Vancouver Canucks	NHL	14	1	2	3	6	—	—	—	—	—
2012–13	Charlotte Checkers	AHL	42	3	25	28	29	—	—	—	—	—
2012–13	Carolina Hurricanes	NHL	1	0	0	0	0	—	—	—	—	—
2013–14	HC Lev Praha	KHL	42	2	7	9	43	22	0	4	4	0
2014–15	SC Bern	NLA	49	8	29	37	18	11	1	4	5	0
2015–16	Albany Devils	AHL	57	1	30	31	16	11	0	3	3	16
2015–16	New Jersey Devils	NHL	4	0	0	0	2	—	—	—	—	—
2016–17	Dinamo Minsk	KHL	56	4	33	37	38	5	0	1	1	2
2017–18	Dinamo Minsk	KHL	55	6	29	35	54	—	—	—	—	—
2018–19	Kunlun Red Star	KHL	23	2	11	13	14	—	—	—	—	—
2019–20	Dinamo Minsk	KHL	47	8	17	25	20	—	—	—	—	—
2020–21	Djurgårdens IF	SHL	5	2	3	5	0	1	0	0	0	0
2021–22	Djurgårdens IF	SHL	32	4	10	14	6	—	—	—	—	—
NHL totals			78	3	15	18	36	7	1	6	7	4
KHL totals			223	22	97	119	169	27	0	5	5	2

=== International ===
Year	Team	Event	Result	GP	G	A	Pts	PIM
2005	Canada	WJC18	2nd place, silver medalist(s)	6	0	3	3	0
2011	Canada	WC	5th	6	1	1	2	2
2018	Canada	OG	3rd place, bronze medalist(s)	6	0	3	3	2
Junior totals				6	0	3	3	0
Senior totals				12	1	4	5	4

== Awards and honours ==
Award	Year
AHL
First All-Star Team	2011
Eddie Shore Award	2011
KHL
All-Star Game	2018
