= Cody McCormick =

Canadian ice hockey player (born 1983)

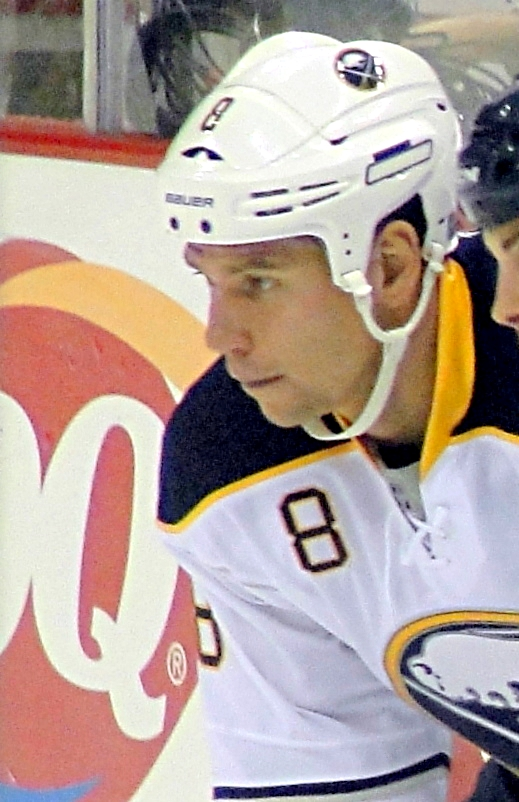
- McCormick with the Buffalo Sabres in 2011
- Born: April 18, 1983 (age 43) London, Ontario, Canada
- Height: 6 ft 2 in (188 cm)
- Weight: 224 lb (102 kg; 16 st 0 lb)
- Position: Center/Right wing
- Shot: Right
- Played for: Colorado Avalanche; Buffalo Sabres; Minnesota Wild
- NHL draft: 144th overall, 2001; Colorado Avalanche
- Playing career: 2003–2015

Cody McCormick (born April 18, 1983) is a Canadian former ice hockey player and coach. He is of European and First Nations descent, with both Oneida and Chippewa/Ojibway ancestors. Cody McCormick is from London, Ontario Canada and has played for Colorado Avalanche, Buffalo Sabres, and Minnesota Wild. He was also the head coach of the Buffalo Beauts of the National Women's Hockey League from December 2018 to May 2019.

== Playing career ==
=== Ontario Hockey League ===
McCormick was selected 37th overall by the Belleville Bulls junior hockey team, of the OHL. He played as a left winger for the Belleville, Ontario based team for all four years of his junior career, from 1990-2000 to 2002-2003. During McCormick's four-year stint as a Bull, he accumulated a total of 56 goals, where 36 of them came from his 2002-2003 season.

=== National Hockey League ===
McCormick was drafted 144th overall by the Colorado Avalanche in the 2001 NHL entry draft from the Belleville Bulls of the OHL. In his last junior year 2002–03, and as Captain, McCormick had a breakout year offensively with the Bulls, posting 36 goals and 69 points in 61 games. He was selected to the OHL First All-Star Team and named the Best Checker in the OHL.

McCormick turned professional in 2003–04 and made his NHL debut with the Avalanche and split the year between the Avs and AHL affiliate the Hershey Bears. McCormick spent the next four seasons between the Avalanche and the AHL before he found a full-time role with Colorado in 2008–09 playing in an NHL high 55 games and contributing 12 points.

On August 1, 2009, McCormick signed a one-year contract with the Buffalo Sabres. He was then assigned to AHL affiliate, the Portland Pirates for the 2009–10 season, posting professional career highs with 17 goals and 29 points in 66 games. During the playoffs with the Pirates McCormick was recalled to Buffalo as an injury replacement for additional toughness. On April 21, 2010, McCormick made his debut with the Sabres in Game 4 of the first round of the Eastern Conference playoffs against the Boston Bruins recording an assist on a goal by Tim Kennedy.

Contributing with 2 assists in his brief showing with Buffalo, he was then re-signed to a one-year, one-way contract with the Sabres on July 2, 2010. During his time with the Sabres Cody McCormick garnered the most penalty minutes at 142 minutes total. playing primarily on the fourth line with Patrick Kaleta.

During the shortened 2012–13 season, his fourth with the Sabres organization, McCormick was placed on waivers on February 20, 2013. With appearing in only 8 scoreless games he passed through unclaimed the following day and was immediately reassigned to AHL affiliate, the Rochester Americans.

After returning from a lengthy injury with the Sabres during the 2013–14 season, McCormick was included in a trade by Buffalo along with Matt Moulson to the Minnesota Wild in exchange for Torrey Mitchell and draft picks on March 5, 2014.

At the conclusion of the season, McCormick ended his brief stint with the Wild to return to the Sabres as a free agent on a three-year contract on July 1, 2014. In January 2015, McCormick experienced blood clots that prevented him from playing the rest of the season and the entire 2015–16 campaign. Similar to Pascal Dupuis, despite efforts to medicate and become healthier the complications of the blood clots spreading to McCormick's lungs lead to him retiring at 32 years of age.

== Personal life ==
McCormick is married with two daughters and resides in Buffalo, New York during the off-season. His wife is Alyssa Paiement, the daughter of former NHLer Wilf Paiement. McCormick is from Chippewa of the Thames First Nation, located in Southwestern Ontario, near London, Ontario. The Thames First Nations can also be referred to as Anishinaabeg, meaning the original people. They are from the territory of Deshkaan Ziibing. McCormick's ancestors originally arrived from north-eastern region of North America, where they then settled in the area of the Great Lakes.

== Career statistics ==
			Regular season					Playoffs
Season	Team	League	GP	G	A	Pts	PIM	GP	G	A	Pts	PIM
1999–2000	Belleville Bulls	OHL	45	3	4	7	42	9	0	1	1	10
2000–01	Belleville Bulls	OHL	66	7	16	23	135	10	1	1	2	23
2001–02	Belleville Bulls	OHL	63	10	17	27	118	11	2	4	6	24
2002–03	Belleville Bulls	OHL	61	36	33	69	166	7	4	7	11	11
2003–04	Colorado Avalanche	NHL	44	2	3	5	73	—	—	—	—	—
2003–04	Hershey Bears	AHL	32	3	6	9	60	—	—	—	—	—
2004–05	Hershey Bears	AHL	40	5	6	11	68	—	—	—	—	—
2005–06	Colorado Avalanche	NHL	45	4	4	8	29	—	—	—	—	—
2005–06	Lowell Lock Monsters	AHL	13	1	6	7	34	—	—	—	—	—
2006–07	Colorado Avalanche	NHL	6	0	1	1	6	—	—	—	—	—
2006–07	Albany River Rats	AHL	42	8	8	16	64	5	1	0	1	4
2007–08	Colorado Avalanche	NHL	40	2	2	4	50	4	0	1	1	7
2007–08	Lake Erie Monsters	AHL	13	2	4	6	16	—	—	—	—	—
2008–09	Colorado Avalanche	NHL	55	1	11	12	92	—	—	—	—	—
2009–10	Portland Pirates	AHL	66	17	12	29	168	3	0	0	0	9
2009–10	Buffalo Sabres	NHL	—	—	—	—	—	3	0	2	2	14
2010–11	Buffalo Sabres	NHL	81	8	12	20	142	7	1	0	1	2
2011–12	Buffalo Sabres	NHL	50	1	3	4	56	—	—	—	—	—
2012–13	Buffalo Sabres	NHL	8	0	0	0	10	—	—	—	—	—
2012–13	Rochester Americans	AHL	25	6	5	11	42	3	1	0	1	26
2013–14	Buffalo Sabres	NHL	29	1	4	5	45	—	—	—	—	—
2013–14	Minnesota Wild	NHL	14	1	1	2	7	13	1	0	1	14
2014–15	Buffalo Sabres	NHL	33	1	3	4	40	—	—	—	—	—
NHL totals			405	21	44	65	550	27	2	3	5	37

== Awards and honours ==
Award	Year
OHL
First All-Star Team	2003
