= Patrick Kaleta =

American ice hockey player (born 1986)

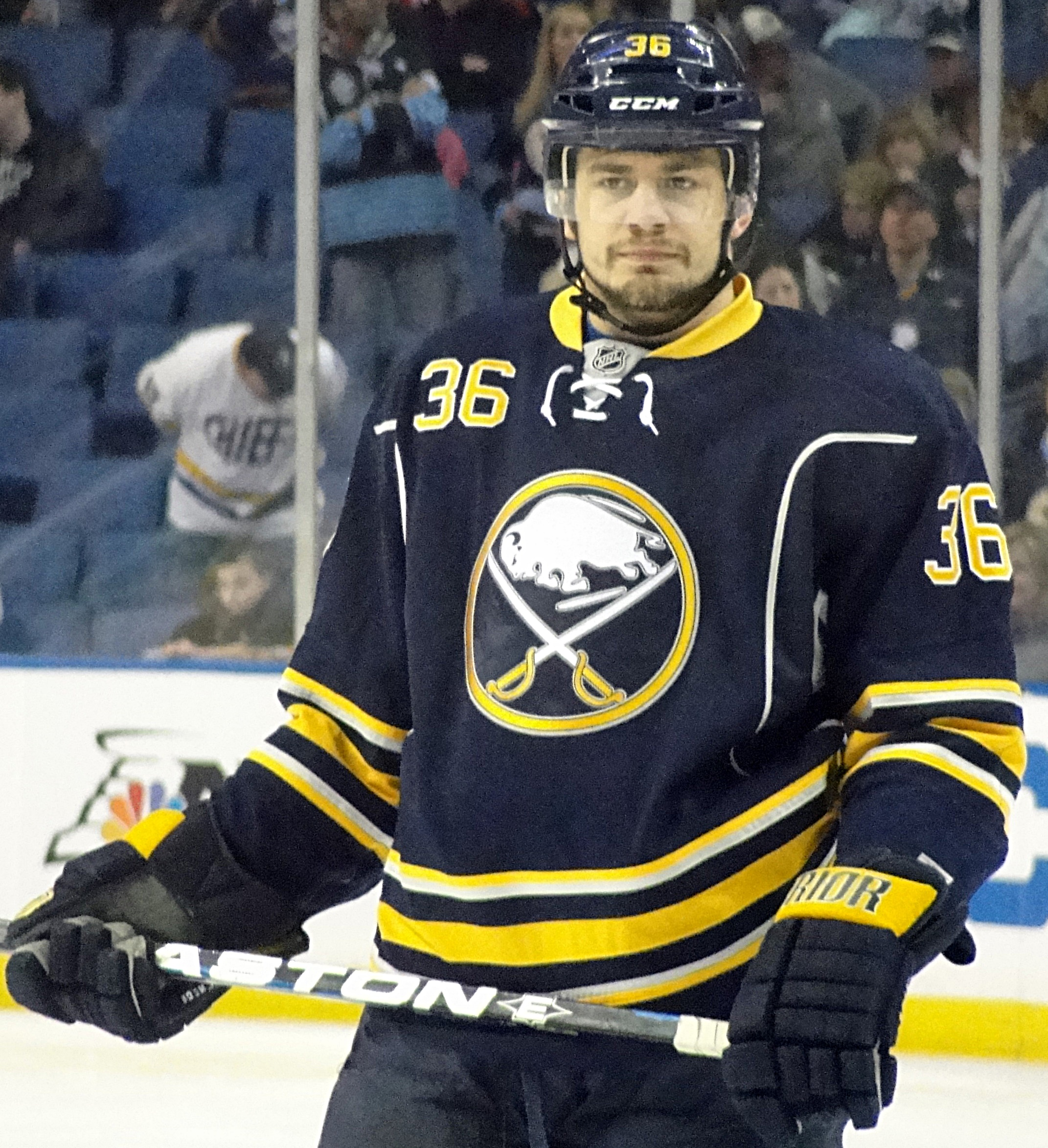
- Kaleta with the Buffalo Sabres in 2012
- Born: June 8, 1986 (age 40) Angola, New York, U.S.
- Height: 6 ft 1 in (185 cm)
- Weight: 206 lb (93 kg; 14 st 10 lb)
- Position: Right wing
- Shot: Right
- Played for: Buffalo Sabres
- NHL draft: 176th overall, 2004; Buffalo Sabres
- Playing career: 2006–2016

Patrick Kaleta (born June 8, 1986) is an American former professional ice hockey right winger who played in the National Hockey League (NHL) for the Buffalo Sabres from 2006 until 2015. He was drafted by the Sabres in the sixth round, 176th overall, of the 2004 NHL entry draft. Kaleta is just the third native of the Buffalo Niagara Region to play for the hometown Sabres in the regular season. (Although Marcus Foligno was born in Buffalo, he spent most of his childhood in his father's hometown of Sudbury, Ontario.) Kaleta retains the highest career rate of drawing penalties since the NHL began collecting this data in the 2007-08 season.

== Playing career ==
=== Junior ===
Kaleta grew up in the Buffalo suburb of Angola and played most of his minor hockey with Hamburg Hawks and the West Seneca Wings, also playing high school hockey for St. Francis HS in Athol Springs. It was there he was discovered by the Peterborough Petes of the Ontario Hockey League (OHL), who selected him in the second round, 31st overall, in the 2002 OHL Priority Draft. He spent his major junior ice hockey career with Peterborough, where he compiled 147 points and 460 penalty minutes over four seasons. In the 2006 OHL playoffs, Kaleta scored eight goals and ten assists as the Petes reached the 2006 Memorial Cup. Kaleta signed his first professional contract in June 2006 with the Buffalo Sabres, the organization that drafted him two years prior in 2004, 176th overall.

=== Professional ===
On February 21, 2007, partway through his first professional season, Kaleta was called up from the American Hockey League (AHL)'s Rochester Americans by his parent club in Buffalo. In his first NHL game on February 22, 2007, against the Ottawa Senators, Kaleta earned his first NHL point, an assist on a goal by Clarke MacArthur, and his first NHL fight against Ottawa's Chris Phillips. The game is best known as a brawl broke out which included Sabres head coach Lindy Ruff and Bryan Murray fighting from the benches. Kaleta scored his first career NHL goal on February 10, 2008, against the Florida Panthers.

Kaleta recorded his first two-goal game on December 12, 2009, against the New York Rangers, a 3–2 Buffalo victory. He scored the game-winner on a short-handed breakaway, beating Rangers goaltender Henrik Lundqvist high on the glove side.

Kaleta has earned a reputation as a hard hitter, usually playing on the Sabres' fourth line along with the team's enforcers (Andrew Peters and Adam Mair during their time in Buffalo, and later Cody McCormick and John Scott). Kaleta described his style as such: "I try to play a clean, hard-nosed game. A lot of people don't like that."

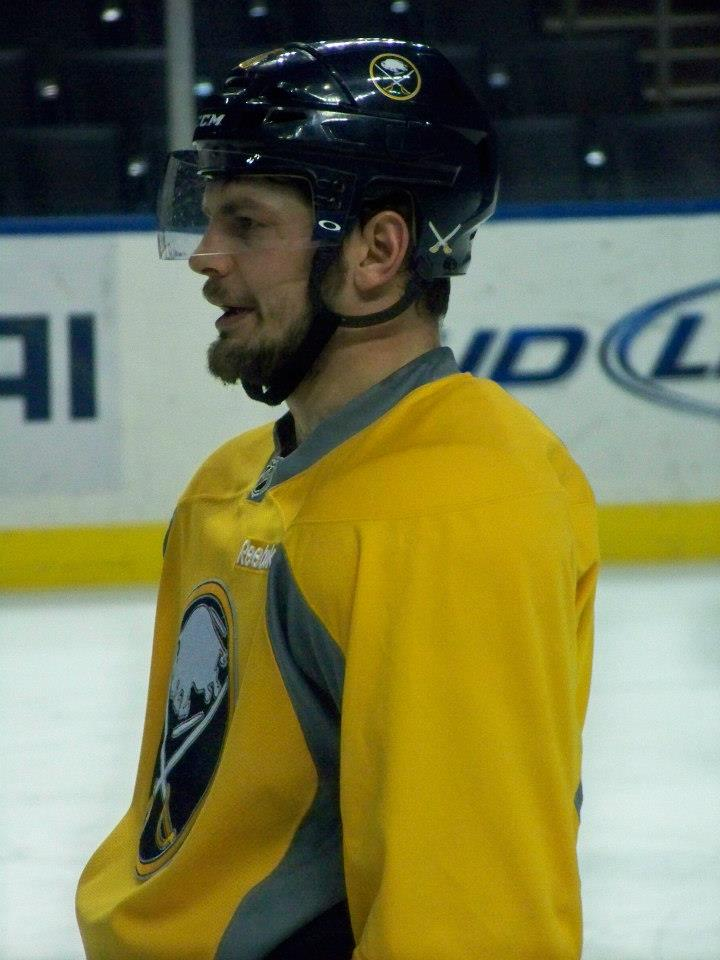
Patrick Kaleta with the Sabres in 2013

Kaleta was suspended four times by the NHL, including for an illegal check to the head on Jack Johnson during the 2013-14 season. Following his fourth suspension, he was placed on waivers and returned to the Rochester Americans.

Shortly after his arrival in Rochester, Kaleta injured his anterior cruciate ligament (ACL), ending his season. By March 2014, the point at which Kaleta's injury had healed enough to begin skating again (and by which point Regier had been dismissed), Sabres head coach Ted Nolan brought Kaleta back to the Sabres practices and gave him a locker in the Sabres' locker room.

Kaleta was slated to return to the Sabres for the 2014–15 season, but sustained numerous broken bones in his face and possible concussion after getting hit with a puck during a pre-season contest on September 28, 2014. After the Sabres changed management in the 2015 off-season, the team did not extend Kaleta's contract, despite Kaleta's desire to return. He eventually agreed to a one-year deal with the team's AHL affiliate, the Americans, and a $500 professional tryout offer for the Sabres' pre-season. Kaleta was named the Rochester Americans 2015–16 Man of the Year, in recognition of his contributions to the community and local charities.

Upon the expiration of his contract, Kaleta changed agents and expressed a desire to pursue free agency, but would retire if he did not sign with an NHL team. On November 17, 2016, Kaleta opted to remain within the Sabres organization, accepting a position as a youth hockey ambassador. Kaleta currently coaches the Buffalo Jr. Sabres 13U team.

=== Suspensions ===
During the 2009–10 NHL season, Kaleta was suspended for two games for boarding Jared Ross of the Philadelphia Flyers. Early in the 2011–12 season, on November 3, 2011, Kaleta was suspended for four regular season games for a head-butt on Philadelphia Flyers forward Jakub Voráček. This marked the third time in less than two seasons that Kaleta was caught head-butting. On March 3, 2013, Kaleta hit New York Rangers forward Brad Richards into the boards from behind. Kaleta was assessed a five-minute boarding major and a game misconduct. Due to repeat offenses, Kaleta was handed a five-game suspension from the League the next day. On October 13, 2013, Kaleta made an illegal check to the head on Columbus Blue Jackets defenseman Jack Johnson. Kaleta was not penalized on the play, but was later given a ten-game suspension by the NHL Department of Player Safety. On November 2, 2013, after failing to find a trading partner and the end of the suspension, the Sabres placed Kaleta on waivers. General manager Darcy Regier implied the NHL had pressured the Sabres to expel Kaleta from the league. Kaleta cleared waivers and was assigned to the Rochester Americans, where he was to remain until, as Regier put it, he made "significant changes to his playing style".

== Career statistics ==
			Regular season					Playoffs
Season	Team	League	GP	G	A	Pts	PIM	GP	G	A	Pts	PIM
2002–03	Peterborough Petes	OHL	67	7	9	16	67	7	0	0	0	6
2003–04	Peterborough Petes	OHL	67	14	14	28	126	—	—	—	—	—
2004–05	Peterborough Petes	OHL	62	24	28	52	146	14	3	3	6	30
2005–06	Peterborough Petes	OHL	68	16	35	51	121	19	8	10	18	43
2006–07	Rochester Americans	AHL	58	5	10	15	133	5	0	0	0	12
2006–07	Buffalo Sabres	NHL	7	0	2	2	21	—	—	—	—	—
2007–08	Rochester Americans	AHL	29	1	3	4	109	—	—	—	—	—
2007–08	Buffalo Sabres	NHL	40	3	2	5	41	—	—	—	—	—
2008–09	Buffalo Sabres	NHL	51	4	5	9	89	—	—	—	—	—
2009–10	Buffalo Sabres	NHL	55	10	5	15	89	6	1	1	2	22
2010–11	Buffalo Sabres	NHL	51	4	5	9	78	6	1	2	3	6
2011–12	Buffalo Sabres	NHL	63	5	5	10	116	—	—	—	—	—
2012–13	Buffalo Sabres	NHL	34	1	0	1	67	—	—	—	—	—
2013–14	Buffalo Sabres	NHL	5	0	0	0	5	—	—	—	—	—
2013–14	Rochester Americans	AHL	7	1	3	4	2	—	—	—	—	—
2014–15	Buffalo Sabres	NHL	42	0	3	3	36	—	—	—	—	—
2015–16	Rochester Americans	AHL	26	1	2	3	33	—	—	—	—	—
NHL totals			348	27	27	54	542	12	2	3	5	28

== Penalty Drawing ==
			Regular season
Season	Team	League	GP	Drawn	Taken	TOI (Min)	Pen Diff/60 min
2007–08	Buffalo Sabres	NHL	40	27	11	250	3.83
2008–09	Buffalo Sabres	NHL	51	54	29	455	3.30
2009–10	Buffalo Sabres	NHL	55	53	29	558	2.58
2010–11	Buffalo Sabres	NHL	51	30	24	520	0.69
2011–12	Buffalo Sabres	NHL	63	36	36	829	0.00
2012–13	Buffalo Sabres	NHL	34	35	18	367	2.78
2013–14	Buffalo Sabres	NHL	5	1	1	42	0.00
2014–15	Buffalo Sabres	NHL	42	17	11	372	0.97
NHL totals			341	253	159	3393	1.66
