= 2010–11 New York Islanders season =

NHL hockey team season

2010–11 New York Islanders
- Division: 5th Atlantic
- Conference: 14th Eastern
- 2010–11 record: 30–39–13
- Home record: 17–18–6
- Road record: 13–21–7
- Goals for: 229
- Goals against: 264

Team information
- General manager: Garth Snow
- Coach: Scott Gordon (Oct.–Nov.); Jack Capuano (interim, Nov.–Apr.)
- Captain: Doug Weight
- Alternate captains: Kyle Okposo; Mark Streit
- Arena: Nassau Veterans Memorial Coliseum
- Average attendance: 11,059 (68.1%)

Team leaders
- Goals: Michael Grabner (34)
- Assists: John Tavares (38)
- Points: John Tavares (67)
- Penalty minutes: Zenon Konopka (307)
- Plus/minus: Frans Nielsen; Grabner (+13)
- Wins: Al Montoya (9)
- Goals against average: Al Montoya (2.39)

The 2010–11 New York Islanders season was the 39th season in franchise history.

The Islanders posted a regular season record of 30 wins, 39 losses and 13 overtime/shootout losses for 73 points, failing to qualify for the Stanley Cup playoffs for the fourth consecutive season.

== Off-season ==
The Islanders selected forward Nino Niederreiter with the fifth overall pick in the 2010 NHL entry draft. Niederreiter became the highest-drafted Swiss-born player in NHL history.

Throughout the off-season, the Islanders added defensemen Milan Jurcina, Mark Eaton and Mike Mottau, as well as forwards Zenon Konopka and P. A. Parenteau via free agency.

In a July 30, 2010, trade with the Anaheim Ducks, the Islanders acquired defenseman James Wisniewski in exchange for a conditional third-round draft pick in 2011.

Most notably, the Islanders lost forward Kyle Okposo and defenseman Mark Streit to two accidental and separate shoulder injuries during training camp, both requiring surgeries. These injuries effectively removed two top-line players for the Islanders, as they were expected to remain out for three and six months, respectively.

Meanwhile, arena issues continued to follow the franchise, as team owner Charles Wang's proposed Lighthouse Project was met with continued obstacles from local authorities. Both sides remain at odds, and little progress has been made since.

== Regular season ==
After a ten-game losing streak, the Islanders changed coaches on November 15, 2010, moving Scott Gordon into an adviser to the general manager position and naming the Bridgeport Sound Tigers' head coach, Jack Capuano, as their interim head coach. The Islanders ended a near franchise-tying record of 15-straight games without a win on November 26, 2010, against the New Jersey Devils. The Islanders won 2–0 with Rick DiPietro securing the shutout. The Islanders ended the season with the worst average attendance in the NHL with an average of 11,059 (68.1% arena capacity).

The Islanders finished the regular season having scored the most shorthanded goals, with 15.

== Playoffs ==
On March 26, 2011, the Islanders were mathematically eliminated when the Buffalo Sabres defeated the New Jersey Devils. The Islanders last made the playoffs in the 2006–07 season.

== Standings ==
=== Divisional standings ===
Atlantic Division
		GP	W	L	OTL	ROW	GF	GA	Pts
**1**	**Philadelphia Flyers**	**82**	**47**	**23**	**12**	**44**	**259**	**223**	**106**
**2**	**Pittsburgh Penguins**	**82**	**49**	**25**	**8**	**39**	**238**	**199**	**106**
**3**	**New York Rangers**	**82**	**44**	**33**	**5**	**35**	**233**	**198**	**93**
4	New Jersey Devils	82	38	39	5	35	174	209	81
5	New York Islanders	82	30	39	13	26	229	264	73

=== Conference standings ===
Eastern Conference
R		Div	GP	W	L	OTL	ROW	GF	GA	Pts
**1**	**z – Washington Capitals**	**SE**	**82**	**48**	**23**	**11**	**43**	**224**	**197**	107
**2**	**y – Philadelphia Flyers**	**AT**	**82**	**47**	**23**	**12**	**44**	**259**	**223**	106
**3**	**y – Boston Bruins**	**NE**	**82**	**46**	**25**	**11**	**44**	**246**	**195**	103
**4**	**Pittsburgh Penguins**	**AT**	**82**	**49**	**25**	**8**	**39**	**238**	**199**	106
**5**	**Tampa Bay Lightning**	**SE**	**82**	**46**	**25**	**11**	**40**	**247**	**240**	103
**6**	**Montreal Canadiens**	**NE**	**82**	**44**	**30**	**8**	**41**	**216**	**209**	96
**7**	**Buffalo Sabres**	**NE**	**82**	**43**	**29**	**10**	**38**	**245**	**229**	96
**8**	**New York Rangers**	**AT**	**82**	**44**	**33**	**5**	**35**	**233**	**198**	93
8.5
9	Carolina Hurricanes	SE	82	40	31	11	35	236	239	91
10	Toronto Maple Leafs	NE	82	37	34	11	32	218	251	85
11	New Jersey Devils	AT	82	38	39	5	35	174	209	81
12	Atlanta Thrashers	SE	82	34	36	12	29	223	269	80
13	Ottawa Senators	NE	82	32	40	10	30	192	250	74
14	New York Islanders	AT	82	30	39	13	26	229	264	73
15	Florida Panthers	SE	82	30	40	12	26	195	229	72

bold – qualified for playoffs; y – Won division; z – Placed first in conference (and division)
AT – Atlantic Division, NE – Northeast Division, SE – Southeast Division

== Schedule and results ==
=== Pre-season ===
2010 Pre-season game log: 1–4–0 (home: 1–2–0; road: 0–2–0)

#	Date	Visitor	Score	Home	OT	Decision	Record	Recap
1	September 29 (in Saskatoon, SK)	Calgary Flames	3 – 2	New York Islanders (SS)		DiPietro	0–1–0	
2	September 29	New York Islanders	1 – 3	Philadelphia Flyers		Roloson	0–2–0	
3	October 1	New York Islanders	3 – 4	New Jersey Devils		Roloson	0–3–0	
4	October 2	New Jersey Devils	1 – 2	New York Islanders (SS)		DiPietro	1–3–0	
5	October 2 (in Quebec City, Quebec)	Montreal Canadiens	7 – 2	New York Islanders (SS)		Legace	1–4–0	
(SS) = Split-squad games.

=== Regular season ===
2010-11 Game Log: 30-39-13, 73 Points (home: 17-18-6; road: 13-21-7)
October: 4-5-2, 10 Points (home: 2-1-1; road: 2-4-1)

Game	October	Opponent	Score	Location/Attendance	Record	Points
1	9	Dallas Stars	4-5 (SO)	Nassau Veterans Memorial Coliseum (13,351)	0–0–1	1
2	11	New York Rangers	6-4	Nassau Veterans Memorial Coliseum (11,748)	1–0–1	3
3	13	@ Washington Capitals	1-2	Verizon Center (18,398)	1–1–1	3
4	15	@ Pittsburgh Penguins	2-3 (OT)	Consol Energy Center (18,195)	1–1–2	4
5	16	Colorado Avalanche	5-2	Nassau Veterans Memorial Coliseum (10,127)	2–1–2	6
6	18	@ Toronto Maple Leafs	2-1 (OT)	Air Canada Centre (19,086)	3–1–2	8
7	21	@ Tampa Bay Lightning	3-2 (OT)	St. Pete Times Forum (13,333)	4–1–2	10
8	23	@ Florida Panthers	3-4	BankAtlantic Center (15,071)	4–2–2	10
9	27	@ Montreal Canadiens	3-5	Bell Centre (21,273)	4–3–2	10
10	29	Montreal Canadiens	1-3	Nassau Veterans Memorial Coliseum (11,922)	4–4–2	10
11	30	@ Philadelphia Flyers	1-6	Wachovia Center (19,613)	4–5–2	10

November: 1-7-3, 5 Points (home: 1-3-1; road: 0-4-2)

Game	November	Opponent	Score	Location/Attendance	Record	Points
12	3	@ Carolina Hurricanes	2-7	RBC Center (13,043)	4–6–2	10
13	4	@ Ottawa Senators	1-4	Scotiabank Place (17,752)	4–7–2	10
14	6	Philadelphia Flyers	1-2	Nassau Veterans Memorial Coliseum (13,078)	4–8–2	10
15	10	@ Anaheim Ducks	0-1	Honda Center (14,393)	4–9–2	10
16	11	@ San Jose Sharks	1-2 (SO)	HP Pavilion (17,562)	4–9–3	11
17	13	@ Los Angeles Kings	1-5	Staples Center (18,118)	4–10–3	11
18	17	Tampa Bay Lightning	2-4	Nassau Veterans Memorial Coliseum (8,025)	4–11–3	11
19	20	Florida Panthers	1-4	Nassau Veterans Memorial Coliseum (9,157)	4–12–3	11
20	21	@ Atlanta Thrashers	1-2 (OT)	Philips Arena (10,066)	4–12–4	12
21	24	Columbus Blue Jackets	3-4 (OT)	Nassau Veterans Memorial Coliseum (8,652)	4–12–5	13
22	26	New Jersey Devils	2-0	Nassau Veterans Memorial Coliseum (10,897)	5–12–5	15

December: 6-7-1, 13 Points (home: 4-3-1; road: 2-4-0)

Game	December	Opponent	Score	Location/Attendance	Record	Points
23	2	New York Rangers	5-6	Nassau Veterans Memorial Coliseum (13,742)	5–13–5	15
24	3	@ New York Rangers	0-2	Madison Square Garden (18,200)	5–14–5	15
25	5	Philadelphia Flyers	2-3	Nassau Veterans Memorial Coliseum (7,773)	5–15–5	15
26	9	@ Boston Bruins	2-5	TD Garden (17,565)	5–16–5	15
27	11	Atlanta Thrashers	4-5	Nassau Veterans Memorial Coliseum (10,056)	5–17–5	15
28	13	@ Nashville Predators	0-5	Bridgestone Arena (14,314)	5–18–5	15
29	16	Anaheim Ducks	3-2	Nassau Veterans Memorial Coliseum (7,659)	6–18–5	17
30	18	Phoenix Coyotes	3-4 (SO)	Nassau Veterans Memorial Coliseum (8,433)	6–18–6	18
31	22	Tampa Bay Lightning	2-1 (OT)	Nassau Veterans Memorial Coliseum (7,324)	7–18–6	20
32	23	@ New Jersey Devils	5-1	Prudential Center (13,312)	8–18–6	22
33	26	Montreal Canadiens	4-1	Nassau Veterans Memorial Coliseum (3,136)	9–18–6	24
34	27	@ New York Rangers	2-7	Madison Square Garden (18,200)	9–19–6	24
35	29	Pittsburgh Penguins	2-1 (SO)	Nassau Veterans Memorial Coliseum (14,345)	10–19–6	26
36	31	@ Detroit Red Wings	4-3 (OT)	Joe Louis Arena (20,066)	11–19–6	28

January: 4-8-1, 9 Points (home: 1-5-1; road: 3-3-0)

Game	January	Opponent	Score	Location/Attendance	Record	Points
37	3	@ Calgary Flames	5-2	Scotiabank Saddledome (19,289)	12–19–6	30
38	6	@ Edmonton Oilers	1-2	Rexall Place (16,839)	12–20–6	30
39	8	@ Colorado Avalanche	4-3 (OT)	Pepsi Center (15,171)	13–20–6	32
40	9	@ Chicago Blackhawks	0-5	United Center (21,205)	13–21–6	32
41	11	Vancouver Canucks	3-4 (SO)	Nassau Veterans Memorial Coliseum (8,913)	13–21–7	33
42	13	Ottawa Senators	4-6	Nassau Veterans Memorial Coliseum (8,670)	13–22–7	33
43	15	Buffalo Sabres	5-3	Nassau Veterans Memorial Coliseum (12,223)	14–22–7	35
44	17	New Jersey Devils	2-5	Nassau Veterans Memorial Coliseum (13,119)	14–23–7	35
45	20	Washington Capitals	1-2	Nassau Veterans Memorial Coliseum (9,119)	14–24–7	35
46	21	@ Buffalo Sabres	5-2	HSBC Arena (18,690)	15–24–7	37
47	23	Buffalo Sabres	3-5	Nassau Veterans Memorial Coliseum (10,120)	15–25–7	37
48	25	@ Pittsburgh Penguins	0-1	Consol Energy Center (18,225)	15–26–7	37
49	26	Carolina Hurricanes	2-4	Nassau Veterans Memorial Coliseum (4,976)	15–27–7	37

February: 8-5-1, 17 Points (home: 4-3-0; road: 4-2-1)

Game	February	Opponent	Score	Location/Attendance	Record	Points
50	1	@ Atlanta Thrashers	4-1	Philips Arena (11,176)	16–27–7	39
51	2	@ Pittsburgh Penguins	0-3	Consol Energy Center (18,142)	16–28–7	39
52	5	Ottawa Senators	5-3	Nassau Veterans Memorial Coliseum (10,415)	17–28–7	41
53	8	Toronto Maple Leafs	3-5	Nassau Veterans Memorial Coliseum (7,249)	17–29–7	41
54	10	@ Montreal Canadiens	4-3 (SO)	Bell Centre (21,273)	18–29–7	43
55	11	Pittsburgh Penguins	9-3	Nassau Veterans Memorial Coliseum (12,888)	19–29–7	45
56	13	@ Buffalo Sabres	7-6 (OT)	HSBC Arena (18,690)	20–29–7	47
57	15	@ Ottawa Senators	4-3 (SO)	Scotiabank Place (17,565)	21–29–7	49
58	17	Boston Bruins	3-6	Nassau Veterans Memorial Coliseum (12,478)	21–30–7	49
59	19	Los Angeles Kings	3-0	Nassau Veterans Memorial Coliseum (13,119)	22–30–7	51
60	21	Florida Panthers	5-1	Nassau Veterans Memorial Coliseum (13,729)	23–30–7	53
61	22	@ Toronto Maple Leafs	1-2	Air Canada Centre (19,459)	23–31–7	53
62	24	@ Philadelphia Flyers	3-4 (OT)	Wachovia Center (19,776)	23–31–8	54
63	26	Washington Capitals	2-3	Nassau Veterans Memorial Coliseum (16,250)	23–32–8	54

March: 7-4-4, 18 Points (home: 5-2-1; road: 2-2-3)

Game	March	Opponent	Score	Location/Attendance	Record	Points
64	1	@ Washington Capitals	1-2 (OT)	Verizon Center (18,398)	23–32–9	55
65	2	Minnesota Wild	4-1	Nassau Veterans Memorial Coliseum (7,098)	24–32–9	57
66	5	St. Louis Blues	5-2	Nassau Veterans Memorial Coliseum (10,354)	25–32–9	59
67	6	New Jersey Devils	2-3 (SO)	Nassau Veterans Memorial Coliseum (15,893)	25–32–10	60
68	8	Toronto Maple Leafs	4-3 (OT)	Nassau Veterans Memorial Coliseum (9,217)	26–32–10	62
69	11	Boston Bruins	4-2	Nassau Veterans Memorial Coliseum (12,119)	27–32–10	64
70	12	@ New Jersey Devils	2-3 (OT)	Prudential Center (17,625)	27–32–11	65
71	15	@ New York Rangers	3-6	Madison Square Garden (18,200)	27–33–11	65
72	18	@ Carolina Hurricanes	2-3 (SO)	RBC Center (17,686)	27–33–12	66
73	19	@ Florida Panthers	4-3 (SO)	BankAtlantic Center (16,502)	28–33–12	68
74	22	@ Tampa Bay Lightning	5-2	St. Pete Times Forum (17,400)	29–33–12	70
75	24	Atlanta Thrashers	1-2	Nassau Veterans Memorial Coliseum (11,874)	29–34–12	70
76	26	Philadelphia Flyers	1-4	Nassau Veterans Memorial Coliseum (15,458)	29–35–12	70
77	30	@ New Jersey Devils	2-3	Prudential Center (16,252)	29–36–12	70
78	31	New York Rangers	6-2	Nassau Veterans Memorial Coliseum (16,250)	30–36–12	72

April: 0-3-1, 1 Points (home: 0-1-1; road: 0-2-0)

Game	April	Opponent	Score	Location/Attendance	Record	Points
79	2	Carolina Hurricanes	2-4	Nassau Veterans Memorial Coliseum (16,250)	30–37–12	72
80	6	@ Boston Bruins	2-3	TD Garden (17,565)	30–38–12	72
81	8	Pittsburgh Penguins	3-4 (SO)	Nassau Veterans Memorial Coliseum (16,250)	30–38–13	73
82	9	@ Philadelphia Flyers	4-7	Wachovia Center (19,909)	30–39–13	73

== Player statistics ==
=== Skaters ===
Note: GP = Games played; G = Goals; A = Assists; Pts = Points; +/− = Plus/minus; PIM = Penalty minutes

Regular season

Number	Position	Player	GP	G	A	Pts	+/−	PIM
91	LW	John Tavares	79	29	38	67	-16	53
15	RW	P. A. Parenteau	81	20	33	53	-8	46
26	LW	Matt Moulson	82	31	22	53	-10	24
40	RW	Michael Grabner	76	34	18	52	13	10
57	RW	Blake Comeau	77	24	22	46	-17	43
51	C	Frans Nielsen	71	13	31	44	13	38
12	C	Josh Bailey	70	11	17	28	-13	37
47	D	Andrew MacDonald	60	4	23	27	9	37
36	D	Travis Hamonic	62	5	21	26	4	103
38	D	Jack Hillen	64	4	18	22	-5	45
44	C	Rob Schremp^{‡}	45	10	12	22	-19	12
20	D	James Wisniewski^{‡}	32	3	18	21	-18	18
21	RW	Kyle Okposo	38	5	15	20	3	40
27	D	Milan Jurcina	46	4	13	17	-4	30
24	D	Radek Martinek	64	3	13	16	-5	35
17	LW	Matt Martin	68	5	9	14	-13	147
93	C	Doug Weight	18	2	7	9	-3	10
28	C	Zenon Konopka	82	2	7	9	-14	307
58	LW	Jesse Joensuu	42	6	3	9	-6	33
8	D	Bruno Gervais	53	0	6	6	-14	30
42	D	Dylan Reese	27	0	6	6	-12	15
6	D	Ty Wishart	20	1	4	5	5	10
16	LW	Jon Sim	34	1	3	4	-10	22
7	RW	Trent Hunter	17	1	3	4	-3	23
10	D	Mike Mottau	20	0	3	3	-12	8
4	D	Mark Eaton	34	0	3	3	-2	8
37	C	Jeremy Colliton	15	2	1	3	-7	10
59	C	Micheal Haley	27	2	1	3	-4	85
25	RW	Nino Niederreiter	9	1	1	2	-1	8
14	LW	Trevor Gillies	39	2	0	2	-3	165
81	C	Justin DiBenedetto	8	0	1	1	-2	2
71	D	Mark Katic	11	0	1	1	-9	4
49	RW	Rhett Rakhshani	2	0	0	0	-1	0
29	D	Jamie Doornbosch	1	0	0	0	-1	0
55	D	Shane Sims	1	0	0	0	0	0

=== Goaltenders ===
Note: GP = Games played; TOI = Time on ice (minutes); W = Wins; L = Losses; OT = Overtime losses; GA = Goals against; GAA= Goals against average; SA= Shots against; SV= Saves; Sv% = Save percentage; SO= Shutouts

Regular season

#	Player	GP	TOI	W	L	OT	GA	GAA	SA	Sv%	SO	G	A	PIM
39	Rick DiPietro	26	1533	8	14	4	88	3.44	773	.886	1	0	1	25
30	Dwayne Roloson^{‡}	20	1206	6	13	1	53	2.64	629	.916	0	0	1	2
35	Al Montoya	21	1154	9	5	5	46	2.39	585	.921	1	0	1	2
60	Kevin Poulin	10	491	4	2	1	20	2.44	262	.924	0	0	0	0
52	Nathan Lawson	10	384	1	4	2	26	4.06	243	.893	0	0	0	0
1	Mikko Koskinen	4	208	2	1	0	15	4.33	118	.873	0	0	0	0

^{†}Denotes player spent time with another team before joining Islanders. Stats reflect time with Islanders only.
^{‡}Traded mid-season. Stats reflect time with Islanders only.

== Awards and records ==
=== Awards ===
Regular Season
Player	Award	Reached
Dwayne Roloson	NHL First Star of the Week	December 27, 2010
Michael Grabner	NHL Third Star of the Week	January 31, 2011
Michael Grabner	NHL First Star of the Week	February 14, 2011
Michael Grabner	NHL Rookie of the Month	February 2011
Doug Weight	King Clancy Memorial Trophy	June 2011

=== Milestones ===
Regular Season
Player	Milestone	Reached
Nino Niederreiter	1st Career NHL Game	October 9, 2010
James Wisniewski	100th Career NHL Point	October 11, 2010
Nino Niederreiter	1st Career NHL Goal; 1st Career NHL Point	October 13, 2010
Nino Niederreiter	1st Career NHL Assist	October 21, 2010
Matt Martin	1st Career NHL Goal	October 29, 2010
Radek Martinek	400th Career NHL Game	October 30, 2010
John Tavares	100th Career NHL Game	November 24, 2010
Travis Hamonic	1st Career NHL Game	November 24, 2010
Travis Hamonic	1st Career NHL Assist; 1st Career NHL Point	December 2, 2010
Rhett Rakhshani	1st Career NHL Game	December 13, 2010
Nathan Lawson	1st Career NHL Game	December 18, 2010
Blake Comeau	200th Career NHL Game	December 23, 2010
Frans Nielsen	200th Career NHL Game	December 27, 2010
Kevin Poulin	1st Career NHL Game	January 6, 2011
Bruno Gervais	300th Career NHL Game	January 8, 2011
Kevin Poulin	1st Career NHL Win	January 8, 2011
Blake Comeau	100th Career NHL Point	January 11, 2011
Trevor Gillies	1st Career NHL Goal	January 13, 2011
Rick DiPietro	300th Career NHL Game	January 23, 2011
Travis Hamonic	1st Career NHL Goal	February 1, 2011
Kyle Okposo	100th Career NHL Point	February 1, 2011
Mikko Koskinen	1st Career NHL Game	February 8, 2011
Mikko Koskinen	1st Career NHL Win	February 10, 2011
Frans Nielson	100th Career NHL Point	February 10, 2011
Micheal Haley	1st Career NHL Goal; 1st Career NHL Point	February 11, 2011
John Tavares	100th Career NHL Point	February 13, 2011
Ty Wishart	1st Career NHL Goal	February 13, 2011
Nathan Lawson	1st Career NHL Win	February 15, 2011
Matt Moulson	100th Career NHL Point	February 22, 2011
Mark Katic	1st Career NHL Game; 1st Career NHL Assist; 1st Career NHL Point	February 24, 2011
Micheal Haley	1st Career NHL Assist	February 24, 2011
Justin DiBenedetto	1st Career NHL Game	March 1, 2011
Andrew MacDonald	100th Career NHL Game	March 5, 2011
Justin DiBenedetto	1st Career NHL Assist; 1st Career NHL Point	March 8, 2011
Josh Bailey	200th Career NHL Game	March 15, 2011
Radek Martinek	100th Career NHL Point	March 18, 2011
P. A. Parenteau	100th Career NHL Game	March 22, 2011
Shane Sims	1st Career NHL Game	April 9, 2011

== Transactions ==
The Islanders have been involved in the following transactions during the 2010–11 season.

=== Trades ===
Date	Details
May 25, 2010	To New York Rangers Jyri Niemi	To New York Islanders 6th-round pick in 2010
June 25, 2010	To Chicago Blackhawks 2nd-round pick in 2010; 2nd-round pick in 2010	To New York Islanders 1st-round pick in 2010
June 26, 2010	To Colorado Avalanche 4th-round pick in 2010	To New York Islanders 3rd-round pick in 2011
June 26, 2010	To Atlanta Thrashers 6th-round pick in 2010; 6th-round pick in 2010	To New York Islanders 5th-round pick in 2011
July 30, 2010	To Anaheim Ducks Conditional 3rd-round pick in 2011 (Note: Condition satisfied.)	To New York Islanders James Wisniewski
December 28, 2010	To Montreal Canadiens James Wisniewski	To New York Islanders 2nd-round pick in 2011; Conditional 5th-round pick in 2012 (Note: Condition not satisfied.)
January 1, 2011	To Tampa Bay Lightning Dwayne Roloson	To New York Islanders Ty Wishart
February 9, 2011	To Phoenix Coyotes 6th-round pick in 2011	To New York Islanders Al Montoya

=== Free agents acquired ===
Player	Former team	Contract terms
Mark Eaton	Pittsburgh Penguins	Two years, $5 million
Milan Jurcina	Washington Capitals	One year, $1 million
P. A. Parenteau	New York Rangers	One year, $600,000
Zenon Konopka	Tampa Bay Lightning	One year, $600,000
Jeremy Yablonski	Binghamton Senators	One year, $500,000
Andy Hilbert	Minnesota Wild	One year, $575,000
Rob Hisey	Springfield Falcons	One year, $500,000 entry-level contract
Mike Mottau	New Jersey Devils	Two years, $1.6 million
Jeremy Colliton	Bridgeport Sound Tigers	One-year, $500,000
Joel Martin	Odessa Jackalopes	One-year, $500,000
Matt Campanale	University of New Hampshire	Amateur Tryout Contract
Jamie Doornbosch	Kitchener Rangers	Amateur Tryout Contract
Tyler McNeely	Northeastern University	1 year, $525,000 entry-level contract

=== Free agents lost ===
Player	New team	Contract terms
Martin Biron	New York Rangers	Two years, $1.75 million
Tim Jackman	Calgary Flames	Two years, $1.1 million
Trevor Smith	Anaheim Ducks	One-year, $550,000
Jeremy Reich	Boston Bruins	One-year, $500,000
Greg Mauldin	Colorado Avalanche	One-year, $500,000
Joel Rechlicz	Hershey Bears	undisclosed
Jeff Tambellini	Vancouver Canucks	One-year, $500,000
Brendan Witt	TBD	contract bought out
Sean Bergenheim	Tampa Bay Lightning	One-year, $700,000
Freddy Meyer	Atlanta Thrashers	One-year, $600,000
Richard Park	Geneve-Servette HC	Three years

=== Claimed via waivers ===
Player	Former team	Date claimed off waivers
Michael Grabner	Florida Panthers	October 5, 2010
Evgeni Nabokov	Detroit Red Wings	January 22, 2011

=== Lost via waivers ===
Player	New team	Date claimed off waivers
Rob Schremp	Atlanta Thrashers	February 28, 2011

=== Players signings ===
Player	Contract terms	Date signed
Travis Hamonic	3 years, $2.625 million entry-level contract	May 27, 2010
Nathan Lawson	1 year, $500,000	July 2, 2010
Dylan Reese	1 year, $551,250	July 9, 2010
Dustin Kohn	1 year, $593,250	July 15, 2010
Rob Schremp	1 year, $786,500	July 15, 2010
Matt Moulson	1 year, $2.45 million	July 27, 2010
Jon Sim	1 year, $650,000	August 3, 2010
Doug Weight	1 year, $850,000	August 31, 2010
Nino Niederreiter	3 year entry-level contract	September 21, 2010
Milan Jurcina	1 year, $1.6 million contract extension	January 5, 2011
Matt Moulson	3 years, $9.4 million contract extension	January 27, 2011
P. A. Parenteau	1 year, $1.25 million contract extension	February 17, 2011
Aaron Ness	3 years, $2.375 million entry-level contract	March 16, 2011
Al Montoya	1 year, $601,000 contract extension	March 29, 2011
Matt Donovan	3 years, $2.625 million entry-level contract	March 30, 2011
Shane Sims	Amateur Tryout contract	April 9, 2011

== Draft picks ==
Round	Pick #	Player	Nationality	Position	Prior team	Prior league
1	5	Nino Niederreiter	Switzerland	LW	Portland Winterhawks	WHL
1	30 (from Chicago)	Brock Nelson	United States	C	Warroad High School	USHS-MN
3	65	Kirill Kabanov	Russia	LW	Moncton Wildcats	QMJHL
3	82 (from Phoenix)	Jason Clark	United States	LW/C	Shattuck-Saint Mary's	Midget Major AAA
5	125	Tony DeHart	United States	D	Oshawa Generals	OHL
7	185	Cody Rosen	Canada	G	Clarkson University	ECAC

== Farm teams ==
=== Bridgeport Sound Tigers ===
The Islanders' American Hockey League affiliate will remain to be the Bridgeport Sound Tigers in the 2010–11 season.

=== Kalamazoo Wings ===
On July 27, 2010, the Islanders signed an affiliation agreement with the Kalamazoo Wings of the ECHL for the 2010–11 season.

=== Odessa Jackalopes ===
The Odessa Jackalopes remain New York's Central Hockey League affiliate for the 2010–11 season.

=== Louisiana IceGators ===
On October 18, 2010, the Islanders signed an affiliation agreement with the Louisiana IceGators of the SPHL for the 2010–11 season.
