= 2010–11 Pittsburgh Penguins season =

NHL team season

2010–11 Pittsburgh Penguins
- Division: 2nd Atlantic
- Conference: 4th Eastern
- 2010–11 record: 49–25–8
- Home record: 24-14–2
- Road record: 24–11–6
- Goals for: 238
- Goals against: 199

Team information
- General manager: Ray Shero
- Coach: Dan Bylsma
- Captain: Sidney Crosby
- Alternate captains: Evgeni Malkin; Brooks Orpik; Jordan Staal
- Arena: Consol Energy Center; Heinz Field (1 game)
- Average attendance: 18,240 (100.9%) (40 games)

Team leaders
- Goals: Sidney Crosby (32)
- Assists: Kris Letang (42)
- Points: Sidney Crosby (66)
- Penalty minutes: Matt Cooke (129)
- Plus/minus: Sidney Crosby (+20); Alex Goligoski^{‡} (+20)
- Wins: Marc-Andre Fleury (36)
- Goals against average: Brent Johnson (2.17)

The 2010–11 Pittsburgh Penguins season was the team's 44th season in the National Hockey League (NHL). The Penguins began the season in their new arena, CONSOL Energy Center, which is adjacent from their old facility, Mellon Arena, which had been the third smallest and oldest arena in the NHL. The Penguins also hosted the 2011 NHL Winter Classic against the Washington Capitals at Heinz Field, home of the National Football League's Pittsburgh Steelers and NCAA's's Pittsburgh Panthers football.

== Pre-season ==
On June 16, the Pittsburgh Penguins announced that they would play a six-game pre-season, including the first-ever game at the new Consol Energy Center on September 22 against the Detroit Red Wings.

On July 26, 2010, longtime Penguins PA announcer John Barbero died of brain cancer at age 65.

=== Game log ===
2010 Pre-season: 5–1–0 (Home: 3–0–0; Road: 2–1–0)

#	Date	Visitor	Score	Home	OT	Decision	Attendance	Record	Recap
1	September 22	Detroit Red Wings	1–5	Pittsburgh Penguins		Fleury	18,087	1–0–0	Recap
2	September 24	Pittsburgh Penguins	5–4	Columbus Blue Jackets		Curry	10,694	2–0–0	Recap
3	September 25	Columbus Blue Jackets	1–3	Pittsburgh Penguins		Fleury	18,087	3–0–0	Recap
4	September 28	Chicago Blackhawks	1–4	Pittsburgh Penguins		Johnson	18,087	4–0–0	Recap
5	October 1	Pittsburgh Penguins	2–5	Chicago Blackhawks		Johnson	19,913	4–1–0	Recap
6	October 3	Pittsburgh Penguins	5–2	Detroit Red Wings		Fleury	17,501	5–1–0	Recap

Legend: = Win = Loss = OT/SO Loss

== Regular season ==
=== First half ===
The Penguins inaugurated their new arena on October 7 with a home opener against their in-state rivals, the Philadelphia Flyers, the defending Eastern Conference champions, whom they will play three times in the first month of the season. However, rookie Flyers goaltender Sergei Bobrovsky made his NHL debut, leading his team to a 3–2 victory. Flyers forward Daniel Briere scored the first goal in the new building. In the first month of the season, goaltender Marc-Andre Fleury struggled, posting a 1–5 record for the month while backup goaltender Brent Johnson was 5–0–1 and posting a shutout in the final game of the month against the Carolina Hurricanes. Injuries were another trend for the first month of the season, with Jordan Staal failing to play the first month of the season with an infection in his foot. Other injuries to Zbynek Michalek and Brooks Orpik weakened the defensive unit during the first month. During the month of November, the Penguins went on a 12-game winning streak beginning with a 3-1 victory against the Vancouver Canucks on November 17. At the same time team captain Sidney Crosby went on a 25-game point streak during which he recorded 26 goals and 24 assists. The Penguins winning streak ended on December 14 with 3-2 loss in Philadelphia.

After 41 games, the midpoint of the season, the Penguins held a 26–12–3 record with 55 points, a two-point improvement over last season and good for second in the division behind the Philadelphia Flyers and fourth in the Eastern Conference.

=== 2011 Winter Classic ===
The Penguins held the 2011 NHL Winter Classic at Heinz Field on January 1 against the Washington Capitals. This matchup pitted the two premiere stars of the game against each other, Sidney Crosby and Alexander Ovechkin. The Capitals won the contest however 3–1, overcoming a 1–0 Penguins lead in which Evgeni Malkin scored the lone Penguins goal. Jordan Staal made a return to the Penguins lineup in the Winter Classic after being held out all of the 2010 contests of the season due to foot and hand injuries.

Crosby suffered a concussion in an open ice hit in the Winter Classic but remained in the game and took part in the following contest with the Tampa Bay Lightning. Against Tampa Bay, however, he was hit again, this time behind the net against the boards and further aggravated his concussion. Crosby was held out of games from January 7 through the end of the regular season.

=== Second half ===
Defenseman Kris Letang had a breakout first half of the season, sitting second on the team in points scored behind center Sidney Crosby. Letang, Crosby, Evgeni Malkin and goaltender Marc-Andre Fleury were named to the roster of the 2011 NHL All-Star Game, though only Letang and Fleury made appearances, as Crosby and Malkin were held out of the contest with head and lower body injures, respectively.

Malkin also missed multiple games in late January due to a lingering lower body injury and a sinus infection. He returned to the lineup against the Buffalo Sabres on February 4, but reactivated the injury during a hit by Tyler Myers in the second period, tearing his right medial collateral ligament (MCL) and anterior cruciate ligament (ACL).

Crosby and Malkin were injured for most of January and into February. In spite of these injuries, the Penguins still held onto second place in the Division and fourth place in the Conference for most of the first half and middle of the season, going 8–3–1 without Crosby, which includes 4–1–0 without both Crosby and Malkin during the same 8–3–1 span.

Due to the absence of Malkin and Crosby, the Penguin's offense was not nearly as productive. This led general manager Ray Shero to make personnel adjustments before the February trade deadline. On February 21, the Penguins traded defenseman Alex Goligoski to the Dallas Stars for left winger James Neal and defenseman Matt Niskanen. The organization also acquired right winger Alex Kovalev from the Ottawa Senators for a conditional draft pick on February 24.

On March 25, the Penguins defeated the New Jersey Devils 1–0 in a shootout. James Neal scored the lone goal, marking the fourth year in a row the Penguins have won a game on March 25 in a shutout and the first to go to overtime or a shootout.

On March 28, the Penguins set an NHL record by winning their fourth consecutive game in a shootout. During the stretch, the team defeated the Detroit Red Wings, Philadelphia Flyers, New Jersey Devils and Florida Panthers in a seven-day period.

The Penguins concluded the regular season with the best penalty-kill percentage in the NHL, at 86.11%

=== Game log ===
2010–2011 Schedule
October: 6–5–1 (Home: 2–4–0; Road: 4–1–1), 13 Points

#	Oct	Time (ET)	Visitor	Score	Home	Location/Attendance	Record	Points
1	7	7:00 pm	Philadelphia Flyers	3–2	Pittsburgh Penguins	Consol Energy Center (18,289)	0–1–0	0
2	9	7:00 pm	Montreal Canadiens	3–2	Pittsburgh Penguins	Consol Energy Center (18,106)	0–2–0	0
3	11	4:00 pm	Pittsburgh Penguins	3–1	New Jersey Devils	Prudential Center (12,880)	1–2–0	2
4	13	7:30 pm	Toronto Maple Leafs	4–3	Pittsburgh Penguins	Consol Energy Center (18,112)	1–3–0	2
5	15	7:00 pm	New York Islanders	2–3 OT	Pittsburgh Penguins	Consol Energy Center (18,195)	2–3–0	4
6	16	6:00 pm	Pittsburgh Penguins	5–1	Philadelphia Flyers	Wells Fargo Center (19,684)	3–3–0	6
7	18	7:00 pm	Ottawa Senators	2–5	Pittsburgh Penguins	Consol Energy Center (18,101)	4–3–0	8
8	21	8:00 pm	Pittsburgh Penguins	4–3 OT	Nashville Predators	Bridgestone Arena (17,113)	5–3–0	10
9	23	8:00 pm	Pittsburgh Penguins	0–1 OT	St. Louis Blues	Scottrade Center (19,150)	5–3–1	11
10	27	7:30 pm	Pittsburgh Penguins	3–5	Tampa Bay Lightning	Amalie Arena (17,226)	5–4–1	11
11	29	7:00 pm	Philadelphia Flyers	3–2	Pittsburgh Penguins	Consol Energy Center (18,275)	5–5–1	11
12	30	7:00 pm	Pittsburgh Penguins	3–0	Carolina Hurricanes	PNC Arena (18,680)	6–5–1	13

November: 10–3–1 (Home: 5–1–1; Road: 5–2–0), 21 Points

#	Nov	Time (ET)	Visitor	Score	Home	Location/Attendance	Record	Points
13	3	8:30 pm	Pittsburgh Penguins	2–5	Dallas Stars	American Airlines Center (15,637)	6–6–1	13
14	5	10:00 pm	Pittsburgh Penguins	2–3	Anaheim Ducks	Honda Center (17,174)	6–7–1	13
15	6	9:00 pm	Pittsburgh Penguins	4–3 SO	Phoenix Coyotes	Gila River Arena (14,642)	7–7–1	15
16	10	7:00 pm	Boston Bruins	7–4	Pittsburgh Penguins	Consol Energy Center (18,113)	7–8–1	15
17	12	7:00 pm	Tampa Bay Lightning	1–5	Pittsburgh Penguins	Consol Energy Center (18,275)	8–8–1	17
18	13	7:00 pm	Pittsburgh Penguins	4–2	Atlanta Thrashers	Philips Arena (16,710)	9–8–1	19
19	15	7:00 pm	New York Rangers	3–2 OT	Pittsburgh Penguins	Consol Energy Center (18,125)	9–8–2	20
20	17	7:00 pm	Vancouver Canucks	1–3	Pittsburgh Penguins	Consol Energy Center (18,252)	10–8–2	22
21	19	7:00 pm	Carolina Hurricanes	4–5 SO	Pittsburgh Penguins	Consol Energy Center (18,264)	11–8–2	24
22	22	7:30 pm	Pittsburgh Penguins	3–2	Florida Panthers	BB&T Center (16,543)	12–8–2	26
23	24	7:00 pm	Pittsburgh Penguins	1–0	Buffalo Sabres	First Niagara Center (18,250)	13–8–2	28
24	26	1:00 pm	Ottawa Senators	1–2	Pittsburgh Penguins	Consol Energy Center (18,299)	14–8–2	30
25	27	1:00 pm	Calgary Flames	1–4	Pittsburgh Penguins	Consol Energy Center (18,317)	15–8–2	32
26	29	7:00 pm	Pittsburgh Penguins	3–1	New York Rangers	Madison Square Garden (IV) (18,200)	16–8–2	34

December: 9–3–1 (Home: 6–1–0; Road: 3–2–1), 19 Points

#	Dec	Time (ET)	Visitor	Score	Home	Location/Attendance	Record	Points
27	2	7:00 pm	Atlanta Thrashers	2–3	Pittsburgh Penguins	Consol Energy Center (18,223)	17–8–2	36
28	4	7:00 pm	Pittsburgh Penguins	7–2	Columbus Blue Jackets	Nationwide Arena (19,143)	18–8–2	38
29	6	7:00 pm	New Jersey Devils	1–2	Pittsburgh Penguins	Consol Energy Center (18,185)	19–8–2	40
30	8	7:00 pm	Toronto Maple Leafs	2–5	Pittsburgh Penguins	Consol Energy Center (18,158)	20–8–2	42
31	11	7:00 pm	Pittsburgh Penguins	5–2	Buffalo Sabres	First Niagara Center (18,690)	21–8–2	44
32	14	7:00 pm	Pittsburgh Penguins	2–3	Philadelphia Flyers	Wells Fargo Center (19,824)	21–9–2	44
33	15	7:00 pm	New York Rangers	4–1	Pittsburgh Penguins	Consol Energy Center (18,242)	21–10–2	44
34	20	7:00 pm	Phoenix Coyotes	1–6	Pittsburgh Penguins	Consol Energy Center (18,262)	22–10–2	46
35	22	7:00 pm	Florida Panthers	2–5	Pittsburgh Penguins	Consol Energy Center (18,238)	23–10–2	48
36	23	7:00 pm	Pittsburgh Penguins	3–2 SO	Washington Capitals	Verizon Center (18,398)	24–10–2	50
37	26	7:30 pm	Pittsburgh Penguins	1–3	Ottawa Senators	Canadian Tire Centre (20,146)	24–11–2	50
38	28	7:00 pm	Atlanta Thrashers	3–6	Pittsburgh Penguins	Consol Energy Center (18,322)	25–11–2	52
39	29	7:00 pm	Pittsburgh Penguins	1–2 SO	New York Islanders	Nassau Veterans Memorial Coliseum (14,345)	25–11–3	53

January: 6–4–1 (Home: 4–2-0; Road: 2–1–1), 13 Points

#	Jan	Time (ET)	Visitor	Score	Home	Location/Attendance	Record	Points
40	1	8:00 pm	Washington Capitals	3–1	Pittsburgh Penguins	Acrisure Stadium (68,111)	25–12–3	53
41	5	7:00 pm	Tampa Bay Lightning	1–8	Pittsburgh Penguins	Consol Energy Center (18,261)	26–12–3	55
42	6	7:30 pm	Pittsburgh Penguins	1–2 SO	Montreal Canadiens	Bell Centre (21,273)	26–12–4	56
43	8	7:00 pm	Minnesota Wild	4–0	Pittsburgh Penguins	Consol Energy Center (18,263)	26–13–4	56
44	10	7:30 pm	Boston Bruins	4–2	Pittsburgh Penguins	Consol Energy Center (18,245)	26–14–4	56
45	12	7:30 pm	Pittsburgh Penguins	5–2	Montreal Canadiens	Bell Centre (21,273)	27–14–4	58
46	15	1:00 pm	Pittsburgh Penguins	3–2	Boston Bruins	TD Garden (17,565)	28–14–4	60
47	18	7:00 pm	Detroit Red Wings	1–4	Pittsburgh Penguins	Consol Energy Center (18,284)	29–14–4	62
48	20	7:00 pm	Pittsburgh Penguins	0–2	New Jersey Devils	Prudential Center (14,890)	29–15–4	62
49	22	7:00 pm	Carolina Hurricanes	2–3	Pittsburgh Penguins	Consol Energy Center (18,305)	30–15–4	64
50	25	7:00 pm	New York Islanders	0–1	Pittsburgh Penguins	Consol Energy Center (18,225)	31–15–4	66

February: 6–6–2 (Home: 3–2–1; Road: 3–4–1), 14 Points

#	Feb	Time (ET)	Visitor	Score	Home	Location/Attendance	Record	Points
51	1	7:30 pm	Pittsburgh Penguins	4–3 SO	New York Rangers	Madison Square Garden (IV) (18,200)	32–15–4	68
52	2	7:00 pm	New York Islanders	0–3	Pittsburgh Penguins	Consol Energy Center (18,142)	33–15–4	70
53	4	7:00 pm	Buffalo Sabres	2–3	Pittsburgh Penguins	Consol Energy Center (18,315)	34–15–4	72
54	6	12:30 pm	Pittsburgh Penguins	0–3	Washington Capitals	Verizon Center (18,398)	34–16–4	72
55	8	7:00 pm	Columbus Blue Jackets	4–1	Pittsburgh Penguins	Consol Energy Center (18,147)	34–17–4	72
56	10	7:00 pm	Los Angeles Kings	1–2 OT	Pittsburgh Penguins	Consol Energy Center (18,208)	35–17–4	74
57	11	7:00 pm	Pittsburgh Penguins	3–9	New York Islanders	Nassau Veterans Memorial Coliseum (12,888)	35–18–4	74
58	13	3:00 pm	Pittsburgh Penguins	3–5	New York Rangers	Madison Square Garden (IV) (18,200)	35–19–4	74
59	16	9:00 pm	Pittsburgh Penguins	3–2 OT	Colorado Avalanche	Pepsi Center (17,357)	36–19–4	76
60	20	3:30 pm	Pittsburgh Penguins	2–3 SO	Chicago Blackhawks	United Center (22,195)	36–19–5	77
61	21	7:30 pm	Washington Capitals	1–0	Pittsburgh Penguins	Consol Energy Center (18,263)	36–20–5	77
62	23	7:30 pm	San Jose Sharks	3–2 OT	Pittsburgh Penguins	Consol Energy Center (18,253)	36–20–6	78
63	25	7:00 pm	Pittsburgh Penguins	1–4	Carolina Hurricanes	PNC Arena (18,719)	36–21–6	78
64	26	7:00 pm	Pittsburgh Penguins	6–5 SO	Toronto Maple Leafs	Air Canada Centre (19,551)	37–21–6	80

March: 8–4–2 (Home: 4–3–0; Road: 4–1–2), 18 Points

#	Mar	Time (ET)	Visitor	Score	Home	Location/Attendance	Record	Points
65	2	7:00 pm	Pittsburgh Penguins	2–3 OT	Toronto Maple Leafs	Air Canada Centre (19,473)	37–21–7	81
66	4	7:00 pm	Pittsburgh Penguins	1–2 OT	New Jersey Devils	Prudential Center (17,625)	37–21–8	82
67	5	7:00 pm	Pittsburgh Penguins	3–2 OT	Boston Bruins	TD Garden (17,565)	38–21–8	84
68	8	7:00 pm	Buffalo Sabres	1–3	Pittsburgh Penguins	Consol Energy Center (18,314)	39–21–8	86
69	12	2:00 pm	Montreal Canadiens	3–0	Pittsburgh Penguins	Consol Energy Center (18,310)	39–22–8	86
70	13	3:00 pm	Edmonton Oilers	1–5	Pittsburgh Penguins	Consol Energy Center (18,197)	40–22–8	88
71	15	7:30 pm	Pittsburgh Penguins	5–1	Ottawa Senators	Canadian Tire Centre (19,249)	41–22–8	90
72	20	12:30 pm	New York Rangers	5–2	Pittsburgh Penguins	Consol Energy Center (18,278)	41–23–8	90
73	21	7:30 pm	Pittsburgh Penguins	5–4 SO	Detroit Red Wings	Joe Louis Arena (20,066)	42–23–8	92
74	24	7:00 pm	Pittsburgh Penguins	2–1 SO	Philadelphia Flyers	Wells Fargo Center (19,902)	43–23–8	94
75	25	7:00 pm	New Jersey Devils	0–1 SO	Pittsburgh Penguins	Consol Energy Center (18,329)	44–23–8	96
76	27	1:00 pm	Florida Panthers	1–2 SO	Pittsburgh Penguins	Consol Energy Center (18,270)	45–23–8	98
77	29	7:00 pm	Philadelphia Flyers	5–2	Pittsburgh Penguins	Consol Energy Center (18,335)	45–24–8	98
78	31	7:30 pm	Pittsburgh Penguins	1–2	Tampa Bay Lightning	Amalie Arena (20,126)	45–25–8	98

April: 4–0–0 (Home: 1–0–0; Road: 3–0–0), 8 Points

#	Apr	Time (ET)	Visitor	Score	Home	Location/Attendance	Record	Points
79	2	7:00 pm	Pittsburgh Penguins	4–2	Florida Panthers	BB&T Center (18,178)	46–25–8	100
80	5	7:30 pm	New Jersey Devils	2–4	Pittsburgh Penguins	Consol Energy Center (18,331)	47–25–8	102
81	8	7:00 pm	Pittsburgh Penguins	4–3 SO	New York Islanders	Nassau Veterans Memorial Coliseum (16,250)	48–25–8	104
82	10	3:00 pm	Pittsburgh Penguins	5–2	Atlanta Thrashers	Philips Arena (16,085)	49–25–8	106

Legend: = Win = Loss = OT/SO Loss

=== Standings ===
Atlantic Division
		GP	W	L	OTL	ROW	GF	GA	Pts
**1**	**Philadelphia Flyers**	**82**	**47**	**23**	**12**	**44**	**259**	**223**	**106**
**2**	**Pittsburgh Penguins**	**82**	**49**	**25**	**8**	**39**	**238**	**199**	**106**
**3**	**New York Rangers**	**82**	**44**	**33**	**5**	**35**	**233**	**198**	**93**
4	New Jersey Devils	82	38	39	5	35	174	209	81
5	New York Islanders	82	30	39	13	26	229	264	73

Eastern Conference
R		Div	GP	W	L	OTL	ROW	GF	GA	Pts
**1**	**z – Washington Capitals**	**SE**	**82**	**48**	**23**	**11**	**43**	**224**	**197**	107
**2**	**y – Philadelphia Flyers**	**AT**	**82**	**47**	**23**	**12**	**44**	**259**	**223**	106
**3**	**y – Boston Bruins**	**NE**	**82**	**46**	**25**	**11**	**44**	**246**	**195**	103
**4**	**Pittsburgh Penguins**	**AT**	**82**	**49**	**25**	**8**	**39**	**238**	**199**	106
**5**	**Tampa Bay Lightning**	**SE**	**82**	**46**	**25**	**11**	**40**	**247**	**240**	103
**6**	**Montreal Canadiens**	**NE**	**82**	**44**	**30**	**8**	**41**	**216**	**209**	96
**7**	**Buffalo Sabres**	**NE**	**82**	**43**	**29**	**10**	**38**	**245**	**229**	96
**8**	**New York Rangers**	**AT**	**82**	**44**	**33**	**5**	**35**	**233**	**198**	93
8.5
9	Carolina Hurricanes	SE	82	40	31	11	35	236	239	91
10	Toronto Maple Leafs	NE	82	37	34	11	32	218	251	85
11	New Jersey Devils	AT	82	38	39	5	35	174	209	81
12	Atlanta Thrashers	SE	82	34	36	12	29	223	269	80
13	Ottawa Senators	NE	82	32	40	10	30	192	250	74
14	New York Islanders	AT	82	30	39	13	26	229	264	73
15	Florida Panthers	SE	82	30	40	12	26	195	229	72

bold – qualified for playoffs; y – Won division; z – Placed first in conference (and division)
AT – Atlantic Division, NE – Northeast Division, SE – Southeast Division

=== Detailed records ===
Final

**Eastern Conference**
Atlantic	GP	W	L	OT	SHOTS	GF	GA	PP	PK	FO W–L
Philadelphia Flyers	6	2	4	0	172–162	15	16	6–29	5–27	183–163
**Pittsburgh Penguins**										
New York Rangers	6	2	3	1	189–160	15	21	2–22	7–22	170–171
New Jersey Devils	6	4	1	1	167–154	11	8	2–20	2–17	139–152
New York Islanders	6	4	1	1	197–173	15	16	6–32	4–28	183–187
Division Total	24	12	9	3	725–649	56	61	16–103	18–94	675–673

Northeast	GP	W	L	OT	SHOTS	GF	GA	PP	PK	FO W–L
Boston Bruins	4	2	2	0	146–142	12	15	2–11	3–13	108–122
Montreal Canadiens	4	1	2	1	132–92	8	10	4–17	0–13	113–105
Buffalo Sabres	4	4	0	0	123–125	12	5	0–20	1–12	130–112
Toronto Maple Leafs	4	2	1	1	120–90	16	14	2–11	4–20	122–114
Ottawa Senators	4	3	1	0	155–124	13	7	4–17	4–15	107–120
Division Total	20	12	6	2	676–573	61	51	12–76	12–73	580–573

Southeast	GP	W	L	OT	SHOTS	GF	GA	PP	PK	FO W–L
Washington Capitals	4	1	3	0	121–114	4	9	0–14	3–15	123–132
Tampa Bay Lightning	4	2	2	0	129–103	17	9	2–18	2–21	128–127
Carolina Hurricanes	4	3	1	0	132–114	12	10	2–11	1–18	125–108
Atlanta Thrashers	4	4	0	0	112–128	18	9	3–13	4–20	107–118
Florida Panthers	4	4	0	0	122–134	14	7	2–11	0–12	97–125
Division Total	20	14	6	0	616–593	65	44	9–67	10–86	580–610
Conference Total	64	38	21	5	2017–1815	182	156	37–246	40–253	1835–1856

**Western Conference**
Central	GP	W	L	OT	SHOTS	GF	GA	PP	PK	FO W–L
Detroit Red Wings	2	2	0	0	54–78	9	5	0–4	2–8	47–75
Nashville Predators	1	1	0	0	38–24	4	3	0–5	1–4	30–28
Chicago Blackhawks	1	0	0	1	26–31	2	3	0–4	0–3	26–44
St. Louis Blues	1	0	0	1	31–24	0	1	0–4	0–3	21–25
Columbus Blue Jackets	2	1	1	0	68–48	8	6	4–6	1–7	62–48
Division Total	7	4	1	2	217–205	23	18	4–23	4–25	186–220

Northwest	GP	W	L	OT	SHOTS	GF	GA	PP	PK	FO W–L
Vancouver Canucks	1	1	0	0	29–30	3	1	0–2	0–5	26–39
Calgary Flames	1	1	0	0	43–31	4	1	1–3	0–4	30–36
Minnesota Wild	1	0	1	0	26–37	0	4	0–4	0–5	20–38
Colorado Avalanche	1	1	0	0	36–31	3	2	1–5	0–2	25–29
Edmonton Oilers	1	1	0	0	33–29	5	1	1–6	0–4	36–21
Division Total	5	4	1	0	167–158	15	9	3–20	0–20	137–163

Pacific	GP	W	L	OT	SHOTS	GF	GA	PP	PK	FO W–L
San Jose Sharks	1	0	0	1	26–38	2	3	0–2	1–4	33–30
Anaheim Ducks	1	0	1	0	32–19	2	3	1–4	0–2	22–18
Phoenix Coyotes	2	2	0	0	74–55	10	4	4–10	0–12	56–67
Los Angeles Kings	1	1	0	0	26–33	2	1	0–2	0–3	30–21
Dallas Stars	1	0	1	0	23–29	2	5	0–4	0–5	30–28
Division Total	6	3	2	1	181–174	18	16	5–22	1–26	171–164
Conference Total	18	11	4	3	565–537	56	43	12–65	5–71	494–547
NHL Total	82	49	25	8	2582–2352	238	199	49–311	45–324	2329–2403

== Playoffs ==
The Pittsburgh Penguins qualified for the Stanley Cup Playoffs for the fifth consecutive season. Their opponent in the first round were the Tampa Bay Lightning.

In Game 4 of the series on April 20, the Penguins defeated the Lightning on the road, 3–2 in double overtime. James Neal once again scored the winning goal. It marked the second time James Neal that Neal had scored the game-winning goal for the Penguins; the first time had been the shootout-winning goal on March 25 in a 1–0 victory over the New Jersey Devils.

On April 27, the Penguins were officially eliminated from the Stanley Cup Playoffs with a 1–0 loss to the Lightning in Game 7; it marked the second time in two years that the Penguins had lost a Game 7 on home ice and it was the first time that they had been eliminated in the first round of the playoffs since 2007. Furthermore, the Penguins were the third team to be knocked out of the playoffs in the debut of their new facility.

=== Game log ===
2011 Stanley Cup Playoffs
Eastern Conference quarterfinals vs No. 5 Tampa Bay Lightning: 3–4 (Home: 1–3; Road: 2–1)

#	Date	Visitor	Score	Home	OT	PIT goals	TBL goals	Decision	Attendance	Series	Recap
1	April 13	Tampa Bay	0–3	Pittsburgh		Kovalev, Asham, Kunitz		Fleury (1–0)	18,390	1–0	
2	April 15	Tampa Bay	5–1	Pittsburgh		Adams	Brewer, Lecavalier, Thompson, St. Louis, Ohlund	Fleury (1–1)	18,507	1–1	
3	April 18	Pittsburgh	3–2	Tampa Bay		Talbot, Asham, Kennedy	St. Louis, St. Louis	Fleury (2–1)	20,545	2–1	
4	April 20	Pittsburgh	3–2	Tampa Bay	2OT	Kennedy, Asham, Neal	St. Louis, Bergenheim	Fleury (3–1)	20,326	3–1	
5	April 23	Tampa Bay	8–2	Pittsburgh		Rupp, Conner	Gagne, Stamkos, Lecavalier, Gagne, Stamkos, Kubina, Kubina, Moore	Fleury (3–2)	18,535	3–2	
6	April 25	Pittsburgh	2–4	Tampa Bay		Dupuis, Staal	Purcell, Bergenheim, Downie, Malone	Fleury (3–3)	20,309	3–3	
7	April 27	Tampa Bay	1–0	Pittsburgh			Bergenheim	Fleury (3–4)	18,507	3–4	

Legend: = Win = Loss = OT/SO Loss

- Scorer of game-winning goal in italics.

== Player statistics ==
Skaters

Regular season
Player	GP	G	A	Pts	+/−	PIM
Sidney Crosby	41	32	34	66	20	31
Kris Letang	82	8	42	50	15	101
Chris Kunitz	66	23	25	48	18	47
Tyler Kennedy	80	21	24	45	1	37
Pascal Dupuis	81	17	20	37	16	59
Evgeni Malkin	43	15	22	37	-4	18
Alex Goligoski^{‡}	60	9	22	31	20	28
Matt Cooke	67	12	18	30	14	129
Jordan Staal	42	11	19	30	7	24
Mark Letestu	64	14	13	27	4	13
Paul Martin	77	3	21	24	9	16
Max Talbot	82	8	13	21	-3	66
Zbynek Michalek	73	5	14	19	0	30
Mike Rupp	81	9	8	17	-4	124
Ben Lovejoy	47	3	14	17	11	48
Chris Conner	60	7	9	16	5	10
Craig Adams	80	4	11	15	-5	76
Brooks Orpik	63	1	12	13	12	66
Dustin Jeffrey	25	7	5	12	5	4
Arron Asham	44	5	6	11	0	46
Deryk Engelland	63	3	7	10	-5	123
Alex Kovalev^{†}	20	2	5	7	3	16
Mike Comrie	21	1	5	6	-4	18
James Neal^{†}	20	1	5	6	-1	6
Brett Sterling	7	3	2	5	1	16
Matt Niskanen^{†}	18	1	3	4	-2	20
Nick Johnson	4	1	2	3	1	5
Eric Tangradi	15	1	2	3	-4	10
Eric Godard	19	0	3	3	4	105
Joe Vitale	9	1	1	2	-1	13
Andrew Hutchinson	5	0	1	1	-3	6
Ryan Craig	6	0	0	0	-3	22
Corey Potter	1	0	0	0	0	0
Brian Strait	3	0	0	0	-1	0
Tim Wallace	7	0	0	0	-3	5
Total		228	388	616	—	1,338

Playoffs
Player	GP	G	A	Pts	+/−	PIM
Arron Asham	7	3	1	4	2	2
Max Talbot	7	1	3	4	1	14
Kris Letang	7	0	4	4	0	10
Tyler Kennedy	7	2	1	3	0	2
Jordan Staal	7	1	2	3	-2	2
Brooks Orpik	7	0	3	3	-2	14
Alex Kovalev	7	1	1	2	-3	10
Mike Rupp	7	1	1	2	4	4
James Neal	7	1	1	2	-1	6
Paul Martin	7	0	2	2	1	2
Ben Lovejoy	7	0	2	2	0	4
Craig Adams	7	1	0	1	2	2
Pascal Dupuis	7	1	0	1	-2	2
Chris Kunitz	6	1	0	1	-1	6
Chris Conner	7	1	0	1	1	0
Zbynek Michalek	7	0	1	1	1	0
Matt Niskanen	7	0	1	1	-3	0
Mark Letestu	7	0	1	1	-3	0
Eric Tangradi	1	0	0	0	0	0
Total		14	24	38	—	80

Goaltenders

Regular season
Player	GP	GS	TOI	W	L	OT	GA	GAA	SA	SV%	SO	G	A	PIM
Marc-Andre Fleury	65	62	3695:10	36	20	5	143	2.32	1742	0.918	3	0	1	10
Brent Johnson	23	20	1296:42	13	5	3	47	2.17	604	0.922	1	0	1	24
Total		82	4991:52	49	25	8	190	2.28	2346	0.919	4	0	2	34

Playoffs
Player	GP	GS	TOI	W	L	OT	GA	GAA	SA	SV%	SO	G	A	PIM
Marc-Andre Fleury	7	7	405:12	3	4	--	17	2.52	168	0.899	1	0	0	0
Brent Johnson	1	0	34:29	0	0	--	4	6.96	11	0.636	0	0	0	2
Total		7	439:41	3	4	0	21	2.87	179	0.883	1	0	0	2

^{†}Denotes player spent time with another team before joining the Penguins. Stats reflect time with the Penguins only.
^{‡}Denotes player was traded mid-season. Stats reflect time with the Penguins only.

== Transactions ==
The Penguins have been involved in the following transactions during the 2010–11 season.

=== Trades ===
May 28, 2010	To Anaheim Ducks: 6th-round pick in 2010	To Pittsburgh Penguins: Mattias Modig
June 25, 2010	To Philadelphia Flyers: 3rd-round pick in 2011	To Pittsburgh Penguins: Dan Hamhuis (Note: Trade of negotiating rights to.)
June 26, 2010	To San Jose Sharks: 7th-round pick in 2010	To Pittsburgh Penguins: 7th-round pick in 2011
February 21, 2011	To Dallas Stars: Alex Goligoski	To Pittsburgh Penguins: James Neal; Matt Niskanen
February 24, 2011	To Ottawa Senators: Conditional 7th-round pick in 2011 (Note: Condition satisfied.)	To Pittsburgh Penguins: Alexei Kovalev

=== Free agents acquired ===
Player	Former team	Contract terms
Zbynek Michalek	Phoenix Coyotes	5 years/$20 million
Paul Martin	New Jersey Devils	5 years/$25 million
Ryan Craig	Tampa Bay Lightning	1 year/$500,000 (two-way)
Brett Sterling	San Jose Sharks	1 year/$500,000 (two-way)
Andrew Hutchinson	Dallas Stars	1 year/$500,000 (two-way)
Corey Potter	New York Rangers	1 year/$500,000 (two-way)
Arron Asham	Philadelphia Flyers	1 year/$700,000
Mike Comrie	Edmonton Oilers	1 year/$500,000
Paul Thompson	University of New Hampshire	2 years/$1.23 million (entry-level)
Brian Gibbons	Boston College	2 years/$1.33 million (entry-level)

=== Free agents lost ===
Player	Former team	Contract terms
Sergei Gonchar	Ottawa Senators	3 years/$16.5 million
Jordan Leopold	Buffalo Sabres	3 years/$9 million
Mark Eaton	New York Islanders	2 years/$5 million
Dan Hamhuis	Vancouver Canucks	6 years/$27 million
Alexei Ponikarovsky	Los Angeles Kings	1 year/$3 million
Ruslan Fedotenko	New York Rangers	1 year/$1 million

=== Player signings ===
Player	Date	Contract terms
Deryk Engelland	May 19, 2010	1 year/$500,000 (two-way)
Nick Petersen	May 27, 2010	3 years/$1.7 million (entry-level)
Mattias Modig	May 28, 2010	2 years/$1.2 million (entry-level)
Nick Johnson	June 8, 2010	1 year/$500,000 (two-way)
Steve Wagner	June 14, 2010	1 year/$500,000 (two-way)
Ben Lovejoy	June 21, 2010	3 years/$1.575 million (two-way first year)
Matt Cooke	June 22, 2010	3 years/$5.4 million
Chris Conner	July 13, 2010	1 year/$550,000 (two-way)
Deryk Engelland	January 3, 2011	3 years/$1.7 million
Mark Letestu	January 18, 2011	2 years/$1.25 million
Tom Kuhnhackl	March 22, 2011	3 years/$1.83 million (entry-level)
Philip Samuelsson	April 12, 2011	3 years/$1.845 million (entry-level)

== Notable achievements ==
=== Awards ===
Regular season
Player	Award	Awarded
Sidney Crosby	NHL Second Star of the Week	November 15, 2010
Sidney Crosby	NHL Third Star of the Week	November 29, 2010
Sidney Crosby	NHL First Star of the Month	November 2010
Sidney Crosby	NHL First Star of the Week	December 6, 2010
Marc-Andre Fleury	NHL Second Star of the Week	December 13, 2010
Sidney Crosby	NHL Third Star of the Week	December 27, 2010
Sidney Crosby	NHL First Star of the Month	December 2010
Dan Bylsma	Jack Adams Award (Best Coach)	June 2011

=== Team awards ===
Player	Award	Notes
Mark Letestu	Michel Brière Rookie of the Year Award	Presented to the Penguins player judged to be the best rookie on the team. The trophy is presented in memory of the late Michel Briere, who was an outstanding forward in his only season with the Penguins in 1969–70.
Mike Rupp	Baz Bastien Memorial Award	Presented by the Pittsburgh Chapter of the Professional Hockey Writers Association to the player who the local media of the PHWA want to acknowledge for his cooperation throughout the year. The award is presented in memory of the late Aldege "Baz" Bastien, Penguins general manager from 1976 to 1983. Sponsor: UPMC Sports medicine
Deryk Engelland	Bill Masterton Memorial Trophy nominee	The Pittsburgh Chapter of the Professional Hockey Writers Association votes for the Penguins' Masterton nominee. Each NHL team selects a Masterton candidate from which the overall winner is chosen. The Masterton candidate is nominated as the player who best exemplifies the qualities of perseverance, sportsmanship and dedication to hockey. Sponsor: Trib Total Media
Marc-Andre Fleury	A. T. Caggiano Memorial Booster Club Cup	Presented in memory of A.T. Caggiano, long-time Penguins' locker room attendant & Booster Club supporter, the award is presented by Penguins Booster Club members, who vote for the three stars after every home game and tally votes at the end of the regular season.
Brooks Orpik	Player's Player Award	The players hold a vote at the end of the season for the player they feel exemplifies leadership for the team, both on and off the ice, a player dedicated to teamwork. Sponsor: Highmark Blue Cross Blue Shield
Maxime Talbot; Mike Rupp	Edward J. DeBartolo Award	The award recognizes the player who has donated a tremendous amount of time and effort during the season working on community and charity projects. Sponsor: Verizon Wireless
Brooks Orpik	Defensive Player of the Year	This award honors the defensive skills of an individual player on the team. Sponsor: PNC Wealth Management
Marc-Andre Fleury	Most Valuable Player	Based on the overall contribution the player makes to the team. Sponsor: Consol Energy

=== Milestones ===
Regular season
Player	Award	Awarded
Eric Tangradi	1st Career NHL Assist	October 11, 2010
Eric Tangradi	1st Career NHL Point	October 11, 2010
Mark Letestu	1st Career NHL Assist	October 15, 2010
Eric Tangradi	1st Career NHL Goal	October 15, 2010
Craig Adams	600th Career NHL Game	November 3, 2010
Pascal Dupuis	600th Career NHL Game	November 5, 2010
Tyler Kennedy	200th Career NHL Game	November 5, 2010
Chris Kunitz	400th Career NHL Game	November 6, 2010
Deryk Engelland	1st Career NHL Goal	November 12, 2010
Aaron Asham	100th Career NHL Assist	November 13, 2010
Evgeni Malkin	400th Career NHL Point	November 19, 2010
Sidney Crosby	200th Career NHL Goal	November 27, 2010
Kris Letang	100th Career NHL Point	November 27, 2010
Sidney Crosby	400th Career NHL Game	December 6, 2010
Ben Lovejoy	1st Career NHL Goal	December 22, 2010
Chris Conner	100th Career NHL Game	December 26, 2010
Tyler Kennedy	100th Career NHL Point	January 18, 2011
Maxime Talbot	100th Career NHL Point	February 2, 2011
Joe Vitale	1st Career NHL Game	February 10, 2011
Brooks Orpik	500th Career NHL Game	February 11, 2011
Joe Vitale	1st Career NHL Assist	February 11, 2011
Joe Vitale	1st Career NHL Point	February 11, 2011
Joe Vitale	1st Career NHL Goal	February 17, 2011
Brian Strait	1st Career NHL Game	February 21, 2011
Matt Cooke	800th Career NHL Game	March 5, 2011
Zbynek Michalek	100th Career NHL Assist	March 5, 2011
Matt Cooke	300th Career NHL Point	March 13, 2011
Jordan Staal	100th Career NHL Assist	April 2, 2011
Alexei Kovalev	1,300th Career NHL Game	April 5, 2011
Kris Letang	100th Career NHL Assist	April 8, 2011

Playoffs
Player	Award	Awarded
Ben Lovejoy	1st Career NHL Playoff Game	April 13, 2011
James Neal	1st Career NHL Playoff Game	April 13, 2011
James Neal	1st Career NHL Playoff Assist	April 13, 2011
James Neal	1st Career NHL Playoff Point	April 13, 2011
Ben Lovejoy	1st Career NHL Playoff Assist	April 18, 2011
Ben Lovejoy	1st Career NHL Playoff Point	April 18, 2011
James Neal	1st Career NHL Playoff Goal	April 20, 2011
Eric Tangradi	1st Career NHL Playoff Game	April 20, 2011
Chris Conner	1st Career NHL Playoff Goal	April 23, 2011
Chris Conner	1st Career NHL Playoff Point	April 23, 2011
Alexei Kovalev	100th Career NHL Playoff Point	April 23, 2011

== Draft picks ==
Pittsburgh Penguins' picks at the 2010 NHL entry draft, held on June 25–26 at the Staples Center in Los Angeles.

Round	Pick #	Player	Position	Nationality	College/junior/club team (league)
1	20	Beau Bennett	RW	United States	Penticton Vees (BCHL)
3	80	Bryan Rust	RW	United States	U.S. National Team Development Program (USHL)
4	110	Tom Kuhnhackl	RW	Germany	Landshut Cannibals (2nd Bundesliga)
5	140	Kenny Agostino	LW	United States	Delbarton School (USHS-NJ)
6	152^{[a]}	Joe Rogalski	D	United States	Sarnia Sting (OHL)
6	170	Reid McNeill	D	Canada	London Knights (OHL)

Draft notes

- The Pittsburgh Penguins' second-round pick went to the Florida Panthers as the result of a March 1, 2010, trade that sent Jordan Leopold to the Penguins in exchange for this pick.
- ^{a} The Toronto Maple Leafs' sixth-round pick went to the Pittsburgh Penguins as a result of a March 3, 2010, trade that sent Chris Peluso to the Maple Leafs in exchange for this pick.
- The Pittsburgh Penguins' seventh-round pick went to the San Jose Sharks as the result of a June 26, 2010, trade that sent 2011 seventh-round pick to the Penguins in exchange for this pick.
