= Modigs =

Modigs is a Swedish surname.

== Notable people ==
- Johan Modig (born 1977), Swedish orienteering competitor
- Marcus Modigs (born 1992), Swedish professional ice hockey player
- Mattias Modig (born 1987), Swedish professional ice hockey player
- Mattias Modig (born 1989), Swedish professional seller and businessman
