= 2010–11 New York Rangers season =

NHL hockey team season

2010–11 New York Rangers
- Division: 3rd Atlantic
- Conference: 8th Eastern
- 2010–11 record: 44–33–5
- Home record: 20–17–4
- Road record: 24–16–1
- Goals for: 233
- Goals against: 198

Team information
- General manager: Glen Sather
- Coach: John Tortorella
- Captain: Chris Drury
- Alternate captains: Ryan Callahan; Marc Staal
- Arena: Madison Square Garden
- Average attendance: 18,103 (99.5%)

Team leaders
- Goals: Brandon Dubinsky (24)
- Assists: Brandon Dubinsky (30)
- Points: Brandon Dubinsky (54)
- Penalty minutes: Sean Avery (174)
- Plus/minus: Michael Sauer (+20)
- Wins: Henrik Lundqvist (36)
- Goals against average: Martin Biron (2.13)

The 2010–11 New York Rangers season was the franchise's 84th season of play and their 85th season overall. The Rangers celebrated 85 years since their establishment in 1926.

The New York Rangers 85th Anniversary logo

== Pre-season ==
After an off-season of speculation and rumors, the Rangers waived veteran defenseman Wade Redden on September 25. By waiving Redden, the Rangers were able to rid themselves of his large salary and have more flexibility to sign players under the current salary cap.

== Regular season ==
The Rangers won their first game of the season, on October 9 at Buffalo. Derek Stepan had a hat trick in the 6–3 win, becoming only the fourth player in NHL history to record a hat trick in his first career NHL game.

On November 12, 2010, the Rangers unveiled their 85th anniversary Heritage "third" jersey at an event at Rockefeller Center. The Rangers wore the jersey for a game for the first time on November 17 against the Boston Bruins.

Three Rangers participated in the 2011 NHL All-Star Game. Marc Staal and Henrik Lundqvist played in the main game, and rookie Derek Stepan took part in the SuperSkills Competition.

On April 4, 2011, the Rangers beat the Boston Bruins 5–3 after trailing in the game 3–0. According to the Versus broadcasters, this was the first time in franchise history that the Rangers were able to overcome a 3–0 deficit to the Bruins to win the game. The two teams had played each other 624 times since 1926.

The Rangers tied the Boston Bruins for the most shutouts for, with 11.

== Standings ==
=== Divisional standings ===
Atlantic Division
		GP	W	L	OTL	ROW	GF	GA	Pts
**1**	**Philadelphia Flyers**	**82**	**47**	**23**	**12**	**44**	**259**	**223**	**106**
**2**	**Pittsburgh Penguins**	**82**	**49**	**25**	**8**	**39**	**238**	**199**	**106**
**3**	**New York Rangers**	**82**	**44**	**33**	**5**	**35**	**233**	**198**	**93**
4	New Jersey Devils	82	38	39	5	35	174	209	81
5	New York Islanders	82	30	39	13	26	229	264	73

=== Conference standings ===
Eastern Conference
R		Div	GP	W	L	OTL	ROW	GF	GA	Pts
**1**	**z – Washington Capitals**	**SE**	**82**	**48**	**23**	**11**	**43**	**224**	**197**	107
**2**	**y – Philadelphia Flyers**	**AT**	**82**	**47**	**23**	**12**	**44**	**259**	**223**	106
**3**	**y – Boston Bruins**	**NE**	**82**	**46**	**25**	**11**	**44**	**246**	**195**	103
**4**	**Pittsburgh Penguins**	**AT**	**82**	**49**	**25**	**8**	**39**	**238**	**199**	106
**5**	**Tampa Bay Lightning**	**SE**	**82**	**46**	**25**	**11**	**40**	**247**	**240**	103
**6**	**Montreal Canadiens**	**NE**	**82**	**44**	**30**	**8**	**41**	**216**	**209**	96
**7**	**Buffalo Sabres**	**NE**	**82**	**43**	**29**	**10**	**38**	**245**	**229**	96
**8**	**New York Rangers**	**AT**	**82**	**44**	**33**	**5**	**35**	**233**	**198**	93
8.5
9	Carolina Hurricanes	SE	82	40	31	11	35	236	239	91
10	Toronto Maple Leafs	NE	82	37	34	11	32	218	251	85
11	New Jersey Devils	AT	82	38	39	5	35	174	209	81
12	Atlanta Thrashers	SE	82	34	36	12	29	223	269	80
13	Ottawa Senators	NE	82	32	40	10	30	192	250	74
14	New York Islanders	AT	82	30	39	13	26	229	264	73
15	Florida Panthers	SE	82	30	40	12	26	195	229	72

bold – qualified for playoffs; y – Won division; z – Placed first in conference (and division)
AT – Atlantic Division, NE – Northeast Division, SE – Southeast Division

== Schedule and results ==
=== Pre-season ===
2010 pre-season game log: 4–1–0 (home: 3–0–0; road: 1–1–0)
#	Date	Opponent	Score	Decision	Record
1	September 23	New Jersey Devils	4 – 3 OT	Johnson	1–0–0
2	September 25	@ New Jersey Devils	5 – 4 OT	Lundqvist	2–0–0
3	September 26	@ Detroit Red Wings	5 – 3	Johnson	2–1–0
4	September 29	Detroit Red Wings	5 – 1	Lundqvist	3–1–0
5	October 1	Ottawa Senators	5 – 4 SO	Lundqvist	4–1–0
6	October 2	@ Ottawa Senators	8 – 5	Biron	4–2–0

=== Regular season ===
2010-11 game log
October: 5-4-1 (Home: 1-3-1; Road: 4-1-0)

Game	October	Opponent	Score	Decision	Record
1	9	@ Buffalo Sabres	6 – 3	Lundqvist	1–0–0
2	11	@ New York Islanders	6 – 4	Lundqvist	1–1–0
3	15	Toronto Maple Leafs	4 – 3 OT	Lundqvist	1–1–1
4	18	Colorado Avalanche	3 – 1	Lundqvist	1–2–1
5	21	@ Toronto Maple Leafs	2 – 1	Biron	2–2–1
6	23	@ Boston Bruins	3 – 2	Lundqvist	3–2–1
7	24	New Jersey Devils	3 – 1	Lundqvist	4–2–1
8	27	Atlanta Thrashers	6 – 4	Biron	4–3–1
9	29	Carolina Hurricanes	4 – 3	Lundqvist	4–4–1
10	30	@ Toronto Maple Leafs	2 – 0	Lundqvist	5–4–1

November: 9-7-0 (Home: 4-4-0; Road: 5-3-0)

Game	November	Opponent	Score	Decision	Record
11	1	Chicago Blackhawks	4 – 2	Lundqvist	6–4–1
12	4	@ Philadelphia Flyers	4 – 1	Lundqvist	6–5–1
13	5	@ New Jersey Devils	3 – 0	Lundqvist	7–5–1
14	7	St. Louis Blues	2 – 0	Biron	7–6–1
15	9	Washington Capitals	5 – 3	Lundqvist	7–7–1
16	11	Buffalo Sabres	3 – 2 OT	Biron	8–7–1
17	14	Edmonton Oilers	8 – 2	Biron	9–7–1
18	15	@ Pittsburgh Penguins	3 – 2 OT	Lundqvist	10–7–1
19	17	Boston Bruins	3 – 2	Lundqvist	10–8–1
20	19	@ Colorado Avalanche	5 – 1	Lundqvist	10–9–1
21	20	@ Minnesota Wild	5 – 2	Biron	11–9–1
22	22	Calgary Flames	2 – 1	Biron	12–9–1
23	24	@ Tampa Bay Lightning	5 – 3	Lundqvist	12–10–1
24	26	@ Florida Panthers	3 – 0	Lundqvist	13–10–1
25	27	@ Nashville Predators	2 – 1 SO	Lundqvist	14–10–1
26	29	Pittsburgh Penguins	3 – 1	Lundqvist	14–11–1

December: 8-3-1 (Home: 4-1-1; Road: 4-2-0)

Game	December	Opponent	Score	Decision	Record
27	2	@ New York Islanders	6 – 5	Lundqvist	15–11–1
28	3	New York Islanders	2 – 0	Lundqvist	16–11–1
29	5	Ottawa Senators	3 – 1	Lundqvist	16–12–1
30	9	@ Ottawa Senators	5 – 3	Lundqvist	17–12–1
31	11	@ Columbus Blue Jackets	3 – 1	Lundqvist	17–13–1
32	12	Washington Capitals	7 – 0	Lundqvist	18–13–1
33	15	@ Pittsburgh Penguins	4 – 1	Lundqvist	19–13–1
34	16	Phoenix Coyotes	4 – 3 SO	Biron	20–13–1
35	18	@ Philadelphia Flyers	4 – 1	Lundqvist	20–14–1
36	23	Tampa Bay Lightning	4 – 3 SO	Lundqvist	20–14–2
37	27	New York Islanders	7 – 2	Lundqvist	21–14–2
38	29	@ New Jersey Devils	3 – 1	Lundqvist	22–14–2

January: 7-6-1 (Home: 3-3-0; Road: 4-3-1)

Game	January	Opponent	Score	Decision	Record
39	1	@ Tampa Bay Lightning	2 – 1 OT	Lundqvist	22–14–3
40	2	@ Florida Panthers	3 – 0	Lundqvist	22–15–3
41	5	Carolina Hurricanes	2 – 1 OT	Lundqvist	23–15–3
42	7	@ Dallas Stars	3 – 2 SO	Lundqvist	24–15–3
43	8	@ St. Louis Blues	2 – 1	Biron	25–15–3
44	11	Montreal Canadiens	2 – 1	Lundqvist	25–16–3
45	13	Vancouver Canucks	1 – 0	Lundqvist	26–16–3
46	15	@ Montreal Canadiens	3 – 2	Lundqvist	26–17–3
47	16	Philadelphia Flyers	3 – 2	Biron	26–18–3
48	19	Toronto Maple Leafs	7 – 0	Lundqvist	27–18–3
49	20	@ Carolina Hurricanes	4 – 1	Lundqvist	27–19–3
50	22	@ Atlanta Thrashers	3 – 2 SO	Lundqvist	28–19–3
51	24	@ Washington Capitals	2 – 1 SO	Biron	29–19–3
52	25	Florida Panthers	4 – 3	Lundqvist	29–20–3

February: 4-7-1 (Home: 2-3-1; Road: 2-4-0)

Game	February	Opponent	Score	Decision	Record
53	1	Pittsburgh Penguins	4 – 3 SO	Lundqvist	29–20–4
54	3	New Jersey Devils	3 – 2	Lundqvist	29–21–4
55	5	@ Montreal Canadiens	2 – 0	Biron	29–22–4
56	7	@ Detroit Red Wings	3 – 2	Biron	29–23–4
57	11	@ Atlanta Thrashers	3 – 2	Lundqvist	29–24–4
58	13	Pittsburgh Penguins	5 – 3	Lundqvist	30–24–4
59	17	Los Angeles Kings	4 – 3 SO	Lundqvist	31–24–4
60	18	@ New Jersey Devils	1 – 0	Lundqvist	31–25–4
61	20	Philadelphia Flyers	4 – 2	Lundqvist	31–26–4
62	22	@ Carolina Hurricanes	4 – 3 SO	Lundqvist	32–26–4
63	25	@ Washington Capitals	6 – 0	Lundqvist	33–26–4
64	27	Tampa Bay Lightning	2 – 1	Lundqvist	33–27–4

March: 8-5-1 (Home: 4-2-1; Road: 4-3-0)

Game	March	Opponent	Score	Decision	Record
65	1	Buffalo Sabres	3 – 2	Lundqvist	33–28–4
66	3	Minnesota Wild	3 – 1	Lundqvist	33–29–4
67	4	@ Ottawa Senators	4 – 1	Lundqvist	34–29–4
68	6	Philadelphia Flyers	7 – 0	Lundqvist	35–29–4
69	9	@ Anaheim Ducks	5 – 2	Lundqvist	35–30–4
70	12	@ San Jose Sharks	3 – 2 SO	Lundqvist	36–30–4
71	15	New York Islanders	6 – 3	Lundqvist	37–30–4
72	18	Montreal Canadiens	6 – 3	Lundqvist	38–30–4
73	20	@ Pittsburgh Penguins	5 – 2	Lundqvist	39–30–4
74	22	Florida Panthers	1 – 0	Lundqvist	40–30–4
75	24	Ottawa Senators	2 – 1 SO	Lundqvist	40–30–5
76	26	@ Boston Bruins	1 – 0	Lundqvist	41–30–5
77	30	@ Buffalo Sabres	1 – 0	Lundqvist	41–31–5
78	31	@ New York Islanders	6 – 2	Lundqvist	41–32–5

April: 3-1-0 (Home: 2-1-0; Road: 1-0-0)

Game	April	Opponent	Score	Decision	Record
79	3	@ Philadelphia Flyers	3 – 2 SO	Lundqvist	42–32–5
80	4	Boston Bruins	5 – 3	Lundqvist	43–32–5
81	7	Atlanta Thrashers	3 – 0	Lundqvist	43–33–5
82	9	New Jersey Devils	5 – 2	Lundqvist	44–33–5

== Playoffs ==
For the second straight season, the Rangers playoff hopes came down to the final game of the regular season. The Rangers defeated the Devils 5–2 on the afternoon of April 9, 2011 and then had to wait for the result of the Carolina Hurricanes vs. Tampa Bay Lightning game that night. The Lightning defeated the Hurricanes 6–2, securing the Rangers spot in the playoffs. (Both the New York Islanders and the New Jersey Devils missed the 2011 playoffs; had the Rangers also failed to qualify, it would have marked the first time since 1966 that the Stanley Cup playoffs did not feature a club from the New York metro area.) The Rangers qualified for the playoffs, after missing the playoffs last season for the first time since the lockout, as the #8 seed. They were defeated by the #1 seeded Washington Capitals in the first round.

Key: Win Loss

2011 Stanley Cup playoffs

Eastern Conference Quarter-finals: vs. (1) Washington Capitals – Washington wins series 4-1
#	Date	Visitor	Score	Home	OT	Decision	Series
1	April 13	New York Rangers	1 – 2	Washington Capitals	OT	Lundqvist	Washington leads series 1-0
2	April 15	New York Rangers	0 – 2	Washington Capitals		Lundqvist	Washington leads series 2-0
3	April 17	Washington Capitals	2 – 3	New York Rangers		Lundqvist	Washington leads series 2-1
4	April 20	Washington Capitals	4 – 3	New York Rangers	2OT	Lundqvist	Washington leads series 3-1
5	April 23	New York Rangers	1 – 3	Washington Capitals		Lundqvist	Washington wins series 4-1

== Player statistics ==
Skaters

Regular season
Player	GP	G	A	Pts	+/-	PIM
Brandon Dubinsky	77	24	30	54	-3	100
Marian Gaborik	62	22	26	48	8	18
Ryan Callahan	60	23	25	48	-7	46
Derek Stepan	82	21	24	45	8	20
Artem Anisimov	82	18	26	44	3	20
Brian Boyle	82	21	14	35	2	74
Daniel Girardi	80	4	27	31	7	37
Brandon Prust	82	13	16	29	2	160
Marc Staal	77	7	22	29	8	50
Erik Christensen	63	11	16	27	3	18
Ruslan Fedotenko	66	10	15	25	9	25
Sean Avery	76	3	21	24	-4	174
Vaclav Prospal	29	9	14	23	4	8
Mats Zuccarello	42	6	17	23	3	4
Wojtek Wolski^{†}	37	6	13	19	12	8
Alexander Frolov	43	7	9	16	4	8
Michael Sauer	76	3	12	15	20	75
Michal Rozsival^{‡}	32	3	12	15	3	22
Michael Del Zotto	47	2	9	11	-5	20
Matt Gilroy	58	3	8	11	5	14
Ryan McDonagh	40	1	8	9	16	14
Steve Eminger	65	2	4	6	-5	22
Bryan McCabe^{†}	19	2	4	6	-1	6
Chris Drury	24	1	4	5	2	8
Derek Boogaard	22	1	1	2	0	45
Todd White	18	1	1	2	-2	2
Kris Newbury	11	0	1	1	-1	35
Chad Kolarik	4	0	1	1	-1	2
Jeremy Williams	1	0	0	0	0	0
Brodie Dupont	1	0	0	0	0	0
Evgeny Grachev	8	0	0	0	-3	0
Dale Weise	10	0	0	0	-1	19

Playoffs
Player	GP	G	A	Pts	+/-	PIM
Wojtek Wolski	5	1	2	3	0	0
Brandon Dubinsky	5	2	1	3	-3	2
Bryan McCabe	5	0	2	2	0	14
Ruslan Fedotenko	5	0	2	2	-1	4
Marian Gaborik	5	1	1	2	0	2
Vaclav Prospal	5	1	0	1	1	0
Chris Drury	5	0	1	1	0	2
Sean Avery	4	0	1	1	-1	12
Erik Christensen	5	1	0	1	0	2
Brandon Prust	5	0	1	1	0	4
Marc Staal	5	0	1	1	-3	0
Michael Sauer	5	0	1	1	-1	0
Artem Anisimov	5	1	0	1	2	0
Matt Gilroy	5	1	0	1	-1	2
Mats Zuccarello	1	0	0	0	0	2
Brian Boyle	5	0	0	0	-1	6
Daniel Girardi	5	0	0	0	-2	0
Ryan McDonagh	5	0	0	0	0	4
Derek Stepan	5	0	0	0	-5	2

Goaltenders

Regular season
Player	GP	TOI	W	L	OT	GA	GAA	SA	SV%	SO	G	A	PIM
Henrik Lundqvist	68	4007	36	27	5	152	2.28	1965	.923	11	0	4	6
Martin Biron	17	928	8	6	0	33	2.13	426	.923	0	0	0	0
Chad Johnson	1	20	0	0	0	2	6.00	11	.818	0	0	0	0

Playoffs
Player	GP	TOI	W	L	GA	GAA	SA	SV%	SO	G	A	PIM
Henrik Lundqvist	5	346	1	4	13	2.25	156	.917	0	0	0	0

^{†}Denotes player spent time with another team before joining Rangers. Stats reflect time with Rangers only.
^{‡}Traded mid-season. Stats reflect time with Rangers only.

== Awards and records ==
=== Awards ===
Regular season
Player	Award	Awarded
Henrik Lundqvist	NHL Third Star of the Week	March 28, 2011
Brandon Prust	Steven McDonald Extra Effort Award	April 7, 2011
Henrik Lundqvist	Rangers' MVP (voted by New York Rangers media)	April 7, 2011
Ryan Callahan	Players' Player Award (voted by Ranger players)	April 7, 2011
Ryan Callahan	John Halligan Good Guy Award (voted by the NY chapter of the PHWA)	April 7, 2011

=== Records ===
With a 6–3 win over the Montreal Canadiens on March 18, 2011, Henrik Lundqvist became the first goalie in NHL history to record 30 wins or more in each of his first six seasons.

=== Milestones ===
Regular season
Player	Milestone	Reached
Derek Stepan	First Career NHL Game; First Career NHL Goal; First Career NHL Point; First Career NHL Hat-trick	October 9, 2010
Derek Stepan	First Career NHL Assist	October 18, 2010
Ryan Callahan	100th Career NHL Point	October 23, 2010
Michael Sauer	First Career NHL Assist; First Career NHL Point	October 23, 2010
Evgeny Grachev	1st Career NHL Game	October 29, 2010
Henrik Lundqvist	25th Career NHL Shutout	October 30, 2010
Sean Avery	500th Career NHL Game	November 1, 2010
Artem Anisimov	100th Career NHL Game	November 14, 2010
Michael Del Zotto	100th Career NHL Game	November 19, 2010
Daniel Girardi	300th Career NHL Game	November 19, 2010
Ruslan Fedotenko	700th Career NHL Game	November 24, 2010
Erik Christensen	300th Career NHL Game	November 29, 2010
Michael Sauer	1st Career NHL Goal	December 9, 2010
Marian Gaborik	600th Career NHL Game	December 18, 2010
Dale Weise	1st Career NHL Game	December 18, 2010
Mats Zuccarello	1st Career NHL Game	December 23, 2010
Mats Zuccarello	1st Career NHL Assist; 1st Career NHL Point	December 27, 2010
Daniel Girardi	100th Career NHL Point	January 1, 2011
Mats Zuccarello	1st Career NHL Goal	January 5, 2011
Ryan McDonagh	1st Career NHL Game	January 7, 2011
Matt Gilroy	100th Career NHL Game	January 16, 2011
Chad Kolarik	1st Career NHL Assist; 1st Career NHL Point	January 20, 2011
Ryan McDonagh	1st Career NHL Assist; 1st Career NHL Point	January 20, 2011
Brodie Dupont	1st Career NHL Game	January 22, 2011
Brandon Dubinsky	100th Career NHL Assist	February 1, 2011
Marc Staal	300th Career NHL Game	February 7, 2011
Henrik Lundqvist	200th Career NHL Win	February 17, 2011
Brandon Dubinsky	300th Career NHL Game	March 3, 2011
Steve Eminger	400th Career NHL Game	March 4, 2011
Ryan Callahan	1st Career NHL Hat-trick	March 6, 2011
Henrik Lundqvist	400th Career NHL Game	March 26, 2011
Ryan McDonagh	1st Career NHL Goal	April 9, 2011

Playoffs
Player	Milestone	Reached
Brian Boyle	1st Career NHL Playoff Game	April 13, 2011
Matt Gilroy	1st Career NHL Playoff Game; 1st Career NHL Playoff Goal; 1st Career NHL Playoff Point	April 13, 2011
Ryan McDonagh	1st Career NHL Playoff Game	April 13, 2011
Brandon Prust	1st Career NHL Playoff Game; 1st Career NHL Playoff Assist; 1st Career NHL Playoff Point	April 13, 2011
Michael Sauer	1st Career NHL Playoff Game	April 13, 2011
Derek Stepan	1st Career NHL Playoff Game	April 13, 2011
Mats Zuccarello	1st Career NHL Playoff Game	April 13, 2011
Erik Christensen	1st Career NHL Playoff Goal	April 17, 2011
Artem Anisimov	1st Career NHL Playoff Goal; 1st Career NHL Playoff Point	April 20, 2011
Michael Sauer	1st Career NHL Playoff Assist; 1st Career NHL Playoff Point	April 20, 2011

== Transactions ==
The Rangers have been involved in the following transactions during the 2010–11 season.

=== Trades ===
Date	Details
May 25, 2010	To New York Islanders 6th-round pick in 2010	To New York Rangers Jyri Niemi
June 26, 2010	To Carolina Hurricanes Bobby Sanguinetti	To New York Rangers 6th-round pick in 2010; 2nd-round pick in 2011
July 9, 2010	To Anaheim Ducks Aaron Voros; Ryan Hillier	To New York Rangers Steve Eminger
July 19, 2010	To Anaheim Ducks Tomas Zaborsky	To New York Rangers Matt McCue
August 2, 2010	To Atlanta Thrashers Donald Brashear; Patrick Rissmiller	To New York Rangers Todd White
November 11, 2010	To Columbus Blue Jackets Dane Byers	To New York Rangers Chad Kolarik
November 23, 2010	To Anaheim Ducks Nigel Williams	To New York Rangers Stu Bickel
January 10, 2011	To Phoenix Coyotes Michal Rozsíval	To New York Rangers Wojtek Wolski
February 26, 2011	To Florida Panthers Tim Kennedy; 3rd-round pick in 2011	To New York Rangers Bryan McCabe
February 28, 2011	To Toronto Maple Leafs 7th-round pick in 2012	To New York Rangers John Mitchell

=== Free agents acquired ===
Player	Former team	Contract terms
Mats Zuccarello	Modo Hockey	2 years, $1.8 million
Martin Biron	New York Islanders	2 years, $1.75 million
Derek Boogaard	Minnesota Wild	4 years, $6.5 million
Jeremy Williams	Grand Rapids Griffins	1 year, $515,000
Alexander Frolov	Los Angeles Kings	1 year, $3 million
Tim Kennedy	Buffalo Sabres	1 year, $550,000
Ruslan Fedotenko	Pittsburgh Penguins	1 year, $1 million
Jason Missiaen	Baie-Comeau Drakkar	3 years, $2.025 million entry-level contract
Tommy Grant	University of Alaska Anchorage	2 years, $1.25 million

=== Free agents lost ===
Player	New team	Contract terms
Ilkka Heikkinen	Sibir Novosibirsk	1 year
P. A. Parenteau	New York Islanders	1 year, $600,000
Jody Shelley	Philadelphia Flyers	3 years, $3.3 million
Alex Auld	Montreal Canadiens	1 year, $1 million
Olli Jokinen	Calgary Flames	2 years, $6 million
Corey Locke	Ottawa Senators	2 years, $1.1 million
Corey Potter	Pittsburgh Penguins	1 year, $500,000
Steve Valiquette	CSKA Moscow	1 year
Matt Zaba	Bolzano-Bozen Foxes	undisclosed
Enver Lisin	Magnitogorsk Metallurg	2 years

=== Claimed via waivers ===
Player	Former team	Date claimed off waivers

=== Lost via waivers ===
Player	New team	Date claimed off waivers

=== Lost via retirement ===
Player

=== Player signings ===
Player	Contract terms
Jyri Niemi	3 years, $1.86 million entry-level contract
Dane Byers	1 year, $500,000
Kris Newbury	2 years, $1.025 million
Derek Stepan	3 years, $2.4625 million entry-level contract
Erik Christensen	2 years, $1.85 million
Vaclav Prospal	1 year, $2.1 million
Brandon Prust	2 years, $1.6 million
Ryan McDonagh	3 years, $3.9 million entry-level contract
Daniel Girardi	4 years, $13.3 million
Brodie Dupont	1 year, $500,000
Michael Sauer	1 year, $500,000
Marc Staal	5 years, $19.875 million
Ryan Bourque	3 years, $1.97 million entry-level contract
Dylan McIlrath	3 years, $2.2 million entry-level contract
Carl Hagelin	2 years, $1.325 million entry-level contract
Roman Horak	3 years, $1.83 million entry-level contract

== Draft picks ==
New York's picks at the 2010 NHL entry draft in Los Angeles.

Round	#	Player	Position	Nationality	College/Junior/Club team (League)
1	10	Dylan McIlrath	D	Canada	Moose Jaw Warriors (WHL)
2	40	Christian Thomas	RW	Canada	Oshawa Generals (OHL)
4	100	Andrew Yogan	C/LW	United States	Erie Otters (OHL)
5	130	Jason Wilson	RW	Canada	Owen Sound Attack (OHL)
6	157 (from Carolina)	Jesper Fast	RW	Sweden	HV71 Jr. (J20 SuperElit)
7	190	Randy McNaught	F	Canada	Saskatoon Blades (WHL)

== See also ==
- 2010–11 NHL season

== Farm teams ==
=== Hartford Wolf Pack / Connecticut Whale (AHL) ===
The 2010–11 season will be the 14th season of AHL hockey for the franchise. The Hartford Wolf Pack became the Connecticut Whale on November 27, 2010.

=== Greenville Road Warriors (ECHL) ===
The 2010–11 season will be the 1st season of affiliation for the Rangers and the Road Warriors.
