= Shane Sims =

American ice hockey player (born 1988)

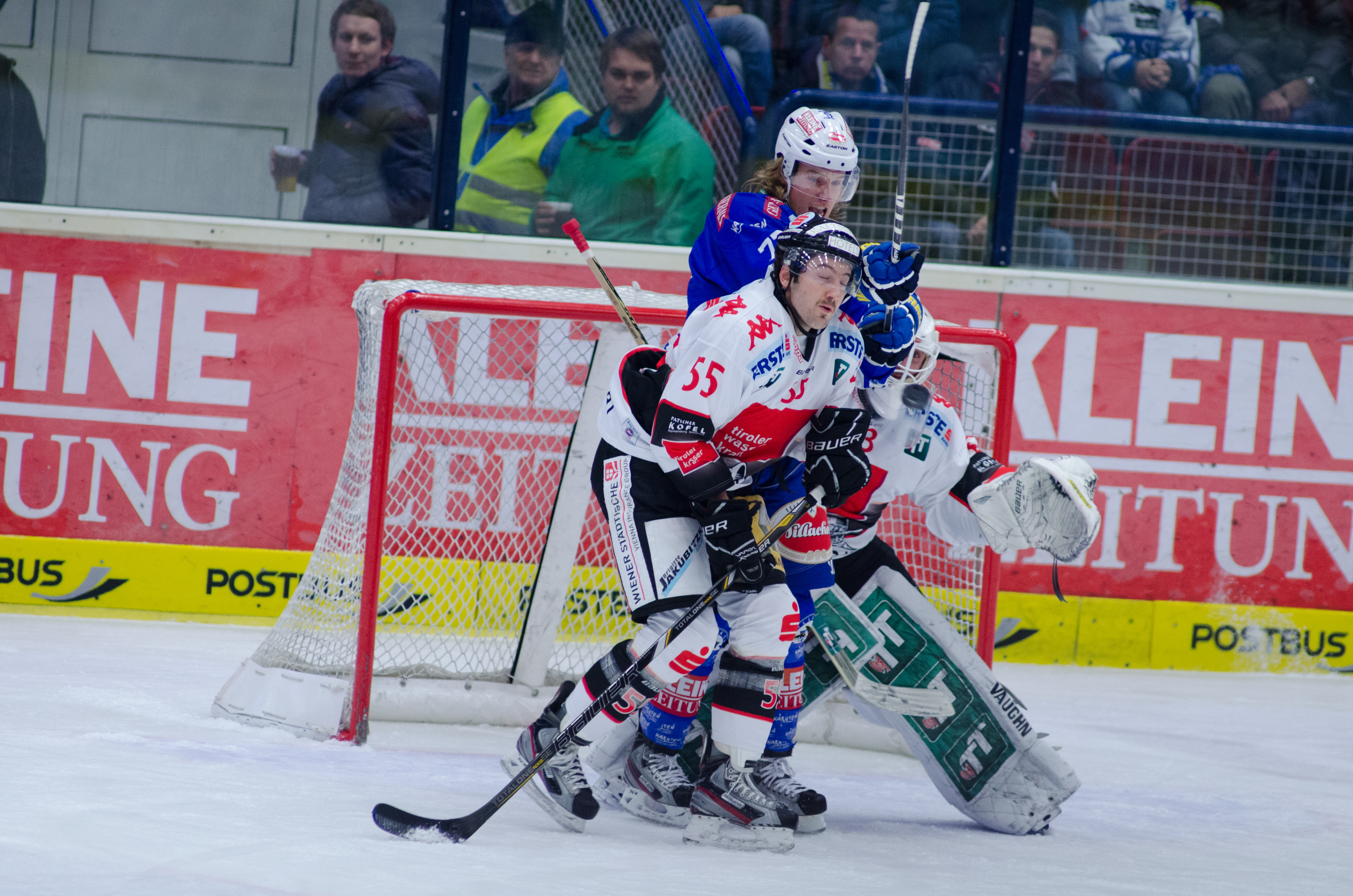
- Born: April 30, 1988 (age 38) East Amherst, New York, U.S.
- Height: 6 ft 1 in (185 cm)
- Weight: 196 lb (89 kg; 14 st 0 lb)
- Position: Defense
- Shot: Right
- Played for: New York Islanders; Aalborg Pirates; HC TWK Innsbruck; HC Gherdëina
- NHL draft: 126th overall, 2006; New York Islanders
- Playing career: 2011–2016

Shane Sims (born April 30, 1988) is an American former professional ice hockey defenseman who played one game in the National Hockey League (NHL) for the New York Islanders.

== Playing career ==
Sims attended Ohio State University. Sims was drafted 126th overall by the New York Islanders in the 2006 NHL entry draft. On April 9, 2011 he signed a one-day NHL regular season amateur tryout agreement. On April 9, 2011, Sims made his NHL debut as he appeared in the final game of the 2010–2011 season against the Philadelphia Flyers.

After two seasons abroad in Denmark and Austria, with Aalborg Pirates and HC TWK Innsbruck respectively, Sims returned to North America as a free agent to sign a one-year contract with the Toledo Walleye of the ECHL on September 22, 2014.

On August 4, 2015, Sims returned to Europe in agreeing to a one-year contract to end his career with Italian club, HC Gherdëina of the Serie A.

== Career statistics ==
			Regular season					Playoffs
Season	Team	League	GP	G	A	Pts	PIM	GP	G	A	Pts	PIM
2004–05	Buffalo Lightning	OPJHL	43	14	26	40	47	—	—	—	—	—
2005–06	Des Moines Buccaneers	USHL	59	10	12	22	80	11	2	0	2	12
2006–07	Des Moines Buccaneers	USHL	59	10	19	29	137	8	1	3	4	8
2007–08	Ohio State University	CCHA	39	1	10	11	45	—	—	—	—	—
2008–09	Ohio State University	CCHA	42	7	17	24	42	—	—	—	—	—
2009–10	Ohio State University	CCHA	34	5	12	17	22	—	—	—	—	—
2010–11	Ohio State University	CCHA	37	3	16	19	24	—	—	—	—	—
2010–11	New York Islanders	NHL	1	0	0	0	0	—	—	—	—	—
2011–12	Gwinnett Gladiators	ECHL	47	5	13	18	35	1	0	0	0	0
2012–13	Aalborg Pirates	DEN	39	8	13	21	28	7	2	1	3	6
2013–14	HC TWK Innsbruck	AUT	47	1	9	10	28	—	—	—	—	—
2014–15	Toledo Walleye	ECHL	65	7	24	31	43	21	0	6	6	10
2015–16	HC Gherdëina	ITA	40	6	15	21	50	5	0	5	5	4
ECHL totals			112	12	37	49	78	22	0	6	6	10
NHL totals			1	0	0	0	0	—	—	—	—	—

== Awards and honours ==
Award	Year
USHL
Clark Cup (Des Moines Buccaneers)	2006
