= Jamie Doornbosch =

Canadian ice hockey player

- Born: February 1, 1990 (age 36) Scarborough, Ontario, Canada
- Height: 6 ft 2 in (188 cm)
- Weight: 190 lb (86 kg; 13 st 8 lb)
- Position: Defence
- Shot: Left
- Played for: New York Islanders
- NHL draft: Undrafted
- Playing career: 2011–2018

Jamie Doornbosch (born February 1, 1990) is a Canadian former professional ice hockey defenceman. He played one game in the National Hockey League (NHL) for the New York Islanders during the 2010–11 season.

== Playing career ==
=== Junior ===
Doornbosch began his junior career with the Peterborough Petes of the OHL, as he was drafted by Peterborough in the fourth round of the 2006 OHL Priority Draft. Doornbosch pointless in four games with the Petes during the 2006–07 season. He played his first full season with the Petes in 2007–08, scoring two goals and 12 points in 60 games, before he added an assist in five playoff games. Doornbosch saw his numbers improve in the 2008–09 season with Peterborough, as he had eight goals and 37 points, which were the most by any Petes defenceman that season. In four playoff games, Doornsbosch had no points. Doornbosch saw his number improve once again in the 2009–10, as he had 12 goals and 50 points, once again team highs by a Petes defenceman, and fourth in overall team scoring. In four playoff games, Doornbosch had an assist. During the off-season, the Petes traded Doornbosch and a 15th round draft pick in the 2012 OHL Priority Draft to the Kitchener Rangers for the Rangers 13th round pick in 2012, and the Rangers fourth round pick in 2014.

Doornbosch spent his overage season with the Kitchener Rangers in 2010–11. In 68 games with the Rangers, he had a career high 19 goals, and 48 points, which placed him second on team scoring among defencemen. In seven playoff games, Doornbosch had a goal and two points.

=== Professional ===
Nearing the conclusion of his junior career with the Rangers, the New York Islanders signed Doornbosch to an NHL regular season amateur tryout agreement on April 8, 2011. He appeared in one game with the team, that night against the Pittsburgh Penguins, and had no points and a -1 rating in just over five minutes of ice time.

Choosing not to sign another pro contract, Doornbosch returned to the amateur ranks the next year, attending Saint Mary's University in Halifax, Nova Scotia, playing with their ice hockey team, the Huskies. In his first season in CIS hockey, Doornbosch scored one goal and added 13 assists in 24 games. He also amassed 70 penalty minutes.

Upon completing his full five-year collegiate career, Doornbosch played 3 games with Eisipogtog Hawks in the NESHL before he returned to the pro ranks in agreeing to a contract with the Wichita Thunder of the ECHL midway through the 2016–17 season on December 7, 2016.

Doornbosch returned to the Thunder for the 2017–18 season, and after 17 games he was traded to the Brampton Beast on December 27, 2017. After spending brief stints with the Bakersfield Condors and the Belleville Senators, Doornbosch continued to play in the ECHL with the Beast, registering 14 points in 26 games. On March 8, 2018, Doornbosch was traded for a second time within the season to the Toledo Walleye in exchange for Erik Bradford. However, Doornbosch opted not to report to the Walleye, choosing to end his professional career to pursue other opportunities on March 12, 2018.

== Career statistics ==
			Regular season					Playoffs
Season	Team	League	GP	G	A	Pts	PIM	GP	G	A	Pts	PIM
2006–07	Markham Waxers	OPJHL	1	0	0	0	0	—	—	—	—	—
2006–07	Peterborough Petes	OHL	4	0	0	0	0	—	—	—	—	—
2007–08	Peterborough Petes	OHL	60	2	10	12	53	5	0	1	1	2
2008–09	Peterborough Petes	OHL	64	8	29	37	60	4	0	0	0	2
2009–10	Peterborough Petes	OHL	68	12	38	50	52	4	0	1	1	6
2010–11	Kitchener Rangers	OHL	68	19	29	48	44	7	1	1	2	8
2010–11	New York Islanders	NHL	1	0	0	0	0	—	—	—	—	—
2011–12	Saint Mary's Huskies	CIS	28	1	13	14	70	4	0	0	0	6
2012–13	Saint Mary's Huskies	CIS	28	1	12	13	32	7	0	2	2	6
2013–14	Saint Mary's Huskies	CIS	28	8	13	21	60	—	—	—	—	—
2014–15	Saint Mary's Huskies	CIS	26	2	13	15	63	8	1	1	2	6
2015–16	Saint Mary's Huskies	CIS	23	5	16	21	22	—	—	—	—	—
2016–17	Wichita Thunder	ECHL	44	10	20	30	32	—	—	—	—	—
2016–17	Binghamton Senators	AHL	8	0	0	0	0	—	—	—	—	—
2017–18	Wichita Thunder	ECHL	17	1	7	8	12	—	—	—	—	—
2017–18	Bakersfield Condors	AHL	2	0	1	1	0	—	—	—	—	—
2017–18	Belleville Senators	AHL	4	0	1	1	2	—	—	—	—	—
2017–18	Brampton Beast	ECHL	26	2	12	14	12	—	—	—	—	—
NHL totals			1	0	0	0	0	—	—	—	—	—

== See also ==
- List of players who played only one game in the NHL
