= Chris Conner =

American ice hockey player (born 1983)

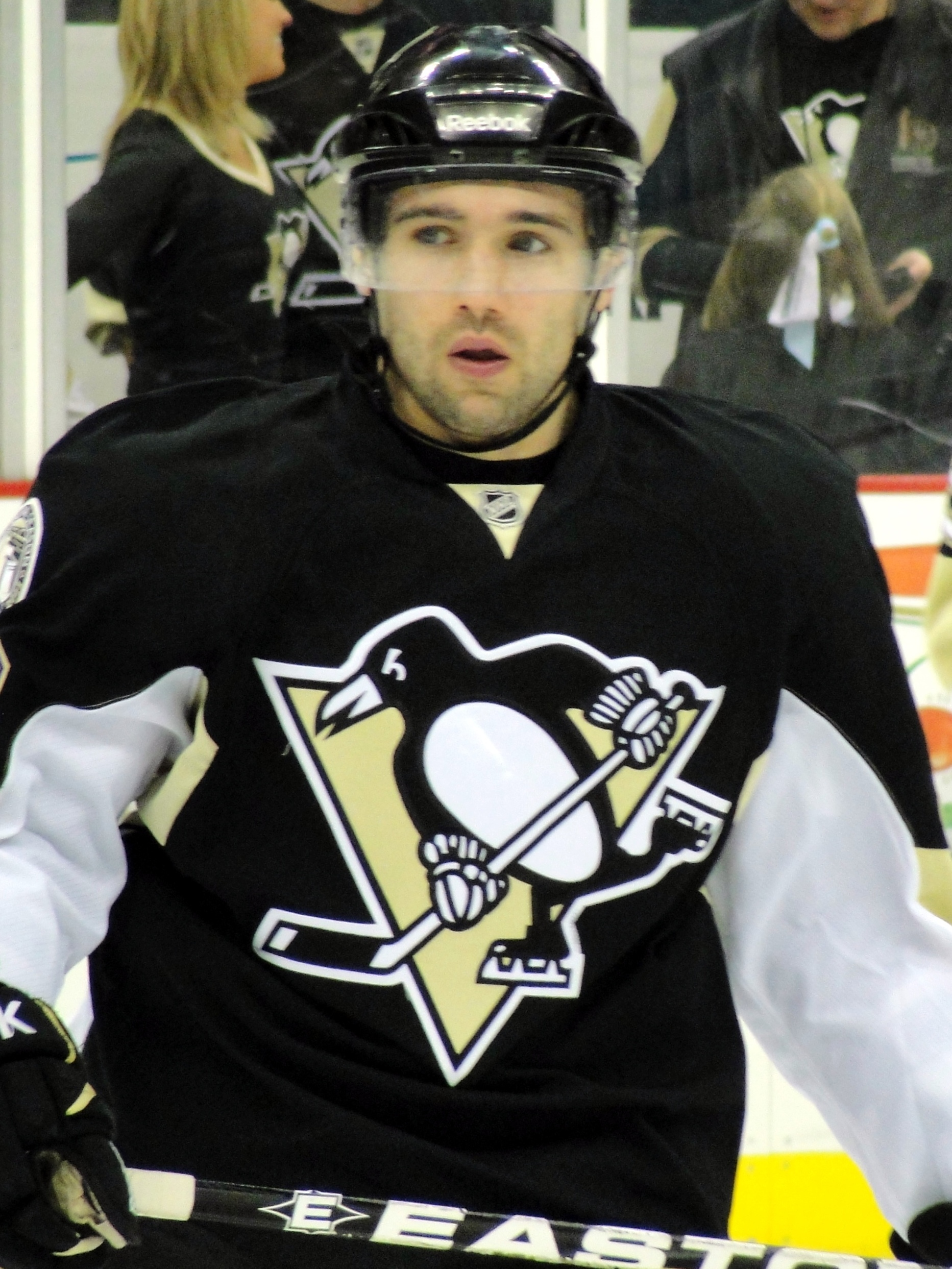
- Conner with the Penguins in 2011.
- Born: December 23, 1983 (age 42) Westland, Michigan, U.S.
- Height: 5 ft 8 in (173 cm)
- Weight: 180 lb (82 kg; 12 st 12 lb)
- Position: Winger
- Shot: Left
- Played for: Dallas Stars; Pittsburgh Penguins; Detroit Red Wings; Phoenix Coyotes; Washington Capitals
- NHL draft: Undrafted
- Playing career: 2006–2020

Christopher Ryan Conner (born December 23, 1983) is an American former professional ice hockey winger who played in the National Hockey League (NHL).

== Early life ==
Conner grew up in Westland, Michigan and attended Churchill High School in Livonia, Michigan. He lived in the same neighbourhood as current Anaheim Ducks forward Ryan Kesler, and the two grew up together playing hockey since childhood. As a youth, he played in the 1997 Quebec International Pee-Wee Hockey Tournament with the Detroit Little Caesars minor ice hockey team.

== Playing career ==
Undrafted, Chris Conner played four seasons of collegiate hockey for Michigan Tech of the WCHA from 2002 to 2006. One of his teammates there was John Scott, who would also play in the NHL. After his senior year, Conner made his professional debut with the Iowa Stars of the AHL at the end of the 2005–06 season.

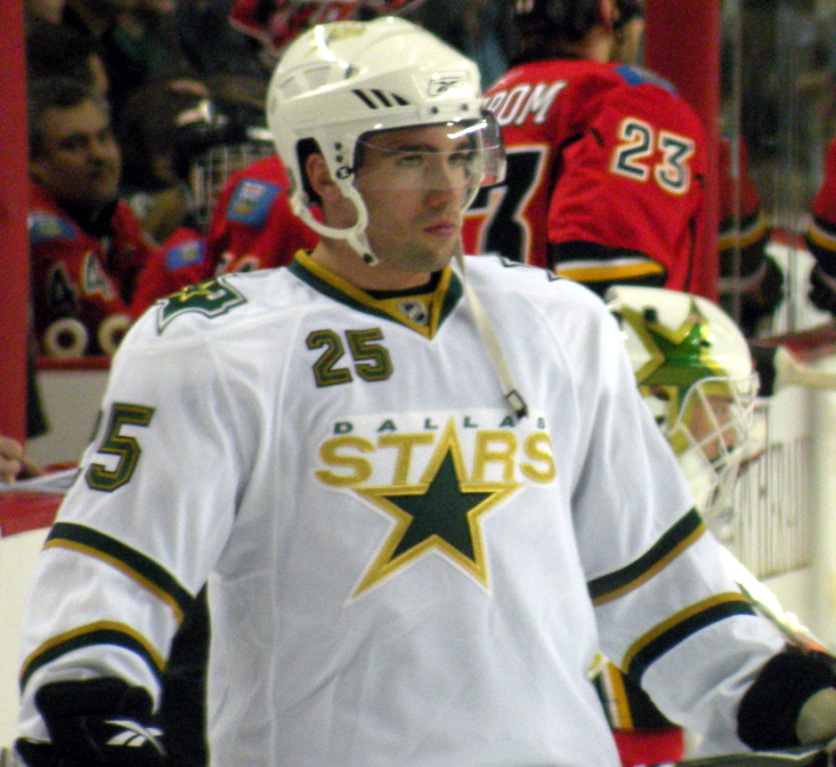
Chris Conner with the Dallas Stars.

On July 13, 2006, Conner signed as a free agent to a two-year contract with the Dallas Stars. Conner was then assigned to affiliate Iowa for the start of the 2006–07 season, but upon being recalled, scored his first NHL goal during a game against the Colorado Avalanche on December 27, 2006. Conner was re-signed by the Stars at the end of the 2007–08 season to a one-year deal on March 12, 2008.

After splitting the 2008–09 season between the Stars and the Peoria Rivermen, Conner signed a one-year deal with Pittsburgh Penguins on July 7, 2009. Conner appeared in 60 games during the 2010–11 NHL season with Pittsburgh, scoring seven goals with nine assists. He scored the Penguins second goal in an 8–2 loss in Game 5 of Pittsburgh's first-round series against the Tampa Bay Lightning. Conner failed to convert on a penalty shot during the second period of the next game, losing the puck off his stick as he advanced towards Lightning goaltender Dwayne Roloson. Pittsburgh ultimately lost the series in seven games.

On July 7, 2011, Conner signed a one-year, two-way contract with the Detroit Red Wings.

In the following 2012–13 season, Conner signed with the Phoenix Coyotes on a one-year contract. With the lockout in effect, he was directly assigned to the AHL affiliate, the Portland Pirates. He was recalled by the Coyotes to help their playoff push, appearing in 12 games to score 2 points, before being returned to Portland before the end of their season.

On July 5, 2013, Conner signed a one-year, two-way contract to return with the Pittsburgh Penguins that was to pay him $550,000 at the NHL level.

On July 1, 2014, Conner continued his journeyman career in signing a one-year two-way contract with the Washington Capitals. A year later Conner signed a two-year, two-way contract with the Philadelphia Flyers. He led the scoring in the Flyers' AHL affiliate Lehigh Valley Phantoms during the 2015-16 season with 55 points.

As a free agent following the completion of his contract with the Flyers, Conner opted to continue his tenure with the Phantoms in agreeing to a two-year AHL deal on July 6, 2017.

After four seasons with the Phantoms, Conner left the club as a free agent, continuing in the AHL in securing a one-year contract with the Binghamton Devils, affiliate to the New Jersey Devils, on July 17, 2019.

== Career statistics ==
			Regular season					Playoffs
Season	Team	League	GP	G	A	Pts	PIM	GP	G	A	Pts	PIM
2000–01	Chicago Freeze	NAHL	56	17	28	45	18	—	—	—	—	—
2001–02	Chicago Freeze	NAHL	30	18	15	33	30	—	—	—	—	—
2001–02	Compuware Ambassadors	NAHL	19	4	9	13	23	—	—	—	—	—
2002–03	Michigan Tech	WCHA	38	13	24	37	8	—	—	—	—	—
2003–04	Michigan Tech	WCHA	38	25	14	39	12	—	—	—	—	—
2004–05	Michigan Tech	WCHA	37	14	10	24	6	—	—	—	—	—
2005–06	Michigan Tech	WCHA	38	17	12	29	18	—	—	—	—	—
2005–06	Iowa Stars	AHL	15	2	3	5	0	7	1	1	2	2
2006–07	Iowa Stars	AHL	48	19	18	37	24	12	2	5	7	2
2006–07	Dallas Stars	NHL	11	1	2	3	4	—	—	—	—	—
2007–08	Iowa Stars	AHL	55	13	26	39	17	—	—	—	—	—
2007–08	Dallas Stars	NHL	22	3	2	5	6	1	0	0	0	0
2008–09	Peoria Rivermen	AHL	30	16	12	28	10	—	—	—	—	—
2008–09	Dallas Stars	NHL	38	3	10	13	10	—	—	—	—	—
2009–10	Wilkes-Barre/Scranton Penguins	AHL	59	19	37	56	21	4	2	2	4	2
2009–10	Pittsburgh Penguins	NHL	8	2	1	3	0	1	0	0	0	0
2010–11	Wilkes-Barre/Scranton Penguins	AHL	11	3	6	9	2	—	—	—	—	—
2010–11	Pittsburgh Penguins	NHL	60	7	9	16	10	7	1	0	1	0
2011–12	Grand Rapids Griffins	AHL	57	16	37	53	22	—	—	—	—	—
2011–12	Detroit Red Wings	NHL	8	1	2	3	0	—	—	—	—	—
2012–13	Portland Pirates	AHL	60	13	27	40	28	1	0	1	1	2
2012–13	Phoenix Coyotes	NHL	12	1	1	2	2	—	—	—	—	—
2013–14	Wilkes-Barre/Scranton Penguins	AHL	17	6	5	11	8	—	—	—	—	—
2013–14	Pittsburgh Penguins	NHL	19	4	1	5	2	—	—	—	—	—
2014–15	Hershey Bears	AHL	61	19	33	52	10	10	2	5	7	2
2014–15	Washington Capitals	NHL	2	0	0	0	4	—	—	—	—	—
2015–16	Lehigh Valley Phantoms	AHL	58	16	39	55	14	—	—	—	—	—
2016–17	Lehigh Valley Phantoms	AHL	70	22	34	56	10	5	1	3	4	2
2017–18	Lehigh Valley Phantoms	AHL	65	17	20	37	22	13	5	4	9	0
2018–19	Lehigh Valley Phantoms	AHL	72	16	35	51	16	—	—	—	—	—
2019–20	Binghamton Devils	AHL	53	12	18	30	6	—	—	—	—	—
2022	Team Carbonneau	3ICE	6	0	3	3	—	—	—	—	—	—
NHL totals			180	22	28	50	38	9	1	0	1	0

== Awards and honors ==
Award	Year
All-WCHA Second Team	2003–04
