= Mark Letestu =

Canadian ice hockey player (born 1985)

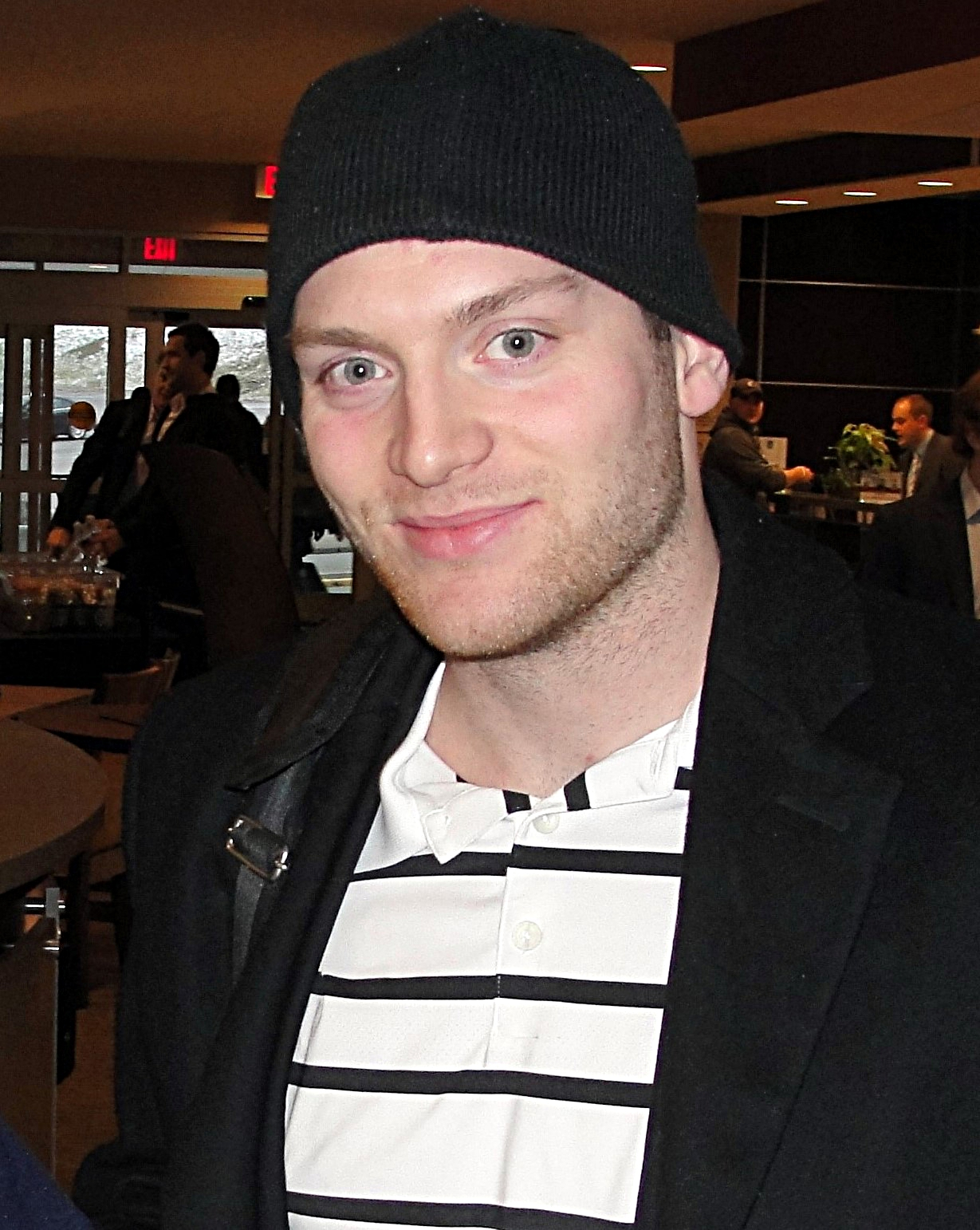
- Letestu in 2012
- Born: February 4, 1985 (age 41) Elk Point, Alberta, Canada
- Height: 5 ft 10 in (178 cm)
- Weight: 195 lb (88 kg; 13 st 13 lb)
- Position: Centre
- Shot: Right
- Played for: Pittsburgh Penguins; Columbus Blue Jackets; Edmonton Oilers; Winnipeg Jets
- NHL draft: Undrafted
- Playing career: 2007–2020

Mark Letestu (born February 4, 1985) is a Canadian former professional ice hockey forward and coach who currently serves as an assistant coach for the Vegas Golden Knights of the National Hockey League (NHL). Letestu played eleven seasons in the NHL for the Pittsburgh Penguins, Columbus Blue Jackets, Edmonton Oilers and Winnipeg Jets.

== Playing career ==
=== Early career ===
Letestu played three seasons of junior hockey with the Bonnyville Pontiacs of the Alberta Junior Hockey League (AJHL). During the 2005–06 season, Letestu led the AJHL in scoring with 105 points (50 goals and 55 assist) in 58 games and was named the AJHL's most valuable player.

Letestu then played the 2006–07 season at Western Michigan University of the Central Collegiate Hockey Association (CCHA). Amongst players throughout the entire NCAA, Letestu finished the season 6th in goals, 14th in points and 1st in short-handed goals with five.

=== Pittsburgh Penguins ===
After playing at Western Michigan, Letestu was signed as an undrafted free agent by the NHL's Pittsburgh Penguins on March 22, 2007. He appeared in three regular and two playoff games with the Wilkes-Barre/Scranton Penguins, Pittsburgh's American Hockey League (AHL) affiliate, when he joined the team at the end of the 2006–07 season. In 2007–08 he appeared in 52 games with Wilkes-Barre/Scranton and six games with the Wheeling Nailers of the ECHL. He then spent the entire 2008–09 season in the AHL. In March 2009, Letestu signed a new two-year contract with the Penguins.

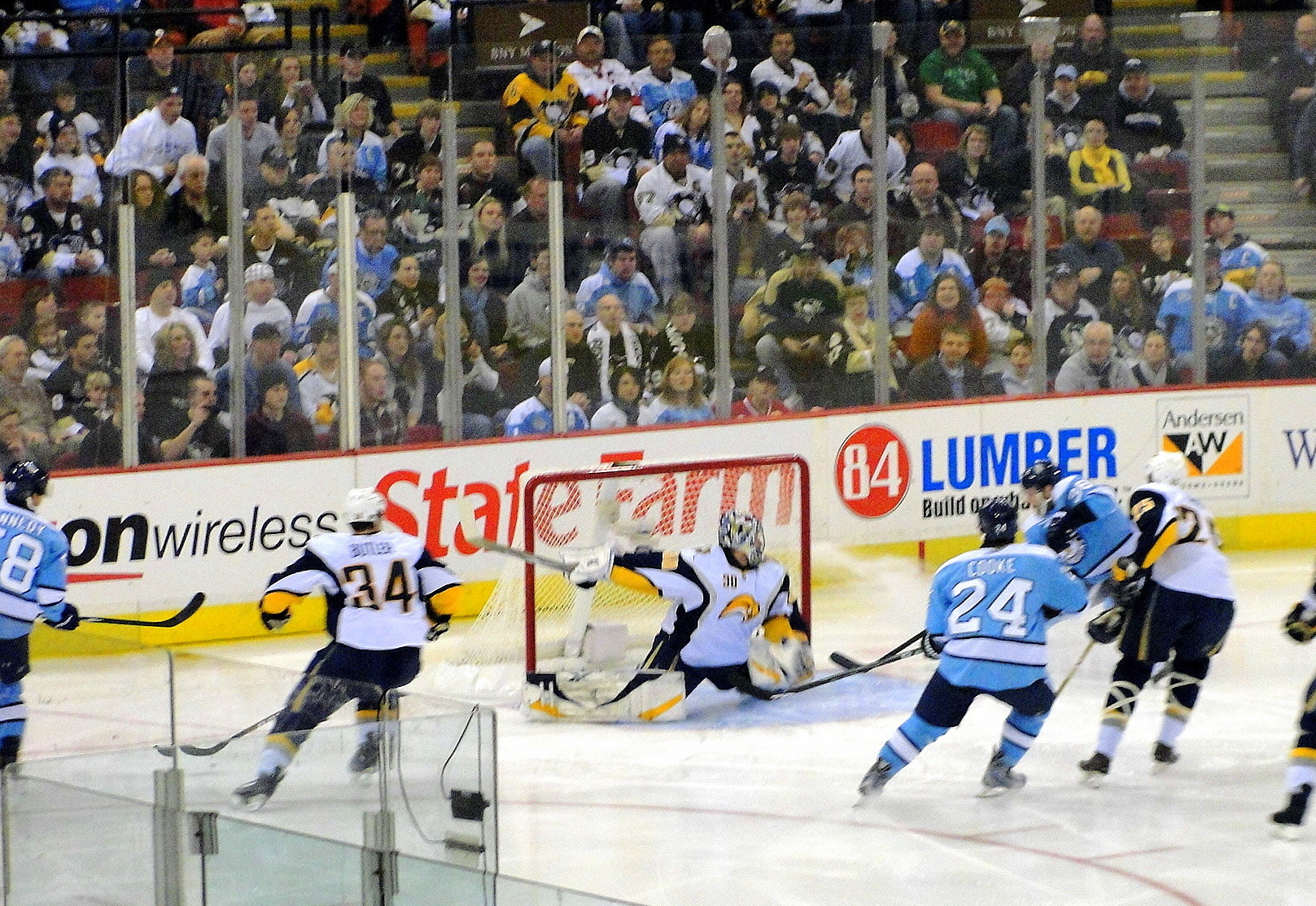
Letestu's first NHL goal

Letestu made his NHL debut on November 14, 2009, against the Boston Bruins. He made another appearance with the Penguins before being reassigned to Wilkes-Barre/Scranton. Letestu was called up again on December 5 and played that night against the Chicago Blackhawks. He received 13:52 of ice time and won a faceoff against John Madden that set up the game's tying goal by Jordan Staal with 31 seconds remaining in the game.

Letestu scored his first career NHL goal on February 1, 2010, against Ryan Miller of the Buffalo Sabres, scoring 47 seconds into the first period; the goal was assisted by Tyler Kennedy and Kris Letang. Letestu was one of seven Wilkes-Barre/Scranton players recalled by Pittsburgh after the AHL Penguins were eliminated in the first round of the 2010 Calder Cup playoffs. He appeared in his first Stanley Cup playoff game in the Penguins' second round series against the Montreal Canadiens on May 4 when he replaced the injured Staal as the third-line centre between Tyler Kennedy and Matt Cooke. In Game 5 on May 8, Letestu recorded his first Stanley Cup playoff point with an assist on a second period goal by Sergei Gonchar.

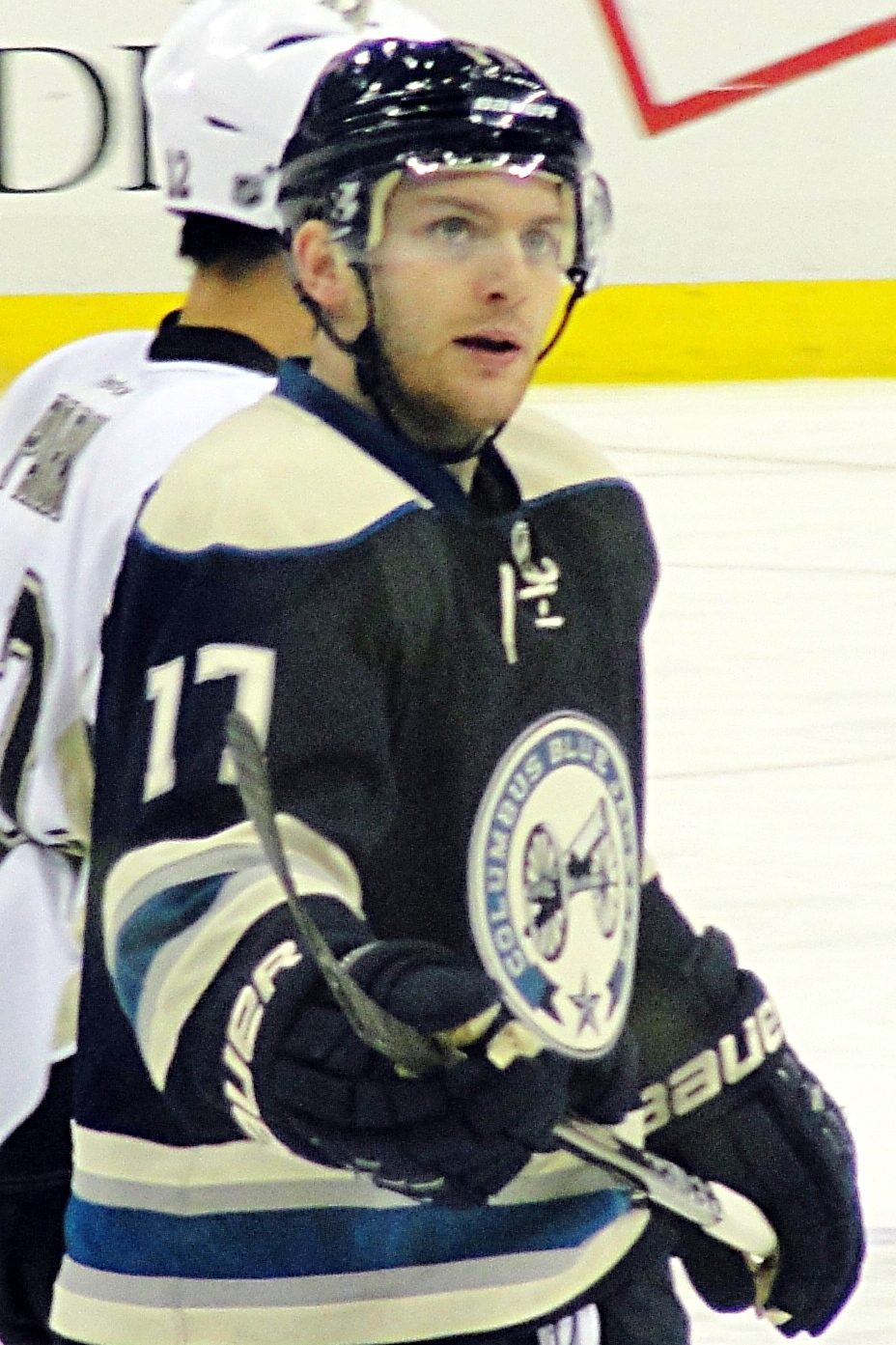
Letestu with the Blue Jackets in 2012

Letestu began the 2010–11 season with the Penguins after delivering a strong training camp and pre-season. He finished the pre-season with one goal and five assists in five games. After scoring against the Chicago Blackhawks during pre-season, Letestu said, "I worked hard this summer... the praise is nice but it's only as good as your last game. I just need to keep playing the way I have been and hopefully force somebody to keep me here." He began the 2010–11 NHL regular season equally as strong, scoring game-winning goals in two of his first three games, being named one of the Stars of the Game against Montreal and the New Jersey Devils. Letestu was then named the first star against the Ottawa Senators on October 18, 2010, after scoring a power-play goal and assisting on Evgeni Malkin's goal by winning a faceoff in the Ottawa zone. The performance gave him seven points in his first seven games. Of Letestu, Penguins captain Sidney Crosby said, "He has really made an impact for us."

However, Letestu's production dipped into November, as he went 22 consecutive games without scoring a goal. On December 8, 2010, Letestu broke his scoring drought with the first multi-goal game of his NHL career, scoring twice against the Toronto Maple Leafs. On January 18, 2011, Letestu signed a new two-year contract with the Penguins worth an average annual value of $625,000. At the time, he was tenth among all NHL rookies in scoring (19 points) and had scored three game-winning goals.

=== Columbus Blue Jackets ===
On November 8, 2011, Letestu was traded to the Columbus Blue Jackets in exchange for a fourth-round draft pick. Letestu finished the season with 25 points in 62 games split between both clubs. During the 2013–14 and 2014–15 seasons, Letestu was an alternate captain for the Blue Jackets.

=== Edmonton Oilers ===
After three-and-a-half seasons with the Blue Jackets, Letestu left the club as a free agent on July 1, 2015, after signing a three-year contract with the Edmonton Oilers. During the 2016–17 season, Letestu scored a career-high 16 goals to go along with a career-high 35 points.

=== Return to Columbus ===
On February 25, 2018, Letestu was traded to the Nashville Predators in exchange for Pontus Åberg. Later that day, Letestu was traded from Nashville to the Blue Jackets in exchange for a fourth-round pick in the 2018 NHL entry draft. Letestu and the Blue Jackets reached the 2018 playoffs but were eliminated in the first round by the Washington Capitals. Letestu went scoreless in six games.

On August 14, 2018, Letestu agreed to attend the Florida Panthers' training camp on a professional try-out (PTO) contract. He was released from his PTO contract on September 24.

On September 27, Letestu returned to the Blue Jackets after signing a one-year, two-way contract. He was immediately placed on waivers for the purpose of assignment to the team's AHL affiliate, the Cleveland Monsters.

=== Winnipeg Jets ===
Having left the Blue Jackets as a free agent, on July 2, 2019, Letestu signed a one-year, two-way contract with the Winnipeg Jets.

== Coaching career ==
In June 2021, Letestu joined the Columbus Blue Jackets as a development coach before being named an assistant coach for the team's AHL affiliate, the Cleveland Monsters four months later. He spent four seasons with the Monsters from 2021 to 2025, during which the team compiled a 136-117-23-16 regular-season record. In 2023–24 season, the Monsters won the North Division title and advanced to the conference finals.

After the Monsters were eliminated from the playoffs in the 2024–25 season, Letestu was named by the Colorado Avalanche as the head coach of their AHL affiliate, the Colorado Eagles, on July 5, 2025. He led the team to a 41-20-11 record in the 2025–26 season, reaching the Western Conference Final before losing to the Chicago Wolves.

On June 30, 2026, Letestu was hired by the Vegas Golden Knights as an assistant coach.

== Career statistics ==
			Regular season					Playoffs
Season	Team	League	GP	G	A	Pts	PIM	GP	G	A	Pts	PIM
2002–03	Bonnyville Pontiacs	AJHL	11	7	1	8	0	—	—	—	—	—
2003–04	Bonnyville Pontiacs	AJHL	58	22	27	49	24	—	—	—	—	—
2004–05	Bonnyville Pontiacs	AJHL	63	39	47	86	32	—	—	—	—	—
2005–06	Bonnyville Pontiacs	AJHL	58	50	55	105	59	—	—	—	—	—
2006–07	Western Michigan University	CCHA	37	24	22	46	14	—	—	—	—	—
2006–07	Wilkes-Barre/Scranton Penguins	AHL	3	0	0	0	0	2	0	0	0	2
2007–08	Wilkes-Barre/Scranton Penguins	AHL	52	6	12	18	28	13	0	3	3	0
2007–08	Wheeling Nailers	ECHL	6	1	2	3	4	—	—	—	—	—
2008–09	Wilkes-Barre/Scranton Penguins	AHL	73	24	37	61	6	12	2	8	10	4
2009–10	Wilkes-Barre/Scranton Penguins	AHL	63	21	34	55	21	4	0	3	3	0
2009–10	Pittsburgh Penguins	NHL	10	1	0	1	2	4	0	1	1	0
2010–11	Pittsburgh Penguins	NHL	64	14	13	27	21	7	0	1	1	0
2011–12	Pittsburgh Penguins	NHL	11	0	1	1	2	—	—	—	—	—
2011–12	Columbus Blue Jackets	NHL	51	11	13	24	6	—	—	—	—	—
2012–13	Columbus Blue Jackets	NHL	46	13	14	27	10	—	—	—	—	—
2013–14	Columbus Blue Jackets	NHL	82	12	22	34	20	6	1	1	2	0
2014–15	Columbus Blue Jackets	NHL	54	7	6	13	0	—	—	—	—	—
2015–16	Edmonton Oilers	NHL	82	10	15	25	10	—	—	—	—	—
2016–17	Edmonton Oilers	NHL	78	16	19	35	17	13	5	6	11	2
2017–18	Edmonton Oilers	NHL	60	8	11	19	10	—	—	—	—	—
2017–18	Columbus Blue Jackets	NHL	20	1	3	4	0	6	0	0	0	0
2018–19	Cleveland Monsters	AHL	64	21	29	50	16	8	3	2	5	2
2018–19	Columbus Blue Jackets	NHL	2	0	0	0	0	—	—	—	—	—
2019–20	Winnipeg Jets	NHL	7	0	0	0	0	—	—	—	—	—
NHL totals			567	93	117	210	90	36	6	9	15	2

== Awards and honours ==
Award	Year
College
All-CCHA Rookie Team	2007

Awards and achievements
Preceded by Jeff Lerg	CCHA Rookie of the Year; 2006–07	Succeeded by Max Pacioretty
