= Marcus Modigs =

Swedish ice hockey player

- Born: April 6, 1992 (age 33)
- Height: 5 ft 10 in (178 cm)
- Weight: 174 lb (79 kg; 12 st 6 lb)
- Position: Left wing
- Shoots: Left
- Elitserien team: Linköpings HC
- NHL draft: Undrafted
- Playing career: 2011–present

Marcus Modigs (born April 6, 1992) is a Swedish professional ice hockey player who currently plays for Linköpings HC of the Swedish Elitserien.
