= Jyri Niemi =

Finnish ice hockey player

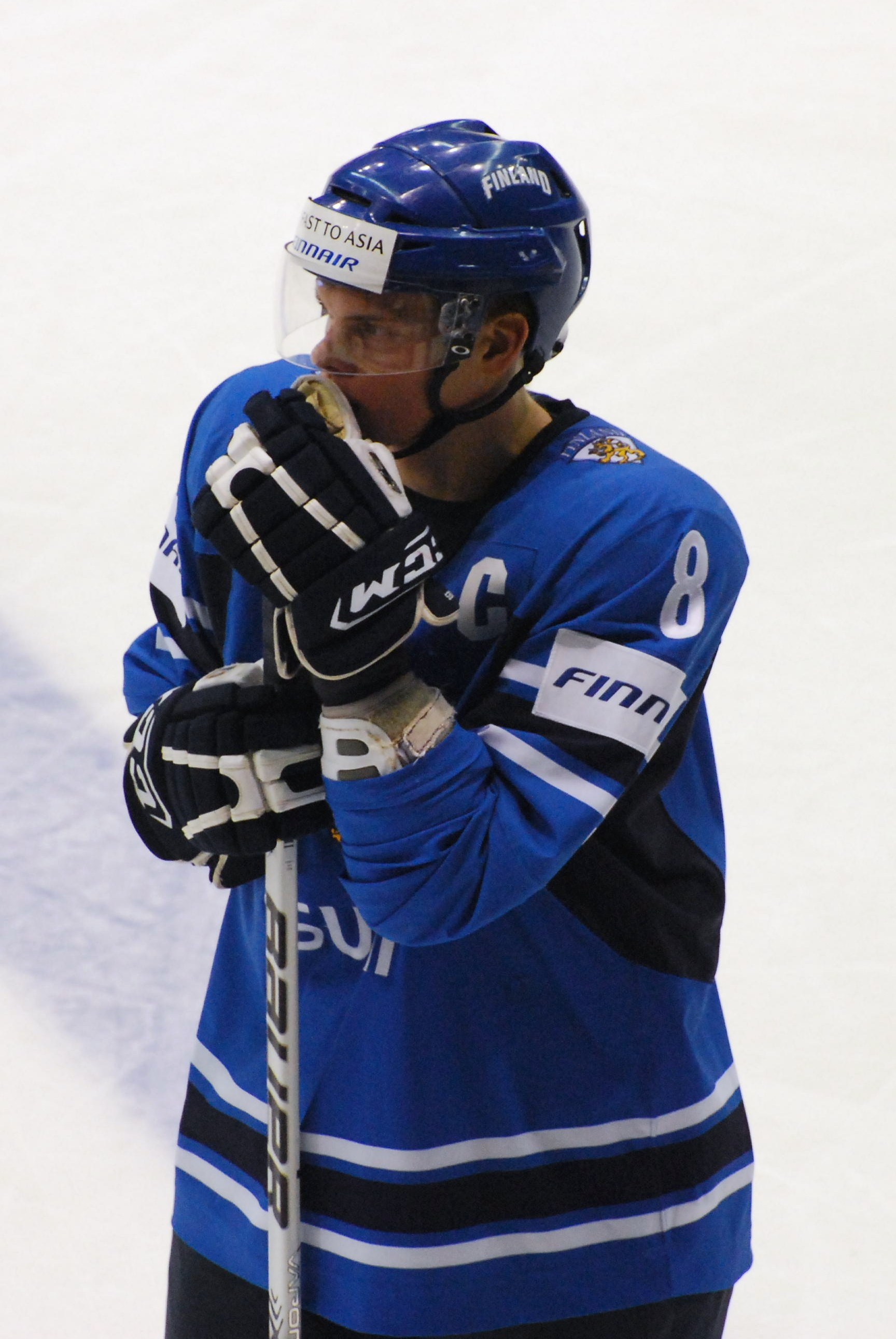
- Born: June 15, 1990 (age 36) Hämeenkyrö, Finland
- Height: 6 ft 2 in (188 cm)
- Weight: 207 lb (94 kg; 14 st 11 lb)
- Position: Defence
- Shot: Left
- Played for: Connecticut Whale; HPK; Ilves; KooKoo; Vaasan Sport
- NHL draft: 72nd overall, 2008; New York Islanders
- Playing career: 2010–2019

Jyri Niemi (born June 15, 1990) is a Finnish former professional ice hockey defenceman. Niemi was selected by the New York Islanders in the 3rd round (72nd overall) of the 2008 NHL entry draft.

== Playing career ==
Niemi played three seasons in major junior, with the Saskatoon Blades of the Western Hockey League. Unable to agree to terms with the Islanders on May 5, 2010, Niemi's rights were traded by the Islanders to neighboring rivals, the New York Rangers in exchange for a sixth-round draft pick. He was immediately signed to a three-year entry-level contract to begin his professional career.

On May 17, 2013, HPK of the Finnish Liiga announced they had signed Niemi to play for the 2013–14 season.

== Career statistics ==
=== Regular season and playoffs ===
			Regular season					Playoffs
Season	Team	League	GP	G	A	Pts	PIM	GP	G	A	Pts	PIM
2006–07	HPK	Jr. A	35	6	3	9	72	—	—	—	—	—
2007–08	Saskatoon Blades	WHL	49	14	20	34	57	—	—	—	—	—
2008–09	Saskatoon Blades	WHL	60	7	25	32	74	6	1	6	7	10
2009–10	Saskatoon Blades	WHL	50	8	21	29	67	10	2	0	2	26
2010–11	Hartford Wolf Pack/CT Whale	AHL	46	3	6	9	22	—	—	—	—	—
2011–12	Connecticut Whale	AHL	8	0	1	1	4	—	—	—	—	—
2011–12	Greenville Road Warriors	ECHL	52	9	12	21	82	3	0	1	1	2
2012–13	Connecticut Whale	AHL	11	1	1	2	9	—	—	—	—	—
2012–13	Greenville Road Warriors	ECHL	15	1	5	6	34	5	0	0	0	12
2013–14	HPK	Liiga	23	1	8	9	32	5	0	0	0	2
2014–15	HPK	Liiga	41	4	9	13	28	—	—	—	—	—
2015–16	Ilves	Liiga	24	1	5	6	22	—	—	—	—	—
2016–17	Ilves	Liiga	12	0	3	3	6	—	—	—	—	—
2017–18	KooKoo	Liiga	34	2	8	10	55	—	—	—	—	—
2018–19	Vaasan Sport	Liiga	41	4	12	16	97	—	—	—	—	—
Liiga totals			175	12	45	57	240	5	0	0	0	2

=== International ===
Year	Team	Event	Result	GP	G	A	Pts	PIM
2009	Finland	WJC	7th	6	2	1	3	6
2010	Finland	WJC	5th	6	3	2	5	6
Junior totals				12	5	3	8	12
