= Mattias Modig =

Swedish ice hockey player (born 1987)

- Born: 1 April 1987 (age 39) Luleå, Sweden
- Height: 6 ft 1 in (185 cm)
- Weight: 179 lb (81 kg; 12 st 11 lb)
- Position: Goaltender
- Caught: Left
- Played for: Luleå HF; Wheeling Nailers; Växjö Lakers; Nottingham Panthers
- NHL draft: 121st overall, 2007; Anaheim Ducks
- Playing career: 2006–2016

Mattias Modig (born 1 April 1987) is a Swedish former professional ice hockey goaltender. He played in the Swedish Hockey League (SHL) with Luleå HF and Växjö Lakers.

== Playing career ==
Modig began his professional career in the Swedish Elitserien (SEL) with Luleå HF during the 2005–06 season. He appeared with Luleå in five seasons through 2010, playing in 126 games.

He was drafted by the Anaheim Ducks in the 2007 NHL entry draft, 121st overall in the fourth round. In 2010, the Ducks traded Modig's rights to the Pittsburgh Penguins in exchange for a sixth-round draft pick in the 2010 draft. The Penguins then agreed to terms with Mattias Modig to a two-year entry-level contract.

Modig spent the 2010–11 season with the Penguins' ECHL affiliate Wheeling Nailers. However, after only playing nine games, Modig received an injury to his knee, effectively ending the season. He was slated to play for the Penguins' American Hockey League (AHL) affiliate Wilkes-Barre/Scranton Penguins in the 2011–12 season, but the knee injury he had received in the 2010–11 season carried over to the entire 2011–12 season.

On 14 June 2012, Modig signed a two-year contract with the Växjö Lakers of the SEL.

In October 2014, Modig was loaned out to the Nottingham Panthers of the EIHL, only to return a week later for the rest of the 2014–15 season.

== International play ==
Modig has played for Sweden's national U18 team in the 2005 IIHF World U18 Championships, played five games for Sweden's U20 team between 2005–07, as well as three games for Sweden's national senior team.
