= 2010–11 Philadelphia Flyers season =

NHL hockey team season

2010–11 Philadelphia Flyers
- Atlantic Division champions
- Division: 1st Atlantic
- Conference: 2nd Eastern
- 2010–11 record: 47–23–12
- Home record: 22–12–7
- Road record: 25–11–5
- Goals for: 259
- Goals against: 223

Team information
- General manager: Paul Holmgren
- Coach: Peter Laviolette
- Captain: Mike Richards
- Alternate captains: Jeff Carter; Chris Pronger; Kimmo Timonen
- Arena: Wells Fargo Center
- Average attendance: 19,710 (101.1%)
- Minor league affiliates: Adirondack Phantoms; Greenville Road Warriors

Team leaders
- Goals: Jeff Carter (36)
- Assists: Claude Giroux (51)
- Points: Claude Giroux (76)
- Penalty minutes: Scott Hartnell (142)
- Plus/minus: Matt Carle (+30); Andrej Meszaros (+30)
- Wins: Sergei Bobrovsky (28)
- Goals against average: Brian Boucher (2.42)

The 2010–11 Philadelphia Flyers season was the franchise's 44th season in the National Hockey League (NHL). The Flyers lost in the second round of the 2011 playoffs to the Boston Bruins in a four-game sweep.

== Off-season ==
Coming off a close loss to the Chicago Blackhawks in the Stanley Cup Final, the Flyers traded Simon Gagne to the Tampa Bay Lightning to clear up cap space, acquired Andrej Meszaros from Tampa Bay in a separate trade and signed free agent Sean O'Donnell to shore up the defense.

== Regular season ==
The Flyers started the season with rookie goaltender Sergei Bobrovsky from the Kontinental Hockey League (KHL) in Russia, who recorded an opening-night win in his NHL debut against the Pittsburgh Penguins and had steady numbers throughout the season. Brian Boucher remained as the backup goaltender while Michael Leighton played one game in December after recovering from a back injury and was sent to Adirondack in the AHL. The Flyers led both the Atlantic Division and Eastern Conference for the majority of the season and challenged the Vancouver Canucks for the overall NHL lead. Kris Versteeg was brought in from the Toronto Maple Leafs to add additional offense for the stretch drive and playoffs. However, lackluster play throughout March and April, coupled with a broken hand suffered by Chris Pronger in late February that ended his regular season, cost the Flyers the top seed in the East during the last week of the regular season, although the Flyers hung on to win their first Atlantic Division title since 2003–04 and clinched the second seed in the East.

=== Season standings ===
Atlantic Division
		GP	W	L	OTL	ROW	GF	GA	Pts
**1**	**Philadelphia Flyers**	**82**	**47**	**23**	**12**	**44**	**259**	**223**	**106**
**2**	**Pittsburgh Penguins**	**82**	**49**	**25**	**8**	**39**	**238**	**199**	**106**
**3**	**New York Rangers**	**82**	**44**	**33**	**5**	**35**	**233**	**198**	**93**
4	New Jersey Devils	82	38	39	5	35	174	209	81
5	New York Islanders	82	30	39	13	26	229	264	73

Eastern Conference
R		Div	GP	W	L	OTL	ROW	GF	GA	Pts
**1**	**z – Washington Capitals**	**SE**	**82**	**48**	**23**	**11**	**43**	**224**	**197**	107
**2**	**y – Philadelphia Flyers**	**AT**	**82**	**47**	**23**	**12**	**44**	**259**	**223**	106
**3**	**y – Boston Bruins**	**NE**	**82**	**46**	**25**	**11**	**44**	**246**	**195**	103
**4**	**Pittsburgh Penguins**	**AT**	**82**	**49**	**25**	**8**	**39**	**238**	**199**	106
**5**	**Tampa Bay Lightning**	**SE**	**82**	**46**	**25**	**11**	**40**	**247**	**240**	103
**6**	**Montreal Canadiens**	**NE**	**82**	**44**	**30**	**8**	**41**	**216**	**209**	96
**7**	**Buffalo Sabres**	**NE**	**82**	**43**	**29**	**10**	**38**	**245**	**229**	96
**8**	**New York Rangers**	**AT**	**82**	**44**	**33**	**5**	**35**	**233**	**198**	93
8.5
9	Carolina Hurricanes	SE	82	40	31	11	35	236	239	91
10	Toronto Maple Leafs	NE	82	37	34	11	32	218	251	85
11	New Jersey Devils	AT	82	38	39	5	35	174	209	81
12	Atlanta Thrashers	SE	82	34	36	12	29	223	269	80
13	Ottawa Senators	NE	82	32	40	10	30	192	250	74
14	New York Islanders	AT	82	30	39	13	26	229	264	73
15	Florida Panthers	SE	82	30	40	12	26	195	229	72

bold – qualified for playoffs; y – Won division; z – Placed first in conference (and division)
AT – Atlantic Division, NE – Northeast Division, SE – Southeast Division

== Playoffs ==
The Flyers drew the Buffalo Sabres in the first round. Sergei Bobrovsky played well in a 1–0 Game 1 loss, but was replaced in Game 2 for Brian Boucher, who held on for a 5–4 Flyers win. Boucher played well in a Game 3 win and a Game 4 loss, but was replaced himself in a favor of Michael Leighton during a poor first period in Game 5, and Buffalo won in overtime. Pronger returned to the lineup and Leighton started Game 6 but was replaced by Boucher after a sub-par first period, but the Flyers went on to win in overtime and forced a Game 7, which Boucher started. The Flyers dominated Buffalo, winning 5–2, and became the first team to win a playoff series starting three different goaltenders since 1988.

The Flyers then drew a rematch with the Boston Bruins in the second round. Boston dominated the Flyers in Game 1, where Boucher was again replaced, this time by Bobrovsky. Pronger again left the lineup with an undisclosed injury, while Boston won Game 2 in overtime and again dominated the Flyers in Game 3 to take a 3–0 series lead. Bobrovsky started Game 4, but there would be no such comeback like their previous meeting as Boston completed the sweep of the Flyers. The Flyers tied an NHL record with seven playoff in-game goalie changes, and were the only NHL team not to record a shutout in either the regular season or playoffs.

== Schedule and results ==
=== Preseason ===
2010 preseason
Preseason: 5–2–1 (home: 3–0–1; road: 2–2–0)

Game	Date	Score	Opponent	Decision	Attendance	Record	Recap
1	September 21	4–3 (SO)	New Jersey Devils	Bobrovsky	19,288	1–0–0	W
2^{[a]}	September 23	2–3 (SO)	Toronto Maple Leafs	Bobrovsky	8,765	1–0–1	OTL
3	September 24	4–3 (SO)	@ Toronto Maple Leafs	Boucher	18,375	2–0–1	W
4	September 25	3–2 (SO)	@ Minnesota Wild	Bobrovsky	16,742	3–0–1	W
5	September 28	2–3	@ New Jersey Devils	Boucher	10,124	3–1–1	L
6	September 29	3–1	New York Islanders	Bobrovsky	17,978	4–1–1	W
7	October 1	3–1	Buffalo Sabres	Boucher	18,848	4–2–1	W
8	October 3	3–9	@ Buffalo Sabres	Backlund	18,690	4–3–1	L
Notes:^{a} Game played at John Labatt Centre in London, Ontario.

Legend: W Win (2 points) L Loss (0 points) OTL Overtime/shootout loss (1 point)

=== Regular season ===
2010–11 regular season
October: 6–4–1, 13 points (home: 4–3–0; road: 2–1–1)

Game	Date	Score	Opponent	Decision	Attendance	Record	Points	Recap
1	October 7	3–2	@ Pittsburgh Penguins	Bobrovsky	18,289	1–0–0	2	W
2	October 9	1–2 (OT)	@ St. Louis Blues	Boucher	19,150	1–0–1	3	OTL
3	October 11	4–2	Colorado Avalanche	Bobrovsky	19,652	2–0–1	5	W
4	October 14	2–3	Tampa Bay Lightning	Boucher	19,592	2–1–1	5	L
5	October 16	1–5	Pittsburgh Penguins	Bobrovsky	19,684	2–2–1	5	L
6	October 21	2–3	Anaheim Ducks	Bobrovsky	19,012	2–3–1	5	L
7	October 23	5–2	Toronto Maple Leafs	Boucher	19,382	3–3–1	7	W
8	October 25	1–2	@ Columbus Blue Jackets	Boucher	11,727	3–4–1	7	L
9	October 26	6–3	Buffalo Sabres	Bobrovsky	19,361	4–4–1	9	W
10	October 29	3–2	@ Pittsburgh Penguins	Bobrovsky	18,275	5–4–1	11	W
11	October 30	6–1	New York Islanders	Bobrovsky	19,613	6–4–1	13	W

November: 9–2–3, 21 points (home: 5–1–1; road: 4–1–2)

Game	Date	Score	Opponent	Decision	Attendance	Record	Points	Recap
12	November 1	3–2	Carolina Hurricanes	Bobrovsky	19,038	7–4–1	15	W
13	November 4	4–1	New York Rangers	Bobrovsky	19,652	8–4–1	17	W
14	November 6	2–1	@ New York Islanders	Bobrovsky	13,078	9–4–1	19	W
15	November 7	2–3 (OT)	@ Washington Capitals	Bobrovsky	18,398	9–4–2	20	OTL
16	November 11	8–1	@ Carolina Hurricanes	Bobrovsky	14,719	10–4–2	22	W
17	November 13	5–2	Florida Panthers	Bobrovsky	19,616	11–4–2	24	W
18	November 15	5–1	Ottawa Senators	Bobrovsky	19,246	12–4–2	26	W
19	November 16	0–3	@ Montreal Canadiens	Bobrovsky	21,273	12–5–2	26	L
20	November 18	7–8	Tampa Bay Lightning	Boucher	19,672	12–6–2	26	L
21	November 20	5–4 (SO)	@ Washington Capitals	Boucher	18,398	13–6–2	28	W
22	November 22	3–2	Montreal Canadiens	Boucher	19,753	14–6–2	30	W
23	November 24	6–1	@ Minnesota Wild	Bobrovsky	16,516	15–6–2	32	W
24	November 26	2–3 (SO)	Calgary Flames	Bobrovsky	19,872	15–6–3	33	OTL
25	November 27	1–2 (SO)	@ New Jersey Devils	Boucher	17,625	15–6–4	34	OTL

December: 8–4–1, 17 points (home: 3–2–1; road: 5–2–0)

Game	Date	Score	Opponent	Decision	Attendance	Record	Points	Recap
26	December 1	0–3	Boston Bruins	Bobrovsky	19,684	15–7–4	34	L
27	December 4	5–3	New Jersey Devils	Bobrovsky	19,657	16–7–4	36	W
28	December 5	3–2	@ New York Islanders	Bobrovsky	7,773	17–7–4	38	W
29	December 8	4–5 (SO)	San Jose Sharks	Bobrovsky	19,801	17–7–5	39	OTL
30	December 9	4–1	@ Toronto Maple Leafs	Boucher	19,365	18–7–5	41	W
31	December 11	2–1 (OT)	@ Boston Bruins	Boucher	17,565	19–7–5	43	W
32	December 14	3–2	Pittsburgh Penguins	Boucher	19,824	20–7–5	45	W
33	December 15	5–3	@ Montreal Canadiens	Bobrovsky	21,273	21–7–5	47	W
34	December 18	4–1	New York Rangers	Boucher	19,898	22–7–5	49	W
35	December 20	0–5	Florida Panthers	Bobrovsky	19,864	22–8–5	49	L
36	December 28	2–6	@ Vancouver Canucks	Boucher	18,860	22–9–5	49	L
37	December 30	7–4	@ Los Angeles Kings	Leighton	18,118	23–9–5	51	W
38	December 31	2–5	@ Anaheim Ducks	Bobrovsky	17,103	23–10–5	51	L

January: 10–2–0, 20 points (home: 4–1–0; road: 6–1–0)

Game	Date	Score	Opponent	Decision	Attendance	Record	Points	Recap
39	January 2	3–2	@ Detroit Red Wings	Boucher	20,066	24–10–5	53	W
40	January 6	4–2	@ New Jersey Devils	Boucher	15,098	25–10–5	55	W
41	January 8	2–1	New Jersey Devils	Boucher	19,859	26–10–5	57	W
42	January 11	5–2	@ Buffalo Sabres	Bobrovsky	18,155	27–10–5	59	W
43	January 13	5–7	@ Boston Bruins	Boucher	17,565	27–11–5	59	L
44	January 14	5–2	@ Atlanta Thrashers	Bobrovsky	15,081	28–11–5	61	W
45	January 16	3–2	@ New York Rangers	Boucher	18,200	29–11–5	63	W
46	January 18	3–2 (OT)	Washington Capitals	Bobrovsky	19,824	30–11–5	65	W
47	January 20	6–2	Ottawa Senators	Bobrovsky	19,721	31–11–5	67	W
48	January 22	1–3	New Jersey Devils	Boucher	19,847	31–12–5	67	L
49	January 23	4–1	@ Chicago Blackhawks	Bobrovsky	21,660	32–12–5	69	W
50	January 25	5–2	Montreal Canadiens	Bobrovsky	19,878	33–12–5	71	W

February: 7–4–1, 15 points (home: 4–1–1; road: 3–3–0)

Game	Date	Score	Opponent	Decision	Attendance	Record	Points	Recap
51	February 1	0–4	@ Tampa Bay Lightning	Bobrovsky	16,635	33–13–5	71	L
52	February 3	3–2	Nashville Predators	Bobrovsky	19,702	34–13–5	73	W
53	February 5	3–1	Dallas Stars	Boucher	19,881	35–13–5	75	W
54	February 10	2–1	Carolina Hurricanes	Boucher	19,726	36–13–5	77	W
55	February 13	0–1	Los Angeles Kings	Bobrovsky	19,724	36–14–5	77	L
56	February 15	4–3 (SO)	@ Tampa Bay Lightning	Boucher	16,950	37–14–5	79	W
57	February 16	4–2	@ Florida Panthers	Bobrovsky	17,077	38–14–5	81	W
58	February 18	2–3	@ Carolina Hurricanes	Bobrovsky	18,726	38–15–5	81	L
59	February 20	4–2	@ New York Rangers	Boucher	18,200	39–15–5	83	W
60	February 22	2–3 (OT)	Phoenix Coyotes	Bobrovsky	19,875	39–15–6	84	OTL
61	February 24	4–3 (OT)	New York Islanders	Bobrovsky	19,776	40–15–6	86	W
62	February 26	1–4	@ Ottawa Senators	Boucher	19,934	40–16–6	86	L

March: 6–5–4, 16 points (home: 1–4–3; road: 5–1–1)

Game	Date	Score	Opponent	Decision	Attendance	Record	Points	Recap
63	March 3	2–3	Toronto Maple Leafs	Bobrovsky	19,811	40–17–6	86	L
64	March 5	3–5	Buffalo Sabres	Bobrovsky	19,901	40–18–6	86	L
65	March 6	0–7	@ New York Rangers	Boucher	18,200	40–19–6	86	L
66	March 8	4–1	Edmonton Oilers	Bobrovsky	19,730	41–19–6	88	W
67	March 10	3–2	@ Toronto Maple Leafs	Boucher	19,475	42–19–6	90	W
68	March 12	4–5 (OT)	Atlanta Thrashers	Bobrovsky	19,892	42–19–7	91	OTL
69	March 15	3–2	@ Florida Panthers	Boucher	17,377	43–19–7	93	W
70	March 17	3–4 (SO)	@ Atlanta Thrashers	Boucher	16,502	43–19–8	94	OTL
71	March 19	3–2 (SO)	@ Dallas Stars	Bobrovsky	17,652	44–19–8	96	W
72	March 22	4–5 (SO)	Washington Capitals	Boucher	19,893	44–19–9	97	OTL
73	March 24	1–2 (SO)	Pittsburgh Penguins	Bobrovsky	19,902	44–19–10	98	OTL
74	March 26	4–1	@ New York Islanders	Bobrovsky	15,458	45–19–10	100	W
75	March 27	1–2	Boston Bruins	Boucher	19,927	45–20–10	100	L
76	March 29	5–2	@ Pittsburgh Penguins	Bobrovsky	18,335	46–20–10	102	W
77	March 31	0–1	Atlanta Thrashers	Bobrovsky	19,879	46–21–10	102	L

April: 1–2–2, 4 points (home: 1–0–1; road: 0–2–1)

Game	Date	Score	Opponent	Decision	Attendance	Record	Points	Recap
78	April 1	2–4	@ New Jersey Devils	Boucher	17,625	46–22–10	102	L
79	April 3	2–3 (SO)	New York Rangers	Bobrovsky	19,788	46–22–11	103	OTL
80	April 5	2–5	@ Ottawa Senators	Bobrovsky	18,397	46–23–11	103	L
81	April 8	3–4 (OT)	@ Buffalo Sabres	Bobrovsky	18,690	46–23–12	104	OTL
82	April 9	7–4	New York Islanders	Boucher	19,909	47–23–12	106	W

Legend: W Win (2 points) L Loss (0 points) OTL Overtime/shootout loss (1 point)

=== Playoffs ===
2011 Stanley Cup playoffs
Eastern Conference quarterfinals vs. Buffalo Sabres – Flyers win 4–3

Game	Date	Score	Opponent	Decision	Attendance	Series	Recap
1	April 14	0–1	Buffalo Sabres	Bobrovsky	19,929	Sabres lead 1–0	L
2	April 16	5–4	Buffalo Sabres	Boucher	19,942	Series tied 1–1	W
3	April 18	4–2	@ Buffalo Sabres	Boucher	18,690	Flyers lead 2–1	W
4	April 20	0–1	@ Buffalo Sabres	Boucher	18,690	Series tied 2–2	L
5	April 22	3–4 (OT)	Buffalo Sabres	Leighton	19,959	Sabres lead 3–2	L
6	April 24	5–4 (OT)	@ Buffalo Sabres	Boucher	18,690	Series tied 3–3	W
7	April 26	5–2	Buffalo Sabres	Boucher	19,966	Flyers win 4–3	W

Eastern Conference semifinals vs. Boston Bruins – Bruins win 4–0

Game	Date	Score	Opponent	Decision	Attendance	Series	Recap
1	April 30	3–7	Boston Bruins	Boucher	19,641	Bruins lead 1–0	L
2	May 2	2–3 (OT)	Boston Bruins	Boucher	19,962	Bruins lead 2–0	L
3	May 4	1–5	@ Boston Bruins	Boucher	17,565	Bruins lead 3–0	L
4	May 6	1–5	@ Boston Bruins	Bobrovsky	17,565	Bruins win 4–0	L

Legend: W Win L Loss

== Player statistics ==
=== Scoring ===
- Position abbreviations: C = Center; D = Defense; G = Goaltender; LW = Left wing; RW = Right wing
- † = Joined team via a transaction (e.g., trade, waivers, signing) during the season. Stats reflect time with the Flyers only.
- ‡ = Left team via a transaction (e.g., trade, waivers, release) during the season. Stats reflect time with the Flyers only.

No.	Player	Pos	Regular season						Playoffs					
No.	Player	Pos	GP	G	A	Pts	+/-	PIM	GP	G	A	Pts	+/-	PIM
28	Claude Giroux	RW	82	25	51	76	20	47	11	1	11	12	2	8
48	Danny Briere	C	77	34	34	68	20	87	11	7	2	9	−7	14
17	Jeff Carter	C	80	36	30	66	27	39	6	1	1	2	−3	2
18	Mike Richards	C	81	23	43	66	11	62	11	1	6	7	−1	15
22	Ville Leino	RW	81	19	34	53	14	22	11	3	2	5	−1	0
19	Scott Hartnell	LW	82	24	25	49	14	142	11	1	3	4	−5	23
21	James van Riemsdyk	LW	75	21	19	40	15	35	11	7	0	7	−3	4
25	Matt Carle	D	82	1	39	40	30	23	11	0	4	4	−8	2
44	Kimmo Timonen	D	82	6	31	37	11	36	11	1	5	6	3	14
41	Andrej Meszaros	D	81	8	24	32	30	42	11	2	4	6	−3	8
20	Chris Pronger	D	50	4	21	25	7	44	3	0	1	1	−3	4
93	Nikolay Zherdev	RW	56	16	6	22	5	22	8	1	2	3	−1	2
15	Andreas Nodl	RW	67	11	11	22	14	16	2	0	0	0	0	0
6	Sean O'Donnell	D	81	1	17	18	8	87	11	0	2	2	−2	5
36	Darroll Powe	C	81	7	10	17	−6	41	11	0	1	1	−3	4
5	Braydon Coburn	D	82	2	14	16	15	53	11	1	2	3	0	6
11	Blair Betts	C	75	5	7	12	−3	8	11	0	0	0	−2	0
10	Kris Versteeg†	RW	27	7	4	11	4	24	11	1	5	6	1	12
13	Daniel Carcillo	LW	57	4	2	6	−14	127	11	2	1	3	2	30
45	Jody Shelley	LW	58	2	2	4	0	127	2	0	0	0	0	2
35	Sergei Bobrovsky	G	54	0	2	2		2	6	0	0	0		0
47	Eric Wellwood	LW	3	0	1	1	1	2	—	—	—	—	—	—
3	Oskars Bartulis	D	13	0	0	0	−4	4	—	—	—	—	—	—
33	Brian Boucher	G	34	0	0	0		0	9	0	0	0		2
24	Nick Boynton†	D	10	0	0	0	−3	4	—	—	—	—	—	—
27	Erik Gustafsson	D	3	0	0	0	−3	4	—	—	—	—	—	—
34	Ben Holmstrom	C	2	0	0	0	−1	5	—	—	—	—	—	—
49	Michael Leighton	G	1	0	0	0		0	2	0	0	0		0
26	Danny Syvret†	D	4	0	0	0	0	2	10	0	0	0	−3	0
8	Matt Walker	D	4	0	0	0	0	4	—	—	—	—	—	—
51	Zac Rinaldo	C	—	—	—	—	—	—	2	0	0	0	−1	12

=== Goaltending ===
No.	Player	Regular season											Playoffs									
No.	Player	GP	GS	W	L	OT	SA	GA	GAA	SV%	SO	TOI	GP	GS	W	L	SA	GA	GAA	SV%	SO	TOI
35	Sergei Bobrovsky	54	52	28	13	8	1527	130	2.59	.915	0	3,017	6	3	0	2	81	10	3.23	.877	0	186
33	Brian Boucher	34	29	18	10	4	902	76	2.42	.916	0	1,885	9	7	4	4	229	22	3.13	.904	0	422
49	Michael Leighton	1	1	1	0	0	36	4	4.01	.889	0	60	2	1	0	1	29	4	3.44	.862	0	70

== Awards and records ==
=== Awards ===
Type	Award/honor	Recipient	Ref
League (annual)	Bill Masterton Memorial Trophy	Ian Laperriere	
League (in-season)	NHL All-Star Game selection	Danny Briere	
League (in-season)	NHL All-Star Game selection	Claude Giroux	
League (in-season)	NHL All-Star Game selection	Peter Laviolette (coach)	
League (in-season)	NHL Rookie of the Month	Sergei Bobrovsky (November)	
Team	Barry Ashbee Trophy	Andrej Meszaros	
Team	Bobby Clarke Trophy	Claude Giroux	
Team	Gene Hart Memorial Award	Claude Giroux	
Team	Pelle Lindbergh Memorial Trophy	Andreas Nodl	
Team	Toyota Cup	Danny Briere	
Team	Yanick Dupre Memorial Class Guy Award	Brian Boucher	

=== Records ===
Among the team records set during the 2010–11 season was winning a franchise record 25 games on the road (subsequently tied in 2011–12) and tying the team record for fewest shutouts in a season (0).

=== Milestones ===
Milestone	Player	Date	Ref
First game	Sergei Bobrovsky	October 7, 2010	
First game	Eric Wellwood	November 1, 2010	
First game	Erik Gustafsson	February 26, 2011	
First game	Ben Holmstrom	March 3, 2011	
First game	Zac Rinaldo	April 22, 2011	

== Transactions ==
The Flyers were involved in the following transactions from June 10, 2010, the day after the deciding game of the 2010 Stanley Cup Final, through June 15, 2011, the day of the deciding game of the 2011 Stanley Cup Final.

=== Trades ===
Date	Details		Ref
June 19, 2010	To Nashville Predators: Ryan Parent	To Philadelphia Flyers: Rights to Dan Hamhuis; Conditional 7th-round pick in 2011 (Note: The Flyers would have received the draft pick if they did not sign Hamhuis and did not trade the rights to Hamhuis prior to July 1, 2010. They did not receive the pick due to trading Hamhuis' rights on June 25.)	
June 25, 2010	To Pittsburgh Penguins: Rights to Dan Hamhuis	To Philadelphia Flyers: 3rd-round pick in 2011	
June 26, 2010	To Carolina Hurricanes: Jon Matsumoto	To Philadelphia Flyers: 7th-round pick in 2010	
July 1, 2010	To Tampa Bay Lightning: 2nd-round pick in 2012	To Philadelphia Flyers: Andrej Meszaros	
July 19, 2010	To Tampa Bay Lightning: Simon Gagne	To Philadelphia Flyers: Matt Walker; 4th-round pick in 2011	
November 21, 2010	To Anaheim Ducks: David Laliberte; Patrick Maroon	To Philadelphia Flyers: Rob Bordson; Danny Syvret	
February 14, 2011	To Toronto Maple Leafs: 1st-round pick in 2011; 3rd-round pick in 2011	To Philadelphia Flyers: Kris Versteeg	
February 28, 2011	To Columbus Blue Jackets: Greg Moore; Rights to Michael Chaput	To Philadelphia Flyers: Tom Sestito	
June 7, 2011	To Phoenix Coyotes: Matt Clackson; 3rd-round pick in 2012; Conditional 3rd-round pick in 2011 (Note: The Coyotes would receive the 2011 third-round pick if the Flyers signed Bryzgalov before the 2011 NHL entry draft, which they did on June 23.)	To Philadelphia Flyers: Ilya Bryzgalov	

=== Players acquired ===
Date	Player	Former team	Term	Via	Ref
July 1, 2010	Sean O'Donnell	Los Angeles Kings	1-year	Free agency	
July 1, 2010	Jody Shelley	New York Rangers	3-year	Free agency	
July 9, 2010	Nikolay Zherdev	Atlant Moscow Oblast (KHL)	1-year	Free agency	
July 10, 2010	Greg Moore	Columbus Blue Jackets	1-year	Free agency	
July 22, 2010	Dan Jancevski	Dallas Stars	2-year	Free agency	
November 23, 2010	Brandon Manning	Chilliwack Bruins (WHL)	3-year	Free agency	
November 23, 2010	Michael Ryan	Carolina Hurricanes	1-year	Free agency	
February 26, 2011	Nick Boynton	Chicago Blackhawks		Waivers	
March 2, 2011	Jason Akeson	Kitchener Rangers (OHL)	3-year	Free agency	
March 2, 2011	Tyler Brown	Plymouth Whalers (OHL)	3-year	Free agency	
March 7, 2011	Harry Zolnierczyk	Brown University (ECAC)	1-year	Free agency	
March 24, 2011	Matt Read	Bemidji State University (WCHA)	3-year	Free agency	
May 17, 2011	Niko Hovinen	Pelicans (Liiga)	2-year	Free agency	

=== Players lost ===
Date	Player	New team	Via (Note: In parentheses is the player's free agency group on July 1 if applicable.)	Ref
July 1, 2010	Mike Rathje (Note: Rathje, who last played during the 2006–07 season, retired.)		Contract expiration (III)	
July 1, 2010	Michael Teslak (Note: Teslak was inactive during 2010–11 season.)		Contract expiration (UFA)	
July 7, 2010	Jared Ross	Atlanta Thrashers	Free agency (III)	
July 21, 2010	Danny Syvret	Anaheim Ducks	Free agency (VI)	
July 29, 2010	Mika Pyorala	Frolunda HC (SHL)	Free agency (III)	
August 9, 2010	Riley Cote		Retirement	
August 20, 2010	Arron Asham	Pittsburgh Penguins	Free agency (III)	
August 22, 2010	Sebastien Caron	Traktor Chelyabinsk (KHL)	Free agency (III)	
September 1, 2010	Joey Mormina	Red Bull Salzburg (EBEL)	Free agency (III)	
September 10, 2010	Jeremy Duchesne	Saint-Georges CRS Express (LNAH)	Free agency (UFA)	
September 16, 2010	Lukas Krajicek	Ocelari Trinec (ELH)	Free agency (III)	
September 27, 2010	Rob Bellamy	Elmira Jackals (ECHL)	Free agency (UFA)	
September 30, 2010	Josh Beaulieu	Rapid City Rush (CHL)	Free agency (UFA)	
October 4, 2010	Ryan Dingle	Victoria Salmon Kings (ECHL)	Free agency (VI)	
November 9, 2010	Sean Curry	Toledo Walleye (ECHL)	Free agency (III)	
November 15, 2010	Jason Ward	EHC Black Wings Linz (EBEL)	Free agency (III)	
February 7, 2011	Ray Emery	Anaheim Ducks	Free agency (III)	

=== Signings ===
Date	Player	Term	Contract type	Ref
June 15, 2010	Johan Backlund	2-year	Re-signing	
June 30, 2010	Michael Leighton	2-year	Re-signing	
July 1, 2010	Braydon Coburn	2-year	Re-signing	
July 13, 2010	Daniel Carcillo	1-year	Re-signing	
July 22, 2010	Matt Clackson	1-year	Re-signing	
July 22, 2010	David Laliberte	1-year	Re-signing	
July 22, 2010	Darroll Powe	1-year	Re-signing	
November 8, 2010	Claude Giroux	3-year	Extension	
November 13, 2010	Jeff Carter	11-year	Extension	
March 15, 2011	Oliver Lauridsen	2-year	Entry-level	

== Draft picks ==
Philadelphia's picks at the 2010 NHL entry draft, which was held at the Staples Center in Los Angeles on June 25–26, 2010. The Flyers traded their 2009 and 2010, 29th overall, first-round picks, Joffrey Lupul, Luca Sbisa and a conditional 2010 or 2011 third-round pick to the Anaheim Ducks for Ryan Dingle and Chris Pronger on June 26, 2009. They also traded their original second-round pick, 59th overall, and Denis Gauthier to the Los Angeles Kings for Patrik Hersley and Ned Lukacevic on July 1, 2008.

Round	Pick	Player	Position	Nationality	Team (league)	Notes
3	89	Michael Chaput	Center	Canada	Lewiston Maineiacs (QMJHL)	
4	119	Tye McGinn	Left wing	Canada	Gatineau Olympiques (QMJHL)	
5	149	Michael Parks	Right wing	United States	Cedar Rapids RoughRiders (USHL)	
6	179	Nick Luukko	Defense	United States	The Gunnery (USHS-CT)	
7	206	Ricard Blidstrand	Defense	Sweden	AIK IF Jr. (J20 SuperElit)	(Note: The Flyers traded Jon Matsumoto to the Carolina Hurricanes for the Washington Capitals' seventh-round pick, 206th overall, on June 26, 2010.)
7	209	Brendan Ranford	Left wing	Canada	Kamloops Blazers (WHL)	

== Farm teams ==
American Hockey League – Adirondack Phantoms (Standings)
ECHL – Greenville Road Warriors
