= 2010–11 Washington Capitals season =

NHL hockey team season

2010–11 Washington Capitals
- Southeast Division champions
- Division: 1st Southeast
- Conference: 1st Eastern
- 2010–11 record: 48–23–11
- Home record: 25–8–8
- Road record: 23–15–3
- Goals for: 224
- Goals against: 197

Team information
- General manager: George McPhee
- Coach: Bruce Boudreau
- Captain: Alexander Ovechkin
- Alternate captains: Nicklas Backstrom; Jason Chimera; Mike Knuble; Tom Poti
- Arena: Verizon Center

Team leaders
- Goals: Alexander Ovechkin (32)
- Assists: Ovechkin (53)
- Points: Ovechkin (85)
- Penalty minutes: Matt Hendricks (110)
- Plus/minus: Nicklas Backstrom; Ovechkin (+24)
- Wins: Michal Neuvirth (27)
- Goals against average: Braden Holtby (1.79)

The 2010–11 Washington Capitals season is the 37th season for the Washington Capitals in the National Hockey League (NHL). Despite the Capitals' first round exit in the 2010 Playoffs, ticket prices for this season were increased between 13 and 50 percent.

== Regular season ==
The Capitals finished the regular season having been shut out a league-high 11 times, tied with the Toronto Maple Leafs. Late into the season, they also set a franchise record for the fewest shots on goal attempted in a win, twelve in a 3–0 shutout win over the New Jersey Devils on March 18, 2011.

=== Divisional standings ===
Southeast Division
		GP	W	L	OTL	ROW	GF	GA	Pts
**1**	**z-Washington Capitals**	**82**	**48**	**23**	**11**	**43**	**224**	**197**	**107**
**2**	**Tampa Bay Lightning**	**82**	**46**	**25**	**11**	**40**	**247**	**240**	**103**
3	Carolina Hurricanes	82	40	31	11	35	236	239	91
4	Atlanta Thrashers	82	34	36	12	29	223	269	80
5	Florida Panthers	82	30	40	12	26	195	229	72

=== Conference standings ===
Eastern Conference
R		Div	GP	W	L	OTL	ROW	GF	GA	Pts
**1**	**z – Washington Capitals**	**SE**	**82**	**48**	**23**	**11**	**43**	**224**	**197**	107
**2**	**y – Philadelphia Flyers**	**AT**	**82**	**47**	**23**	**12**	**44**	**259**	**223**	106
**3**	**y – Boston Bruins**	**NE**	**82**	**46**	**25**	**11**	**44**	**246**	**195**	103
**4**	**Pittsburgh Penguins**	**AT**	**82**	**49**	**25**	**8**	**39**	**238**	**199**	106
**5**	**Tampa Bay Lightning**	**SE**	**82**	**46**	**25**	**11**	**40**	**247**	**240**	103
**6**	**Montreal Canadiens**	**NE**	**82**	**44**	**30**	**8**	**41**	**216**	**209**	96
**7**	**Buffalo Sabres**	**NE**	**82**	**43**	**29**	**10**	**38**	**245**	**229**	96
**8**	**New York Rangers**	**AT**	**82**	**44**	**33**	**5**	**35**	**233**	**198**	93
8.5
9	Carolina Hurricanes	SE	82	40	31	11	35	236	239	91
10	Toronto Maple Leafs	NE	82	37	34	11	32	218	251	85
11	New Jersey Devils	AT	82	38	39	5	35	174	209	81
12	Atlanta Thrashers	SE	82	34	36	12	29	223	269	80
13	Ottawa Senators	NE	82	32	40	10	30	192	250	74
14	New York Islanders	AT	82	30	39	13	26	229	264	73
15	Florida Panthers	SE	82	30	40	12	26	195	229	72

bold – qualified for playoffs; y – Won division; z – Placed first in conference (and division)
AT – Atlantic Division, NE – Northeast Division, SE – Southeast Division

== Schedule and results ==
=== Pre-season ===
2010 Pre-season: 5–1–0 (Home: 2–1–0; Road: 3–0–0)
#	Date	Visitor	Score	Home	OT	Decision	Record	Recap
1	September 22	Washington Capitals	6 – 2	Columbus Blue Jackets		Holtby	1-0-0
2	September 25	Washington Capitals	2 – 1	Nashville Predators		Neuvirth	2-0-0
3	September 28	Boston Bruins	2 – 3	Washington Capitals		Neuvirth	3-0-0
4	September 29	Washington Capitals	4 – 1	Boston Bruins		Holtby	4-0-0
5	October 1	Columbus Blue Jackets	3 – 5	Washington Capitals		Neuvirth	5-0-0
6	October 3	Nashville Predators	3 – 0	Washington Capitals		Sabourin	5-1-0

=== Regular season ===
October: 7–4–0 (Home: 4–1–0; Road: 3–3–0)
#	Date	Visitor	Score	Home	OT	Decision	Record	Points	Recap
1	8	Washington Capitals	2 – 4	Atlanta Thrashers		Neuvirth	0–1–0	0	Recap
2	9	New Jersey Devils	2 – 7	Washington Capitals		Neuvirth	1–1–0	2	Recap
3	11	Ottawa Senators	2 – 3	Washington Capitals	OT	Neuvirth	2–1–0	4	Recap
4	13	New York Islanders	1 – 2	Washington Capitals		Neuvirth	3–1–0	6	Recap
5	16	Washington Capitals	3 – 2	Nashville Predators	OT	Neuvirth	4–1–0	8	Recap
6	19	Boston Bruins	3 – 1	Washington Capitals		Neuvirth	4–2–0	8	Recap
7	21	Washington Capitals	1 – 4	Boston Bruins		Varlamov	4–3–0	8	Recap
8	23	Atlanta Thrashers	3 – 4	Washington Capitals	OT	Neuvirth	5–3–0	10	Recap
9	27	Washington Capitals	3 – 0	Carolina Hurricanes		Neuvirth	6–3–0	12	Recap
10	28	Washington Capitals	1 – 2	Minnesota Wild		Neuvirth	6–4–0	12	Recap
11	30	Washington Capitals	7 – 2	Calgary Flames		Neuvirth	7–4–0	14	Recap

November: 10–2–2 (Home: 8–0–1; Road: 2–2–1)
#	Date	Visitor	Score	Home	OT	Decision	Record	Points	Recap
12	3	Toronto Maple Leafs	4 – 5	Washington Capitals	SO	Neuvirth	8–4–0	16	Recap
13	5	Boston Bruins	3 – 5	Washington Capitals		Holtby	9–4–0	18	Recap
14	7	Philadelphia Flyers	2 – 3	Washington Capitals	OT	Holtby	10–4–0	20	Recap
15	9	Washington Capitals	5 – 3	New York Rangers		Neuvirth	11–4–0	22	Recap
16	11	Tampa Bay Lightning	3 – 6	Washington Capitals		Neuvirth	12–4–0	24	Recap
17	13	Washington Capitals	2 – 3	Buffalo Sabres	OT	Holtby	12–4–1	25	Recap
18	14	Atlanta Thrashers	4 – 6	Washington Capitals		Neuvirth	13–4–1	27	Recap
19	17	Buffalo Sabres	2 – 4	Washington Capitals		Neuvirth	14–4–1	29	Recap
20	19	Washington Capitals	0 – 5	Atlanta Thrashers		Neuvirth	14–5–1	29	Recap
21	20	Philadelphia Flyers	5 – 4	Washington Capitals	SO	Neuvirth	14–5–2	30	Recap
22	22	Washington Capitals	0 – 5	New Jersey Devils		Holtby	14–6–2	30	Recap
23	24	Washington Capitals	3 – 2	Carolina Hurricanes		Varlamov	15–6–2	32	Recap
24	26	Tampa Bay Lightning	0 – 6	Washington Capitals		Varlamov	16–6–2	34	Recap
25	28	Carolina Hurricanes	2 – 3	Washington Capitals	SO	Varlamov	17–6–2	36	Recap

December: 5–6–3 (Home: 2–4–3; Road: 3–2–0)
#	Date	Visitor	Score	Home	OT	Decision	Record	Points	Recap
26	1	Washington Capitals	4 – 1	St. Louis Blues		Varlamov	18–6–2	38	Recap
27	2	Washington Capitals	1 – 2	Dallas Stars		Neuvirth	18–7–2	38	Recap
28	4	Atlanta Thrashers	3 – 1	Washington Capitals		Varlamov	18–8–2	38	Recap
29	6	Toronto Maple Leafs	5 – 4	Washington Capitals	SO	Neuvirth	18–8–3	39	Recap
30	9	Florida Panthers	3 – 0	Washington Capitals		Varlamov	18–9–3	39	Recap
31	11	Colorado Avalanche	3 – 2	Washington Capitals		Neuvirth	18–10–3	39	Recap
32	12	Washington Capitals	0 – 7	New York Rangers		Varlamov	18–11–3	39	Recap
33	15	Anaheim Ducks	2 – 1	Washington Capitals	OT	Varlamov	18–11–4	40	Recap
34	18	Boston Bruins	3 – 2	Washington Capitals		Neuvirth	18–12–4	40	Recap
35	19	Washington Capitals	3 – 2	Ottawa Senators		Neuvirth	19–12–4	42	Recap
36	21	New Jersey Devils	1 – 5	Washington Capitals		Neuvirth	20–12–4	44	Recap
37	23	Pittsburgh Penguins	3 – 2	Washington Capitals	SO	Neuvirth	20–12–5	45	Recap
38	26	Washington Capitals	3 – 2	Carolina Hurricanes		Varlamov	21–12–5	47	Recap
39	28	Montreal Canadiens	0 – 3	Washington Capitals		Varlamov	22–12–5	49	Recap

January: 5–3–4 (Home: 2–1–2; Road: 3–2–2)
#	Date	Visitor	Score	Home	OT	Decision	Record	Points	Recap
40	1	Washington Capitals	3 – 1	Pittsburgh Penguins		Varlamov	23-12-5	51	Recap
41	4	Tampa Bay Lightning	1 – 0	Washington Capitals	OT	Varlamov	23-12-6	52	Recap
42	8	Florida Panthers	2 – 3	Washington Capitals		Varlamov	24-12-6	54	Recap
43	11	Washington Capitals	3 – 4	Florida Panthers	OT	Neuvirth	24-12-7	55	Recap
44	12	Washington Capitals	0 – 3	Tampa Bay Lightning		Varlamov	24-13-7	55	Recap
45	14	Vancouver Canucks	4 – 2	Washington Capitals		Varlamov	24-14-7	55	Recap
46	16	Ottawa Senators	1 – 3	Washington Capitals		Neuvirth	25-14-7	57	Recap
47	18	Washington Capitals	2 – 3	Philadelphia Flyers	OT	Varlamov	25-14-8	58	Recap
48	20	Washington Capitals	2 – 1	New York Islanders		Holtby	26-14-8	60	Recap
49	22	Washington Capitals	4 – 1	Toronto Maple Leafs		Holtby	27-14-8	62	Recap
50	24	New York Rangers	2 – 1	Washington Capitals	SO	Holtby	27-14-9	63	Recap
51	26	Washington Capitals	0 – 1	Atlanta Thrashers		Varlamov	27-15-9	63	Recap

February: 6–5–1 (Home: 1–3–1; Road: 5–2–0)
#	Date	Visitor	Score	Home	OT	Decision	Record	Points	Recap
52	1	Montreal Canadiens	3 – 2	Washington Capitals	SO	Varlamov	27–15–10	64	Recap
53	4	Washington Capitals	5 – 2	Tampa Bay Lightning		Varlamov	28–16–10	66	Recap
54	6	Pittsburgh Penguins	0 – 3	Washington Capitals		Neuvirth	29–16–10	68	Recap
55	8	San Jose Sharks	2 – 0	Washington Capitals		Neuvirth	29–16–10	68	Recap
56	12	Los Angeles Kings	4 – 1	Washington Capitals		Varlamov	29–16–10	68	Recap
57	14	Washington Capitals	2 – 3	Phoenix Coyotes		Neuvirth	29–17–10	68	Recap
58	16	Washington Capitals	7 – 6	Anaheim Ducks		Neuvirth	30–17–10	70	Recap
59	17	Washington Capitals	2 – 3	San Jose Sharks		Neuvirth	30–18–10	70	Recap
60	20	Washington Capitals	2 – 1	Buffalo Sabres		Varlamov	31–18–10	72	Recap
61	21	Washington Capitals	1 – 0	Pittsburgh Penguins		Neuvirth	32–18–10	74	Recap
62	22	New York Rangers	6 – 0	Washington Capitals		Neuvirth	32–19–10	74	Recap
63	26	Washington Capitals	3 – 2	New York Islanders		Neuvirth	33–20–10	76	Recap

March: 12–2–1 (Home: 6–0–1; Road: 6–2–0)
#	Date	Visitor	Score	Home	OT	Decision	Record	Points	Recap
64	1	New York Islanders	1 – 2	Washington Capitals	OT	Neuvirth	34–20–10	78	Recap
65	3	St. Louis Blues	2 – 3	Washington Capitals		Neuvirth	35–20–10	80	Recap
66	6	Washington Capitals	3 – 2	Florida Panthers	OT	Neuvirth	36–20–10	82	Recap
67	7	Washington Capitals	2 – 1	Tampa Bay Lightning	SO	Holtby	37–20–10	84	Recap
68	9	Edmonton Oilers	0 – 5	Washington Capitals		Holtby	38–20–10	86	Recap
69	11	Carolina Hurricanes	1 – 5	Washington Capitals		Holtby	39–20–10	88	Recap
70	13	Chicago Blackhawks	3 – 4	Washington Capitals	OT	Holtby	40–20–10	90	Recap
71	15	Washington Capitals	4 – 2	Montreal Canadiens		Holtby	41–20–10	92	Recap
72	16	Washington Capitals	2 – 3	Detroit Red Wings		Neuvirth	41–21–10	92	Recap
73	18	Washington Capitals	3 – 0	New Jersey Devils		Neuvirth	42–21–10	94	Recap
74	22	Washington Capitals	5 – 4	Philadelphia Flyers	SO	Neuvirth	43–21–10	96	Recap
75	25	Washington Capitals	0 – 2	Ottawa Senators		Varlamov	43–22–10	96	Recap
76	26	Washington Capitals	2 – 0	Montreal Canadiens		Holtby	44–22–10	98	Recap
77	29	Carolina Hurricanes	3 – 2	Washington Capitals	SO	Varlamov	44–22–11	99	Recap
78	31	Columbus Blue Jackets	3 – 4	Washington Capitals	OT	Neuvirth	45–22–11	101	Recap

April: 3–1–0 (Home: 1–0–0; Road: 2–1–0)
#	Date	Visitor	Score	Home	OT	Decision	Record	Points	Recap
79	2	Buffalo Sabres	4 – 5	Washington Capitals	OT	Neuvirth	46–22–11	103	Recap
80	5	Washington Capitals	3 – 2	Toronto Maple Leafs	SO	Neuvirth	47–22–11	105	Recap
81	6	Washington Capitals	5 – 2	Florida Panthers		Varlamov	48–22–11	107	Recap
82	9	Washington Capitals	0 – 1	Florida Panthers		Neuvirth	48–23–11	107	Recap

== Playoffs ==
The Capitals won the Southeast Division title for the fourth consecutive season. The Capitals also clinched as the Eastern Conference regular season champions. The Capitals played the New York Rangers in the opening round and won 4–1, but were swept by the Tampa Bay Lightning in the Eastern Conference Semifinals.

The Capitals' Game 4 double overtime victory in the first round over the New York Rangers is currently the longest playoff win in franchise history, lasting 92:36.

Key: Win Loss Clinch Playoff Series Eliminated from playoffs

2011 Stanley Cup Playoffs

Eastern Conference Quarter-finals: vs. (8) New York Rangers - Washington wins series 4-1
#	Date	Visitor	Score	Home	OT	Decision	Attendance	Series	Recap
1	April 13	New York Rangers	1 - 2	Washington Capitals	OT	Neuvirth	18,398	Capitals lead 1 - 0
2	April 15	New York Rangers	0 - 2	Washington Capitals		Neuvirth	18,398	Capitals lead 2 - 0
3	April 17	Washington Capitals	2 - 3	New York Rangers		Neuvirth	18,200	Capitals lead 2 - 1
4	April 20	Washington Capitals	4 - 3	New York Rangers	2OT	Neuvirth	18,200	Capitals lead 3 - 1
5	April 23	New York Rangers	1 - 3	Washington Capitals		Neuvirth	18,398	Capitals win 4 - 1

Eastern Conference Semi-finals: vs. (5) Tampa Bay Lightning - Tampa Bay wins series 4-0
#	Date	Visitor	Score	Home	OT	Decision	Attendance	Series	Recap
1	April 29	Tampa Bay Lightning	4 - 2	Washington Capitals		Neuvirth	18,398	Lightning lead 1 - 0
2	May 1	Tampa Bay Lightning	3 - 2	Washington Capitals	OT	Neuvirth	18,398	Lightning lead 2 - 0
3	May 3	Washington Capitals	3 - 4	Tampa Bay Lightning		Neuvirth	20,600	Lightning lead 3 - 0
4	May 4	Washington Capitals	3 - 5	Tampa Bay Lightning		Neuvirth	20,835	Lightning win 4 - 0

== Player statistics ==
=== Skaters ===
Note: GP = Games played; G = Goals; A = Assists; Pts = Points; +/− = Plus/minus; PIM = Penalty minutes

Regular season

Player	GP	G	A	Pts	+/−	PIM
Alexander Ovechkin	79	32	53	85	24	41
Nicklas Backstrom	77	18	47	65	24	40
Alexander Semin	65	28	26	54	22	71
Brooks Laich	82	16	32	48	14	46
Mike Knuble	79	24	16	40	10	36
John Carlson	82	7	30	37	21	44
Marcus Johansson	69	13	14	27	2	10
Jason Chimera	81	10	16	26	-10	64
Mike Green	49	8	16	24	6	48
Matt Hendricks	77	9	16	25	-2	110
Eric Fehr	52	10	10	20	0	16
Mathieu Perreault	35	7	7	14	-3	20
Karl Alzner	82	2	10	12	14	24
David Steckel^{‡}	57	5	6	11	-3	24
Matt Bradley	61	4	7	11	-3	68
John Erskine	73	4	7	11	1	94
Tomas Fleischmann^{‡}	23	4	6	10	3	10
Jeff Schultz	72	1	9	10	6	12
Boyd Gordon	60	3	6	9	-5	16
Tom Poti	21	2	5	7	-4	8
Jason Arnott^{†}	11	4	3	7	3	8
Dennis Wideman^{†}	14	1	6	7	7	6
Tyler Sloan	33	1	5	6	-6	14
Marco Sturm^{†}	18	1	6	7	0	6
Scott Hannan^{†}	55	1	4	5	3	28
Jay Beagle	31	2	1	3	-2	8
Andrew Gordon	9	1	1	2	-2	0
D. J. King	16	0	2	2	-3	30
Sean Collins	4	1	0	1	2	0
Brian Willsie	1	0	1	1	0	0
Brian Fahey	7	0	1	1	-1	2
Keith Aucoin	1	0	0	0	0	0

Playoffs

Player	GP	G	A	Pts	+/−	PIM
Alexander Ovechkin	9	5	5	10	-1	10
Brooks Laich	9	1	6	7	0	2
Jason Arnott	9	1	5	6	4	2
Alexander Semin	9	4	2	6	2	8
Mike Green	8	1	5	6	0	8
Marcus Johansson	9	2	4	6	-2	0
Jason Chimera	9	2	2	4	-3	2
Marco Sturm	9	1	2	3	1	4
John Carlson	9	2	1	3	-2	4
Mike Knuble	6	2	0	2	2	8
John Erskine	9	1	1	2	1	6
Nicklas Backstrom	9	0	2	2	0	4
Scott Hannan	9	0	1	1	1	2
Eric Fehr	5	1	0	1	3	0
Karl Alzner	9	0	1	1	-4	0
Matt Bradley	9	0	0	0	-3	4
Matt Hendricks	7	0	0	0	-2	4
Boyd Gordon	9	0	0	0	-1	6
Jeff Schultz	9	0	0	0	1	6
Sean Collins	1	0	0	0	0	0

=== Goaltenders ===
Note: GP = Games played; Min = Time on ice (minutes); W = Wins; L = Losses; OT = Overtime losses; GA = Goals against; GAA= Goals against average; SA= Shots against; SV= Saves; Sv% = Save percentage; SO= Shutouts

Regular season

Player	GP	Min	W	L	OT	GA	GAA	SA	Sv%	SO	G	A	PIM
Michal Neuvirth	48	2,689	27	12	4	110	2.45	1,283	.914	4	0	0	0
Semyon Varlamov	27	1,560	11	9	5	58	2.23	759	.924	2	0	0	2
Braden Holtby	14	736	10	2	2	22	1.79	332	.934	2	0	1	0

Playoffs

Player	GP	Min	W	L	GA	GAA	SA	Sv%	SO	G	A	PIM
Michal Neuvirth	9	590	4	5	23	2.34	261	.912	1	0	0	0

^{†}Denotes player spent time with another team before joining Capitals. Stats reflect time with the Capitals only.
^{‡}Traded mid-season
Bold/italics denotes franchise record

== Awards and records ==
=== Awards ===
Regular Season
Player	Award	Awarded
Michal Neuvirth	NHL Rookie of the Month	October 2010
Alexander Semin	NHL Third Star of the Week	November 15, 2010
Semyon Varlamov	NHL First Star of the Week	January 3, 2011
Braden Holtby	NHL First Star of the Week	March 14, 2011

=== Milestones ===
Regular Season
Player	Milestone	Reached
Marcus Johansson	1st Career NHL Game	October 8, 2010
Alexander Ovechkin	400th Career NHL Game	October 13, 2010
Brian Fahey	1st Career NHL Game	October 16, 2010
Marcus Johansson	1st Career NHL Goal; 1st Career NHL Point	October 19, 2010
Brooks Laich	400th Career NHL Game	October 21, 2010
Michal Neuvirth	1st Career NHL Shutout	October 27, 2010
Mike Knuble	900th Career NHL Game	October 30, 2010
Braden Holtby	1st Career NHL Game; 1st Career NHL Win	November 5, 2010
Brooks Laich	200th Career NHL Point	November 9, 2010
Nicklas Backstrom	200th Career NHL Assist	November 11, 2010
Eric Fehr	200th Career NHL Game	November 24, 2010
Brian Fahey	1st Career NHL Assist; 1st Career NHL Point	November 26, 2010
Marcus Johansson	1st Career NHL Assist	November 26, 2010
Tom Poti	800th Career NHL Game	December 12, 2010
Jason Chimera	200th Career NHL Point	December 21, 2010
Andrew Gordon	1st Career NHL Goal; 1st Career NHL Assist; 1st Career NHL Point	December 21, 2010
Mike Knuble	500th Career NHL Point	January 8, 2011
Matt Hendricks	100th Career NHL Game	January 11, 2011
Nicklas Backstrom	300th Career NHL Point	January 18, 2011
Karl Alzner	100th Career NHL Game	January 22, 2011
Scott Hannan	800th Career NHL Game	January 26, 2011
Matt Bradley	600th Career NHL Game	February 1, 2011
Nicklas Backstrom	300th Career NHL Game	February 6, 2011
Jeff Schultz	300th Career NHL Game	February 25, 2011
Alexander Ovechkin	300th Career NHL Assist	March 1, 2011
Jason Arnott	900th Career NHL Point	March 9, 2011
Alexander Ovechkin	600th Career NHL Point	March 9, 2011
Dennis Wideman	200th Career NHL Point	March 9, 2011
Braden Holtby	1st Career NHL Shutout	March 9, 2011
Brooks Laich	100th Career NHL Goal	March 15, 2011
John Carlson	100th Career NHL Game	March 31, 2011
Jason Arnott	400th Career NHL Goal	April 2, 2011
Alexander Ovechkin	300th Career NHL Goal	April 5, 2011

=== Milestones ===
Playoffs
Player	Milestone	Reached
Marcus Johansson	1st Career NHL Playoff Game	April 13, 2011
Michal Neuvirth	1st Career NHL Playoff Game; 1st Career NHL Playoff Win	April 13, 2011
Marcus Johansson	1st Career NHL Playoff Assist; 1st Career NHL Playoff Point	April 15, 2011
Michal Neuvirth	1st Career NHL Playoff Shutout	April 15, 2011
Karl Alzner	1st Career NHL Playoff Assist; 1st Career NHL Playoff Point	April 20, 2011
Marcus Johansson	1st Career NHL Playoff Goal	April 20, 2011
Sean Collins	1st Career NHL Playoff Game	May 4, 2011
John Erskine	1st Career NHL Playoff Goal	May 4, 2011

== Transactions ==
The Capitals have been involved in the following transactions during the 2010–11 season.

=== Trades ===
Date	Details
June 26, 2010	To Toronto Maple Leafs 4th-round pick (116th overall) in 2010 – Petter Granberg; 5th-round pick in 2010 – Daniel Brodin	To Washington Capitals 4th-round pick (112th overall) in 2010 – Philipp Grubauer
July 28, 2010	To St. Louis Blues Stefan Della Rovere	To Washington Capitals D. J. King
November 30, 2010	To Colorado Avalanche Tomas Fleischmann	To Washington Capitals Scott Hannan
February 28, 2011	To Florida Panthers Jake Hauswirth; 3rd-round pick in 2011 – Jonathan Racine	To Washington Capitals Dennis Wideman
February 28, 2011	To New Jersey Devils Dave Steckel; 2nd-round pick in 2012 – Raphael Bussieres	To Washington Capitals Jason Arnott

=== Free agents acquired ===
Player	Former team	Contract terms
Dany Sabourin	Providence Bruins	1 year, $525.000
Kyle Greentree	Chicago Blackhawks	2 years, $1.025 million
Brian Fahey	Colorado Avalanche	1 year, $500,000
Brian Willsie	Colorado Avalanche	1 year, $525,000
Brandon Anderson	Lethbridge Hurricanes	3 years, $1.62 million entry-level contract
Matt Hendricks	Colorado Avalanche	1 year, $575,000
Todd Ford	Hershey Bears	1 year, $500,000
Garret Mitchell	Regina Pats	3 years, $1.725 million entry-level contract

=== Free agents lost ===
Player	New team	Contract terms
Milan Jurcina	New York Islanders	1 year, $1 million
Kyle Wilson	Columbus Blue Jackets	1 year, $600,000
Alexandre Giroux	Edmonton Oilers	1 year, $500,000
Joe Corvo	Carolina Hurricanes	2 years, $4.5 million
Chris Bourque	Atlant Moscow Oblast	2 years, $1 million
Shaone Morrisonn	Buffalo Sabres	2 years, $4.15 million
Eric Belanger	Phoenix Coyotes	1 year, $750,000
Jose Theodore	Minnesota Wild	1 year, $1.1 million
Brendan Morrison	Calgary Flames	1 year, $725,000

=== Claimed via waivers ===
Player	Former team	Date claimed off waivers
Marco Sturm	Los Angeles Kings	February 26, 2011

=== Lost via waivers ===
Player	New team	Date claimed off waivers

=== Player signings ===
Player	Contract terms
Nicklas Backstrom	10 years, $67 million
Marcus Johansson	3 years, $2.7 million entry-level contract
Boyd Gordon	1 year, $800,000
Jeff Schultz	4 years, $11 million
Eric Fehr	2 years, $4.4 million
Andrew Gordon	1 year, $500,000
Andrew Joudrey	1 year, $500,000
Patrick McNeill	1 year, $500,000
Zach Miskovic	1 year, $500,000
Jay Beagle	2 years, $1.025 million
Tomas Fleischmann	1 year, $2.6 million
Tom Poti	2 years, $5.75 million contract extension
Michal Neuvirth	2 years, $2.3 million contract extension
Philipp Grubauer	3 years, $1.835 million entry-level contract
Brett Flemming	3 years, $1.7 million entry-level contract
John Erskine	2 years, $3 million contract extension
Alexander Semin	1 year, $6.7 million contract extension
Matt Hendricks	2 years, $1.6 million contract extension
Dmitri Orlov	3 years, $2.13 million entry-level contract
Mike Knuble	1 year, $2 million contract extension

== Draft picks ==
Washington's picks at the 2010 NHL entry draft in Los Angeles, California.

Round	#	Player	Position	Nationality	College/Junior/Club team (League)
1	26	Evgeny Kuznetsov	C	Russia	Traktor Chelyabinsk (KHL)
3	86	Stanislav Galiev	RW	Russia	Saint John Sea Dogs (QMJHL)
4	112 (from Phoenix via Toronto)	Philipp Grubauer	G	Germany	Windsor Spitfires (OHL)
5	142 (from Phoenix)	Caleb Herbert	C	United States	Bloomington Jefferson High School (USHS-MN)
6	176	Samuel Carrier	RW	Canada	Lewiston Maineiacs (QMJHL)

== Farm teams ==
=== Hershey Bears ===
The Capitals' American Hockey League affiliate will remain to be the Hershey Bears in the 2010–11 season.

=== South Carolina Stingrays ===
The South Carolina Stingrays remain Washington's ECHL affiliate for the 2010–11 season.

== See also ==
- 2010–11 NHL season
