= 2010–11 Toronto Maple Leafs season =

NHL hockey team season

2010–11 Toronto Maple Leafs
- Division: 4th Northeast
- Conference: 10th Eastern
- 2010–11 record: 37–34–11
- Home record: 18–15–8
- Road record: 19–19–3
- Goals for: 218
- Goals against: 251

Team information
- General manager: Brian Burke
- Coach: Ron Wilson
- Captain: Dion Phaneuf
- Alternate captains: Colby Armstrong (Feb.–Apr.); Francois Beauchemin (Oct.–Feb.); Mikhail Grabovski (Feb.–Apr.); Tomas Kaberle (Oct.–Feb.); Mike Komisarek; Luke Schenn (Feb.–Mar.)
- Arena: Air Canada Centre
- Average attendance: 19,354 (41 games, 102.9% capacity)

Team leaders
- Goals: Phil Kessel (32)
- Assists: Clarke MacArthur (41)
- Points: Phil Kessel (64)
- Penalty minutes: Colton Orr (128)
- Plus/minus: Mikhail Grabovski (+14)
- Wins: James Reimer (20)
- Goals against average: Reimer (2.60)

The 2010–11 Toronto Maple Leafs season was the 94th season for the National Hockey League (NHL) franchise that was established on November 22, 1917, and its 84th season since adopting the Maple Leafs name in February 1927.

The Maple Leafs posted a regular season record of 37 wins, 34 losses and 11 overtime/shootout losses for 85 points, failing to qualify for the Stanley Cup playoffs for the sixth consecutive season for the first time in franchise history.

== Draft ==
The Maple Leafs did not have a first round selection in the 2010 NHL entry draft, having traded it to the Boston Bruins in the Phil Kessel deal. The selection ended up being the second overall pick, which the Bruins used to select Tyler Seguin. The Leafs made their first selection in the second round, having traded Jimmy Hayes to the Chicago Blackhawks for the 43rd overall pick, used on Bradley Ross of the Portland Winterhawks. After Ross, the Leafs made six other selections in the later rounds of the draft, including Greg McKegg, Sondre Olden, Petter Granberg, Daniel Brodin, Sam Carrick and Josh Nicholls.

== Off-season ==
On June 14, 2010, general manager Brian Burke held a press conference to unveil the team's new sweaters for the 2010–11 season and also named Dion Phaneuf the 18th captain of the Toronto Maple Leafs.

== Regular season ==
The Maple Leafs started the season significantly better than in 2009–10. On October 7, 2010, the Maple Leafs won their first home opener since October 7, 2000. On October 15, 2010, the Maple Leafs won their fourth consecutive game, beating the New York Rangers 4–3 on the road. The Leafs had started a regular season with four consecutive wins since the 1993–94 season, when they won their first 10 games.

Over the 82-game regular season, the Leafs were shut-out a league-high 11 times, tied with the Washington Capitals.

== Playoffs ==
The Maple Leafs attempted to make the playoffs for the first time since the 2003–04 season. They were officially eliminated from playoff contention on April 5, 2011, when the Buffalo Sabres won against the Tampa Bay Lightning 4–2, shortly before Toronto lost to the Washington Capitals in a shoot-out. The Leafs hold the longest active Stanley Cup Final drought streak not having competed in the finals since the 1966–67 NHL season. They also are tied with the Los Angeles Kings and the St. Louis Blues for the longest drought without a Stanley Cup until the Kings won the Stanley Cup in 2012, followed by the Blues in 2019. In the 2009–10 season, the Chicago Blackhawks ended the longest drought without winning a Stanley Cup at that time, not having won the Stanley Cup since the 1960–61 season.

== Standings ==
Northeast Division
		GP	W	L	OTL	ROW	GF	GA	Pts
**1**	**y – Boston Bruins**	**82**	**46**	**25**	**11**	**44**	**246**	**195**	**103**
**2**	**Montreal Canadiens**	**82**	**44**	**30**	**8**	**41**	**216**	**209**	**96**
**3**	**Buffalo Sabres**	**82**	**43**	**29**	**10**	**38**	**245**	**229**	**96**
4	Toronto Maple Leafs	82	37	34	11	32	218	251	85
5	Ottawa Senators	82	32	40	10	30	192	250	74

Eastern Conference
R		Div	GP	W	L	OTL	ROW	GF	GA	Pts
**1**	**z – Washington Capitals**	**SE**	**82**	**48**	**23**	**11**	**43**	**224**	**197**	107
**2**	**y – Philadelphia Flyers**	**AT**	**82**	**47**	**23**	**12**	**44**	**259**	**223**	106
**3**	**y – Boston Bruins**	**NE**	**82**	**46**	**25**	**11**	**44**	**246**	**195**	103
**4**	**Pittsburgh Penguins**	**AT**	**82**	**49**	**25**	**8**	**39**	**238**	**199**	106
**5**	**Tampa Bay Lightning**	**SE**	**82**	**46**	**25**	**11**	**40**	**247**	**240**	103
**6**	**Montreal Canadiens**	**NE**	**82**	**44**	**30**	**8**	**41**	**216**	**209**	96
**7**	**Buffalo Sabres**	**NE**	**82**	**43**	**29**	**10**	**38**	**245**	**229**	96
**8**	**New York Rangers**	**AT**	**82**	**44**	**33**	**5**	**35**	**233**	**198**	93
8.5
9	Carolina Hurricanes	SE	82	40	31	11	35	236	239	91
10	Toronto Maple Leafs	NE	82	37	34	11	32	218	251	85
11	New Jersey Devils	AT	82	38	39	5	35	174	209	81
12	Atlanta Thrashers	SE	82	34	36	12	29	223	269	80
13	Ottawa Senators	NE	82	32	40	10	30	192	250	74
14	New York Islanders	AT	82	30	39	13	26	229	264	73
15	Florida Panthers	SE	82	30	40	12	26	195	229	72

bold – qualified for playoffs; y – Won division; z – Placed first in conference (and division)
AT – Atlantic Division, NE – Northeast Division, SE – Southeast Division

== Schedule and results ==
=== Pre-season ===
2010 pre-season game log: 5–3–1 (home: 3–1–1; road: 2–2–0)

Game	Date	Opponent	Score	Location	Decision	Record	Recap
1	September 21	Ottawa Senators	0–5	Air Canada Centre	Gustavsson	0–1–0	
2	September 22	Ottawa Senators	4–1	Air Canada Centre	Reimer	1–1–0	
3	September 23	@ Philadelphia Flyers	3–2 (SO)	John Labatt Centre	Gustavsson	2–1–0	
4	September 24	Philadelphia Flyers	3–4 (SO)	Air Canada Centre	Giguere	2–1–1	
5	September 25	@ Buffalo Sabres	1–3	HSBC Arena	Gustavsson	2–2–1	
6	September 27	Buffalo Sabres	5–4	Air Canada Centre	Gustavsson	3–2–1	
7	September 29	@ Ottawa Senators	4–3	Scotiabank Place	Giguere	4–2–1	
8	October 1	@ Detroit Red Wings	3–7	Joe Louis Arena	Rynnas	4–3–1	
9	October 2	Detroit Red Wings	4–2	Air Canada Centre	Giguere	5–3–1	

=== Regular season ===
2010–11 Game Log: 37–32–11, 85 Points (home: 19–14–8; road: 18–18–3)
October: 5–4–1, 11 Points (home: 3–2–1; road: 2–2–0)

Game	October	Opponent	Score	Location (Attendance)	Record	Points	Decision
1	7	Montreal Canadiens	3–2	Air Canada Centre (19,646)	1–0–0	2	Giguere
2	9	Ottawa Senators	5–1	Air Canada Centre (19,157)	2–0–0	4	Giguere
3	13	@ Pittsburgh Penguins	4–3	Consol Energy Center (18,112)	3–0–0	6	Gustavsson
4	15	@ New York Rangers	4–3 (OT)	Madison Square Garden (18,200)	4–0–0	8	Giguere
5	18	New York Islanders	1–2 (OT)	Air Canada Centre (19,086)	4–0–1	9	Giguere
6	21	New York Rangers	1–2	Air Canada Centre (19,310)	4–1–1	9	Gustavsson
7	23	@ Philadelphia Flyers	2–5	Wells Fargo Center (19,382)	4–2–1	9	Giguere
8	26	Florida Panthers	3–1	Air Canada Centre (19,239)	5–2–1	11	Giguere
9	28	@ Boston Bruins	0–2	TD Garden (17,565)	5–3–1	11	Gustavsson
10	30	New York Rangers	0–2	Air Canada Centre (19,063)	5–4–1	11	Giguere

November: 3–7–3, 9 Points (home: 3–2–2; road: 0–5–1)

Game	November	Opponent	Score	Location/Attendance	Record	Points	Decision
11	2	Ottawa Senators	2–3	Air Canada Centre (19,409)	5–5–1	11	Giguere
12	3	@ Washington Capitals	4–5 (SO)	Verizon Center (18,398)	5–5–2	12	Gustavsson
13	6	Buffalo Sabres	2–3 (SO)	Air Canada Centre (19,329)	5–5–3	13	Giguere
14	9	@ Tampa Bay Lightning	0–4	St. Pete Times Forum (16,791)	5–6–3	13	Giguere
15	10	@ Florida Panthers	1–4	BankAtlantic Center (15,243)	5–7–3	13	Gustavsson
16	13	Vancouver Canucks	3–5	Air Canada Centre (19,534)	5–8–3	13	Giguere
17	16	Nashville Predators	5–4	Air Canada Centre (19,069)	6–8–3	15	Giguere
18	18	New Jersey Devils	3–1	Air Canada Centre (19,271)	7–8–3	17	Gustavsson
19	20	@ Montreal Canadiens	0–2	Bell Centre (21,273)	7–9–3	17	Gustavsson
20	22	Dallas Stars	4–1	Air Canada Centre (19,266)	8–9–3	19	Gustavsson
21	26	@ Buffalo Sabres	1–3	HSBC Arena (18,004)	8–10–3	19	Gustavsson
22	27	@ Ottawa Senators	0–3	Scotiabank Place (20,275)	8–11–3	19	Gustavsson
23	30	Tampa Bay Lightning	3–4 (OT)	Air Canada Centre (19,063)	8–11–4	20	Gustavsson

December: 5–8–0, 10 Points (home: 2–5–0; road: 3–3–0)

Game	December	Opponent	Score	Location/Attendance	Record	Points	Decision
24	2	Edmonton Oilers	0–5	Air Canada Centre (19,465)	8–12–4	20	Gustavsson
25	4	Boston Bruins	3–2 (SO)	Air Canada Centre (19,483)	9–12–4	22	Giguere
26	6	@ Washington Capitals	5–4 (SO)	Verizon Center (18,398)	10–12–4	24	Gustavsson
27	8	@ Pittsburgh Penguins	2–5	Consol Energy Center (18,158)	10–13–4	24	Gustavsson
28	9	Philadelphia Flyers	1–4	Air Canada Centre (19,365)	10–14–4	24	Giguere
29	11	Montreal Canadiens	3–1	Air Canada Centre (19,656)	11–14–4	26	Giguere
30	14	@ Edmonton Oilers	4–1	Rexall Place (16,839)	12–14–4	28	Giguere
31	16	@ Calgary Flames	2–5	Pengrowth Saddledome (19,289)	12–15–4	28	Giguere
32	18	@ Vancouver Canucks	1–4	Rogers Arena (18,860)	12–16–4	28	Gustavsson
33	20	Atlanta Thrashers	3–6	Air Canada Centre (19,301)	12–17–4	28	Gustavsson
34	26	@ New Jersey Devils	4–1	Prudential Center (5,329)	13–17–4	30	Gustavsson
35	28	Carolina Hurricanes	3–4	Air Canada Centre (19,309)	13–18–4	30	Gustavsson
36	30	Columbus Blue Jackets	2–3	Air Canada Centre (19,148)	13–19–4	30	Gustavsson

January: 6–6–1, 13 Points (home: 2–2–1; road: 4–4–0)

Game	January	Opponent	Score	Location/Attendance	Record	Points	Decision
37	1	@ Ottawa Senators	5–1	Scotiabank Place (20,027)	14–19–4	32	Reimer
38	3	Boston Bruins	1–2	Air Canada Centre (19,052)	14–20–4	32	Reimer
39	6	St. Louis Blues	6–5 (SO)	Air Canada Centre (19,283)	15–20–4	34	Gustavsson
40	7	@ Atlanta Thrashers	9–3	Philips Arena (14,592)	16–20–4	36	Reimer
41	10	@ Los Angeles Kings	3–2	Staples Center (17,834)	17–20–4	38	Reimer
42	11	@ San Jose Sharks	4–2	HP Pavilion (17,562)	18–20–4	40	Reimer
43	13	@ Phoenix Coyotes	1–5	Jobing.com Arena (11,205)	18–21–4	40	Reimer
44	15	Calgary Flames	1–2 (SO)	Air Canada Centre (19,462)	18–21–5	41	Giguere
45	19	@ New York Rangers	0–7	Madison Square Garden (18,200)	18–22–5	41	Gustavsson
46	20	Anaheim Ducks	5–2	Air Canada Centre (19,399)	19–22–5	43	Giguere
47	22	Washington Capitals	1–4	Air Canada Centre (19,554)	19–23–5	43	Giguere
48	24	@ Carolina Hurricanes	4–6	RBC Center (16,201)	19–24–5	43	Giguere
49	25	@ Tampa Bay Lightning	0–2	St. Pete Times Forum (14,335)	19–25–5	43	Reimer

February: 8–2–4, 20 Points (home: 4–0–3; road: 4–2–1)

Game	February	Opponent	Score	Location/Attendance	Record	Points	Decision
50	1	Florida Panthers	4–3 (SO)	Air Canada Centre (19,018)	20–25–5	45	Giguere
51	3	Carolina Hurricanes	3–0	Air Canada Centre (19,220)	21–25–5	47	Reimer
52	5	@ Buffalo Sabres	2–6	HSBC Arena (18,264)	21–26–5	47	Reimer
53	7	Atlanta Thrashers	5–4	Air Canada Centre (19,104)	22–26–5	49	Giguere
54	8	@ New York Islanders	5–3	Nassau Veterans Memorial Coliseum (7,249)	23–26–5	51	Reimer
55	10	New Jersey Devils	1–2 (OT)	Air Canada Centre (19,260)	23–26–6	52	Reimer
56	12	@ Montreal Canadiens	0–3	Bell Centre (21,273)	23–27–6	52	Giguere
57	15	@ Boston Bruins	4–3	TD Garden (17,565)	24–27–6	54	Reimer
58	16	@ Buffalo Sabres	2–1	HSBC Arena (18,414)	25–27–6	56	Reimer
59	19	Ottawa Senators	0–1 (SO)	Air Canada Centre (19,460)	25–27–7	57	Reimer
60	22	New York Islanders	2–1	Air Canada Centre (19,459)	26–27–7	59	Reimer
61	24	@ Montreal Canadiens	5–4	Bell Centre (21,273)	27–27–7	61	Reimer
62	26	Pittsburgh Penguins	5–6 (SO)	Air Canada Centre (19,551)	27–27–8	62	Reimer
63	27	@ Atlanta Thrashers	2–3 (OT)	Philips Arena (13,147)	27–27–9	63	Giguere

March: 9–5–1, 19 Points (home: 4–3–0; road: 5–2–1)

Game	March	Opponent	Score	Location/Attendance	Record	Points	Decision
64	2	Pittsburgh Penguins	3–2 (OT)	Air Canada Centre (19,473)	28–27–9	65	Reimer
65	3	@ Philadelphia Flyers	3–2	Wells Fargo Center (19,811)	29–27–9	67	Reimer
66	5	Chicago Blackhawks	3–5	Air Canada Centre (19,646)	29–28–9	67	Reimer
67	8	@ New York Islanders	3–4 (OT)	Nassau Veterans Memorial Coliseum (9,217)	29–28–10	68	Reimer
68	10	Philadelphia Flyers	2–3	Air Canada Centre (19,475)	29–29–10	68	Reimer
69	12	Buffalo Sabres	4–3	Air Canada Centre (19,347)	30–29–10	70	Reimer
70	14	Tampa Bay Lightning	2–6	Air Canada Centre (19,410)	30–30–10	70	Reimer
71	16	@ Carolina Hurricanes	3–1	RBC Center (15,220)	31–30–10	72	Reimer
72	17	@ Florida Panthers	0–4	BankAtlantic Center (16,970)	31–31–10	72	Giguere
73	19	Boston Bruins	5–2	Air Canada Centre (19,512)	32–31–10	74	Reimer
74	22	@ Minnesota Wild	3–0	Xcel Energy Center (18,761)	33–31–10	76	Reimer
75	24	@ Colorado Avalanche	4–3	Pepsi Center (14,364)	34–31–10	78	Reimer
76	26	@ Detroit Red Wings	2–4	Joe Louis Arena (20,066)	34–32–10	78	Reimer
77	29	Buffalo Sabres	4–3	Air Canada Centre (19,483)	35–32–10	80	Reimer
78	31	@ Boston Bruins	4–3 (SO)	TD Garden (17,565)	36–32–10	82	Reimer

April: 1–2–1, 3 Points (home: 0–1–1; road: 1–1–0)

Game	April	Opponent	Score	Location/Attendance	Record	Points	Decision
79	2	@ Ottawa Senators	4–2	Scotiabank Place (19,243)	37–32–10	84	Reimer
80	5	Washington Capitals	2–3 (SO)	Air Canada Centre (19,509)	37–32–11	85	Reimer
81	6	@ New Jersey Devils	2–4	Prudential Center (14,207)	37–33–11	85	Reimer
82	9	Montreal Canadiens	1–4	Air Canada Centre (19,676)	37–34–11	85	Reimer

== Player statistics ==
Final stats

=== Skaters ===
Regular season
Player	GP	G	A	Pts	+/-	PIM
Phil Kessel	82	32	32	64	−20	24
Clarke MacArthur	82	21	41	62	−3	37
Mikhail Grabovski	81	29	29	58	14	60
Nikolai Kulemin	82	30	27	57	7	26
Tomas Kaberle^{‡}	58	3	35	38	−2	16
Kris Versteeg^{‡}	52	14	21	35	−13	29
Tyler Bozak	82	15	17	32	−29	14
Dion Phaneuf	66	8	22	30	−2	88
Colby Armstrong	50	8	15	23	−1	38
Luke Schenn	82	5	17	22	−7	34
Tim Brent	79	8	12	20	−4	33
Carl Gunnarsson	68	4	16	20	−2	14
Joffrey Lupul^{†}	28	9	9	18	−7	19
Joey Crabb	48	3	12	15	−1	24
Darryl Boyce	46	5	8	13	8	33
Nazem Kadri	29	3	9	12	−3	8
Francois Beauchemin^{‡}	54	2	10	12	−4	16
Mike Komisarek	75	1	9	10	−8	86
Mike Brown	50	3	5	8	1	69
Fredrik Sjostrom	66	2	3	5	−5	14
Brett Lebda	41	1	3	4	−14	14
Jay Rosehill	26	1	2	3	−6	71
John Mitchell^{‡}	23	2	1	3	−7	12
Colton Orr	46	2	0	2	−1	128
Keith Aulie	40	2	0	2	−1	32
Michael Zigomanis	8	0	1	1	0	4
Matt Lashoff	11	0	1	1	1	6
Joe Colborne	1	0	1	1	1	0
Korbinian Holzer	2	0	0	0	−1	2
Luca Caputi	7	0	0	0	−2	4
Matt Frattin	1	0	0	0	−1	0
Christian Hanson	6	0	0	0	0	4
Marcel Mueller	3	0	0	0	0	2

=== Goaltenders ===
Regular season
Player	GP	GS	TOI	W	L	OT	GA	GAA	SA	SV%	SO	G	A	PIM
James Reimer	37	35	2080	20	10	5	90	2.60	1134	.921	3	0	1	2
Jean-Sebastien Giguere	33	26	1633	11	11	4	78	2.87	777	.900	0	0	0	4
Jonas Gustavsson	23	21	1242	6	13	2	68	3.29	620	.890	0	0	0	0

^{†}Denotes player spent time with another team before joining Maple Leafs. Stats reflect time with Maple Leafs only.
^{‡}Traded mid-season.
Bold/italics denotes franchise record.

== Awards and records ==
=== Awards ===
Regular Season
Player	Award	Reached
Phil Kessel	NHL First Star of the Week	February 28, 2011
James Reimer	NHL Rookie of the Month	March 2011

=== Milestones ===
Regular Season
Player	Milestone	Reached
Phil Kessel	100th Career NHL Goal	October 15, 2010
Mike Komisarek	400th Career NHL Game	October 18, 2010
Tim Brent	1st Career NHL Assist	October 26, 2010
Phil Kessel	300th Career NHL Game	October 26, 2010
Fredrik Sjostrom	100th Career NHL Point	October 26, 2010
Jean-Sebastien Giguere	500th Career NHL Game	November 2, 2010
Mikhail Grabovski	100th Career NHL Point	November 6, 2010
Korbinian Holzer	1st Career NHL Game	November 6, 2010
Clarke MacArthur	100th Career NHL Point	November 10, 2010
Keith Aulie	1st Career NHL Game	November 13, 2010
Nazem Kadri	1st Career NHL Assist; 1st Career NHL Point	November 16, 2010
Phil Kessel	200th Career NHL Point	December 14, 2010
Kris Versteeg	200th Career NHL Game	December 16, 2010
Tomas Kaberle	500th Career NHL Point	December 20, 2010
James Reimer	1st Career NHL Game	December 20, 2010
Darryl Boyce	1st Career NHL Assist; 1st Career NHL Point	December 30, 2010
Darryl Boyce	1st Career NHL Goal	January 1, 2011
Mikhail Grabovski	200th Career NHL Game	January 1, 2011
James Reimer	1st Career NHL Win	January 1, 2011
Ron Wilson	600th Career Win (coach)	January 11, 2011
Nikolai Kulemin	100th Career NHL Point	January 15, 2011
Marcel Mueller	1st Career NHL Game	January 15, 2011
Francois Beauchemin	100th Career NHL Assist	January 24, 2011
Phil Kessel	100th Career NHL Assist	January 24, 2011
Nikolai Kulemin	200th Career NHL Game	January 25, 2011
James Reimer	1st Career NHL Shutout	February 3, 2011
Luke Schenn	200th Career NHL Game	February 3, 2011
Colby Armstrong	400th Career NHL Game	February 22, 2011
Tyler Bozak	100th Career NHL Game	February 27, 2011
Colby Armstrong	200th Career NHL Point	March 3, 2011
Keith Aulie	1st Career NHL Goal; 1st Career NHL Point	March 8, 2011
Carl Gunnarsson	100th Career NHL Game	March 16, 2011
Nazem Kadri	1st Career NHL Goal	March 19, 2011
Joe Colborne	1st Career NHL Game; 1st Career NHL Assist; 1st Career NHL Point	April 9, 2011
Matt Frattin	1st Career NHL Game	April 9, 2011

== Transactions ==
The Maple Leafs have been involved in the following transactions during the 2010–11 season.

=== Trades ===
Date	Details
June 26, 2010	To Chicago Blackhawks Jimmy Hayes	To Toronto Maple Leafs 2nd-round pick in 2010
June 26, 2010	To Anaheim Ducks 5th-round pick in 2010	To Toronto Maple Leafs Mike Brown
June 26, 2010	To Los Angeles Kings 3rd-round pick in 2012	To Toronto Maple Leafs 3rd-round pick in 2010
June 26, 2010	To Washington Capitals 4th-round pick (112th overall) in 2010	To Toronto Maple Leafs 4th-round pick (116th overall) in 2010; 5th-round pick (146th overall) in 2010
June 26, 2010	To Edmonton Oilers 7th-round pick in 2010	To Toronto Maple Leafs 6th-round pick in 2011
June 30, 2010	To Chicago Blackhawks Viktor Stalberg; Chris DiDomenico; Philippe Paradis	To Toronto Maple Leafs Kris Versteeg; Bill Sweatt
August 27, 2010	To Tampa Bay Lightning Alex Berry; Stefano Giliati	To Toronto Maple Leafs Matt Lashoff
January 13, 2011	To Dallas Stars Mikhail Stefanovich	To Toronto Maple Leafs Fabian Brunnstrom
February 9, 2011	To Anaheim Ducks Francois Beauchemin	To Toronto Maple Leafs Joffrey Lupul; Jake Gardiner; Conditional 4th-round pick in 2013 (Note: Condition satisfied.)
February 14, 2011	To Philadelphia Flyers Kris Versteeg	To Toronto Maple Leafs 1st-round pick in 2011; 3rd-round pick in 2011
February 15, 2011	To Anaheim Ducks Conditional 7th-round pick in 2011 (Note: Condition not satisfied.)	To Toronto Maple Leafs Aaron Voros
February 18, 2011	To Boston Bruins Tomas Kaberle	To Toronto Maple Leafs 1st-round pick in 2011; Conditional 2nd-round pick in 2012 (Note: Condition satisfied.); Joe Colborne
February 28, 2011	To New York Rangers John Mitchell	To Toronto Maple Leafs 7th-round pick in 2012

=== Free agents acquired ===
Player	Former team	Contract terms
Jussi Rynnas	Assat (SM-liiga)	Two-year, $1.8 million entry-level contract
Ben Scrivens	Cornell University	One-year, $690,000 entry-level contract
Colby Armstrong	Atlanta Thrashers	Three-year, $9 million contract
Brett Lebda	Detroit Red Wings	Two-year, $2.9 million contract
Marcel Mueller	Kolner Haie	Two-year, $2.225 million entry-level contract
Joey Crabb	Chicago Blackhawks	One-year, $525,000 contract
Michael Zigomanis	Djurgardens IF	One-year, $500,000 contract
Danny Richmond	Chicago Blackhawks	One-year, $555,000 contract
Clarke MacArthur	Atlanta Thrashers	One-year, $1.1 million
Andrew Crescenzi	Kitchener Rangers	Three-year, $1.725 million entry-level contract
Tyler Brenner	Rochester Institute of Technology	Two-year, $1.8 million entry-level contract
Mark Owuya	Djurgardens IF	Two-year, $1.8 million entry-level contract

=== Free agents lost ===
Player	New team	Contract terms
Rickard Wallin	Farjestad BK	Four-year contract
Jonas Frogren	Farjestad BK	Four-year contract
Ben Ondrus	Edmonton Oilers	One-year, $550,000 contract
Jamie Lundmark	Nashville Predators	One-year, $600,000 contract
Garnet Exelby	Chicago Blackhawks	1 year, $500,000

=== Claimed via waivers ===
Player	Former team	Date claimed off waivers

=== Lost via waivers ===
Player	New team	Date claimed off waivers

=== Lost via retirement ===
Player
Mike Van Ryn

=== Player signings ===
Player	Contract terms
Korbinian Holzer	Two-year, $1.19 million entry-level contract
Nikolay Kulemin	Two-year, $4.7 million contract extension
John Mitchell	One-year, $725,000 contract
Jerry D'Amigo	Three-year, $2.7 million entry-level contract
Christian Hanson	One-year, $650,000 contract
Mike Brown	Three-year $2.21 million contract extension
Jake Gardiner	Three-year, $2.625 million entry-level contract
Greg McKegg	Three-year, $2.07 million entry-level contract
Matt Frattin	Two-year, $1.75 million entry-level contract

== Draft picks ==
Toronto's picks at the 2010 NHL entry draft in Los Angeles.

Round	Pick	Player	Position	Nationality	Team (League)
2	43 (from Calgary via Chicago)	Bradley Ross	LW	Canada	Portland Winterhawks (WHL)
3	62	Greg McKegg	C	Canada	Erie Otters (OHL)
3	79 (from Los Angeles)	Sondre Olden	LW/RW	Norway	Modo Hockey Jr. (J20 SuperElit)
4	116 (from Washington)	Petter Granberg	D	Sweden	Skelleftea AIK Jr. (J20 SuperElit)
5	144 (from New Jersey)	Sam Carrick	C	Canada	Brampton Battalion (OHL)
5	146 (from Washington)	Daniel Brodin	LW	Sweden	Djurgardens IF (Elitserien)
7	182	Josh Nicholls	RW	Canada	Saskatoon Blades (WHL)

== Farm teams ==
- The Maple Leafs continue their affiliation with the Toronto Marlies of the American Hockey League and the Reading Royals of the ECHL.

== See also ==
- 2010–11 NHL season
