= 2010–11 Carolina Hurricanes season =

National Hockey League team season

2010–11 Carolina Hurricanes
- Division: 3rd Southeast
- Conference: 9th Eastern
- 2010–11 record: 40–31–11
- Home record: 22–14–5
- Road record: 18–17–6
- Goals for: 236
- Goals against: 239

Team information
- General manager: Jim Rutherford
- Coach: Paul Maurice
- Captain: Eric Staal
- Alternate captains: Tim Gleason; Brandon Sutter
- Arena: RBC Center

Team leaders
- Goals: Eric Staal (33)
- Assists: Eric Staal (43)
- Points: Eric Staal (76)
- Penalty minutes: Tim Gleason (85)
- Plus/minus: Brandon Sutter (+13)
- Wins: Cam Ward (37)
- Goals against average: Ward (2.56)

The 2010–11 Carolina Hurricanes season was the 32nd season for the National Hockey League (NHL) franchise that was established on June 22, 1979, and 13th season since the franchise relocated to North Carolina to start the 1997–98 NHL season.

The Hurricanes posted a regular season record of 40 wins, 31 losses and 11 overtime/shootout losses for 91 points, failing to qualify for the Stanley Cup playoffs for the second consecutive season.

== Off-Season ==
On June 17, the Carolina Hurricanes announced that they will play seven games during the pre-season – six against NHL teams and one against SKA St. Petersburg of the Kontinental Hockey League (KHL).

For their first-round selection, the Hurricanes selected Jeff Skinner at the 2010 NHL entry draft. The Hurricanes had eight selections in total at the Draft.

== Regular season ==
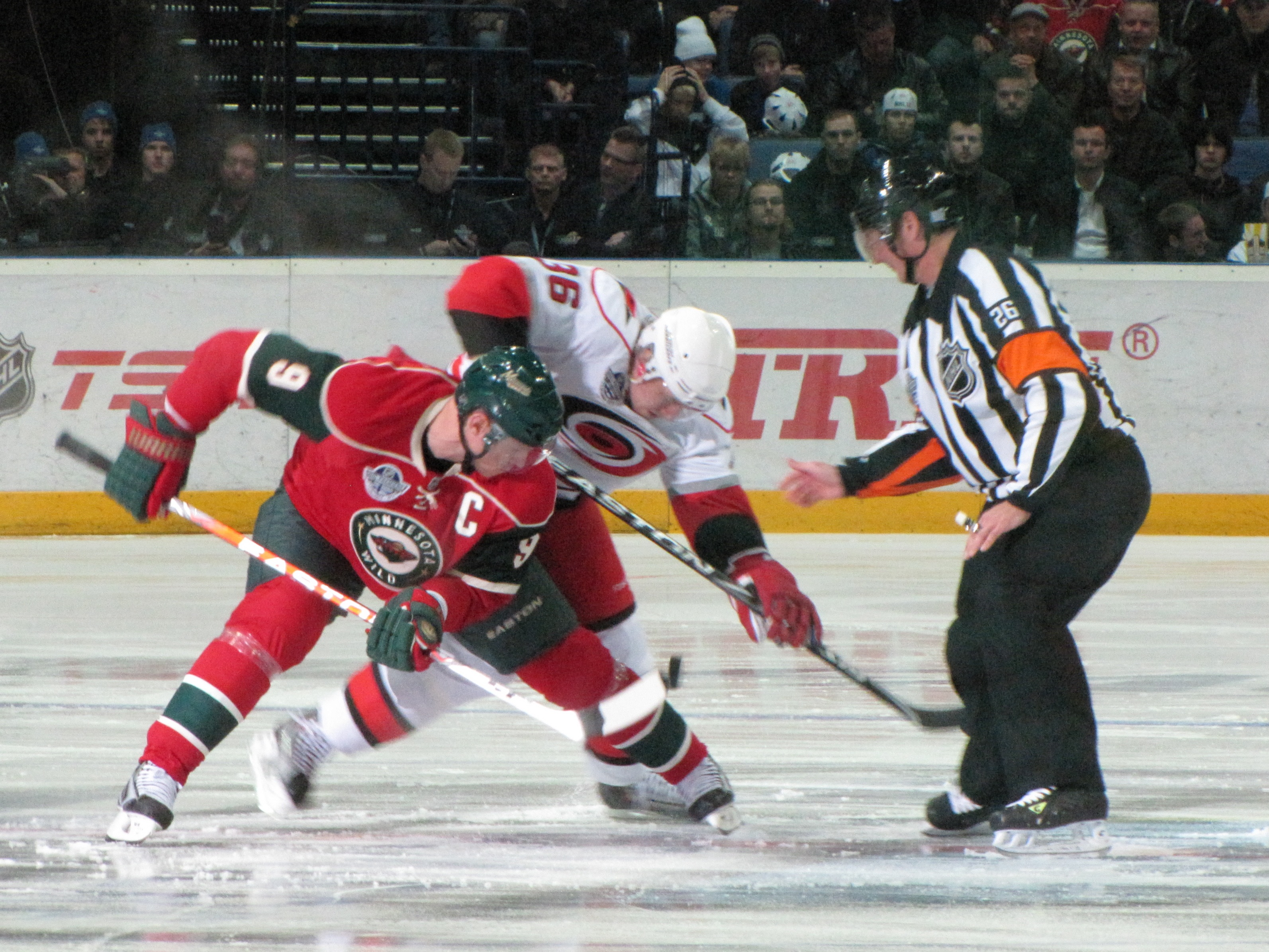
The first face off of the season, Hurricanes at Wild in Helsinki, Finland.

The Carolina Hurricanes started their 2010–11 season (as well as the 2010–11 NHL season) with a two-game series in Helsinki, Finland, against the Minnesota Wild. The Hurricanes swept the Wild in the two-game series, with 18-year-old rookie Jeff Skinner scoring the sole shootout goal to win the second game for the Hurricanes.

After Helsinki, the Hurricanes embarked on a five-game, nine-day road trip starting in Ottawa and ending in Phoenix on October 23. The Hurricanes arrived in Raleigh with a 4–3–0 record before their home opener against the Washington Capitals.

Before the October 30 game against the Pittsburgh Penguins, General Manager Jim Rutherford announced that Jeff Skinner would stay with Carolina Hurricanes for the remainder of 2010–11 season.

On November 17, Rutherford announced that defenseman Anton Babchuk and right wing Tom Kostopoulos would be traded to the Calgary Flames for defenseman Ian White and center Brett Sutter in an effort to "stabilize" the Canes' defense following two lopsided losses to the Montreal Canadiens and the Philadelphia Flyers.

The Hurricanes claimed right wing Troy Bodie on waivers and traded for center Ryan Carter – both from the Anaheim Ducks – on November 16 and 23, respectively. Bodie and Carter, along with Jiri Tlusty, are expected to bring more physicality to the Hurricanes' fourth line.

The Hurricanes concluded the regular season with the most power-play opportunities in the NHL, with 346.

== Standings ==
=== Divisional standings ===
Southeast Division
		GP	W	L	OTL	ROW	GF	GA	Pts
**1**	**z-Washington Capitals**	**82**	**48**	**23**	**11**	**43**	**224**	**197**	**107**
**2**	**Tampa Bay Lightning**	**82**	**46**	**25**	**11**	**40**	**247**	**240**	**103**
3	Carolina Hurricanes	82	40	31	11	35	236	239	91
4	Atlanta Thrashers	82	34	36	12	29	223	269	80
5	Florida Panthers	82	30	40	12	26	195	229	72

=== Conference standings ===
Eastern Conference
R		Div	GP	W	L	OTL	ROW	GF	GA	Pts
**1**	**z – Washington Capitals**	**SE**	**82**	**48**	**23**	**11**	**43**	**224**	**197**	107
**2**	**y – Philadelphia Flyers**	**AT**	**82**	**47**	**23**	**12**	**44**	**259**	**223**	106
**3**	**y – Boston Bruins**	**NE**	**82**	**46**	**25**	**11**	**44**	**246**	**195**	103
**4**	**Pittsburgh Penguins**	**AT**	**82**	**49**	**25**	**8**	**39**	**238**	**199**	106
**5**	**Tampa Bay Lightning**	**SE**	**82**	**46**	**25**	**11**	**40**	**247**	**240**	103
**6**	**Montreal Canadiens**	**NE**	**82**	**44**	**30**	**8**	**41**	**216**	**209**	96
**7**	**Buffalo Sabres**	**NE**	**82**	**43**	**29**	**10**	**38**	**245**	**229**	96
**8**	**New York Rangers**	**AT**	**82**	**44**	**33**	**5**	**35**	**233**	**198**	93
8.5
9	Carolina Hurricanes	SE	82	40	31	11	35	236	239	91
10	Toronto Maple Leafs	NE	82	37	34	11	32	218	251	85
11	New Jersey Devils	AT	82	38	39	5	35	174	209	81
12	Atlanta Thrashers	SE	82	34	36	12	29	223	269	80
13	Ottawa Senators	NE	82	32	40	10	30	192	250	74
14	New York Islanders	AT	82	30	39	13	26	229	264	73
15	Florida Panthers	SE	82	30	40	12	26	195	229	72

bold – qualified for playoffs; y – Won division; z – Placed first in conference (and division)
AT – Atlantic Division, NE – Northeast Division, SE – Southeast Division

== Schedule and results ==
=== Pre-season ===
Win Loss Overtime/shootout loss

2010 Pre-season game log: 3–3–0 (Home: 1–2–0; Road: 1–2–0)
#	Date	Visitor	Score	Home	OT	Decision	Record	Recap
1	September 21	Florida Panthers	4 - 1	Carolina Hurricanes		Ward	0-1-0	Recap
2	September 23	Carolina Hurricanes	3 - 1	Nashville Predators		Peters	1-1-0	Recap
3	September 24	Nashville Predators	2 - 1	Carolina Hurricanes		Pogge	1-2-0	Recap
4	September 25	Carolina Hurricanes	1 - 0	Atlanta Thrashers		Ward	2-2-0	Recap
5	September 29	Carolina Hurricanes	Canceled	Florida Panthers
6	October 1	Atlanta Thrashers	1 - 2	Carolina Hurricanes	OT	Ward	3-2-0	Recap
7	October 4	Carolina Hurricanes	3 - 5	SKA St. Petersburg		Peters	3-3-0	Recap

=== Regular season ===
Win (2 points) Loss (0 points) Overtime/shootout loss (1 point)

2010–11 Game Log

October: 5–5–0 (Home: 1-2-0; Road: 4–3–0)
#	Date	Visitor	Score	Home	OT	Decision	Attendance	Record	Pts	Recap
1	October 7 (in Helsinki, Finland)	Carolina Hurricanes	4-3	Minnesota Wild		Ward	12,355	1-0-0	2
2	October 8 (in Helsinki, Finland)	Minnesota Wild	1-2	Carolina Hurricanes	SO	Ward	13,465	2-0-0	4
3	October 14	Carolina Hurricanes	2-3	Ottawa Senators		Ward	16,270	1-2-0	4
4	October 17	Carolina Hurricanes	1-5	Vancouver Canucks		Ward	18,860	2-2-0	4
5	October 19	Carolina Hurricanes	5-2	San Jose Sharks		Ward	17,562	3-2-0	6
6	October 20	Carolina Hurricanes	3-4	Los Angeles Kings		Peters	14,053	3-3-0	6
7	October 23	Carolina Hurricanes	4-3	Phoenix Coyotes	OT	Ward	8,189	4-3-0	8
8	October 27	Washington Capitals	3-0	Carolina Hurricanes		Ward	18,680	4-4-0	8
9	October 29	Carolina Hurricanes	4-3	New York Rangers		Ward	17,819	5-4-0	10
10	October 30	Pittsburgh Penguins	3-0	Carolina Hurricanes		Ward	18,680	5-5-0	10

November: 5-6-3 (Home: 4-3-1; Road:1-3-2)
#	Date	Visitor	Score	Home	OT	Decision	Attendance	Record	Pts	Recap
11	November 1	Carolina Hurricanes	2-3	Philadelphia Flyers		Peters	19,083	5-6-0	10
12	November 3	New York Islanders	2-7	Carolina Hurricanes		Ward	13,043	6-6-0	12
13	November 5	Carolina Hurricanes	4-7	Florida Panthers		Ward	14,761	6-7-0	12
14	November 6	Florida Panthers	2-3	Carolina Hurricanes		Ward	17,704	7-7-0	14
15	November 9	Edmonton Oilers	1-7	Carolina Hurricanes		Ward	11,890	8-7-0	16
16	November 11	Philadelphia Flyers	8-1	Carolina Hurricanes		Ward	14,719	8-8-0	16
17	November 13	Carolina Hurricanes	2-7	Montreal Canadiens		Ward	21,273	8-9-0	16
18	November 17	Ottawa Senators	1-7	Carolina Hurricanes		Ward	12,938	9-9-0	18
19	November 19	Carolina Hurricanes	4-5	Pittsburgh Penguins	SO	Peters	18,264	9-9-1	19
20	November 20	Nashville Predators	2-1	Carolina Hurricanes	SO	Ward	15,384	9-9-2	20
21	November 24	Washington Capitals	3-2	Carolina Hurricanes		Peters	15,200	9-10-2	20
22	November 26	Carolina Hurricanes	3-0	Boston Bruins		Ward	17,565	10-10-2	22
23	November 28	Carolina Hurricanes	2-3	Washington Capitals	SO	Ward	18,398	10-10-3	23
24	November 29	Dallas Stars	4-1	Carolina Hurricanes		Ward	15,382	10-11-3	23

December: 5-4-1 (Home: 2-2-0; Road: 3-2-1)
#	Date	Visitor	Score	Home	OT	Decision	Attendance	Record	Pts	Recap
25	December 3	Colorado Avalanche	1-2	Carolina Hurricanes	OT	Ward	16,277	11-11-3	25
26	December 4	Carolina Hurricanes	2-5	Nashville Predators		Ward	15,016	11-12-3	25
27	December 10	Carolina Hurricanes	1-2	Dallas Stars	SO	Ward	13,012	11-12-4	26
28	December 11	Carolina Hurricanes	2-1	St. Louis Blues	SO	Ward	19,150	12-12-4	28
29	December 15	Carolina Hurricanes	4-3	Florida Panthers		Peters	14,651	13-12-4	30
30	December 16	Carolina Hurricanes	3-2	Atlanta Thrashers	SO	Ward	11,043	14-12-4	32
31	December 18	Anaheim Ducks	2-4	Carolina Hurricanes		Ward	16,603	15-12-4	34
32	December 20	Carolina Hurricanes	1-5	Tampa Bay Lightning		Peters	17,210	15-13-4	34
33	December 23	Montreal Canadiens	3-2	Carolina Hurricanes		Ward	16,981	15-14-4	34
34	December 26	Washington Capitals	3-2	Carolina Hurricanes		Ward	10,477	15-15-4	34
35	December 28	Carolina Hurricanes	4-3	Toronto Maple Leafs		Ward	19,309	16-15-4	36
36	December 29	Carolina Hurricanes	4-0	Ottawa Senators		Ward	20,221	17-15-4	38

January: 8-4-2 (Home: 6-1-1; Road: 2-3-1)
#	Date	Visitor	Score	Home	OT	Decision	Attendance	Record	Pts	Recap
37	January 1	New Jersey Devils	3-6	Carolina Hurricanes		Ward	16,107	18-15-4	40
38	January 3	Florida Panthers	4-3	Carolina Hurricanes	OT	Ward	16,337	18-15-5	41
39	January 5	Carolina Hurricanes	1-2	New York Rangers	OT	Ward	18,200	18-15-6	42
40	January 7	Carolina Hurricanes	5-3	Florida Panthers		Peters	14,262	19-15-6	44
41	January 9	Atlanta Thrashers	3-4	Carolina Hurricanes	OT	Peters	17,907	20-15-6	46
42	January 11	Calgary Flames	5-6	Carolina Hurricanes	SO	Ward	10,096	21-15-6	48
43	January 13	Carolina Hurricanes	2-3	Buffalo Sabres		Ward	18,276	21-16-6	48
44	January 15	Tampa Bay Lightning	4-6	Carolina Hurricanes		Ward	18,680	22-16-6	50
45	January 17	Carolina Hurricanes	0-7	Boston Bruins		Ward	17,565	22-17-6	50
46	January 18	Boston Bruins	3-2	Carolina Hurricanes		Ward	17,419	22-18-6	50
47	January 20	New York Rangers	1-4	Carolina Hurricanes		Ward	15,861	23-18-6	52
48	January 22	Carolina Hurricanes	2-3	Pittsburgh Penguins		Ward	18,305	23-19-6	52
49	January 24	Toronto Maple Leafs	4-6	Carolina Hurricanes		Ward	16,201	24-19-6	54
50	January 26	Carolina Hurricanes	4-2	New York Islanders		Ward	4,976	25-19-6	56

February: 4-6-3 (Home: 3-2-1; Road: 1-4-2)
#	Date	Visitor	Score	Home	OT	Decision	Attendance	Record	Pts	Recap
51	February 1	Boston Bruins	2-3	Carolina Hurricanes		Ward	18,126	25-20-6	56
52	February 3	Carolina Hurricanes	0-3	Toronto Maple Leafs		Ward	19,220	25-21-6	56
53	February 5	Atlanta Thrashers	3-4	Carolina Hurricanes	OT	Ward	16,874	26-21-6	58
54	February 8	Carolina Hurricanes	2-3	New Jersey Devils	OT	Ward	12,126	26-21-7	59
55	February 10	Carolina Hurricanes	1-2	Philadelphia Flyers		Ward	19,726	26-22-7	59
56	February 12	Carolina Hurricanes	3-4	Tampa Bay Lightning	OT	Ward	19,910	26-22-8	60
57	February 13	Carolina Hurricanes	3-2	Atlanta Thrashers		Ward	13,032	27-22-8	62
58	February 16	Carolina Hurricanes	2-3	New Jersey Devils		Ward	14,445	27-23-8	62
59	February 18	Philadelphia Flyers	3-2	Carolina Hurricanes		Ward	18,726	28-23-8	64
60	February 19	New Jersey Devils	1-4	Carolina Hurricanes		Ward	17,890	28-24-8	64
61	February 22	New York Rangers	3-4	Carolina Hurricanes	SO	Ward	17,932	28-24-9	65
62	February 25	Pittsburgh Penguins	4-1	Carolina Hurricanes		Ward	18,719	29-24-9	67
63	February 26	Carolina Hurricanes	3-4	Montreal Canadiens		Ward	21,273	29-25-9	67

March: 8-5-1 (Home: 5-3-1; Road: 3-2-0)
#	Date	Visitor	Score	Home	OT	Decision	Attendance	Record	Pts	Recap
64	March 1	Florida Panthers	2-1	Carolina Hurricanes		Ward	16,252	30-25-9	69
65	March 3	Buffalo Sabres	3-2	Carolina Hurricanes	OT	Ward	15,213	31-25-9	71
66	March 4	Carolina Hurricanes	2-5	Chicago Blackhawks		Peters	21,830	31-26-9	71
67	March 9	Atlanta Thrashers	2-3	Carolina Hurricanes	OT	Ward	16,126	31-26-10	72
68	March 11	Carolina Hurricanes	1-2	Washington Capitals		Ward	18,398	31-27-10	72
69	March 12	Columbus Blue Jackets	2-3	Carolina Hurricanes		Ward	18,680	31-28-10	72
70	March 15	Carolina Hurricanes	1-0	Buffalo Sabres		Ward	18,690	32-28-10	74
71	March 16	Toronto Maple Leafs	1-3	Carolina Hurricanes		Ward	15,220	32-29-10	74
72	March 18	New York Islanders	3-2	Carolina Hurricanes	OT	Ward	17,686	33-29-10	76
73	March 22	Ottawa Senators	4-3	Carolina Hurricanes		Ward	16,189	34-29-10	78
74	March 25	Carolina Hurricanes	4-3	Tampa Bay Lightning		Ward	16,656	35-29-10	80
75	March 26	Tampa Bay Lightning	2-4	Carolina Hurricanes		Ward	17,264	35-30-10	80
76	March 29	Carolina Hurricanes	3-2	Washington Capitals	SO	Ward	18,398	36-30-10	82
77	March 30	Montreal Canadiens	6-2	Carolina Hurricanes		Ward	18,701	37-30-10	84

April: 3-1-1 (Home: 1-1-1; Road: 2-0-0)
#	Date	Visitor	Score	Home	OT	Decision	Attendance	Record	Pts	Recap
78	April 2	Carolina Hurricanes	4-2	New York Islanders		Ward	16,250	38-30-10	86
79	April 3	Buffalo Sabres	1-2	Carolina Hurricanes	OT	Ward	18,740	38-30-11	87
80	April 6	Detroit Red Wings	3-0	Carolina Hurricanes		Ward	17,602	39-30-11	89
81	April 8	Carolina Hurricanes	6-1	Atlanta Thrashers		Ward	14,652	40-30-11	91
82	April 9	Tampa Bay Lightning	2-6	Carolina Hurricanes		Ward	17,805	40-31-11	91

== Playoffs ==
The Hurricanes missed the playoffs for the second straight year by two points.

== Player statistics ==
=== Skaters ===
Note: Pos = Position; GP = Games played; G = Goals; A = Assists; Pts = Points; PIM = Penalty minutes; +/- = Plus/minus; PPG = Power-play goals; SHG = Short-handed goals; GWG = Game-winning goals

Regular season

Player	GP	G	A	Pts	+/−	PIM
Eric Staal	81	33	43	76	-10	72
Jeff Skinner	82	31	32	63	3	46
Tuomo Ruutu	82	19	38	57	1	54
Erik Cole	82	26	26	52	-1	49
Jussi Jokinen	70	19	33	52	3	24
Joe Corvo	82	11	29	40	-14	18
Joni Pitkanen	72	5	30	35	-2	60
Chad LaRose	82	16	15	31	-21	59
Jamie McBain	76	7	23	30	-8	32
Brandon Sutter	82	14	15	29	13	25
Sergei Samsonov^{‡}	58	10	16	26	0	12
Patrick Dwyer	80	8	10	18	-6	12
Tim Gleason	82	2	14	16	-11	85
Cory Stillman^{†}	21	5	11	16	2	4
Jiri Tlusty	57	6	6	12	1	14
Jay Harrison	72	3	7	10	5	72
Ian White^{†‡}	39	0	10	10	4	12
Anton Babchuk^{‡}	17	3	5	8	-4	12
Zach Boychuk	23	4	3	7	-2	4
Bryan Allen^{†}	19	0	5	5	4	19
Derek Joslin^{†}	17	1	4	5	7	2
Zac Dalpe	15	3	1	4	0	0
Tom Kostopoulos^{‡}	17	1	3	4	-1	30
Troy Bodie^{†}	50	1	2	3	-4	54
Ryan Carter^{†‡}	32	0	3	3	0	22
Jerome Samson	23	0	2	2	0	0
Jon Matsumoto	13	2	0	2	-4	4
Drayson Bowman	23	0	1	1	0	12
Patrick O'Sullivan^{‡}	10	1	0	1	-1	2
Bryan Rodney	3	0	0	0	0	2
Brett Carson^{‡}	13	0	0	0	7	4
Brett Sutter^{†}	1	0	0	0	0	0

^{†}Denotes player spent time with another team before joining Hurricanes. Stats reflect time with Hurricanes only.
^{‡}Traded mid-season
Bold/italics denotes franchise record

=== Goaltenders ===
Note: GP = Games played; Min = Minutes played; W = Wins; L = Losses; OT = Overtime losses; GA = Goals against; GAA= Goals against average; SA= Shots against; SV= Saves; Sv% = Save percentage; SO= Shutouts

Regular season

Player	GP	TOI	W	L	OT	GA	GAA	SA	Sv%	SO	G	A	PIM
Cam Ward	74	4318	37	26	10	184	2.56	2375	.923	4	0	1	0
Justin Peters	12	648	3	5	1	43	3.98	343	.875	0	0	0	4

^{†}Denotes player spent time with another team before joining Hurricanes. Stats reflect time with Hurricanes only.
^{‡}Traded mid-season
Bold/italics denotes franchise record

== Awards and records ==
=== Awards ===
Regular Season
Player	Award	Awarded
Eric Staal	NHL Third Star of the Week	December 20, 2010
Jussi Jokinen	NHL First Star of the Week	January 17, 2011
Eric Staal	NHL First Star of the Week	January 31, 2011
Jeff Skinner	NHL Rookie of the Month	January 2011
Jeff Skinner	Calder Memorial Trophy	June 2011

=== Milestones ===
Regular Season
Player	Milestone	Reached
Zac Dalpe	1st Career NHL Game; 1st Career NHL Assist; 1st Career NHL Point	October 7, 2010
Jeff Skinner	1st Career NHL Game	October 7, 2010
Jeff Skinner	1st Career NHL Assist; 1st Career NHL Point	October 8, 2010
Jeff Skinner	1st Career NHL Goal	October 20, 2010
Tim Gleason	400th Career NHL Game	October 23, 2010
Jon Matsumoto	1st Career NHL Game	November 1, 2010
Jon Matsumoto	1st Career NHL Goal; 1st Career NHL Point	November 3, 2010
Jussi Jokinen	400th Career NHL Game	November 5, 2010
Joe Corvo	500th Career NHL Game	November 6, 2010
Jiri Tlusty	100th Career NHL Game	November 11, 2010
Eric Staal	200th Career NHL Goal; 11th Career Hat Trick	November 17, 2010
Eric Staal	500th Career NHL Game	November 24, 2010
Tuomo Ruutu	400th Career NHL Game	November 26, 2010
Patrick Dwyer	100th Career NHL Game	December 15, 2010
Cam Ward	300th Career NHL Game	December 23, 2010
Tuomo Ruutu	100th Career NHL Goal	December 26, 2010
Zac Dalpe	1st Career NHL Goal	January 1, 2011
Jay Harrison	100th Career NHL Game	January 15, 2011
Erik Cole	200th Career NHL Assist	February 22, 2011
Erik Cole	600th Career NHL Game	February 25, 2011
Troy Bodie	100th Career NHL Game	February 25, 2011
Joni Pitkanen	200th Career NHL Assist	February 25, 2011
Jussi Jokinen	100th Career NHL Goal	February 26, 2011
Bryan Allen	100th Career NHL Point	March 9, 2011
Chad LaRose	400th Career NHL Game	March 29, 2011
Drayson Bowman	1st Career NHL Assist	March 30, 2011
Tim Gleason	100th Career NHL Point	April 2, 2011
Brandon Sutter	200th Career NHL Game	April 2, 2011
Eric Staal	500th Career NHL Point	April 3, 2011

== Transactions ==
The Hurricanes have been involved in the following transactions during the 2010–11 season.

=== Trades ===
Date	Details
May 13, 2010	To Phoenix Coyotes 5th-round pick in 2010 – Luke Walker	To Carolina Hurricanes Jared Staal
June 26, 2010	To New York Rangers 6th-round pick in 2010 – Jesper Fast; 2nd-round pick in 2011 (Note: Pick later traded to Calgary Flames.) – Tyler Wotherspoon	To Carolina Hurricanes Bobby Sanguinetti
June 26, 2010	To Philadelphia Flyers 7th-round pick in 2010 – Ricard Blidstrand	To Carolina Hurricanes Jon Matsumoto
June 26, 2010	To Edmonton Oilers 2nd-round pick in 2010 – Martin Marincin	To Carolina Hurricanes Riley Nash
November 17, 2010	To Calgary Flames Anton Babchuk; Tom Kostopoulos	To Carolina Hurricanes Ian White; Brett Sutter
November 23, 2010	To Anaheim Ducks Stefan Chaput; Matt Kennedy	To Carolina Hurricanes Ryan Carter
February 18, 2011	To San Jose Sharks Future considerations	To Carolina Hurricanes Derek Joslin
February 18, 2011	To San Jose Sharks Ian White	To Carolina Hurricanes 2nd-round pick in 2012 – Brock McGinn
February 24, 2011	To Florida Panthers Ryan Carter; 5th-round pick in 2011 (Note: Pick later traded to Atlanta Thrashers, then to San Jose Sharks.) – Sean Kuraly	To Carolina Hurricanes Cory Stillman
February 28, 2011	To Florida Panthers Sergei Samsonov	To Carolina Hurricanes Bryan Allen

=== Free agents acquired ===
Player	Former team	Contract terms
Anton Babchuk	Avangard Omsk	1 year, $1.4 million
Joe Corvo	Washington Capitals	2 years, $4.5 million
Patrick O'Sullivan	Phoenix Coyotes	1 year, $600,000

=== Free agents lost ===
Player	New team	Contract terms
Ray Whitney	Phoenix Coyotes	2 years, $6 million
Tim Conboy	Buffalo Sabres	1 year, $550,000
Brian Pothier	Genève-Servette HC	2 years
Alexandre Picard	Montreal Canadiens	1 year, $600,000
Mike Angelidis	Tampa Bay Lightning	1 year, $500,000
Michael Ryan	Philadelphia Flyers	1 year, $500,000

=== Claimed via waivers ===
Player	Former team	Date claimed off waivers
Troy Bodie	Anaheim Ducks	November 16, 2010

=== Lost via waivers ===
Player	New team	Date claimed off waivers
Patrick O'Sullivan	Minnesota Wild	November 23, 2010
Brett Carson	Calgary Flames	February 28, 2011

=== Lost via retirement ===
Player
Rod Brind'Amour

=== Player signings ===
Player	Contract terms
Jared Staal	3 years, $1.55 million entry-level contract
Matt Kennedy	3 years, $1.55 million entry-level contract
Jiri Tlusty	1 year, $500,000
Jay Harrison	1 year, $500,000
Jerome Samson	2 years, $1.025 million
Zack Fitzgerald	1 year, $500,000
Jon Matsumoto	2 years, $1.025 million
Justin Peters	2 years, $1.05 million
Nicolas Blanchard	2 years, $1.025 million
Casey Borer	1 year, $500,000
Nick Dodge	1 year, $500,000
Justin Pogge	1 year, $500,000
Bryan Rodney	1 year, $525,000
Riley Nash	3 years, $1.85 million entry-level contract
Brett Carson	1 year, $500,000
Jeff Skinner	3 years, $2.43 million entry-level contract
Rasmus Rissanen	3 years, $1.725 million entry-level contract
Justin Krueger	1 year, $525,000 entry-level contract
Justin Faulk	3 years, $2.53 million entry-level contract

== Draft picks ==
The 2010 NHL entry draft was held in Los Angeles • California.

Round	#	Player	Position	Nationality	College/Junior/Club team (League)
1	7	Jeff Skinner	C	Canada	Kitchener Rangers (OHL)
2	37	Justin Faulk	D	United States	U.S. National Team Development Program (USHL)
2	53 (from Buffalo via San Jose)	Mark Alt	D	United States	Cretin-Derham Hall (USHS-MN)
3	67	Danny Biega	D	Canada	Harvard University (ECAC Hockey)
3	85 (from Vancouver)	Austin Levi	D	United States	Plymouth Whalers (OHL)
4	105 (from Boston via Anaheim)	Justin Shugg	LW	Canada	Windsor Spitfires (OHL)
6	167 (from Colorado)	Tyler Stahl	D	Canada	Chilliwack Bruins (WHL)
7	187	Frederik Andersen	G	Denmark	Frederikshavn White Hawks (AL-Bank Ligaen)

== Farm teams ==
=== American Hockey League ===
The Charlotte Checkers were the Hurricanes' American Hockey League affiliate for the 2010–11 AHL season. The Checkers' ECHL franchise was folded and the Albany River Rats relocated to Charlotte as a replacement. The strategic partnership was designed to reduce travel costs and increase support for the organization across the state.

=== ECHL ===
The Florida Everblades are the Hurricanes ECHL affiliate.
