= 2010–11 New Jersey Devils season =

National Hockey League season

2010–11 New Jersey Devils
- Division: 4th Atlantic
- Conference: 11th Eastern
- 2010–11 record: 38–39–5
- Home record: 22–16–3
- Road record: 16–23–2
- Goals for: 174
- Goals against: 209

Team information
- General manager: Lou Lamoriello
- Coach: John MacLean (Oct.–Dec.); Jacques Lemaire (interim, Dec.–Apr.)
- Captain: Jamie Langenbrunner (Oct.–Jan.); Vacant (Jan.–Apr.)
- Alternate captains: Patrik Elias; Ilya Kovalchuk; Zach Parise
- Arena: Prudential Center
- Average attendance: 14,776

Team leaders
- Goals: Ilya Kovalchuk (31)
- Assists: Patrik Elias (41)
- Points: Patrik Elias (62)
- Penalty minutes: David Clarkson (116)
- Plus/minus: Mark Fayne (+10)
- Wins: Martin Brodeur (23)
- Goals against average: Johan Hedberg (2.38)

The 2010–11 New Jersey Devils season was the 37th season for the National Hockey League (NHL) franchise that was established on June 11, 1974, and 29th season since the franchise relocated from Colorado prior to the 1982–83 NHL season.

The Devils posted a regular season record of 38 wins, 39 losses and 5 overtime/shootout losses for 81 points, failing to qualify for the Stanley Cup playoffs for the first time since the 1995–96 season, ending their 13-season playoff streak. This was the first time the Devils finished the season with a losing record since the 1990–91 season. Their 174 goals scored were the lowest ever amount for the Devils in a non-lockout shortened season.

== Off-season ==
On April 26, 2010, Jacques Lemaire announced that he would retire from coaching. On June 17, the New Jersey Devils announced that John MacLean would become the 19th head coach in the franchise's history. On June 29, the Devils announced that former NHL player Adam Oates will be the assistant coach for the team for the 2010–11 season.

On July 19, Ilya Kovalchuk re-signed with the Devils to a 17-year, $102 million contract. The contract was front-loaded with minimal payments in the last few seasons, when Kovalchuk would be in his 40s and unlikely to play. The deal was subsequently rejected by the NHL as a circumvention of the NHL collective bargaining agreement. The Devils stated after the NHL rejection that they would appeal the decision under the "collective bargaining agreement" process. On August 8, arbitrator Richard Bloch upheld the NHL's rejection of the contract, rendering Kovalchuk an unrestricted free agent again. On September 4, the Devils re-submitted another contract to the NHL worth $100 million to be paid over 15 years. The deal was approved by the NHL the following week as part of an NHL–National Hockey League Players' Association agreement concerning contracts over five years in length.

== Regular season ==
An injury to Bryce Salvador allowed the Devils to avoid a major trade before the start of the regular season. They opened their regular season at home on October 8 with a 4–3 overtime loss to the Dallas Stars with only 20 players on the roster. Subsequent injuries to Anton Volchenkov and Brian Rolston, as well as a one-game suspension of Pierre-Luc Letourneau-Leblond after a 7–2 loss to the Washington Capitals, dropped the roster size to 17. The team and management have been under scrutiny for the decision to dress as few as 15 men (and two goaltenders) as a result of having too few funds for an average-sized roster.

After an NHL-worst 9–22–2 start to the season, John MacLean was fired as head coach, and Jacques Lemaire, who had retired as the Devils' head coach in the off-season, was hired as interim head coach.

Following the trade of captain Jamie Langenbrunner, the Devils managed an astonishing turnaround. After the start of the second half of the season, the Devils saw a dramatic increase in offensive production, in addition to the outstanding performance by backup goaltender Johan Hedberg. The Devils turned their record around from 10 to 29–2 on January 9 to 32–32–4 by March 12, with a point percentage of over 80% during their 22–3–2 stretch. Following a win against New York Islanders on March 12, the Devils found themselves six points out of the final playoff berth with a game in hand on the eighth-placed New York Rangers, and a hope of making the playoffs for a 14th consecutive season had been renewed among the fans. The team faded, however, finishing 12 points behind the Rangers.

With the injured Zach Parise missing 69 of the Devils' 82 regular season games, the team struggled offensively, finishing 30th overall in goals scored with just 171 (excluding three shootout-winning goals). They also finished 30th overall in power-play goals scored, with 34, and power-play opportunities, with 237. However, the Devils were the most disciplined team in the league once again, with only 241 power-play opportunities against, and they tied the Los Angeles Kings for the fewest power-play goals allowed with 40.

At the conclusion of the season, head coach Jacques Lemaire announced that he would not return to coach the Devils in the 2011–12 season.

== Playoffs ==
Following a 3–1 loss to the Montreal Canadiens on April 2, the Devils were eliminated from playoff contention for the first time since 1996.

== Media ==
This season was Mike Emrick's final season as the television play-by-play announcer for the New Jersey Devils since he moved to NBC Sports. Steve Cangialosi would replace Emrick the following year. However, Chico Resch continued to be a TV color commentator. Radio coverage was still on WFAN with Matt Loughlin and Sherry Ross.

== Standings ==
=== Divisional standings ===
Atlantic Division
		GP	W	L	OTL	ROW	GF	GA	Pts
**1**	**Philadelphia Flyers**	**82**	**47**	**23**	**12**	**44**	**259**	**223**	**106**
**2**	**Pittsburgh Penguins**	**82**	**49**	**25**	**8**	**39**	**238**	**199**	**106**
**3**	**New York Rangers**	**82**	**44**	**33**	**5**	**35**	**233**	**198**	**93**
4	New Jersey Devils	82	38	39	5	35	174	209	81
5	New York Islanders	82	30	39	13	26	229	264	73

=== Conference standings ===
Eastern Conference
R		Div	GP	W	L	OTL	ROW	GF	GA	Pts
**1**	**z – Washington Capitals**	**SE**	**82**	**48**	**23**	**11**	**43**	**224**	**197**	107
**2**	**y – Philadelphia Flyers**	**AT**	**82**	**47**	**23**	**12**	**44**	**259**	**223**	106
**3**	**y – Boston Bruins**	**NE**	**82**	**46**	**25**	**11**	**44**	**246**	**195**	103
**4**	**Pittsburgh Penguins**	**AT**	**82**	**49**	**25**	**8**	**39**	**238**	**199**	106
**5**	**Tampa Bay Lightning**	**SE**	**82**	**46**	**25**	**11**	**40**	**247**	**240**	103
**6**	**Montreal Canadiens**	**NE**	**82**	**44**	**30**	**8**	**41**	**216**	**209**	96
**7**	**Buffalo Sabres**	**NE**	**82**	**43**	**29**	**10**	**38**	**245**	**229**	96
**8**	**New York Rangers**	**AT**	**82**	**44**	**33**	**5**	**35**	**233**	**198**	93
8.5
9	Carolina Hurricanes	SE	82	40	31	11	35	236	239	91
10	Toronto Maple Leafs	NE	82	37	34	11	32	218	251	85
11	New Jersey Devils	AT	82	38	39	5	35	174	209	81
12	Atlanta Thrashers	SE	82	34	36	12	29	223	269	80
13	Ottawa Senators	NE	82	32	40	10	30	192	250	74
14	New York Islanders	AT	82	30	39	13	26	229	264	73
15	Florida Panthers	SE	82	30	40	12	26	195	229	72

bold – qualified for playoffs; y – Won division; z – Placed first in conference (and division)
AT – Atlantic Division, NE – Northeast Division, SE – Southeast Division

== Schedule and results ==
=== Pre-season ===
Preseason: 2-1-3 (home: 2-0-1; road: 0-1-2)

Game	Date	Opponent	Score	Location	Attendance	Record
1	September 21	Philadelphia Flyers	3-4 (SO)	Wells Fargo Center	19,288	0–0–1
2	September 23	New York Rangers	3-4 (OT)	Madison Square Garden	14,987	0–0–2
3	September 25	New York Rangers	4-5 (OT)	Prudential Center	13,821	0–0–3
4	September 28	Philadelphia Flyers	3-2	Prudential Center	10,124	1–0–3
5	October 1	New York Islanders	4-3	Prudential Center	13,596	2–0–3
6	October 2	New York Islanders	1-2	Nassau Veterans Memorial Coliseum	7,783	2–1–3

Win Loss Overtime/Shootout Loss

=== Regular season ===
2010-11 Game Log: 38-39-5, 81 Points (home: 22-16-3; road: 16-23-2)
October: 3-8-1, 7 Points (home: 0-4-1; road: 3-4-0)

Game	October	Opponent	Score	Location	Attendance	Record	Points
1	8	Dallas Stars	3-4 (OT)	Prudential Center	17,625	0–0–1	1
2	9	@ Washington Capitals	2-7	Verizon Center	18,398	0–1–1	1
3	11	Pittsburgh Penguins	1-3	Prudential Center	12,880	0–2–1	1
4	13	@ Buffalo Sabres	1-0 (OT)	HSBC Arena	18,690	1–2–1	3
5	15	Colorado Avalanche	2-3	Prudential Center	12,221	1–3–1	3
6	16	Boston Bruins	1-4	Prudential Center	13,056	1–4–1	3
7	21	@ Montreal Canadiens	3-0	Bell Centre	21,273	2–4–1	5
8	23	Buffalo Sabres	1-6	Prudential Center	14,228	2–5–1	5
9	24	@ New York Rangers	1-3	Madison Square Garden	18,200	2–6–1	5
10	27	@ San Jose Sharks	2-5	HP Pavilion	17,562	2–7–1	5
11	29	@ Anaheim Ducks	2-1	Honda Center	14,724	3–7–1	7
12	30	@ Los Angeles Kings	1-3	Staples Center	18,118	3–8–1	7

November: 5-6-1, 11 Points (home: 4-1-1; road: 1-5-0)

Game	November	Opponent	Score	Location	Attendance	Record	Points
13	1	@ Vancouver Canucks	0-3	Rogers Arena	18,860	3–9–1	7
14	3	@ Chicago Blackhawks	5-3	United Center	21,044	4–9–1	9
15	5	New York Rangers	0-3	Prudential Center	17,625	4–10–1	9
16	10	Buffalo Sabres	4-5 (SO)	Prudential Center	14,566	4–10–2	10
17	12	Edmonton Oilers	4-3 (OT)	Prudential Center	14,650	5–10–2	12
18	15	@ Boston Bruins	0-3	TD Garden	17,565	5–11–2	12
19	18	@ Toronto Maple Leafs	1-3	Air Canada Centre	19,271	5–12–2	12
20	20	@ St. Louis Blues	2-3	Scottrade Center	19,150	5–13–2	12
21	22	Washington Capitals	5-0	Prudential Center	14,107	6–13–2	14
22	24	Calgary Flames	2-1 (SO)	Prudential Center	13,202	7–13–2	16
23	26	@ New York Islanders	0-2	Nassau Veterans Memorial Coliseum	10,897	7–14–2	16
24	27	Philadelphia Flyers	2-1 (SO)	Prudential Center	17,625	8–14–2	18

December: 2-11-0, 4 Points (home: 2-6-0; road: 0-5-0)

Game	December	Opponent	Score	Location	Attendance	Record	Points
25	2	Montreal Canadiens	1-5	Prudential Center	11,434	8–15–2	18
26	4	@ Philadelphia Flyers	3-5	Wells Fargo Center	19,657	8–16–2	18
27	6	@ Pittsburgh Penguins	1-2	Consol Energy Center	18,185	8–17–2	18
28	10	@ Ottawa Senators	2-3	Scotiabank Place	16,471	8–18–2	18
29	11	Detroit Red Wings	1-4	Prudential Center	17,625	8–19–2	18
30	15	Phoenix Coyotes	3-0	Prudential Center	13,208	9–19–2	20
31	17	Nashville Predators	1-3	Prudential Center	14,137	9–20–2	20
32	18	@ Atlanta Thrashers	1-7	Philips Arena	17,024	9–21–2	20
33	21	@ Washington Capitals	1-5	Verizon Center	18,398	9–22–2	20
34	23	New York Islanders	1-5	Prudential Center	13,312	9–23–2	20
35	26	Toronto Maple Leafs	1-4	Prudential Center	5,329	9–24–2	20
36	29	New York Rangers	1-3	Prudential Center	17,625	9–25–2	20
37	31	Atlanta Thrashers	3-1	Prudential Center	13,492	10–25–2	22

January: 6-5-1, 13 Points (home: 3-2-0; road: 3-3-1)

Game	January	Opponent	Score	Location	Attendance	Record	Points
38	1	@ Carolina Hurricanes	3-6	RBC Center	16,107	10–26–2	22
39	4	Minnesota Wild	1-2	Prudential Center	13,257	10–27–2	22
40	6	Philadelphia Flyers	2-4	Prudential Center	15,098	10–28–2	22
41	8	@ Philadelphia Flyers	1-2	Wells Fargo Center	19,859	10–29–2	22
42	9	Tampa Bay Lightning	6-3	Prudential Center	16,194	11–29–2	24
43	14	@ Tampa Bay Lightning	5-2	St. Pete Times Forum	18,736	12–29–2	26
44	15	@ Florida Panthers	2-3 (OT)	BankAtlantic Center	17,825	12–29–3	27
45	17	@ New York Islanders	5-2	Nassau Veterans Memorial Coliseum	13,119	13–29–3	29
46	20	Pittsburgh Penguins	2-0	Prudential Center	14,890	14–29–3	31
47	22	@ Philadelphia Flyers	3-1	Wells Fargo Center	19,847	15–29–3	33
48	23	Florida Panthers	5-2	Prudential Center	15,109	16–29–3	35
49	26	@ Detroit Red Wings	1-3	Joe Louis Arena	20,066	16–30–3	35

February: 11-1-1, 23 Points (home: 5-0-1; road: 6-1-0)

Game	February	Opponent	Score	Location	Attendance	Record	Points
50	1	Ottawa Senators	2-1	Prudential Center	7,218	17–30–3	37
51	3	@ New York Rangers	3-2	Madison Square Garden	18,200	18–30–3	39
52	4	Florida Panthers	3-4 (OT)	Prudential Center	13,577	18–30–4	40
53	6	@ Montreal Canadiens	4-1	Bell Centre	21,273	19–30–4	42
54	8	Carolina Hurricanes	3-2 (OT)	Prudential Center	12,126	20–30–4	44
55	10	@ Toronto Maple Leafs	2-1 (OT)	Air Canada Centre	19,260	21–30–4	46
56	11	San Jose Sharks	2-1	Prudential Center	17,102	22–30–4	48
57	16	Carolina Hurricanes	3-2	Prudential Center	14,445	23–30–4	50
58	18	New York Rangers	1-0	Prudential Center	17,625	24–30–4	52
59	19	@ Carolina Hurricanes	4-1	RBC Center	17,890	25–30–4	54
60	22	@ Dallas Stars	1-0	American Airlines Center	13,652	26–30–4	56
61	25	@ Tampa Bay Lightning	1-2	St. Pete Times Forum	19,563	26–31–4	56
62	27	@ Florida Panthers	2-1	BankAtlantic Center	16,592	27–31–4	58

March: 8-5-1, 17 Points (home: 5-2-0; road: 3-3-1)

Game	March	Opponent	Score	Location	Attendance	Record	Points
63	2	Tampa Bay Lightning	2-1	Prudential Center	12,857	28–31–4	60
64	4	Pittsburgh Penguins	2-1 (OT)	Prudential Center	17,625	29–31–4	62
65	6	@ New York Islanders	3-2 (SO)	Nassau Veterans Memorial Coliseum	15,893	30–31–4	64
66	8	Ottawa Senators	1-2	Prudential Center	15,978	30–32–4	64
67	11	@ Atlanta Thrashers	3-2 (OT)	Philips Arena	16,073	31–32–4	66
68	12	New York Islanders	3-2 (OT)	Prudential Center	17,625	32–32–4	68
69	15	Atlanta Thrashers	4-2	Prudential Center	16,188	33–32–4	70
70	17	@ Ottawa Senators	1-3	Scotiabank Place	17,758	33–33–4	70
71	18	Washington Capitals	0-3	Prudential Center	17,625	33–34–4	70
72	20	@ Columbus Blue Jackets	3-0	Nationwide Arena	13,043	34–34–4	72
73	22	@ Boston Bruins	1-4	TD Garden	17,565	34–35–4	72
74	25	@ Pittsburgh Penguins	0-1 (SO)	Consol Energy Center	18,329	34–35–5	73
75	26	@ Buffalo Sabres	0-2	HSBC Arena	18,690	34–36–5	73
76	30	New York Islanders	3-2	Prudential Center	16,252	35–36–5	75

April: 3-3-0, 6 Points (home: 3-1-0; road: 0-2-0)

Game	April	Opponent	Score	Location	Attendance	Record	Points
77	1	Philadelphia Flyers	4-2	Prudential Center	17,625	36–36–5	77
78	2	Montreal Canadiens	1-3	Prudential Center	17,625	36–37–5	77
79	5	@ Pittsburgh Penguins	2-4	Consol Energy Center	18,331	36–38–5	77
80	6	Toronto Maple Leafs	4-2	Prudential Center	14,207	37–38–5	79
81	9	@ New York Rangers	2-5	Madison Square Garden	18,200	37–39–5	79
82	10	Boston Bruins	3-2	Prudential Center	17,625	38–39–5	81

2010-11 Schedule

Win (2 Points) Loss (0 Points) Overtime/Shootout Loss (1 Point)

== Player statistics ==
=== Skaters ===
Note: GP = Games played; G = Goals; A = Assists; Pts = Points; +/− = Plus/Minus; PIM = Penalty Minutes

Regular season

Player	GP	G	A	Pts	+/−	PIM
Patrik Elias	81	21	41	62	-4	16
Ilya Kovalchuk	81	31	29	60	-26	28
Travis Zajac	82	13	31	43	-6	24
Brian Rolston	65	14	20	34	-6	34
Dainius Zubrus	79	13	17	30	-11	53
Jason Arnott^{‡}	62	13	11	24	-9	32
Andy Greene	82	4	19	23	-23	22
Mattias Tedenby	58	8	14	22	3	14
David Clarkson	82	12	6	18	-20	116
Nick Palmieri	43	9	8	17	9	6
Henrik Tallinder	82	5	11	16	-6	40
Mark Fayne	57	4	10	14	10	27
Jamie Langenbrunner^{‡}	31	4	10	14	-15	16
Rod Pelley	74	3	7	10	-9	27
Jacob Josefson	28	3	7	10	5	6
Anton Volchenkov	56	0	8	8	3	34
Anssi Salmela	48	1	6	7	-11	14
Colin White	69	0	6	6	-2	48
Zach Parise	13	3	3	6	-1	6
Matthew Corrente	22	0	6	6	-5	44
Alexander Vasyunov	18	1	4	5	0	0
Matt Taormina	17	3	2	5	-2	2
Adam Mair	65	1	3	4	-16	45
Vladimir Zharkov	38	2	2	4	3	2
Tim Sestito	36	0	2	2	-5	9
Mark Fraser	26	0	2	2	2	29
Bradley Mills	4	1	0	1	1	5
Alexander Urbom	8	1	0	1	-2	0
Dave Steckel^{†}	18	1	0	1	-3	2
Jay Leach	7	0	0	0	0	7
Pierre-Luc Letourneau-Leblond	2	0	0	0	−2	21
Tyler Eckford	4	0	0	0	-1	0
Olivier Magnan	18	0	0	0	-4	4
Stephen Gionta	12	0	0	0	-3	6
Adam Henrique	1	0	1	0	1	0

=== Goaltenders ===
Regular season

Player	GP	Min	W	L	OT	GA	GAA	SA	Sv%	SO	G	A	PIM
Martin Brodeur	56	3116	23	26	3	127	2.45	1313	.903	6	0	2	2
Johan Hedberg	34	1717	15	12	2	68	2.38	777	.912	3	0	1	4
Mike McKenna	2	118	0	1	0	6	3.05	56	.893	0	0	0	0

^{†}Denotes player spent time with another team before joining Devils. Stats reflect time with Devils only.
^{‡}Traded mid-season. Stats reflect time with Devils only.

Note:

Pos = Position;GP = Games played; G = Goals; A = Assists; Pts = Points; PIM = Penalty minutes; +/- = Plus/minus; PPG = Power-play goals; SHG = Short-handed goals; GWG = Game-winning goals
Pos = Position;GP = Games played; Min, TOI = Minutes played; W = Wins; L = Losses; T,T/OT = Ties; OTL = Overtime losses; GA = Goals-against; GAA = Goals-against average; SO = Shutouts; SA = Shots against; SV = Shots saved;SV% = Save percentage;

== Awards and records ==
=== Awards ===
Regular Season
Player	Award	Awarded
Martin Brodeur	NHL Third Star of the Week	January 24, 2011
Johan Hedberg	NHL Second Star of the Week	February 21, 2011
Johan Hedberg	NHL Third Star of the Month	February 2011

=== Records ===
Player	Record (Amount)	Achieved

=== Milestones ===
Regular Season
Player	Milestone	Reached
Jason Arnott	1,100th Career NHL Game	October 8, 2010
Matt Taormina	1st Career NHL Game	October 8, 2010
Alexander Urbom	1st Career NHL Game	October 8, 2010
Matt Taormina	1st Career NHL Assist; 1st Career NHL Point	October 13, 2010
Matthew Corrente	1st Career NHL Assist; 1st Career NHL Point	October 15, 2010
Matt Taormina	1st Career NHL Goal	October 15, 2010
Jacob Josefson	1st Career NHL Game	October 15, 2010
Olivier Magnan	1st Career NHL Game	October 21, 2010
Alexander Vasyunov	1st Career NHL Game	October 23, 2010
Alexander Vasyunov	1st Career NHL Assist; 1st Career NHL Point	October 29, 2010
Bradley Mills	1st Career NHL Game	October 30, 2010
Bradley Mills	1st Career NHL Goal; 1st Career NHL Point	November 3, 2010
Stephen Gionta	1st Career NHL Game	November 5, 2010
Mattias Tedenby	1st Career NHL Game; 1st Career NHL Assist; 1st Career NHL Point	November 10, 2010
Mattias Tedenby	1st Career NHL Goal	November 12, 2010
Alexander Vasyunov	1st Career NHL Goal	November 12, 2010
Henrik Tallinder	500th Career NHL Game	November 18, 2010
Patrik Elias	900th Career NHL Game	November 20, 2010
Mark Fayne	1st Career NHL Game	November 22, 2010
Johan Hedberg	300th Career NHL Game	November 22, 2010
Colin White	100th Career NHL Assist	December 4, 2010
Colin White	700th Career NHL Game	December 6, 2010
Mark Fayne	1st Career NHL Goal; 1st Career NHL Point	December 15, 2010
Martin Brodeur	1,100th Career NHL Game	December 23, 2010
Mark Fayne	1st Career NHL Assist	December 26, 2010
Nick Palmieri	1st Career NHL Goal	January 9, 2011
Jason Arnott	500th Career NHL Assist	January 17, 2011
Vladimir Zharkov	1st Career NHL Goal	January 17, 2011
Dainius Zubrus	300th Career NHL Assist	February 3, 2011
Jacques Lemaire	600th Career NHL Win (coach)	February 10, 2011
Patrik Elias	800th Career NHL Point	February 19, 2011
Anton Volchenkov	100th Career NHL Point	February 19, 2011
Adam Mair	600th Career NHL Game	March 6, 2011
Jacob Josefson	1st Career NHL Assist; 1st Career NHL Point	March 6, 2011
Jacob Josefson	1st Career NHL Goal	March 12, 2011
Anssi Salmela	100th Career NHL Game	March 17, 2011
Dave Steckel	300th Career NHL Game	March 20, 2011
Travis Zajac	400th Career NHL Game	March 25, 2011
Rod Pelley	200th Career NHL Game	March 30, 2011
Brian Rolston	400th Career NHL Assist	April 1, 2011
Ilya Kovalchuk	700th Career NHL Game; 700th Career NHL Point	April 6, 2011
Adam Henrique	1st Career NHL Game	April 10, 2011
Alexander Urbom	1st Career NHL Goal; 1st Career NHL Point	April 10, 2011
David Clarkson	100th Career NHL Point	April 10, 2011

== Transactions ==
The Devils have been involved in the following transactions during the 2010–11 season.

=== Trades ===
Date	Details
June 19, 2010	To Nashville Predators Matthew Halischuk; 2nd-round pick in 2011	To New Jersey Devils Jason Arnott
January 7, 2011	To Dallas Stars Jamie Langenbrunner	To New Jersey Devils Conditional 3rd-round pick in 2011 (Note: Condition satisfied.)
February 9, 2011	To San Jose Sharks Patrick Davis; Michael Swift	To New Jersey Devils Jay Leach; Steven Zalewski
February 28, 2011	To Washington Capitals Jason Arnott	To New Jersey Devils Dave Steckel; 2nd-round pick in 2012

|}

=== Free agents acquired ===
Player	Former team	Contract terms
Dan Kelly	Kitchener Rangers	3 years, $1.75 million entry-level contract
Henrik Tallinder	Buffalo Sabres	4 years, $13.5 million
Anton Volchenkov	Ottawa Senators	6 years, $25.5 million
Johan Hedberg	Atlanta Thrashers	1 year, $1.5 million
Mark Fayne	Providence College	2 years, $1.085 million entry-level contract
Stephen Gionta	Lowell Devils	2 years, $1.025 million
Chad Wiseman	Springfield Falcons	1 year, $500,000
Adam Mair	Buffalo Sabres	1 year, $515,000
Joe Sova	University of Alaska Fairbanks	2 years, $1.13 million entry-level contract
Keith Kinkaid	Union College	2 years, $1.28 million entry-level contract

=== Free agents lost ===
Player	New team	Contract terms
Cory Murphy	ZSC Lions	2 years
Ilkka Pikkarainen	Timra IK	2 years
Paul Martin	Pittsburgh Penguins	5 years, $25 million
Martin Skoula	Avangard Omsk	1 year
Rob Niedermayer	Buffalo Sabres	1 year, $1.15 million
Ben Walter	Colorado Avalanche	1 year, $500,000
Andrew Peters	Florida Panthers	1 year, $500,000
Yann Danis	Amur Khabarovsk	undisclosed
Mike Mottau	New York Islanders	2 years, $1.6 million

=== Lost via waivers ===
Player	New team	Date claimed off waivers
Jay Pandolfo	None	N/A

=== Player signings ===
Player	Contract terms
Mattias Tedenby	3 years, $2.625 million entry-level contract
Jacob Josefson	3 years, $2.7 million entry-level contract
Eric Gelinas	3 years, $2.07 million entry-level contract
David Clarkson	3 years, $8 million
Mark Fraser	1 year, $500,000
Tyler Eckford	1 year, $550,000
Olivier Magnan	1 year, $500,000
Harry Young	3 years, $1.61 million entry-level contract
Jean-Sebastien Berube	3 years, $1.595 million entry-level contract
Patrick Davis	1 year, $500,000
Tim Sestito	1 year, $500,000
Ilya Kovalchuk	15 years, $100 million
Mike Hoeffel	2 years, $1.325 million entry-level contract

== Draft picks ==
New Jersey's picks at the 2010 NHL entry draft in Los Angeles.

Round	Pick	Player	Position	Nationality	Club Team
2	38 (from Atlanta)	Jon Merrill	D	United States	U.S. National Team Development Program (USHL)
3	84	Scott Wedgewood	G	Canada	Plymouth Whalers (OHL)
4	114	Joe Faust	D	United States	Bloomington Jefferson High School (USHS-MN)
6	174	Maxime Clermont	G	Canada	Gatineau Olympiques (QMJHL)
7	204	Mauro Jorg	RW	Switzerland	HC Lugano (NLA)

== Farm teams ==
The Albany Devils (relocated from Lowell) of the American Hockey League and the Trenton Devils of the ECHL remain the New Jersey Devils' minor league affiliates for the 2010–11 season.

== See also ==
- 2010–11 NHL season
