= 2010–11 Chicago Blackhawks season =

Professional ice hockey team season of play

2010–11 Chicago Blackhawks
- Division: 3rd Central
- Conference: 8th Western
- 2010–11 record: 44–29–9
- Home record: 24–17–0
- Road record: 20–12–9
- Goals for: 258
- Goals against: 225

Team information
- General manager: Stan Bowman
- Coach: Joel Quenneville
- Captain: Jonathan Toews
- Alternate captains: Duncan Keith; Patrick Sharp
- Arena: United Center
- Average attendance: 21,423 (108.6%); Total: 878,356

Team leaders
- Goals: Patrick Sharp (34)
- Assists: Patrick Kane (46)
- Points: Jonathan Toews (76)
- Penalty minutes: John Scott (72)
- Plus/minus: Brian Campbell (+28)
- Wins: Corey Crawford (33)
- Goals against average: Corey Crawford (2.30)

The 2010–11 Chicago Blackhawks season was the 85th season for the National Hockey League (NHL) franchise that was established on September 25, 1926. The team was nicknamed the "Hangover 'Hawks" for having to recover from paying the price of winning the franchise's first Stanley Cup in 49 years with adapting to the loss of several players from that team due to salary cap restrictions.

The defending Stanley Cup champion Blackhawks narrowly made the playoffs as the eighth and final seed in the Western Conference having clinched their playoff berth on the last day of the season. The Blackhawks lost their season finale 4–3 in regulation against the Detroit Red Wings on April 10, but still barely managed to clinch the last spot because of the Dallas Stars losing their finale later the same day 5–3 against the Minnesota Wild, and avoiding becoming the first Stanley Cup defending team since the 2006–07 Carolina Hurricanes to miss the playoffs after winning the championship. Had the Stars won their finale against the Wild in regulation or overtime, the Stars would’ve overtaken the defending Stanley Cup champion Blackhawks to the last playoff spot, which would’ve resulted in the Blackhawks dropping to ninth place in the West and missing the playoffs entirely by one point in the standings. In the opening round of the 2011 playoffs against the Presidents' Trophy-winning Vancouver Canucks, the Blackhawks lost the first three games of the series before winning the next three and were eventually succumbed to the Canucks in seven games in the first round, losing the seventh game 2–1 in overtime.

== Off-season ==
Under pressure to fit the team's player salaries under the salary cap for the 2010–11 season, the team began making trades shortly after winning the Stanley Cup. On June 24, the club traded Dustin Byfuglien, Ben Eager, Brent Sopel and Akim Aliu to the Atlanta Thrashers for Marty Reasoner, Joey Crabb, Jeremy Morin, a first-round pick (#24 overall) in 2010 and a second-round pick (#54 overall) in 2010. Later that same day, restricted free agent Colin Fraser was traded to the Edmonton Oilers for a sixth-round pick in 2010. On June 30, the Toronto Maple Leafs traded for right winger Kris Versteeg from Chicago in a five-player trade. The Maple Leafs gave up forwards Viktor Stalberg, Chris DiDomenico and Philippe Paradis. Toronto also acquired the rights to 21-year-old left winger Bill Sweatt, who was a second-round pick in 2007. On July 1, the Blackhawks traded Andrew Ladd to the Atlanta Thrashers for Ivan Vishnevskiy and a second-round draft pick in 2011. On July 9, Niklas Hjalmarsson was signed to an offer sheet by the San Jose Sharks, though the Blackhawks matched the offer on July 12, thereby retaining his services and forgoing compensation from the Sharks for signing a restricted free agent. This signing again put Chicago against the salary cap wall, and as a result forced the club to forego resigning goaltender Antti Niemi, who had filed for arbitration.

== Regular season ==
Defenseman Nick Leddy made his NHL debut on October 7, and he scored his first NHL goal on October 11. Evan Brophey made his NHL debut on October 23. Patrick Sharp had a record of 13 shots on goal, the highest shot total in a single game in Blackhawks history. Marian Hossa was named the NHL's Second Star of the Week for the week ending on October 18, and Duncan Keith was named Third Star of the Week for the week ending on November 1.

=== Division standings ===
Central Division
		GP	W	L	OTL	ROW	GF	GA	Pts
**1**	**y-Detroit Red Wings**	**82**	**47**	**25**	**10**	**43**	**261**	**241**	**104**
**2**	**Nashville Predators**	**82**	**44**	**27**	**11**	**38**	**219**	**194**	**99**
**3**	**Chicago Blackhawks**	**82**	**44**	**29**	**9**	**38**	**258**	**225**	**97**
4	St. Louis Blues	82	38	33	11	34	240	234	87
5	Columbus Blue Jackets	82	34	35	13	29	215	258	81

=== Conference standings ===
Western Conference
R		Div	GP	W	L	OTL	ROW	GF	GA	Pts
**1**	**p – Vancouver Canucks**	**NW**	**82**	**54**	**19**	**9**	**50**	**262**	**185**	117
**2**	**y – San Jose Sharks**	**PA**	**82**	**48**	**25**	**9**	**43**	**248**	**213**	105
**3**	**y – Detroit Red Wings**	**CE**	**82**	**47**	**25**	**10**	**43**	**261**	**241**	104
**4**	**Anaheim Ducks**	**PA**	**82**	**47**	**30**	**5**	**43**	**239**	**235**	99
**5**	**Nashville Predators**	**CE**	**82**	**44**	**27**	**11**	**38**	**219**	**194**	99
**6**	**Phoenix Coyotes**	**PA**	**82**	**43**	**26**	**13**	**38**	**231**	**226**	99
**7**	**Los Angeles Kings**	**PA**	**82**	**46**	**30**	**6**	**36**	**219**	**198**	98
**8**	**Chicago Blackhawks**	**CE**	**82**	**44**	**29**	**9**	**38**	**258**	**225**	97
8.5
9	Dallas Stars	PA	82	42	29	11	37	227	233	95
10	Calgary Flames	NW	82	41	29	12	32	250	237	94
11	St. Louis Blues	CE	82	38	33	11	34	240	234	87
12	Minnesota Wild	NW	82	39	35	8	36	206	233	86
13	Columbus Blue Jackets	CE	82	34	35	13	29	215	258	81
14	Colorado Avalanche	NW	82	30	44	8	24	227	288	68
15	Edmonton Oilers	NW	82	25	45	12	23	193	269	62

bold – qualified for playoffs; y – Won division; p – Won President's Trophy (best record in NHL)
CE – Central Division, NW – Northwest Division, PA – Pacific Division

== Schedule and results ==
Legend: Win (2 points) Loss (0 points) Overtime/shootout loss (1 point)

=== Pre-season ===
2010 Pre-season : 3–4–0 (Home: 3–0–0; Road: 0–4–0)
#	Date	Opponent	Score	OT	Decision	Arena	Attendance	Record	Recap
1	September 22*	@ Tampa Bay Lightning	4–2		Toivonen	MTS Centre	14,092	0–1–0	L1
2	September 24	@ Detroit Red Wings	3–2		Crawford	Joe Louis Arena	15,900	0–2–0	L2
3	September 25	Detroit Red Wings	4–2		Turco	United Center	20,553	1–2–0	W1
4	September 28	@ Pittsburgh Penguins	4–1		Richards	Consol Energy Center	18,087	1–3–0	L1
5	September 30	@ St. Louis Blues	4–1		Turco	Scottrade Center	11,624	1–4–0	L2
6	October 1	Pittsburgh Penguins	5–2		Crawford	United Center	19,913	2–4–0	W1
7	October 3	St. Louis Blues	4–3		Turco	United Center	19,692	3–4–0	W2
*Played in Winnipeg, Manitoba, Canada.

=== Regular season ===
2010–11 Season

October: 7–5–1 (Home: 4–4–0; Road: 3–1–1 ) Pts. 15
#	Date	Opponent	Score	OT	Decision	Arena	Attendance	Record	Pts	Recap
1	October 7	@ Colorado Avalanche	4–3	OT	Turco	Pepsi Center	18,007	0–0–1	1	OTL1
2	October 9	Detroit Red Wings	3–2		Turco	United Center	22,161	0–1–1	1	L1
3	October 11	@ Buffalo Sabres	4–3		Crawford	HSBC Arena	17,896	1–1–1	3	W1
4	October 13	Nashville Predators	3–2		Crawford	United Center	20,680	1–2–1	3	L1
5	October 15	@ Columbus Blue Jackets	5–2		Turco	Nationwide Arena	18,305	2–2–1	5	W1
6	October 16	Buffalo Sabres	4–3		Turco	United Center	21,293	3–2–1	7	W2
7	October 18	St. Louis Blues	3–2	OT	Turco	United Center	20,641	4–2–1	9	W3
8	October 20	Vancouver Canucks	2–1	SO	Turco	United Center	20,859	5–2–1	11	W4
9	October 22	@ St. Louis Blues	4–2		Turco	Scottrade Center	19,150	5–3–1	11	L1
10	October 23	Columbus Blue Jackets	3–2		Crawford	United Center	21,265	5–4–1	11	L2
11	October 27	Los Angeles Kings	3–1		Turco	United Center	20,667	6–4–1	13	W1
12	October 29	Edmonton Oilers	7–4		Crawford	United Center	21,061	6–5–1	13	L1
13	October 30	@ Minnesota Wild	3–1		Turco	Xcel Energy Center	18,376	7–5–1	15	W1

November: 7–6–1 (Home: 2–3–0; Road: 5–3–1) Pts. 15
#	Date	Opponent	Score	OT	Decision	Arena	Attendance	Record	Pts	Recap
14	November 1	@ New York Rangers	3–2		Turco	Madison Square Garden	18,200	7–6–1	15	L1
15	November 3	New Jersey Devils	5–3		Turco	United Center	21,044	7–7–1	15	L2
16	November 6	@ Atlanta Thrashers	5–4	SO	Turco	Philips Arena	16,022	8–7–1	17	W1
17	November 7	Edmonton Oilers	2–1		Crawford	United Center	21,025	8–8–1	17	L1
18	November 10	Phoenix Coyotes	2–1		Turco	United Center	21,181	8–9–1	17	L2
19	November 13	@ Nashville Predators	4–3	SO	Turco	Bridgestone Arena	17,113	8–9–2	18	OTL1
20	November 14	Anaheim Ducks	3–2	OT	Crawford	United Center	21,244	9–9–2	20	W1
21	November 17	@ Edmonton Oilers	5–0		Turco	Rexall Place	16,839	10–9–2	22	W2
22	November 19	@ Calgary Flames	7–2		Turco	Scotiabank Saddledome	19,289	10–10–2	22	L1
23	November 20	@ Vancouver Canucks	7–1		Crawford	Rogers Arena	18,860	11–10–2	24	W1
24	November 24	@ San Jose Sharks	5–2		Turco	HP Pavilion at San Jose	17,562	11–11–2	24	L1
25	November 26	@ Anaheim Ducks	4–1		Crawford	Honda Center	16,146	12–11–2	26	W1
26	November 27	@ Los Angeles Kings	2–1		Crawford	Staples Center	18,118	13–11–2	28	W2
27	November 30	St. Louis Blues	7–5		Crawford	United Center	21,140	14–11–2	30	W3

December: 6–5–1 (Home: 6–3–0; Road: 0–2–1) Pts. 13
#	Date	Opponent	Score	OT	Decision	Arena	Attendance	Record	Pts	Recap
28	December 3	Vancouver Canucks	3–0		Turco	United Center	21,737	14–12–2	30	L1
29	December 5	Calgary Flames	4–2		Crawford	United Center	21,112	15–12–2	32	W1
30	December 8	Dallas Stars	5–3		Crawford	United Center	21,184	16–12–2	34	W2
31	December 11	@ San Jose Sharks	2–1	OT	Crawford	HP Pavilion at San Jose	17,562	16–12–3	35	OTL1
32	December 13	@ Colorado Avalanche	7–5		Crawford	Pepsi Center	15,924	16–13–3	35	L1
33	December 15	Colorado Avalanche	4–3		Crawford	United Center	21,121	16–14–3	35	L2
34	December 17	Detroit Red Wings	4–1		Crawford	United Center	21,904	17–14–3	37	W1
35	December 19	Los Angeles Kings	3–2		Crawford	United Center	21,523	18–14–3	39	W2
36	December 22	Nashville Predators	4–1		Crawford	United Center	21,526	19–14–3	41	W3
37	December 26	Columbus Blue Jackets	4–1		Turco	United Center	21,492	20–14–3	43	W4
38	December 28	@ St. Louis Blues	3–1		Turco	Scottrade Center	19,150	20–15–3	43	L1
39	December 30	San Jose Sharks	5–3		Turco	United Center	22,112	20–16–3	43	L2

January: 6–4–1 (Home: 4–3–0; Road: 2–1–1) Pts. 13
#	Date	Opponent	Score	OT	Decision	Arena	Attendance	Record	Pts	Recap
40	January 2	@ Anaheim Ducks	2–1		Crawford	Honda Center	16,004	20–17–3	43	L3
41	January 3	@ Los Angeles Kings	4–3		Crawford	Staples Center	17,916	21–17–3	45	W1
42	January 5	Dallas Stars	4–2		Crawford	United Center	21,245	21–18–3	45	L1
43	January 7	Ottawa Senators	3–2	SO	Crawford	United Center	21,657	22–18–3	47	W1
44	January 9	New York Islanders	5–0		Crawford	United Center	21,205	23–18–3	49	W2
45	January 12	Colorado Avalanche	4–0		Crawford	United Center	21,356	24–18–3	51	W3
46	January 15	@ Nashville Predators	3–2	SO	Crawford	Bridgestone Arena	17,113	24–18–4	52	OTL1
47	January 16	Nashville Predators	6–3		Turco	United Center	21,387	25–18–4	54	W1
48	January 22	@ Detroit Red Wings	4–1		Crawford	Joe Louis Arena	20,066	26–18–4	56	W2
49	January 23	Philadelphia Flyers	4–1		Crawford	United Center	21,660	26–19–4	56	L1
50	January 25	Minnesota Wild	4–2		Crawford	United Center	21,247	26–20–4	56	L2

February: 8–3–2 (Home: 3–1–0; Road: 5–2–2) Pts. 18
#	Date	Opponent	Score	OT	Decision	Arena	Attendance	Record	Pts	Recap
51	February 1	@ Columbus Blue Jackets	7–4		Turco	Nationwide Arena	12,568	27–20–4	58	W1
52	February 4	@ Vancouver Canucks	4–3		Turco	Rogers Arena	18,860	27–21–4	58	L1
53	February 7	@ Calgary Flames	3–1		Crawford	Scotiabank Saddledome	19,289	27–22–4	58	L2
54	February 9	@ Edmonton Oilers	4–1		Crawford	Rexall Place	16,839	28–22–4	60	W1
55	February 11	@ Dallas Stars	4–3	SO	Turco	American Airlines Center	17,569	28–22–5	61	OTL1
56	February 12	@ Phoenix Coyotes	3–2	SO	Crawford	Jobing.com Arena	17,283	28–22–6	62	OTL2
57	February 16	Minnesota Wild	3–1		Crawford	United Center	21,535	29–22–6	64	W1
58	February 18	Columbus Blue Jackets	4–3		Crawford	United Center	21,708	29–23–6	64	L1
59	February 20	Pittsburgh Penguins	3–2	SO	Crawford	United Center	22,195	30–23–6	66	W1
60	February 21	@ St. Louis Blues	5–3		Crawford	Scottrade Center	19,150	31–23–6	68	W2
61	February 24	@ Nashville Predators	3–0		Crawford	Bridgestone Arena	17,113	32–23–6	70	W3
62	February 27	Phoenix Coyotes	4–3	SO	Crawford	United Center	21,473	33–23–6	72	W4
63	February 28	@ Minnesota Wild	4–2		Crawford	Xcel Energy Center	19,155	34–23–6	74	W5

March: 7–4–2 (Home: 4–1–0; Road: 3–3–2) Pts. 16
#	Date	Opponent	Score	OT	Decision	Arena	Attendance	Record	Pts	Recap
64	March 2	Calgary Flames	6–4		Crawford	United Center	20,896	35–23–6	76	W6
65	March 4	Carolina Hurricanes	5–2		Crawford	United Center	21,830	36–23–6	78	W7
66	March 5	@ Toronto Maple Leafs	5–3		Crawford	Air Canada Centre	19,646	37–23–6	80	W8
67	March 8	@ Florida Panthers	3–2		Turco	BankAtlantic Center	16,132	37–24–6	80	L1
68	March 9	@ Tampa Bay Lightning	4–3	SO	Crawford	St. Pete Times Forum	19,912	37–24–7	81	OTL1
69	March 13	@ Washington Capitals	4–3	OT	Crawford	Verizon Center	18,398	37–24–8	82	OTL2
70	March 14	San Jose Sharks	6–3		Crawford	United Center	22,094	38–24–8	84	W1
71	March 17	@ Dallas Stars	5–0		Turco	American Airlines Center	14,830	38–25–8	84	L1
72	March 20	@ Phoenix Coyotes	2–1		Crawford	Jobing.com Arena	17,328	39–25–8	86	W1
73	March 23	Florida Panthers	4–0		Crawford	United Center	21,713	40–25–8	88	W2
74	March 26	Anaheim Ducks	2–1		Crawford	United Center	22,115	40–26–8	88	L1
75	March 28	@ Detroit Red Wings	3–2	OT	Crawford	Joe Louis Arena	20,066	41–26–8	90	W1
76	March 29	@ Boston Bruins	3–0		Crawford	TD Garden	17,565	41–27–8	90	L1

April: 3–2–1 (Home: 1–2–0; Road: 2–0–1) Pts. 7
#	Date	Opponent	Score	OT	Decision	Arena	Attendance	Record	Pts	Recap
77	April 1	@ Columbus Blue Jackets	4–3	SO	Crawford	Nationwide Arena	16,217	42–27–8	92	W1
78	April 3	Tampa Bay Lightning	2–0		Crawford	United Center	21,587	42–28–8	92	L1
79	April 5	@ Montreal Canadiens	2–1	OT	Crawford	Bell Centre	21,273	42–28–9	93	OTL1
80	April 6	St. Louis Blues	4–3	OT	Crawford	United Center	21,435	43–28–9	95	W1
81	April 8	@ Detroit Red Wings	4–2		Crawford	Joe Louis Arena	20,066	44–28–9	97	W2
82	April 10	Detroit Red Wings	4–3		Crawford	United Center	22,046	44–29–9	97	L1

== Playoffs ==
The Blackhawks returned to the playoffs for the third straight season and were defending their championship of the Stanley Cup as the 8th and final seed. The Blackhawks played the Canucks for the third straight postseason. In the previous two rounds, the Blackhawks defeated the Canucks twice, four games to two. The Blackhawks were down three games to none, but managed to tie up the series facing elimination. The Blackhawks became just the seventh team in NHL history to come back to tie an 0–3 deficit in the playoffs. The Blackhawks lost in overtime in game seven to an Alex Burrows goal for a 2–1 loss.

2011 Stanley Cup Playoffs

Western Conference Quarterfinals vs. Vancouver Canucks (1) - Blackhawks lost series 4–3
Game	Date	Opponent	Score	OT	Decision	Arena	Attendance	Series	Recap
1	April 13	@ Vancouver Canucks	2–0		Crawford	Rogers Arena	18,860	0–1	L1
2	April 15	@ Vancouver Canucks	4–3		Crawford	Rogers Arena	18,860	0–2	L2
3	April 17	Vancouver Canucks	3–2		Crawford	United Center	21,743	0–3	L3
4	April 19	Vancouver Canucks	7–2		Crawford	United Center	21,757	1–3	W1
5	April 21	@ Vancouver Canucks	5–0		Crawford	Rogers Arena	18,860	2–3	W2
6	April 24	Vancouver Canucks	4–3	15:30 OT	Crawford	United Center	22,014	3–3	W3
7	April 26	@ Vancouver Canucks	2–1	5:22 OT	Crawford	Rogers Arena	18,860	3–4	L1

Legend: Win Loss

== Player statistics ==
=== Skaters ===
Note: Pos = Position; GP = Games played; G = Goals; A = Assists; Pts = Points; PIM = Penalty minutes; +/- = Plus/minus; PPG = Power-play goals; SHG = Short-handed goals; GWG = Game-winning goals

Regular season

Player	GP	G	A	Pts	+/−	PIM
Jonathan Toews	80	32	44	76	25	26
Patrick Kane	73	27	46	73	7	28
Patrick Sharp	74	34	37	71	−1	38
Marian Hossa	65	25	32	57	9	32
Brent Seabrook	82	9	39	48	0	47
Duncan Keith	82	7	38	45	−1	22
Tomas Kopecky	81	15	27	42	−13	60
Bryan Bickell	78	17	20	37	6	40
Dave Bolland	61	15	22	37	11	34
Troy Brouwer	79	17	19	36	−2	38
Brian Campbell	65	5	22	27	28	6
Viktor Stalberg	77	12	12	24	2	43
Jake Dowell	79	6	15	21	5	63
Jack Skille^{‡}	49	7	10	17	3	25
Fernando Pisani	60	7	9	16	0	10
Niklas Hjalmarsson	80	3	7	10	13	39
Michael Frolik^{†}	28	3	6	9	0	14
Nick Boynton^{‡}	41	1	7	8	2	36
Jassen Cullimore	36	0	8	8	4	8
Nick Leddy	46	4	3	7	−3	4
Chris Campoli^{†}	19	1	6	7	3	2
Ryan Johnson	34	1	5	6	−2	8
Jeremy Morin	9	2	1	3	2	9
Jordan Hendry	37	1	0	1	−2	4
John Scott	40	0	1	1	0	72
Ben Smith	6	1	0	1	1	0
Marcus Kruger	7	0	0	0	−4	4
Brandon Pirri	1	0	0	0	−1	0
Rob Klinkhammer	1	0	0	0	1	0
Evan Brophey	1	0	0	0	0	0
Ryan Potulny^{‡}	3	0	0	0	−1	0
Jeff Taffe	1	0	0	0	0	0

Playoffs

Player	GP	G	A	Pts	+/−	PIM
Duncan Keith	7	4	2	6	−3	6
Dave Bolland	4	2	4	6	6	4
Marian Hossa	7	2	4	6	0	2
Patrick Kane	7	1	5	6	−1	2
Patrick Sharp	7	3	2	5	1	2
Michael Frolik	7	2	3	5	3	2
Bryan Bickell	5	2	2	4	4	0
Jonathan Toews	7	1	3	4	−4	2
Ben Smith	7	3	0	3	−1	0
Brian Campbell	7	1	2	3	2	6
Niklas Hjalmarsson	7	0	2	2	4	2
Viktor Stalberg	7	1	0	1	0	5
Brent Seabrook	5	0	1	1	0	6
Chris Campoli	7	0	1	1	3	2
Marcus Kruger	5	0	1	1	2	0
Ryan Johnson	6	0	1	1	−1	2
Nick Leddy	7	0	0	0	−1	0
Troy Brouwer	7	0	0	0	2	11
John Scott	4	0	0	0	1	22
Fernando Pisani	3	0	0	0	−1	0
Jake Dowell	2	0	0	0	0	0
Tomas Kopecky	1	0	0	0	0	0

=== Goaltenders ===
Note: GP = Games played; Min = Minutes played; W = Wins; L = Losses; OT = Overtime losses; GA = Goals against; GAA= Goals against average; SA= Shots against; SV= Saves; Sv% = Save percentage; SO= Shutouts

Regular season

Player	GP	Min	W	L	OT	GA	GAA	SA	Sv%	SO	G	A	PIM
Corey Crawford	57	3,337	33	18	6	128	2.30	1,545	.917	4	0	1	2
Marty Turco	29	1,631	11	11	3	82	3.02	799	.897	1	0	0	6

Playoffs

Player	GP	Min	W	L	GA	GAA	SA	Sv%	SO	G	A	PIM
Corey Crawford	7	435	3	4	16	2.21	218	.927	1	0	2	0

^{†}Denotes player spent time with another team before joining Blackhawks. Stats reflect time with the Blackhawks only.
^{‡}Traded or released mid-season
Bold/italics denotes franchise record

=== Detailed records ===
Western Conference
Opponent	Home	Away	Total	Pts.	Goals scored	Goals allowed
Central Division
Chicago Blackhawks	-	-	-	-	-	-
Columbus Blue Jackets	1–2–0	3–0–0	4–2–0	8	25	17
Detroit Red Wings	1–2–0	3–0–0	4–2–0	8	20	13
Nashville Predators	2–1–0	1–0–2	3–1–2	8	20	14
St. Louis Blues	3–0–0	1–2–0	4–2–0	8	22	20
	7–5–0	8–2–2	15–7–2	32	87	64
Northwest Division
Calgary Flames	2–0–0	0–2–0	2–2–0	4	13	16
Colorado Avalanche	1–1–0	0–1–1	1–2–1	3	15	15
Edmonton Oilers	0–2–0	2–0–0	2–2–0	4	14	10
Minnesota Wild	1–1–0	2–0–0	3–1–0	6	12	8
Vancouver Canucks	1–1–0	1–1–0	2–2–0	4	12	9
	5–5–0	5–4–1	10–9–1	21	66	58
Pacific Division
Anaheim Ducks	1–1–0	1–1–0	2–2–0	4	9	7
Dallas Stars	1–1–0	0–1–1	1–2–1	3	10	16
Los Angeles Kings	2–0–0	2–0–0	4–0–0	8	12	7
Phoenix Coyotes	1–1–0	1–0–1	2–1–1	5	9	9
San Jose Sharks	1–1–0	0–1–1	1–2–1	3	13	15
	6–4–0	4–3–3	10–7–3	23	53	54

Eastern Conference
Opponent	Home	Away	Total	Pts.	Goals scored	Goals allowed
Atlantic Division
New Jersey Devils	0–1–0	0–0–0	0–1–0	0	3	5
New York Islanders	1–0–0	0–0–0	1–0–0	2	5	0
New York Rangers	0–0–0	0–1–0	0–1–0	0	2	3
Philadelphia Flyers	0–1–0	0–0–0	0–1–0	0	1	4
Pittsburgh Penguins	1–0–0	0–0–0	1–0–0	2	3	2
	2–2–0	0–1–0	2–3–0	4	14	14
Northeast Division
Boston Bruins	0–0–0	0–1–0	0–1–0	0	0	3
Buffalo Sabres	1–0–0	1–0–0	2–0–0	4	8	6
Montreal Canadiens	0–0–0	0–0–1	0–0–1	1	1	2
Ottawa Senators	1–0–0	0–0–0	1–0–0	2	3	2
Toronto Maple Leafs	0–0–0	1–0–0	1–0–0	2	5	3
	2–0–0	2–1–1	4–1–1	9	17	16
Southeast Division
Atlanta Thrashers	0–0–0	1–0–0	1–0–0	2	5	4
Carolina Hurricanes	1–0–0	0–0–0	1–0–0	2	5	2
Florida Panthers	1–0–0	0–1–0	1–1–0	2	6	3
Tampa Bay Lightning	0–1–0	0–0–1	0–1–1	1	3	6
Washington Capitals	0–0–0	0–0–1	0–0–1	1	3	4
	2–1–0	1–1–2	3–2–2	8	22	19

== Awards and records ==
=== Awards ===
Regular Season
Player	Award	Reached
Marian Hossa	NHL Second Star of the Week	October 18, 2010
Duncan Keith	NHL Third Star of the Week	November 1, 2010
Corey Crawford	NHL Second Star of the Week	February 28, 2011
Jonathan Toews	NHL First Star of the Month	February 2011

=== Milestones ===
Regular season
Player	Milestone	Reached
Nick Leddy	1st Career NHL Game	October 7, 2010
Brandon Pirri	1st Career NHL Game	October 9, 2010
Nick Leddy	1st Career NHL Goal; 1st Career NHL Point	October 11, 2010
Brent Seabrook	400th Career NHL Game	October 20, 2010
Duncan Keith	200th Career NHL Point	October 22, 2010
Evan Brophey	1st Career NHL Game	October 23, 2010
Ben Smith	1st Career NHL Game	October 29, 2010
Jonathan Toews	200th Career NHL Point	October 29, 2010
Jordan Hendry	100th Career NHL Game	November 1, 2010
Jeremy Morin	1st Career NHL Game	November 6, 2010
Jeremy Morin	1st Career NHL Assist; 1st Career NHL Point	November 30, 2010
Jassen Cullimore	800th Career NHL Game	December 8, 2010
Rob Klinkhammer	1st Career NHL Game	December 8, 2010
Jeremy Morin	1st Career NHL Goal	December 8, 2010
John Scott	100th Career NHL Game	December 28, 2010
Troy Brouwer	200th Career NHL Game	January 3, 2011
Brian Campbell	300th Career NHL Point	January 9, 2011
Tomas Kopecky	300th Career NHL Game	January 9, 2011
Dave Bolland	200th Career NHL Game; 100th Career NHL Point	January 16, 2011
Jonathan Toews	100th Career NHL Goal	January 16, 2011
Brian Campbell	600th Career NHL Game	February 4, 2011
Marian Hossa	800th Career NHL Point	February 12, 2011
Troy Brouwer	100th Career NHL Point	February 16, 2011
Patrick Sharp	300th Career NHL Point	February 24, 2011
Viktor Stalberg	100th Career NHL Game	March 2, 2011
Patrick Kane	300th Career NHL Game	March 4, 2011
Patrick Kane	100th Career NHL Goal	March 14, 2011
Nick Leddy	1st Career NHL Assist	March 20, 2011
Marcus Kruger	1st Career NHL Game	March 23, 2011
Chris Campoli	100th Career NHL Assist	March 28, 2011
Patrick Kane	300th Career NHL Point	April 5, 2011
Jake Dowell	100th Career NHL Game	April 6, 2011
Jonathan Toews	300th Career NHL Game	April 6, 2011
Bryan Bickell	100th Career NHL Game	April 8, 2011
Ryan Johnson	700th Career NHL Game	April 8, 2011
Ben Smith	1st Career NHL Goal; 1st Career NHL Point	April 8, 2011
Patrick Kane	200th Career NHL Assist	April 10, 2011

Playoffs
Player	Milestone	Reached
Jake Dowell	1st Career NHL Playoff Game	April 13, 2011
Michael Frolik	1st Career NHL Playoff Game	April 13, 2011
Nick Leddy	1st Career NHL Playoff Game	April 13, 2011
Ben Smith	1st Career NHL Playoff Game	April 13, 2011
Viktor Stalberg	1st Career NHL Playoff Game	April 13, 2011
Michael Frolik	1st Career NHL Playoff Assist; 1st Career NHL Playoff Point	April 15, 2011
Marcus Kruger	1st Career NHL Playoff Game	April 15, 2011
Ben Smith	1st Career NHL Playoff Goal; 1st Career NHL Playoff Point	April 15, 2011
Viktor Stalberg	1st Career NHL Playoff Goal; 1st Career NHL Playoff Point	April 15, 2011
John Scott	1st Career NHL Playoff Game	April 17, 2011
Bryan Bickell	1st Career NHL Playoff Goal	April 19, 2011
Corey Crawford	1st Career NHL Playoff Win	April 19, 2011
Michael Frolik	1st Career NHL Playoff Goal	April 19, 2011
Corey Crawford	1st Career NHL Playoff Shutout	April 21, 2011
Marcus Kruger	1st Career NHL Playoff Assist; 1st Career NHL Playoff Point	April 21, 2011

== Transactions ==
The Blackhawks have been involved in the following transactions during the 2010–11 season.

=== Trades ===
Date	Details
June 24, 2010	To Atlanta Thrashers Dustin Byfuglien; Ben Eager; Brent Sopel; Akim Aliu	To Chicago Blackhawks Marty Reasoner; Joey Crabb; Jeremy Morin; 1st-round pick in 2010 – Kevin Hayes; 2nd-round pick in 2010 – Justin Holl
June 24, 2010	To Edmonton Oilers Colin Fraser	To Chicago Blackhawks 6th-round pick in 2010 – Mirko Hofflin
June 25, 2010	To New York Islanders 1st-round pick in 2010 – Brock Nelson	To Chicago Blackhawks 2nd-round pick in 2010 – Ludvig Rensfeldt; 2nd-round pick in 2010 – Kent Simpson
June 26, 2010	To Toronto Maple Leafs 2nd-round pick in 2010 – Bradley Ross	To Chicago Blackhawks Jimmy Hayes
June 26, 2010	To Boston Bruins 7th-round pick in 2010 – Zach Trotman	To Chicago Blackhawks 7th-round pick in 2011 – Johan Mattsson
June 30, 2010	To Toronto Maple Leafs Kris Versteeg; Bill Sweatt	To Chicago Blackhawks Viktor Stalberg; Chris DiDomenico; Philippe Paradis
July 1, 2010	To Atlanta Thrashers Andrew Ladd	To Chicago Blackhawks Ivan Vishnevskiy; 2nd-round pick in 2011 – Adam Clendening
July 22, 2010	To Florida Panthers Marty Reasoner	To Chicago Blackhawks Jeff Taffe
February 9, 2011	To Florida Panthers Jack Skille; Hugh Jessiman; David Pacan	To Chicago Blackhawks Michael Frolik; Alexander Salak
February 28, 2011	To Ottawa Senators Ryan Potulny; Conditional 2nd-round pick in 2011 (Note: Pick later traded to Detroit Red Wings.) – Xavier Ouellet	To Chicago Blackhawks Chris Campoli; Conditional 7th-round pick in 2012 (Note: Condition not satisfied.)

=== Free agents acquired ===
Player	Former team	Contract terms
Mathis Olimb	Frölunda HC	1 year, $600,000 entry-level contract
John Scott	Minnesota Wild	2 years, $1.025 million
Marty Turco	Dallas Stars	1 year, $1.3 million
Hugh Jessiman	Milwaukee Admirals	1 year, $500,000
Fernando Pisani	Edmonton Oilers	1 year, $500,000
Ryan Potulny	Edmonton Oilers	1 year, $500,000
Garnet Exelby	Toronto Maple Leafs	1 year, $500,000
Ryan Johnson	Vancouver Canucks	1 year, $500,000

=== Free agents lost ===
Player	New team	Contract terms
Joey Crabb	Toronto Maple Leafs	1 year, $525,000
Richard Petiot	Edmonton Oilers	1 year, $550,000
Adam Burish	Dallas Stars	2 years, $2.3 million
Kyle Greentree	Washington Capitals	2 years, $1.025 million
Danny Richmond	Toronto Maple Leafs	1 year, $550,000
John Madden	Minnesota Wild	1 year, $1 million
Antti Niemi	San Jose Sharks	1 year, $2 million

=== Lost via waivers ===
Player	New team	Date claimed off waivers
Nick Boynton	Philadelphia Flyers	February 26, 2011

=== Player signings ===
Player	Contract terms
Marcus Kruger	3 years, $2.205 million entry-level contract
Niklas Hjalmarsson	4 years, $14 million
Bryan Bickell	3 years, $1.625 million
Jack Skille	1 year, $600,000
Nick Leddy	3 years, $4.2 million entry-level contract
Igor Makarov	2 years, $1.105 million entry-level contract
Evan Brophey	1 year, $500,000
Nathan Davis	1 year, $500,000
Jassen Cullimore	1 year, $500,000
Hannu Toivonen	1 year, $550,000
Jordan Hendry	1 year, $600,000
Nick Boynton	1 year, $500,000
Brandon Pirri	3 years, $1.945 million entry-level contract
Dylan Olsen	3 year entry-level contract
Brent Seabrook	5 years, $29 million contract extension
Jimmy Hayes	3 years, $1.9625 million entry-level contract
Joe Lavin	2 years, $1.18 million entry-level contract

== Draft picks ==
The 2010 NHL entry draft was at Staples Center in Los Angeles, California, on June 25 and 26, 2010. The Blackhawks picked 30th in each round. The Blackhawks were active in trading, moving up from 30th in the draft to 24th to select Kevin Hayes. Through other trades, the Blackhawks picked up three selections in the second round, and had ten selections overall in the draft.

Round	#	Player	Position	Nationality	College/Junior/Club team (League)
1	24 (from Atlanta via New Jersey)	Kevin Hayes	RW	United States	Noble and Greenough School (USHS-MA)
2	35 (from NY Islanders)	Ludvig Rensfeldt	C	Sweden	Brynäs IF (J20 SuperElit)
2	54 (from New Jersey via Atlanta)	Justin Holl	D	United States	Omaha Lancers (USHL)
2	58 (from San Jose via Ottawa via NY Islanders)	Kent Simpson	G	Canada	Everett Silvertips (WHL)
2	60	Stephen Johns	D	United States	U.S. National Team Development Program (USHL)
3	90	Joakim Nordstrom	C	Sweden	AIK IF (Elitserien Jr.)
4	120	Rob Flick	C	Canada	Mississauga St. Michael's Majors (OHL)
6	151 (from Edmonton)	Mirko Hofflin	C	Germany	Adler Mannheim Jr. (Germany Jr.)
6	180	Nick Mattson	D	United States	Indiana Ice (USHL)
7	191 (from Dallas)	Macmillan Carruth	G	United States	Portland Winterhawks (WHL)

== See also ==
- 2010–11 NHL season
