= 2019 Spengler Cup =

Tournament details
- Host country: Switzerland
- Venue: Eisstadion Davos
- Dates: 26–31 December
- Teams: 6

Final positions
- Champions: Team Canada (16th title)
- Runners-up: (Czech Republic) HC Oceláři Třinec

Tournament statistics
- Games played: 11
- Goals scored: 55 (5 per game)
- Attendance: 68,048 (6,186 per game)
- Scoring leader: (Canada) Kevin Clark (8 points)

Official website
- Spengler Cup

The 2019 Spengler Cup was held from 26 to 31 December 2019 at Eisstadion Davos, in Davos, Switzerland.

== Teams participating ==
- Team Canada
- (Czech Republic) HC Oceláři Třinec
- (Finland) HC TPS
- (Russia) Salavat Yulaev Ufa
- (Switzerland) HC Ambrì-Piotta
- (Switzerland) HC Davos (host)

== Group stage ==
All times are local (UTC+1).

=== Group Torriani ===
Pos	Team	Pld	W	OTW	OTL	L	GF	GA	GD	Pts	Qualification
1	(Switzerland) HC Ambrì-Piotta	2	2	0	0	0	7	1	+6	6	Semifinals
2	(Finland) HC TPS	2	1	0	0	1	4	6	−2	3	Quarterfinals
3	(Russia) Salavat Yulaev Ufa	2	0	0	0	2	4	8	−4	0	Quarterfinals

26 December 2019; 15:10	HC Ambrì-Piotta (Switzerland)	4–1 (2–0, 1–1, 1–0)	(Russia) Salavat Yulaev Ufa	Eisstadion Davos; Attendance: 6,300

Game reference

Daniel Manzato
Goalies
Andrei Kareyev
Referees:
(Russia) Yevgeni Romasko
(Switzerland) Daniel Stricker
Linesmen:
(Switzerland) Roman Kaderli
(Russia) Dmitry Shishlo

Sabolič (Zwerger, Fischer) – 02:28	1–0
D'Agostini (Fora, Egli) (SH) – 15:46	2–0
Müller (Zwerger, Miranda) (PP) – 23:33	3–0
	3–1	38:39 – Lisovets (Omark, Burmistrov)
Müller (ENG) – 59:42	4–1

6 min
Penalties
10 min
30
Shots
33

27 December 2019; 15:10	HC TPS (Finland)	4–3 (1–1, 3–0, 0–2)	(Russia) Salavat Yulaev Ufa	Eisstadion Davos; Attendance: 6,300

Game reference

Rasmus Tirronen
Goalies
Vladimir Sokhatsky
Referees:
(Switzerland) Micha Hebeisen
(Finland) Anssi Salonen
Linesmen:
(Finland) Lauri Nikulainen
(Switzerland) Dominik Schlegel

Lehtinen (Pajuniemi, Holm) (PP) – 05:50	1–0
	1–1	12:01 – Gimatov (Kartaev, Tsulygin)
Anttalainen (Korpikoski, Filppula) – 30:51	2–1
Sund (Nurmi) – 32:30	3–1
Filppula (Windlert, Korpikoski) – 35:08	4–1
	4–2	55:36 – Gareev
	4–3	59:29 – Amirov (Tsulgyin, Baranov) (EA)

2 min
Penalties
8 min
38
Shots
22

28 December 2019; 15:10	HC Ambrì-Piotta (Switzerland)	3–0 (0–0, 2–0, 1–0)	(Finland) HC TPS	Eisstadion Davos; Attendance: 6,300

Game reference

Ludovic Waeber
Goalies
Julius Pohjanoksa
Referees:
(United States) Mark Lemelin
(Switzerland) Marc Wiegand
Linesmen:
(Switzerland) Roman Kaderli
(Switzerland) Dominik Schlegel

Flynn (Douay) (SH) – 28:59	1–0
D'Agostini (Flynn, Sabolič) – 35:34	2–0
D'Agostini (ENG) – 58:42	3–0

10 min
Penalties
14 min
20
Shots
32

=== Group Cattini ===
Pos	Team	Pld	W	OTW	OTL	L	GF	GA	GD	Pts	Qualification
1	Team Canada	2	2	0	0	0	9	2	+7	6	Semifinals
2	(Czech Republic) HC Oceláři Třinec	2	1	0	0	1	5	5	0	3	Quarterfinals
3	(Switzerland) HC Davos (H)	2	0	0	0	2	2	9	−7	0	Quarterfinals

(H) Host

26 December 2019; 20:15	HC Oceláři Třinec (Czech Republic)	1–4 (0–1, 1–2, 0–1)	Team Canada	Eisstadion Davos; Attendance: 6,006

Game reference

Petr Kváča
Goalies
Zachary Fucale
Referees:
(United States) Mark Lemelin
(Switzerland) Marc Wiegand
Linesmen:
(Switzerland) Balazs Kovacs
(Switzerland) Marc-Henri Progin

	0–1	05:45 – Versteeg (Jeffrey, Tambellini) (PP)
	0–2	22:06 – Clark (Noreau, Tambellini) (PP)
	0–3	26:59 – Clark (Mitchell, Wiercioch)
Chmielewski (Musil, Adamský) – 28:31	1–3
	1–4	58:59 – Clark (ENG)

12 min
Penalties
4 min
28
Shots
37

27 December 2019; 20:15	HC Davos (Switzerland)	1–4 (0–1, 0–0, 1–3)	(Czech Republic) HC Oceláři Třinec	Eisstadion Davos; Attendance: 6,300

Game reference

Joren van Pottelberghe
Goalies
Jakub Štěpánek
Referees:
(United States) Mark Lemelin
(Switzerland) Daniel Stricker
Linesmen:
(Switzerland) Balazs Kovacs
(Russia) Dmitry Shishlo

	0–1	14:07 – O. Kovařčík (Martynek, Zahradníček)
Pesonen (Kessler, Rantakari) (PP) – 40:35	1–1
	1–2	57:19 – Martynek (M. Kovařčík, Gernát)
	1–3	58:34 – Polanský (Chmielewski, Doudera) (ENG)
	1–4	59:59 – O. Kovařčík (ENG)

6 min
Penalties
8 min
17
Shots
28

28 December 2019; 20:15	Team Canada	5–1 (2–0, 3–0, 0–1)	(Switzerland) HC Davos	Eisstadion Davos; Attendance: 6,300

Game reference

Matt Tomkins
Goalies
Joren van Pottelberghe
Referees:
(Switzerland) Micha Hebeisen / (Switzerland) Daniel Stricker
(Russia) Yevgeni Romasko
Linesmen:
(Finland) Lauri Nikulainen
(Switzerland) Marc-Henri Progin

MacDonald (Grant, Upshall) – 02:18	1–0
Jeffrey (Jooris, Maione) – 03:30	2–0
Fehr (Winnik, Wiercioch) – 27:16	3–0
Clark (Versteeg) – 30:38	4–0
Grant (DiDomenico, Maxwell) – 37:16	5–0
	5–1	44:39 – Hischier (Rantakari, Corvi) (PP)

14 min
Penalties
8 min
34
Shots
23

== Knockout stage ==
=== Bracket ===
Quarterfinals
29 December
(Finland) HC TPS	3
(Switzerland) HC Davos	1
29 December
(Czech Republic) HC Oceláři Třinec	3
(Russia) Salavat Yulaev Ufa	2

Semifinals
30 December
Team Canada	6
(Finland) HC TPS	0
30 December
(Switzerland) HC Ambrì-Piotta	2
(Czech Republic) HC Oceláři Třinec (OT)	3

Final
31 December
Team Canada	4
(Czech Republic) HC Oceláři Třinec	0

=== Quarterfinals ===
29 December 2019; 15:10	HC TPS (Finland)	3–1 (1–1, 0–0, 2–0)	(Switzerland) HC Davos	Eisstadion Davos; Attendance: 6,036

Game reference

Rasmus Tirronen
Goalies
Sandro Aeschlimann
Referees:
(United States) Mark Lemelin
(Russia) Yevgeni Romasko
Linesmen:
(Switzerland) Roman Kaderli
(Finland) Lauri Nikulainen

	0–1	08:42 – Frehner (Nygren, Meyer)
Pajuniemi (Pärssinen) – 15:44	1–1
Janatuinen (Wirtanen) – 48:42	2–1
Janatuinen (Karvonen) – 55:53	3–1

4 min
Penalties
6 min
20
Shots
30

29 December 2019; 20:15	HC Oceláři Třinec (Czech Republic)	3–2 (1–0, 1–2, 1–0)	(Russia) Salavat Yulaev Ufa	Eisstadion Davos; Attendance: 5,606

Game reference

Jakub Štěpánek
Goalies
Andrei Kareyev
Referees:
(Finland) Anssi Salonen
(Switzerland) Daniel Stricker
Linesmen:
(Switzerland) Dominik Schlegel
(Russia) Dmitry Shishlo

Polanský (Adamský, Chmielewski) – 04:36	1–0
Stránský (Dravecký) – 20:45	2–0
	2–1	21:15 – Kruchinin (Gimatov, Kartayev)
	2–2	35:08 – Bashkirov (Pimenov, Solodukhin)
Martynek (Chmielevski, Doudera) (PP) – 50:39	3–2

8 min
Penalties
8 min
30
Shots
30

=== Semifinals ===
30 December 2019; 15:10	Team Canada	6–0 (2–0, 1–0, 3–0)	(Finland) HC TPS	Eisstadion Davos; Attendance: 6,300

Game reference

Zachary Fucale
Goalies
Rasmus Torrinen
Julius Pohjanoksa
Referees:
(Switzerland) Daniel Stricker
(Switzerland) Marc Wiegand
Linesmen:
(Switzerland) Balazs Kovacs
(Switzerland) Dominik Schlegel

Clark (Jeffrey, Noreau) (PP) — 04:40	1–0
Postma (Danforth, Faille) — 15:35	2–0
DiDomenico (Postma, Fehr) (PP) — 33:33	3–0
Faille (DiDomenico, MacDonald) — 42:53	4–0
Versteeg (Clark, Maione) — 44:47	5–0
Clark (Jeffrey, Upshall) — 57:58	6–0

10 min
Penalties
22 min
31
Shots
19

30 December 2019; 20:15	HC Ambrì-Piotta (Switzerland)	2–3 OT (1–0, 0–1, 1–1) (OT: 0–1)	(Czech Republic) HC Oceláři Třinec	Eisstadion Davos; Attendance: 6,300

Game reference

Daniel Manzato
Goalies
Petr Kváča
Referees:
(Switzerland) Micha Hebeisen
(Finland) Anssi Salonen
Linesmen:
(Switzerland) Marc-Henri Progin
(Russia) Dmitry Shishlo

Dal Pian (Incir, Douay) – 04:37	1–0
	1–1	39:14 – O. Kovařčík (Martynek, M. Kovařčík)
	1–2	45:25 – Dravecký (Gernát, Stránský)
Flynn (Jelovac) – 51:06	2–2
	2–3	61:46 – Stránský (Martynek, Musil)

4 min
Penalties
8 min
37
Shots
34

=== Final ===
31 December 2019; 12:10	Team Canada	4–0 (0–0, 3–0, 1–0)	(Czech Republic) HC Oceláři Třinec	Eisstadion Davos; Attendance: 6,300

Game reference

Zachary Fucale
Goalies
Jakub Štěpánek
Referees:
(United States) Mark Lemelin
(Russia) Yevgeni Romasko
Linesmen:
(Switzerland) Roman Kaderli
(Finland) Lauri Nikulainen

Jeffrey (Tambellini, Versteeg) (PP) — 29:02	1–0
Mitchell (Noreau, Clark) (PP2) — 31:40	2–0
Versteeg (Noreau, Jeffrey) (PP2) — 33:09	3–0
Jeffrey (Noreau) — 44:55	4–0

4 min
Penalties
10 min
37
Shots
26

== All-Star Team ==
Position	Player	Team
Goaltender	(Canada) Zach Fucale	Team Canada
Defencemen	(Canada) Maxim Noreau	Team Canada
Defencemen	(Slovakia) Martin Gernát	(Czech Republic) HC Oceláři Třinec
Forwards	(Canada) Kevin Clark	Team Canada
Forwards	(Canada) Matt D'Agostini	(Switzerland) HC Ambrì-Piotta
Forwards	(Poland) Aron Chmielewski	(Czech Republic) HC Oceláři Třinec
