= Viktor Stålberg =

Swedish ice hockey player (born 1986)

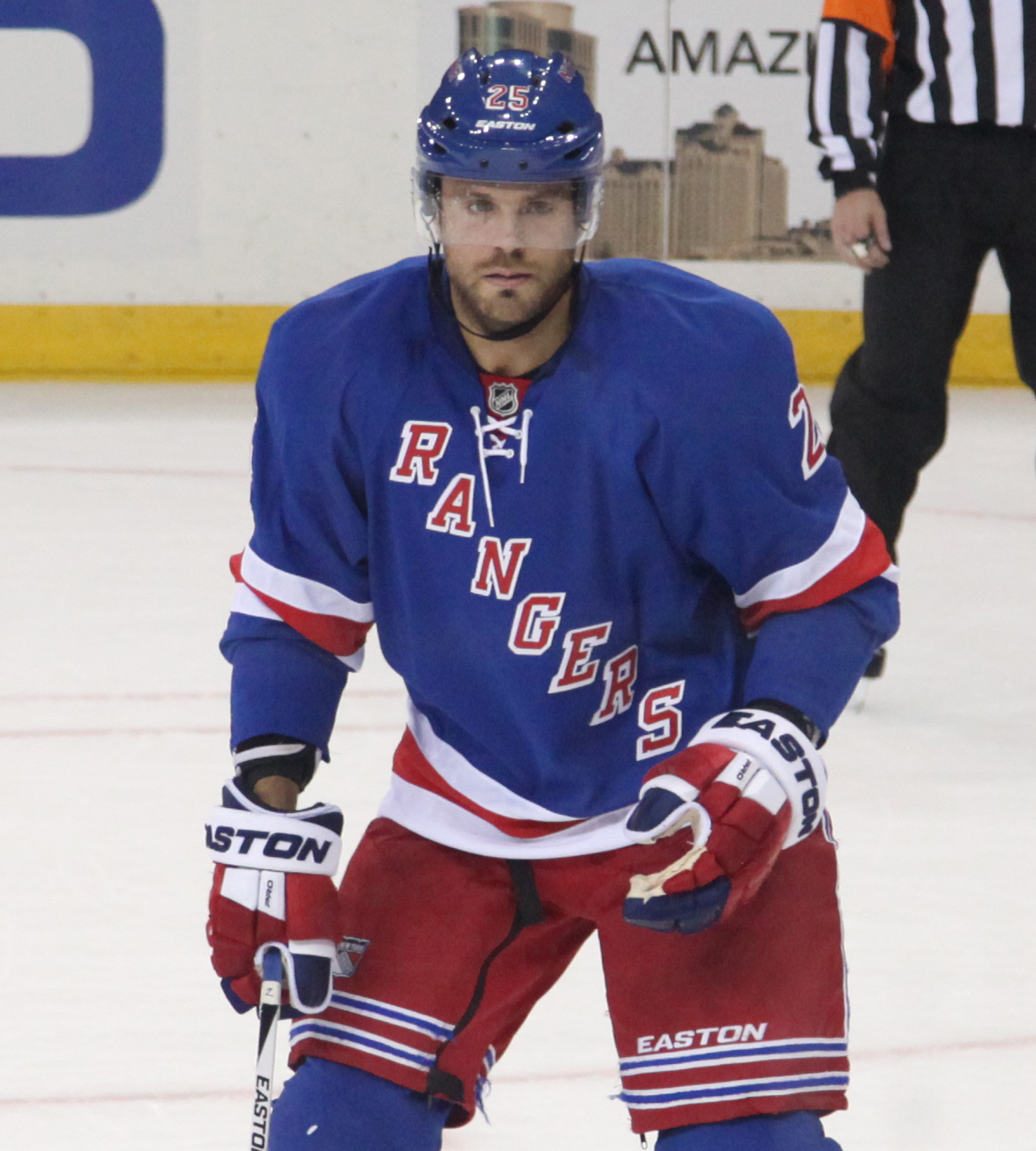
- Stålberg with the New York Rangers in September 2015
- Born: 17 January 1986 (age 40) Gothenburg, Sweden
- Height: 6 ft 3 in (191 cm)
- Weight: 209 lb (95 kg; 14 st 13 lb)
- Position: Right wing
- Shot: Left
- Played for: Toronto Maple Leafs; Chicago Blackhawks; Frölunda HC; Atlant Moscow Oblast; Nashville Predators; New York Rangers; Carolina Hurricanes; Ottawa Senators; EV Zug; Avangard Omsk; HC Fribourg-Gottéron
- National team: Sweden
- NHL draft: 161st overall, 2006; Toronto Maple Leafs
- Playing career: 2009–2021

Viktor Stålberg (born 17 January 1986) is a Swedish former professional ice hockey winger. He played in the National Hockey League (NHL) for the Toronto Maple Leafs, Nashville Predators, New York Rangers, Carolina Hurricanes, Ottawa Senators and Chicago Blackhawks with whom he won the Stanley Cup in 2013.

== Playing career ==
=== Amateur ===
During the 2005–06 season, Stålberg played for Frölunda HC in the J20 SuperElit. He led the team in scoring with 33 goals and 31 assists in 48 games during the regular season and playoffs. After this season, Stålberg was drafted by the Toronto Maple Leafs in the 6th round (161st overall) of the 2006 NHL entry draft.

Stålberg joined the University of Vermont, hitting the ice for his freshman season in 2006–07. He was one of only two freshmen on the team who played in all 39 of the club's games that season. He finished the season with 7 goals and 8 assists for 15 points. During the season, he was named Hockey East Rookie of the Week on 13 November 2006, as well as being named to the Hockey East Weekly Honor Roll. At the end of the season, Stålberg was named to the Hockey East All-Academic Team.

During his sophomore season in 2007–08, Stålberg again played in all 39 games for the Catamounts, scoring 10 goals and adding 13 assists. During the year, he was named Hockey East Player of the Week three times, and was also named to the Hockey East Weekly Honor Roll three times. At the end of the season, he was an honorable mention Hockey East All-Star and had earned a spot on the Hockey East All-Academic Team.

During his junior year at Vermont, Stålberg again played in 39 games, scoring 24 goals and adding 22 assists. His 24 goals ranked fourth in the nation, and he led Vermont in points. He garnered many individual honors during this season. He was one of the ten finalists for the Hobey Baker Memorial Award. He was the first player from the University of Vermont to be a finalist for the award since Martin St. Louis. He was the fourth player in program history to be named a finalist for the Hobey Baker award after Kirk McCaskill '83 (1982), Eric Perrin '97 (1996) and Martin St. Louis '97 (1995, 1996, 1997). He was named the Hockey East Player of the Month for January, and picked up two Hockey East Player of the Week honors. During this year he and his teammates made it to the Frozen Four. Stalberg was also named a Division I First-Team All-American in 2008-09.

=== Professional (2009–2021) ===
==== Toronto Maple Leafs (2009–2010) ====
After his successful junior campaign at the University of Vermont, Stålberg decided to turn pro, signing a two-year, entry-level contract with the Maple Leafs on 14 April 2009. Immediately after signing his contract, Stålberg was assigned to the Toronto Marlies of the American Hockey League due to the 2008–09 season having already concluded for the Maple Leafs and the Maple Leafs not qualifying for the playoffs. He made his professional debut with the Marlies during the 2009 AHL playoffs where he would play two games and would be held goalless with an assist for a lone point.

Stålberg made his NHL debut in the 2009–10 season opener on 1 October 2009 in a 4–3 OT loss to the Montreal Canadiens. In that game, Stålberg recorded his first career assist and point with an assist on a goal scored by Matt Stajan. On 6 October, the third game of the season and Stålberg's third NHL game in a Maple Leafs 2–1 win over the Ottawa Senators, he sustained a concussion after being on the receiving end of an open-ice hit by Senators defenseman Anton Volchenkov, causing him to miss the next two games. On 18 December, Stålberg recorded his first NHL goal in a 5–2 loss to the Buffalo Sabres against Sabres goaltender Ryan Miller. Three days later in another game against the Sabres, Stålberg suffered a shoulder injury after being hit by Sabres forward Adam Mair, causing him to miss the next four games. Stålberg finished his rookie season playing in 40 games with 14 points recorded (nine goals, five assists).

==== Chicago Blackhawks (2010–2013) ====
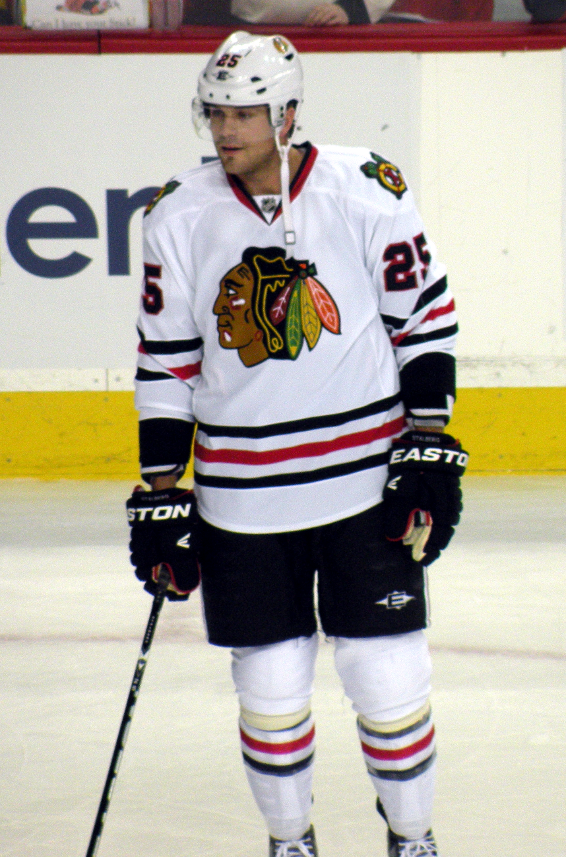
Stalberg during his tenure with the Chicago Blackhawks in February 2012.

On 30 June 2010, Stålberg was traded along with prospects Philippe Paradis and Chris DiDomenico to the newly crowned Stanley Cup champion Chicago Blackhawks in exchange for Kris Versteeg and prospect Bill Sweatt. On 15 December, Stålberg suffered a concussion in a 4–3 loss against the Colorado Avalanche after getting hit by Avalanche defenseman Ryan O'Byrne that led to Stålberg missing the next three games. Stålberg finished the 2010–11 season, his first season with the Blackhawks and second season in the NHL altogether with 12 goals and assists for 24 points in 77 games. After the defending Stanley Cup champion Blackhawks narrowly made the 2011 playoffs as the eighth and final seed in the Western Conference, Stålberg made his Stanley Cup playoff debut on 13 April 2011 in game one of the Blackhawks first round series against the Presidents' Trophy-winning Vancouver Canucks and scored his first career playoff goal two days later on 15 April in game two on Canucks goaltender Roberto Luongo. After losing the first three games, the Blackhawks would recover to win the next three games to force a game seven, which they lost in overtime 2–1 for a 4–3 series defeat. Stålberg ended his first playoffs with one goal and no assists for one point in all seven games played.

On 10 July 2011, Stålberg signed a two-year extension with the Blackhawks, taking him until the 2012–13 season. Stålberg would miss the first three games of the 2011–12 season due to a knee injury initially sustained on 28 September in a 4–3 win in a pre-season game against the Detroit Red Wings after a knee-on-knee collision with Red Wings forward Justin Abdelkader. After returning to the Blackhawks lineup, Stålberg would go on to enjoy a breakout season. On 10 January 2012, Stålberg recorded his first career hat trick in a 5–2 Blackhawks win against the Columbus Blue Jackets. Stålberg finished his career season with career highs in goals (22), assists (21) and points (43) in the final 79 games played. In game two of the first round of the 2012 playoffs against the Phoenix Coyotes on 14 April 2012, Stålberg recorded his first career playoff assist on an overtime-winning goal scored by Bryan Bickell. The Blackhawks would eventually get defeated in six games by the Coyotes and Stålberg was goalless but recorded two assists for two points in all six games played

In the lockout-shortened 2012–13 season, Stålberg recorded nine goals and 14 assists for 23 points in 47 games as the Blackhawks won the Presidents' Trophy as regular season champions. Stålberg and the Blackhawks would go on to win the Stanley Cup in 2013 after they defeated the Minnesota Wild in five games, Detroit Red Wings in seven games and the defending Stanley Cup champion Los Angeles Kings in five games in the first three rounds before defeating the Boston Bruins in the 2013 Stanley Cup Final in six games. He finished the 2013 playoffs goalless but recorded three assists and points in 19 games.

==== Nashville Predators (2013–2015) ====
On the back of his success in the post-season with the Chicago Blackhawks and unable to negotiate a contract extension with the club, Stålberg left the Blackhawks as a free agent and signed a four-year deal worth $12 million with the Nashville Predators on 5 July 2013. On 24 September, Stålberg suffered a sprained AC joint in a pre-season game against the Tampa Bay Lightning from a check by Lightning' defenseman Dmitry Korobov and missed the first four games of the 2013–14 regular season. He eventually ended the season playing in 70 games with eight goals, 10 assists for 18 points.

In the 2014–15 season, his second season with the Predators and sixth in the NHL, failing to live up to the expectations of his contract largely due to knee and shoulder injuries, Stålberg was demoted to AHL affiliate, the Milwaukee Admirals for portions the 2014–15 season. He was however summoned back to the Predators towards the end of the 2014–15 season and for the 2015 playoffs in which the Predators lost in the first round in six games to Stålberg's former team and the eventual Stanley Cup champion Chicago Blackhawks. On 30 June 2015, after he was placed on unconditional waivers, Stålberg was bought out from the remaining two-years of his contract with the Predators and released to free agency.

==== New York Rangers (2015–2016) ====
On 1 July 2015, with the ambition to reclaim his status in the NHL after the Predators bought out the remainder of his previous deal, Stålberg was signed to a one-year $1.1 million contract with the New York Rangers. Despite an early season concussion on 24 October 2015 against the Philadelphia Flyers from a hit by Flyers' defenseman Radko Gudas, causing him to miss the next two games, Stålberg enjoyed early offensive success, securing a role on the checking line and occasional time on the team's penalty killing unit as the season went on. In 75 games for the 2015–16 season with the Rangers, Stålberg contributed with nine goals, 11 assists and 20 points. He was held pointless in all five games in the Rangers first round exit in five games in the 2016 playoffs against the Pittsburgh Penguins.

==== Carolina Hurricanes (2016–2017) ====
On 1 July 2016, Stålberg left the Rangers as a free agent, agreeing to a one-year $1.5 million deal with the Carolina Hurricanes.

==== Ottawa Senators (2017) ====
In the 2016–17 season, after recording 12 points (nine goals, three assists) in 57 contests with the Hurricanes, who were out of playoff contention, Stålberg was traded to the Ottawa Senators in exchange for a 2017 third-round draft choice on 28 February 2017. After finishing the remainder of the season with two goals and two assists for four points in 18 games, Stålberg and the Senators would go on a lengthy playoff run in the 2017 playoffs by defeating the Boston Bruins in six games and Stålberg's former team, the New York Rangers in six games in the first two rounds before losing to the Pittsburgh Penguins in the third round in seven games, one win short from the Stanley Cup Final. Stålberg finished the 2017 playoffs playing in 17 games with no goals, two assists and points recorded. After the playoffs ended, it was revealed that many players on the Senators had been playing through injuries including Stålberg himself, who had played through rib and abdominal injuries.

==== Stints in the Kontinental Hockey League and Swiss National League (2017–2021) ====
Unable to gain a contract extension with the Senators or a new contract with any other NHL team, Stålberg left the NHL as a free agent after eight seasons and agreed to a two-year contract with EV Zug of the National League (NL) on 11 July 2017. He instantly became an impact player in Switzerland, collecting 22 goals and 50 points in 48 games and in the 2017–18 season. Placing fourth in league points, Stålberg also earned selection to the NL Media All-Star Team and named as the NL Media's Best Forward.

In the following 2018–19 season, Stålberg appeared in just 10 games before receiving and accepting a contract offer for the remainder of the year to leave Zug and move to the Kontinental Hockey League with Avangard Omsk on 30 October 2018.

On 26 April 2019, Stålberg returned to Switzerland and agreed to a two-year contract through the 2020–21 season with HC Fribourg-Gottéron.

On 13 August 2021, Stålberg announced his retirement from professional ice hockey.

== Post-playing career ==
On 25 September 2023, Stålberg was named by his former school, the University of Vermont, as an advisor to the coaching staff for the men's ice hockey team, serving in the position on a part-time basis until September 2024. He earned his certification as a sommelier in July 2024 and as of October 2024, is the Chief Operating Officer of Global Wines, a Swedish-based alcoholic beverage importer alongside fellow countrymen and former NHL alumni Douglas Murray, who is the CEO of the company.

== International play ==
Stålberg was selected to represent Sweden in the 2012 IIHF World Championship. He also represented Sweden at the 2018 Winter Olympics, where he played in four games and registered one goal en route to Sweden placing 5th.

== Personal life ==
Stålberg's parents are Eddy and Maria Stålberg of Lerum, Sweden. He has two younger brothers, Alexander, and Sebastian, who currently plays hockey for Frölunda HC of the Swedish Hockey League (SHL). His favorite athlete growing up was former Toronto Maple Leafs captain Mats Sundin.

== Career statistics ==
=== Regular season and playoffs ===
			Regular season					Playoffs
Season	Team	League	GP	G	A	Pts	PIM	GP	G	A	Pts	PIM
2003–04	IF Mölndal Hockey	J18	13	14	13	27	—	—	—	—	—	—
2003–04	IF Mölndal Hockey	J18 Allsv	18	25	10	35	—	—	—	—	—	—
2003–04	IF Mölndal Hockey	SWE.4	—	5	7	12	—	—	—	—	—	—
2004–05	IF Mölndal Hockey	J18 Allsv	11	16	7	23	—	—	—	—	—	—
2004–05	IF Mölndal Hockey	SWE.3	29	6	9	15	54	—	—	—	—	—
2005–06	Frölunda HC	J20	41	27	26	53	89	7	6	5	11	6
2006–07	University of Vermont	HE	39	7	8	15	53	—	—	—	—	—
2007–08	University of Vermont	HE	39	10	13	23	34	—	—	—	—	—
2008–09	University of Vermont	HE	39	24	22	46	32	—	—	—	—	—
2008–09	Toronto Marlies	AHL	—	—	—	—	—	2	0	1	1	0
2009–10	Toronto Marlies	AHL	39	12	21	33	36	—	—	—	—	—
2009–10	Toronto Maple Leafs	NHL	40	9	5	14	30	—	—	—	—	—
2010–11	Chicago Blackhawks	NHL	77	12	12	24	43	7	1	0	1	5
2011–12	Chicago Blackhawks	NHL	79	22	21	43	34	6	0	2	2	8
2012–13	Frölunda HC	SEL	11	7	5	12	10	—	—	—	—	—
2012–13	Atlant Moscow Oblast	KHL	14	3	7	10	4	—	—	—	—	—
2012–13	Chicago Blackhawks	NHL	47	9	14	23	25	19	0	3	3	6
2013–14	Nashville Predators	NHL	70	8	10	18	32	—	—	—	—	—
2014–15	Nashville Predators	NHL	25	2	8	10	18	6	1	2	3	0
2014–15	Milwaukee Admirals	AHL	20	11	6	17	14	—	—	—	—	—
2015–16	New York Rangers	NHL	75	9	11	20	22	5	0	0	0	6
2016–17	Carolina Hurricanes	NHL	57	9	3	12	33	—	—	—	—	—
2016–17	Ottawa Senators	NHL	18	2	2	4	8	17	0	2	2	2
2017–18	EV Zug	NL	46	22	28	50	18	5	1	3	4	4
2018–19	EV Zug	NL	10	3	4	7	4	—	—	—	—	—
2018–19	Avangard Omsk	KHL	29	7	4	11	8	18	3	2	5	40
2019–20	HC Fribourg–Gottéron	NL	46	14	17	31	39	—	—	—	—	—
2020–21	HC Fribourg–Gottéron	NL	35	13	16	29	8	5	0	0	0	4
NHL totals			488	82	86	168	245	60	2	9	11	27

=== International ===
Year	Team	Event	Result	GP	G	A	Pts	PIM
2012	Sweden	WC	6th	8	3	1	4	2
2018	Sweden	OG	5th	4	1	0	1	2
Senior totals				12	4	1	5	4

== Awards and honours ==
Award	Year
College
All-Hockey East First Team	2008–09
AHCA East First-Team All-American	2008–09
NHL
Stanley Cup champion	2013
