= Kevin Clark (ice hockey) =

Canadian professional ice hockey forward

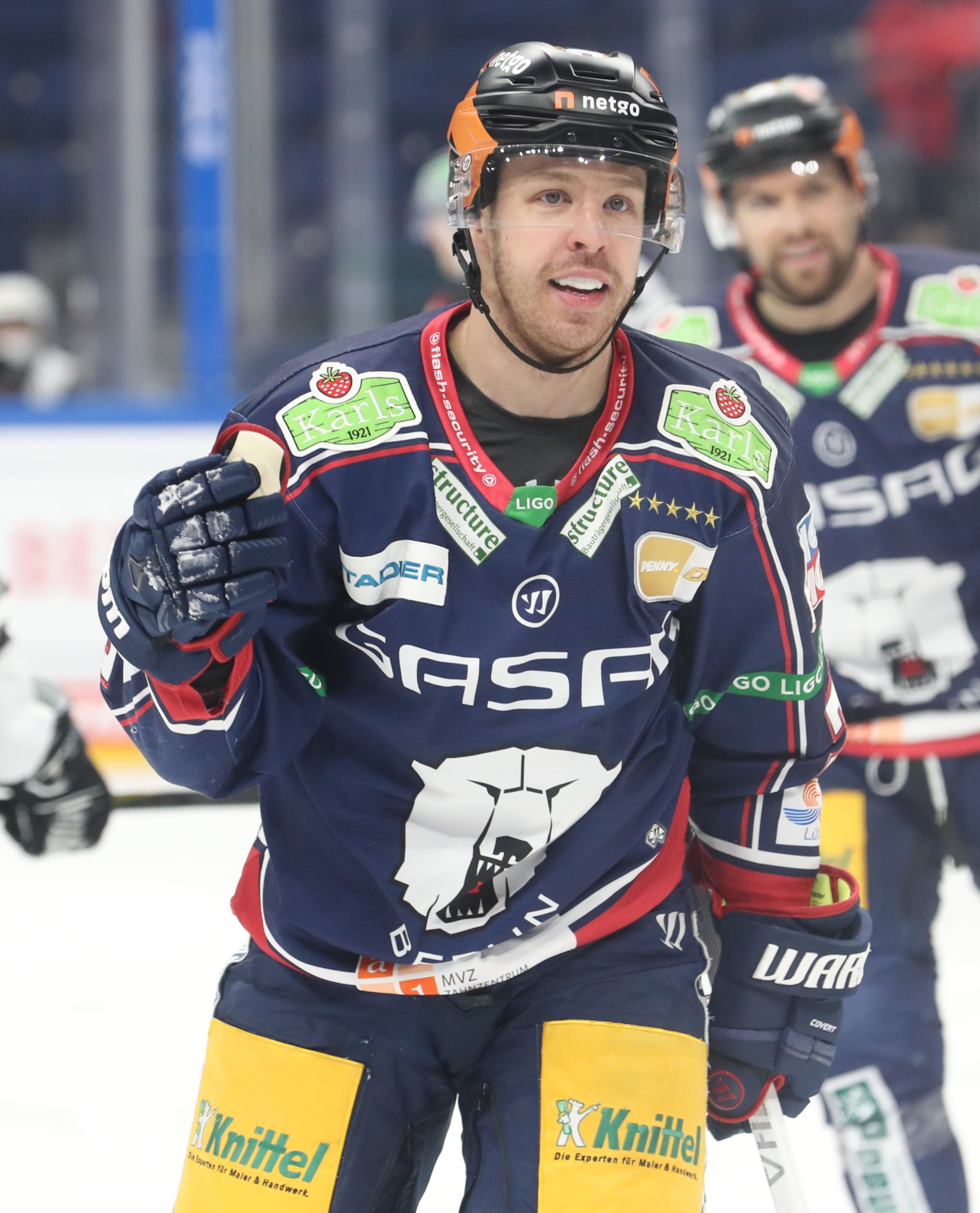
- Born: December 29, 1987 (age 38) Winnipeg, Manitoba, Canada
- Height: 5 ft 9 in (175 cm)
- Weight: 172 lb (78 kg; 12 st 4 lb)
- Position: Right wing
- Shoots: Right
- DEL team Former teams: Düsseldorfer EG; Manitoba Moose; St. John's IceCaps; Krefeld Pinguine; Hamburg Freezers; SCL Tigers; Brynäs IF; Dinamo Riga; SC Rapperswil-Jona Lakers; Eisbären Berlin
- NHL draft: Undrafted
- Playing career: 2010–present

Kevin Clark (born December 29, 1987) is a Canadian professional ice hockey forward. He is currently playing with Düsseldorfer EG of the Deutsche Eishockey Liga (DEL).

== Playing career ==
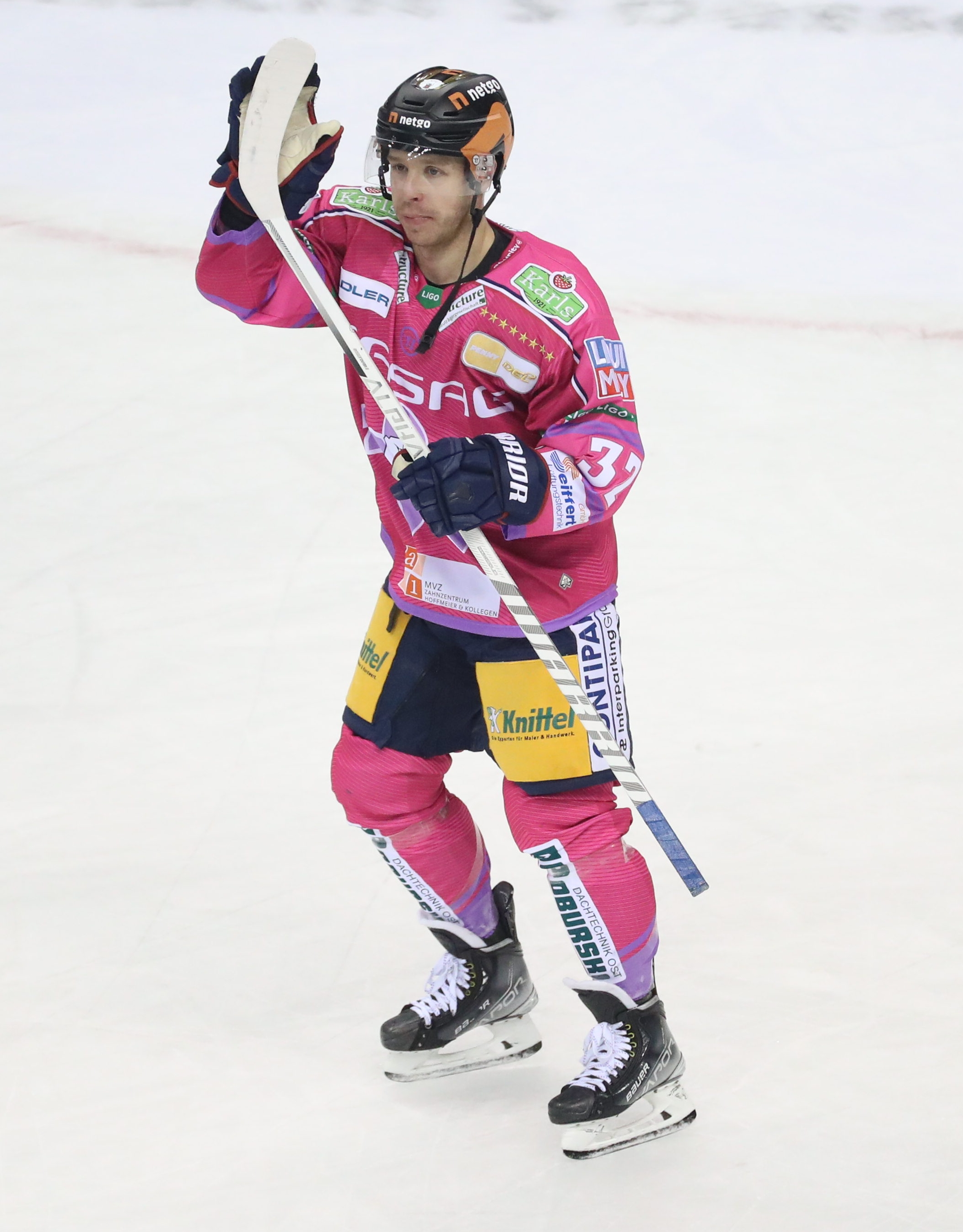
Clark in 2021

Prior to turning professional, Clark attended the University of Alaska Anchorage where he played four seasons with the Alaska Anchorage Seawolves men's ice hockey team, which competes in the NCAA's Division I in the WCHA conference.

Clark turned pro in 2010 and joined the Manitoba Moose of the American Hockey League. In 2011, he joined the AHL St. John’s Ice Caps before signing with Krefeld Pinguine of the German top-flight Deutsche Eishockey Liga (DEL) in February 2013. He finished the 2012-13 campaign with the team and had his contract renewed for the following season, which turned out to be a very successful one: He finished the 2013-14 DEL regular season as the league’s third-leading scorer with 30 goals and 38 assists.

In June 2014, Clark signed with the DEL side Hamburg Freezers, where he continued his scoring prowess, tallying 32 goals and 34 assists in 52 games during the 2014-15 DEL season. He was named DEL Player of the Year and DEL Forward of the Year.

Clark left Germany to sign a one-year contract with the SCL Tigers of the Swiss top-flight National League A on May 6, 2015. Clark made 42 NLA appearances for the Tigers in the 2015-16 regular season, recording 18 goals and 19 assists. In the relegation round, he chipped in with three goals and dealt out eleven assists in twelve games.

On June 5, 2016, he signed with Brynäs IF of the Swedish Hockey League (SHL).

During the 2018–19 season, having appeared in 38 games with Dinamo Riga of the Kontinental Hockey League (KHL), Clark left the club to sign a three-year contract in a return to Switzerland with SC Rapperswil-Jona Lakers on January 3, 2019.

Following two seasons with Eisbären Berlin, Clark left at the conclusion of his contract to continue his tenure in the DEL with Düsseldorfer EG for the 2023–24 season on April 22, 2023.

== International play ==
Medal record

Ice hockey

Representing Canada

Spengler Cup
Gold medal – first place	2015 Davos	
Gold medal – first place	2019 Davos	

In December 2015, Clark helped Team Canada win the Spengler Cup.

== Career statistics ==
			Regular season					Playoffs
Season	Team	League	GP	G	A	Pts	PIM	GP	G	A	Pts	PIM
2003–04	Winnipeg South Blues	MJHL	58	21	32	53	63	—	—	—	—	—
2004–05	Winnipeg South Blues	MJHL	60	30	34	64	153	—	—	—	—	—
2005–06	Winnipeg South Blues	MJHL	50	40	36	76	250	—	—	—	—	—
2006–07	University of Alaska Anchorage	WCHA	35	8	9	17	102	—	—	—	—	—
2007–08	University of Alaska Anchorage	WCHA	36	7	16	23	53	—	—	—	—	—
2008–09	University of Alaska Anchorage	WCHA	34	13	18	31	81	—	—	—	—	—
2009–10	University of Alaska Anchorage	WCHA	36	23	14	37	89	—	—	—	—	—
2009–10	Manitoba Moose	AHL	9	2	1	3	6	4	1	1	2	0
2010–11	Manitoba Moose	AHL	43	6	8	14	22	11	3	3	6	10
2011–12	St. John's IceCaps	AHL	72	12	19	31	54	4	0	0	0	8
2012–13	St. John's IceCaps	AHL	36	6	2	8	35	—	—	—	—	—
2012–13	Krefeld Pinguine	DEL	9	2	2	4	4	9	5	2	7	30
2013–14	Krefeld Pinguine	DEL	51	30	38	68	118	3	3	2	5	0
2014–15	Hamburg Freezers	DEL	52	32	34	66	78	7	1	3	4	4
2015–16	SCL Tigers	NLA	42	18	19	37	53	—	—	—	—	—
2016–17	Brynäs IF	SHL	52	23	16	39	22	20	9	8	17	10
2017–18	Brynäs IF	SHL	49	17	16	33	46	7	3	1	4	2
2018–19	Dinamo Rīga	KHL	38	9	4	13	26	—	—	—	—	—
2018–19	SC Rapperswil–Jona Lakers	NL	19	6	11	17	20	—	—	—	—	—
2019–20	SC Rapperswil–Jona Lakers	NL	48	23	21	44	34	—	—	—	—	—
2020–21	SC Rapperswil–Jona Lakers	NL	50	23	17	40	50	11	5	1	6	24
2021–22	Eisbären Berlin	DEL	49	13	20	33	44	8	2	4	6	10
2022–23	Eisbären Berlin	DEL	56	20	17	37	42	—	—	—	—	—
2023–24	Düsseldorfer EG	DEL	49	13	8	21	36	—	—	—	—	—
AHL totals			160	26	30	56	117	19	4	4	8	18
DEL totals			266	110	119	229	322	27	11	11	22	44
SHL totals			101	40	32	72	68	27	12	9	21	12

== Awards and honours ==
Award	Year
College
WCHA All-Academic Team	2008–09
WCHA All-Academic Team	2009–10
DEL
Player of the Year	2015
Forward of the Year	2015
Champions (Eisbären Berlin)	2022
