= Zachary Fucale =

Canadian ice hockey player (born 1995)

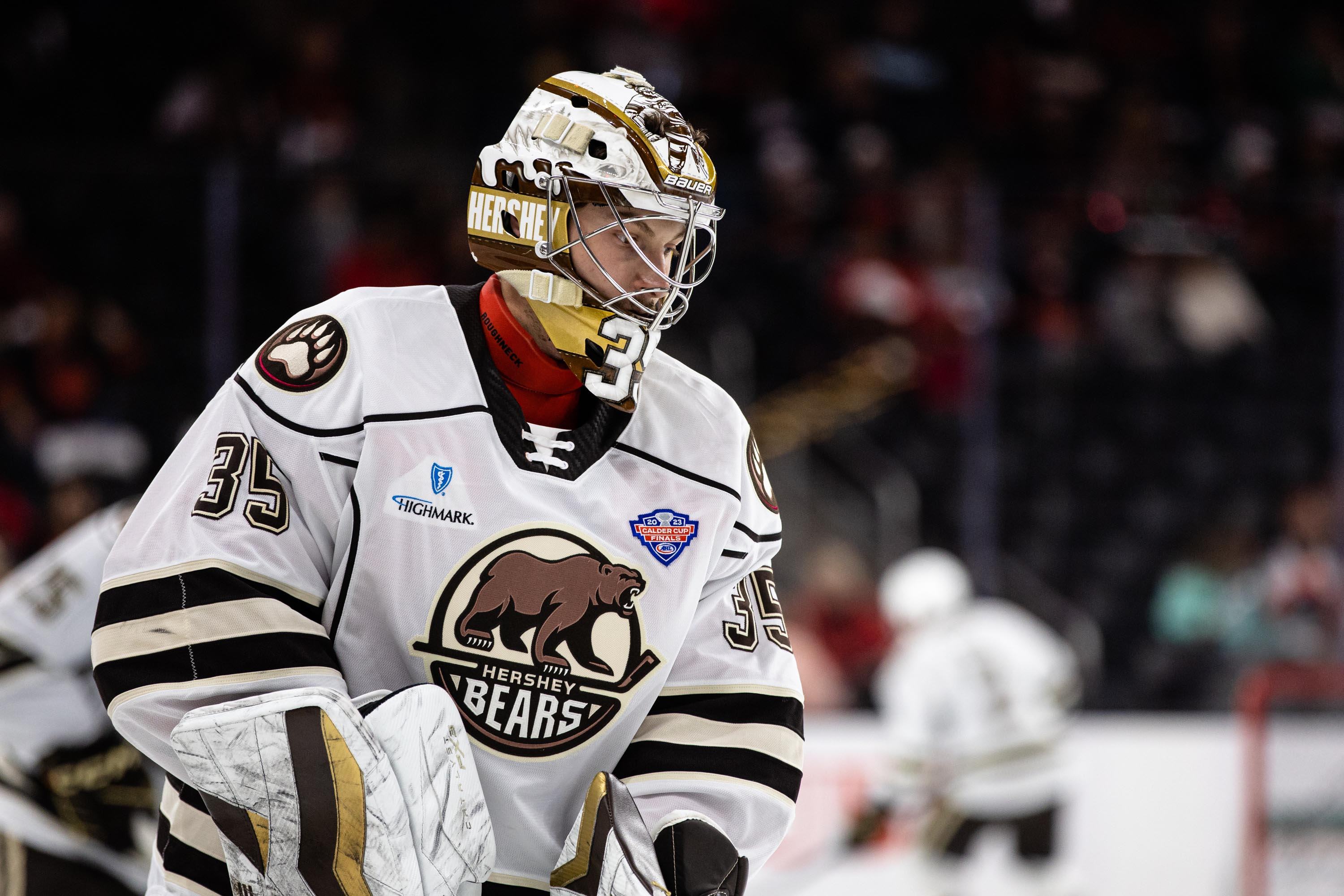
- Fucale with the Hershey Bears in 2023
- Born: May 28, 1995 (age 31) Laval, Quebec, Canada
- Height: 6 ft 1 in (185 cm)
- Weight: 187 lb (85 kg; 13 st 5 lb)
- Position: Goaltender
- Catches: Left
- KHL team Former teams: Dinamo Minsk; Washington Capitals; Traktor Chelyabinsk
- NHL draft: 36th overall, 2013; Montreal Canadiens
- Playing career: 2015–present

Zachary Fucale (born May 28, 1995) is a Canadian professional ice hockey goaltender for HC Dinamo Minsk of the Kontinental Hockey League (KHL). He was selected in the second round, 36th overall, by the Montreal Canadiens in the 2013 NHL entry draft. He has previously played for the Washington Capitals in the National Hockey League (NHL).

== Playing career ==
=== Junior ===
Fucale was born in Laval, Quebec, but grew up in Rosemère, Quebec.

Before being drafted into major junior hockey, Fucale played for the Saint-Eustache Vikings of the Quebec AAA Midget Hockey League. The Halifax Mooseheads selected Fucale eleventh overall in the 2011 Quebec Major Junior Hockey League (QMJHL) Entry Draft.

In his first season with the Mooseheads, Fucale set a QMJHL record for most wins by a rookie with 32. For his performance, he was named to the QMJHL all-rookie team and awarded the Raymond Lagacé Trophy as defensive rookie of the year.

In 2012, Fucale was named to the Subway Super Series as a QMJHL representative. On November 8, 2012, Fucale made the start for team QMJHL in the series and stopped all 10 shots he faced before being replaced halfway through the game. In November 2012, Fucale was named the #1 North American Goaltender in the NHL Central Scouting rankings for the upcoming 2013 NHL Draft.

The 2012–2013 campaign saw Fucale become the Mooseheads' all-time leader in wins with 79, surpassing the mark previously held by Jean-Sébastien Giguère. During the 2012–13 playoffs, he maintained a goals-against average (GAA) of 2.02 and a save percentage of 0.918, recording 16 wins with the Mooseheads against only one loss as they captured their first President's Cup (QMJHL).

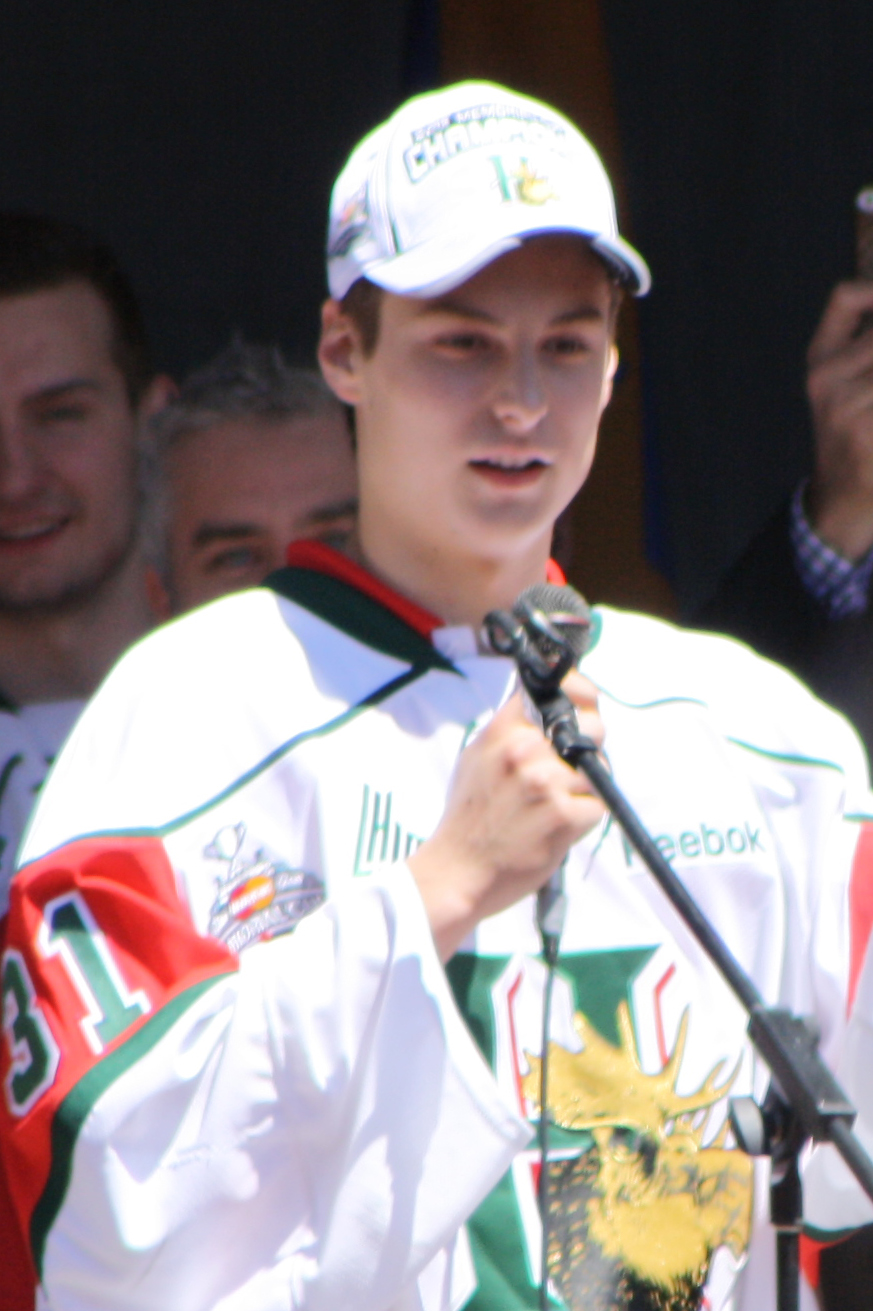
Fucale with the Halifax Mooseheads in 2013

In the 2013 MasterCard Memorial Cup tournament held at Saskatoon, Saskatchewan, Fucale maintained a 0.902 save percentage while maintaining a 3.52 GAA to help the Halifax Mooseheads capture their first-ever Memorial Cup. Playing with a talented Mooseheads club that included future NHL rookie of the year Nathan MacKinnon and Canadian Hockey League player of the year Jonathan Drouin, Fucale turned aside 40 shots to beat the Portland Winterhawks 6–4 in the championship game. He was named to the tournament all-star team.

On January 21, 2014, Fucale became the youngest goalie to reach 100 wins in QMJHL history, at 18 years, 7.8 months. At the same time he set a new record for achieving that mark in the fewest games, winning his hundredth game in 145 starts. The record was previously held by Jacques Cloutier of the Trois-Rivières Draveurs who was 19 when he reached 100 wins in 150 games in 1979.

On November 28, 2014, Fucale recorded his 124th regular season win, passing Olivier Roy for second place among QMJHL goaltenders for most career wins and putting him within 18 wins of Cloutier's all-time record.

Fucale was traded to the Quebec Remparts on December 19, 2014. On his departure from Halifax, he was the club's all-time leader in regular season wins (126), playoff wins (35), and shutouts (15). In an unusual step for an active player, Fucale returned to his former club 22 days after he was traded to be honoured with an emotional eight-minute pre-game tribute.

In May 2015, Fucale led the Quebec Remparts to the President Cup finals after defeating the Cape Breton Screaming Eagles, Charlottetown Islanders, and Moncton Wildcats. The team lost to the Rimouski Océanic in double overtime of the seventh and final game of the series. Fucale was still able to make a return to the national MasterCard Memorial Cup championship, by virtue of Quebec's status as host; however, the team was eliminated by the Western Hockey League's Kelowna Rockets, 9–3, in the semi-final.

=== Professional ===
During the 2013 NHL entry draft, Fucale was the top goalie taken, selected 36th overall by the Montreal Canadiens. Following training camp in 2014, the Canadiens returned Fucale to the Halifax Mooseheads for his final junior year. In 2015, Fucale played his first pre-season game in a Habs uniform, giving up two goals, including the overtime winner, in a 2–1 loss to the Toronto Maple Leafs on September 22.

On September 26, 2015, the Canadiens announced that Fucale was being reassigned for the 2015–16 season to the St. John's IceCaps of the American Hockey League, where he shared netminder duties with Dustin Tokarski. On November 30, the team recalled Fucale from the AHL to become Mike Condon's back-up goalie during Carey Price's recovery from an injury.

During the 2016–17 season, Fucale played for the Brampton Beast (ECHL). Entering the playoffs, he had already established a number of franchise records including games played, wins (25) and goals against average. He also took time out in December to lead Canada to a Spengler Cup Champion as the team's only ECHL representative and the youngest player on the roster.

On July 1, 2018, after he was not tendered a qualifying offer to remain with the Canadiens, Fucale signed as a free agent to a one-year, two-way deal with the Vegas Golden Knights. After attending the Golden Knights and Wolves training camp, Fucale was assigned for the majority of the 2018–19 season to ECHL affiliate, the Fort Wayne Komets. Collecting 20 wins in 34 regular season games, Fucale also made 5 appearances with the Chicago Wolves in the AHL. On June 25, 2019, Fucale was not tendered a qualifying offer with the Golden Knights, releasing him to free agency.

On July 2, 2019, Fucale agreed to a one-year AHL contract with the Syracuse Crunch, affiliate to the Tampa Bay Lightning. Signed to add depth to the Crunch, Fucale played primarily with ECHL affiliate club the Orlando Solar Bears. After 24 games with the Solar Bears and a single appearance with the Crunch, Fucale was released from his contract midway into the 2019–20 season, in order to sign a contract with his first European club, EHC Red Bull München of the DEL on February 18, 2020. Due to injury, Fucale failed to feature in the DEL before the cancellation of the season due to the COVID-19 pandemic.

On August 19, 2020, the Washington Capitals signed Fucale as a free agent to a one-year, two-way contract worth $700,000.

Fucale made his NHL debut on November 11, 2021, registering a 21-save shutout. In doing so he became the first goalie in Washington Capitals history to register a shutout in his NHL debut, and the first NHL goalie to do so since Garret Sparks. In his second NHL game, on January 8, 2022, he did not surrender a goal until late in the third period, setting a new NHL record for the longest shutout streak to begin a career.

On June 21, 2023, Fucale won the Calder Cup with the Capitals' AHL affiliate, the Hershey Bears, defeating the Coachella Valley Firebirds in 7 games. The final game ended in overtime 3–2 with the game-winning goal scored by Mike Vecchione. This was the Bears' first Calder Cup since the 2009–10 season.

As a free agent from the Capitals in the off-season, Fucale opted to halt his career in North America and signed a two-year contract with Russian club, Traktor Chelyabinsk of the KHL, on July 6, 2023. He led Traktor to the Gagarin Cup semifinals in the 2024 playoffs and the Gagarin Cup Finals in 2025, both runs ended with defeats by Lokomotiv Yaroslavl. Fucale also led the KHL in shutouts in the 2024/25 regular season, and was invited to the 2025 KHL All-Star Game.

After Fucale's contract with Traktor expired, he signed as a free agent to a two-year deal with Belarusian club, HC Dinamo Minsk.

== International play ==
Medal record

Representing Canada

Ice hockey

Ivan Hlinka Memorial Tournament
Gold medal – first place	2012 Piešťany	

IIHF World U20 Championship
Gold medal – first place	2015 Canada	

Spengler Cup
Gold medal – first place	2016 Davos	
Gold medal – first place	2019 Davos	

Fucale won gold at the 2012 Ivan Hlinka U18 Memorial Tournament as a member of Team Canada. Fucale played in four of the five tournament games, shutting out Finland 4–0 in the gold medal game.

Fucale was named to Canada's roster for the 2014 and 2015 World Junior Championship. After Canada finished a disappointing fourth at the 2014 event in Sweden, Fucale led Team Canada to a gold medal, their first in five years, at the 2015 IIHF World Junior Championship. In so doing, Fucale improved his save percentage to .949 over five games in 2015, up from .902 in the previous tournament; his goals-against average improved to 1.20 from 2.42. With eight wins, Fucale ties Stéphane Fiset (1989/1990) and Marc-André Fleury (2003/2004) for most wins by a Canadian goaltender at the IIHF U20 tournament.

Fucale has represented Canada three times at the annual invitational Spengler Cup tournament, leading Team Canada to gold medals in 2016 and 2019 and to a silver medal in 2018. In the 2019 tournament, Fucale was named to the tournament all star team after allowing only one goal in three starts, recording two shutouts and a 0.33 goals-against average.

== Career statistics ==
=== Regular season and playoffs ===
			Regular season									Playoffs
Season	Team	League	GP	W	L	OT	MIN	GA	SO	GAA	SV%	GP	W	L	MIN	GA	SO	GAA	SV%
2010–11	Saint-Eustache Vikings	QMAAA	28	—	—	—	—	—	—	3.09	.901	10	—	—	—	—	—	3.61	.901
2011–12	Halifax Mooseheads	QMJHL	58	32	18	6	3249	171	2	3.16	.892	17	10	7	1022	49	0	2.88	.904
2012–13	Halifax Mooseheads	QMJHL	55	45	5	3	3162	124	2	2.35	.909	17	16	1	1042	35	3	2.02	.918
2013–14	Halifax Mooseheads	QMJHL	50	36	9	3	2917	110	6	2.26	.907	15	9	4	797	37	0	2.79	.882
2014–15	Halifax Mooseheads	QMJHL	24	13	9	2	1426	76	2	3.20	.890	—	—	—	—	—	—	—	—
2014–15	Quebec Remparts	QMJHL	17	8	8	0	933	50	1	3.22	.877	20	14	6	1194	51	1	2.56	.913
2015–16	St. John's IceCaps	AHL	42	16	19	4	2376	124	1	3.13	.903	—	—	—	—	—	—	—	—
2016–17	St. John's IceCaps	AHL	3	1	2	0	178	7	1	2.36	.919	—	—	—	—	—	—	—	—
2016–17	Brampton Beast	ECHL	46	25	12	2	2359	134	4	3.17	.898	11	6	5	704	25	0	2.13	.932
2017–18	Laval Rocket	AHL	18	10	7	0	993	54	0	3.26	.890	—	—	—	—	—	—	—	—
2017–18	Brampton Beast	ECHL	11	5	4	2	657	31	0	2.83	.913	—	—	—	—	—	—	—	—
2018–19	Fort Wayne Komets	ECHL	34	20	9	1	1983	105	0	3.18	.894	6	2	4	371	20	0	3.23	.910
2018–19	Chicago Wolves	AHL	5	1	3	0	262	11	0	2.51	.909	—	—	—	—	—	—	—	—
2019–20	Orlando Solar Bears	ECHL	24	10	8	4	1322	52	4	2.36	.928	—	—	—	—	—	—	—	—
2019–20	Syracuse Crunch	AHL	1	0	1	0	56	3	0	3.20	.800	—	—	—	—	—	—	—	—
2020–21	South Carolina Stingrays	ECHL	1	1	0	0	60	1	0	1.00	.972	—	—	—	—	—	—	—	—
2020–21	Hershey Bears	AHL	11	9	2	0	666	20	1	1.80	.932	—	—	—	—	—	—	—	—
2021–22	Hershey Bears	AHL	31	11	15	5	1852	81	3	2.62	.896	—	—	—	—	—	—	—	—
2021–22	Washington Capitals	NHL	4	1	1	1	172	5	1	1.75	.924	—	—	—	—	—	—	—	—
2022–23	Hershey Bears	AHL	38	21	11	4	2197	93	2	2.54	.902	2	0	0	41	0	0	0.00	1.000
2023–24	Traktor Chelyabinsk	KHL	46	24	17	4	2643	95	6	2.16	.929	11	8	2	645	27	0	2.51	.933
2024–25	Traktor Chelyabinsk	KHL	49	28	16	4	2907	104	9	2.15	.921	21	12	7	1187	51	0	2.58	.918
2025–26	Dinamo Minsk	KHL	43	22	12	7	2481	98	5	2.37	.909	7	4	3	439	13	0	1.78	.933
NHL totals			4	1	1	1	172	5	1	1.75	.924	—	—	—	—	—	—	—	—
KHL totals			138	74	45	15	8,031	297	20	2.22	.920	39	24	12	2,272	91	0	2.40	.925

=== International ===
Year	Team	Event	Result	GP	W	L	OTL	SOL	MIN	GA	SO	GAA	SV%
2012	Canada Quebec	U17	6th	5	2	1	0	0	185	10	0	3.25	.906
2012	Canada	IH18	1st place, gold medalist(s)	4	4	0	0	0	—	8	1	2.00	.927
2014	Canada	WJC	4th	5	3	2	0	0	298	12	0	2.42	.902
2015	Canada	WJC	1st place, gold medalist(s)	5	5	0	0	0	300	6	2	1.20	.939
2016	Canada	SC	1st place, gold medalist(s)	4	3	1	0	0	—	14	0	2.00	.934
2018	Canada	SC	2nd place, silver medalist(s)	4	3	0	0	1	—	7	0	1.71	.920
2019	Canada	SC	1st place, gold medalist(s)	4	4	0	0	0	—	2	2	0.33	.979
International totals				31	24	4	0	1	—	59	5	1.84	.932

== Awards and honours ==
Award	Year
QMJHL
Raymond Lagacé Trophy – QMJHL Defensive Rookie of the Year	2011–12
QMJHL First Team All-Star	2012–13
QMJHL President's Cup Championship	2013
Paul Dumont Trophy – Personality of the Year	2013–14
Jacques Plante Memorial Trophy – Best GAA	2013–14
CHL
Memorial Cup Championship	2013
Memorial Cup All-Star Team	2013
AHL
Harry "Hap" Holmes Memorial Award	2020–21
Calder Cup	2023
International
2012 Ivan Hlinka U18 Memorial Tournament – Gold Medal	2012
IIHF World U20 Championships – Gold Medal	2015
Spengler Cup – All-Star Team	2019
KHL
KHL All-Star Game	2025
