= Kris Versteeg =

Canadian ice hockey player (born 1986)

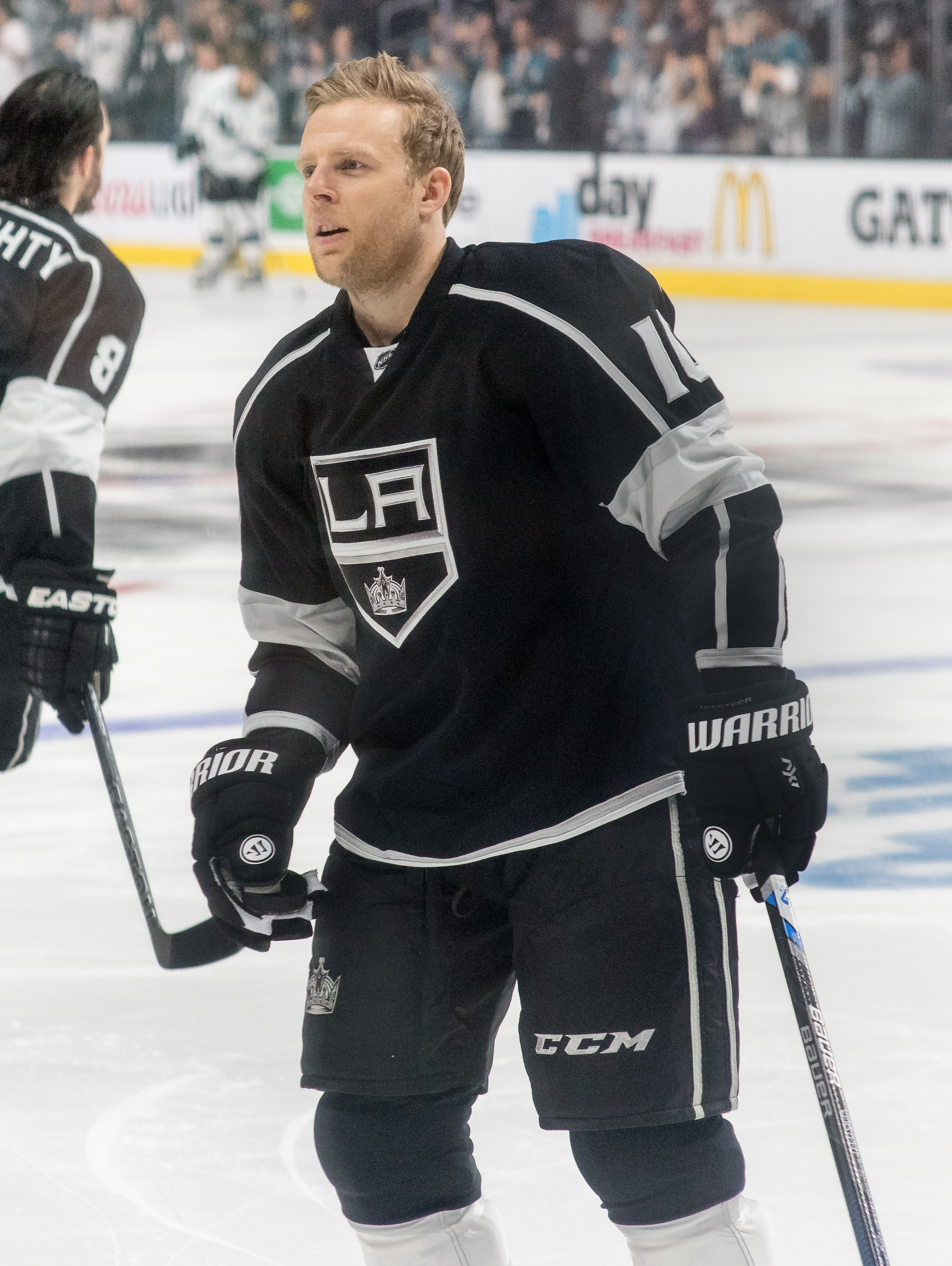
- Versteeg with the Los Angeles Kings in April 2016
- Born: May 13, 1986 (age 40) Lethbridge, Alberta, Canada
- Height: 5 ft 11 in (180 cm)
- Weight: 176 lb (80 kg; 12 st 8 lb)
- Position: Right wing
- Shot: Right
- Played for: Chicago Blackhawks; Toronto Maple Leafs; Philadelphia Flyers; Florida Panthers; Carolina Hurricanes; Los Angeles Kings; Calgary Flames; Avangard Omsk; Växjö Lakers; Nitra
- NHL draft: 134th overall, 2004; Boston Bruins
- Playing career: 2006–2020

Kristopher Royce Versteeg (born May 13, 1986) is a Canadian entrepreneur and former professional ice hockey winger. During his career, he played for the Chicago Blackhawks, Toronto Maple Leafs, Philadelphia Flyers, Florida Panthers, Carolina Hurricanes, Los Angeles Kings, Calgary Flames, Avangard Omsk, Växjö Lakers and Nitra. Versteeg is a two-time Stanley Cup champion with the Chicago Blackhawks in 2010 and 2015.

Originally selected 134th overall in the 2004 NHL entry draft by the Boston Bruins, he played with the club's minor league affiliate, the Providence Bruins of the American Hockey League (AHL), for parts of two seasons before being traded to the Blackhawks. Versteeg continued playing in the AHL with the Blackhawks' affiliates until making his NHL debut during the 2007–08 season. The following campaign, he received a nomination for the Calder Memorial Trophy as the NHL's best rookie. In his second full season with the Blackhawks, he helped the club win the Stanley Cup in 2010. Following Chicago's Cup win, Versteeg played for the Toronto Maple Leafs, Philadelphia Flyers and Florida Panthers before being traded back to Chicago during the 2013–14 season, winning the Stanley Cup again in 2015.

== Playing career ==
=== Early career and Boston Bruins ===
Versteeg was drafted 134th overall in the 2004 NHL entry draft by the Boston Bruins, after a four-year Western Hockey League (WHL) career spanning from 2002–03 to 2005–06 and spent with the Lethbridge Hurricanes, Kamloops Blazers and Red Deer Rebels. During his time with Lethbridge, he played with future Blackhawks teammate Brent Seabrook for three seasons. Versteeg made his professional debut, playing in the final 13 games of the 2005–06 season with Boston's American Hockey League (AHL) affiliate, the Providence Bruins.

=== Chicago Blackhawks ===
Versteeg remained with Providence for the beginning of 2006–07 before being traded by Boston on February 3, 2007, along with a conditional draft pick, to the Chicago Blackhawks for Brandon Bochenski. As a result, he moved within the AHL to Chicago's minor league affiliate, the Norfolk Admirals. Versteeg then played for the Rockford IceHogs in 2007–08, as Chicago switched its AHL affiliation. He made his NHL debut that season as he was called up for a total of 13 games, recording two goals and two assists.

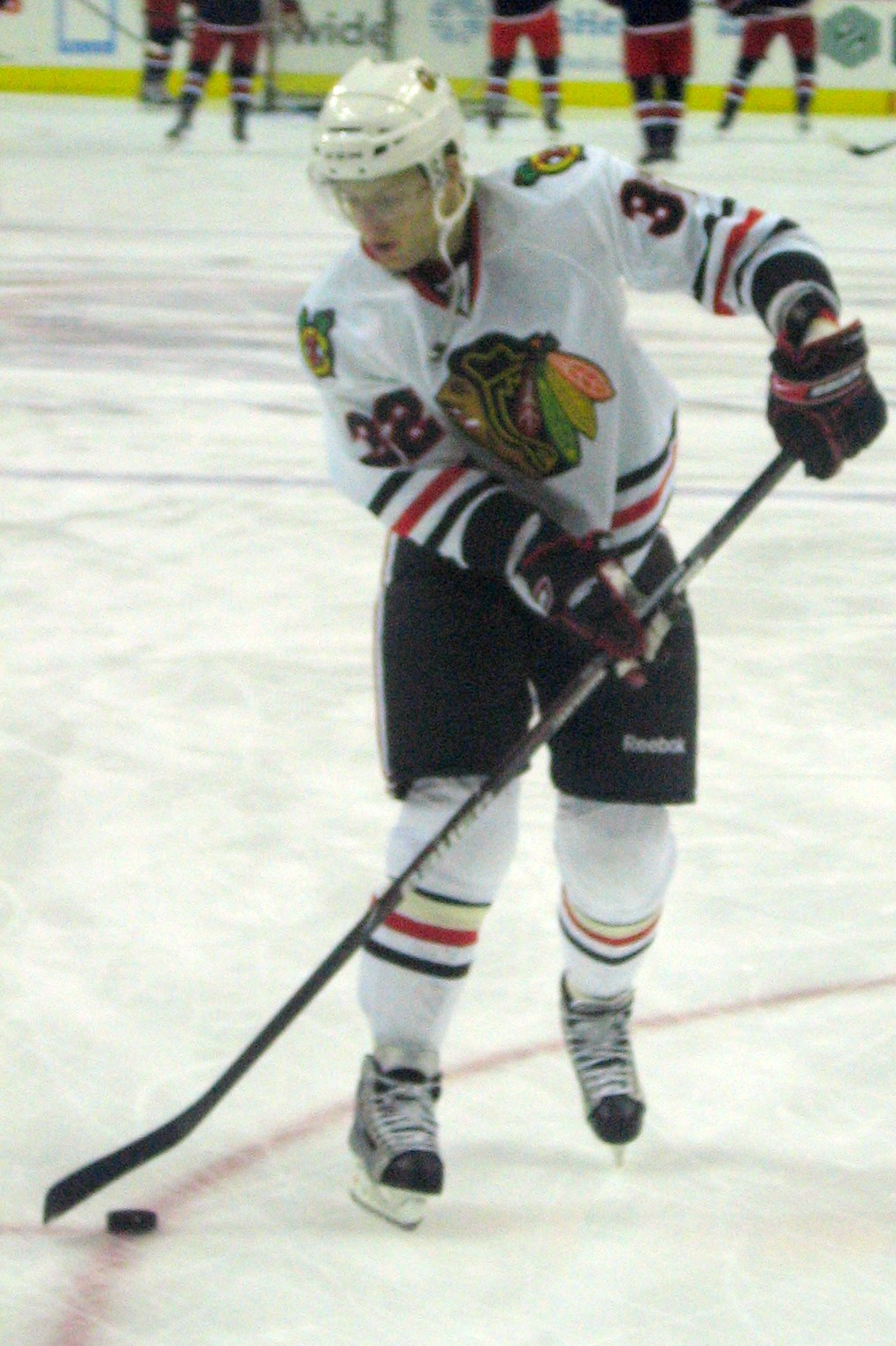
Versteeg in March 2009, in his first stint with the Blackhawks

Versteeg played his first full season with the Blackhawks in 2008–09. On January 1, 2009, he scored the opening goal of the 2009 Winter Classic held at Wrigley Field against the Detroit Red Wings. Finishing the season with 22 goals and 53 points, second in rookie scoring to Bobby Ryan of the Anaheim Ducks, he was nominated for the Calder Memorial Trophy as rookie of the year along with Ryan and goaltender Steve Mason of the Columbus Blue Jackets for his efforts. Mason ended up winning the Calder.

Versteeg's entry-level contract expired after the 2008–09 season, which would typically have made him a restricted free agent (RFA). However, a clerical error in which the Blackhawks failed to tender qualifying offers to their pending RFAs by the league deadline led to speculation Versteeg and several of his teammates would become unrestricted free agents. As a result, the NHL Players' Association (NHLPA) filed a grievance on the players' behalf. Shortly thereafter, on July 8, 2009, he re-signed with the Blackhawks to a three-year contract, worth nearly US$9 million.

Versteeg's offensive production dropped in his second full NHL season, recording 20 goals and 44 points over 79 games. In the 2010 playoffs, he added 14 points in 22 games, helping the Blackhawks to a Stanley Cup championship, defeating the Philadelphia Flyers in the Finals. His name was originally misspelled "Kris Vertseeg" when engraved on the Stanley Cup, but was quickly corrected.

=== Toronto Maple Leafs ===
Due to salary cap restraints, the Blackhawks were forced to trade away several players in the off-season, including Versteeg. On June 30, 2010, he was dealt to the Toronto Maple Leafs along with the rights to prospect Bill Sweatt in exchange for forwards Viktor Stålberg, Chris DiDomenico and Philippe Paradis. He recorded his first Gordie Howe hat trick (a goal, an assist and a fight) with the Maple Leafs in a game against the Ottawa Senators on October 9, 2010; he scored against Pascal Leclaire, assisted on a goal by Phil Kessel and fought Mike Fisher.

=== Philadelphia Flyers ===
After recording 35 points over 53 games with the Maple Leafs in 2010–11, he was traded for the third time in his career on February 14, 2011. Toronto sent him to the Philadelphia Flyers in exchange for first-round and third-round draft picks. Versteeg joined the team that he helped defeat in the previous season's Stanley Cup Final and scored seven goals to go with four assists during the remainder of the regular season. He scored one goal during the 2011 playoffs, which came in the fourth and final game of the Flyers second round series against the Boston Bruins in a 5-1 loss, ending with the Bruins sweeping the Flyers in four games.

=== Florida Panthers ===
On July 1, 2011, the Flyers traded Versteeg to the Florida Panthers for a second-round pick (either 2012 or 2013— Florida's choice) and a third-round pick in the 2012 NHL entry draft. The trade came just a few hours after the Flyers announced the signing of Jaromír Jágr.

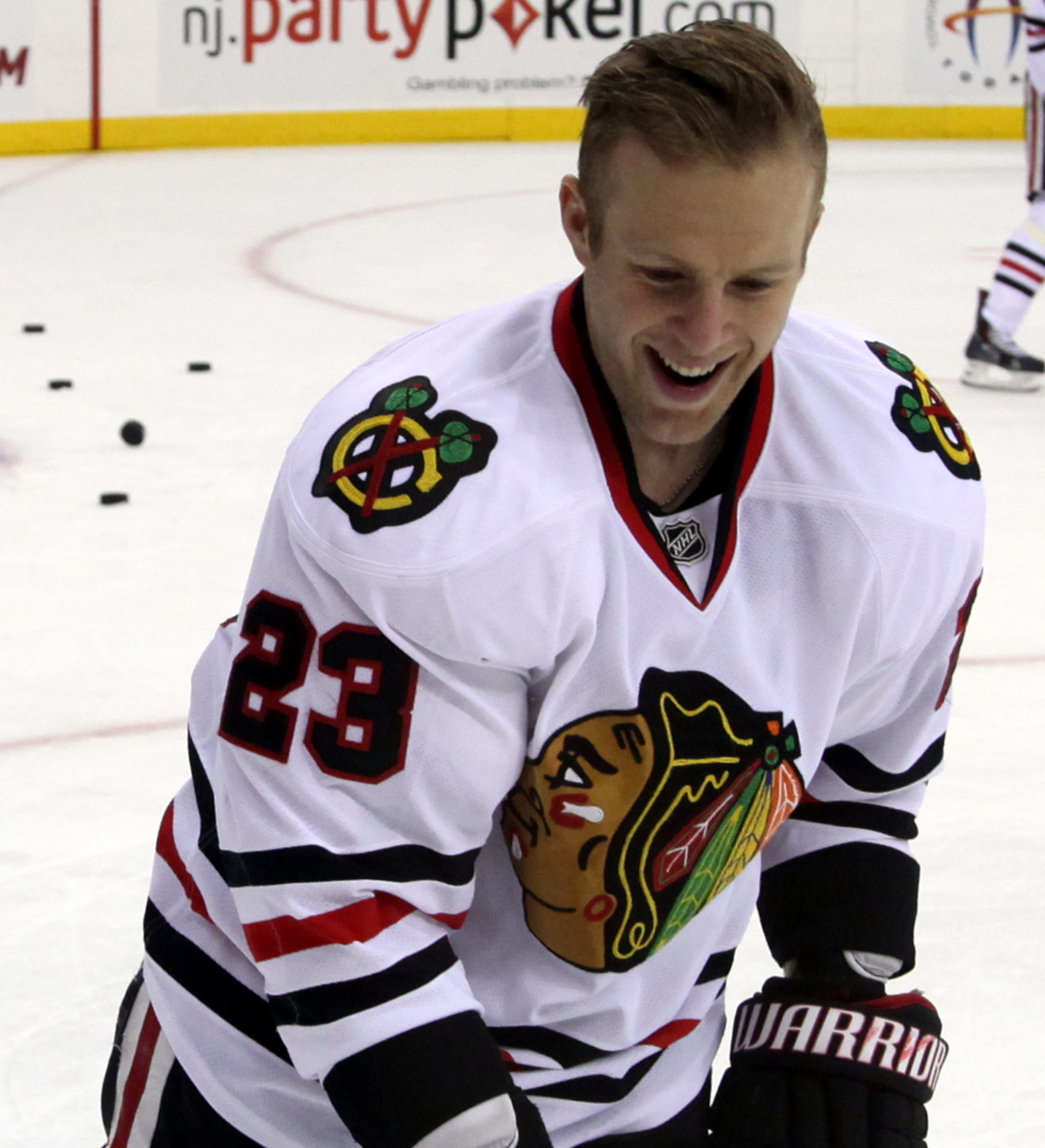
Versteeg during his second stint with the Blackhawks in December 2014

=== Return to Chicago ===
On November 14, 2013, the Panthers traded Versteeg, along with Philippe Lefebvre, to the Chicago Blackhawks for Jimmy Hayes and Dylan Olsen. Since Versteeg's jersey #32, which he wore during his first stint with the club was being worn by defenseman Michal Rozsíval, Versteeg opted to wear #23 upon his return to the club.

On June 15, 2015, Versteeg won his second Stanley Cup with the Chicago Blackhawks in a 2–0 game six victory over the Tampa Bay Lightning in the 2015 Stanley Cup Final.

=== Carolina Hurricanes ===
On September 11, 2015, Versteeg was again traded by the Blackhawks due to salary cap constraints, along with Joakim Nordstrom, to the Carolina Hurricanes along with a third-round pick in the 2017 NHL entry draft for a fifth-round pick in the 2017 NHL entry draft and two prospects. The move was done to make more cap space available for Marcus Kruger, who was re-signed the next day. In the following 2015–16 season, Versteeg transitioned to the Hurricanes quickly and was used on the club's top scoring lines throughout the year.

=== Los Angeles Kings ===
Versteeg produced 33 points in 63 games before on February 28, 2016, he was familiarly traded at the trade deadline to the Los Angeles Kings in exchange for Valentin Zykov and a conditional 5th-round pick in 2016 (if Los Angeles advanced to the 2016 Western Conference Final, failed). Acquired by the Kings for depth in their playoff run, the team would fail to make it deep, losing in the first round to the San Jose Sharks. In his stint with the Kings, Versteeg scored 5 points in 14 games, while adding 2 more in the team's 5 playoff appearances.

=== Calgary Flames ===
On July 25, 2016, as a free agent from the Kings, Versteeg opted to pause his NHL career in agreeing to sign a one-year deal with the SC Bern of the Swiss NLA. However, he later failed to pass the medical exam in early September and therefore the contract was voided. On September 9, 2016, Versteeg returned to continue his career in the NHL in agreeing to join the Edmonton Oilers at their training camp on a professional tryout basis.

After a successful training camp with the Oilers, on October 11, 2016, Versteeg rejected a contract offer from the Oilers, opting to instead join provincial rivals the Calgary Flames on a one-year deal worth $900,000 in the NHL. Versteeg enjoyed a productive first season in Calgary, establishing himself as a key contributor on the powerplay. His eight goals with the man-advantage led the team, while his 15 total goals finished tied for fifth. Versteeg finished second in team scoring during the Flames' round-one series against the Anaheim Ducks, tallying a goal and three assists as the Flames were swept in four games.

With Versteeg and Flames management both interested in coming to terms on a new contract, they agreed to a one-year, $1.75 million contract on June 29, 2017. Versteeg played 24 games for the club after suffering a hip injury on November 24, and having surgery on December 4.

=== Later years ===
On September 1, 2018, Versteeg signed an overseas contract, joining Russian club, Avangard Omsk of the Kontinental Hockey League (KHL). In the 2018–19 season, Versteeg was limited to just 11 games with Omsk, recording 5 points, before opting to leave for the remainder of the season with Swedish club, Växjö Lakers of the SHL on February 7, 2019. Versteeg contributed down the tail end of the regular season with 11 points through 12 games. He continued his scoring pace in the post season for the Lakers with 6 points in 7 games.

At the conclusion of the Lakers' season, Versteeg left the organization to return to North America. On April 22, 2019, Versteeg signed a one-year contract with the Rockford IceHogs of the American Hockey League (AHL) and would be named team captain. He last played for the IceHogs during the 2007–08 season and the team was still affiliated with the Blackhawks. After appearing in just six games through injury, he announced he was leaving the team on November 17, 2019.

With the intention to play out the remainder of the season before retiring, Versteeg signed a contract to join his brother Mitch at HK Nitra of the Tipsport liga on November 20, 2019. He retired from playing on April 14, 2020.

== Beyond playing career ==
=== Business ventures ===
Versteeg and his brothers founded Klevr.ai, a sports technology app that launched in 2021.

=== VersSet Skills Camp ===
Versteeg teamed up with fellow professional hockey player Devin Setoguchi to launch the VersSet Skills Camp, run each summer in Taber, Alberta. The camp brings together hockey players age 4 to 18 for on-ice and off-ice training, conditioning, and skills development. The goal of the camp is to share the love of the game and give back to the future generation of hockey players.

=== Philanthropy ===
Passionate about supporting youth in sport and providing them the tools and opportunities to succeed, Versteeg raised $15,000 for Opokaa’sin Early Intervention Society while competing on Battle of the Blades. Versteeg dedicated his support of the organization to his best friend Colton Yellowhorn and his upbringing near the largest treaty area in Canada, located in southern Alberta. Throughout the COVID-19 pandemic, he also donated funds to struggling families in Southern Alberta to purchase groceries and other essential items.

=== Broadcast ===
Versteeg is a regular contributor on Sportsnet Hockey Central and SiriusXM NHL Radio. He has gained notoriety for his bold opinions and thoughtful critiques on topics ranging from rule enforcement to players' fashion sense.

== Personal life ==
Versteeg was born in Lethbridge, Alberta, to Marilyn and Roy; Versteeg's grandparents Morris and Joanne also played an important role in his upbringing. He is married with three children, and his younger brother Mitch is a former defenceman who played for teams in the minor leagues and in Europe.

Versteeg developed a reputation within the NHL for his habit of singing in public, as evidenced by his recitation of a portion of Fergie's "Glamorous" on Mouthpiece Sports, as well as performing an altered version of LMFAO's "Yes" during the 2010 Chicago Blackhawks' Stanley Cup victory parade, as well as many impromptu performances for fans and media throughout his career.

== Career statistics ==
=== Regular season and playoffs ===
			Regular season					Playoffs
Season	Team	League	GP	G	A	Pts	PIM	GP	G	A	Pts	PIM
2002–03	Lethbridge Hurricanes	WHL	57	8	10	18	32	—	—	—	—	—
2003–04	Lethbridge Hurricanes	WHL	68	16	33	49	85	—	—	—	—	—
2004–05	Lethbridge Hurricanes	WHL	68	22	30	52	68	5	0	1	1	4
2005–06	Kamloops Blazers	WHL	14	6	6	12	24	—	—	—	—	—
2005–06	Red Deer Rebels	WHL	57	10	26	36	103	—	—	—	—	—
2005–06	Providence Bruins	AHL	13	2	4	6	13	3	0	0	0	6
2006–07	Providence Bruins	AHL	43	22	27	49	19	—	—	—	—	—
2006–07	Norfolk Admirals	AHL	27	4	19	23	20	2	0	0	0	2
2007–08	Rockford IceHogs	AHL	56	18	31	49	174	12	6	5	11	6
2007–08	Chicago Blackhawks	NHL	13	2	2	4	6	—	—	—	—	—
2008–09	Chicago Blackhawks	NHL	78	22	31	53	55	17	4	8	12	22
2009–10	Chicago Blackhawks	NHL	79	20	24	44	35	22	6	8	14	14
2010–11	Toronto Maple Leafs	NHL	53	14	21	35	29	—	—	—	—	—
2010–11	Philadelphia Flyers	NHL	27	7	4	11	24	11	1	5	6	12
2011–12	Florida Panthers	NHL	71	23	31	54	49	7	3	2	5	8
2012–13	Florida Panthers	NHL	10	2	2	4	8	—	—	—	—	—
2013–14	Florida Panthers	NHL	18	2	5	7	9	—	—	—	—	—
2013–14	Chicago Blackhawks	NHL	63	10	19	29	27	15	1	2	3	4
2014–15	Chicago Blackhawks	NHL	61	14	20	34	35	12	1	1	2	6
2015–16	Carolina Hurricanes	NHL	63	11	22	33	36	—	—	—	—	—
2015–16	Los Angeles Kings	NHL	14	4	1	5	6	5	1	1	2	0
2016–17	Calgary Flames	NHL	69	15	22	37	46	4	1	3	4	4
2017–18	Calgary Flames	NHL	24	3	5	8	6	—	—	—	—	—
2018–19	Avangard Omsk	KHL	11	3	2	5	0	—	—	—	—	—
2018–19	Växjö Lakers	SHL	12	4	7	11	4	7	4	2	6	4
2019–20	Rockford IceHogs	AHL	6	0	1	1	2	—	—	—	—	—
2019–20	HK Nitra	SVK	3	0	3	3	0	—	—	—	—	—
NHL totals			643	149	209	358	374	93	18	30	48	70

=== International ===
Year	Team	Event	Result	GP	G	A	Pts	PIM
2004	Canada	WJC18	4th	7	0	2	2	4
Junior totals				7	0	2	2	4

== Awards and honours ==
Award	Year
NHL
NHL All-Rookie Team	2009
Stanley Cup (Chicago Blackhawks)	2010, 2015
Spengler Cup (Canada)	2019
