= Milan Doudera =

Czech professional ice hockey player

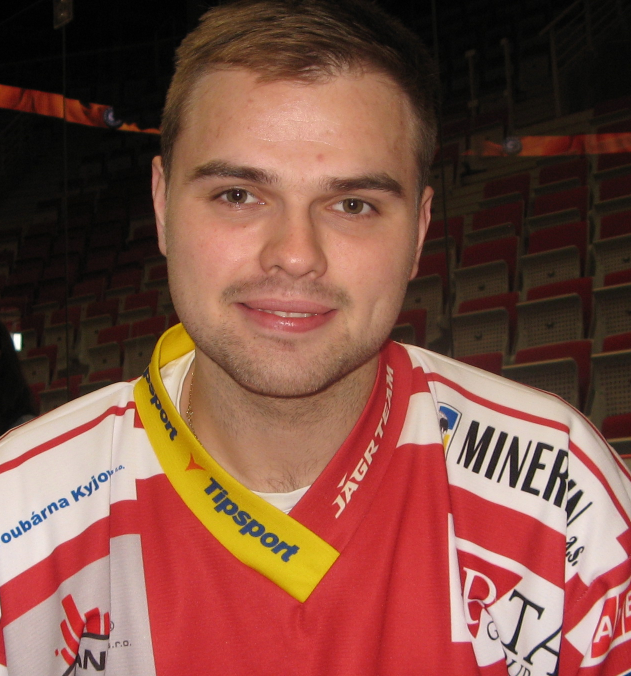
- Born: 1 January 1993 (age 33) Horní Bezděkov, Czech Republic
- Height: 5 ft 11 in (180 cm)
- Weight: 203 lb (92 kg; 14 st 7 lb)
- Position: Defence
- Shoots: Left
- ELH team Former teams: Motor České Budějovice; Rytíři Kladno; HC Oceláři Třinec
- National team: Czech Republic
- NHL draft: Undrafted
- Playing career: 2007–present

Milan Doudera (born 1 January 1993) is a Czech professional ice hockey player. He is currently playing with Motor České Budějovice of the Czech Extraliga (ELH). Doudera made his Czech Extraliga debut playing with Rytíři Kladno before moving to HC Oceláři Třinec during the 2014–15 season. His younger brother Lukáš is an ice hockey player.
