= Chris DiDomenico =

Canadian ice hockey player

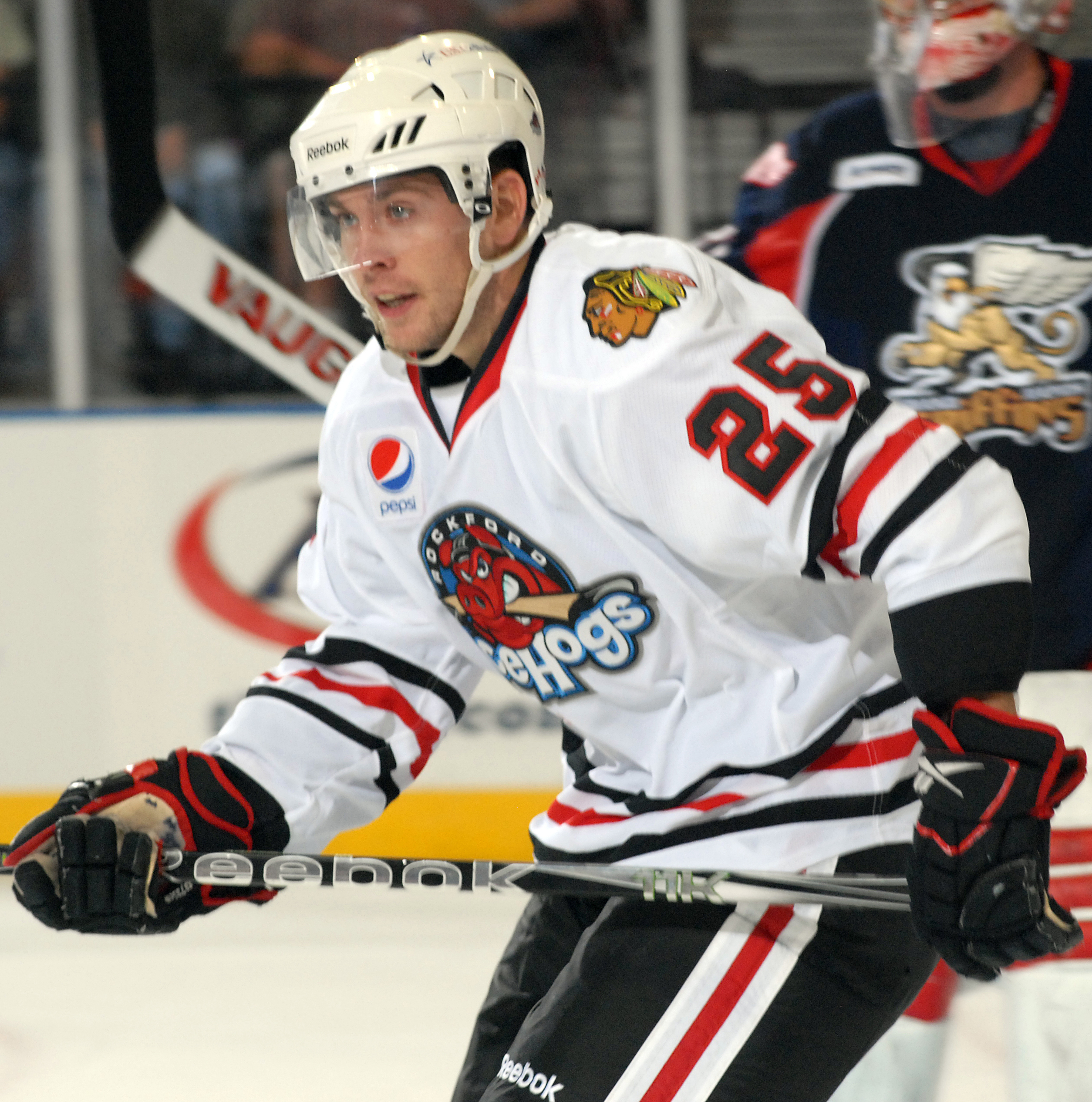
- DiDomenico with the Rockford IceHogs in 2011
- Born: February 20, 1989 (age 37) Woodbridge, Ontario, Canada
- Height: 5 ft 11 in (180 cm)
- Weight: 174 lb (79 kg; 12 st 6 lb)
- Position: Centre
- Shoots: Right
- NL team Former teams: HC Ambrì-Piotta; Asiago HC; SCL Tigers; Ottawa Senators; HC Fribourg-Gottéron; SC Bern
- NHL draft: 164th overall, 2007; Toronto Maple Leafs
- Playing career: 2010–present

Christopher DiDomenico (born February 20, 1989) is a Canadian professional ice hockey forward for HC Ambrì-Piotta of the National League (NL). DiDomenico was selected by the Toronto Maple Leafs in the sixth round (164th overall) of the 2007 NHL entry draft and sporadically played in the National Hockey League with the Ottawa Senators about a decade later.

== Playing career ==
=== Amateur ===
Before turning professional, DiDomenico played major junior hockey in the Quebec Major Junior Hockey League for the Saint John Sea Dogs and the Drummondville Voltigeurs. Nearing the conclusion of the 2008–09 season with the Voltigeurs, DiDomenico was signed to a three-year entry-level contract with his draft team, the Toronto Maple Leafs on March 14, 2009.

=== Professional ===
On June 30, 2010, the Maple Leafs traded DiDomenico, along with Viktor Stålberg and Philippe Paradis, to the Chicago Blackhawks in exchange for Kris Versteeg and Bill Sweatt. After reporting to the Blackhawks 2010 training camp, DiDomenico made his professional debut in the 2010–11 season with American Hockey League affiliate, the Rockford IceHogs.

DiDomenico played two years within the Blackhawks' system, toiling between the AHL and East Coast Hockey League before opting to leave as a restricted free agent in the offseason to join Asiago HC of the Italian Serie A league in 2012. After two years with Asiago, DiDomenico left Italy but remained in Europe after agreeing to join Swiss club, SCL Tigers of the then National League B for their post-season campaign on February 12, 2012.

Helping the Tigers return to the top flight National League A, and in his fourth season with the Tigers in 2016–17, DiDomenico was approached with NHL interest. While leading the Tigers in scoring with 38 points in 48 games, DiDomenico was reluctantly released from his contract with SCL immediately after agreeing to a two-year deal to pursue his NHL ambitions with the Ottawa Senators under former junior coach Guy Boucher on February 27, 2017. In signing with the Senators mid-season, DiDomenico was subject to waivers before joining the club. DiDomenico successfully cleared waivers on February 28, 2017, and joined the Senators. DiDomenico made his NHL debut on March 9, 2017 against the Arizona Coyotes.

In the 2017–18 season, DiDomenico began the year with the Senators AHL affiliate, the Belleville Senators. After 4 games he was recalled and later scored his first NHL goal with Ottawa on October 27, 2017, against the New Jersey Devils with a late game-tying goal. On November 23, 2017, after appearing in 12 games DiDomenico was waived by the Senators, and was then claimed by the Tampa Bay Lightning on November 24. He was immediately assigned on a conditioning loan to the Lightning's AHL affiliate, the Syracuse Crunch. DiDomenico appeared in 3 games for the Crunch, scoring 1 goal.

On December 2, 2017, DiDomenico was claimed off waivers to return to the Senators organization. On February 15, 2018, DiDomenico again left the Senators organization as he was traded to Chicago Blackhawks in exchange for Ville Pokka. He was assigned to the Blackhawks AHL affiliate, Rockford IceHogs, where he quickly transitioned as the club's top offensive player by posting 23 points in 22 games to end the regular season.

After the season, DiDomenico as an impending free agent, opted to recommence his European career by returning to his former Swiss club, SCL Tigers, on an optional three-year contract on June 13, 2018.

During the 2019–20 season, while in his sixth with the SCL Tigers, on January 15, 2020, DiDomenico agreed to a two-year contract commencing from the 2020–21 season to join fellow NL club, HC Fribourg-Gottéron. After the regular season and before the relegation round, the Tigers immediately released DiDomenico.

On October 28, 2024, DiDomenico was part of a rare trade in European hockey, being sent from Fribourg-Gottéron to HC Ambrì-Piotta in exchange for Swedish left winger Jakob Lilja.

== Career statistics ==
=== Regular season and playoffs ===
			Regular season					Playoffs
Season	Team	League	GP	G	A	Pts	PIM	GP	G	A	Pts	PIM
2004–05	North York Rangers	OPJHL	2	0	0	0	0	—	—	—	—	—
2005–06	North York Rangers AAA	GTHL U18	39	15	30	45	20	—	—	—	—	—
2005–06	North York Rangers	OPJHL	2	2	0	2	0	—	—	—	—	—
2006–07	Saint John Sea Dogs	QMJHL	70	25	50	75	60	—	—	—	—	—
2007–08	Saint John Sea Dogs	QMJHL	70	39	56	95	103	14	8	11	19	20
2008–09	Saint John Sea Dogs	QMJHL	26	11	23	34	34	—	—	—	—	—
2008–09	Drummondville Voltigeurs	QMJHL	25	8	17	25	28	15	4	31	35	24
2009–10	Drummondville Voltigeurs	QMJHL	12	7	15	22	10	14	7	14	21	18
2010–11	Rockford IceHogs	AHL	25	0	4	4	6	—	—	—	—	—
2010–11	Toledo Walleye	ECHL	37	9	16	25	31	—	—	—	—	—
2011–12	Rockford IceHogs	AHL	49	2	11	13	24	—	—	—	—	—
2011–12	Toledo Walleye	ECHL	17	4	13	17	14	—	—	—	—	—
2012–13	Asiago HC	ITA	37	22	38	60	82	15	11	31	42	34
2013–14	Asiago HC	ITA	31	24	48	72	50	—	—	—	—	—
2013–14	SCL Tigers	SUI.2	1	0	0	0	0	15	10	12	22	34
2014–15	SCL Tigers	SUI.2	43	25	38	63	75	19	7	28	35	52
2015–16	SCL Tigers	NLA	46	12	26	38	42	—	—	—	—	—
2016–17	SCL Tigers	NLA	48	10	28	38	30	—	—	—	—	—
2016–17	Ottawa Senators	NHL	3	0	0	0	6	—	—	—	—	—
2017–18	Belleville Senators	AHL	25	5	9	14	31	—	—	—	—	—
2017–18	Ottawa Senators	NHL	24	6	4	10	8	—	—	—	—	—
2017–18	Syracuse Crunch	AHL	3	1	0	1	0	—	—	—	—	—
2017–18	Rockford IceHogs	AHL	22	8	15	23	44	13	7	11	18	22
2018–19	SCL Tigers	NL	48	10	36	46	134	7	4	1	5	52
2019–20	SCL Tigers	NL	43	11	28	39	74	—	—	—	—	—
2020–21	HC Fribourg-Gottéron	NL	48	15	31	46	48	5	0	2	2	20
2021–22	HC Fribourg-Gottéron	NL	49	15	39	54	92	9	5	10	15	35
2022–23	SC Bern	NL	46	23	30	53	65	9	2	6	8	38
2023–24	HC Fribourg-Gottéron	NL	52	12	29	41	30	12	4	5	9	10
2024–25	HC Fribourg-Gottéron	NL	16	2	7	9	8	—	—	—	—	—
2024–25	HC Ambrì-Piotta	NL	35	11	29	40	63	4	1	4	5	8
2025–26	HC Ambrì-Piotta	NL	47	10	31	41	42	—	—	—	—	—
NL totals			478	131	314	445	628	46	16	28	44	163
NHL totals			27	6	4	10	14	—	—	—	—	—

Medal record

Ice hockey

Representing Canada

World Junior Championships
Gold medal – first place	2009 Canada	

Spengler Cup
Gold medal – first place	2015 Davos	
Gold medal – first place	2016 Davos	
Gold medal – first place	2019 Davos	

=== International ===
Year	Team	Event	Result	GP	G	A	Pts	PIM
2009	Canada	WJC	1st place, gold medalist(s)	6	2	5	7	4
2014	Canada	SC	4th	2	0	0	0	6
2015	Canada	SC	1st place, gold medalist(s)	4	1	3	4	2
2016	Canada	SC	1st place, gold medalist(s)	5	1	4	5	18
2018	Canada	SC	2nd place, silver medalist(s)	4	1	1	2	4
2019	Canada	SC	1st place, gold medalist(s)	4	1	2	3	2
2022	Canada	SC	5th	3	1	0	1	6
2023	Canada	SC	4th	4	2	3	5	16
2024	Canada	SC	3rd place, bronze medalist(s)	4	2	3	5	16
Junior totals				6	2	5	7	4
Senior totals				30	9	16	25	70

== Awards and honours ==
Award	Year	Ref
QMJHL
All-Rookie Team	2006–07	
Jean Rougeau Trophy	2008-09	
President's Cup Champion	2008-09	
Serie A
Champion	2012-13	
Supercup Champion	2013-14	
NLB
Champion	2014–15	
Promotion to LNA	2014–15	
NL
Media All-Star Team	2021–22	
International
IIHF World U20 Championship gold medal	2009	
Continental Cup Best Forward	2013-14	
Spengler Cup gold medal	2015, 2016, 2019	
