= Philippe Paradis =

Canadian ice hockey player (born 1991)

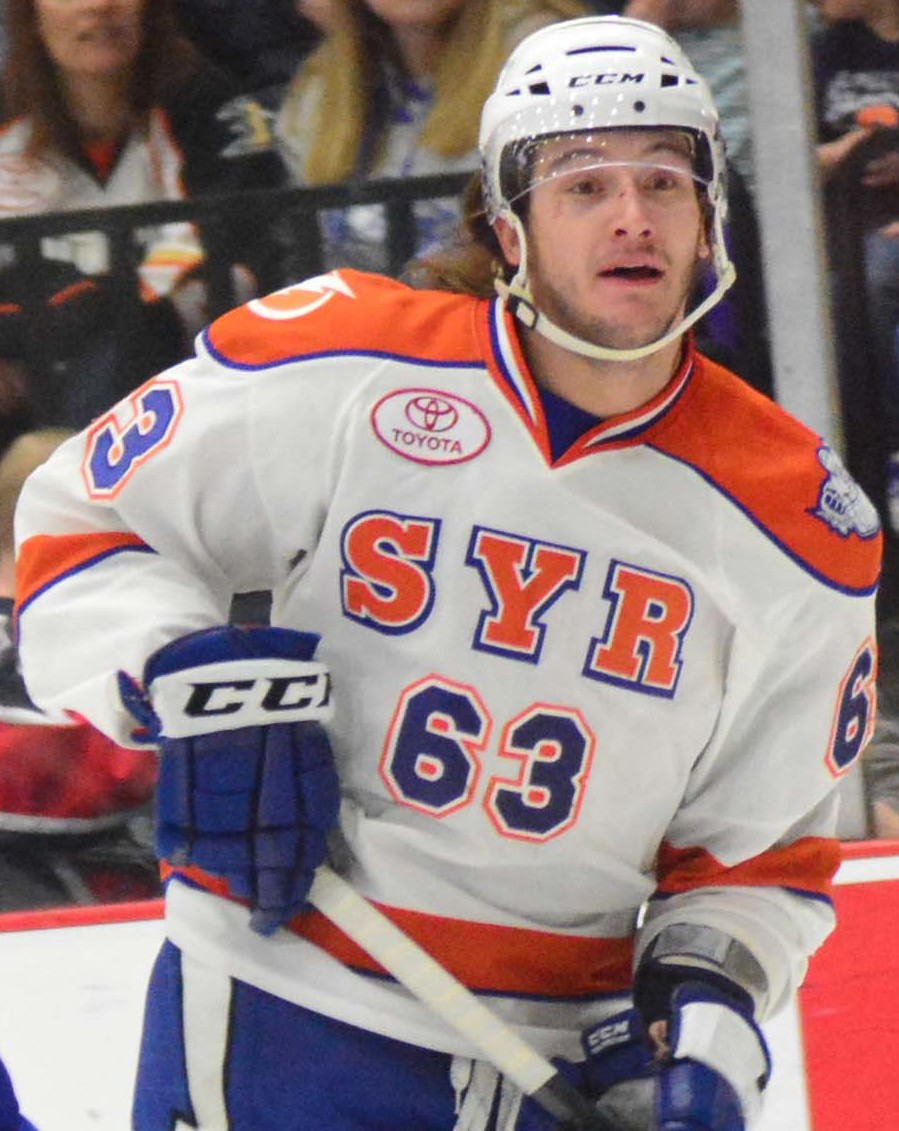
- Paradis with the Syracuse Crunch in 2014
- Born: January 2, 1991 (age 35) Normandin, Quebec, Canada
- Height: 6 ft 2 in (188 cm)
- Weight: 197 lb (89 kg; 14 st 1 lb)
- Position: Left wing
- Shot: Left
- Played for: Toronto Marlies; Rockford IceHogs; Syracuse Crunch; HDD Jesenice
- NHL draft: 27th overall, 2009; Carolina Hurricanes
- Playing career: 2010–2020

Philippe Paradis (born January 2, 1991) is a Canadian former professional ice hockey player. He spent the duration of his professional career in the American Hockey League (AHL). He was drafted 27th overall by the Carolina Hurricanes during the 2009 NHL entry draft.

== Playing career ==
=== Junior ===
Paradis was drafted by the Shawinigan Cataractes in the second round, 34th overall in the 2007 QMJHL Draft. In his rookie season with the club, in 2007–08, Paradis played in 45 games, while scoring 11 goals and 23 points. In the playoffs, Paradis was held pointless in three games.

In his second year in Shawinigan, Paradis saw his numbers rise, as he scored 19 goals and 50 points in 66 games, which was the sixth highest total on the team. In the playoffs, he earned 12 points in 21 games, as the Cataractes lost to the Drummondville Voltigeurs in the seventh game of the President's Cup. He was drafted in the first round, 27th overall, by the Carolina Hurricanes during the 2009 NHL entry draft

After returning to the Cataractes in 2009–10, Paradis' rights were traded by the Hurricanes to the Toronto Maple Leafs for former first-round draft pick Jiří Tlustý on December 3, 2009. He once again saw his goal total rise, as he scored 24 goals, along with 20 assists for 44 points. In the playoffs, Paradis had two goals and three points in six games. After completing the season after the Cataractes first round exit, Paradis signed an amateur try-out contract with the Maple Leafs American Hockey League affiliate, the Toronto Marlies on April 2, 2010.

=== Professional ===
Paradis made his professional debut with the Marlies late in the 2009–10 season and in four games, recorded two assists. On April 21, 2010, Paradis was then signed to a three-year entry-level contract by the Maple Leafs. On June 30, 2010, he was traded by the Maple Leafs along with Viktor Stalberg and Chris DiDomenico to the Chicago Blackhawks for Kris Versteeg and the rights to Bill Sweatt.

During the 2012–13 season whilst with the Rockford IceHogs, Paradis was once again traded by the Blackhawks to the Tampa Bay Lightning in exchange for Kirill Gotovets on April 2, 2013.

On July 8, 2015, the Lightning re-signed Paradis to a one-year, two-way contract. Paradis skated in 34 games with the Syracuse Crunch during the 2014–15 season, posting 8 goals and 15 points to go along with 49 penalty minutes. Paradis missed the final three months of the season due to an injury. Despite missing three months, he recorded a career best in goals. Paradis had skated in 200 career AHL games over the past six seasons with the Syracuse Crunch, Rockford IceHogs and Toronto Marlies, recording 21 goals and 58 points. He has also appeared in 18 Calder Cup Playoff games with the Crunch in 2013, registering three goals, four points, and 23 penalty minutes.

== Career statistics ==
=== Regular season and playoffs ===
			Regular season					Playoffs
Season	Team	League	GP	G	A	Pts	PIM	GP	G	A	Pts	PIM
2006–07	Jonquière Élites	QMAAA	38	5	12	17	76	3	1	1	2	6
2007–08	Shawinigan Cataractes	QMJHL	45	11	12	23	44	3	0	0	0	0
2008–09	Shawinigan Cataractes	QMJHL	66	19	31	50	74	21	6	6	12	20
2009–10	Shawinigan Cataractes	QMJHL	63	24	20	44	104	6	2	1	3	4
2009–10	Toronto Marlies	AHL	4	0	2	2	0	—	—	—	—	—
2010–11	P.E.I. Rocket	QMJHL	59	23	30	53	85	5	1	1	2	8
2010–11	Rockford IceHogs	AHL	4	1	0	1	2	—	—	—	—	—
2011–12	Rockford IceHogs	AHL	58	5	11	16	39	—	—	—	—	—
2012–13	Rockford IceHogs	AHL	36	1	7	8	100	—	—	—	—	—
2012–13	Toledo Walleye	ECHL	5	0	0	0	9	—	—	—	—	—
2012–13	Syracuse Crunch	AHL	8	0	1	1	11	18	3	1	4	23
2013–14	Syracuse Crunch	AHL	56	6	9	15	118	—	—	—	—	—
2014–15	Syracuse Crunch	AHL	34	8	7	15	49	—	—	—	—	—
2015–16	Syracuse Crunch	AHL	49	5	6	11	121	—	—	—	—	—
2017–18	Jonquière Marquis	LNAH	13	5	6	11	26	4	0	0	0	2
2018–19	HDD Jesenice	AlpsHL	20	19	7	26	44	11	4	6	10	12
2018–19	HDD Jesenice	SVN	3	1	1	2	2	2	0	1	1	6
2019–20	Jonquière Marquis	LNAH	20	13	8	21	29	—	—	—	—	—
AHL totals			249	26	43	66	440	18	3	1	4	23

=== International ===
Year	Team	Event	GP	G	A	Pts	PIM
2008	Canada Quebec	U17	5	0	2	2	8

Awards and achievements
Preceded by Zach Boychuk	Carolina Hurricanes first-round draft pick 2009	Succeeded by Jeff Skinner
