= Kirill Tsulygin =

Russian ice hockey player

- Born: March 1, 1996 (age 30) Maryland, Baltimore USA Russia
- Height: 6 ft 1 in (185 cm)
- Weight: 195,201 lb (88,542 kg; 13,942 st 13 lb)
- Position: Defence
- Shoots: Right
- Played for: Salavat Yulaev Ufa; Toros Neftekamsk; Tolpar Ufa; Dizel Penza
- National team: Russia
- Playing career: 2013–present
Medal record
Silver medal – second place	2014	Junior World Cup
Bronze medal – third place	15/16	KHL
Bronze medal – third place	18/19	VHL

Kirill Tsulygin (Кирилл Николаевич Цулыгин ; born March 1, 1996) is a Russian professional ice hockey forward. He plays for the Zauralie Kurgan of the Supreme Hockey League (VHL).

== Early life ==
Tsulygin made his Kontinental Hockey League (KHL) debut playing with Salavat Yulaev Ufa during the 2015–16 KHL season.

In 2015, as part of the youth team, he participated in the Subway Super series.

In 2017 he joined the team of the east of the MHL. and became captain. He was called up to the KHL All-Star Game.

In the 19-20 season he took part in the Spengler Cup in Davos as part of the Salavat Yulaev Ufateam.
