= List of 2010–11 NHL Three Star Awards =

The 2010–11 NHL Three Star Awards are the way the National Hockey League denotes its players of the week and players of the month of the 2010–11 season.

== Weekly ==
Weekly
Week	First Star	Second Star	Third Star
October 17, 2010	Tomas Vokoun (Florida Panthers)	Marian Hossa (Chicago Blackhawks)	Ryan Getzlaf (Anaheim Ducks)
October 24, 2010	Rene Bourque (Calgary Flames)	Jaroslav Halak (St. Louis Blues)	Steven Stamkos (Tampa Bay Lightning)
October 31, 2010	Tim Thomas (Boston Bruins)	Joe Thornton (San Jose Sharks)	Duncan Keith (Chicago Blackhawks)
November 7, 2010	Raffi Torres (Vancouver Canucks)	Mathieu Garon (Columbus Blue Jackets)	Jaroslav Halak (St. Louis Blues)
November 14, 2010	Carey Price (Montreal Canadiens)	Sidney Crosby (Pittsburgh Penguins)	Alexander Semin (Washington Capitals)
November 21, 2010	Rick Nash (Columbus Blue Jackets)	John-Michael Liles (Colorado Avalanche)	Brian Rafalski (Detroit Red Wings)
November 28, 2010	Ondrej Pavelec (Atlanta Thrashers)	Dustin Byfuglien (Atlanta Thrashers)	Sidney Crosby (Pittsburgh Penguins)
December 5, 2010	Sidney Crosby (Pittsburgh Penguins)	Ryan Miller (Buffalo Sabres)	Taylor Hall (Edmonton Oilers)
December 12, 2010	Ryane Clowe (San Jose Sharks)	Marc-Andre Fleury (Pittsburgh Penguins)	Rick Nash (Columbus Blue Jackets)
December 19, 2010	Matt Duchene (Colorado Avalanche)	Tomas Fleischmann (Colorado Avalanche)	Eric Staal (Carolina Hurricanes)
December 26, 2010	Dwayne Roloson (New York Islanders)	Henrik Zetterberg (Detroit Red Wings)	Sidney Crosby (Pittsburgh Penguins)
January 2, 2011	Semyon Varlamov (Washington Capitals)	Shane Doan (Phoenix Coyotes)	Nicklas Lidstrom (Detroit Red Wings)
January 9, 2011	Daniel Sedin (Vancouver Canucks)	Jonas Hiller (Anaheim Ducks)	Jose Theodore (Minnesota Wild)
January 16, 2011	Jussi Jokinen (Carolina Hurricanes)	Patrice Bergeron (Boston Bruins)	Ilya Bryzgalov (Phoenix Coyotes)
January 23, 2011	Tim Thomas (Boston Bruins)	Steven Stamkos (Tampa Bay Lightning)	Martin Brodeur (New Jersey Devils)
January 30, 2011	Eric Staal (Carolina Hurricanes)	Jonathan Quick (Los Angeles Kings)	Michael Grabner (New York Islanders)
February 6, 2011	Johan Franzen (Detroit Red Wings)	Mikael Samuelsson (Vancouver Canucks)	Corey Perry (Anaheim Ducks)
February 13, 2011	Michael Grabner (New York Islanders)	Drew Stafford (Buffalo Sabres)	Ilya Bryzgalov (Phoenix Coyotes)
February 20, 2011	Antti Niemi (San Jose Sharks)	Johan Hedberg (New Jersey Devils)	Ales Hemsky (Edmonton Oilers)
February 27, 2011	Phil Kessel (Toronto Maple Leafs)	Corey Crawford (Chicago Blackhawks)	Matt Calvert (Columbus Blue Jackets)
March 6, 2011	Jarome Iginla (Calgary Flames)	Andrej Sekera (Buffalo Sabres)	Carey Price (Montreal Canadiens)
March 13, 2011	Braden Holtby (Washington Capitals)	Daniel Sedin (Vancouver Canucks)	Corey Perry (Anaheim Ducks)
March 20, 2011	Joe Pavelski (San Jose Sharks)	Ray Emery (Anaheim Ducks)	P. K. Subban (Montreal Canadiens)
March 27, 2011	Ryan Miller (Buffalo Sabres)	Corey Perry (Anaheim Ducks)	Henrik Lundqvist (New York Rangers)
April 3, 2011	Corey Perry (Anaheim Ducks)	Jarome Iginla (Calgary Flames)	Jhonas Enroth (Buffalo Sabres)
April 10, 2011	Thomas Vanek (Buffalo Sabres)	Vincent Lecavalier (Tampa Bay Lightning)	Dan Ellis (Anaheim Ducks)

== Monthly ==
Monthly
Month	First Star	Second Star	Third Star
October	Steven Stamkos (Tampa Bay Lightning)	Tim Thomas (Boston Bruins)	Chris Stewart (Colorado Avalanche)
November	Sidney Crosby (Pittsburgh Penguins)	Carey Price (Montreal Canadiens)	Dustin Byfuglien (Atlanta Thrashers)
December	Sidney Crosby (Pittsburgh Penguins)	Roberto Luongo (Vancouver Canucks)	Nicklas Lidstrom (Detroit Red Wings)
January	Patrice Bergeron (Boston Bruins)	Keith Yandle (Phoenix Coyotes)	Pekka Rinne (Nashville Predators)
February	Jonathan Toews (Chicago Blackhawks)	Antti Niemi (San Jose Sharks)	Johan Hedberg (New Jersey Devils)
March	Corey Perry (Anaheim Ducks)	Daniel Sedin (Vancouver Canucks)	Pekka Rinne (Nashville Predators)

== Rookie of the month ==
Rookie of the Month
Month	Player
October	Michal Neuvirth (Washington Capitals)
November	Sergei Bobrovsky (Philadelphia Flyers)
December	Logan Couture (San Jose Sharks)
January	Jeff Skinner (Carolina Hurricanes)
February	Michael Grabner (New York Islanders)
March	James Reimer (Toronto Maple Leafs)

== See also ==
- Three stars (ice hockey)
- Georgia’s Own Credit Union 3 Stars of the Year Award, awarded annually to a player on the Atlanta Thrashers, based on "Three Stars" achievements
- Molson Cup, awarded annually to a player on each of the six Canadian hockey teams, given out based on "Three Stars" achievements
- Toyota Cup, awarded annually to a player on the Philadelphia Flyers, based on "Three Stars" achievements
- NHL All-Star team
