= 2010–11 Minnesota Wild season =

National Hockey League team season

2010–11 Minnesota Wild
- Division: 3rd Northwest
- Conference: 12th Western
- 2010–11 record: 39–35–8
- Home record: 19–17–5
- Road record: 20–18–3
- Goals for: 206
- Goals against: 233

Team information
- General manager: Chuck Fletcher
- Coach: Todd Richards
- Captain: Mikko Koivu
- Alternate captains: Andrew Brunette (Oct.–Dec.); Matt Cullen (Feb.–Apr.); Martin Havlat (Dec.–Feb.); John Madden (Feb.–Apr.); Nick Schultz (Oct.–Dec.); Greg Zanon (Dec.–Feb.)
- Arena: Xcel Energy Center
- Average attendance: 18,012 (99.7%)

Team leaders
- Goals: Martin Havlat (22)
- Assists: Mikko Koivu (45)
- Points: Havlat; Koivu (62)
- Penalty minutes: Brad Staubitz (173)
- Plus/minus: Clayton Stoner (+5)
- Wins: Niklas Backstrom (22)
- Goals against average: Anton Khudobin (1.59)

The 2010–11 Minnesota Wild season was the 11th season of play for the National Hockey League (NHL) franchise that was established on June 25, 1997.

The Wild posted a regular season record of 39 wins, 35 losses and 8 overtime/shootout losses for 86 points, failing to qualify for the Stanley Cup playoffs for the third consecutive season.

== Regular season ==
The Wild opened the season with two games at the Hartwall Areena in Helsinki, Finland, against the Carolina Hurricanes. Goaltender Josh Harding was seriously injured and the Wild signed free agent Jose Theodore to a one-year contract upon the team's return to Minnesota. The Wild ended the season with a 5–3 victory over the Dallas Stars, which prevented the Stars from clinching the last playoff spot and resulted in the defending Stanley Cup champion Chicago Blackhawks qualifying. At the conclusion of the season, Todd Richards was fired as head coach.

== Playoffs ==
The Wild attempted to qualify for the playoffs for the first time since the 2007–08 season. However, a 3–1 loss to the Tampa Bay Lightning on April 2 officially eliminated the team from playoff contention for a third consecutive season, finishing 12th in the West and 11 points out of a playoff spot.

== Standings ==
Northwest Division
| | | GP | W | L | OTL | ROW | GF | GA | Pts |
|---|---|---|---|---|---|---|---|---|---|
| **1** | **p-Vancouver Canucks** | **82** | **54** | **19** | **9** | **50** | **262** | **185** | **117** |
| 2 | Calgary Flames | 82 | 41 | 29 | 12 | 32 | 250 | 237 | 94 |
| 3 | Minnesota Wild | 82 | 39 | 35 | 8 | 36 | 206 | 233 | 86 |
| 4 | Colorado Avalanche | 82 | 30 | 44 | 8 | 24 | 227 | 288 | 68 |
| 5 | Edmonton Oilers | 82 | 25 | 45 | 12 | 23 | 193 | 269 | 62 |

Western Conference
| R | | Div | GP | W | L | OTL | ROW | GF | GA | Pts |
|---|---|---|---|---|---|---|---|---|---|---|
| **1** | **p – Vancouver Canucks** | **NW** | **82** | **54** | **19** | **9** | **50** | **262** | **185** | 117 |
| **2** | **y – San Jose Sharks** | **PA** | **82** | **48** | **25** | **9** | **43** | **248** | **213** | 105 |
| **3** | **y – Detroit Red Wings** | **CE** | **82** | **47** | **25** | **10** | **43** | **261** | **241** | 104 |
| **4** | **Anaheim Ducks** | **PA** | **82** | **47** | **30** | **5** | **43** | **239** | **235** | 99 |
| **5** | **Nashville Predators** | **CE** | **82** | **44** | **27** | **11** | **38** | **219** | **194** | 99 |
| **6** | **Phoenix Coyotes** | **PA** | **82** | **43** | **26** | **13** | **38** | **231** | **226** | 99 |
| **7** | **Los Angeles Kings** | **PA** | **82** | **46** | **30** | **6** | **36** | **219** | **198** | 98 |
| **8** | **Chicago Blackhawks** | **CE** | **82** | **44** | **29** | **9** | **38** | **258** | **225** | 97 |
8.5
| 9 | Dallas Stars | PA | 82 | 42 | 29 | 11 | 37 | 227 | 233 | 95 |
| 10 | Calgary Flames | NW | 82 | 41 | 29 | 12 | 32 | 250 | 237 | 94 |
| 11 | St. Louis Blues | CE | 82 | 38 | 33 | 11 | 34 | 240 | 234 | 87 |
| 12 | Minnesota Wild | NW | 82 | 39 | 35 | 8 | 36 | 206 | 233 | 86 |
| 13 | Columbus Blue Jackets | CE | 82 | 34 | 35 | 13 | 29 | 215 | 258 | 81 |
| 14 | Colorado Avalanche | NW | 82 | 30 | 44 | 8 | 24 | 227 | 288 | 68 |
| 15 | Edmonton Oilers | NW | 82 | 25 | 45 | 12 | 23 | 193 | 269 | 62 |

bold – qualified for playoffs; y – Won division; p – Won President's Trophy (best record in NHL)
CE – Central Division, NW – Northwest Division, PA – Pacific Division

== Schedule and results ==
=== Pre-season ===
2010 Pre-season Game Log: 1–4–2 (Home: 0–2–1; Road: 1–2–1)
| # | Date | Visitor | Score | Home | OT | Decision | Attendance | Record | Recap |
| 1 | September 22 | St. Louis Blues | 5–1 | Minnesota Wild | | Backstrom | 16,219 | 0–1–0 |
| 2 | September 24 | Minnesota Wild | 0–5 | St. Louis Blues | | Hackett | 11,525 | 0–2–0 |
| 3 | September 25 | Philadelphia Flyers | 3–2 | Minnesota Wild | SO | Backstrom | 16,742 | 0–2–1 |
| 4 | September 26 | Minnesota Wild | 3–4 | Montreal Canadiens | | Khudobin | 21,273 | 0–3–1 |
| 5 | September 28 | Minnesota Wild | 2–3 | Columbus Blue Jackets | SO | Backstrom | 10,268 | 0–3–2 |
| 6 | September 30 | Columbus Blue Jackets | 4–2 | Minnesota Wild | | Backstrom | 15,554 | 0–4–2 |
| 7 | October 4 (in Tampere, Finland) | Minnesota Wild | 5–1 | Ilves | | Backstrom | | 1–4–2 |

=== Regular season ===
2010–11 Game Log

October: 4–4–2 (Home: 3–3–1; Road: 1–1–1)
| # | Date | Visitor | Score | Home | OT | Decision | Attendance | Record | Pts | Recap |
| 1 | October 7 (in Helsinki, Finland) | Carolina Hurricanes | 4–3 | Minnesota Wild | | Backstrom | 12,355 | 0–1–0 | 0 |
| 2 | October 8 (in Helsinki, Finland) | Minnesota Wild | 1–2 | Carolina Hurricanes | SO | Backstrom | 13,465 | 0–1–1 | 1 |
| 3 | October 14 | Edmonton Oilers | 2–4 | Minnesota Wild | | Backstrom | 18,449 | 1–1–1 | 3 |
| 4 | October 16 | Columbus Blue Jackets | 3–2 | Minnesota Wild | | Backstrom | 17,336 | 1–2–1 | 3 |
| 5 | October 19 | Vancouver Canucks | 2–6 | Minnesota Wild | | Backstrom | 16,806 | 2–2–1 | 5 |
| 6 | October 21 | Minnesota Wild | 4–2 | Edmonton Oilers | | Backstrom | 16,839 | 3–2–1 | 7 |
| 7 | October 22 | Minnesota Wild | 1–5 | Vancouver Canucks | | Theodore | 18,860 | 3–3–1 | 7 |
| 8 | October 25 | Los Angeles Kings | 3–2 | Minnesota Wild | SO | Backstrom | 17,094 | 3–3–2 | 8 |
| 9 | October 28 | Washington Capitals | 1–2 | Minnesota Wild | | Backstrom | 17,352 | 4–3–2 | 10 |
| 10 | October 30 | Chicago Blackhawks | 3–1 | Minnesota Wild | | Backstrom | 18,376 | 4–4–2 | 10 |

November: 7–6–0 (Home: 4–2–0; Road: 3–4–0)
| # | Date | Visitor | Score | Home | OT | Decision | Attendance | Record | Pts | Recap |
| 11 | November 2 | San Jose Sharks | 0–1 | Minnesota Wild | | Backstrom | 16,502 | 5–4–2 | 12 |
| 12 | November 5 | Calgary Flames | 1–2 | Minnesota Wild | | Backstrom | 17,124 | 6–4–2 | 14 |
| 13 | November 6 | Minnesota Wild | 2–1 | Columbus Blue Jackets | | Theodore | 13,457 | 7–4–2 | 16 |
| 14 | November 11 | Minnesota Wild | 1–5 | Atlanta Thrashers | | Backstrom | 10,055 | 7–5–2 | 16 |
| 15 | November 12 | Minnesota Wild | 1–2 | Florida Panthers | | Theodore | 15,043 | 7–6–2 | 16 |
| 16 | November 14 | Minnesota Wild | 4–1 | Tampa Bay Lightning | | Backstrom | 14,868 | 8–6–2 | 18 |
| 17 | November 17 | Anaheim Ducks | 1–2 | Minnesota Wild | OT | Backstrom | 16,890 | 9–6–2 | 20 |
| 18 | November 19 | Minnesota Wild | 4–3 | Detroit Red Wings | OT | Theodore | 20,066 | 10–6–2 | 22 |
| 19 | November 20 | New York Rangers | 5–2 | Minnesota Wild | | Backstrom | 18,695 | 10–7–2 | 22 |
| 20 | November 24 | Philadelphia Flyers | 6–1 | Minnesota Wild | | Backstrom | 16,516 | 10–8–2 | 22 |
| 21 | November 26 | Nashville Predators | 2–5 | Minnesota Wild | | Theodore | 17,814 | 11–8–2 | 24 |
| 22 | November 27 | Minnesota Wild | 4–7 | Colorado Avalanche | | Backstrom | 18,007 | 11–9–2 | 24 |
| 23 | November 29 | Minnesota Wild | 0–3 | Calgary Flames | | Theodore | 19,289 | 11–10–2 | 24 |

December: 6–5–3 (Home: 2–4–1; Road: 4–1–2)
| # | Date | Visitor | Score | Home | OT | Decision | Attendance | Record | Pts | Recap |
| 24 | December 1 | Phoenix Coyotes | 4–2 | Minnesota Wild | | Theodore | 17,101 | 11–11–2 | 24 |
| 25 | December 3 | Calgary Flames | 3–2 | Minnesota Wild | SO | Backstrom | 17,130 | 11–11–3 | 25 |
| 26 | December 4 | Minnesota Wild | 3–4 | Dallas Stars | OT | Theodore | 14,344 | 11–11–4 | 26 |
| 27 | December 9 | Minnesota Wild | 3–2 | Phoenix Coyotes | | Backstrom | 7,749 | 12–11–4 | 28 |
| 28 | December 11 | Minnesota Wild | 3–2 | Los Angeles Kings | OT | Theodore | 18,118 | 13–11–4 | 30 |
| 29 | December 12 | Minnesota Wild | 2–6 | Anaheim Ducks | | Backstrom | 14,338 | 13–12–4 | 30 |
| 30 | December 16 | Ottawa Senators | 3–1 | Minnesota Wild | | Theodore | 17,366 | 13–13–4 | 30 |
| 31 | December 18 | Minnesota Wild | 3–1 | Calgary Flames | | Backstrom | 19,289 | 14–13–4 | 32 |
| 32 | December 20 | Calgary Flames | 1–4 | Minnesota Wild | | Backstrom | 18,315 | 15–13–4 | 34 |
| 33 | December 23 | Minnesota Wild | 3–1 | Colorado Avalanche | | Backstrom | 16,323 | 16–13–4 | 36 |
| 34 | December 26 | Detroit Red Wings | 4–1 | Minnesota Wild | | Backstrom | 19,227 | 16–14–4 | 36 |
| 35 | December 27 | Minnesota Wild | 3–4 | Columbus Blue Jackets | SO | Theodore | 14,454 | 16–14–5 | 37 |
| 36 | December 29 | San Jose Sharks | 3–5 | Minnesota Wild | | Backstrom | 19,131 | 17–14–5 | 39 |
| 37 | December 31 | Nashville Predators | 4–1 | Minnesota Wild | | Backstrom | 18,285 | 17–15–5 | 39 |

January: 8–4–0 (Home: 2–2–0; Road: 6–2–0)
| # | Date | Visitor | Score | Home | OT | Decision | Attendance | Record | Pts | Recap |
| 38 | January 2 | Phoenix Coyotes | 5–6 | Minnesota Wild | OT | Theodore | 17,240 | 18–15–5 | 41 |
| 39 | January 4 | Minnesota Wild | 2–1 | New Jersey Devils | | Theodore | 13,257 | 19–15–5 | 43 |
| 40 | January 6 | Minnesota Wild | 3–1 | Boston Bruins | | Theodore | 17,565 | 20–15–5 | 45 |
| 41 | January 8 | Minnesota Wild | 4–0 | Pittsburgh Penguins | | Theodore | 18,263 | 21–15–5 | 47 |
| 42 | January 9 | Dallas Stars | 4–0 | Minnesota Wild | | Theodore | 18,082 | 21–16–5 | 47 |
| 43 | January 11 | Minnesota Wild | 1–5 | Nashville Predators | | Theodore | 15,311 | 21–17–5 | 47 |
| 44 | January 14 | Colorado Avalanche | 4–1 | Minnesota Wild | | Khudobin | 18,218 | 21–18–5 | 47 |
| 45 | January 16 | Vancouver Canucks | 0–4 | Minnesota Wild | | Khudobin | 18,458 | 22–18–5 | 49 |
| 46 | January 18 | Minnesota Wild | 4–1 | Edmonton Oilers | | Khudobin | 16,839 | 23–18–5 | 51 |
| 47 | January 19 | Minnesota Wild | 6–0 | Calgary Flames | | Backstrom | 19,289 | 24–18–5 | 53 |
| 48 | January 22 | Minnesota Wild | 3–4 | San Jose Sharks | | Backstrom | 17,562 | 24–19–5 | 53 |
| 49 | January 25 | Minnesota Wild | 4–2 | Chicago Blackhawks | | Backstrom | 21,247 | 25–19–5 | 55 |

February: 8–5–1 (Home: 5–2–1; Road: 3–3–0)
| # | Date | Visitor | Score | Home | OT | Decision | Attendance | Record | Pts | Recap |
| 50 | February 1 | Los Angeles Kings | 0–1 | Minnesota Wild | SO | Backstrom | 17,504 | 26–19–5 | 57 |
| 51 | February 3 | Minnesota Wild | 4–3 | Colorado Avalanche | | Theodore | 13,818 | 27–19–5 | 59 |
| 52 | February 5 | Minnesota Wild | 0–1 | Phoenix Coyotes | | Backstrom | 14,587 | 27–20–5 | 59 |
| 53 | February 9 | Colorado Avalanche | 2–3 | Minnesota Wild | | Backstrom | 18,194 | 28–20–5 | 61 |
| 54 | February 11 | Minnesota Wild | 5–4 | St. Louis Blues | SO | Theodore | 19,150 | 29–20–5 | 63 |
| 55 | February 12 | St. Louis Blues | 1–3 | Minnesota Wild | | Backstrom | 19,322 | 30–20–5 | 65 |
| 56 | February 15 | Vancouver Canucks | 4–1 | Minnesota Wild | | Backstrom | 18,106 | 30–21–5 | 65 |
| 57 | February 16 | Minnesota Wild | 1–3 | Chicago Blackhawks | | Theodore | 21,535 | 30–22–5 | 65 |
| 58 | February 18 | Anaheim Ducks | 1–5 | Minnesota Wild | | Backstrom | 18,967 | 31–22–5 | 67 |
| 59 | February 20 | Detroit Red Wings | 2–1 | Minnesota Wild | SO | Backstrom | 18,912 | 31–22–6 | 68 |
| 60 | February 22 | Edmonton Oilers | 1–4 | Minnesota Wild | | Backstrom | 17,321 | 32–22–6 | 70 |
| 61 | February 24 | Minnesota Wild | 2–4 | Los Angeles Kings | | Backstrom | 18,118 | 32–23–6 | 70 |
| 62 | February 25 | Minnesota Wild | 3–2 | Anaheim Ducks | OT | Theodore | 13,617 | 33–23–6 | 72 |
| 63 | February 28 | Chicago Blackhawks | 4–2 | Minnesota Wild | | Backstrom | 19,155 | 33–24–6 | 72 |

March: 4–8–2 (Home: 2–3–2; Road: 2–5–0)
| # | Date | Visitor | Score | Home | OT | Decision | Attendance | Record | Pts | Recap |
| 64 | March 2 | Minnesota Wild | 1–4 | New York Islanders | | Backstrom | 7,098 | 33–25–6 | 72 |
| 65 | March 3 | Minnesota Wild | 3–1 | New York Rangers | | Theodore | 18,200 | 34–25–6 | 74 |
| 66 | March 6 | Buffalo Sabres | 3–2 | Minnesota Wild | OT | Theodore | 18,091 | 34–25–7 | 75 |
| 67 | March 8 | Colorado Avalanche | 2–5 | Minnesota Wild | | Backstrom | 18,441 | 35–25–7 | 77 |
| 68 | March 10 | Minnesota Wild | 0–4 | Nashville Predators | | Backstrom | 15,343 | 35–26–7 | 77 |
| 69 | March 11 | Minnesota Wild | 0–4 | Dallas Stars | | Theodore | 14,545 | 35–27–7 | 77 |
| 70 | March 14 | Minnesota Wild | 2–4 | Vancouver Canucks | | Backstrom | 18,860 | 35–28–7 | 77 |
| 71 | March 17 | Minnesota Wild | 2–3 | San Jose Sharks | | Backstrom | 17,562 | 35–29–7 | 77 |
| 72 | March 19 | Columbus Blue Jackets | 5–4 | Minnesota Wild | OT | Backstrom | 18,305 | 35–29–8 | 78 |
| 73 | March 20 | Montreal Canadiens | 8–1 | Minnesota Wild | | Theodore | 18,595 | 35–30–8 | 78 |
| 74 | March 22 | Toronto Maple Leafs | 3–0 | Minnesota Wild | | Backstrom | 18,761 | 35–31–8 | 78 |
| 75 | March 26 | St. Louis Blues | 6–3 | Minnesota Wild | | Backstrom | 18,112 | 35–32–8 | 78 |
| 76 | March 29 | Minnesota Wild | 3–2 | St. Louis Blues | SO | Theodore | 19,150 | 36–32–8 | 80 |
| 77 | March 31 | Edmonton Oilers | 2–4 | Minnesota Wild | | Backstrom | 18,120 | 37–32–8 | 82 |

April: 2–3–0 (Home: 1–1–0; Road: 1–2–0)
| # | Date | Visitor | Score | Home | OT | Decision | Attendance | Record | Pts | Recap |
| 78 | April 2 | Tampa Bay Lightning | 3–1 | Minnesota Wild | | Backstrom | 18,591 | 37–33–8 | 82 |
| 79 | April 3 | Minnesota Wild | 2–4 | Detroit Red Wings | | Theodore | 20,066 | 37–34–8 | 82 |
| 80 | April 7 | Minnesota Wild | 0–5 | Vancouver Canucks | | Backstrom | 18,860 | 37–35–8 | 82 |
| 81 | April 8 | Minnesota Wild | 3–1 | Edmonton Oilers | | Theodore | 16,839 | 38–35–8 | 84 |
| 82 | April 10 | Dallas Stars | 3–5 | Minnesota Wild | | Theodore | 18,504 | 39–35–8 | 86 |

Legend: Win (2 points) Loss (0 points) Overtime/shootout loss (1 point)

== Player statistics ==
=== Skaters ===
Note: GP = Games played; G = Goals; A = Assists; Pts = Points; +/− = Plus/Minus; PIM = Penalty minutes

Regular season

| Player | GP | G | A | Pts | +/− | PIM |
|---|---|---|---|---|---|---|
| Martin Havlat | 78 | 22 | 40 | 62 | −10 | 52 |
| Mikko Koivu | 71 | 17 | 45 | 62 | 4 | 50 |
| Andrew Brunette | 82 | 18 | 28 | 46 | −7 | 16 |
| Brent Burns | 80 | 17 | 29 | 46 | −10 | 98 |
| Matt Cullen | 78 | 12 | 27 | 39 | −14 | 34 |
| Pierre-Marc Bouchard | 59 | 12 | 26 | 38 | −3 | 14 |
| Kyle Brodziak | 80 | 16 | 21 | 37 | −4 | 56 |
| Antti Miettinen | 73 | 16 | 19 | 35 | −3 | 38 |
| Cal Clutterbuck | 76 | 19 | 15 | 34 | −5 | 79 |
| John Madden | 76 | 12 | 13 | 25 | −9 | 10 |
| Marek Zidlicky | 46 | 7 | 17 | 24 | −6 | 30 |
| Nick Schultz | 74 | 3 | 14 | 17 | −4 | 38 |
| Chuck Kobasew | 63 | 9 | 7 | 16 | −6 | 19 |
| Jared Spurgeon | 53 | 4 | 8 | 12 | −1 | 2 |
| Eric Nystrom | 82 | 4 | 8 | 12 | −16 | 30 |
| Clayton Stoner | 57 | 2 | 7 | 9 | 5 | 96 |
| Brad Staubitz | 71 | 4 | 5 | 9 | −5 | 173 |
| Greg Zanon | 82 | 0 | 7 | 7 | −5 | 48 |
| Patrick O'Sullivan^{†} | 21 | 1 | 6 | 7 | −1 | 2 |
| Guillaume Latendresse | 11 | 3 | 3 | 6 | 2 | 8 |
| Cam Barker | 52 | 1 | 4 | 5 | −10 | 34 |
| Justin Falk | 22 | 0 | 3 | 3 | −4 | 6 |
| Carson McMillan | 4 | 1 | 1 | 2 | 1 | 0 |
| Marco Scandella | 20 | 0 | 2 | 2 | −9 | 2 |
| Casey Wellman | 15 | 1 | 1 | 2 | −1 | 4 |
| Warren Peters | 11 | 1 | 0 | 1 | −2 | 4 |
| Colton Gillies | 7 | 1 | 0 | 1 | −2 | 2 |
| Jed Ortmeyer | 4 | 0 | 0 | 0 | −1 | 2 |
| Drew Bagnall | 2 | 0 | 0 | 0 | −2 | 4 |
| Robbie Earl | 6 | 0 | 0 | 0 | −3 | 0 |
| Matt Kassian | 4 | 0 | 0 | 0 | −1 | 12 |
| Cody Almond | 8 | 0 | 0 | 0 | 0 | 2 |
| Maxim Noreau | 5 | 0 | 0 | 0 | −1 | 0 |
| Nate Prosser | 2 | 0 | 0 | 0 | 0 | 0 |

=== Goaltenders ===
Note: GP = Games played; TOI = Time on ice (minutes); W = Wins; L = Losses; OT = Overtime losses; GA = Goals against; GAA= Goals against average; SA= Shots against; SV= Saves; Sv% = Save percentage; SO= Shutouts

Regular season

| Player | GP | TOI | W | L | OT | GA | GAA | SA | Sv% | SO | G | A | PIM |
|---|---|---|---|---|---|---|---|---|---|---|---|---|---|
| Niklas Backstrom | 51 | 2978 | 22 | 23 | 5 | 132 | 2.66 | 1566 | .916 | 3 | 0 | 1 | 2 |
| Jose Theodore | 32 | 1793 | 15 | 11 | 3 | 81 | 2.71 | 963 | .916 | 1 | 0 | 0 | 2 |
| Anton Khudobin^{‡} | 4 | 189 | 2 | 1 | 0 | 5 | 1.59 | 86 | .942 | 1 | 0 | 0 | 0 |

^{†}Denotes player spent time with another team before joining Wild. Stats reflect time with Wild only.
^{‡}Traded mid-season. Stats reflect time with Wild only.

== Awards and records ==
=== Awards ===
Regular season
| Player | Award | Awarded |
| Jose Theodore | NHL Third Star of the Week | January 10, 2011 |

=== Milestones ===
Regular season
| Player | Milestone | Reached |
| Antti Miettinen | 400th Career NHL Game | October 7, 2010 |
| Brent Burns | 100th Career NHL Assist | October 19, 2010 |
| Justin Falk | 1st Career NHL Assist; 1st Career NHL Point | October 19, 2010 |
| John Madden | 800th Career NHL Game | October 28, 2010 |
| Matt Kassian | 1st Career NHL Game | November 5, 2010 |
| Marco Scandella | 1st Career NHL Game | November 12, 2010 |
| Matt Cullen | 300th Career NHL Assist | November 15, 2010 |
| Marco Scandella | 1st Career NHL Assist; 1st Career NHL Point | November 17, 2010 |
| Brad Staubitz | 100th Career NHL Game | November 20, 2010 |
| Matt Cullen | 900th Career NHL Game | November 24, 2010 |
| Jared Spurgeon | 1st Career NHL Game | November 29, 2010 |
| Brent Burns | 400th Career NHL Game | December 12, 2010 |
| Patrick O'Sullivan | 300th Career NHL Game | December 16, 2010 |
| Kyle Brodziak | 100th Career NHL Point | December 20, 2010 |
| Mikko Koivu | 400th Career NHL Game; 200th Career NHL Assist | January 2, 2011 |
| Clayton Stoner | 1st Career NHL Goal | January 4, 2011 |
| Patrick O'Sullivan | 100th Career NHL Assist | January 6, 2011 |
| Kyle Brodziak | 300th Career NHL Game | January 11, 2011 |
| Anton Khudobin | 1st Career NHL Shutout | January 16, 2011 |
| Pierre-Marc Bouchard | 200th Career NHL Assist | January 18, 2011 |
| Cal Clutterbuck | 200th Career NHL Game | January 19, 2011 |
| Martin Havlat | 200th Career NHL Goal | January 19, 2011 |
| Antti Miettinen | 200th Career NHL Point | January 25, 2011 |
| Jared Spurgeon | 1st Career NHL Assist; 1st Career NHL Point | January 25, 2011 |
| Andrew Brunette | 1,000th Career NHL Game | February 1, 2011 |
| Mikko Koivu | 300th Career NHL Point | February 3, 2011 |
| Martin Havlat | 600th Career NHL Game | February 16, 2011 |
| Martin Havlat | 500th Career NHL Point | February 20, 2011 |
| Jared Spurgeon | 1st Career NHL Goal | February 22, 2011 |
| Martin Havlat | 300th Career NHL Assist | March 6, 2011 |
| Marek Zidlicky | 500th Career NHL Game | March 6, 2011 |
| Nick Schultz | 100th Career NHL Assist | March 19, 2011 |
| Andrew Brunette | 700th Career NHL Point | March 26, 2011 |
| Matt Cullen | 500th Career NHL Point | March 31, 2011 |
| Pierre-Marc Bouchard | 300th Career NHL Point | March 31, 2011 |
| Carson McMillan | 1st Career NHL Game; 1st Career NHL Goal; 1st Career NHL Point | April 3, 2011 |
| Drew Bagnall | 1st Career NHL Game | April 8, 2011 |
| Carson McMillan | 1st Career NHL Assist | April 10, 2011 |

== Transactions ==
The Wild have been involved in the following transactions during the 2010–11 season.

=== Trades ===
| Date | Details |
| June 21, 2010 | To San Jose Sharks 5th-round pick in 2010 – Freddie Hamilton | To Minnesota Wild Brad Staubitz |
| June 26, 2010 | To Florida Panthers 3rd-round pick in 2010 – Joe Basaraba; 4th-round pick in 2010 – Joonas Donskoi | To Minnesota Wild 2nd-round pick in 2010 – Jason Zucker |
| February 28, 2011 | To Boston Bruins Anton Khudobin | To Minnesota Wild Jeff Penner; Mikko Lehtonen |
| March 1, 2011 | To Columbus Blue Jackets Petr Kalus | To Minnesota Wild Future considerations |

|}

=== Free agents acquired ===
| Player | Former team | Contract terms |
| Matt Cullen | Ottawa Senators | 3 years, $10.5 million |
| Eric Nystrom | Calgary Flames | 3 years, $4.2 million |
| Warren Peters | Dallas Stars | 2 years, $1.075 million |
| Drew Bagnall | Manchester Monarchs | 1 year, $600,000 |
| Dennis Endras | Augsburger Panther | 1 year, $740,000 entry-level contract |
| Joel Broda | Calgary Hitmen | 3 years, $1.65 million entry-level contract |
| John Madden | Chicago Blackhawks | 1 year, $1 million |
| Josh Caron | Kamloops Blazers | 3 years, $1.61 million entry-level contract |
| Colton Jobke | Kelowna Rockets | 3 years, $1.64 million entry-level contract |
| Jared Spurgeon | Spokane Chiefs | 3 years, $1.58 million entry-level contract |
| Jose Theodore | Washington Capitals | 1 year, $1.1 million |
| Jed Ortmeyer | San Antonio Rampage | 1 year, $525,000 |
| Chay Genoway | University of North Dakota | 1 year, $900,000 entry-level contract |
| Justin Fontaine | University of Minnesota Duluth | 2 years, $1.19 million entry-level contract |

=== Free agents lost ===
| Player | New team | Contract terms |
| Derek Boogaard | New York Rangers | 4 years, $6.5 million |
| John Scott | Chicago Blackhawks | 2 years, $1.025 million |
| Andrew Ebbett | Phoenix Coyotes | 1 year, $500,000 |
| Jaime Sifers | Atlanta Thrashers | 1 year, $525,000 |
| Andy Hilbert | New York Islanders | 1 year, $575,000 |
| Wade Dubielewicz | Kölner Haie | undisclosed |
| Owen Nolan | ZSC Lions | undisclosed |
| Shane Hnidy | Boston Bruins | 1 year, $500,000 |

=== Claimed via waivers ===
| Player | Former team | Date claimed off waivers |
|---|---|---|
| Patrick O'Sullivan | Carolina Hurricanes | November 23, 2010 |

=== Lost via waivers ===
| Player | New team | Date claimed off waivers |

=== Player signings ===
| Player | Contract terms |
| Jean-Michel Daoust | 1 year, $500,000 |
| Chad Rau | 2 years, $1.075 million |
| James Sheppard | 1 year, $803,250 |
| Brad Staubitz | 2 years, $1.15 million |
| Nate Prosser | 1 year, $650,000 |
| Matt Kassian | 2 years, $1.025 million |
| Guillaume Latendresse | 2 years, $5 million |
| Jon DiSalvatore | 2 years, $5 million |
| Jamie Fraser | 2 years, $5 million |
| Robbie Earl | 1 year, $550,000 |
| Josh Harding | 1 year, $1.2 million |
| Mikko Koivu | 7 years, $47.25 million contract extension |
| Dennis Endras | 1 year, $660,000 contract extension |
| Brett Bulmer | 3 years, $2.43 entry-level contract |

== Draft picks ==
Minnesota's picks at the 2010 NHL entry draft in Los Angeles, California.

| Round | # | Player | Position | Nationality | College/Junior/Club team (League) |
|---|---|---|---|---|---|
| 1 | 9 | Mikael Granlund | C | Finland | HIFK (SM-liiga) |
| 2 | 39 | Brett Bulmer | RW | Canada | Kelowna Rockets (WHL) |
| 2 | 56 (from Washington) | Johan Larsson | C | Sweden | Brynäs IF (J20 SuperElit) |
| 2 | 59 (from Philadelphia via Los Angeles and Florida) | Jason Zucker | RW | United States | U.S. National Team Development Program (USHL) |
| 6 | 159 | Johan Gustafsson | G | Sweden | Färjestad BK Jr. (Sweden Jr-2) |
| 7 | 189 | Dylan McKinlay | RW | Canada | Chilliwack Bruins (WHL) |

== Farm teams ==
The Houston Aeros remain Minnesota's primary American Hockey League affiliate in 2010–11 and the Bakersfield Condors will become the team's ECHL affiliate in 2010–11.
