= 2010–11 Colorado Avalanche season =

National Hockey League team season

2010–11 Colorado Avalanche
- Division: 4th Northwest
- Conference: 14th Western
- 2010–11 record: 30–44–8
- Home record: 16–21–4
- Road record: 14–23–4
- Goals for: 227
- Goals against: 288

Team information
- General manager: Greg Sherman
- Coach: Joe Sacco
- Captain: Adam Foote
- Alternate captains: Milan Hejduk; Paul Stastny
- Arena: Pepsi Center
- Average attendance: 14,752 (81.9%)

Team leaders
- Goals: Matt Duchene; David Jones (27)
- Assists: Matt Duchene; John-Michael Liles (40)
- Points: Matt Duchene (67)
- Penalty minutes: Cody McLeod (189)
- Plus/minus: Greg Mauldin (+5)
- Wins: Peter Budaj (15)
- Goals against average: Peter Budaj (3.20)

The 2010–11 Colorado Avalanche season was the 32nd season for the National Hockey League (NHL) franchise that was established on June 22, 1979, and 16th season since the franchise relocated to Colorado to start the 1995–96 NHL season.

The Avalanche posted a regular season record of 30 wins, 44 losses and 8 overtime/shootout losses for 68 points, failing to qualify for the 2011 Stanley Cup playoffs for the second time in three seasons.

== Off-season ==
At the 2010 NHL entry draft, the Avalanche chose Joey Hishon, a centre, with the 17th overall pick.

== Regular season ==
The Avalanche lost number one goaltender Craig Anderson on October 26 to a knee injury. Anderson, who was to be the backup that night in a game against the Vancouver Canucks, was participating in pre-game drills when he injured his knee. Peter Budaj stepped into the starting goaltender job and played well, but overall the Avalanche's goaltending has been an issue during the season. After joining the Avalanche during practice on January 22, Peter Forsberg decided to make a return to the NHL and signed a contract for the remainder of the 2010–11 season with the Avalanche on February 6. Forsberg played in two games with the Avalanche before announcing his retirement on February 14. Captain Adam Foote announced his retirement from the NHL on April 8, 2011, and played in his final game two days later on April 10 against the Edmonton Oilers.

The Avalanche struggled defensively during the regular season, finishing 30th overall in goals allowed, with 287 (excluding one shootout goal allowed). They also struggled on the penalty kill, allowing the most power-play goals in the league with 75 and had the lowest penalty-kill percentage in the league at 76.11%.

== Playoffs ==
The Colorado Avalanche failed to qualify for the 2011 Stanley Cup playoffs.

== Standings ==
Northwest Division
		GP	W	L	OTL	ROW	GF	GA	Pts
**1**	**p-Vancouver Canucks**	**82**	**54**	**19**	**9**	**50**	**262**	**185**	**117**
2	Calgary Flames	82	41	29	12	32	250	237	94
3	Minnesota Wild	82	39	35	8	36	206	233	86
4	Colorado Avalanche	82	30	44	8	24	227	288	68
5	Edmonton Oilers	82	25	45	12	23	193	269	62

Western Conference
R		Div	GP	W	L	OTL	ROW	GF	GA	Pts
**1**	**p – Vancouver Canucks**	**NW**	**82**	**54**	**19**	**9**	**50**	**262**	**185**	117
**2**	**y – San Jose Sharks**	**PA**	**82**	**48**	**25**	**9**	**43**	**248**	**213**	105
**3**	**y – Detroit Red Wings**	**CE**	**82**	**47**	**25**	**10**	**43**	**261**	**241**	104
**4**	**Anaheim Ducks**	**PA**	**82**	**47**	**30**	**5**	**43**	**239**	**235**	99
**5**	**Nashville Predators**	**CE**	**82**	**44**	**27**	**11**	**38**	**219**	**194**	99
**6**	**Phoenix Coyotes**	**PA**	**82**	**43**	**26**	**13**	**38**	**231**	**226**	99
**7**	**Los Angeles Kings**	**PA**	**82**	**46**	**30**	**6**	**36**	**219**	**198**	98
**8**	**Chicago Blackhawks**	**CE**	**82**	**44**	**29**	**9**	**38**	**258**	**225**	97
8.5
9	Dallas Stars	PA	82	42	29	11	37	227	233	95
10	Calgary Flames	NW	82	41	29	12	32	250	237	94
11	St. Louis Blues	CE	82	38	33	11	34	240	234	87
12	Minnesota Wild	NW	82	39	35	8	36	206	233	86
13	Columbus Blue Jackets	CE	82	34	35	13	29	215	258	81
14	Colorado Avalanche	NW	82	30	44	8	24	227	288	68
15	Edmonton Oilers	NW	82	25	45	12	23	193	269	62

bold – qualified for playoffs; y – Won division; p – Won President's Trophy (best record in NHL)
CE – Central Division, NW – Northwest Division, PA – Pacific Division

== Schedule and results ==
=== Pre-season ===
2010 Pre-season Game Log: 3–3–0 (Home: 3–0–0; Road: 0–3–0)

#	Date	Visitor	Score	Home	OT	Decision	Record	Recap
1	September 21	Colorado Avalanche	3 - 1	St. Louis Blues		Cann, Budaj	1-0-0	
2	September 22	Los Angeles Kings	4 - 2	Colorado Avalanche		Grahame, Anderson	1-1-0	
3	September 24	Colorado Avalanche	1 - 2	Dallas Stars		Budaj, Bacashihua	1-2-0	
4	September 26	St. Louis Blues	2 - 0	Colorado Avalanche		Anderson	1-3-0	
5	September 28	Dallas Stars	1 - 2	Colorado Avalanche		Budaj	2-3-0	
6	September 30	Colorado Avalanche	1 - 2	Dallas Stars		Anderson	2-4-0	
7	October 2 (in Las Vegas, Nevada)	Colorado Avalanche	2 - 3	Los Angeles Kings		Anderson	2-5-0	

=== Regular season ===
Win (2 points) Loss (0 points) Overtime/shootout loss (1 point)

2010–11 Game log
October: 6–4–1 (Home: 2–2–0; Road: 4–2–1)

#	Date	Visitor	Score	Home	OT	Decision	Attendance	Record	Pts	Recap
1	October 7	Chicago Blackhawks	3 - 4	Colorado Avalanche	OT	Anderson	18,007	1-0-0	2	
2	October 11	Colorado Avalanche	2 - 4	Philadelphia Flyers		Anderson	19,652	1-1-0	2	
3	October 12	Colorado Avalanche	5 - 4	Detroit Red Wings	SO	Budaj	19,651	2-1-0	4	
4	October 15	Colorado Avalanche	3 - 2	New Jersey Devils		Anderson	12,221	3-1-0	6	
5	October 16	Colorado Avalanche	2 - 5	New York Islanders		Anderson	10,127	3-2-0	6	
6	October 18	Colorado Avalanche	3 - 1	New York Rangers		Anderson	17,711	4-2-0	8	
7	October 21	San Jose Sharks	4 - 2	Colorado Avalanche		Anderson	12,803	4-3-0	8	
8	October 23	Los Angeles Kings	6 - 4	Colorado Avalanche		Anderson	15,478	4-4-0	8	
9	October 26	Colorado Avalanche	3 - 4	Vancouver Canucks	OT	Budaj	18,860	4-4-1	9	
10	October 28	Colorado Avalanche	6 - 5	Calgary Flames		Budaj	19,289	5-4-1	11	
11	October 30	Columbus Blue Jackets	1 - 5	Colorado Avalanche		Budaj	13,017	6-4-1	13	

November: 7–5–1 (Home: 5–2–1; Road: 2–3–0)

#	Date	Visitor	Score	Home	OT	Decision	Attendance	Record	Pts	Recap
12	November 4	Vancouver Canucks	3 - 1	Colorado Avalanche		Budaj	12,732	6-5-1	13	
13	November 6	Dallas Stars	0 - 5	Colorado Avalanche		Budaj	16,172	7-5-1	15	
14	November 9	Calgary Flames	4 - 2	Colorado Avalanche		Budaj	12,219	7-6-1	15	
15	November 12	Colorado Avalanche	5 - 1	Columbus Blue Jackets		Budaj	13,594	8-6-1	17	
16	November 13	Colorado Avalanche	1 - 3	Detroit Red Wings		Budaj	20,066	8-7-1	17	
17	November 15	St. Louis Blues	3 - 6	Colorado Avalanche		Budaj	12,670	9-7-1	19	
18	November 17	San Jose Sharks	3 - 4	Colorado Avalanche	OT	Budaj	12,436	10-7-1	21	
19	November 19	New York Rangers	1 - 5	Colorado Avalanche		Anderson	16,002	11-7-1	23	
20	November 20	Colorado Avalanche	4 - 3	Dallas Stars	SO	Budaj	17,441	12-7-1	25	
21	November 24	Colorado Avalanche	2 - 4	Vancouver Canucks		Budaj	18,860	12-8-1	25	
22	November 25	Colorado Avalanche	2 - 3	Edmonton Oilers		Budaj	16,839	12-9-1	25	
23	November 27	Minnesota Wild	4 - 7	Colorado Avalanche		Budaj	18,007	13-9-1	27	
24	November 30	Atlanta Thrashers	3 - 2	Colorado Avalanche	OT	Budaj	12,131	13-9-2	28	

December: 7–4–3 (Home: 3–2–1; Road: 4–2–2)

#	Date	Visitor	Score	Home	OT	Decision	Attendance	Record	Pts	Recap
25	December 3	Colorado Avalanche	1 - 2	Carolina Hurricanes	OT	Anderson	16,277	13-9-3	29	
26	December 4	Colorado Avalanche	5 - 6	Tampa Bay Lightning		Budaj	18,212	13-10-3	29	
27	December 7	Colorado Avalanche	3 - 4	Florida Panthers	OT	Anderson	12,971	13-10-4	30	
28	December 10	Colorado Avalanche	4 - 2	Atlanta Thrashers		Anderson	14,034	14-10-4	32	
29	December 11	Colorado Avalanche	3 - 2	Washington Capitals		Anderson	18,398	15-10-4	34	
30	December 13	Chicago Blackhawks	5 - 7	Colorado Avalanche		Anderson	15,924	16-10-4	36	
31	December 15	Colorado Avalanche	4 - 3	Chicago Blackhawks		Anderson	21,121	17-10-4	38	
32	December 17	Ottawa Senators	5 - 6	Colorado Avalanche	OT	Anderson	15,113	18-10-4	40	
33	December 19	Montreal Canadiens	2 - 3	Colorado Avalanche		Anderson	18,007	19-10-4	42	
34	December 21	Los Angeles Kings	5 - 0	Colorado Avalanche		Anderson	15,891	19-11-4	42	
35	December 23	Minnesota Wild	3 - 1	Colorado Avalanche		Anderson	16,323	19-12-4	42	
36	December 27	Detroit Red Wings	4 - 3	Colorado Avalanche	OT	Budaj	18,007	19-12-5	43	
37	December 30	Colorado Avalanche	4 - 3	Edmonton Oilers	SO	Anderson	16,839	20-12-5	45	
38	December 31	Colorado Avalanche	2 - 3	Calgary Flames		Anderson	19,289	20-13-5	45	

January: 5–6–1 (Home: 4–5–1; Road: 1–1–0)

#	Date	Visitor	Score	Home	OT	Decision	Attendance	Record	Pts	Recap
39	January 2	Vancouver Canucks	2 - 1	Colorado Avalanche		Anderson	15,323	20-14-5	45	
40	January 4	Buffalo Sabres	3 - 4	Colorado Avalanche	OT	Budaj	12,548	21-14-5	47	
41	January 6	Phoenix Coyotes	2 - 0	Colorado Avalanche		Anderson	12,308	21-15-5	47	
42	January 8	New York Islanders	4 - 3	Colorado Avalanche	OT	Anderson	15,171	21-15-6	48	
43	January 10	Detroit Red Wings	4 - 5	Colorado Avalanche		Budaj	17,535	22-15-6	50	
44	January 12	Colorado Avalanche	0 - 4	Chicago Blackhawks		Budaj	21,356	22-16-6	50	
45	January 14	Colorado Avalanche	4 - 1	Minnesota Wild		Anderson	18,218	23-16-6	52	
46	January 18	Vancouver Canucks	3 - 4	Colorado Avalanche	OT	Anderson	12,791	24-16-6	54	
47	January 20	Nashville Predators	5 - 1	Colorado Avalanche		Anderson	12,638	24-17-6	54	
48	January 22	Boston Bruins	6 - 2	Colorado Avalanche		Anderson	18,007	24-18-6	54	
49	January 24	St. Louis Blues	3 - 4	Colorado Avalanche		Budaj	12,338	25-18-6	56	
50	January 26	Phoenix Coyotes	5 - 2	Colorado Avalanche		Anderson	13,740	25-19-6	56	

February: 1–11-1 (Home: 0–4–1; Road: 1–7–0)

#	Date	Visitor	Score	Home	OT	Decision	Attendance	Record	Pts	Recap
51	February 3	Minnesota Wild	4 - 3	Colorado Avalanche		Anderson	13,818	25-20-6	56	
52	February 5	Anaheim Ducks	3 - 0	Colorado Avalanche		Budaj	16,785	25-21-6	56	
53	February 7	Colorado Avalanche	0 - 3	Phoenix Coyotes		Anderson	9,508	25-22-6	56	
54	February 9	Colorado Avalanche	2 - 3	Minnesota Wild		Anderson	18,194	25-23-6	56	
55	February 11	Colorado Avalanche	1 - 3	Columbus Blue Jackets		Budaj	16,408	25-24-6	56	
56	February 12	Colorado Avalanche	3 - 5	Nashville Predators		Budaj	17,113	25-25-6	56	
57	February 14	Calgary Flames	9 - 1	Colorado Avalanche		Budaj	14,035	25-26-6	56	
58	February 16	Pittsburgh Penguins	3 - 2	Colorado Avalanche	OT	Budaj	17,357	25-26-7	57	
59	February 19	Colorado Avalanche	0 - 4	San Jose Sharks		Budaj	17,562	25-27-7	57	
60	February 22	Colorado Avalanche	4 - 3	St. Louis Blues		Budaj	19,150	26-27-7	59	
61	February 23	Edmonton Oilers	5 - 1	Colorado Avalanche		Elliott	14,801	26-28-7	59	
62	February 26	Colorado Avalanche	3 - 4	Los Angeles Kings		Elliott	18,118	26-29-7	59	
63	February 27	Colorado Avalanche	2 - 3	Anaheim Ducks		Budaj	14,510	26-30-7	59	

March: 2–10–1 (Home: 1–4–0; Road: 1–6–1)

#	Date	Visitor	Score	Home	OT	Decision	Attendance	Record	Pts	Recap
64	March 1	Colorado Avalanche	1 - 2	San Jose Sharks	SO	Elliott	17,562	26-30-8	60	
65	March 5	Edmonton Oilers	5 - 1	Colorado Avalanche		Elliott	15,869	26-31-8	60	
66	March 8	Colorado Avalanche	2 - 5	Minnesota Wild		Budaj	18,441	26-32-8	60	
67	March 11	Anaheim Ducks	6 - 2	Colorado Avalanche		Elliot	16,224	26-33-8	60	
68	March 12	Colorado Avalanche	2 - 4	Nashville Predators		Budaj	17,113	26-34-8	60	
69	March 16	Colorado Avalanche	2 - 4	Vancouver Canucks		Elliott	18,860	26-35-8	60	
70	March 17	Colorado Avalanche	2 - 5	Calgary Flames		Budaj	19,289	26-36-8	60	
71	March 19	Colorado Avalanche	3 - 2	Edmonton Oilers	SO	Elliott	16,839	27-36-8	62	
72	March 22	Columbus Blue Jackets	5 - 4	Colorado Avalanche	SO	Elliott	12,301	28-36-8	64	
73	March 24	Toronto Maple Leafs	4 - 3	Colorado Avalanche		Budaj	14,364	28-37-8	64	
74	March 26	Colorado Avalanche	1 - 4	Los Angeles Kings		Budaj	18,118	28-38-8	64	
75	March 28	Colorado Avalanche	4 - 5	Anaheim Ducks		Elliott	14,336	28-39-8	64	
76	March 31	Nashville Predators	3 - 2	Colorado Avalanche		Elliott	13,239	28-40-8	64	

April: 2–4–0 (Home: 1–2–0; Road: 1–2–0)

#	Date	Visitor	Score	Home	OT	Decision	Attendance	Record	Pts	Recap
77	April 1	Colorado Avalanche	4 - 3	Phoenix Coyotes	SO	Budaj	15,739	29-40-8	66	
78	April 3	Calgary Flames	2 - 1	Colorado Avalanche		Budaj	13,896	29-41-8	66	
79	April 5	Colorado Avalanche	1 - 3	St. Louis Blues		Budaj	19,150	29-42-8	66	
80	April 7	Colorado Avalanche	2 - 4	Dallas Stars		Elliott	15,105	29-43-8	66	
81	April 8	Dallas Stars	3 - 2	Colorado Avalanche		Budaj	14,037	29-44-8	66	
82	April 10	Edmonton Oilers	3 - 4	Colorado Avalanche	OT	Budaj	17,566	30-44-8	68	

== Player statistics ==
=== Skaters ===
Note: GP = Games played; G = Goals; A = Assists; Pts = Points; +/− = Plus/minus; PIM = Penalty minutes

Regular season

Player	GP	G	A	Pts	+/−	PIM
Matt Duchene	80	27	40	67	-8	33
Paul Stastny	74	22	35	57	-7	56
Milan Hejduk	71	22	34	56	-23	18
John-Michael Liles	76	6	40	46	-9	35
David Jones	77	27	18	45	-2	28
Chris Stewart^{‡}	36	13	17	30	-10	38
Kevin Shattenkirk^{‡}	46	7	19	26	-11	20
Daniel Winnik	80	11	15	26	-2	35
Ryan O'Reilly	74	13	13	26	-7	16
Kevin Porter	74	14	11	25	-11	27
Brandon Yip	71	12	10	22	-22	54
Tomas Fleischmann^{†}	22	8	13	21	-1	8
Philippe Dupuis	74	6	11	17	-4	40
Ryan Wilson	67	3	13	16	-8	68
TJ Galiardi	35	7	8	15	-6	12
Greg Mauldin	29	5	5	10	5	8
Erik Johnson^{†}	22	3	7	10	-5	19
Matt Hunwick^{†}	51	0	10	10	-19	16
Ryan O'Byrne^{†}	64	0	10	10	-7	71
Mark Olver	18	2	7	9	-2	18
Kyle Cumiskey	18	1	7	8	-3	10
Adam Foote	47	0	8	8	-9	33
Cody McLeod	71	5	3	8	-7	189
Jonas Holos	39	0	6	6	-3	10
Scott Hannan^{‡}	23	0	6	6	1	6
Ryan Stoa	25	2	2	4	-4	20
Jay McClement^{†}	24	1	3	4	-8	12
David Van der Gulik	6	1	2	3	4	2
Kyle Quincey	21	0	1	1	-5	18
David Liffiton	4	1	0	1	3	17
David Koci	35	1	0	1	-5	80
Cameron Gaunce	11	1	0	1	-3	16
Peter Forsberg	2	0	0	0	-4	4
Ray Macias	2	0	0	0	-1	2
Shawn Belle^{†}	4	0	0	0	1	2
Colby Cohen^{‡}	3	0	0	0	-1	4

=== Goaltenders ===
Note: GP = Games played; TOI = Time on ice (minutes); W = Wins; L = Losses; OT = Overtime losses; GA = Goals against; GAA= Goals against average; SA= Shots against; Sv% = Save percentage; SO= Shutouts; G= Goals; A= Assists; PIM= Penalties in minutes

Regular season

Player	GP	TOI	W	L	OT	GA	GAA	SA	Sv%	SO	G	A	PIM
Peter Budaj	45	2439	15	21	4	130	3.20	1234	.895	1	0	1	6
Craig Anderson^{‡}	33	1810	13	15	3	99	3.28	957	.897	0	0	1	4
Brian Elliott^{†}	12	690	2	8	1	44	3.83	404	.891	0	0	0	0

^{†}Denotes player spent time with another team before joining Avalanche. Stats reflect time with the Avalanche only.
^{‡}Traded mid-season

== Awards and records ==
=== Awards ===
Regular Season
Player	Award	Awarded
Chris Stewart	NHL Third Star of the Month	October 2010
John-Michael Liles	NHL Second Star of the Week	November 22, 2010
Matt Duchene	NHL First Star of the Week	December 20, 2010
Tomas Fleischmann	NHL Second Star of the Week	December 20, 2010

=== Records ===
Regular Season
Player	Record
John-Michael Liles	NHL record - Longest assist streak to start season by defenseman

=== Milestones ===
Regular Season
Player	Milestone	Reached
Mark Olver	1st Career NHL Game	October 7, 2010
Mark Olver	1st Career NHL Assist; 1st Career NHL Point	October 12, 2010
Jonas Holos	1st Career NHL Game	October 16, 2010
Jonas Holos	1st Career NHL Assist; 1st Career NHL Point	October 28, 2010
Peter Budaj	200th Career NHL Game	October 28, 2010
David Liffiton	1st Career NHL Goal; 1st Career NHL Point	October 30, 2010
David Jones	100th Career NHL Game	October 30, 2010
Kevin Shattenkirk	1st Career NHL Game	November 4, 2010
David Van der Gulik	1st Career NHL Goal	November 4, 2010
Colby Cohen	1st Career NHL Game	November 6, 2010
Philippe Dupuis	1st Career NHL Goal	November 6, 2010
Chris Stewart	100th Career NHL Point	November 9, 2010
Kevin Shattenkirk	1st Career NHL Assist; 1st Career NHL Point	November 12, 2010
Greg Mauldin	1st Career NHL Goal; 1st Career NHL Point	November 12, 2010
Greg Mauldin	1st Career NHL Assist	November 15, 2010
Kevin Shattenkirk	1st Career NHL Goal	November 17, 2010
Matt Duchene	100th Career NHL Game	November 19, 2010
Ryan O'Reilly	100th Career NHL Game	November 19, 2010
Paul Stastny	300th Career NHL Game	December 4, 2010
Paul Stastny	200th Career NHL Assist	December 15, 2010
TJ Galiardi	100th Career NHL Game	December 27, 2010
Craig Anderson	200th Career NHL Game	December 30, 2010
Paul Stastny	300th Career NHL Point	January 2, 2011
Tomas Fleischmann	300th Career NHL Game	January 6, 2011
Paul Stastny	100th Career NHL Goal	January 22, 2011
Ryan Wilson	100th Career NHL Game	January 24, 2011
Matt Duchene	100th Career NHL Point	January 26, 2011
John-Michael Liles	500th Career NHL Game	February 7, 2011
Kevin Porter	100th Career NHL Game	February 9, 2011
Cameron Gaunce	1st Career NHL Game	February 12, 2011
Cameron Gaunce	1st Career NHL Goal; 1st Career NHL Point	February 16, 2011
John-Michael Liles	200th Career NHL Assist	February 23, 2011
Matt Hunwick	200th Career NHL Game	February 26, 2011
Mark Olver	1st Career NHL Goal	March 17, 2011
Milan Hejduk	900th Career NHL Game	March 22, 2011
Erik Johnson	100th Career NHL Point	March 24, 2011
Peter Budaj	100th Career NHL Win	April 1, 2011
Brandon Yip	100th Career NHL Game	April 5, 2011
Milan Hejduk	400th Career NHL Assist	April 10, 2011

== Transactions ==
The Avalanche have been involved in the following transactions during the 2010–11 season.

=== Trades ===
Date	Details
June 17, 2010	To St. Louis Blues T. J. Hensick	To Colorado Avalanche Julian Talbot
June 26, 2010	To Los Angeles Kings 2nd-round pick (47th overall) in 2010 – Tyler Toffoli	To Colorado Avalanche 2nd-round pick (49th overall) in 2010 – Calvin Pickard; 4th-round pick in 2010 (Note: Pick later traded to Dallas Stars.) – Alex Theriau
June 26, 2010	To Dallas Stars 3rd-round pick (77th overall) in 2010 – Alexander Guptill; 4th-round pick in 2010 – Alex Theriau	To Colorado Avalanche 3rd-round pick (71st overall) in 2010 – Michael Bournival
June 26, 2010	To New York Islanders 3rd-round pick in 2011 – Andrey Pedan	To Colorado Avalanche 4th-round pick in 2010 – Stephen Silas
June 28, 2010	To Phoenix Coyotes 4th-round pick in 2012 – Rhett Holland	To Colorado Avalanche Daniel Winnik
November 11, 2010	To Montreal Canadiens Michael Bournival	To Colorado Avalanche Ryan O'Byrne
November 29, 2010	To Boston Bruins Colby Cohen	To Colorado Avalanche Matt Hunwick
November 30, 2010	To Washington Capitals Scott Hannan	To Colorado Avalanche Tomas Fleischmann
February 18, 2011	To Ottawa Senators Craig Anderson	To Colorado Avalanche Brian Elliott
February 18, 2011	To St. Louis Blues Kevin Shattenkirk; Chris Stewart; Conditional 2nd-round pick in 2011 or 2012 (Note: Conditional pick became a pick in 2011.) – Ty Rattie	To Colorado Avalanche Erik Johnson; Jay McClement; Conditional 1st-round pick in 2011 or 2012 (Note: Conditional pick became a pick in 2011.) – Duncan Siemens
February 28, 2011	To Edmonton Oilers Kevin Montgomery	To Colorado Avalanche Shawn Belle

=== Free agents acquired ===
Player	Former team	Contract terms
David Liffiton	Syracuse Crunch	1 year, $500,000
Greg Mauldin	New York Islanders	1 year, $500,000
David Van Der Gulik	Abbotsford Heat	1 year, $500,000
Jason Bacashihua	Hershey Bears	1 year, $500,000
Ben Walter	New Jersey Devils	1 year, $500,000
Peter Forsberg	Modo Hockey	1 year, $1 million

=== Free agents lost ===
Player	New team	Contract terms
Brett Clark	Tampa Bay Lightning	2 years, $3 million
Tyler Weiman	Vancouver Canucks	1 year, $500,000
Brian Fahey	Washington Capitals	1 year, $500,000
Brian Willsie	Washington Capitals	1 year, $525,000
Chris Durno	Tampa Bay Lightning	1 year, $550,000
Ruslan Salei	Detroit Red Wings	1 year, $750,000
Marek Svatos	Avangard Omsk	1 year
Matt Hendricks	Washington Capitals	1 year, $575,000

=== Lost via retirement ===
Player
Darcy Tucker
Peter Forsberg

=== Player signings ===
Player	Contract terms
Adam Foote	1 year, $1 million
Joel Chouinard	3 years, $1.7 million entry-level contract
Jonas Holos	2 years, $1.225 million entry-level contract
Peter Budaj	1 year, $1.25 million
David Koci	1 year, $575,000
Philippe Dupuis	1 year, $500,000
Kevin Porter	1 year, $660,000
Ray Macias	1 year, $550,000
Kyle Quincey	2 years, $6.25 million
Daniel Winnik	2 years, $1.9 million
Julian Talbot	1 year, $550,000
John Grahame	1 year, $500,000
Brandon Yip	2 years, $1.45 million
Chris Stewart	2 years, $5.75 million
Peter Mueller	2 years, $4.0 million
Luke Walker	3 years, $1.69 million entry-level contract
Joey Hishon	3 years, $2.7 million entry-level contract
Stefan Elliott	3 years, $2.53 million entry-level contract
Calvin Pickard	3 years, $2.53 million entry-level contract
Tyson Barrie	3 years, $2.145 million entry-level contract
Brad Malone	2 years, $1.375 million entry-level contract

== Draft picks ==
Colorado had 8 picks at the 2010 NHL entry draft in Los Angeles, California.

Round	#	Player	Position	Nationality	College/Junior/Club team (League)
1	17	Joey Hishon	C	Canada	Owen Sound Attack (OHL)
2	49 (from Los Angeles)	Calvin Pickard	G	Canada	Seattle Thunderbirds (WHL)
3	71 (from Dallas)	Michael Bournival	LW	Canada	Shawinigan Cataractes (QMJHL)
4	95 (from NY Islanders)	Stephen Silas	D	Canada	Belleville Bulls (OHL)
4	107	Sami Aittokallio	G	Finland	Ilves Jr. (Finland-JR.)
5	137	Troy Rutkowski	D	Canada	Portland Winterhawks (WHL)
5	139 (from Los Angeles)	Luke Walker	RW	United States	Portland Winterhawks (WHL)
7	197	Luke Moffatt	C	United States	U.S. National Team Development Program (USHL)

== Farm teams ==
=== Lake Erie Monsters ===
The Avalanche's American Hockey League affiliate is the Lake Erie Monsters, based in Cleveland, Ohio.

=== Tulsa Oilers ===
The Avalanche's Central Hockey League affiliate is the Tulsa Oilers, based in Tulsa, Oklahoma.

== See also ==
- 2010–11 NHL season
