= 2010–11 Phoenix Coyotes season =

NHL hockey team season

2010–11 Phoenix Coyotes
- Division: 3rd Pacific
- Conference: 6th Western
- 2010–11 record: 43–26–13
- Home record: 21–13–7
- Road record: 22–13–6
- Goals for: 231
- Goals against: 226

Team information
- General manager: Don Maloney
- Coach: Dave Tippett
- Captain: Shane Doan
- Alternate captains: Ed Jovanovski; Vernon Fiddler; Keith Yandle
- Arena: Jobing.com Arena
- Average attendance: 12,208 (41 gms) (71.3%)

Team leaders
- Goals: Shane Doan (20)
- Assists: Keith Yandle (48)
- Points: Shane Doan (60)
- Penalty minutes: Paul Bissonnette (71)
- Plus/minus: Adrian Aucoin (+18)
- Wins: Ilya Bryzgalov (36)
- Goals against average: Ilya Bryzgalov (2.48)

The 2010–11 Phoenix Coyotes season was the franchise's 15th season in Phoenix, Arizona, 32nd in the National Hockey League and 39th overall.

== Off-season ==
On June 17, the Coyotes announced their eight-game pre-season schedule, which includes two split-squad games and a game against Dinamo Riga of the Kontinental Hockey League (KHL) in Riga, Latvia.

== Schedule and results ==
=== Pre-season ===
2010 Pre-season game log: 5–2–1 (Home: 2–0–0; Road: 3–2–1)
#	Date	Visitor	Score	Home	OT	Decision	Record	Recap
1	September 21	Phoenix Coyotes	4–1	Anaheim Ducks		LaBarbera	1–0–0
2	September 23	Los Angeles Kings(SS)	1–2	Phoenix Coyotes (SS)	OT	Bryzgalov	2–0–0
3	September 23	Phoenix Coyotes (SS)	3–1	Los Angeles Kings (SS)		Montoya	3–0–0
4	September 25	San Jose Sharks (SS)	1–2	Phoenix Coyotes (SS)		Bryzgalov	4–0–0
5	September 25	Phoenix Coyotes (SS)	1–3	San Jose Sharks (SS)		Climie	4–1–0
6	September 28	Phoenix Coyotes	1–3	Calgary Flames		LaBarbera	4–2–0
7	September 29	Phoenix Coyotes	3–4	Edmonton Oilers	SO	Bryzgalov	4–2–1
8	October 6	Phoenix Coyotes	3–1	Dinamo Riga		LaBarbera	5–2–1
(SS) = Split-squad games.

== Standings ==
Pacific Division
		GP	W	L	OTL	ROW	GF	GA	Pts
**1**	**y-San Jose Sharks**	**82**	**48**	**25**	**9**	**43**	**248**	**213**	**105**
**2**	**Anaheim Ducks**	**82**	**47**	**30**	**5**	**43**	**239**	**235**	**99**
**3**	**Phoenix Coyotes**	**82**	**43**	**26**	**13**	**38**	**231**	**226**	**99**
**4**	**Los Angeles Kings**	**82**	**46**	**30**	**6**	**36**	**219**	**198**	**98**
5	Dallas Stars	82	42	29	11	37	227	233	95

Western Conference
R		Div	GP	W	L	OTL	ROW	GF	GA	Pts
**1**	**p – Vancouver Canucks**	**NW**	**82**	**54**	**19**	**9**	**50**	**262**	**185**	117
**2**	**y – San Jose Sharks**	**PA**	**82**	**48**	**25**	**9**	**43**	**248**	**213**	105
**3**	**y – Detroit Red Wings**	**CE**	**82**	**47**	**25**	**10**	**43**	**261**	**241**	104
**4**	**Anaheim Ducks**	**PA**	**82**	**47**	**30**	**5**	**43**	**239**	**235**	99
**5**	**Nashville Predators**	**CE**	**82**	**44**	**27**	**11**	**38**	**219**	**194**	99
**6**	**Phoenix Coyotes**	**PA**	**82**	**43**	**26**	**13**	**38**	**231**	**226**	99
**7**	**Los Angeles Kings**	**PA**	**82**	**46**	**30**	**6**	**36**	**219**	**198**	98
**8**	**Chicago Blackhawks**	**CE**	**82**	**44**	**29**	**9**	**38**	**258**	**225**	97
8.5
9	Dallas Stars	PA	82	42	29	11	37	227	233	95
10	Calgary Flames	NW	82	41	29	12	32	250	237	94
11	St. Louis Blues	CE	82	38	33	11	34	240	234	87
12	Minnesota Wild	NW	82	39	35	8	36	206	233	86
13	Columbus Blue Jackets	CE	82	34	35	13	29	215	258	81
14	Colorado Avalanche	NW	82	30	44	8	24	227	288	68
15	Edmonton Oilers	NW	82	25	45	12	23	193	269	62

bold – qualified for playoffs; y – Won division; p – Won President's Trophy (best record in NHL)
CE – Central Division, NW – Northwest Division, PA – Pacific Division

== Schedule and results ==
2010–11 Game Log

October: 3–4–3 (Home: 1–2–2; Road: 2–2–1)
#	Date	Visitor	Score	Home	OT	Decision	Attendance	Record	Pts	Recap
1	October 9 (in (Prague, Czech Republic)	Phoenix Coyotes	5–2	Boston Bruins		Bryzgalov	15,299	1–0–0	2
2	October 10 (in Prague, Czech Republic)	Boston Bruins	3–0	Phoenix Coyotes		Bryzgalov	12,990	1–1–0	2
3	October 16	Detroit Red Wings	2–1	Phoenix Coyotes	OT	Bryzgalov	17,125	1–1–1	3
4	October 17	Phoenix Coyotes	2–3	Anaheim Ducks		LaBarbera	13,574	1–2–1	3
5	October 21	Los Angeles Kings	2–4	Phoenix Coyotes		Bryzgalov	6,706	2–2–1	5
6	October 23	Carolina Hurricanes	4–3	Phoenix Coyotes	OT	Bryzgalov	8,189	2–2–2	6
7	October 25	Phoenix Coyotes	2–3	Montreal Canadiens	OT	Bryzgalov	21,273	2–2–3	7
8	October 26	Phoenix Coyotes	2–5	Ottawa Senators		LaBarbera	16,686	2–3–3	7
9	October 28	Phoenix Coyotes	4–2	Detroit Red Wings		Bryzgalov	18,165	3–3–3	9
10	October 30	Tampa Bay Lightning	3–0	Phoenix Coyotes		Bryzgalov	8,171	3–4–3	9

November: 8–3–2 (Home: 4–1–1; Road: 4–2–1)
#	Date	Visitor	Score	Home	OT	Decision	Attendance	Record	Pts	Recap
11	November 3	Nashville Predators	3–4	Phoenix Coyotes		Bryzgalov	6,761	4–4–3	11
12	November 5	Phoenix Coyotes	3–6	Dallas Stars		LaBarbera	12,255	4–5–3	11
13	November 6	Pittsburgh Penguins	4–3	Phoenix Coyotes	SO	Bryzgalov	14,642	4–5–4	12
14	November 8	Phoenix Coyotes	2–3	Detroit Red Wings	OT	Bryzgalov	19,207	4–5–5	13
15	November 10	Phoenix Coyotes	2–1	Chicago Blackhawks		LaBarbera	21,181	5–5–5	15
16	November 12	Calgary Flames	4–5	Phoenix Coyotes		Bryzgalov	11,117	6–5–5	17
17	November 13	St. Louis Blues	3–5	Phoenix Coyotes		Bryzgalov	9,412	7–5–5	19
18	November 17	Phoenix Coyotes	3–1	Calgary Flames		Bryzgalov	19,289	8–5–5	21
19	November 19	Phoenix Coyotes	4–3	Edmonton Oilers	SO	Bryzgalov	16,839	9–5–5	23
20	November 21	Phoenix Coyotes	3–2	Vancouver Canucks		Bryzgalov	18,860	10–5–5	25
21	November 23	Edmonton Oilers	0–5	Phoenix Coyotes		Bryzgalov	9,354	11–5–5	27
22	November 27	Anaheim Ducks	6–4	Phoenix Coyotes		Bryzgalov	12,708	11–6–5	27
23	November 30	Phoenix Coyotes	0–3	Nashville Predators		Bryzgalov	14,333	11–7–5	27

December: 6–6–2 (Home: 2–2–1; Road: 4–4–1)
#	Date	Visitor	Score	Home	OT	Decision	Attendance	Record	Pts	Recap
24	December 1	Phoenix Coyotes	4–2	Minnesota Wild		LaBarbera	17,101	12–7–5	29
25	December 4	Florida Panthers	2–1	Phoenix Coyotes	SO	Bryzgalov	10,334	12–7–6	30
26	December 5	Phoenix Coyotes	3–0	Anaheim Ducks		Bryzgalov	14,062	13–7–6	32
27	December 9	Minnesota Wild	3–2	Phoenix Coyotes		Bryzgalov	7,749	13–8–6	32
28	December 11	Dallas Stars	2–5	Phoenix Coyotes		Bryzgalov	11,410	14–8–6	34
29	December 15	Phoenix Coyotes	0–3	New Jersey Devils		Bryzgalov	13,208	14–9–6	34
30	December 16	Phoenix Coyotes	3–4	New York Rangers	SO	LaBarbera	17,675	14–9–7	35
31	December 18	Phoenix Coyotes	4–3	New York Islanders	SO	LaBarbera	8,433	15–9–7	37
32	December 20	Phoenix Coyotes	1–6	Pittsburgh Penguins		LaBarbera	18,262	15–10–7	37
33	December 23	Phoenix Coyotes	1–4	San Jose Sharks		LaBarbera	17,562	15–11–7	37
34	December 26	Phoenix Coyotes	1–0	Dallas Stars		LaBarbera	17,515	16–11–7	39
35	December 28	Anaheim Ducks	3–1	Phoenix Coyotes		Bryzgalov	14,032	16–12–7	39
36	December 29	Los Angeles Kings	3–6	Phoenix Coyotes		Bryzgalov	15,153	17–12–7	41
37	December 31	Phoenix Coyotes	3–4	St. Louis Blues		Bryzgalov	19,150	17–13–7	41

January: 8–4–2 (Home: 3–4–1; Road: 5–0–1)
#	Date	Visitor	Score	Home	OT	Decision	Attendance	Record	Pts	Recap
38	January 2	Phoenix Coyotes	5–6	Minnesota Wild	OT	LaBarbera	17,240	17–13–8	42
39	January 4	Columbus Blue Jackets	2–4	Phoenix Coyotes		Bryzgalov	8,222	18–13–8	44
40	January 6	Phoenix Coyotes	2–0	Colorado Avalanche		LaBarbera	12,308	19–13–8	46
41	January 8	Buffalo Sabres	2–1	Phoenix Coyotes	OT	LaBarbera	13,905	19–13–9	47
42	January 10	Phoenix Coyotes	4–3	St. Louis Blues		LaBarbera	19,150	20–13–9	49
43	January 11	Phoenix Coyotes	4–3	Columbus Blue Jackets		Bryzgalov	11,109	21–13–9	51
44	January 13	Toronto Maple Leafs	1–5	Phoenix Coyotes		Bryzgalov	11,205	22–13–9	53
45	January 15	Anaheim Ducks	2–6	Phoenix Coyotes		Bryzgalov	10,951	23–13–9	55
46	January 17	San Jose Sharks	4–2	Phoenix Coyotes		Bryzgalov	9,672	23–14–9	55
47	January 18	Nashville Predators	5–2	Phoenix Coyotes		Bryzgalov	8,236	23–15–9	55
48	January 20	Phoenix Coyotes	2–0	Los Angeles Kings		Bryzgalov	18,118	24–15–9	57
49	January 22	Los Angeles Kings	4–3	Phoenix Coyotes		Bryzgalov	13,210	24–16–9	57
50	January 25	Edmonton Oilers	4–3	Phoenix Coyotes		Bryzgalov	10,057	24–17–9	57
51	January 26	Phoenix Coyotes	5–2	Colorado Avalanche		Bryzgalov	13,740	25–17–9	59

February: 8–4–1 (Home: 5–1–0; Road: 3–3–1)
#	Date	Visitor	Score	Home	OT	Decision	Attendance	Record	Pts	Recap
52	February 1	Phoenix Coyotes	3–5	San Jose Sharks		Bryzgalov	17,562	25–18–9	59
53	February 2	Vancouver Canucks	6–0	Phoenix Coyotes		Bryzgalov	13,157	25–19–9	59
54	February 5	Minnesota Wild	0–1	Phoenix Coyotes		Bryzgalov	14,587	26–19–9	61
55	February 7	Colorado Avalanche	0–3	Phoenix Coyotes		Bryzgalov	9,508	27–19–9	63
56	February 9	Phoenix Coyotes	3–2	Dallas Stars	OT	Bryzgalov	11,488	28–19–9	65
57	February 12	Chicago Blackhawks	2–3	Phoenix Coyotes	SO	Bryzgalov	17,283	29–19–9	67
58	February 14	Washington Capitals	2–3	Phoenix Coyotes		Bryzgalov	13,856	30–19–9	69
59	February 17	Atlanta Thrashers	3–4	Phoenix Coyotes		Bryzgalov	10,576	31–19–9	71
60	February 19	Phoenix Coyotes	3–2	Nashville Predators		Bryzgalov	17,113	32–19–9	73
61	February 22	Phoenix Coyotes	3–2	Philadelphia Flyers	OT	Bryzgalov	19,875	33–19–9	75
62	February 23	Phoenix Coyotes	3–8	Tampa Bay Lightning		LaBarbera	15,104	33–20–9	75
63	February 25	Phoenix Coyotes	3–5	Columbus Blue Jackets		Bryzgalov	16,771	33–21–9	75
64	February 27	Phoenix Coyotes	3–4	Chicago Blackhawks	SO	Bryzgalov	21,473	33–21–10	76

March: 9–4–1 (Home: 5–3–1; Road: 4–1–0)
#	Date	Visitor	Score	Home	OT	Decision	Attendance	Record	Pts	Recap
65	March 1	Dallas Stars	3–2	Phoenix Coyotes		Bryzgalov	15,751	33–22–10	76
66	March 3	Phoenix Coyotes	0–1	Los Angeles Kings		Bryzgalov	18,118	33–23–10	76
67	March 5	Detroit Red Wings	4–5	Phoenix Coyotes	SO	Bryzgalov	17,382	34–23–10	78
68	March 8	Vancouver Canucks	4–3	Phoenix Coyotes	OT	Bryzgalov	12,843	34–23–11	79
69	March 10	Calgary Flames	0–3	Phoenix Coyotes		Bryzgalov	13,003	35–23–11	81
70	March 13	Phoenix Coyotes	5–2	Anaheim Ducks		Bryzgalov	14,326	36–23–11	83
71	March 15	Phoenix Coyotes	4–3	Calgary Flames		Bryzgalov	19,289	37–23–11	85
72	March 17	Phoenix Coyotes	3–1	Edmonton Oilers		Bryzgalov	16,839	38–23–11	87
73	March 18	Phoenix Coyotes	3–1	Vancouver Canucks		LaBarbera	18,860	39–23–11	89
74	March 20	Chicago Blackhawks	2–1	Phoenix Coyotes		Bryzgalov	17,328	39–24–11	89
75	March 22	St. Louis Blues	1–2	Phoenix Coyotes		Bryzgalov	10,977	40–24–11	91
76	March 24	Columbus Blue Jackets	0–3	Phoenix Coyotes		Bryzgalov	11,172	41–24–11	93
77	March 26	San Jose Sharks	4–1	Phoenix Coyotes		Bryzgalov	16,394	41–25–11	93
78	March 29	Dallas Stars	1–2	Phoenix Coyotes	SO	Bryzgalov	12,541	42–25–11	95

April: 1–1–2 (Home: 1–0–1; Road: 0–1–1)
#	Date	Visitor	Score	Home	OT	Decision	Attendance	Record	Pts	Recap
79	April 1	Colorado Avalanche	4–3	Phoenix Coyotes	SO	Bryzgalov	15,739	42–25–12	96
80	April 6	Phoenix Coyotes	2–3	Los Angeles Kings	SO	Bryzgalov	18,118	42–25–13	97
81	April 8	San Jose Sharks	3–4	Phoenix Coyotes		Bryzgalov	17,125	43–25–13	99
82	April 9	Phoenix Coyotes	1–3	San Jose Sharks		Bryzgalov	17,562	43–26–13	99

Legend: Win (2 points) Loss (0 points) Overtime/shootout loss (1 point)

== Playoffs ==
On April 8, 2011, the Coyotes clinched their second consecutive Stanley Cup playoff berth with a 4–3 victory over the San Jose Sharks at Jobing.com Arena. It was the first time since the 1999–2000 season that the Coyotes have gone to the post-season two consecutive years. The Coyotes faced the Detroit Red Wings in the first round for the second consecutive year. Just before the start of the playoffs, news started to spread that when the Coyotes were eliminated from the playoffs, that the announcement would be made that the team would be moving to Winnipeg for the next season. The Coyotes players and coaching staff refused to use this distraction as an excuse.

Key: Win Loss

2011 Stanley Cup Playoffs

Western Conference Quarter-finals: vs. (3) Detroit Red Wings – Detroit won series 4–0
#	Date	Visitor	Score	Home	OT	Decision	Attendance	Series	Recap
1	April 13	Phoenix Coyotes	2–4	Detroit Red Wings		Bryzgalov	20,066	Red Wings lead 1–0
2	April 16	Phoenix Coyotes	3–4	Detroit Red Wings		Bryzgalov	20,066	Red Wings lead 2–0
3	April 18	Detroit Red Wings	4–2	Phoenix Coyotes		Bryzgalov	17,130	Red Wings lead 3–0
4	April 20	Detroit Red Wings	6–3	Phoenix Coyotes		Bryzgalov	17,314	Red Wings win 4–0

== Player statistics ==
=== Skaters ===
Regular season

Player	GP	G	A	Pts	+/−	PIM
Shane Doan	72	20	40	60	5	67
Keith Yandle	82	11	48	59	12	68
Ray Whitney	75	17	40	57	0	24
Radim Vrbata	79	19	29	48	5	20
Eric Belanger	82	13	27	40	11	36
Lauri Korpikoski	79	19	21	40	17	20
Lee Stempniak	82	19	19	38	4	19
Taylor Pyatt	76	18	13	31	11	27
Scottie Upshall^{‡}	61	16	11	27	5	42
Martin Hanzal	61	16	10	26	4	54
Kyle Turris	65	11	14	25	0	16
Adrian Aucoin	75	3	19	22	18	52
Vernon Fiddler	71	6	16	22	3	46
Derek Morris	77	5	11	16	−2	58
Wojtek Wolski^{‡}	36	6	10	16	−6	10
Ed Jovanovski	50	5	9	14	4	39
David Schlemko	43	4	10	14	8	24
Mikkel Boedker	34	4	10	14	11	8
Oliver Ekman-Larsson	48	1	10	11	3	24
Sami Lepisto^{‡}	51	4	7	11	7	37
Michal Rozsival^{†}	33	3	3	6	3	20
Andrew Ebbett	33	2	3	5	−1	4
Brett MacLean	13	2	1	3	0	2
Nolan Yonkman	16	0	1	1	5	39
Petr Prucha	11	0	1	1	0	4
Paul Bissonnette	48	1	0	1	6	71
Rostislav Klesla^{†}	16	1	0	1	−6	12
Ryan Hollweg	3	0	0	0	−1	0
Garrett Stafford	2	0	0	0	0	0
Chris Summers	2	0	0	0	−3	4

Playoffs

Player	GP	G	A	Pts	+/−	PIM
Shane Doan	4	3	2	5	−2	6
Radim Vrbata	4	2	3	5	−5	0
Keith Yandle	4	0	5	5	−5	0
Ray Whitney	4	1	2	3	0	2
Martin Hanzal	4	1	2	3	−6	8
Kyle Turris	4	1	2	3	1	2
Ed Jovanovski	4	0	1	1	−2	2
Taylor Pyatt	4	1	0	1	−3	0
Lauri Korpikoski	4	0	1	1	−6	2
David Schlemko	4	1	0	1	−3	4
Mikkel Boedker	4	0	1	1	−1	2
Adrian Aucoin	4	0	0	0	−4	2
Eric Belanger	4	0	0	0	−4	2
Michal Rozsival	4	0	0	0	−3	2
Rostislav Klesla	4	0	0	0	−2	7
Vernon Fiddler	4	0	0	0	−2	0
Paul Bissonnette	1	0	0	0	0	0
Lee Stempniak	4	0	0	0	−3	0
Andrew Ebbett	3	0	0	0	−1	0

=== Goaltenders ===
Regular season

Player	GP	Min	W	L	OTL	GA	GAA	SA	Sv%	SO	G	A	PIM
Ilya Bryzgalov	68	4060	36	20	10	168	2.48	2125	.921	7	0	0	2
Jason LaBarbera	17	883	7	6	3	48	3.26	529	.909	2	0	0	2
Matt Climie	1	32	0	0	0	1	1.88	16	.938	0	0	0	0

Playoffs

Player	GP	Min	W	L	GA	GAA	SA	Sv%	SO	G	A	PIM
Ilya Bryzgalov	4	234	0	4	17	4.36	140	.879	0	0	0	0

^{†}Denotes player spent time with another team before joining Coyotes. Stats reflect time with the Coyotes only.
^{‡}Traded mid-season.
Bold/italics denotes franchise record.

Note:

Pos = Position;GP = Games played; G = Goals; A = Assists; Pts = Points; PIM = Penalty minutes; +/- = Plus/minus; PPG = Power-play goals; SHG = Short-handed goals; GWG = Game-winning goals
Pos = Position;GP = Games played; Min, TOI = Minutes played; W = Wins; L = Losses; T,T/OT = Ties; OTL = Overtime losses; GA = Goals-against; GAA = Goals-against average; SO = Shutouts; SA = Shots against; SV = Shots saved;SV% = Save percentage;

== Awards and records ==
=== Records ===
Player	Record (Amount)	Achieved
Shane Doan	Most games played in franchise history (1,099)	February 23, 2011

=== Milestones ===
Regular season
Player	Milestone	Reached
Eric Belanger	300th Career NHL Point	October 9, 2010
Oliver Ekman-Larsson	1st Career NHL Game	October 9, 2010
Martin Hanzal	100th Career NHL Point	October 16, 2010
Oliver Ekman-Larsson	1st Career NHL Assist; 1st Career NHL Point	October 23, 2010
Lee Stempniak	100th Career NHL Goal	November 3, 2010
Vernon Fiddler	400th Career NHL Game	November 19, 2010
Scottie Upshall	300th Career NHL Game	November 23, 2010
Lee Stempniak	400th Career NHL Game	December 5, 2010
Keith Yandle	100th Career NHL Point	December 9, 2010
Ray Whitney	1,100th Career NHL Game	December 16, 2010
Sami Lepisto	100th Career NHL Game	December 23, 2010
Ed Jovanovski	1,000th Career NHL Game	December 26, 2010
Derek Morris	900th Career NHL Game	December 26, 2010
Brett MacLean	1st Career NHL Game; 1st Career NHL Goal; 1st Career NHL Point	December 29, 2010
Shane Doan	700th Career NHL Point	December 31, 2010
Kyle Turris	100th Career NHL Game	January 13, 2011
Radim Vrbata	300th Career NHL Point	January 15, 2011
Ray Whitney	900th Career NHL Point	January 15, 2011
Oliver Ekman-Larsson	1st Career NHL Goal	January 17, 2011
Mikkel Boedker	100th Career NHL Game	January 20, 2011
Chris Summers	1st Career NHL Game	January 20, 2011
Keith Yandle	100th Career NHL Assist	January 26, 2011
Shane Doan	1,000th Career NHL PIM	February 1, 2011
Ilya Bryzgalov	300th Career NHL Game	February 5, 2011
Lauri Korpikoski	200th Career NHL Game	February 22, 2011
Shane Doan	1,100th Career NHL Game	February 25, 2011
Eric Belanger	700th Career NHL Game	March 3, 2011
Brett MacLean	1st Career NHL Assist	March 5, 2011
Eric Belanger	200th Career NHL Assist	March 18, 2011
Adrian Aucoin	1,000th Career NHL Game	March 20, 2011
Paul Bissonnette	100th Career NHL Game	March 26, 2011
Derek Morris	300th Career NHL Assist	March 26, 2011
Michal Rozsival	700th Career NHL Game	April 6, 2011
Radim Vrbata	600th Career NHL Game	April 8, 2011

Playoffs
Player	Milestone	Reached
Mikkel Boedker	1st Career NHL Playoff Game	April 13, 2011
David Schlemko	1st Career NHL Playoff Game	April 13, 2011
Kyle Turris	1st Career NHL Playoff Game; 1st Career NHL Playoff Goal; 1st Career NHL Playoff Point	April 13, 2011
Mikkel Boedker	1st Career NHL Playoff Assist; 1st Career NHL Playoff Point	April 18, 2011
David Schlemko	1st Career NHL Playoff Goal; 1st Career NHL Playoff Point	April 18, 2011
Kyle Turris	1st Career NHL Playoff Assist	April 18, 2011
Paul Bissonnette	1st Career NHL Playoff Game	April 20, 2011
Martin Hanzal	1st Career NHL Playoff Goal	April 20, 2011

=== Awards ===
Regular Season
Player	Award	Awarded
Shane Doan	NHL Second Star of the Week	January 3, 2011
Ilya Bryzgalov	NHL Third Star of the Week	January 17, 2011
Keith Yandle	NHL Second Star of the Month	January 2011
Ilya Bryzgalov	NHL Third Star of the Week	February 14, 2011

== Transactions ==
On December 16, 2010, Tom Fenton, a former college goaltender, was signed to a one-day amateur contract as an emergency backup to Jason LaBarbera after Ilya Bryzgalov became ill and could not play. He is a graduate student and a hockey coach at Manhattanville College, and had not played regularly since 2009 at American International College. His uniform number was 35, but he used his college mask with his college number, 30.

The Coyotes have been involved in the following transactions during the 2010–11 season.

=== Trades ===
Date	Details
May 13, 2010	To Carolina Hurricanes Jared Staal	To Phoenix Coyotes 5th-round pick in 2010 – Luke Walker
June 25, 2010	To Montreal Canadiens 1st-round pick (22nd overall) in 2010 – Jarred Tinordi; 4th-round pick in 2010 – Mark Macmillan	To Phoenix Coyotes 1st-round pick (27th overall) in 2010 – Mark Visentin; 2nd-round pick in 2010 – Oscar Lindberg
June 28, 2010	To Colorado Avalanche Daniel Winnik	To Phoenix Coyotes 4th-round pick in 2012 – Rhett Holland
June 30, 2010	To Edmonton Oilers Jim Vandermeer	To Phoenix Coyotes Patrick O'Sullivan
January 10, 2011	To New York Rangers Wojtek Wolski	To Phoenix Coyotes Michal Rozsival
February 9, 2011	To New York Islanders Al Montoya	To Phoenix Coyotes 6th-round pick in 2011 – Andrew Fritsch
February 28, 2011	To Columbus Blue Jackets Scottie Upshall; Sami Lepisto	To Phoenix Coyotes Rostislav Klesla; Dane Byers

=== Free agents acquired ===
Player	Former team	Contract terms
Ray Whitney	Carolina Hurricanes	2 years, $6 million
Andrew Ebbett	Minnesota Wild	1 year, $500,000
Mathieu Beaudoin	Texas Stars	1 year, $500,000
Garrett Stafford	Texas Stars	2 years, $1.2 million
Nolan Yonkman	Milwaukee Admirals	1 year, $550,000
Matt Climie	Dallas Stars	1 year, $725,000
Bracken Kearns	Rockford IceHogs	1 year, $550,000
Eric Belanger	Washington Capitals	1 year, $750,000
Tom Fenton	Manhattanville College	1 day, emergency contract
Andy Miele	Miami University	2 years, $1.8 million entry-level contract

=== Free agents lost ===
Player	New team	Contract terms
Petteri Nokelainen	Jokerit	2 years
Zbynek Michalek	Pittsburgh Penguins	5 years, $20 million
Matthew Lombardi	Nashville Predators	3 years, $10.5 million
Joel Perrault	Vancouver Canucks	1 year, $510,000
Stefan Meyer	Calgary Flames	2 years, $1.025 million
Jeff Hoggan	Grizzly Adams Wolfsburg	1 year
Patrick O'Sullivan	Carolina Hurricanes	1 year, $600,000

=== Claimed via waivers ===
Player	Former team	Date claimed off waivers

=== Lost via waivers ===
Player	New team	Date claimed off waivers

=== Player signings ===
Player	Contract terms
Maxim Goncharov	3 years, $2.325 million entry-level contract
Oliver Ekman-Larsson	3 years, $2.7 million entry-level contract
Scottie Upshall	1 year, $2.25 million
David Schlemko	3 years, $1.65 million
Ryan Hollweg	1 year, $500,000
Adrian Aucoin	2 years, $4 million
Taylor Pyatt	2 years, $2 million
Wojtek Wolski	2 years, $7.6 million
Derek Morris	4 years, $11 million
Sami Lepisto	1 year, $800,000
Al Montoya	1 year, $750,000
Alexandre Picard	1 year, $868,219
Lee Stempniak	2 years, $3.8 million
Martin Hanzal	2 years, $3.6 million
Brandon Gormley	3 years, $4.125 million entry-level contract
Mark Visentin	3 years, $2.7 million entry-level contract
Brett Hextall	2 years, $1.4 million entry-level contract

== Draft picks ==
Phoenix's picks at the 2010 NHL entry draft in Los Angeles, California.

Round	#	Player	Position	Nationality	College/junior/club team (league)
1	13 (from Calgary)	Brandon Gormley	D	Canada	Moncton Wildcats (QMJHL)
1	27 (from Montreal)	Mark Visentin	G	Canada	Niagara IceDogs (OHL)
2	52	Philip Lane	RW	United States	Brampton Battalion (OHL)
2	57 (from Montreal)	Oscar Lindberg	C	Sweden	Skellefteå AIK (Elitserien)
5	138 (from Nashville via Carolina)	Louis Domingue	G	Canada	Quebec Remparts (QMJHL)

== See also ==
- 2010–11 NHL season

== Farm teams ==
San Antonio Rampage

The San Antonio Rampage are the Coyotes American Hockey League affiliate in 2010–11.

Las Vegas Wranglers

The Las Vegas Wranglers are the Coyotes ECHL affiliate in 2010–11.

Arizona Sundogs

On October 13, 2010, the Coyotes and Sundogs signed an affiliate agreement for the Coyotes to place players with the Sundogs. The Arizona Sundogs are members of the Central Hockey League.
