= 2010–11 Nashville Predators season =

Professional ice hockey team season

2010–11 Nashville Predators
- Division: 2nd Central
- Conference: 5th Western
- 2010–11 record: 44–27–11
- Home record: 24–9–8
- Road record: 20–18–3
- Goals for: 219
- Goals against: 194

Team information
- General manager: David Poile
- Coach: Barry Trotz
- Captain: Shea Weber
- Alternate captains: Steve Sullivan; Ryan Suter
- Arena: Bridgestone Arena

Team leaders
- Goals: Sergei Kostitsyn (23)
- Assists: Ryan Suter (35)
- Points: Martin Erat; Kostitsyn (50)
- Penalty minutes: Shane O'Brien (83)
- Plus/minus: Ryan Suter (+20)
- Wins: Pekka Rinne (33)
- Goals against average: Rinne (2.12)

The 2010–11 Nashville Predators season was the team's 13th season in the National Hockey League (NHL). They were defeated by the Vancouver Canucks in the second round of the Stanley Cup playoffs.

== Pre-season ==
With their 18th-overall first-round pick, the Predators chose Austin Watson of the Peterborough Petes.

== Regular season ==
The Predators opened the season on October 9 at home against the Anaheim Ducks. The regular season ended on April 9, with their final game being against the St. Louis Blues.

== Playoffs ==
The Predators clinched a berth in the 2011 Stanley Cup playoffs as the Western Conference's fifth seed. The Predators won their first playoff series in franchise history after defeating the Anaheim Ducks in six games to advance to the Western Conference Semifinals against the first seed, the Vancouver Canucks. In a low-scoring series, the Canucks managed to close out the Predators at Bridgestone Arena in six games.

== Standings ==
Central Division
		GP	W	L	OTL	ROW	GF	GA	Pts
**1**	**y-Detroit Red Wings**	**82**	**47**	**25**	**10**	**43**	**261**	**241**	**104**
**2**	**Nashville Predators**	**82**	**44**	**27**	**11**	**38**	**219**	**194**	**99**
**3**	**Chicago Blackhawks**	**82**	**44**	**29**	**9**	**38**	**258**	**225**	**97**
4	St. Louis Blues	82	38	33	11	34	240	234	87
5	Columbus Blue Jackets	82	34	35	13	29	215	258	81

Western Conference
R		Div	GP	W	L	OTL	ROW	GF	GA	Pts
**1**	**p – Vancouver Canucks**	**NW**	**82**	**54**	**19**	**9**	**50**	**262**	**185**	117
**2**	**y – San Jose Sharks**	**PA**	**82**	**48**	**25**	**9**	**43**	**248**	**213**	105
**3**	**y – Detroit Red Wings**	**CE**	**82**	**47**	**25**	**10**	**43**	**261**	**241**	104
**4**	**Anaheim Ducks**	**PA**	**82**	**47**	**30**	**5**	**43**	**239**	**235**	99
**5**	**Nashville Predators**	**CE**	**82**	**44**	**27**	**11**	**38**	**219**	**194**	99
**6**	**Phoenix Coyotes**	**PA**	**82**	**43**	**26**	**13**	**38**	**231**	**226**	99
**7**	**Los Angeles Kings**	**PA**	**82**	**46**	**30**	**6**	**36**	**219**	**198**	98
**8**	**Chicago Blackhawks**	**CE**	**82**	**44**	**29**	**9**	**38**	**258**	**225**	97
8.5
9	Dallas Stars	PA	82	42	29	11	37	227	233	95
10	Calgary Flames	NW	82	41	29	12	32	250	237	94
11	St. Louis Blues	CE	82	38	33	11	34	240	234	87
12	Minnesota Wild	NW	82	39	35	8	36	206	233	86
13	Columbus Blue Jackets	CE	82	34	35	13	29	215	258	81
14	Colorado Avalanche	NW	82	30	44	8	24	227	288	68
15	Edmonton Oilers	NW	82	25	45	12	23	193	269	62

bold – qualified for playoffs; y – Won division; p – Won President's Trophy (best record in NHL)
CE – Central Division, NW – Northwest Division, PA – Pacific Division

== Schedule and results ==
=== Pre-season ===
2010 Pre-season record: 4–2–0 (home: 1–2–0; road: 3–0–0)
#	Date	Visitor	Score	Home	OT	Decision	Record	Recap
1	September 23	Carolina Hurricanes	3–1	Nashville Predators		Dekanich	0–1–0
2	September 24	Nashville Predators	2–1	Carolina Hurricanes		Lindback	1–1–0
3	September 25	Washington Capitals	2–1	Nashville Predators		Lindback	1–2–0
4	September 27	Atlanta Thrashers	1–2	Nashville Predators		Rinne	2–2–0
5	September 29	Nashville Predators	4–3	Atlanta Thrashers		Lindback	3–2–0
6	October 3	Nashville Predators	3–0	Washington Capitals		Rinne	4–2–0

=== Regular season ===
2010–11 game log

October: 5–2–3 (home: 2–1–3; road: 3–1–0) Pts. 13
#	Date	Visitor	Score	Home	OT	Decision	Attendance	Record	Pts	Recap
1	October 9	Anaheim Ducks	1–4	Nashville Predators		Rinne	17,113	1–0–0	2
2	October 13	Nashville Predators	3–2	Chicago Blackhawks		Lindback	20,680	2–0–0	4
3	October 14	St. Louis Blues	3–4	Nashville Predators		Lindback	15,103	3–0–0	6
4	October 16	Washington Capitals	3–2	Nashville Predators	OT	Lindback	16,144	3–0–1	7
5	October 19	Calgary Flames	1–0	Nashville Predators	OT	Rinne	15,684	3–0–2	8
6	October 21	Pittsburgh Penguins	4–3	Nashville Predators	OT	Rinne	17,113	3–0–3	9
7	October 23	Nashville Predators	1–0	Dallas Stars		Rinne	13,583	4–0–3	11
8	October 24	Nashville Predators	4–3	Tampa Bay Lightning		Lindback	14,453	5–0–3	13
9	October 28	St. Louis Blues	3–0	Nashville Predators		Rinne	15,506	5–1–3	13
10	October 30	Nashville Predators	2–5	Detroit Red Wings		Rinne	18,711	5–2–3	13

November: 5–6–2 (home: 2–0–2; road: 3–6–0) Pts. 12
#	Date	Visitor	Score	Home	OT	Decision	Attendance	Record	Pts	Recap
11	November 3	Nashville Predators	3–4	Phoenix Coyotes		Rinne	6,761	5–3–3	13
12	November 6	Nashville Predators	1–4	Los Angeles Kings		Rinne	18,118	5–4–3	13
13	November 7	Nashville Predators	4–5	Anaheim Ducks		Lindback	13,520	5–5–3	13
14	November 11	Nashville Predators	3–2	St. Louis Blues	SO	Rinne	19,150	6–5–3	15
15	November 13	Chicago Blackhawks	3–4	Nashville Predators	SO	Rinne	17,113	7–5–3	17
16	November 16	Nashville Predators	4–5	Toronto Maple Leafs		Rinne	19,069	7–6–3	17
17	November 18	Nashville Predators	3–0	Montreal Canadiens		Rinne	21,273	8–6–3	19
18	November 20	Nashville Predators	2–1	Carolina Hurricanes	SO	Rinne	15,384	9–6–3	21
19	November 22	Nashville Predators	0–2	Columbus Blue Jackets		Rinne	10,095	9–7–3	21
20	November 24	St. Louis Blues	2–1	Nashville Predators	SO	Rinne	16,603	9–7–4	22
21	November 26	Nashville Predators	2–5	Minnesota Wild		Lindback	17,814	9–8–4	22
22	November 27	New York Rangers	2–1	Nashville Predators	SO	Rinne	17,113	9–8–5	23
23	November 30	Phoenix Coyotes	0–3	Nashville Predators		Rinne	14,333	10–8–5	25

December: 8–5–1 (home: 4–3–0; road: 4–2–1) Pts. 17
#	Date	Visitor	Score	Home	OT	Decision	Attendance	Record	Pts	Recap
24	December 1	Nashville Predators	4–3	Columbus Blue Jackets	SO	Rinne	9,892	11–8–5	27
25	December 4	Carolina Hurricanes	2–5	Nashville Predators		Lindback	15,016	12–8–5	29
26	December 6	Nashville Predators	2–3	Atlanta Thrashers	OT	Lindback	10,024	12–8–6	30
27	December 8	Nashville Predators	3–2	Detroit Red Wings		Lindback	17,359	13–8–6	32
28	December 11	Florida Panthers	0–3	Nashville Predators		Lindback	16,128	14–8–6	34
29	December 13	New York Islanders	0–5	Nashville Predators		Lindback	14,314	15–8–6	36
30	December 15	San Jose Sharks	2–3	Nashville Predators		Lindback	14,731	16–8–6	38
31	December 17	Nashville Predators	3–1	New Jersey Devils		Lindback	14,137	17–8–6	40
32	December 18	Los Angeles Kings	6–1	Nashville Predators		Dekanich	16,734	17–9–6	40
33	December 22	Nashville Predators	1–4	Chicago Blackhawks		Lindback	21,526	17–10–6	40
34	December 23	Ottawa Senators	2–1	Nashville Predators		Rinne	17,113	17–11–6	40
35	December 26	Nashville Predators	0–2	St. Louis Blues		Rinne	19,150	17–12–6	40
36	December 28	Dallas Stars	4–2	Nashville Predators		Rinne	17,113	17–13–6	40
37	December 31	Nashville Predators	4–1	Minnesota Wild		Rinne	18,285	18–13–6	42

January: 9–4–0 (home: 3–0–0; road: 6–4–0) Pts. 18
#	Date	Visitor	Score	Home	OT	Decision	Attendance	Record	Pts	Recap
38	January 2	Columbus Blue Jackets	1–4	Nashville Predators		Rinne	14,593	19–13–6	44
39	January 5	Nashville Predators	4–1	Anaheim Ducks		Rinne	12,216	20–13–6	46
40	January 6	Nashville Predators	5–2	Los Angeles Kings		Lindback	17,823	21–13–6	48
41	January 8	Nashville Predators	2–1	San Jose Sharks		Rinne	17,562	22–13–6	50
42	January 11	Minnesota Wild	1–5	Nashville Predators		Rinne	15,311	23–13–6	52
43	January 13	Nashville Predators	2–3	Florida Panthers		Rinne	12,228	23–14–6	52
44	January 15	Chicago Blackhawks	2–3	Nashville Predators	SO	Rinne	17,113	24–14–6	54
45	January 16	Nashville Predators	3–6	Chicago Blackhawks		Lindback	21,387	24–15–6	54
46	January 18	Nashville Predators	5–2	Phoenix Coyotes		Rinne	8,236	25–15–6	56
47	January 20	Nashville Predators	5–1	Colorado Avalanche		Rinne	12,638	26–15–6	58
48	January 23	Nashville Predators	3–2	Edmonton Oilers	SO	Rinne	16,839	27–15–6	60
49	January 24	Nashville Predators	1–3	Calgary Flames		Rinne	19,289	27–16–6	60
50	January 26	Nashville Predators	1–2	Vancouver Canucks		Rinne	18,860	27–17–6	60

February: 5–6–2 (home: 4–3–2; road: 1–3–0) Pts. 12
#	Date	Visitor	Score	Home	OT	Decision	Attendance	Record	Pts	Recap
51	February 1	Calgary Flames	3–2	Nashville Predators	SO	Rinne	18,860	27–17–7	61
52	February 3	Nashville Predators	2–3	Philadelphia Flyers		Lindback	19,702	27–18–7	61
53	February 5	Detroit Red Wings	0–3	Nashville Predators		Rinne	17,113	28–18–7	63
54	February 7	Edmonton Oilers	4–0	Nashville Predators		Rinne	14,388	28–19–7	63
55	February 9	Nashville Predators	4–1	Detroit Red Wings		Rinne	20,066	29–19–7	65
56	February 12	Colorado Avalanche	3–5	Nashville Predators		Rinne	17,113	30–19–7	67
57	February 15	San Jose Sharks	2–1	Nashville Predators	OT	Rinne	14,132	30–19–8	68
58	February 17	Vancouver Canucks	1–3	Nashville Predators		Rinne	15,337	31–19–8	70
59	February 19	Phoenix Coyotes	3–2	Nashville Predators		Rinne	17,113	31–20–8	70
60	February 22	Nashville Predators	0–4	Columbus Blue Jackets		Rinne	12,457	31–21–8	70
61	February 24	Chicago Blackhawks	3–0	Nashville Predators		Rinne	17,113	31–22–8	70
62	February 26	Nashville Predators	2–3	Dallas Stars		Rinne	15,860	31–23–8	70
63	February 27	Columbus Blue Jackets	2–3	Nashville Predators		Rinne	16,340	32–23–8	72

March: 10–3–2 (home: 7–2–0; road: 3–1–2) Pts. 22
#	Date	Visitor	Score	Home	OT	Decision	Attendance	Record	Pts	Recap
64	March 1	Nashville Predators	1–2	Edmonton Oilers	SO	Rinne	16,839	32–23–9	73
65	March 3	Nashville Predators	3–0	Vancouver Canucks		Rinne	18,860	33–23–9	75
66	March 6	Nashville Predators	2–3	Calgary Flames		Rinne	19,289	33–24–9	75
67	March 8	Nashville Predators	2–3	San Jose Sharks	OT	Rinne	17,562	33–24–10	76
68	March 10	Minnesota Wild	0–4	Nashville Predators		Rinne	15,343	34–24–10	78
69	March 12	Colorado Avalanche	2–4	Nashville Predators		Rinne	17,113	35–24–10	80
70	March 15	Los Angeles Kings	4–2	Nashville Predators		Rinne	15,761	35–25–10	80
71	March 17	Boston Bruins	3–4	Nashville Predators	OT	Rinne	16,839	36–25–10	82
72	March 19	Detroit Red Wings	1–3	Nashville Predators		Rinne	17,113	37–25–10	84
73	March 20	Nashville Predators	4–3	Buffalo Sabres	OT	Lindback	18,690	38–25–10	86
74	March 22	Edmonton Oilers	1–3	Nashville Predators		Rinne	15,745	39–25–10	88
75	March 24	Anaheim Ducks	4–5	Nashville Predators		Rinne	17,113	40–25–10	90
76	March 26	Dallas Stars	2–4	Nashville Predators		Rinne	16,892	41–25–10	92
77	March 29	Vancouver Canucks	3–1	Nashville Predators		Rinne	15,960	41–26–10	92
78	March 31	Nashville Predators	3–2	Colorado Avalanche		Rinne	13,239	42–26–10	94

April: 2–1–1 (home: 2–0–1; road: 0–1–0) Pts. 5
#	Date	Visitor	Score	Home	OT	Decision	Attendance	Record	Pts	Recap
79	April 2	Detroit Red Wings	4–3	Nashville Predators	OT	Rinne	17,113	42–26–11	95
80	April 5	Atlanta Thrashers	3–6	Nashville Predators		Rinne	16,756	43–26–11	97
81	April 8	Columbus Blue Jackets	1–4	Nashville Predators		Rinne	17,113	44–26–11	99
82	April 9	Nashville Predators	0–2	St. Louis Blues		Rinne	19,150	44–27–11	99

Legend: Win (2 points) Loss (0 points) Overtime/shootout loss (1 point)

== Playoffs ==
The Nashville Predators ended the 2010–11 regular season as the Western Conference's fifth seed. They defeated the fourth seed, the Anaheim Ducks, in the first round, 4–2, which is the first playoff series win in franchise history. Their opponent in the Western Conference Semifinals would be the Vancouver Canucks, who beat Nashville 4–2.

2011 Stanley Cup playoffs

Western Conference Quarter-final vs. (4) Anaheim Ducks – Nashville won series 4–2
Game	Date	Opponent	Score	OT	Decision	Arena	Attendance	Series	Recap
1	April 13	@ Anaheim Ducks	4–1		Rinne	Honda Center	17,174	1–0
2	April 15	@ Anaheim Ducks	3–5		Rinne	Honda Center	17,174	1–1
3	April 17	Anaheim Ducks	4–3		Rinne	Bridgestone Arena	17,113	2–1
4	April 20	Anaheim Ducks	3–6		Rinne	Bridgestone Arena	17,113	2–2
5	April 22	@ Anaheim Ducks	4–3	OT	Rinne	Honda Center	17,385	3–2
6	April 24	Anaheim Ducks	4–2		Rinne	Bridgestone Arena	17,113	4–2

Western Conference Semi-final vs. (1) Vancouver Canucks – Vancouver won series 4–2
Game	Date	Opponent	Score	OT	Decision	Arena	Attendance	Series	Recap
1	April 28	@ Vancouver Canucks	0–1		Rinne	Rogers Arena	18,860	0–1
2	April 30	@ Vancouver Canucks	2–1	2OT	Rinne	Rogers Arena	18,860	1–1
3	May 3	Vancouver Canucks	2–3	OT	Rinne	Bridgestone Arena	17,113	1–2
4	May 5	Vancouver Canucks	2–4		Rinne	Bridgestone Arena	17,113	1–3
5	May 7	@ Vancouver Canucks	4–3		Rinne	Rogers Arena	18,860	2–3
6	May 9	Vancouver Canucks	1–2		Rinne	Bridgestone Arena	17,113	2–4

== Player stats ==
=== Skaters ===
Note: GP = Games played; G = Goals; A = Assists; Pts = Points; +/− = Plus/minus; PIM = Penalty minutes

Regular season

Player	GP	G	A	Pts	+/−	PIM
Martin Erat	64	17	33	50	14	22
Sergei Kostitsyn	77	23	27	50	10	20
Shea Weber	82	16	32	48	7	56
Patric Hornqvist	79	21	27	48	11	47
David Legwand	64	17	24	41	13	24
Ryan Suter	70	4	35	39	20	54
Colin Wilson	82	16	18	34	9	17
Joel Ward	80	10	19	29	−1	42
Cody Franson	80	8	21	29	10	30
Marcel Goc	51	9	15	24	10	6
Steve Sullivan	44	10	12	22	4	28
Jordin Tootoo	54	8	10	18	8	61
Kevin Klein	81	2	16	18	9	24
Cal O'Reilly	38	6	12	18	4	2
Nick Spaling	74	8	6	14	−10	20
Jerred Smithson	82	5	8	13	−6	34
Matthew Halischuk	27	4	8	12	5	2
Mike Fisher^{†}	27	5	7	12	2	10
Francis Bouillon	44	1	9	10	−3	27
Shane O'Brien	80	2	7	9	1	83
Blake Geoffrion	20	6	2	8	3	7
Jonathon Blum	23	3	5	8	8	8
Alexander Sulzer^{‡}	31	1	3	4	−5	14
Chris Mueller	15	0	3	3	0	2
Marek Svatos^{‡}	9	1	2	3	1	2
Matthew Lombardi	2	0	0	0	−1	0
Wade Belak	15	0	0	0	−1	18
Steve Begin	2	0	0	0	−2	4
Teemu Laakso	1	0	0	0	0	0
Andreas Thuresson	3	0	0	0	−1	2
Linus Klasen	4	0	0	0	−3	0

Playoffs

Player	GP	G	A	Pts	+/−	PIM
Joel Ward	12	7	6	13	4	6
David Legwand	12	6	3	9	1	8
Mike Fisher	12	3	4	7	−1	11
Martin Erat	10	1	5	6	0	6
Jordin Tootoo	12	1	5	6	4	28
Ryan Suter	12	1	5	6	2	6
Cody Franson	12	1	5	6	0	0
Nick Spaling	12	2	4	6	3	0
Shea Weber	12	3	2	5	3	8
Sergei Kostitsyn	12	0	5	5	0	2
Steve Sullivan	9	2	1	3	2	2
Kevin Klein	12	1	2	3	3	6
Patric Hornqvist	12	2	1	3	−2	6
Jerred Smithson	11	1	1	2	2	8
Blake Geoffrion	12	0	2	2	1	4
Matthew Halischuk	12	2	0	2	−1	0
Jonathon Blum	12	0	2	2	2	0
J. P. Dumont	3	0	1	1	−1	2
Shane O'Brien	12	0	0	0	−2	18
Colin Wilson	3	0	0	0	−1	0

=== Goaltenders ===
Note: GP = Games played; TOI = Time on ice (minutes); W = Wins; L = Losses; OT = Overtime losses; GA = Goals against; GAA= Goals against average; SA= Shots against; SV= Saves; Sv% = Save percentage; SO= Shutouts

Regular season

Player	GP	TOI	W	L	OT	GA	GAA	SA	Sv%	SO	G	A	PIM
Pekka Rinne	64	3789	33	22	9	134	2.12	1905	.930	6	0	0	12
Anders Lindback	22	1131	11	5	2	49	2.60	576	.915	2	0	0	0
Mark Dekanich	1	50	0	0	0	3	3.60	25	.880	0	0	0	0

Playoffs

Player	GP	TOI	W	L	GA	GAA	SA	Sv%	SO	G	A	PIM
Pekka Rinne	12	748	6	6	32	2.57	343	.907	0	0	1	0
Anders Lindback	1	13	0	0	0	0.00	9	1.000	0	0	0	0

^{†}Denotes player spent time with another team before joining Predators. Stats reflect time with the Predators only.
^{‡}Traded mid-season
Bold/italics denotes franchise record

== Awards and records ==
=== Awards ===
Regular season
Player	Award	Awarded
Pekka Rinne	NHL Third Star of the Month	January 2011
Pekka Rinne	NHL Third Star of the Month	March 2011

=== Milestones ===
Regular season
Player	Milestone	Reached
Shane O'Brien	300th Career NHL Game	October 9, 2010
Anders Lindback	1st Career NHL Game; 1st Career NHL Win	October 13, 2010
Jerred Smithson	400th Career NHL Game	October 24, 2010
Linus Klasen	1st Career NHL Game	October 30, 2010
Ryan Suter	400th Career NHL Game	November 16, 2010
Anders Lindback	1st Career NHL Shutout	December 11, 2010
Nick Spaling	1st Career NHL Goal	December 13, 2010
Mark Dekanich	1st Career NHL Game	December 18, 2010
Francis Bouillon	600th Career NHL Game	December 26, 2010
Chris Mueller	1st Career NHL Game	December 28, 2010
Marcel Goc	100th Career NHL Point	January 5, 2011
Kevin Klein	200th Career NHL Game	January 5, 2011
Joel Ward	200th Career NHL Game	January 5, 2011
Cody Franson	100th Career NHL Game	January 8, 2011
Chris Mueller	1st Career NHL Assist; 1st Career NHL Point	January 16, 2011
J. P. Dumont	800th Career NHL Game	January 23, 2011
Alexander Sulzer	1st Career NHL Goal	January 23, 2011
Sergei Kostitsyn	200th Career NHL Game	January 24, 2011
Shea Weber	200th Career NHL Point	February 9, 2011
Sergei Kostitsyn	100th Career NHL Point	February 9, 2011
Jonathon Blum	1st Career NHL Game	February 22, 2011
Blake Geoffrion	1st Career NHL Game	February 26, 2011
Jonathon Blum	1st Career NHL Goal; 1st Career NHL Point	February 27, 2011
Martin Erat	600th Career NHL Game	March 1, 2011
Blake Geoffrion	1st Career NHL Goal; 1st Career NHL Point	March 1, 2011
Colin Wilson	100th Career NHL Game	March 3, 2011
Jonathon Blum	1st Career NHL Assist	March 6, 2011
Blake Geoffrion	1st Career NHL Assist	March 12, 2011
Jordin Tootoo	400th Career NHL Game	March 19, 2011
Blake Geoffrion	1st Career NHL Hat-trick	March 20, 2011
Martin Erat	400th Career NHL Point	March 31, 2011
Patric Hornqvist	100th Career NHL Point	April 2, 2011
Mike Fisher	700th Career NHL Game	April 5, 2011
Nick Spaling	100th Career NHL Game	April 5, 2011
Shea Weber	400th Career NHL Game	April 5, 2011

Playoffs
Player	Milestone	Reached
Jonathon Blum	1st Career NHL Playoff Game; 1st Career NHL Playoff Assist; 1st Career NHL Playoff Point	April 13, 2011
Blake Geoffrion	1st Career NHL Playoff Game; 1st Career NHL Playoff Assist; 1st Career NHL Playoff Point	April 13, 2011
Matthew Halischuk	1st Career NHL Playoff Game	April 13, 2011
Patric Hornqvist	1st Career NHL Playoff Goal	April 15, 2011
Jerred Smithson	1st Career NHL Playoff Assist	April 17, 2011
Matt Halischuk	1st Career NHL Playoff Goal; 1st Career NHL Playoff Point	April 20, 2011
Anders Lindback	1st Career NHL Playoff Game	April 20, 2011
Nick Spaling	1st Career NHL Playoff Assist; 1st Career NHL Playoff Point	April 22, 2011
Kevin Klein	1st Career NHL Playoff Goal	April 22, 2011
Nick Spaling	1st Career NHL Playoff Goal	April 24, 2011
Cody Franson	1st Career NHL Playoff Goal	May 5, 2011

== Transactions ==
The Predators have been involved in the following transactions during the 2010–11 season.

=== Trades ===
Date	Details
June 19, 2010	To New Jersey Devils Jason Arnott	To Nashville Predators Matthew Halischuk; 2nd-round pick in 2011 – Magnus Hellberg
June 19, 2010	To Philadelphia Flyers Dan Hamhuis; Conditional 7th-round pick in 2011 (Note: Condition not satisfied.)	To Nashville Predators Ryan Parent
June 29, 2010	To Montreal Canadiens Dan Ellis; Dustin Boyd; Future considerations	To Nashville Predators Sergei Kostitsyn; Future considerations
August 5, 2010	To Florida Panthers Mike Santorelli	To Nashville Predators Conditional 5th-round pick in 2011 – Josh Shalla
September 1, 2010	To Atlanta Thrashers Ian McKenzie	To Nashville Predators Grant Lewis
October 5, 2010	To Vancouver Canucks Ryan Parent; Jonas Andersson	To Nashville Predators Shane O'Brien; Dan Gendur
February 10, 2011	To Ottawa Senators 1st-round pick in 2011 – Stefan Noesen; Conditional 3rd-round pick in 2012 – Jarrod Maidens	To Nashville Predators Mike Fisher
February 25, 2011	To Florida Panthers Alexander Sulzer	To Nashville Predators Conditional 7th-round pick in 2012 (Note: Condition not satisfied.)

=== Free agents acquired ===
Player	Former team	Contract terms
Kelsey Wilson	Red Bull Salzburg	1 year, $525,000
Jonas Andersson	Dinamo Minsk	1 year, $675,000
Matthew Lombardi	Phoenix Coyotes	3 years, $10.5 million
Brett Palin	Abbotsford Heat	1 year, $550,000
Jamie Lundmark	Toronto Maple Leafs	1 year, $600,000
Aaron Johnson	Edmonton Oilers	1 year, $550,000
Steve Begin	Boston Bruins	1 year, $550,000
Chris Mueller	Milwaukee Admirals	1 year, $500,000

=== Free agents lost ===
Player	New team	Contract terms
Triston Grant	Florida Panthers	1 year, $510,000
Dave Scatchard	St. Louis Blues	1 year, $550,000
Denis Grebeshkov	SKA Saint Petersburg	2 years
Ben Guite	Columbus Blue Jackets	1 year, $575,000

=== Claimed via waivers ===
Player	Former team	Date claimed off waivers
Marek Svatos	St. Louis Blues	December 29, 2010

=== Lost via waivers ===
Player	New team	Date claimed off waivers
Marek Svatos	Ottawa Senators	February 24, 2011

=== Player signings ===
Player	Contract terms
Wade Belak	1 year, $575,000
Jani Lajunen	3 years, $1.845 million entry-level contract
Anders Lindback	2 years, $1.375 million entry-level contract
Roman Josi	3 years, $2.625 million entry-level contract
Atte Engren	2 years, $1.22 million entry-level contract
Blake Geoffrion	2 years, $2.125 million entry-level contract
Francis Bouillon	2 years, $2.7 million
Andreas Thuresson	1 year, $575,000
Teemu Laakso	1 year, $600,000
Sergei Kostitsyn	1 year, $550,000
Ryan Parent	2 years, $1.85 million
Mark Dekanich	1 year, $550,000
Patric Hornqvist	3 years, $9.25 million
Taylor Beck	3 years, $2.07 million entry-level contract
Cody Franson	2 years, $1.6 million
Taylor Aronson	3 years, $1.8 million entry-level contract
Jerred Smithson	2 years, $1.6 million contract extension
Austin Watson	3 years, $2.7 million entry-level contract
Ben Ryan	2 years, $1.13 million entry-level contract

== Draft picks ==
Nashville's picks at the 2010 NHL entry draft in Los Angeles, California.

Round	Pick	Player	Position	Nationality	Previous Team
1	18	Austin Watson	RW	United States	Peterborough Petes (OHL)
3	78	Taylor Aronson	D	United States	Portland Winterhawks (WHL)
5	126 (from Tampa Bay)	Patrick Cehlin	RW	Sweden	Djurgårdens IF (Elitserien)
6	168	Anthony Bitetto	D	United States	Indiana Ice (USHL)
7	194 (from St. Louis)	David Elsner	F	Germany	Landshut Cannibals (DEL2)
7	198	Joonas Rask	C	Finland	Ilves (SM-liiga)

== See also ==
- 2010–11 NHL season
