= 2010–11 Detroit Red Wings season =

Sports season

2010–11 Detroit Red Wings
- Central Division champions
- Division: 1st Central
- Conference: 3rd Western
- 2010–11 record: 47–25–10
- Home record: 21–14–6
- Road record: 26–11–4
- Goals for: 261
- Goals against: 241

Team information
- General manager: Ken Holland
- Coach: Mike Babcock
- Captain: Nicklas Lidstrom
- Alternate captains: Pavel Datsyuk; Kris Draper; Henrik Zetterberg
- Arena: Joe Louis Arena
- Average attendance: 19,680 (98.5%); Total: 806,892 (41 games)

Team leaders
- Goals: Johan Franzen (28)
- Assists: Henrik Zetterberg (56)
- Points: Henrik Zetterberg (80)
- Penalty minutes: Jonathan Ericsson (87)
- Plus/minus: Justin Abdelkader (+15)
- Wins: Jimmy Howard (37)
- Goals against average: Joey MacDonald (2.58)

The 2010–11 Detroit Red Wings season was the 85th season of play for the National Hockey League (NHL) franchise that was established on September 25, 1926, and saw the Red Wings equal the Dallas Cowboys (from 1966 to 1985) in second place for the most consecutive winning seasons in major North American professional sports.

== Off season ==
The 2010 Detroit Red Wings off-season saw the acquisitions of Joey MacDonald from the Anaheim Ducks and Mike Modano from the Dallas Stars. In the 2010 NHL entry draft, the Red Wings picked Riley Sheahan out of the University of Notre Dame for their first round pick. The Red Wings looked to improve off of their 44–24–14 record in the 2009–10 season and make the Stanley Cup playoffs for the 20th consecutive season.

== Regular season ==
On January 18, Nicklas Lidstrom was voted by the players to represent one of the teams as captain during the 2011 NHL All-Star Game.

=== Divisional standings ===
Central Division
		GP	W	L	OTL	ROW	GF	GA	Pts
**1**	**y-Detroit Red Wings**	**82**	**47**	**25**	**10**	**43**	**261**	**241**	**104**
**2**	**Nashville Predators**	**82**	**44**	**27**	**11**	**38**	**219**	**194**	**99**
**3**	**Chicago Blackhawks**	**82**	**44**	**29**	**9**	**38**	**258**	**225**	**97**
4	St. Louis Blues	82	38	33	11	34	240	234	87
5	Columbus Blue Jackets	82	34	35	13	29	215	258	81

=== Conference standings ===
Western Conference
R		Div	GP	W	L	OTL	ROW	GF	GA	Pts
**1**	**p – Vancouver Canucks**	**NW**	**82**	**54**	**19**	**9**	**50**	**262**	**185**	117
**2**	**y – San Jose Sharks**	**PA**	**82**	**48**	**25**	**9**	**43**	**248**	**213**	105
**3**	**y – Detroit Red Wings**	**CE**	**82**	**47**	**25**	**10**	**43**	**261**	**241**	104
**4**	**Anaheim Ducks**	**PA**	**82**	**47**	**30**	**5**	**43**	**239**	**235**	99
**5**	**Nashville Predators**	**CE**	**82**	**44**	**27**	**11**	**38**	**219**	**194**	99
**6**	**Phoenix Coyotes**	**PA**	**82**	**43**	**26**	**13**	**38**	**231**	**226**	99
**7**	**Los Angeles Kings**	**PA**	**82**	**46**	**30**	**6**	**36**	**219**	**198**	98
**8**	**Chicago Blackhawks**	**CE**	**82**	**44**	**29**	**9**	**38**	**258**	**225**	97
8.5
9	Dallas Stars	PA	82	42	29	11	37	227	233	95
10	Calgary Flames	NW	82	41	29	12	32	250	237	94
11	St. Louis Blues	CE	82	38	33	11	34	240	234	87
12	Minnesota Wild	NW	82	39	35	8	36	206	233	86
13	Columbus Blue Jackets	CE	82	34	35	13	29	215	258	81
14	Colorado Avalanche	NW	82	30	44	8	24	227	288	68
15	Edmonton Oilers	NW	82	25	45	12	23	193	269	62

bold – qualified for playoffs; y – Won division; p – Won President's Trophy (best record in NHL)
CE – Central Division, NW – Northwest Division, PA – Pacific Division

== Schedule and results ==
2010–11 Game Log

October: 6–2–1 (Home: 4–1–1; Road: 2–1–0)
#	Date	Opponent	Score	OT	Decision	Arena	Attendance	Record	Pts	Recap
1	October 8	Anaheim Ducks	W 4–0		Howard	Joe Louis Arena	20,066	1–0–0	2
2	October 9	@ Chicago Blackhawks	W 3–2		Osgood	United Center	22,161	2–0–0	4
3	October 12	Colorado Avalanche	L 4–5	SO	Howard	Joe Louis Arena	19,651	2–0–1	5
4	October 14	@ Dallas Stars	L 1–4		Osgood	American Airlines Arena	18,532	2–1–1	5
5	October 16	@ Phoenix Coyotes	W 2-1	OT	Howard	Jobing.com Arena	17,125	3-1-1	7
6	October 21	Calgary Flames	W 4–2		Howard	Joe Louis Arena	18,399	4-1-1	9
7	October 23	Anaheim Ducks	W 5–4		Howard	Joe Louis Arena	19,401	5-1-1	11
8	October 28	Phoenix Coyotes	L 2–4		Osgood	Joe Louis Arena	18,165	5-2-1	11
9	October 30	Nashville Predators	W 5–2		Osgood	Joe Louis Arena	18,771	6-2-1	13

November: 10–2–1 (Home: 6–0–1; Road: 4–2–0)
#	Date	Opponent	Score	OT	Decision	Arena	Attendance	Record	Pts	Recap
10	November 3	@ Calgary Flames	W 2–1		Howard	Pengrowth Saddledome	19,289	7-2-1	15
11	November 5	@ Edmonton Oilers	W 3–1		Howard	Rexall Place	16,839	8-2-1	17
12	November 6	@ Vancouver Canucks	L 4–6		Howard	Rogers Arena	18,860	8-3-1	17
13	November 8	Phoenix Coyotes	W 3–2	OT	Howard	Joe Louis Arena	19,207	9-3-1	19
14	November 11	Edmonton Oilers	W 6–2		Howard	Joe Louis Arena	20,066	10-3-1	21
15	November 13	Colorado Avalanche	W 3–1		Howard	Joe Louis Arena	20,066	11-3-1	23
16	November 17	St. Louis Blues	W 7–3		Howard	Joe Louis Arena	20,066	12-3-1	25
17	November 19	Minnesota Wild	L 3–4	OT	Howard	Joe Louis Arena	20,066	12-3-2	26
18	November 21	Calgary Flames	W 5–4	OT	Howard	Joe Louis Arena	19,636	13-3-2	28
19	November 24	@ Atlanta Thrashers	L 1–5		Howard	Philips Arena	15,337	13-4-2	28
20	November 26	@ Columbus Blue Jackets	W 2–1		Howard	Nationwide Arena	18,391	14-4-2	30
21	November 28	Columbus Blue Jackets	W 4–2		Howard	Joe Louis Arena	18,860	15-4-2	32
22	November 30	@ San Jose Sharks	W 5–3		Howard	HP Pavilion	17,562	16-4-2	34

December: 8–5–3 (Home: 3–3–2; Road: 5–2–1)
#	Date	Opponent	Score	OT	Decision	Arena	Attendance	Record	Pts	Recap
23	December 3	@ Anaheim Ducks	W 4–0		Howard	Honda Center	15,173	17-4-2	36
24	December 4	@ Los Angeles Kings	L 2–3	OT	Osgood	Staples Center	18,118	17-4-3	37
25	December 6	San Jose Sharks	L 2–5		Howard	Joe Louis Arena	19,010	17-5-3	37
26	December 8	Nashville Predators	L 2–3		Howard	Joe Louis Arena	17,359	17-6-3	37
27	December 10	Montreal Canadiens	W 4–2		Howard	Joe Louis Arena	20,066	18-6-3	39
28	December 11	@ New Jersey Devils	W 2–1		Osgood	Prudential Center	17,625	19-6-3	41
29	December 13	Los Angeles Kings	L 0–5		Howard	Joe Louis Arena	17,810	19-7-3	41
30	December 15	St. Louis Blues	W 5–2		Howard	Joe Louis Arena	18,769	20-7-3	43
31	December 17	@ Chicago Blackhawks	L 1–4		Howard	United Center	21,904	20-8-3	43
32	December 19	Dallas Stars	L 3–4	OT	Osgood	Joe Louis Arena	20,066	20-8-4	44
33	December 22	Vancouver Canucks	W 5–4	OT	Howard	Joe Louis Arena	20,066	21-8-4	46
34	December 23	@ St. Louis Blues	L 3–4		Osgood	Scottrade Center	19,150	21-9-4	46
35	December 26	@ Minnesota Wild	W 4–1		Howard	Xcel Energy Center	19,227	22-9-4	48
36	December 27	@ Colorado Avalanche	W 4–3	OT	Osgood	Pepsi Center	18,007	23-9-4	50
37	December 29	@ Dallas Stars	W 7–3		Howard	American Airlines Center	18,532	24-9-4	52
38	December 31	New York Islanders	L 3–4	OT	Howard	Joe Louis Arena	20,066	24-9-5	53

January: 6–4–1 (Home: 2–2–0; Road: 4–2–1)
#	Date	Opponent	Score	OT	Decision	Arena	Attendance	Record	Pts	Recap
39	January 2	Philadelphia Flyers	L 2–3		Howard	Joe Louis Arena	20,066	24-10-5	53
40	January 4	@ Edmonton Oilers	W 5–3		Osgood	Rexall Place	16,839	25-10-5	55
41	January 7	@ Calgary Flames	W 5–4	SO	Howard	Pengrowth Saddledome	19,289	26-10-5	57
42	January 8	@ Vancouver Canucks	W 2–1	SO	Howard	Rogers Arena	18,860	27-10-5	59
43	January 10	@ Colorado Avalanche	L 4–5		MacDonald	Pepsi Center	17,535	27-11-5	59
44	January 14	@ Columbus Blue Jackets	L 2–3	SO	MacDonald	Nationwide Arena	18,684	27-11-6	60
45	January 15	Columbus Blue Jackets	W 6–5	OT	MacDonald	Joe Louis Arena	20,066	28-11-6	62
46	January 18	@ Pittsburgh Penguins	L 1–4		MacDonald	Consol Energy Center	18,284	28-12-6	62
47	January 20	@ St. Louis Blues	W 4–3	OT	Howard	Scottrade Center	19,150	29-12-6	64
48	January 22	Chicago Blackhawks	L 1–4		Howard	Joe Louis Arena	20,066	29-13-6	64
49	January 26	New Jersey Devils	W 3–1		Howard	Joe Louis Arena	20,066	30-13-6	66

February: 9–5–0 (Home: 2–4–0; Road: 7–1–0)
#	Date	Opponent	Score	OT	Decision	Arena	Attendance	Record	Pts	Recap
50	February 2	@ Ottawa Senators	W 7–5		Howard	Scotiabank Place	18,011	31-13-6	68
51	February 4	Columbus Blue Jackets	L 0–3		Howard	Joe Louis Arena	20,066	31-14-6	68
52	February 5	@ Nashville Predators	L 0–3		MacDondald	Bridgestone Arena	17,113	31-15-6	68
53	February 7	New York Rangers	W 3–2		Howard	Joe Louis Arena	20,066	32-15-6	70
54	February 9	Nashville Predators	L 1–4		Howard	Joe Louis Arena	20,066	32-16-6	70
55	February 11	@ Boston Bruins	W 6–1		Howard	TD Garden	17,565	33-16-6	72
56	February 13	Boston Bruins	W 4–2		Howard	Joe Louis Arena	20,066	34-16-6	74
57	February 17	@ Tampa Bay Lightning	W 6–2		Howard	St. Pete Times Forum	20,849	35-16-6	76
58	February 18	@ Florida Panthers	W 4–3		MacDondald	BankAtlantic Center	19,947	36-16-6	78
59	February 20	@ Minnesota Wild	W 2–1	SO	Howard	Xcel Energy Center	18,912	37-16-6	80
60	February 22	San Jose Sharks	L 3–4		Howard	Joe Louis Arena	20,066	37-17-6	80
61	February 24	Dallas Stars	L 2–4		Howard	Joe Louis Arena	20,066	37-18-6	80
62	February 26	@ Buffalo Sabres	W 3–2	SO	MacDondald	HSBC Arena	18,690	38-18-6	82
63	February 28	@ Los Angeles Kings	W 7–4		Howard	Staples Center	18,118	39-18-6	84

March: 5–5–4 (Home: 3–3–2; Road: 2–2–2)
#	Date	Opponent	Score	OT	Decision	Arena	Attendance	Record	Pts	Recap
64	March 2	@ Anaheim Ducks	L 1–2	OT	Howard	Honda Center	15,098	39-18-7	85
65	March 3	@ San Jose Sharks	L 1–3		MacDonald	HP Pavilion	17,562	39-19-7	85
66	March 5	@ Phoenix Coyotes	L 4–5	SO	Howard	Jobing.com Arena	17,382	39-19-8	86
67	March 9	Los Angeles Kings	L 1–2		Howard	Joe Louis Arena	20,066	39-20-8	86
68	March 11	Edmonton Oilers	W 2–1	OT	Howard	Joe Louis Arena	20,066	40-20-8	88
69	March 12	@ St. Louis Blues	W 5–3		Howard	Scottrade Center	19,150	41-20-8	90
70	March 16	Washington Capitals	W 3–2		Howard	Joe Louis Arena	20,066	42-20-8	92
71	March 17	@ Columbus Blue Jackets	W 2–0		MacDonald	Nationwide Arena	14,444	43-20-8	94
72	March 19	@ Nashville Predators	L 1–3		Howard	Bridgestone Arena	17,113	43-21-8	94
73	March 21	Pittsburgh Penguins	L 4–5	SO	MacDonald	Joe Louis Arena	20,066	43-21-9	95
74	March 23	Vancouver Canucks	L 1–2		Howard	Joe Louis Arena	20,066	43-22-9	95
75	March 26	Toronto Maple Leafs	W 4–2		MacDonald	Joe Louis Arena	20,066	44-22-9	97
76	March 28	Chicago Blackhawks	L 2–3	OT	MacDonald	Joe Louis Arena	20,066	44-22-10	98
77	March 30	St. Louis Blues	L 3–10		MacDonald	Joe Louis Arena	20,066	44-23-10	98

April: 3–2–0 (Home: 1–1–0; Road: 2–1–0)
#	Date	Opponent	Score	OT	Decision	Arena	Attendance	Record	Pts	Recap
78	April 2	@ Nashville Predators	W 4–3	OT	Howard	Bridgestone Arena	17,113	45-23-10	100
79	April 3	Minnesota Wild	W 4–2		Howard	Joe Louis Arena	20,066	46-23-10	102
80	April 6	@ Carolina Hurricanes	L 0–3		Howard	RBC Center	17,602	46-24-10	102
81	April 8	Chicago Blackhawks	L 2–4		Howard	Joe Louis Arena	20,066	46-25-10	102
82	April 10	@ Chicago Blackhawks	W 4–3		Howard	United Center	22,046	47-25-10	104

Legend: Win (2 points) Loss (0 points) Overtime/shootout loss (1 point)

== Playoffs ==
The Detroit Red Wings have qualified for the Stanley Cup playoffs for the 20th consecutive season. The Red Wings currently hold the longest current streak of post-season appearances in all of North American professional sports.

2011 Stanley Cup playoffs

Western Conference Quarter-final vs. (6) Phoenix Coyotes: Detroit won series 4–0
Game	Date	Opponent	Score	OT	Decision	Arena	Attendance	Series	Recap
1	April 13	Phoenix Coyotes	W 4–2		Howard	Joe Louis Arena	20,066	1–0
2	April 16	Phoenix Coyotes	W 4–3		Howard	Joe Louis Arena	20,066	2–0
3	April 18	@ Phoenix Coyotes	W 4–2		Howard	Jobing.com Arena	17,130	3–0
4	April 20	@ Phoenix Coyotes	W 6–3		Howard	Jobing.com Arena	17,314	4–0

Western Conference Semi-final vs. (2) San Jose Sharks: San Jose won series 4–3
Game	Date	Opponent	Score	OT	Decision	Arena	Attendance	Series	Recap
1	April 29	@ San Jose Sharks	L 1–2	OT	Howard	HP Pavilion	17,562	0–1
2	May 1	@ San Jose Sharks	L 1–2		Howard	HP Pavilion	17,562	0–2
3	May 4	San Jose Sharks	L 3–4	OT	Howard	Joe Louis Arena	20,066	0–3
4	May 6	San Jose Sharks	W 4–3		Howard	Joe Louis Arena	20,066	1–3
5	May 8	@ San Jose Sharks	W 4–3		Howard	HP Pavilion	17,562	2–3
6	May 10	San Jose Sharks	W 3–1		Howard	Joe Louis Arena	20,066	3–3
7	May 12	@ San Jose Sharks	L 2-3		Howard	HP Pavilion	17,562	3-4

Legend: Win Loss

- *Denotes if necessary

== Player statistics ==
=== Skaters ===
Note: GP = Games played; G = Goals; A = Assists; Pts = Points; +/− = Plus/minus; PIM = Penalty minutes

Regular season

Player	GP	G	A	Pts	+/−	PIM
Henrik Zetterberg	80	24	56	80	-1	40
Nicklas Lidstrom	82	16	46	62	-2	20
Pavel Datsyuk	56	23	36	59	11	15
Johan Franzen	76	28	27	55	5	58
Brian Rafalski	63	4	44	48	11	22
Daniel Cleary	68	26	20	46	-1	20
Todd Bertuzzi	81	16	29	45	-7	71
Valtteri Filppula	71	16	23	39	-1	22
Tomas Holmstrom	73	18	19	37	-6	62
Niklas Kronwall	77	11	26	37	5	36
Jiri Hudler	73	10	27	37	-7	28
Darren Helm	82	12	20	32	9	16
Brad Stuart	67	3	17	20	4	40
Patrick Eaves	63	13	7	20	-2	14
Justin Abdelkader	74	7	12	19	15	61
Drew Miller	67	10	8	18	-2	13
Mike Modano	40	4	11	15	-4	8
Jonathan Ericsson	74	3	12	15	8	87
Kris Draper	47	6	5	11	1	12
Ruslan Salei	75	2	8	10	0	48
Jakub Kindl	48	2	2	4	-6	36
Cory Emmerton	2	1	0	1	1	0
Jan Mursak	19	1	0	1	-3	4
Tomas Tatar	9	1	0	1	0	0
Doug Janik	7	0	0	0	-2	7

Playoffs

Player	GP	G	A	Pts	+/−	PIM
Pavel Datsyuk	11	4	11	15	10	8
Nicklas Lidstrom	11	4	4	8	8	4
Henrik Zetterberg	7	3	5	8	6	2
Valtteri Filppula	11	2	6	8	5	6
Tomas Holmstrom	11	3	4	7	7	8
Todd Bertuzzi	11	2	4	6	1	15
Daniel Cleary	11	2	4	6	2	6
Niklas Kronwall	11	2	4	6	5	4
Darren Helm	11	3	3	6	1	8
Patrick Eaves	11	3	1	4	1	6
Brian Rafalski	11	2	1	3	-1	4
Jiri Hudler	10	1	2	3	-1	6
Jonathan Ericsson	11	1	2	3	-2	4
Johan Franzen	8	2	1	3	-1	6
Brad Stuart	11	0	2	2	6	8
Drew Miller	9	1	1	2	3	4
Kris Draper	8	0	1	1	2	2
Mike Modano	2	0	1	1	1	0
Ruslan Salei	11	1	0	1	6	0
Justin Abdelkader	11	0	0	0	-4	22

=== Goaltenders ===
Note: GP = Games played; TOI = Time on ice (minutes); W = Wins; L = Losses; OT = Overtime losses; GA = Goals against; SO = Shutouts; Sv% = Save percentage; GAA = Goals against average

Regular season

Player	GP	TOI	W	L	OT	GA	GAA	SA	Sv%	SO	G	A	PIM
Jimmy Howard	63	3615	37	17	5	168	2.79	1830	.908	2	0	1	4
Joey MacDonald	15	721	5	5	3	31	2.58	372	.917	1	0	0	0
Chris Osgood	11	629	5	3	2	29	2.77	298	.903	0	0	0	4
Thomas McCollum	1	15	0	0	0	3	12.00	8	.625	0	0	0	0

Playoffs

Player	GP	TOI	W	L	GA	GAA	SA	Sv%	SO	G	A	PIM
Jimmy Howard	11	673:22	7	4	28	2.50	364	.923	0	0	0	2

^{†}Denotes player spent time with another team before joining Red Wings. Stats reflect time with the Red Wings only.
^{‡}Traded mid-season
Bold/italics denotes franchise record

== Awards and records ==
=== Awards ===
Regular Season
Player	Award	Awarded
Brian Rafalski	NHL Third Star of the Week	November 22, 2010
Henrik Zetterberg	NHL Third Star of the Week	December 27, 2010
Nicklas Lidstrom	NHL Third Star of the Week	January 3, 2011
Nicklas Lidstrom	NHL Third Star of the Month	December 2010
Johan Franzen	NHL First Star of the Week	February 7, 2011
Nicklas Lidstrom	James Norris Memorial Trophy	June 2011

=== Milestones ===
Regular Season
Player	Milestone	Reached
Brad Stuart	200th Career NHL Assist	October 8, 2010
Darren Helm	100th Career NHL Game	October 9, 2010
Pavel Datsyuk	200th Career NHL Goal	October 12, 2010
Todd Bertuzzi	400th Career NHL Assist	October 14, 2010
Pavel Datsyuk	600th Career NHL Point	October 28, 2010
Pavel Datsyuk	400th Career NHL Assist	November 3, 2010
Valtteri Filppula	300th Career NHL Game	November 3, 2010
Johan Franzen	100th Career NHL Goal	November 11, 2010
Brian Rafalski	400th Career NHL Assist	November 21, 2010
Jonathan Ericsson	100th Career NHL Game	November 24, 2010
Tomas Holmstrom	900th Career NHL Game	November 28, 2010
Danny Cleary	700th Career NHL Game; 300th Career NHL Point	November 30, 2010
Henrik Zetterberg	500th Career NHL Point	December 3, 2010
Nicklas Lidstrom	1st Career NHL Hat Trick	December 15, 2010
Ruslan Salei	200th Career NHL Point	December 22, 2010
Jan Mursak	1st Career NHL Game	December 27, 2010
Chris Osgood	400th Career NHL Win	December 27, 2010
Jimmy Howard	100th Career NHL Game	December 29, 2010
Tomas Tatar	1st Career NHL Game; 1st Career NHL Goal; 1st Career NHL Point	December 31, 2010
Brian Rafalski	800th Career NHL Game	January 7, 2011
Henrik Zetterberg	300th Career NHL Assist	January 7, 2011
Jan Mursak	1st Career NHL Goal; 1st Career NHL Point	January 10, 2011
Kris Draper	200th Career NHL Assist	January 15, 2011
Jakub Kindl	1st Career NHL Goal; 1st Career NHL Point	January 20, 2011
Cory Emmerton	1st Career NHL Game; 1st Career NHL Goal; 1st Career NHL Point	January 22, 2011
Johan Franzen	200th Career NHL Point	January 26, 2011
Jiri Hudler	300th Career NHL Game	February 2, 2011
Brian Rafalski	500th Career NHL Point	February 2, 2011
Justin Abdelkader	100th Career NHL Game	February 9, 2011
Todd Bertuzzi	700th Career NHL Point	February 11, 2011
Jakub Kindl	1st Career NHL Assist	February 17, 2011
Todd Bertuzzi	1,000th Career NHL Game	February 20, 2011
Ruslan Salei	900th Career NHL Game	February 22, 2011
Nicklas Lidstrom	1,100th Career NHL Point	March 5, 2011
Tomas Holmstrom	500th Career NHL Point	March 21, 2011
Jiri Hudler	100th Career NHL Assist	March 26, 2011
Thomas McCollum	1st Career NHL Game	March 30, 2011
Drew Miller	200th Career NHL Game	April 10, 2011
Valtteri Filppula	100th Career NHL Assist	April 10, 2011

Playoffs
Player	Milestone	Reached
Henrik Zetterberg	100th Career NHL Playoff Game	May 4, 2011
Brian Rafalski	100th Career NHL Playoff Point	May 6, 2011
Daniel Cleary	100th Career NHL Playoff Game	May 8, 2011

== Transactions ==
The Red Wings have been involved in the following transactions during the 2010–11 season.

=== Trades ===
Date	Details

=== Free agents acquired ===
Player	Former team	Contract terms
Joey MacDonald	Anaheim Ducks	1 year, $550,000
Chris Minard	Edmonton Oilers	2 years, $1.05 million
Jamie Johnson	Rochester Americans	2 years, $1 million
Mike Modano	Dallas Stars	1 year, $1.25 million
Ruslan Salei	Colorado Avalanche	1 year, $750,000
Trevor Parkes	Montreal Junior Hockey Club	3 years, $1.625 million entry-level contract
Evgeni Nabokov	SKA Saint Petersburg	1 year, $570,000

=== Free agents lost ===
Player	New team	Contract terms
Brett Lebda	Toronto Maple Leafs	2 years, $2.9 million
Jeremy Williams	New York Rangers	1 year, $515,000
Andreas Lilja	Anaheim Ducks	1 year, $600,000

=== Claimed via waivers ===
Player	Former team	Date claimed off waivers

=== Lost via waivers ===
Player	New team	Date claimed off waivers
Mattias Ritola	Tampa Bay Lightning	October 5, 2010
Evgeni Nabokov	New York Islanders	January 22, 2011

=== Lost via retirement ===
Player
Kirk Maltby

=== Player signings ===
Player	Contract terms
Mitchell Callahan	3 years, $1.675 million entry-level contract
Mattias Ritola	3 years, $1.55 million
Brendan Smith	3 years, $2.625 million entry-level contract
Nicklas Lidstrom	1 year, $6.2 million
Tomas Holmstrom	2 years, $3.75 million
Ilari Filppula	1 year, $500,000
Todd Bertuzzi	2 years, $3.875 million
Drew Miller	1 year, $650,000
Patrick Eaves	1 year, $750,000
Derek Meech	1 year, $500,000
Sergei Kolosov	1 year, $500,000
Darren Helm	2 years, $1.825 million
Jamie Tardif	1 year, $550,000
Justin Abdelkader	2 years, $1.575 million
Kirk Maltby	1 year, $525,000
Landon Ferraro	3 years, $2.145 million entry-level contract
Louis-Marc Aubry	3 years, $1.845 million entry-level contract
Gleason Fournier	3 years, $1.82 million entry-level contract
Jan Mursak	2 years, $1.1 million contract extension
Jimmy Howard	2 years, $4.5 million contract extension
Gustav Nyquist	2 years, $1.525 million entry-level contract

== Draft picks ==
The 2010 NHL entry draft was held in Los Angeles on June 25–26, 2010.

Round	Overall pick	Player	Position	Nationality	College/Junior/Club team (League)
1	21	Riley Sheahan	C	Canada	University of Notre Dame (CCHA)
2	51	Calle Jarnkrok	C	Sweden	Brynäs IF (Elitserien)
3	81	Louis-Marc Aubry	C	Canada	Montreal Junior Hockey Club (QMJHL)
4	111	Teemu Pulkkinen	LW	Finland	Jokerit (SM-liiga)
5	141	Petr Mrazek	G	Czech Republic	Ottawa 67's (OHL)
6	171	Brooks Macek	C	Canada	Tri-City Americans (WHL)
7	201	Ben Marshall	D	United States	Mahtomedi Senior High School (USHS-MN)

== See also ==
- 2010–11 NHL season

== Farm teams ==
The Grand Rapids Griffins remain Detroit's American Hockey League (AHL) affiliate in 2010–11 and the Toledo Walleye will become the team's ECHL affiliate in 2010–11.
