= 2010–11 Calgary Flames season =

NHL team season

2010–11 Calgary Flames
- Division: 2nd Northwest
- Conference: 10th Western
- 2010–11 record: 41–29–12
- Home record: 23–13–5
- Road record: 18–16–7
- Goals for: 250
- Goals against: 237

Team information
- General manager: Darryl Sutter (Oct.–Dec.); Jay Feaster (interim, Dec.–Apr.)
- Coach: Brent Sutter
- Captain: Jarome Iginla
- Alternate captains: Jay Bouwmeester; Robyn Regehr
- Arena: Scotiabank Saddledome
- Average attendance: 19,819

Team leaders
- Goals: Jarome Iginla (43)
- Assists: Alex Tanguay (47)
- Points: Jarome Iginla (86)
- Penalty minutes: Tim Jackman (86)
- Plus/minus: Anton Babchuk (+18)
- Wins: Miikka Kiprusoff (37)
- Goals against average: Henrik Karlsson (2.58)

The 2010–11 Calgary Flames season was the 31st season in Calgary and 39th for the Flames franchise in the National Hockey League (NHL). The Flames had an improved season compared to the previous season and finished second in the Northwest Division but failed to qualify for the playoffs after finishing just three points out of a playoff spot resulting in them finishing 10th in the Western Conference. It was the second consecutive season that the Flames missed the playoffs.

The franchise reached two milestones during the season: In November, Curtis Glencross scored the 10,000th goal in franchise history dating back to the founding of the Atlanta Flames in 1972, and in January, the Flames played their 3,000th game. Calgary hosted the 2011 Heritage Classic, an outdoor game against the Montreal Canadiens. The Flames won the game 4–0 as goaltender Miikka Kiprusoff became the first goaltender to record a shutout in an NHL outdoor game.

Individually, forward Craig Conroy played his 1,000th game before retiring mid season. Team captain Jarome Iginla scored his 500th career assist in January, then recorded his 1,000th point in March en route to leading the team in scoring with 86 points. Former owner Doc Seaman was posthumously inducted into the Hockey Hall of Fame.

The season marked a turning point for the organization, as general manager Darryl Sutter announced in December that he was resigning from the position after eight years with the Flames. Assistant general manager Jay Feaster assumed full responsibility for the team on an interim basis.

== Pre-season ==
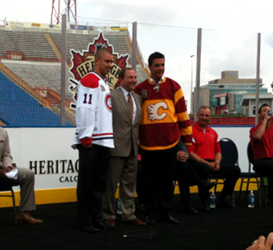
Josh Gorges, Gary Bettman and Steve Staios unveil the uniforms to be worn for the 2011 Heritage Classic.

Failure to qualify for the 2010 Stanley Cup playoffs resulted in changes to the team's management and evaluation structure. Former Tampa Bay Lightning general manager Jay Feaster was hired to serve as an assistant to Darryl Sutter, while three scouts were released by the organization as it planned to take a new direction in its amateur scouting.

The organization participated in a five-team prospects tournament held in Penticton, British Columbia, that included the Vancouver Canucks, Edmonton Oilers, Anaheim Ducks and San Jose Sharks. Calgary's prospects played three games, defeating the Ducks 8–4 before losing to the Oilers and Canucks by 5–3 and 5–4 scores, respectively.

The Flames played seven games as part of their exhibition schedule, including split-squad games on September 21 against the Vancouver Canucks, with each city hosting one of the match-ups. Calgary faced the New York Islanders in Saskatoon for the second consecutive season. They went unbeaten in the pre-season, recording seven consecutive victories.

Calgary ended the exhibition season with several injuries to key players. Centre Daymond Langkow remained sidelined following a neck injury suffered the previous season, while Ryan Stone (knee) was also out. Matt Stajan suffered a shoulder separation, David Moss also suffered a shoulder injury and Ales Kotalik was lost to a knee injury. As a result of the injuries, the Flames signed centre Brendan Morrison to a contract; Morrison had been in training camp with the Canucks before being released. Rookie defenceman T. J. Brodie proved the surprise player of training camp. Expected to start the year with the Abbotsford Heat of the American Hockey League (AHL), Brodie impressed the Flames' coaching staff and earned a position on the team to begin the NHL season.

== Regular season ==
=== October–December ===
The Flames endured a disastrous start to the season, suffering two shutout losses in their first three games. The second, a 3–0 loss to the Florida Panthers, ended with Flames fans loudly booing the team as it left the ice. Three more players were lost to injury, Raitis Ivanans and Rene Bourque (head injuries) and Adam Pardy (shoulder), while the team's top scoring line of Jarome Iginla, Olli Jokinen and Alex Tanguay was held pointless. The team's early struggles resulted in a lengthy meeting between the players and coaches about the team's need to compete harder. The team responded to the meeting with a stronger effort in a 5–3 victory over the Oilers in which Iginla and Tanguay scored their first goals of the season alongside Matt Stajan, who took Jokinen's spot on the top line.

The win over Edmonton began a streak where Calgary won five of six games, ending with another victory over the Oilers, 5–4 in a shootout, on October 26. The Flames ended October with consecutive home losses, to the Colorado Avalanche and Washington Capitals, in which they surrendered two-goal leads in both. The team entered November in the midst of a streak where they lost six of seven games. During the slump, rookie forward Brett Sutter was arrested in Scottsdale, Arizona, on charges that he assaulted a cab driver. Sutter apologized for the incident and his teammates issued a release expressing support, but he was demoted to Abbotsford a few days later. He was subsequently traded to the Carolina Hurricanes along with Ian White in exchange for defenceman Anton Babchuk and forward Tom Kostopoulos in a deal that was being discussed by the two teams prior to Sutter's legal troubles.

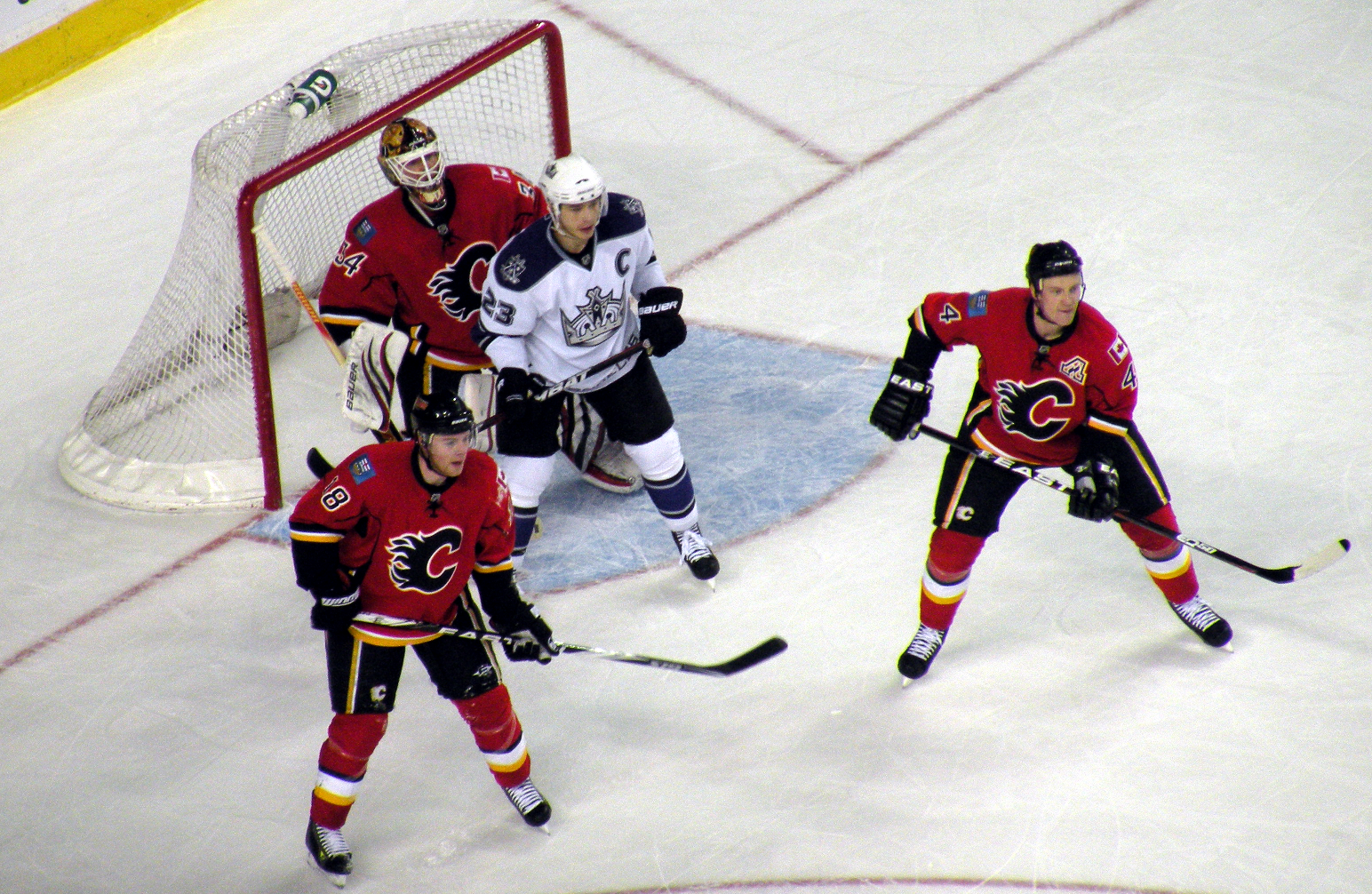
The Flames defend their net against the Los Angeles Kings

Calgary struggled to a 4–7–2 record in November, losing six of their last seven road games during the month. However, the team ended the month with its star players playing their best games of the season. Kiprusoff recorded his third shutout of the season in a 3–0 win against the Minnesota Wild while Iginla scored eight goals and 12 points in the final nine games of the month. Though they sat in 14th place in the 15-team Western Conference, the Flames ended November only five points out of a playoff spot. The organization reached a milestone during the month, as Curtis Glencross scored the 10,000th goal in the history of the Flames franchise during a 3–2 victory over the Philadelphia Flyers on November 26.

The team's struggles continued into December, where the Flames lost four of six games to begin the month. Back-to-back victories over the Columbus Blue Jackets and Toronto Maple Leafs on December 13 and 16, respectively, marked the first time the team won consecutive games since late October. The latter victory also spoiled Dion Phaneuf's first return to Calgary following his trade to Toronto the previous season. The Flames followed the victories with three consecutive losses, but entered the Christmas break on a positive note with a 3–2 shootout victory over the Dallas Stars.

Despite a victory over the Buffalo Sabres after Christmas, and with the team still mired in 14th place in the Western Conference, general manager and Executive Vice President Darryl Sutter announced his resignation from both positions on December 28, exactly eight years after he was hired by the team to become its coach in 2002. The move was not entirely Sutter's decision, as he was asked by the organization to step aside. The decision came as a shock to many fans, even as it was believed to be inevitable following the team's decline in recent seasons. Jay Feaster assumed control of the team, serving as acting general manager.

=== January–April ===
Calgary ended 2010 with three consecutive wins and won their first game in 2011 for a season-high four-game winning streak. The streak came to an end at the hands of the New York Islanders on January 3, a contest that marked the Flames franchise's 3,000th game in its history. Losses to Vancouver, Detroit and Carolina followed, the latter two in overtime, but the Flames' four-game eastern road trip that began in Carolina ended with the team registering two wins and six points. The last game of the trip, against the Montreal Canadiens, saw the team come back from a 4–0 deficit to force the contest into overtime before Montreal prevailed. Kiprusoff struggled throughout the road trip, and was jeered by the fans on the team's first game home, a 6–0 loss to Minnesota.

The team rebounded from the loss, as backup goaltender Henrik Karlsson led the Flames to a 7–4 victory over the Dallas Stars on January 21. Kiprusoff then showed a return to form by making 41 saves to lead the Flames to a 4–3 shootout win over Vancouver the following night. Victories over the Nashville Predators and St. Louis Blues allowed the Flames to enter the All-Star break on a four-game winning streak. Posting a 10–3–3 record in the 16 games leading up to the break, the Flames had pulled themselves to within two points of the eighth and final playoff spot in the West, and stood six points shy of fourth in the conference.

On February 3, The Flames rolled into Atlanta on a five-game win streak and beat the Atlanta Thrashers 4-2 extending their streak to six for their first win in the city since Atlanta was awarded a replacement franchise for the Flames in 1999. The win ended the 'Atlanta Jinx' that began on April 1, 1980, with a 5–2 home loss to the Buffalo Sabres and was the first win for the franchise since March 28, 1980 when the Flames beat the Rangers at the Omni Coliseum in their third last home game. This would also be their last franchise win and game played in Atlanta as the Thrashers moved to Winnipeg the next season. During the jinx the Flames had gone 0-7-1 in the city dating back to 1980.

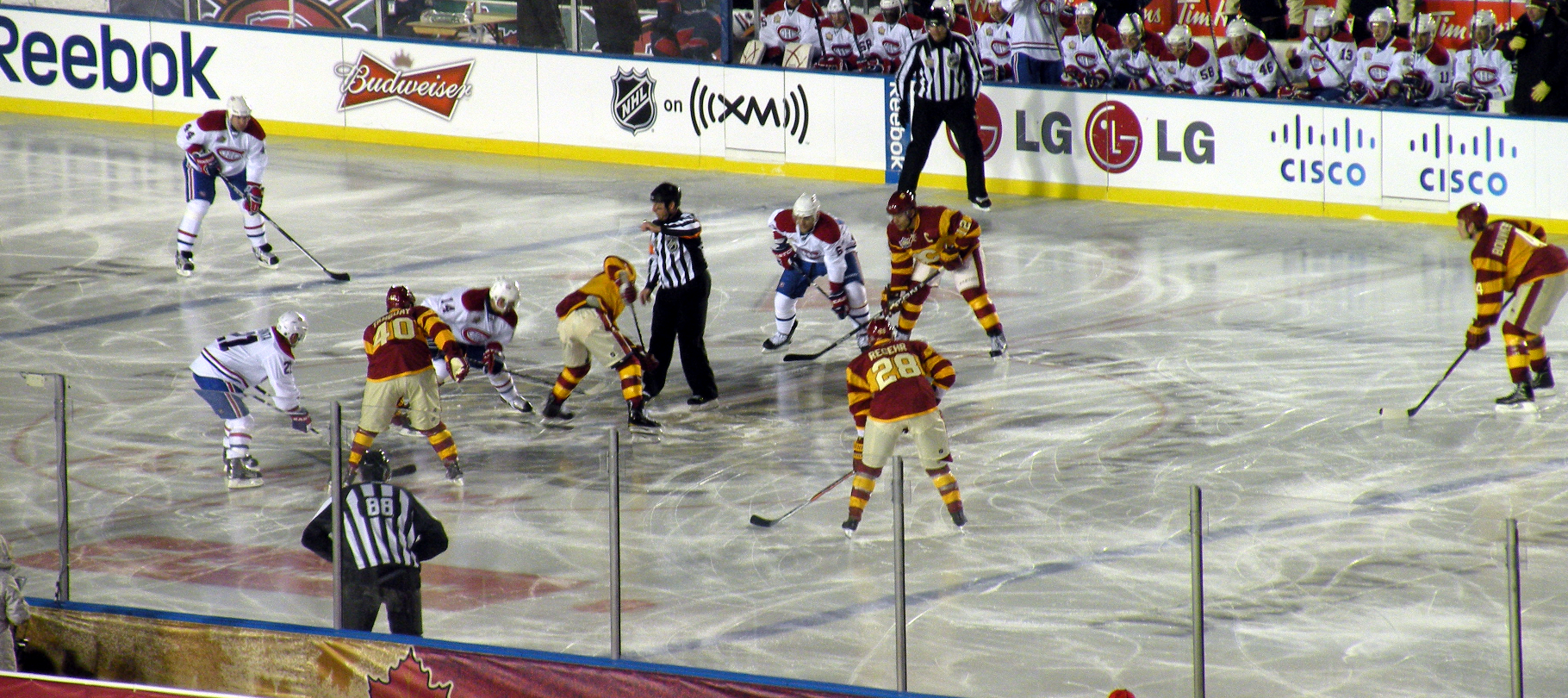
The Flames and Canadiens line up for a faceoff at the Heritage Classic

On February 7, 2011, Exactly 100 days after the Flames last held a playoff position, they climbed back into the top eight with a 7–0–1 run that culminated in a 3–1 victory over the defending Stanley Cup champion Chicago Blackhawks. Jokinen tied a franchise record for points in a period during a February 14 game against the Colorado Avalanche when he scored four points in the first period of a 9–1 win. The last Flame to accomplish the feat was Al MacInnis in 1991. The victory also marked Kiprusoff's 250th win as a member of the Flames.

The Flames hosted the Montreal Canadiens at McMahon Stadium in February for the 2011 Heritage Classic. The game was played before 41,022 fans who braved a windchill as cold as −21 °C (−6 °F). Calgary won the game, 4–0, on the strength of Bourque's two goals, including the 100th of his career. Kiprusoff became the first goaltender in NHL history to record a shutout at an outdoor game, and his play remained strong following the Heritage Classic, as he shut the Blues out in back-to-back games on February 27 (a 1–0 shutout) and March 1 (a 6–0 shutout). After losing 6–4 to the Blackhawks that resulted in the Flames dropping from fifth to sixth and a 3–0 win by the Nashville Predators against the Vancouver Canucks followed by a 1–0 victory by the Los Angeles Kings over the Phoenix Coyotes on March 3, resulting in the Flames dropping from sixth down to eighth, Kiprusoff then became the first goaltender in 25 years to stop two penalty shots in one game to lead the Flames to a 4–3 win over the Blue Jackets on March 4 as the Flames moved from eighth back up to fifth place in the West. Two nights later, in a 3–2 win over the Nashville Predators, Iginla scored his 30th goal of the season on a penalty shot against Pekka Rinne. In doing so, he became the 10th player in NHL history to score at least 30 goals in ten consecutive seasons.

Jay Bouwmeester, the NHL's active "ironman" leader, broke Karlis Skrastins' league record for consecutive games played by a defenceman when he appeared in his 496th consecutive game on March 15 against the Phoenix Coyotes, where the Flames lost 4–3. Bouwmeester last missed a game in the 2003–04 season when he suffered a broken foot. He remained 400 games behind Garry Unger's overall record of 914 consecutive games played.

A period of struggle through the middle part of March saw the Flames drop back out of a playoff spot. A 5–4 shootout victory over the Oilers on March 26 represented only their second win in eight games. While they ended that night at ninth in the west, just one point behind the defending Stanley Cup champion and eighth place Blackhawks, Chicago had played three fewer games at that point. A controversial loss to the Ducks on March 30 left Calgary three points behind Chicago with four games to play. The Flames had an apparent tying goal disallowed after Anaheim's Ryan Getzlaf appeared to pull the puck out of the net in a game the Ducks went on to win 4–2.

The Flames gained a boost when it was announced that injured forward Daymond Langkow had been cleared to return to action on April 1 against the Blues. It was Langkow's first game in over a year after suffering cracked vertebrae in his neck late in the 2009–10 season. Langkow recorded an assist in that game, a 3–2 victory. Iginla was involved in all three goals for Calgary; his second goal of the night, and game winner, was the 1,000th point of his NHL career. The Flames were eliminated from contention on April 6, finishing tenth in the West after the Blackhawks defeated the Blues 4–3 and the Anaheim Ducks defeated the Sharks 6–2 the same day.

== Playoffs ==
Though the Flames won their third consecutive game in April with a 6–1 victory over Edmonton, victories the same night by the Ducks and Blackhawks officially eliminated Calgary from playoff contention. Individually, Iginla recorded his 12th career hat trick to reach the 40 goal mark for the fourth time in his career while Kiprusoff tied Mike Vernon's franchise record of 262 wins. The Flames ended their season with an overtime loss to the Canucks. Though they ended the year second in the Northwest Division, the Flames finished tenth in the Western Conference, three points behind the eighth place Blackhawks.

Several coaches were released by the organization at the conclusion of the season. Goaltender coach Jamie McLennan and video coach Rob Cookson were the first to be let go. McLennan had joined the coaching staff in 2009 after retiring as a player, while Cookson had been a member of the Flames' staff for nine years. Assistant Ryan McGill was later let go, while assistant Dave Lowry was the only member of Brent Sutter's staff who was retained by the Flames.

While several players were invited to participate in the 2011 IIHF World Championship, Jarome Iginla, Jay Bouwmeester, Mark Giordano, Curtis Glencross and Alex Tanguay all turned down invitations to play for Canada for various reasons. Mikael Backlund and prospect Tim Erixon both played for Sweden. The pair won silver medals after Sweden was defeated by Finland in the championship final.

== Schedule and results ==
=== Pre-season ===
2010 pre-season game log: 7–0–0 (Home: 4–0–0; Road: 2–0–0; Neutral 1–0–0)
| # | Date | Visitor | Score | Home | OT | Decision | Attendance | Record |
| 1 | September 21 | Vancouver | 2–3 | Calgary | | Irving | 19,289 | 1–0–0 |
| 2 | September 21 | Calgary | 3–1 | Vancouver | | Karlsson | 18,810 | 2–0–0 |
| 3 | September 25 | Tampa Bay | 4–5 | Calgary | SO | Keetley | 19,289 | 3–0–0 |
| 4 | September 28 | Phoenix | 1–3 | Calgary | | Karlsson | 19,289 | 4–0–0 |
| 5 | September 29 (at Saskatoon, SK) | Calgary | 3–2 | NY Islanders | | Kiprusoff | 8,345 | 5–0–0 |
| 6 | October 1 | Calgary | 5–1 | Edmonton | | Karlsson | 16,839 | 6–0–0 |
| 7 | October 3 | Edmonton | 0–1 | Calgary | | Kiprusoff | 19,289 | 7–0–0 |
Legend: Win Loss Overtime/shootout loss

=== Regular season ===
2010–11 game log

October: 6–5–0 (Home: 4–3–0; Road: 2–2–0)
| # | Date | Visitor | Score | Home | OT | Decision | Attendance | Record | Pts |
| 1 | October 7 | Calgary | 0–4 | Edmonton | | Kiprusoff | 16,839 | 0–1–0 | 0 |
| 2 | October 10 | Los Angeles | 1–3 | Calgary | | Kiprusoff | 19,289 | 1–1–0 | 2 |
| 3 | October 14 | Florida | 3–0 | Calgary | | Kiprusoff | 19,289 | 1–2–0 | 2 |
| 4 | October 16 | Edmonton | 3–5 | Calgary | | Kiprusoff | 19,289 | 2–2–0 | 4 |
| 5 | October 19 | Calgary | 1–0 | Nashville | OT | Kiprusoff | 15,684 | 3–2–0 | 6 |
| 6 | October 21 | Calgary | 2–4 | Detroit | | Kiprusoff | 18,399 | 3–3–0 | 6 |
| 7 | October 22 | Calgary | 6–2 | Columbus | | Karlsson | 10,784 | 4–3–0 | 8 |
| 8 | October 24 | San Jose | 0–4 | Calgary | | Kiprusoff | 19,289 | 5–3–0 | 10 |
| 9 | October 26 | Edmonton | 4–5 | Calgary | SO | Kiprusoff | 19,289 | 6–3–0 | 12 |
| 10 | October 28 | Colorado | 6–5 | Calgary | | Karlsson | 19,289 | 6–4–0 | 12 |
| 11 | October 30 | Washington | 7–2 | Calgary | | Kiprusoff | 19,289 | 6–5–0 | 12 |

November: 4–7–2 (Home: 2–2–0; Road: 2–5–2)
| # | Date | Visitor | Score | Home | OT | Decision | Attendance | Record | Pts |
| 12 | November 3 | Detroit | 2–1 | Calgary | | Kiprusoff | 19,289 | 6–6–0 | 12 |
| 13 | November 5 | Calgary | 1–2 | Minnesota | | Kiprusoff | 17,124 | 6–7–0 | 12 |
| 14 | November 9 | Calgary | 4–2 | Colorado | | Kiprusoff | 12,219 | 7–7–0 | 14 |
| 15 | November 12 | Calgary | 4–5 | Phoenix | | Kiprusoff | 11,117 | 7–8–0 | 14 |
| 16 | November 13 | Calgary | 3–4 | San Jose | | Kiprusoff | 17,562 | 7–9–0 | 14 |
| 17 | November 17 | Phoenix | 3–1 | Calgary | | Kiprusoff | 19,289 | 7–10–0 | 14 |
| 18 | November 19 | Chicago | 2–7 | Calgary | | Kiprusoff | 19,289 | 8–10–0 | 16 |
| 19 | November 21 | Calgary | 4–5 | Detroit | OT | Kiprusoff | 18,399 | 8–10–1 | 17 |
| 20 | November 22 | Calgary | 1–2 | NY Rangers | | Kiprusoff | 17,845 | 8–11–1 | 17 |
| 21 | November 24 | Calgary | 1–2 | New Jersey | SO | Karlsson | 13,202 | 8–11–2 | 18 |
| 22 | November 26 | Calgary | 3–2 | Philadelphia | SO | Kiprusoff | 19,872 | 9–11–2 | 20 |
| 23 | November 27 | Calgary | 1–4 | Pittsburgh | | Kiprusoff | 18,317 | 9–12–2 | 20 |
| 24 | November 29 | Minnesota | 0–3 | Calgary | | Kiprusoff | 19,289 | 10–12–2 | 22 |

December: 7–6–1 (Home: 5–2–0; Road: 2–4–1)
| # | Date | Visitor | Score | Home | OT | Decision | Attendance | Record | Pts |
| 25 | December 1 | Vancouver | 7–2 | Calgary | | Kiprusoff | 19,289 | 10–13–2 | 22 |
| 26 | December 3 | Calgary | 3–2 | Minnesota | SO | Karlsson | 17,130 | 11–13–2 | 24 |
| 27 | December 5 | Calgary | 2–4 | Chicago | | Kiprusoff | 21,112 | 11–14–2 | 24 |
| 28 | December 7 | Tampa Bay | 2–4 | Calgary | | Kiprusoff | 19,289 | 12–14–2 | 26 |
| 29 | December 9 | Calgary | 1–2 | Los Angeles | | Kiprusoff | 18,118 | 12–15–2 | 26 |
| 30 | December 10 | Calgary | 2–3 | Anaheim | SO | Kiprusoff | 13,775 | 12–15–3 | 27 |
| 31 | December 13 | Columbus | 2–3 | Calgary | OT | Kiprusoff | 19,289 | 13–15–3 | 29 |
| 32 | December 16 | Toronto | 2–5 | Calgary | | Kiprusoff | 19,289 | 14–15–3 | 31 |
| 33 | December 18 | Minnesota | 3–1 | Calgary | | Kiprusoff | 19,289 | 14–16–3 | 31 |
| 34 | December 20 | Calgary | 1–4 | Minnesota | | Kiprusoff | 18,315 | 14–17–3 | 31 |
| 35 | December 21 | Calgary | 1–3 | Columbus | | Karlsson | 12,443 | 14–18–3 | 31 |
| 36 | December 23 | Calgary | 3–2 | Dallas | SO | Kiprusoff | 15,520 | 15–18–3 | 33 |
| 37 | December 27 | Buffalo | 2–5 | Calgary | | Kiprusoff | 19,289 | 16–18–3 | 35 |
| 38 | December 31 | Colorado | 2–3 | Calgary | | Kiprusoff | 19,289 | 17–18–3 | 37 |

January: 7–3–3 (Home: 3–2–1; Road: 4–1–2)
| # | Date | Visitor | Score | Home | OT | Decision | Attendance | Record | Pts |
| 39 | January 1 | Calgary | 2–1 | Edmonton | | Kiprusoff | 16,839 | 18–18–3 | 39 |
| 40 | January 3 | NY Islanders | 5–2 | Calgary | | Karlsson | 19,289 | 18–19–3 | 39 |
| 41 | January 5 | Calgary | 1–3 | Vancouver | | Kiprusoff | 18,860 | 18–20–3 | 39 |
| 42 | January 7 | Detroit | 5–4 | Calgary | SO | Kiprusoff | 19,289 | 18–20–4 | 40 |
| 43 | January 11 | Calgary | 5–6 | Carolina | SO | Karlsson | 10,096 | 18–20–5 | 41 |
| 44 | January 14 | Calgary | 3–2 | Ottawa | | Karlsson | 19,984 | 19–20–5 | 43 |
| 45 | January 15 | Calgary | 2–1 | Toronto | SO | Kiprusoff | 19,462 | 20–20–5 | 45 |
| 46 | January 17 | Calgary | 4–5 | Montreal | OT | Karlsson | 21,273 | 20–20–6 | 46 |
| 47 | January 19 | Minnesota | 6–0 | Calgary | | Kiprusoff | 19,289 | 20–21–6 | 46 |
| 48 | January 21 | Dallas | 4–7 | Calgary | | Karlsson | 19,289 | 21–21–6 | 48 |
| 49 | January 22 | Calgary | 4–3 | Vancouver | SO | Kiprusoff | 18,860 | 22–21–6 | 50 |
| 50 | January 24 | Nashville | 1–3 | Calgary | | Kiprusoff | 19,289 | 23–21–6 | 52 |
| 51 | January 26 | St. Louis | 1–4 | Calgary | | Kiprusoff | 19,289 | 24–21–6 | 54 |

February: 8–2–3 (Home: 5–1–3; Road: 3–1–0)
| # | Date | Visitor | Score | Home | OT | Decision | Attendance | Record | Pts |
| 52 | February 1 | Calgary | 3–2 | Nashville | SO | Kiprusoff | 14,360 | 25–21–6 | 56 |
| 53 | February 3 | Calgary | 4–2 | Atlanta | | Kiprusoff | 12,984 | 26–21–6 | 58 |
| 54 | February 5 | Los Angeles | 4–3 | Calgary | SO | Kiprusoff | 19,289 | 26–21–7 | 59 |
| 55 | February 7 | Chicago | 1–3 | Calgary | | Kiprusoff | 19,289 | 27–21–7 | 61 |
| 56 | February 9 | Ottawa | 2–5 | Calgary | | Kiprusoff | 19,289 | 28–21–7 | 63 |
| 57 | February 11 | Anaheim | 5–4 | Calgary | OT | Kiprusoff | 19,289 | 28–21–8 | 64 |
| 58 | February 12 | Calgary | 2–4 | Vancouver | | Kiprusoff | 18,860 | 28–22–8 | 64 |
| 59 | February 14 | Calgary | 9–1 | Colorado | | Kiprusoff | 14,035 | 29–22–8 | 66 |
| 60 | February 16 | Dallas | 2–4 | Calgary | | Kiprusoff | 19,289 | 30–22–8 | 68 |
| 61 | February 20 at McMahon Stadium | Montreal | 0–4 | Calgary | | Kiprusoff | 41,022 | 31–22–8 | 70 |
| 62 | February 22 | Boston | 3–1 | Calgary | | Kiprusoff | 19,289 | 31–23–8 | 70 |
| 63 | February 25 | San Jose | 4–3 | Calgary | SO | Kiprusoff | 19,289 | 31–23–9 | 71 |
| 64 | February 27 | St. Louis | 0–1 | Calgary | | Kiprusoff | 19,289 | 32–23–9 | 73 |

March: 6–6–2 (Home: 3–3–0; Road: 3–3–2)
| # | Date | Visitor | Score | Home | OT | Decision | Attendance | Record | Pts |
| 65 | March 1 | Calgary | 6–0 | St. Louis | | Kiprusoff | 19,150 | 33–23–9 | 75 |
| 66 | March 2 | Calgary | 4–6 | Chicago | | Karlsson | 20,896 | 33–24–9 | 75 |
| 67 | March 4 | Columbus | 3–4 | Calgary | | Kiprusoff | 19,289 | 34–24–9 | 77 |
| 68 | March 6 | Nashville | 2–3 | Calgary | | Kiprusoff | 19,289 | 35–24–9 | 79 |
| 69 | March 9 | Calgary | 4–3 | Dallas | SO | Kiprusoff | 14,476 | 36–24–9 | 81 |
| 70 | March 10 | Calgary | 0–3 | Phoenix | | Karlsson | 13,003 | 36–25–9 | 81 |
| 71 | March 12 | Vancouver | 4–3 | Calgary | | Kiprusoff | 19,289 | 36–26–9 | 81 |
| 72 | March 15 | Phoenix | 4–3 | Calgary | | Kiprusoff | 19,289 | 36–27–9 | 81 |
| 73 | March 17 | Colorado | 2–5 | Calgary | | Kiprusoff | 19,289 | 37–27–9 | 83 |
| 74 | March 20 | Calgary | 4–5 | Anaheim | OT | Karlsson | 15,177 | 37–27–10 | 84 |
| 75 | March 21 | Calgary | 1–2 | Los Angeles | SO | Kiprusoff | 18,118 | 37–27–11 | 85 |
| 76 | March 23 | Calgary | 3–6 | San Jose | | Kiprusoff | 17,562 | 37–28–11 | 85 |
| 77 | March 26 | Calgary | 5–4 | Edmonton | SO | Kiprusoff | 16,839 | 38–28–11 | 87 |
| 78 | March 30 | Anaheim | 4–2 | Calgary | | Kiprusoff | 19,289 | 38–29–11 | 87 |

April: 3–0–1 (Home: 1–0–1; Road: 2–0–0)
| # | Date | Visitor | Score | Home | OT | Decision | Attendance | Record | Pts |
| 79 | April 1 | Calgary | 3–2 | St. Louis | | Kiprusoff | 19,150 | 39–29–11 | 89 |
| 80 | April 3 | Calgary | 2–1 | Colorado | | Kiprusoff | 13,896 | 40–29–11 | 91 |
| 81 | April 6 | Edmonton | 1–6 | Calgary | | Kiprusoff | 19,289 | 41–29–11 | 93 |
| 82 | April 9 | Vancouver | 3–2 | Calgary | OT | Karlsson | 19,289 | 41–29–12 | 94 |

Legend: Win (2 points) Loss (0 points) Overtime/shootout loss (1 point)

== Player statistics ==
=== Skaters ===
Note: GP = Games played; G = Goals; A = Assists; Pts = Points; +/− = Plus/minus; PIM = Penalty minutes

Regular season

| Player | GP | G | A | Pts | +/− | PIM |
|---|---|---|---|---|---|---|
| Jarome Iginla | 82 | 43 | 43 | 86 | 0 | 40 |
| Alex Tanguay | 79 | 22 | 47 | 69 | 0 | 24 |
| Olli Jokinen | 79 | 17 | 37 | 54 | −17 | 44 |
| Rene Bourque | 80 | 27 | 23 | 50 | −17 | 42 |
| Curtis Glencross | 79 | 24 | 19 | 43 | 6 | 59 |
| Brendan Morrison | 66 | 9 | 34 | 43 | 13 | 16 |
| Mark Giordano | 82 | 8 | 35 | 43 | −8 | 67 |
| Matt Stajan | 76 | 6 | 25 | 31 | 1 | 32 |
| David Moss | 58 | 17 | 13 | 30 | 9 | 18 |
| Niklas Hagman | 71 | 11 | 16 | 27 | −2 | 24 |
| Anton Babchuk^{†} | 65 | 8 | 19 | 27 | 18 | 20 |
| Mikael Backlund | 73 | 10 | 15 | 25 | 4 | 18 |
| Jay Bouwmeester | 82 | 4 | 20 | 24 | −2 | 44 |
| Tim Jackman | 82 | 10 | 13 | 23 | 4 | 86 |
| Cory Sarich | 76 | 4 | 13 | 17 | 11 | 75 |
| Robyn Regehr | 79 | 2 | 15 | 17 | 2 | 58 |
| Tom Kostopoulos^{†} | 59 | 7 | 7 | 14 | −3 | 44 |
| Steve Staios | 39 | 3 | 7 | 10 | 6 | 24 |
| Adam Pardy | 30 | 1 | 6 | 7 | 3 | 24 |
| Ales Kotalik | 26 | 4 | 2 | 6 | −7 | 8 |
| Ian White^{‡} | 16 | 2 | 4 | 6 | −10 | 6 |
| Craig Conroy | 18 | 2 | 0 | 2 | −1 | 8 |
| Stefan Meyer | 16 | 0 | 2 | 2 | 0 | 17 |
| Lance Bouma | 16 | 0 | 1 | 1 | −1 | 2 |
| Greg Nemisz | 6 | 0 | 1 | 1 | −1 | 0 |
| Brett Sutter^{‡} | 4 | 0 | 1 | 1 | −1 | 5 |
| Brendan Mikkelson^{†} | 19 | 0 | 1 | 1 | −5 | 2 |
| Daymond Langkow | 4 | 0 | 1 | 1 | 3 | 0 |
| Fredrik Modin^{†} | 4 | 0 | 0 | 0 | −3 | 2 |
| Raitis Ivanans | 1 | 0 | 0 | 0 | −1 | 5 |
| Brett Carson^{†} | 6 | 0 | 0 | 0 | 2 | 0 |
| T. J. Brodie | 3 | 0 | 0 | 0 | −3 | 2 |

=== Goaltenders ===
Note: GP = Games played; TOI = Time on ice (minutes); W = Wins; L = Losses; OT = Overtime losses; GA = Goals against; GAA= Goals against average; SA= Shots against; SV= Saves; Sv% = Save percentage; SO= Shutouts

Regular season

| Player | GP | TOI | W | L | OT | GA | GAA | SA | Sv% | SO | G | A | PIM |
|---|---|---|---|---|---|---|---|---|---|---|---|---|---|
| Miikka Kiprusoff | 71 | 4156 | 37 | 24 | 6 | 182 | 2.63 | 1935 | .906 | 6 | 0 | 1 | 2 |
| Henrik Karlsson | 17 | 838 | 4 | 5 | 6 | 36 | 2.58 | 391 | .908 | 0 | 0 | 0 | 0 |

^{†}Denotes player spent time with another team before joining Flames. Stats reflect time with the Flames only.
^{‡}Traded mid-season
Bold/italics denotes franchise record

== Awards and honours ==
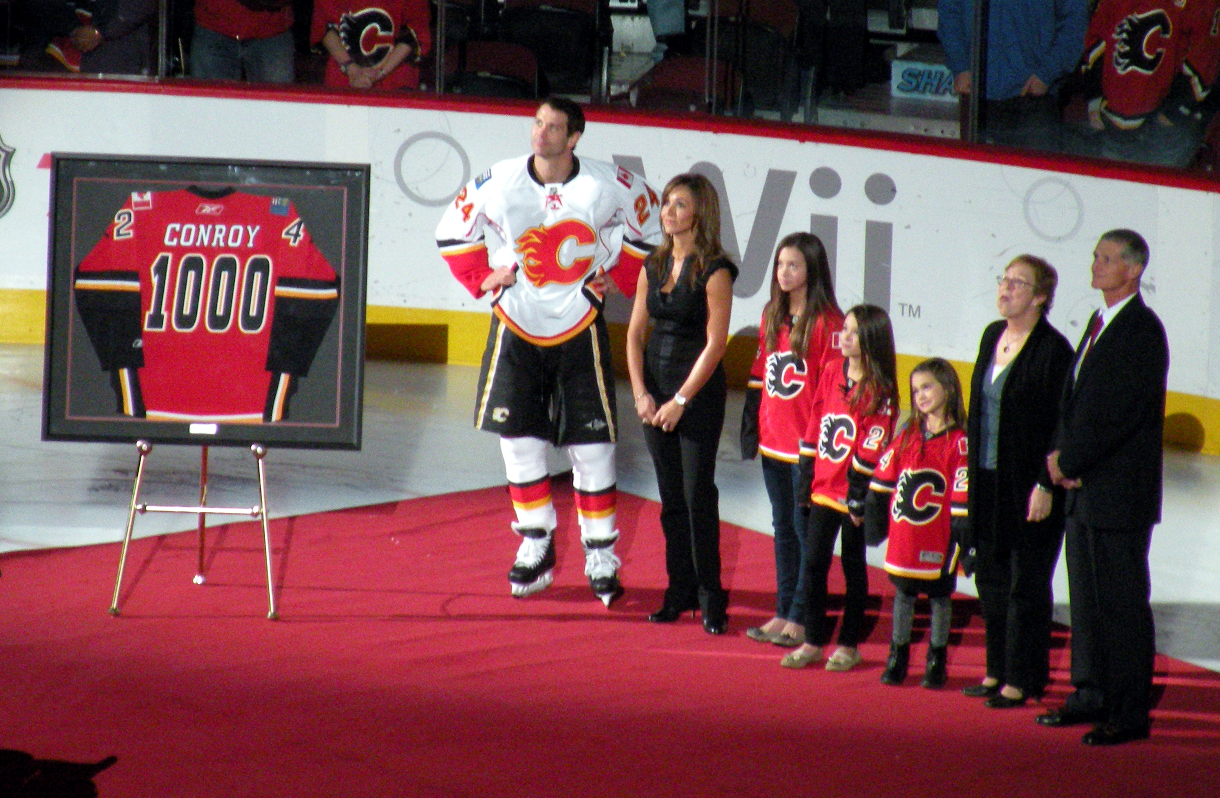
Conroy, pictured with his family, is honoured prior to playing his 1,000th career game

The NHL announced on June 22, 2010, that late owner Doc Seaman had been inducted into the Hockey Hall of Fame in the builder's category. Seaman was one of the original owners who brought the team to the city, played a key role in the construction of the Olympic Saddledome and in bringing the 1988 Winter Olympics to Calgary.

Several players reached major games played milestones in October. Rookie defenceman T. J. Brodie and goaltender Henrik Karlsson both played their first NHL games, while Karlsson earned his first win at the same time. Meanwhile, veteran defencemen Robyn Regehr and Cory Sarich each played their 800th games.

Thirty-nine-year-old Craig Conroy became the second-oldest player in NHL history to play 1,000 games on October 28. The talkative forward began his NHL career in 1995 with the Montreal Canadiens and after playing with the St. Louis Blues for several seasons, was acquired by Calgary in 2001 in a trade that was initially unpopular in Calgary. Conroy has since become one of the Flames' most popular players. He played only nine more games before announcing his retirement as a player to join the Flames' front office as an assistant to General Manager Jay Feaster.

Daymond Langkow was named a finalist for the Bill Masterton Memorial Trophy, awarded to the player who "best exemplifies the qualities of perseverance, sportsmanship and dedication to hockey". He was nominated after making his return to the Flames lineup one year after a slapshot to the neck left him with broken vertebrae. Ray Emery of the Anaheim Ducks and Ian Laperriere of the Philadelphia Flyers were also named finalists for the award.

=== Awards ===
| Player | Award |
|---|---|
League awards
| Rene Bourque | First Star of the Week (October 18–24) |
| Jarome Iginla | First Star of the Week (February 28 – March 6) |
| Jarome Iginla | Second Star of the Week (March 28 – April 3) |
Team awards
| Jarome Iginla | Molson Cup |
| Cory Sarich | Ralph T. Scurfield Humanitarian Award |
| Tim Jackman | J. R. "Bud" McCaig Award |

=== Milestones ===
| Player | Milestone | Reached |
|---|---|---|
| T. J. Brodie | 1st NHL game | October 7, 2010 |
| Curtis Glencross | 100th NHL point | October 10, 2010 |
| Brett Sutter | 1st NHL assist | October 10, 2010 |
| Steve Staios | 900th NHL game | October 19, 2010 |
| Henrik Karlsson | 1st NHL game 1st NHL win | October 22, 2010 |
| Stefan Meyer | 1st NHL assist 1st NHL point | October 24, 2010 |
| Craig Conroy | 1,000th NHL game | October 28, 2010 |
| | 10,000th goal in franchise history | November 26, 2010 |
| Olli Jokinen | 900th NHL game | November 26, 2010 |
| Rene Bourque | 100th NHL assist | December 3, 2010 |
| Miikka Kiprusoff | 250th NHL win | December 13, 2010 |
| Matt Stajan | 500th NHL game | December 20, 2010 |
| | 3,000th game in franchise history | January 3, 2011 |
| Tom Kostopoulos | 500th NHL game | January 7, 2011 |
| Jarome Iginla | 500th NHL assist | January 11, 2011 |
| Jay Bouwmeester | 600th NHL game | January 19, 2011 |
| Rene Bourque | 200th NHL point | January 14, 2011 |
| David Moss | 100th NHL point | January 21, 2011 |
| Miikka Kiprusoff | 500th NHL game | January 26, 2011 |
| Lance Bouma | 1st NHL game | February 5, 2011 |
| Lance Bouma | 1st NHL assist 1st NHL point | February 7, 2011 |
| Olli Jokinen | 600th NHL point | February 7, 2011 |
| Robyn Regehr | 800th NHL game | February 9, 2011 |
| Cory Sarich | 800th NHL game | February 11, 2011 |
| Rene Bourque | 100th NHL goal | February 21, 2011 |
| Alex Tanguay | 800th NHL game | February 27, 2011 |
| Mark Giordano | 100th NHL point | March 23, 2011 |
| Greg Nemisz | 1st NHL game | March 23, 2011 |
| Jarome Iginla | 1,000th NHL point | April 1, 2011 |
| Greg Nemisz | 1st NHL assist 1st NHL point | April 6, 2011 |

== Transactions ==
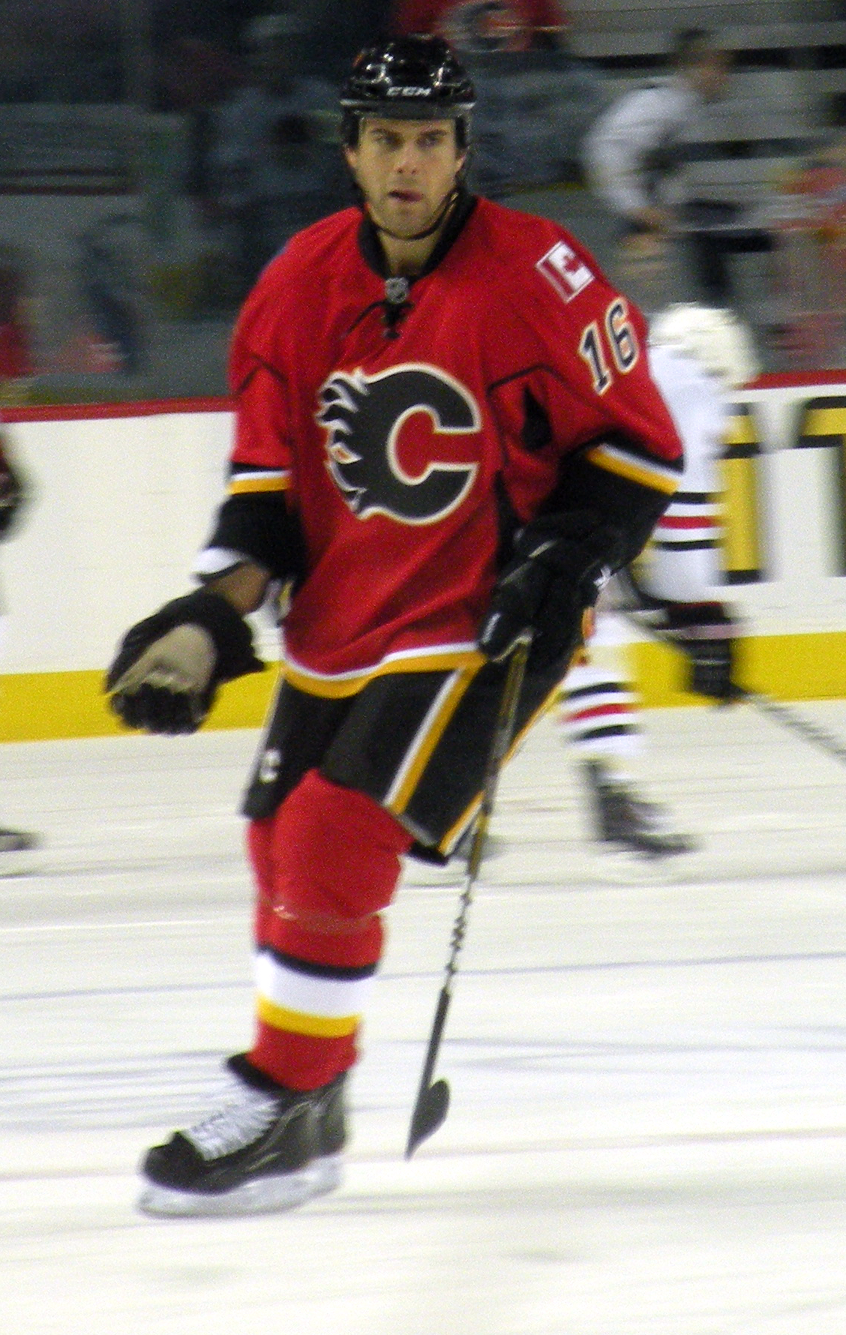
Tom Kostopoulos was acquired by the Flames in a mid-November trade

Two former Flames were brought back into the fold on the first day of the free agent signing period. Calgary first signed Alex Tanguay to a one-year, $1.7 million contract and then generated considerable debate by signing Olli Jokinen to a two-year, $6 million deal. The re-acquisition of Jokinen was especially surprising to fans and media alike, as the centre was shipped to the New York Rangers in a controversial trade only four months previous after a disappointing 2009–10 season in Calgary. The signing was sharply criticized by local and national media, though reaction amongst fans was mixed as polls suggested only a minority opposed the moves.

=== Trades ===
| June 26, 2010 | To Calgary Flames Henrik Karlsson | To San Jose Sharks 6th-round pick in 2010 – Konrad Abeltshauser |
| June 30, 2010 | To Calgary Flames Logan MacMillan | To Anaheim Ducks Jason Jaffray |
| November 17, 2010 | To Calgary Flames Anton Babchuk; Tom Kostopoulos | To Carolina Hurricanes Ian White; Brett Sutter |
| February 28, 2011 | To Calgary Flames Fredrik Modin | To Atlanta Thrashers 7th-round pick in 2011 – Colin Blackwell |

=== Additions and subtractions ===
Additions
| Player | Former team | Via |
|---|---|---|
| Alex Tanguay | Tampa Bay Lightning | Free agency |
| Olli Jokinen | New York Rangers | Free agency |
| Raitis Ivanans | Los Angeles Kings | Free agency |
| Tim Jackman | New York Islanders | Free agency |
| Ryan Stone | Edmonton Oilers | Free agency |
| Stefan Meyer | Phoenix Coyotes | Free agency |
| Brendan Morrison | Washington Capitals | Free agency |
| Brendan Mikkelson | Anaheim Ducks | Waivers |
| Brett Carson | Carolina Hurricanes | Waivers |

Subtractions
| Player | New team | Via |
|---|---|---|
| Eric Nystrom | Minnesota Wild | Free agency |
| Nigel Dawes | Atlanta Thrashers | Buy-out |
| Chris Higgins | Florida Panthers | Free agency |
| David Van der Gulik | Colorado Avalanche | Free agency |
| Brett Palin | Nashville Predators | Free agency |
| Jamal Mayers | San Jose Sharks | Free agency |
| Craig Conroy | N/A | Retirement |

== Draft picks ==
The Flames entered the 2010 NHL entry draft without a selection in the first two rounds. They would have picked 13th overall, however that pick was traded to the Phoenix Coyotes as part of a 2009 trade for Olli Jokinen. Their second round pick went to the Chicago Blackhawks as part of a 2008 deal in which Calgary acquired Rene Bourque. The Flames' first selection was early in the third round, a pick acquired from the Columbus Blue Jackets in exchange for Anton Stralman. They selected Max Reinhart with that pick. His father Paul was also a former Flames draft pick. Calgary made one trade at the draft, sending their sixth round pick (163rd overall) to the Sharks in exchange for goaltender Henrik Karlsson.

| Rnd | Pick | Player | Nat | Pos | Team (league) | NHL statistics | | | | |
| Rnd | Pick | Player | Nat | Pos | Team (league) | GP | G | A | Pts | PIM |
|---|---|---|---|---|---|---|---|---|---|---|
| 3 | 64 | Max Reinhart^{†} | Canada | C | Kootenay Ice (WHL) | 23 | 1 | 4 | 5 | 6 |
| 3 | 73 | Joey Leach | Canada | D | Kootenay Ice (WHL) | | | | | |
| 4 | 103 | John Ramage^{†} | Canada | D | University of Wisconsin (WCHA) | 1 | 0 | 0 | 0 | 0 |
| 4 | 108 | Bill Arnold | United States | C | U.S. National Team Development Program (USHL) | 1 | 0 | 0 | 0 | 0 |
| 5 | 133 | Micheal Ferland^{†} | Canada | LW | Brandon Wheat Kings (WHL) | 23 | 2 | 3 | 6 | 16 |
| 7 | 193 | Patrick Holland | Canada | RW | Tri-City Americans (WHL) | 5 | 0 | 0 | 0 | 0 |

Statistics are updated to the end of the 2014–15 NHL season. ^{†} denotes player was on an NHL roster in 2014–15.

== Abbotsford Heat ==
For the second year, the Flames' top affiliate was the Abbotsford Heat of the American Hockey League (AHL). The Heat finished the 2010–11 AHL season with a 38–32–4–6 record, fourth in the North Division, but failed to qualify for the Calder Cup playoffs. The Heat struggled offensively for much of the season; Matt Keith was the team's leading scorer at just 35 points, while T. J. Brodie and Jon Rheault had 34 points each. Brodie, a rookie, was the team's lone representative at the 2011 AHL All-Star Game. Leland Irving established himself as the team's top goaltender early in the year. His 30 wins was second in the AHL, and he led the league in shutouts with eight.

The uncertainty surrounding the NHL's Phoenix Coyotes and a possible relocation to Winnipeg resulted in speculation that the Heat would also be relocating. Vancouver radio station CKNW reported that if the Coyotes relocated, the Manitoba Moose would move to Abbotsford, and the Heat to the nearby community of Chilliwack. Flames president Ken King refuted the argument, noting that the Heat were in only their second year of a ten-year agreement with the City of Abbotsford.

== See also ==
- 2010–11 NHL season
