= 2011 NHL Heritage Classic =

Outdoor National Hockey League game

2011 Heritage Classic
| | 1 | 2 | 3 | Total |
|---|---|---|---|---|
| Montreal Canadiens | 0 | 0 | 0 | 0 |
| Calgary Flames | 1 | 2 | 1 | 4 |
- Date: February 20, 2011
- Venue: McMahon Stadium
- City: Calgary
- Attendance: 41,022

The 2011 Heritage Classic was a regular season outdoor National Hockey League (NHL) game between the Montreal Canadiens and the Calgary Flames. The game was played at McMahon Stadium in Calgary, Alberta, Canada, on February 20, 2011. The Flames defeated the Canadiens by a score of 4–0 before a crowd of 41,022 spectators. It was just the second time in six NHL outdoor games that the home team won.

It was the second Heritage Classic game, held seven seasons after the original. It was also the first time the NHL held two outdoor games in one season, as it followed the 2011 NHL Winter Classic in Pittsburgh. In spite of criticism that playing two such games in a season would lessen the spectacle, the Heritage Classic eclipsed all previous NHL outdoor games in sponsorship. The game's title sponsor was Tim Hortons.

Calgary goaltender Miikka Kiprusoff was named the game's first star after making 39 saves to record the first shutout in an NHL outdoor game. His teammates Rene Bourque and Alex Tanguay were the second and third stars respectively. Weather conditions were a major story during the game, as the wind chill made the temperature feel like −25 °C (−13 °F) on the ice, and forced the arena staff to manually flood the ice between periods to avoid damaging the ice surface.

The weekend featured numerous other games, which the Flames branded as the "Faceoff in the Foothills." It began on Friday, February 18 with an American Hockey League (AHL) matchup that saw Calgary's top minor league affiliate, the Abbotsford Heat, lose to the Oklahoma City Barons 3–1 at the Scotiabank Saddledome. An alumni game was held on the Saturday between a team composed mostly of players on Calgary's 1989 Stanley Cup-winning team against alumni of the Canadiens. It ended on Family Day Monday when the Regina Pats defeated the Calgary Hitmen in a Western Hockey League (WHL) game at McMahon that set a junior world attendance record of 20,888.

== Second outdoor game ==
The Heritage Classic was played two months after the 2011 Winter Classic. NHL Commissioner Gary Bettman stated the Winter Classic is designed for American television and to promote the game in the United States, but that the league sought to hold another game for its Canadian partners. He said the league delayed on hosting a second outdoor game until it felt it was capable of holding three significant events in a two-month span, including the All-Star Game.

Corporate support for the Heritage Classic exceeded expectations; Chief Operating Officer John Collins announced that the league had gained more sponsorship revenue for Calgary's game than it had the Winter Classic. While the league would not commit to holding a third Heritage Classic, Collins admitted that nearly every team had expressed interest in holding their own game and that title sponsor Tim Hortons had signed a multi-year deal with the league.

The league's decision to play two outdoor games in one season was met with criticism from Scott Burnside of ESPN, who argued the NHL risks diluting the unique nature of the outdoor events. He also argued that the Heritage Classic was the league's attempt to appease Canadian fans and media who were upset that all previous Winter Classics featured only American teams. Commissioner Gary Bettman dismissed both arguments as "absurd," but agreed that the two games are intended for different markets.

== Teams and venue ==
The Flames lobbied the NHL for the opportunity to host an outdoor game for some time. Team president Ken King said the fans consistently asked for such a game in Calgary, and the team quietly pressed the NHL for several years. They unsuccessfully sought to host a second outdoor game as part of a January 1 doubleheader with the 2010 NHL Winter Classic in Boston.

When the league finally approved Calgary for 2011, the team considered where to host the game. They thought about building temporary stadiums west of the city limits or in Lake Louise and hosting the game at the foot of the Canadian Rockies. The team dismissed the latter idea as impractical, and settled on McMahon Stadium. The usual home of the Calgary Stampeders and the University of Calgary Dinos football teams, McMahon has a standard capacity of 35,650 but additional seating added in the north end zone pushed the capacity for this game over 41,000.

It was the first outdoor game for the Flames in their franchise history but marked the second time the Canadiens participated in an NHL outdoor game. Montreal defeated the Edmonton Oilers in the original Heritage Classic, held in Edmonton in 2003.

The Flames were inundated with complaints from season ticket holders upset by their seat assignments and the cost of tickets. King responded to the concerns by noting that the league had purchased the game from the Flames, and the team was given a limited allotment of seats for its ticket holders. He also noted that it was possible that the event would lose money, even at ticket prices ranging between $49 and $249, but that the team brought the Heritage Classic to Calgary because the fans wanted the game to return to Canada. The Pittsburgh Penguins and Buffalo Sabres encountered similar issues allocating tickets for the Winter Classic.

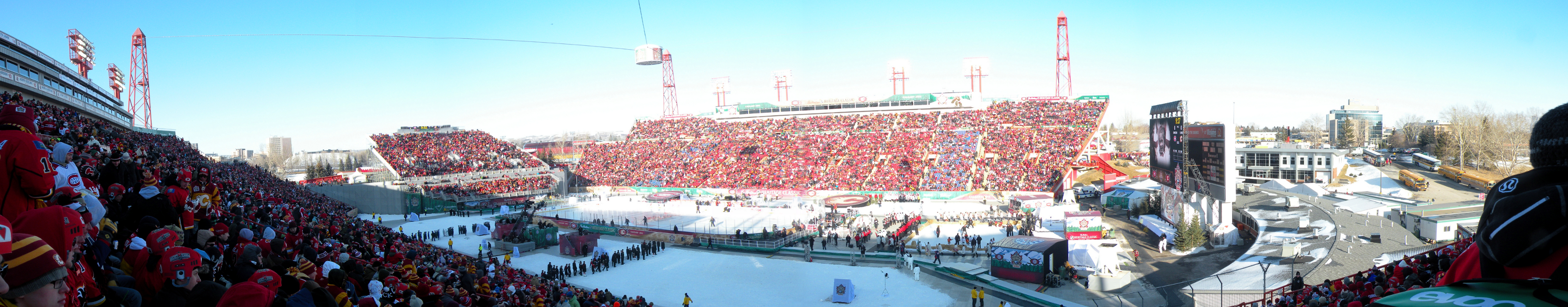
Panoramic view of McMahon Stadium prior to the game's start

== Uniforms ==
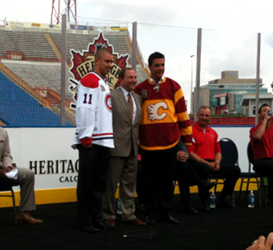
Josh Gorges, Gary Bettman and Steve Staios unveil the uniforms at a press conference announcing the game.

As with other outdoor games, special jerseys were worn for the event. The Flames' uniform was maroon with burnt yellow stripes and tan pants that were inspired by the uniforms worn by the Calgary Tigers of the 1920s. The Flames wore the uniform to pay homage to the first professional hockey team in the city's history. As members of the Western Canada Hockey League of the 1920s, the Tigers won the league championship in 1924 before losing that year's Stanley Cup Final to the Canadiens. Montreal wore a classic version of their usual road sweater, the difference was the blue block numbering with the red outline, what the team wore prior to 1997.

The Flames uniform received mixed reviews. Detractors compared the uniform to the outfit Ronald McDonald wears. They proved popular with fans, however; the league revealed a few days before the game that 16,000 Flames jerseys had been sold, compared to about 6,000 Montreal jerseys. Cheaper, unlicensed copies were widely available online and the Royal Canadian Mounted Police worked to stem the sale of counterfeit merchandise that was misrepresented as being authentic.

== Broadcasters ==
The Heritage Classic was telecast throughout North America. The Canadian Broadcasting Corporation (CBC) aired the game in English on Hockey Night in Canada, while Reseau des sports (RDS) carried the French-language broadcast in Canada. Versus aired the game in the United States. The game was offered on 3D television in both countries: by CBC in Canada as its second 3D game of the season, and on Xfinity 3D in the U.S. The game was the first event broadcast by Comcast's new 3D channel.

Though the game involved two Canadian teams, the NHL hoped that the event would prove a successful draw in the U.S. To that end, the league scheduled the Heritage Classic as the only game in prime time, while NBC debuted its Hockey Day in America with a pair of regional doubleheaders that led into the telecast; throughout NBC's telecast, commercials advised viewers to change to Versus for the Heritage Classic once the American games finished. University of Alberta sports economist Brad Humphreys questioned the league's ambitions, arguing that a game without an American team would not appeal. He stated that the game was being held to placate the Canadian audience, but noted that it was important for the NHL to keep the league's Canadian audience happy.

Nonetheless, the game drew strong ratings on both sides of the border. In Canada, the CBC averaged 2.1 million viewers with a peak of 2.9 million while RDS peaked at 1.6 million. In the United States, Versus averaged 608,000 viewers, and peaked above 700,000. For Versus, it represented the fourth-most watched regular season game in the network's history, and was the highest rated all-Canadian NHL game on an American cable channel since Nielsen began tracking such ratings.

== Entertainment ==
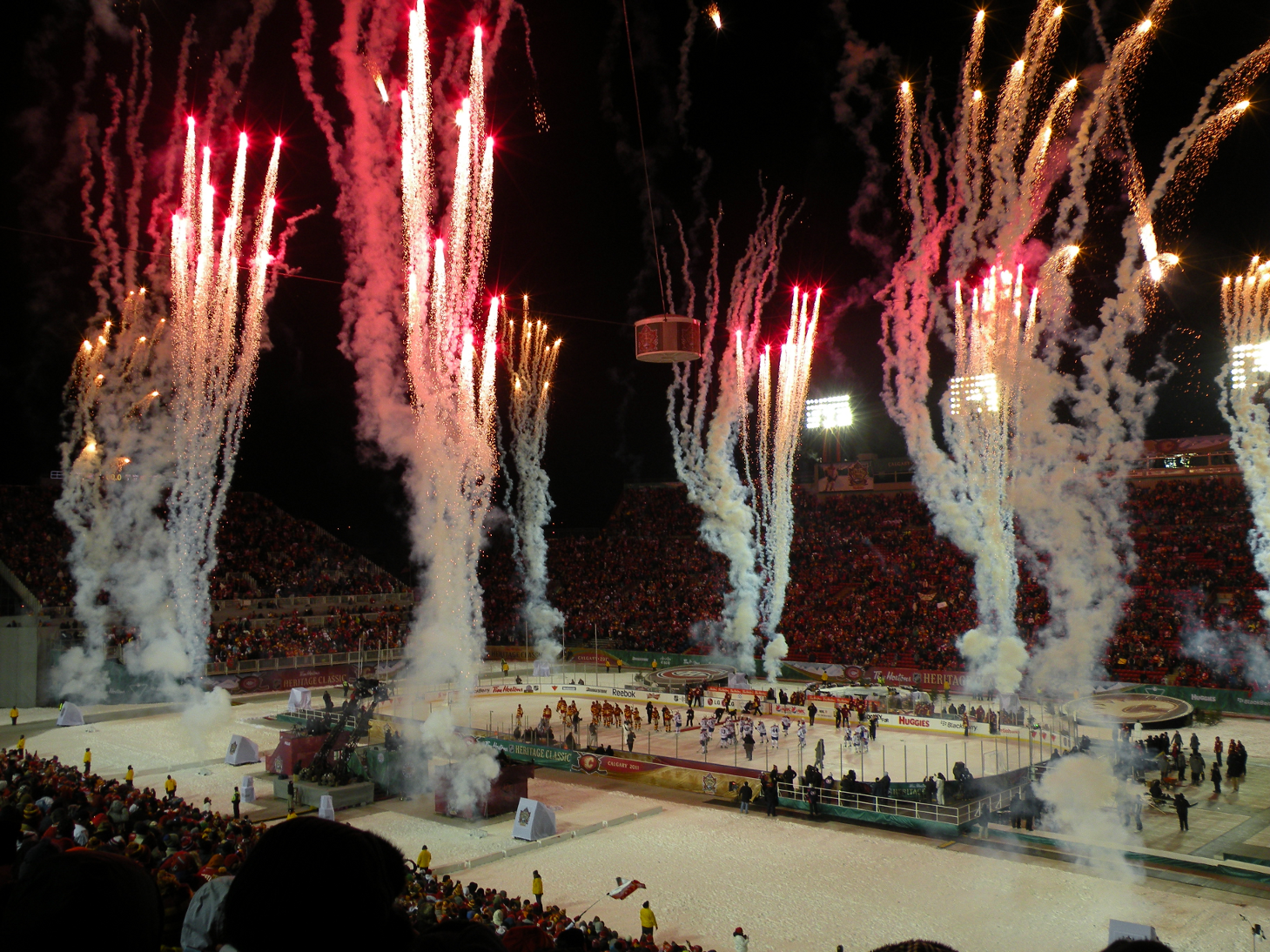
Fireworks following the game

In spite of the wind chill, fans arrived at McMahon several hours before the game to experience an 88,000 square feet (8,200 m^{2}) fan zone, and stood in line ups 100 people deep to buy Heritage Classic merchandise. The crowd maintained a party atmosphere throughout the game, with many fans describing the Classic as a "once in a lifetime show". A cover band provided entertainment out front of McMahon while fans played air hockey, enjoyed free coffee from title sponsor Tim Hortons and tried their hockey skills in interactive booths.

Several musical acts performed throughout the game. Five for Fighting performed his song "Chances" during the opening ceremonies. Canadian indie rock acts Tokyo Police Club and Metric performed during the first and second intermissions, respectively. Country duo Thompson Square performed the American national anthem (despite an American team not being the game's visiting team) and Calgary native Paul Brandt performed the Canadian national anthem. The Montreal Canadiens organization was unhappy with Brandt's rendition, filing a complaint with the NHL over the fact that he sang the English version of "O Canada" rather than the bilingual version. The league acknowledged the complaint, but took no action.

== Game play ==
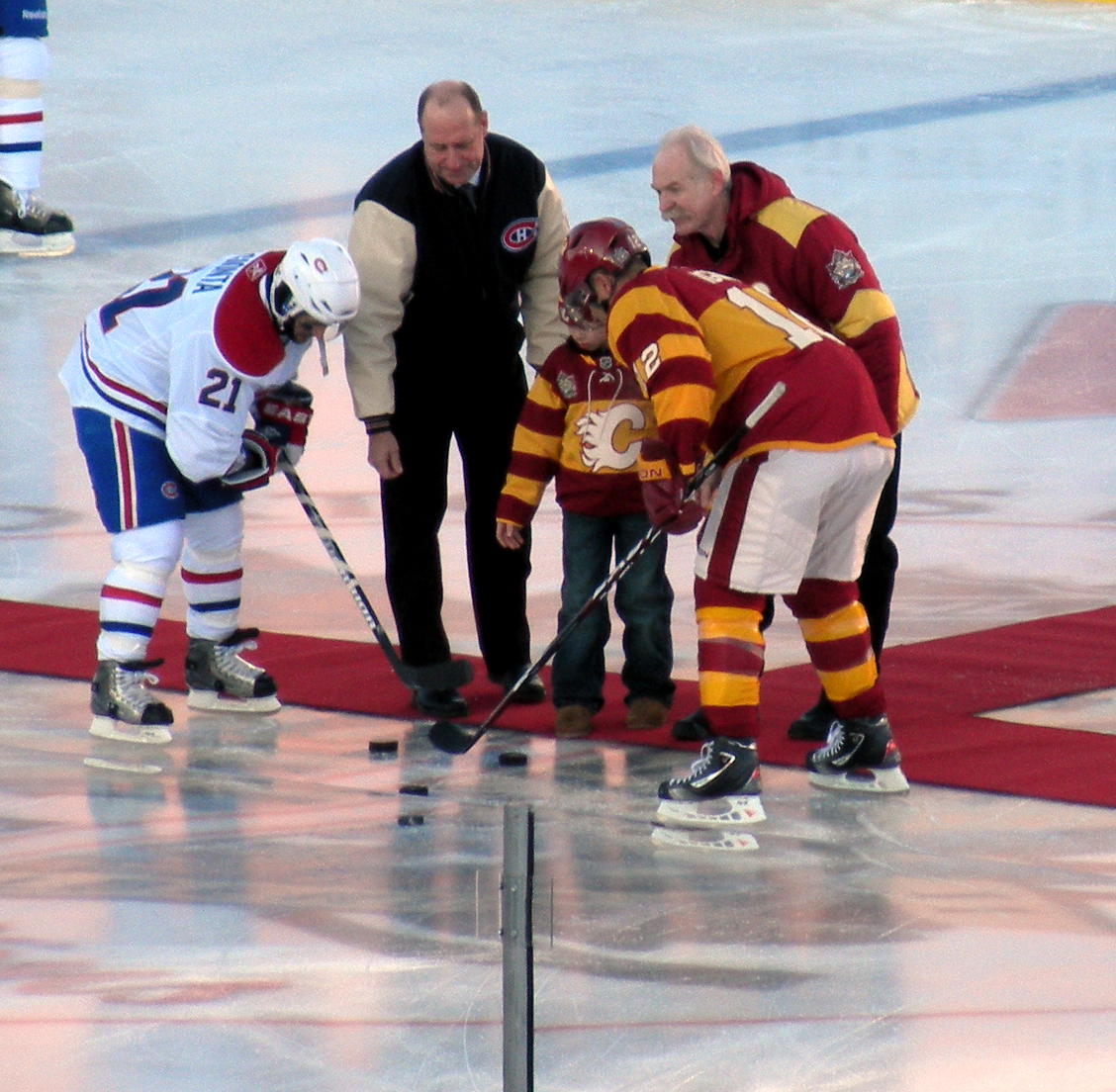
Hall of Famers Bob Gainey and Lanny McDonald perform the ceremonial faceoff.

The cold weather and ice conditions reduced the game to a slower speed than usual, with little physical play. Both teams struggled to deal with bouncing pucks, while arena staff were called out to fix patches of the ice on numerous occasions. Flames' defenceman Steve Staios stated that Calgary's strategy revolved around "keeping it simple and trying to play the game in straight lines". Montreal's James Wisniewski admitted after the game that the Canadiens struggled to adapt to the conditions.

The Flames dominated the first period of play, outshooting Montreal 19–8. Canadiens' goaltender Carey Price made several difficult saves early in the game, stopping a Rene Bourque one-timer from the top of the crease followed immediately by a save on Alex Tanguay, who tried to stuff the rebound into the net. Calgary was given an early two-man advantage after P. K. Subban and Hal Gill both took tripping penalties in the seventh minute of play. The Flames capitalized on the power play, as Tanguay slid a pass in front of the Montreal net that was deflected in by Bourque to give Calgary a 1–0 advantage.

The score remained unchanged until the second period. Montreal held the advantage in play for much of the frame, taking 21 shots on Miikka Kiprusoff. They earned their only power play opportunity of the game midway through the frame when Jay Bouwmeester was penalized for interference. The Flames had the better chances despite being shorthanded; Curtis Glencross was unable to deflect a pass into the net while rushing towards the Montreal goal, but fought to retrieve the puck and sent it back out front of the net, where Anton Babchuk snapped it behind Price to extend Calgary's lead to 2–0. Bourque made the score 3–0 with five minutes left in the period when he cut in front of Price from the left side of the ice and put the puck in before being sent airborne over the fallen goaltender's pads. The goal was the 100th of Bourque's career.

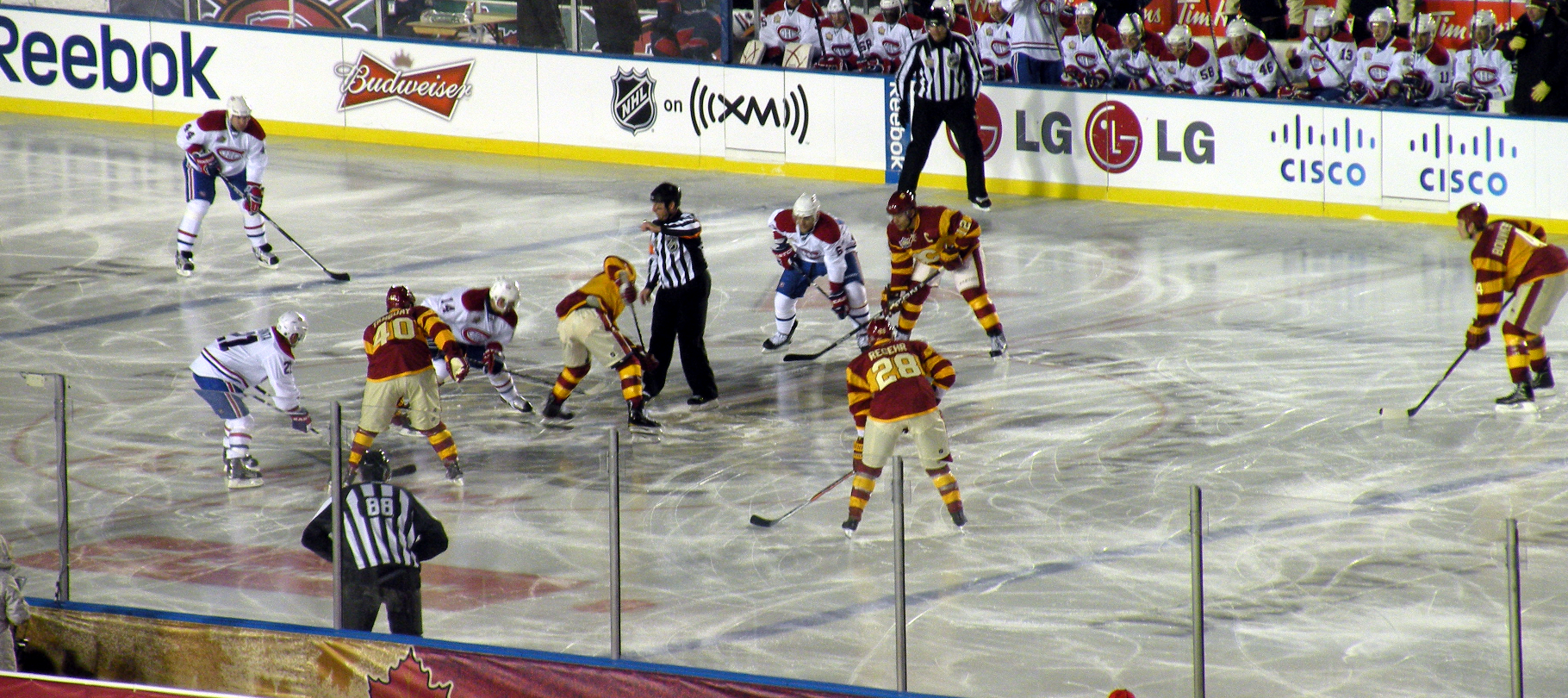
The teams line up to begin the third period.

The third period was relatively even. Montreal outshot Calgary 10–7 for the period, and 39–37 for the game. Roman Hamrlik sent the Flames to their fourth power play at 8:58 of the period, and the Flames capitalized a minute later when Jarome Iginla sent a pass over a sprawling Montreal defender to Tanguay, who was standing on top of the crease and tapped the puck into the net. Kiprusoff held Montreal off the scoreboard for the remainder of the game to record his fourth shutout of the season, and the first in the NHL's outdoor history. With the win, the Flames became only the second home team to win an NHL outdoor game, following the Boston Bruins, who won the 2010 Winter Classic at Fenway Park.

=== Weather ===
Calgary's unpredictable weather patterns impacted the game, as long term forecasts that called for relatively warm temperatures failed to materialize. An arctic front descended over the city in the week leading up to the game resulting in overnight temperatures as low as −20 °C (−4 °F), however the forecast called for daytime highs of −6 °C (21 °F) in time for the game's playing. The actual temperature was slightly colder, sitting at −8.6 °C (16.5 °F) at the game's start, but as the sun set and temperatures dropped, it felt as cold as −21 °C (−6 °F) with wind chill factored in. The temperature during the game was only slightly colder than Calgary's averages of 1 °C (34 °F) and −11 °C (12 °F) for the highs and lows.

The changing temperatures forced the ice crews to abandon the use of ice resurfacers for fear of damaging the playing surface. Instead, they manually flooded the ice between periods using a high-pressure hose and shovels. The players admitted that they were challenged by the condition of the ice, but praised the efforts of Dan Craig and his ice crew at quickly fixing areas of the surface that required patching. Flames defenceman Cory Sarich noted that while he had difficulty handling the puck, he was not concerned about the safety of the ice surface.

== Game summary ==
| Feb 20, 2011 | Montreal Canadiens | 0–4 | Calgary Flames | McMahon Stadium | Recap |

Scoring summary
| Period | Team | Goal | Assist(s) | Time | Score |
|---|---|---|---|---|---|
| 1st | CGY | Rene Bourque (18) – pp | Alex Tanguay (29) and Olli Jokinen (30) | 08:09 | 1–0 CGY |
| 2nd | CGY | Anton Babchuk (9) – sh | Curtis Glencross (13) and Brendan Morrison (29) | 12:44 | 2–0 CGY |
| 2nd | CGY | Rene Bourque (19) | Cory Sarich (10) | 14:46 | 3–0 CGY |
| 3rd | CGY | Alex Tanguay (16) – pp | Jarome Iginla (32) and Brendan Morrison (30) | 10:53 | 4–0 CGY |

Number in parentheses represents the player's total in goals or assists to that point of the season

Penalty summary
| Period | Team | Player | Penalty | Time | PIM |
|---|---|---|---|---|---|
| 1st | MTL | P. K. Subban | Tripping | 06:11 | 2:00 |
| 1st | MTL | Hal Gill | Tripping | 06:44 | 2:00 |
| 2nd | MTL | Roman Hamrlik | High-sticking | 00:45 | 2:00 |
| 2nd | CGY | Jay Bouwmeester | Interference | 10:59 | 2:00 |
| 3rd | MTL | Roman Hamrlik | Hooking | 08:58 | 2:00 |

Shots by period
| Team | 1 | 2 | 3 | Total |
|---|---|---|---|---|
| Montreal | 8 | 21 | 10 | 39 |
| Calgary | 19 | 11 | 7 | 37 |

Power play opportunities
| Team | Goals/Opportunities |
|---|---|
| Montreal | 0/1 |
| Calgary | 2/4 |

Three star selections
| | Team | Player | Statistics |
|---|---|---|---|
| 1st | CGY | Miikka Kiprusoff | 39 Saves, 1.000 SV% |
| 2nd | CGY | Rene Bourque | 2 goals |
| 3rd | CGY | Alex Tanguay | 1 goal, 1 assist |

== Team rosters ==
Several players on both teams had previously appeared in an outdoor game. For Calgary's David Moss, it was his third appearance outdoors. He previously played in the 2001 Cold War game as a member of the University of Michigan Wolverines, and again at the opening game of the 2010 IIHF World Championship, in which he played for Team USA. Teammate Steve Staios was a member of the Oilers at the first Heritage Classic, when the defenceman led both teams with three points (one goal, two assists). For the Canadiens, Michael Cammalleri was a teammate of Moss at the Cold war game, while defenceman James Wisniewski was a member of the Chicago Blackhawks when they hosted the 2009 NHL Winter Classic at Wrigley Field.

Montreal Canadiens (Loss, 31–22–7)
Head coach: Jacques Martin
| | Nat. | Player | Position | G | A | Pts | PIM | +/- | SOG |
| 11 | (United States) | Scott Gomez | C | 0 | 0 | 0 | 0 | E | 0 |
| 13 | (Canada) | Michael Cammalleri | LW | 0 | 0 | 0 | 0 | −1 | 3 |
| 14 | (Czech Republic) | Tomas Plekanec | C | 0 | 0 | 0 | 0 | −1 | 8 |
| 15 | (United States) | Jeff Halpern | C | 0 | 0 | 0 | 0 | E | 1 |
| 20 | (United States) | James Wisniewski | D | 0 | 0 | 0 | 0 | −1 | 1 |
| 21 | (United States) | Brian Gionta (C) | RW | 0 | 0 | 0 | 0 | −1 | 2 |
| 22 | (United States) | Paul Mara | D | 0 | 0 | 0 | 0 | E | 2 |
| 32 | (Canada) | Travis Moen | LW | 0 | 0 | 0 | 0 | E | 3 |
| 44 | (Czech Republic) | Roman Hamrlik | D | 0 | 0 | 0 | 4 | −1 | 1 |
| 46 | (Belarus) | Andrei Kostitsyn | LW | 0 | 0 | 0 | 0 | E | 3 |
| 53 | (Canada) | Ryan White | C | 0 | 0 | 0 | 0 | E | 0 |
| 57 | (Canada) | Benoit Pouliot | LW | 0 | 0 | 0 | 0 | E | 1 |
| 58 | (Canada) | David Desharnais | C | 0 | 0 | 0 | 0 | −1 | 1 |
| 67 | (United States) | Max Pacioretty | LW | 0 | 0 | 0 | 0 | −2 | 2 |
| 68 | (Switzerland) | Yannick Weber | D | 0 | 0 | 0 | 0 | −1 | 2 |
| 75 | (United States) | Hal Gill (A) | D | 0 | 0 | 0 | 2 | E | 3 |
| 76 | (Canada) | P. K. Subban | D | 0 | 0 | 0 | 2 | −1 | 5 |
| 81 | (Denmark) | Lars Eller | C | 0 | 0 | 0 | 0 | E | 1 |

| | Nat. | Goaltender | Result | Rec | GA | SA | SV | SV% | TOI |
|---|---|---|---|---|---|---|---|---|---|
| 31 | (Canada) | Carey Price | L | 27–19–6 | 4 | 37 | 33 | 0.891 | 60:00 |
| 35 | (Canada) | Alex Auld | — | — | — | — | — | — | — |

Calgary Flames (Win, 31–22–8)
Head coach: Brent Sutter
| | Nat. | Player | Position | G | A | Pts | PIM | +/- | SOG |
| 4 | (Canada) | Jay Bouwmeester (A) | D | 0 | 0 | 0 | 2 | E | 2 |
| 5 | (Canada) | Mark Giordano | D | 0 | 0 | 0 | 0 | +1 | 2 |
| 6 | (Canada) | Cory Sarich | D | 0 | 1 | 1 | 0 | +2 | 0 |
| 8 | (Canada) | Brendan Morrison | C | 0 | 2 | 2 | 0 | +1 | 1 |
| 10 | (Finland) | Niklas Hagman | LW | 0 | 0 | 0 | 0 | E | 1 |
| 11 | (Sweden) | Mikael Backlund | C | 0 | 0 | 0 | 0 | E | 1 |
| 12 | (Canada) | Jarome Iginla (C) | RW | 0 | 1 | 1 | 0 | E | 2 |
| 13 | (Finland) | Olli Jokinen | C | 0 | 1 | 1 | 0 | E | 2 |
| 15 | (United States) | Tim Jackman | RW | 0 | 0 | 0 | 0 | +1 | 2 |
| 16 | (Canada) | Tom Kostopoulos | RW | 0 | 0 | 0 | 0 | E | 3 |
| 17 | (Canada) | Rene Bourque | LW | 2 | 0 | 2 | 0 | +1 | 11 |
| 18 | (Canada) | Matt Stajan | C | 0 | 0 | 0 | 0 | +1 | 0 |
| 20 | (Canada) | Curtis Glencross | LW | 0 | 1 | 1 | 0 | +1 | 2 |
| 25 | (United States) | David Moss | RW | 0 | 0 | 0 | 0 | E | 2 |
| 27 | (Canada) | Steve Staios | D | 0 | 0 | 0 | 0 | E | 0 |
| 28 | (Canada) | Robyn Regehr (A) | D | 0 | 0 | 0 | 0 | E | 0 |
| 33 | (Russia) | Anton Babchuk | D | 1 | 0 | 1 | 0 | +1 | 2 |
| 40 | (Canada) | Alex Tanguay | LW | 1 | 1 | 2 | 0 | E | 4 |

| | Nat. | Goaltender | Result | Rec | GA | SA | SV | SV% | TOI |
|---|---|---|---|---|---|---|---|---|---|
| 34 | (Finland) | Miikka Kiprusoff | W | 26–19–4 | 0 | 39 | 39 | 1.000 | 60:00 |
| 35 | (Sweden) | Henrik Karlsson | — | — | — | — | — | — | — |

Scratches – Did not play

- Montreal Canadiens: Alexandre Picard, Tom Pyatt
- Calgary Flames: Brendan Mikkelson

Officials

- Referees — Brad Meier, Mike Leggo
- Linesmen — Mike Cvik, Mark Wheler

== "Face-off in the Foothills" ==
As part of the weekend festivities, the Flames organized several games during the Family Day long weekend that celebrated both the past and future of the Flames organization and of the city's hockey history. The team branded the events as the "Face-off in the Foothills".

=== Abbotsford Heat vs. Oklahoma City Barons ===
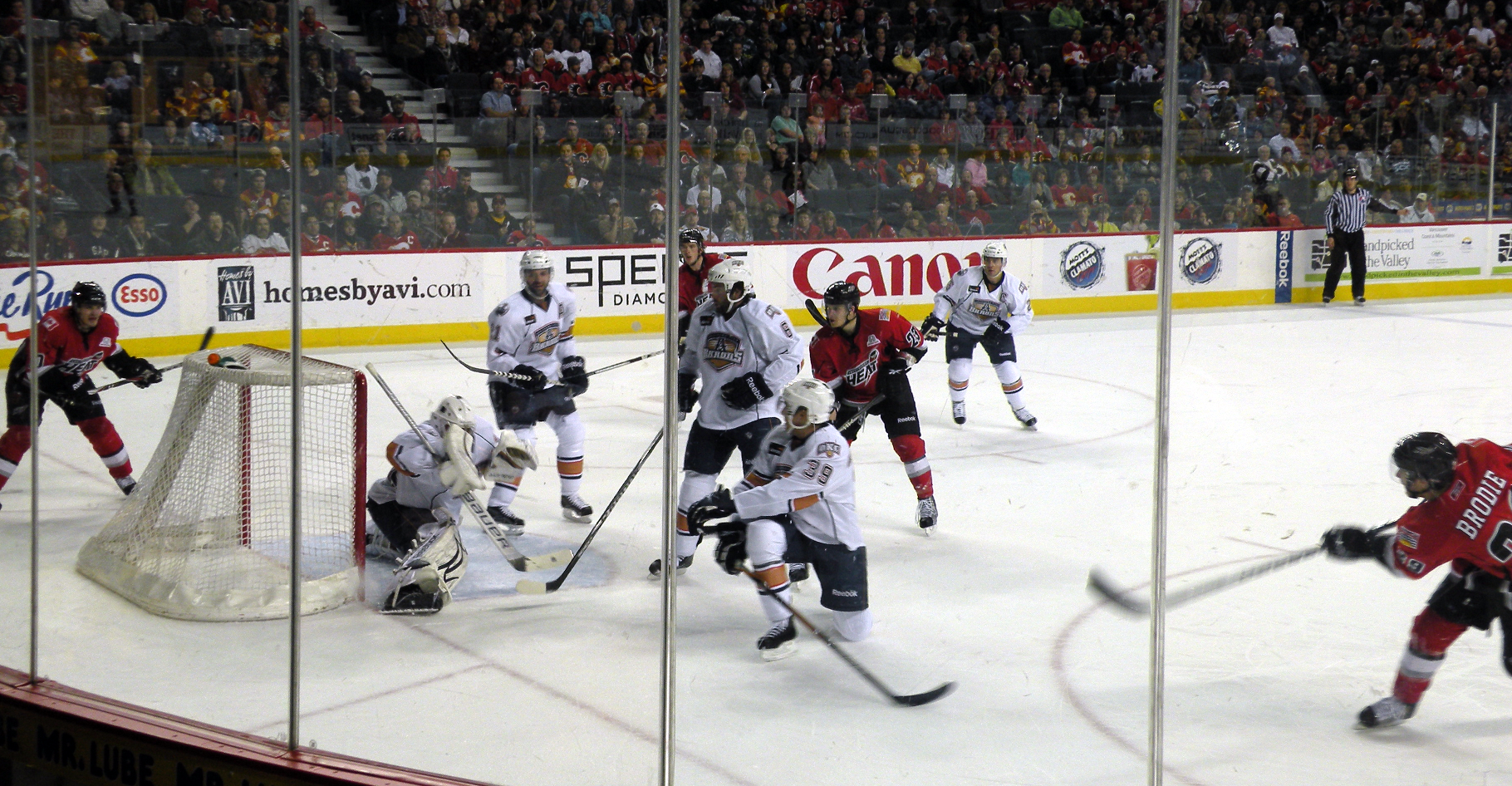
T. J. Brodie takes a shot on Oklahoma City goalie Martin Gerber

The weekend began on Friday, February 18, with an American Hockey League (AHL) game between the Flames' affiliate, the Abbotsford Heat, and the affiliate of the Edmonton Oilers, the Oklahoma City Barons, at the Scotiabank Saddledome. The game, featuring the top prospects for both NHL organizations, drew 8,407 fans to what ended in a 3–1 Barons victory.

The game marked the first return to the Saddledome for Oklahoma City forward Brad Moran. An original member of the Calgary Hitmen in 1995, Moran remains the junior team's all-time leader in numerous categories, including goals, assists and points, and is the only player in Hitmen history to have his jersey retired.

=== Alumni game ===
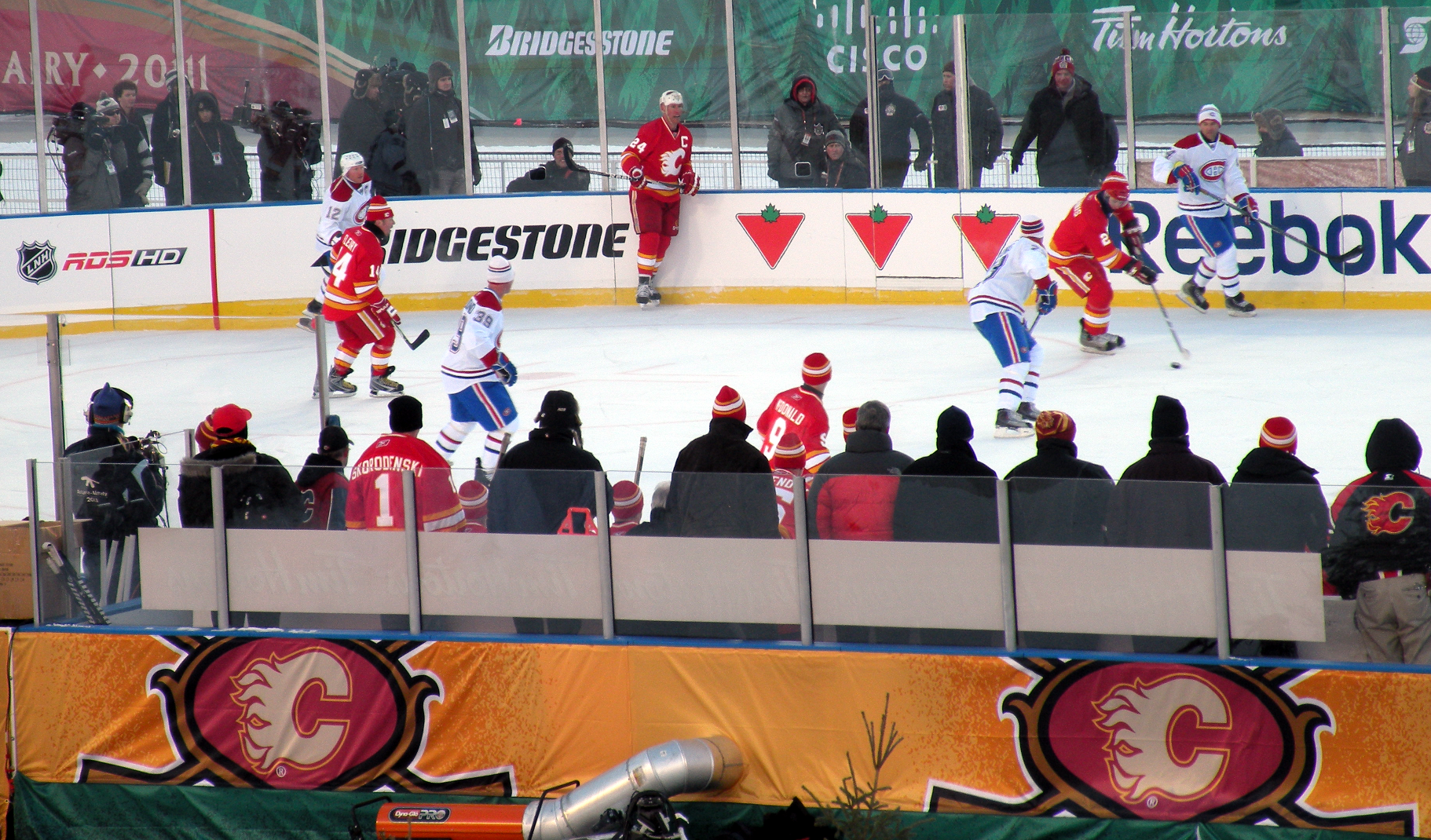
The alumni teams of the Flames and Canadiens battle for the puck.

Led by Jim Peplinski, an alumni game was organized for Saturday, February 19, at McMahon. The game featured 14 members of the Flames' 1989 Stanley Cup championship team, including Lanny McDonald, Al MacInnis, Joel Otto, Theoren Fleury and Joe Nieuwendyk. For Nieuwendyk, at the time the General Manager of the Dallas Stars, the chance to participate in the game was important enough that he chose to overlook the chronic pain in his back when he is on skates. Immensely popular forward Craig Conroy, who retired only a few weeks before the game, also took part for Calgary.

Among the players representing the Canadiens were Mike Keane, Brian Skrudland, Russ Courtnall and Martin Gelinas. The game was played with only two continuous time periods, and was won by the Canadiens, 5–3. Over 10,000 fans turned out for the game on what ended up as the coldest night of the weekend.

=== Calgary Hitmen vs. Regina Pats ===
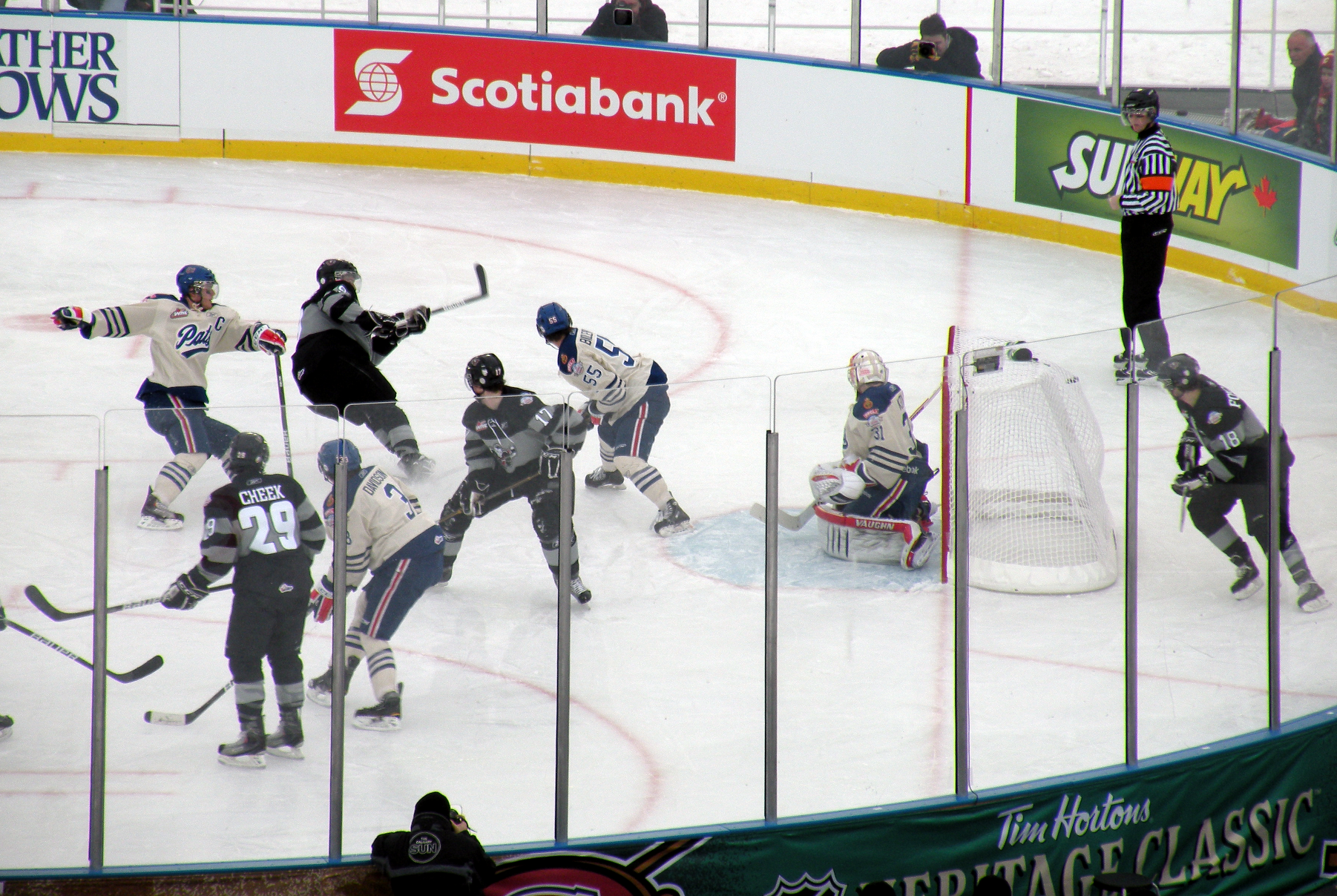
Calgary's Jaynen Rissling scores against the Regina Pats

The weekend ended with a Western Hockey League (WHL) game on February 21 outdoors at McMahon Stadium. The game featured the defending champion Hitmen against the Regina Pats, Canada's oldest major-junior hockey team. The WHL game offered a parallel to the NHL match-up, as the Hitmen are owned by the Flames while the Pats were once an affiliate of the Canadiens. As with the NHL game, the WHL teams wore retro inspired jerseys. The Hitmen wore uniforms similar to those of the city's only Memorial Cup champion, the 1924 Calgary Canadians, while the Pats donned jerseys similar to those they wore in the 1950s. The game was announced as the first outdoor game in WHL history, but the Spokane Chiefs subsequently revealed they would host the Kootenay Ice outdoors on January 15, 2011.

The game was played in much warmer conditions than the Flames-Canadiens game the night previous, as the temperature hovered around the freezing mark. It was a considerably more physical game than the NHL contest, and was won by the Pats, 3–2, on a last-minute goal by Chandler Stephenson. Played before 20,888 fans, the game set new Western and Canadian Hockey League attendance records and set the world record for highest attended junior game.

== See also ==
- 2010–11 Calgary Flames season
- 2010–11 Montreal Canadiens season
- 2011 NHL Winter Classic
- List of outdoor ice hockey games
- List of ice hockey games with highest attendance
