= David Moss (ice hockey) =

American ice hockey player

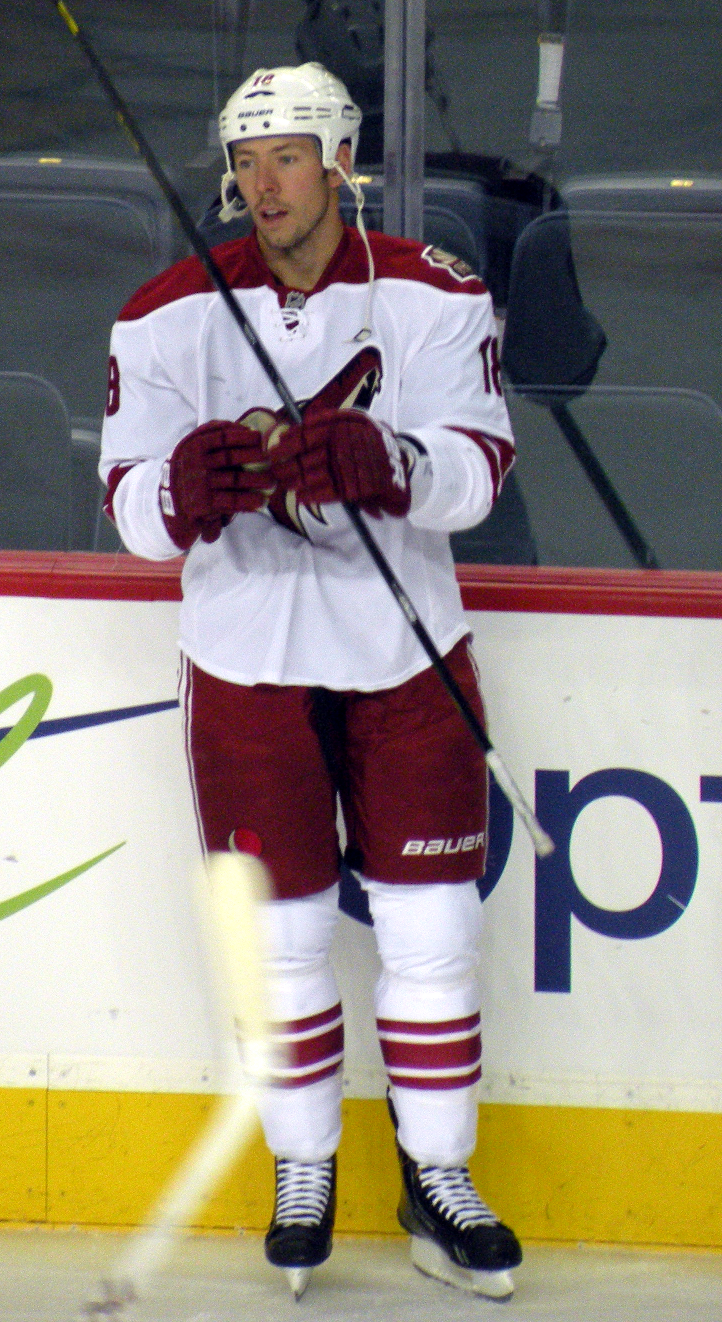
- Moss in 2013
- Born: December 28, 1981 (age 44) Livonia, Michigan, U.S.
- Height: 6 ft 4 in (193 cm)
- Weight: 210 lb (95 kg; 15 st 0 lb)
- Position: Left wing
- Shot: Right
- Played for: Calgary Flames; Arizona Coyotes; EHC Biel
- National team: United States
- NHL draft: 220th overall, 2001; Calgary Flames
- Playing career: 2005–2016
Medal record
Representing the United States
Ice hockey
Ice Hockey World Championships
Bronze medal – third place	2013 Sweden/Finland

David Moss (born December 28, 1981) is an American former professional ice hockey winger who last played for the EHC Biel of the NLA. He was a last round selection of the Calgary Flames, taken 220th overall, at the 2001 NHL entry draft. Moss has appeared in three outdoor games during his career: The 2001 Cold War while he was a member of the University of Michigan Wolverines, while a member of the United States National Team at the 2010 World Championship and at the 2011 Heritage Classic as a member of the Flames. Moss has been honored by his teams for his sportsmanship and dedication to the community on several occasions.

== Playing career ==
=== College ===
Moss played a season of junior hockey with the Cedar Rapids RoughRiders of the United States Hockey League in 2000–01, scoring 20 goals and 38 points in 51 games. The Flames selected him in the seventh round of the 2001 NHL entry draft, 220th overall. He committed first to play for the University of Michigan Wolverines. In his freshman season of 2001–02, Moss played in the Cold War outdoor game before a then-world record crowd of 74,544.

Following his 13-point freshman campaign, Moss scored 32 points in 2002–03 and was named the team's recipient of the Alton D. Simms Trophy as the Wolverine's most improved player. He was a two-time winner of the Howard Colby Award as Michigan's most sportsmanlike player, in 2002 and 2005. In four full seasons with the Wolverines, Moss scored 93 points in 163 games.

=== Professional ===
The Flames assigned Moss to their top minor league affiliate, the Omaha Ak-Sar-Ben Knights of the American Hockey League (AHL), for the 2005–06 season. He led the team's rookies with 21 goals and 48 points. He remained with the Knights to begin the following season, but earned a recall to Calgary on December 19, 2006. Making his NHL debut that night, Moss scored his first goal, the game winning marker, in a 5–3 victory over the Los Angeles Kings. He added goals in his next two games, both against the Vancouver Canucks, to become the first player in Flames history to score in his first three NHL games. Moss finished the season with 18 points in 41 NHL games, and 21 points in 28 games with Omaha.

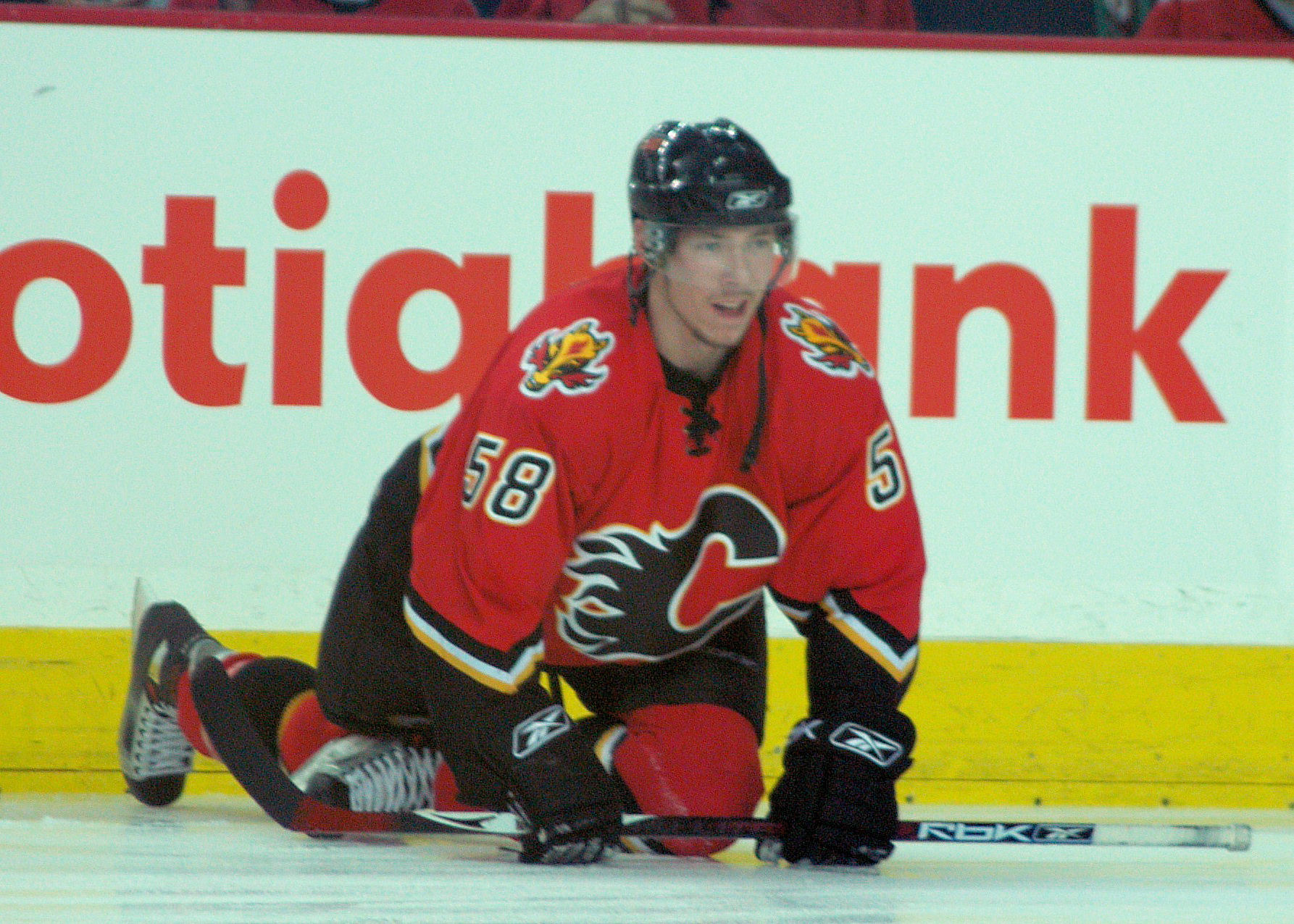
Moss as a member of the Calgary Flames

Moss endured an injury-plagued season in 2007–08. He was unable to play the first two games of the season due to a shoulder injury while also losing time to head injuries and a leg injury that caused him to miss 19 games. He finished the season with only 4 goals in 41 games. Remaining healthy in 2008–09, Moss set career highs with 20 goals and 39 points in 81 games. He also scored his first career hat trick in a 6–3 win over the Ottawa Senators on March 3, 2009.

Another shoulder injury limited Moss early in the 2009–10 season. He scored only 17 points in 64 games for the Flames during the season. However, he made his debut with the United States National Team at the 2010 World Championship following the season. He appeared in six games for Team USA, scoring one goal and two assists, and played in the opening game against the host Germans at Veltins-Arena which set a new world attendance record of 77,803 (subsequently broken).

Despite missing the first month of the season with another shoulder injury, Moss was on pace for a career season in 2010–11 when it was ended by a high-ankle sprain suffered after catching his skate in a rut during practice. Moss appeared in only 58 games, but scored 17 goals and 30 points. The Flames had moved Moss to center from his usual spot on right wing during the season, and he was centring the top line between Jarome Iginla and Alex Tanguay at the time of his latter injury. Prior to the end of his season, Moss played in his third outdoor game, the 2011 Heritage Classic between the Flames and Montreal Canadiens. Moss' injury problems continued into 2011–12 as an ankle injury that ultimately required surgery to repair kept him out of the lineup for 47 games.

On July 1, 2012 Moss signed a two-year contract with the Phoenix Coyotes.

On September 29, 2015 Moss signed a professional tryout contract with the Milwaukee Admirals of the American Hockey League. In November 2015, he inked a deal with EHC Biel of the Swiss NLA for the remainder of the 2015-16 season.

On October 19, 2016 Moss announced he was retiring from professional hockey.

== Personal life ==
Moss, a native of Livonia, Michigan, attended and played high school hockey at Detroit Catholic Central High School. He earned a degree in sports management from the University of Michigan. His cousins Amanda, Blake and Phil Kessel are also hockey players.

Active within the community, Moss donates $100 to the Juvenile Diabetes Research Foundation for each assist scores and is a spokesman for the Reading... Give it a shot! program supporting literacy efforts in Calgary schools. The Flames recognized Moss for his charitable efforts in 2009, naming him that season's recipient of the Ralph T. Scurfield Humanitarian Award, an annual team honor given to the player who "best exemplifies the qualities of perseverance, determination and leadership on the ice, combined with dedication to community service."

Moss married Survivor: Tocantins contestant Erinn Lobdell on July 4, 2014. They currently have four children together.

== Career statistics ==
=== Regular season and playoffs ===
			Regular season					Playoffs
Season	Team	League	GP	G	A	Pts	PIM	GP	G	A	Pts	PIM
1998–99	Detroit Catholic Central High School	HSMI
1999–2000	Detroit Catholic Central High School	HSMI	28	18	20	38	20	—	—	—	—	—
2000–01	St. Louis Sting	NAHL	9	2	2	4	2	—	—	—	—	—
2000–01	Cedar Rapids RoughRiders	USHL	51	20	18	38	14	4	0	1	1	2
2001–02	University of Michigan	CCHA	43	4	9	13	10	—	—	—	—	—
2002–03	University of Michigan	CCHA	43	14	17	31	37	—	—	—	—	—
2003–04	University of Michigan	CCHA	38	8	12	20	18	—	—	—	—	—
2004–05	University of Michigan	CCHA	38	10	20	30	26	—	—	—	—	—
2005–06	Omaha Ak–Sar–Ben Knights	AHL	63	21	27	48	28	—	—	—	—	—
2006–07	Omaha Ak–Sar–Ben Knights	AHL	28	9	12	21	22	—	—	—	—	—
2006–07	Calgary Flames	NHL	41	10	8	18	12	6	0	1	1	0
2007–08	Calgary Flames	NHL	41	4	7	11	10	5	1	1	2	4
2008–09	Calgary Flames	NHL	81	20	19	39	22	6	3	0	3	0
2009–10	Calgary Flames	NHL	64	8	9	17	20	—	—	—	—	—
2010–11	Calgary Flames	NHL	58	17	13	30	18	—	—	—	—	—
2011–12	Calgary Flames	NHL	32	2	7	9	12	—	—	—	—	—
2012–13	Phoenix Coyotes	NHL	45	5	15	20	21	—	—	—	—	—
2013–14	Phoenix Coyotes	NHL	79	8	14	22	18	—	—	—	—	—
2014–15	Arizona Coyotes	NHL	60	4	8	12	24	—	—	—	—	—
2015–16	EHC Biel	NLA	19	6	10	16	10	—	—	—	—	—
NHL totals			501	78	100	178	157	17	4	2	6	4

=== International ===
Year	Team	Event	Result	GP	G	A	Pts	PIM
2010	United States	WC	13th	6	1	2	3	2
2013	United States	WC	3rd place, bronze medalist(s)	10	4	3	7	4
Senior totals				16	5	5	10	6
