= Anton Babchuk =

Ukrainian ice hockey player (born 1984)

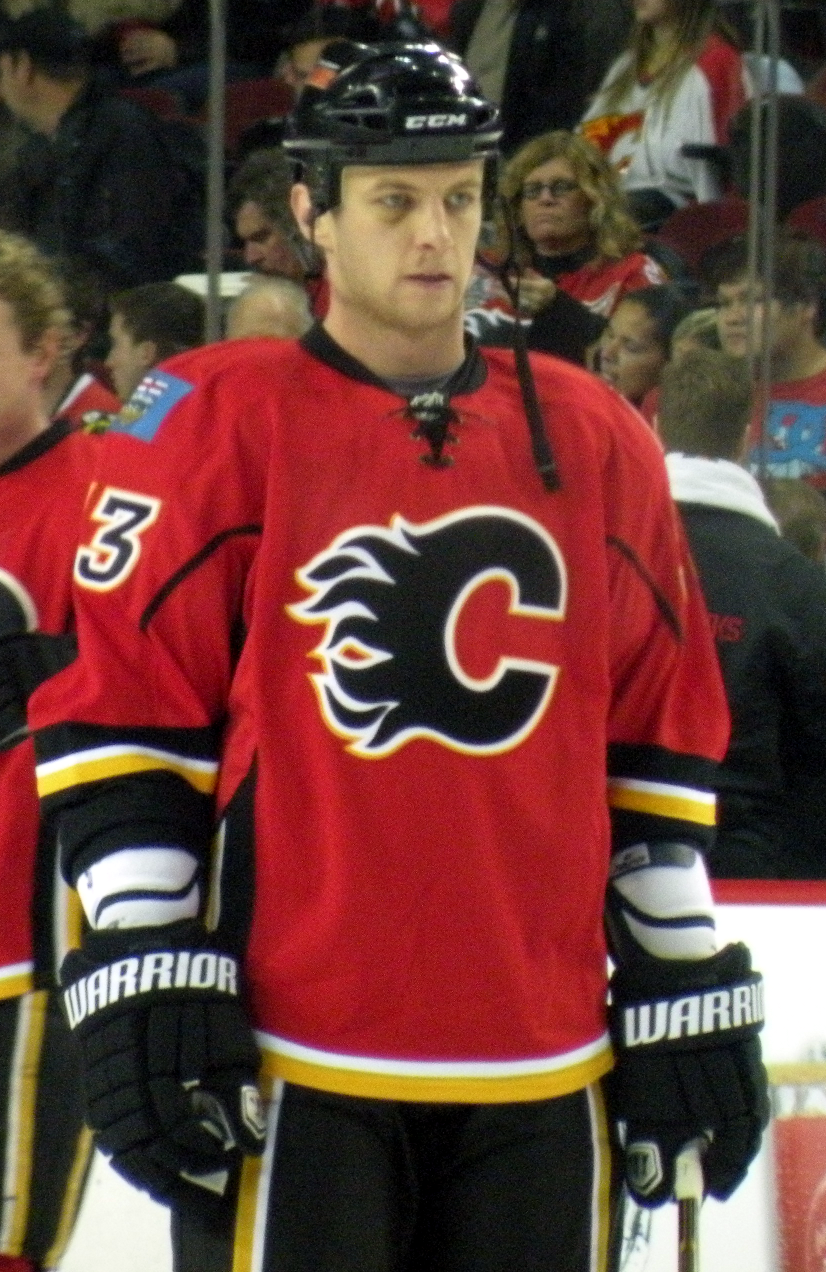
- Babchuk with the Calgary Flames in 2010
- Born: May 6, 1984 (age 42) Kyiv, Ukrainian SSR, Soviet Union
- Height: 6 ft 5 in (196 cm)
- Weight: 212 lb (96 kg; 15 st 2 lb)
- Position: Defence
- Shot: Right
- Played for: Torpedo Nizhny Novgorod; Salavat Yulaev Ufa; Ak Bars Kazan; SKA Saint Petersburg; Chicago Blackhawks; Carolina Hurricanes; Avangard Omsk; Calgary Flames; HC Donbass; Atlant Moscow Oblast
- NHL draft: 21st overall, 2002; Chicago Blackhawks
- Playing career: 2002–2015

Anton Anatoliiovych Babchuk (Ukrainian: Антон Анатолійович Бабчук, Russian: Антон Анатольевич Бабчук; born May 6, 1984) is a Ukrainian-Russian former professional ice hockey defenceman. He last played for Atlant Moscow Oblast of the Kontinental Hockey League (KHL).

Babchuk was a first round selection, 21st overall, of the Chicago Blackhawks at the 2002 NHL entry draft, and played for the Blackhawks, Carolina Hurricanes, and Calgary Flames in his NHL career. He also played with Ak Bars Kazan, SKA Saint Petersburg, Avangard Omsk, HC Donbass, Salavat Yulaev Ufa and Torpedo Nizhny Novgorod of the Kontinental Hockey League (formerly the Russian Super League).

== Playing career ==
Originally from Kyiv, Ukraine, Babchuk began playing hockey at the age of three. He began his training with the Sokil Kyiv junior hockey affiliate, a team which included fellow future Ukrainian NHLer Nikolai Zherdev. He played in the 1998 Quebec International Pee-Wee Hockey Tournament with a youth team from Kyiv. While participating in the tournament, Babchuk's team found itself competing against a team from Elektrostal, Russia. The rival team's coach, Ravil Iskakhov, took note of both Babchuk and Zherdev, and invited the pair to further their development with the Elemash Elektrostal hockey club of the Russian Major League, to which they accepted together.

He was drafted into the National Hockey League (NHL) 21st overall by the Chicago Blackhawks in the 2002 Entry Draft. Babchuk made his North American debut with the Blackhawks affiliate, the Norfolk Admirals of the American Hockey League (AHL), in the 2003–04 season. Babchuk also made his NHL debut by season's end, appearing in five games with the Blackhawks.

In the 2005–06 season, Babchuk was traded to the Carolina Hurricanes for Danny Richmond on January 20, 2006. Babchuk scored his first goal for the Hurricanes on January 28, 2006. He was also named second star of the game. Babchuk played in 22 games with the Hurricanes for the season and was a part of the extended squad of the Hurricanes as they became the Stanley Cup Champions. After winning the Cup, Babchuk took it with him to Kyiv, Ukraine, and celebrated with teammate Oleg Tverdovsky. "I wish hockey was as popular as soccer in Ukraine," he told those in attendance. "If it was, I gladly would have played for a team in Kyiv."

In the 2006–07 season, on February 6, 2007, the Hurricanes activated František Kaberle from injury, forcing them to send Babchuk down to the Albany River Rats. Babchuk was the only possible defenceman they could send down because he was the only one on the Hurricanes' roster that was not subject to waiver wire claims. The next day, Carolina announced that they had suspended Babchuk because of his refusal to report to Albany. In 2007–08, Babchuk played in the Russian Superleague (RSL) for Avangard Omsk.

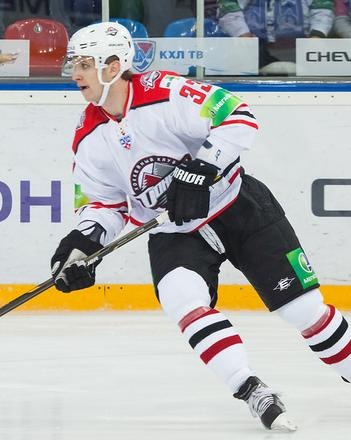
Babchuk playing in the KHL in 2012

On July 1, 2008, Babchuk re-signed with the Hurricanes to a one-year contract for the 2008–09 season. He led all Hurricanes' defensemen with 16 goals in 72 games. Following a contract dispute that lead to him requesting a trade out of Carolina, Babchuk turned back to Russia on 19 September 2009, re-signing with Kontinental Hockey League (KHL) club Avangard Omsk. During the very first training day in Omsk, he broke the ice rink glass with a shot at Arena Omsk.

Babchuk was chosen to play on Team Yashin at the 2nd Kontinental Hockey League All-Star Game.

On July 1, 2010, Babchuk re-signed with the Carolina Hurricanes to a one-year contract worth $1.4 million.

On November 17, 2010, Babchuk was traded along with Tom Kostopoulos to the Calgary Flames for Ian White and Brett Sutter.

On July 4, 2011, Babchuk re-signed with the Flames for two years, at $2.5 million per season. Following the 2012 NHL lockout, he signed in his native Ukraine with HC Donbass along with fellow Ukrainian NHL players Ruslan Fedotenko and Alexei Ponikarovsky.

== Career statistics ==
=== Regular season and playoffs ===
			Regular season					Playoffs
Season	Team	League	GP	G	A	Pts	PIM	GP	G	A	Pts	PIM
1999–2000	Kristall–2 Elektrostal	RUS.3	18	0	1	1	18	—	—	—	—	—
2000–01	Elemash Elektrostal	RUS.2	7	0	0	0	12	—	—	—	—	—
2001–02	Elemash Elektrostal	RUS.2	40	7	8	15	90	—	—	—	—	—
2001–02	Elemash–2 Elektrostal	RUS.3	3	0	0	0	8	—	—	—	—	—
2002–03	Ak Bars Kazan	RSL	10	0	0	0	4	—	—	—	—	—
2002–03	SKA Saint Petersburg	RSL	20	3	0	3	10	—	—	—	—	—
2002–03	SKA–2 St. Petersburg	RUS.3	1	1	0	1	0	—	—	—	—	—
2003–04	Norfolk Admirals	AHL	73	8	14	22	89	8	0	2	2	6
2003–04	Chicago Blackhawks	NHL	5	0	2	2	2	—	—	—	—	—
2004–05	Norfolk Admirals	AHL	66	8	16	24	88	2	0	0	0	2
2005–06	Norfolk Admirals	AHL	24	5	7	12	22	—	—	—	—	—
2005–06	Chicago Blackhawks	NHL	17	2	3	5	16	—	—	—	—	—
2005–06	Carolina Hurricanes	NHL	22	3	2	5	6	—	—	—	—	—
2005–06	Lowell Lock Monsters	AHL	5	1	3	4	0	—	—	—	—	—
2006–07	Carolina Hurricanes	NHL	52	2	12	14	30	—	—	—	—	—
2006–07	Albany River Rats	AHL	9	1	6	7	2	—	—	—	—	—
2007–08	Avangard Omsk	RSL	57	9	15	24	30	4	1	1	2	6
2008–09	Carolina Hurricanes	NHL	72	16	19	35	16	13	0	1	1	10
2009–10	Avangard Omsk	KHL	49	9	13	22	36	2	0	0	0	0
2010–11	Carolina Hurricanes	NHL	17	3	5	8	12	—	—	—	—	—
2010–11	Calgary Flames	NHL	65	8	19	27	20	—	—	—	—	—
2011–12	Calgary Flames	NHL	32	2	8	10	6	—	—	—	—	—
2012–13	HC Donbass	KHL	31	1	2	3	22	—	—	—	—	—
2012–13	Calgary Flames	NHL	7	0	1	1	0	—	—	—	—	—
2013–14	Salavat Yulaev Ufa	KHL	54	3	9	12	24	3	0	0	0	0
2014–15	Torpedo Nizhny Novgorod	KHL	12	0	3	3	12	—	—	—	—	—
2014–15	Atlant Moscow Oblast	KHL	20	6	4	10	12	—	—	—	—	—
AHL totals			177	23	46	69	201	10	0	2	2	8
NHL totals			289	36	71	107	108	13	0	1	1	10
KHL totals			166	19	31	50	106	5	0	0	0	0

=== International ===
Year	Team	Event	Result	GP	G	A	Pts	PIM
2001	Russia	U17	7th	5	0	2	2	10
2001	Russia	WJC18	1st place, gold medalist(s)	6	0	0	0	0
2002	Russia	WJC18	2nd place, silver medalist(s)	8	3	3	6	10
Junior totals				19	3	5	8	20

Awards and achievements
Preceded by Adam Munro	Chicago Blackhawks first-round draft pick 2002	Succeeded by Brent Seabrook
