= Alex Tanguay =

Canadian ice hockey player (born 1979)

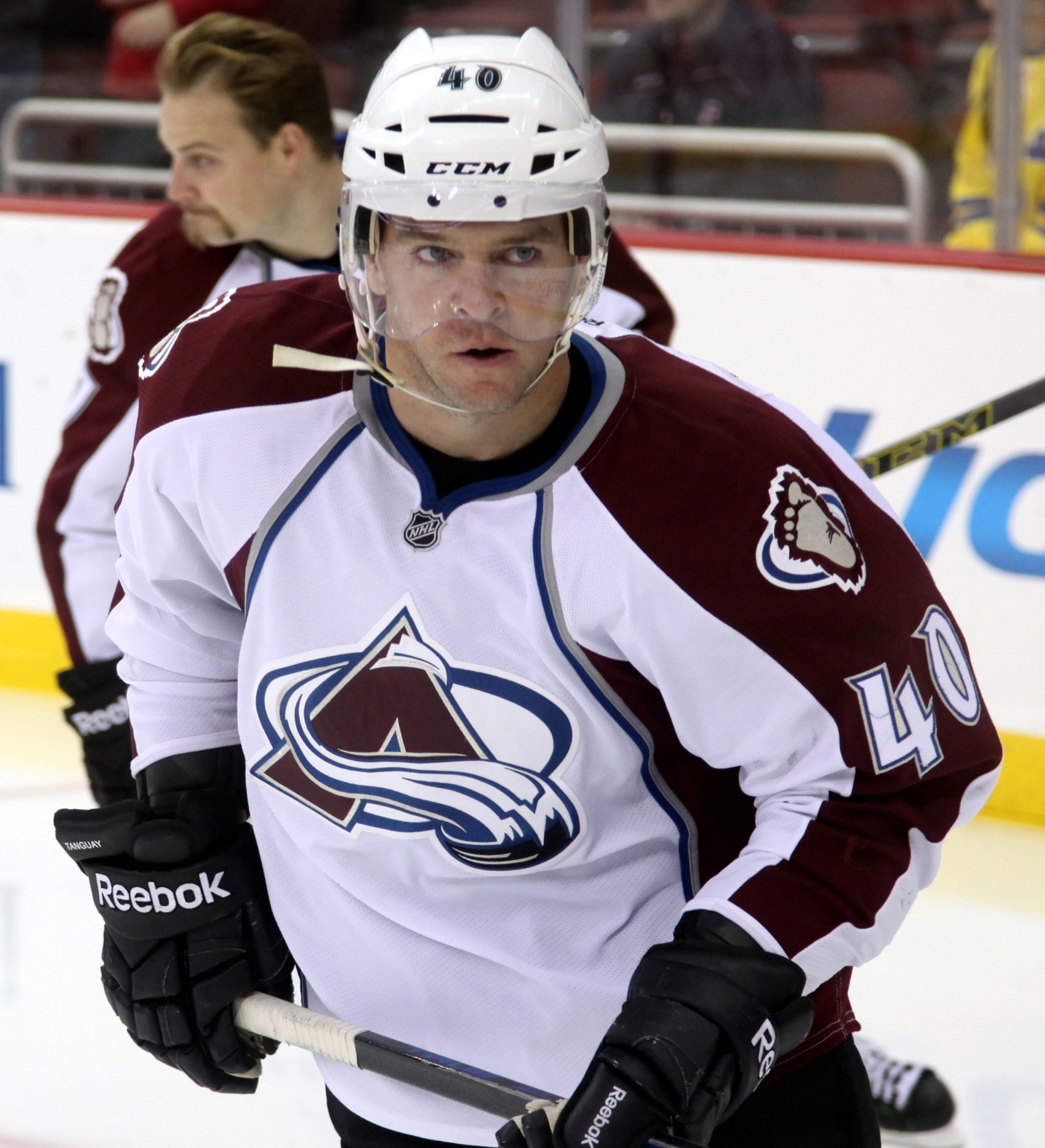
- Tanguay with the Colorado Avalanche in 2014
- Born: November 21, 1979 (age 46) Sainte-Justine, Quebec, Canada
- Height: 6 ft 3 in (191 cm)
- Weight: 220 lb (100 kg; 15 st 10 lb)
- Position: Left wing
- Shot: Left
- Played for: Colorado Avalanche; HC Lugano; Calgary Flames; Montreal Canadiens; Tampa Bay Lightning; Arizona Coyotes
- NHL draft: 12th overall, 1998; Colorado Avalanche
- Playing career: 1999–2016

Alex Joseph Jean Tanguay (born November 21, 1979) is a Canadian former professional ice hockey player who was a winger for the Colorado Avalanche, Calgary Flames, Montreal Canadiens, Tampa Bay Lightning and Arizona Coyotes in the National Hockey League (NHL) and briefly for HC Lugano in the Swiss National League A in 2004. An offensive player, he is best known for his passing and playmaking ability. Tanguay currently serves as an assistant coach for the Detroit Red Wings.

An alumnus of the Halifax Mooseheads of the Quebec Major Junior Hockey League (QMJHL), Tanguay has his jersey retired. During his junior career, he was also a member of Canada's under-20 team at the 1998 World Junior Championships. Selected in the first round, 12th overall, by the Colorado Avalanche at the 1998 NHL entry draft, he began his NHL career with Colorado in 1999. Tanguay won the Stanley Cup with Colorado in 2001, scoring two goals in game seven against the New Jersey Devils.

Individually, he was nominated for the Calder Memorial Trophy following his rookie season and was chosen to the 2004 All-Star Game during his six-year tenure with Colorado. In July 2006, he was traded to the Flames and spent two years with the club before single-season stints with the Montreal Canadiens and Tampa Bay Lightning.

In July 2010, he returned to Calgary, signing as an unrestricted free agent. After three seasons with Calgary, he returned to Colorado for the 2013–14 season. In February 2016, Tanguay was traded from the Avalanche to the Arizona Coyotes, retiring at the season's conclusion.

== Playing career ==
=== Junior ===
As a youth, Tanguay played in the 1992 and 1993 Quebec International Pee-Wee Hockey Tournaments with a minor ice hockey team from Beauce, Quebec. Following a season of midget AAA hockey with the Cap-de-Madeleine Estacades, Tanguay joined the Halifax Mooseheads of the Quebec Major Junior Hockey League (QMJHL) for the 1996–97 season. He played 70 games, scored 27 goals and 68 points and was named to the QMJHL All-Rookie Team. The following season, he improved to 47 goals and 85 points in 51 league games. He was a member of the eighth place Canadian junior team at the 1998 World Junior Hockey Championship, finishing second in team-scoring with three points in seven games.

In a draft in which they had four first-round selections, the Colorado Avalanche made Tanguay their first pick, 12th overall, at the 1998 NHL entry draft. He was invited to Colorado's training camp that fall, and impressed the team such that he made the team as an 18-year-old. Tanguay and the Avalanche, however, were unable to come to terms on a contract and he was instead returned to Halifax for the 1998–99 season.

A few games into his third season with the Mooseheads, he tied a franchise record with five points in one game, an 11–3 victory over the Baie-Comeau Drakkar on October 9, 1998, then tied another record with four goals in a 6–1 defeat of the Drummondville Voltigeurs six nights later. However, he suffered a concussion early in the season which forced him out of the line-up for 28 games. Though he was limited to 31 contests in 1998–99, he scored 27 goals and 61 points. Tanguay finished his junior career as the Mooseheads' all-time leader in goals (101), assists (113) and points (214). In honour of his accomplishments, the team retired his #18 jersey in 2005.

Having replaced his agent following his earlier inability to sign with Colorado, Tanguay agreed to a contract with the Avalanche during the season and was assigned to Colorado's American Hockey League (AHL) affiliate after his junior season ended. He scored one goal and two assists in five regular season games and added two assists in five playoff games.

=== Colorado Avalanche ===
Tanguay made his NHL debut on October 5, 1999, against the Nashville Predators and scored his first point that night, recording an assist on a Claude Lemieux goal as part of a 3–2 Colorado win. He scored at least one point in his first five NHL games, including his first NHL goal on October 8 against Peter Skudra of the Pittsburgh Penguins. He was named to play in the YoungStars Game as part of 2002 NHL All-Star weekend, but did not play due to injury. Though he struggled at times adjusting to play in the NHL, he finished the season second in the league amongst rookies with 51 points, 19 behind rookie-leader Scott Gomez.

In his sophomore season of 2000–01, Tanguay improved to 77 points and finished sixth in the NHL in plus/minus at +35. He enjoyed an 11-game point streak in November 2000, scoring six goals and 13 assists in that span. He was a key contributor for the Avalanche in the post-season, recording 21 points. In game seven of the 2001 Stanley Cup Final, Tanguay scored two goals, including the game-winner, and added an assist in a 3–1 victory against the New Jersey Devils. His efforts led Colorado to its second Stanley Cup championship in franchise history.

After falling to 48 points over 70 games in 2001–02, Tanguay rebounded in 2002–03 to score 67 points. During the season, he had a career best 16-game point streak which set a Colorado team record. He also scored his first career NHL hat trick on March 22, 2003, against the Chicago Blackhawks. He was nearly traded to the Boston Bruins early in the season when both he and the team were struggling. Colorado had offered Tanguay and Martin Škoula to Boston in exchange for Martin Lapointe and Kyle McLaren, though the deal failed to materialize.

He improved to a new personal best of 79 points in 2003–04, good enough for ninth place in league scoring, while his 54 assists tied him for fourth in the NHL. The league named him to the Western Conference team at the 2004 All-Star Game. While the 2004–05 season was cancelled by a labour dispute, Tanguay signed to play for HC Lugano of the Swiss National League A. He appeared in six games with Lugano, scoring six points. He returned to the Avalanche in 2005–06, and despite missing ten games late in the year with a knee injury, set a personal best with 29 goals, while his 78 points was one short of his career high. Tanguay scored two goals in an April 15, 2006, game against the Vancouver Canucks to reach 400 points for his career.

Although he was the team's second leading scorer, Tanguay continued to be the subject of trade talks throughout the season. Set to become a restricted free agent in July 2006, the Avalanche chose to trade his negotiating rights to the Calgary Flames at the 2006 NHL entry draft in exchange for defenceman Jordan Leopold and two second round draft picks. Tanguay felt that the team chose to trade him after he failed to live up to the team's expectations in the playoffs even though he continued to struggle with his knee injury. The Flames quickly signed Tanguay to a three-year contract worth US$15.75 million.

=== Calgary Flames ===
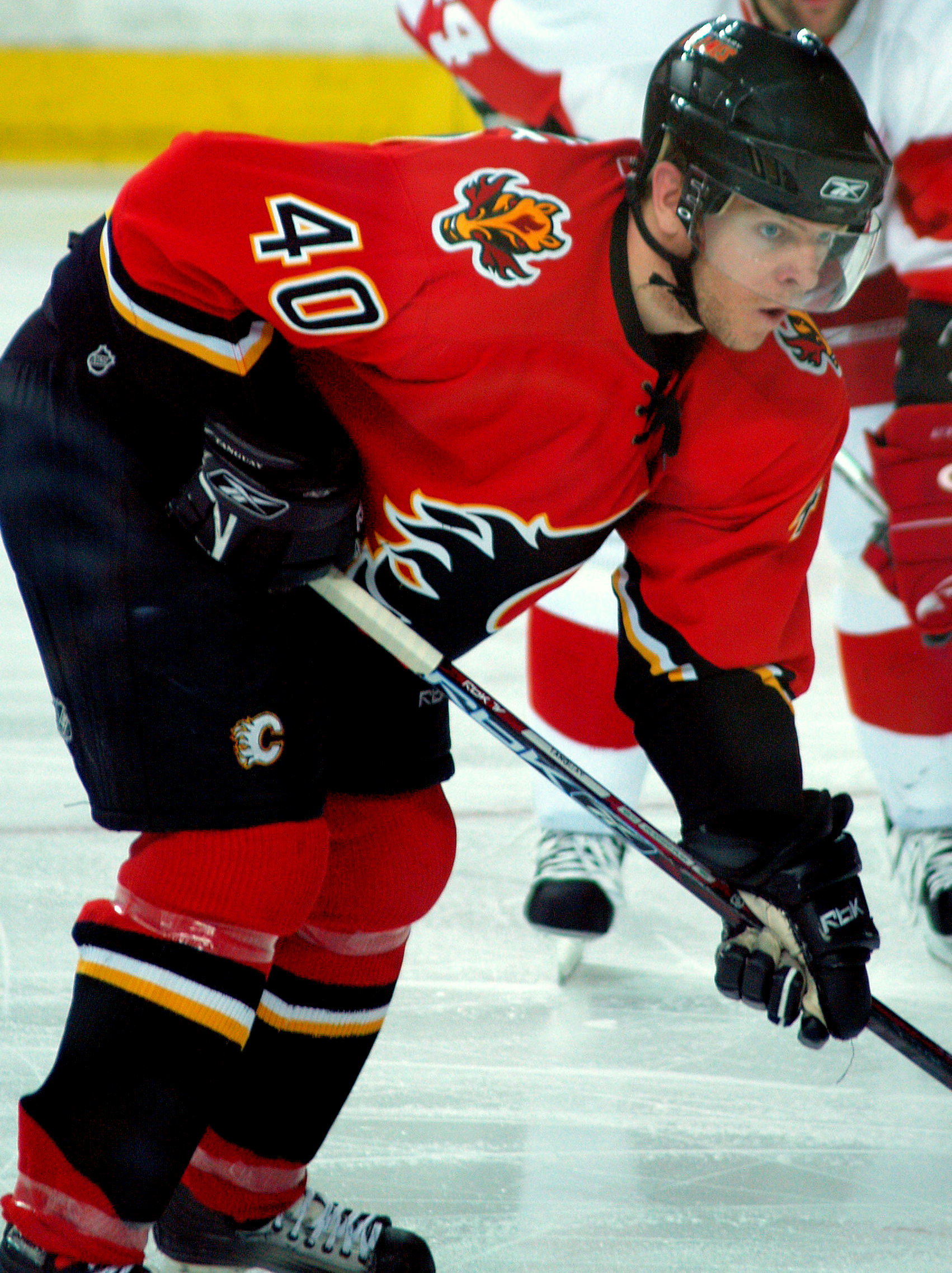
Tanguay in 2007

Tanguay enjoyed a career season in 2006–07, his first in Calgary, scoring a career-high 81 points in 81 games. He was second on the team in scoring, and led the Flames with 57 assists. Additionally, he played in his 500th career game on February 2, 2007, against the Columbus Blue Jackets. The 2007–08 season was a difficult one for Tanguay, as speculation that he would not mesh well with new coach Mike Keenan's style resulted in his being the subject of trade rumours throughout the year.

Pre-season fears of a conflict with Keenan were realized, as the coach reduced his time on the power play and forced him into a defensive role he was not comfortable with. Unhappy with being pushed into a checking role, and believing that the way Keenan was using him was not allowing him to give the Flames fair value on his contract, Tanguay requested a trade at the Christmas break. He and general manager Darryl Sutter agreed to keep it quiet so as not to become a distraction to the team, although Tanguay's request was revealed in the off-season. He suffered offensively, falling to 58 points.

=== Montreal and Tampa Bay ===
Two years after being acquired by Calgary in a draft-day trade, he left the Flames in another such deal. At the 2008 NHL entry draft on June 20, 2008, the Flames granted his request and sent Tanguay to the Montreal Canadiens, along with a fifth round draft pick, in exchange for a first-round pick in 2008 and a second rounder in 2009. Tanguay accepted the trade to Montreal despite previously saying he would never want to play for the Canadiens and expressing worries about being a French-Canadian player in the Montreal spotlight.

Tanguay recovered offensively to begin the 2008–09 season. He was named Montreal's player of the month in October after scoring a team-high six goals and 11 assists. He registered his 500th career point with a goal in a November 20 game against the Edmonton Oilers, and entered December as one of the leading vote getters for the 2009 All-Star Game. He ranked third in team-scoring at the end of the month when he suffered a separated left shoulder as a result of a hit by Evgeny Artyukhin of the Tampa Bay Lightning. He missed two months as a result and appeared in a career-low 50 games.

The Canadiens chose not to re-sign Tanguay following the season. He instead agreed to a one-year, $2.5 million contract with the Tampa Bay Lightning for the 2009–10 season after passing a physical exam on his shoulder. He struggled for most of the season with the Lightning, at one point lamenting that he had "forgotten how to play." It ended as the worst season of his career, as Tanguay finished with 10 goals, 37 points and had a negative plus-minus (−2) for the first time in his career.

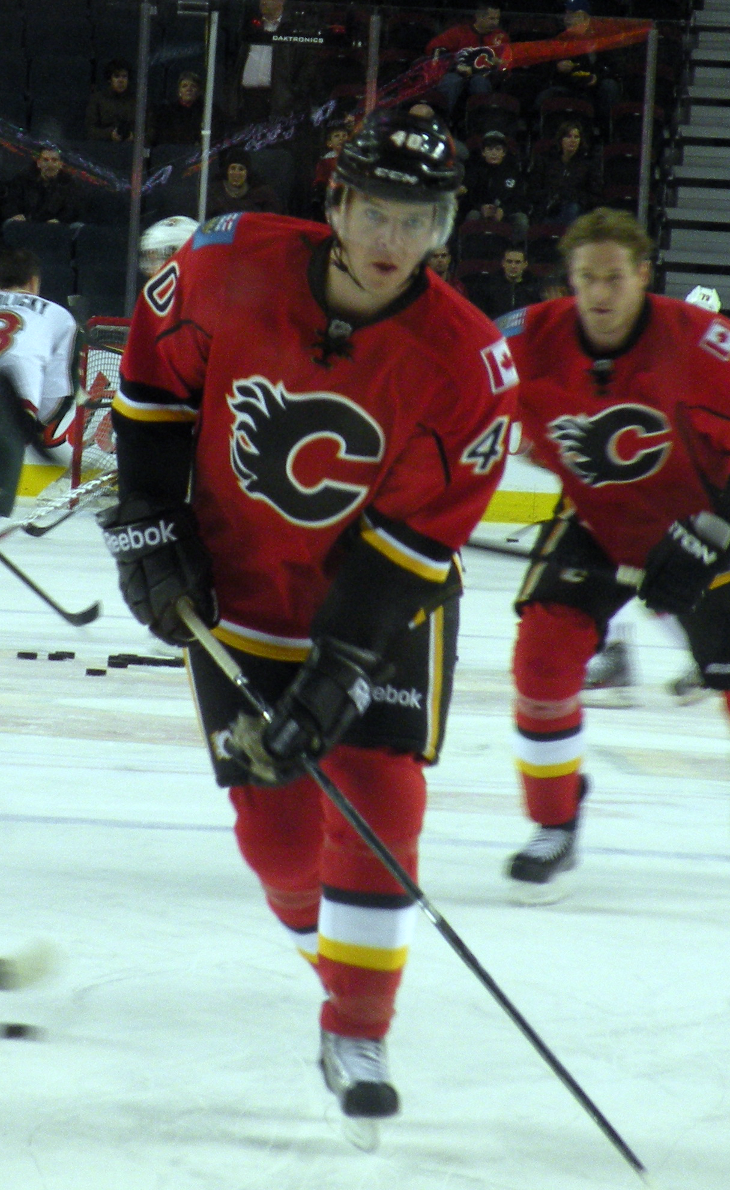
Tanguay prior to a game in 2011

=== Return to Calgary ===
Tanguay opted to return to Calgary, signing a one-year, $1.7 million contract for the 2010–11 season. He said that the Flames, who were now coached by Brent Sutter, were one of his top choices and that he felt he had unfinished business with the team. Tanguay added that the team expressed confidence in his abilities even as others doubted him following his injuries. The decision proved successful, as Tanguay re-established himself as one of his team's top offensive players. He finished second to Jarome Iginla in team scoring with 69 points, and led the Flames with 47 assists. Following the season, the Flames signed him to a five-year contract extension worth $17.5 million.

An upper body injury forced Tanguay out of the Flames' line-up for 15 games in 2011–12. The team never identified the injury, which was speculated to be a concussion. He still finished third in team scoring, with 49 points in 64 games. Tanguay again finished third in team scoring in the lock-out-shortened 2012–13 NHL season, scoring 27 points in 40 games. On February 2, 2013, in a 3–2 shoot-out defeat to the Chicago Blackhawks, Tanguay registered his 500th career assist on a Dennis Wideman goal. His season was again impacted by injury, as he missed the Flames' final games of the campaign after suffering a sprained medial collateral ligament in a game against the Phoenix Coyotes.

=== Return to Colorado ===
With the Flames embracing a rebuild of the team, on June 27, 2013, Tanguay was traded back to his original club, the Colorado Avalanche, along with Cory Sarich in exchange for Shane O'Brien and David Jones. The trade reunited with his former teammate, Patrick Roy, in which Roy was the head coach at the time. In his homecoming game with the Avalanche in their season opener for the 2013–14 season, Tanguay posted 3 assists in a 6–1 victory over the Anaheim Ducks. He was instrumental in Colorado's league best start to the season until he suffered a knee injury after 13 games in a contest against the Montreal Canadiens on November 2, 2013. Tanguay missed the next 36 games before returned to play on January 24, 2014, against the Florida Panthers. Tanguay was limited to just 3 further appearances with the club before he was ruled out for the remainder of the season to undergo hip surgery on February 21, 2014. In his 16 games, Tanguay totalled 11 points and helped the Avalanche to a 15–1 record when in the line-up.

In the final season of his contract with the Avalanche in 2015–16, Tanguay struggled to retain his offensive role in the top six, registering just 4 goals in 52 games. On February 29, 2016 Tanguay was traded to the Arizona Coyotes along with Conner Bleackley and Kyle Wood in exchange for Mikkel Bødker. He made a successful transition and played out the season in contributing with 13 points in 18 games.

As an unrestricted free agent over the following summer, Tanguay proceeded to go un-signed into the 2016–17 season. On February 16, 2017, he officially noted his retirement from professional hockey in accepting a Studio analyst role for the NHL Network.

== Post-playing career ==
On July 23, 2019, Tanguay was named assistant coach for the Iowa Wild of the AHL.

On June 30, 2021, Tanguay was named assistant coach for the Detroit Red Wings, after two seasons with the Wild.

== Playing style ==
Tanguay is best known for his playmaking skills and ability to set his teammates up for scoring opportunities. His speed and passing skills are considered his strongest attributes. Calgary teammates Olli Jokinen and Jarome Iginla both praised his ability to find a way to pass the puck to them in difficult plays.

Tanguay has been criticized for not shooting the puck enough, resulting in the view that his goal totals could be higher. Tanguay has good shooting ability; he led the league in shooting percentage in 2005–06 and finished third in 2006–07 with an average of 23.2% both seasons. He is also a top player in the shootout, and led the league with 10 shootout goals in 2010–11.

== Personal life ==
Tanguay was born on November 21, 1979, in the town of Sainte-Justine, Quebec. His father worked with the family-owned transportation company, while his mother worked at a nearby school division. His younger brother, Maxime, is also a professional hockey player. Tanguay is distantly related to French-Canadian author, and fellow Sainte-Justine native, Roch Carrier.

Tanguay grew up a fan of the Quebec Nordiques and frequently accompanied his grandfather to their games. Owing to the nature of the Battle of Quebec rivalry with the Canadiens that existed when he was growing up, Tanguay admitted unease at joining the Canadiens in 2008.

Tanguay and his wife Helene have three children, Maya, Sam, and Blake. The two volunteer with the Canadian Cancer Society; in the 2010–11 season, he donated $200 for every assist he recorded. With 47 assists, the total reached $9,400; Tanguay established at the beginning of the season, however, that he would donate a minimum of $10,000.

== Career statistics ==
=== Regular season and playoffs ===
			Regular season					Playoffs
Season	Team	League	GP	G	A	Pts	PIM	GP	G	A	Pts	PIM
1994–95	Cap-de-la-Madeleine Estacades	QMAAA	1	0	1	1	0	—	—	—	—	—
1995–96	Cap-de-la-Madeleine Estacades	QMAAA	44	29	34	63	64	5	2	4	6	14
1996–97	Halifax Mooseheads	QMJHL	70	27	41	68	60	12	5	8	13	8
1997–98	Halifax Mooseheads	QMJHL	51	47	38	85	32	5	7	6	13	4
1998–99	Halifax Mooseheads	QMJHL	31	27	34	61	30	5	1	2	3	2
1998–99	Hershey Bears	AHL	5	1	2	3	2	5	0	2	2	0
1999–00	Colorado Avalanche	NHL	76	17	34	51	22	17	2	1	3	2
2000–01	Colorado Avalanche	NHL	82	27	50	77	37	23	6	15	21	8
2001–02	Colorado Avalanche	NHL	70	13	35	48	36	19	5	8	13	0
2002–03	Colorado Avalanche	NHL	82	26	41	67	36	7	1	2	3	4
2003–04	Colorado Avalanche	NHL	69	25	54	79	42	8	2	2	4	2
2004–05	HC Lugano	NLA	6	3	3	6	4	—	—	—	—	—
2005–06	Colorado Avalanche	NHL	71	29	49	78	46	9	2	4	6	12
2006–07	Calgary Flames	NHL	81	22	59	81	44	6	1	3	4	8
2007–08	Calgary Flames	NHL	78	18	40	58	48	7	0	4	4	4
2008–09	Montreal Canadiens	NHL	50	16	25	41	34	2	0	1	1	2
2009–10	Tampa Bay Lightning	NHL	80	10	27	37	32	—	—	—	—	—
2010–11	Calgary Flames	NHL	79	22	47	69	24	—	—	—	—	—
2011–12	Calgary Flames	NHL	64	13	36	49	28	—	—	—	—	—
2012–13	Calgary Flames	NHL	40	11	16	27	22	—	—	—	—	—
2013–14	Colorado Avalanche	NHL	16	4	7	11	4	—	—	—	—	—
2014–15	Colorado Avalanche	NHL	80	22	33	55	40	—	—	—	—	—
2015–16	Colorado Avalanche	NHL	52	4	18	22	24	—	—	—	—	—
2015–16	Arizona Coyotes	NHL	18	4	9	13	8	—	—	—	—	—
NHL totals			1,088	283	580	863	527	98	19	40	59	42

=== International ===
Year	Team	Event	Result	GP	G	A	Pts	PIM
1998	Canada	WJC	8th	7	2	1	3	2
Junior totals				7	2	1	3	2

== Awards and honors ==
Award	Year
NHL
Stanley Cup champion	2001

Awards and achievements
Preceded by Kevin Grimes	Colorado Avalanche first-round draft pick 1998	Succeeded by Martin Škoula
