= 2010–11 Columbus Blue Jackets season =

National Hockey League season

2010–11 Columbus Blue Jackets
- Division: 5th Central
- Conference: 13th Western
- 2010–11 record: 34–35–13
- Home record: 17–19–5
- Road record: 17–16–8
- Goals for: 215
- Goals against: 258

Team information
- General manager: Scott Howson
- Coach: Scott Arniel
- Captain: Rick Nash
- Alternate captains: Ethan Moreau; R. J. Umberger
- Arena: Nationwide Arena
- Average attendance: 13,495 (74.4%)

Team leaders
- Goals: Rick Nash (32)
- Assists: Rick Nash (34)
- Points: Rick Nash (66)
- Penalty minutes: Derek Dorsett (184)
- Plus/minus: Derek MacKenzie (+14)
- Wins: Steve Mason (24)
- Goals against average: Mathieu Garon (2.72)

The 2010–11 Columbus Blue Jackets season was the team's 11th season for the National Hockey League (NHL) franchise that was established on June 25, 1997.

The Blue Jackets posted a regular season record of 34 wins, 35 losses and 13 overtime/shootout losses for 81 points, failing to qualify for the Stanley Cup playoffs for the second consecutive season for the first time since the 2006–07 season and the 2007–08 season.

== Off-season ==
On June 8, 2010, the Blue Jackets announced their new head coach, Scott Arniel, who was previously the head coach of the Manitoba Moose of the American Hockey League (AHL).

On June 17, the Blue Jackets announced their 2010 pre-season schedule. The team will play nine games during the pre-season, including one against a Swedish team, Malmö Redhawks. The game was originally to feature a combined squad featuring players from Malmo and Rögle BK, but these plans fell through as the archrival clubs did not feel that they could compete as a unit.

== Regular season ==
=== Divisional standings ===
Central Division
		GP	W	L	OTL	ROW	GF	GA	Pts
**1**	**y-Detroit Red Wings**	**82**	**47**	**25**	**10**	**43**	**261**	**241**	**104**
**2**	**Nashville Predators**	**82**	**44**	**27**	**11**	**38**	**219**	**194**	**99**
**3**	**Chicago Blackhawks**	**82**	**44**	**29**	**9**	**38**	**258**	**225**	**97**
4	St. Louis Blues	82	38	33	11	34	240	234	87
5	Columbus Blue Jackets	82	34	35	13	29	215	258	81

=== Conference standings ===
Western Conference
R		Div	GP	W	L	OTL	ROW	GF	GA	Pts
**1**	**p – Vancouver Canucks**	**NW**	**82**	**54**	**19**	**9**	**50**	**262**	**185**	117
**2**	**y – San Jose Sharks**	**PA**	**82**	**48**	**25**	**9**	**43**	**248**	**213**	105
**3**	**y – Detroit Red Wings**	**CE**	**82**	**47**	**25**	**10**	**43**	**261**	**241**	104
**4**	**Anaheim Ducks**	**PA**	**82**	**47**	**30**	**5**	**43**	**239**	**235**	99
**5**	**Nashville Predators**	**CE**	**82**	**44**	**27**	**11**	**38**	**219**	**194**	99
**6**	**Phoenix Coyotes**	**PA**	**82**	**43**	**26**	**13**	**38**	**231**	**226**	99
**7**	**Los Angeles Kings**	**PA**	**82**	**46**	**30**	**6**	**36**	**219**	**198**	98
**8**	**Chicago Blackhawks**	**CE**	**82**	**44**	**29**	**9**	**38**	**258**	**225**	97
8.5
9	Dallas Stars	PA	82	42	29	11	37	227	233	95
10	Calgary Flames	NW	82	41	29	12	32	250	237	94
11	St. Louis Blues	CE	82	38	33	11	34	240	234	87
12	Minnesota Wild	NW	82	39	35	8	36	206	233	86
13	Columbus Blue Jackets	CE	82	34	35	13	29	215	258	81
14	Colorado Avalanche	NW	82	30	44	8	24	227	288	68
15	Edmonton Oilers	NW	82	25	45	12	23	193	269	62

bold – qualified for playoffs; y – Won division; p – Won President's Trophy (best record in NHL)
CE – Central Division, NW – Northwest Division, PA – Pacific Division

== Playoffs ==
The Blue Jackets failed to qualify for the playoffs. They last qualified in 2008–09.

== Schedule and results ==
=== Pre-season ===
2010 Pre-season game log: 5–4–0 (home: 2–2–0; road: 3–2–0)
#	Date	Visitor	Score	Home	OT	Decision	Record	Recap
1	September 21	Columbus Blue Jackets	5 - 2	Atlanta Thrashers		Garon	1-0-0
2	September 22	Washington Capitals	6 - 2	Columbus Blue Jackets		Mason	1-1-0
3	September 24	Pittsburgh Penguins	5 - 4	Columbus Blue Jackets		Garon	1-2-0
4	September 25	Columbus Blue Jackets	1 - 3	Pittsburgh Penguins		Mason	1-3-0
5	September 28	Minnesota Wild	2 - 3	Columbus Blue Jackets	SO	LeNeveu	2-3-0
6	September 30	Columbus Blue Jackets	4 - 2	Minnesota Wild		Mason	3-3-0
7	October 1	Columbus Blue Jackets	3 - 5	Washington Capitals		Garon	3-4-0
8	October 2	Atlanta Thrashers	3 - 4	Columbus Blue Jackets		Mason	4-4-0
9	October 5	Columbus Blue Jackets	4 - 1	Malmo Redhawks		Mason	5-4-0

== Schedule and results ==
- Green background indicates win (2 points).
- Red background indicates regulation loss (0 points).
- Silver background indicates overtime/shootout loss (1 point).

2010-11 game log

October: 6–4–0 (home: 3–3–0; road: 3–1–0)
#	Date	Visitor	Score	Home	OT	Decision	Attendance	Record	Pts
1	October 8 (in Stockholm, Sweden)	San Jose Sharks	3 - 2	Columbus Blue Jackets		Mason	11,324	0-1-0	0
2	October 9 (in Stockholm, Sweden)	Columbus Blue Jackets	3 - 2	San Jose Sharks	OT	Mason	9,537	1-1-0	2
3	October 15	Chicago Blackhawks	5 - 2	Columbus Blue Jackets		Mason	18,305	1-2-0	2
4	October 16	Columbus Blue Jackets	3 - 2	Minnesota Wild		Garon	17,336	2-2-0	4
5	October 20	Anaheim Ducks	1 - 3	Columbus Blue Jackets		Mason	9,802	3-2-0	6
6	October 22	Calgary Flames	6 – 2	Columbus Blue Jackets		Mason	10,784	3–3–0	6
7	October 23	Columbus Blue Jackets	3 - 2	Chicago Blackhawks		Mason	21,265	4-3-0	8
8	October 25	Philadelphia Flyers	1 - 2	Columbus Blue Jackets		Garon	11,727	5-3-0	10
9	October 28	Edmonton Oilers	2 - 3	Columbus Blue Jackets	SO	Mason	9,128	6-3-0	12
10	October 30	Columbus Blue Jackets	1 - 5	Colorado Avalanche		Mason	13,017	6-4-0	12

November: 8–4–0 (home: 3–3–0; road: 5–1–0)
#	Date	Visitor	Score	Home	OT	Decision	Attendance	Record	Pts
11	November 2	Montreal Canadiens	0 - 3	Columbus Blue Jackets		Garon	10,466	7-4-0	14
12	November 4	Columbus Blue Jackets	3 - 0	Atlanta Thrashers		Garon	8,461	8-4-0	16
13	November 6	Minnesota Wild	3 - 2	Columbus Blue Jackets		Garon	13,457	8-5-0	16
14	November 10	St. Louis Blues	1 - 8	Columbus Blue Jackets		Mason	10,265	9-5-0	18
15	November 12	Colorado Avalanche	5 - 1	Columbus Blue Jackets		Mason	13,594	9-6-0	18
16	November 17	Columbus Blue Jackets	5 - 3	Los Angeles Kings		Mason	18,118	10-6-0	20
17	November 19	Columbus Blue Jackets	4 - 3	Anaheim Ducks		Mason	13,667	11-6-0	22
18	November 20	Columbus Blue Jackets	3 - 0	San Jose Sharks		Garon	17,562	12-6-0	24
19	November 22	Nashville Predators	0 - 2	Columbus Blue Jackets		Mason	10,095	13-6-0	26
20	November 24	Columbus Blue Jackets	4 - 3	New York Islanders	OT	Garon	8,652	14-6-0	28
21	November 26	Detroit Red Wings	2 - 1	Columbus Blue Jackets		Mason	18,391	14-7-0	28
22	November 28	Columbus Blue Jackets	2 - 4	Detroit Red Wings		Mason	18,860	14-8-0	28

December: 6–7–3 (home: 5–3–1; road: 1–4–2)
#	Date	Visitor	Score	Home	OT	Decision	Attendance	Record	Pts
23	December 1	Nashville Predators	4 - 3	Columbus Blue Jackets	SO	Mason	9,892	14-8-1	29
24	December 3	Columbus Blue Jackets	0 - 5	Buffalo Sabres		Garon	18,529	14-9-1	29
25	December 4	Pittsburgh Penguins	7 - 2	Columbus Blue Jackets		Mason	19,143	14-10-1	29
26	December 6	Dallas Stars	2 - 3	Columbus Blue Jackets	SO	Garon	10,932	15-10-1	31
27	December 9	Columbus Blue Jackets	1 - 4	St. Louis Blues		Garon	19,150	15-11-1	31
28	December 11	New York Rangers	1 - 3	Columbus Blue Jackets		Mason	15,780	16-11-1	33
29	December 13	Columbus Blue Jackets	2 - 3	Calgary Flames	OT	Garon	19,289	16-11-2	34
30	December 15	Columbus Blue Jackets	2 - 3	Vancouver Canucks	OT	Garon	18,860	16-11-3	35
31	December 16	Columbus Blue Jackets	3 - 6	Edmonton Oilers		Mason	16,839	16-12-3	35
32	December 18	Dallas Stars	2 - 1	Columbus Blue Jackets		Garon	13,973	16-13-3	35
33	December 21	Calgary Flames	1 - 3	Columbus Blue Jackets		Garon	12,443	17-13-3	37
34	December 23	Vancouver Canucks	7 - 3	Columbus Blue Jackets		Garon	12,159	17-14-3	37
35	December 26	Columbus Blue Jackets	1 - 4	Chicago Blackhawks		Garon	21,492	17-15-3	37
36	December 27	Minnesota Wild	3 - 4	Columbus Blue Jackets	SO	Mason	14,454	18-15-3	39
37	December 30	Columbus Blue Jackets	3 - 2	Toronto Maple Leafs		Mason	19,148	19-15-3	41
38	December 31	Ottawa Senators	3 - 4	Columbus Blue Jackets	OT	Mason	17,652	20-15-3	43

January: 3–6–2 (home: 1-2–0; road: 2–4–2)
#	Date	Visitor	Score	Home	OT	Decision	Attendance	Record	Pts
39	January 2	Columbus Blue Jackets	1 - 4	Nashville Predators		Mason	14,593	20-16-3	43
40	January 4	Columbus Blue Jackets	2 - 4	Phoenix Coyotes		Garon	8,222	20-17-3	43
41	January 7	Columbus Blue Jackets	0 - 6	Anaheim Ducks		Mason	12,815	20-18-3	43
42	January 8	Columbus Blue Jackets	4 - 6	Los Angeles Kings		Garon	18,118	20-19-3	43
43	January 11	Phoenix Coyotes	4 - 3	Columbus Blue Jackets		Garon	11,109	20-20-3	43
44	January 14	Detroit Red Wings	2 - 3	Columbus Blue Jackets		Mason	18,684	21-20-3	45
45	January 15	Columbus Blue Jackets	5 - 6	Detroit Red Wings	OT	Mason	20,066	21-20-4	46
46	January 18	Columbus Blue Jackets	2 - 3	Tampa Bay Lightning	SO	Garon	13,291	21-20-5	47
47	January 19	Columbus Blue Jackets	3 - 2	Florida Panthers		Mason	11,629	22-20-5	49
48	January 22	Columbus Blue Jackets	5 - 2	St. Louis Blues		Mason	19,150	23-20-5	51
49	January 25	Anaheim Ducks	3 - 2	Columbus Blue Jackets		Mason	11,700	23-21-5	51

February: 8–3–1 (home: 4–2–1; road: 4–1–0)
#	Date	Visitor	Score	Home	OT	Decision	Attendance	Record	Pts
50	February 1	Chicago Blackhawks	7 - 4	Columbus Blue Jackets		Mason	12,568	23-22-5	51
51	February 4	Columbus Blue Jackets	3 - 0	Detroit Red Wings		Mason	20,066	24-22-5	53
52	February 5	Edmonton Oilers	3 - 4	Columbus Blue Jackets		Mason	18,370	25-22-5	55
53	February 8	Columbus Blue Jackets	4 - 1	Pittsburgh Penguins		Mason	18,147	26-22-5	57
54	February 9	San Jose Sharks	3 - 2	Columbus Blue Jackets		Mason	11,906	26-23-5	57
55	February 11	Colorado Avalanche	1 - 3	Columbus Blue Jackets		Garon	16,408	27-23-5	59
56	February 13	Columbus Blue Jackets	2 - 1	Dallas Stars		Mason	16,377	28-23-5	61
57	February 16	Los Angeles Kings	4 - 3	Columbus Blue Jackets	SO	Garon	12,442	28-23-6	62
58	February 18	Columbus Blue Jackets	4 - 3	Chicago Blackhawks		Mason	21,708	29-23-6	64
59	February 22	Nashville Predators	0 - 4	Columbus Blue Jackets		Mason	12,457	30-23-6	66
60	February 25	Phoenix Coyotes	3 - 5	Columbus Blue Jackets		Mason	16,771	31-23-6	68
61	February 27	Columbus Blue Jackets	2 - 3	Nashville Predators		Garon	16,340	31-24-6	68

March: 3–7-6 (home: 1–4–2; road: 2–3–4)
#	Date	Visitor	Score	Home	OT	Decision	Attendance	Record	Pts
62	March 1	Columbus Blue Jackets	1 - 2	Vancouver Canucks	SO	Mason	18,860	31-24-7	69
63	March 3	Columbus Blue Jackets	2 - 4	Edmonton Oilers		Mason	16,839	31-25-7	69
64	March 4	Columbus Blue Jackets	3 - 4	Calgary Flames		Mason	19,289	31-26-7	69
65	March 7	Columbus Blue Jackets	4 - 5	St. Louis Blues	SO	Mason	19,150	31-26-8	70
66	March 9	St. Louis Blues	4 - 3	Columbus Blue Jackets	OT	Garon	11,508	31-26-9	71
67	March 11	Los Angeles Kings	4 - 2	Columbus Blue Jackets		Mason	15,605	31-27-9	71
68	March 12	Columbus Blue Jackets	3 - 2	Carolina Hurricanes		Mason	18,680	32-27-9	73
69	March 15	Boston Bruins	3 - 2	Columbus Blue Jackets	SO	Mason	12,282	32-27-10	74
70	March 17	Detroit Red Wings	2 - 0	Columbus Blue Jackets		Mason	14,444	32-28-10	74
71	March 19	Columbus Blue Jackets	5 - 4	Minnesota Wild	OT	Garon	18,305	32-28-11	76
72	March 20	New Jersey Devils	3 - 0	Columbus Blue Jackets		Mason	13,043	32-29-11	76
73	March 22	Columbus Blue Jackets	4 - 5	Colorado Avalanche	SO	Mason	12,301	32-30-11	77
74	March 24	Columbus Blue Jackets	0 - 3	Phoenix Coyotes		Garon	11,172	33-30-11	77
75	March 27	Vancouver Canucks	4 - 1	Columbus Blue Jackets		Garon	14,469	34-31-11	77
76	March 29	Florida Panthers	2 - 3	Columbus Blue Jackets	SO	Mason	11,670	34-31-11	79
77	March 31	Columbus Blue Jackets	3 - 4	Washington Capitals	OT	Mason	18,398	34-31-12	80

April: 0–4–1 (home: 0–2–1; road: 0–2–0)
#	Date	Visitor	Score	Home	OT	Decision	Attendance	Record	Pts
78	April 1	Chicago Blackhawks	4 - 3	Columbus Blue Jackets	SO	Garon	16,217	34-31-13	81
79	April 3	St. Louis Blues	6 - 1	Columbus Blue Jackets		Garon	13,538	34-32-13	81
80	April 5	Columbus Blue Jackets	0 - 3	Dallas Stars		Garon	16,012	34-33-13	81
81	April 8	Columbus Blue Jackets	1 - 4	Nashville Predators		Mason	17,113	34-34-13	81
82	April 9	Buffalo Sabres	5 - 4	Columbus Blue Jackets		Mason	18,717	34-35-13	81

== Player statistics ==
=== Skaters ===
Note: Pos = Position; GP = Games played; G = Goals; A = Assists; Pts = Points; PIM = Penalty minutes; +/- = Plus/minus; PPG = Power-play goals; SHG = Short-handed goals; GWG = Game-winning goals

Regular season

Player	GP	G	A	Pts	+/−	PIM
Rick Nash	75	32	34	66	+2	34
R. J. Umberger	82	25	32	57	+3	38
Antoine Vermette	82	19	28	47	0	60
Derick Brassard	74	17	30	47	-11	55
Jakub Voracek	80	14	32	46	-3	26
Fedor Tyutin	80	7	20	27	-12	32
Kristian Huselius	39	14	9	23	-17	10
Derek MacKenzie	63	9	14	23	+14	22
Kris Russell	73	5	18	23	-9	37
Samuel Pahlsson	82	7	13	20	-13	30
Jan Hejda	77	5	15	20	-6	28
Matt Calvert	42	11	9	20	+3	12
Grant Clitsome	31	4	15	19	+2	16
Anton Stralman	51	1	17	18	-11	22
Derek Dorsett	76	4	13	17	-15	184
Chris Clark	53	5	10	15	-3	38
Marc Methot	74	0	15	15	+2	58
Jared Boll	73	7	5	12	-2	182
Kyle Wilson	32	4	7	11	-3	12
Rostislav Klesla^{‡}	45	3	7	10	+10	26
Andrew Murray	29	4	4	8	+2	4
Nikita Filatov	23	0	7	7	+3	8
Scottie Upshall^{†}	21	6	1	7	-12	10
Mike Commodore	20	2	4	6	-8	44
Ethan Moreau	37	1	5	6	-9	24
Sami Lepisto^{†}	19	0	5	5	3	18
Tom Sestito^{‡}	9	2	2	4	-4	40
Tomas Kubalik	4	0	2	2	-3	0
Maksim Mayorov	5	1	0	1	0	0
Craig Rivet^{†}	14	1	0	1	-7	23
Mike Blunden	1	0	0	0	-1	0
Nick Holden	5	0	0	0	0	0
John Moore	2	0	0	0	0	0
Nate Guenin^{‡}	3	0	0	0	-3	2

=== Goaltenders ===
Note: GP = Games played; TOI = Time on ice (minutes); W = Wins; L = Losses; OT = Overtime losses; GA = Goals against; GAA= Goals against average; SA= Shots against; SV= Saves; Sv% = Save percentage; SO= Shutouts

Regular season

Player	GP	TOI	W	L	OT	GA	GAA	SA	Sv%	SO	G	A	PIM
Steve Mason	54	3027	24	21	7	153	3.03	1541	.901	3	0	1	2
Mathieu Garon	36	1938	10	14	6	88	2.72	887	.901	3	0	1	2
David LeNeveu	1	20	0	0	0	2	6.00	12	.833	0	0	0	0

^{†}Denotes player spent time with another team before joining Blue Jackets. Stats reflect time with the Blue Jackets only.
^{‡}Traded mid-season
Italics denotes franchise record

== Awards and records ==
=== Awards ===
Regular season
Player	Award	Awarded
Mathieu Garon	NHL Second Star of the Week	November 8, 2010
Rick Nash	NHL First Star of the Week	November 22, 2010
Rick Nash	NHL Third Star of the Week	December 13, 2010
Matt Calvert	NHL Third Star of the Week	February 28, 2011

=== Records ===
Player	Record	Number	Reached
Steve Mason	Most Saves, Period	24	3rd Period; November 19, 2010
R. J. Umberger	Consecutive Games Points Streak	10	December 1, 2010
Rick Nash	Games played for Franchise	544	December 11, 2010
Rick Nash	Career Assist for Franchise	205	December 27, 2010

=== Milestones ===
Regular season
Player	Milestone	Reached
Nikita Filatov	1st NHL Assist	October 8, 2010
R. J. Umberger	100th NHL Goal	October 15, 2010
Chris Clark	200th NHL Point	October 16, 2010
Nick Holden	1st NHL Game	October 20, 2010
R. J. Umberger	400th NHL Game	October 25, 2010
Kyle Wilson	1st NHL Goal	October 25, 2010
Chris Clark	100th NHL Goal	November 10, 2010
Mike Commodore	100th NHL Point	November 19, 2010
Jakub Voracek	100th NHL Point	November 20, 2010
Rick Nash	200th NHL Assist	December 1, 2010
Rostislav Klesla	500th NHL Game	December 15, 2010
Tom Sestito	1st NHL Goal; 1st NHL Point	December 15, 2010
Tom Sestito	1st NHL Assist	December 21, 2010
Jan Hejda	300th NHL Game	December 31, 2010
Matt Calvert	1st NHL Game	January 7, 2011
Jakub Voracek	200th NHL Game	January 7, 2011
Matt Calvert	1st NHL Goal; 1st NHL Point	January 8, 2011
Antoine Vermette	500th NHL Game	January 8, 2011
Matt Calvert	1st NHL Assist	January 22, 2011
Marc Methot	200th NHL Game	February 1, 2011
John Moore	1st NHL Game	February 5, 2011
Derick Brassard	100th NHL Point	February 8, 2011
Anton Stralman	200th NHL Game	February 8, 2011
Derek MacKenzie	100th NHL Game	February 11, 2011
Chris Clark	600th NHL Game	February 18, 2011
Matt Calvert	1st NHL Hat-trick	February 25, 2011
Samuel Pahlsson	700th NHL Game	March 4, 2011
Ethan Moreau	900th NHL Game	March 22, 2011
Tomas Kubalik	1st NHL Game; 1st NHL Assist; 1st NHL Point	March 31, 2011
Maksim Mayorov	1st NHL Goal; 1st NHL Point	April 1, 2011
Derick Brassard	200th NHL Game	April 8, 2011

== Transactions ==
The Blue Jackets have been involved in the following transactions during the 2010–11 season.

=== Trades ===
Date	Details
November 11, 2010	To New York Rangers Chad Kolarik	To Columbus Blue Jackets Dane Byers
January 4, 2011	To Anaheim Ducks Nate Guenin	To Columbus Blue Jackets Trevor Smith
February 28, 2011	To Phoenix Coyotes Rostislav Klesla; Dane Byers	To Columbus Blue Jackets Scottie Upshall; Sami Lepisto
February 28, 2011	To Philadelphia Flyers Tom Sestito	To Columbus Blue Jackets Greg Moore; Michael Chaput
March 1, 2011	To Minnesota Wild Future considerations	To Columbus Blue Jackets Petr Kalus

=== Free agents acquired ===
Player	Former team	Contract terms
Gustaf Wesslau	Djurgardens IF	1 year, $790,000
Kyle Wilson	Washington Capitals	1 year, $600,000
Nate Guenin	Pittsburgh Penguins	1 year, $575,000
David LeNeveu	Red Bull Salzburg	1 year, $550,000
Ben Guite	Nashville Predators	1 year, $575,000
Oliver Gabriel	Portland Winterhawks	3 years, $1.87 million entry-level contract

=== Free agents lost ===
Player	New team	Contract terms
Nathan Paetsch	Florida Panthers	1 year, $525,000
Greg Moore	Philadelphia Flyers	1 year, $550,000
Mathieu Roy	Tampa Bay Lightning	1 year, $600,000

=== Claimed via waivers ===
Player	Former team	Date claimed off waivers
Ethan Moreau	Edmonton Oilers	June 30, 2010
Craig Rivet	Buffalo Sabres	February 26, 2011

=== Lost via waivers ===
Player	New team	Date claimed off waivers

=== Lost via retirement ===
Player

=== Player signings ===
Player	Contract terms
Theo Ruth	3 years, $2.2875 million entry-level contract
Cody Goloubef	3 years, $2.35 million entry-level contract
Steven Delisle	3 years, $1.75 million entry-level contract
Tomas Kubalik	3 years, $1.84 million entry-level contract
David Savard	3 years, $2.2205 million entry-level contract
Tomas Kana	1 year, $625,000
Derek MacKenzie	2 years, $1.2 million
Trevor Frischmon	1 year, $575,000
Jared Boll	2 years, $1.45 million
Tom Sestito	1 year, $577,500
Chad Kolarik	1 year, $550,000
Grant Clitsome	1 year, $550,000
Anton Stralman	1 year, $1.95 million
Mike Blunden	1 year, $590,000
Ryan Johansen	3 years, $2.7 million entry-level contract
Steve Mason	2 years, $5.8 million contract extension
Anton Blomqvist	3 years, $1.71 million entry-level contract
Cam Atkinson	2 years, $1.55 million entry-level contract
Allen York	2 years, 1.425 million entry-level contract

== Draft picks ==
Columbus had eight picks at the 2010 NHL entry draft in Los Angeles, California.

Round	#	Player	Position	Nationality	College/Junior/Club team (League)
1	4	Ryan Johansen	C	Canada	Portland Winterhawks (WHL)
2	34	Dalton Smith	LW	Canada	Ottawa 67's (OHL)
2	55 (from Vancouver via Buffalo)	Petr Straka	RW	Czech Republic	Rimouski Océanic (QMJHL)
4	94	Brandon Archibald	D	United States	Sault Ste. Marie Greyhounds (OHL)
4	102 (from Anaheim)	Mathieu Corbeil-Theriault	G	Canada	Halifax Mooseheads (QMJHL)
5	124	Austin Madaisky	D	Canada	Kamloops Blazers (WHL)
6	154	Dalton Prout	D	Canada	Barrie Colts (OHL)
7	184	Martin Ouellette	G	Canada	Kimball Union Academy (USHS-NH)

== See also ==
- 2010–11 NHL season

== Farm teams ==
The American Hockey League's Springfield Falcons and the Central Hockey League's Fort Wayne Komets are the Blue Jackets' minor league affiliates for the 2010–11 season.
