= 2010–11 Anaheim Ducks season =

National Hockey League team season

2010–11 Anaheim Ducks
- Division: 2nd Pacific
- Conference: 4th Western
- 2010–11 record: 47–30–5
- Home record: 26–13–2
- Road record: 21–17–3
- Goals for: 239
- Goals against: 235

Team information
- General manager: Bob Murray
- Coach: Randy Carlyle
- Captain: Ryan Getzlaf
- Alternate captains: Saku Koivu; Teemu Selanne
- Arena: Honda Center
- Average attendance: 14,739 (85.8%); Total: 604,283

Team leaders
- Goals: Corey Perry (50)
- Assists: Ryan Getzlaf (57)
- Points: Corey Perry (98)
- Penalty minutes: George Parros (171)
- Plus/minus: Toni Lydman (+32)
- Wins: Jonas Hiller (26)
- Goals against average: Ray Emery (2.28)

The 2010–11 Anaheim Ducks season was the 18th season of operation for the National Hockey League (NHL) franchise. After a disappointing previous season, the Ducks attempted to win the Stanley Cup for the second time in franchise history. They were ultimately defeated by the Nashville Predators in the first round of the playoffs.

== Off-season ==
The Anaheim Ducks entered the off-season with much speculation regarding the possible retirement of two mainstays in Anaheim: Scott Niedermayer and Teemu Selanne. On Tuesday, June 22, 2010, captain Scott Niedermayer announced his retirement from professional hockey, while it was reported Selanne would stay so long as the Ducks did not go into a "rebuilding" season.

On July 1, the Ducks re-signed center Saku Koivu to a two-year contract and signed defenseman Toni Lydman to a three-year contract. The Ducks later signed Andy Sutton to a two-year contract, and on August 9, signed Teemu Selanne to a one-year contract to continue his playing career. During training camp, the Ducks signed defenseman Paul Mara to a one-year contract, and after a few games into the season, the Ducks signed another defenseman, veteran Andreas Lilja, to a one-year contract.

Forward Ryan Getzlaf was named team captain following Scott Niedermayer's retirement.

== Regular season ==
See the game log below for detailed game-by-game regular season information.

The season for the Ducks began Friday, October 8 with a road game against Detroit. Their first home game was Wednesday, October 13 against Vancouver. Their longest homestand was from February 23 to March 9 (seven home games), and their longest road trip was December 15 to 28 (seven road games). Their final game of the regular season was on Saturday, April 9 against Los Angeles.

=== October ===
After much talk about having a good start, the Ducks had one of their worst starts in franchise history losing their first three games and going 4–7–1 in the month of October. Their first three games were on the road in Detroit, Nashville, and St. Louis, they were outscored 13–2 and were shut out by Detroit in the first game of the season. Returning home, the Ducks rebounded a little bit after the horrendous first three games by beating the eventual President's Trophy winner Vancouver Canucks 4–3. They proceeded to lose the next game in a shootout to the Minnesota Wild and beat division rival Phoenix to close out the three game home stand. The Ducks then went 1–1 in the first two games of a four-game road trip and were able to seize a playoff spot despite the 0–3 start to the season. However, they lost the next game to Detroit 5–4 to knock them out of the top eight and even though they won the final game of the road trip, they didn't return to the top eight until November 9. On the road trip, the Ducks went 2–2. When the Ducks returned to Honda Center on the 29th, they faced the team that beat them in the Stanley Cup Finals in 2003: the New Jersey Devils. The Devils edged the Ducks 2–1 and to round out what was a disappointing month, Anaheim lost to arch-rival San Jose on the 30th.

=== November ===
The beginning of the month of November couldn't have been any more different from the beginning of the month of October for the Ducks. They went 6–0 in their first 6 games with five of those six games being played in Anaheim at Honda Center. Five of those six games were one goal games with two going to overtime. On November 9, the Ducks took hold of a playoff berth with an overtime win over arch-rival San Jose at HP Pavilion and rounded out the six-game winning streak with a 4–2 victory over division rival Dallas at Honda Center. While the month started out very well for Anaheim, inconsistency struck the Ducks and they lost six games in a row, only collecting two points from November 14 through November 26 thanks to two overtime losses at Chicago and at Minnesota. This slide cost the Ducks a playoff spot for the time being. Anaheim finished off the month with a win over Phoenix at Jobing.com Arena and a win over cross-town rival Los Angeles in front of a sold-out crowd at Honda Center. While the Ducks' 8–4–2 record was markedly better than their record in the month of October, inconsistency still plagued the team.

=== December ===
December proved to be an incredibly challenging month for Anaheim thanks to the longest road trip of the season (7 games). They started out by beating the Florida Panthers, but promptly losing the next two games to Detroit and Phoenix on December 3 and December 5 respectively. After those three games, the Ducks only had two games at Honda Center from December 7 through December 28 and they started this stretch of time well by beating the Edmonton Oilers in a shootout at Rexall Place and taking a point from the Vancouver Canucks by virtue of a shootout loss at Rogers Arena. With the victory over the Oilers, the Ducks moved above the .500 mark and did not fall below that mark for the rest of the 2010–11 season. The Ducks returned home to beat the Calgary Flames 3–2 in a shootout and after three straight games being decided in the shootout, the Ducks beat the Minnesota Wild decisively 6–2. After the game against the Wild on the 12th, the Anaheim Ducks did not return to the friendly confines of Honda Center until December 31. Anaheim started out the road trip well by beating the reeling Washington Capitals (the Washington loss marked their seventh in a row of an eventual eight game skid), however, in front of the smallest crowd of the season (7,659) the Ducks fell to the lowly New York Islanders at the Nassau Coliseum. The Ducks then lost two of the next three games, beating only the Boston Bruins before heading into the short Christmas break. Back home in Southern California, the Ducks dropped the first game after Christmas to cross-town rival Los Angeles at Staples Center, but they did win the final two games of the month at Phoenix and finally back home at Honda Center over the Philadelphia Flyers. The game on December 31 against the Flyers, was originally intended to be Chris Pronger's first game at Honda Center since his trade, however, due to injuries, he was unable to play. Despite an 8–6–1 record, the Ducks were in a playoff position for most of the month of December partially thanks to the fact that they had played more games than any other Western Conference team. They were also the first in the Western Conference to reach the 41 game mark (halfway point in the season) and they got there with 44 points. This marked the team's third best first half since the lockout only behind their 62-point showing in 2006–07 and their 47 points in 2008–09.

=== January ===
The Ducks went on a roll in the month of January winning 8 of 11 games. Throughout the month, however, all of Anaheim's wins were very close games with the Ducks winning by only one goal with the exception of the 6–0 victory over Columbus on January 7. Anaheim was on a long homestand during the first half of the month and started with a 1–1 record in the new year by defeating the defending champion Blackhawks and falling to the Nashville Predators in front of the smallest home crowd of the season (a mere 12,216). After that loss, they took advantage of home ice by taking down the Blue Jackets, rival Sharks, and Blues. Anaheim then fell to the Phoenix Coyotes in a short one game road trip to the desert but then came home to defeat the Edmonton Oilers on January 16 in their final home game until after the All-Star Game. Heading out on the road, the Ducks were to face the Ottawa Senators, Toronto Maple Leafs, Montreal Canadiens, and Columbus Blue Jackets. Overall, Anaheim had a very good road trip only falling to Toronto. The game against the Leafs was significant because it was the first time former Ducks netminder (and Ducks starter in the 2003 and 2007 finals) J.S. Giguere faced his old team. Giguere got the best of Anaheim by posting a 5–2 victory. The game at Montreal was also significant because it was Ducks centerman Saku Koivu's first time playing at the Bell Centre since he signed with Anaheim prior to the 2009–10 season. The Canadien faithful gave Koivu an incredibly warm welcome, but in the end, the patrons at the Bell Centre were not pleased with the final result as Anaheim skated away with a 4–3 shootout victory. Going into the All-Star Game, the Ducks had 60 points, enough to be in the top 8 and were honored to send 3 players to the festivities in Raleigh, North Carolina. Ducks winger Corey Perry was selected alongside goaltender Jonas Hiller (the only goaltender from the Western Conference) to participate in the game. Rookie defenseman Cam Fowler also attended, but he (along with many other rookies) were only there to compete in the skills tournament.

== Playoffs ==
The Ducks clinched a playoff spot on Friday, April 8 after a 2–1 defeat of the Los Angeles Kings in a Freeway Face-Off matchup. 2011 marked the first year the Kings and Ducks have been in the playoffs simultaneously.

The Ducks were eliminated in the first round of the playoffs by fifth-seeded Nashville, losing the series four games to two.

== Schedule and results ==
=== Preseason ===
2010 Preseason Game Log
Rookie Tournament 1–2–0

#	Date	Opponent	Score	OT	Win	Loss	Attendance	Record	Arena	Box
1	September 12	Sharks	4–1		Anderson (1–0–0)	Pielmeier (0–1–0)	3,500	0–1–0	South Okanagan Events Centre	L1
2	September 13	Flames	8–4		Keetley (1–0–0)	Cousineau (0–1–0)	2,500	0–2–0	South Okanagan Events Centre	L2
3	September 15	@ Canucks	4–2		Pielmeier (1–1–0)	Houser (0–2–0)	3,000	1–2–0	South Okanagan Events Centre	W1

September: 2–3–0 (home: 1–1–0; road: 1–2–0)

#	Date	Opponent	Score	OT	Win	Loss	Attendance	Record	Arena	Box
1	September 21	Coyotes	4–1		LaBarbera (1–0–0)	McElhinney (0–1–0)	12,382	0–1–0	Honda Center	L1
2	September 22	Sharks	5–2		Hiller (1–0–0)	Niittymaki (0–1–0)	12,633	1–1–0	Honda Center	W1
3	September 24	@ Sharks	5–4		Pielmeier (1–0–0)	Sateri (0–1–0)	15,872	2–1–0	HP Pavilion at San Jose	W2
4	September 25	@ Canucks	4–1		Luongo (1–0–0)	Hiller (1–1–0)	18,860	2–2–0	Rogers Arena	L1
5	September 28	@ Kings	8–3		Quick (1–1–0)	McElhinney (0–2–0)	12,520	2–3–0	Staples Center	L2

October: 1–1–0 (home: 1–1–0; road: 0–0–0)

#	Date	Opponent	Score	OT	Win	Loss	Attendance	Record	Arena	Box
6	October 1	Canucks	4–2		Schneider (2–3–0)	Hiller (1–2–0)	14,235	2–4–0	Honda Center	L3
7	October 3	Kings	3–2	OT	Hiller (1–2–1)	Bernier (1–0–1)	16,329	3–4–0	Honda Center	W1

Legend
Ducks Win	Ducks Loss	OT Loss

=== Regular season ===
2010–11 Game Log
October: 4–7–1 (home: 2–1–1; road: 2–6–0)

#	Date	Opponent	Score	OT	Win	Loss	Attendance	Record	Arena	Box	Points
1	October 8	@ Red Wings	4–0		Howard (1–0–0)	Hiller (0–1–0)	20,066	0–1–0	Joe Louis Arena	L1	0
2	October 9	@ Predators	4–1		Rinne (1–0–0)	Hiller (0–2–0)	17,113	0–2–0	Bridgestone Arena	L1	0
3	October 11	@ Blues	5–1		Halak (2–0–0)	Hiller (0–3–0)	19,150	0–3–0	Scottrade Center	L3	0
4	October 13	Canucks	4–3		Hiller (1–3–0)	Luongo (1–1–1)	17,174	1–3–0	Honda Center	W1	2
5	October 15	Thrashers	5–4	SO	Mason (2–2–0)	Hiller (1–3–1)	13,123	1–3–1	Honda Center	O1	3
6	October 17	Coyotes	3–2		Hiller (2–3–1)	LaBarbera (0–1–0)	13,574	2–3–1	Honda Center	W1	5
7	October 20	@ Blue Jackets	3–1		Mason (2–2–0)	Hiller (2–4–1)	9,802	2–4–1	Nationwide Arena	L1	5
8	October 21	@ Flyers	3–2		McElhinney (1–0–0)	Bobrovsky (2–2–0)	19,012	3–4–1	Wells Fargo Center	W1	7
9	October 23	@ Red Wings	5–4		Howard (4–0–1)	McElhinney (1–1–0)	19,401	3–5–1	Joe Louis Arena	L1	7
10	October 26	@ Stars	5–2		Hiller (3–4–1)	Lehtonen (5–3–0)	12,378	4–5–1	American Airlines Center	W1	9
11	October 29	Devils	2–1		Brodeur (3–6–1)	Hiller (3–5–1)	14,724	4–6–1	Honda Center	L1	9
12	October 30	@ Sharks	5–2		Niittymaki (4–0–1)	McElhinney (1–2–0)	17,562	4–7–1	HP Pavilion at San Jose	L2	9

November: 8–4–2 (home: 6–3–0; road: 2–1–2)

#	Date	Opponent	Score	OT	Win	Loss	Attendance	Record	Arena	Box	Points
13	November 3	Lightning	3–2	OT	Hiller (4–5–1)	Ellis (3–2–2)	13,034	5–7–1	Honda Center	W1	11
14	November 5	Penguins	3–2		Hiller (5–5–1)	Fleury (1–6–0)	17,174	6–7–1	Honda Center	W2	13
15	November 7	Predators	5–4		Hiller (6–5–1)	Lindback (3–1–1)	13,520	7–7–1	Honda Center	W3	15
16	November 9	@ Sharks	3–2	OT	Hiller (7–5–1)	Niittymaki (5–1–2)	17,562	8–7–1	HP Pavilion at San Jose	W4	17
17	November 10	Islanders	1–0		McElhinney (2–2–0)	Roloson (2–6–0)	14,393	9–7–1	Honda Center	W5	19
18	November 12	Stars	4–2		Hiller (8–5–1)	Lehtonen (7–6–0)	13,831	10–7–1	Honda Center	W6	21
19	November 14	@ Blackhawks	3–2	OT	Crawford (2–4–0)	Hiller (8–5–2)	21,224	10–7–2	United Center	O1	22
20	November 16	@ Stars	2–1		Lehtonen (8–6–0)	Hiller (8–6–2)	13,443	10–8–2	American Airlines Center	L1	22
21	November 17	@ Wild	2–1	OT	Backstrom (8–4–2)	McElhinney (2–2–1)	16,890	10–8–3	Xcel Energy Center	O1	23
22	November 19	Blue Jackets	4–3		Mason (6–6–0)	Hiller (8–7–2)	13,667	10–9–3	Honda Center	L1	23
23	November 21	Oilers	4–2		Dubnyk (1–0–3)	Hiller (8–8–2)	14,267	10–10–3	Honda Center	L2	23
24	November 26	Blackhawks	4–1		Crawford (4–4–0)	Hiller (8–9–2)	16,146	10–11–3	Honda Center	L3	23
25	November 27	@ Coyotes	6–4		Hiller (9–9–2)	Bryzgalov (10–3–5)	12,708	11–11–3	Jobing.com Arena	W1	25
26	November 29	Kings	2–0		Hiller (10–9–2)	Quick (11–5–0)	17,174	12–11–3	Honda Center	W2	27

December: 8–6–1 (home: 4–2–0; road: 4–4–1)

#	Date	Opponent	Score	OT	Win	Loss	Attendance	Record	Arena	Box	Points
27	December 1	Panthers	5–3		Hiller (11–9–2)	Vokoun (9–9–0)	12,504	13–11–3	Honda Center	W3	29
28	December 3	Red Wings	4–0		Howard (15–2–2)	Hiller (11–10–2)	15,173	13–12–3	Honda Center	L1	29
29	December 5	Coyotes	3–0		Bryzgalov (11–4–6)	Hiller (11–11–2)	14,062	13–13–3	Honda Center	L2	29
30	December 7	@ Oilers	3–2	SO	Hiller (12–11–2)	Khabibulin (6–10–2)	16,839	14–13–3	Rexall Place	W1	31
31	December 8	@ Canucks	5–4	SO	Luongo (12–8–2)	Hiller (12–11–3)	18,860	14–13–4	Rogers Arena	O1	32
32	December 10	Flames	3–2	SO	Hiller (13–11–3)	Karlsson (2–1–2)	13,775	15–13–4	Honda Center	W1	34
33	December 12	Wild	6–2		Hiller (14–11–3)	Backstrom (9–8–3)	14,338	16–13–4	Honda Center	W2	36
34	December 15	@ Capitals	2–1	OT	Hiller (15–11–3)	Varlamov (4–4–1)	18,398	17–13–4	Verizon Center	W3	38
35	December 16	@ Islanders	3–2		DiPietro (4–6–4)	McElhinney (2–3–1)	7,659	17–14–4	Nassau Memorial Coliseum	L1	38
36	December 18	@ Hurricanes	4–2		Ward (14–9–3)	Hiller (15–12–3)	16,603	17–15–4	RBC Center	L2	38
37	December 20	@ Bruins	3–0		Hiller (16–12–3)	Thomas (15–4–3)	17,565	18–15–4	TD Garden	W1	40
38	December 21	@ Sabres	5–2		Miller (12–10–3)	McElhinney (2–4–1)	18,690	18–16–4	HSBC Arena	L1	40
39	December 26	@ Kings	4–1		Bernier (4–5–0)	Hiller (16–13–3)	18,313	18–17–4	Staples Center	L2	40
40	December 28	@ Coyotes	3–1		Hiller (17–13–3)	Bryzgalov (12–7–6)	14,032	19–17–4	Jobing.com Arena	W1	42
41	December 31	Flyers	5–2		Hiller (18–13–3)	Bobrovsky (15–6–3)	17,103	20–17–4	Honda Center	W2	44

January: 8–3–0 (home: 5–1–0; road: 3–2–0)

#	Date	Opponent	Score	OT	Win	Loss	Attendance	Record	Arena	Box	Points
42	January 2	Blackhawks	2–1		Hiller (19–13–3)	Crawford (11–7–1)	16,004	21–17–4	Honda Center	W3	46
43	January 5	Predators	4–1		Rinne (11–10–4)	Hiller (19–14–3)	12,216	21–18–4	Honda Center	L1	46
44	January 7	Blue Jackets	6–0		Hiller (20–14–3)	Mason (12–11–1)	12,815	22–18–4	Honda Center	W1	48
45	January 9	Sharks	1–0		Hiller (21–14–3)	Niemi (9–12–2)	16,172	23–18–4	Honda Center	W2	50
46	January 12	Blues	7–4		Hiller (22–14–3)	Conklin (5–3–2)	12,499	24–18–4	Honda Center	W3	52
47	January 15	Coyotes	6–2		Bryzgalov (17–8–6)	Hiller (22–15–3)	10,951	24–19–4	Jobing.com Arena	L1	52
48	January 16	Oilers	3–2		McElhinney (3–4–1)	Khabibulin (8–19–2)	15,764	25–19–4	Honda Center	W1	54
49	January 18	@ Senators	2–1	SO	Hiller (23–15–3)	Elliott (12–16–6)	19,515	26–19–4	Scotiabank Place	W2	56
50	January 20	@ Maple Leafs	5–2		Giguere (9–7–3)	Hiller (23–16–3)	19,399	26–20–4	Air Canada Centre	L1	56
51	January 22	@ Canadiens	4–3	SO	Hiller (24–16–3)	Price (24–16–4)	21,273	27–20–4	Bell Centre	W1	58
52	January 25	@ Blue Jackets	3–2		Hiller (25–16–3)	Mason (15–12–2)	11,700	28–20–4	Nationwide Arena	W2	60
Jan. 30: All-Star Game (Lidstrom wins—box)			11–10		Thomas (BOS)	Lundqvist (NYR)	18,680		RBC Center	Raleigh, NC	

February: 5–5–1 (home: 1–3–1; road: 4–2–0)

#	Date	Opponent	Score	OT	Win	Loss	Attendance	Record	Arena	Box	Points
53	February 2	Sharks	4–3		Niemi (14–13–3)	McElhinney (3–5–1)	14,486	28–21–4	Honda Center	L1	60
54	February 5	@ Avalanche	3–0		McElhinney (4–5–1)	Budaj (12–8–3)	16,785	29–21–4	Pepsi Center	W1	62
55	February 9	@ Canucks	4–3		McElhinney (5–5–1)	Schneider (9–3–2)	18,860	30–21–4	Rogers Arena	W2	64
56	February 11	@ Flames	5–4	OT	McElhinney (6–5–1)	Kiprusoff (24–18–4)	19,289	31–21–4	Scotiabank Saddledome	W3	66
57	February 13	@ Oilers	4–0		Hiller (26–16–3)	Dubnyk (6–7–6)	16,839	32–21–4	Rexall Place	W4	68
58	February 16	Capitals	7–6		Neuvirth (17–8–4)	McElhinney (6–6–1)	15,579	32–22–4	Honda Center	L1	68
59	February 18	@ Wild	5–1		Backstrom (19–13–3)	McElhinney (6–7–1)	18,967	32–23–4	Xcel Energy Center	L2	68
60	February 19	@ Blues	9–3		Bishop (1–0–0)	McElhinney (6–8–1)	19,150	32–24–4	Scottrade Center	L3	68
61	February 23	Kings	3–2		Quick (27–15–2)	McElhinney‡ (6–9–1)	17,174	32–25–4	Honda Center	L4	68
62	February 25	Wild	3–2	OT	Theodore (11–9–2)	Ellis† (0–0–1)	13,617	32–25–5	Honda Center	O1	69
63	February 27	Avalanche	3–2		Ellis (1–0–1)	Budaj (13–13–4)	14,510	33–25–5	Honda Center	W1	71

March: 11–3–0 (home: 6–2–0; road: 5–1–0)

#	Date	Opponent	Score	OT	Win	Loss	Attendance	Record	Arena	Box	Points
64	March 2	Red Wings	2–1	OT	Ellis (2–0–1)	Howard (31–12–4)	15,098	34–25–5	Honda Center	W2	73
65	March 4	Stars	4–3	OT	Ellis (3–0–1)	Lehtonen (26–18–7)	12,883	35–25–5	Honda Center	W3	75
66	March 6	Canucks	3–0		Schneider (12–3–2)	Ellis (3–1–1)	16,356	35–26–5	Honda Center	L1	75
67	March 9	Rangers	5–2		Ellis (4–1–1)	Lundqvist (27–24–4)	14,251	36–26–5	Honda Center	W1	77
68	March 11	@ Avalanche	6–2		Ellis (5–1–1)	Elliott (13–23–9)	16,244	37–26–5	Pepsi Center	W2	79
69	March 13	Coyotes	5–2		Bryzgalov (30–17–8)	Ellis (5–2–1)	14,326	37–27–5	Honda Center	L1	79
70	March 16	Blues	2–1		Emery (1–0–0)	Halak (21–19–6)	12,604	38–27–5	Honda Center	W1	81
71	March 19	@ Kings	2–1	OT	Emery (2–0–0)	Quick (30–18–3)	18,118	39–27–5	Staples Center	W2	83
72	March 20	Flames	5–4	OT	Ellis (6–2–1)	Karlsson (4–5–5)	15,177	40–27–5	Honda Center	W3	85
73	March 23	@ Stars	4–3	OT	Emery (3–0–0)	Lehtonen (30–20–10)	16,021	41–27–5	American Airlines Center	W4	87
74	March 24	@ Predators	5–4		Rinne (29–20–8)	Ellis (6–3–1)	17,113	41–28–5	Bridgestone Arena	L1	87
75	March 26	@ Blackhawks	2–1		Emery (4–0–0)	Crawford (29–15–5)	22,115	42–28–5	United Center	W1	89
76	March 28	Avalanche	5–4		Emery (5–0–0)	Elliott (15–25–9)	14,336	43–28–5	Honda Center	W2	91
77	March 30	@ Flames	4–2		Emery (6–0–0)	Kiprusoff (34–24–6)	19,289	44–28–5	Scotiabank Saddledome	W3	93

April: 3–2–0 (home: 2–1–0; road: 1–1–0)

#	Date	Opponent	Score	OT	Win	Loss	Attendance	Record	Arena	Box	Points
78	April 2	@ Sharks	4–2		Niemi (33–17–6)	Emery (6–1–0)	17,562	44–29–5	HP Pavilion at San Jose	L1	93
79	April 3	Stars	4–3		Lehtonen (31–23–11)	Emery (6–2–0)	16,424	44–30–5	Honda Center	L2	93
80	April 6	Sharks	6–2		Emery (7–2–0)	Niittymaki (12–7–3)	15,649	45–30–5	Honda Center	W1	95
81	April 8	Kings	2–1		Ellis (7–3–1)	Quick (35–21–3)	17,587	46–30–5	Honda Center	W2	97
82	April 9	@ Kings	3–1		Ellis (8–3–1)	Quick (35–22–3)	18,203	47–30–5	Staples Center	W3	99

Final games legend
Ducks Win (2 pts.)	Ducks Loss (0 pts.)	OT Loss (1 pt.)	All-Star Game	Clinched Playoffs

"Points" Legend
1st (Pacific Division)	Not in Playoff Position	In Playoff Position

=== Postseason ===
2011 Postseason Game Log
Western Conference Quarterfinals (2–4)

#	Date	Opponent	Score	OT	Win	Loss	Attendance	Series	Arena	Box
1	April 13	Predators	4–1		Rinne (1–0)	Ellis (0–1)	17,174	0–1	Honda Center	L1
2	April 15	Predators	5–3		Emery (1–0)	Rinne (1–1)	17,174	1–1	Honda Center	W1
3	April 17	@ Predators	4–3		Rinne (2–1)	Emery (1–1)	17,113	1–2	Bridgestone Arena	L2
4	April 20	@ Predators	6–3		Emery (2–1)	Rinne (2–2)	17,113	2–2	Bridgestone Arena	W2
5	April 22	Predators	4–3	OT	Rinne (3–2)	Emery (2–2)	17,385	2–3	Honda Center	L3
6	April 24	@ Predators	4–2		Rinne (4–2)	Emery (2–3)	17,113	2–4	Bridgestone Arena	L4

Legend
Ducks Win	Ducks Loss

== Standings ==
=== Divisional standings ===
Pacific Division
		GP	W	L	OTL	ROW	GF	GA	Pts
**1**	**y-San Jose Sharks**	**82**	**48**	**25**	**9**	**43**	**248**	**213**	**105**
**2**	**Anaheim Ducks**	**82**	**47**	**30**	**5**	**43**	**239**	**235**	**99**
**3**	**Phoenix Coyotes**	**82**	**43**	**26**	**13**	**38**	**231**	**226**	**99**
**4**	**Los Angeles Kings**	**82**	**46**	**30**	**6**	**36**	**219**	**198**	**98**
5	Dallas Stars	82	42	29	11	37	227	233	95

=== Conference standings ===
Western Conference
R		Div	GP	W	L	OTL	ROW	GF	GA	Pts
**1**	**p – Vancouver Canucks**	**NW**	**82**	**54**	**19**	**9**	**50**	**262**	**185**	117
**2**	**y – San Jose Sharks**	**PA**	**82**	**48**	**25**	**9**	**43**	**248**	**213**	105
**3**	**y – Detroit Red Wings**	**CE**	**82**	**47**	**25**	**10**	**43**	**261**	**241**	104
**4**	**Anaheim Ducks**	**PA**	**82**	**47**	**30**	**5**	**43**	**239**	**235**	99
**5**	**Nashville Predators**	**CE**	**82**	**44**	**27**	**11**	**38**	**219**	**194**	99
**6**	**Phoenix Coyotes**	**PA**	**82**	**43**	**26**	**13**	**38**	**231**	**226**	99
**7**	**Los Angeles Kings**	**PA**	**82**	**46**	**30**	**6**	**36**	**219**	**198**	98
**8**	**Chicago Blackhawks**	**CE**	**82**	**44**	**29**	**9**	**38**	**258**	**225**	97
8.5
9	Dallas Stars	PA	82	42	29	11	37	227	233	95
10	Calgary Flames	NW	82	41	29	12	32	250	237	94
11	St. Louis Blues	CE	82	38	33	11	34	240	234	87
12	Minnesota Wild	NW	82	39	35	8	36	206	233	86
13	Columbus Blue Jackets	CE	82	34	35	13	29	215	258	81
14	Colorado Avalanche	NW	82	30	44	8	24	227	288	68
15	Edmonton Oilers	NW	82	25	45	12	23	193	269	62

bold – qualified for playoffs; y – Won division; p – Won President's Trophy (best record in NHL)
CE – Central Division, NW – Northwest Division, PA – Pacific Division

== Player statistics ==
=== Skaters ===
Note: GP = Games played; G = Goals; A = Assists; Pts = Points; +/− = Plus/minus; PIM = Penalty minutes

Regular season

Player	GP	G	A	Pts	+/−	PIM
Corey Perry	82	50	48	98	9	104
Teemu Selanne	73	31	49	80	6	49
Ryan Getzlaf	67	19	57	76	14	35
Bobby Ryan	82	34	37	71	15	61
Lubomir Visnovsky	81	18	50	68	18	24
Saku Koivu	75	15	30	45	-8	36
Cam Fowler	76	10	30	40	-25	20
Jason Blake	76	16	16	32	-5	41
Toni Lydman	78	3	22	25	32	42
Brandon McMillan	60	11	10	21	-5	18
Dan Sexton	47	4	9	13	-6	4
Joffrey Lupul^{‡}	26	5	8	13	-4	14
Luca Sbisa	68	2	9	11	-11	43
Matt Beleskey	35	3	7	10	-10	36
Todd Marchant	79	1	7	8	-18	26
Andreas Lilja	52	1	6	7	-15	28
Francois Beauchemin^{†}	27	3	2	5	-4	16
George Parros	78	3	1	4	-4	171
Andy Sutton	39	0	4	4	1	87
Ryan Carter^{‡}	18	1	2	3	-4	22
Maxim Lapierre^{†‡}	21	0	3	3	-6	9
Kyle Chipchura	40	0	2	2	1	32
Jarkko Ruutu^{†}	23	1	1	2	0	38
Brad Winchester^{†}	19	1	1	2	-9	28
Danny Syvret^{‡}	6	1	1	2	-3	4
Paul Mara^{‡}	33	1	1	2	-1	40
Kyle Palmieri	10	1	0	1	-1	0
Brendan Mikkelson^{‡}	5	0	1	1	-1	7
Troy Bodie^{‡}	9	0	1	1	-3	7
Nick Bonino	26	0	0	0	-3	4
Sheldon Brookbank	40	0	0	0	-8	63
Josh Green	12	0	0	0	-3	6
Aaron Voros^{‡}	12	0	0	0	-4	43
Brett Festerling^{‡}	1	0	0	0	-2	0

Playoffs

Player	GP	G	A	Pts	+/−	PIM
Corey Perry	6	2	6	8	0	4
Saku Koivu	6	1	6	7	-2	6
Teemu Selanne	6	6	1	7	-3	12
Ryan Getzlaf	6	2	4	6	0	9
Cam Fowler	6	1	3	4	1	2
Jason Blake	6	3	1	4	-3	0
Bobby Ryan	4	3	1	4	2	2
Lubomir Visnovsky	6	0	3	3	-2	2
Francois Beauchemin	6	0	2	2	1	2
Brandon McMillan	6	1	1	2	0	0
Todd Marchant	6	0	1	1	-3	4
Luca Sbisa	6	0	1	1	-4	8
Matt Beleskey	6	1	0	1	-1	4
Toni Lydman	6	0	0	0	-2	2
Andy Sutton	1	0	0	0	0	2
Jarkko Ruutu	3	0	0	0	-1	12
George Parros	6	0	0	0	-1	16
Brad Winchester	3	0	0	0	0	4
Andreas Lilja	3	0	0	0	1	0
Sheldon Brookbank	4	0	0	0	-2	14
Nick Bonino	4	0	0	0	-1	2
Dan Sexton	1	0	0	0	0	2
Kyle Palmieri	1	0	0	0	0	0

=== Goaltenders ===
Note: GP = Games played; GS = Games Started; TOI = Time on ice (minutes); W = Wins; L = Losses; OT = Overtime losses; GA = Goals against; GAA= Goals against average; SA= Shots against; SV= Saves; Sv% = Save percentage; SO= Shutouts

Regular season

Player	GP	GS	TOI	W	L	OT	GA	GAA	SA	Sv%	SO	G	A	PIM
Jonas Hiller	49	46	2672	26	16	3	114	2.56	1493	.924	5	0	1	0
Dan Ellis^{†}	13	11	729	8	3	1	29	2.39	348	.917	0	0	0	0
Ray Emery	10	9	527	7	2	0	20	2.28	272	.926	0	0	0	0
Curtis McElhinney^{‡}	21	16	996	6	9	1	57	3.43	516	.890	2	0	1	0
Timo Pielmeier	1	0	40	0	0	0	5	7.50	12	.583	0	0	0	0

Playoffs

Player	GP	TOI	W	L	GA	GAA	SA	Sv%	SO	G	A	PIM
Ray Emery	6	319	2	3	17	3.20	165	.897	0	0	0	0
Dan Ellis	1	41	0	1	4	5.85	24	.833	0	0	0	0

^{†}Denotes player spent time with another team before joining Ducks. Stats reflect time with Ducks only.
^{‡}Traded mid-season.
Bold/italics denotes franchise record

== Awards and records ==
=== Awards ===
2010–11 NHL Awards
Player	Award	Awarded
Corey Perry	Hart Memorial Trophy	June 22, 2011
Corey Perry	Maurice "Rocket" Richard Trophy	June 22, 2011

Regular Season
Player	Award	Awarded
Ryan Getzlaf	NHL Third Star of the Week	October 18, 2010
Jonas Hiller	NHL Second Star of the Week	January 10, 2011
Corey Perry	NHL Third Star of the Week	February 7, 2011
Corey Perry	NHL Third Star of the Week	March 14, 2011
Ray Emery	NHL Second Star of the Week	March 21, 2011
Corey Perry	NHL Second Star of the Week	March 28, 2011
Corey Perry	NHL First Star of the Month	March 2011
Corey Perry	NHL First Star of the Week	April 4, 2011
Dan Ellis	NHL Third Star of the Week	April 11, 2011

=== Milestones ===
Regular Season
Player	Milestone	Reached
Cam Fowler	1st Career NHL Game	October 8, 2010
Cam Fowler	1st Career NHL Assist; 1st Career NHL Point	October 9, 2010
Cam Fowler	1st Career NHL Goal	October 17, 2010
Toni Lydman	200th Career NHL Point	October 17, 2010
George Parros	300th Career NHL Game	October 30, 2010
Kyle Palmieri	1st Career NHL Game; 1st Career NHL Goal; 1st Career NHL Point	November 3, 2010
Teemu Selanne	1,200th Career NHL Game	November 5, 2010
Saku Koivu	700th Career NHL Point	November 7, 2010
Curtis McElhinney	1st Career NHL Shutout	November 10, 2010
Paul Mara	700th Career NHL Game	November 14, 2010
Brandon McMillan	1st Career NHL Game	November 21, 2010
Brandon McMillan	1st Career NHL Goal; 1st Career NHL Point	November 27, 2010
Corey Perry	300th Career NHL Point	December 8, 2010
Brandon McMillan	1st Career NHL Assist	December 10, 2010
Corey Perry	400th Career NHL Game	December 10, 2010
Bobby Ryan	200th Career NHL Game	December 10, 2010
Joffrey Lupul	400th Career NHL Game	December 12, 2010
Ryan Getzlaf	400th Career NHL Game	December 20, 2010
Andreas Lilja	500th Career NHL Game	December 20, 2010
Saku Koivu	900th Career NHL Game	December 21, 2010
Andy Sutton	600th Career NHL Game	December 21, 2010
Luca Sbisa	1st Career NHL Goal	December 28, 2010
Lubomir Visnovsky	100th Career NHL Goal	December 31, 2010
Toni Lydman	700th Career NHL Game	January 7, 2011
Teemu Selanne	1,300th Career NHL Point	January 16, 2011
Maxim Lapierre	300th Career NHL Game	January 18, 2011
Jason Blake	800th Career NHL Game; 200th Career NHL Goal	January 25, 2011
Saku Koivu	500th Career NHL Assist	February 2, 2011
Lubomir Visnovsky	400th Career NHL Point	February 16, 2011
Timo Pielmeier	1st Career NHL Game	February 19, 2011
Bobby Ryan	100th Career NHL Goal	February 25, 2011
Lubomir Visnovsky	300th Career NHL Assist	March 2, 2011
Luca Sbisa	100th Career NHL Game	March 9, 2011
Ryan Getzlaf	400th Career NHL Point	March 20, 2011
Francois Beauchemin	400th Career NHL Game	March 23, 2011
Teemu Selanne	700th Career NHL Assist	March 28, 2011
Lubomir Visnovsky	700th Career NHL Game	April 3, 2011
Corey Perry	200th Career NHL Assist	April 6, 2011
Bobby Ryan	200th Career NHL Point	April 6, 2011

Playoffs
Player	Milestone	Reached
Matt Beleskey	1st Career NHL Playoff Game	April 13, 2011
Cam Fowler	1st Career NHL Playoff Game	April 13, 2011
Brandon McMillan	1st Career NHL Playoff Game	April 13, 2011
Nick Bonino	1st Career NHL Playoff Game	April 15, 2011
Cam Fowler	1st Career NHL Playoff Assist; 1st Career NHL Playoff Point	April 15, 2011
Matt Beleskey	1st Career NHL Playoff Goal; 1st Career NHL Playoff Point	April 17, 2011
Kyle Palmieri	1st Career NHL Playoff Game	April 13, 2011
Cam Fowler	1st Career NHL Playoff Goal	April 20, 2011
Brandon McMillan	1st Career NHL Playoff Goal; 1st Career NHL Playoff Assist; 1st Career NHL Playoff Point	April 20, 2011
Luca Sbisa	1st Career NHL Playoff Assist; 1st Career NHL Playoff Point	April 22, 2011
Dan Sexton	1st Career NHL Playoff Game	April 24, 2011

== Transactions ==
The Ducks have been involved in the following transactions during the 2010–11 season.

=== Trades ===
Date	Details
May 28, 2010	To Pittsburgh Penguins Mattias Modig	To Anaheim Ducks 6th-round pick in 2010 – Kevin Lind
June 26, 2010	To Toronto Maple Leafs Mike Brown	To Anaheim Ducks 5th-round pick in 2010 – Chris Wagner
June 30, 2010	To Calgary Flames Logan MacMillan; Conditional 7th-round pick in 2013 (Note: Condition not satisfied.)	To Anaheim Ducks Jason Jaffray; Conditional 7th-round pick in 2013 (Note: Condition not satisfied.)
July 9, 2010	To New York Rangers Steve Eminger	To Anaheim Ducks Aaron Voros; Ryan Hillier
July 19, 2010	To New York Rangers Matt McCue	To Anaheim Ducks Tomas Zaborsky
July 30, 2010	To New York Islanders James Wisniewski	To Anaheim Ducks Conditional 3rd-round pick in 2011 – Joseph Cramarossa
November 21, 2010	To Philadelphia Flyers Rob Bordson; Danny Syvret	To Anaheim Ducks David Laliberte; Patrick Maroon
November 23, 2010	To New York Rangers Stu Bickel	To Anaheim Ducks Nigel Williams
November 23, 2010	To Carolina Hurricanes Ryan Carter	To Anaheim Ducks Stefan Chaput; Matt Kennedy
December 31, 2010	To Montreal Canadiens Brett Festerling; 5th-round pick in 2012 (Note: Pick later traded back to Anaheim Ducks.) – Brian Cooper	To Anaheim Ducks Maxim Lapierre
January 4, 2011	To Columbus Blue Jackets Trevor Smith	To Anaheim Ducks Nate Guenin
February 9, 2011	To Toronto Maple Leafs Joffrey Lupul; Jake Gardiner; Conditional 5th-round pick in 2013 (Note: Pick later traded to Chicago Blackhawks, then to San Jose Sharks.) – Fredrik Bergvik	To Anaheim Ducks Francois Beauchemin
February 15, 2011	To Toronto Maple Leafs Aaron Voros	To Anaheim Ducks Conditional 7th-round pick in 2011 (Note: Condition not satisfied.)
February 17, 2011	To Montreal Canadiens Paul Mara	To Anaheim Ducks 5th-round pick in 2012 – Brian Cooper
February 17, 2011	To Ottawa Senators 6th-round pick in 2011 – Max McCormick	To Anaheim Ducks Jarkko Ruutu
February 24, 2011	To Tampa Bay Lightning Curtis McElhinney	To Anaheim Ducks Dan Ellis
February 27, 2011	To Boston Bruins David Laliberte; Stefan Chaput	To Anaheim Ducks Brian McGrattan; Sean Zimmerman
February 28, 2011	To Vancouver Canucks Maxim Lapierre; MacGregor Sharp	To Anaheim Ducks Joel Perrault; 3rd-round pick in 2012 – Frederik Andersen
February 28, 2011	To St. Louis Blues 3rd-round pick in 2012 – Mackenzie MacEachern	To Anaheim Ducks Brad Winchester

=== Free agents acquired ===
Player	Former team	Contract terms
Toni Lydman	Buffalo Sabres	3 years, $9 million
Trevor Smith	Bridgeport Sound Tigers (NYI)	1 year, $550,000
Josh Green	Modo Hockey	1 year, $575,000
Danny Syvret	Philadelphia Flyers	1 year, $600,000
Andy Sutton	Ottawa Senators	2 years, $4.25 million
Paul Mara	Montreal Canadiens	1 year, $750,000
Andreas Lilja	Detroit Red Wings	1 year, $600,000
Ray Emery	Philadelphia Flyers	1 year, $500,000
Rick Schofield	Lake Superior State University	1 year, $750,000 entry-level contract

=== Free agents lost ===
Player	New team	Contract terms
Joey MacDonald	Detroit Red Wings	1 year, $550,000
Brennan Evans	St. Louis Blues	2 years, $1.025 million
Nathan Oystrick	St. Louis Blues	1 year, $600,000

=== Claimed via waivers ===
Player	Former team	Date claimed off waivers

=== Lost via waivers ===
Player	New team	Date claimed off waivers
Brendan Mikkelson	Calgary Flames	October 19, 2010
Troy Bodie	Carolina Hurricanes	November 16, 2010

=== Lost via retirement ===
Player
Scott Niedermayer
Aaron Ward

=== Players signings ===
Player	Contract terms
Josh Brittain	3 years, $1.73 million entry-level contract
Brandon McMillan	3 years, $2.0625 million entry-level contract
Sheldon Brookbank	2 years, $1.5 million
Kyle Chipchura	1 year, $650,000
Jean-Philippe Levasseur	1 year, $500,000
Saku Koivu	2 years, $5 million
Brendan Mikkelson	1 year, $687,500
Cam Fowler	3 years, $4.2 million entry-level contract
James Wisniewski	1 year, $3.25 million
Kyle Palmieri	3 years, $3.225 million entry-level contract
Teemu Selanne	1 year, $3.25 million
Bobby Ryan	5 years, $25.5 million
Matt Beleskey	2 years, $1.475 million contract extension
Igor Bobkov	3 years, $2.12 million entry-level contract
Devante Smith-Pelly	3 years, $2.25 million entry-level contract
Luca Sbisa	4 years, $8.7 million contract extension

== Draft picks ==
The 2010 NHL entry draft in Los Angeles, took place from June 25–26, 2010. The Ducks had the 12th pick in the first round by virtue of finishing 11th in 2009–10 and not making any gains in the lottery that took place on Tuesday April 13, 2010. With their two picks in the first round, the Ducks took Cam Fowler, a defenseman from the Windsor Spitfires of the OHL and Long Beach-native Emerson Etem, a right winger from the Medicine Hat Tigers of the WHL. Both were ranked quite high by many analysts (Fowler as high as No. 3 and Etem as high as #8), however, things seemed to be working in the Ducks' favor picking them up at No. 12 and No. 29 respectively. Many analysts believe that because the Ducks' picks were ranked so high and they got them relatively low in the draft that the Ducks were one of the big winners at the 2010 draft.

The Ducks picks at the 2010 NHL entry draft in Los Angeles:

Round	#	Player	Position	Nationality	College/Junior/Club team (League)
1	12	Cam Fowler	Defense	United States	Windsor Spitfires (OHL)
1	29 ^{1}	Emerson Etem	Right wing	United States	Medicine Hat Tigers (WHL)
2	42	Devante Smith-Pelly	Right wing	Canada	Mississauga St. Michael's Majors (OHL)
5	122 ^{2}	Chris Wagner	Right wing	United States	South Shore Kings (EJHL)
5	132	Tim Heed	Defense	Sweden	Södertälje SK (Elitserien)
6	161 ^{3}	Andreas Dahlstrom	Center	Sweden	AIK (Elitserien)
6	177 ^{4}	Kevin Lind	Defense	United States	Chicago Steel (USHL)
7	192	Brett Perlini	Right wing	Canada	Michigan State University (CCHA)

1. Acquired Pick from Philadelphia
2. Acquired Pick from Toronto
3. Acquired Pick from Dallas
4. Acquired Pick from Montreal via Pittsburgh

== Minor league affiliates ==
=== Syracuse Crunch ===
The Syracuse Crunch, based in Syracuse, NY will be the Ducks AHL affiliate for the 2010–11 season. The multiyear partnership was announced March 25, 2010.

=== Elmira Jackals ===
The Bakersfield Condors, based in Bakersfield, CA were the Ducks ECHL affiliate for the 2009–10 season. The Condors were the Ducks affiliate in the ECHL since 2008, however, following the Ducks deal with the AHL's Syracuse Crunch, Anaheim found a new affiliate on the east coast: the Elmira Jackals.

== See also ==
- Anaheim Ducks
- Honda Center
- 2010–11 NHL season

=== Other Anaheim–based teams in 2010–11 ===
- Los Angeles Angels of Anaheim (Angel Stadium of Anaheim)
  - 2010 Los Angeles Angels of Anaheim season
  - 2011 Los Angeles Angels of Anaheim season
