= 2010–11 Los Angeles Kings season =

National Hockey League team season

2010–11 Los Angeles Kings
- Division: 4th Pacific
- Conference: 7th Western
- 2010–11 record: 46–30–6
- Home record: 25–13–3
- Road record: 21–17–3
- Goals for: 219
- Goals against: 198

Team information
- General manager: Dean Lombardi
- Coach: Terry Murray
- Captain: Dustin Brown
- Alternate captains: Matt Greene; Anze Kopitar
- Arena: Staples Center

Team leaders
- Goals: Dustin Brown (28)
- Assists: Anze Kopitar (48)
- Points: Anze Kopitar (73)
- Penalty minutes: Kyle Clifford (141)
- Plus/minus: Anze Kopitar (+25)
- Wins: Jonathan Quick (35)
- Goals against average: Jonathan Quick (2.24)

The 2010–11 Los Angeles Kings season was the 44th season of operation (43rd season of play) for the National Hockey League (NHL) franchise.

== Pre-season ==
2010 Pre-season game log: 3–1–2 (Home: 1–1–0; Road: 1–0–2; Neutral: 1–0–0)
#	Date	Visitor	Score	Home	OT	Decision	Record	Recap
1	September 22	Los Angeles Kings	4–2	Colorado Avalanche		Bernier	1–0–0
2	September 23	Los Angeles Kings (SS)	1–2	Phoenix Coyotes (SS)	OT	Zatkoff	1–0–1
3	September 23	Phoenix Coyotes (SS)	3–1	Los Angeles Kings (SS)		Quick	1–1–1
4	September 28	Anaheim Ducks	3–8	Los Angeles Kings		Quick	2–1–1
5	October 2 (Las Vegas)	Colorado Avalanche	2–3	Los Angeles Kings		Quick	3–1–1
6	October 3	Los Angeles Kings	2–3	Anaheim Ducks	OT	Bernier	3–1–2
(SS) = Split-squad games.

== Regular season ==
The Kings came out on fire to start the season, and took the lead in the Western Conference standings. Despite an injury to Drew Doughty, the team started with a 12–3 win–loss record into November, including a six-game win streak.

The Kings concluded the regular season having tied the New Jersey Devils for the fewest power-play goals allowed, with 40.

== Standings ==
=== Divisional standings ===
Pacific Division
		GP	W	L	OTL	ROW	GF	GA	Pts
**1**	**y-San Jose Sharks**	**82**	**48**	**25**	**9**	**43**	**248**	**213**	**105**
**2**	**Anaheim Ducks**	**82**	**47**	**30**	**5**	**43**	**239**	**235**	**99**
**3**	**Phoenix Coyotes**	**82**	**43**	**26**	**13**	**38**	**231**	**226**	**99**
**4**	**Los Angeles Kings**	**82**	**46**	**30**	**6**	**36**	**219**	**198**	**98**
5	Dallas Stars	82	42	29	11	37	227	233	95

=== Conference standings ===
Western Conference
R		Div	GP	W	L	OTL	ROW	GF	GA	Pts
**1**	**p – Vancouver Canucks**	**NW**	**82**	**54**	**19**	**9**	**50**	**262**	**185**	117
**2**	**y – San Jose Sharks**	**PA**	**82**	**48**	**25**	**9**	**43**	**248**	**213**	105
**3**	**y – Detroit Red Wings**	**CE**	**82**	**47**	**25**	**10**	**43**	**261**	**241**	104
**4**	**Anaheim Ducks**	**PA**	**82**	**47**	**30**	**5**	**43**	**239**	**235**	99
**5**	**Nashville Predators**	**CE**	**82**	**44**	**27**	**11**	**38**	**219**	**194**	99
**6**	**Phoenix Coyotes**	**PA**	**82**	**43**	**26**	**13**	**38**	**231**	**226**	99
**7**	**Los Angeles Kings**	**PA**	**82**	**46**	**30**	**6**	**36**	**219**	**198**	98
**8**	**Chicago Blackhawks**	**CE**	**82**	**44**	**29**	**9**	**38**	**258**	**225**	97
8.5
9	Dallas Stars	PA	82	42	29	11	37	227	233	95
10	Calgary Flames	NW	82	41	29	12	32	250	237	94
11	St. Louis Blues	CE	82	38	33	11	34	240	234	87
12	Minnesota Wild	NW	82	39	35	8	36	206	233	86
13	Columbus Blue Jackets	CE	82	34	35	13	29	215	258	81
14	Colorado Avalanche	NW	82	30	44	8	24	227	288	68
15	Edmonton Oilers	NW	82	25	45	12	23	193	269	62

bold – qualified for playoffs; y – Won division; p – Won President's Trophy (best record in NHL)
CE – Central Division, NW – Northwest Division, PA – Pacific Division

== Schedule and results ==
2010–11 Kings schedule at nhl.com

2010–11 Game Log

October: 8–3–0 (Home: 4–0–0; Road: 4–3–0)
#	Date	Visitor	Score	Home	OT	Decision	Attendance	Record	Pts	Recap
1	October 9	Los Angeles Kings	2–1	Vancouver Canucks	SO	Quick	18,860	1–0–0	2
2	October 10	Los Angeles Kings	1–3	Calgary Flames		Bernier	19,289	1–1–0	2
3	October 12	Atlanta Thrashers	1–3	Los Angeles Kings		Quick	18,118	2–1–0	4
4	October 15	Vancouver Canucks	1–4	Los Angeles Kings		Quick	18,118	3–1–0	6
5	October 20	Carolina Hurricanes	3–4	Los Angeles Kings		Bernier	17,769	4–1–0	8
6	October 21	Los Angeles Kings	2–4	Phoenix Coyotes		Quick	6,706	4–2–0	8
7	October 23	Los Angeles Kings	6–4	Colorado Avalanche		Quick	15,478	5–2–0	10
8	October 25	Los Angeles Kings	3–2	Minnesota Wild	SO	Quick	17,094	6–2–0	12
9	October 27	Los Angeles Kings	1–3	Chicago Blackhawks		Bernier	20,667	6–3–0	12
10	October 28	Los Angeles Kings	5–2	Dallas Stars		Quick	11,306	7–3–0	14
11	October 30	New Jersey Devils	1–3	Los Angeles Kings		Quick	18,118	8–3–0	16

November: 5–7–0 (Home: 4–2–0; Road: 1–5–0)
#	Date	Visitor	Score	Home	OT	Decision	Attendance	Record	Pts	Recap
12	November 4	Tampa Bay Lightning	0–1	Los Angeles Kings		Quick	18,118	9–3–0	18
13	November 6	Nashville Predators	1–4	Los Angeles Kings		Bernier	18,118	10–3–0	20
14	November 11	Dallas Stars	1–3	Los Angeles Kings		Quick	18,118	11–3–0	22
15	November 13	New York Islanders	1–5	Los Angeles Kings		Quick	18,118	12–3–0	24
16	November 15	Los Angeles Kings	3–6	San Jose Sharks		Bernier	17,562	12–4–0	24
17	November 17	Columbus Blue Jackets	5–3	Los Angeles Kings		Quick	18,118	12–5–0	24
18	November 19	Los Angeles Kings	2–4	Buffalo Sabres		Bernier	18,418	12–6–0	24
19	November 20	Los Angeles Kings	4–3	Boston Bruins	SO	Quick	17,565	13–6–0	26
20	November 22	Los Angeles Kings	2–3	Ottawa Senators		Quick	18,315	13–7–0	26
21	November 24	Los Angeles Kings	1–4	Montreal Canadiens		Bernier	21,273	13–8–0	26
22	November 27	Chicago Blackhawks	2–1	Los Angeles Kings		Quick	18,118	13–9–0	26
23	November 29	Los Angeles Kings	0–2	Anaheim Ducks		Quick	17,174	13–10–0	26

December: 9–4–1 (Home: 5–1–1; Road: 4–3–0)
#	Date	Visitor	Score	Home	OT	Decision	Attendance	Record	Pts	Recap
24	December 2	Florida Panthers	2–3	Los Angeles Kings		Quick	17,720	14–10–0	28
25	December 4	Detroit Red Wings	2–3	Los Angeles Kings	OT	Quick	18,118	15–10–0	30
26	December 9	Calgary Flames	1–2	Los Angeles Kings		Quick	18,118	16–10–0	32
27	December 11	Minnesota Wild	3–2	Los Angeles Kings	OT	Quick	18,118	16–10–1	33
28	December 13	Los Angeles Kings	5–0	Detroit Red Wings		Quick	17,810	17–10–1	35
29	December 16	Los Angeles Kings	4–6	St. Louis Blues		Quick	19,150	17–11–1	35
30	December 18	Los Angeles Kings	6–1	Nashville Predators		Bernier	16,734	18–11–1	37
31	December 19	Los Angeles Kings	2–3	Chicago Blackhawks		Quick	21,523	18–12–1	37
32	December 21	Los Angeles Kings	5–0	Colorado Avalanche		Quick	15,891	19–12–1	39
33	December 23	Edmonton Oilers	2–3	Los Angeles Kings	SO	Quick	18,118	20–12–1	41
34	December 26	Anaheim Ducks	1–4	Los Angeles Kings		Bernier	18,313	21–12–1	43
35	December 27	Los Angeles Kings	4–0	San Jose Sharks		Quick	17,562	22–12–1	45
36	December 29	Los Angeles Kings	3–6	Phoenix Coyotes		Quick	15,153	22–13–1	45
37	December 30	Philadelphia Flyers	7–4	Los Angeles Kings		Bernier	18,118	22–14–1	45

January: 5–8–0 (Home: 4–6–0; Road: 1–2–0)
#	Date	Visitor	Score	Home	OT	Decision	Attendance	Record	Pts	Recap
38	January 1	San Jose Sharks	1–0	Los Angeles Kings		Quick	18,118	22–15–1	45
39	January 3	Chicago Blackhawks	4–3	Los Angeles Kings		Quick	17,916	22–16–1	45
40	January 6	Nashville Predators	5–2	Los Angeles Kings		Bernier	17,823	22–17–1	45
41	January 8	Columbus Blue Jackets	4–6	Los Angeles Kings		Quick	18,118	23–17–1	47
42	January 10	Toronto Maple Leafs	2–3	Los Angeles Kings		Quick	17,834	23–18–1	47
43	January 13	St. Louis Blues	1–3	Los Angeles Kings		Quick	17,932	23–19–1	47
44	January 15	Edmonton Oilers	2–5	Los Angeles Kings		Bernier	18,118	24–19–1	49
45	January 17	Los Angeles Kings	1–2	Dallas Stars		Bernier	14,163	24–20–1	49
46	January 18	Los Angeles Kings	1–2	St. Louis Blues		Quick	19,150	24–21–1	49
47	January 20	Phoenix Coyotes	2–0	Los Angeles Kings		Quick	18,118	24–22–1	49
48	January 22	Los Angeles Kings	4–3	Phoenix Coyotes		Quick	13,210	25–22–1	51
49	January 24	Boston Bruins	0–2	Los Angeles Kings		Quick	18,118	26–22–1	53
50	January 26	San Jose Sharks	2–3	Los Angeles Kings	SO	Quick	18,118	27–22–1	55

February: 8–2–3 (Home: 2–1–0; Road: 6–1–3)
#	Date	Visitor	Score	Home	OT	Decision	Attendance	Record	Pts	Recap
51	February 1	Los Angeles Kings	0–1	Minnesota Wild	SO	Bernier	17,504	27–22–2	56
52	February 2	Los Angeles Kings	3–1	Edmonton Oilers		Quick	16,839	28–22–2	58
53	February 5	Los Angeles Kings	4–3	Calgary Flames	SO	Quick	19,289	29–22–2	60
54	February 10	Los Angeles Kings	1–2	Pittsburgh Penguins	OT	Quick	18,208	29–22–3	61
55	February 12	Los Angeles Kings	4–1	Washington Capitals		Bernier	18,398	30–22–3	63
56	February 13	Los Angeles Kings	1–0	Philadelphia Flyers		Quick	19,724	31–22–3	65
57	February 16	Los Angeles Kings	4–3	Columbus Blue Jackets	SO	Quick	12,442	32–22–3	67
58	February 17	Los Angeles Kings	3–4	New York Rangers	SO	Bernier	18,200	32–22–4	68
59	February 19	Los Angeles Kings	0–3	New York Islanders		Quick	13,119	32–23–4	68
60	February 23	Los Angeles Kings	3–2	Anaheim Ducks		Quick	17,174	33–23–4	70
61	February 24	Minnesota Wild	2–4	Los Angeles Kings		Bernier	18,118	34–23–4	72
62	February 26	Colorado Avalanche	3–4	Los Angeles Kings		Quick	18,118	35–23–4	74
63	February 28	Detroit Red Wings	7–4	Los Angeles Kings		Quick	18,118	35–24–4	74

March: 9–3–2 (Home: 4–2–2; Road: 5–1–0)
#	Date	Visitor	Score	Home	OT	Decision	Attendance	Record	Pts	Recap
64	March 3	Phoenix Coyotes	0–1	Los Angeles Kings		Bernier	18,118	36–24–4	76
65	March 5	Vancouver Canucks	3–1	Los Angeles Kings		Quick	18,118	36–25–4	76
66	March 7	Dallas Stars	4–3	Los Angeles Kings	OT	Bernier	18,118	36–25–5	77
67	March 9	Los Angeles Kings	2–1	Detroit Red Wings		Quick	20,066	37–25–5	79
68	March 11	Los Angeles Kings	4–2	Columbus Blue Jackets		Bernier	15,605	38–25–5	81
69	March 13	Los Angeles Kings	3–2	Dallas Stars		Quick	15,627	39–25–5	83
70	March 15	Los Angeles Kings	4–2	Nashville Predators		Bernier	15,761	40–25–5	85
71	March 17	St. Louis Blues	4–0	Los Angeles Kings		Quick	18,118	40–26–5	85
72	March 19	Anaheim Ducks	2–1	Los Angeles Kings	OT	Quick	18,118	40–26–6	86
73	March 21	Calgary Flames	1–2	Los Angeles Kings	SO	Quick	18,118	41–26–6	88
74	March 24	San Jose Sharks	3–4	Los Angeles Kings	SO	Quick	18,118	42–26–6	90
75	March 26	Colorado Avalanche	1–4	Los Angeles Kings		Quick	18,118	43–26–6	92
76	March 29	Los Angeles Kings	2–0	Edmonton Oilers		Bernier	16,839	44–26–6	94
77	March 31	Los Angeles Kings	1–3	Vancouver Canucks		Quick	18,860	44–27–6	94

April: 2–3–0 (Home: 2–1–0; Road: 0–2–0)
#	Date	Visitor	Score	Home	OT	Decision	Attendance	Record	Pts	Recap
78	April 2	Dallas Stars	1–3	Los Angeles Kings		Quick	18,118	45–27–6	96
79	April 4	Los Angeles Kings	1–6	San Jose Sharks		Quick	17,562	45–28–6	96
80	April 6	Phoenix Coyotes	2–3	Los Angeles Kings	SO	Quick	18,118	46–28–6	98
81	April 8	Los Angeles Kings	1–2	Anaheim Ducks		Quick	17,587	46–29–6	98
82	April 9	Anaheim Ducks	3–1	Los Angeles Kings		Quick	18,203	46–30–6	98

Legend: Win (2 points) Loss (0 points) Overtime/shootout loss (1 point)

== Playoffs ==
The Kings returned to the playoffs for the second consecutive season.

2011 Stanley Cup Playoffs

Western Conference Quarter-finals: vs. (2) San Jose Sharks – San Jose Sharks win series 4–2
#	Date	Visitor	Score	Home	OT	Decision	Attendance	Series	Recap
1	April 14	Los Angeles Kings	2–3	San Jose Sharks	OT	Quick (0–1)	17,562	Sharks lead 1–0
2	April 16	Los Angeles Kings	4–0	San Jose Sharks		Quick (1–1)	17,562	Series tied 1–1
3	April 19	San Jose Sharks	6–5	Los Angeles Kings	OT	Quick (1–2)	18,216	Sharks lead 2–1
4	April 21	San Jose Sharks	6–3	Los Angeles Kings		Quick (1–3)	18,234	Sharks lead 3–1
5	April 23	Los Angeles Kings	3–1	San Jose Sharks		Quick (2–3)	17,562	Sharks lead 3–2
6	April 25	San Jose Sharks	4–3	Los Angeles Kings	OT	Quick (2–4)	18,118	Sharks win 4–2

Legend: Win Loss

== Player statistics ==
=== Skaters ===
Regular season

Player	GP	G	A	Pts	+/−	PIM
Anze Kopitar	75	25	48	73	25	20
Dustin Brown	82	28	29	57	17	67
Justin Williams	73	22	35	57	14	59
Ryan Smyth	82	23	24	47	−1	35
Jarret Stoll	82	20	23	43	−6	42
Jack Johnson	82	5	37	42	−21	44
Drew Doughty	76	11	29	40	13	68
Wayne Simmonds	80	14	16	30	−2	75
Michal Handzus	82	12	18	30	−5	20
Brad Richardson	68	7	12	19	−13	47
Alec Martinez	60	5	11	16	11	18
Rob Scuderi	82	2	13	15	1	16
Alexei Ponikarovsky	61	5	10	15	1	36
Kyle Clifford	76	7	7	14	−10	141
Trevor Lewis	72	3	10	13	−11	6
Matt Greene	71	2	9	11	3	70
Willie Mitchell	57	5	5	10	4	21
Marco Sturm^{‡}	17	4	5	9	6	17
Andrei Loktionov	19	4	3	7	2	2
Dustin Penner^{†}	19	2	4	6	0	2
Davis Drewiske	38	0	5	5	−1	19
Peter Harrold	19	1	3	4	3	4
Oscar Moller	13	1	3	4	−1	2
Scott Parse	5	1	3	4	5	0
Kevin Westgarth	56	0	3	3	−6	105
Brayden Schenn	8	0	2	2	−1	0
Jake Muzzin	11	0	1	1	−2	0
John Zeiler	4	0	0	0	−1	0
Dwight King	6	0	0	0	−2	2

Playoffs

Player	GP	G	A	Pts	+/−	PIM
Ryan Smyth	6	2	3	5	3	0
Brad Richardson	6	2	3	5	−4	2
Jack Johnson	6	1	4	5	−2	0
Kyle Clifford	6	3	2	5	−2	7
Justin Williams	6	3	1	4	0	2
Trevor Lewis	6	1	3	4	0	2
Drew Doughty	6	2	2	4	0	8
Jarret Stoll	5	0	3	3	4	0
Wayne Simmonds	6	1	2	3	−1	20
Michal Handzus	6	1	1	2	−4	0
Willie Mitchell	6	1	1	2	1	4
Rob Scuderi	6	0	2	2	−1	0
Dustin Brown	6	1	1	2	−3	6
Dustin Penner	6	1	1	2	−3	4
Kevin Westgarth	6	0	2	2	2	14
Alexei Ponikarovsky	4	1	0	1	1	0
Alec Martinez	6	0	1	1	−1	2
Matt Greene	6	0	0	0	−3	14
Scott Parse	2	0	0	0	−1	0
Oscar Moller	1	0	0	0	1	0

=== Goaltenders ===
Note: Pos = Position;GP = Games played; Min, TOI = Minutes played; W = Wins; L = Losses; T,T/OT = Ties; OTL = Overtime losses; GA = Goals-against; GAA = Goals-against average; SO = Shutouts; SA = Shots against; SV = Shots saved; SV% = Save percentage;

Regular season

Player	GP	Min	W	L	OT	GA	GAA	SA	Sv%	SO
Jonathan Quick	61	3591	35	22	3	134	2.24	1631	.918	6
Jonathan Bernier	25	1378	11	8	3	57	2.48	652	.913	3

Playoffs

Player	GP	Min	W	L	GA	GAA	SA	Sv%	SO
Jonathan Quick	6	380	2	4	20	3.16	229	.913	1

^{†}Denotes player spent time with another team before joining Kings. Stats reflect time with the Kings only.
^{‡}Traded mid-season.
Bold/italics denotes franchise record.
Underline denotes currently with a minor league affiliate.

== Awards and records ==
=== Records ===
Anze Kopitar established a franchise record for most consecutive games played. On March 14, 2011, Kopitar established the new mark by playing in a 325th consecutive game against the Nashville Predators. The previous record was held by Hockey Hall of Fame member Marcel Dionne. Dionne played in 324 straight contests between January 7, 1978, until January 9, 1982. Jonathan Quick became the first goaltender in franchise history to post consecutive 30-win seasons.

=== Milestones ===
Regular season
Player	Milestone	Reached
Kyle Clifford	1st career NHL game	October 9, 2010
Jake Muzzin	1st career NHL game	October 9, 2010
Jake Muzzin	1st career NHL assist 1st career NHL point	October 15, 2010
Andrei Loktionov	1st career NHL goal 1st career NHL point	October 20, 2010
Brayden Schenn	1st career NHL assist 1st career NHL point	October 21, 2010
Andrei Loktionov	1st career NHL assist	October 23, 2010
Alexei Ponikarovsky	500th career NHL game	October 23, 2010
Ryan Smyth	1,000th career NHL game	November 6, 2010
Anze Kopitar	300th career NHL point	November 13, 2010
Dwight King	1st career NHL game	November 17, 2010
Jarret Stoll	100th career NHL goal	November 20, 2010
Kevin Westgarth	1st career NHL assist 1st career NHL point	November 20, 2010
Alec Martinez	1st career NHL goal 1st career NHL point	November 24, 2010
Kyle Clifford	1st career NHL assist 1st career NHL point	December 2, 2010
Alec Martinez	1st career NHL assist	December 4, 2010
Kyle Clifford	1st career NHL goal	December 9, 2010
Rob Scuderi	400th career NHL game	December 11, 2010
Willie Mitchell	600th career NHL game	December 13, 2010
Drew Doughty	100th career NHL point	December 21, 2010
Michal Handzus	800th career NHL game	January 1, 2011
Anze Kopitar	200th career NHL assist	January 6, 2011
Wayne Simmonds	200th career NHL game	January 6, 2011
Drew Doughty	200th career NHL game	January 13, 2011
Justin Williams	600th career NHL game	January 22, 2011
Ryan Smyth	400th career NHL assist	February 26, 2011
Brad Richardson	300th career NHL game	February 26, 2011
Justin Williams	400th career NHL point	March 7, 2011
Jarret Stoll	500th career NHL game	March 9, 2011
Dustin Brown	500th career NHL game	March 13, 2011
Dustin Brown	300th career NHL point	March 26, 2011
Jack Johnson	100th career NHL point	April 9, 2011

Playoffs
Player	Milestone	Reached
Kyle Clifford	1st career NHL playoff game	April 14, 2011
Trevor Lewis	1st career NHL playoff game	April 14, 2011
Alec Martinez	1st career NHL playoff game	April 14, 2011
Kevin Westgarth	1st career NHL playoff game	April 14, 2011
Kyle Clifford	1st career NHL playoff goal 1st career NHL playoff assist 1st career NHL playoff point	April 16, 2011
Jack Johnson	1st career NHL playoff goal	April 16, 2011
Oscar Moller	1st career NHL playoff game	April 16, 2011
Jonathan Quick	1st career NHL playoff shutout	April 16, 2011
Trevor Lewis	1st career NHL playoff assist 1st career NHL playoff point	April 19, 2011
Kevin Westgarth	1st career NHL playoff assist 1st career NHL playoff point	April 19, 2011
Trevor Lewis	1st career NHL playoff goal	April 25, 2011
Alec Martinez	1st career NHL playoff assist 1st career NHL playoff point	April 25, 2011

=== Awards ===
Regular season
Player	Award	Awarded
Jonathan Quick	NHL Second Star of the Week	January 31, 2011

== Transactions ==
The Kings have been involved in the following transactions during the 2010–11 season.

=== Trades ===
Date	Details
June 25, 2010	To Florida Panthers 1st-round pick (19th overall) in 2010 – Nick Bjugstad; 2nd-round pick in 2010 (Note: Pick later traded to Minnesota Wild.) – Jason Zucker	To Los Angeles Kings 1st-round pick (15th overall) in 2010 – Derek Forbort
June 26, 2010	To Colorado Avalanche 2nd-round pick (49th overall) in 2010 – Calvin Pickard; 4th-round pick in 2010 (Note: Pick later traded to Dallas Stars.) – Alex Theriau	To Los Angeles Kings 2nd-round pick (47th overall) in 2010 – Tyler Toffoli
June 26, 2010	To Toronto Maple Leafs 3rd-round pick in 2010 – Sondre Olden	To Los Angeles Kings 3rd-round pick in 2012 (Note: Pick later traded to Nashville Predators.) – Jimmy Vesey
June 26, 2010	To Atlanta Thrashers 6th-round pick (169th overall) in 2010 – Sebastian Owuya; 7th-round pick in 2010 – Peter Stoykewych	To Los Angeles Kings 6th-round pick (158th overall) in 2010 – Maxim Kitsyn
December 11, 2010	To Boston Bruins Future considerations	To Los Angeles Kings Marco Sturm
February 28, 2011	To Edmonton Oilers Colten Teubert; 1st-round pick in 2011 – Oscar Klefbom; Conditional 3rd-round pick in 2012 – Daniil Zharkov	To Los Angeles Kings Dustin Penner

=== Free agents acquired ===
Player	Former team	Contract terms
Alexei Ponikarovsky	Pittsburgh Penguins	1 year, $3.2 million
Willie Mitchell	Vancouver Canucks	2 years, $7 million

=== Free agents lost ===
Player	New team	Contract terms
Sean O'Donnell	Philadelphia Flyers	1 year, $1 million
Raitis Ivanans	Calgary Flames	2 years, $1.2 million
Alexander Frolov	New York Rangers	1 year, $3 million
Randy Jones	Tampa Bay Lightning	1 year, $1 million
Fredrik Modin	Atlanta Thrashers	1 year, $800,000
Jeff Halpern	Montreal Canadiens	1 year, $600,000

=== Acquired via waivers ===
Player	Former team	Date claimed off waivers

=== Lost via waivers ===
Player	New team	Date claimed off waivers
Marco Sturm	Washington Capitals	February 26, 2011

=== Player signings ===
Player	Contract terms
Johan Fransson	1 year, $690,000 entry-level contract
Brad Richardson	1 year, $900,000
Richard Clune	1 year, $522,500
Trevor Lewis	1 year, $803,250
Corey Elkins	1 year, $726,000
Marc-Andre Cliche	1 year, $660,000
David Kolomatis	3 years, $1.615 million entry-level contract
Jonathan Bernier	2 years, $2.5 million contract extension
Jordan Nolan	3 years, $1.595 million entry-level contract
Jack Johnson	7 years, $30.5 million contract extension
Justin Williams	4 years, $14.6 million contract extension
Tyler Toffoli	3 years, $2.24 million entry-level contract
Jordan Weal	3 years, $1.92 million entry-level contract

== Draft picks ==
Los Angeles' picks at the 2010 NHL entry draft in Los Angeles, California.

Round	#	Player	Position	Nationality	College/junior/club team (league)
1	15 (from Boston via Florida)	Derek Forbort	D	United States	U.S. National Team Development Program (USHL)
2	47 (from Colorado)	Tyler Toffoli	RW	Canada	Ottawa 67's (OHL)
3	70 (from NY Rangers)	Jordan Weal	C	Canada	Regina Pats (WHL)
5	148 (from San Jose)	Kevin Gravel	D	United States	Sioux City Musketeers (USHL)
6	158 (from Atlanta)	Maxim Kitsyn	LW	Russia	Metallurg Novokuznetsk (KHL)

== Farm teams ==
The Kings have one American Hockey League (AHL) affiliate in the Manchester Monarchs. They also have one ECHL affiliate in the Ontario Reign. Both the Monarchs and the Reign are owned in part by the Kings' parent company, Anschutz Entertainment Group.
