= 2010–11 Dallas Stars season =

National Hockey League team season

2010–11 Dallas Stars
- Division: 5th Pacific
- Conference: 9th Western
- 2010–11 record: 42–29–11
- Home record: 22–11–8
- Road record: 20–18–3
- Goals for: 227
- Goals against: 233

Team information
- General manager: Joe Nieuwendyk
- Coach: Marc Crawford
- Captain: Brendan Morrow
- Alternate captains: Steve Ott; Brad Richards; Stephane Robidas
- Arena: American Airlines Center

Team leaders
- Goals: Brenden Morrow (33)
- Assists: Mike Ribeiro (52)
- Points: Brad Richards (77)
- Penalty minutes: Steve Ott (183)
- Plus/minus: Loui Eriksson(+10)
- Wins: Kari Lehtonen (34)
- Goals against average: Kari Lehtonen 2.55

The 2010–11 Dallas Stars season was the 44th season for the National Hockey League (NHL) franchise that was established on June 5, 1967, and 18th season since the franchise relocated to Dallas to start the 1993–94 NHL season. Despite having a winning record, the Stars failed to qualify for the Stanley Cup playoffs for the third consecutive season. The Stars posted a regular season record of 42 wins, 29 losses and 11 overtime/shootout losses for 95 points, only two points behind the defending Stanley Cup champion Chicago Blackhawks for the last playoff spot. The Stars had a strong start to the season, compiling a 30–15–5 record before the All-Star break. After the break, however, the team started to struggle going 12–14–6 through the rest of the season and going on numerous losing streaks which included one-goal losses and blowing late leads in numerous games they had little business losing. Despite these late season difficulties, the Stars still remained in the playoff hunt for the rest of the way. On April 10, 2011, the last day of the season, the Stars had an opportunity to leap past the Blackhawks to the last playoff spot and match up against the Presidents' Trophy-winning Vancouver Canucks in the opening round by winning their last game in regulation or in overtime against the Minnesota Wild after the Blackhawks were unable to gain a point in the standings (losing their last game 4–3 in regulation against the Detroit Red Wings). The Stars, however, would go on to lose their last game against the Wild 5–3, resulting in their near miss from the playoffs. The 95 points recorded in the standings tied the 2006–07 Colorado Avalanche for the team with the highest point total in a season that failed to make the playoffs. This record was later surpassed by the 2014–15 Boston Bruins, 2017–18 Florida Panthers and 2018–19 Montreal Canadiens and 2024–25 Calgary Flames, each of whom failed to make the playoffs with 96 points.

== Off-season ==
The Stars decided to not re-sign unrestricted free agent goalie Marty Turco. The Stars signed free agent goalie Andrew Raycroft, formerly of the Vancouver Canucks, as a likely backup goaltender to Kari Lehtonen. Mike Modano left the team to sign with the Detroit Red Wings.

== Regular season ==
On February 21, 2011, among an extended skid, general manager Joe Nieuwendyk traded defenseman Matt Niskanen and forward James Neal to the Pittsburgh Penguins in exchange for defenseman Alex Goligoski. After failing to make the playoffs by losing their final game of the season, Marc Crawford was fired as head coach.

== Playoffs ==
The Stars narrowly failed to qualify for the 2011 Stanley Cup playoffs.

== Schedule and results ==
=== Pre-season ===
2010 Pre-season
#	Date	Visitor	Score	Home	OT	Decision	Record	Recap
1	September 21	Tampa Bay Lightning	4 - 2	Dallas Stars		Dan Ellis	0-1-0	Recap
2	September 24	Colorado Avalanche	1 - 2	Dallas Stars		Kari Lehtonen	1-1-0	Recap
3	September 25	St. Louis Blues	2 - 5	Dallas Stars		Brent Krahn	2-1-0	Recap
4	September 28	Dallas Stars	1 - 2	Colorado Avalanche		Peter Budaj	2-2-0	Recap
5	September 30	Colorado Avalanche	1 - 2	Dallas Stars		Kari Lehtonen	3-2-0	Recap
6	October 2	Dallas Stars	3 - 4	St. Louis Blues	OT	Jaroslav Halak	3-2-1	Recap

=== Regular season ===
2010–11 Game Log

October: 6–4–0 (Home: 3–3–0; Road: 3–1–0)
#	Date	Visitor	Score	Home	OT	Decision	Attendance	Record	Pts	Recap
1	October 8	Dallas Stars	4-3	New Jersey Devils	OT	Lehtonen 1-0-0	17,625	1-0-0	2	Recap
2	October 9	Dallas Stars	5-4	New York Islanders	SO	Lehtonen 2-0-0	13,351	2-0-0	4	Recap
3	October 14	Detroit Red Wings	1-4	Dallas Stars		Lehtonen 3-0-0	18,532	3-0-0	6	Recap
4	October 16	St. Louis Blues	2-3	Dallas Stars	SO	Lehtonen 4-0-0	11,750	4-0-0	8	Recap
5	October 18	Dallas Stars	4-5	Tampa Bay Lightning		Lehtonen 4-1-0	13,277	4-1-0	8	Recap
6	October 21	Dallas Stars	4-1	Florida Panthers		Lehtonen 5-1-0	11,580	5-1-0	10	Recap
7	October 23	Nashville Predators	1-0	Dallas Stars		Lehtonen 5-2-0	13,583	5-2-0	10	Recap
8	October 26	Anaheim Ducks	5-2	Dallas Stars		Lehtonen 5-3-0	12,378	5-3-0	10	Recap
9	October 28	Los Angeles Kings	5-2	Dallas Stars		Lehtonen 5-4-0	11,306	5-4-0	10	Recap
10	October 30	Buffalo Sabres	0-4	Dallas Stars		Raycroft 1-0-0	15,015	6-4-0	12	Recap

November: 8–4–1 (Home: 5–0–1; Road: 3-4–0)
#	Date	Visitor	Score	Home	OT	Decision	Attendance	Record	Pts	Recap
11	November 3	Pittsburgh Penguins	2-5	Dallas Stars		Lehtonen 6-4-0	15,637	7-4-0	14	Recap
12	November 5	Phoenix Coyotes	3-6	Dallas Stars		Lehtonen 7-4-0	12,255	8-4-0	16	Recap
13	November 6	Dallas Stars	0-5	Colorado Avalanche		Raycroft 1-1-0	16,172	8-5-0	16	Recap
14	November 11	Dallas Stars	1-3	Los Angeles Kings		Lehtonen 7-5-0	18,118	8-6-0	16	Recap
15	November 12	Dallas Stars	2-4	Anaheim Ducks		Lehtonen 7-6-0	13,831	8-7-0	16	Recap
16	November 16	Anaheim Ducks	1-2	Dallas Stars		Lehtonen 8-6-0	13,433	9-7-0	18	Recap
17	November 18	San Jose Sharks	4-5	Dallas Stars	OT	Lehtonen 9-6-0	14,720	10-7-0	20	Recap
18	November 20	Colorado Avalanche	4-3	Dallas Stars	SO	Lehtonen 9-6-1	17,441	10-7-1	21	Recap
19	November 22	Dallas Stars	1-4	Toronto Maple Leafs		Lehtonen 9-7-1	19,266	10-8-1	21	Recap
20	November 24	Dallas Stars	2-1	Ottawa Senators		Raycroft 2-1-0	16,281	11-8-1	23	Recap
21	November 26	St. Louis Blues	2-3	Dallas Stars		Lehtonen 10-7-1	16,675	12-8-1	25	Recap
22	November 27	Dallas Stars	2-1	St. Louis Blues		Lehtonen 11-7-1	19,150	13-8-1	27	Recap
23	November 29	Dallas Stars	4-1	Carolina Hurricanes		Lehtonen 12-7-1	15,382	14-8-1	29	Recap

December: 8–5–3 (Home: 4–3–2; Road: 4-2–1)
#	Date	Visitor	Score	Home	OT	Decision	Attendance	Record	Pts	Recap
24	December 2	Washington Capitals	1-2	Dallas Stars		Raycroft 3-1-0	13,943	15-8-1	31	Recap
25	December 4	Minnesota Wild	3-4	Dallas Stars	OT	Lehtonen 13-7-1	14,344	16-8-1	33	Recap
26	December 6	Dallas Stars	2-3	Columbus Blue Jackets	OT	Lehtonen 13-7-2	10,932	16-8-2	34	Recap
27	December 8	Dallas Stars	3-5	Chicago Blackhawks		Raycroft 3-2-0	21,184	16-9-2	34	Recap
28	December 10	Carolina Hurricanes	1-2	Dallas Stars	SO	Raycroft 4-2-0	13,012	17-9-2	36	Recap
29	December 11	Dallas Stars	2-5	Phoenix Coyotes		Raycroft 4-3-0	11,410	17-10-2	36	Recap
30	December 13	Dallas Stars	3-2	San Jose Sharks	SO	Raycroft 5-3-0	17,562	18-10-2	38	Recap
31	December 16	San Jose Sharks	4-3	Dallas Stars	OT	Lehtonen 13-7-3	14,899	18-10-3	39	Recap
32	December 18	Dallas Stars	2-1	Columbus Blue Jackets		Lehtonen 14-7-3	13,973	19-10-3	41	Recap
33	December 19	Dallas Stars	4-3	Detroit Red Wings	OT	Raycroft 6-3-0	20,006	20-10-3	43	Recap
34	December 21	Montreal Canadiens	2-5	Dallas Stars		Lehtonen 15-7-3	17,805	21-10-3	45	Recap
35	December 23	Calgary Flames	3-2	Dallas Stars	SO	Lehtonen 15-7-4	15,520	21-10-4	46	Recap
36	December 26	Phoenix Coyotes	1-0	Dallas Stars		Lehtonen 15-8-4	17,515	21-11-4	46	Recap
37	December 28	Dallas Stars	4-2	Nashville Predators		Raycroft 7-3-0	17,113	22-11-4	48	Recap
38	December 29	Detroit Red Wings	7-3	Dallas Stars		Lehtonen 15-9-4	18,532	22-12-4	48	Recap
39	December 31	Vancouver Canucks	4-1	Dallas Stars		Lehtonen 15-10-4	17,733	22-13-4	48	Recap

January: 8–2–1 (Home: 4–0–1; Road: 4-2-0)
#	Date	Visitor	Score	Home	OT	Decision	Attendance	Record	Pts	Recap
40	January 2	Dallas Stars	4-2	St. Louis Blues		Lehtonen 16-10-4	19,150	23-13-4	50	Recap
41	January 5	Dallas Stars	4-2	Chicago Blackhawks		Lehtonen 17-10-4	21,245	24-13-4	52	Recap
42	January 7	New York Rangers	3-2	Dallas Stars	SO	Lehtonen 17-10-5	14,934	24-13-5	53	Recap
43	January 9	Dallas Stars	4-0	Minnesota Wild		Raycroft 8-3-0	18,082	25-13-5	55	Recap
44	January 11	Edmonton Oilers	2-3	Dallas Stars		Lehtonen 18-10-5	12,463	26-13-5	57	Recap
45	January 15	Atlanta Thrashers	1-6	Dallas Stars		Lehtonen 19-10-5	17,702	27-13-5	59	Recap
46	January 17	Los Angeles Kings	1-2	Dallas Stars		Lehtonen 20-10-5	14,163	28-13-5	61	Recap
47	January 20	Dallas Stars	4-2	Edmonton Oilers		Lehtonen 21-10-5	16,839	29-13-5	63	Recap
48	January 21	Dallas Stars	4-7	Calgary Flames		Raycroft 8-4-0	19,289	29-14-5	63	Recap
49	January 24	Dallas Stars	1-7	Vancouver Canucks		Lehtonen 21-11-5	18,860	29-15-5	63	Recap
50	January 26	Edmonton Oilers	1-3	Dallas Stars		Lehtonen 22-11-5	13,875	30-15-5	65	Recap

February: 3–8–1 (Home: 2–3–1; Road: 1-5-0)
#	Date	Visitor	Score	Home	OT	Decision	Attendance	Record	Pts	Recap
51	February 1	Vancouver Canucks	4-1	Dallas Stars		Lehtonen 22-12-5	12,884	30-16-5	65	Recap
52	February 3	Dallas Stars	3-6	Boston Bruins		Lehtonen 22-13-5	17,565	30-17-5	65	Recap
53	February 5	Dallas Stars	1-3	Philadelphia Flyers		Lehtonen 22-14-5	19,881	30-18-5	65	Recap
54	February 9	Phoenix Coyotes	3-2	Dallas Stars	OT	Lehtonen 22-14-6	11,488	30-18-6	66	Recap
55	February 11	Chicago Blackhawks	3-4	Dallas Stars	SO	Lehtonen 23-14-6	17,569	31-18-6	68	Recap
56	February 13	Columbus Blue Jackets	1-2	Dallas Stars		Lehtonen 23-15-6	16,377	31-19-6	68	Recap
57	February 15	Dallas Stars	1-4	Edmonton Oilers		Lehtonen 23-16-6	16,839	31-20-6	68	Recap
58	February 16	Dallas Stars	2-4	Calgary Flames		Lehtonen 23-17-6	19,289	31-21-6	68	Recap
59	February 19	Dallas Stars	2-5	Vancouver Canucks		Raycroft 8-5-0	18,860	31-22-6	68	Recap
60	February 22	New Jersey Devils	1-0	Dallas Stars		Lehtonen 23-18-6	13,652	31-23-6	68	Recap
61	February 24	Dallas Stars	4-1	Detroit Red Wings		Lehtonen 24-18-6	20,066	32-23-6	70	Recap
62	February 26	Nashville Predators	2-3	Dallas Stars		Lehtonen 25-18-6	15,860	33-23-6	72	Recap

March: 5–4–5 (Home: 2–2–3; Road: 3-2-2)
#	Date	Visitor	Score	Home	OT	Decision	Attendance	Record	Pts	Recap
63	March 1	Dallas Stars	3-2	Phoenix Coyotes		Lehtonen 26-18-6	15,751	34-23-6	74	Recap
64	March 4	Dallas Stars	3-4	Anaheim Ducks	OT	Lehtonen 26-18-7	12,883	34-23-7	75	Recap
65	March 5	Dallas Stars	3-2	San Jose Sharks		Lehtonen 27-18-7	17,562	35-23-7	77	Recap
66	March 7	Dallas Stars	4-3	Los Angeles Kings	OT	Lehtonen 28-18-7	18,118	36-23-7	79	Recap
67	March 9	Calgary Flames	3-4	Dallas Stars	SO	Lehtonen 28-18-8	14,476	36-23-8	80	Recap
68	March 11	Minnesota Wild	4-0	Dallas Stars		Lehtonen 29-18-8	14,545	37-23-8	82	Recap
69	March 13	Los Angeles Kings	2-3	Dallas Stars		Lehtonen 29-19-8	15,627	37-24-8	82	Recap
70	March 15	San Jose Sharks	3-6	Dallas Stars		Lehtonen 29-20-8	16,724	37-25-8	82	Recap
71	March 17	Chicago Blackhawks	5-0	Dallas Stars		Lehtonen 30-20-8	14,830	38-25-8	84	Recap
72	March 19	Philadelphia Flyers	2-3	Dallas Stars	SO	Lehtonen 30-20-9	17,652	38-25-9	85	Recap
73	March 23	Anaheim Ducks	3-4	Dallas Stars	OT	Lehtonen 30-20-10	16,021	38-25-10	86	Recap
74	March 26	Dallas Stars	2-4	Nashville Predators		Lehtonen 30-21-10	16,892	38-26-10	86	Recap
75	March 29	Dallas Stars	1-2	Phoenix Coyotes	SO	Lehtonen 30-21-11	12,541	38-26-11	87	Recap
76	March 31	Dallas Stars	0-6	San Jose Sharks		Raycroft 8-6-0	17,562	38-27-11	87	Recap

April: 4–2–0 (Home: 2–0–0; Road: 2-2-0)
#	Date	Visitor	Score	Home	OT	Decision	Attendance	Record	Pts	Recap
77	April 2	Dallas Stars	1-3	Los Angeles Kings		Lehtonen 30-22-10	18,118	38-28-11	87	Recap
78	April 3	Dallas Stars	4-3	Anaheim Ducks		Lehtonen 31-22-10	16,424	39-28-11	89	Recap
79	April 5	Columbus Blue Jackets	3-0	Dallas Stars		Lehtonen 32-22-10	16,012	40-28-11	91	Recap
80	April 7	Colorado Avalanche	4-2	Dallas Stars		Lehtonen 33-22-10	15,105	41-28-11	93	Recap
81	April 8	Dallas Stars	3-2	Colorado Avalanche		Lehtonen 34-22-10	14,037	42-28-11	95	Recap
82	April 10	Dallas Stars	3-5	Minnesota Wild		Lehtonen 34-22-11	18,504	42-29-11	95	Recap

Legend: Win (2 points) Loss (0 points) Overtime/shootout loss (1 point)

== Standings ==
=== Divisional standings ===
Pacific Division
		GP	W	L	OTL	ROW	GF	GA	Pts
**1**	**y-San Jose Sharks**	**82**	**48**	**25**	**9**	**43**	**248**	**213**	**105**
**2**	**Anaheim Ducks**	**82**	**47**	**30**	**5**	**43**	**239**	**235**	**99**
**3**	**Phoenix Coyotes**	**82**	**43**	**26**	**13**	**38**	**231**	**226**	**99**
**4**	**Los Angeles Kings**	**82**	**46**	**30**	**6**	**36**	**219**	**198**	**98**
5	Dallas Stars	82	42	29	11	37	227	233	95

=== Conference standings ===
Western Conference
R		Div	GP	W	L	OTL	ROW	GF	GA	Pts
**1**	**p – Vancouver Canucks**	**NW**	**82**	**54**	**19**	**9**	**50**	**262**	**185**	117
**2**	**y – San Jose Sharks**	**PA**	**82**	**48**	**25**	**9**	**43**	**248**	**213**	105
**3**	**y – Detroit Red Wings**	**CE**	**82**	**47**	**25**	**10**	**43**	**261**	**241**	104
**4**	**Anaheim Ducks**	**PA**	**82**	**47**	**30**	**5**	**43**	**239**	**235**	99
**5**	**Nashville Predators**	**CE**	**82**	**44**	**27**	**11**	**38**	**219**	**194**	99
**6**	**Phoenix Coyotes**	**PA**	**82**	**43**	**26**	**13**	**38**	**231**	**226**	99
**7**	**Los Angeles Kings**	**PA**	**82**	**46**	**30**	**6**	**36**	**219**	**198**	98
**8**	**Chicago Blackhawks**	**CE**	**82**	**44**	**29**	**9**	**38**	**258**	**225**	97
8.5
9	Dallas Stars	PA	82	42	29	11	37	227	233	95
10	Calgary Flames	NW	82	41	29	12	32	250	237	94
11	St. Louis Blues	CE	82	38	33	11	34	240	234	87
12	Minnesota Wild	NW	82	39	35	8	36	206	233	86
13	Columbus Blue Jackets	CE	82	34	35	13	29	215	258	81
14	Colorado Avalanche	NW	82	30	44	8	24	227	288	68
15	Edmonton Oilers	NW	82	25	45	12	23	193	269	62

bold – qualified for playoffs; y – Won division; p – Won President's Trophy (best record in NHL)
CE – Central Division, NW – Northwest Division, PA – Pacific Division

== Player statistics ==
=== Skaters ===
Note: GP = Games played; G = Goals; A = Assists; Pts = Points; +/− = Plus/minus; PIM = Penalty minutes

Regular season

Player	GP	G	A	Pts	+/−	PIM
Brad Richards	72	28	49	77	1	24
Loui Eriksson	79	27	46	73	10	8
Mike Ribeiro	82	19	52	71	-4	28
Brenden Morrow	82	33	23	56	-3	76
Jamie Benn	69	22	34	56	-5	52
James Neal^{‡}	59	21	18	39	8	60
Steve Ott	82	12	20	32	-9	183
Stephane Robidas	81	5	25	30	-7	67
Trevor Daley	82	8	19	27	7	34
Jamie Langenbrunner^{†}	39	5	13	18	-3	29
Alex Goligoski^{†}	23	5	10	15	0	12
Adam Burish	63	8	6	14	2	91
Jeff Woywitka	63	2	9	11	5	24
Brandon Segal	46	5	5	10	0	41
Nicklas Grossmann	59	1	9	10	7	35
Tom Wandell	75	7	2	9	-5	14
Karlis Skrastins	74	3	5	8	-1	38
Toby Petersen	60	2	4	6	-7	8
Matt Niskanen^{‡}	45	0	6	6	-1	30
Jason Williams	27	2	3	5	-2	6
Mark Fistric	57	2	3	5	-10	44
Brian Sutherby	51	2	2	4	-10	58
Krys Barch	44	2	1	3	-7	80
Aaron Gagnon	19	0	2	2	-3	0
Philip Larsen	6	0	2	2	1	0
Tomas Vincour	24	1	1	2	-5	4
Brad Lukowich	5	0	0	0	2	0
Francis Wathier	3	0	0	0	-2	0
Raymond Sawada	1	0	0	0	-1	0
Travis Morin	3	0	0	0	0	0
Colton Sceviour	1	0	0	0	-1	0

=== Goaltenders ===
Note: GP = Games played; TOI = Time on ice (minutes); W = Wins; L = Losses; OT = Overtime losses; GA = Goals against; GAA= Goals against average; SA= Shots against; SV= Saves; Sv% = Save percentage; SO= Shutouts

Regular season

Player	GP	TOI	W	L	OT	GA	GAA	SA	Sv%	SO	G	A	PIM
Kari Lehtonen	69	4119	34	24	11	175	2.55	2043	.914	3	0	6	6
Andrew Raycroft	19	847	8	5	0	40	2.83	446	.910	2	0	0	0
Richard Bachman	1	10	0	0	0	0	0.00	4	1.000	0	0	0	0

^{†}Denotes player spent time with another team before joining Stars. Stats reflect time spent with the Stars only.
^{‡}Traded mid-season
Bold/italics denotes franchise record

== Awards and records ==
=== Awards ===
Regular Season
Player	Award	Awarded

=== Milestones ===
Regular Season
Player	Milestone	Reached
Brendan Morrow	200th Career NHL Goal	October 5, 2010
Toby Petersen	300th Career NHL Game	October 9, 2010
Loui Eriksson	100th Career NHL Assist	October 16, 2010
James Neal	100th Career NHL Point	October 21, 2010
Karlis Skrastins	100th Career NHL Assist	October 21, 2010
Loui Eriksson	300th Career NHL Game	October 26, 2010
Mike Ribeiro	300th Career NHL Assist	November 3, 2010
Loui Eriksson	200th Career NHL Point	November 5, 2010
Mike Ribeiro	600th Career NHL Game	November 22, 2010
Jamie Benn	100th Career NHL Game	November 26, 2010
Aaron Gagnon	1st Career NHL Assist; 1st Career NHL Point	December 6, 2010
Brad Richards	200th Career NHL Goal	December 10, 2010
Jeff Woywitka	200th Career NHL Game	December 10, 2010
Richard Bachman	1st Career NHL Game	December 11, 2010
Adam Burish	200th Career NHL Game	December 16, 2010
Brendan Morrow	700th Career NHL Game	December 19, 2010
Loui Eriksson	100th Career NHL Goal	December 21, 2010
Tom Wandell	100th Career NHL Game	December 31, 2010
James Neal	200th Career NHL Game	January 15, 2011
Jamie Langenbrunner	1,000th Career NHL Game	January 17, 2011
Karlis Skrastins	800th Career NHL Game	January 17, 2011
Travis Morin	1st Career NHL Game	January 26, 2011
Stephane Robidas	200th Career NHL Point	January 26, 2011
Colton Sceviour	1st Career NHL Game	February 5, 2011
Brad Richards	700th Career NHL Point	February 9, 2011
Tomas Vincour	1st Career NHL Game	February 9, 2011
Stephane Robidas	700th Career NHL Game	February 16, 2011
Steve Ott	100th Career NHL Assist	February 24, 2011
Tomas Vincour	1st Career NHL Goal; 1st Career NHL Point	March 9, 2011
Tomas Vincour	1st Career NHL Assist	March 17, 2011
Alex Goligoski	100th Career NHL Point	March 23, 2011
Jamie Langenbrunner	400th Career NHL Assist	March 29, 2011
Alex Goligoski	200th Career NHL Game	April 10, 2011

== Transactions ==
The Stars have been involved in the following transactions during the 2010–11 season.

=== Trades ===
Date	Details
June 26, 2010	To Colorado Avalanche 3rd-round pick (71st overall) in 2010 – Michael Bournival	To Dallas Stars 3rd-round pick (77th overall) in 2010 – Alex Guptill; 4th-round pick in 2010 – Alex Theriau
January 7, 2011	To New Jersey Devils Conditional 3rd-round pick in 2011 – Blake Coleman	To Dallas Stars Jamie Langenbrunner
January 13, 2011	To Toronto Maple Leafs Fabian Brunnstrom	To Dallas Stars Mikhail Stefanovich
February 21, 2011	To Pittsburgh Penguins James Neal; Matt Niskanen	To Dallas Stars Alex Goligoski

=== Free agents acquired ===
Player	Former team	Contract terms
Severin Blindenbacher	Färjestad BK	1 year, $1.1125 million entry-level contract
Jace Coyle	Medicine Hat Tigers	3 years, $1.61 million entry-level contract
Adam Burish	Chicago Blackhawks	2 years, $2.3 million
Andrew Raycroft	Vancouver Canucks	2 years, $1.3 million
Travis Morin	Texas Stars	1 year, $500,000
Brad Lukowich	Vancouver Canucks	1 year, $1 million
Jason Williams	Connecticut Whale	1 year, 500,000

=== Free agents lost ===
Player	New team	Contract terms
Warren Peters	Minnesota Wild	2 years, $1.075 million
Matt Climie	Phoenix Coyotes	1 year, $725,000
Andrew Hutchinson	Pittsburgh Penguins	1 year, $500,000
Marty Turco	Chicago Blackhawks	1 year, $1.3 million
Mike Modano	Detroit Red Wings	1 year, $1.25 million

=== Claimed via waivers ===
Player	Former team	Date claimed off waivers

=== Lost via waivers ===
Player	New team	Date claimed off waivers

=== Lost via retirement ===
Player
Jere Lehtinen

=== Player signings ===
Player	Contract terms
Kari Lehtonen	3 years, $10.65 million contract extension
Brent Krahn	1 year, $500,000
Krys Barch	2 years, $1.675 million
Francis Wathier	2 years, $1.15 million
Aaron Gagnon	1 year, $600,000
Scott Glennie	3 year entry-level contract
Maxime Fortunus	2 years, $1.175 million
Trevor Ludwig	1 year, $525,000
Raymond Sawada	1 year, $575,000
Fabian Brunnstrom	1 year, $675,000
Nicklas Grossmann	2 years, $3.25 million
James Neal	2 years, $5.75 million
Matt Niskanen	2 years, $3 million
Jack Campbell	3 years, $2.4 million entry-level contract
Matt Fraser	3 years, $1.68 million entry-level contract
Trevor Daley	6 years, $19.8 million contract extension
Brenden Dillon	3 years, $2.23 million entry-level contract
Patrik Nemeth	3 years, $2.38 million entry-level contract

== Draft picks ==
The Stars' picks at the 2010 NHL entry draft in Los Angeles, California.

Round	#	Player	Position	Nationality	College/Junior/Club team (League)
1	11	Jack Campbell	G	United States	U.S. National Team Development Program (USHL)
2	41	Patrik Nemeth	D	Sweden	AIK IF J20 (J20 SuperElit)
3	77 (from Colorado)	Alex Guptill	LW	Canada	Orangeville Crushers (CCHL)
4	109 (from Los Angeles via Colorado)	Alex Theriau	D	Canada	Everett Silvertips (WHL)
5	131	John Klingberg	D	Sweden	Frölunda HC Jr. (Swedish Jr.)

== See also ==
- 2010–11 NHL season
