= Nate Guenin =

American ice hockey player

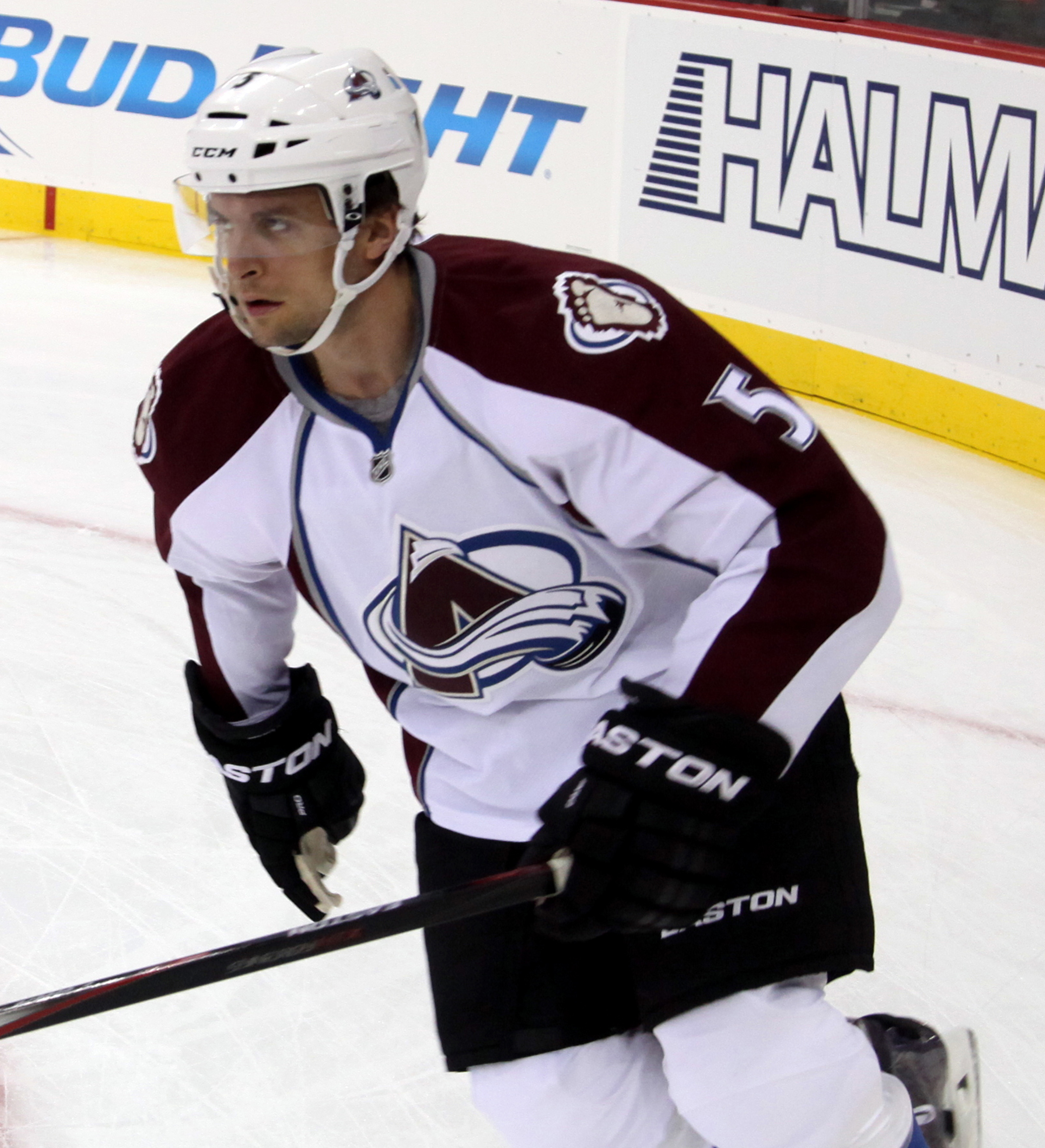
- Guenin with the Colorado Avalanche in 2014
- Born: December 10, 1982 (age 43) Aliquippa, Pennsylvania, U.S.
- Height: 6 ft 2 in (188 cm)
- Weight: 211 lb (96 kg; 15 st 1 lb)
- Position: Defense
- Shot: Right
- Played for: Philadelphia Flyers; Pittsburgh Penguins; Columbus Blue Jackets; Anaheim Ducks; Colorado Avalanche
- NHL draft: 127th overall, 2002; New York Rangers
- Playing career: 2006–2017

Nathaniel Lawrence Guenin (born December 10, 1982) is an American former professional ice hockey defenseman who played in the National Hockey League (NHL).

== Playing career ==
Guenin played high school hockey in the Pittsburgh suburb of Hopewell. He was drafted 127th overall in the 2002 NHL entry draft by the New York Rangers. After completing a four-year collegiate career with the Ohio State Buckeyes, Guenin was signed as a free agent by the Philadelphia Flyers on August 16, 2006. Nate made his professional debut in the 2006–07 season with the Flyers affiliate the Phantoms of the American Hockey League. Later in the season Guenin made his NHL debut with the Flyers. Guenin recorded his first and second assists on March 31, 2007 vs. the New Jersey Devils.

After spending the next two seasons primarily with the Phantoms, Guenin signed with the Pittsburgh Penguins on July 3, 2009. On February 11, 2010, Guenin was traded by the Penguins to the St. Louis Blues for Steven Wagner.

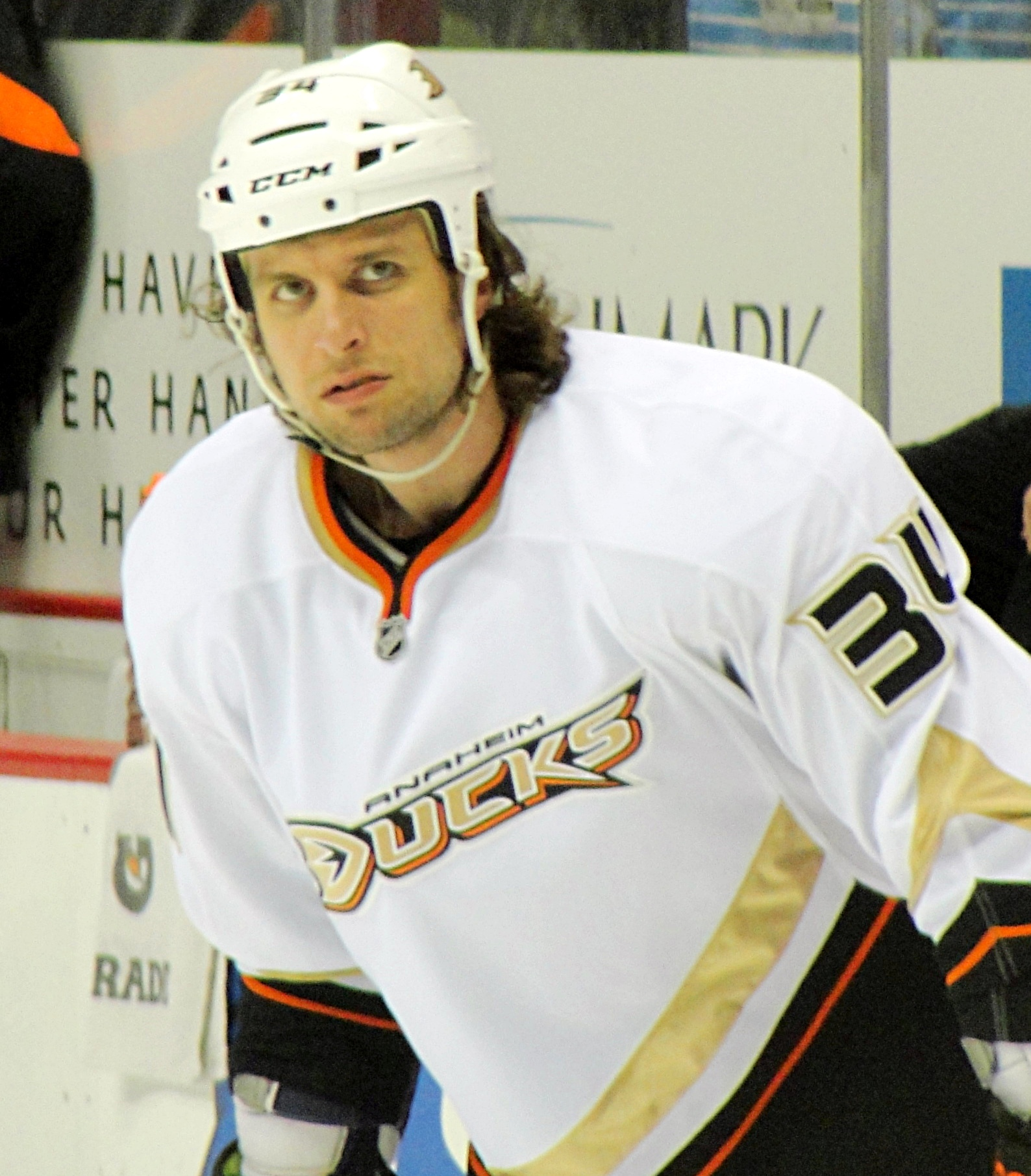
Guenin with the Anaheim Ducks in 2012

On July 2, 2010, Guenin signed a one-year contract with the Columbus Blue Jackets. He was assigned to start the 2010–11 season with AHL affiliate, the Springfield Falcons, but was later recalled and made his Blue Jackets debut in a 3-2 victory over the Minnesota Wild on October 16, 2010. After 3 games with Columbus, Guenin was returned to the Falcons and on January 4, 2011, was traded by the Blue Jackets to the Anaheim Ducks in exchange for Trevor Smith.

Guenin was signed to two-year extension with Anaheim on June 17, 2011. In the following 2011–12 season, Guenin made the Ducks opening night roster. His first NHL goal was scored on October 7, 2011 as a member of the Ducks against Ryan Miller of the Buffalo Sabres. Guenin played in 15 games with the Ducks before he was reassigned to the Syracuse Crunch.

With the NHL lockout in effect, Guenin was directly assigned to captain new Ducks AHL affiliate, the Norfolk Admirals for the 2012–13 season. On January 13, 2013, he was waived by the Anaheim Ducks in preparation of the shortened NHL season before returning to the Admirals. In 66 games, Guenin contributed with 4 goals and 24 points.

On July 5, 2013, Guenin was signed to a one-year, two way contract as a free agent with the Colorado Avalanche. Guenin impressed Avalanche coach Patrick Roy with his performance in the training camp before the season which led to him staying up with the NHL team for the start of the season. After playing the first 9 games with the Avalanche, Roy told Guenin he would be staying in the NHL for the rest of the season. Midway through the season, having held down his position among the Colorado blueline, Guenin was signed to a two-year contract extension on January 7, 2014.

In the 2015–16 season, Guenin struggled to reproduce his previous season form and was healthy scratched after going scoreless in 29 games. He was waived by the Avalanche on January 13, 2016 in order to bring up rookie defenseman Chris Bigras and Nikita Zadorov. Unclaimed, Guenin remained with the Avalanche as a reserve defenseman before he was again placed on waivers and assigned to AHL affiliate, the San Antonio Rampage, on February 18, 2016.

At the conclusion of his contract and tenure with the Avalanche, Guenin signed a one-year, two-way contract to return for a second stint with the Anaheim Ducks on July 2, 2016. He is also a distant relative of Binghamton Bearcats defenseman, Nick Perry.

== Career statistics ==
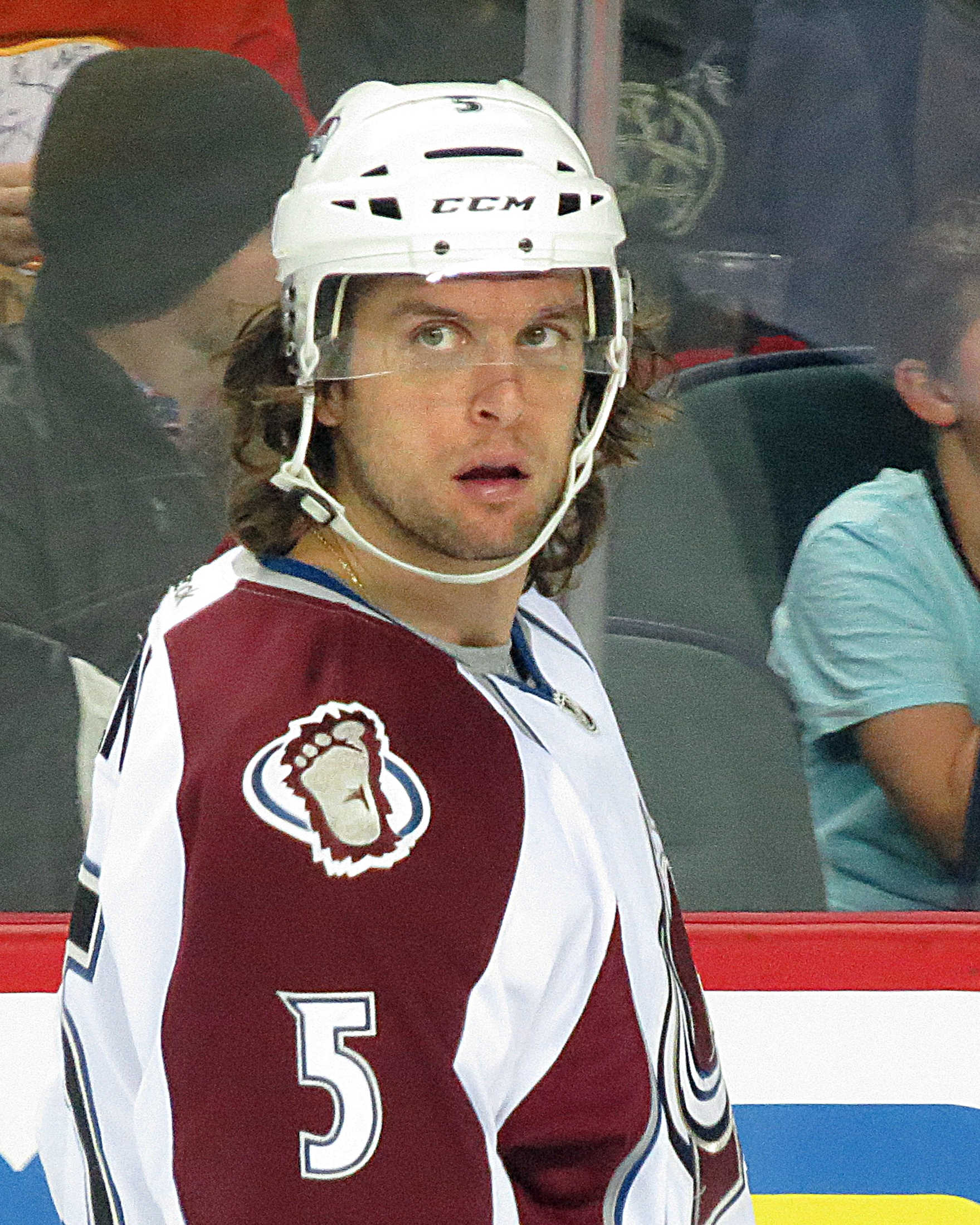
Guenin with the Colorado Avalanche in 2013

			Regular season					Playoffs
Season	Team	League	GP	G	A	Pts	PIM	GP	G	A	Pts	PIM
1999–2000	Pittsburgh Hornets 18U AAA	18U AAA	40	3	10	13	122	—	—	—	—	—
2000–01	Green Bay Gamblers	USHL	54	2	11	13	70	4	1	1	2	6
2001–02	Green Bay Gamblers	USHL	56	4	11	15	150	7	3	3	6	10
2002–03	Ohio State Buckeyes	CCHA	42	2	9	11	75	—	—	—	—	—
2003–04	Ohio State Buckeyes	CCHA	29	2	15	17	92	—	—	—	—	—
2004–05	Ohio State Buckeyes	CCHA	41	2	12	14	136	—	—	—	—	—
2005–06	Ohio State Buckeyes	CCHA	39	0	11	11	87	—	—	—	—	—
2006–07	Philadelphia Phantoms	AHL	68	3	9	12	92	—	—	—	—	—
2006–07	Philadelphia Flyers	NHL	9	0	2	2	4	—	—	—	—	—
2007–08	Philadelphia Phantoms	AHL	77	4	13	17	146	12	0	1	1	18
2007–08	Philadelphia Flyers	NHL	2	0	0	0	2	—	—	—	—	—
2008–09	Philadelphia Phantoms	AHL	62	0	14	14	95	4	0	0	0	10
2008–09	Philadelphia Flyers	NHL	1	0	0	0	0	—	—	—	—	—
2009–10	Wilkes–Barre/Scranton Penguins	AHL	41	3	2	5	63	—	—	—	—	—
2009–10	Pittsburgh Penguins	NHL	2	0	0	0	0	—	—	—	—	—
2009–10	Peoria Rivermen	AHL	27	2	11	13	35	—	—	—	—	—
2010–11	Springfield Falcons	AHL	30	0	5	5	21	—	—	—	—	—
2010–11	Columbus Blue Jackets	NHL	3	0	0	0	2	—	—	—	—	—
2010–11	Syracuse Crunch	AHL	42	2	10	12	44	—	—	—	—	—
2011–12	Anaheim Ducks	NHL	15	2	0	2	6	—	—	—	—	—
2011–12	Syracuse Crunch	AHL	27	0	5	5	16	4	0	0	0	14
2012–13	Norfolk Admirals	AHL	66	4	20	24	38	—	—	—	—	—
2013–14	Colorado Avalanche	NHL	68	1	8	9	46	7	0	1	1	4
2014–15	Colorado Avalanche	NHL	76	2	13	15	32	—	—	—	—	—
2015–16	Colorado Avalanche	NHL	29	0	0	0	2	—	—	—	—	—
2015–16	San Antonio Rampage	AHL	24	2	9	11	14	—	—	—	—	—
2016–17	San Diego Gulls	AHL	56	2	10	12	28	10	1	1	2	0
AHL totals			521	22	108	130	592	30	1	2	3	42
NHL totals			205	5	23	28	94	7	0	1	1	4

== Awards and honors ==
Award	Year
College
CCHA All-Academic Team	2004
All-CCHA Second Team	2005
CCHA Champion	2004
