= List of Djurgårdens IF (men's hockey) players =

This is a list of Djurgårdens IF Hockey players. Fredrik Bremberg has the record of most points during the Elitserien/SHL regular season with 501.

== Goaltenders ==
Statistics are complete to the end of the 2014–15 SHL season.

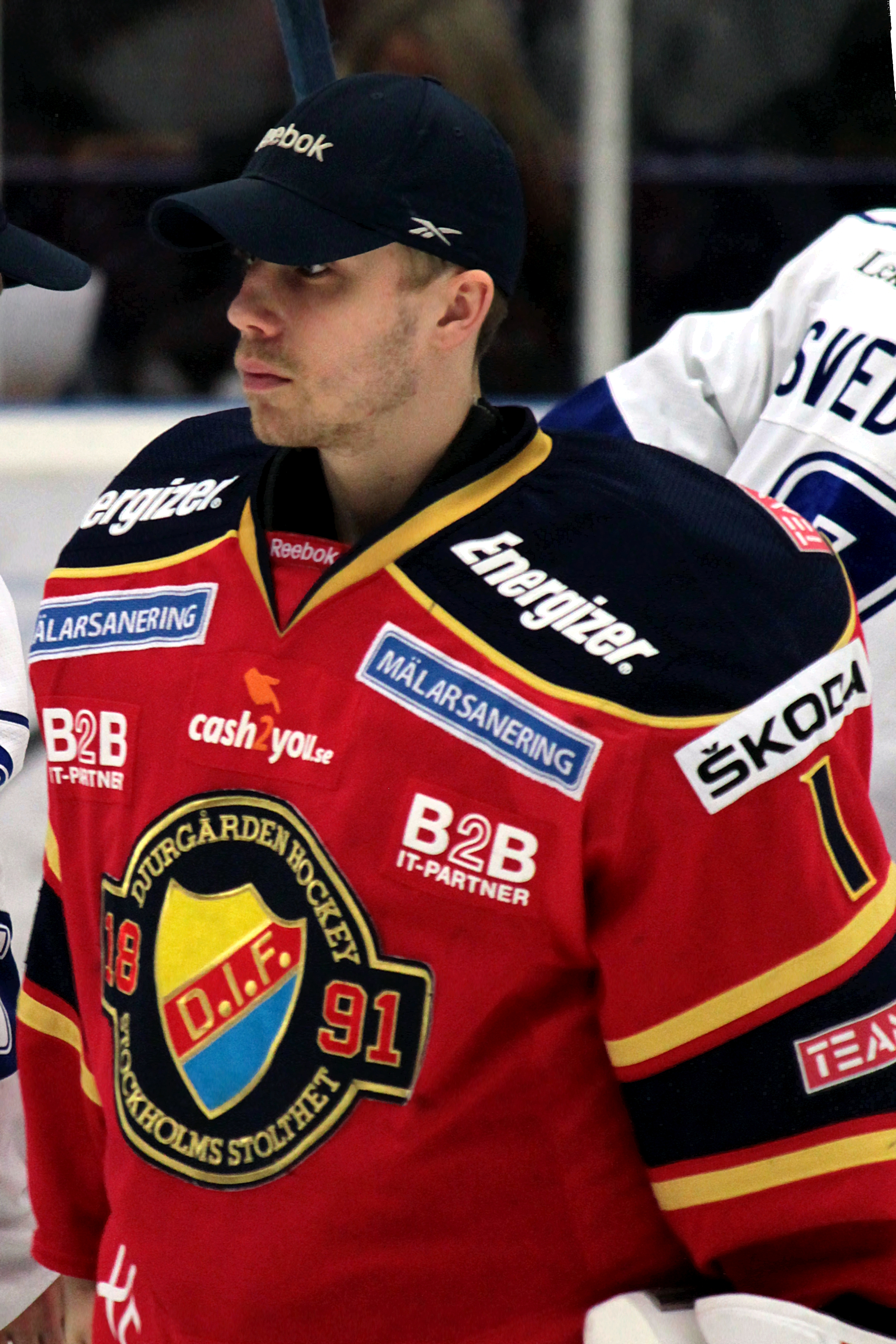
Tim Sandberg played three seasons with Djurgårdens IF.

Name	Nationality	Djurgården career	Regular season								Play-offs							
Name	Nationality	Djurgården career	GP	W	L	T	OTL	SO	GAA	SV%	GP	W	L	T	OTL	SO	GAA	SV%
Mattias Andersson	Sweden	2005–2006	9								–	–	–	–	–	–	–	–
Mantas Armalis	Lithuania	2014–																
Lennart Berglund	Sweden																	
Tommy Björkman	Sweden																	
Björn Bjurling	Sweden	2002–2005	84								2							
Hans-Göran Elo	Sweden	1986–1988	33								3							
Jonas Forsberg	Sweden	1992–1996	2								0							
Joaquin Gage	Canada	2002–2003	42					3	2.56	.903	12					1	2.42	0.914
Andreas Hadelöv	Sweden	1996–1998	21								2							
Patrik Hofbauer	Sweden	1995–1996	8								1							
Martin Holst	Sweden	2000–2001	7								0							
Nils Johansson	Sweden																	
Yngve Johansson	Sweden																	
Fredrik Josefsson	Sweden	1981–1982	4								–	–	–	–	–	–	–	–
Bo Larsson	Sweden	1982–1984	13								2							
Daniel Larsson	Sweden	2006–2008	70								5							
Teemu Lassila	Finland	2005–2007	80								–	–	–	–	–	–	–	–
Johan Mattsson	Sweden	2013–2014	16								0							
Sergejs Naumovs	Latvia	2001–2002	35								5							
Peder Nilsson	Sweden	1975–1981																
Thomas Östlund	Sweden	1992–1996; 2001–2002	151								17							
Mark Owuya	Sweden	2007–2011	33								7							
Joakim Persson	Sweden	1989–1992	3								0							
Chet Pickard	Canada	2012–2013	45								6							
Adam Reideborn	Sweden	2012–2014	49								10							
Rolf Ridderwall	Sweden	1981–1990	263								39							
Stefan Ridderwall	Sweden	2005–2006; 2007–2011	89								2							
Petter Rönnquist	Sweden	1992–1994; 1996–1997; 2003–2004	55								6							
Tim Sandberg	Sweden	2008–2009; 2010–2012	6								0							
Tommy Söderström	Sweden	1986–1992; 1997–2000	197					12		0.892	36					3		0.909
Hans Stergel	Sweden																	
Reino Sundberg	Sweden	1975–1981																
Mikael Tellqvist	Sweden	1996–2001; 2014–	115					8	2.32	.913	29					4		0.905
José Théodore	Canada	2004–2005	17					0	2.46	.916	11						2.23	0.922
Marty Turco	Canada	2004–2005	6					1	2.02	.932	–	–	–	–	–	–	–	–
Rolf Wanhainen	Sweden	1988–1990; 1998–1999; 2004–2005	5								0							
Gustaf Wesslau	Sweden	2008–2010; 2011–2012	119								25							
Christer Wiberg	Sweden	1975–1976																
Mats Ytter	Sweden	1984–1986; 1988–1989	21								0							

== Skaters ==
Statistics are complete to the end of the 2014–15 SHL season.

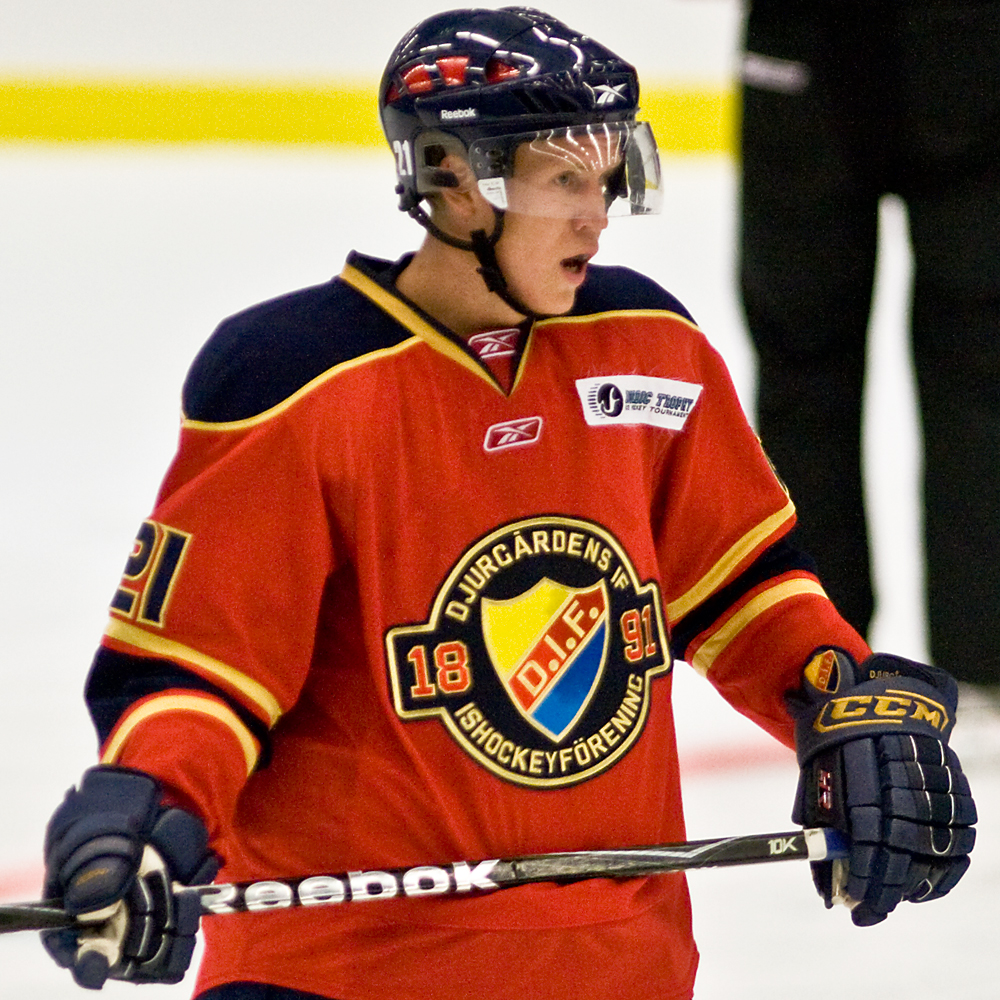
Andreas Engqvist played five seasons with Djurgårdens IF.

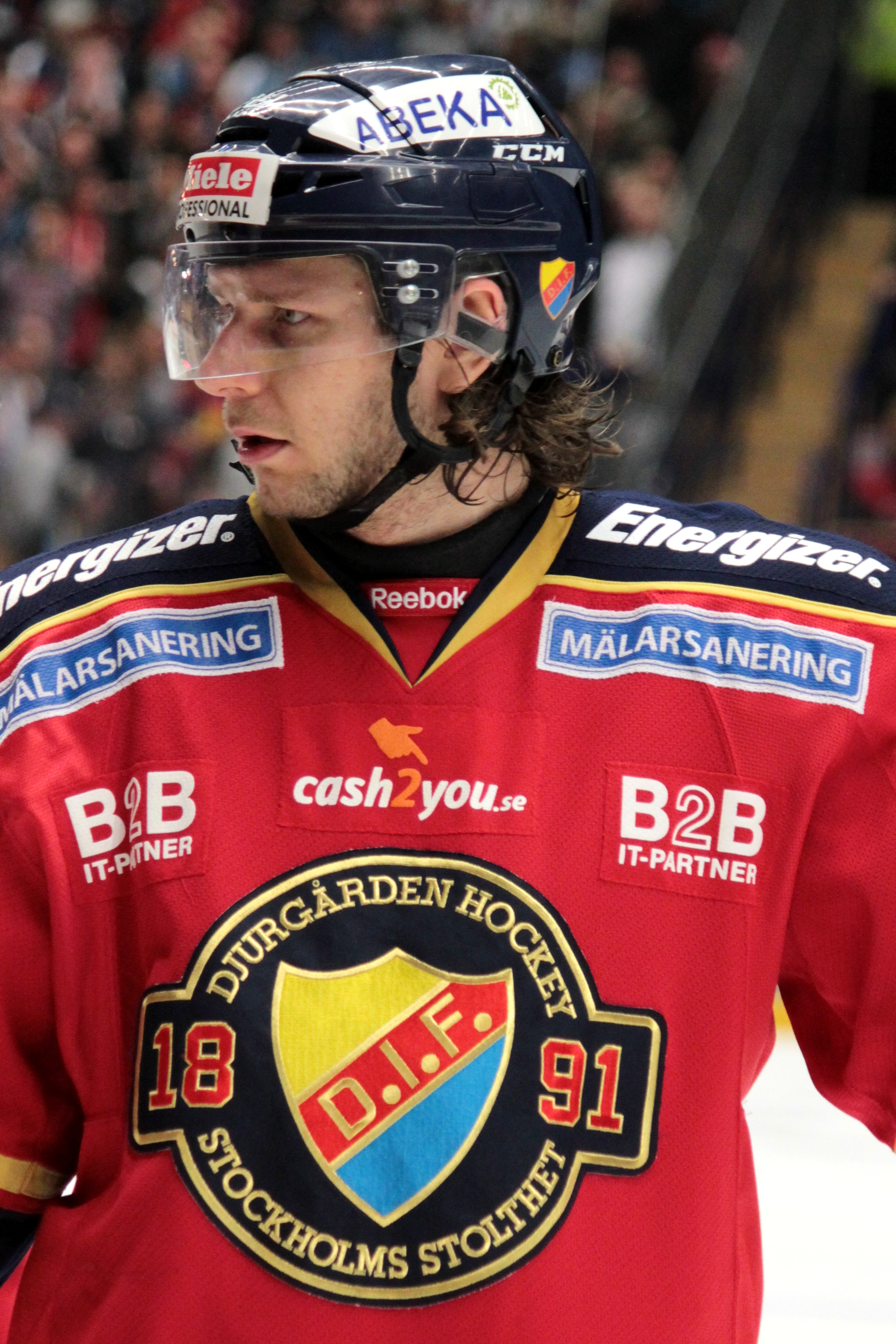
Andreas Holmqvist played four seasons with Djurgårdens IF.

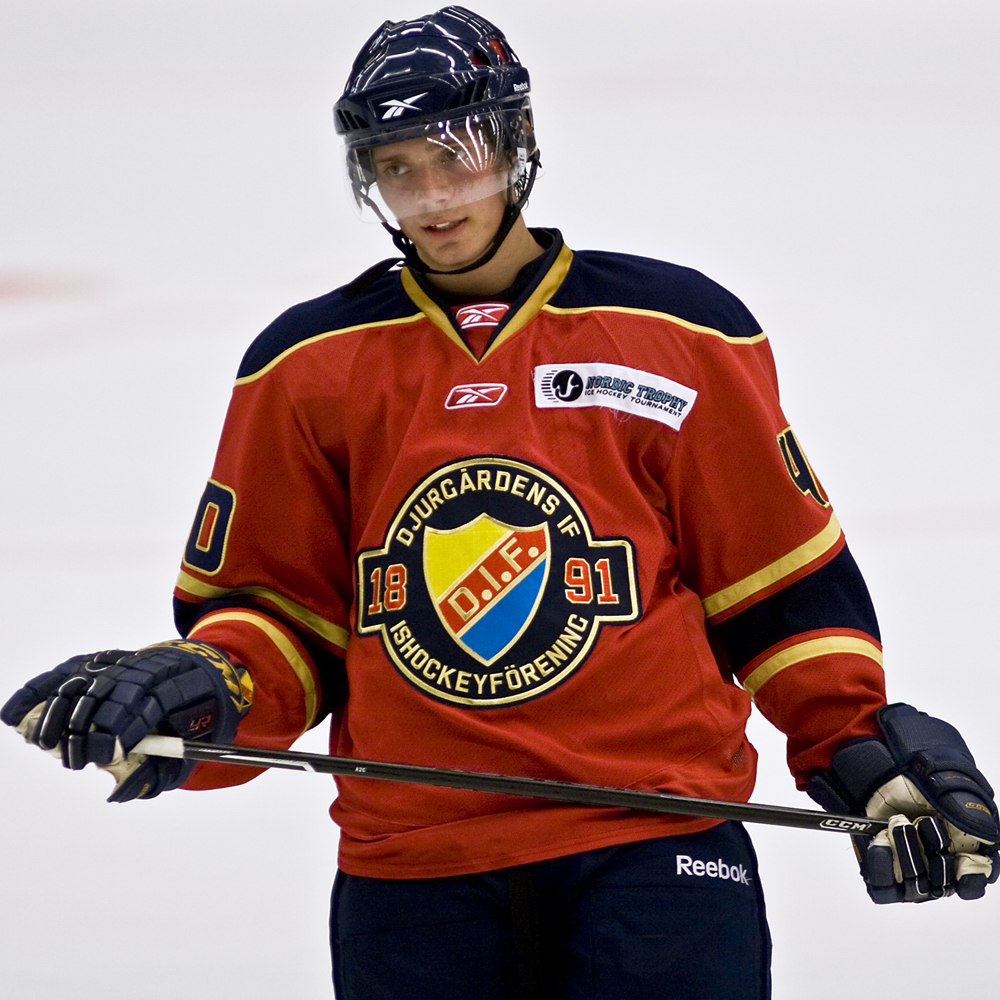
Jacob Josefson played three seasons with Djurgårdens IF.

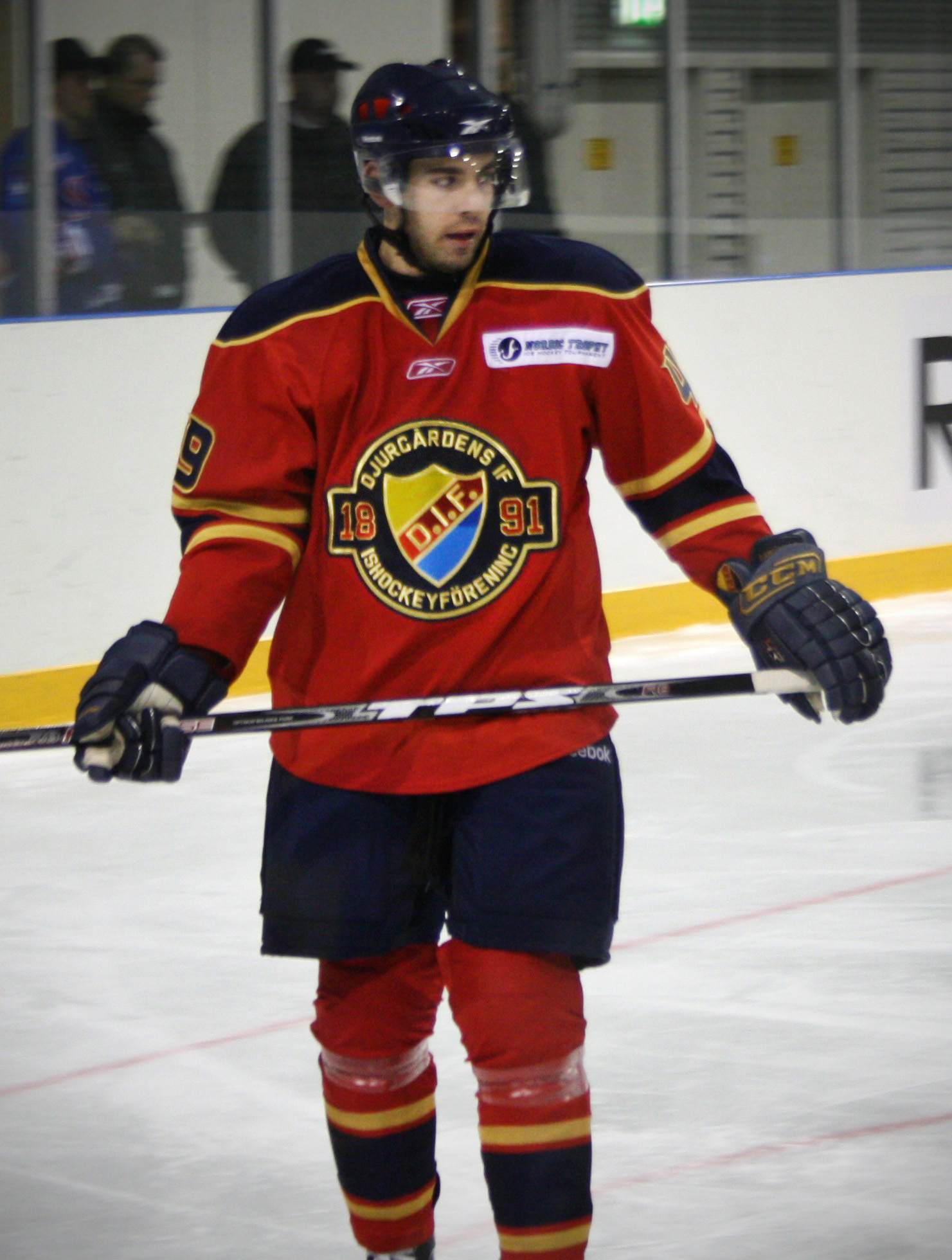
Kyle Klubertanz played two seasons with Djurgårdens IF.

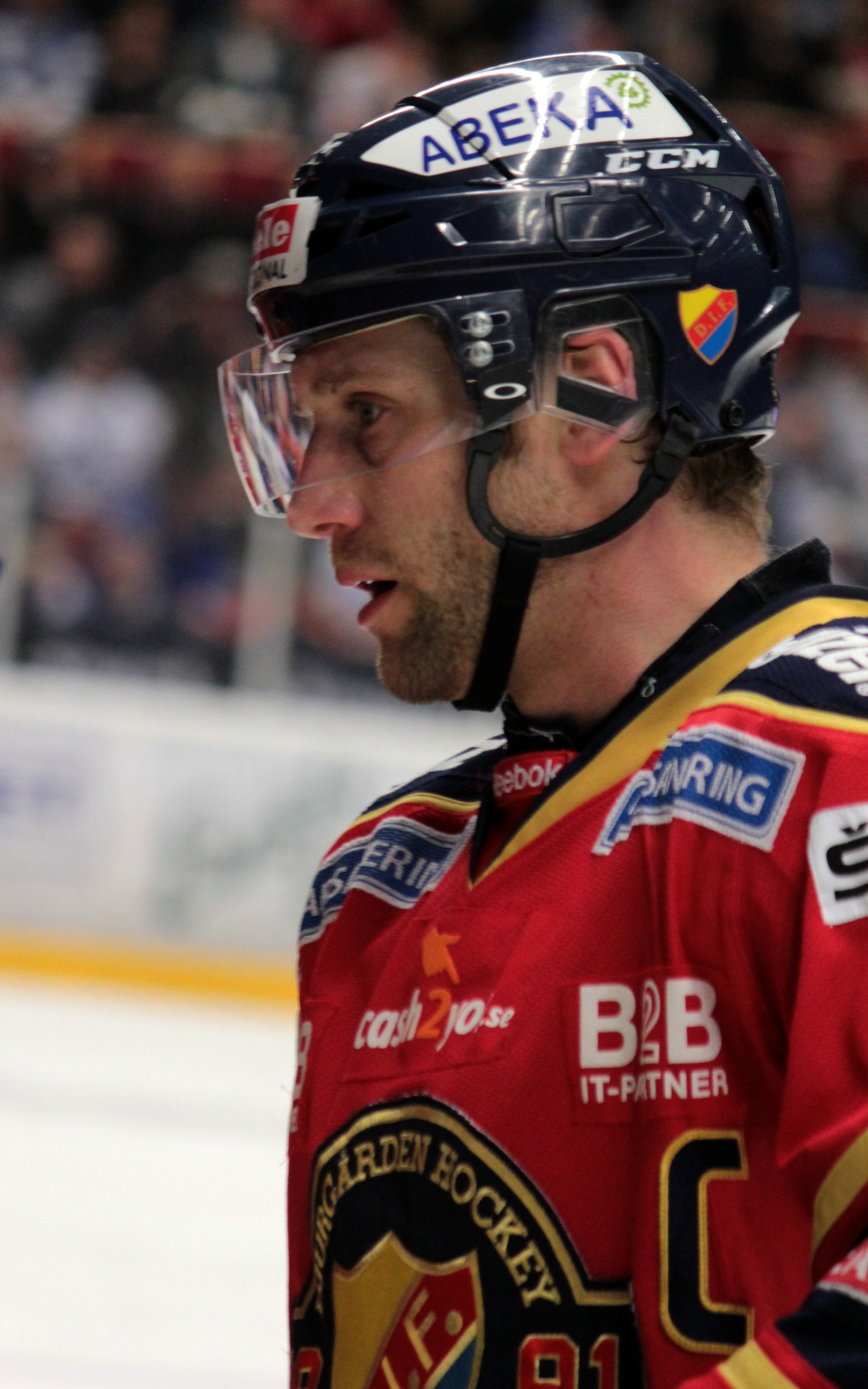
Marcus Nilson played seven seasons with Djurgårdens IF.

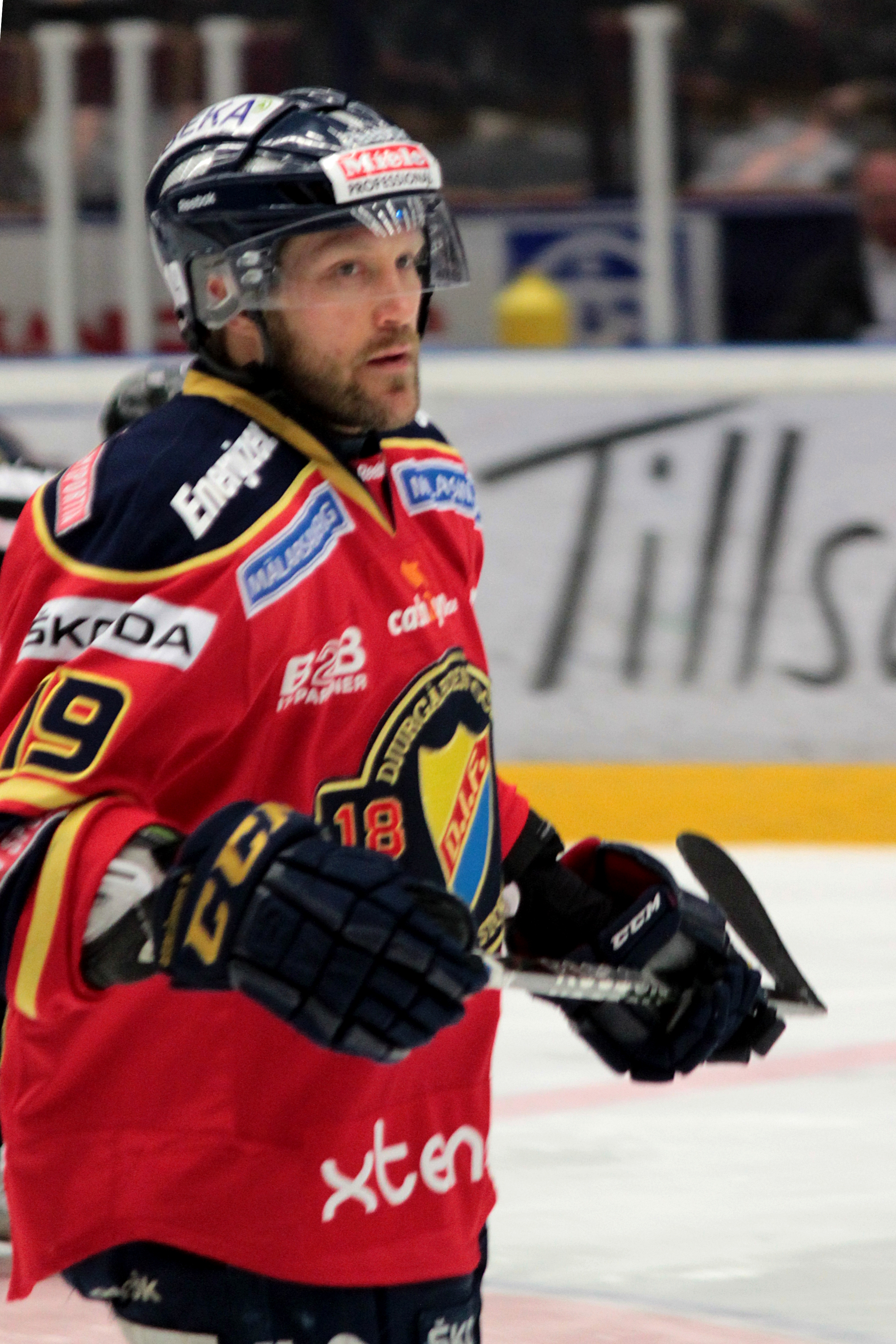
Jimmie Ölvestad played twelve seasons with Djurgårdens IF.

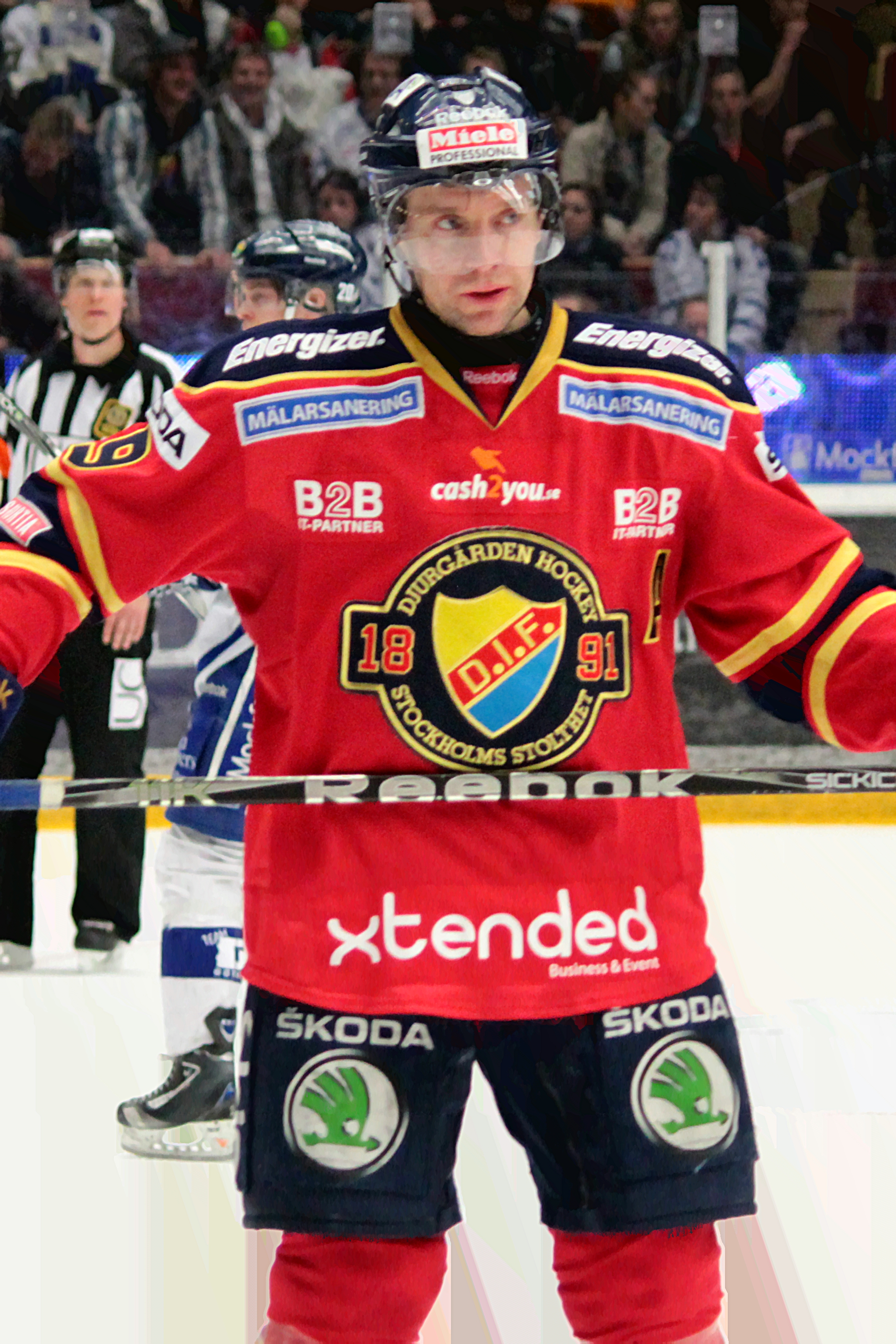
Kristofer Ottosson played 17 seasons with Djurgårdens IF.

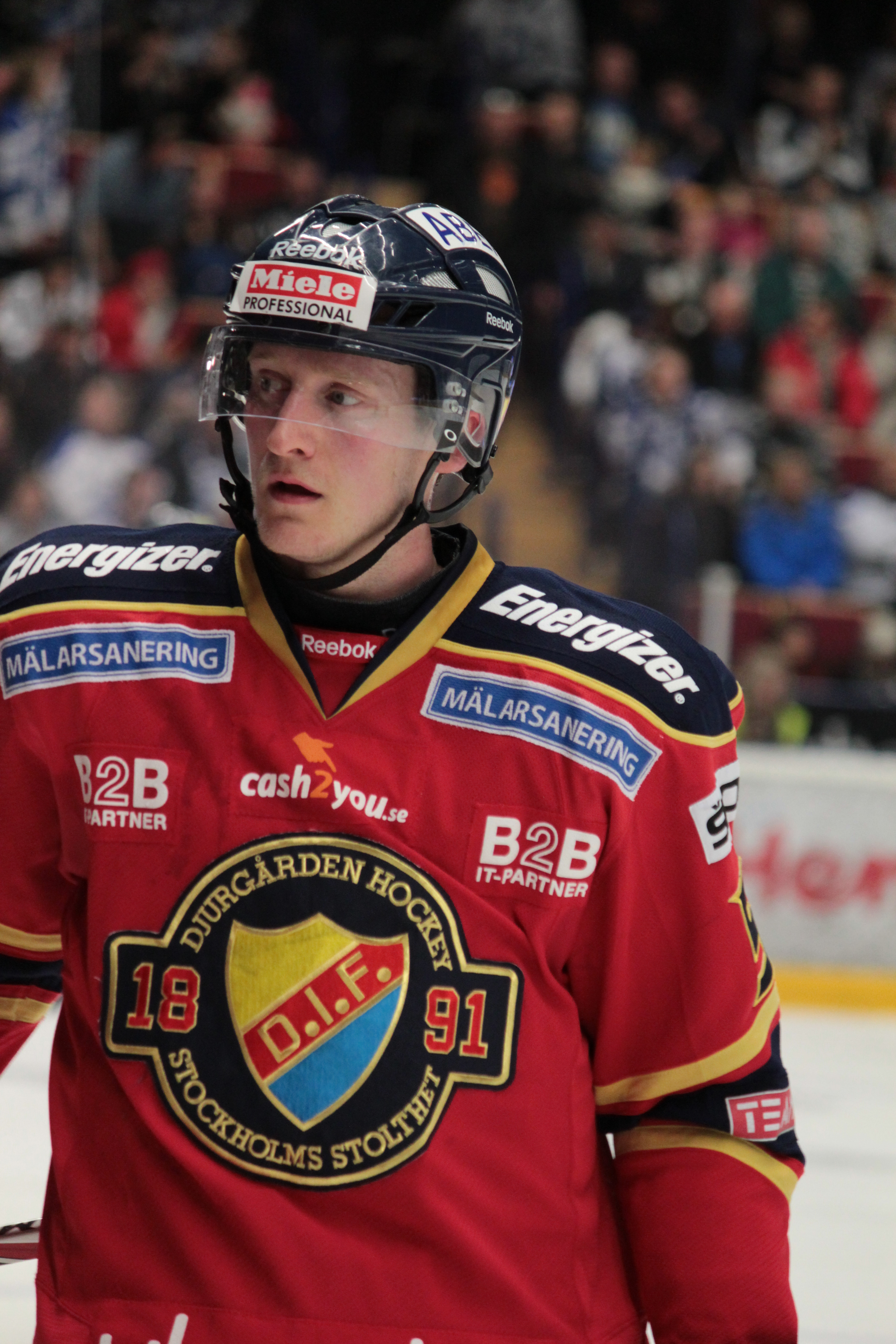
David Printz played five seasons with Djurgårdens IF.

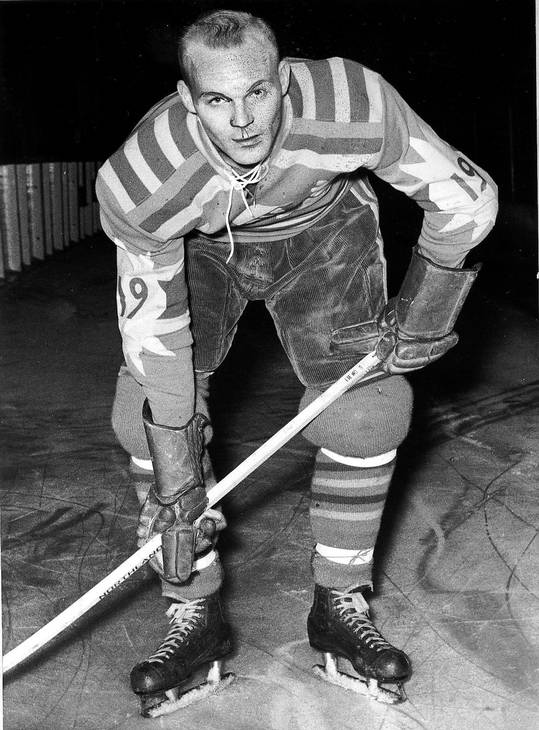
Roland Stoltz played 15 seasons with Djurgårdens IF.

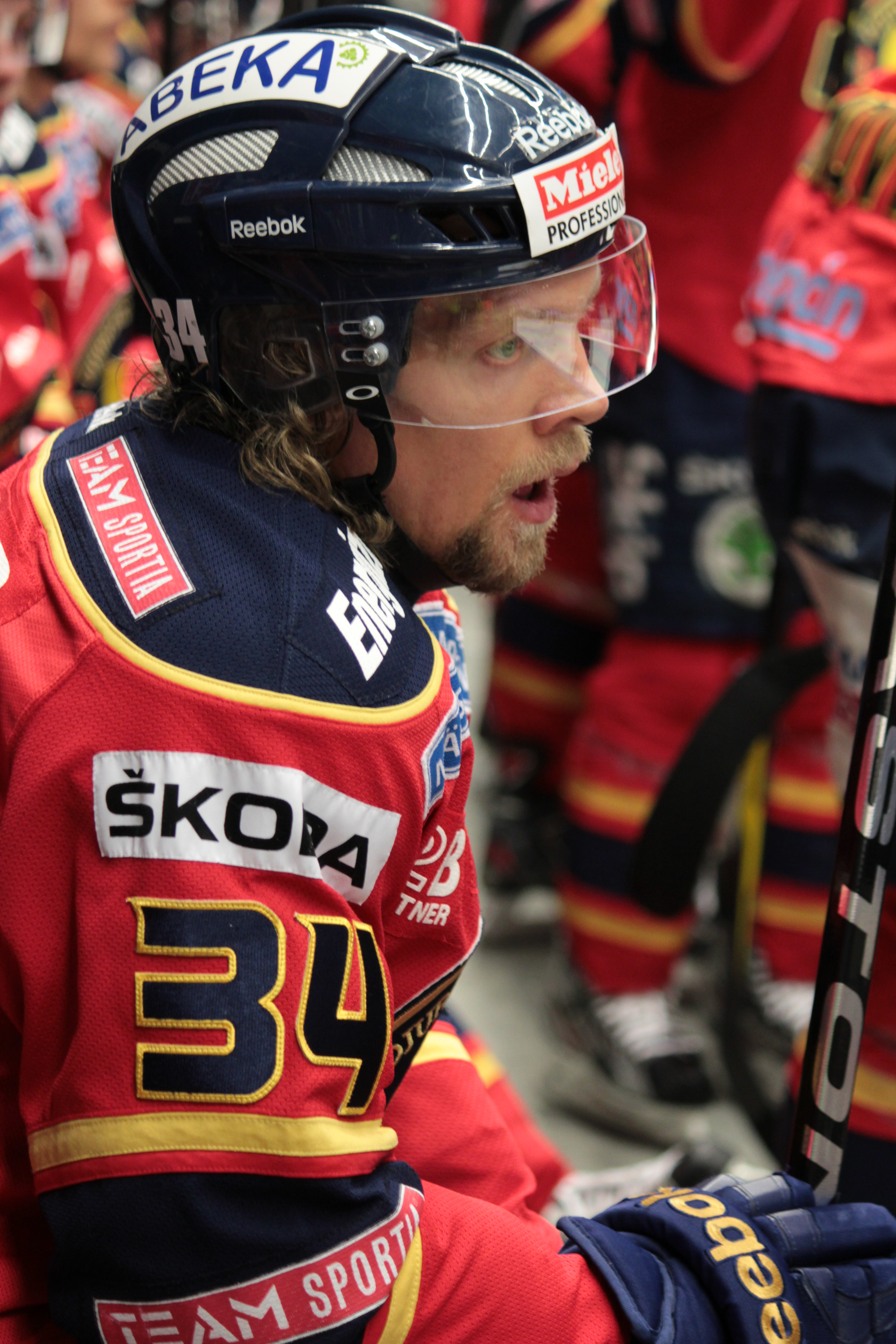
Daniel Tjärnqvist played six seasons with Djurgårdens IF.

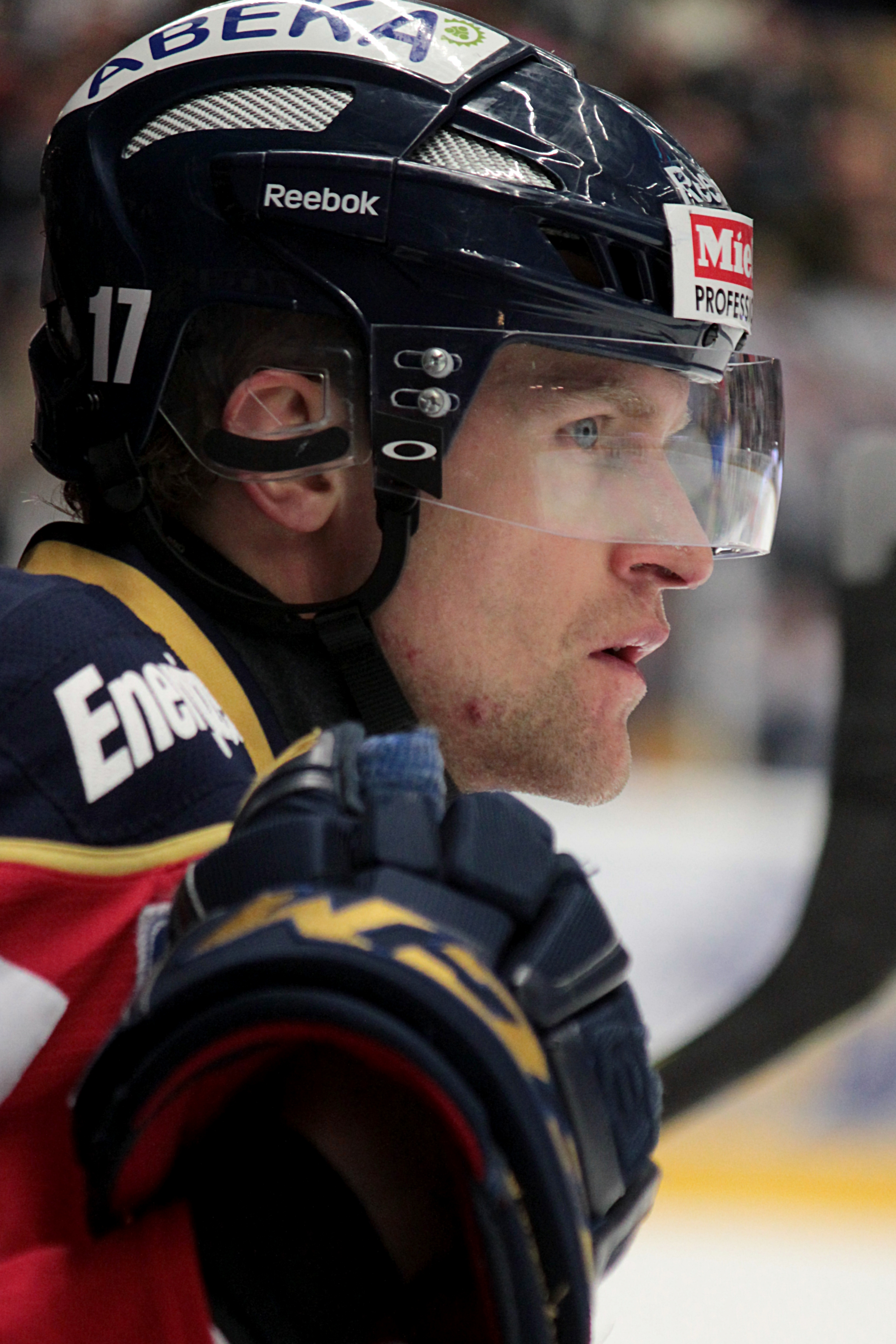
Mathias Tjärnqvist played seven seasons with Djurgårdens IF.

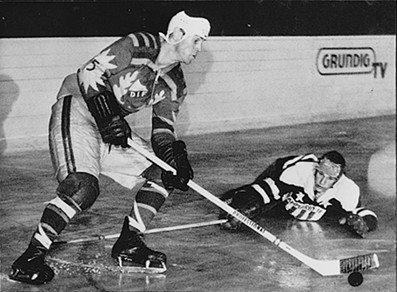
Sven Tumba played 16 seasons with Djurgårdens IF.

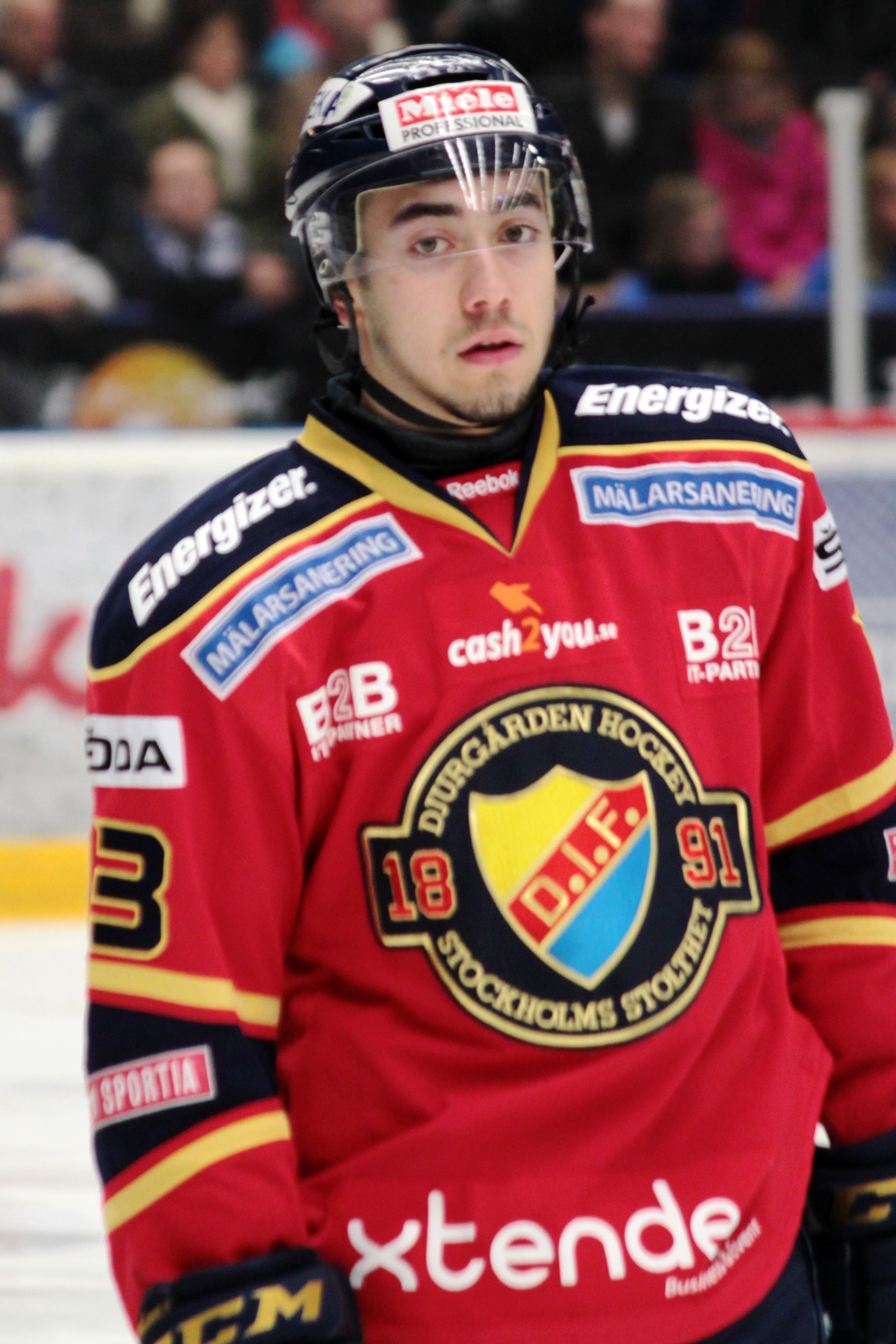
Mika Zibanejad played two seasons with Djurgårdens IF.

Name	Nationality	Pos	Djurgården career	Regular season					Play-offs				
Name	Nationality	Pos	Djurgården career	GP	G	A	P	PIM	GP	G	A	P	PIM
Pontus Åberg	Sweden	RW	2010–2013										
Carl Ackered	Sweden	D	2009–2010										
Mikael Ahlén	Sweden	RW	2006–2007; 2008–2009; 2013–										
Erik Ahlström	Sweden		1983–1986										
Martin Ahnelöv	Sweden	D	2013–2014										
Bengt Åkerblom	Sweden		1987–1990										
Tommy Albelin	Sweden	D	1982–1987	149	31	31	62	127	20	3	2	5	8
Ruben Allinger	Sweden												
Tomas Alm	Sweden	LW	2000–2001										
Jonas Almtorp	Sweden	C	2011–2012										
Robin Álvarez	Sweden	LW	2014–										
Arne Andersen	Sweden	D	1977–1979										
Adam Andersson	Sweden	D	2005–2006										
Folke Andersson	Sweden												
Jan Andersson	Sweden	D	1975–1978										
Joakim Andersson	Sweden	D	1994–1995										
Karl-Erik Andersson	Sweden												
Michael Andersson	Sweden		1976–1977										
Niklas Andersson	Sweden	D	2008–2009										
Nils Andersson	Sweden	D	2012–2014										
Ola Andersson	Sweden		1988–1990										
Sven Andersson	Sweden												
Sune Andersson	Sweden												
Hans Andersson-Tvilling	Sweden												
Stig Andersson-Tvilling	Sweden												
Niklas Anger	Sweden	RW	1994–1998; 2007–2009										
Linus Arnesson	Sweden	D	2011–										
Wilhelm Arwe	Sweden												
Morten Ask	Norway	C	2006–2008										
Dick Axelsson	Sweden	LW	2007–2009										
Pär Bäcker	Sweden	C	2006–2008										
Nils Bäckström	Sweden	D	2005–2006										
Niklas Barklund	Sweden	RW	1998–1999										
Folke Bengtsson	Sweden	C	1975–1976										
Kent Bengtsson	Sweden		1975–1977										
Rolf Berggren	Sweden												
Bo Berglund	Sweden	RW	1977–1983										
Charles Berglund	Sweden	C	1987–1995; 1997–2001	487	89	173	262	440	97	16	39	55	64
Kenneth Bergqvist	Sweden	RW	2003–2004										
Per Bilén	Sweden	D	1984–1986										
Jesper Björck	Sweden	D	2005–2006										
Stefan Björk	Sweden	D	1995–1997										
Lasse Björn	Sweden	D	1949–1966										
Arto Blomsten	Sweden	D	1983–1993										
Ludwig Blomstrand	Sweden	LW	2011–2013										
Marcus Bohman	Sweden	D	2012–2013										
Arne Boman	Sweden												
Jonas Borgar	Sweden		1994–1995										
Bengt Bornström	Sweden												
François Bouchard	Canada	D	2000–2001	48	10	11	21	58	16	2	3	5	14
Josef Boumedienne	Sweden	D	2010–2012	88	7	40	47	105	7	0	3	3	6
Dan Boyle	Canada	D	2004–2005	32	9	9	18	47	12	2	3	5	26
Dag Bredberg	Sweden		1979–1983										
Fredrik Bremberg	Sweden	LW	1990–1998; 2002–2009; 2012–2013	639	183	335	518	238	81	18	15	33	22
Daniel Brodin	Sweden	RW	2008–2012										
Steve Cardwell	Canada		1976–1977										
Björn Carlsson	Sweden		1980–1987										
Daniel Carlsson	Sweden	D	1996–1999										
Mattias Carlsson	Sweden	LW	2011–2012										
Patrick Cehlin	Sweden	LW	2009–2012										
Fredrik Claesson	Sweden	D	2010–2012										
Jan Claesson	Sweden		1982–1985										
Mariusz Czerkawski	Poland	RW	1991–1992; 1993–1994; 2004–2005										
Håkan Dahllöf	Sweden	C	1977–1982										
Robin Dahlstrøm	Norway	LW	2013–2014										
Nicklas Danielsson	Sweden	RW	2006–2010										
Alexander Deilert	Sweden	D	2008–2011; 2014–										
Christian Due-Boje	Sweden	D	1986–1997										
Niklas Eckerblom	Sweden	RW	2002–2004										
Mats Edholm	Sweden	D	1983–1984										
Christian Eklund	Sweden	LW	2001–2005; 2006–2013	455	61	70	131	539	66	3	4	7	122
Oscar Eklund	Sweden	D	2006–2011										
Per Eklund	Sweden	RW	1994–2000; 2005–2006										
Nils Ekman	Sweden	LW	2001–2002; 2004–2005; 2010–2011										
Peter Ekroth	Sweden	D	1980–1982										
Åke Eksell	Sweden		1982–1984										
Johan Eneqvist	Sweden	C	2005–2006										
Andreas Englund	Sweden	D	2013–										
Andreas Engqvist	Sweden	C	2005–2010										
Patrik Erickson	Sweden	C	1993–1999										
Fredrik Ericson	Sweden	D	2006–2008										
Håkan Eriksson	Sweden	C	1978–1984										
Henrik Eriksson	Sweden	LW	2007–2010; 2012–										
Joakim Eriksson	Sweden	C	1999–2003; 2013–										
Thomas Eriksson	Sweden	D	1976–1978; 1981–1983; 1986–1994	463	116	136	252	753	62	13	13	26	96
Tim Eriksson	Sweden	LW	2008–2013										
Tomaz Eriksson	Sweden		1986–1989										
Alexander Falk	Sweden	D	2011–										
Nichlas Falk	Sweden	C	1995–2011	753	94	244	338	346	115	16	35	51	56
Alexander Fällström	Sweden	RW	2014–										
Daniel Fernholm	Sweden	D	2001–2005; 2006–2007; 2014–										
Robin Figren	Sweden	RW	2008–2009										
Jonas Finn-Olsson	Sweden	C	2000–2001										
Damien Fleury	France	RW	2014–										
Johan Forsander	Sweden	LW	2001–2003										
Rikard Franzén	Sweden	D	2004–2005										
Leif Fredblad	Sweden												
Jerry Friman	Sweden		1992–1994										
Christoffer From-Björk	Sweden	D	2005–2006										
Edvin Frylén	Sweden	D	2000–2002; 2007–2008										
Johan Garpenlöv	Sweden	RW	1986–1990; 2000–2002										
Joachim Gellerstedt	Sweden	LW	2003–2004										
Mikael Good	Sweden	D	1982–1983										
Per Göransson	Sweden		1978–1979; 1983–1987										
Elias Granath	Sweden	D	2012–2013										
Peter Gudmundsson	Sweden		1975–1978										
Lars Gunnarson	Sweden		1980–1981										
Carl Gustafsson	Sweden	LW	2007–2010										
Erik Gustafsson	Sweden	D	2011–2013										
Stefan Gustavson	Sweden	LW	1990–1991										
Lars-Åke Gustavsson	Sweden	D	1975–1977										
Mattias Guter	Sweden	RW	2013–										
Simon Gysbers	Canada	D	2014–										
Tobias Hage	Sweden	C	2014–										
Joakim Hagelin	Sweden	LW	2013–2014										
Björn Haglund	Sweden	D	1982–1984										
Jimmy Haglund	Sweden	D	1975–1978										
Mikael Håkanson	Sweden	LW	1992–1994; 1996–2002										
Mathias Hällback	Sweden	RW	1992–1995										
Jeff Hällegård	Sweden	C	1982–1984; 1986–1987										
Lars Hallström	Sweden	LW	1997–2000										
Mika Hannula	Sweden	RW	2009–2010										
Anders Hansson	Sweden	D	1979–1980										
Nordin Harfaoui	Sweden	C	2002–2003										
János Hári	Hungary	LW	2012–2013										
Jonathan Hedström	Sweden	LW	2003–2004										
Nicklas Heinerö	Sweden	RW	2013–										
Thomas Helander	Sweden		1975–1976										
Christian Henriksson	Sweden	D	1982–1985										
Göran Hermansson	Norway	C	1996–1997										
Marcus Högström	Sweden	D	2013–										
Philip Holm	Sweden	D	2010–										
Jörgen Holmberg	Sweden		1982–1988										
Andreas Holmqvist	Sweden	D	2008–2012										
Michael Holmqvist	Sweden	C	1996–1997; 2008–2010; 2012–										
Patric Hörnqvist	Sweden	RW	2005–2008; 2012–2013										
Anders Huusko	Sweden	RW	1991–1996										
Erik Huusko	Sweden	RW	1991–1996										
Andrejs Ignatovičs	Latvia	RW	2001–2002										
Micael Jagusch	Sweden	D	1983–1984										
Jens Jakobs	Sweden	RW	2013–2014										
Tommy Jakobsen	Norway	D	1995–1996										
Magnus Jansson	Sweden		1987–1988; 1990–1996										
Stefan Jansson	Sweden	D	1982–1984; 1986–1988										
Jimmy Jensen	Sweden	LW	2005–2007										
Juha Joenväärä	Finland	LW	2002–2003										
Bo Johansson	Sweden	D	1980–1981										
Glenn Johansson	Sweden		1979–1980										
Gösta Johansson	Sweden		1947–1951; 1953–1960										
Kent Johansson	Sweden	C	1982–1983; 1989–1990										
Kjell-Anders Johansson	Sweden		1977–1979										
Mikael Johansson	Sweden	C	1985–1992; 1997–2005	582	142	295	437	181	118	32	51	83	22
Nils Johansson	Sweden												
Sören Johansson	Sweden	RW	1975–1981										
Thomas Johansson	Sweden	D	1991–2000; 2006–2008										
Tim Johansson-Bräck	Sweden	C	2005–2006										
Dustin Johner	Canada	C	2012–2014										
Anders Johnson	Sweden		1983–1991										
Jacob Josefson	Sweden	C	2008–2010										
Ola Josefsson	Sweden		1988–1997										
Mattias Kalin	Sweden	C	2012–2014										
Petr Kalus	Czech Republic	RW	2012–2014										
Anders Kallur	Sweden		1978–1979	36	25	22	47	32	4	3	3	6	2
David Kangas	Sweden		1992–1993										
Kyösti Karjalainen	Sweden	RW	2000–2002										
Ernst Karlberg	Sweden												
Bertil Karlsson	Sweden	D	1976–1978										
Yngve Karlsson	Sweden												
Veli-Pekka Kautonen	Finland	D	1996–1997										
Johan Kejnemar	Sweden	D	1989–1990										
Mario Kempe	Sweden	RW	2010–2012										
Kenneth Kennholt	Sweden	D	1988–1993; 1997–1998										
Stefan Ketola	Sweden	RW	1991–1992										
Patric Kjellberg	Sweden	LW	1995–1998										
Kyle Klubertanz	United States	D	2009–2010; 2011–2012										
Espen Knutsen	Norway	C	1994–1997; 1998–2000; 2003–2005										
Tomas Kollar	Sweden	C	2003–2005										
Mikko Konttila	Finland	LW	1999–2000										
Tero Konttinen	Finland	D	2008–2009										
Marcus Kristoffersson	Sweden	RW	2000–2001; 2003–2006; 2008–2009										
Niklas Kronwall	Sweden	D	1999–2003										
Staffan Kronwall	Sweden	D	2002–2005; 2010–2011										
Måns Krüger	Sweden	C	2013–2014										
Marcus Krüger	Sweden	C	2008–2011										
Antti-Pekka Lamberg	Finland	D	2005–2006										
Gabriel Landeskog	Sweden	LW	2008–2009; 2012–2013										
Anders Larsson	Sweden		1994–1995										
Bengt Larsson	Sweden												
Dick Larsson	Sweden		1982–1984										
Stig Larsson	Sweden		1975–1979										
Stefan Lassen	Denmark	D	2010–2011										
Sebastian Lauritzen	Sweden	LW	2013–										
Kim Lennhammer	Sweden	D	2008–2013										
David Lidström	Sweden	D	2012–2014										
Karl-Erik Lilja	Sweden	D	1979–1990										
Tobias Liljendahl	Sweden	LW	2012–2014										
Tobias Lindberg	Sweden	LW	2012–2014										
Peter Lindelöf	Sweden	RW	2001–2003										
Erik Lindgren	Sweden		1925–1934										
Peter Lindgren	Sweden	D	1985–1986	30	1	4	5	16	—	—	—	—	—
Martin Lindman	Sweden	D	2006–2007										
Johan Lindstedt	Sweden		1990–1992										
Johan Lindström	Sweden	C	2002–2003										
Martin Linse	Sweden		1981–1984										
Richard Lintner	Slovakia	D	2003–2004										
Jonas Liwing	Sweden	D	2005–2007										
Markus Ljungh	Sweden	C	2012–										
Christofer Löfberg	Sweden	C	2004–2007										
Sam Lofquist	United States	D	2013–2014										
David Longstaff	England	RW	2001–2002										
Fredrik Lovén	Sweden	D	1995–1997										
Emil Lundberg	Sweden	LW	2013–										
Joakim Lundberg	Sweden	D	1992–1998										
Patrik Lundh	Sweden	LW	2006–2007										
Per-Anton Lundström	Sweden	D	2002–2003										
Mikael Magnusson	Sweden	D	1992–2003	454	47	58	105	628	86	9	15	24	126
Torsten Magnusson	Sweden												
Fredrik Mälberg	Sweden	D	1998–1999										
Ove Malmberg	Sweden												
Jiří Marušák	Czech Republic	D	2006–2007										
Markus Matthiasson	Sweden	RW	1997–1998										
André Mattsson	Sweden	D	2005–2006										
Hans Mild	Sweden		1955–1964										
Simon Mitman	Sweden	RW	2009–2011										
Pontus Molander	Sweden		1982–1988										
Tommy Mörth	Sweden		1978–1988										
Douglas Murray	Sweden	D	2012–2013										
Joakim Musakka	Sweden	D	1993–1996										
Anders Myrvold	Norway	D	1998–1999										
Tord Nänzén	Sweden	D	1978–1986										
Lennart Nierenburg	Sweden												
Marcus Nilson	Sweden	RW	1995–1998; 2004–2005; 2009–2012; 2014–										
Patrik Nilson	Sweden	C	1999–2000; 2005–2006										
Kent Nilsson	Sweden	C	1975–1976; 1988–1989; 1992–1993										
Lars-Göran Nilsson	Sweden	D	1975–1976										
Peter Nilsson	Sweden		1983–1995										
Robert Nilsson	Sweden	LW	2004–2005										
Björn Nord	Sweden	D	1992–2000; 2001–2004	464	91	122	213	549	71	11	22	33	103
Robert Nordberg	Sweden	LW	2003–2004										
Henrik Nordfeldt	Sweden	C	2005–2006										
Markus Nordlund	Finland	D	2014–										
Robert Nordmark	Sweden	D	1993–1995; 1997–1998; 2003–2004										
Kenneth Nordström	Sweden		1977–1979										
Robin Norell	Sweden	D	2013–										
John Norman	Sweden	C	2009–2012										
Claes Norström	Sweden	D	1977–1980; 1987–1989										
Henrik Nyberg	Sweden	RW	2013–2014										
Per Nygårds	Sweden	D	1990–1992										
Lars-Fredrik Nyström	Sweden	D	1977–1982										
Carl-Göran Öberg	Sweden	LW											
Mikael Öberg	Sweden	D	2003–2004										
Johnny Oduya	Sweden	D	2003–2005										
Jens Öhling	Sweden	LW	1979–1997	592	192	190	382	111	73	24	24	48	10
Adam Ollas Mattsson	Sweden	D	2013–										
Jimmie Ölvestad	Sweden	LW	1998–2001; 2004–2013	547	87	94	181	854	79	20	11	31	128
Arne Orrestedt	Sweden		1976–1977										
Vladimír Országh	Slovakia	RW	2000–2001										
Kristofer Ottosson	Sweden	C	1994–1997; 1999–2013	723	176	210	386	250	101	23	18	41	18
Kenny Palmberg	Sweden		1975–1976										
Björn Palmqvist	Sweden	C	1966–1973; 1974–1978	292	210	147	357	67					
Ján Pardavý	Slovakia	RW	2001–2002										
Stefan Perlström	Sweden	D	1977–1989										
Dennis Persson	Sweden	D	2006–2008										
Sebastian Persson	Sweden	C	2011–2012										
Bobo Petersson	Sweden	D	2013–2014										
Henrik Petré	Sweden	D	1998–1999										
Ronnie Pettersson	Sweden	D	1990–1991; 1996–2009										
Stefan Pettersson	Sweden	LW	2003–2004										
Timmy Pettersson	Sweden	D	2006–2010; 2012–2014										
David Printz	Sweden	D	2007–2012										
Daniel Rafner	Sweden	LW	2002–2003										
Marcus Ragnarsson	Sweden	D	1989–1995; 2008–2011	269	39	64	103	209	43	1	8	9	40
Rickard Rauge	Sweden		1985–1986										
Peter Redner	Sweden		1983–1984	1	0	0	0	0	—	—	—	—	—
Alexander Ribbenstrand	Sweden	D	2005–2007										
Jörgen Rickmo	Sweden	RW	2001–2003										
Leif Rohlin	Sweden	D	2001–2002										
Daniel Rudslätt	Sweden	LW	2002–2006										
David Rundqvist	Sweden	C	2014–										
Åke Rydberg	Sweden												
Anders Rylin	Sweden	D	1975–1977										
Erik Ryman	Norway	D	2005–2006										
Johan Ryno	Sweden	RW	2007–2008	30	2	7	9	18	5	0	0	0	0
Johannes Salmonsson	Sweden	LW	2003–2005										
Andreas Salomonsson	Sweden	LW	2000–2001										
Mikael Samuelsson	Sweden	RW	2014–										
Gösta Sandberg	Sweden												
Ola Sandberg	Sweden	D	1996–1997										
Hans Särkijärvi	Sweden		1975–1983										
Steve Saviano	United States	LW	2013–										
Ryan Savoia	Canada	C	2003–2004										
David Schneider	United States	D	2008–2009										
Lars-Erik Sjöberg	Sweden	D	1965–1967										
Christian Sjögren	Sweden	LW	1999–2001										
Stig Sjöstam	Sweden												
Leif Skiöld	Sweden		1959–1963										
Tony Skopac	Canada		1992–1993										
Stefan Söder	Sweden	RW	2009–2012										
Håkan Södergren	Sweden	LW	1977–1991	419	130	193	323	551	46	14	19	33	62
Walter Söderman	Sweden												
Marcus Sörensen	Sweden	LW	2010–2011; 2012–										
Orwar Stambert	Sweden	D	1983–1992										
Hans Stelius	Sweden												
Linus Stensson	Sweden	RW	2003–2004	1	1	0	1	0	—	—	—	—	—
Roland Stoltz	Sweden	D	1955–1970										
Tomas Strandberg	Sweden	LW	2001–2003										
Arvid Strömberg	Sweden	LW	2009–2011										
Mika Strömberg	Finland	D	2003–2006										
Ralf Sundberg	Sweden	D	1976–1977										
Oscar Sundh	Sweden	LW	2003–2005										
Mats Sundin	Sweden	C	1989–1990; 1994–1995	46	17	10	27	30	8	7	0	7	4
Billy Sundström	Sweden	D	1970–1976										
Kurt Svensson	Sweden												
Leif Svensson	Sweden	D	1975–1978; 1980–1982										
Michael Thelvén	Sweden	D	1978–1979; 1980–1985										
Patrick Thoresen	Norway	LW	2003–2006										
Christopher Thörn	Sweden	LW	2003–2007										
Kurt Thulin	Sweden												
Daniel Tjärnqvist	Sweden	D	1997–2001; 2004–2005; 2011–2012										
Mathias Tjärnqvist	Sweden	LW	1999–2003; 2009–2012										
Tommy Tomth	Sweden		1975–1977										
Matthias Trattnig	Austria	D	2001–2003										
Vyacheslav Trukhno	Russia	C	2014–										
Sven Tumba	Sweden	C	1950–1966										
Dragan Umicevic	Sweden	RW	2006–2007										
Alexander Urbom	Sweden	D	2008–2009										
Ossi Väänänen	Finland	D	2007–2008										
Jan Viktorsson	Sweden	LW	1982–1993; 1995–1999	508	143	147	290	239	76	20	20	40	57
Lukas Vejdemo	Sweden	C	2014–										
Peter Wallén	Sweden		1983–1984; 1988–1989										
Claes-Göran Wallin	Sweden	RW	1975–1981										
Hans Wallin	Sweden		1975–1976										
Peter Wallin	Sweden	RW	1975–1981										
Mats Waltin	Sweden	D	1978–1984; 1989–1990	203	54	67	121	78	21	4	6	10	16
Fredric Weigel	Sweden	C	2010–2013										
Alexander Wennberg	Sweden	C	2011–2013										
Mats Westerberg	Sweden		1982–1983										
Gösta Westerlund	Sweden												
Johannes Westring	Sweden	D	2004–2005										
Daniel Widing	Sweden	RW	2010–2011										
Lars-Göran Wiklander	Sweden	LW	1998–2000										
Per-Allan Wikström	Sweden		1975–1981										
Eddie Wingren	Sweden												
Bertz Zetterberg	Sweden												
Mika Zibanejad	Sweden	C	2010–2012										
Michael Zigomanis	Canada	C	2009–2010										
