= List of Swedish ice hockey champions (players) =

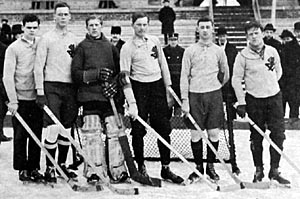
IK Göta won the inaugural Swedish Championship in 1922.

The Swedish ice hockey champions (Swedish: Svenska mästare i ishockey) is a title awarded annually to the winning playoff team of the top-tier ice hockey league in Sweden, which currently is Swedish Hockey League (SHL). It was first awarded to IK Göta in 1922, the championship's inaugural year. The championship's present SHL format did not take into effect until the league was originally formed for the 1975–76 season under the name of Elitserien. A team who wins the Swedish Championship is awarded the Le Mat Trophy. Djurgårdens IF holds the most titles in history with 16 titles. The most recent Swedish Champions are Frölunda HC, who won their fourth title in club history in 2016.

Before 1953, the Swedish champions were determined through a standalone tournament, the Swedish Ice Hockey Championship, where teams could submit their participation. In other words, the leagues were not connected with the Swedish Championship during this period. Between 1953 and 1955, the winner was decided through matches between the winners of Division 1 Norra and Division 1 Södra. From 1956 to 1965, the Swedish champions was the winner of a second round group stage following Division 1. In the years of 1966 and 1967 a play-off was played between Division 1 teams and the 1968 season saw a return to second round group stage. In the 1975–76 season, Elitserien was started and the winner of Elitserien (later SHL) play-off became Swedish ice hockey champion.

Lasse Björn and Tord Lundström have the most titles, with nine each.

Below is a list of the players awarded medals.

== Players ==
=== A ===
- Bengt Åkerblom - Djurgården 1989
- Tommy Albelin - Djurgården 1983
- Ruben Allinger - Djurgården 1926
- Folke Andersson - Djurgården 1926
- Karl-Erik Andersson - Djurgården 1950, 1954, 1955
- Ola Andersson - Djurgården 1989
- Sune Andersson - Djurgården 1926
- Sven Andersson - Djurgården 1954
- Hans Andersson-Tvilling - Djurgården 1950, 1954, 1955, 1958, 1961
- Stig Andersson-Tvilling - Djurgården 1950, 1954, 1955, 1958, 1959, 1960
- Wilhelm Arwe - Djurgården 1926

=== B ===
- Rolf Berggren - Djurgården 1958, 1959, 1960, 1961
- Bo Berglund - Djurgården 1983
- Charles Berglund - Djurgården 1989, 1990, 1991, 2000, 2001
- Lennart Berglund - Djurgården 1954, 1955
- Tommy Björkman - Djurgården 1958, 1959, 1960, 1961, 1962, 1963
- Lasse Björn - Djurgården 1950, 1954, 1955, 1958, 1959, 1960, 1961, 1962, 1963
- Arto Blomsten - Djurgården 1989, 1990, 1991
- Arne Boman - Djurgården 1958
- Bengt Bornström - Djurgården 1958
- François Bouchard - Djurgården 2001
- Dag Bredberg - Djurgården 1983

=== C ===
- Björn Carlsson - Djurgården 1983
- Jan Chmelar - Djurgården 2000
- Jan Claesson - Djurgården 1983

=== D ===
- Christian Due-Boje - Djurgården 1989, 1990, 1991

=== E ===
- Per Eklund - Djurgården 2000
- Håkan Eriksson - Djurgården 1983
- Joakim Eriksson - Djurgården 2000, 2001
- Thomas Eriksson - Djurgården 1983, 1989, 1990, 1991
- Tomaz Eriksson - Djurgården 1989

=== F ===
- Nichlas Falk - Djurgården 2000, 2001
- Jonas Finn-Olsson - Djurgården 2001
- Leif Fredblad - Djurgården 1962
- Edvin Frylén - Djurgården 2001

=== G ===
- Johan Garpenlöv - Djurgården 1989, 1990, 2001
- Mikael Good - Djurgården 1983
- Stefan Gustavson - Djurgården 1991

=== Z ===
- Mikael Håkanson - Djurgården 2000
- Lars Hallström - Djurgården 2000
- Jörgen Holmberg - Djurgården 1983
- Martin Holst - Djurgården 2001

=== J ===
- Magnus Jansson - Djurgården 1991
- Gösta Johansson - Djurgården 1950, 1954, 1955, 1958, 1959, 1960
- Kent Johansson - Djurgården 1983, 1990
- Mikael Johansson - Djurgården 1989, 1990, 1991, 2000, 2001
- Nils Johansson - Djurgården 1926
- Thomas Johansson - Djurgården 2000
- Yngve Johansson - Djurgården 1950, 1954, 1955, 1958, 1959, 1962
- Anders Johnson - Djurgården 1989, 1990, 1991
- Ola Josefsson - Djurgården 1989, 1990, 1991

=== K ===
- Kyösti Karjalainen - Djurgården 2001
- Ernst Karlberg - Djurgården 1926
- Yngve Karlsson - Djurgården 1950, 1954, 1955, 1958, 1959, 1962
- Kenneth Kennholt - Djurgården 1989, 1990, 1991
- Espen Knutsen - Djurgården 2000
- Mikko Konttila - Djurgården 2000
- Niklas Kronwall - Djurgården 2000, 2001

=== L ===
- Bengt Larsson - Djurgården 1950, 1955, 1958
- Bo Larsson - Djurgården 1983
- Calle Lilja - Djurgården 1958, 1959, 1960, 1961, 1962
- Karl-Erik Lilja - Djurgården 1983, 1990
- Erik Lindgren - Djurgården 1926
- Fredrik Lindquist - Djurgården 1991
- Johan Lindstedt - Djurgården 1991
- Martin Linse - Djurgården 1983

=== M ===
- Mikael Magnusson - Djurgården 2000, 2001
- Torsten Magnusson - Djurgården 1954
- Ove Malmberg - Djurgården 1958, 1959, 1960, 1961, 1962, 1963
- Hans Mild - Djurgården 1958, 1959, 1960, 1961, 1962, 1963
- Pontus Molander - Djurgården 1983
- Tommy Mörth - Djurgården 1983

=== N ===
- Tord Nänzén - Djurgården 1983
- Lennart Nierenburg - Djurgården 1950
- Patrik Nilson - Djurgården 2000, 2001
- Kent Nilsson - Djurgården 1989
- Peter Nilsson - Djurgården 1989, 1990, 1991
- Björn Nord - Djurgården 2000
- Claes Norström - Djurgården 1989
- Per Nygårds - Djurgården 1991

=== O ===
- Carl-Göran Öberg - Djurgården 1961, 1962, 1963
- Jens Öhling - Djurgården 1983, 1989, 1990, 1991
- Jimmie Ölvestad - Djurgården 2000, 2001
- Vladimír Országh - Djurgården 2001
- Kristofer Ottosson - Djurgården 2000, 2001

=== P ===
- Stefan Perlström - Djurgården 1983, 1989
- Joakim Persson - Djurgården 1991
- Ronnie Pettersson - Djurgården 2000, 2001
- Marcus Ragnarsson - Djurgården 1991

=== R ===
- Rolf Ridderwall - Djurgården 1983, 1989, 1990
- Petter Rönnquist - Djurgården 1991
- Åke Rydberg - Djurgården 1958, 1959, 1960, 1961, 1962, 1963

=== S ===
- Andreas Salomonsson - Djurgården 2001
- Gösta Sandberg - Djurgården 1958, 1959, 1961, 1962, 1963
- Hans Särkijärvi - Djurgården 1983
- Christian Sjögren - Djurgården 2000, 2001
- Stig Sjöstam - Djurgården 1955
- Leif Skiöld - Djurgården 1960, 1961, 1962, 1963
- Håkan Södergren - Djurgården 1983, 1989, 1990, 1991
- Walter Söderman - Djurgården 1926
- Tommy Söderström - Djurgården 1990, 1991, 2000
- Orvar Stambert - Djurgården 1989, 1990, 1991
- Hans Stelius - Djurgården 1950
- Hans Stergel - Djurgården 1963
- Roland Stoltz - Djurgården 1958, 1959, 1960, 1961, 1962, 1963
- Mats Sundin - Djurgården 1990
- Kurt Svensson - Djurgården 1963

=== T ===
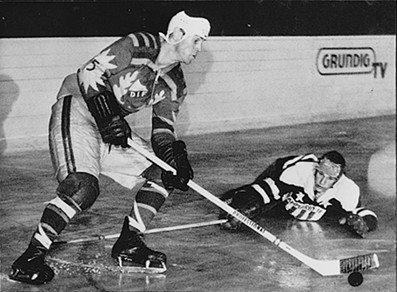
Sven Tumba won 8 Swedish championship titles for Djurgården.

- Mikael Tellqvist - Djurgården 2000, 2001
- Michael Thelvén - Djurgården 1983
- Björn Thorsell - Djurgården 1983
- Kurt Thulin - Djurgården 1959, 1960, 1962, 1963
- Daniel Tjärnqvist - Djurgården 2000, 2001
- Mathias Tjärnqvist - Djurgården 2000, 2001
- Sven Tumba - Djurgården 1954, 1955, 1958, 1959, 1960, 1961, 1962, 1963

=== V ===
- Jan Viktorsson - Djurgården 1989, 1990, 1991

=== W ===
- Peter Wallén - Djurgården 1989
- Mats Waltin - Djurgården 1983, 1990
- Gösta Westerlund - Djurgården 1963
- Mikael Westling - Djurgården 1983
- Lars-Göran Wiklander - Djurgården 2000
- Eddie Wingren - Djurgården 1959, 1960, 1961, 1962, 1963

=== Y ===
- Mats Ytter - Djurgården 1989

=== Z ===
- Bertz Zetterberg - Djurgården 1950, 1954, 1955, 1958
- Magnus Zirath - Djurgården 2000

== See also ==
- List of Swedish ice hockey champions
- List of Swedish ice hockey junior champions
- List of SHL seasons
