= François Bouchard =

François Bouchard may refer to:

- François Bouchard (ice hockey, born 1973), Canadian ice hockey defenceman
- François Bouchard (ice hockey, born 1988), Canadian ice hockey right winger
