= Peter Hammarström =

Swedish ice hockey player and coach

- Born: 23 March 1969 (age 56); Stockholm, Sweden
- Position: Right wing
- Shot: Right
- Played for: AIK; HV71; Eisbären Berlin; Färjestads BK; Malmö Redhawks
- Current SDHL coach: HV71 Dam
- Playing career: 1987–2006
- Coaching career: 2021–present

Peter "Humlan" Hammarström (born 23 March 1969) is a Swedish former professional ice hockey player and the current general manager and head coach of HV71 Dam, an ice hockey team in the Swedish Women's Hockey League (SDHL).

== Playing career ==
Hammarström played a total of seventeen seasons in the Elitserien, the top men's professional league in Sweden (renamed Swedish Hockey League in 2013). He made his Elitserien debut at age 19 with AIK in the 1987–88 season, recording seven points in seven games played. He played with AIK until 1993 and then spent three seasons with HV71. Hammarström returned to AIK in 1996 and was named an alternate captain ahead of the 1997–98 season. During the 1998–99 season with AIK, he recorded the best single-season point total of his career, notching 18 goals and 19 assists for 37 points in 44 games (0.841 points per game) and ranking third on the team for scoring – only his linemates, left winger Stefan Gustavson and centre Kristian Gahn, ranked ahead of him.

Hammarström then played two seasons in the Deutsche Eishockey Liga (DEL) with the Eisbären Berlin. In the 1999–2000 season, he was one of four Swedes on a majority-international team and found success on lines with Canadian expats. He registered 23 assists, a career-high, and exceeded his single-season points per game record with 0.923 points per game from 36 points in 39 games. The 2000–01 season saw significant shuffling of the lines, which resulted in much diminished totals for Hammarström, who recorded just 12 points in 45 games.

Following two seasons in Germany, Hammarström returned to the Elitserien and joined Färjestads BK during the 2001–02 to 2003–04 seasons. He spent the 2004–05 season as an alternate captain with the Malmö Redhawks and returned to HV71 to conclude his career in the 2005–06 season.

After his retirement in 2006, he worked as a color commentator for Canal+.
