= Bengt Larsson =

Bengt Larsson may refer to:

- Bengt Larsson (ice hockey)
- Bengt Larsson (speedway rider)
- Bengt Ulf Sebastian Larsson, Swedish footballer
