= Neck guard =

Protective sports gear worn around the neck

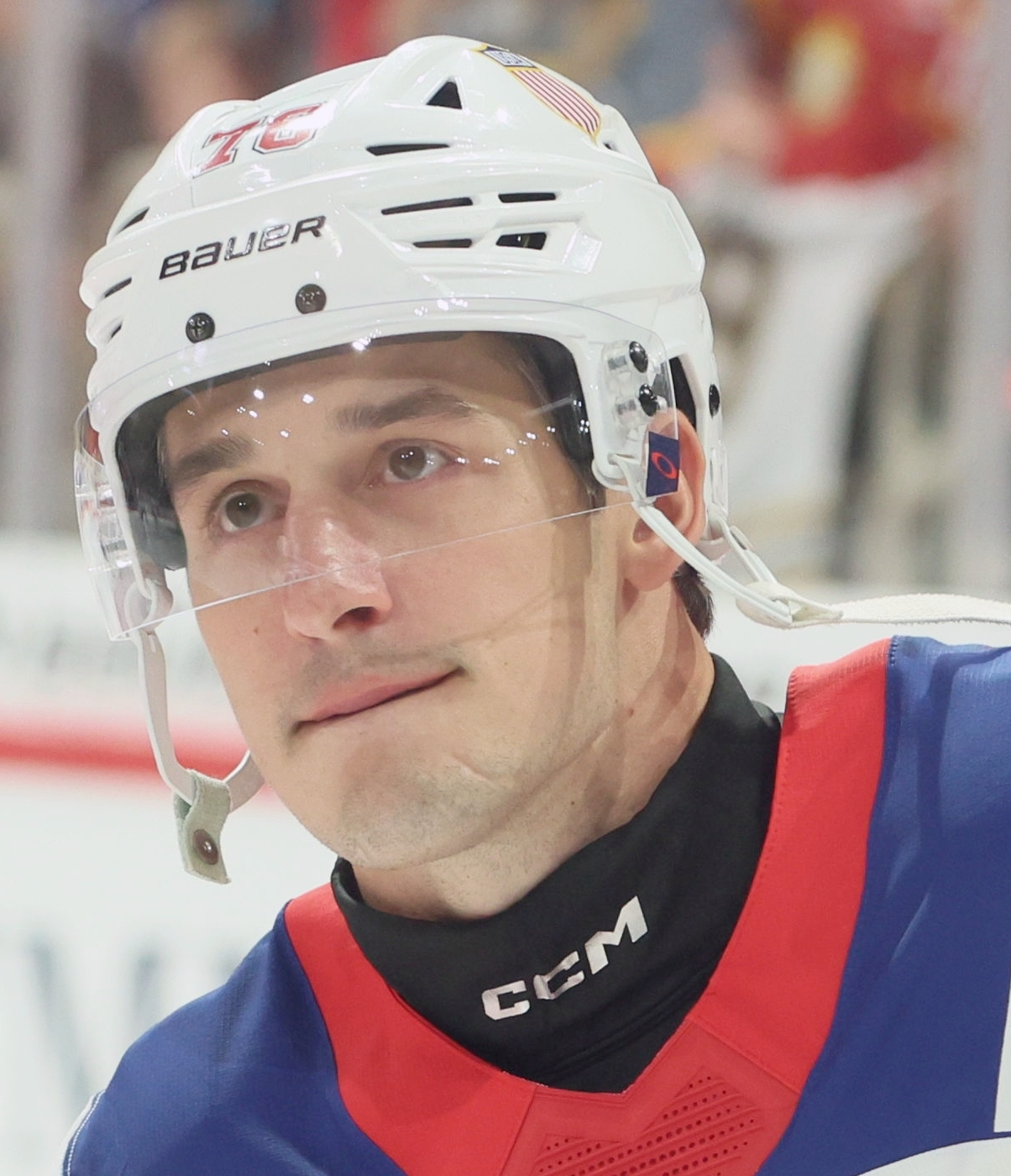
Brady Skjei wearing a cut-resistant neck guard in 2025

A neck guard is a piece of protective equipment worn by ice hockey players and officials.

The guard is designed to prevent injury to the neck by pucks, the metal blades on ice skates, and ice hockey sticks. This piece is especially critical to goaltenders, especially ice hockey goaltenders, who are more likely at risk to be injured in this area.

It may also be worn by players and officials in other ice sports such as bandy, ringette, and rinkball.

Rules regarding neck guards and their use vary by sport, league, level of play, and age.

== History ==
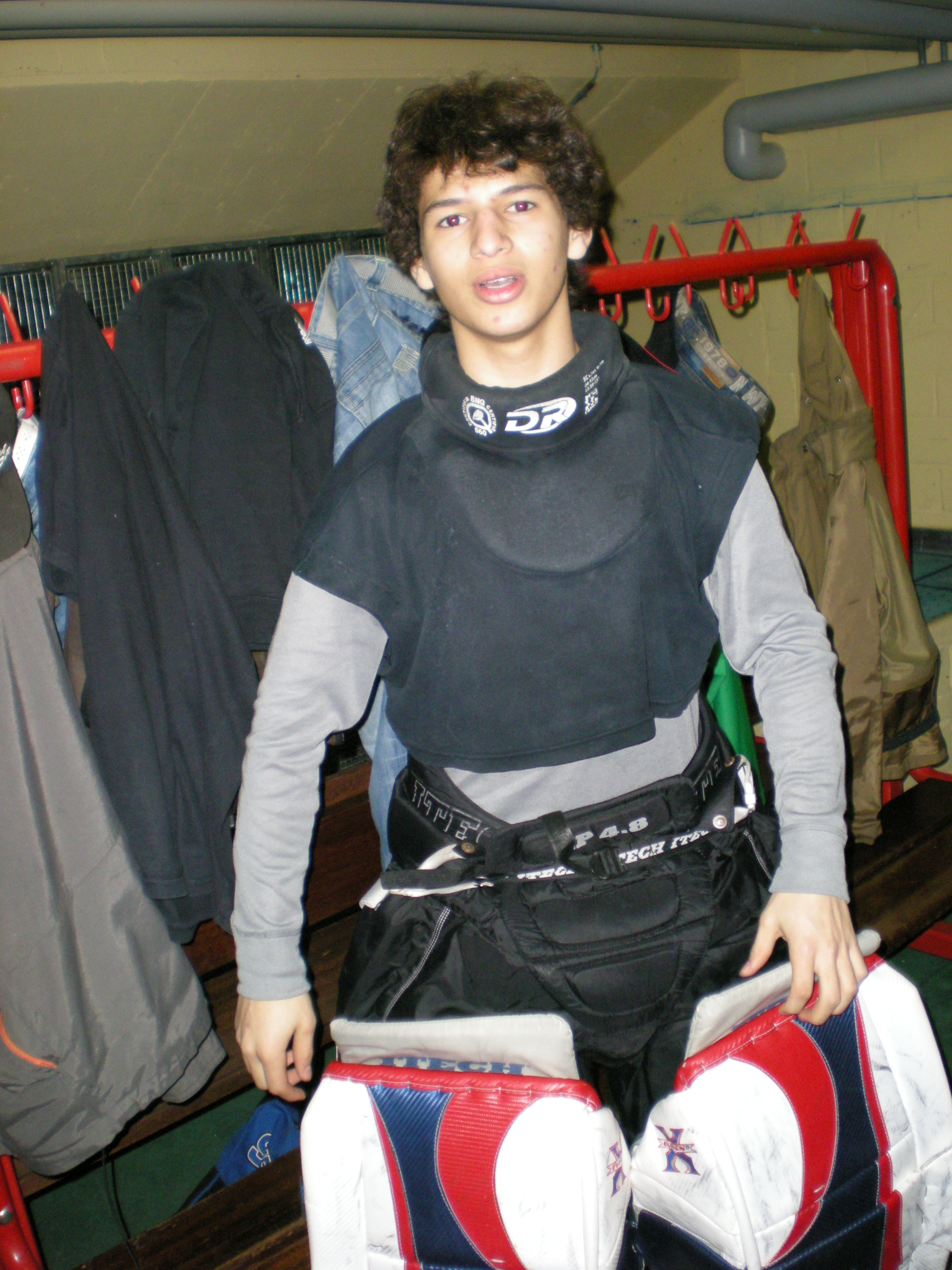
A goaltender wearing a neck guard

The guard was developed in Ontario, Canada, after Kim Crouch, goalkeeper of the Royal York Royals, suffered a serious neck injury when his jugular vein was sliced by a skate when he dove into a fray during a 1975 match against the Markham Waxers. Both teams were competing in the Ontario Provincial Junior A Hockey League. Kim Crouch's father, Ed Crouch, developed a prototype neck-guard to help him return to the game. The guard was subsequently widely adopted by ice hockey players.

In Canada, neck protectors worn by ringette and ice hockey players must contain fabric that is BNQ certified and approved. BNQ stands for Bureau de normalisation du Québec. Based in Quebec, BNQ is an organization that created the standard for cut-resistant neck guards. The test requires the neck guard have a certain amount of coverage that is determined by standards that BNQ developed. The test is a blade on a swinging test apparatus that is run across the neck guard to test for cut penetration. One such example of neck guards of this type are manufactured by Bauer Hockey.

Most neck guards have a moisture system which helps keep the guard cool, ensuring the player's neck won't become too hot while working.

=== Notable injuries ===
Buffalo Sabres goalie Clint Malarchuk suffered a severe injury during a game against the St. Louis Blues on March 22, 1989, when Steve Tuttle collided in front of Malarchuk's goal and his skates got caught on the front of Malarchuk's neck, slicing open his internal jugular vein. Malarchuk made a full recovery, but would have almost certainly died if medical assistance was not provided. Ever since then, many National Hockey League (NHL) goaltenders have worn neck guards, such as Henrik Lundqvist, Marc-André Fleury, and Semyon Varlamov. However, it isn't required for NHL goaltenders to wear them.

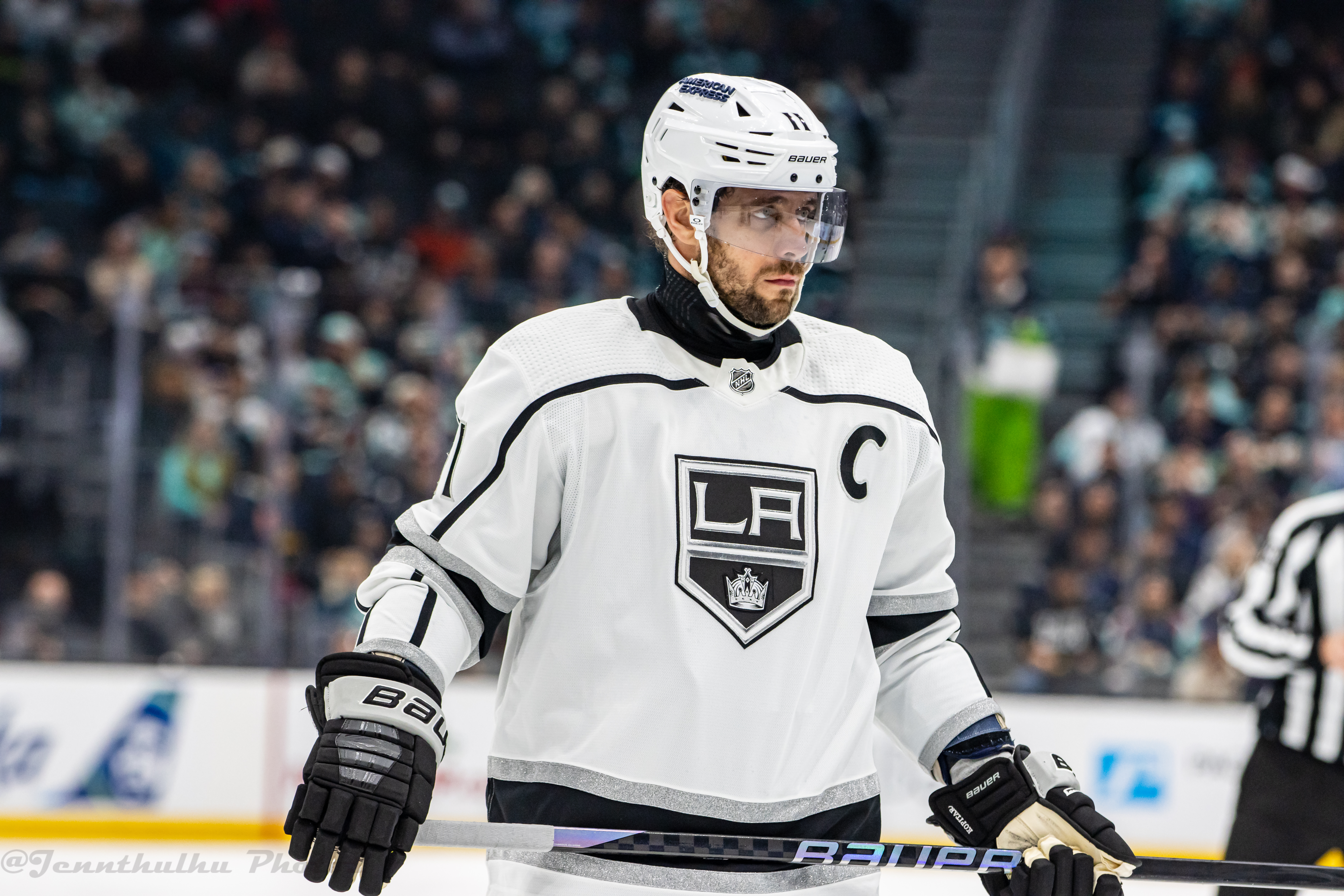
Anže Kopitar of the Los Angeles Kings wearing a neck guard in 2023. In response to Adam Johnson's death, many players from professional hockey leagues around the world began wearing neck guards in greater numbers.

On February 10, 2008, Florida Panthers forward Richard Zedník was behind the play and skating into the right corner of the Buffalo Sabres' zone, when teammate Olli Jokinen lost his balance after being checked by Clarke MacArthur. Jokinen fell head-first to the ice, his right leg flew up and struck Zedník directly on the side of the neck, hitting Zedník's external carotid artery. Clutching his neck, Zedník raced to the Florida bench, leaving a long trail of blood along the way, and nearly falling into the arms of a team trainer. He fully recovered from the injury. Neck guards have been mandatory for all players in Sweden following the 1996 death of Bengt Åkerblom in a similar accident.

On October 28, 2023, Nottingham Panthers forward Adam Johnson was fatally injured in a game against the Sheffield Steelers when his neck was cut by the skate of Steelers player Matt Petgrave. He was not wearing a neck guard when the injury occurred. Johnson's death served as a catalyst for more professional players adopting neck guards, and for use mandates being implemented across various leagues internationally.

=== Use mandates ===
Following the death of Adam Johnson, the English Ice Hockey Association introduced a neck guard mandate beginning January 1, 2024. The Elite Ice Hockey League, for which Johnson played, opted to issue a "strong recommendation" for neck guards but not require their use. The Western Hockey League of the Canadian Hockey League (CHL) began requiring neck guards in November 2023; the Ontario Hockey League and Quebec Maritimes Junior Hockey League of the CHL had already required them. The American Hockey League and the International Ice Hockey Federation also began requiring neck guards in the wake of Johnson's death.

On January 28, 2024, USA Hockey placed a mandate that went into effect on August 1, 2024, requiring that all players and on-ice officials under the age of 18 wear neck laceration protection that is "commercially designed and manufactured for that purpose." USA Hockey strongly recommends adult players use neck guards.

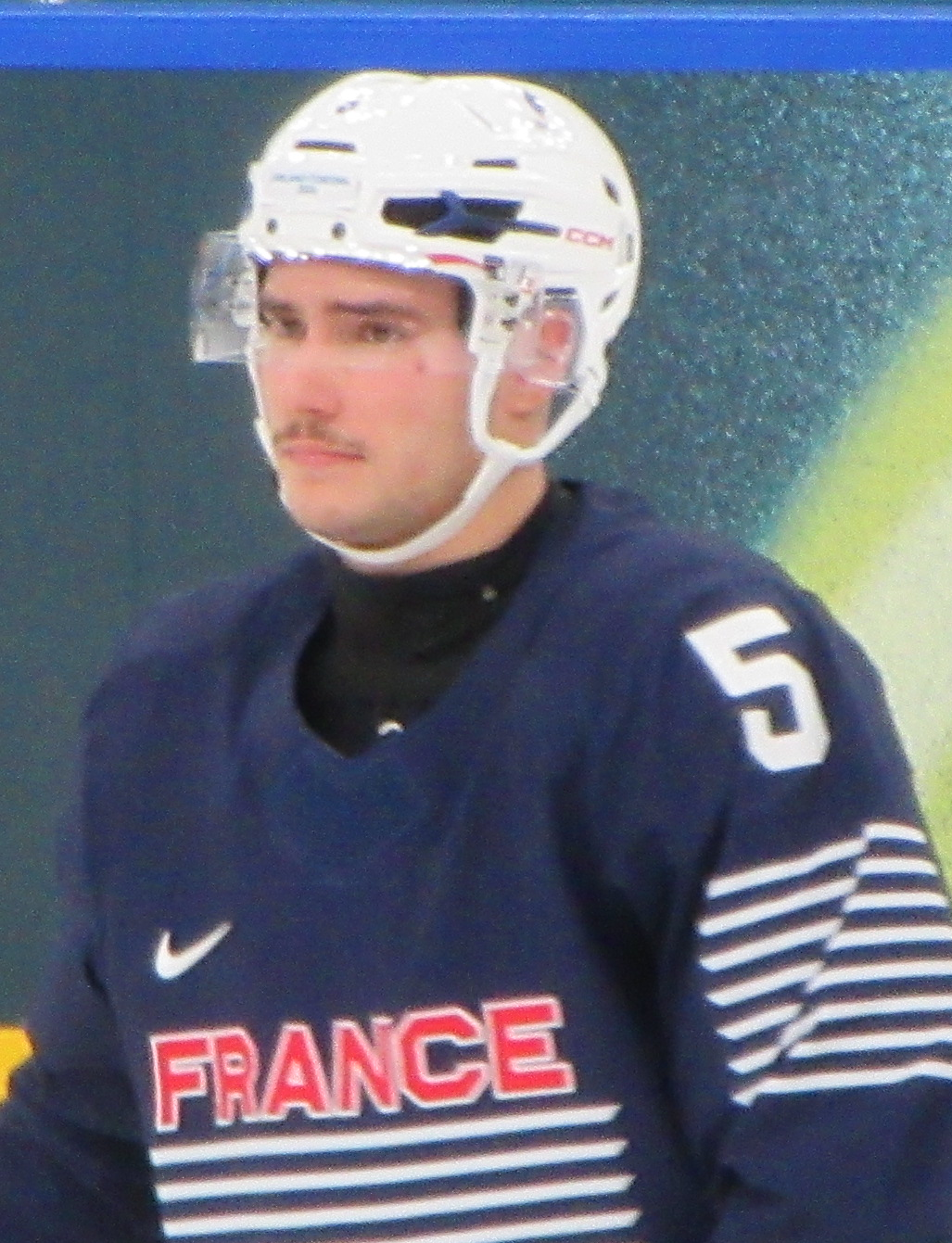
Enzo Guebey wearing a neck guard at the 2026 Winter Olympics

During the 2026 Winter Olympics, all ice hockey players were required to wear neck guards during competition; it was the first time they were required for the Olympics. As of the 2025–2026 season, the Professional Women's Hockey League (PWHL) recommends, but does not require, neck and throat protection. Beginning in the 2026–2027 season, new National Hockey League (NHL) players will be required to wear neck guards. Players who have played in at least one game prior to the 2026–2027 season will be grandfathered in and will not be required to wear a neck guard. As of 2025, only about 8% of NHL players wore a neck guard.
