= Mikael Westling =

Swedish ice hockey player

- Born: 10 June 1964 (age 62)
- Played for: Djurgården

Mikael Westling (born 10 June 1964) is a retired Swedish ice hockey player. Westling was part of the Djurgården Swedish champions' team of 1983.
