= Magnus Zirath =

Swedish ice hockey player

- Born: 16 February 1981 (age 45)
- Height: 178 cm (5 ft 10 in)
- Weight: 86 kg (190 lb; 13 st 8 lb)
- Position: Goaltender
- Caught: Left
- Played for: Djurgårdens IF
- Playing career: 1997–2008
Medal record
IIHF World U18 Championship
Silver medal – second place	1999 Germany	Team

Magnus Zirath (born 16 February 1981) is a retired Swedish ice hockey goaltender. Zirath played for Djurgårdens IF in the Swedish Hockey League, during the 1999–2000 season, in which the team was Swedish ice hockey champions. Zirath made one appearance for Sweden's Under-18 national team in the 1999 IIHF World U18 Championships.

== Career ==
Zirath started playing youth hockey with IFK Tumba and played for Huddinge IK in J20 SuperElit. In February 2000, Zirath joined Djurgårdens IF.
