= Alexander Falk =

Swedish ice hockey defenceman

- Born: May 24, 1993 (age 32) Stockholm, Sweden
- Height: 5 ft 11 in (180 cm)
- Weight: 187 lb (85 kg; 13 st 5 lb)
- Position: Defence
- Shoots: Left
- Allsv team Former teams: Djurgårdens IF; Timrå IK
- Playing career: 2012–present

Alexander Falk (born May 24, 1993) is a Swedish professional ice hockey defenceman. He is currently playing with Djurgårdens IF of the HockeyAllsvenskan (Allsv).

Falk made his Elitserien debut playing with Djurgårdens during the 2011–12 Elitserien season.

== Career statistics ==
			Regular season					Playoffs
Season	Team	League	GP	G	A	Pts	PIM	GP	G	A	Pts	PIM
2008–09	SDE HF J18	J18 Elit	34	6	12	18	12	—	—	—	—	—
2009–10	SDE HF J18	J18 Elit	21	6	10	16	6	—	—	—	—	—
2009–10	SDE HF J18	J18 Allsvenskan	15	1	5	6	10	—	—	—	—	—
2010–11	Djurgårdens IF J18	J18 Elit	17	6	9	15	10	—	—	—	—	—
2010–11	Djurgårdens IF J18	J18 Allsvenskan	6	0	1	1	4	5	0	2	2	4
2010–11	Djurgårdens IF J20	J20 SuperElit	20	1	2	3	0	3	1	0	1	2
2011–12	Djurgårdens IF J20	J20 SuperElit	42	2	7	9	18	3	0	0	0	2
2011–12	Djurgårdens IF	Elitserien	1	0	0	0	0	—	—	—	—	—
2012–13	Djurgårdens IF J20	J20 SuperElit	25	4	9	13	46	2	0	0	0	4
2012–13	Djurgårdens IF	HockeyAllsvenskan	22	1	0	1	4	4	0	0	0	2
2013–14	Djurgårdens IF	HockeyAllsvenskan	44	2	2	4	22	9	0	2	2	0
2014–15	Djurgårdens IF	SHL	43	1	3	4	22	2	0	0	0	2
2015–16	Djurgårdens IF	SHL	46	0	3	3	20	8	0	0	0	12
2016–17	Djurgårdens IF	SHL	42	0	4	4	45	3	0	0	0	0
2017–18	Djurgårdens IF	SHL	50	2	6	8	12	11	0	0	0	12
2018–19	Timrå IK	SHL	41	2	5	7	26	—	—	—	—	—
2019–20	Södertälje SK J20	J20 SuperElit	1	0	1	1	0	—	—	—	—	—
2019–20	Södertälje SK	HockeyAllsvenskan	17	1	1	2	16	1	0	0	0	0
2020–21	Södertälje SK	HockeyAllsvenskan	50	1	8	9	73	3	0	0	0	0
2021–22	HC Vita Hästen	HockeyAllsvenskan	51	2	6	8	64	—	—	—	—	—
2022–23	Djurgårdens IF	HockeyAllsvenskan	25	1	0	1	10	3	0	0	0	0
SHL (Elitserien) totals			223	5	21	26	125	24	0	0	0	26
HockeyAllsvenskan totals			209	8	17	25	189	20	0	2	2	2
