= Markus Matthiasson =

Swedish ice hockey player

- Born: November 16, 1975 (age 49); Uppsala, Sweden
- Height: 6 ft 0 in (183 cm)
- Weight: 205 lb (93 kg; 14 st 9 lb)
- Position: Winger
- Shoots: Left
- EBHL team Former teams: Black Wings Linz; Djurgården; Timrå; Malmö Redhawks; Acroni Jesenice
- Playing career: 1992–present

Markus Matthiasson (born 16 November 1975) is a Swedish ice hockey winger currently playing for Black Wings Linz of the Austrian Hockey League.

Matthiasson began his career in 1992, playing in Division 1 with Almtuna, based in his hometown of Uppsala. He spent four seasons with them until moving to another Division 1 side Timrå. In 1997, he moved up to the Elitserien by joining Djurgården. After a disappointing season he moved back to Division 1 with Huddinge and in 1999 he returned to Timrå, guiding them to promotion from the Allsvenskan to the Elitserien. He stayed until 2004 when he joined the Malmö Redhawks where they were relegated to HockeyAllsvenkan. They won promotion back to Elitserien after just one season in 2005–06 where Matthiasson led them in points with 40 (20 G and 20 A). 2006–07 was a huge disappointment to Matthiasson as he followed his stellar performance in the last season with just 8 goals in 55 games as Malmö were relegated again. In 2007, Matthiasson joined Slovenian side Acroni Jesenice, who play in Austria. He was second in points with 32 behind fellow Swede Conny Strömberg.
