= Claes Norström =

Swedish ice hockey player

- Born: 4 April 1959 (age 67)
- Played for: Djurgården

Claes Norström (born 4 April 1959) is a retired Swedish ice hockey player. Norström was part of the Djurgården Swedish champions' team of 1989. Norström made 91 Elitserien appearances for Djurgården.
