= Bertz Zetterberg =

Swedish ice hockey player

- Born: November 23, 1930 Stockholm, Sweden
- Died: 2 April 2011 (aged 80)
- Position: Defence
- Played for: Djurgården
- National team: Sweden
- Playing career: 1949–1958

Bertz Erik Olov Zetterberg (23 November 1930 – 2 April 2011) was a Swedish Olympic ice hockey player, who was part of the Sweden team that finished 4th at the 1956 Winter Olympics. Zetterberg was part of the Djurgården Swedish champions' team of 1950, 1954, 1955, and 1958.
