= Peter Wallén =

Swedish ice hockey player

- Born: 26 February 1965 (age 61) Gustavsberg, Värmdö
- Height: 181 cm (5 ft 11 in)
- Weight: 83 kg (183 lb; 13 st 1 lb)
- Position: Forward
- Played for: Djurgården
- Playing career: 1979–1998

Peter Wallén (born 26 February 1965) is a retired Swedish ice hockey player. Wallén was part of the Djurgården Swedish champions' team of 1989. Wallén made 25 Elitserien appearances for Djurgården.
