= Bo Larsson (ice hockey) =

Swedish ice hockey player

- Born: 13 March 1956 (age 69); Sweden
- Height: 175 cm (5 ft 9 in)
- Weight: 75 kg (165 lb; 11 st 11 lb)
- Position: Goaltender
- Played for: Djurgården; Hammarby IF
- Playing career: 1977–1985

Bo Larsson (born 13 March 1956) is a retired Swedish ice hockey player. Larsson was part of the Djurgården Swedish champions' team of 1983. Larsson made 13 Elitserien appearances for Djurgården.
