= Kurt Thulin =

Swedish ice hockey player

- Born: 8 August 1939 (age 87)
- Played for: Djurgården

Kurt Thulin (born 8 August 1939) is a retired Swedish ice hockey player. Thulin was part of the Djurgården Swedish champions' team of 1959, 1960, 1962, and 1963.
