= Kurt Svensson (ice hockey) =

Swedish ice hockey player

- Born: 1940 (age 85–86) Stockholm, Sweden
- Position: Forward
- Played for: Djurgården
- Playing career: 1959–1965

Kurt Svensson (born 1940) is a Swedish retired ice hockey player. Svensson was part of the Djurgården Swedish champions' team of 1963.
