= Bengt Bornström =

Swedish ice hockey player (1934–2007)

- Born: 6 June 1934
- Died: 2007 (aged 72–73)
- Played for: Djurgården
- Playing career: 1948–1968

Bengt Bornström (6 June 1934 – 2007) was a Swedish ice hockey player. Bornström was part of the Djurgården Swedish champions' team of 1958.
