= Arne Boman =

Swedish ice hockey player (1931–2025)

- Born: 15 February 1931
- Died: 21 October 2025 (aged 94)
- Played for: Djurgården
- Playing career: 1957–1958

Arne Boman (15 February 1931 – 21 October 2025) was a Swedish ice hockey player. He was part of the Djurgården Swedish champions' team of 1958. Boman died on 21 October 2025, at the age of 94.
