= Jörgen Holmberg =

Swedish ice hockey player (born 1962)

- Born: 27 June 1962 (age 64)
- Played for: Djurgården

Jörgen Holmberg (born 27 June 1962) is a retired Swedish ice hockey player. Holmberg was part of the Djurgården Swedish champions' team of 1983. Holmberg made 114 Elitserien appearances for Djurgården.
