= Sven Andersson (ice hockey) =

Swedish ice hockey player

- Born: 6 November 1932 (age 93)
- Position: Defense
- Played for: Djurgården

Sven Andersson (born 6 November 1932) is a retired Swedish ice hockey player. Andersson was part of the Djurgården Swedish champions' team of 1954.
