= Erik Lindgren (ice hockey) =

Swedish ice hockey player and bandy player

- Born: 20 December 1902 Stockholm
- Died: 23 July 1973 (aged 70)
- Position: D
- Played for: Djurgården
- National team: Sweden
- Playing career: 1925–1934

Erik Lindgren (20 December 1902 – 23 July 1973) was a Swedish international ice hockey defender and bandy player. He represented Sweden men's national ice hockey team in the 1931 World Ice Hockey Championships.

== Career ==
Born in Stockholm, Lindgren represented Djurgården between 1925 and 1934. He became Swedish champion in 1926. 1934–35, he played for IK Göta.

Lindgren played with Djurgårdens IF Bandy 1930–32.
