= Patrik Nilson =

Swedish ice hockey player

- Born: 18 May 1981 (age 45)
- Played for: Djurgården

Patrik Nilson (born 18 May 1981) is a retired Swedish ice hockey player. Nilson was part of the Djurgården Swedish champions' team of 2000 and 2001. Nilson made 38 Elitserien appearances for Djurgården.
