= Mikael Good =

Swedish ice hockey player

- Born: 14 March 1962 (age 64)
- Played for: Djurgården

Mikael Good (born 14 March 1962) is a retired Swedish ice hockey player. Good was part of the Djurgården Swedish champions' team of 1983. Good made 14 Elitserien appearances for Djurgården.
