= Magnus Jansson (ice hockey) =

Swedish ice hockey player

- Born: 16 November 1969 (age 55); Sweden
- Height: 176 cm (5 ft 9 in)
- Weight: 80 kg (176 lb; 12 st 8 lb)
- Position: Forward
- Played for: Djurgården; Södertälje SK
- Playing career: 1987–2003

Magnus Jansson (born 16 November 1969) is a retired Swedish ice hockey player. Jansson was part of the Djurgården Swedish champions' team of 1991. Jansson made 215 Elitserien appearances for Djurgården.
