= Torsten Magnusson (ice hockey) =

Swedish ice hockey player

Torsten Rudolf Vilhelm Magnusson
- Born: April 9, 1933 Sweden
- Died: September 13, 2015
- Position: Forward
- Played for: Djurgården
- Playing career: c.1954–c.1962

Torsten Magnusson (born 9 April 1933) was a Swedish ice hockey player. Magnusson was part of the Djurgården's champions team of 1954.
