= Tommy Björkman =

Swedish ice hockey player (1934–2022)

- Born: 16 June 1934
- Died: 18 July 2022 (aged 88)
- Played for: Djurgården

Tommy Björkman (16 June 1934 – 18 July 2022) was a Swedish ice hockey goaltender. Björkman was part of the Djurgården Swedish champions' team of 1958, 1959, 1960, 1961, 1962, and 1963.
