= Karl-Erik Lilja =

Swedish ice hockey player

- Born: April 24, 1957 (age 68)
- Height: 6 ft 0 in (183 cm)
- Weight: 176 lb (80 kg; 12 st 8 lb)
- Position: Defense
- Shot: Right
- Played for: Hammarby IF; Södertälje SK; Djurgårdens IF
- Playing career: 1976–1990

Karl-Erik Lilja (born April 24, 1957) is a retired Swedish ice hockey player. Lilja began playing hockey in Hammarby IF's youth organisation but moved to Södertälje SK in 1976 to play in the Swedish Elitserien. After two seasons in Södertälje, he returned to his first club for one season. The team reached the playoff to Elitserien, but lost in the first round against Timrå IK. The following season, Lilja moved to Djurgårdens IF where he would spend the rest of his playing career. In 1983 he won the Swedish championship with Djurgården, and became team captain in 1986. He kept the title until 1988. During his two last seasons in Djurgården, he won two Swedish championships.

Karl-Erik Lilja
Medal record

Men's ice hockey

Elitserien
| Gold medal – first place | 1990 | Team |
| Gold medal – first place | 1989 | Team |
| Gold medal – first place | 1983 | Team |

== Career statistics ==
| | | | Regular Season | | | | | Playoffs |
| Season | Team | League | GP | G | A | Pts | PIM | GP | G | A | Pts | PIM |
|---|---|---|---|---|---|---|---|---|---|---|---|---|
| 1976–77 | Södertälje SK | Elitserien | 35 | 6 | 6 | 12 | 4 | — | — | — | — | — |
| 1977–78 | Södertälje SK | Elitserien | 35 | 7 | 1 | 8 | 26 | — | — | — | — | — |
| 1978–79 | Hammarby IF | Division 1 | 35 | 12 | 8 | 20 | 44 | — | — | — | — | — |
| 1978–79 | Hammarby IF | Kvalserien | 2 | 1 | 1 | 2 | 2 | — | — | — | — | — |
| 1979–80 | Djurgårdens IF | Elitserien | 20 | 3 | 2 | 5 | 10 | — | — | — | — | — |
| 1980–81 | Djurgårdens IF | Elitserien | 32 | 5 | 10 | 15 | 32 | — | — | — | — | — |
| 1981–82 | Djurgårdens IF | Elitserien | 18 | 4 | 1 | 5 | 26 | — | — | — | — | — |
| 1981–82 | Djurgårdens IF | Kvalserien | 6 | 2 | 2 | 4 | 2 | — | — | — | — | — |
| 1982–83 | Djurgårdens IF | Elitserien | 31 | 4 | 10 | 14 | 18 | 8 | 1 | 2 | 3 | 6 |
| 1983–84 | Djurgårdens IF | Elitserien | 35 | 10 | 7 | 17 | 24 | 6 | 1 | 0 | 1 | 6 |
| 1984–85 | Djurgårdens IF | Elitserien | 35 | 6 | 11 | 17 | 12 | 5 | 1 | 2 | 3 | 2 |
| 1985–86 | Djurgårdens IF | Elitserien | 28 | 4 | 7 | 11 | 14 | — | — | — | — | — |
| 1986–87 | Djurgårdens IF | Elitserien | 35 | 4 | 14 | 18 | 28 | 2 | 0 | 1 | 1 | 0 |
| 1987–88 | Djurgårdens IF | Elitserien | 37 | 4 | 9 | 13 | 24 | 3 | 2 | 1 | 3 | 2 |
| 1988–89 | Djurgårdens IF | Elitserien | 12 | 3 | 2 | 5 | 14 | 5 | 1 | 2 | 3 | 4 |
| 1989–90 | Djurgårdens IF | Elitserien | 17 | 1 | 2 | 3 | 10 | 7 | 0 | 1 | 1 | 8 |
