= Jan Claesson =

Swedish ice hockey player

- Born: 18 January 1958 (age 67)
- Height: 6 ft 2 in (188 cm)
- Weight: 198 lb (90 kg; 14 st 2 lb)
- Position: Forward
- Shot: Left
- Played for: Almtuna IS; Djurgårdens IF; Södertälje SK; Uppsala AIS; Sparta Warriors
- National team: Sweden
- Playing career: 1976–1992

Jan Claesson (born 18 January 1958) is a retired Swedish ice hockey player. Claesson was part of the Djurgården Swedish champions' team of 1983. Claesson made 117 Elitserien appearances for Djurgården.

== Career statistics ==
=== Regular season and playoffs ===
			Regular season					Playoffs
Season	Team	League	GP	G	A	Pts	PIM	GP	G	A	Pts	PIM
1976–77	Almtuna IS	SWE II	24	4	4	8	—	—	—	—	—	—
1977–78	Almtuna IS	SWE II	34	11	8	19	31	—	—	—	—	—
1978–79	Almtuna IS	SWE II	36	22	12	34	40	—	—	—	—	—
1979–80	Almtuna IS	SWE II	30	18	8	26	28	—	—	—	—	—
1980–81	Almtuna IS	SWE II	36	30	29	59	44	—	—	—	—	—
1981–82	Djurgårdens IF	SEL	32	4	3	7	14	—	—	—	—	—
1982–83	Djurgårdens IF	SEL	28	10	5	15	18	8	1	2	3	8
1983–84	Djurgårdens IF	SEL	25	9	8	17	20	6	3	2	5	4
1984–85	Djurgårdens IF	SEL	32	7	19	26	22	8	2	3	5	10
1985–86	Södertälje SK	SEL	29	3	8	11	26	7	2	1	3	4
1987–88	Uppsala AIS	SWE II	29	16	13	29	72	—	—	—	—	—
1988–89	Uppsala AIS	SWE II	31	20	19	39	60	—	—	—	—	—
1989–90	Sparta Warriors	NOR	30	19	23	42	—	—	—	—	—	—
1990–91	Sparta Warriors	NOR	30	21	27	48	—	—	—	—	—	—
1991–92	Uppsala AIS	SWE II	33	12	27	39	54	—	—	—	—	—
SWE II totals			254	133	120	253	329	—	—	—	—	—
SEL totals			146	33	43	76	100	29	8	8	16	26

=== International ===
Year	Team	Event	GP	G	A	Pts	PIM
1984	Sweden	CC	6	0	2	2	6
