= Stig Sjöstam =

Swedish ice hockey player (1935–2004)

- Born: 23 March 1935
- Died: 26 March 2004 (aged 69)
- Played for: Djurgården

Stig Sjöstam (23 March 1935 – 26 August 2004) was a Swedish ice hockey player. Sjöstam was part of the Djurgården Swedish champions' team of 1955. He died on 26 March 2004, at the age of 69.
