= Lars Hallström (ice hockey) =

Swedish ice hockey player

- Born: 23 January 1976 (age 49); Stockholm, Sweden
- Height: 185 cm (6 ft 1 in)
- Weight: 95 kg (209 lb; 14 st 13 lb)
- Position: Left wing
- Shot: Left
- Played for: Djurgården
- Playing career: 1994–2001

Lars Hallström (born 23 January 1976) is a retired Swedish ice hockey player. Hallström was part of the Djurgården Swedish champions' team of 2000. Hallström made 125 Elitserien appearances for Djurgården.
