= Mikael Magnusson =

Swedish ice hockey player

- Born: 15 March 1973 (age 53)
- Played for: Djurgården

Mikael Magnusson (born 15 March 1973) is a retired Swedish ice hockey player. Magnusson was part of the Djurgården Swedish champions' team of 2000 and 2001. Magnusson made 458 Elitserien appearances for Djurgården.
