= Ernst Karlberg =

Swedish ice hockey player

- Born: 12 October 1901
- Died: 20 March 1987 (aged 85)
- Played for: Djurgården
- National team: Sweden
Medal record
Men's Ice hockey
Silver medal – second place	1928 St. Moritz	Team Competition

Ernst Wilhelm Ludvig Karlberg (12 October 1901 – 20 March 1987) was a Swedish ice hockey player who competed in the 1924 Winter Olympics and in the 1928 Winter Olympics.

In 1924 he finished fourth with the Swedish team in the first Winter Olympics ice hockey tournament.

Four years later he was a member of the Swedish ice hockey team, which won the silver medal.

Karlberg was part of the Djurgården Swedish champions' team of 1926.
