= Joakim Persson (ice hockey) =

Swedish ice hockey player

- Born: 4 May 1970 (age 54); Upplands Väsby, Sweden
- Height: 180 cm (5 ft 11 in)
- Weight: 81 kg (179 lb; 12 st 11 lb)
- Position: Goaltender
- Caught: Left
- Played for: Djurgården; AIK IF; VIK Västerås HK
- NHL draft: 259th overall, 1993; Boston Bruins
- Playing career: 1987–2004

Joakim Persson (born 4 May 1970) is a retired Swedish ice hockey player. Persson was part of the Djurgården Swedish champions' team of 1991. Persson made 3 Elitserien appearances for Djurgården.
