= Pontus Molander =

Swedish ice hockey player

- Born: 13 March 1964 (age 62)
- Played for: Djurgården

Pontus Molander (born 13 March 1964) is a retired Swedish ice hockey player. Molander was part of the Djurgården Swedish champions' team of 1983. Molander made 67 Elitserien appearances for Djurgården.
