= Ruben Allinger =

Swedish ice hockey player

- Born: 23 December 1891; Uppsala, Sweden
- Died: 9 January 1979 (aged 87)
- Played for: Djurgården
- National team: Sweden

Karl Ruben Allinger (23 December 1891 – 9 January 1979) was a Swedish ice hockey player who competed in the 1924 Winter Olympics.

In 1924 he was a member of the Swedish ice hockey team which finished fourth in the Olympic ice hockey tournament.

Allinger was part of the Djurgården Swedish champions' team of 1926.
