= Ola Andersson (ice hockey) =

Swedish ice hockey player (born 1962)

- Born: 24 November 1962 (age 62); Sweden
- Height: 175 cm (5 ft 9 in)
- Weight: 81 kg (179 lb; 12 st 11 lb)
- Position: Forward
- Played for: Djurgården; Södertälje SK
- Playing career: 1981–1993

Ola Andersson (born 24 November 1962) is a retired Swedish ice hockey player. Andersson was part of the Djurgården Swedish champions' team of 1989. Andersson made 50 Elitserien appearances for Djurgården.
