= Anders Johnson (ice hockey) =

Swedish ice hockey player

- Born: 18 July 1962 (age 62); Sweden
- Height: 174 cm (5 ft 9 in)
- Weight: 77 kg (170 lb; 12 st 2 lb)
- Position: Forward
- Shot: Left
- Played for: Hammarby IF; Djurgården; AIK IF
- Playing career: 1979–1998

Anders Johnson (born 18 July 1962) is a retired Swedish ice hockey player. Johnson was part of the Djurgården Swedish champions' team of 1989, 1990, and 1991. Johnson made 278 Elitserien appearances for Djurgården.
