= Johan Lindstedt =

Swedish ice hockey player

- Born: 28 January 1972 (age 54)
- Played for: Djurgården

Johan Lindstedt (born 28 January 1972) is a retired Swedish ice hockey player. Lindstedt was part of the Djurgården Swedish champions' team of 1991. Lindstedt made 48 Elitserien appearances for Djurgården.
