= Tord Nänzén =

Swedish ice hockey player (born 1954)

- Born: 23 August 1954 (age 70)
- Played for: Djurgården

Tord Nänzén (born 23 August 1954) is a retired Swedish ice hockey player. Nänzén was born in Timra, Sweden and was part of the Djurgården Swedish champions' team of 1983. Nänzén made 247 Elitserien appearances for Djurgården.
