= Hans Stergel =

Swedish ice hockey player

- Born: 26 May 1943 (age 83)
- Played for: Djurgården

Hans Stergel (born 26 May 1943) is a retired Swedish ice hockey player. Stergel was part of the Djurgården Swedish champions' team of 1963.
