= Rolf Berggren =

Swedish ice hockey player

- Born: 26 November 1934
- Died: 2007 (aged 72–73)
- Played for: Djurgården

Rolf Berggren (born 26 November 1934 – 2007) was a Swedish ice hockey player. Berggren was part of the Djurgården Swedish champions' team of 1958, 1959, 1960, and 1961.
