= François Bouchard (ice hockey, born 1973) =

Canadian ice hockey player

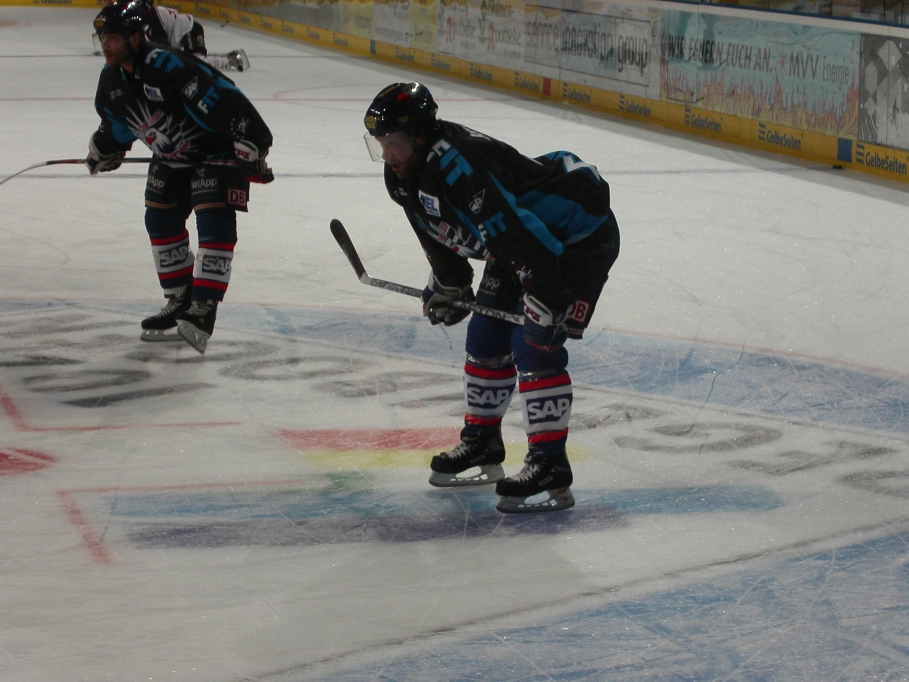
- Born: August 8, 1973 (age 52) Brossard, Québec, Canada
- Height: 180 cm (5 ft 11 in)
- Weight: 85 kg (187 lb; 13 st 5 lb)
- Position: Defence
- Shot: Left
- Played for: Charlotte Checkers; Oulun Kärpät; HPK; Augsburger Panther; Modo Hockey; Djurgårdens IF; St. John's Maple Leafs; ERC Ingolstadt; Frankfurt Lions; Adler Mannheim; Vienna Capitals
- NHL draft: 1994 NHL Supplemental Draft; Tampa Bay Lightning
- Playing career: 1991–2011

François Bouchard (born August 8, 1973) is a Canadian former professional ice hockey player. In 2001, he was Swedish ice hockey champion with Djurgårdens IF and in 2004, he was German ice hockey champion with Frankfurt Lions.
