= Mats Ytter =

Swedish ice hockey player

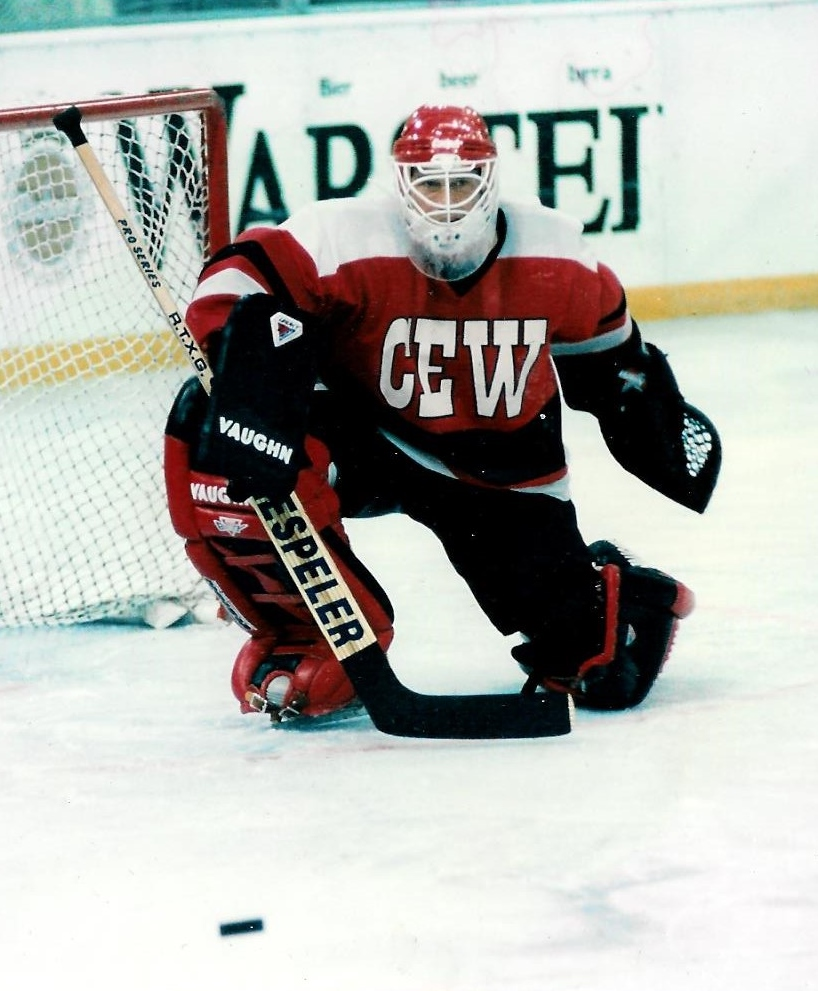
- Born: 23 July 1963 (age 63)
- Played for: Djurgården

Mats Ytter (born 23 July 1963) is a retired Swedish ice hockey player. Ytter was part of the Djurgården Swedish champions' team of 1989. Ytter made 21 Elitserien appearances for Djurgården.
