= Per Nygårds =

Swedish ice hockey player

- Born: 22 December 1965 (age 60)
- Played for: Djurgården

Per Nygårds (born 22 December 1965) is a retired Swedish ice hockey player. Nygårds was part of the Djurgården Swedish champions' team of 1991. Nygårds made 67 Elitserien appearances for Djurgården.
