= Mikko Konttila =

Finnish ice hockey player (born 1972)

- Born: 18 April 1972 (age 54)
- Played for: Djurgården

Mikko Konttila (born 18 April 1972) is a retired Finnish ice hockey player. Konttila was part of the Djurgården Swedish champions' team of 2000. Konttila made 45 Elitserien appearances for Djurgården.
