= Edvin Frylén =

Swedish ice hockey player

- Born: 23 December 1975 (age 49); Solna, Sweden
- Height: 187 cm (6 ft 2 in)
- Weight: 100 kg (220 lb; 15 st 10 lb)
- Position: Defense
- Shot: Left
- Played for: Västerås IK; Linköpings HC; Djurgården; Hannover Scorpions; Malmö Redhawks
- National team: Sweden
- NHL draft: 120th overall, 1994; St. Louis Blues
- Playing career: 1991–2008

Edvin Frylén (born 23 December 1975) is a retired Swedish ice hockey player. Frylén was part of the Djurgården Swedish champions' team of 2001. Frylén made 140 Elitserien appearances for Djurgården.

== Career statistics ==
			Regular season					Playoffs
Season	Team	League	GP	G	A	Pts	PIM	GP	G	A	Pts	PIM
1990–91	Järfälla HC	Division 2	16	5	3	8	16	—	—	—	—	—
1991–92	Västerås IK J20	Juniorserien	—	—	—	—	—	—	—	—	—	—
1991–92	Västerås IK	SHL	2	0	0	0	0	—	—	—	—	—
1992–93	Västerås IK J20	JuniorAllsvenskan	5	2	0	2	29	—	—	—	—	—
1992–93	Västerås IK	SHL	29	0	2	2	14	3	0	0	0	0
1993–94	Västerås IK J20	JuniorAllsvenskan	5	2	1	3	4	—	—	—	—	—
1993–94	Västerås IK	SHL	32	1	0	1	26	4	0	0	0	0
1994–95	Västerås IK J20	J20 SuperElit	11	7	5	12	8	—	—	—	—	—
1994–95	Västerås IK	SHL	25	2	1	3	14	4	0	0	0	0
1994–95	Avesta BK	Division 1	9	4	2	6	20	—	—	—	—	—
1995–96	Västerås IK	SHL	39	8	5	13	16	—	—	—	—	—
1995–96	Surahammars IF	Division 1	3	3	1	4	2	—	—	—	—	—
1996–97	Västerås IK	SHL	47	8	3	11	32	10	0	1	1	4
1997–98	Västerås IK	SHL	46	4	7	11	36	—	—	—	—	—
1998–99	Västerås IK	SHL	50	6	20	26	36	10	5	0	5	18
1999–00	Linköping HC	SHL	45	10	6	16	30	4	1	2	3	29
2000–01	Djurgårdens IF	SHL	47	7	6	13	34	16	1	2	3	16
2001–02	Djurgårdens IF	SHL	48	8	4	12	44	5	0	0	0	0
2002–03	Hannover Scorpions	DEL	52	8	12	20	18	—	—	—	—	—
2003–04	Hannover Scorpions	DEL	51	6	19	25	32	—	—	—	—	—
2004–05	Hannover Scorpions	DEL	50	3	10	13	53	—	—	—	—	—
2005–06	Malmö Redhawks	Allsvenskan	37	7	26	33	38	10	2	3	5	4
2006–07	Malmö Redhawks	SHL	55	8	12	20	36	10	2	5	7	10
2007–08	Djurgårdens IF	SHL	45	3	3	6	32	5	0	0	0	2
SHL totals			510	65	69	134	350	71	9	10	19	79
