= Hans Stelius =

Swedish footballer

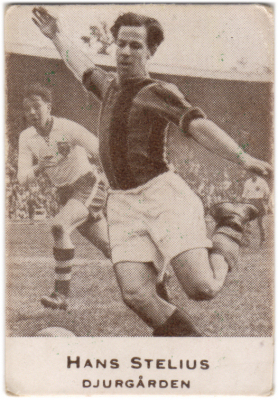

Personal information
- Full name: Hans Gustaf Vilhelm Stelius
- Date of birth: 29 March 1918
- Place of birth: Stockholm
- Date of death: 21 August 1996 (aged 78)
- Place of death: Stora Tuna

Senior career*
Years	Team	Apps	(Gls)
1939–1951	Djurgården		
- * Club domestic league appearances and goals

Hans Stelius (1918–1996) was a Swedish footballer. Stelius made 62 Allsvenskan appearances for Djurgården and scored 30 goals. He also played ice hockey for Djurgården.
