= Dag Bredberg =

Swedish ice hockey player

- Born: 21 April 1955 (age 71) Jönköping, Sweden
- Weight: 87 kg (192 lb; 13 st 10 lb)
- Position: Forward
- Shot: Left
- Played for: Färjestad BK; Djurgården
- WHA draft: 132nd overall, 1975; Winnipeg Jets
- Playing career: 1973–1988

Dag Bredberg (born 21 April 1955) is a retired Swedish ice hockey player. Bredberg was part of the Djurgården Swedish champions' team of 1983. Bredberg made 131 Elitserien appearances for Djurgården.
