= Björn Carlsson (ice hockey) =

Swedish ice hockey player

- Born: 13 January 1961 (age 64); Sweden
- Height: 193 cm (6 ft 4 in)
- Weight: 89 kg (196 lb; 14 st 0 lb)
- Position: Forward
- Shot: Left
- Played for: Djurgården; AIK IF; Södertälje SK
- Playing career: 1980–1992

Björn Carlsson (born 13 January 1961) is a retired Swedish ice hockey player. Carlsson was part of the Djurgården Swedish champions' team of 1983. Carlsson made 160 Elitserien appearances for Djurgården.
