= Eddie Wingren =

Swedish ice hockey player

- Born: 2 August 1940 (age 86)
- Played for: Djurgården

Eddie Wingren (born 2 August 1940) is a retired Swedish ice hockey player. Wingren was part of the Djurgården Swedish champions' team of 1959, 1960, 1961, 1962, and 1963.
