= Stefan Perlström =

Swedish ice hockey player

- Born: 18 May 1956 (age 69)
- Position: Defender
- Played for: Djurgården (1977–1989)

Stefan Perlström (born 18 May 1956) is a retired Swedish ice hockey player. Perlström was part of the Djurgården Swedish champions' team of 1983 and 1989. Perlström made 295 Elitserien appearances for Djurgården.
