= Peter Nilsson (ice hockey) =

Swedish ice hockey player

- Born: June 10, 1962 (age 63) Stockholm, SWE
- Height: 6 ft 0 in (183 cm)
- Weight: 183 lb (83 kg; 13 st 1 lb)
- Position: Center; Forward
- Shot: Left
- Played for: Hammarby IF; Djurgårdens IF; Södertälje SK
- NHL draft: 127th overall, 1981; Winnipeg Jets
- Playing career: 1978–1998

Peter Nilsson (born June 10, 1962) is a Swedish ice hockey player. Nilsson began playing hockey in Hammarby IF at a senior level in 1978. He joined Djurgårdens IF in 1983. During his 12 seasons for Djurgården, he played a total of 510 Elitserien games and scored 341 points before moving back to his first club Hammarby in 1995. Nilsson ended his professional career in Södertälje SK in 1998. He later played Division 3-hockey for Bajen Fans IF, a club founded by Hammarby supporters after the club's bankruptcy in 2008.

== Career statistics ==
			Regular season					Playoffs
Season	Team	League	GP	G	A	Pts	PIM	GP	G	A	Pts	PIM
1978–79	Hammarby IF	Division 1	3	0	0	0	0	—	—	—	—	—
1979–90	Hammarby IF	Division 1	28	6	6	12	12	6	1	0	1	4
1980–81	Hammarby IF	Division 1	29	22	11	33	24	11	4	3	7	4
1981–82	Hammarby IF	Division 1	12	7	8	15	12	10	2	8	10	12
1982–83	Hammarby IF	SEL	33	14	7	21	12	—	—	—	—	—
1983–84	Djurgårdens IF	SEL	34	18	13	31	12	6	0	0	0	2
1984–85	Djurgårdens IF	SEL	35	18	17	35	8	7	1	4	5	0
1985–86	Djurgårdens IF	SEL	34	13	11	24	14	—	—	—	—	—
1986–87	Djurgårdens IF	SEL	33	11	14	25	20	2	1	1	2	2
1987–88	Djurgårdens IF	SEL	39	14	32	46	22	3	0	2	2	0
1988–89	Djurgårdens IF	SEL	40	11	20	31	6	8	3	4	7	4
1989–90	Djurgårdens IF	SEL	38	4	15	19	14	8	0	3	3	6
1990–91	Djurgårdens IF	SEL	39	5	13	18	10	7	2	1	3	6
1991–92	Djurgårdens IF	SEL	36	8	14	22	20	10	1	3	4	6
1992–93	Djurgårdens IF	SEL	39	4	5	9	20	5	3	1	4	4
1993–94	Djurgårdens IF	SEL	39	15	13	28	14	5	1	1	2	0
1994–95	Djurgårdens IF	SEL	39	6	16	22	20	3	0	0	0	2
1995–96	Hammarby IF	Division 1	31	14	21	35	16	3	1	2	3	2
1996–97	Södertälje SK	SEL	45	11	15	26	18	—	—	—	—	—
1996–97	Södertälje SK	Kvalserien	10	0	6	6	6	—	—	—	—	—
1997–98	Södertälje SK	SEL	40	5	7	12	6	—	—	—	—	—
1997–98	Södertälje SK	Kvalserien	9	1	2	3	6	—	—	—	—	—
