= Ola Josefsson =

Swedish ice hockey player

Ola Josefsson (born 7 September 1967) is a retired Swedish ice hockey player. Josefsson was part of the Djurgården Swedish champions' team of 1989, 1990, and 1991. Josefsson made 273 Elitserien appearances for Djurgården.
