= Kyösti Karjalainen =

- Born: June 19, 1967 (age 59) Gävle, Sweden
- Height: 6 ft 1 in (185 cm)
- Weight: 195 lb (88 kg; 13 st 13 lb)
- Position: Right wing
- Shot: Right
- Played for: Brynäs IF; Djurgårdens IF; Augsburger Panther; Södertälje SK; MoDo; Luleå HF; Los Angeles Kings
- NHL draft: 132nd overall, 1987; Los Angeles Kings
- Playing career: 1986–2008

Kyösti Tapani Karjalainen (born June 19, 1967) is a Swedish former professional ice hockey forward. He was drafted by the Los Angeles Kings in the seventh round, 132nd overall, in the 1987 NHL entry draft. He played 28 regular-season and three playoff National Hockey League (NHL) games with the Kings in the 1991–92 season. The rest of his career, which lasted from 1986 to 2008, was mainly spent in the Swedish Hockey League (SHL).

== Career statistics ==
=== Regular season and playoffs ===
			Regular season					Playoffs
Season	Team	League	GP	G	A	Pts	PIM	GP	G	A	Pts	PIM
1986–87	Brynäs IF	SEL	11	3	2	5	0	—	—	—	—	—
1987–88	Brynäs IF	SEL	20	2	1	3	10	—	—	—	—	—
1988–89	Brynäs IF	SEL	39	20	17	37	16	5	0	1	1	4
1989–90	Brynäs IF	SEL	38	17	15	32	16	5	0	3	3	0
1990–91	Phoenix Roadrunners	IHL	70	14	35	49	10	6	2	3	5	6
1991–92	Los Angeles Kings	NHL	28	1	8	9	12	3	0	1	1	2
1991–92	Phoenix Roadrunners	IHL	43	14	22	36	30	—	—	—	—	—
1992–93	Luleå HF	SEL	39	7	5	12	42	11	0	1	1	0
1993–94	Luleå HF	SEL	36	2	5	7	8	—	—	—	—	—
1994–95	MODO	SEL	35	7	9	16	20	—	—	—	—	—
1995–96	MODO	SEL	35	6	7	13	28	8	4	3	7	12
1996–97	Timrå IK	SWE-2	32	17	26	43	22	2	0	1	1	2
1997–98	Södertälje SK	SEL	45	10	17	27	16	—	—	—	—	—
1998–99	Augsburger Panther	DEL	52	17	28	45	20	5	1	2	3	2
1999–00	Augsburger Panther	DEL	43	9	7	16	24	2	0	0	0	27
2000–01	Djurgårdens IF	SEL	48	11	10	21	28	16	6	8	14	8
2001–02	Djurgårdens IF	SEL	48	9	12	21	18	5	0	1	1	2
2002–03	Brynäs IF	SEL	43	10	12	22	26	—	—	—	—	—
2003–04	Skutskärs SK	SWE-2	28	30	21	51	30	—	—	—	—	—
2004–05	Tierps HK	SWE-2	7	7	1	8	0	—	—	—	—	—
2005–06	Tierps HK	SWE-2	26	26	29	55	34	—	—	—	—	—
2005–06	EV Zeltweg	AUT-2	22	19	33	52	48	—	—	—	—	—
2006–07	Tierp	SWE-2	37	14	41	55	50	—	—	—	—	—
2007–08	Alfta GIF	SWE-3	21	13	22	35	24	—	—	—	—	—
SEL totals			437	104	112	206	228	64	12	22	34	46
NHL totals			28	1	8	9	12	3	0	1	1	2
