= Orvar Stambert =

Swedish ice hockey player

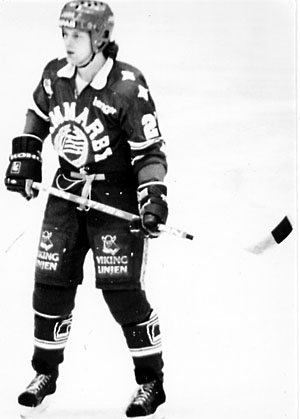
- Born: 30 September 1960 (age 64); Hagsätra, Sweden
- Height: 180 cm (5 ft 11 in)
- Weight: 88 kg (194 lb; 13 st 12 lb)
- Position: Defense
- Shot: Left
- Played for: Hammarby IF; Djurgården
- NHL draft: 165th overall, 1984; Buffalo Sabres
- Playing career: 1978–2001

Orvar Stambert (born 30 September 1960) is a retired Swedish ice hockey player. Stambert was part of the Djurgården Swedish champions' team of 1989, 1990, and 1991. Stambert made 323 Elitserien appearances for Djurgården.
