= Yngve Karlsson =

Swedish ice hockey player (1929–2016)

- Born: 10 February 1929
- Died: 7 October 2016 (aged 87)
- Played for: Djurgården

Gustaf Yngve Gunnar Karlsson (10 February 1929 – 7 October 2016) was a Swedish ice hockey player. Karlsson was part of the Djurgården Swedish champions' team of 1950, 1954, 1955, 1958, and 1962. Karlsson died on 7 October 2016, at the age of 88.
