= Gösta Westerlund =

Swedish ice hockey player

- Born: 5 February 1936
- Died: 1985 (aged 48–49)
- Played for: Djurgården

Gösta Westerlund (5 February 1936 – 1985) was a Swedish ice hockey player. Westerlund was part of the Djurgården Swedish champions' team of 1963.
