= Lars-Göran Wiklander =

Swedish ice hockey player

- Born: 19 January 1970 (age 56)
- Played for: Djurgården

Lars-Göran Wiklander (born 19 January 1970) is a retired Swedish ice hockey player. Wiklander was part of the Djurgården Swedish champions' team of 2000. Wiklander made 92 Elitserien appearances for Djurgården.
