= Bengt Åkerblom =

Swedish ice hockey player (1967–1995)

- Born: 2 May 1967 Stockholm, Sweden
- Died: 15 October 1995 (aged 28) Mora, Sweden
- Position: Centre
- Shot: Left
- Played for: Nacka HK (Swe-3); Djurgårdens IF (Elitserien); Mora IK (Swe-2)
- Playing career: 1986–1995

Bengt Ture Åkerblom (2 May 1967 – 15 October 1995) was a Swedish professional ice hockey player.

== Biography ==
Åkerblom played fifty-three games during three seasons for Djurgårdens IF Hockey in the Elitserien, in addition to seven seasons with Mora IK in the Allsvenskan.

Åkerblom is one of the few ice hockey players to have sustained a fatal injury on-ice whilst playing for their team. This happened during an exhibition game on 15 October 1995 between his team Mora IK and Brynäs IF at the FM Mattsson Arena in Mora, Sweden, when Åkerblom had his carotid arteries cut by a skate. He later died from his injuries. A requirement for all ice hockey players to wear a neck guard was introduced in Sweden on 1 January 1996.
