= Lennart Nierenburg =

Swedish ice hockey player (1927–2020)

- Born: 15 May 1927 Katarina, Stockholm, Sweden
- Died: 5 December 2020 (aged 93) Skarpnäck, Stockholm, Sweden
- Played for: Djurgården

Ansedel Lennart Israel Nierenburg (15 May 1927 – 5 December 2020) was a Swedish ice hockey player. Nierenburg was part of the Djurgården Swedish champions' team of 1950. Nierenburg died in Skarpnäck, Stockholm on 5 December 2020, at the age of 93.
