= Ove Malmberg =

Swedish ice hockey player (1933–2022)

- Born: 17 May 1933 Stockholm, Sweden
- Died: 23 June 2022 (aged 89) Huddinge, Sweden
- Position: Defence
- Shot: Right
- Played for: IK Göta; Djurgårdens IF
- National team: Sweden
- Playing career: 1953–1966

Ove Lars Gösta Malmberg (17 May 1933 – 23 June 2022) was a Swedish ice hockey defenceman and Olympian.

Malmberg played with Team Sweden at the 1956 Winter Olympics held in Cortina d'Ampezzo, Italy. He also played for Djurgårdens IF Hockey and IK Göta in the Swedish Elite League.
