= Christian Sjögren =

Swedish ice hockey player

- Born: 10 July 1978 (age 46)
- Played for: Djurgården
- Playing career: 1993–2009

Christian Sjögren (born 10 July 1978) is a retired Swedish ice hockey player. Sjögren was part of the Djurgården Swedish champions' team of 2000 and 2001. Sjögren made 66 Elitserien appearances for Djurgården.
