= Martin Holst =

Swedish ice hockey player

- Born: 26 August 1978 (age 47) Enköping, Sweden
- Height: 185 cm (6 ft 1 in)
- Weight: 91 kg (201 lb; 14 st 5 lb)
- Position: Goaltender
- Caught: Left
- Played for: Västerås IK; Djurgården
- NHL draft: Undrafted
- Playing career: 1997–2012

Martin Holst (born 26 August 1978) is a retired Swedish ice hockey player. Holst was part of the Djurgården Swedish champions' team of 2001. Holst made 7 Elitserien appearances for Djurgården.
