= Karl-Erik Andersson =

Swedish sportsperson (1927–2005)

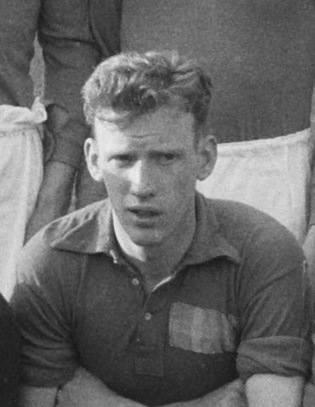
- Karl-Erik Andersson in 1952

Personal information
- Date of birth: 16 January 1927
- Date of death: 16 August 2005 (aged 78)
- Position: Defender

Youth career
- –1943: IF Ulvarna

Senior career*
Years	Team	Apps	(Gls)
1943–1957	Djurgårdens IF		

International career
1948–1954	Sweden	11	(0)
1948–1954	Sweden B	5	(0)
- * Club domestic league appearances and goals

Karl-Erik "Cacka" Andersson (16 January 1927 — 16 August 2005) was a Swedish footballer, bandy player and ice hockey player. He made 174 Allsvenskan appearances for Djurgårdens IF and scored three goals. He was also part of Sweden's squad at the 1952 Summer Olympics, but he did not play in any matches.

== Honours ==
Djurgårdens IF

- Division 2 Nordöstra: 1948–49
- Allsvenskan: 1954–55
