= Lennart Berglund =

Swedish ice hockey player

- Born: 9 May 1936 (age 90)
- Died: 2024-08-05 Solna
- Played for: Djurgården

Lennart "Baljan" Berglund, born May 09, 1936, is a retired Swedish ice hockey player. Berglund was part of the Djurgården Swedish champions' team of 1954 and 1955.
