= Jonas Finn-Olsson =

Swedish ice hockey player

- Born: 5 November 1971 (age 54)
- Played for: Djurgården

Jonas Finn-Olsson (born 5 November 1971) is a retired Swedish ice hockey player. Finn-Olsson was part of the Djurgården Swedish champions' team of 2001. Finn-Olsson made 45 Elitserien appearances for Djurgården.
