= Bengt Larsson (ice hockey) =

Swedish ice hockey player (1927–2010)

- Born: 27 January 1927 Stockholm, Sweden
- Died: 4 June 2010 (aged 83) Stockholm, Sweden
- Played for: Djurgården
- Playing career: 1948–1960

Bengt Larsson (27 January 1927 – 4 June 2010) was a Swedish ice hockey player. Larsson was part of the Djurgården Swedish champions' team of 1950, 1955, and 1958. Larsson died in Stockholm on 4 June 2010, at the age of 83.
