= Stefan Gustavson =

Swedish ice hockey player

- Born: 22 November 1965 (age 60)
- Played for: Djurgården

Stefan Gustavson (born 22 November 1965) is a retired Swedish ice hockey player. Gustavson was part of the Djurgården Swedish champions' team of 1991. Gustavson made 36 Elitserien appearances for Djurgården.
