= Håkan Andersson (ice hockey) =

Swedish amateur hockey scout

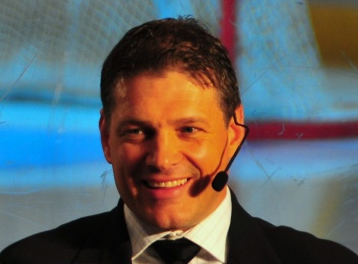
- Andersson in 2009
- Born: 19 February 1965 (age 61); Stockholm, Sweden
- Occupation: Hockey scout
- Employer: Detroit Red Wings
- Title: Director of European Scouting

Håkan Andersson (born 19 February 1965 in Stockholm, Sweden) is a Swedish amateur hockey scout who currently serves as the Director of European Scouting for the Detroit Red Wings of the National Hockey League (NHL).

Formerly a fishing guide, he was hired as a scout by the Red Wings in 1990. Since then he has won four Stanley Cup Championships as a member of the Detroit Red Wings organization, in 1997, 1998, 2002, and 2008. Andersson, based in Stockholm, Sweden, scouts all over Europe including Sweden, Finland, the Czech Republic, and Russia, and has been responsible for the Red Wings drafting Tomas Holmström, Valtteri Filppula, Jiri Hudler, Henrik Zetterberg, Pavel Datsyuk, Johan Franzén, Niklas Kronwall, Jonathan Ericsson, Gustav Nyquist, Tomáš Tatar, and many others.

His scouting and player evaluation, along with that of former Director of Amateur Scouting Joe McDonnell and former Assistant General Manager Jim Nill, has been credited by former Red Wings General Manager Ken Holland as the reason for the long-term success of the Red Wings, specifically the ability of the team to find talented players late in the draft.

== Early life ==
I was a better fishing guide than scout.

— Håkan Andersson

As a talented hockey player growing up, from the age of 10–14 he played with Charles Berglund on the IFK Tumba hockey club, and continued playing hockey until the age of 19 when, after having suffered a knee injury, he began his compulsory military service in Sweden.

Sometime after his military career was over he began working as a fishing guide with Frontiers International Travel, guiding clients such as Seymour Knox, founder of the Buffalo Sabres, around the waters of Sweden, Norway, and Argentina. After being hired as a scout by the Detroit Red Wings he kept that job part-time until the mid-1990s when scouting took over as his full-time career.

== Scouting method ==
I would say it comes down to 30 percent hard work, 30 percent good eyes, and 40 percent luck.

— Håkan Andersson, describing what it takes to have success as a scout.

Andersson, along with several other scouts who work under him, has the responsibility of monitoring every league in Europe where future NHL talent might be found. From September to April every year he watches around 200 hockey games looking for players whose skill sets indicate they could be a fit for the Detroit Red Wings system. Starting in Stockholm, he moves on to cover the rest of Sweden, then Finland, and will sometimes go as far as the Czech Republic and Russia.

The primary focus of Andersson and the rest of the Red Wings scouts is skill. They will often draft players such as Pavel Datsyuk who were overlooked by other teams due to small size when they feel the on ice ability of the player warrants it. Generally Andersson likes to watch each player two or three times, but never more than ten times; too few visits does not give a full picture of what the player can do, while too many visits can result in "picking on the player's minor weaknesses."

Once the season is over he makes a list of 65–70 players he believes could make it to the NHL. This list is merged with a similar lineup made by North American scouts to come up with a closing tally of 60 prospects that the Red Wings will seek in the NHL entry draft.

== Scouting career ==
Håkan certainly is one of the best in the business. You've just got to look at his track record. … Obviously Håkan has been an MVP behind the scenes for us.

— Ken Holland, General Manager of the Detroit Red Wings

Andersson began scouting for the Detroit Red Wings in 1990 after being recommended to the position by Christer Rockström, who was leaving the Red Wings organization to work for the New York Rangers.

While scouting in Sweden in 1993, Andersson visited the national team selection camp for players born in 1973 in order to scout players such as Peter Forsberg and Markus Näslund, and while there noticed a young Tomas Holmström. The next year Holmström caught his attention again when Holmström's coach at the time, Niklas Wikegård, described Holmström as the best player on the team. In 1994 the Red Wings for the first time gave Andersson a draft pick, their 10th round pick, meaning he had first and final say over who would be chosen by the team in that round. Andersson chose Holmström, who has since been part of four Stanley Cup winning teams in Detroit.

It was through happenstance that Andersson discovered first Pavel Datsyuk and then Henrik Zetterberg. In 1997 he went to Moscow to scout Dmitri Kalinin, noticed Datsyuk playing for the other team, and decided he needed to see more of Datsyuk. He made the trip a second time and would have come again, but the flight he and a scout from the St. Louis Blues were on was cancelled due to a storm. The Wings drafted Datsyuk 171st overall in the 1998 NHL entry draft and Andersson believes he was the only NHL scout to have seen Datsyuk play prior to the draft. The next year Andersson travelled with Jim Nill to a tournament in Finland to scout Mattias Weinhandl. Nill was distracted, however, by "this little Zetterberg guy who always seemed to have the puck." Andersson and Nill came away with a very high opinion of Zetterberg, whom they drafted 210th overall in the 1999 draft, and he has matured into a superstar in the NHL. Their decisions to go with Zetterberg and Datsyuk have paid off handsomely. The two star centers were named as finalists for the Frank J. Selke Trophy in 2008, with Datsyuk winning the award, while Zetterberg set a new franchise record for most points in a post-season (27) and won the Conn Smythe Trophy as MVP of the 2008 playoffs. In 2009 Datsyuk was named as a finalist for the Lady Byng Memorial Trophy, having already won the award three consecutive times, and was again named a finalist for the Selke, both of which he was eventually awarded. He was also a finalist for both the Hart Memorial Trophy and Lester B. Pearson Award.

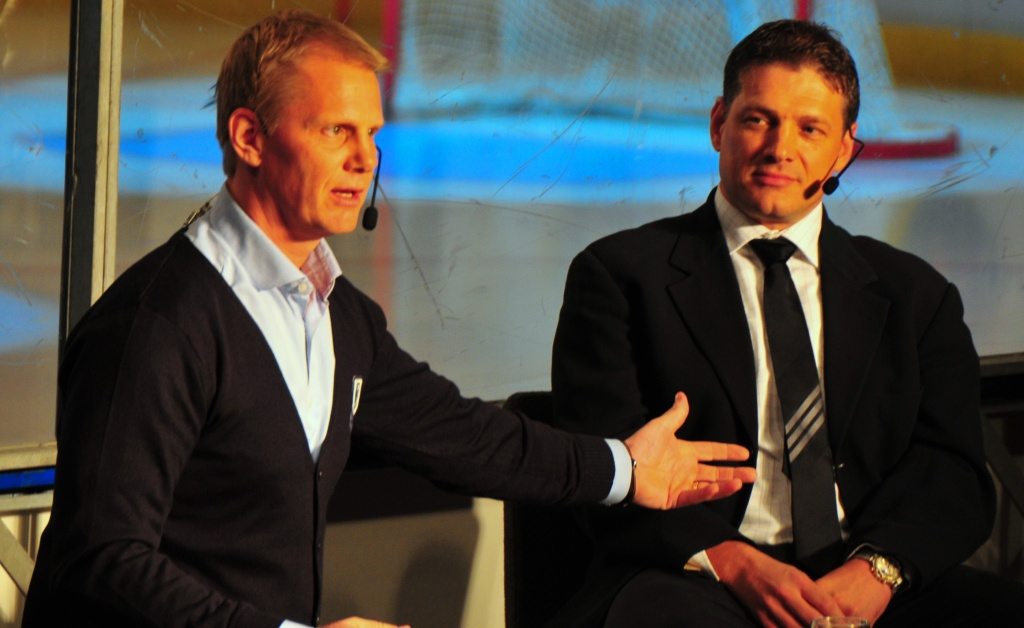
Niklas Wikegård interviewing Håkan Andersson in 2009

Andersson's good fortune in stumbling across prospects continued in 2001 when he happened to see a game in which Jonathan Ericsson, at the time a center, had been switched to defense temporarily due to injuries on his team. Ericsson had not garnered any attention from other scouts as a forward, but Andersson thought he was an excellent defender with great size and reach, and so recommended that Ericsson should move to defense permanently. The Wings subsequently drafted Ericsson with the last pick in the 2002 draft on Andersson's word of his potential as a defender, and ended up playing parts of 13 seasons with the Red Wings from 2008 to 2020.

In 2004 Andersson's luck seemed to take a hit when the Vancouver Canucks traded up to take Alexander Edler ahead of Detroit. Andersson had scouted Edler in the remote town of Östersund, where the youngster was playing in a local men's league, and due to the relative isolation of Östersund the only other NHL scout who had seen Edler play was Vancouver's Thomas Gradin. With Edler off the board, Detroit moved to the next name on their list: an unheralded 24-year-old defensive-minded Swede center named Johan Franzén. Franzén was big, had a heavy shot, with very good skating abilities for his size, and Andersson believed Franzén could at least be a good checking center. Andersson's expectations were exceeded in 2008 when, despite missing six games, Franzén set a new Red Wings franchise record by scoring 13 goals in a single post-season, a mark subsequently matched by Zetterberg.

Besides Holmström, Franzén, Datsyuk, Ericsson, and Zetterberg, Andersson has also been responsible for the selection by the Red Wings of Niklas Kronwall, Jiří Hudler, and Valtteri Filppula, among others. In 2008, the Red Wings' top five post-season scorers (Zetterberg, Datsyuk, Franzén, Kronwall, and Hudler) had all been scouted and recommended to the team by Andersson.

In December 2008 Andersson's scouting ability was recognized by The Hockey News which ranked him No. 65 on its list of 100 People of Power and Influence.

== Personal ==
Andersson and his wife live in Stockholm where they have recently started a family. In his free time he enjoys fishing, sometimes with former clients.
