= Tomas Montén =

Swedish ice hockey coach

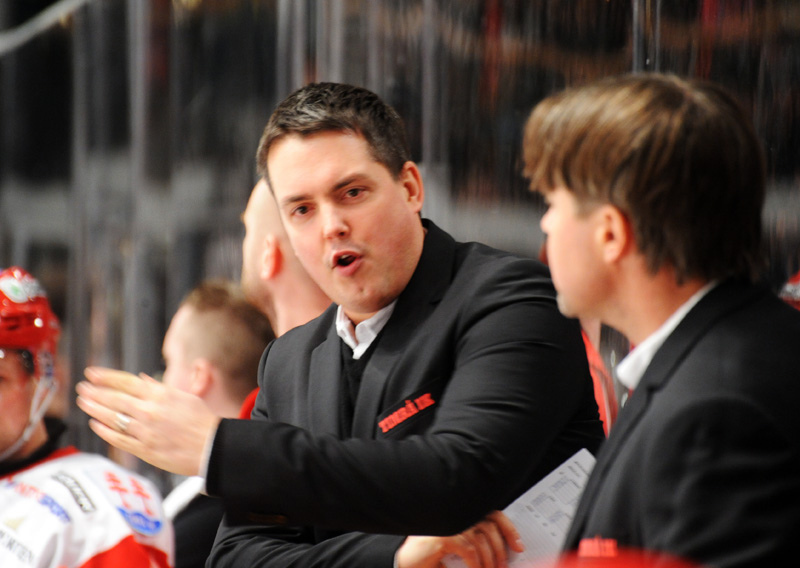
- Montén during a game, 2012
- Born: November 2, 1977 (age 48); Borlänge, Sweden
- Occupation: Ice hockey coach
- Years active: 2007–present
- Employer: Swedish Ice Hockey Association
- Known for: Head coach of Sweden men's national junior ice hockey team (2016–2022)
- Notable work: Coaching roles at Djurgårdens IF Hockey, Timrå IK, Linköping HC

Jan Tomas Montén (born 2 November 1977) is a Swedish professional ice hockey coach. He was formerly the head coach for Sweden men's national junior ice hockey team.

Montén previously shared the position as head coach for Djurgårdens IF in the Swedish Hockey League along with Mikael Johansson during the 2008–09 Elitserien season, and also worked as assistant coach in Djurgården to Hans Särkijärvi during the 2007–08 season and to Hardy Nilsson from 2009 to 2012. He moved on to coach Timrå IK during the 2012–13 Elitserien season. Timrå ended up second to last in the regular season and had to play in the 2013 Kvalserien relegation series, where the team was relegated to the second tier HockeyAllsvenskan. The following season, Montén moved on to coach in the junior organisation of Linköping HC.

Montén was named head coach for the Swedish national junior hockey team in January 2016.
