= Tomas Holmström =

Swedish ice hockey player (born 1973)

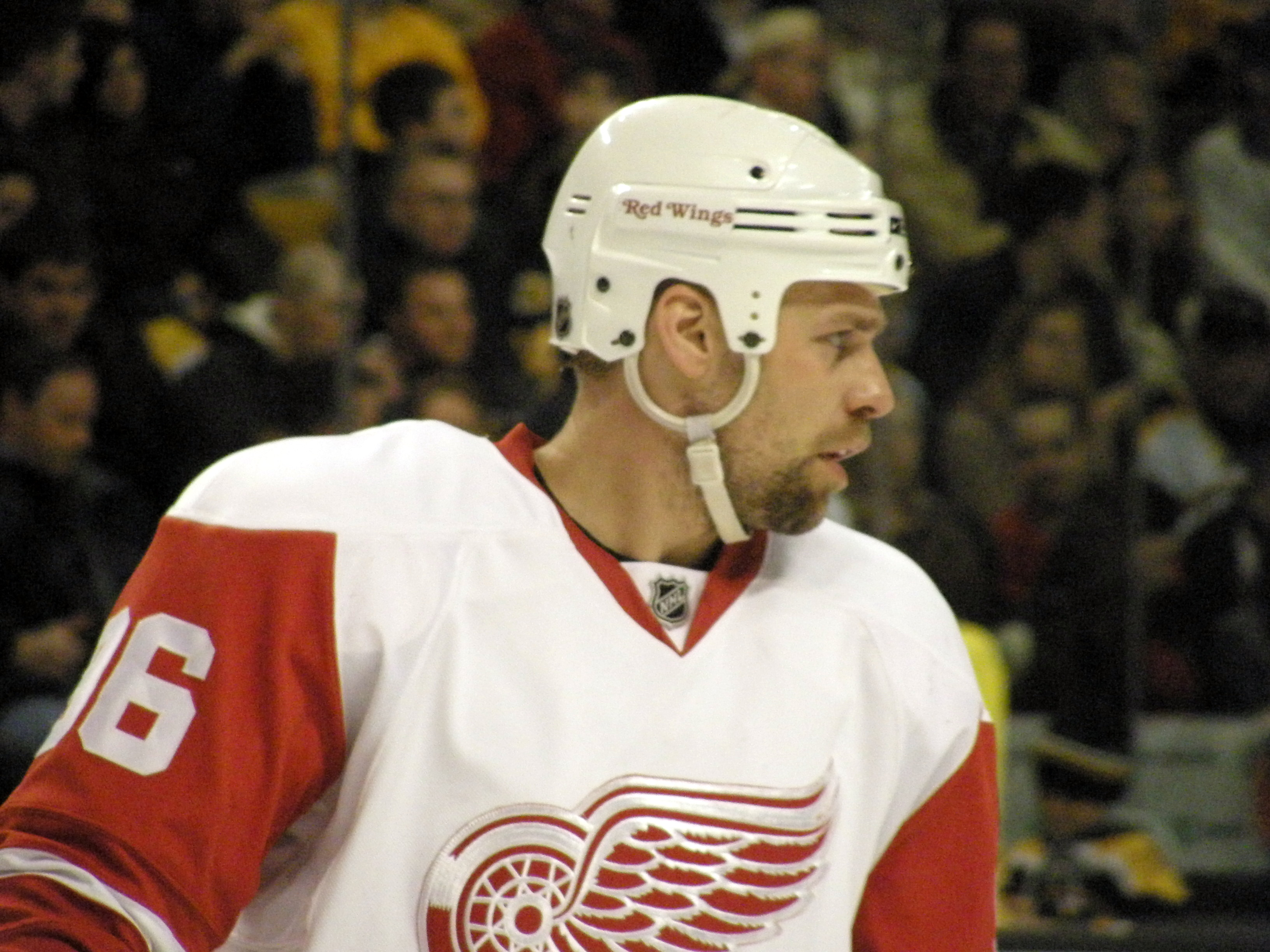
- Holmström with the Detroit Red Wings in 2008
- Born: 23 January 1973 (age 53) Piteå, Sweden
- Height: 6 ft 0 in (183 cm)
- Weight: 200 lb (91 kg; 14 st 4 lb)
- Position: Left wing
- Shot: Left
- Played for: Luleå HF; Detroit Red Wings
- National team: Sweden
- NHL draft: 257th overall, 1994; Detroit Red Wings
- Playing career: 1990–2012

Bengt Tomas Holmström (pronounced [ˈtʊ̌mːas ˈhɔ̂lːmstrœm]; born 23 January 1973) is a Swedish former professional ice hockey left winger who played his entire National Hockey League (NHL) career with the Detroit Red Wings, with whom he won four Stanley Cup championships; in 1997, 1998, 2002 and 2008.

During his playing career, Holmström was widely considered one of the NHL's best at screening the opposition's goaltender, as well as for his physical presence in front of the opposition's net.

== Playing career ==
Holmström was first noticed by Detroit Red Wings scout Håkan Andersson in 1993 during a Swedish national team selection camp, where Holmström missed the cut, then again the next year while playing with Boden, where his coach, Niklas Wikegård, told Andersson that Holmström was the team's best player. He was then drafted 257th overall by Detroit in the 1994 NHL entry draft and began playing for the Red Wings in the 1996–97 season. During the 2004–05 NHL lockout, Holmström returned to Sweden to play for his old team, Luleå HF, in the Swedish top flight league, the Elitserien.

Holmström was inducted into the Piteå Wall of Fame in his hometown in 2006.

On 7 April 2007 Holmström scored his 30th goal of the 2006–07 season against the Chicago Blackhawks, reaching the 30-goal plateau in a season for the first time in his career.

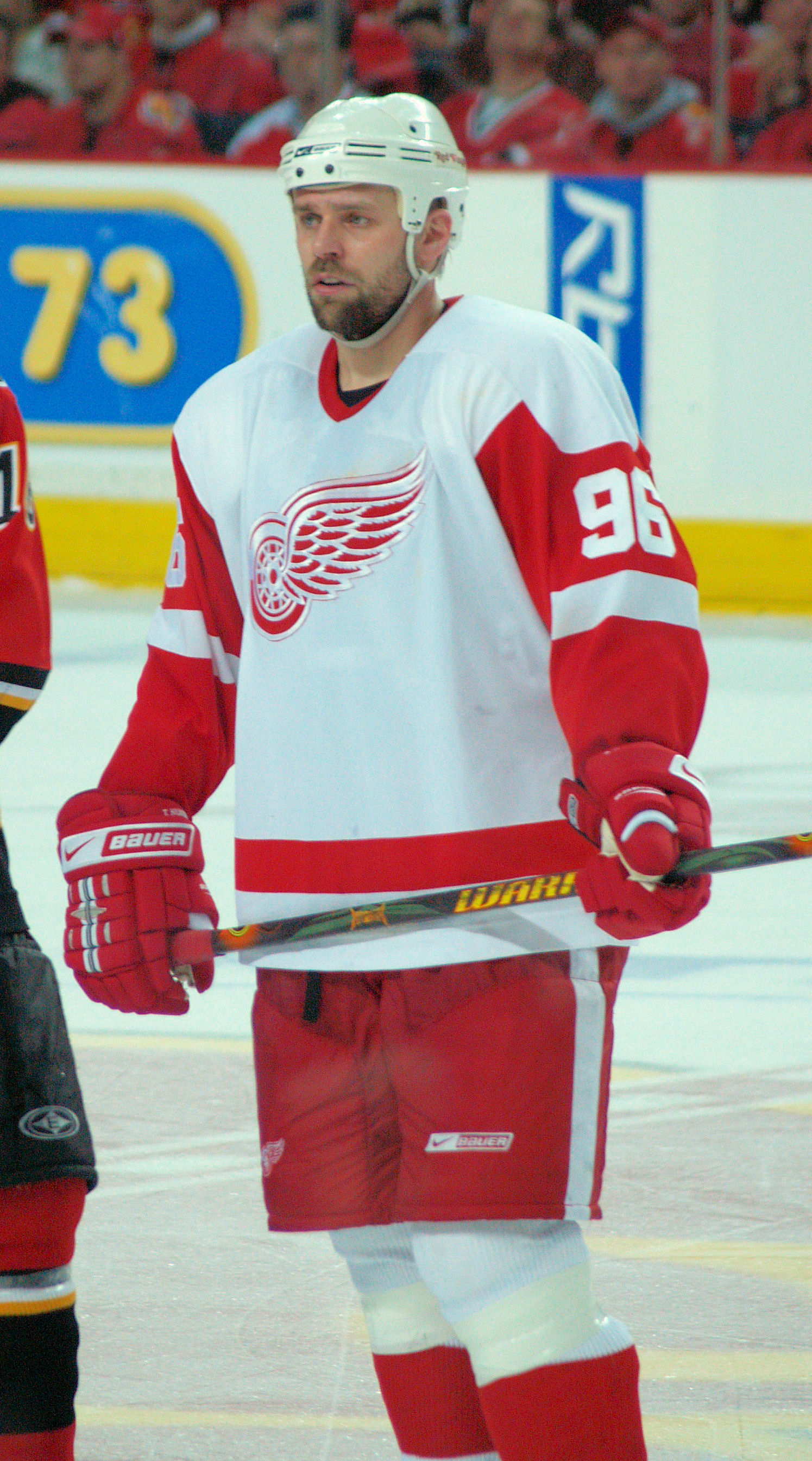
Holmström with Detroit in 2007.

Holmström scored 12 points during the 2008 Stanley Cup playoffs as the Red Wings won the Stanley Cup for the fourth time in 11 years over the Pittsburgh Penguins. On his day with the Cup, he had his cousin's daughter baptized in it.

During the 2009–10 season, Holmström was initially selected to play in the 2010 Winter Olympics in Vancouver, British Columbia. A knee injury sustained on 13 February 2010, in a game against the Ottawa Senators, however, prevented him from playing in the tournament. It was announced the next day, 14 February, that he would be replaced by friend and Red Wing teammate Johan Franzén. The announcement came from Sweden Head Coach Bengt-Åke Gustafsson. On 4 June 2010, during the season's subsequent off-season, Holmström agreed on a two-year contract extension to remain in Detroit after an impressive season in which he scored 25 goals, second on the team only to sniper Pavel Datsyuk's 27; Holmström also scored a team-high 13 goals on the power play.

On 12 February 2012 Holmström became only the sixth Red Wing and 272nd NHL player to play 1,000 games.

After the retirement of long-time Red Wings defenceman Nicklas Lidström at the end of the 2011–12 season, Holmström became the last active player from the 1997 and 1998 Stanley Cup-winning Detroit teams to still be active with the team. However, he didn't play a single game after Lidström announced his retirement.

On 22 January 2013 Holmström announced his retirement from professional hockey just hours before Detroit's home opener at Joe Louis Arena against the Dallas Stars in the lockout-shortened season. As of January 2013, Holmström held the following records with the Red Wings: sixth in most regular season games played, fourth in playoff games played and 13th in points scored.

== Playing style ==
During his playing career, Holmström was known for his presence in front of the opposition's goal and his ability to screen the opposing team's goaltender. Because he had to withstand teammates' shots towards goal, as well as efforts from opponents to vacate him from in front of the net, Holmström wore additional padding to protect his body. During a playoff series against the Columbus Blue Jackets in 2009, Detroit Head Coach Mike Babcock said of Holmström, "I think there's [defencemen] out there who think they might actually get to him. That's just not possible."

Due to his obstructive playing style and close proximity to goalies and the crease, Holmström attained a reputation and was often charged with goaltender interference penalties as well as occasionally having goals called back because of his proximity to the goaltender's crease. Holmström himself, as well as Red Wings TV announcers Mickey Redmond and Ken Daniels, often questioned the legitimacy of these calls by the on-ice officials.

Holmström was known to many fans in Detroit by the nickname of "Homer." He acquired the nickname "Demolition Man" while playing in Sweden, where he was also called "Holma."

== International play ==
Medal record

Representing Sweden

Ice hockey

Olympic Games
Gold medal – first place	2006 Turin	

Holmström has participated in four international tournaments for Sweden:

- 1996 Men's World Ice Hockey Championships
- 2002 Winter Olympics
- 2004 World Cup of Hockey
- 2006 Winter Olympics

== Career statistics ==
=== Regular season and playoffs ===
			Regular season					Playoffs
Season	Team	League	GP	G	A	Pts	PIM	GP	G	A	Pts	PIM
1989–90	Piteå HC	SWE II	9	1	0	1	4	—	—	—	—	—
1990–91	Piteå HC	SWE II	26	5	4	9	16	—	—	—	—	—
1991–92	Piteå HC	SWE II	31	15	12	27	44	—	—	—	—	—
1992–93	Piteå HC	SWE II	31	17	15	32	30	—	—	—	—	—
1993–94	Bodens IK	SWE II	34	23	16	39	86	9	3	3	6	24
1994–95	Luleå HF	SEL	40	14	14	28	56	8	1	2	3	20
1995–96	Luleå HF	SEL	34	12	11	23	78	11	6	2	8	22
1996–97	Adirondack Red Wings	AHL	6	3	1	4	7	—	—	—	—	—
1996–97	Detroit Red Wings	NHL	47	6	3	9	33	1	0	0	0	0
1997–98	Detroit Red Wings	NHL	57	5	17	22	44	22	7	12	19	16
1998–99	Detroit Red Wings	NHL	82	13	21	34	69	10	4	3	7	4
1999–2000	Detroit Red Wings	NHL	72	13	22	35	43	9	3	1	4	16
2000–01	Detroit Red Wings	NHL	73	16	24	40	40	6	1	3	4	8
2001–02	Detroit Red Wings	NHL	69	8	18	26	58	23	8	3	11	8
2002–03	Detroit Red Wings	NHL	74	20	20	40	62	4	1	1	2	4
2003–04	Detroit Red Wings	NHL	67	15	15	30	38	12	2	2	4	10
2004–05	Luleå HF	SEL	47	14	16	30	50	4	0	0	0	18
2005–06	Detroit Red Wings	NHL	81	29	30	59	66	6	1	2	3	12
2006–07	Detroit Red Wings	NHL	77	30	22	52	59	15	5	3	8	14
2007–08	Detroit Red Wings	NHL	59	20	20	40	58	21	4	8	12	26
2008–09	Detroit Red Wings	NHL	53	14	23	37	38	23	2	5	7	22
2009–10	Detroit Red Wings	NHL	68	25	20	45	60	12	4	3	7	12
2010–11	Detroit Red Wings	NHL	73	18	19	37	62	11	3	4	7	8
2011–12	Detroit Red Wings	NHL	74	11	13	24	40	5	1	1	2	2
SEL totals			121	40	41	81	184	23	7	4	11	60
NHL totals			1,026	243	287	530	769	180	46	51	97	162

=== International ===
Year	Team	Event	Result	GP	G	A	Pts	PIM
1996	Sweden	WC	6th	6	1	0	1	12
2002	Sweden	OG	5th	4	1	0	1	2
2004	Sweden	WCH	5th	4	3	2	5	8
2006	Sweden	OG	1st place, gold medalist(s)	8	1	3	4	10
Senior totals				22	6	5	11	32

== Awards ==
- Elitserien gold medal with Luleå HF in 1996;
- Named to the Swedish All-Star Team in 1996;
- Gold medal at the Winter Olympics in 2006;
- Four-time Stanley Cup winner (1997, 1998, 2002, 2008).

== See also ==
- List of NHL players with 1,000 games played
