= Djurgårdens IF (men's ice hockey) =

Ice hockey club in Stockholm, Sweden

- City: Stockholm, Sweden
- League: SHL
- Founded: 1922
- Home arena: Hovet and Avicii Arena
- Colours
- General manager: Niklas Wikegård
- Head coach: Robert Kimby
- Captain: Marcus Krüger
- Website: www.difhockey.se

Franchise history
- 1922–1934: Djurgårdens IF
- 1938–present: Djurgårdens IF

Championships
- Regular season titles: 6 (1985, 1988, 1991, 1995, 1998, 2000, 2001)
- Le Mat Trophy: (16) (1926, 1950, 1954, 1955, 1958, 1959, 1960, 1961, 1962, 1963, 1983, 1989, 1990, 1991, 2000, 2001)

Djurgårdens IF Ishockeyförening, commonly known as Djurgårdens IF, Djurgården Hockey, or Djurgården (IPA: [ˈjʉ̂ːrˌɡoːɖɛn]), is a professional ice hockey team based in Stockholm, Sweden, affiliated with the Djurgårdens IF umbrella organisation. Djurgården compete in the Swedish Hockey League, which is the top tier Swedish ice hockey league. The men's team is the most successful Swedish ice hockey team of all time, as 16-time Swedish champions, 12-time runners-up, 26-time finalists, and first in the marathon table for the top flight of Swedish hockey. The ice hockey section was first established in 1922 and has since been playing in the Swedish league system, with the exception of four years in the 1930s when the hockey section was temporarily dissolved.

Djurgården primarily play their home games at Hovet, an older arena built in the 1950s with a capacity of 8,094, but high-profile matches such as derbies against AIK and playoff games may be played in Avicii Arena with its larger capacity of 13,950.

Djurgården have retired nine players' jerseys in their history, and have retired the number 2 twice, since both Roland Stoltz and Charles Berglund had worn the number before retiring jerseys became well-established in Sweden. The most common nicknames for the team are "Järnkaminerna" (lit. 'The Iron Stoves'), "Stockholms stolthet" (lit. 'The Pride of Stockholm') and "Mesta mästarna" (lit. 'The Winners of Most Championships'). Djurgården also has a supporters' club called Järnkaminerna, which it shares with the football section.

== History ==
=== 1922–1949: Founding, first championship and dissolution ===
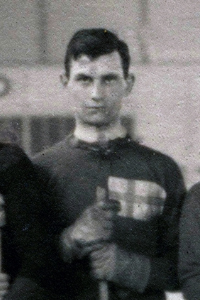
Wilhelm Arwe, pictured here representing Sweden at the 1920 Olympics, was a driving force behind the founding of the ice hockey section.

Djurgårdens IF was founded on 12 March 1891 at a café at the address of Alberget 4A on the island Djurgården. Ice hockey was introduced in Sweden in 1921, and the club's ice hockey section was founded in 1922 with the help of IK Göta player Wilhelm Arwe. The ice hockey team participated in its first Swedish championship the same year, being beaten by Hammarby in the semi-finals. The team's roster consisted of only six players but was reinforced with five new players for the following season. Djurgården managed to reach the final during this season against IK Göta which proved to be too strong, with Djurgården losing 3–0 at Stockholm Olympic Stadium. The procedure was repeated in 1924 and Djurgården had to wait until 1926 to finally lift the Le Mat trophy for the first time, after a 7–1 victory against Västerås IK. This was also the very first time the Le Mat trophy was awarded to the winning team. The club was successful early on and four Djurgården players were named to the Swedish roster in the 1924 Winter Olympics. At the 1926 Swedish Championship, the team featured three of those players, Wilhelm Arwe, Ernst Karlberg and Ruben Allinger.

In the beginning of the 1930s, the success Djurgården had during the 1920s began to fade. High costs and low attendance figures took their toll on the hockey section, and the main club itself. At the same time, no new leaders or players joined Djurgården. When the team was relegated to the second tier in 1934, having won only two games during the season, the hockey section was dissolved. Instead, focus shifted to the bandy section, which was allocated the hockey section's resources.

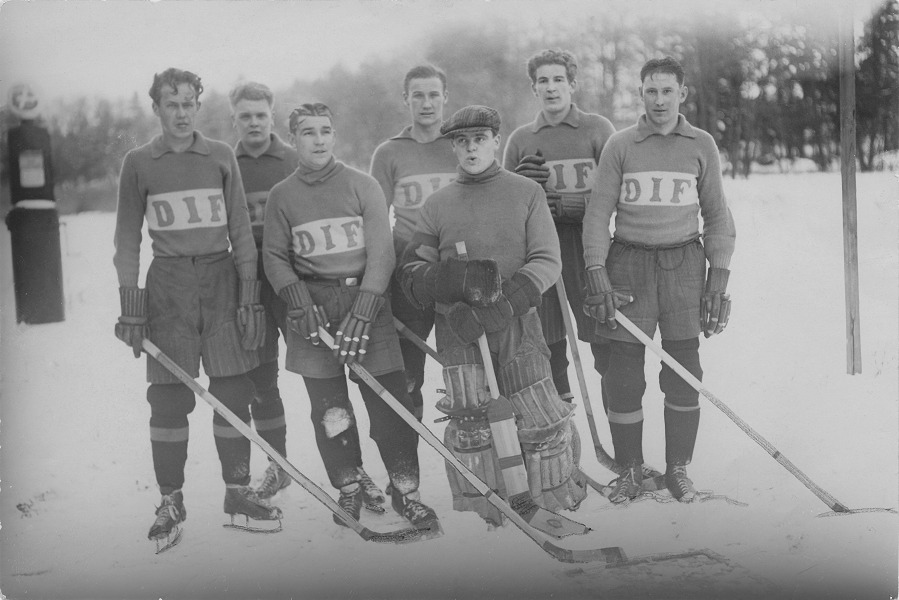
The 1933 team

The section was restarted in 1938 in the sixth division (Klass VI) and the team consisted of former players like Einar Svensson and Gustaf Johansson. The team only played three league games during this season; but this was enough to win the sixth division and get the team promoted to the fifth division. Problems arose when the club tried to recruit new players. Those who were asked to join the team thought the inquiry was some kind of joke. However, the club managed to gather enough players to take part in the following season's matches. These players had mainly played bandy and football prior to joining the hockey team. The plan for the coming seasons was to get promoted every year until the club reached the highest division again. Thus the 1940s consisted mainly of climbing in the league system.

For three consecutive seasons from the fifth division, Skuru IK was always ahead of Djurgården in the league table. However, as two teams were promoted from every division, this was of no concern. The 1942–43 season was never completed due to warm weather, but since the national division 2 were expanded to six leagues for the 1943–44 season, both Djurgården and Skuru were promoted anyway. This meant that Djurgården had now left the local Stockholm leagues and advanced to the national leagues. Djurgården would have to wait until 1947 to finally win a division again, only to be beaten by Atlas Diesel and Västerås SK in the promotion playoffs. For the 1948–49 season, the team was finally back in the highest league, and finished second behind Hammarby. No Swedish championship was played this season due to warm weather, and the only available hockey rink at Stockholm Olympic Stadium was not sufficient. The hockey section had now trained their own talents, who began to replace many of the players still playing for either the bandy or the football section.

=== 1950–1963: The golden era ===
The 1950s began on a high note for Djurgården. While the team struggled against Hammarby in the league, the Swedish Championship was a different matter. After winning on walkover against Forshaga IF, the team advanced to the semi-finals to meet Hammarby. The dominant team of the 1930s and the 1940s was defeated 3–1 with goals from Karl-Erik Andersson and twins Hans and Stig Andersson. In the final, Djurgården defeated Mora IK 7–2 following a hat-trick by Gösta Johansson, securing the club's first Swedish Championship in 24 years.

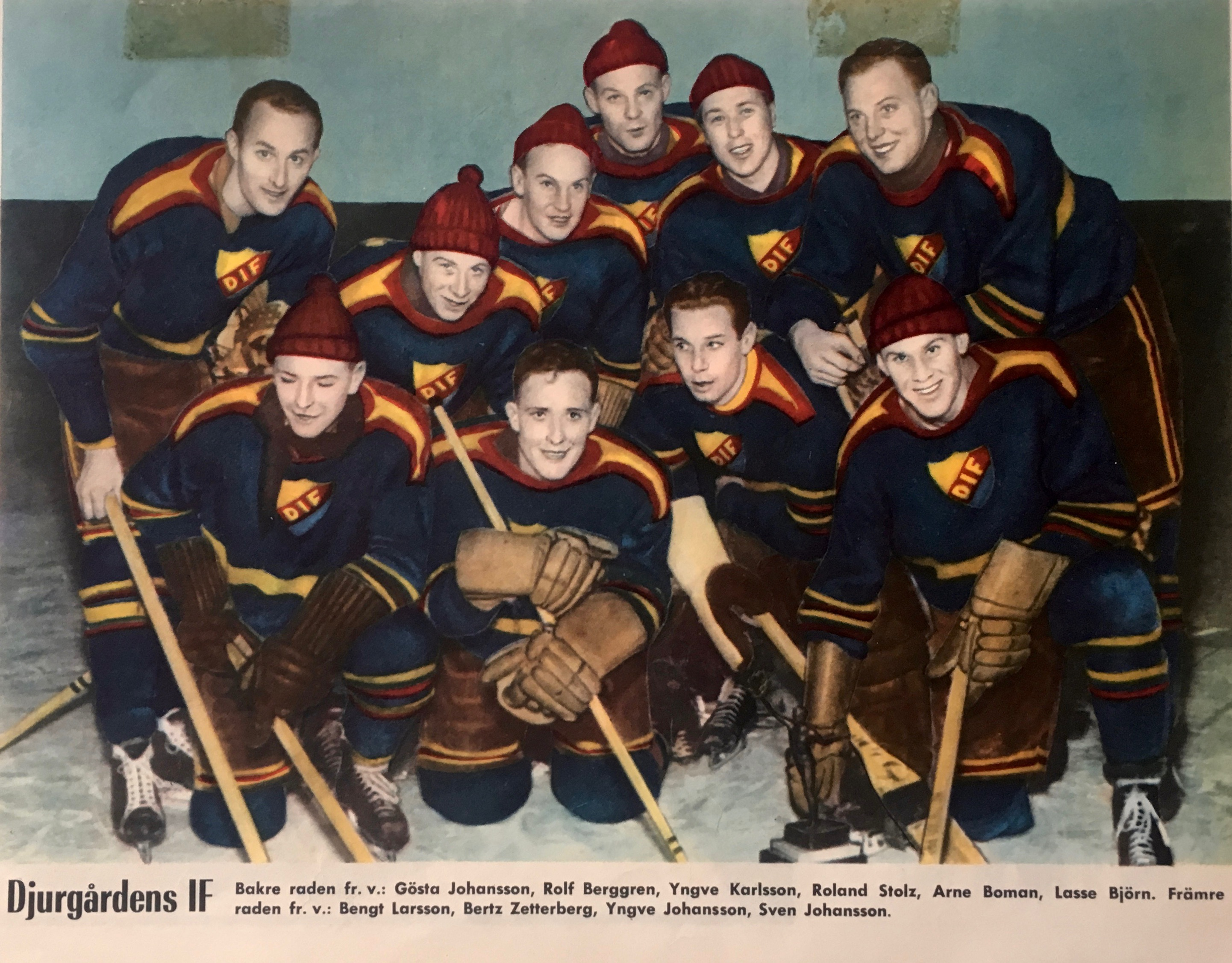
The 1957–58 championship team.

The Swedish championship was remade for the 1952–53 season. Instead of a single-elimination tournament with a total of eight teams, the winners of the south and north divisions met each other twice to decide the championship. Djurgården's opponent in the final were Gävle GIK; the first game ended with a 5–1 victory, and the second game ended with a 1–1 draw. Led by Sven Johansson's 19-goal season, Djurgården went on to win the south division by winning all ten league games in the 1954–55 season. Both finals in 1955 were played at Johanneshovs IP and Djurgården won both games against Hammarby IF, 6–3 in the first and 11–2 in the second final. The second final is still a record for the number of goals scored in a Swedish championship final. The Swedish championship was again changed as of the 1955–56 season to be decided by a four team championship series, which qualified through the two top positions of the Division I north and south respectively. Djurgården followed up the Swedish championship with two runner-up positions in the championship series behind Södertälje SK and Gävle Godtemplares IK in 1956 and 1957 respectively. Three Djurgården players; Sven Johansson, Lasse Björn, and Roland Stoltz was part of the 1957 world championship team, which was Sweden's second championship title of the tournament.

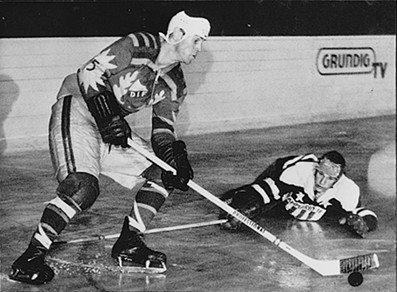
Sven "Tumba" Johansson in 1960.

In 1958, the club claimed its fifth Swedish championship title by winning four of six games in the championship series, with Sven Johansson leading the scoring with nine goals and twelve points. This was the start of a period of six consecutive titles until 1963. Between the start of the 1958–59 season until 8 November 1962, Djurgården went unbeaten in 57 consecutive regular season games. Three members of Djurgården's 1959 ice hockey championship team; Sven "Tumba" Johansson, Gösta Sandberg, and Hans Mild, also played for the club's football department, which won the Swedish championship in the same year. Djurgården secured the championship title in 1960, finishing four points ahead of Södertälje SK, and repeated the feat in 1961 with the same margin over runner-up Skellefteå AIK. The championship series were expanded as of the 1962 season, and Djurgården was for the first time in several seasons challenged for the Swedish championship, by Västra Frölunda IF. The two teams finished level on 13 points, with Djurgården claiming the championship on goal difference after their final meeting ended 4–4, Sven Tumba scoring the equaliser. After missing out on the regular season title in the 1962–63 season season, Djurgården bounced back in the championship series. They won again on goal difference, finishing tied for first place with Skellefteå AIK at 11 points. During the 1950s and early 1960s, Djurgården emerged as the most consistently successful team in Swedish ice hockey. Between the 1953–54 and 1962–63 seasons, the team played 128 regular season games, achieving 115 wins, five ties, and only eight losses, a record that underscored its dominance during this golden era.

=== 1964–1988: Rebuilding between championship eras ===
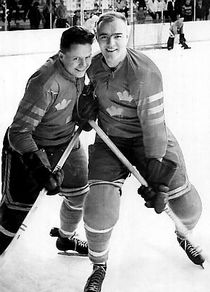
Gösta Sandberg and Hans Mild with the Swedish national ice hockey team in 1961.

In the 1950s and the early 1960s, Djurgården's ice hockey team was known for its consistent lineup, with most players hailing from the Stockholm area. However, the club underwent a generational shift in the early 1960s, as several veteran players including Gösta Sandberg, Stig Andersson-Tvilling, and Hans Mild retired from ice hockey. This transition marked the end of an era, and Djurgården missed out on medal positions in the 1963–64 Swedish championship. The following season, 1964–65, was the first time since 1953 that the team failed to qualify for the championship, finishing fifth in Division I South. In response, the club began to move away from its local roots and initiated a broader recruitment strategy, signing three promising players from Modo AIK. The transfer sparked controversy, as Modo's leadership refused to approve the move, resulting in the players being suspended for most of the 1965–66 season. The episode exemplified a broader shift during the late 1960s and into the 1970s, when Djurgården increasingly brought in players from other parts of Sweden. These players were also traded more frequently, often staying only for short periods. This reflected a growing lack of continuity in the team's player roster and less locally anchored team composition.

Djurgården was left outside the championship series from 1969 to 1971, and when the team managed to qualify they were never close to winning the championship series, often ending up in the middle or the lower end in the late 1960s and early 1970s. Djurgården nearly failed to qualify for the inaugural season of the new top-tier league, Elitserien, after a poor regular season performance, but secured their spot by winning the following qualification series. The team also experienced a difficult 1975–76 season in the Elitserien, finishing 9th and subsequently moving down to the second tier Division I, after 28 consecutive seasons at the top level of the Swedish hockey league system. The following season, the team showed strong form in Division I East, recording 28 wins in 33 games and a goal difference of +189. They went unbeaten in the playoffs and ended up first in the 1977 Kvalserien, thus earning promotion back to Elitserien.

Following the 1977–78 season, in which Djurgården avoided relegation but failed to qualify for the playoffs, head coach Hans Mild was replaced by Eilert Määttä. The club also acquired forward Anders Kallur from Modo AIK, who went on to lead the league in scoring during the regular season. Djurgården won the opening match of the finals, but Modo, Kallur's former team, secured the title in the subsequent games. Bert-Ola Nordlander succeeded Määttä as head coach for two seasons, during which Djurgården remained in the lower half of the standings and failed to reach the playoffs. Leif Boork replaced Nordlander ahead of the 1981–82 season. Under his leadership, Djurgården earned a reputation for a physical and controversial style of play, and narrowly avoided relegation via the 1982 Kvalserien.

Boork's second season as head coach was a successful one. The team finished second in the regular season standings, just behind Färjestad BK, but went on to win the Swedish championship through a strong playoff performance. In the semi-finals, Djurgården defeated Björklöven by 2–1 in games, and in the finals, they beat Färjestad with 3–2 in games after trailing 2–1 in the series following the third game. The championship-winning goal in game five was scored by Thomas Eriksson, marking his sole playoff goal and securing the first championship in 20 years. Boork led the team to another final series the following season, this time ending in a 3–0 sweeping loss in games to arch rivals AIK. Gunnar Svensson took charge after Boork headed on to coach the Swedish national team, leading the team to another final series, this time against Södertälje SK which ultimately won in five games. Djurgården struggled in the 1985–86 season and spent much of the season battling relegation. Svensson was sacked in January 1986, despite having signed a five-year contract as the head coach just a few months earlier. Although the team reached the championship finals three times in the mid-1980s, the overall financial situation remained unstable. The club, whose finances were consolidated across all different sporting sections, faced a debt burden of more than 15 million Swedish krona, contrasted with assets amounting to only three million. The club avoided collapse through a debt settlement, leading to efforts to restructure its economy.

=== 1989–1999: Three championships and two finals ===
Djurgården secured their 12th Swedish Championship title in the 1988–89 Elitserien season under the leadership of head coach Tommy Boustedt and assistant coach Lasse Falk. The team finished first in the regular season standings, one point ahead of Leksands IF, with Kent Nilsson leading Djurgården in scoring. Notably, Leksand had won all regular season games against Djurgården, setting the stage for a competitive final series between the two clubs. Despite losing the opening game of the finals, Djurgården responded by winning three consecutive games, thereby clinching the championship with a 3–1 series victory. The finals was played during the inaugural year of the Stockholm Globe arena. The following season, Djurgården successfully defended their title, becoming the first team to do so since Brynäs IF in the 1976–77 season. They defeated Färjestad in the finals with a 3–1 series win.

In 1989, Mats Sundin became the first European-born player to be selected first overall in the National Hockey League (NHL) draft, shortly before making his debut season with the senior team of Djurgården in the Elitserien. Despite a multi-year contract and public statements that he would stay, Sundin left Djurgården in September 1990 to join Quebec Nordiques. The transfer, valued at over six million Swedish krona, made him the most expensive Swedish player sold to the NHL at the time. His departure, along with Johan Garpenlöv's, weakened Djurgården's top lines just before the start of the 1990–91 season. Nontheless, Djurgården won both the regular season and the continuation round of the 1990–91 Elitserien season, finishing first overall. The team remained unbeaten throughout the playoffs, defeating Södertälje SK and Västerås IK in the quarterfinals and semi-finals respectively, and Färjestad BK in the finals. This marked Djurgården's third consecutive Swedish Championship title, a feat unmatched since the formation of Elitserien in 1975. Djurgården also achieved success on the European stage by winning the IIHF European Cup in both 1990 and 1991, beating HC Dynamo Moscow and Düsseldorfer EG respectively in the finals. Djurgården were unable to secure a fourth consecutive title the following season after losing in the finals in five games against Malmö IF.

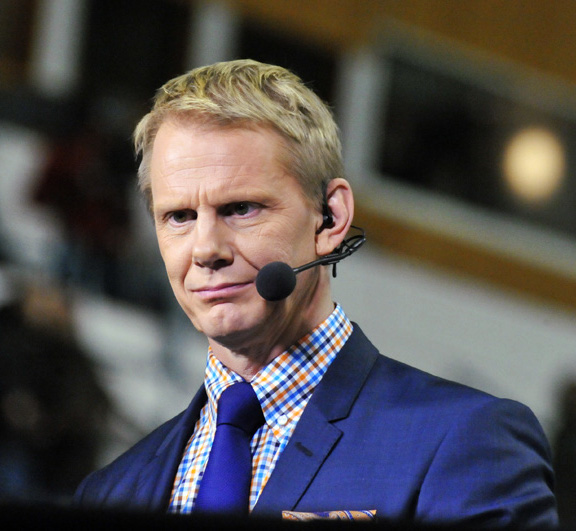
Wikegård coached the team during the 1997–98 Elitserien season.

In early 1993, Djurgården suffered a substantial financial loss following allegations of financial mismanagement involving the club's accounts, where funds were reportedly used for personal and speculative purposes. Djurgården lost over five million Swedish krona excluding interest, and was saved from bankruptcy by a loan provided by the other clubs in the Elitserien. The 1994–95 season saw the return of Mats Sundin during the 1994–95 NHL lockout. Despite winning the regular season, Djurgården were unexpectedly defeated in the quarterfinals against HV71, who went on to win their first Swedish championship. Djurgården played well during the 1995–96 and 1996–97 regular seasons, but struggled in the playoffs and were eliminated in the quarterfinals in both of those years. Under the leadership of Niklas Wikegård, Djurgården won the 1997–98 Elitserien regular season, and Patric Kjellberg was the top goal scorer with 30 goals. The team reached the finals against Färjestad, and ultimately lost in five games, the last being decided by sudden death.

=== 2000–2011: Torpedo hockey and economic struggle ===
Djurgården won back-to-back Swedish championships in 2000 and 2001. Led by coaches Hardy Nilsson and Mats Waltin, the team played a fast, attacking hockey using the torpedo system and defeated Modo in the 2000 finals, then overcame Färjestad in the 2001 finals. These titles marked the club's 15th and 16th national championships.

In the early 2000s, Stockholm's ice hockey teams saw a clear drop in attendance, also affecting Djurgården despite recent Swedish championships. The sport faced increasing competition from local football teams, whose popularity and crowd numbers grew significantly during the same period. Under Swedish Ice Hockey Association regulations, Stockholm's elite teams were limited to playing in approved arenas, Hovet and the Globe arena. The former lacked the commercial benefits of modern venues, while the latter was criticized for its high rental costs. Meanwhile, clubs in smaller cities built modern venues with support from the local municipalities, secured better sponsorships, and boosted revenue through in-arena sales, gaining stronger financial footing.

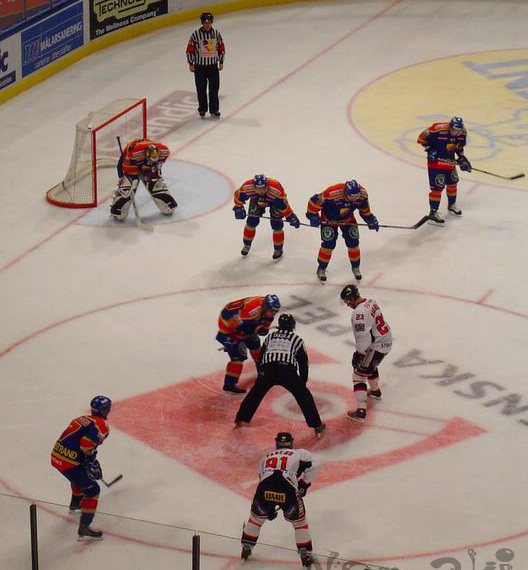
Djurgården against Malmö Redhawks in November 2006

Djurgården suffered from economical problems after the 2004–05 Elitserien season and lost 16 players before the following season. The club had to rely players from the junior teams and could only acquire new players who were rejected by other clubs due to the poor economy. The club's goal for the 2005–06 season was to stay clear of the relegation positions in the league table, which was accomplished. However, for the first time in 20 years, Djurgården was left outside the playoffs.

For the 2007–08 season, they changed their official home ice from the Stockholm Globe Arena to their smaller, former home arena, Hovet. However, a portion of games remained in the larger venue. Djurgården reached the playoffs, finishing seventh in the regular season. The runner-up of the regular season, Linköping HC, chose Djurgården and knocked them out of the playoffs, 4–1 in games. In the following 2008–09 season, Djurgården was often close to the relegation spots. Five straight wins after new year put Djurgården on safe ground. Although as the teams on the last playoff-spots kept winning, the team ended up on 10th position in the league table. The 2009–10 season began with the Nordic Trophy pre-season tournament, which Djurgården won. Djurgården finished second in the league and lost the finals to HV71, Djurgården won the first final 4–3 but lost 4–2 in matches. Five of six finals went to overtime. This was the first finals for Djurgården since the 2001 playoffs.

=== 2012–present: Relegations and promotions ===
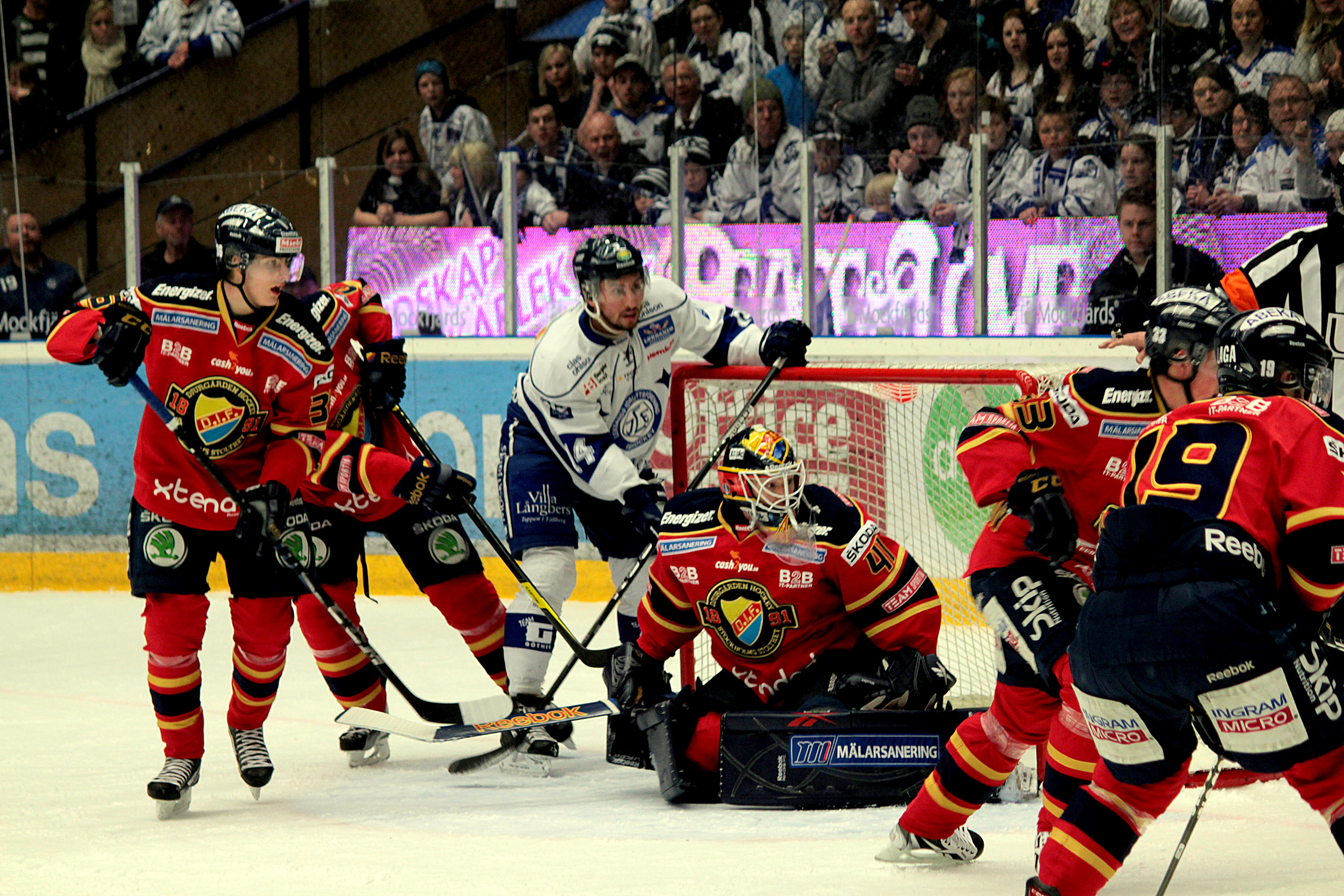
Djurgården against Leksands IF during the 2012 Kvalserien

After struggling through the 2011–12 season, Djurgården finished eleventh and had to play in the 2012 Kvalserien. Subsequently, the team was relegated to the second-tier league HockeyAllsvenskan for the 2012–13 season after failing to make the top two spots in the Kvalserien. This ended a 35-year run of consecutive Elitserien seasons for Djurgården. Big budget cuts were also made, the player salary budget was cut in half. Djurgården set the goal to return to Elitserien immediately the following season. The team reached fifth place in the regular season, and Djurgården had to play qualification games for the 2013 Kvalserien. However, Djurgården failed to reach the top position in the playoff series and the season was over.

The team was renewed for the 2013–14 season, with veteran players Kristofer Ottosson, Jimmie Ölvestad, Fredrik Bremberg and Christian Eklund retiring. Djurgården finished the regular season on third place in the league table, which guaranteed a spot in the 2014 Kvalserien. The fight for second place after already qualified Örebro was close, and had to be decided in the last round of Kvalserien. Djurgården managed to grab the spot with 17 points, the same number as Rögle but with better goal difference due to a 6–2 win against Västerås IK in the final game of the season. Djurgården was once again a team of Sweden's top tier league. The Swedish Hockey League board stirred up a controversy with the decision to redistribute 6 million Swedish krona of TV sponsorship from Djurgården to newly relegated rival club AIK in May 2014. AIK received the money to ease the transition from Swedish Hockey League to HockeyAllsvenskan.

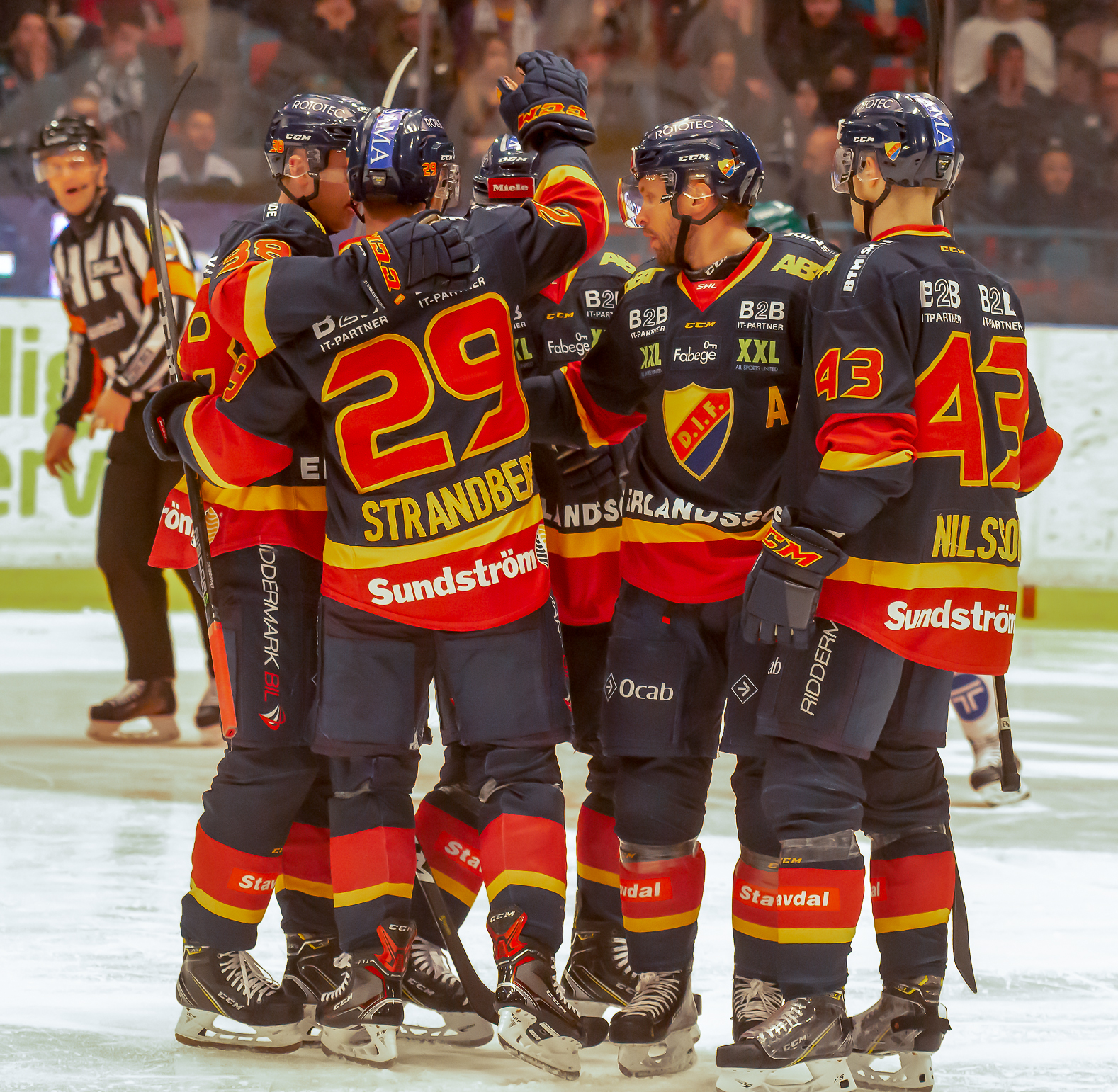
Djurgården players celebrating a goal by Sebastian Strandberg against Färjestad BK in 2019

Djurgården re-established themselves in the SHL during the following season, and successfully avoided relegation. Nevertheless, they were eliminated in the first round of the championship playoffs. It was not until the 2017–18 season that Djurgården achieved a top placement, finishing second in the regular season and subsequently reaching the semi-finals, where they were eliminated in six games by Skellefteå AIK. Djurgården reached the finals of the 2018–19 SHL season after beating Skellefteå AIK in the quarterfinals and Färjestad BK in the semi-finals. This was the first finals for Djurgården since 2010. They faced Frölunda HC in the finals, and ultimately lost in six games.

After a weak 2021–22 SHL season, Djurgården ended up on 13th place in the regular season table, and was forced to play a relegation play-off against Timrå IK. Djurgården fell through and lost in four games, resulting in their relegation to the second tier HockeyAllsvenskan. As a result, the following season marked the first time in the history of the Swedish Hockey League that no team from Stockholm participated.

The following two seasons, Djurgården played promotion finals from the HockeyAllsvenskan and losing against Modo Hockey and Brynäs IF respectively. In the 2024–25 season, Djurgården won the regular season and won against Mora IK in four games in the promotion quarter finals, and against Södertälje SK in seven games in the semi-finals. The promotion finals were played against arch rivals AIK, which ultimately was won by Djurgården in five games, securing their promotion to the 2025–26 SHL season. Djurgården finished ninth in the 2025–26 regular season before being eliminated in the eighth-finals by Malmö Redhawks, 1–2 in games.

== Team information ==
=== Club structure ===
Since the forming of the sports club in 1891, the finances were consolidated across all different sporting sections. In the late 1980s Djurgårdens IF faced a debt burden of more than 15 million Swedish krona, contrasted with assets amounting to only 3 million. The club avoided collapse through a debt settlement, leading to efforts to restructure its economy. In 1990, the club was reorganised. Each sporting section became its own legal entity with separate finances, and a governing non-profit association was formed to preserve ownership of the emblem and trademark.

The ice hockey club was still a non-profit association after the reorganisation. Djurgården Hockey AB, a limited company, was created with plans to corporatize the club's elite hockey operations in 1997 through a listing on the Stockholm Stock Exchange's O-list. The share issue was oversubscribed, bringing in roughly 46 million Swedish krona, but the Swedish Sports Confederation judged the listing to be in breach of its statutes and threatened to exclude the club from both the Swedish Ice Hockey Association and the Elitserien. The corporatization was therefore abandoned, and Djurgården had to repay the funds with interest, leaving the club with an additional debt of about five million Swedish krona.

In April 2008, the corporatization was implemented and the J18 and J20 teams from the junior system along with the senior team was transferred to Djurgården Hockey AB. Stakeholders were invited to buy up to 25 percent of the shares in the company Djurgården Hockey AB, while the non-profit association Djurgårdens IF Ishockeyförening owned the remaining 75 percent of the company. Anschutz Entertainment Group bought 12.5 percent of the shares. Following its corporatization, Djurgården Hockey has carried out share issues to raise additional funds for the club.

=== Emblem and colours ===
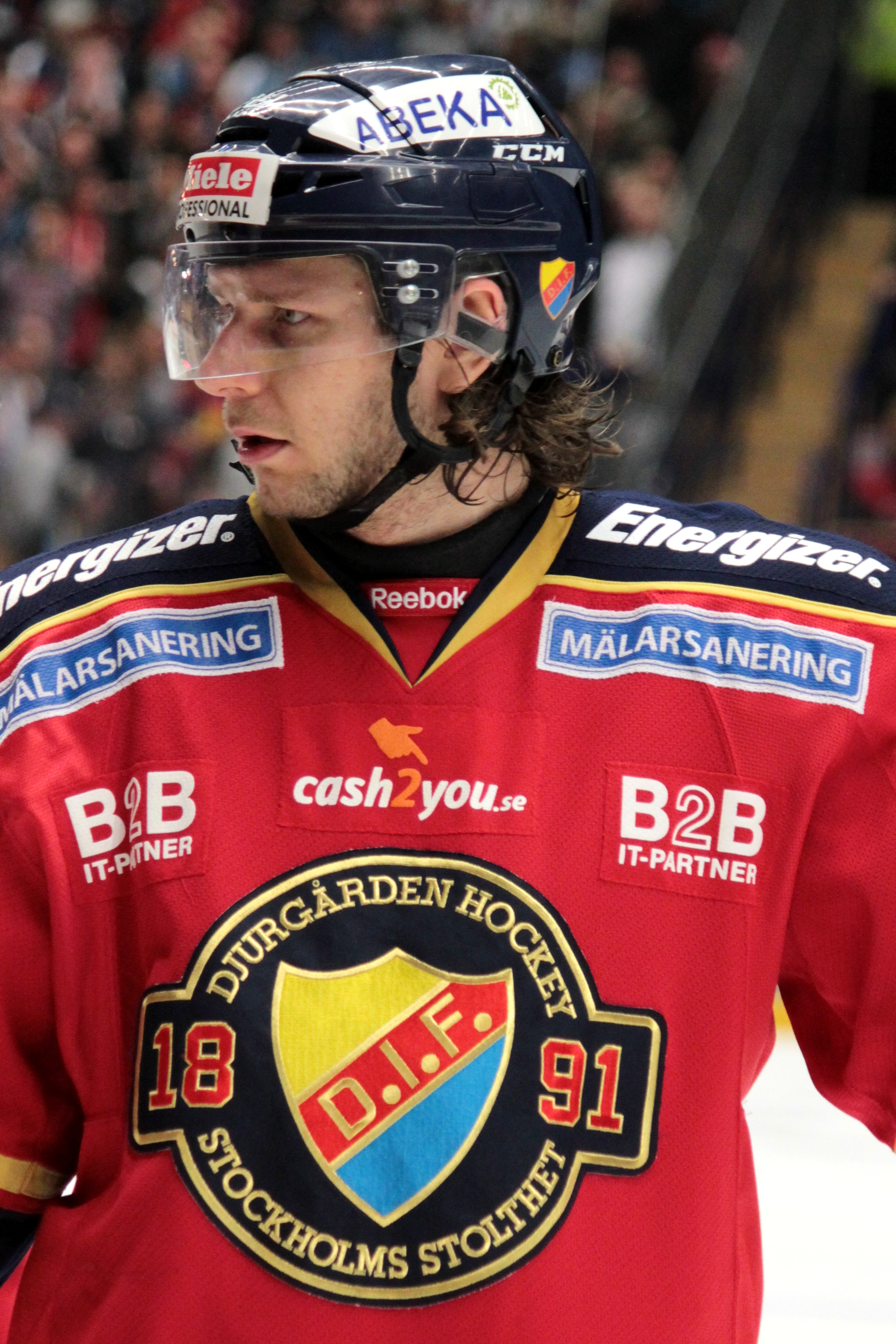
Andreas Holmqvist seen wearing the red jersey during the 2011–12 season, with the emblem underscored by "Stockholms stolthet", meaning "the pride of Stockholm".

The first emblem of the club was a four-pointed silver star in saltire, which had a shield on it with the letters "DIF". This emblem was never used by the ice hockey team, since the present emblem was adopted in 1896. The emblem is shaped like a shield divided into three distinct fields, coloured yellow, red, and blue, with the inscription "D.I.F." appearing in red within the central field. According to a poem by Johan af Klercker from 1908, blue and yellow stand for Sweden and red stands for love.

An early jersey worn by the ice hockey team was dark blue with a white horizontal stripe with the letters "DIF" across it. The design was reintroduced as a commemorative jersey in March 2022 to mark the centenary of the ice hockey section, founded in 1922. Blue has remained the club's primary colour, reflected in the jerseys of its various sporting sections, including ice hockey. Televised games in the late 1960s increased the visibility of team jerseys and led to the introduction of advertising. Löfbergs Lila, a coffee roastery, sponsored the team in the late 1980s which resulted in Djurgården changing the jersey colours to yellow and purple, reflecting the sponsor's name "lila", meaning purple in Swedish. While blue has been the most frequently used colour for the jerseys, red and white has also been used, often for away games.

=== Nicknames ===
The most common nicknames for the team are "Järnkaminerna" (lit. 'The Iron Stoves'), "Stockholms stolthet" (lit. 'The Pride of Stockholm') and "Mesta mästarna" (lit. 'The Winners of Most Championships').

The nickname "Mesta mästarna" refers to Djurgården’s record number of Swedish championships, 16 in total. Järnkaminerna stems from the 1950s, when Djurgården's football team was renowned for its physical style of play.

=== Rivalries ===
The main rival of Djurgården is AIK. The clubs were founded in Stockholm in 1891 only three weeks apart, and matches between them are known as the Tvillingderbyt ("the Twin Derby"), referring to the near-simultaneous founding of the two clubs. For security reasons, derbies between Djurgården and AIK have been played without away supporters present. Färjestad BK of Karlstad has been a frequent opponent in the Swedish championship finals, with matchups in 1983, 1990, 1991, 1998 and 2001.

=== Supporters ===
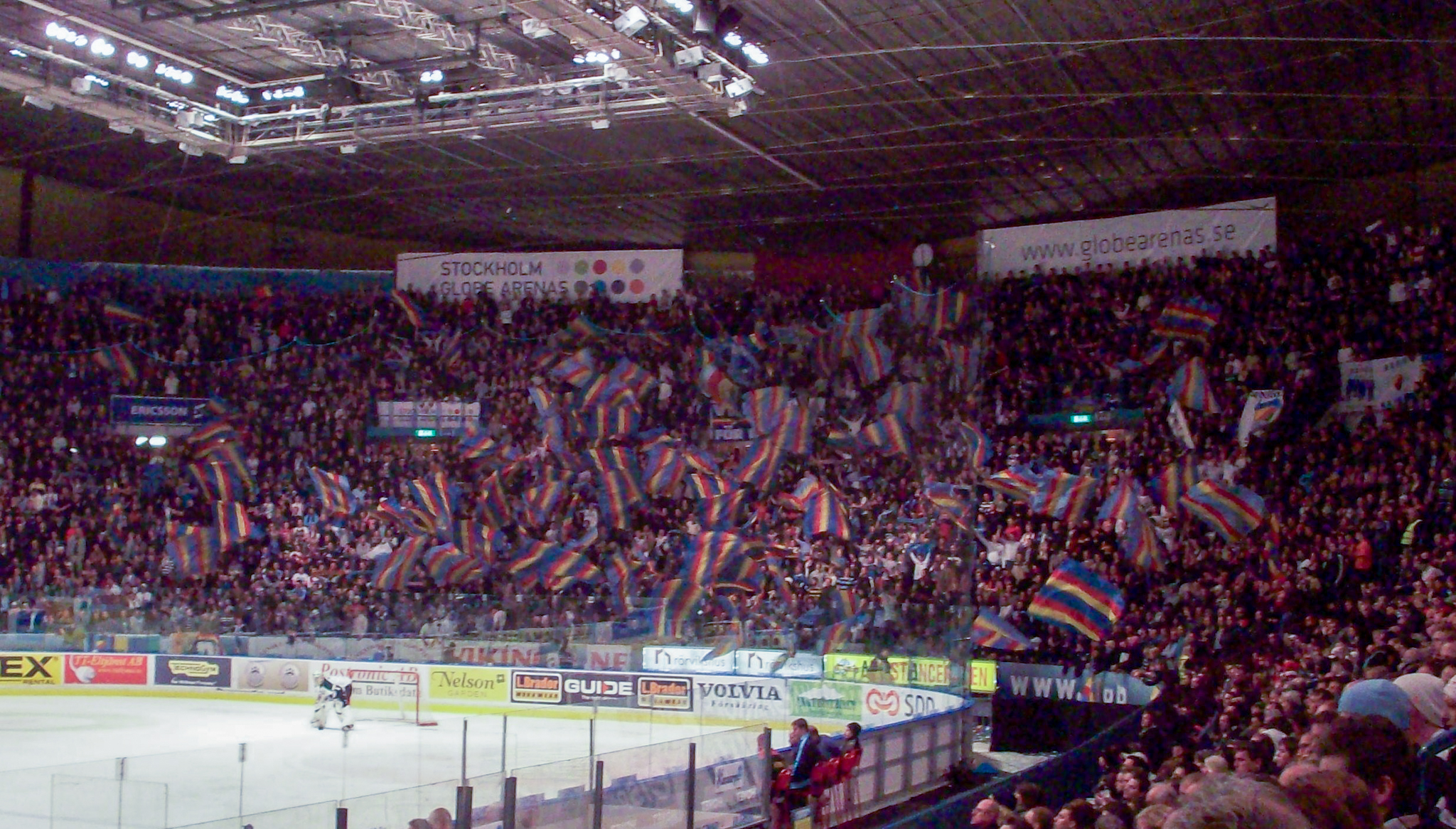
Supporters displaying flags on the supporter section at Hovet in January 2010.

Supporters of Djurgården first started to organise in 1947, when Djurgårdens Supporters Club was formed. During the late 1970s, younger fans broke away from the supporters club and established singing sections at Hovet, drawing inspiration from British supporter culture. When the seating was installed at the singing sections at the arena, the supporters were prompted to establish a new supporters' club, named as Blue Saints in 1981, to protest the change. The name came from the song When the Saints Go Marching In which was sung by Djurgården supporters when the team entered the arena in their blue jerseys. The supporters' club became associated with violence in the 1980s and 1990s and it was reformed and changed name in 1997 to Järnkaminerna, hence using the old nickname for the team. In the 1990s, Djurgården sought to develop an event‑oriented culture around the sport, rather than embracing the culture of the singing sections. This led to an decline in attendance which was reversed in the late 2000s, after a cooperation between Järnkaminerna and Djurgården. Singing sections remain active, and tifos are a recurring feature at Djurgården's games.

=== Mascot ===
Djurgården has a mascot named Järnkaninen (lit. 'The Iron Rabbit'), a play on the nickname Järnkaminerna (lit. 'The Iron Stoves').

=== Broadcast ===
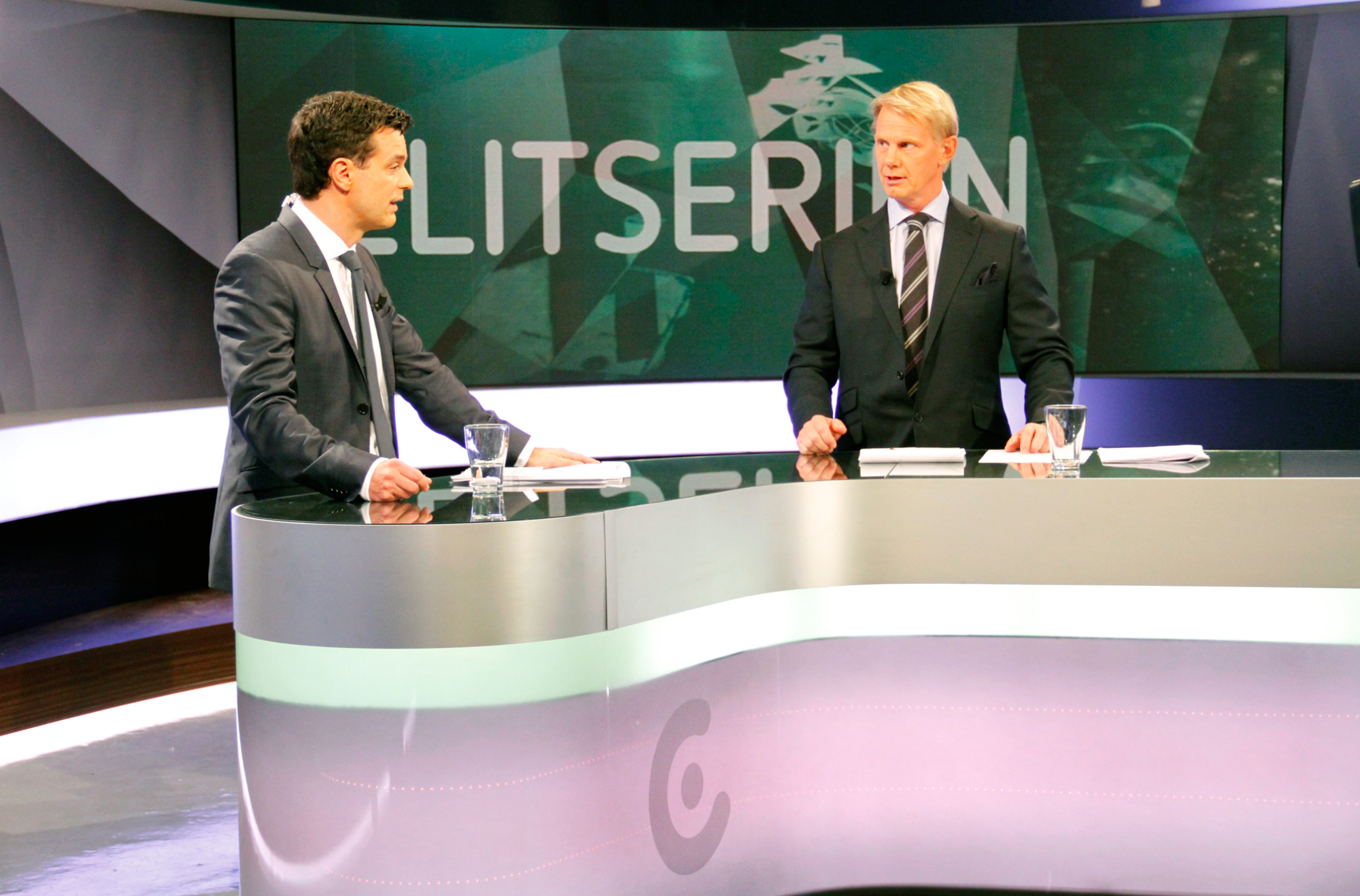
Hosts Tommy Åström and Niklas Wikegård inside the C More's ice hockey studio.

SHL games are broadcast nationally in Sweden by TV4 and streamed on TV4 Play. Selected games are shown in Finland by C More and in Norway by VG+. One game from each round is presented as the "Flagship Game" and shown on TV4 Hockey with a studio show before, between the periods and after the game. During the 2004–05 NHL lockout, SHL games were being broadcast in Canada by Rogers Sportsnet. In the beginning of the 2023–24 season it was announced that all games would be available on HomeofHockey.tv in the US, UK, Canada, Ireland, Netherlands, Italy, Belgium and Spain with one selected game having English commentary.

Sveriges Radio (SR) is the official radio broadcaster of the SHL. Each round is covered by Sportextra in SR P4 with reports from all arenas; all games are available in their entirety on SR's internet radio and to mobile phones via mobile network.

== Season-by-season results ==
This is a partial list of the last five seasons completed by Djurgården. For the full season-by-season history, see List of Djurgårdens IF Hockey seasons. Code explanation; GP—Games played, W—Wins, L—Losses, T—Tied games, GF—Goals for, GA—Goals against, Pts—Points. Top Scorer: Points (Goals+Assists)

Season	League	Regular season								Post season results	Top scorer (regular season)
Season	League	Finish	GP	W	L	T	GF	GA	Pts	Post season results	Top scorer (regular season)
2021–22	SHL	13th	52	14	27	11	130	169	58	Lost in relegation series, 0–4 (Timrå IK)	(Sweden) M. Sörensen 44 (20+24)
2022–23	HockeyAllsvenskan	4th	52	25	13	14	162	121	95	Lost in SHL qualifier finals, 3–4 (Modo Hockey)	(Sweden) M. Krüger 49 (12+37)
2023–24	HockeyAllsvenskan	4th	52	25	15	12	159	136	93	Lost in SHL qualifier finals, 0–4 (Brynäs IF)	(Sweden) L. Klasen 47 (19+28)
2024–25	HockeyAllsvenskan	1st	52	32	7	13	188	124	116	Won SHL qualifier finals, 4–1 (AIK)	(Norway) P. Thoresen 41 (14+27)
2025–26	SHL	9th	52	20	24	8	136	164	73	Lost eighth-finals, 1–2 (Malmö Redhawks)	(Canada) J. LaLeggia 40 (13+27)

== Players and personnel ==
=== Current roster ===
No.	Nat	Player	Pos	S/G	Age	Acquired	Birthplace
45	(Sweden)	Hugo Blixt	D	L	28	2024	Västerås, Sweden
53	(Sweden)	David Blomgren	LW	L	23	2022	Stockholm, Sweden
15	(Canada)	Nikolas Brouillard	D	L	31	2026	Saint-Hyacinthe, Quebec
26	(Sweden)	Lucas Carlsson	D	L	29	2026	Gävle, Sweden
20	(Norway)	Mathias Emilio Pettersen	C/LW	L	26	2025	Manglerud, Norway
17	(Sweden)	Henrik Eriksson	LW	L	36	2026	Västerhaninge, Sweden
94	(Sweden)	Sebastian Hartmann	RW	R	32	2026	Uppsala, Sweden
35	(Sweden)	Magnus Hellberg	G	L	35	2025	Uppsala, Sweden
52	(Sweden)	Philip Holm	D	L	34	2025	Stockholm, Sweden
55	(Canada)	Charles Hudon (A)	LW	L	32	2025	Alma, Quebec, Canada
46	(Sweden)	Albin Grewe	RW	L	25	2023	Märsta, Sweden
10	(Sweden)	Noel Gunler	RW	R	25	2026	Luleå, Sweden
32	(Sweden)	Marcus Krüger	C	L	36	2022	Stockholm, Sweden
28	(Sweden)	Gustav Lindström	D	R	28	2025	Östervåla, Sweden
74	(Sweden)	Daniel Marmenlind	G	L	29	2025	Märsta, Sweden
37	(Sweden)	Jesper Pettersson (A)	D	R	32	2025	Stockholm, Sweden
29	(Norway)	Håvard Østrem Salsten	LW	L	26	2025	Hamar, Norway
82	(Canada)	Colby Sissons	D	L	28	2024	Edmonton, Canada
7	(United States)	Joe Snively	C	L	30	2025	Herndon, Virginia, USA
44	(Sweden)	Lukas Vejdemo	C	L	30	2026	Stockholm, Sweden
89	(Sweden)	Oliver Wahlstrom	RW	R	26	2026	Yarmouth, Maine, USA
71	(Sweden)	Nils Åman	C	L	26	2026	Avesta, Sweden

Updated 20 October 2026

=== Team captains ===
- Leif Svensson, 1975–1976
- Stig Larsson, 1976–1979
- Mats Waltin, 1979–1982
- Håkan Eriksson, 1982–1984
- Håkan Södergren, 1984–1986
- Karl-Erik Lilja, 1986–1988
- Thomas Eriksson, 1988–1993
- Charles Berglund, 1993–1995
- Jens Öhling, 1995–1996
- Patric Kjellberg, 1996–1998
- Nichlas Falk, 1998–1999
- Charles Berglund, 1999–2001
- Nichlas Falk, 2001–2003
- Mikael Johansson, 2003–2005
- Kristofer Ottosson, 2005
- Jimmie Ölvestad, 2005–2009
- Marcus Ragnarsson, 2009–2010
- Nichlas Falk, 2010–2011
- Marcus Nilson, 2011–2012
- Timmy Pettersson, 2012–2014
- Joakim Eriksson, 2014–2015
- Henrik Eriksson, 2015–2016
- Calle Ridderwall, 2016–2018
- Andreas Engqvist, 2018–2019
- Jacob Josefson, 2019–2021
- Linus Videll, 2021
- Marcus Sörensen, 2021–2022
- Marcus Krüger, 2022–present

=== Head coaches ===
- Arne Strömberg, 1957–1960
- Vladimír Zábrodský, 1970–1971
- Carl-Göran Öberg, 1973–1975
- Hans Mild, 1975–1978
- Eilert Määttä, 1978–1979
- Bert-Ola Nordlander, 1979–1981
- Leif Boork, 1981–1984
- Gunnar Svensson, 1984–1986
- Lars-Fredrik Nyström, 1986
- Leif Boork, 1986–1987
- Ingvar Carlsson, 1987–1988
- Tommy Boustedt, 1988–1990
- Lasse Falk, 1990–1994
- Tommy Boustedt, 1994–1996
- Stephan Lundh, 1996–1997
- Niklas Wikegård, 1997–1998
- Mats Waltin,
  Hardy Nilsson, 1998–2001
- Kent Johansson, 2001–2002
- Niklas Wikegård, 2002–2005
- Hans Särkijärvi, 2005–2008
- Mikael Johansson, Tomas Montén, 2008–2009
- Hardy Nilsson, 2009–2012
- Tony Zabel, 2012
- Charles Berglund, 2012
- Tony Zabel, 2012–2014
- Hans Särkijärvi, 2014–2016
- Robert Ohlsson, 2016–2021
- Barry Smith, 2021
- Nichlas Falk, Mikael Aaro, 2021–2022
- Joakim Fagervall, 2022
- Johan Garpenlöv, 2022–2023
- Mikael Holmqvist, 2023–2024
- Robert Kimby, 2024–present

=== Honoured members ===
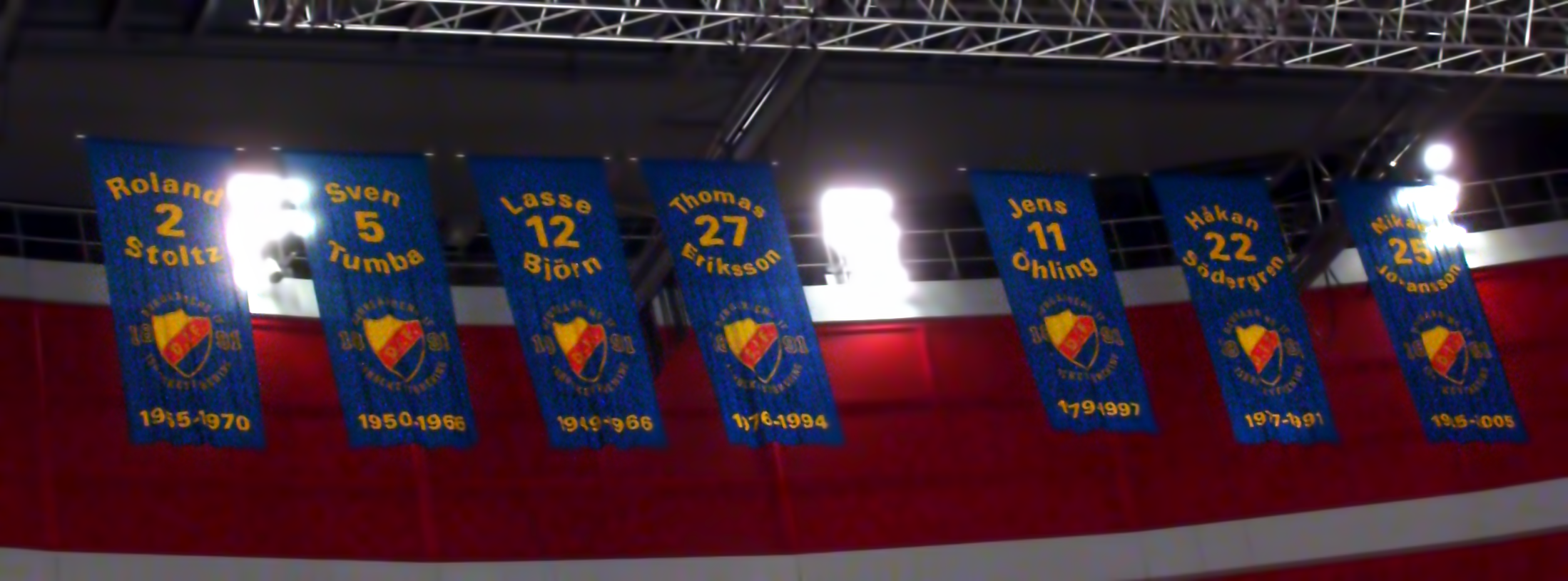
The seven banners hanging at Stockholm Globe Arena in 2010. Two additional banners have since been added.

- 2 Roland Stoltz
- 2 Charles Berglund
- 5 Sven Tumba
- 11 Jens Öhling
- 12 Lasse Björn
- 16 Nichlas Falk
- 22 Håkan Södergren
- 25 Mikael Johansson
- 27 Thomas Eriksson

==== Summary ====
Djurgården has retired the jersey numbers of nine players. The number 2 has been retired twice, for Roland Stoltz and Charles Berglund. Roland Stoltz wore the number during his 15 seasons with Djurgården between 1955 and 1970. The club later retired the number again for Charles Berglund. Berglund played 12 seasons with Djurgården and won the Swedish Championship with them five times. He was the team's captain in his four final seasons before retiring in 2001. He also won the World Championship gold medal two times (1991, 1992) as well as the Olympic gold medal once (1994). His number was retired on 24 January 2012.

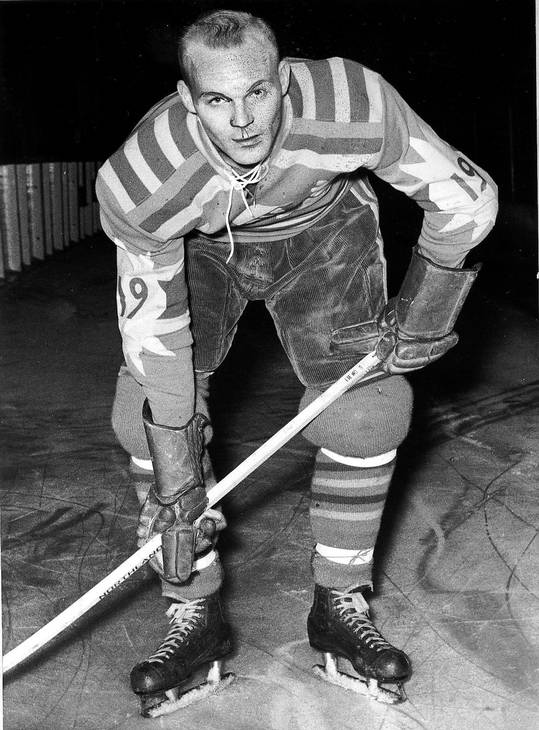
Roland "Rolle" Stoltz in 1965

The number 5 worn by Sven "Tumba" Johansson, who spent 16 seasons with Djurgården between 1950 and 1966. The number 11 worn by Jens Öhling, who spent 18 seasons with Djurgården between 1979 and 1997. His number was retired on 24 January 2002. The number 12 worn by Lasse Björn, who spent 18 seasons with Djurgården between 1949 and 1966. The number 16 worn by Nichlas Falk, who played a total of 16 seasons and 751 games with Djurgården between 1995 and 2011. Falk's number was retired on 12 October 2017. The number 22 worn by Håkan Södergren, who played 14 seasons with Djurgården between 1977 and 1991. The number 25 worn by Mikael Johansson, who joined the club in 1985. Johansson played seven seasons before joining EHC Kloten in the Swiss National League A. He returned to Djurgården in 1997 and played eight more seasons in the club. Johansson's number was retired on 15 February 2007. The number 27 worn by Thomas Eriksson, who joined Djurgården in 1976 and played four seasons before joining Philadelphia Flyers. He returned in 1981 and played two seasons before moving back to Philadelphia once more. In 1986, Eriksson returned to Djurgården and played an additional eight seasons.

Four Djurgården players and two builders have been inducted into the IIHF Hall of Fame. Arne Grunander, longtime chairman of the club, was inducted in 1997. Grunander was also the chairman of Swedish Ice Hockey Association between 1978 and 1983. Arne Strömberg, head coach of the team between 1957 and 1960, and head coach of team Sweden between 1960 and 1971. Forward Sven "Tumba" Johansson was inducted the same year, and represented team Sweden in four Olympic Games and 14 IIHF World Championships. He played a total of 245 games and scored 186 goals for the national team, which makes him team Sweden's scoring leader of all time. Defenceman Lars Björn was inducted in 1998, representing Sweden in three Olympic Games and nine World Championships. He played a total of 217 games for the national team. Defenceman Roland Stoltz was inducted in 1999, representing team Sweden in three Olympic Games and 12 World Championships. He played a total of 218 games for the national team. Forward Kent Nilsson was inducted in 2006. He joined Djurgården in 1973 and played for the team during three seasons. After 11 seasons in North America and a short stint in Italy and Switzerland, Nilsson returned to Djurgården for one season in 1988, winning the Swedish championship. He had another stint in Switzerland before playing his last and fifth season in Djurgården in 1992. Nilsson represented team Sweden in 94 games.

== Junior program ==
Djurgården operates junior teams at under-16 (U16), under-18 (J18), and under-20 (J20) levels in the national leagues. The club primarily recruits players from the Stockholm region, which is the largest ice hockey district in Sweden by number of registered youth and junior players. Since autumn 2004, Djurgården has collaborated with local upper secondary schools to offer a hockey-focused education program. The program is designed to integrate upper secondary academic studies in social science, natural science, or economics with specialized hockey training. The upper secondary school provide the academic education, while Djurgården is responsible for the athletic components. From the 2019–2020 school year, a dedicated girls' program has been included operating in parallel to the boys' program. Players from Djurgården's junior teams are regularly promoted to the senior squad.

=== Junior championships ===
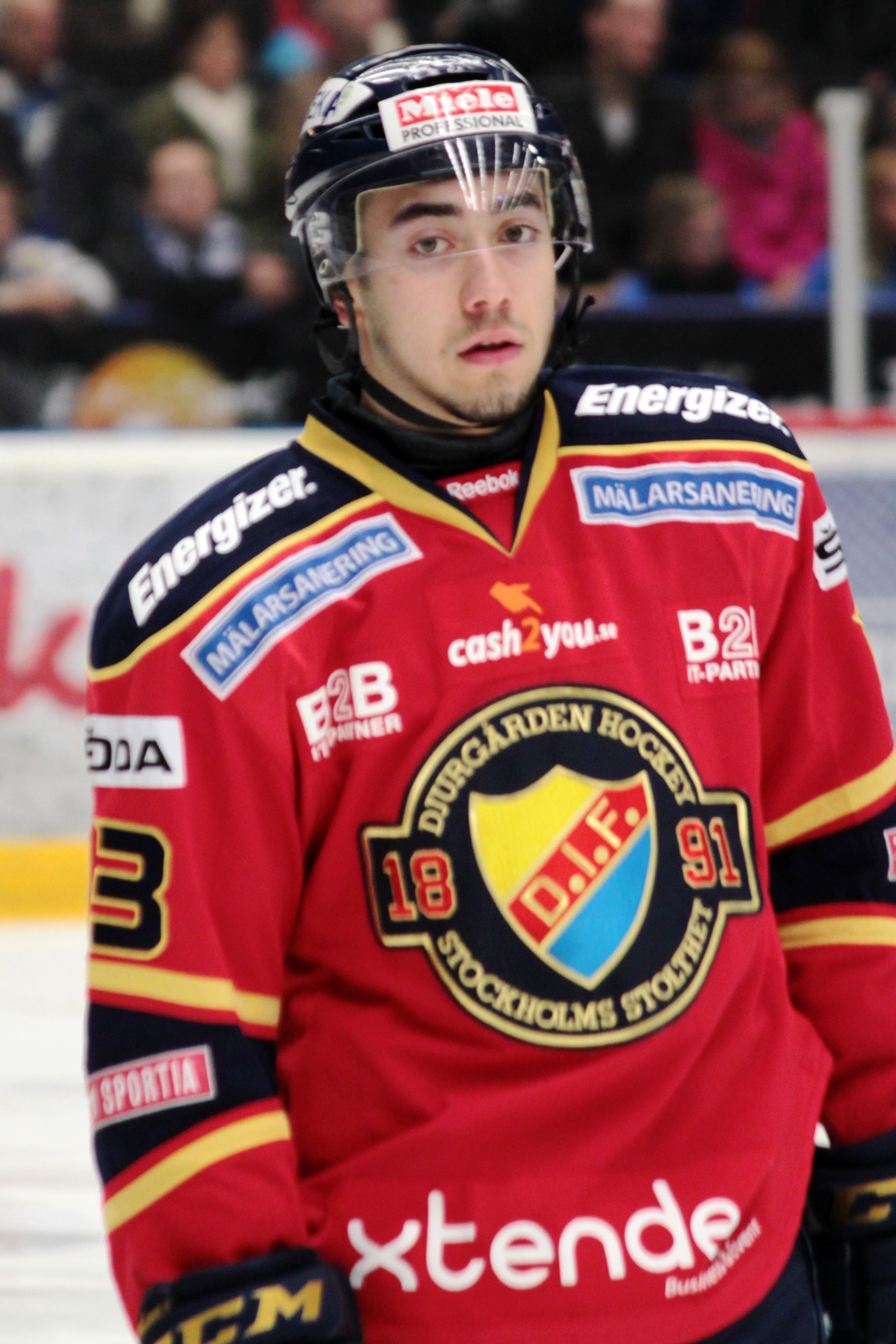
Mika Zibanejad played in both the J18 team and the J20 team before making his debut in the senior team in december 2010.

Djurgården plays in the top tier Swedish U16 league and has won the Swedish championship 12 times: 1985, 1989, 1990, 1991, 1995, 1997, 2007, 2009, 2012, 2015, 2017, and 2022.

Djurgården's J18 team plays in the top under-18 league in Sweden, called J18 Region. Djurgården has won the Swedish J18 Championship four times: in 2008, 2018, 2022, and 2025. The 2008 team included future NHL players such as Jacob Josefson, Marcus Krüger, and Gabriel Landeskog.

Djurgården's J20 team competes in the highest-level junior ice hockey league in Sweden, J20 Nationell. Djurgården's J20 team has won the Swedish championship six times, in 1953, 1988, 2015, 2016, 2025 and 2026, and received the Anton Cup on each occasion. Notable players from these championship-winning teams include Mats Sundin and Tommy Söderström from the 1988 team, and Axel Jonsson-Fjällby and Andreas Englund, from the 2016 team.

=== NHL alumni ===
By 2026, 84 players from Djurgården's organisation had been selected in the NHL entry draft. Many of these players developed through the club's junior teams. Sören Johansson was the first Djurgården player to be selected in an NHL draft, when Kansas City Scouts selected him in the 1974 NHL amateur draft, and the third Swede overall. Of the 82 players, 14 have been drafted in the first round as of 2025, as listed in the tables below.

Player	Draft year	Overall pick
Anton Frondell	2025	3rd
Mika Zibanejad	2011	6th
William Eklund	2021	7th
Alexander Holtz	2020	7th
Viggo Björck	2026	8th
Alexander Wennberg	2013	14th
Jonathan Lekkerimäki	2022	15th
Noah Östlund	2022	16th

Player	Draft year	Overall pick
Victor Eklund	2025	16th
Michael Holmqvist	1997	18th
Liam Öhgren	2022	19th
Jacob Josefson	2009	20th
Marcus Nilson	1996	20th
Tobias Björnfot	2019	22nd
Marcus Nordmark	2026	28th
Niklas Kronwall	2000	29th

Notably, Jonathan Lekkerimäki, Noah Östlund and Liam Öhgren were all drafted in the first round of the 2022 NHL entry draft. Marcus Nilson was selected in the first round, 20th overall, in the 1996 NHL entry draft. Nearly three decades later, his son Eric Nilson was drafted 45th overall in the second round of the 2025 NHL entry draft.

Mats Sundin was drafted 1st overall in the 1989 NHL entry draft. Although officially on loan to the lower-league affiliate Nacka HK during the 1988–89 season, he remained part of Djurgården's organisation prior to the draft. He became the first European player ever selected first overall.

== Arenas ==
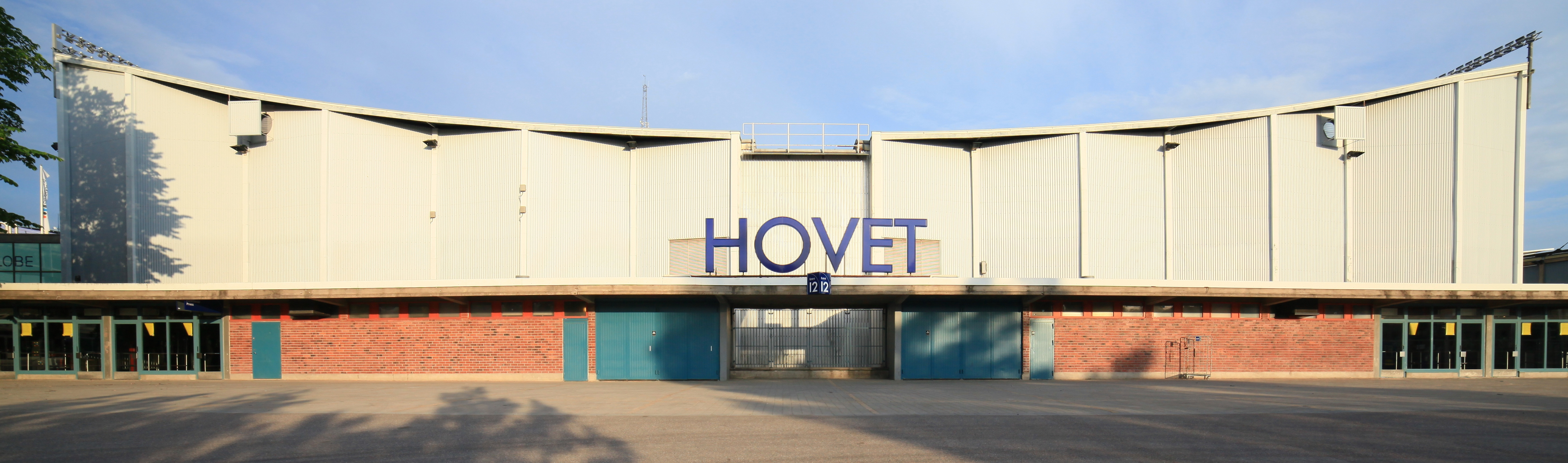
Hovet, main entrance

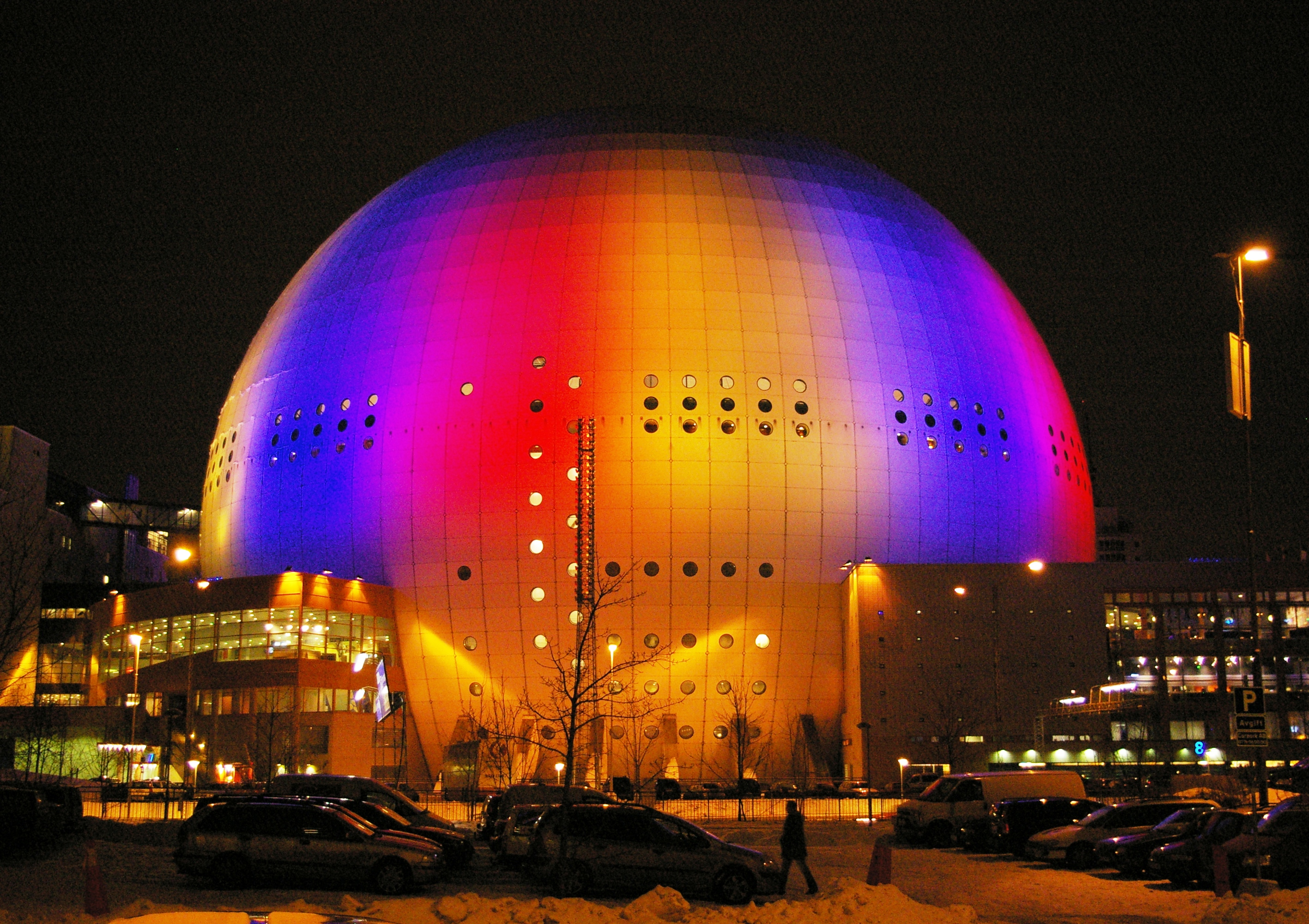
The Globe Arena lit in Djurgården's colours

In the team's early years, Djurgården used Östermalms IP as its ice hockey arena, as well as Lindarängen ice palace, the first indoor artificial ice rink in Sweden which was established in 1931. In 1938, artificial ice rink was built at Stockholm Olympic Stadium and replaced the ice palace's artificial ice rink. This was used during 1940s as this was the only artificial ice rink in Sweden. The natural ice rink at Östermalms IP was used by Djurgården until 1954.

Hovet, previously known as Johanneshovs Isstadion, opened in 1955 as an outdoor arena and Djurgården began playing there starting with the championship finals the same year. A roof was completed in 1962, making it the largest indoor arena in Sweden at the time. From its opening, Djurgården played their home games at Hovet, which served as their primary venue for over three decades. This continued until the construction of the Stockholm Globe Arena, later known as Avicii Arena, which broke ground in 1986 and was completed two and a half years later on 19 February 1989. Djurgården's first game in the new arena was played just two days later against archrival AIK, resulting in a 3–2 victory for Djurgården. The Globe Arena was then used throughout the 1990s and early 2000s as the main arena.

For the 2007–08 season, Djurgården changed their official home ice from the Stockholm Globe Arena to their smaller, former home arena, Hovet. This was much due to Djurgården being unable to fill the 13,850 seat Globe Arena. Hovet, on the other hand, seats 8,094 spectators. Nevertheless, a significant minority of the games was scheduled for the larger arena, just like some games were played on Hovet during the Globe era. For the 2008–09 season all games were played at Hovet. With few exceptions, such as derbies and playoff games, Hovet has since been the main arena for Djurgården.

The Globe arena underwent an overhaul during 2024, and the arena reopened in early 2025, with a slightly expanded capacity, increasing by 100 seats to a total of 13,950. Hovet was planned to be demolished, with only a practice rink remaining in its place. In October 2025, the previous decision was reversed, and Hovet is now set to remain in use until sometime in the 2030s.

== Club records and leaders ==
=== Scoring leaders ===
The following is a list of the top ten-point scorers for Djurgårdens IF in the regular season since the 1975–76 season, which was the inaugural Elitserien season. Figures are updated after each completed season.

Note: Pos = Position; GP = Games played; G = Goals; A = Assists; Pts = Points; P/G = Points per game

Points
Fredrik Bremberg	RW	688	197	337	534	.78
Mikael Johansson	C	700	174	346	520	.74
Jens Öhling	LW	665	216	214	430	.65
Nichlas Falk	C	816	107	276	383	.47
Håkan Södergren	LW	465	144	212	356	.76
Peter Nilsson	C	510	140	201	341	.67
Kristofer Ottosson	C	649	163	170	333	.51
Jan Viktorsson	C	584	163	167	330	.56
Charles Berglund	C	584	105	212	317	.54
Thomas Eriksson	D	512	129	146	275	.54

== Trophies and awards ==
=== Team ===
- Le Mat Trophy (16): 1926, 1950, 1954, 1955, 1958, 1959, 1960, 1961, 1962, 1963, 1983, 1989, 1990, 1991, 2000, 2001
- European Cup (2): 1990, 1991
- European trophy (1): 2009
- Tampere cup (2): 1990, 2000

=== Individual ===
Coach of the Year

- Hardy Nilsson: 1999–2000, 2009–10

Guldhjälmen

- Tommy Söderström: 1997–98
- Fredrik Bremberg: 2006–07
- Jacob Josefson: 2018–19

Guldpucken

- Roland Stoltz: 1958–59
- Anders Kallur: 1978–79
- Håkan Södergren: 1986–87
- Kent Nilsson: 1988–89
- Rolf Ridderwall: 1989–90
- Mikael Johansson: 1999–2000

Håkan Loob Trophy

- Patric Kjellberg: 1997–98
- Emil Bemström: 2018–19

Honken Trophy

- Daniel Larsson: 2007–08
- Adam Reideborn: 2018–19
- Magnus Hellberg: 2025–26

Rinkens riddare

- Sven "Tumba" Johansson: 1963–64
- Roland Stoltz: 1965–66
- Stig Larsson: 1977–78
- Patric Kjellberg: 1997–98
- Mikael Johansson: 2000–01
- Fredrik Bremberg: 2005–06

Rookie of the Year

- Tommy Söderström: 1990–91
- Per Eklund: 1994–95
- Mikael Tellqvist: 1999–2000
- Patric Hörnqvist: 2006–07
- Daniel Larsson: 2007–08
- Marcus Sörensen: 2014–15
- Emil Bemström: 2018–19
- William Eklund: 2020–21

Swedish junior player of the year

- Niklas Kronwall: 2000–01
- Emil Bemström: 2018–19
- William Eklund: 2020–21

Preceded by Södertälje SK	Swedish ice hockey champions 1926	Succeeded by IK Göta
Preceded by IK Göta	Swedish ice hockey champions 1950	Succeeded by Hammarby IF
Preceded by Södertälje SK	Swedish ice hockey champions 1954, 1955	Succeeded by Södertälje SK
Preceded by Gävle Godtemplares IK	Swedish ice hockey champions 1958, 1959, 1960, 1961, 1962, 1963	Succeeded by Brynäs IF
Preceded by AIK	Swedish ice hockey champions 1983	Succeeded by AIK
Preceded by Färjestads BK	Swedish ice hockey champions 1989, 1990, 1991	Succeeded by Malmö IF
Preceded by Brynäs IF	Swedish ice hockey champions 2000, 2001	Succeeded by Färjestads BK
