= Stig Larsson (ice hockey) =

Swedish ice hockey player

- Born: November 22, 1947 (age 77); Nacka, Sweden
- Height: 5 ft 11 in (180 cm)
- Weight: 171 lb (78 kg; 12 st 3 lb)
- Position: Forward
- Shot: Right
- Played for: Djurgårdens IF
- Playing career: 1965–1979

Stig Larsson (born November 22, 1947) is a Swedish retired ice hockey player.

== Career ==
Larsson began playing hockey in Nacka SK, but joined Djurgårdens IF, where he played until he ended his career. He was part of Sweden's 1972 World Championship team that won bronze. Larsson became team captain for the 1976–77 season.

Larsson was awarded "Rinkens Riddare", as the gentleman of the 1977–78 season. When he ended his playing career in 1979, Mats Waltin succeeded him as team captain. Larsson worked as an assistant coach under Bert-Ola Nordlander during the 1980–81 season.

Stig Larsson
Medal record

Men's ice hockey

World Championships
Bronze medal – third place	1972	Team

== Career statistics ==
			Regular Season					Playoffs
Season	Team	League	GP	G	A	Pts	PIM	GP	G	A	Pts	PIM
1965–66	Djurgårdens IF	Division 1	1	0	0	0	0	—	—	—	—	—
1966–67	Djurgårdens IF	Division 1	12	4	2	6	0	3	0	0	0	0
1967–68	Djurgårdens IF	Division 1	21	10	4	14	4	7	4	0	4	4
1968–69	Djurgårdens IF	Division 1	20	8	6	14	6	—	—	—	—	—
1969–70	Djurgårdens IF	Division 1	14	9	3	12	6	6	3	4	7	0
1970–71	Djurgårdens IF	Division 1	14	15	6	21	0	6	6	1	7	0
1971–72	Djurgårdens IF	Division 1	11	2	7	9	6	7	2	0	2	0
1972–73	Djurgårdens IF	Division 1	14	11	7	18	4	14	3	4	7	2
1973–74	Djurgårdens IF	Division 1	13	4	3	7	0	14	5	1	6	8
1974–75	Djurgårdens IF	Division 1	30	14	9	23	8	—	—	—	—	—
1974–75	Djurgårdens IF	Kvalserien	5	1	1	2	0	—	—	—	—	—
1975–76	Djurgårdens IF	Elitserien	33	15	12	27	15	—	—	—	—	—
1976–77	Djurgårdens IF	Division 1	29	24	28	52	8	—	—	—	—	—
1976–77	Djurgårdens IF	Kvalserien	9	6	2	8	6	—	—	—	—	—
1977–78	Djurgårdens IF	Elitserien	33	15	7	22	12	—	—	—	—	—
1978–79	Djurgårdens IF	Elitserien	15	5	2	7	6	5	1	1	2	0
