= Ingvar Carlsson (ice hockey) =

Swedish ice hockey player and coach

- Born: 16 September 1942 (age 84)
- Played for: IFK Lidingö

Ingvar Åke "Putte" Carlsson (born 16 September 1942) is a retired Swedish ice hockey player and head coach.

== Career ==
Carlsson played ice hockey for IFK Lidingö in the 1960s and 1970s. After his active career he took up coaching. As an assistant coach, he worked with Leif Boork and managed to lead Djurgården to the Le Mat-trophy in 1983. He became head coach for Djurgården during the 1987–88 season along with assistant coach Lasse Falk. The team became league champions, but was beaten by AIK in the quarterfinals. Carlsson most commonly used tactic was the Neutral zone trap, also known as "1–3–1" in Sweden. After his coaching career, Carlsson became Djurgården's general manager until he became general manager in Djurgården's football department in 2000. He kept his position as general manager until the beginning of 2003.

Carlsson played bandy with Djurgårdens IF Bandy in the 1962 and 1963 seasons.
