= Nichlas Falk =

Swedish ice hockey player and coach

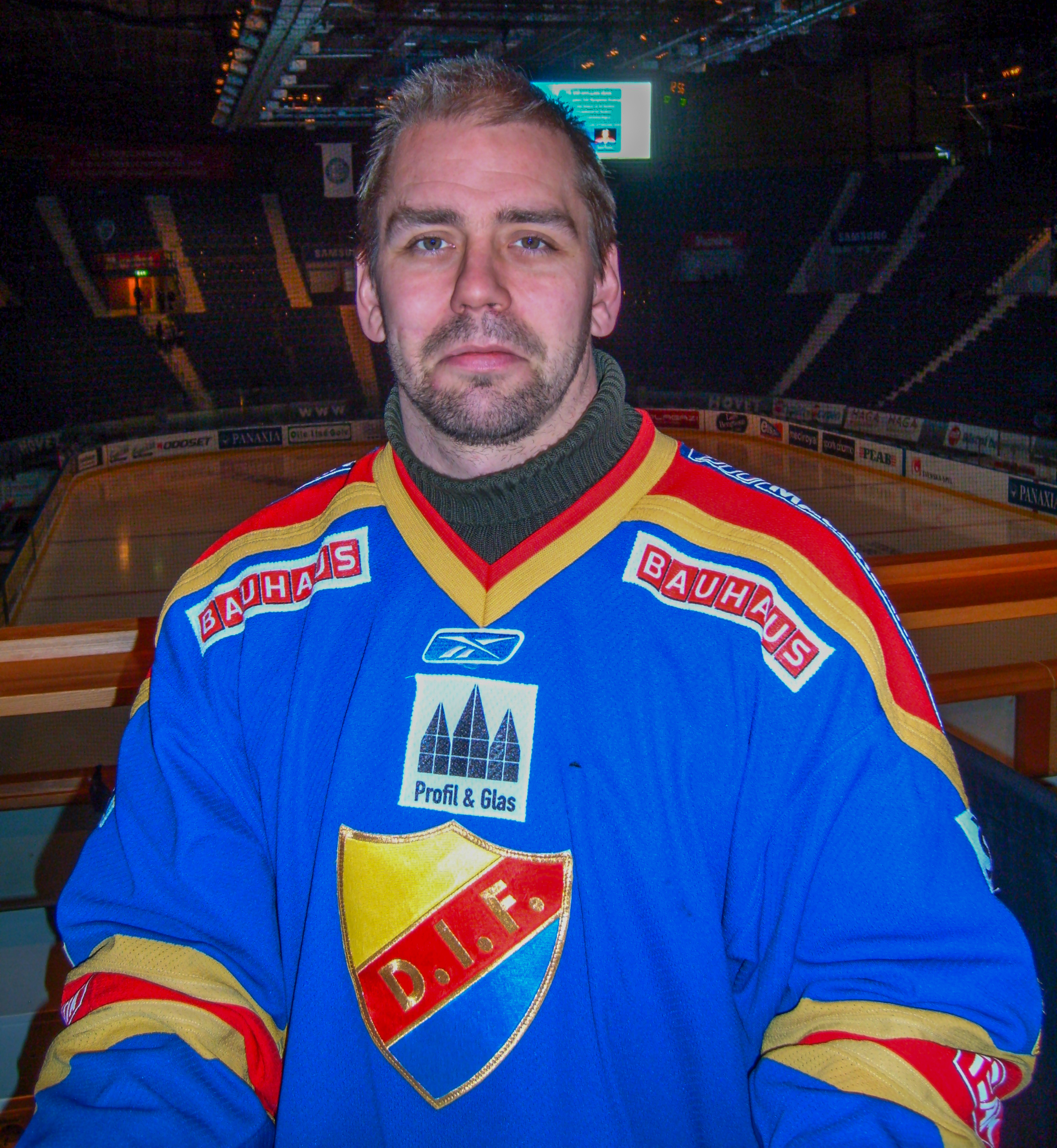
- Born: February 3, 1971 (age 54) Stockholm, Sweden
- Height: 6 ft 0 in (183 cm)
- Weight: 205 lb (93 kg; 14 st 9 lb)
- Position: Centre
- Shot: Left
- Played for: Djurgårdens IF (Elitserien)
- Playing career: 1995–2011

Per Nichlas Falk (born 3 February 1971) is a Swedish former professional ice hockey player.

Falk played almost his entire career with the Djurgården team in the Elitserien. He won two Swedish Championships (2000, 2001) with the club before he officially announced his retirement as a player on April 19, 2011. In the years 2000, 2001 and 2004 he had the best face-off winning percentage in the entire league's regular season.

Falk has, following his retirement in 2011, had numerous staff positions in professional Swedish ice hockey organisations. Most notably as an assistant coach for Djurgårdens IF on two separate occasions, 2011-12 and 2021-22, while the team played in the highest division of Swedish ice-hockey, currently named SHL.

== Career statistics ==
			Regular season					Playoffs
Season	Team	League	GP	G	A	Pts	PIM	GP	G	A	Pts	PIM
1988–89	Huddinge IK	Division 1	2	0	0	0	0	—	—	—	—	—
1989–90	Huddinge IK	Division 1	36	12	10	22	18	5	0	0	0	2
1990–91	Huddinge IK	Division 1	35	9	14	23	37	2	0	0	0	0
1991–92	Huddinge IK	Division 1	36	13	19	32	20	4	2	1	3	4
1992–93	Huddinge IK	Division 1	36	12	27	39	16	4	0	1	1	0
1993–94	Huddinge IK	Division 1	39	20	14	34	36	2	1	0	1	0
1994–95	Huddinge IK	Division 1	36	11	27	38	28	2	0	0	0	0
1995–96	Djurgårdens IF	Elitserien	39	2	7	9	14	2	0	1	1	0
1996–97	Djurgårdens IF	Elitserien	45	8	21	29	14	4	1	0	1	4
1997–98	Djurgårdens IF	Elitserien	46	11	10	21	22	15	2	8	10	6
1998–99	Djurgårdens IF	Elitserien	49	8	24	32	12	4	1	0	1	14
1999–00	Djurgårdens IF	Elitserien	49	4	23	27	18	13	2	5	7	4
2000–01	Djurgårdens IF	Elitserien	46	6	25	31	14	16	4	11	15	4
2001–02	Djurgårdens IF	Elitserien	44	10	17	27	10	5	1	0	1	0
2002–03	Djurgårdens IF	Elitserien	48	7	9	16	32	12	2	6	8	6
2003–04	Djurgårdens IF	Elitserien	42	6	13	19	20	4	0	1	1	0
2004–05	Djurgårdens IF	Elitserien	43	2	9	11	26	12	0	1	1	4
2005–06	Djurgårdens IF	Elitserien	50	7	17	24	34	—	—	—	—	—
2006–07	Djurgårdens IF	Elitserien	54	7	14	21	40	—	—	—	—	—
2007–08	Djurgårdens IF	Elitserien	46	9	9	18	20	5	0	0	0	8
2008–09	Djurgårdens IF	Elitserien	53	2	23	25	20	—	—	—	—	—
2009–10	Djurgårdens IF	Elitserien	53	2	20	22	38	16	3	2	5	4
2010–11	Djurgårdens IF	Elitserien	44	3	3	6	12	7	0	0	0	2
Elitserien totals			751	94	244	338	346	115	16	35	51	56
Division 1 totals			220	77	111	188	155	19	3	2	5	6
