= Boustedt =

Boustedt is a Swedish surname. Notable people with the surname include:

- Bo Boustedt (1868–1939), Swedish Army lieutenant general
- Christer Boustedt (1939–1986), Swedish musician and actor
- Tommy Boustedt (born 1959), Swedish hockey coach
