= Hans Särkijärvi =

Swedish ice hockey player

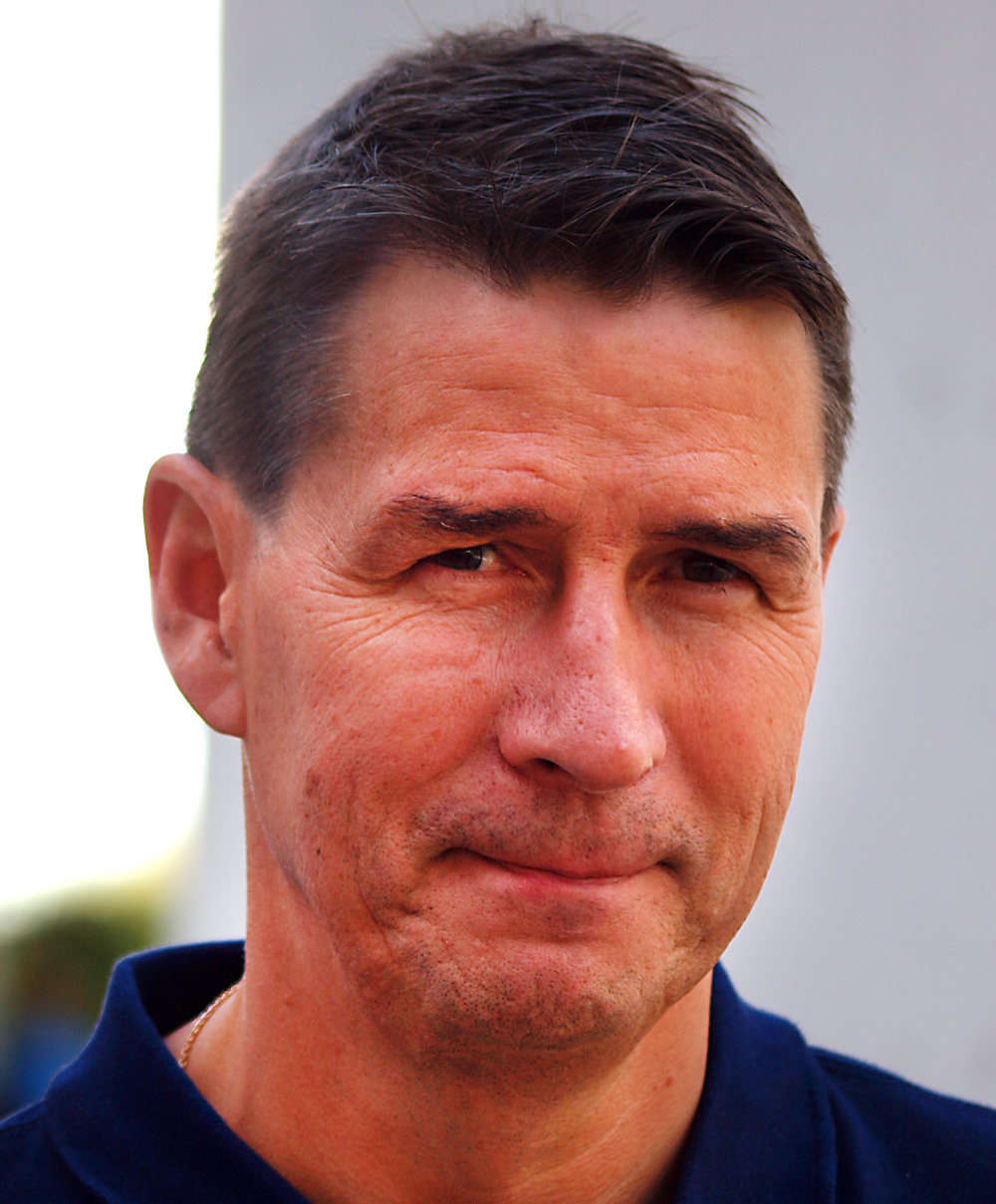
- Särkijärvi in 2010
- Born: March 3, 1957 (age 68); Kiruna, Sweden
- Height: 5 ft 10 in (178 cm)
- Weight: 179 lb (81 kg; 12 st 11 lb)
- Position: Forward
- Shot: Left
- Played for: Djurgårdens IF; Södertälje SK
- Playing career: 1973–1991

Hans Särkijärvi (born March 3, 1957) is a Swedish ice hockey coach and former player. Särkijärvi started his playing career in his hometown team Kiruna AIF in 1973. He only played a few games in the senior team before moving to Stockholm-based Djurgårdens IF. The eight seasons he spent in Djurgården included a Swedish championship in 1983. Särkijärvi joined Södertälje SK for the 1983–84 season, where he also won a Swedish championship in 1985. After six seasons in Södertälje, Särkijärvi ended his elite playing career and started to play in Sollefteå HK, where he only stayed for one season. The last club he played for was IFK Lidingö during the 1990–91 season. He is currently the head coach of the tier 3 team Visby/Roma HK.

Särkijärvi coached Södertälje along with Johan Hemlin during two seasons. However, the poor results at the beginning of the 2002–03 season, which was their third season, made the two coaches leave the club. Särkijärvi took the job as coach for Djurgården's under-18 team for the 2004–05 season. He then replaced Niklas Wikegård in the senior team for the following season. He left his position as coach of Djurgården after the 2007–08 season. On 19 March 2008 he became head coach of Skellefteå AIK. He left after two seasons, and before the 2010–11 season he signed as the head coach of Linköpings HC. He was fired from the club during the 2011–12 mid-season, and was replaced by Harald Lückner.

After his stint with Linköping, he went back to Djurgården and trained the junior team. In January 2014, he was promoted to head coach of the senior team when Tony Zabel left.

He was a major part of the team's success and way back to Swedish Hockey League.

== Career statistics ==
			Regular Season					Playoffs
Season	Team	League	GP	G	A	Pts	PIM	GP	G	A	Pts	PIM
1973–74	Kiruna AIF	Allsvenskan	6	2	3	5	2	—	—	—	—	—
1975–76	Djurgårdens IF	Elitserien	29	11	6	17	16	—	—	—	—	—
1976–77	Djurgårdens IF	Division 1	32	21	21	42	25	10	5	3	8	14
1976–77	Djurgårdens IF	Kvalserien	10	5	3	8	14	—	—	—	—	—
1977–78	Djurgårdens IF	Elitserien	32	8	5	13	42	—	—	—	—	—
1978–79	Djurgårdens IF	Elitserien	32	22	4	26	36	6	1	1	2	2
1979–80	Djurgårdens IF	Elitserien	36	15	4	19	50	—	—	—	—	—
1980–81	Djurgårdens IF	Elitserien	35	10	6	16	43	—	—	—	—	—
1981–82	Djurgårdens IF	Elitserien	30	3	4	7	51	—	—	—	—	—
1981–82	Djurgårdens IF	Kvalserien	6	1	1	2	8	—	—	—	—	—
1982–83	Djurgårdens IF	Elitserien	34	12	10	22	28	8	1	4	5	2
1983–84	Södertälje SK	Elitserien	35	10	8	18	30	3	1	1	2	0
1984–85	Södertälje SK	Elitserien	36	8	9	17	38	8	5	5	10	8
1985–86	Södertälje SK	Elitserien	25	10	13	23	16	7	0	2	2	10
1986–87	Södertälje SK	Elitserien	31	8	6	14	48	—	—	—	—	—
1987–88	Södertälje SK	Elitserien	36	8	6	14	24	2	0	1	1	2
1988–89	Södertälje SK	Elitserien	30	3	8	11	22	2	1	0	1	0
1989–90	Sollefteå HK	Division 1	32	20	13	33	53	—	—	—	—	—
1990–91	IFK Lidingö	Division 1	22	8	7	15	22	—	—	—	—	—
