= Charles Berglund =

Swedish ice hockey player and coach

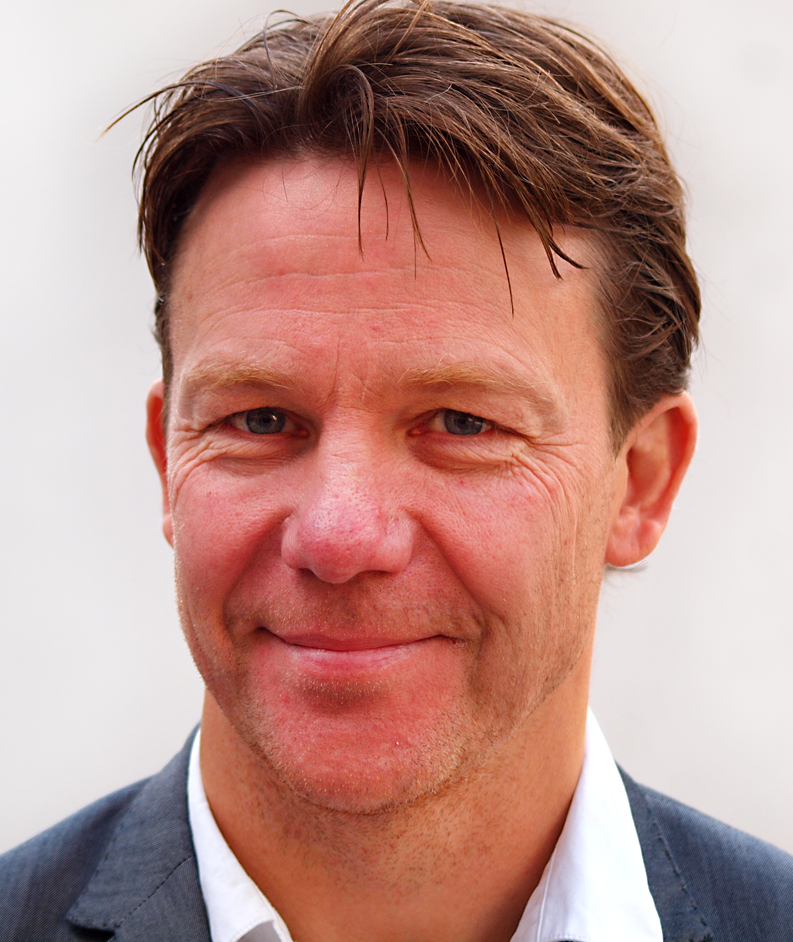
- Charles Berglund in September 2010
- Born: 18 January 1965 (age 61) Stockholm, Sweden
- Height: 5 ft 9 in (175 cm)
- Weight: 176 lb (80 kg; 12 st 8 lb)
- Position: Centre
- Shot: Left
- Played for: Djurgårdens IF; Kloten Flyers
- National team: Sweden
- Playing career: 1984–2001
Medal record
Men's ice hockey
Representing Sweden
Olympic Games
Gold medal – first place	1994 Lillehammer	Team
World Championships
Gold medal – first place	1991 Finland	Team
Silver medal – second place	1993 Germany	Team
Bronze medal – third place	1994 Italy	Team
Silver medal – second place	1995 Sweden	Team

Ralph Douglas Charles "Challe" Berglund (born 18 January 1965) is a Swedish former ice hockey player and coach.

== Biography ==
Berglund was born in Stockholm, Sweden. He played 12 seasons for Djurgårdens IF of the Elitserien and won five Swedish Championships with Djurgården in 1989, 1990, 1991, 2000 and 2001. He also received silver in 1992 and 1998. The last seasons of his career he was the team captain. He is highly appreciated and loved by the supporters of Djurgården (i.e. Järnkaminerna) for being so devoted to the club and its supporters.

Berglund earned 142 caps for the Swedish national team. He won both the World Championship gold in 1991 and the Olympic gold in 1994. In 1996, he also won the Swiss Championship with EHC Kloten.

Berglund has also been appearing on Swedish TV4 as an expert commentator for harness racing, which is also his favorite hobby.

Berglund has been coaching Djurgårdens IF, Timrå IK and Modo Hockey of the Elitserien. He coached Djurgården for two seasons before leaving the team in 2007 to coach Timrå. He coached Timrå for three seasons before leaving the team in 2010 to coach Modo. Berglund was forced to leave Modo in 2011 after only one season, mainly because the team finished 12th in Elitserien and therefore had to play in the 2011 Kvalserien to remain in Elitserien.

Berglund's No. 2 Djurgården jersey was retired and raised to the rafters at Hovet on 24 January 2012, prior to a home game against Färjestad BK which Djurgården won 2–1 after a shootout.

On 12 May 2011, Berglund said in an interview that he would take a one-year break from coaching, after declining an offer from IF Sundsvall Hockey. On 6 August 2011, Berglund signed with the sports channel Viasat Hockey as a color commentator for HockeyAllsvenskan and Kvalserien. Berglund cancelled his contract with Viasat on 6 March 2012, as Djurgården were forced to play in the 2012 Kvalserien. As a result, Djurgården called Berglund up as the team's new head coach to help save them in the highest division. Although the team was relegated to HockeyAllsvenskan, the plan was for Berglund to remain as head coach for the team throughout the 2013–14 season, and also to work as general manager for Djurgården. However, after weak results Berglund stepped down as head coach in November 2012, remaining as general manager for two more years until August 2014.

== Clubs ==
- Djurgårdens IF juniors, 1982–1984
- Huddinge IK (1984–1986)
- Nacka HK (1986–1987)
- Djurgårdens IF (1987–1995)
- EHC Kloten (1995–1997)
- Djurgårdens IF (1997–2001)

== Coaching career ==
- Väsby IK Hockey (2004–2005)
- Djurgårdens IF (2005–2007) (assisting coach)
- Timrå IK (2007–2010)
- Modo Hockey (2010–2011)
- Djurgårdens IF (2012–2013) (head coach and general manager)
- HV71 (2023) (assisting coach)
- Leksands IF (2023–) (head coach)

== Medals ==
- Olympic gold 1994
- WC gold 1991
- WC silver 1993, 1995
- WC bronze 1994
- Swedish Champion in 1989, 1990, 1991, 2000, 2001
- Canada Cup, 3rd 1991
- Europateamcup gold 1991, 1992
- Swiss gold 1996

== Career statistics ==
=== Regular season and playoffs ===
			Regular season					Playoffs
Season	Team	League	GP	G	A	Pts	PIM	GP	G	A	Pts	PIM
1984–85	Huddinge IK	SWE.2	13	3	3	6	4	—	0	0	0	—
1985–86	Huddinge IK	SWE.2	16	2	4	6	10	—	—	—	—	—
1985–86	Huddinge IK	Allsv	14	4	2	6	8	6	2	0	2	0
1986–87	Nacka HK	SWE.2	31	5	5	10	24	—	—	—	—	—
1987–88	Djurgårdens IF	SEL	36	8	9	17	16	3	0	1	1	2
1988–89	Djurgårdens IF	SEL	36	6	17	23	20	7	0	1	1	4
1989–90	Djurgårdens IF	SEL	36	5	6	11	12	8	5	2	7	0
1990–91	Djurgårdens IF	SEL	36	9	12	21	26	7	2	2	4	0
1991–92	Djurgårdens IF	SEL	39	9	10	19	68	10	1	8	9	12
1992–93	Djurgårdens IF	SEL	40	8	9	17	38	6	0	2	2	8
1993–94	Djurgårdens IF	SEL	35	4	20	24	50	6	1	4	5	2
1994–95	Djurgårdens IF	SEL	39	11	20	31	20	3	1	3	4	4
1995–96	EHC Kloten	NDA	36	10	25	35	12	10	1	4	5	4
1996–97	EHC Kloten	NDA	46	16	17	33	28	4	1	2	3	0
1997–98	Djurgårdens IF	SEL	45	9	20	29	34	15	2	5	7	12
1998–99	Djurgårdens IF	SEL	47	9	22	31	40	4	1	3	4	4
1999–2000	Djurgårdens IF	SEL	50	3	15	18	54	13	1	4	5	8
2000–01	Djurgårdens IF	SEL	48	7	11	18	60	15	2	4	6	8
SEL totals			487	88	171	259	438	97	16	39	55	64

=== International ===
Year	Team	Event	GP	G	A	Pts	PIM
1991	Sweden	WC	8	1	2	3	4
1991	Sweden	CC	6	1	0	1	0
1992	Sweden	OG	8	1	1	2	2
1993	Sweden	WC	8	1	2	3	0
1994	Sweden	OG	5	0	3	3	2
1994	Sweden	WC	8	2	3	5	2
1995	Sweden	WC	8	0	2	2	2
Senior totals			51	6	13	19	12
