= Robert Kimby =

Swedish ice hockey coach (born 1984)

- Born: 11 June 1984 (age 41); Bålsta, Sweden
- Occupation: Ice hockey coach
- Years active: 2020–present
- Employer: Swedish Ice Hockey Association
- Known for: Head coach of Djurgårdens IF
- Notable work: Coaching roles at Djurgårdens IF and Almtuna IS

Robert Kimby (born 11 June 1984) is a Swedish professional ice hockey coach and former player who is the head coach for Djurgårdens IF of the Swedish Hockey League (SHL).

== Playing career ==
Kimby won the TV-pucken with team Stockholm in 1999, scoring Stockholm's second goal in the final against team Göteborg. He spent his career as a player in Hammarby IF, Nybro Vikings and Almtuna IS. When in Nybro Vikings, Kimby usually played centre.

== Coaching career ==
Kimby began his coaching career in lower-tier clubs Bålsta HC and Enköpings SK HK. Along with head coach Joakim Fagervall, Kimby led IF Björklöven as assistant coach during the 2019–20 season. Kimby signed on as head coach of Almtuna IS for the following season. He terminated his contract in April 2021 to focus on other things than hockey, but returned yet again to Almtuna a year later.

Kimby signed on as head coach for Djurgårdens IF in April 2024, after the club had failed to qualify for promotion to the Swedish Hockey League twice from HockeyAllsvenskan. He led his team to promotion from HockeyAllsvenskan to the Swedish Hockey League at the conclusion of the 2024–25 HockeyAllsvenskan season. Kimby extended his contract with Djurgården until 2028 in June 2025.
