= Bert-Ola Nordlander =

Swedish ice hockey player and coach

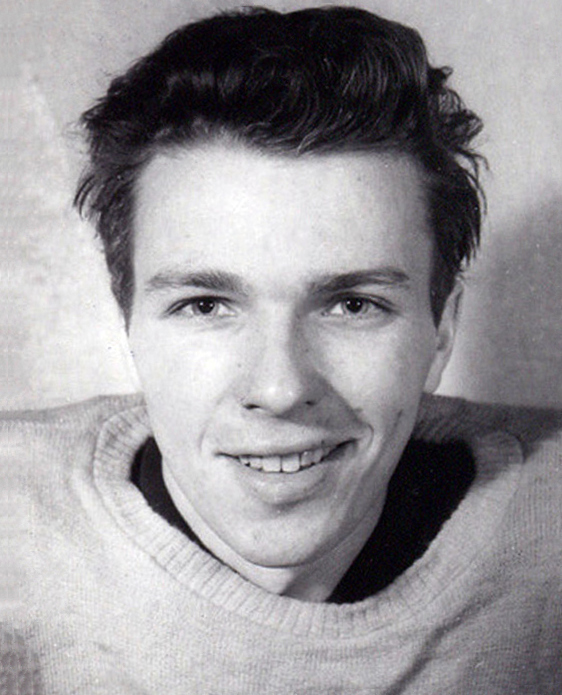
- Nordlander, circa 1960
- Born: 12 August 1938 (age 88) Sundsvall, Sweden
- Height: 5 ft 11 in (180 cm)
- Weight: 187 lb (85 kg; 13 st 5 lb)
- Position: Defence
- Shot: Left
- Played for: Wifsta/Östrand IF; AIK
- National team: Sweden
- Playing career: 1956–1972
Medal record
Representing Sweden
Olympic Games
Silver medal – second place	1964 Innsbruck	Team
World Championships
Bronze medal – third place	1971 Switzerland	Team
Silver medal – second place	1969 Stockholm	Team
Silver medal – second place	1967 Vienna	Team
Bronze medal – third place	1965 Tampere	Team
Silver medal – second place	1963 Stockholm	Team
Gold medal – first place	1962 Colorado Springs/Denver	Team

Bert-Ola Nordlander (born 12 August 1938) is a Swedish retired ice hockey player and head coach. During his career he played for Wifsta/Östrand IF and AIK. In 1967 he was awarded the Golden Puck as the best player of the season. Nordlander began his coaching career in 1976 when he signed with Hammarby IF. In 1979 he moved to Djurgårdens IF and stayed there until 1981. AIK retired the number 5 in his honour.

Nordlander also played bandy and represented Djurgårdens IF Bandy in the 1963 and 1964 seasons.

== Olympics ==
Nordlander competed as a member of the Sweden men's national ice hockey team at the 1960, 1964, 1968, and 1972 Winter Olympics. He won a silver medal in 1964, and placed fourth in 1968 and 1972.

Preceded by Nils Nilsson	Golden Puck; 1967	Succeeded by Leif Holmqvist
