= Tommy Boustedt =

Swedish ice hockey coach

- Born: 5 May 1959 (age 65)
- Occupation: ice hockey manager

Carl Tommy Boustedt (born 5 May 1959) is a Swedish ice hockey coach and sports administrator. He works as a European pro scout for the Detroit Red Wings in the NHL. He is also an advisor for the Denmark ice hockey team and a senior advisor for Hammarby IF.

Boustedt is most known for his long coaching career. He has been the head coach for Hammarby IF, Djurgårdens IF, IK Vita Hästen, Linköpings HC and Frölunda HC. He has also been an assistant coach for the Swedish national men's ice hockey team.

In 2001, Bousted joined the Swedish Ice Hockey Association as development chief. In 2014, he was promoted to Secretary-General, but left the role in 2020.

He has also been a TV analyst for Viasat, covering the Ice Hockey World Championships.
