= Lasse Falk =

Swedish ice hockey coach (born 1958)

Lasse Falk (born May 11, 1958) is a retired Swedish ice hockey coach. He coached Djurgårdens IF, Södertälje SK, and Västra Frölunda HC.
