= Leif Boork =

Swedish ice hockey coach

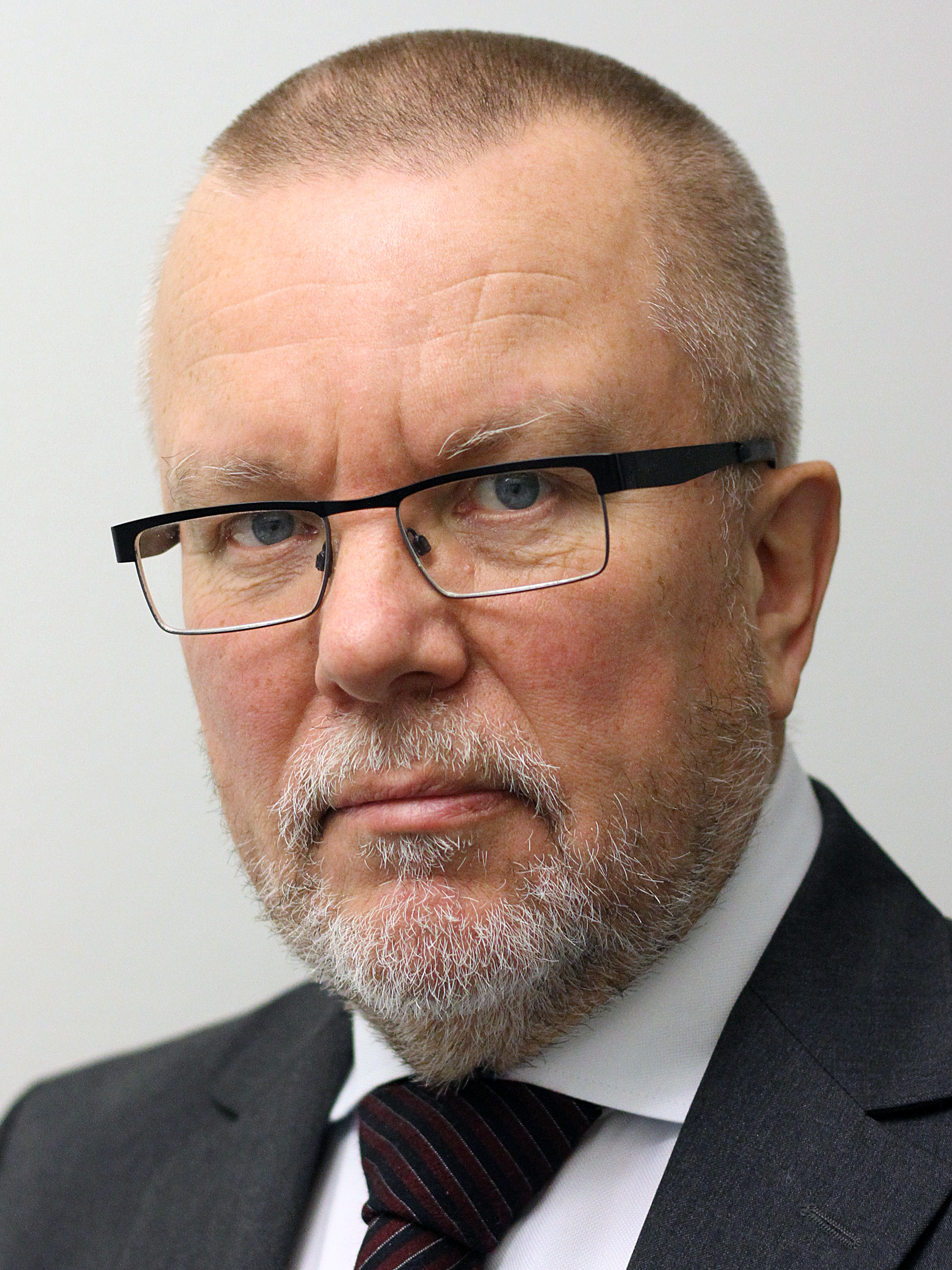
- Leif Boork in December 2011
- Born: 3 July 1949 (age 76); Stockholm, Sweden
- Occupation: ice hockey coach

Leif Erik Boork (born 3 July 1949 in Stockholm, Sweden) is a Swedish former ice hockey coach, who was the head coach for Djurgårdens IF, Brynäs IF, Almtuna IS, and Norway's national ice hockey team.

He works as a color commentator for the TV4 Group. He was the player agent of Johan Alcén, but after failing to find a new club for Alcén, they cancelled their relation to each other in July 2011.

He was head coach for Sweden women's national team until 2018. He was fired after a series of poor performances, including finishing sixth at the 2017 Women's Ice Hockey World Championships and seventh at the 2018 Winter Olympics, and mass discontent with his leadership among players, including over decisions to throw veteran Emma Eliasson off the team, allegations of bullying Jenni Asserholt into retirement, and a player petition to have him resign.

== See also ==
- 2019 Sweden women's national ice hockey team strike
