= 1999–2000 Elitserien season =

- League: Elitserien
- Sport: Ice hockey
- Duration: 15 September 1999 – 7 March 2000

Regular season
- League champion: Djurgårdens IF
- Season MVP: Mikael Johansson (Djurgårdens IF)
- Top scorer: Juha Riihijärvi (Malmö IF)

Playoffs
- Finals champions: Djurgårdens IF
- Runners-up: Modo Hockey

SHL seasons
- ← 1998–99 2000–01 →

The 1999–2000 Elitserien season was the 25th season of the Elitserien, the top level of ice hockey in Sweden. 12 teams participated in the league, and Djurgårdens IF won the championship.

== Standings ==
	Club	GP	W	OTW	SOW	SOL	OTL	L	GF	GA	Pts
1.	Djurgårdens IF	50	23	2	7	5	1	12	180	127	93
2.	Brynäs IF	50	28	1	0	5	1	15	165	134	92
3.	Västra Frölunda	50	25	2	2	5	1	15	155	131	89
4.	Luleå HF	50	25	1	5	1	1	17	158	140	89
5.	Malmö IF	50	22	2	6	5	1	14	170	131	88
6.	Modo Hockey	50	24	2	2	2	1	19	149	134	83
7.	Färjestads BK	50	22	3	2	2	3	18	168	142	81
8	HV 71 Jönköping	50	18	1	7	5	0	19	144	131	75
9.	AIK	50	19	2	3	3	4	19	151	155	74
10.	Leksands IF	50	14	1	4	5	2	24	150	174	59
11.	Västerås IK	50	9	2	4	1	3	31	103	196	43
12.	Linköpings HC	50	9	0	1	4	1	35	107	205	34

== Playoffs ==
Quarterfinal
1	Djurgårdens IF	4
7	Färjestads BK	3
4	Luleå HF	4
5	Malmö IF	2
3	Västra Frölunda	1
6	MODO Hockey	4
2	Brynäs IF	4
8	HV 71 Jönköping	2

Semifinal
1	Djurgårdens IF	3
4	Luleå HF	0
6	MODO Hockey	3
2	Brynäs IF	2

Final
1	Djurgårdens IF	3
6	MODO Hockey	0
