= Niklas Wikegård =

Swedish ice hockey player and coach

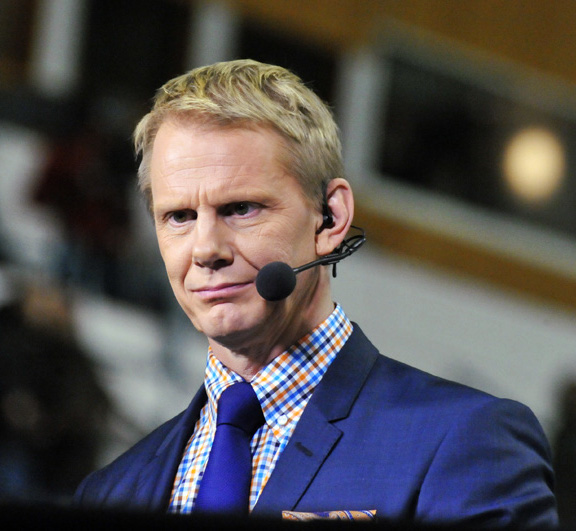
- Wikegård in March 2013
- Born: October 3, 1963 (age 63); Gävle, Sweden

Niklas Wikegård (born October 3, 1963) is a Swedish former ice hockey player, coach and color commentator. He is currently working for Djurgårdens IF as sporting manager for the club.

Wikegård was head coach for Djurgårdens IF between 2002 and 2005. He has also coached Väsby IK, Bodens IK, and Swiss team EHC Chur. He also worked as an assistant coach to Stephan Lundh in Djurgården 1996 to 1998, and in Malmö Redhawks 1998 to 2001.

In several years Wikegård worked as a color commentator for SVT during hockey games and as a co-host of the show Hockeykväll (English: Hockey Night). On May 23, 2011, SVT announced that Wikegård would leave SVT. The day later Wikegård signed a three-year-long contract with the TV4 Group. Wikegård is also working for the online gambling company Expekt.com. Niklas, as of 19 December 2023 started working, once again, for Djurgården Hockey, but this time in capacity of Sporting manager for the club in Stockholm.
