= 2010–11 Djurgårdens IF (men's hockey) season =

Swedish ice hockey club season

2010–11 Djurgårdens IF Hockey
- League: Regular: 6th Playoffs: Quarterfinals SHL
- 2010–11 record: 22–19–14
- Home record: 14–6–7
- Road record: 8–13–7
- Goals for: 140
- Goals against: 139

Team information
- General manager: Janne Järlefelt
- Coach: Hardy Nilsson
- Assistant coach: Mikael Johansson; Tomas Montén
- Captain: Nichlas Falk
- Arena: Hovet, Ericsson Globe
- Average attendance: Regular: 7,401 (2nd); Playoffs: 10,012 (1st)

Team leaders
- Goals: Mathias Tjärnqvist (17)
- Assists: Marcus Krüger (29)
- Points: Marcus Krüger (35)
- Penalty minutes: David Printz (79)

The 2010–11 Elitserien season was Djurgårdens IF Hockey's 35th season in the Swedish elite league, Elitserien. The regular season began on away ice on 16 September 2010 against HV71 and concluded on 5 March 2011 away against Timrå IK. This season saw Djurgården's attempt to win the playoffs, after losing the previous season's final.

Djurgården finished sixth in the regular season and were faced against Luleå HF in the quarterfinals. Djurgården lost the first three games, but won the three following games to tie the series 3–3. However, Luleå knocked out Djurgården in the seventh and deciding game, winning in overtime.

== Pre-season ==
Djurgården lost several prominent players to NHL, including Jacob Josefson, Gustaf Wesslau, Kyle Klubertanz and Andreas Engqvist. However, in late May Djurgården signed on the replacements. Nils Ekman returned to Djurgården after seasons in the NHL and the KHL. Josef Boumedienne signed a 1+1 deal and Stefan Lassen was acquired from Leksands IF. Former Rögle forward Mario Kempe signed on in June. Stefan Ridderwall was chosen to be the main goaltender for the season; a position he had shared with Wesslau during the previous season. Five players were brought up from Djurgården's youth program while one of them, goaltender Tim Sandberg, was loaned out to Sundsvall. Due to the uncertainty regarding Marcus Nilson's participation for the coming season, Djurgården signed Daniel Widing as a replacement in August. Two new goaltender coaches, Thomas Magnusson and Mikael Gerdén, were signed in May when former goaltender coach Jonas Forsberg decided retire from coaching.

Djurgården began the pre-season by playing in the 2010 European Trophy tournament, an extended version of the former Nordic Trophy, which Djurgården won last season. The tournament previously contained only Finnish and Swedish teams, but was in the 2010 tournament expanded to Austria, Czech Republic, Germany and Switzerland. However, Djurgården missed the European Trophy playoffs this year, ending in the fifth spot with 12 points.

=== European Trophy ===
==== Standings ====
Pos	Team	Pld	W	OTW	OTL	L	GF	GA	GD	Pts	Qualification
1	(Germany) Eisbären Berlin	8	5	1	0	2	30	21	+9	17	Qualification for the playoffs
2	(Sweden) Färjestads BK	8	5	0	0	3	26	25	+1	15	Qualification for the playoffs
3	(Finland) Jokerit	8	4	1	0	3	20	15	+5	14	Qualification for the playoffs
4	(Czech Republic) Sparta Praha	8	4	0	1	3	22	16	+6	13	
5	(Sweden) Djurgårdens IF	8	3	1	1	3	23	18	+5	12	
6	(Finland) HIFK	8	4	0	0	4	27	24	+3	12	
7	(Germany) Adler Mannheim	8	3	0	2	3	20	24	−4	11	
8	(Sweden) Linköpings HC	8	2	1	1	4	19	26	−7	9	
9	(Norway) Vålerenga IF	8	1	1	0	6	20	38	−18	5	

Updated to match(es) played on unknown. Source:

==== Game log ====
2010 European Trophy game log

Group stage: 3–3–1 (Home: 3–0–1; Road: 0–3–1)
Round	Date	Opponent	Score	Goaltender	Venue	Attendance	Record	Pts	Recap
1	13 August	Linköping	5–0	Ridderwall	Hovet	2,994	1–0–0	3
2	14 August	Färjestad	2–1	Owuya	Coffee Queen Arena	1,300	1–1–0	3
3	18 August	(Germany) Mannheim	0–3	Ridderwall	(Germany) SAP Arena	10,157	1–2–0	3
4	20 August	(Czech Republic) Sparta Praha	1–0 SO	Owuya	(Czech Republic) Tesla Arena	1,973	1–2–1	5
5	21 August	(Germany) Eisbären Berlin	2–4	Ridderwall	(Germany) O2 World	7,200	1–3–1	5
6	25 August	(Finland) HIFK	5–3	Ridderwall	Hovet	1,891	2–3–1	8
7	27 August	(Norway) Vålerenga	6–2	Owuya	Hovet	1,385	3–3–1	11
8	28 August	(Finland) Jokerit	3–4 OT	Ridderwall	Hovet	1,533	3–3–2	12

Legend: Win (3 points) Overtime/Shootout win (2 points) Loss (0 points) Overtime/Shootout loss (1 point)

==== Stats ====
Players

No	Pos	Player	GP	G	A	Pts	PIM
#1	D	(Sweden) Josef Boumedienne	8	3	5	8	12
#2	F	(Sweden) Jimmie Ölvestad	8	4	2	6	4
#3	F	(Sweden) Nils Ekman	7	0	5	5	18
#4	F	(Sweden) Daniel Widing	8	5	0	5	2
#5	C	(Sweden) Marcus Krüger	4	0	4	4	2

Goalkeepers

No	Player	GPI	MIP	SOG	GA	GAA	SVS%	SO
#1	(Sweden) Mark Owuya	4	216:50	105	5	1.38	95.24%	1
#2	(Sweden) Stefan Ridderwall	5	270:48	137	12	2.66	91.24%	1

== Regular season ==
=== Standings ===
2010–11 Elitserien season	GP	W	L	OTW/SOW	OTL/SOL	GF	GA	Pts
HV71^{y}	55	24	16	9	6	173	143	96
Färjestads BK^{x}	55	27	19	6	3	154	124	96
Skellefteå AIK^{x}	55	25	18	9	3	173	145	96
Luleå HF^{x}	55	23	21	8	3	129	115	88
Linköpings HC^{x}	55	22	19	5	9	138	118	85
Djurgårdens IF^{x}	55	22	19	4	10	140	139	84
Brynäs IF^{x}	55	19	20	8	8	147	157	81
AIK^{x}	55	20	23	4	8	131	151	76
Frölunda HC^{e}	55	19	24	5	7	128	158	74
Timrå IK^{e}	55	17	25	9	4	140	165	73
Södertälje SK^{r}	55	20	26	2	7	132	164	71
Modo Hockey^{r}	55	17	25	6	7	147	153	70

x – clinched playoff spot; y – clinched regular season league title; e – eliminated from playoff contention; r – will play in relegation series

=== Game log ===
2010–11 Elitserien Game log: 22–19–14 (Home: 14–6–7; Road: 8–13–7)

September: 1–4–1 (Home: 1–1–1; Road: 0–3–0)
Round	Date	Opponent	Score	Goaltender	Venue	Attendance	Record	Pts	Recap
1	16 September	HV71	3–2	Ridderwall	Hovet	7,246	1–0–0	3
2	18 September	Modo	2–3	Ridderwall	Fjällräven Center	6,532	1–1–0	3
3	23 September	Brynäs	2–4	Owuya	Läkerol Arena	5,381	1–2–0	3
4	25 September	Skellefteå	2–3 (SO)	Ridderwall	Hovet	6,898	1–2–1	4
5	28 September	AIK	2–5	Ridderwall	Ericsson Globe (road)	13,850	1–3–1	4
6	30 September	Luleå	2–3	Ridderwall	Hovet	5,895	1–4–1	4

October: 5–3–2 (Home: 3–0–1; Road: 2–3–1)
Round	Date	Opponent	Score	Goaltender	Venue	Attendance	Record	Pts	Recap
7	5 October	Timrå	5–2	Ridderwall	Hovet	5,519	2–4–1	7
8	7 October	Södertälje	1–3	Ridderwall	AXA Sports Center	4,744	2–5–1	7
9	9 October	Färjestad	2–1	Owuya	Löfbergs Lila Arena	7,165	3–5–1	10
10	12 October	Linköping	2–3 (SO)	Owuya	Cloetta Center	5,425	3–5–2	11
11	16 October	Frölunda	3–2	Owuya	Hovet	7,767	4–5–2	14
12	19 October	Brynäs	4–3	Owuya	Hovet	6,643	5–5–2	17
13	21 October	HV71	2–0	Owuya	Kinnarps Arena	6,796	5–6–2	17
14	26 October	Frölunda	3–0	Owuya	Scandinavium	10,003	5–7–2	17
15	28 October	Linköping	1–0 (SO)	Owuya	Hovet	6,248	5–7–3	19
16	30 October	Timrå	3–6	Owuya	E.ON Arena	5,118	6–7–3	22

November: 3–3–3 (Home: 2–2–2; Road: 1–1–1)
Round	Date	Opponent	Score	Goaltender	Venue	Attendance	Record	Pts	Recap
17	2 November	Södertälje	4–3	Owuya	Hovet	7,180	7–7–3	25
18	4 November	AIK	2–5	Owuya	Ericsson Globe	13,850	7–8–3	25
19	6 November	Skellefteå	5–4	Sandberg	Skellefteå Kraft Arena	5,703	8–8–3	28
20	18 November	Färjestad	1–3	Ridderwall	Hovet	7,444	8–9–3	28
21	20 November	Modo	3–1	Ridderwall	Hovet	7,922	9–9–3	31
22	23 November	Luleå	1–3	Ridderwall	Coop Norrbotten Arena	4,917	9–10–3	31
23	25 November	Frölunda	4–5 (SO)	Ridderwall	Hovet	6,267	9–10–4	32
24	27 November	Brynäs	3–4 (OT)	Ridderwall	Läkerol Arena	8,045	9–10–5	33
25	30 November	HV71	2–3 (OT)	Ridderwall	Hovet	6,003	9–10–6	34

December: 5–1–2 (Home: 2–1–1; Road: 3–0–1)
Round	Date	Opponent	Score	Goaltender	Venue	Attendance	Record	Pts	Recap
27	4 December	Timrå	2–3 (OT)	Ridderwall	Hovet	7,177	9–10–7	35
28	7 December	Luleå	4–1	Ridderwall	Hovet	7,212	10–10–7	38
29	9 December	Linköping	2–3 (OT)	Owuya	Cloetta Center	6,059	10–10–8	39
30	11 December	Modo	3–2	Ridderwall	Fjällräven Center	6,387	11–10–8	42
26	22 December	AIK	3–1	Ridderwall	Ericsson Globe	11,461	12–10–8	45
31	26 December	Skellefteå	5–1	Owuya	Hovet	7,346	13–10–8	48
32	28 December	Södertälje	2–1	Owuya	AXA Sports Center	4,945	14–10–8	51
33	30 December	Färjestad	2–4	Owuya	Hovet	7,668	14–11–8	51

January: 2–4–5 (Home: 2–1–2; Road: 0–3–3)
Round	Date	Opponent	Score	Goaltender	Venue	Attendance	Record	Pts	Recap
34	2 January	HV71	2–6	Ridderwall	Kinnarps Arena	6,922	14–12–8	51
36	6 January	Timrå	2–3 (OT)	Ridderwall	Hovet	8,094	14–12–9	52
37	8 January	Luleå	1–2 (OT)	Owuya	Coop Norrbotten Arena	4,846	14–12–10	53
35	11 January	AIK	4–1	Owuya	Ericsson Globe	11,893	15–12–10	56
38	13 January	Linköping	1–0	Owuya	Hovet	5,829	16–12–10	59
39	15 January	Modo	4–3 (SO)	Owuya	Hovet	7,703	16–12–11	61
40	20 January	Färjestad	4–3 (SO)	Ridderwall	Löfbergs Lila Arena	5,933	16–12–12	63
41	22 January	Brynäs	1–2	Ridderwall	Hovet	7,585	16–13–12	63
42	24 January	Frölunda	2–4	Ridderwall	Scandinavium	8,616	16–14–12	63
43	27 January	Södertälje	1–2	Ridderwall	Hovet	6,002	16–15–12	63
44	29 January	Skellefteå	4–5 (SO)	Owuya	Skellefteå Kraft Arena	5,395	16–15–13	64

February: 4–3–1 (Home: 3–1–0; Road: 1–2–1)
Round	Date	Opponent	Score	Goaltender	Venue	Attendance	Record	Pts	Recap
46	3 February	Färjestad	5–1	Owuya	Hovet	6,557	17–15–13	67
47	5 February	Brynäs	1–2	Owuya	Läkerol Arena	8,286	17–16–13	67
45	15 February	AIK	2–1 (SO)	Owuya	Ericsson Globe	11,316	17–16–14	69
48	17 February	HV71	5–3	Owuya	Hovet	6,499	18–16–14	72
49	19 February	Modo	2–1	Owuya	Fjällräven Center	7,006	19–16–14	75
50	21 February	Frölunda	5–1	Owuya	Hovet	7,206	20–16–14	78
51	24 February	Södertälje	0–2	Owuya	AXA Sports Center	4,557	20–17–14	78
52	26 February	Luleå	2–4	Owuya	Hovet	8,094	20–18–14	78

March: 2–1–0 (Home: 1–0–0; Road: 1–1–0)
Round	Date	Opponent	Score	Goaltender	Venue	Attendance	Record	Pts	Recap
53	1 March	Linköping	4–2	Ridderwall	Cloetta Center	6,412	21–18–14	81
54	3 March	Skellefteå	3–1	Owuya	Hovet	7,490	22–18–14	84
55	5 March	Timrå	1–2	Owuya	E.ON Arena	5,158	22–19–14	84

Legend: Win (3 points) Overtime/Shootout win (2 point) Loss (0 points) Overtime/Shootout loss (1 point)

== Playoffs ==
=== Game log ===
2011 Playoffs game log

Quarterfinals vs. Luleå: 3–4 Loss (Home: 2–1; Road: 1–2)
Date	Opponent	Score	Goaltender	Goalscorers	Venue	Attendance	Series	Recap
8 March	Luleå	1–2 OT	Owuya	Hannula (1)	Coop Norrbotten Arena	4,841	0–1
10 March	Luleå	1–2	Owuya	Hannula (2)	Hovet	8,094 (100%)	0–2
12 March	Luleå	1–3	Owuya	Cehlin (1)	Coop Norrbotten Arena	6,097	0–3
14 March	Luleå	4–2	Owuya	Ottosson (1,2), Widing (1), Tjärnqvist (1)	Hovet	8,094 (100%)	1–3
16 March	Luleå	2–0	Owuya	Eriksson (1), Brodin (1)	Coop Norrbotten Arena	5,398	2–3
18 March	Luleå	2–0	Owuya	Tjärnqvist (2), Ottosson (3)	Ericsson Globe	13,850 (100%)	3–3
20 March	Luleå	3–4 OT	Owuya	Brodin (2), Hannula (3), Zibanejad (1)	Coop Norrbotten Arena	6,300	3–4

Legend: Win Loss

== Statistics ==
from stats.swehockey

=== Skaters ===
Nr	Name	Pos	Nationality	GP	G	A	P	PIM	GP	G	A	P	PIM
Nr	Name	Pos	Nationality	Regular season					Playoffs				
#32	Marcus Krüger	C	SWE	52	6	29	35	52	3	0	1	1	0
#78	Josef Boumedienne	D	SWE	52	5	25	30	73	7	0	3	3	6
#7	Andreas Holmqvist	D	SWE	49	12	17	29	10	7	0	3	3	2
#17	Mathias Tjärnqvist	F	SWE	43	17	6	23	18	7	2	2	4	2
#4	Marcus Nilson	F	SWE	39	7	16	23	38	7	0	3	3	2
#9	Kristofer Ottosson	C	SWE	53	6	17	23	16	7	3	0	3	0
#41	Daniel Widing	F	SWE	52	10	11	21	55	7	1	0	1	2
#41	Staffan Kronwall	D	SWE	45	7	13	20	14	7	0	1	1	2
#70	Mario Kempe	F	SWE	54	10	7	17	6	7	0	0	0	0
#37	John Norman	C	SWE	51	8	9	17	10	7	0	1	1	6
#29	Patrick Cehlin	F	SWE	48	4	12	16	14	7	1	0	1	2
#26	Tim Eriksson	F	SWE	52	5	10	15	16	7	1	0	1	0
#15	Oscar Eklund	D	SWE	52	5	10	15	28	7	0	3	3	4
#20	Christian Eklund	C	SWE	53	4	10	14	44	7	0	0	0	6
#34	Daniel Brodin	F	SWE	51	4	9	13	61	7	2	0	2	6
#19	Jimmie Ölvestad	F	SWE	34	7	5	12	20	3	0	0	0	2
#33	Mika Zibanejad	C	SWE	26	5	4	9	2	7	1	1	2	2
#3	Nils Ekman	F	SWE	20	4	5	9	33	0	0	0	0	0
#51	Mika Hannula	F	SWE	14	5	3	8	14	5	3	0	3	0
#55	David Printz	D	SWE	50	1	7	8	79	7	0	0	0	2
#16	Nichlas Falk	D	SWE	45	3	3	6	12	7	0	0	0	2
#21	Stefan Lassen	D	DEN	43	2	1	3	22	2	0	0	0	0
#14	Fredrik Claesson	D	SWE	35	2	0	2	6	7	0	1	1	0
#36	Marcus Sörensen	F	SWE	8	1	1	2	0	0	0	0	0	0
#8	Alexander Deilert	D	SWE	27	0	1	1	4	0	0	0	0	0
#18	Fredric Weigel	F	SWE	1	0	0	0	0	0	0	0	0	0
#36	Philip Holm	D	SWE	1	0	0	0	0	0	0	0	0	0
#18	Pontus Åberg	F	SWE	1	0	0	0	0	0	0	0	0	0
#10	Marcus Ragnarsson	D	SWE	3	0	0	0	4	0	0	0	0	0
#28	Kim Lennhammer	D	SWE	5	0	0	0	0	0	0	0	0	0
#6	Arvid Strömberg	F	SWE	6	0	0	0	0	0	0	0	0	0
#44	Stefan Söder	F	SWE	11	0	0	0	0	0	0	0	0	0
#18	Simon Mitman	F	SWE	17	0	0	0	0	0	0	0	0	0

=== Goaltenders ===
Nr	Name	Pos	Nationality	GP	SVS%	GAA	SO	GP	SVS%	GAA	SO
Nr	Name	Pos	Nationality	Regular season				Playoffs			
30	Mark Owuya	G	SWE	32	92,68	2,18	2	7	93,37	1,66	2
1	Tim Sandberg	G	SWE	2	91,30	2,40	0	0	0	0	0
39	Stefan Ridderwall	G	SWE	24	90,06	2,80	0	0	0	0	0

== Roster ==
Updated 12 January 2011.

No.	Nat	Player	Pos	S/G	Age	Acquired	Birthplace
78	(Sweden)	Josef Boumedienne	D	L	48	2010	Stockholm, Sweden
34	(Sweden)	Daniel Brodin	RW	R	36	2009	Stockholm, Sweden
29	(Sweden)	Patrick Cehlin	RW	R	34	2009	Stockholm, Sweden
8	(Sweden)	Alexander Deilert	D	R	37	2008	Stockholm, Sweden
20	(Sweden)	Christian Eklund	C	L	48	2006	Haninge, Sweden
15	(Sweden)	Oscar Eklund	D	L	37	2006	Stockholm, Sweden
3	(Sweden)	Nils Ekman	LW	L	50	2010	Stockholm, Sweden
26	(Sweden)	Tim Eriksson	LW	L	44	2008	Södertälje, Sweden
16	(Sweden)	Nichlas Falk	D/C	L	55	1995	Stockholm, Sweden
51	(Sweden)	Mika Hannula	RW	R	47	2010	Huddinge, Sweden
7	(Sweden)	Andreas Holmqvist	D	R	44	2008	Stockholm, Sweden
70	(Sweden)	Mario Kempe	RW	L	37	2010	Kramfors, Sweden
24	(Sweden)	Staffan Kronwall	D	L	43	2010	Järfälla, Sweden
32	(Sweden)	Marcus Krüger	C	L	35	2008	Stockholm, Sweden
21	(Denmark)	Stefan Lassen	D	L	40	2010	Herning, Denmark
28	(Sweden)	Kim Lennhammer	D	R	35	2010	Stockholm, Sweden
4	(Sweden)	Marcus Nilson	LW	R	48	2009	Bålsta, Sweden
37	(Sweden)	John Norman	C	L	35	2010	Stockholm, Sweden
19	(Sweden)	Jimmie Ölvestad	RW	L	46	2004	Stockholm, Sweden
9	(Sweden)	Kristofer Ottosson	C	L	50	1998	Skarpnäck, Sweden
30	(Sweden)	Mark Owuya	G	L	36	2007	Stockholm, Sweden
55	(Sweden)	David Printz	D	L	45	2007	Solna, Sweden
39	(Sweden)	Stefan Ridderwall	G	L	38	2004	Brännkyrka, Sweden
1	(Sweden)	Tim Sandberg	G	L	35	2010	Stockholm, Sweden
36	(Sweden)	Marcus Sörensen	RW	R	34	2010	Södertälje, Sweden
17	(Sweden)	Mathias Tjärnqvist	LW	L	47	2009	Umeå, Sweden
41	(Sweden)	Daniel Widing	RW	L	44	2010	Gävle, Sweden
33	(Sweden)	Mika Zibanejad	C	R	33	2010	Huddinge, Sweden

== Transfers ==
Acquired by Djurgårdens IF
Player	Former team	Notes
G (Sweden) Tim Sandberg	(Sweden) Djurgården J-20	
D (Sweden) Kim Lennhammer	(Sweden) Djurgården J-20	
D (Sweden) Josef Boumedienne	(Switzerland) EV Zug	
D (Denmark) Stefan Lassen	(Sweden) Leksands IF	
F (Sweden) Stefan Söder	(Sweden) Djurgården J-20	
F (Sweden) John Norman	(Sweden) Djurgården J-20	
F (Sweden) Arvid Strömberg	(Sweden) Djurgården J-20	
F (Sweden) Nils Ekman	(Russia) SKA St. Petersburg	
F (Sweden) Mario Kempe	(Sweden) Rögle BK	
F (Sweden) Daniel Widing	(Switzerland) HC Davos	
D (Sweden) Staffan Kronwall	(Canada) Abbotsford Heat	
F (Sweden) Mika Hannula	(Russia) Metallurg Magnitogorsk	

Leaving Djurgårdens IF
Player	New team	Notes
G (Sweden) Gustaf Wesslau	(United States) Columbus Blue Jackets	
D (United States) Kyle Klubertanz	(Canada) Montreal Canadiens	
D (Sweden) Timmy Pettersson	(Russia) Severstal Cherepovets	
F (Sweden) Jacob Josefson	(United States) New Jersey Devils	
F (Sweden) Michael Holmqvist	(Sweden) Linköpings HC	
F (Sweden) Andreas Engqvist	(Canada) Montreal Canadiens	
F (Sweden) Henrik Eriksson	(Sweden) Mora IK	
F (Sweden) Nicklas Danielsson	(Sweden) Modo Hockey	
F (Sweden) Carl Gustafsson	(Sweden) Rögle BK	
F (Canada) Mike Zigomanis	(Canada) Toronto Maple Leafs	

== Drafted players ==
Djurgårdens IF players picked in the 2011 NHL entry draft at the Xcel Energy Center in St. Paul, Minnesota.

Round	Pick	Player	Nationality	NHL team
1st	6th	Mika Zibanejad	Sweden	Ottawa Senators
4th	120th	Ludwig Blomstrand	Sweden	Vancouver Canucks
5th	126th	Fredrik Claesson	Sweden	Ottawa Senators
