= 2011–12 Djurgårdens IF (men's hockey) season =

Professional ice hockey team season of play

2011–12 Djurgårdens IF Hockey
- League: Regular: 11th Kvalserien: 3rd (rel.) SHL
- 2011–12 record: 15–23–17
- Home record: 12–9–6
- Road record: 3–14–11
- Goals for: 123
- Goals against: 144

Team information
- General manager: Janne Järlefelt
- Coach: Charles Berglund
- Assistant coach: Tony Zabel; Tomas Montén; Nichlas Falk
- Captain: Marcus Nilson
- Alternate captains: Daniel Tjärnqvist; Kristofer Ottosson
- Arena: Hovet, Ericsson Globe
- Average attendance: Regular: 7,723; Kvalserien: 6,234

Team leaders
- Goals: Jimmie Ölvestad (13)
- Assists: Marcus Nilson (21)
- Points: Marcus Nilson (32)
- Penalty minutes: Jimmie Ölvestad (83)
- Wins: Gustaf Wesslau (25)
- Goals against average: Gustaf Wesslau (2.35)

The 2011–12 Djurgårdens IF Hockey season is Djurgården's 36th season in the Swedish elite league, Elitserien. The regular season began on away ice on September 15, 2011 against HV71 and concluded on March 6, 2012 also on away ice against HV71.

Djurgården finished 11th in the regular season and were therefore forced to play in the 2012 Kvalserien to survive in the highest division, marking the club's first Kvalserien appearance in 30 years. The Kvalserien was played between 15 March and 6 April 2012. Djurgården failed to stay in the highest division and went on to play in the second-tier league HockeyAllsvenskan for the 2012–13 season.

== Pre-season ==
=== European Trophy ===
Djurgården's 2011–12 pre-season included the international tournament European Trophy. Djurgården were placed in the north division along with Slavia Praha, Sparta Praha, Jokerit, HIFK and Luleå HF. Additional games were also played against Red Bull Salzburg, KalPa and Linköpings HC. Djurgården started off successfully with four straight wins, before losing the fifth game in overtime away against HIFK (although Djurgården came back from a 0–3 deficit to tie the game). However, the club lost the three remaining games. The game against Luleå ended with a bench-clearing brawl, which led to three Djurgården players and two Luleå players receiving a game misconduct penalty. After losing the last game against Linköping, Djurgården had to rely on Luleå losing their last game to qualify for the playoffs. Luleå won their game, and Djurgården were subsequently eliminated.

==== Standings ====
Team	GP	W	OTW	OTL	L	GF	GA	DIF	PTS
(Finland) Jokerit	8	6	0	0	2	29	18	+11	18
(Sweden) Luleå HF	8	4	1	0	3	23	21	+2	14
(Sweden) Djurgårdens IF	8	4	0	1	3	25	20	+5	13
(Finland) HIFK	8	3	2	0	3	24	19	+5	13
(Czech Republic) Sparta Praha	8	3	0	1	4	20	23	–3	10
(Czech Republic) Slavia Praha	8	2	0	1	5	18	29	–11	7

==== Game log ====
2011 European Trophy game log

Group stage: 4–2–1 (Home: 3–1–0; Road: 1–1–1)
Round	Date	Opponent	Score	Goaltender	Venue	Attendance	Record	Pts	Recap
1	August 11	(Czech Republic) Slavia Praha	5 – 2	Wesslau	Hovet	1,743	1–0–0	3
2	August 13	(Czech Republic) Sparta Praha	4 – 2	Wesslau	Hovet	1,248	2–0–0	6
3	August 14	(Austria) Red Bull Salzburg	4 – 2	Sandberg	Hovet	1,818	3–0–0	9
4	August 20	(Finland) Jokerit	4 – 1	Wesslau	(Finland) Valtti Areena	1,524	4–0–0	12
5	August 21	(Finland) HIFK	3 – 4 OT	Sandberg	(Finland) Valtti Areena	1,800	4–0–1	13
6	August 23	(Finland) KalPa	1 – 3	Wesslau	(Finland) Kuopion Jäähalli	3,283	4–1–1	13
7	September 1	Luleå	2 – 3	Wesslau	Hovet	2,944	4–2–1	13
8	September 3	Linköping	2 – 3	Wesslau	VMP Group Arena	837	4–3–1	13

Legend: Win (3 points) Overtime/Shootout win (2 points) Loss (0 points) Overtime/Shootout loss (1 point)

==== Stats ====
Players

No	Pos	Player	GP	G	A	Pts	PIM
#1	F	(Sweden) Marcus Nilson	5	2	4	6	6
#2	F	(Sweden) Patrick Cehlin	5	1	4	5	2
#3	F	(Sweden) Mattias Carlsson	5	2	3	5	0
#4	C	(Sweden) Kristofer Ottosson	4	1	3	4	0
#5	F	(Sweden) Mathias Tjärnqvist	5	3	1	4	6

Goalkeepers

No	Player	GPI	MIP	SOG	GA	GAA	SVS%	SO
#1	(Sweden) Gustaf Wesslau	3	180:00	102	5	1.67	95.10%	0
#2	(Sweden) Tim Sandberg	2	123:28	75	6	2.92	92.00%	0

== Regular season ==
=== Summary ===
Djurgården set off to meet HV71 away in the Elitserien premier on 15 September. The game was however overshadowed by the 2011 Lokomotiv Yaroslavl plane crash where Swedish former HV71 goaltender Stefan Liv and the entire Lokomotiv Yaroslavl team were killed. A one-minute silence was held before the game. The game ended in a 2–1 Djurgården victory after Pontus Åberg scored the game-winning goal, which was also his first Elitserien goal.

Two days later the club returned to Stockholm for their first home game of the season against Modo. The Hovet arena was sold out, but Modo gained the upper hand and ultimately won 4–1. The first Stockholm derby against AIK was played on 20 September. The first period began with AIK scoring the opening goal after seven minutes, and Djurgården decided to take a timeout. The first period ended 1–0 in AIK's favour, but Djurgården quickly turned the game around with three goals in three minutes in the beginning of the second period. In the end, Djurgården won 4–2 in front of an outsold Ericsson Globe.

Winger Jimmie Ölvestad received a game misconduct penalty in the third round game against Luleå HF, after dealing a check to the head on Luleå's Mattias Persson, which caused him to suffer a concussion. Ölvestad was subsequently suspended for three games and had to pay a 15,000 SEK fine. Luleå came out on top with a 5–2 win.

1997 IIHF Hall of Fame inductee and eight-time Swedish Champion with Djurgården Sven Tumba died at the age of 80 on 1 October. Djurgården had previously retired number five in his honour. Djurgården was scheduled to play against Elitserien newcomer Växjö Lakers the same day and, as a result of his death, a ceremony was held, including a one-minute silence before the game. The 2–1 victory against Växjö was Djurgården's first at the regular home arena Hovet this season.

After winning the 13 October home game 4–1 against Linköpings HC, as well as having 17 points after the first eleven games, Djurgården began a negative period of losses. Although only getting three regulation-time losses—all of them at the home arena Hovet—Djurgården's two wins came in shootouts. After only getting six points between 15 October–3 November, Djurgården took a long-waited regulation-time win on 5 November by beating Timrå IK 3–0 at home. Despite the negative period spanning over three weeks, 26 points in the first nineteen games was just two points less than Djurgården's previous season start. Centre Mika Zibanejad returned to Djurgården after playing nine games in the NHL with the Ottawa Senators. He made his comeback in the shootout loss against Frölunda HC on 1 November.

Following a one-week break, Djurgården resumed the season with the second derby game of the season against AIK on 14 November. Djurgården were dressed as the away team. In the game, Djurgården were shutout 0–5 and recorded their biggest derby loss since 28 December 2000 (5–0 to AIK), as well as their first derby loss since 4 November 2010 (5–2 to AIK). Before the derby loss against AIK on 14 November, Djurgården had won the five most recent derby games against AIK. However, Djurgården quickly bounced back two days later with a 5–1 win at Hovet against Färjestad. Jan Ednertz, the CEO of Djurgården Hockey AB, announced that he would leave the Djurgården organization after the 2011–12 season on 21 November. Djurgården Hockey AB is the organization which handles the elite team within Djurgårdens IF Hockey.

On 23 December 2011, Djurgården knocked AIK back by winning the third Stockholm derby of the season 3–2 in front of an outsold Ericsson Globe carrying 13,850 spectators. As a result, Djurgården climbed back to a playoff spot, placing seventh in the league with 43 points.

On 12 January 2012, in a 2–3 overtime loss against Frölunda, Marcus Nilson punched a linesman in the arm while trying to reach Jari Tolsa after a goal by Frölunda. As a result, Nilson was suspended for 2 games.

On 24 January 2012, former five-time Djurgården Swedish champion Charles Berglund's No. 2 jersey was retired and raised to the rafters in Hovet prior to a game against Färjestad. Djurgården took a 2–1 win in a shootout.

After only getting 10 points in January and falling down below a playoff spot, Djurgården decided to change the coaching staff. Head coach Hardy Nilsson and assistant coach Mikael Johansson were fired, and were replaced by the then J-20 coaching staff consisting of Tony Zabel as head coach and Nichlas Falk as assistant coach. Hans Särkijärvi took over as head coach of the J-20 team.

These changes did not improve the situation, as Djurgården were now seated in one of the two spots for the relegation series Kvalserien. Following four victories in five games, Djurgården had everything in their hands to avoid a Kvalserien spot going into the final round of the regular season on 6 March. Djurgården needed a win against HV71 to secure play in Elitserien for the 2012–13 season, but after losing 1–2, Djurgården had to rely on a regulation loss for Linköping. Linköping, however, played a 4–4 tie against Modo and surpassed Djurgården and put them in the 2012 Kvalserien. As a result, Djurgården once again modified the staff as Charles Berglund went in as head coach while Tony Zabel now went down and became assistant coach.

=== Standings ===
2011–12 Elitserien season	GP	W	L	OTW	OTL	GF	GA	GD	Pts
Luleå HF^{y}	55	25	13	8	9	128	104	+24	100
Skellefteå AIK^{x}	55	26	17	5	7	148	125	+23	95
HV71^{x}	55	22	16	9	8	151	130	+21	92
Brynäs IF^{x}	55	25	19	6	5	148	140	+8	92
Frölunda HC^{x}	55	22	17	8	8	140	113	+27	90
Färjestad BK^{x}	55	23	18	4	10	124	124	0	87
AIK^{x}	55	19	19	8	9	146	132	+14	82
Modo Hockey^{x}	55	19	22	8	6	146	147	–1	79
Växjö Lakers HC^{e}	55	18	22	8	7	124	133	–9	77
Linköpings HC^{e}	55	17	24	7	7	120	138	–18	72
Djurgårdens IF^{r}	55	15	23	10	7	123	144	–21	72
Timrå IK^{r}	55	10	31	8	6	115	183	–68	52

x – clinched playoff spot; y – clinched regular season league title; e – eliminated from playoff contention; r – play in relegation series

=== Game log ===
2011–12 Elitserien game log: 15–22–17 (Home: 12–9–6; Road: 3–13–11)

September: 3–3–1 (Home: 1–2–0; Road: 2–1–1)
Round	Date	Opponent	Score	Goaltender	Venue	Attendance	Record	Pts	Recap
1	September 15	HV71	2 – 1	Wesslau	Kinnarps Arena	7,000	1–0–0	3
2	September 15	Modo	1 – 4	Wesslau	Hovet	8,094	1–1–0	3
9	September 20	AIK	4 – 2	Wesslau	Ericsson Globe	13,850	2–1–0	6
3	September 22	Luleå	2 – 5	Sanderg	Coop Norrbotten Arena	4,648	2–2–0	6
4	September 24	Timrå	5 – 4	Wesslau	E.ON Arena	4,414	3–2–0	9
5	September 27	Brynäs	2 – 4	Wesslau	Hovet	7,633	3–3–0	9
6	September 29	Färjestad	3 – 2 SO	Wesslau	Löfbergs Lila Arena	5,163	3–3–1	11

October: 2–5–2 (Home: 2–3–0; Road: 0–2–2)
Round	Date	Opponent	Score	Goaltender	Venue	Attendance	Record	Pts	Recap
7	October 1	Växjö	2 – 1	Wesslau	Hovet	6,090	4–3–1	14
8	October 4	Skellefteå	2 – 4	Wesslau	Skellefteå Kraft Arena	4,273	4–4–1	14
10	October 8	Frölunda	0 – 2	Wesslau	Scandinavium	10,507	4–5–1	14
11	October 13	Linköping	4 – 1	Wesslau	Hovet	6,090	5–5–1	17
12	October 15	Skellefteå	1 – 3	Wesslau	Hovet	7,001	5–6–1	17
13	October 19	Linköping	3 – 2 SO	Wesslau	Cloetta Center	6,736	5–6–2	19
14	October 22	Luleå	1 – 3	Wesslau	Hovet	6,936	5–7–2	19
16	October 27	HV71	2 – 3	Wesslau	Hovet	6,390	5–8–2	19
17	October 29	Modo	2 – 1 OT	Wesslau	Fjällräven Center	6,373	5–8–3	21

November: 3–2–4 (Home: 3–1–1; Road: 0–1–3)
Round	Date	Opponent	Score	Goaltender	Venue	Attendance	Record	Pts	Recap
18	November 1	Frölunda	2 – 3 SO	Wesslau	Hovet	7,546	5–8–4	22
19	November 3	Brynäs	2 – 3 SO	Wesslau	Läkerol Arena	7,453	5–8–5	23
20	November 5	Timrå	3 – 0	Wesslau	Hovet	6,940	6–8–5	26
15	November 14	AIK	0 – 5	Wesslau	Ericsson Globe	11,428	6–9–5	26
21	November 16	Färjestad	5 – 1	Wesslau	Hovet	7,125	7–9–5	29
22	November 18	Växjö	4 – 3 SO	Wesslau	Vida Arena	5,247	7–9–6	31
23	November 22	Frölunda	3 – 4 SO	Wesslau	Scandinavium	10,027	7–9–7	32
24	November 27	Växjö	4 – 2	Wesslau	Hovet	6,901	8–9–7	35
25	November 29	Modo	3 – 5	Sandberg	Hovet	7,346	8–10–7	35

December: 3–2–3 (Home: 2–1–1; Road: 1–1–2)
Round	Date	Opponent	Score	Goaltender	Venue	Attendance	Record	Pts	Recap
26	December 1	HV71	2 – 3 SO	Wesslau	Kinnarps Arena	6,623	8–10–8	36
27	December 3	Luleå	5 – 4 OT	Wesslau	Coop Norrbotten Arena	6,020	8–10–9	38
29	December 7	Brynäs	5 – 2	Wesslau	Hovet	7,556	9–10–9	41
30	December 10	Skellefteå	1 – 8	Wesslau/Sandberg	Skellefteå Kraft Arena	4,788	9–11–9	41
28	December 22	AIK	3 – 2 SO	Wesslau	Ericsson Globe	13,850	9–11–10	43
32	December 26	Linköping	3 – 1	Wesslau	Hovet	7,304	10–11–10	46
33	December 28	Timrå	7 – 3	Wesslau	E.ON Arena	4,719	11–11–10	49
34	December 30	Luleå	0 – 3	Wesslau	Hovet	7,763	11–12–10	49

January: 2–5–3 (Home: 2–0–2; Road: 0–5–1)
Round	Date	Opponent	Score	Goaltender	Venue	Attendance	Record	Pts	Recap
35	January 5	Växjö	0 – 3	Wesslau	Vida Arena	5,225	11–13–10	49
36	January 7	Skellefteå	3 – 2	Wesslau	Hovet	8,094	12–13–10	52
38	January 10	Brynäs	1 – 3	Wesslau	Läkerol Arena	5,767	12–14–10	52
37	January 12	Frölunda	2 – 3 OT	Wesslau	Hovet	6,024	12–14–11	53
40	January 17	Timrå	3 – 0	Wesslau	Hovet	5,815	13–14–11	56
39	January 19	Linköping	0 – 5	Wesslau	Cloetta Center	7,033	13–15–11	56
41	January 24	Färjestad	2 – 1 SO	Wesslau	Hovet	7,170	13–15–12	58
42	January 26	AIK	3 – 4 OT	Wesslau	Ericsson Globe	12,079	13–15–13	59
31	January 29	Färjestad	0 – 1	Wesslau	Löfbergs Lila Arena	6,468	13–16–13	59
43	January 31	Modo	0 – 1	Wesslau	Fjällräven Center	5,811	13–17–13	59

February: 2–5–2 (Home: 2–2–1; Road: 0–3–1)
Round	Date	Opponent	Score	Goaltender	Venue	Attendance	Record	Pts	Recap
44	February 2	HV71	1 – 4	Wesslau	Hovet	6,429	13–18–13	59
45	February 4	Brynäs	6 – 3	Wesslau	Hovet	8,094	14–18–13	62
46	February 14	Frölunda	1 – 2	Wesslau	Scandinavium	10,062	14–19–13	62
47	February 16	AIK	1 – 4	Wesslau	Ericsson Globe	10,061	14–20–13	62
48	February 18	Luleå	1 – 2	Wesslau	Coop Norrbotten Arena	4,923	14–21–13	62
49	February 21	Färjestad	0 – 3	Wesslau	Löfbergs Lila Arena	6,317	14–22–13	62
50	February 23	Växjö	2 – 1	Wesslau	Hovet	6,245	15–22–13	65
51	February 25	Skellefteå	3 – 2 SO	Wesslau	Skellefteå Kraft Arena	5,601	15–22–14	67
52	February 28	Linköping	2 – 1 SO	Wesslau	Hovet	8,094	15–22–14	69

March: 0–1–2 (Home: 0–0–1; Road: 0–1–1)
Round	Date	Opponent	Score	Goaltender	Venue	Attendance	Record	Pts	Recap
53	March 1	Timrå	1 – 2 SO	Wesslau	E.ON Arena	4,403	15–22–15	70
54	March 3	Modo	2 – 1 SO	Wesslau	Hovet	8,094	15–22–16	72
55	March 6	HV71	1 – 2	Wesslau	Kinnarps Arena	6,799	15–23–16	72

Legend: Win (3 points) Overtime/Shootout win (2 points) Loss (0 points) Overtime/Shootout loss (1 point)

== Kvalserien ==
=== Summary ===
Djurgården started the Kvalserien good with victories in two of the first three games. But, Djurgården would then round up three consecutive losses, two of which came against Elitserien rivals Timrå IK. After only collecting six points in the first six games, Djurgården used their last hopes and won 4–2 against Örebro HK. Going to the eighth game, Djurgården were most likely forced to defeat Leksands IF in order to keep their Elitserien dreams alive. Djurgården lost 0–2 and, because Rögle BK defeated BIK Karlskoga, ended a 35-year run of consecutive seasons in the top division. As a result, Djurgården would spend the 2012–13 season in the second-tier division HockeyAllsvenskan.

=== Standings ===
2012 Kvalserien		GP	W	T	L	OTW/SOW	OTL/SOL	GF	GA	DIF	PTS
1	Timrå IK	10	5	4	1	3	1	29	20	+9	22
2	Rögle BK	10	6	1	3	0	1	31	23	+8	19
3	Djurgårdens IF	10	4	2	4	1	1	24	21	+3	15
4	Leksands IF	10	3	2	5	1	1	20	26	–6	12
5	Örebro HK	10	3	1	6	1	0	22	27	–5	11
6	BIK Karlskoga	10	2	4	4	1	3	18	27	–9	11

Legend: Qualified for the 2012–13 Elitserien season; Play in the 2012–13 HockeyAllsvenskan season

=== Game log ===
2012 Kvalserien game log: 4–4–2 (Home: 3–2–0; Road: 1–2–2)

Round	Date	Opponent	Score	Goaltender	Venue	Attendance	Record	Pts	Recap
1	March 15	Rögle BK	3 – 4	Wesslau	Hovet	6,244	0–1–0	0
2	March 17	BIK Karlskoga	3 – 2 SO	Wesslau	Nobelhallen	5,457	0–1–1	2
3	March 19	Leksands IF	3 – 1	Wesslau	Hovet	8,094	1–1–1	5
4	March 22	Örebro HK	2 – 3 SO	Wesslau	Behrn Arena	4,553	1–1–2	6
5	March 24	Timrå IK	2 – 3	Wesslau	Hovet	7,651	1–2–2	6
6	March 27	Timrå IK	2 – 3	Wesslau	E.ON Arena	5,826	1–3–2	6
7	March 29	Örebro HK	4 – 2	Wesslau	Hovet	6,032	2–3–2	9
8	March 31	Leksands IF	0 – 2	Wesslau	Tegera Arena	7,650	2–4–2	9
9	April 3	BIK Karlskoga	3 – 0	Wesslau	Hovet	3,150	3–4–2	12
10	April 6	Rögle BK	2 – 1	Wesslau	Lindab Arena	5,048	4–4–2	15

Legend: Win (3 points) Overtime/Shootout win (2 points) Loss (0 points) Overtime/Shootout loss (1 point)

=== Statistics ===
Players

No	Pos	Player	GP	G	A	Pts	PIM
#			x	x	x	x	x

Goaltenders

No	Player	GPI	MIP	SOG	GA	GAA	SVS%	SO
#		x	00:00	x	x	0.00	00.00%	x

== Transfers ==
Acquired by Djurgårdens IF
Player	Former team	Date	Notes
D (Sweden) Philip Holm	(Sweden) Djurgården J-20	18 February	
F (Sweden) Jonas Almtorp	(Sweden) Södertälje SK	11 April	
F (Sweden) Mattias Carlsson	(Sweden) Södertälje SK	26 April	
G (Sweden) Gustaf Wesslau	(United States) Columbus Blue Jackets	2 May	
D (Sweden) Erik Gustafsson	(Sweden) Djurgården J-20	24 May	
F (Sweden) Fredric Weigel	(Sweden) Djurgården J-20	24 May	
F (Sweden) Pontus Åberg	(Sweden) Djurgården J-20	24 May	
D (United States) Kyle Klubertanz	(Canada) Montreal Canadiens	1 June	
D (Sweden) Daniel Tjärnqvist	(Russia) Lokomotiv Yaroslavl	27 June	
(Sweden) Tony Zabel (head coach)	(Sweden) Djurgården J-20	30 January	
(Sweden) Nichlas Falk (ass. coach)	(Sweden) Djurgården J-20	30 January	

Leaving Djurgårdens IF
Player	New team	Date	Notes
F (Sweden) Marcus Krüger	(United States) Chicago Blackhawks	22 March	
D (Sweden) Oscar Eklund	(Finland) Oulun Kärpät	28 March	
G (Sweden) Stefan Ridderwall	(Sweden) Timrå IK	11 April	
D (Sweden) Nichlas Falk	Retires	19 April	
D (Sweden) Staffan Kronwall	(Russia) Severstal Cherepovets	20 April	
G (Sweden) Mark Owuya	(Canada) Toronto Maple Leafs	28 April	
D (Sweden) Alexander Deilert	(Sweden) Leksands IF	6 May	
F (Sweden) Daniel Widing	(Sweden) Brynäs IF	16 May	
F (Sweden) Arvid Strömberg	(Sweden) Kallinge/Ronneby IF	23 May	
F (Sweden) Nils Ekman	Retires	10 August	
F (Sweden) Mika Hannula	(Sweden) Modo Hockey	30 August	
D (Denmark) Stefan Lassen	(Sweden) Malmö Redhawks	31 August	
D (Sweden) Josef Boumedienne	(Finland) Jokerit	28 January	
(Sweden) Hardy Nilsson (head coach)	Retires	30 January	
(Sweden) Mikael Johansson (ass. coach)	Retires	30 January	
