= 2009–10 Djurgårdens IF (men's hockey) season =

Swedish ice hockey club season

2009–10 Djurgårdens IF Hockey
- League: Regular: 2nd Playoffs: Lost finals SHL
- 2009–10 record: 26–17–12
- Home record: 14–5–8
- Road record: 12–12–4
- Goals for: 161
- Goals against: 130

Team information
- General manager: Janne Järlefelt
- Coach: Hardy Nilsson
- Assistant coach: Mikael Johansson; Tomas Montén
- Captain: Marcus Ragnarsson
- Alternate captains: Marcus Nilson; Andreas Engqvist
- Arena: Hovet, Ericsson Globe
- Average attendance: Regular: 7,034 (2nd); Playoffs: 10,519 (1st)

Team leaders
- Goals: Marcus Nilson (24)
- Assists: Marcus Nilson (27)
- Points: Marcus Nilson (51)
- Penalty minutes: Andreas Holmqvist (84)

The 2009–10 Djurgårdens IF Hockey season was the club's 34th season in the Swedish elite league Elitserien. Hardy Nilsson returned to Djurgården as head coach on March 2, 2009. Nilsson previously coached Djurgården during the 1999–2000 and the 2000–01 seasons. The club became Swedish champions during both of these seasons. Djurgården lost last season's scoring leader when Fredrik Bremberg moved to Atlant Moscow Oblast. The team was later reinforced by former NHL and Djurgården player Marcus Nilson. Marcus Ragnarsson replaced Jimmie Ölvestad as team captain on August 7, 2009. The regular season started on away ice on September 24, 2009, against HV71 and was concluded on March 13, 2010, away against Frölunda HC. Djurgården reached the final in the playoff rounds, where the team lost 4–2 in games against HV71.

== Pre-season ==
Djurgården began the pre-season playing in the 2009 Nordic Trophy tournament, a total of five games plus two playoff games, from August 7 to August 29, 2009. Djurgården became champions defeating Linköpings HC in the final.

=== Nordic Trophy ===
==== Standings ====
Nordic Trophy	GP	W	L	T	OTW	OTL	PSW	PSL	GF	GA	Pts
y-HV71	5	4	1	0	0	0	0	0	20	9	12
y-Frölunda HC	5	3	2	0	0	0	0	0	17	14	9
y-Djurgårdens IF	5	2	2	1	0	1	0	0	13	11	7
y-Linköpings HC	5	1	2	2	1	0	0	1	12	13	6
x-Färjestads BK	5	2	3	0	0	0	0	0	9	14	6
x-Malmö Redhawks	5	1	3	1	0	0	1	0	9	19	5

y - clinched semi-final spot for championship, x - play for 5th place

==== Game log ====
2009 Nordic trophy game log

Group stage: 2–2–1 (Home: 2–0–1; Road: 0–2–0)
Round	Date	Opponent	Score	Goaltender	Venue	Attendance	Record	Pts	Recap
1	August 7	Linköping	1 – 2	Wesslau	Norrtälje Ishall	813	0–0–1	1
2	August 11	Frölunda	0 – 4	Owuya	Frölundaborg	5,283	0–1–1	1
3	August 14	Malmö	7 – 0	Wesslau	Sollentuna Ishall	852	1–1–1	4
4	August 18	Färjestad	3 – 2	Wesslau	Stora Mossen	1,442	2–1–1	7
5	August 20	HV71	2 – 3	Ridderwall	Nässjö Ishall	976	2–2–1	7

Playoffs
Round	Date	Opponent	Score	Goaltender	Venue	Attendance	Recap
Semifinal	August 28	Frölunda	3 – 0	Wesslau	(Finland) Islandia	445
Final	August 29	Linköping	4 – 1	Wesslau	(Finland) Islandia	672

Legend: Win (3 points) Overtime win (2 point) Loss (0 points) Overtime loss (1 point)

==== Final standings ====
Gold medal	Djurgårdens IF
Silver medal	Linköpings HC
Bronze medal	HV71
4	Frölunda HC
5	Malmö Redhawks
6	Färjestads BK

==== Stats ====
Players

No	Pos	Player	GP	G	A	Pts	PIM
#1	F	(Sweden) Jacob Josefson	7	5	4	9	2
#2	F	(Sweden) Nicklas Danielsson	7	2	4	6	14
#3	C	(Sweden) Andreas Engqvist	7	1	5	6	6
#4	C	(Sweden) Kristofer Ottosson	4	1	3	4	4
#5	D	(United States) Kyle Klubertanz	7	2	1	3	8

Goalkeepers

No	Player	GPI	MIP	SOG	GA	GAA	SVS%
#1	(Sweden) Gustaf Wesslau	5	302:22	132	5	0.99	96.21%
#2	(Sweden) Stefan Ridderwall	1	59:30	22	3	3.03	86.36%
#3	(Sweden) Mark Owuya	1	60:00	26	4	4.00	84.62%

==== Honours ====
Honour	Player
Player of tournament	(Sweden) Andreas Engqvist
Most points	(Sweden) Jacob Josefson

=== Exhibition games ===
==== Game log ====
Exhibition games game log

Exhibition games: 1–1–0 (Home: 1–0–0; Road: 0–1–0)
Date	Opponent	Score	Goaltender	Venue	Attendance
September 17	Brynäs	3–5	Ridderwall	Lundahallen	600
September 19	Timrå	4–2	Wesslau	Hovet	1,484
February 23	Färjestad	–		Behrn Arena

Legend: Win Loss Tie

== Regular season ==
=== Standings ===
Elitserien	GP	W	L	T	OTW	OTL	GF	GA	Pts
y – HV71	55	25	16	5	6	3	188	155	95
x – Djurgårdens IF	55	26	17	7	2	3	161	130	92
x – Linköpings HC	55	27	20	3	3	2	163	139	92
x – Skellefteå AIK	55	26	20	4	1	4	146	141	88
x – Färjestads BK	55	25	20	3	2	5	132	144	87
x – Brynäs IF	55	20	17	11	6	1	144	124	84
x – Frölunda HC	55	22	22	9	1	1	155	156	78
x – Timrå IK	55	18	19	8	3	7	138	150	75
e – Modo Hockey	55	16	20	8	7	4	161	150	74
e – Luleå HF	55	19	23	2	4	7	139	143	74
r – Södertälje SK	55	14	27	4	7	3	131	176	63
r – Rögle BK	55	13	30	2	4	6	127	173	55

x – clinched playoff spot; y – clinched regular season league title; e – eliminated from playoff contention; r – played in relegation series

==== Game log ====
2009-10 Elitserien Game log (26–17–12)

September: 1–1–1 (Home: 0–0–1; Road: 1–1–0)
Round	Date	Opponent	Score	Goaltender	Venue	Attendance	Record	Pts	Recap
1	September 24	HV71	6 – 7	Wesslau	Kinnarps Arena	6,856	0–1–0	0
2	September 26	Modo	1 – 2	Wesslau	Hovet	8,094	0–1–1	1
3	September 29	Skellefteå	2 – 1	Wesslau	Skellefteå Kraft Arena	5,123	1–1–1	4

October: 6–6–1 (Home: 3–3–1; Road: 3–3–0)
Round	Date	Opponent	Score	Goaltender	Venue	Attendance	Record	Pts	Recap
4	October 1	Frölunda	5 – 1	Ridderwall	Scandinavium	10,102	2–1–1	7
5	October 3	Brynäs	4 – 4	Wesslau	Hovet	8,094	2–1–2	8
6	October 6	Linköping	2 – 1	Wesslau	Hovet	6,011	3–1–2	11
7	October 8	Luleå	3 – 4	Wesslau	Coop Norrbotten Arena	5,253	3–2–2	11
8	October 10	Färjestad	1 – 2	Ridderwall	Löfbergs Lila Arena	6,647	3–3–2	11
9	October 15	Rögle	1 – 3	Wesslau	Hovet	5,875	3–4–2	11
10	October 17	Timrå	3 – 2	Wesslau	E.ON Arena	4,717	4–4–2	14
16	October 20	HV71	3 – 2	Ridderwall	Hovet	6,788	5–4–2	17
11	October 22	Södertälje	1 – 2	Wesslau	Hovet	6,407	5–5–2	17
12	October 24	Rögle	3 – 1	Wesslau	Lindab Arena	4,692	6–5–2	20
13	October 27	Skellefteå AIK	2 – 3	Wesslau	Hovet	7,835	6–6–2	20
14	October 29	Brynäs	1 – 3	Ridderwall	Läkerol Arena	6,327	6–7–2	20
15	October 31	Timrå	3 – 1	Ridderwall	Hovet	7,218	7–7–2	23

November: 4–3–2 (Home: 3–1–0; Road: 1–2–2)
17	November 10	Modo	2 – 2	Wesslau	Swedbank Arena	5,189	7–7–3	24
18	November 12	Luleå	6 – 3	Ridderwall	Hovet	6,003	8–7–3	27
19	November 14	Södertälje	3 – 1	Wesslau	AXA Sports Center	4,866	9–7–3	30
20	November 17	Frölunda	3 – 1	Ridderwall	Hovet	7,397	10–7–3	33
21	November 19	Linköping	1 – 4	Wesslau	Cloetta Center	6,843	10–8–3	33
22	November 21	Färjestad	0 – 1	Wesslau	Hovet	8,094	10–9–3	33
23	November 23	Timrå	3 – 4	Wesslau	E.ON Arena	4,614	10–10–3	33
24	November 26	Brynäs	5 – 2	Ridderwall	Hovet	6,971	11–10–3	36
25	November 28	Frölunda	3 – 3	Ridderwall	Scandinavium	11,492	11–10–4	37

December: 5–2–2 (Home: 2–0–2; Road: 3–2–0)
Round	Date	Opponent	Score	Goaltender	Venue	Attendance	Record	Pts	Recap
31	December 1	Färjestad	2 – 4	Ridderwall	Löfbergs Lila Arena	5,708	11–11–4	37
26	December 3	Modo	2 – 2	Ridderwall	Hovet	8,094	11–11–5	38
27	December 5	Luleå	4 – 2	Ridderwall	Coop Norrbotten Arena	5,708	12–11–5	41
28	December 7	Skellefteå	3 – 0	Wesslau	Skellefteå Kraft Arena	4,393	13–11–5	44
29	December 10	Rögle	5 – 1	Ridderwall	Hovet	6,237	14–11–5	47
30	December 12	Södertälje	3 – 1	Ridderwall	Hovet	6,518	15–11–5	50
32	December 26	Linköping	2 – 3	Ridderwall	Hovet	7,567	15–11–6	51
33	December 28	HV71	2 – 3	Wesslau	Kinnarps Arena	7,000	15–12–6	51
34	December 30	Rögle	2 – 1	Ridderwall	Lindab Arena	4,804	16–12–6	54

January: 6–3–2 (Home: 4–1–2; Road: 2–2–0)
Round	Date	Opponent	Score	Goaltender	Venue	Attendance	Record	Pts	Recap
35	January 2	Färjestad	3 – 2	Ridderwall	Hovet	8,094	16–12–7	56
36	January 5	Skellefteå	4 – 0	Wesslau	Hovet	6,204	17–12–7	59
37	January 7	Modo	7 – 2	Wesslau	Fjällräven Center	6,337	18–12–7	62
38	January 9	Timrå	4 – 2	Wesslau	Hovet	6,666	19–12–7	65
39	January 14	Luleå	1 – 3	Wesslau	Hovet	5,774	19–13–7	65
40	January 18	Linköping	4 – 7	Ridderwall	Cloetta Center	6,626	19–14–7	65
41	January 21	Frölunda	4 – 3	Ridderwall	Hovet	6,341	20–14–7	68
42	January 23	Brynäs	1 – 4	Ridderwall	Läkerol Arena	7,748	20–15–7	68
43	January 25	HV71	3 – 3	Wesslau	Hovet	7,272	20–15–8	69
44	January 28	Södertälje	3 – 1	Wesslau	AXA Sports Center	4,652	21–15–8	72
45	January 30	Rögle	6 – 2	Wesslau	Hovet	6,486	22–15–8	75

February: 2–1–1 (Home: 2–0–0; Road: 0–1–1)
Round	Date	Opponent	Score	Goaltender	Venue	Attendance	Record	Pts	Recap
46	February 4	Färjestad	2 – 3	Wesslau	Löfbergs Lila Arena	6,955	22–15–9	76
47	February 6	Modo	4 – 1	Ridderwall	Hovet	8,094	23–15–9	79
48	February 8	HV71	3 – 5	Ridderwall	Kinnarps Arena	6,950	23–16–9	79
49	February 27	Södertälje	5 – 4	Ridderwall	Hovet	7,269	24–16–9	82

March: 2–1–3 (Home: 0–0–2; Road: 1–1–0)
Round	Date	Opponent	Score	Goaltender	Venue	Attendance	Record	Pts	Recap
50	March 2	Brynäs	1 – 1	Wesslau	Hovet	7,490	24–16–10	83
51	March 4	Skellefteå	3 – 4	Wesslau	Skellefteå Kraft Arena	4,493	24–17–10	83
52	March 6	Luleå	1 – 0	Wesslau	Coop Norrbotten Arena	5,154	25–17–10	86
53	March 8	Linköping	3 – 2	Wesslau	Hovet	7,027	25–17–11	88
54	March 11	Timrå	2 – 2	Ridderwall	E.ON Arena	5,896	25–17–12	89
55	March 13	Frölunda	5 – 2	Wesslau	Scandinavium	11,394	26–17–12	92

Legend: Win (3 points) Overtime win (2 point) Loss (0 points) Overtime loss (1 point) Tie (1 point)

== Playoffs ==
=== Game log ===
2010 Playoffs game log

Quarterfinals vs. Brynäs: 4–1 Win (Home: 2–1; Road: 2–0)
Date	Opponent	Score	Goaltender	Venue	Attendance	Series	Recap
March 18	Brynäs	4 – 3	Wesslau	Läkerol Arena	7,251	1–0
March 20	Brynäs	1 – 2 OT	Wesslau	Hovet	8,094 (100%)	1–1
March 22	Brynäs	4 – 0	Wesslau	Läkerol Arena	8,138	2–1
March 24	Brynäs	2 – 1	Wesslau	Hovet	8,094 (100%)	3–1
March 26	Brynäs	3 – 2	Wesslau	Ericsson Globe	13,850 (100%)	4–1

Semifinals vs. Linköping: 4–1 Win (Home: 3–0; Road: 1–1)
Date	Opponent	Score	Goaltender	Venue	Attendance	Series	Recap
April 1	Linköping	3 – 1	Wesslau	Cloetta Center	6,522	1–0
April 3	Linköping	3 – 2 OT	Wesslau	Hovet	7,696 (95%)	2–0
April 5	Linköping	0 – 2	Wesslau	Cloetta Center	7,696	2–1
April 7	Linköping	2 – 1 OT	Wesslau	Ericsson Globe	13,850 (100%)	3–1
April 8	Linköping	5 – 1	Wesslau	Ericsson Globe	13,050	4–1

Finals vs. HV71: 2–4 Loss (Home: 1–2; Road: 1–2)
Date	Opponent	Score	Goaltender	Venue	Attendance	Series	Recap
15 April	HV71	4 – 3	Wesslau	Hovet	8,094 (100%)	1–0
17 April	HV71	3 – 4 OT	Ridderwall	Kinnarps Arena	7,000	1–1
19 April	HV71	1 – 2 OT	Wesslau	Ericsson Globe	13,850 (100%)	1–2
21 April	HV71	3 – 2 OT	Wesslau	Kinnarps Arena	7,000	2–2
22 April	HV71	4 – 5 OT	Wesslau	Kinnarps Arena	7,000	2–3
24 April	HV71	2 – 3 OT	Wesslau	Hovet	8,094 (100%)	2–4

Legend: Win Loss |}

== Statistics ==
from stats.swehockey

=== Skaters ===
Name	Pos	Nationality	GP	G	A	P	PIM	GP	G	A	P	PIM
Name	Pos	Nationality	Regular season					Playoffs				
Marcus Nilson	LW	SWE	53	24	27	51	32	16	4	9	13	6
Jimmie Ölvestad	RW	SWE	48	17	14	31	54	16	6	5	11	10
Kyle Klubertanz	D	USA	55	12	19	31	32	16	3	2	5	18
Marcus Krüger	C	SWE	38	11	20	31	14	16	3	7	10	6
Andreas Engqvist	C	SWE	55	14	12	26	30	16	5	8	13	10
Kristofer Ottosson	C	SWE	55	12	14	26	16	16	3	1	4	0
Timmy Pettersson	D	SWE	55	4	20	24	46	16	2	7	9	4
Andreas Holmqvist	D	SWE	51	3	21	24	84	15	3	3	6	12
Nichlas Falk	D/C	SWE	53	2	20	22	38	16	3	2	5	4
Nicklas Danielsson	LW	SWE	55	10	10	20	42	16	4	4	8	8
Jacob Josefson	C	SWE	43	8	12	20	20	14	3	2	5	4
Marcus Ragnarsson	D	SWE	37	5	15	20	44	16	1	4	5	18
Michael Holmqvist	C	SWE	52	9	9	18	20	9	0	2	2	2
Tim Eriksson	LW	SWE	55	7	10	17	22	16	0	5	5	10
Patrick Cehlin	RW	SWE	54	5	6	11	10	16	0	2	2	2
Mike Zigomanis	C	CAN	27	4	7	11	12	5	0	0	0	8
Christian Eklund	RW	SWE	52	4	7	11	32	16	2	1	3	14
David Printz	D	SWE	55	2	5	7	71	16	0	1	1	10
Daniel Brodin	LW	SWE	30	2	3	5	26	16	0	0	0	2
Mika Hannula	RW	SWE	7	3	1	4	0	—	—	—	—	—
Mathias Tjärnqvist	RW	SWE	18	2	2	4	8	16	1	2	3	8
Oscar Eklund	D	SWE	53	1	3	4	32	16	1	3	4	0
Henrik Eriksson	LW	SWE	34	0	4	4	6	—	—	—	—	—
Alexander Deilert	D	SWE	26	0	1	1	0	5	0	0	0	0
Gustaf Wesslau	G	SWE	55	0	1	1	0	15	0	0	0	0
Arvid Strömberg	RW	SWE	1	0	0	0	0	—	—	—	—	—
Simon Mitman	LW	SWE	1	0	0	0	0	—	—	—	—	—
Kim Lennhammer	D	SWE	2	0	0	0	0	—	—	—	—	—
Carl Ackered	D	SWE	2	0	0	0	0	—	—	—	—	—
Stefan Söder	C	SWE	6	0	0	0	0	—	—	—	—	—
Mark Owuya	G	SWE	3	0	0	0	0	1	0	0	0	0
John Norman	C	SWE	7	0	0	0	0	—	—	—	—	—
Niklas Andersson	D	SWE	7	0	0	0	0	—	—	—	—	—
Carl Gustafsson	RW	SWE	12	0	0	0	0	—	—	—	—	—
Stefan Ridderwall	G	SWE	52	0	0	0	0	16	0	0	0	0

=== Goaltenders ===
Name	Pos	Nationality	GP	SVS%	GAA	SO	GP	SVS%	GAA	SO
Name	Pos	Nationality	Regular season				Playoffs			
Gustaf Wesslau	G	Sweden	32	91,7	2,29	2	15	93,97	1,80	1
Stefan Ridderwall	G	Sweden	26	91,69	2,30	0	2	87,80	3,97	0

== Transfers ==
Acquired by Djurgårdens IF
Player	Former team	Notes
F (Sweden) Marcus Nilson	(Russia) Lokomotiv Yaroslavl	
F (Sweden) Marcus Krüger	(Sweden) Djurgården J-20	
D (United States) Kyle Klubertanz	(Finland) TPS	
F (Sweden) Mathias Tjärnqvist	(Sweden) Rögle BK	
F (Canada) Mike Zigomanis	(Canada) Toronto Marlies	
F (Sweden) Mika Hannula	Free Agent	
F (Sweden) Patrick Cehlin	(Sweden) Djurgården J-20	
F (Sweden) Daniel Brodin	(Sweden) Djurgården J-20	
G (Sweden) Mark Owuya	(Sweden) Djurgården J-20	

Leaving Djurgårdens IF
Player	New team	Notes
F (Sweden) Robin Figren	(United States) New York Islanders	
F (Sweden) Fredrik Bremberg	(Russia) Atlant	
F (Sweden) Niklas Anger	(Sweden) Timrå IK	
D (United States) David Schneider	(Switzerland) HC Ambri-Piotta	
D (Sweden) Ronnie Pettersson	Retired	
D (Sweden) Alexander Deilert	(Sweden) Mora IK (loan)	
F (Sweden) Mika Hannula	(Russia) Salavat Yulaev Ufa	

== Drafted players ==
Djurgården players picked at the 2010 NHL entry draft.

Round	Pick	Player	Nationality	NHL team
5th	126th	Patrick Cehlin	Sweden	Nashville Predators
5th	146th	Daniel Brodin	Sweden	Toronto Maple Leafs
