= Tjärnqvist =

Tjärnqvist is a surname. Notable people with the surname include:

- Daniel Tjärnqvist (born 1976), Swedish ice hockey player
- Mathias Tjärnqvist (born 1979), Swedish ice hockey player
