= Christian Eklund =

Swedish ice hockey player

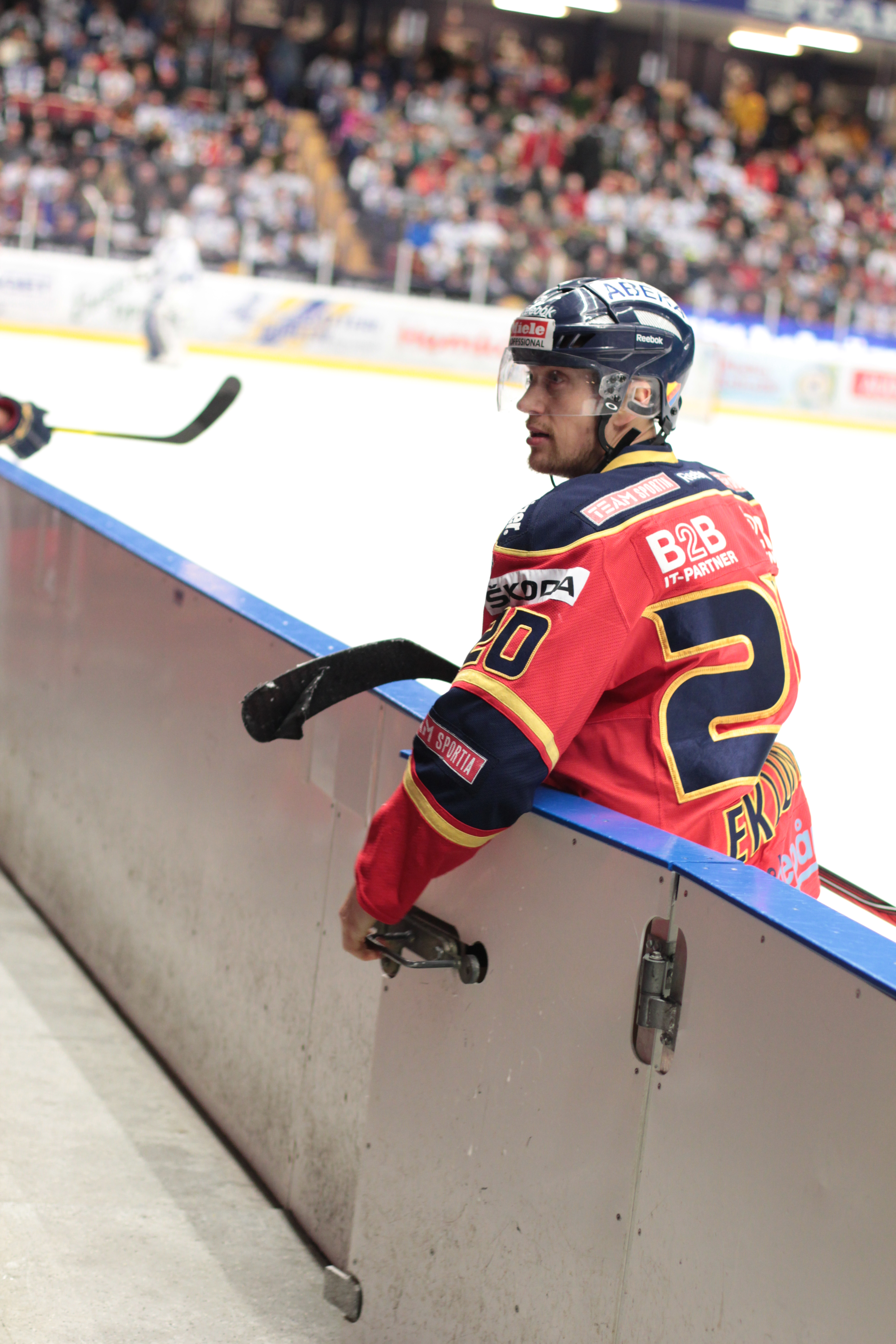
- Eklund in 2012.
- Born: July 24, 1977 (age 49) Haninge, Sweden
- Height: 5 ft 11.5 in (182 cm)
- Weight: 185 lb (84 kg; 13 st 3 lb)
- Position: Left wing
- Shot: Left
- Played for: Djurgårdens IF; Augsburger Panther (DEL)
- Playing career: 1998–2013

Christian Eklund (born July 24, 1977), nicknamed Fimpen ("the cigarette butt"), is a Swedish former professional ice hockey player.

== Playing career ==
He played a total of 429 Elitserien games as a left wing for Djurgårdens IF. Eklund retired in 2013 after suffering a neck injury. He was awarded player of the season for the 2010–11 season by Järnkaminerna, the official supporter club of Djurgården.

== Personal life ==
Eklund is father of William and Victor Eklund, who both played for Djurgården. William currently plays for the Ottawa Senators and Victor for the New York Islanders in the National Hockey League (NHL).

== Career statistics ==
			Regular Season					Playoffs
Season	Team	League	GP	G	A	Pts	PIM	GP	G	A	Pts	PIM
1994–95	Djurgårdens IF	J20 SuperElit	9	0	0	0	2	—	—	—	—	—
1995–96	Djurgårdens IF	J20 SuperElit	28	9	10	19	10	—	—	—	—	—
1996–97	Djurgårdens IF	J20 SuperElit	28	16	20	36	60	—	—	—	—	—
1997–98	Haninge HC	Division 1	32	7	9	16	51	—	—	—	—	—
1998–99	Huddinge IK	Division 1	27	7	2	9	16	—	—	—	—	—
1998–99	Huddinge IK	Allsvenskan	11	1	1	2	8	—	—	—	—	—
1999–00	Huddinge IK	Allsvenskan	4	0	0	0	25	—	—	—	—	—
1999–00	Huddinge IK	Allsvenskan	4	0	0	0	25	—	—	—	—	—
1999–00	Sunne IK	Allsvenskan	32	7	6	13	46	—	—	—	—	—
2000–01	IK Oskarshamn	Allsvenskan	42	21	23	44	73	14	2	4	6	18
2001–02	Tingsryds AIF	Allsvenskan	32	10	18	28	56	4	1	2	3	4
2001–02	Djurgårdens IF	Elitserien	4	1	0	1	0	5	0	0	0	14
2002–03	Djurgårdens IF	Elitserien	45	11	5	16	65	7	0	0	0	27
2003–04	Djurgårdens IF	Elitserien	42	8	9	17	56	4	0	0	0	6
2004–05	Djurgårdens IF	Elitserien	49	3	6	9	74	12	0	0	0	12
2005–06	Augsburger Panther	DEL	48	6	22	28	58	—	—	—	—	—
2006–07	Djurgårdens IF	Elitserien	49	7	5	12	67	—	—	—	—	—
2007–08	Djurgårdens IF	Elitserien	48	10	11	21	91	5	0	1	1	29
2008–09	Djurgårdens IF	Elitserien	39	5	5	10	30	—	—	—	—	—
2009–10	Djurgårdens IF	Elitserien	52	4	7	11	32	16	2	1	3	14
2010–11	Djurgårdens IF	Elitserien	53	4	10	14	44	7	0	0	0	6
