= William Eklund =

Swedish ice hockey player (born 2002)

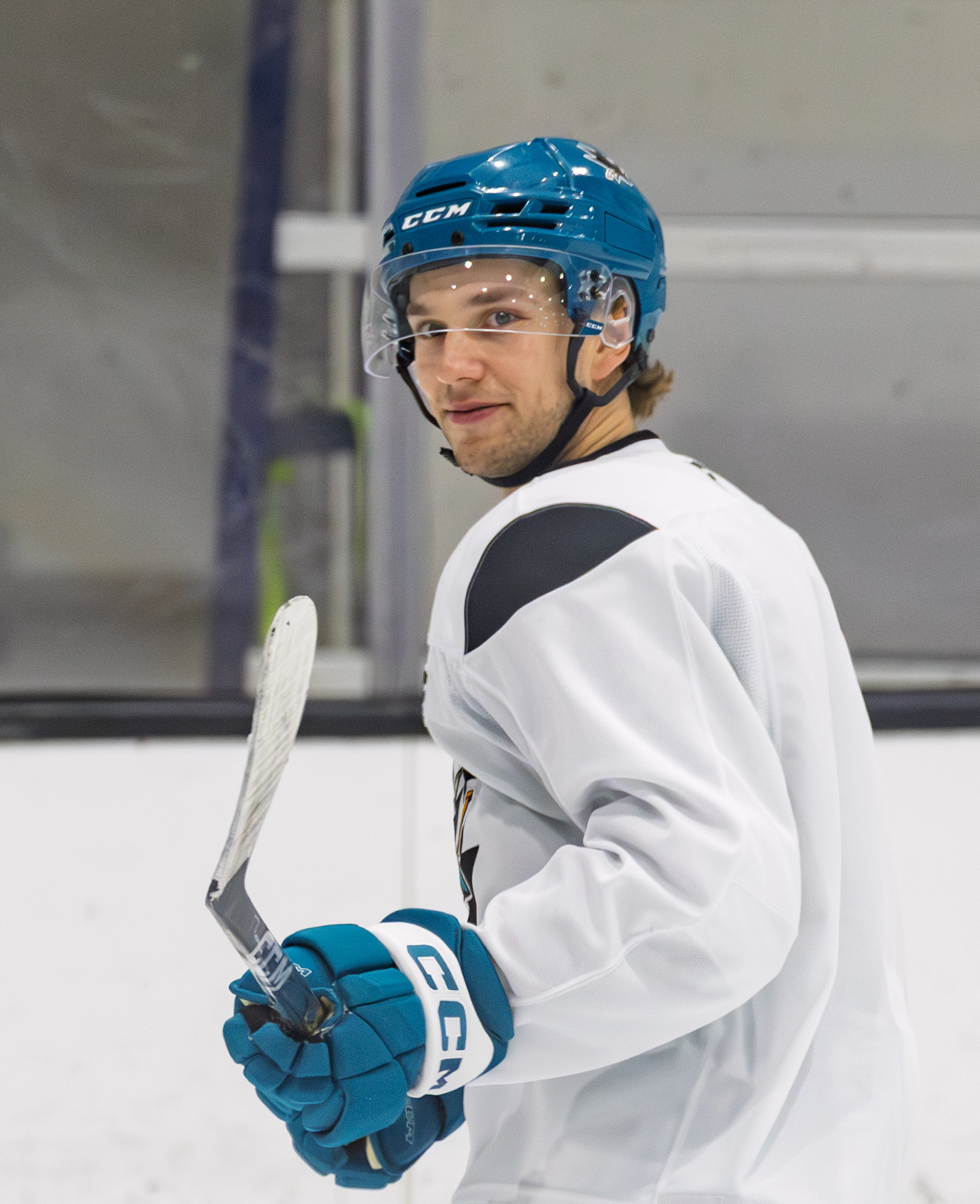
- Eklund with the San Jose Sharks in April 2026
- Born: 12 October 2002 (age 24) Haninge, Sweden
- Height: 5 ft 10 in (178 cm)
- Weight: 185 lb (84 kg; 13 st 3 lb)
- Position: Forward
- Shoots: Left
- NHL team Former teams: Ottawa Senators; Djurgårdens IF; San Jose Sharks
- NHL draft: 7th overall, 2021; San Jose Sharks
- Playing career: 2020–present

William Eklund (born 12 October 2002) is a Swedish professional ice hockey player who is a forward for the Ottawa Senators of the National Hockey League (NHL). Considered the top international prospect for the 2021 NHL entry draft by NHL Central Scouting, he was selected seventh overall by the San Jose Sharks.

== Playing career ==
=== Djurgårdens IF ===
Eklund joined the Djurgårdens IF team in the J20 Nationell in the 2018–19 season and made 44 appearances with the team over two seasons, scoring 13 goals and 26 assists for 29 points. He made his senior debut for Djurgården in the Swedish Hockey League (SHL) on 4 January 2020, in a 4–2 win away against IK Oskarshamn. He played a total of 20 regular season games and scoring two points during the rest of the 2019–20 SHL season. However, on 15 March, the Swedish Hockey Association cancelled the remainder of the season due to the COVID-19 pandemic. In his first full season with Djurgården's senior team in 2020–21, he played in 40 games, scoring 11 goals and 23 points. He was named the SHL rookie of the year and Swedish Junior Hockey Player of the Year after leading all juniors in goals and second in points. The team made the playoffs and faced Frölunda HC in the opening round best-of-three series. Frölunda won the series two games to one and in the three playoff games, Eklund added one goal and two points. He rejoined Djurgården in the 2021–22 season and made 29 appearances, scoring just once and adding 14 points.

=== San Jose Sharks ===
Eklund was selected seventh overall by the San Jose Sharks of the National Hockey League (NHL) in the 2021 NHL entry draft. He was signed by the Sharks to a three-year, entry-level contract on 16 August 2021. He made his NHL debut on 16 October, in a 4–3 win over the Winnipeg Jets, where he also registered his first point, an assist. After playing nine games with the Sharks and registering four points, he was reassigned back to Sweden on 5 November.

To begin the 2022–23 season, Eklund was assigned to San Jose's American Hockey League (AHL) affiliate, the San Jose Barracuda, on 10 October 2022. He spent the majority of the season in the AHL, tallying 17 goals and 41 points in 54 games. He was recalled by the Sharks in March 2023 following a series of trades that cleared space on the NHL team. He scored his first NHL goal on 14 March, in a 6–5 overtime loss to the Columbus Blue Jackets. He was returned to the AHL on 18 March after recording two goals and three points in eight games. However, his return to the Barracuda was short-lived as he suffered a season-ending shoulder injury in a game against the Colorado Eagles on 22 March that required surgery to repair.

He opened the 2023–24 season on the Sharks roster, playing on the second line alongside Mikael Granlund and Luke Kunin. He recorded a three-point game on 5 December, recording two assists and scoring the overtime game winner in a 5–4 win over the New York Islanders. On 6 April 2024, he netted his first NHL hat trick, scoring all three of the team's goals in a 3–2 victory over the St. Louis Blues. He finished the season with 16 goals and 49 points in 80 games as the Sharks failed to make the playoffs. In the 2024–25 season, Eklund played with Granlund and Fabian Zetterlund. He recorded a three-point game on 14 January 2025 in a 6–3 victory over the Detroit Red Wings. He scored 17 goals and 58 points in 77 games as the Sharks failed to make the playoffs again.

On 1 July, he signed a three-year contract extension with the Sharks. In his first year of his deal in 2025–26, he recorded two three-point games early in the season on 23 and 26 October. He was placed on the team's shutdown line alongside Philipp Kurashev and Alexander Wennberg, scoring five goals and 11 points in the team's first 12 games before suffering a lower body injury in November. He returned to the lineup after missing four games on 11 November. He finished the season with 15 goals and 53 points in 78 games as the Sharks missed the playoffs for the third consecutive season of Eklund's career and seventh overall.

=== Ottawa Senators ===
On 23 June 2026, Eklund was traded to the Ottawa Senators alongside forwards Kasper Halttunen and Brandon Svoboda for a 2026 first-round pick. He made his Senators debut in the season opener on 3 October in a 3–2 victory over the Toronto Maple Leafs. He recorded his first goal and point for the Senators in his third game with the team on 6 October, a 5–3 loss to the Red Wings. In the next game on 8 October against the Philadelphia Flyers, Eklund suffered a significant ankle injury that took him out of the lineup.

== International play ==
Eklund was named for the preliminary Swedish junior team roster for the 2021 World Junior Championships, but tested positive for COVID-19, preventing him from joining the final roster for the tournament.

Eklund made his debut with the Sweden senior team on 28 April 2021, in a friendly game against Denmark where he scored one goal and made one assist. He was named to Sweden's roster for the 2025 World Championship, but got injured in a pre-tournament game.

== Personal life ==
Eklund is the son of former ice hockey player Christian Eklund, who also played for Djurgården. William's brother, Victor, is also an ice hockey player, who was drafted 16th overall by the New York Islanders in the 2025 NHL entry draft. Along with Victor, William has four younger step-siblings.

== Career statistics ==
=== Regular season and playoffs ===
			Regular season					Playoffs
Season	Team	League	GP	G	A	Pts	PIM	GP	G	A	Pts	PIM
2018–19	Djurgårdens IF	J20	13	1	2	3	6	8	2	6	0
2019–20	Djurgårdens IF	J20	31	12	24	36	22	—	—	—	—	—
2019–20	Djurgårdens IF	SHL	20	0	2	2	4	—	—	—	—	—
2020–21	Djurgårdens IF	SHL	40	11	12	23	2	3	1	1	2	2
2021–22	Djurgårdens IF	SHL	29	1	13	14	4	—	—	—	—	—
2021–22	San Jose Sharks	NHL	9	0	4	4	2	—	—	—	—	—
2022–23	San Jose Barracuda	AHL	54	17	24	41	43	—	—	—	—	—
2022–23	San Jose Sharks	NHL	8	2	1	3	6	—	—	—	—	—
2023–24	San Jose Sharks	NHL	80	16	29	45	30	—	—	—	—	—
2024–25	San Jose Sharks	NHL	77	17	41	58	29	—	—	—	—	—
2025–26	San Jose Sharks	NHL	78	15	38	53	32	—	—	—	—	—
SHL totals			89	12	27	39	10	3	1	1	2	2
NHL totals			252	50	113	163	99	—	—	—	—	—

=== International ===
Year	Team	Event	Result	GP	G	A	Pts	PIM
2019	Sweden	HG18	3rd place, bronze medalist(s)	5	1	2	3	2
Junior totals				5	1	2	3	2

== Awards and honours ==
Award	Year	Ref
SHL
Rookie of the Year	2021	
Swedish junior player of the year	2021	
NHL
E. J. McGuire Award of Excellence	2021	

Awards and achievements
Preceded by Jesper Frödén	Winner of the SHL Rookie of the Year award 2021	Succeeded by Linus Karlsson
Preceded by Ozzy Wiesblatt	San Jose Sharks first-round draft pick 2021	Succeeded by Filip Bystedt
