= Mark Owuya =

Swedish ice hockey player

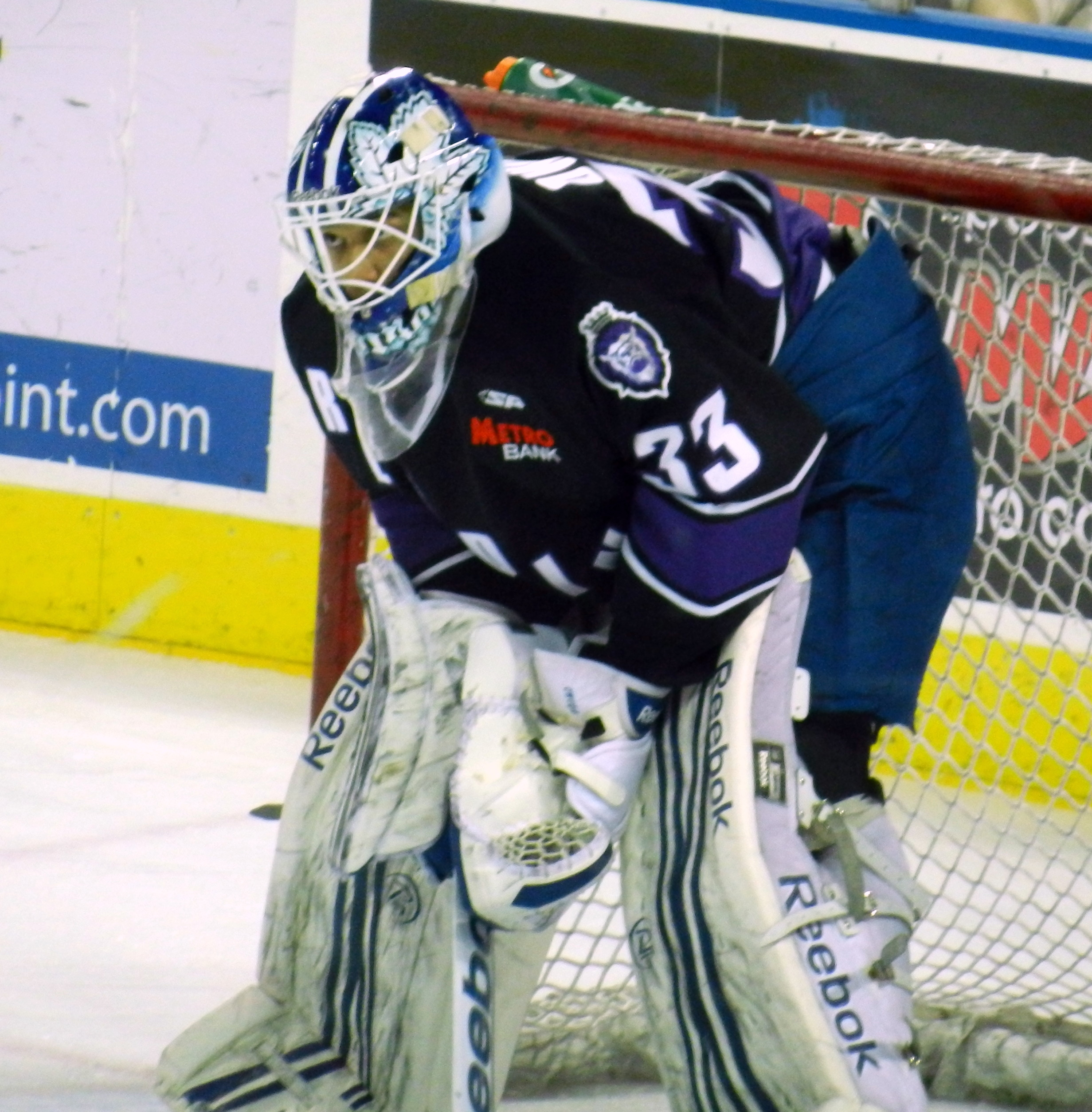
- Owuya playing for the Reading Royals in 2012
- Born: 18 July 1989 (age 37) Stockholm, Sweden
- Height: 6 ft 2 in (188 cm)
- Weight: 200 lb (91 kg; 14 st 4 lb)
- Position: Goaltender
- Catches: Left
- Played for: Djurgårdens IF; Toronto Marlies; Luleå HF; KHL Medveščak Zagreb
- NHL draft: Undrafted
- Playing career: 2008-2016; 2026–present

Mark Aloysius Opoya Owuya (born 18 July 1989) is a Swedish professional ice hockey goaltender who plays for Wings HC Arlanda in the HockeyEttan. He formerly played for KHL Medveščak Zagreb, a member of the Kontinental Hockey League.

== Playing career ==
Owuya began playing junior hockey with Djurgårdens IF in the 2005–06 season when he began playing with the U18 team. The following season Owuya played with both Djurgården's U18 and J20 team and also played most of the games with the Djurgården's J20 team in the 2007–08 season. While Stefan Ridderwall joined team Sweden for the 2008 World Junior Ice Hockey Championships, Owuya made his Elitserien debut on 3 January 2008, against Brynäs IF. He was loaned out to Mälarhöjden/Bredängs IK during the 2007–08 winter, and was also later loaned out to Almtuna IS for the entire 2008–09 season.

Owuya was also on loan during the 2009–10 season, first to Örebro HK and later Mora IK. In the 2010 pre-season, Owuya was moved up to Djurgården's senior team, to compete with goaltender Stefan Ridderwall to be the first choice in the goal. Ultimately, Owuya played in 32 out of 55 games in the 2010–11 Elitserien season, with a 2.18 goals against average and league-best save percentage of .927. He also played in all of Djurgården's seven playoff games, with a 1.66 goals against average and a .924 save percentage.

Following a ten year retirement, Owuya came back on August 7, 2026, signing for HockeyEttan club Wings HC Arlanda.

== International play ==
Medal record

Representing Sweden

Men's ice hockey

World Junior Championships
Silver medal – second place	2009 Ottawa	

Owuya represented Sweden at the 2009 World Junior Ice Hockey Championships.

== Personal ==
His father is from Uganda and his mother is from Russia. Mark's brother Sebastian was drafted by the Atlanta Thrashers in 2010. Owuya is also known in Sweden for rapping on popular talent show Idol as "Mark In Da Park".
