= Stefan Söder =

Swedish ice hockey player

- Born: 11 February 1990 (age 35); Stockholm, Sweden
- Height: 6 ft 0 in (183 cm)
- Weight: 176 lb (80 kg; 12 st 8 lb)
- Position: Forward
- Shoots: Right
- SEL team: Djurgårdens IF
- Playing career: 2010–present

Stefan Söder (born 11 February 1990 in Stockholm, Sweden) is a professional Swedish ice hockey player. He is currently a forward for Djurgårdens IF in Hockeyallsvenskan.

== Career statistics ==
			Regular season					Playoffs
Season	Team	League	GP	G	A	Pts	PIM	GP	G	A	Pts	PIM
2008–09	Djurgårdens IF	J20	41	19	14	33	35	5	2	0	2	0
2009–10	Djurgårdens IF	J20	41	23	16	39	110	-	-	-	-	-
2009–10	Djurgårdens IF	SEL	6	0	0	0	0	0	0	0	0	0
