= Daniel Widing =

Swedish ice hockey player

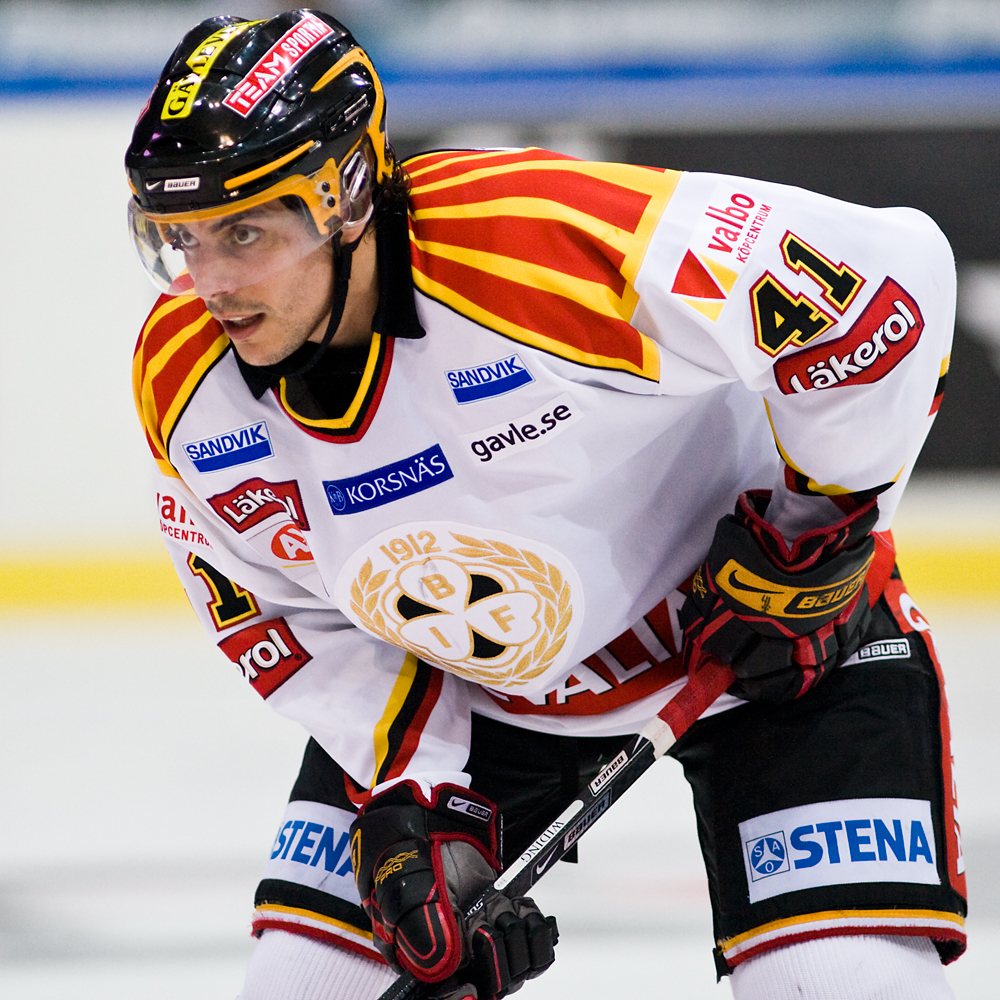
- Born: April 13, 1982 (age 44) Gävle, Sweden
- Height: 6 ft 0 in (183 cm)
- Weight: 209 lb (95 kg; 14 st 13 lb)
- Position: Centre/Right Wing
- Shot: Right
- SHL team Former teams: Rögle BK; Leksands IF; Lahti Pelicans; TPS; Brynäs IF; Milwaukee Admirals; HC Davos; Djurgårdens IF; Espoo Blues; Skellefteå AIK; Grizzlys Wolfsburg
- National team: Sweden
- NHL draft: 36th overall, 2000; Nashville Predators
- Playing career: 1999–2020

Daniel Widing (born April 13, 1982) is a Swedish professional ice hockey player. He is currently a right winger for Rögle BK in the Swedish Hockey League (SHL). He was originally drafted 36th overall by the Nashville Predators in the 2000 NHL entry draft.

Widing joined Skellefteå after a single season in 2013-14 with Finnish Liiga club, Espoo Blues on June 13, 2014.

== International play ==
Widing played for Sweden at the 2001 and 2002 World Junior Ice Hockey Championships, and the 2008 IIHF World Championship.

== Career statistics ==
=== Regular season and playoffs ===
			Regular season					Playoffs
Season	Team	League	GP	G	A	Pts	PIM	GP	G	A	Pts	PIM
1996–97	Hedemora SK	SWE.3	2	1	1	2	0	—	—	—	—	—
1997–98	Hedemora SK	SWE.3	17	0	2	2		—	—	—	—	—
1998–99	Leksands IF	J18 Allsv
1999–2000	Leksands IF	J18 Allsv	1	2	0	2	2	5	0	1	1	18
1999–2000	Leksands IF	J20	34	15	12	27	65	2	1	0	1	4
1999–2000	Leksands IF	SEL	3	0	0	0	2	—	—	—	—	—
2000–01	Leksands IF	J20	6	2	3	5	31	—	—	—	—	—
2000–01	Leksands IF	SEL	40	6	5	11	18	—	—	—	—	—
2001–02	Leksands IF	Allsv	45	12	12	24	92	10	0	0	0	6
2001–02	Leksands IF	J20	—	—	—	—	—	3	2	6	8	2
2002–03	Leksands IF	J20	2	0	1	1	4	—	—	—	—	—
2002–03	Leksands IF	SEL	47	2	2	4	8	5	0	0	0	2
2003–04	Pelicans	SM-liiga	54	6	7	13	62	—	—	—	—	—
2004–05	Pelicans	SM-liiga	56	13	15	28	74	—	—	—	—	—
2005–06	TPS	SM-liiga	38	5	7	12	35	—	—	—	—	—
2005–06	Brynäs IF	SEL	11	1	1	2	2	4	1	0	1	33
2006–07	Milwaukee Admirals	AHL	3	0	0	0	4	—	—	—	—	—
2006–07	Brynäs IF	SEL	31	3	4	7	32	7	1	1	2	14
2007–08	Brynäs IF	SEL	54	23	11	34	99	—	—	—	—	—
2008–09	Brynäs IF	SEL	54	23	14	37	97	4	2	0	2	4
2009–10	HC Davos	NLA	45	19	15	34	34	6	2	2	4	2
2010–11	Djurgårdens IF	SEL	52	10	11	21	55	7	1	0	1	2
2011–12	Brynäs IF	SEL	55	12	8	20	22	17	4	2	6	8
2012–13	Brynäs IF	SEL	53	10	8	18	56	4	2	1	3	0
2013–14	Blues	Liiga	55	10	7	17	16	7	1	0	1	2
2014–15	Skellefteå AIK	SHL	53	9	7	16	20	12	3	1	4	4
2015–16	Grizzly Adams Wolfsburg	DEL	51	16	15	31	16	11	2	1	3	12
2016–17	Rögle BK	SHL	19	7	4	11	10	—	—	—	—	—
2017–18	Rögle BK	SHL	49	6	6	12	22	—	—	—	—	—
2018–19	Djurgårdens IF	SHL	7	0	0	0	0	—	—	—	—	—
2018–19	Rögle BK	SHL	39	6	4	10	37	2	1	0	1	2
2019–20	Luleå HF	SHL	12	1	0	1	2	—	—	—	—	—
2019–20	Rögle BK	SHL	23	0	1	1	2	—	—	—	—	—
SEL/SHL totals			603	119	86	205	484	62	15	5	20	69
SM-liiga/Liiga totals			203	34	36	70	187	7	1	0	1	2

=== International ===
Year	Team	Event	Result	GP	G	A	Pts	PIM
2000	Sweden	WJC18	3rd place, bronze medalist(s)	6	0	2	2	10
2001	Sweden	WJC	4th	7	0	1	1	8
2002	Sweden	WJC	6th	7	3	2	5	8
2008	Sweden	WC	4th	3	0	0	0	0
Junior totals				20	3	5	8	26
Senior totals				3	0	0	0	0
