= Josef Boumedienne =

Swedish ice hockey player (born 1978)

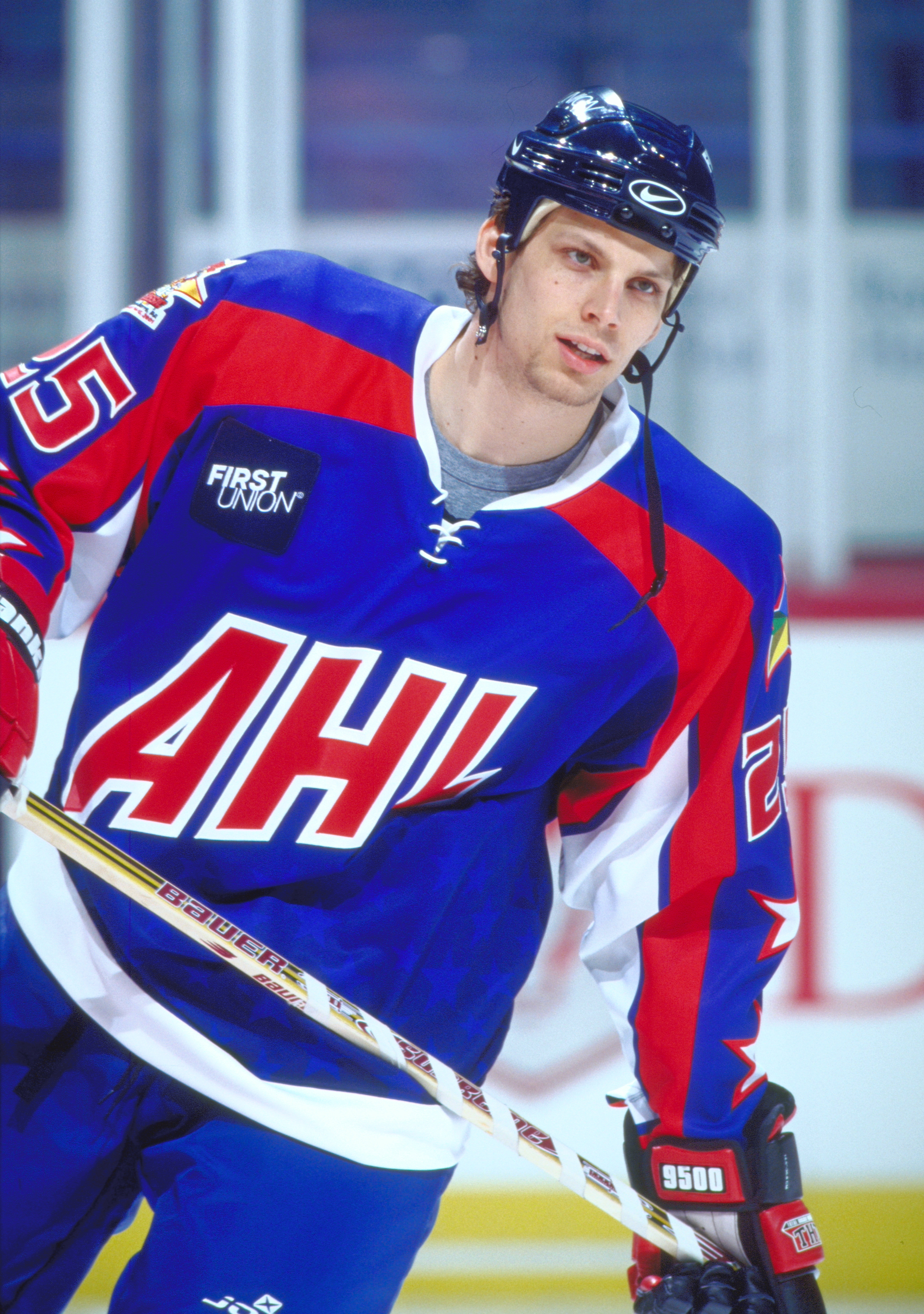
- Born: 12 January 1978 (age 48) Stockholm, Sweden
- Height: 6 ft 1 in (185 cm)
- Weight: 200 lb (91 kg; 14 st 4 lb)
- Position: Defence
- Shot: Left
- Played for: Södertälje SK; Tappara; New Jersey Devils; Tampa Bay Lightning; Washington Capitals; Brynäs IF; Oulun Kärpät; ZSC Lions; Dinamo Minsk; EV Zug; Djurgårdens IF; Jokerit; Slovan Bratislava
- NHL draft: 91st overall, 1996; New Jersey Devils
- Playing career: 1996–2013

Josef Sami Boumedienne (born 12 January 1978) is a Swedish and Finnish hockey coach/scout and former professional hockey defenceman. He played in the National Hockey League (NHL) with the New Jersey Devils, Tampa Bay Lightning and Washington Capitals. He is currently the general manager for the Sweden men's national ice hockey team.

== Playing career ==
Boumedienne started his career playing for Huddinge IK in the Swedish Allsvenskan in the season 1995–96. He was drafted by the New Jersey Devils in the 1996 NHL entry draft as their third-round pick, #91 overall. Boumedienne moved to play for Södertälje SK in the Elitserien. After two seasons with Södertälje SK he went to play with Tappara in the Finnish SM-liiga.

Boumedienne played two seasons with Tappara and in the 1999–00 season he led the team's defenders with 8 goals and 24 assists for 32 points. In the 2000–01 season he moved to the NHL, playing his first season on New Jersey's farm team, the Albany River Rats in the AHL. The next season he made his NHL debut on 6 October 2001 and played one game with New Jersey Devils, scoring his first NHL goal. In November 2001 the Devils traded Boumedienne along with Sascha Goc and Anton Butin to the Tampa Bay Lightning, in exchange for Andrei Zyuzin.

Boumedienne played three games with the Lightning, playing mainly with the Lightning's farm team, the Springfield Falcons. In 2002 Tampa Bay traded Boumedienne to the Ottawa Senators for a seventh-round draft pick. He played with the Senators organization until December 2002, when the Senators traded him to the Washington Capitals for Dean Melanson. He started his Capitals career playing mainly on the Capitals' farm team Portland Pirates, playing six games with the Capitals. In the 2003–04 season he continued with the Capitals, playing 37 games with the team. After a successful season he received a one-year contract extension from the Capitals.

In the NHL lockout season of 2004–05, Boumedienne started his season with Brynäs IF in Sweden's Elitserien. Only 13 games later, he moved to the SM-liiga when SML-team Kärpät acquired him. He won the Finnish championship with the team. In the 2005–06 season he started with the Zürich Lions in the Swiss NLA, but was released by the team after 17 games, where he scored 1 goal and 10 assists. According to the Zürich Lions, Boumedienne's defending was poor, leading to his release. He played the rest of the season with Södertälje SK, in the Elitserien.

Boumedienne signed a two-year contract with Kärpät in November 2006. He missed the start of the season due to abdominal surgery. In April 2007 Boumedienne won his second Finnish championship with Kärpät.

In the summer 2007 Boumedienne signed a one-year, one-way contract with the Washington Capitals. He played the entire season with the Hershey Bears. In the 2008–09 season he moved to the Toronto Maple Leafs organization, playing 19 games with the Toronto Marlies. After this he returned to SM-liiga, winning his third SM-medal, gaining a silver with Kärpät.

For the 2009–10 season Boumedienne started with Dynamo Minsk in the KHL. However, he was released by Minsk, even though he led all Minsk defenders in points, with 7 points in 17 games.

In 2010 Boumedienne moved to play with EV Zug in the NLA. After the season Djurgårdens IF acquired Boumedienne on a one-year contract, with an option for 2011–12. On 30 January 2012, Finnish club Jokerit acquired Boumedienne and signed him to a contract for the rest of the season.

Boumedienne's last season of his professional career was in 2012–13, initially with HC Bratislava Slovan of the Kontinental Hockey League, finishing with Oulun Kärpät in the SM-liiga.

== Scouting and coaching career ==
Boumedienne was hired as a scout by the Columbus Blue Jackets in 2013, and was then promoted to Director of European Scouting in 2016. He served as a scout for Lukko, and a late-season head coaching position with Brynäs in 2021 to keep them from being relegated. He was promoted to Director of Pro Scouting with Columbus in 2021.

In 2022, it was announced that Boumedienne was hired as the assistant general manager for the Swedish men's national ice hockey team. In this position, he served as the general manager for Team Sweden during the 2025 4 Nations Face-Off.

In October 2023, Boumedienne was hired as an assistant coach for the Columbus Blue Jackets in the aftermath of Pascal Vincent's promotion to head coach. Before he was hired, he was serving as a head coach for the Ohio AAA Blue Jackets' 14U team.

== International ==
Boumedienne played for Sweden's national team at the European Hockey Tour, and has held Finnish nationality in addition since 2004.

== Personal ==
Boumedienne is the son of an Algerian father and a Finnish mother. He is married and has three sons. One son, Sascha, was drafted with the 28th pick in the 2025 NHL Draft by the Winnipeg Jets.

== Career statistics ==
=== Regular season and playoffs ===
			Regular season					Playoffs
Season	Team	League	GP	G	A	Pts	PIM	GP	G	A	Pts	PIM
1996–97	Södertälje SK	SEL	32	1	1	2	32	—	—	—	—	—
1997–98	Södertälje SK	SEL	26	3	3	6	28	—	—	—	—	—
1998–99	Tappara	SM-l	51	6	8	14	119	—	—	—	—	—
1999–00	Tappara	SM-l	50	8	24	32	160	4	1	2	3	10
2000–01	Albany River Rats	AHL	79	8	29	37	117	—	—	—	—	—
2001–02	Albany River Rats	AHL	9	0	3	3	10	—	—	—	—	—
2001–02	New Jersey Devils	NHL	1	1	0	1	2	—	—	—	—	—
2001–02	Springfield Falcons	AHL	53	7	25	32	57	—	—	—	—	—
2001–02	Tampa Bay Lightning	NHL	3	0	0	0	4	—	—	—	—	—
2002–03	Binghamton Senators	AHL	26	2	15	17	62	—	—	—	—	—
2002–03	Portland Pirates	AHL	44	8	22	30	77	—	—	—	—	—
2002–03	Washington Capitals	NHL	6	1	0	1	0	—	—	—	—	—
2003–04	Portland Pirates	AHL	13	1	8	9	10	—	—	—	—	—
2003–04	Washington Capitals	NHL	37	2	12	14	30	—	—	—	—	—
2004–05	Brynäs IF	SEL	13	6	0	6	43	—	—	—	—	—
2004–05	Oulun Kärpät	SM-l	32	5	10	15	58	12	1	5	6	12
2005–06	ZSC Lions	NLA	17	1	10	11	24	—	—	—	—	—
2005–06	Södertälje SK	SEL	26	1	19	20	62	—	—	—	—	—
2006–07	Oulun Kärpät	SM-l	18	2	2	4	36	10	1	3	4	16
2007–08	Hershey Bears	AHL	52	7	35	42	81	1	0	0	0	2
2008–09	Oulun Kärpät	SM-l	17	3	7	10	32	—	—	—	—	—
2008–09	Toronto Marlies	AHL	19	0	7	7	29	—	—	—	—	—
2009–10	Dinamo Minsk	KHL	17	0	7	7	30	—	—	—	—	—
2009–10	EV Zug	NLA	7	0	4	4	8	—	—	—	—	—
2010–11	Djurgårdens IF	SEL	52	5	25	30	73	7	0	3	3	6
2011–12	Djurgårdens IF	SEL	36	2	15	17	32	—	—	—	—	—
2011–12	Jokerit	SM-l	16	1	7	8	26	10	3	3	6	18
2012–13	Slovan Bratislava	KHL	17	0	2	2	18	—	—	—	—	—
2012–13	Oulun Kärpät	SM-l	14	0	1	1	6	3	0	3	3	4
NHL totals			47	4	12	16	36	—	—	—	—	—

=== International ===
Year	Team	Event	Result	GP	G	A	Pts	PIM
1996	Sweden	EJC18	3rd place, bronze medalist(s)	5	1	1	2	14
1997	Sweden	WJC	8th	6	1	0	1	2
1998	Sweden	WJC	6th	1	0	0	0	2
Junior totals				12	2	1	3	18

== Awards and honours ==
Award	Year
AHL
All-Star Game	2001
SM-liiga
All-Star Team	2005
