= Kim Lennhammer =

Swedish ice hockey player

- Born: July 31, 1990 (age 34); Stockholm, SWE
- Height: 6 ft 3 in (191 cm)
- Weight: 185 lb (84 kg; 13 st 3 lb)
- Position: Defence
- Shoots: Right
- SEL team: Djurgårdens IF
- Playing career: 2010–present

Kim Lennhammer (born July 31, 1990) is a professional ice hockey defenseman who currently plays for Djurgårdens IF in the Elitserien.

== Career statistics ==
			Regular season					Playoffs
Season	Team	League	GP	G	A	Pts	PIM	GP	G	A	Pts	PIM
2008–09	Djurgårdens IF	J20	41	8	3	11	32	6	0	3	3	2
2008–09	Djurgårdens IF	Elitserien	4	0	0	0	0	0	0	0	0	0
2009–10	Djurgårdens IF	J20	40	4	20	24	36	0	0	0	0	0
2009–10	Djurgårdens IF	Elitserien	2	0	0	0	0	0	0	0	0	0
2010–11	Djurgårdens IF	Elitserien	5	0	0	0	0	0	0	0	0	0
2010–11	Almtuna IS	HockeyAllsvenskan	29	1	3	4	24	6	1	2	3	4
2010–11	VIK Västerås HK	HockeyAllsvenskan	11	0	1	1	4	0	0	0	0	0
