= Tim Sandberg =

Swedish ice hockey player

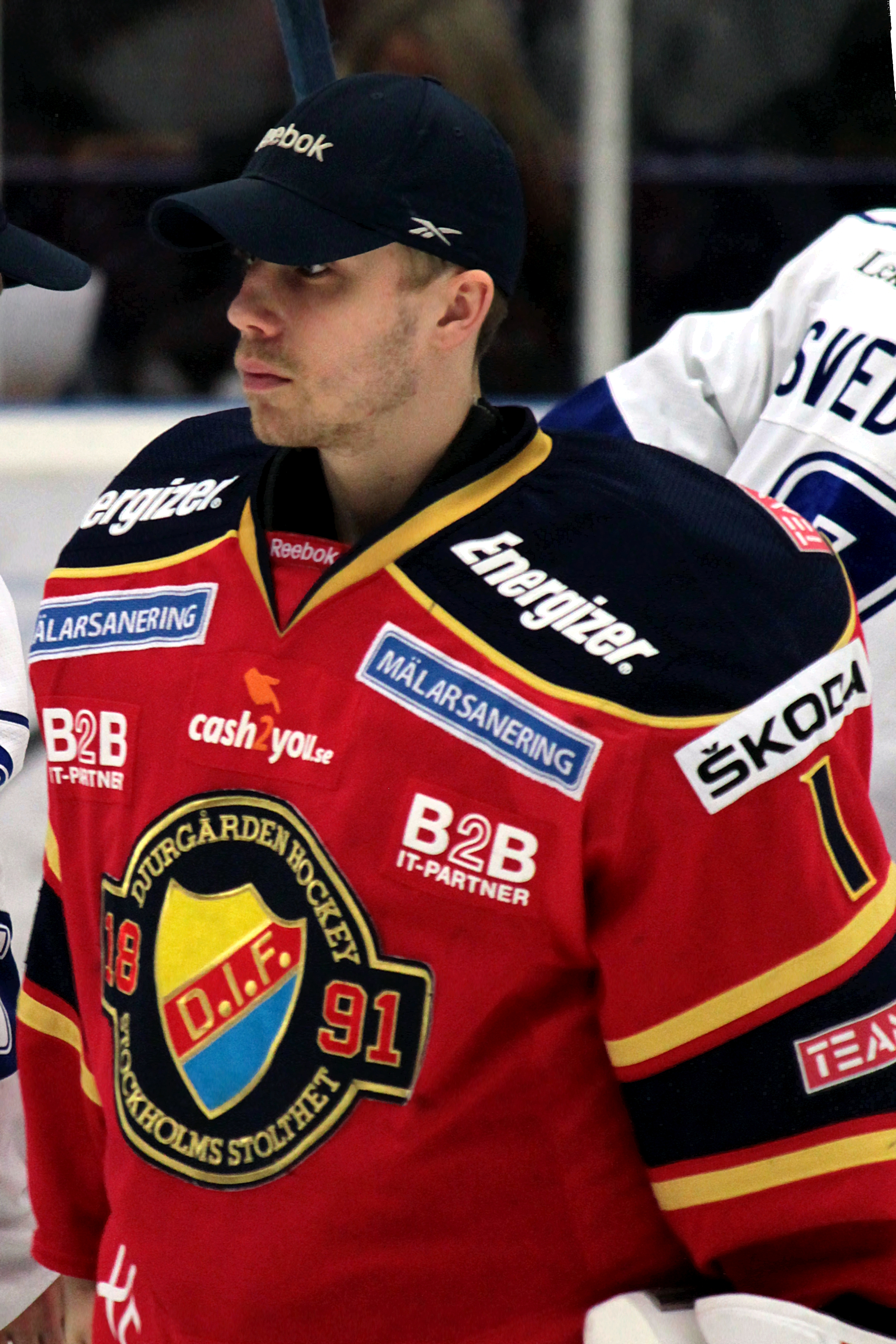
- Born: May 8, 1990 (age 36) Stockholm, Sweden
- Height: 6 ft 0 in (183 cm)
- Weight: 183 lb (83 kg; 13 st 1 lb)
- Position: Goaltender
- Catches: Left
- HockeyAllsvenskan team Former teams: Södertälje SK; Djurgårdens IF; Örebro HK
- Playing career: 2008–present

Tim Sandberg (born May 8, 1990) is a Swedish professional ice hockey goaltender. He made his debut in the Swedish Hockey League with Djurgårdens IF Hockey in 2009. He is currently playing with Södertälje SK in the HockeyAllsvenskan, the second division in Sweden.

== Early life ==
Sandberg was born in Sweden to Finnish parents who had moved to Sweden in the 1980s. He holds both Finnish and Swedish citizenship; the latter he received when he was fifteen years old.
