= Oscar Eklund =

Swedish professional ice hockey player

- Born: August 27, 1988 (age 38) Stockholm, Sweden
- Height: 6 ft 0 in (183 cm)
- Weight: 190 lb (86 kg; 13 st 8 lb)
- Position: Defence
- Shot: Left
- Played for: Djurgårdens IF; Oulun Kärpät; HIFK; Brynäs IF; KooKoo; Iserlohn Roosters; JYP Jyväskylä; HC Dynamo Pardubice; Södertälje SK
- Playing career: 2008–2023

Oscar Eklund (born August 27, 1988) is a Swedish professional ice hockey player. He is currently playing with Södertälje SK of the HockeyAllsvenskan (Allsv).

Eklund had previously played with the Oulun Kärpät in the SM-Liiga. He also has presented HIFK in Finnish Liiga.

== Career statistics ==
			Regular season					Playoffs
Season	Team	League	GP	G	A	Pts	PIM	GP	G	A	Pts	PIM
2003–04	AIK IF U16	U16 SM	3	0	0	0	4	—	—	—	—	—
2004–05	Djurgårdens IF J18	J18 Elit	22	7	4	11	12	—	—	—	—	—
2004–05	Djurgårdens IF J18	J18 Allsvenskan	9	1	3	4	8	6	1	0	1	4
2004–05	Djurgårdens IF J20	J20 SuperElit	11	0	0	0	6	—	—	—	—	—
2005–06	Djurgårdens IF J18	J18 Elit	4	1	0	1	6	—	—	—	—	—
2005–06	Djurgårdens IF J18	J18 Allsvenskan	—	—	—	—	—	3	0	0	0	4
2005–06	Djurgårdens IF J20	J20 SuperElit	37	2	3	5	20	4	0	1	1	2
2006–07	Djurgårdens IF J20	J20 SuperElit	36	6	6	12	44	7	0	3	3	6
2006–07	Djurgårdens IF	Elitserien	17	0	0	0	0	—	—	—	—	—
2007–08	Djurgårdens IF J20	J20 SuperElit	10	0	3	3	10	5	0	3	3	4
2007–08	Djurgårdens IF	Elitserien	33	0	0	0	10	5	0	0	0	0
2007–08	Nyköpings HK	HockeyAllsvenskan	11	1	0	1	8	—	—	—	—	—
2008–09	Djurgårdens IF	Elitserien	21	0	0	0	8	—	—	—	—	—
2008–09	Almtuna IS	HockeyAllsvenskan	4	0	0	0	4	—	—	—	—	—
2008–09	Huddinge IK	HockeyAllsvenskan	4	0	0	0	2	—	—	—	—	—
2009–10	Djurgårdens IF	Elitserien	53	1	3	4	32	16	1	3	4	0
2010–11	Djurgårdens IF	Elitserien	52	5	10	15	28	7	0	3	3	4
2011–12	Kärpät	SM-liiga	36	1	15	16	26	9	1	5	6	2
2012–13	Kärpät	SM-liiga	8	1	3	4	2	3	0	2	2	4
2013–14	HIFK Hockey	Liiga	45	2	8	10	10	2	0	0	0	2
2014–15	Brynäs IF	SHL	52	4	5	9	16	7	0	0	0	2
2015–16	KooKoo	Liiga	36	1	11	12	31	—	—	—	—	—
2016–17	KooKoo	Liiga	60	2	11	13	12	—	—	—	—	—
2017–18	Iserlohn Roosters	DEL	40	0	6	6	10	1	0	0	0	0
2018–19	JYP Jyväskylä	Liiga	16	1	2	3	6	—	—	—	—	—
2018–19	HC Dynamo Pardubice	Czech	20	3	3	6	8	—	—	—	—	—
2019–20	HC Dynamo Pardubice	Czech	33	0	4	4	16	—	—	—	—	—
2019–20	Mountfield HK	Czech	17	2	6	8	10	2	0	1	1	2
2020–21	Södertälje SK	HockeyAllsvenskan	36	1	7	8	26	4	1	0	1	4
2021–22	Södertälje SK	HockeyAllsvenskan	37	0	4	4	28	—	—	—	—	—
2022–23	Boo HC	Division 3	4	1	2	3	2	—	—	—	—	—
SHL/Elitserien totals			228	10	18	28	94	35	1	6	7	6
SM-liiga totals			201	8	50	58	87	14	1	7	8	8
Czech totals			70	5	13	18	34	2	0	1	1	2
