= Kristofer Ottosson =

Swedish ice hockey player

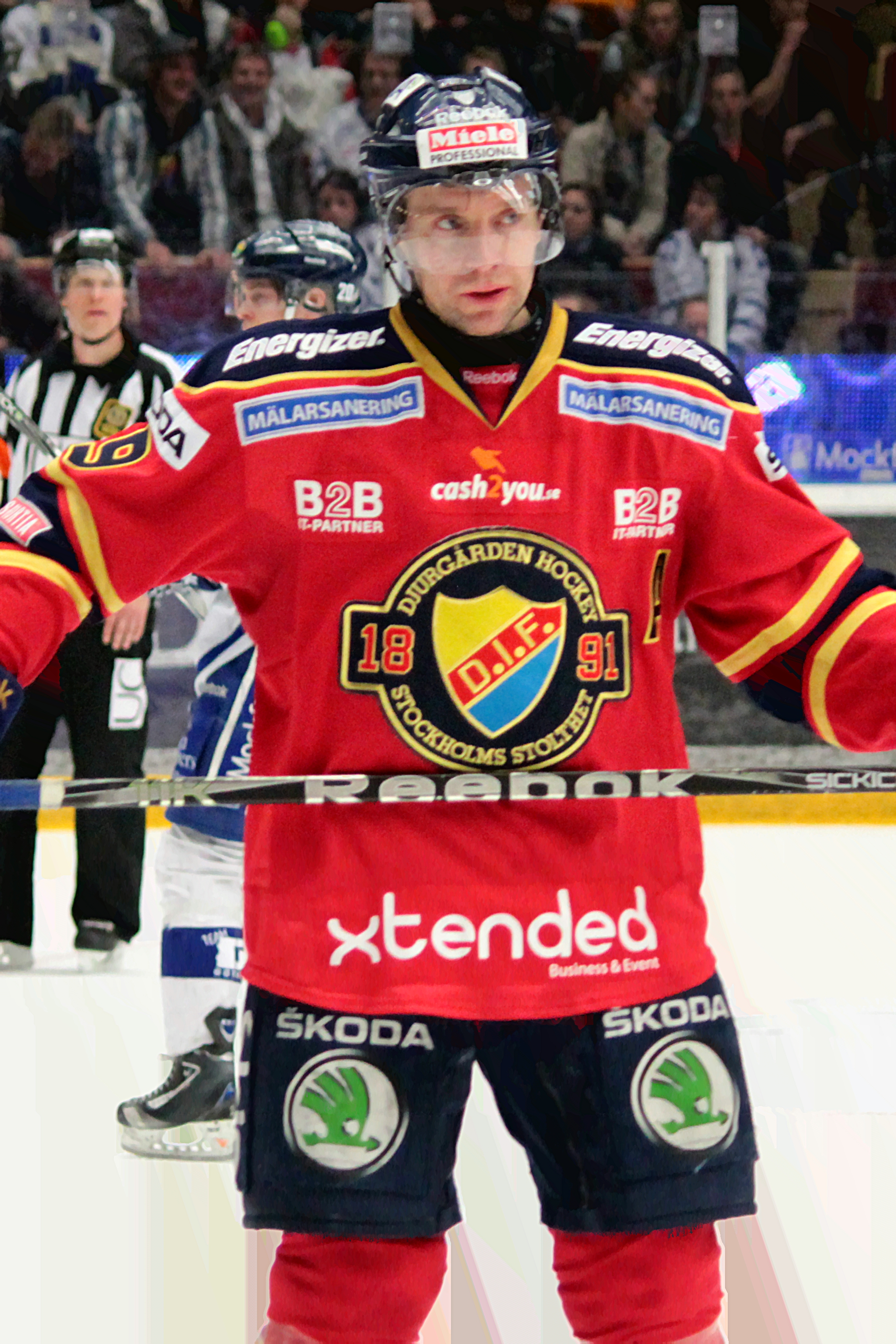
- Born: January 9, 1976 (age 49); Skarpnäck, Stockholm, SWE
- Height: 5 ft 10.5 in (179 cm)
- Weight: 186 lb (84 kg; 13 st 4 lb)
- Position: Right wing
- Shot: Left
- Played for: Djurgårdens IF; Huddinge IK
- NHL draft: 148th overall, 2000; New York Islanders
- Playing career: 1994–2013

Jan Kristofer Ottosson (born January 9, 1976) is a Swedish former professional ice hockey player. Ottosson began playing hockey in Djurgården's youth organization and was later promoted to the J20-team. He made his Elitserien debut on 22 September 1994, and has since then been a regular member of the senior team, with the exception of a two-season stint at Huddinge IK. He was also on loan to Haninge HF in the 1994–95 season and Arlanda Wings in the 1996–97 season. He took a break from hockey in 2005, missing the first 18 regular season games due to family issues. He scored his 300th regular season point in Elitserien on 5 October 2010, when he made an assist to Andreas Holmqvist's goal. After the 2012/2013 season, Ottosson announced his retirement from hockey.

== Career statistics ==
=== Regular season and playoffs ===
			Regular season					Playoffs
Season	Team	League	GP	G	A	Pts	PIM	GP	G	A	Pts	PIM
1993–94	Djurgårdens IF	SWE U20	13	3	6	9	4	—	—	—	—	—
1994–95	Djurgårdens IF	J20	15	8	23	31	2	—	—	—	—	—
1994–95	Djurgårdens IF	SEL	30	0	0	0	2	3	0	0	0	0
1995–96	Djurgårdens IF	J20	15	5	12	17	4	—	—	—	—	—
1995–96	Djurgårdens IF	SEL	32	1	0	1	2	2	0	0	0	0
1996–97	Djurgårdens IF	J20	2	1	1	2	0	—	—	—	—	—
1996–97	Djurgårdens IF	SEL	20	0	0	0	2	—	—	—	—	—
1996–97	Huddinge IK	SWE.2	15	1	4	5	2	2	0	1	1	0
1996–97	Arlanda HC	SWE.2	6	6	0	6	0	—	—	—	—	—
1997–98	Huddinge IK	SWE.2	30	17	20	37	14	—	—	—	—	—
1998–99	Huddinge IK	SWE.2	41	15	19	34	16	—	—	—	—	—
1999–2000	Djurgårdens IF	SEL	47	25	15	40	12	13	7	2	9	2
2000–01	Djurgårdens IF	SEL	46	17	24	41	14	14	7	4	11	4
2001–02	Djurgårdens IF	SEL	41	13	8	21	12	4	0	0	0	0
2002–03	Djurgårdens IF	SEL	46	19	19	38	30	12	1	4	5	0
2003–04	Djurgårdens IF	SEL	50	7	12	19	16	4	0	1	1	4
2004–05	Djurgårdens IF	SEL	34	4	9	13	8	11	1	3	4	6
2005–06	Djurgårdens IF	SEL	31	6	11	17	22	—	—	—	—	—
2006–07	Djurgårdens IF	SEL	51	12	12	24	26	—	—	—	—	—
2007–08	Djurgårdens IF	SEL	51	11	19	30	34	5	1	1	2	0
2008–09	Djurgårdens IF	SEL	47	16	11	27	12	—	—	—	—	—
2009–10	Djurgårdens IF	SEL	39	12	14	26	16	16	3	1	4	0
2010–11	Djurgårdens IF	SEL	53	6	17	23	16	7	3	0	3	0
2011–12	Djurgårdens IF	SEL	54	12	18	30	12	—	—	—	—	—
2012–13	Djurgårdens IF	Allsv	51	15	21	36	14	6	1	2	3	0
SEL totals			672	161	189	350	236	91	23	16	39	16

=== International ===
Year	Team	Event	GP	G	A	Pts	PIM
1994	Sweden	EJC	5	0	5	5	0
1995	Sweden	WJC	7	0	0	0	0
1996	Sweden	WJC	7	0	3	3	2
2001	Sweden	WC	9	4	4	8	0
Junior totals			19	0	8	8	2
Senior totals			9	4	4	8	0
