= Mika Hannula =

Swedish ice hockey player

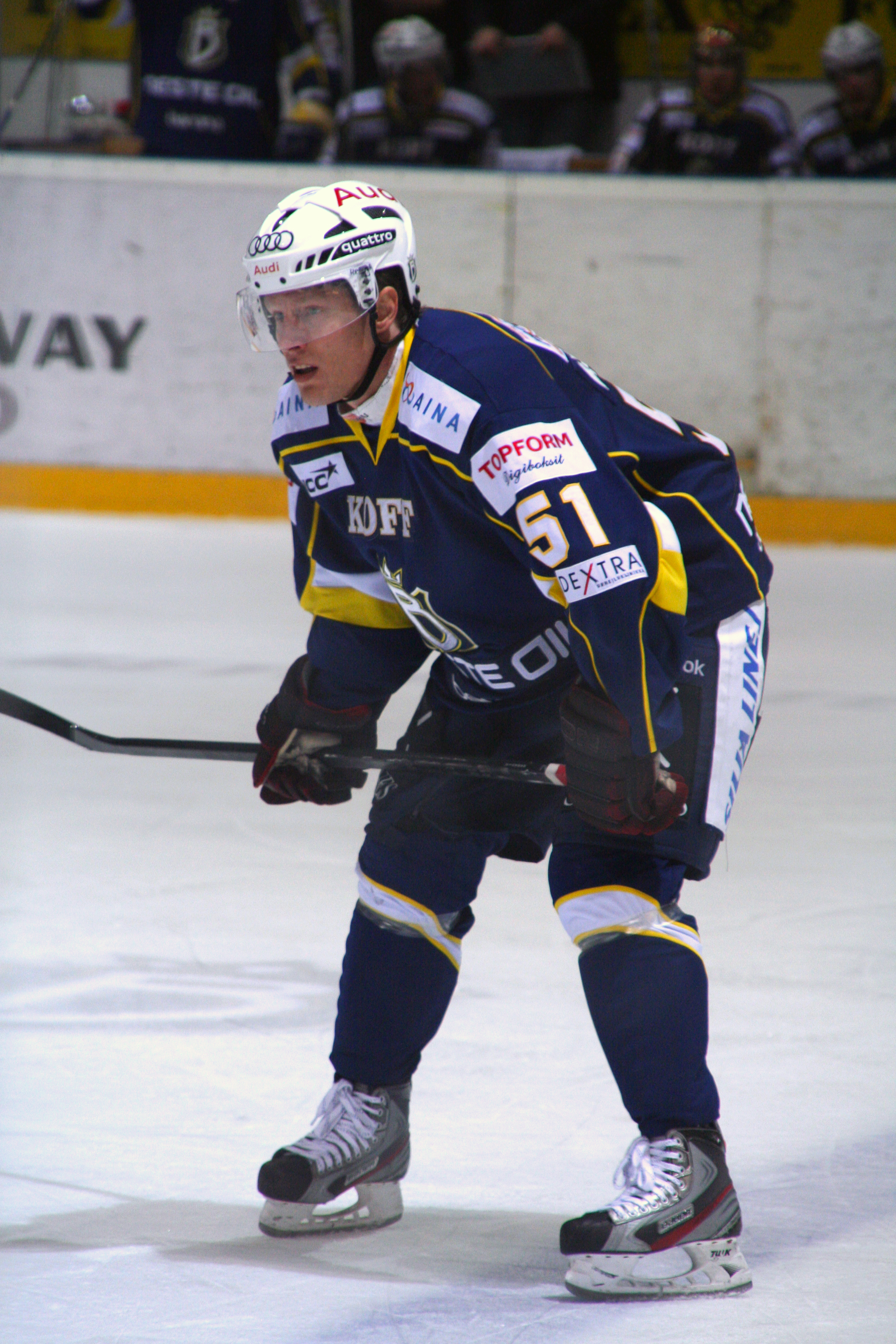
- Born: 2 April 1979 (age 47) Huddinge, Sweden
- Height: 5 ft 11 in (180 cm)
- Weight: 190 lb (86 kg; 13 st 8 lb)
- Position: Right wing
- Shot: Right
- Played for: KHL; Salavat Yulaev Ufa; Metallurg Magnitogorsk; SKA Saint Petersburg; Lokomotiv Yaroslavl; HC CSKA Moscow; AHL; Houston Aeros; SEL; Modo Hockey; Malmö Redhawks; HV71; Djurgårdens IF; Espoo Blues
- National team: Sweden
- NHL draft: 269th overall, 2002; Minnesota Wild
- Playing career: 2000–2014

Medal record

Representing Sweden

Ice hockey

Winter Olympics
Gold medal – first place	2006 Turin	

World Championships
Gold medal – first place	2006 Latvia	
Silver medal – second place	2003 Finland	

Mika Stefan Hannula (born 2 April 1979) is a Swedish former professional ice hockey player.

== Playing career ==
Hannula started playing ice hockey with Finnish team TPS.

Hannula was drafted in the 2002 NHL entry draft by Minnesota Wild with their 9th choice, 269th overall selection. During his career, he has played for three different hockey teams in the Stockholm area: AIK Hockey, Djurgårdens IF and Hammarby IF. He also tried playing in the United States for the Houston Aeros in the American Hockey League during the season 2003–04, totalling 27 points in 67 regular season games.

During the semifinal game in the 2006 World Championships in Riga, Latvia, against Canada, Hannula cross-checked the Canadian player Sidney Crosby to the neck and head area when Crosby was celebrating a goal he just had scored. Hannula was immediately suspended for the final game against Czech Republic, and later the IIHF Disciplinary Committee extended his suspension to the first four games of the 2007 World Championships in Moscow, Russia, plus a fine of 5,000 euro (approx. $6,400).

The Swedish club HV71 signed Hannula from Malmö Redhawks in April 2005, for three years. He played for the club in one season and started the 2006–07 season successfully. Although, on November 13, 2006, HV71's general manager Fredrik Stillman announced through the club's web site that Hannula will take an indefinite break from ice hockey for personal reasons. One week later, November 20, it was noted that he participated in a training session with the Stockholm-based club Vallentuna BK, where Hannula's younger brother played at the same time.

On December 1, HV71's chairman Hans-Göran Frick announced that the club let Hannula go and broke his contract, which had one year left. Hannula signed on December 19 with the Russian club Lokomotiv Yaroslavl in the Russian Super League. After his first season in RSL, scoring 15 points in 23 games, Hannula signed with SKA Saint Petersburg for one year. According to media, the contract was worth approximately 770,000 euro after tax deductions. After an unsuccessful season, scoring 14 points in 46 games, he signed with HC CSKA Moscow in June 2008.

Hannula signed a short-term contract with Djurgårdens IF in December 2009 when Djurgården temporarily lost three players, Daniel Brodin, Jacob Josefson and Marcus Krüger, to the World Junior Hockey Championship. He had previously practiced with Djurgården's J20 team before signing on for the senior team. After his stint at Djurgården he moved on to KHL team Salavat Yulaev. Hannula played a total of 13 games, scoring 3 goals and 10 points. He moved on to league rival Metallurg Magnitogorsk for the 2010–11 KHL season; however, he was able to play only one game for the team due to an injury. His contract was terminated and he spent the rest of the 2010 fall rehabilitating. Hannula signed on again for Djurgården in the beginning of January 2011, a contract that expired at the end of the 2010–11 Elitserien season.

On 30 August 2011, Hannula signed a contract of unknown duration with Modo Hockey of the Swedish Elitserien. The contract ended on 16 October, one day after a game against Luleå HF which ended 3–1 in Modo's favour. Hannula recorded two goals and one assist in that game, but after just two goals in twelve games he was not expected to stay with the team. However, on 17 October 2011, Hannula extended his contract with Modo to expire on 5 November.

On 21 November 2011, the SM-liiga team Espoo Blues announced having signed the forward for the current season.

== Off the ice ==
Hannula is of Finnish descent through his father, and he has a younger brother, Ronnie, who is also a hockey player.

== Awards ==
- Played in the Elitserien All-Star Game in 2002.
- Silver medal at the World Championships in 2003.
- Gold medal at the Winter Olympic Games in 2006.
- Gold medal at the World Championships in 2006.

== Career statistics ==
=== Regular season and playoffs ===
			Regular season					Playoffs
Season	Team	League	GP	G	A	Pts	PIM	GP	G	A	Pts	PIM
1996–97	AIK	J20	26	4	4	8	58	—	—	—	—	—
1997–98	Lukko	FIN U20	6	2	0	2	36	—	—	—	—	—
1997–98	Djurgårdens IF	J20	14	10	6	16	22	—	—	—	—	—
1998–99	Lidingö Vikings	SWE.2	32	10	0	10	47	—	—	—	—	—
1999–2000	Hammarby IF	Allsv	43	10	10	20	53	2	0	0	0	2
2000–01	MIF Redhawks	J20	1	1	1	2	0	—	—	—	—	—
2000–01	MIF Redhawks	SEL	45	2	9	11	26	8	3	2	5	14
2001–02	MIF Redhawks	SEL	41	10	7	17	14	5	2	1	3	0
2002–03	MIF Redhawks	SEL	49	15	15	30	72	—	—	—	—	—
2003–04	Houston Aeros	AHL	67	9	18	27	59	—	—	—	—	—
2004–05	Malmö Redhawks	SEL	47	14	9	23	71	—	—	—	—	—
2005–06	HV71	SEL	45	13	18	31	62	12	3	8	11	22
2006–07	HV71	SEL	18	9	6	15	64	—	—	—	—	—
2006–07	Lokomotiv Yaroslavl	RSL	23	7	8	15	32	5	0	3	3	10
2007–08	SKA Saint Petersburg	RSL	46	7	7	14	34	9	1	0	1	4
2008–09	CSKA Moscow	KHL	52	14	10	24	57	3	0	2	2	0
2009–10	Djurgårdens IF	SEL	7	3	1	4	0	—	—	—	—	—
2009–10	Salavat Yulaev Ufa	KHL	13	3	7	10	4	16	2	3	5	18
2010–11	Metallurg Magnitogorsk	KHL	1	0	0	0	0	—	—	—	—	—
2010–11	Djurgårdens IF	SEL	14	5	3	8	14	5	3	0	3	0
2011–12	MODO Hockey	SEL	20	5	9	14	8	—	—	—	—	—
2011–12	Espoo Blues	SM-l	22	4	10	14	16	16	5	7	12	10
2012–13	Espoo Blues	SM-l	13	4	1	5	6	—	—	—	—	—
2012–13	HIFK	SM-l	14	5	4	9	4	6	1	1	2	12
2013–14	Kölner Haie	DEL	6	1	0	1	4	17	1	4	5	10
SEL totals			286	76	77	153	331	30	11	11	22	36
RSL totals			69	14	15	29	66	14	1	3	4	14

=== International ===
Year	Team	Event	GP	G	A	Pts	PIM
2003	Sweden	WC	9	2	0	2	2
2006	Sweden	OG	8	0	0	0	2
2006	Sweden	WC	8	4	1	5	35
Senior totals			25	6	1	7	39
