= Arvid Strömberg =

Swedish ice hockey player

- Born: 30 June 1991 (age 33); Stockholm, Sweden
- Height: 6 ft 0 in (183 cm)
- Weight: 189 lb (86 kg; 13 st 7 lb)
- Position: Forward
- Shoots: Left
- SEL team: Djurgårdens IF
- Playing career: 2010–present

Arvid Strömberg (born 30 June 1991 in Stockholm, Sweden) is a professional Swedish ice hockey player. He is currently a forward for Djurgårdens IF in Elitserien.

== Career statistics ==
			Regular season					Playoffs
Season	Team	League	GP	G	A	Pts	PIM	GP	G	A	Pts	PIM
2008–09	Djurgårdens IF	J20	3	3	0	3	2	3	0	0	0	0
2009–10	Djurgårdens IF	J20	35	13	7	20	24	—	—	—	—	—
2009–10	Djurgårdens IF	SEL	1	0	0	0	0	—	—	—	—	—
2010–11	Djurgårdens IF	J20	38	22	17	39	30	4	1	2	3	0
2010–11	Djurgårdens IF	SEL	6	0	0	0	0	—	—	—	—	—
