= Stefan Ridderwall =

Swedish ice hockey player

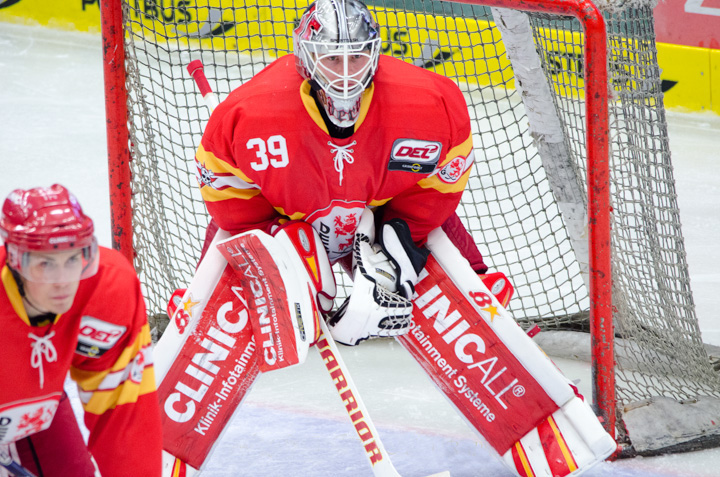
- Born: 5 March 1988 (age 38) Stockholm, Sweden
- Height: 1.88 m (6 ft 2 in)
- Weight: 91 kg (201 lb; 14 st 5 lb)
- Position: Goaltender
- Caught: Left
- Played for: Djurgårdens IF; Timrå IK; Düsseldorfer EG; Rødovre Mighty Bulls; EC Kitzbühel
- NHL draft: 173rd overall, 2006; New York Islanders
- Playing career: 2004–2020

Carl Stefan Ridderwall (born 5 March 1988) is a Swedish former professional ice hockey goaltender. He last played with EC Kitzbühel of the Alps Hockey League (AlpsHL).

== Playing career ==
He began his career in the 2003–04 season with Huddinge IK in the J18 Allsvenskan. The following season he joined league rival Djurgårdens IF. During the winter 2005, he was promoted to Djurgården's J20 team in J20 SuperElit. Ridderwall made his Elitserien debut the following season, but only played one game during the 2005–06 season. Ridderwall was drafted in the sixth round of the 2006 NHL entry draft, 173rd overall, by the New York Islanders.

Ridderwall did not play in Elitserien during the 2006–07 season, and spent the season playing in Djurgården's J20 team. The following season, Ridderwall was Djurgården's second goaltender behind Daniel Larsson, and played 11 games in Elitserien. He also spent some time on loan to Allsvenskan teams IK Nyköpings NH 90 and Almtuna IS. During the 2008–09 season, Ridderwall became the first-choice goaltender in the senior team, and played 27 games out of 55 during the regular season. For the 2009–10 season, Ridderwall shares the first-choice position with Gustaf Wesslau.

In the 2013–14 season, Ridderwall signed for his first venture abroad, agreeing to a one-year deal with Düsseldorfer EG in the Deutsche Eishockey Liga.

He is the son of former goaltender Rolf Ridderwall. Ridderwall has been awarded "goaltender of the tournament" twice on the national junior tournament TV-pucken.
