= Mathias Tjärnqvist =

Swedish ice hockey player

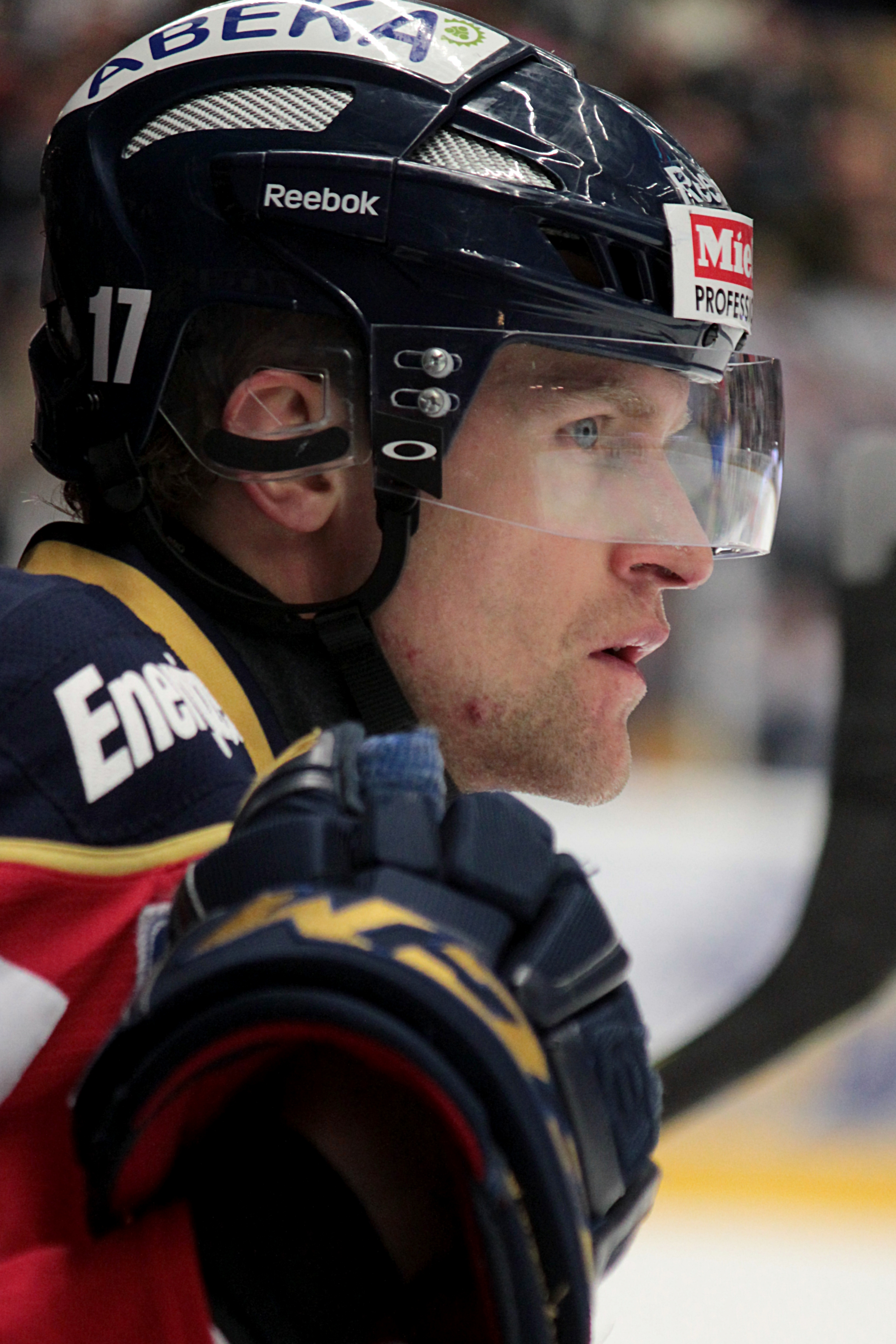
- Born: April 15, 1979 (age 47) Umeå, Sweden
- Height: 6 ft 2 in (188 cm)
- Weight: 196 lb (89 kg; 14 st 0 lb)
- Position: Right wing
- Shot: Left
- Played for: Djurgårdens IF; Dallas Stars; HV71; Phoenix Coyotes; Rögle BK; Malmö Redhawks
- NHL draft: 96th overall, 1999; Dallas Stars
- Playing career: 1997–2017

Medal record

Representing Sweden

Ice hockey

World Championships
Silver medal – second place	2003 Helsinki	
Silver medal – second place	2004 Prague	

Mathias Erik Tjärnqvist (born April 15, 1979, in Umeå, Sweden) is a Swedish former professional ice hockey forward. His older brother, Daniel Tjärnqvist, was a defenceman for Djurgårdens IF; both brothers played in the NHL. Mathias currently serves as an assistant coach for Malmö Redhawks in the SHL.

== Playing career ==
Tjärnqvist was drafted by the Dallas Stars with the 96th overall, third round pick in the 1999 NHL entry draft. During the 2004–05 NHL lockout, Tjärnqvist played with HV 71 in the Elitserien along with fellow NHL'ers Manny Malhotra, Jonathan Cheechoo, and Bryan McCabe. On February 12, 2007, he was traded to the Phoenix Coyotes, along with a first round pick in the 2007 NHL entry draft, for Ladislav Nagy. In 2017 Tjärnqvist officially announced his retirement.

== Career statistics ==
=== Regular season and playoffs ===
			Regular season					Playoffs
Season	Team	League	GP	G	A	Pts	PIM	GP	G	A	Pts	PIM
1996–97	Rögle BK	SWE-2	15	1	4	5	4	—	—	—	—	—
1997–98	Rögle BK	SWE-2	31	12	11	23	30	4	2	0	2	6
1998–99	Rögle BK	SWE-2	34	18	16	34	44	—	—	—	—	—
1999–00	Djurgårdens IF	SWE	50	12	12	24	20	13	3	2	5	16
2000–01	Djurgårdens IF	SWE	47	11	8	19	53	16	1	2	3	6
2001–02	Djurgårdens IF	SWE	6	0	1	1	2	2	0	0	0	2
2002–03	Djurgårdens IF	SWE	38	11	13	24	30	9	4	1	5	12
2003–04	Utah Grizzlies	AHL	60	15	13	28	51	—	—	—	—	—
2003–04	Dallas Stars	NHL	18	1	1	2	2	—	—	—	—	—
2004–05	HV 71	SWE	46	8	9	17	18	—	—	—	—	—
2005–06	Iowa Stars	AHL	34	17	12	29	28	1	0	0	0	0
2005–06	Dallas Stars	NHL	33	2	4	6	18	—	—	—	—	—
2006–07	Iowa Stars	AHL	2	1	1	2	0	—	—	—	—	—
2006–07	Dallas Stars	NHL	18	1	3	4	4	—	—	—	—	—
2006–07	Phoenix Coyotes	NHL	26	5	4	9	2	—	—	—	—	—
2007–08	Phoenix Coyotes	NHL	78	4	7	11	34	—	—	—	—	—
2008–09	Rögle BK	SWE	40	11	10	21	16	—	—	—	—	—
2009–10	Djurgårdens IF	SWE	18	2	2	4	8	16	1	2	3	8
2010–11	Djurgårdens IF	SWE	43	17	6	23	18	7	2	2	4	2
SWE totals			288	72	61	132	167	63	11	9	20	46
NHL totals			173	13	19	32	60	—	—	—	—	—

=== International ===
Year	Team	Comp	GP	G	A	Pts	PIM
1999	Sweden	WJC	6	1	4	5	4
2003	Sweden	WC	9	1	1	2	4
2004	Sweden	WC	9	0	0	0	4
Junior int'l totals			6	1	4	5	4
Senior int'l totals			18	1	1	2	8

== See also ==
- Notable families in the NHL
