= 2008–09 Djurgårdens IF (men's hockey) season =

Swedish ice hockey club season

2008–09 Djurgårdens IF Hockey
- League: 10th SHL
- 2008–09 record: 17–23–15

Team information
- General manager: Tommy Engström
- Coach: Mikael Johansson & Tomas Montén
- Captain: Jimmie Ölvestad
- Alternate captains: Christian Eklund; Marcus Ragnarsson
- Arena: Hovet

Team leaders
- Goals: Niklas Anger (23)
- Assists: Fredrik Bremberg (40)
- Points: Fredrik Bremberg (57)
- Penalty minutes: Jimmie Ölvestad (101)
- Plus/minus: Timmy Pettersson (+9)
- Goals against average: Gustaf Wesslau (2.49)

The 2008–09 Djurgårdens IF Hockey season will be the club's 33rd season in the Swedish elite league Elitserien. The signing of David Schneider during late July 2008 is the first American player in the club's history to play for the club. The regular season started on home ice on September 18, 2008 against Luleå HF and will be concluded on February 28, 2009 away against Frölunda HC.

== Offseason ==
March 20: Team captain Jimmie Ölvestad re-signed a one-year contract with Djurgården.

April 15: Former assistant coaches Mikael Johansson and Tomas Montén signed a two-year contract as the new coaches of the team.

== Pre-season ==
=== Nordic Trophy ===
==== Standings ====
Nordic Trophy	GP	W	L	T	OTW	OTL	PSW	PSL	GF	GA	PTS
y- (Sweden) Linköpings HC	9	7	2	0	0	0	0	0	31	19	14
y- (Sweden) Frölunda HC	9	7	2	0	0	0	0	0	25	18	14
y- (Sweden) Djurgårdens IF	9	6	3	0	0	0	0	0	33	23	12
y- (Finland) HIFK	9	4	3	2	0	0	2	0	30	26	12
x- (Finland) Kärpät	9	5	4	0	0	0	0	0	20	17	10
x- (Finland) TPS	9	3	5	1	0	0	1	0	18	29	8
x- (Sweden) Färjestads BK	9	3	5	1	0	0	0	1	22	27	7
x- (Sweden) HV71	9	3	6	0	0	0	0	0	19	25	6
z- (Finland) Jokerit	9	2	6	1	0	0	0	1	24	29	5
z- (Finland) Tappara	9	2	6	1	0	0	0	1	21	30	5

y - clinched semi-final spot for championship, x - clinched semi-final spot for 5th place, z - play for 9th place

==== Game log ====
2008 Nordic trophy game log

Group stage: 6–3–0 (Home: 4–0–0; Road: 2–3–0)
Round	Date	Opponent	Score	Goaltender	Venue	Attendance	Record	Pts
1	August 7	HIFK	2 – 3	Ridderwall	(Finland) Järvenpää	920	0–1–0	0
2	August 8	Tappara	2 – 4	Wesslau	(Finland) Tampere	2,357	0–2–0	0
3	August 10	TPS	6 – 2	Ridderwall	(Finland) Paimio	355	1–2–0	3
4	August 14	Linköping	1 – 4	Wesslau	Electroluxhallen	1,200	1–3–0	3
5	August 21	Kärpät	5 – 2	Ridderwall	Hovet	680	2–3–0	6
6	August 22	Jokerit	4 – 2	Wesslau	Hovet	625	3–3–0	9
7	August 24	HV71	2 – 1	Wesslau	Kinnarps Arena	4,700	4–3–0	12
8	August 26	Frölunda	6 – 2	Wesslau	Vallentuna Ishall	1,619	5–3–0	15
9	August 29	Färjestad	5 – 3	Wesslau	(Norway) Jordal Amfi	2,172	6–3–0	18

Playoffs
Round	Date	Opponent	Score	Goaltender	Venue	Attendance
Semifinal	September 5	Frölunda	2 – 3 (pen.)	Wesslau	Cloetta Center	1,926
Bronze Final	September 6	HIFK	2 – 3 (pen.)	Ridderwall	Cloetta Center	1,098

Legend: Win (3 points) Overtime win (2 point) Loss (0 points) Overtime loss (1 point)

==== Statistics ====
No	Pos	Nat	Player	GP	G	A	Pts	PIM
#1	Forward	(Sweden) SWE	Dick Axelsson	9	3	6	9	26
#2	Defence	(Sweden) SWE	Timmy Pettersson	8	2	7	9	4
#3	Forward	(Sweden) SWE	Jimmie Ölvestad	8	3	5	8	20
#4	Center	(Sweden) SWE	Michael Holmqvist	9	3	4	7	26
#5	C/D	(Sweden) SWE	Nichlas Falk	9	1	6	7	2
#6	Center	(Sweden) SWE	Andreas Engqvist	9	3	2	5	4
#7	Forward	(Sweden) SWE	Tim Eriksson	9	3	2	5	0
#8	Forward	(Sweden) SWE	Niklas Anger	9	2	3	5	2
#9	Forward	(Sweden) SWE	Nicklas Danielsson	8	0	5	5	12
#10	Center	(Sweden) SWE	Kristofer Ottosson	7	4	0	4	2

==== Goaltenders ====
No	Nat	Player	GPI	MIP	SOG	GA	GAA	SVS%
#1	(Sweden) SWE	Gustaf Wesslau	6	358:00	192	16	2.68	91.67%
#2	(Sweden) SWE	Stefan Ridderwall	3	179:22	79	7	2.34	91.14%

=== Friendly games ===
==== Game log ====
Exhibition games game log

Exhibition games: 0–2–0 (Home: 0–1–0; Road: 0–1–0)
Date	Opponent	Score	Goaltender	Venue	Attendance
September 2	Malmö	0–3	Owuya	Hovet	596
September 12	Södertälje	2–4	Ridderwall	Lundahallen	600

Legend: Win Loss Tie

== Regular season ==
=== Standings ===
Elitserien	GP	W	L	T	OTW	OTL	GF	GA	Pts
y – Färjestads BK	55	30	17	4	1	3	158	122	99
x – Linköpings HC	55	26	16	8	1	4	166	152	92
x – Frölunda HC	55	25	20	2	6	2	144	130	91
x – HV71	55	22	13	9	4	7	160	144	90
x – Luleå HF	55	26	20	3	0	6	149	136	87
x – Skellefteå AIK	55	21	22	3	5	4	149	141	80
x – Brynäs IF	55	21	22	6	4	2	128	140	79
x – Timrå IK	55	19	24	4	7	1	152	142	76
e – Modo Hockey	55	20	27	2	4	2	153	177	72
e – Djurgårdens IF	55	17	23	8	5	2	149	155	71
r – Rögle BK	55	18	25	4	1	7	152	178	67
r – Södertälje SK	55	12	28	7	5	3	122	165	56

x – clinched playoff spot; y – clinched regular season league title; e – eliminated from playoff contention; r – play in relegation series

=== Game log ===
2008–09 Game log

September: 2–2–1 (Home: 1–1–1; Road: 1–1–0)
Round	Date	Opponent	Score	Goaltender	Venue	Attendance	Record	Pts	Recap
1	September 18	Luleå	2 – 1	Ridderwall	Hovet	6,748	1–0–0	3
2	September 23	Brynäs	4 – 1	Ridderwall	Läkerol Arena	5,211	2–0–0	6
3	September 25	Färjestad	2 – 5	Wesslau	Hovet	6,093	2–1–0	6
4	September 27	Modo	3 – 6	Ridderwall	Swedbank Arena	7,021	2–2–0	6
5	September 30	Skellefteå	3 – 2	Ridderwall	Hovet	5,113	2–2–1	8

October: 3–4–6 (Home: 2–2–1; Road: 1–2–5)
Round	Date	Opponent	Score	Goaltender	Venue	Attendance	Record	Pts	Recap
6	October 2	Linköping	2 – 3	Ridderwall	Cloetta Center	6,778	2–2–2	9
7	October 4	HV71	2 – 3	Wesslau	Kinnarps Arena	6,908	2–3–2	9
8	October 7	Timrå	2 – 1	Ridderwall	Hovet	5,828	3–3–2	12
9	October 9	Rögle	3 – 3	Ridderwall	Lindab Arena	4,973	3–3–3	13
10	October 11	Frölunda	1 – 5	Ridderwall	Hovet	6,055	3–4–3	13
11	October 13	Södertälje	4 – 2	Ridderwall	AXA Sports Center	4,611	4–4–3	16
12	October 16	Rögle	2 – 1	Ridderwall	Hovet	4,679	4–4–4	18
13	October 18	Linköping	3 – 1	Wesslau	Hovet	5,657	5–4–4	21
14	October 21	HV71	2 – 2	Ridderwall	Kinnarps Arena	6,987	5–4–5	22
15	October 23	Luleå	5 – 4	Ridderwall	Coop Arena	5,501	5–4–6	24
16	October 25	Timrå	2 – 3	Ridderwall	E.ON Arena	5,373	5–4–7	25
17	October 28	Södertälje	3 – 5	Ridderwall	Hovet	7,483	5–5–7	25
18	October 30	Färjestad	1 – 2	Wesslau	Löfbergs Lila Arena	7,652	5–6–7	25

November: 2–7–1 (Home: 2–4–0; Road: 0–3–1)
Round	Date	Opponent	Score	Goaltender	Venue	Attendance	Record	Pts	Recap
19	November 1	Frölunda	3 – 6	Wesslau	Hovet	6,345	5–7–7	25
20	November 3	Modo	3 – 4	Ridderwall	Swedbank Arena	5,444	5–8–7	25
21	November 11	Modo	7 – 0	Wesslau	Hovet	5,793	6–8–7	28
22	November 15	Skellefteå	2 – 2	Ridderwall	Skellefteå Kraft Arena	5,636	6–8–8	29
23	November 18	Brynäs	2 – 4	Ridderwall	Hovet	7,131	6–9–8	29
24	November 20	Frölunda	1 – 4	Wesslau	Hovet	4,227	6–10–8	29
25	November 22	Rögle	3 – 4	Ridderwall	Lindab Arena	4,675	6–11–8	29
26	November 24	Timrå	4 – 2	Ridderwall	Hovet	3,319	7–11–8	32
27	November 27	Södertälje	1 – 4	Wesslau	AXA Sports Center	3,926	7–12–8	32
28	November 29	HV71	1 – 5	Wesslau	Hovet	6,092	7–13–8	32

December: 2–2–4 (Home: 2–1–2; Road: 0–1–2)
Round	Date	Opponent	Score	Goaltender	Venue	Attendance	Record	Pts	Recap
29	December 2	Linköping	3 – 3	Wesslau	Cloetta Center	6,978	7–13–9	33
30	December 4	Skellefteå	0 – 2	Wesslau	Hovet	3,930	7–14–9	33
31	December 6	Färjestad	3 – 2	Wesslau	Hovet	5,092	8–14–9	36
32	December 11	Luleå	3 – 2	Wesslau	Hovet	3,936	8–14–10	38
33	December 13	Brynäs	3 – 3	Wesslau	Läkerol Arena	7,465	8–14–11	39
34	December 26	Rögle	3 – 1	Wesslau	Hovet	7,032	9–14–11	42
35	December 28	Färjestad	1 – 4	Wesslau	Löfbergs Lila Arena	8,073	9–15–11	42
36	December 30	Södertälje	3 – 3	Ridderwall	Hovet	6,525	9–15–12	43

January: 6–4–1 (Home: 3–2–0; Road: 3–2–1)
Round	Date	Opponent	Score	Goaltender	Venue	Attendance	Record	Pts	Recap
37	January 3	HV71	1 – 2	Ridderwall	Hovet	8,092	9–16–12	43
38	January 5	Luleå	6 – 2	Ridderwall	Coop Arena	4,599	10–16–12	46
39	January 10	Timrå	2 – 4	Ridderwall	E.ON Arena	5,307	10–17–12	46
40	January 12	Linköping	5 – 1	Ridderwall	Hovet	4,573	11–17–12	49
41	January 15	Skellefteå	2 – 1	Wesslau	Skellefteå Kraft Arena	4,491	12–17–12	52
42	January 17	Modo	5 – 3	Wesslau	Hovet	7,549	13–17–12	55
43	January 22	Frölunda	2 – 1	Wesslau	Scandinavium	10,850	14–17–12	58
44	January 24	Brynäs	2 – 1	Wesslau	Hovet	8,094	15–17–12	61
45	January 26	Linköping	1 – 2	Wesslau	Cloetta Center	7,029	15–18–12	61
46	January 29	Rögle	4 – 3	Wesslau	Lindab Arena	4,845	15–18–13	63
47	January 31	HV71	3 – 5	Wesslau	Hovet	8,094	15–19–13	63

February: 2–4–2 (Home: 2–1–1; Road: 0–3–1)
Round	Date	Opponent	Score	Goaltender	Venue	Attendance	Record	Pts	Recap
48	February 12	Luleå	5 – 2	Wesslau	Hovet	6,834	16–19–13	66
49	February 14	Modo	4 – 4	Wesslau	Swedbank Arena	7,600	16–19–14	67
50	February 17	Timrå	4 – 1	Wesslau	Hovet	6,622	17–19–14	70
51	February 19	Färjestad	3 – 4	Wesslau	Hovet	8,094	17–20–14	70
52	February 21	Brynäs	2 – 4	Wesslau	Läkerol Arena	8,166	17–21–14	70
53	February 24	Skellefteå	2 – 2	Wesslau	Hovet	7,559	17–21–15	71
54	February 26	Södertälje	1 – 3	Wesslau	AXA Sports Center	4,049	17–22–15	71
55	February 28	Frölunda	3 – 5	Ridderwall	Scandinavium	11,795	17–23–15	71

=== Stats ===
==== Skaters Top-10 ====
from stats.swehockey

No	Pos	Nat	Player	GP	G	A	Pts	PIM	+/–
#1	Forward	(Sweden) SWE	Fredrik Bremberg	53	17	40	57	26	-8
#2	Forward	(Sweden) SWE	Niklas Anger	51	23	19	42	16	+5
#3	Defence	(Sweden) SWE	Marcus Ragnarsson	49	12	25	37	38	-12
#4	Center	(Sweden) SWE	Kristofer Ottosson	47	16	11	27	12	+8
#5	Center	(Sweden) SWE	Nichlas Falk	53	2	23	25	20	+4
#6	Forward	(Sweden) SWE	Nicklas Danielsson	50	7	14	21	69	-6
#7	Center	(Sweden) SWE	Michael Holmqvist	53	9	10	19	78	-19
#8	Forward	(Sweden) SWE	Tim Eriksson	54	4	15	19	22	-15
#9	Defence	(United States) USA	David Schneider	41	7	11	18	42	-4
#10	Center	(Sweden) SWE	Andreas Engqvist	31	9	7	16	12	+1

==== Goaltenders ====
No	Nat	Player	GP	GPI	MIP	SOG	GA	GAA	SVS%
#1	(Sweden) SWE	Tim Sandberg	3	1	16:42	7	0	0.00	100.00%
#2	(Sweden) SWE	Gustaf Wesslau	53	33	1857:20	899	77	2.49	91.43%
#3	(Sweden) SWE	Stefan Ridderwall	38	27	1469:34	692	71	2.90	89,74%
#4	(Sweden) SWE	Mark Owuya	16	0	0:00	0	0	0.00	0.00%

== Transfers ==
Acquired by Djurgårdens IF
Player	Former team	Contract Terms
G (Sweden) Gustaf Wesslau	(Sweden) Borås HC	2 years
D (Sweden) Alexander Deilert	(Sweden) DIF J-20	2 years
D (Sweden) Niklas Andersson	(Sweden) Växjö Lakers	2 years
D (Sweden) Marcus Ragnarsson	(Sweden) Almtuna IS	1 year
F (Sweden) Henrik Eriksson	(Sweden) DIF J-20	2 years
F (Sweden) Tim Eriksson	(Sweden) Linköpings HC	2 years
F (Sweden) Robin Figren	(Canada) Edmonton Oil Kings	Loan
F (Sweden) Michael Holmqvist	(Sweden) Frölunda HC	2 years
F (Sweden) Jacob Josefson	(Sweden) DIF J-20	2 years
D (United States) David Schneider	(United States) Norfolk Admirals	6 months
D (Finland) Tero Konttinen	(Finland) TPS	1,5 month
D (Sweden) Andreas Holmqvist	(Sweden) Frölunda HC	End of season
F (Sweden) Marcus Kristoffersson	(Sweden) Malmö Redhawks	2 games

Leaving Djurgårdens IF
Player	New team
F (Sweden) M Kristoffersson	(Italy) SG Cortina
F (Sweden) Dick Axelsson	(Sweden) Färjestad BK
G (Sweden) Daniel Larsson	(United States) Detroit Red Wings
D (Sweden) Thomas Johansson	Retired
D (Sweden) Dennis Persson	(Sweden) Timrå IK
D (Czech Republic) Jiří Marusak	(Czech Republic) HC Mlada Boleslav
D (Finland) Ossi Väänänen	(United States) Philadelphia Flyers
F (Sweden) Johan Ryno	(Sweden) AIK
F (Sweden) Pär Bäcker	(Denmark) AaB Aalborg
F (Sweden) Patric Hörnqvist	(United States) Nashville Predators

== Drafted players ==
Djurgården players picked at the 2009 NHL entry draft.

Round	Pick	Player	Nationality	NHL team
1st	20th	Jacob Josefson	Sweden	New Jersey Devils
3rd	73rd	Alexander Urbom	Sweden	New Jersey Devils
5th	149th	Marcus Krüger	Sweden	Chicago Blackhawks
