= 2007–08 Djurgårdens IF (men's hockey) season =

Swedish ice hockey club season

2007–08 Djurgårdens IF Hockey
- League: 7th SHL
- 2007–08 record: 21-14-20
- Home record: 12-6-9
- Road record: 9-8-11
- Goals for: 145
- Goals against: 139

Team information
- General manager: (Sweden) Tommy Engström
- Coach: (Sweden) Hans Särkijärvi
- Captain: (Sweden) Jimmie Ölvestad
- Alternate captains: (Sweden) Thomas Johansson
- Arena: Hovet & Globen
- Average attendance: 6623

Team leaders
- Goals: (Sweden) Patric Hörnqvist (18)
- Assists: (Sweden) Fredrik Bremberg (34)
- Points: (Sweden) Fredrik Bremberg (45)
- Penalty minutes: (Sweden) Jimmie Ölvestad (111)
- Plus/minus: (Sweden) Timmy Pettersson (+17)
- Goals against average: (Sweden) Daniel Larsson (2.29)

The 2007-2008 Djurgårdens IF Hockey season began on September 25, 2007, with a match against defending champions Modo Hockey. After failing to qualify for the playo-offs for two seasons, Djurgårdens finished 7th and played silver medalist Linköpings HC in the quarter-final, but lost 1-4 in matches.

Goaltender Daniel Larsson won the Honken Trophy as best goaltender and was named "Rookie of the Year".

== Standings ==
Elitserien	GP	W	L	T	OTW	OTL	GF	GA	Pts
y – HV71	55	31	13	11	3	4	178	132	107
x – Linköpings HC	55	21	14	20	9	4	166	153	92
x – Modo Hockey	55	26	22	7	5	1	153	150	90
x – Färjestads BK	55	25	19	11	3	3	169	147	89
x – Timrå IK	55	23	23	9	5	2	134	136	83
x – Frölunda HC	55	23	22	10	3	4	159	157	82
x – Djurgårdens IF Hockey	55	21	20	14	2	2	145	139	79
x – Skellefteå AIK	55	19	20	16	2	6	135	141	75
e – Södertälje SK	55	18	24	13	2	4	123	129	69
e – Luleå HF	55	17	25	13	2	6	139	164	66
r – Mora IK	55	17	25	13	2	4	133	160	66
r – Brynäs IF	55	16	30	9	4	2	152	178	61

x – clinched playoff spot; y – clinched regular season league title; e – eliminated from playoff contention; r – played in regulation series

== Game log ==
2007–08 Game Log

September: 0–1–2 (Home: 0–0–1; Road: 4–0–1)
#	Date	Home	Score	Visitor	OT	Decision	Attendance	Record	Pts	Position
1	September 25	Modo Hockey	5 – 4	Djurgården		Larsson	6, 968	0–0–1	0	11th
2	September 27	Djurgården	1 – 4	Färjestads BK		Larsson	6, 453	0–0–2	0	11th
3	September 29	HV71	4 – 4	Djurgården		Larsson	6,920	0–1–2	1	11th

October: 7–2–3 (Home: 3–2–2; Road: 4–0–1)
#	Date	Home	Score	Visitor	OT	Decision	Attendance	Record	Pts	Position
4	October 1	Djurgården	4 – 0	Skellefteå AIK		Larsson	4, 732	1–1–2	4	10th
5	October 4	Djurgården	6 – 0	Frölunda HC		Larsson	4, 127	2–1–2	7	5th
6	October 6	Mora IK	3 – 0	Djurgården		Larsson	3, 852	2–1–3	7	10th
7	October 9	Djurgården	0 – 2	Timrå IK		Larsson	6, 232	2–1–4	7	10th
8	October 11	Brynäs IF	1 – 2	Djurgården		Ridderwall	5, 211	3–1–4	10	8th
9	October 18	Djurgården	6 – 1	Luleå Hockey		Larsson	5, 669	4–1–4	13	8th
10	October 15	Linköpings HC	0 – 4	Djurgården		Larsson	7, 387	5–1–4	16	5th
11	October 20	Djurgården	1 – 1	Södertälje SK		Larsson	6, 410	5–2–4	17	5th
12	October 22	Södertälje SK	1 – 2	Djurgården		Ridderwall	4, 999	6–2–4	20	3rd
13	October 25	Djurgården	1 – 3	Linköpings HC		Larsson	6, 244	6–2–5	20	5th
14	October 27	Luleå Hockey	2 – 3	Djurgården		Larsson	4, 782	7–2–5	23	4th
15	October 30	Djurgården	1 – 1	Brynäs IF		Larsson	8, 091	7–3–5	24	5th

== Roster ==
Goaltenders
Number		Player	Catches	Acquired	Place of Birth
1	(Sweden)	Daniel Larsson	L	2006	Boden, Sweden
30	(Sweden)	Mark Owuya	L	2007	Stockholm, Sweden
39	(Sweden)	Stefan Ridderwall	L	2004	Brännkyrka, Sweden

Defensemen
Number		Player	Shoots	Acquired	Place of Birth
4	(Finland)	Ossi Väänänen	L	2007	Helsinki, Finland
6	(Sweden)	Ronnie Pettersson	L	1996	Sweden
8	(Sweden)	Dennis Persson	L	2006	Nyköping, Sweden
15	(Czech Republic)	Jiří Marusak	R	2005	Czech Republic
18	(Sweden)	Thomas Johansson - A	L	2006	Stockholm, Sweden
33	(Sweden)	Timmy Pettersson	L	2006	Gislaved, Sweden
36	(Sweden)	Edvin Frylén	L	2007	Järfälla, Sweden
38	(Sweden)	Fredrik Ericson	L	2006	Stockholm, Sweden

Forwards
Number		Player	Position	Shoots	Acquired	Place of Birth
9	(Sweden)	Kristofer Ottosson	C	L	1998	Skarpnäck, Sweden
10	(Sweden)	Patric Hörnqvist	RW	R	2005	Sollentuna, Sweden
14	(Sweden)	Dick Axelsson	LW	L	2007	Stockholm, Sweden
16	(Sweden)	Nichlas Falk	C	L	1995	Stockholm, Sweden
17	(Sweden)	Niklas Anger	RW	L	2006	Täby, Sweden
19	(Sweden)	Jimmie Ölvestad - C	LW	L	2004	Stockholm, Sweden
20	(Sweden)	Christian Eklund	RW	L	2006	Haninge, Sweden
21	(Sweden)	Andreas Engqvist	C	R	2005	Spånga, Sweden
23	(Sweden)	Fredrik Bremberg	LW	L	2002	Stockholm, Sweden
24	(Sweden)	Pär Bäcker	C	L	2006	Grums, Sweden
26	(Norway)	Morten Ask	C	L	2006	Oslo, Norway
44	(Sweden)	Nicklas Danielsson	RW	R	2006	Uppsala, Sweden
