= 2010–11 Montreal Canadiens season =

NHL hockey team season

2010–11 Montreal Canadiens
- Division: 2nd Northeast
- Conference: 6th Eastern
- 2010–11 record: 44–30–8
- Home record: 24–11–6
- Road record: 20–19–2
- Goals for: 216
- Goals against: 209

Team information
- General manager: Pierre Gauthier
- Coach: Jacques Martin
- Captain: Brian Gionta
- Alternate captains: Hal Gill; Andrei Markov
- Arena: Bell Centre
- Average attendance: 21,273 (100.0%)

Team leaders
- Goals: Brian Gionta (29)
- Assists: Tomas Plekanec (35)
- Points: Tomas Plekanec (57)
- Penalty minutes: P. K. Subban (124)
- Plus/minus: Jaroslav Spacek (+9)
- Wins: Carey Price (38)
- Goals against average: Carey Price (2.35)

The 2010–11 Montreal Canadiens season was the franchise's 102nd overall season and its 94th since joining the National Hockey League (NHL). The Canadiens finished sixth in the Eastern Conference and 14th in the NHL overall before losing in seven games to the eventual Stanley Cup champions, the third-seeded Boston Bruins, in the Eastern Conference Quarterfinals of the 2011 Stanley Cup playoffs.

== Off-season ==
On September 29, 2010, the Canadiens named forward Brian Gionta team captain.

== Regular season ==
The Canadiens opened their season with a road game against long-time rival Toronto Maple Leafs on October 7. The home opener was on October 13 against the Tampa Bay Lightning.

The Canadiens were the most penalized team in the league with 327 power-play opportunities against.

== Standings ==
=== Divisional standings ===
Northeast Division
		GP	W	L	OTL	ROW	GF	GA	Pts
**1**	**y – Boston Bruins**	**82**	**46**	**25**	**11**	**44**	**246**	**195**	**103**
**2**	**Montreal Canadiens**	**82**	**44**	**30**	**8**	**41**	**216**	**209**	**96**
**3**	**Buffalo Sabres**	**82**	**43**	**29**	**10**	**38**	**245**	**229**	**96**
4	Toronto Maple Leafs	82	37	34	11	32	218	251	85
5	Ottawa Senators	82	32	40	10	30	192	250	74

=== Conference standings ===
Eastern Conference
R		Div	GP	W	L	OTL	ROW	GF	GA	Pts
**1**	**z – Washington Capitals**	**SE**	**82**	**48**	**23**	**11**	**43**	**224**	**197**	107
**2**	**y – Philadelphia Flyers**	**AT**	**82**	**47**	**23**	**12**	**44**	**259**	**223**	106
**3**	**y – Boston Bruins**	**NE**	**82**	**46**	**25**	**11**	**44**	**246**	**195**	103
**4**	**Pittsburgh Penguins**	**AT**	**82**	**49**	**25**	**8**	**39**	**238**	**199**	106
**5**	**Tampa Bay Lightning**	**SE**	**82**	**46**	**25**	**11**	**40**	**247**	**240**	103
**6**	**Montreal Canadiens**	**NE**	**82**	**44**	**30**	**8**	**41**	**216**	**209**	96
**7**	**Buffalo Sabres**	**NE**	**82**	**43**	**29**	**10**	**38**	**245**	**229**	96
**8**	**New York Rangers**	**AT**	**82**	**44**	**33**	**5**	**35**	**233**	**198**	93
8.5
9	Carolina Hurricanes	SE	82	40	31	11	35	236	239	91
10	Toronto Maple Leafs	NE	82	37	34	11	32	218	251	85
11	New Jersey Devils	AT	82	38	39	5	35	174	209	81
12	Atlanta Thrashers	SE	82	34	36	12	29	223	269	80
13	Ottawa Senators	NE	82	32	40	10	30	192	250	74
14	New York Islanders	AT	82	30	39	13	26	229	264	73
15	Florida Panthers	SE	82	30	40	12	26	195	229	72

bold – qualified for playoffs; y – Won division; z – Placed first in conference (and division)
AT – Atlantic Division, NE – Northeast Division, SE – Southeast Division

== Schedule and results ==
=== Pre-season ===
2010 Pre-season

#	Date	Visitor	Score	Home	OT	Decision	Record	Recap
1	September 22	Boston Bruins	4–2	Montreal Canadiens		Price, Sanford	0–1–0	
2	September 24	Ottawa Senators	2–4	Montreal Canadiens		Mayer	1–1–0	
3	September 25	Montreal Canadiens	2–6	Ottawa Senators		Price	1–2–0	
4	September 26	Minnesota Wild	3–4	Montreal Canadiens		Auld	2–2–0	
5	September 27	Florida Panthers	2–6	Montreal Canadiens		Price	3–2–0	
6	September 30	Buffalo Sabres	5–3	Montreal Canadiens		Auld	3–3–0	
7	October 2 (in Quebec City, QC)	Montreal Canadiens	7–2	New York Islanders (SS)		Price	4–3–0	
(SS) = Split-squad games.

=== Regular season ===
2010–11 Game Log
October: 7–3–1, 15 Points (home: 3–2–1; road: 4–1–0)

Game	Date	Opponent	Score	Decision	Location	Attendance	Record	Points	Recap
1	October 7	Toronto Maple Leafs	2–3	Price	Air Canada Centre	19,646	0–1–0	0	
2	October 9	Pittsburgh Penguins	3–2	Price	Consol Energy Center	18,106	1–1–0	2	
3	October 13	Tampa Bay Lightning	3–4 OT	Price	Bell Centre	21,273	1–1–1	3	
4	October 15	Buffalo Sabres	2–1	Price	HSBC Arena	17,264	2–1–1	5	
5	October 16	Ottawa Senators	4–3	Price	Bell Centre	21,273	3–1–1	7	
6	October 21	New Jersey Devils	0–3	Price	Bell Centre	21,273	3–2–1	7	
7	October 23	Ottawa Senators	3–0	Price	Scotiabank Place	20,301	4–2–1	9	
8	October 25	Phoenix Coyotes	3–2 OT	Price	Bell Centre	21,273	5–2–1	11	
9	October 27	New York Islanders	5–3	Price	Bell Centre	21,273	6–2–1	13	
10	October 29	New York Islanders	3–1	Auld	Nassau Coliseum	11,922	7–2–1	15	
11	October 30	Florida Panthers	1–3	Price	Bell Centre	21,273	7–3–1	15	

November: 8–5–0, 16 Points (home: 6–2–0; road: 2–3–0)
Season: 15–8–1 (home: 9–4–1; road: 6–4–0)

Game	Date	Opponent	Score	Decision	Location	Attendance	Record	Points	Recap
12	November 2	Columbus Blue Jackets	0–3	Price	Nationwide Arena	18,500	7–4–1	15	
13	November 5	Buffalo Sabres	3–2	Price	HSBC Arena	18,026	8–4–1	17	
14	November 6	Ottawa Senators	2–3	Price	Bell Centre	21,273	8–5–1	17	
15	November 9	Vancouver Canucks	2–0	Price	Bell Centre	21,273	9–5–1	19	
16	November 11	Boston Bruins	3–1	Price	TD Garden	17,565	10–5–1	21	
17	November 13	Carolina Hurricanes	7–2	Price	Bell Centre	21,273	11–5–1	23	
18	November 16	Philadelphia Flyers	3–0	Price	Bell Centre	21,273	12–5–1	25	
19	November 18	Nashville Predators	0–3	Price	Bell Centre	21,273	12–6–1	25	
20	November 20	Toronto Maple Leafs	2–0	Price	Bell Centre	21,273	13–6–1	27	
21	November 22	Philadelphia Flyers	2–3	Price	Wachovia Center	19,753	13–7–1	27	
22	November 24	Los Angeles Kings	4–1	Price	Bell Centre	21,273	14–7–1	29	
23	November 26	Atlanta Thrashers	0–3	Auld	Philips Arena	13,068	14–8–1	29	
24	November 27	Buffalo Sabres	3–1	Price	Bell Centre	21,273	15–8–1	31	

December: 6–8–1, 13 Points (home: 3–1–1; road: 3–7–0)
Season: 21–16–2 (home: 12–5–2; road: 9–11–0)

Game	Date	Opponent	Score	Decision	Location	Attendance	Record	Points	Recap
25	December 1	Edmonton Oilers	3–4 OT	Price	Bell Centre	21,273	15–8–2	32	
26	December 2	New Jersey Devils	5–1	Price	Prudential Center	11,434	16–8–2	34	
27	December 4	San Jose Sharks	3–1	Price	Bell Centre	21,273	17–8–2	36	
28	December 7	Ottawa Senators	4–1	Price	Bell Centre	21,273	18–8–2	38	
29	December 10	Detroit Red Wings	2–4	Price	Joe Louis Arena	20,066	18–9–2	38	
30	December 11	Toronto Maple Leafs	1–3	Auld	Air Canada Centre	19,656	18–10–2	38	
31	December 15	Philadelphia Flyers	3–5	Price	Bell Centre	21,273	18–11–2	38	
32	December 16	Boston Bruins	4–3	Price	Bell Centre	21,273	19–11–2	40	
33	December 19	Colorado Avalanche	2–3	Price	Pepsi Center	18,007	19–12–2	40	
34	December 21	Dallas Stars	2–5	Price	American Airlines Center	17,805	19–13–2	40	
35	December 23	Carolina Hurricanes	3–2	Price	RBC Center	16,981	20–13–2	42	
36	December 26	New York Islanders	1–4	Price	Nassau Coliseum	3,136	20–14–2	42	
37	December 28	Washington Capitals	0–3	Price	Verizon Center	18,398	20–15–2	42	
38	December 30	Tampa Bay Lightning	1–4	Price	St. Pete Times Forum	20,191	20–16–2	42	
39	December 31	Florida Panthers	3–2 OT	Auld	BankAtlantic Center	20,072	21–16–2	44	

January: 6–2–3, 15 Points (home: 4–1–2; road: 2–1–1)
Season: 27–18–5 (home: 16–6–4; road: 11–12–1)

Game	Date	Opponent	Score	Decision	Location	Attendance	Record	Points	Recap
40	January 2	Atlanta Thrashers	3–4 OT	Price	Bell Centre	21,273	21–16–3	45	
41	January 6	Pittsburgh Penguins	2–1 SO	Price	Bell Centre	21,273	22–16–3	47	
42	January 8	Boston Bruins	3–2 OT	Price	Bell Centre	21,273	23–16–3	49	
43	January 11	New York Rangers	2–1	Auld	Madison Square Garden	18,200	24–16–3	51	
44	January 12	Pittsburgh Penguins	2–5	Price	Bell Centre	21,273	24–17–3	51	
45	January 15	New York Rangers	3–2	Price	Bell Centre	21,273	25–17–3	53	
46	January 17	Calgary Flames	5–4 OT	Price	Bell Centre	21,273	26–17–3	55	
47	January 18	Buffalo Sabres	1–2 OT	Price	HSBC Arena	18,225	26–17–4	56	
48	January 21	Ottawa Senators	7–1	Price	Scotiabank Place	20,337	27–17–4	58	
49	January 22	Anaheim Ducks	3–4 SO	Price	Bell Centre	21,273	27–17–5	59	
50	January 25	Philadelphia Flyers	2–5	Price	Wells Fargo Center	19,878	27–18–5	59	

February: 6–5–2, 14 Points (home: 4–2–2; road: 2–3–0)
Season: 33–23–7 (home: 20–8–6; road: 13–15–1)

Game	Date	Opponent	Score	Decision	Location	Attendance	Record	Points	Recap
51	February 1	Washington Capitals	3–2 SO	Price	Verizon Center	18,398	28–18–5	61	
52	February 2	Florida Panthers	3–2	Auld	Bell Centre	21,273	29–18–5	63	
53	February 5	New York Rangers	2–0	Price	Bell Centre	21,273	30–18–5	65	
54	February 6	New Jersey Devils	1–4	Price	Bell Centre	21,273	30–19–5	65	
55	February 9	Boston Bruins	6–8	Price	TD Garden	17,565	30–20–5	65	
56	February 10	New York Islanders	3–4 SO	Auld	Bell Centre	21,273	30–20–6	66	
57	February 12	Toronto Maple Leafs	3–0	Price	Bell Centre	21,273	31–20–6	68	
58	February 15	Buffalo Sabres	2–3 SO	Price	Bell Centre	21,273	31–20–7	69	
59	February 17	Edmonton Oilers	1–4	Price	Rexall Place	16,839	31–21–7	69	
60	February 20	Calgary Flames	0–4	Price	McMahon Stadium	41,022	31–22–7	69	
61	February 22	Vancouver Canucks	3–2	Price	Rogers Arena	18,860	32–22–7	71	
62	February 24	Toronto Maple Leafs	4–5	Price	Bell Centre	21,273	32–23–7	71	
63	February 26	Carolina Hurricanes	4–3	Auld	Bell Centre	21,273	33–23–7	73	

March: 8–7–0, 16 Points (home: 3–3–0; road: 5–4–0)
Season: 41–30–7 (home: 23–11–6; road: 18–19–1)

Game	Date	Opponent	Score	Decision	Location	Attendance	Record	Points	Recap
64	March 1	Atlanta Thrashers	3–1	Price	Philips Arena	11,156	34–23–7	75	
65	March 3	Florida Panthers	4–0	Price	BankAtlantic Center	19,722	35–23–7	77	
66	March 5	Tampa Bay Lightning	4–2	Price	St. Pete Times Forum	20,274	36–23–7	79	
67	March 8	Boston Bruins	4–1	Price	Bell Centre	21,273	37–23–7	81	
68	March 10	St. Louis Blues	1–4	Price	Scottrade Center	19,150	37–24–7	81	
69	March 12	Pittsburgh Penguins	3–0	Price	Consol Energy Center	18,087	38–24–7	83	
70	March 15	Washington Capitals	2–4	Price	Bell Centre	21,273	38–25–7	83	
71	March 17	Tampa Bay Lightning	3–2 SO	Price	Bell Centre	21,273	39–25–7	85	
72	March 18	New York Rangers	3–6	Price	Madison Square Garden	18,200	39–26–7	85	
73	March 20	Minnesota Wild	8–1	Auld	Xcel Energy Center	18,595	40–26–7	87	
74	March 22	Buffalo Sabres	0–2	Price	Bell Centre	21,273	40–27–7	87	
75	March 24	Boston Bruins	0–7	Price	TD Garden	17,565	40–28–7	87	
76	March 26	Washington Capitals	0–2	Price	Bell Centre	21,273	40–29–7	87	
77	March 29	Atlanta Thrashers	3–1	Price	Bell Centre	21,273	41–29–7	89	
78	March 30	Carolina Hurricanes	2–6	Price	RBC Center	18,701	41–30–7	89	

April: 3–0–1, 7 Points (home: 1–0–0; road: 2–0–1)
Season: 44–30–8 (home: 24–11–6; road: 20–19–2)

Game	Date	Opponent	Score	Decision	Location	Attendance	Record	Points	Recap
79	April 2	New Jersey Devils	3–1	Price	Prudential Center	17,625	42–30–7	91	
80	April 5	Chicago Blackhawks	2–1 OT	Price	Bell Centre	21,273	43–30–7	93	
81	April 7	Ottawa Senators	2–3 OT	Auld	Scotiabank Place	19,809	43–30–8	94	
82	April 9	Toronto Maple Leafs	4–1	Price	Air Canada Centre	19,676	44–30–8	96	

Legend:

Win Loss Overtime/shootout loss

== Playoffs ==
On April 5, 2011, the Canadiens qualified for the 2011 Stanley Cup playoffs with a 2–1 overtime victory against the Chicago Blackhawks. On April 9, 2011, it was determined that the Canadiens would play the Boston Bruins in the first round of the playoffs.

The Boston Bruins entered the playoffs as the third seed in the Eastern Conference after winning the Northeast Division with 103 points. The Montreal Canadiens earned the sixth seed with 96 points, winning the tiebreaker over Buffalo in regulation + overtime wins (41 to 38). One of the greatest rivalries in North American professional sports, this was the 33rd meeting of these teams in the postseason, which is the most frequent playoff series in NHL history. Montreal had a record of 24–8 against Boston in the 32 previous series played by the franchises, winning 18 straight between 1946 and 1987. Boston had only beaten Montreal en route to winning the championship once before, in 1929. The most recent meeting of these teams in the postseason was in the 2009 Eastern Conference quarterfinals, which ended with Boston sweeping Montreal.

In this series, the Boston Bruins dropped their first two games at home, but came back to hang on to a game three victory in Montreal. In game four, Andrei Kostitsyn gave the Montreal Canadiens a 3–1 lead, which they couldn't take advantage of, falling 5–4 on an overtime goal by former Montreal Canadien Michael Ryder. In game five, Boston's Ryder made a miraculous glove save while teammate and goaltender Tim Thomas was out of position, and the contest went into double overtime for Nathan Horton to win it 2–1 for Boston. In game six, Montreal scored twice on 5-on-3 power plays and won it 2–1. Game seven was also forced into overtime, where Nathan Horton again won the game 4–3 and sent the Bruins to the second round of the playoffs. Boston became the first team to win a seven-game post-season series despite being held scoreless on the power play.

On April 10, the scheduled date of the French-language Canadian federal election debate between party leaders was changed from April 14 to April 13 so it would not conflict with game one of the series. Games six and seven were played back-to-back due to a Lady Gaga concert, held on April 25 at the Bell Centre, and the requirement that the first round of the playoffs end by April 27.

This was Montreal's first Game 7 loss since 1994, also against the Bruins, and their last to date.

2011 Stanley Cup Playoffs
Eastern Conference Quarter-finals: vs. (3) Boston Bruins – Boston wins series 4–3

#	Date	Visitor	Score	Home	OT	Decision	Attendance	Series	Recap
1	April 14	Montreal Canadiens	2–0	Boston Bruins		Price	17,565	Canadiens lead 1–0	
2	April 16	Montreal Canadiens	3–1	Boston Bruins		Price	17,565	Canadiens lead 2–0	
3	April 18	Boston Bruins	4–2	Montreal Canadiens		Price	21,273	Canadiens lead 2–1	
4	April 21	Boston Bruins	5–4	Montreal Canadiens	1OT	Price	21,273	Series tied 2–2	
5	April 23	Montreal Canadiens	1–2	Boston Bruins	2OT	Price	17,565	Bruins lead 3–2	
6	April 26	Boston Bruins	1–2	Montreal Canadiens		Price	21,273	Series tied 3–3	
7	April 27	Montreal Canadiens	3–4	Boston Bruins	OT	Price	17,565	Bruins win 4–3	

Legend:

Win Loss

== Player statistics ==
=== Skaters ===
Note: GP = Games played; G = Goals; A = Assists; Pts = Points; +/− = Plus/minus; PIM = Penalty minutes

Regular season

Player	GP	G	A	Pts	+/−	PIM
Tomas Plekanec	77	22	35	57	8	60
Michael Cammalleri	67	19	28	47	2	33
Brian Gionta	82	29	17	46	3	24
Andrei Kostitsyn	81	20	25	45	3	36
P. K. Subban	77	14	24	38	−8	124
Scott Gomez	80	7	31	38	−15	48
Roman Hamrlik	79	5	29	34	6	81
Benoit Pouliot	79	13	17	30	2	87
James Wisniewski^{†}	43	7	23	30	4	20
Mathieu Darche	59	12	14	26	7	10
Jeff Halpern	72	11	15	26	6	29
Max Pacioretty	37	14	10	24	−1	39
David Desharnais	43	8	14	22	−3	12
Lars Eller	77	7	10	17	−4	48
Travis Moen	79	6	10	16	−4	96
Jaroslav Spacek	59	1	15	16	9	45
Yannick Weber	41	1	10	11	0	14
Hal Gill	75	2	7	9	−9	43
Alexandre Picard	43	3	5	8	0	17
Maxim Lapierre^{‡}	38	5	3	8	−7	63
Tom Pyatt	61	2	5	7	−1	9
Josh Gorges	36	1	6	7	−3	18
Ryan White	27	2	3	5	5	38
Paul Mara^{†}	20	0	4	4	2	48
Andrei Markov	7	1	2	3	2	4
Dustin Boyd	10	1	0	1	−6	2
Brent Sopel^{†}	12	0	0	0	−1	0
Andreas Engqvist	3	0	0	0	0	0
Aaron Palushaj	3	0	0	0	1	2
Ryan O'Byrne^{‡}	3	0	0	0	0	4
Nigel Dawes^{†}	4	0	0	0	0	0
Brendon Nash	2	0	0	0	−1	0

Playoffs

Player	GP	G	A	Pts	+/−	PIM
Michael Cammalleri	7	3	7	10	−5	0
Brian Gionta	7	3	2	5	−6	0
Tomas Plekanec	7	2	3	5	−1	2
Scott Gomez	7	0	4	4	−6	2
P. K. Subban	7	2	2	4	−2	2
Roman Hamrlik	7	0	3	3	−1	6
Mathieu Darche	7	1	1	2	−1	0
James Wisniewski	6	0	2	2	−3	7
Andrei Kostitsyn	6	2	0	2	0	6
Yannick Weber	3	2	0	2	1	0
Lars Eller	7	0	2	2	1	4
Brent Sopel	7	1	0	1	−2	2
Jeff Halpern	4	1	0	1	−1	0
Travis Moen	7	0	1	1	−1	2
David Desharnais	5	0	1	1	0	2
Hal Gill	7	0	0	0	−1	2
Paul Mara	1	0	0	0	0	0
Jaroslav Spacek	7	0	0	0	−3	4
Benoit Pouliot	3	0	0	0	0	7
Tom Pyatt	7	0	0	0	0	0
Ryan White	7	0	0	0	0	2

=== Goaltenders ===
Note: GP = Games played; TOI = Time on ice (minutes); W = Wins; L = Losses; OT = Overtime losses; GA = Goals against; GAA= Goals against average; SA= Shots against; SV= Saves; Sv% = Save percentage; SO= Shutouts

Regular season

Player	GP	TOI	W	L	OT	GA	GAA	SA	Sv%	SO	G	A	PIM
Carey Price	72	4206	38	28	6	165	2.35	2147	.923	8	0	2	13
Alex Auld	16	749	6	2	2	33	2.64	383	.914	0	0	1	2

Playoffs

Player	GP	TOI	W	L	GA	GAA	SA	Sv%	SO	G	A	PIM
Carey Price	7	455	3	4	16	2.11	242	.934	1	0	0	0

^{†}Denotes player spent time with another team before joining Canadiens. Stats reflect time with Canadiens only.
^{‡}Traded mid-season. Stats reflect time with Canadiens only.

== Suspensions/fines ==
Player	Explanation	Length	Salary	Date issued	Ref
Michael Cammalleri	Slashing Islanders forward Nino Niederreiter	1 game	$32,258.06	October 4, 2010	

== Awards and records ==
=== Milestones ===
Regular season
Player	Milestone	Reached
Tomas Plekanec	400th Career NHL Game	October 23, 2010
Lars Eller	1st Career NHL Assist	October 25, 2010
Alexandre Picard	200th Career NHL Game	October 25, 2010
Scott Gomez	800th Career NHL Game	November 11, 2010
P. K. Subban	1st Career NHL Regular Season Goal	November 11, 2010
Jaroslav Spacek	800th Career NHL Game	December 1, 2010
Roman Hamrlik	600th Career NHL Point	December 1, 2010
James Wisniewski	100th Career NHL Assist	January 2, 2011
David Desharnais	1st Career NHL Goal	January 12, 2011
Max Pacioretty	100th Career NHL Game	January 12, 2011
Andreas Engqvist	1st Career NHL Game	January 21, 2011
James Wisniewski	300th Career NHL Game	February 1, 2011
Brian Gionta	200th Career NHL Goal	February 9, 2011
Yannick Weber	1st Career NHL Goal	February 9, 2011
Andrei Kostitsyn	300th Career NHL Game	February 10, 2011
Travis Moen	500th Career NHL Game	February 15, 2011
Brendon Nash	1st Career NHL Game	February 15, 2011
Tomas Plekanec	300th Career NHL Point	February 15, 2011
Scott Gomez	500th Career NHL Assist	February 22, 2011
Brian Gionta	600th Career NHL Game	March 5, 2011
Michael Cammalleri	200th Career NHL Assist	March 8, 2011
Roman Hamrlik	1,300th Career NHL Game	March 17, 2011
Aaron Palushaj	1st Career NHL Game	March 17, 2011
P. K. Subban	1st Career NHL Hat-trick	March 20, 2011
Ryan White	1st Career NHL Goal	March 20, 2011
Carey Price	200th Career NHL Game	March 24, 2011
Jeff Halpern	200th Career NHL Assist	March 29, 2011
Brian Gionta	400th Career NHL Point	April 2, 2011
Tom Pyatt	100th Career NHL Game	April 7, 2011

Playoffs
Player	Milestone	Reached
David Desharnais	1st Career NHL Playoff Game	April 14, 2011
Lars Eller	1st Career NHL Playoff Game	April 14, 2011
Ryan White	1st Career NHL Playoff Game	April 14, 2011
Mathieu Darche	1st Career NHL Playoff Goal	April 16, 2011
Lars Eller	1st Career NHL Playoff Assist; 1st Career NHL Playoff Point	April 16, 2011
Hal Gill	100th Career NHL Playoff Game	April 16, 2011
David Desharnais	1st Career NHL Playoff Assist; 1st Career NHL Playoff Point	April 21, 2011

=== Awards ===
Regular season
Player	Award	Date
Carey Price	NHL First Star of the Week	November 15, 2010
Carey Price	NHL Second Star of the Month	November 2010
Carey Price	NHL Third Star of the Week	March 7, 2011
P. K. Subban	NHL Third Star of the Week	March 21, 2011

== Transactions ==
The Canadiens have been involved in the following transactions during the 2010–11 season.

=== Trades ===
Date	Details	
June 17, 2010	To St. Louis Blues Jaroslav Halak	To Montreal Canadiens Lars Eller; Ian Schultz
June 25, 2010	To Phoenix Coyotes 1st-round pick (27th overall) in 2010; 2nd-round pick in 2010	To Montreal Canadiens 1st-round pick (22nd overall) in 2010; 4th-round pick in 2010
June 29, 2010	To Nashville Predators Sergei Kostitsyn; Future considerations	To Montreal Canadiens Dan Ellis; Dustin Boyd; Future considerations
August 16, 2010	To Tampa Bay Lightning Cedrick Desjardins	To Montreal Canadiens Karri Ramo
November 11, 2010	To Colorado Avalanche Ryan O'Byrne	To Montreal Canadiens Michael Bournival
December 28, 2010	To New York Islanders 2nd-round pick in 2011; Conditional 5th-round pick in 2012 (Note: Condition not satisfied.)	To Montreal Canadiens James Wisniewski
December 31, 2010	To Anaheim Ducks Maxim Lapierre	To Montreal Canadiens Brett Festerling; 5th-round pick in 2012
February 17, 2011	To Anaheim Ducks 5th-round pick in 2012	To Montreal Canadiens Paul Mara
February 24, 2011	To Atlanta Thrashers Ben Maxwell; 4th-round pick in 2011	To Montreal Canadiens Nigel Dawes; Brent Sopel
February 28, 2011	To Atlanta Thrashers Brett Festerling	To Montreal Canadiens Drew MacIntyre

=== Free agents acquired ===
Player	Former team	Contract terms
Kyle Klubertanz	Djurgardens IF	1 year, entry-level, $550,000
Alex Auld	New York Rangers	1 year, $1 million
Alexandre Picard	Carolina Hurricanes	1 year, $600,000
Jeff Halpern	Los Angeles Kings	1 year, $600,000
Alain Berger	Oshawa Generals	3 years, $1.998 million entry-level contract

=== Free agents lost ===
Player	New team	Contract terms
Dan Ellis	Tampa Bay Lightning	2 years, $3 million
Shawn Belle	Edmonton Oilers	1 year, $650,000
Gregory Stewart	Edmonton Oilers	1 year, $550,000
Dominic Moore	Tampa Bay Lightning	2 years, $2.2 million
Glen Metropolit	EV Zug	2 years
Brock Trotter	Dinamo Riga	2 years
Paul Mara	Montreal Canadiens	1 year, $750,000
Marc-Andre Bergeron	Tampa Bay Lightning	1 year, $1 million

=== Lost via retirement ===
Player
Georges Laraque

=== Player signings ===
Player	Contract terms
Mathieu Darche	1 year, $575,000
Tomas Plekanec	6 years, $30 million
Tom Pyatt	1 year, $500,000
Benoit Pouliot	1 year, $1.375 million
Curtis Sanford	1 year, $550,000
Frederic St-Denis	1 year, two-way, $550,000
Dustin Boyd	1 year, $650,000
Mathieu Carle	1 year, two-way, $660,000
Maxim Lapierre	1 year, $900,000
J. T. Wyman	1 year, two-way, $550,000
David Desharnais	1 year, two-way, $575,000
Alexander Avtsin	3 years, $1.82 million entry-level contract
Cedrick Desjardins	1 year, two-way, $550,000
Ryan Russell	1 year, two-way, $550,000
Alex Henry	2 years, two-way, $1.025 million
Louis Leblanc	3 years, $2.7 million entry-level contract
Carey Price	2 years, $5.5 million
Joe Stejskal	2 years, $1.16 million entry-level contract

== Draft picks ==
Montreal's picks at the 2010 NHL entry draft in Los Angeles, California.

Round	#	Player	Position	Nationality	College/junior/club team (league)
1	22 (from Phoenix)	Jarred Tinordi	D	United States	U.S. National Team Development Program (USHL)
4	113 (from Buffalo via Phoenix)	Mark MacMillan	F	Canada	Alberni Valley Bulldogs (BCHL)
4	117	Morgan Ellis	D	Canada	Cape Breton Screaming Eagles (QMJHL)
5	147	Brendan Gallagher	RW	Canada	Vancouver Giants (WHL)
7	207	John Westin	LW	Sweden	Modo Hockey Jr. (J20 SuperElit)

== Farm teams ==
=== Hamilton Bulldogs ===
The Hamilton Bulldogs remain Montreal's top affiliate in the American Hockey League in 2010–11.

=== Wheeling Nailers ===
Montreal signed an affiliation agreement with the Wheeling Nailers of the ECHL for 2010–11, succeeding the Cincinnati Cyclones.

== Broadcasting ==
Country	Broadcaster
Canada	English: CBC, TSN, NHL Network; French: RDS, RIS.
United States	Versus, ESPN, NBC, CBS, Fox, HDNet, NHL Network.
Europe	NASN, NHL Network.
Russia	NTV (Russia).
Japan; South Korea; Thailand	ASN.

== See also ==
- 2010–11 NHL season
