= Nashoba Regional High School =

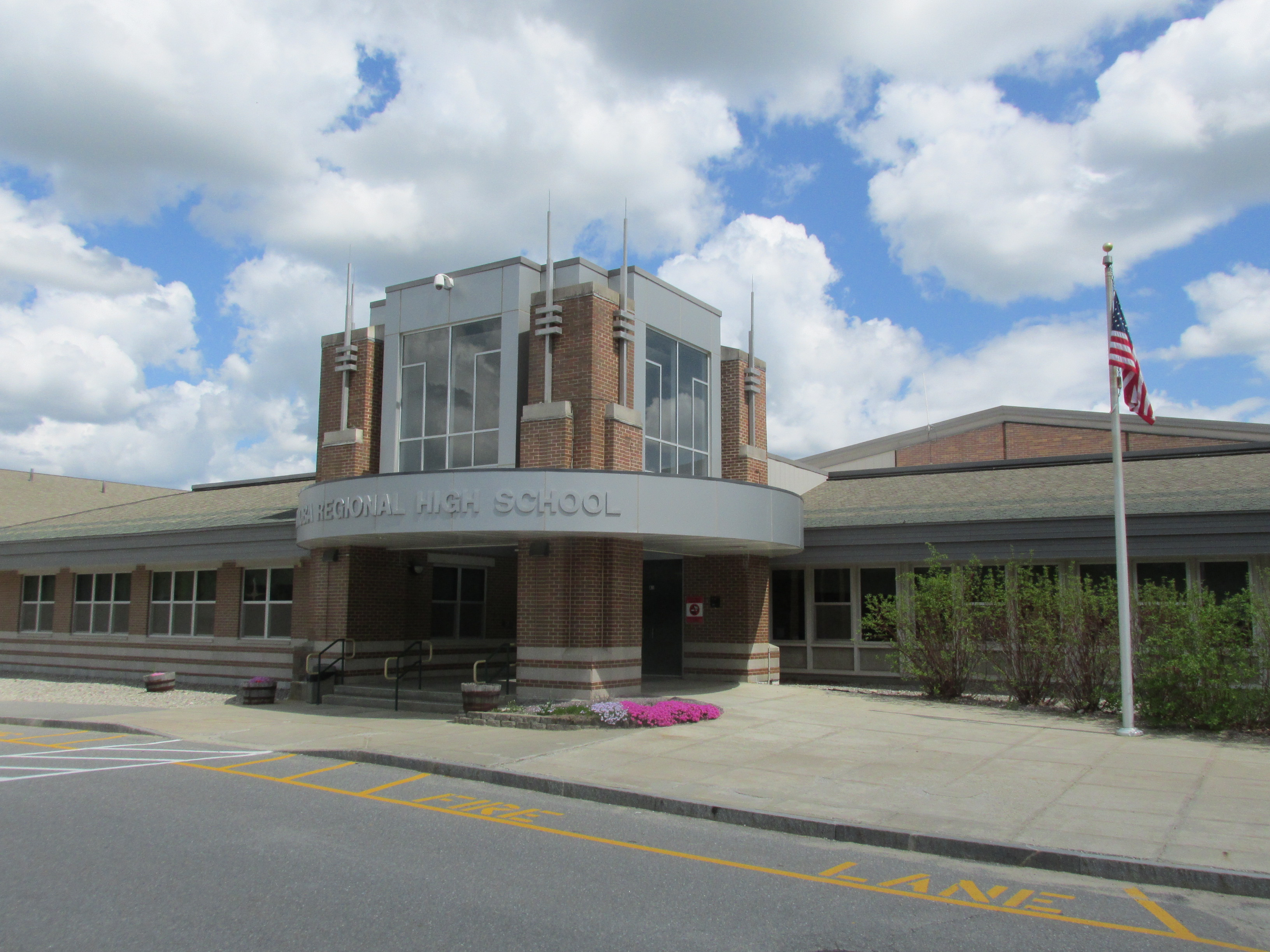

Location
- 12 Green Road; Bolton, MA 01740; United States; 42°27′02.96″N 71°37′56.04″W

Information
- School type: Public
- Established: 1961
- School district: Nashoba Regional
- Superintendent: Kirk Downing
- Principal: Kathleen Boynton
- Staff: 65.0 (FTE)
- Grades: 9–12
- Enrollment: 806 (2024–2025)
- Student to teacher ratio: 12.9
- Language: English
- Campus type: Closed
- Colors: Green; Gold
- Athletics conference: Midland Wachusett League
- Mascot: Wolves
- Rival: Clinton High School
- Communities served: Bolton, Lancaster, Stow
- Website: http://nrhs.nrsd.net/

Nashoba Regional High School (NRHS) is a high school (grades 9–12) that is part of the Nashoba Regional School District. It is located in Bolton, Massachusetts, United States and also serves the towns of Lancaster and Stow. As of the 2024–2025 school year, it had a student population of 806.

The district is currently building a new school, set to open in fall 2027.

== History ==
The high school was built in 1961, originally only being one-story high (contained a daylight basement or a lower floor below the main level, which is used as classrooms and is technically another floor). From 1972-1974, an expansion was commenced to accommodate the population growth of the cities it served. A gymnasium was dedicated, a library, as well as a two-story addition. From 2000-2002, a major renovations and additions gave the 39-year old aging building a facelift. The gymnasium was renovated and expanded, a new secure front entrance, with new administration offices, and the addition of new auditorium. The original auditorium was repurposed.

Additionally, the school is a filming site of notable alumni Chris Fleming, a comedian and actor who used Nashoba Regional High School as the setting of “Northbread High School” in his YouTube series, Gayle (2012-2015).

In 2019, a math teacher was charged with possessing child pornography, among other charges. This led to then-principal Paul DiDomenico first going on administrative leave in 2019 and then resigning in 2020, after the teacher pleaded guilty and was fired.

Between June 14, 2021, and July 13, 2021, the school was used as a filming site for the SHOWTIME TV show, Dexter.

== Academics ==
- 70% of Nashoba students take at least one Advanced Placement (A.P.) exam as of 2023.
- NRHS is home to a Concord Area Special Education (CASE) program of vocational education for students with substantial special needs (ages 15–22).
- The school also offers the unique NRHS Cadet EMT Program, which trains high school students and allows them to serve as EMTs with the Bolton Ambulance Squad. Students involved in the program carry pagers in their classes, and are given the opportunity to gain real-world experience in Emergency Medical Services. It is one of only a handful of programs like it in the United States.

== Languages ==
- NRHS offers instruction in French, German, and Spanish.
- Students learning German are invited to take part in a German exchange through Nashoba's German American Partnership Program (GAPP). Since 2009, this biennial exchange has been available to students interested in a two-week homestay and exchange experience with Nashoba’s partner school, the Gymnasium Weilheim in Weilheim, Bavaria.

== Mascot ==
The NRHS mascot was formerly the Chieftain. On July 1, 2020, the Nashoba Regional School Committee voted unanimously to retire the mascot and remove any Native American iconography from NRHS. A vote was held for the new mascot and the Wolves won with 84% of the vote. The decision was finalized in April, 2021.

== Notable alumni ==
- Harold Brown Jr., CIA Officer and U.S. Army Reserve Major who was killed during the Camp Chapman attack
- Chris Fleming, comedian and star of YouTube web series Gayle
- Hal Gill, National Hockey League player with the Nashville Predators
- Clive Weeden, professional basketball player
- Koren Zailckas, author of bestselling book Smashed
