= Ronnie Pettersson =

Swedish ice hockey player (born 1971)

- Born: March 6, 1971 (age 54) Vantör, SWE
- Height: 6 ft 3 in (191 cm)
- Weight: 209 lb (95 kg; 14 st 13 lb)
- Position: Defence
- Shot: Left
- Played for: Djurgårdens IF (SEL)
- Playing career: 1996–2009

This is about the ice hockey player. For the racing driver, see Ronnie Peterson.

Ronnie Pettersson (born March 6, 1971) is a retired Swedish professional ice hockey player. Pettersson mostly played with Djurgårdens IF in the Swedish Elitserien and Huddinge IK in the lower divisions.

== Career statistics ==
			Regular Season					Playoffs
Season	Team	League	GP	G	A	Pts	PIM	GP	G	A	Pts	PIM
1990–91	Djurgårdens IF	Elitserien	1	0	0	0	0	–	–	–	–	–
1990–91	Nacka HK	Division 1	32	4	4	8	8	–	–	–	–	–
1991–92	Nacka HK	Division 1	31	4	7	11	8	2	1	2	3	2
1992–93	Huddinge IK	Division 1	30	5	4	9	10	9	0	0	0	4
1993–94	Huddinge IK	Division 1	38	3	7	10	20	2	0	0	0	2
1994–95	Huddinge IK	Division 1	36	5	5	10	20	2	1	0	1	2
1994–95	Huddinge IK	J20 SuperElit	1	0	0	0	0	–	–	–	–	–
1995–96	Huddinge IK	Division 1	54	8	11	19	72	13	2	3	5	20
1996–97	Djurgårdens IF	Elitserien	44	6	7	13	34	4	0	0	0	4
1997–98	Djurgårdens IF	Elitserien	40	2	1	3	38	15	0	0	0	4
1998–99	Djurgårdens IF	EHL	5	0	0	0	0	–	–	–	–	–
1998–99	Djurgårdens IF	Elitserien	39	4	10	14	34	4	0	0	0	2
1999–2000	Djurgårdens IF	Elitserien	40	1	2	3	38	13	1	0	1	6
2000–01	Djurgårdens IF	Elitserien	40	2	5	7	16	16	1	1	2	12
2001–02	Djurgårdens IF	Elitserien	38	5	3	8	30	2	0	0	0	0
2002–03	Djurgårdens IF	Elitserien	46	0	5	5	30	12	0	0	0	20
2003–04	Djurgårdens IF	Elitserien	44	1	3	4	30	4	0	0	0	2
2004–05	Djurgårdens IF	Elitserien	43	1	1	2	14	12	0	0	0	10
2005–06	Djurgårdens IF	Elitserien	46	2	5	7	46	–	–	–	–	–
2006–07	Djurgårdens IF	Elitserien	51	0	6	6	68	–	–	–	–	–
2007–08	Djurgårdens IF	Elitserien	22	1	1	2	20	5	0	0	0	2
2008–09	Djurgårdens IF	Elitserien	45	0	3	3	34	–	–	–	–	–
