= David Schneider (ice hockey) =

American ice hockey player

- Born: August 24, 1979 (age 46) Chicago, United States
- Height: 5 ft 9 in (175 cm)
- Weight: 190 lb (86 kg; 13 st 8 lb)
- Position: Defense
- Shoots: Right
- Nationalliga A team Former teams: HC Ambrì-Piotta; Elitserien; Djurgårdens IF; SM-liiga; Tappara; HPK; TPS; Lukko
- Playing career: 2002–present

David Schneider (born August 24, 1979 in Chicago, United States) is a former professional ice hockey player. He was most recently a defenseman for HC Ambrì-Piotta in Nationalliga A. David currently works on Wall Street as an institutional equity advisor.

Schneider started his career at Princeton University in the NCAA where he played during the period 1998-2002. In 2002, he left for the Trenton Titans in the ECHL, thus starting his professional hockey career. After only 28 games, Schnieder moved to Finnish side Lukko Rauma in the SM-liiga but played only nine games due to a groin injury. David is married to Stephanie, and has two boys, Luke and Evan.

== Career statistics ==
			Regular season					Playoffs
Season	Team	League	GP	G	A	Pts	PIM	GP	G	A	Pts	PIM
1998–99	Princeton University	NCAA	21	1	0	1	24	–	–	–	–	–
1999–00	Princeton University	NCAA	30	5	11	16	22	–	–	–	–	–
2000–01	Princeton University	NCAA	23	8	7	15	22	–	–	–	–	–
2001–02	Princeton University	NCAA	24	4	14	18	20	–	–	–	–	–
2001–02	Trenton Titans	ECHL	2	0	1	1	5	–	–	–	–	–
2002–03	Trenton Titans	ECHL	26	5	11	16	22	–	–	–	–	–
2002–03	Lukko Rauma	SM-liiga	9	0	0	0	39	–	–	–	–	–
2003–04	TPS	SM-liiga	54	8	11	19	72	13	2	3	5	20
2004–05	TPS	SM-liiga	26	2	3	5	49	6	0	1	1	25
2005–06	HPK Hämeenlinna	SM-liiga	51	8	18	26	98	13	1	3	4	16
2006–07	HPK Hämeenlinna	SM-liiga	53	8	17	25	72	9	3	2	5	16
2007–08	Norfolk Admirals	AHL	71	2	25	27	70	–	–	–	–	–
2008–09	Tappara	SM-liiga	12	1	5	6	24	–	–	–	–	–
2008–09	Djurgårdens IF	SEL	41	7	11	18	42	–	–	–	–	–
