= Clive Weeden =

American basketball player (born 1987)

Personal information
- Born: November 22, 1987 (age 38) Massachusetts, United States
- Listed height: 6 ft 9 in (2.06 m)
- Listed weight: 220 lb (100 kg)

Career information
- High school: Nashoba Regional (Bolton, Massachusetts); Northfield Mount Hermon (Northfield, Massachusetts)
- College: Dartmouth (2007–2011)
- NBA draft: 2011: undrafted
- Playing career: 2011–present
- Position: Power forward / center

Career history
- 2011: ABA Strumica
- 2012: Étoile Sportive du Sahel
- 2013–2018; 2021; 2023–2025: South West Slammers

Career highlights
- Tunisian League champion (2012); Tunisian Cup champion (2012)

Clive-Warren Nye Harvey-Weeden (born November 22, 1987) is an American basketball player who last played for the South West Slammers of the NBL1 West. He played four seasons of college basketball for Dartmouth College before moving to Europe to begin his professional career. After short stints in Macedonia and Tunisia, Weeden arrived in Australia in 2013 and has played for the Slammers ever since.

== High school career ==
Weeden was born in the U.S. state of Massachusetts. His hometown is Stow, Massachusetts, and he attended Nashoba Regional High School in Bolton and Northfield Mount Hermon School in Northfield.

As a wide receiver and punter, Weeden recorded 450 receiving yards and six touchdowns in his one year of high school football during his sophomore year at Northfield Mount Hermon. Boston College and UConn were among the school's who were intrigued by Weeden's football talent. However, he tore his MCL in track and subsequently missed the whole summer and the beginning of the fall, so he decided to not play football in his junior year.

In October 2006, Weeden committed to the Dartmouth Big Green men's basketball team. Before committing to Dartmouth, Weeden was on Boston College's radar for academic reasons. Syracuse and Connecticut also made inquiries about Weeden and other coaches would occasionally stop by campus to check him out.

In addition to helping the Northfield Mount Hermon basketball team to 23 wins as a senior, Weeden also attended the New England Prep School track championship as a senior, placing second in the javelin, second in the triple jump and sixth in the discus.

== College career ==
Weeden played in 25 of the 28 games as a freshman at Dartmouth in 2007–08, starting two and averaging 11.8 minutes per game. He posted a season-high seven rebounds, including five on the offensive glass, against Brown on February 8, 2008. He scored a season-high six points twice, both coming in back-to-back games in late February.

As a sophomore in 2008–09, just as he had as a freshman, the ballhawking Weeden accomplished a rarity, grabbing more offensive rebounds than defensive. On January 3, 2009, he scored a career-high 10 points against Army. Against Penn at the Palestra on February 20, 2009, he was a perfect 3-for-3 from the field, scoring seven points and blocking two shots to help Dartmouth post its first season sweep of the Quakers in a half century. The next night, he grabbed three rebounds off the bench as the Big Green won at Princeton to complete its first sweep of the vaunted "Ps" in two decades.

As a junior in 2009–10, Weeden led Dartmouth in rebounding and ranked 10th in the Ivy League. He also had a team-best 16 blocks. Only two players in the conference averaged more offensive rebounds than Weeden. His first double-digit scoring game came against Furman on November 12, 2009, going 5-for-10 from the floor with his only career three-pointer for 11 points. He also grabbed 11 rebounds for his first career double-double in just 21 minutes on the court. He scored at least 11 points in two of the next three games as well, including a career-high 14 against Vermont along with 10 boards for another double-double. On February 13, 2010, he grabbed a career-high 13 rebounds against Yale.

As a senior in 2010–11, Weeden started every game and finished his career tying a school record with 109 games played. He is also ranked among the top 10 in Dartmouth history in blocked shots with 68. He tied career highs during the season, scoring 14 points against Colgate on November 27 and grabbing 13 rebounds against Yale on February 25. At 6'9", Weeden was the tallest player on a short Big Green team, but foul trouble often relegated him to the bench.

=== College statistics ===
Year	Team	GP	GS	MPG	FG%	3P%	FT%	RPG	APG	SPG	BPG	PPG
2007–08	Dartmouth	25	2	11.8	.462	.000	.500	2.2	.2	.2	.4	1.6
2008–09	Dartmouth	28	2	12.1	.444	.000	.500	2.3	.3	.1	.6	2.0
2009–10	Dartmouth	28	22	22.2	.401	.500	.554	4.8	.8	.5	.6	5.2
2010–11	Dartmouth	28	28	21.7	.409	.000	.563	4.6	1.1	.5	.9	5.1
Career		109	54	17.1	.416	.250	.543	3.5	.6	.4	.6	3.6

== Professional career ==
=== Macedonia and Tunisia ===
In September 2011, Weeden signed a contract to play professionally in the Macedonian League for ABA Strumica. He made his debut for Strumica on October 15, 2011. On December 3, 2011, he scored a season-high 19 points against Kožuv. In his final game for Strumica on December 21, 2011, he recorded a season-high 15 rebounds against Vardar. In 14 games, he averaged 9.8 points and 5.7 rebounds in 27.5 minutes per game.

In January 2012, Weeden joined Étoile Sportive du Sahel of the Tunisian League. The team won the 2011–12 league championship.

Weeden said of his first professional season, "My team in Macedonia was in a struggling situation and things fell apart but my team in Tunisia was one of the best in Africa."

=== South West Slammers ===
In February 2013, Weeden arrived in Australia to play for the South West Slammers of the State Basketball League (SBL). With Australian citizenship through his mother, Weeden was not classed as an import player. He helped the Slammers reach the playoffs but he missed their quarter-final series against the East Perth Eagles after having to return to the United States for family reasons.

In 2014, Weeden averaged career highs in points (21.0) and rebounds (10.9) per game.

In 2015, Weeden missed the Slammers' entire playoff run after rupturing his ACL in the second last round of the regular season. He returned midway through the 2016 season after 10 months on the sidelines. He came into the 2017 season fully fit and healthy.

After serving as co-captain between 2015 and 2017, Weeden was named sole captain of the Slammers in 2018. He missed time towards the end of the 2018 season due to personal commitments. The final game of the 2018 season marked Weeden's 150th for the Slammers. He did not return to the Slammers in 2019.

In May 2021, Weeden joined the Slammers for the rest of the 2021 NBL1 West season. In eight games, he averaged 4.5 points and 3.75 rebounds per game.

In April 2023, Weeden joined the Slammers for the 2023 NBL1 West season. In 15 games, he averaged 7.13 points, 4.13 rebounds and 1.6 assists per game.

Weeden re-joined the Slammers for the 2024 NBL1 West season. In six games, he averaged 2.83 points and 3.0 rebounds per game.

Weeden re-joined the Slammers for the 2025 NBL1 West season. In 15 games, he averaged 5.8 points, 3.0 rebounds and 1.07 assists per game. The 2025 season was slated to be his final season.

== SBL / NBL1 West statistics ==
Season	Team	Games	PPG	RPG	APG
2013	Slammers	26	17.5	7.8	1.3
2014	Slammers	28	21.0	10.9	1.9
2015	Slammers	24	16.7	6.4	1.7
2016	Slammers	23	9.3	8.1	2.0
2017	Slammers	29	12.8	6.6	1.0
2018	Slammers	20	11.0	6.1	1.3
2021	Slammers	8	4.5	3.8	0.5
2023	Slammers	15	7.1	4.1	1.6
2024	Slammers	6	2.8	3.0	0.7
2025	Slammers	15	5.8	3.0	1.1

== Personal life ==
Weeden is the son of Robert and the late Susan Weeden. His mother was born in Tasmania, Australia. In 2012, he obtained Australian citizenship through his mother. Weeden has one sister and one brother. Both of his grandfathers were professional tennis players.
