= Koren Zailckas =

American author (born 1980)

- Born: 1980 (age 45–46)
- Occupations: Writer, memoirist
- Writing career
- Genres: Literary fiction, memoir
- Subject: Alcohol abuse
- Notable work: Smashed
- Website: www.korenzailckas.com

Koren Zailckas (born 1980) is an American writer. Her debut, Smashed: Story of a Drunken Girlhood, became a New York Times bestseller. She is also a 2014 recipient of the Alex Awards.

== Early life ==
Zailckas grew up in a middle-class family in Shrewsbury, Massachusetts. As a coping mechanism, she learned to "hide behind an open book." As she grew older, she got into the habit of sneaking out of elementary school classes to go and read in the bathroom or the school library. She began writing poetry at age ten, and continued throughout college.

Zailckas attended Nashoba Regional High School in Bolton, Massachusetts.

== Education ==
Zailckas attended Syracuse University. She also briefly attended Bennington College in Vermont. In a senior-year poetry writing workshop at Syracuse she met mentor Mary Karr who would later influence her memoirs. In 2002, she graduated from Syracuse.

== Career ==
As a writer, Zailckas says her writing is informed by memoirists Mary Karr, Nick Flynn, Tobias Wolff, as well as novelists T. C. Boyle, Jeffrey Eugenides, A. M. Homes, Richard Ford, Haruki Murakami, Amy Hempel, George Saunders and Lorrie Moore. She has also admitted she is heavily influenced by music and song lyrics. Zailckas has been quoted as saying, "If you're a writer, there's a lot of inspiration to be found in lyrics. That's the first thing I do before I get to work in the morning: have a cup of coffee and put on a record."

Zailckas downplays the catharsis of memoir-writing, saying, "All said and done, I'm reluctant to say writing Smashed was cathartic. For one, I think we assign that term to women far more often than we assign it to men. All too often, men's works are deemed 'literature' and women's are dismissed as 'therapy.' On a personal level, sure, it's easier to discuss old indignities. Talking, for instance, about a horrifying blackout doesn't rattle me the way it used to. I'm not convinced I've come to term with old aches as much as I've had to numb myself to them for the sake of spreading the book's message. Ultimately, I think a memoir leaves its author with more terror than comfort, more questions than closure. More than anything, I feel a growing breach between 'me' and the 'me' on the page. It's an occupational hazard, I guess. I feel sort of exiled from my own experiences."

Early in her career, Zailckas said she found writing fiction more challenging than writing narrative non-fiction. "For me, fiction-writing is about escapism. Whereas memoir-writing is about facing cold, harsh realities. I'll let you guess which one is more of a party... Naw, in reality, there are challenges to both. In memoir, there's the burden of truth. And in fiction, there's the burden of fantasy. Me, I find fiction harder. There are so many possibilities in fiction. The story can go absolutely anywhere. And that overwhelms me. That strikes fear in my timid, little heart. I like being restricted to the cage of fact, the coop of reality. Without it, I feel a certain agoraphobia."

Regardless, she switched to fiction writing in later life when she was troubled by the way some people take memoir as liturgy and the publishing industry often turns memoirists as self-help gurus. She is quoted as saying she has no desire to tell people how to live their "best lives." She also feels she can be more truthful in fiction and the medium allows her to provide more privacy for her children. She authored the novels Mother, Mother, which won an Alex Award, and The Drama Teacher.

=== Smashed ===
Smashed chronicles Zailckas' decade-long struggle with alcohol abuse, beginning at fourteen, in an effort to explain the binge drinking phenomenon that plagues America's youth.

Around the time she quit drinking, Zailckas became preoccupied with an old memory, which involved a night that she had her stomach pumped when she was 16. According to Zailckas, she had not thought about that night in a number of years, but she suddenly could not get it out of her head. Eventually, she sat down and wrote about it. The piece later became a chapter in her book.

Around the same time, Zailckas was hearing a lot in the news about "girls of her generation" and how they were drinking younger and more than all the generations of women who'd gone before them. The Harvard School of Public Health reported, between 1993 and 2001, there was a threefold increase in the number of women who reported being drunk on ten or more occasions in the previous month. Time ran a cover story about female binge drinkers. Zailckas did not agree with what the psychologists and the sociologists, the clinicians and the statisticians had to say, which was: "girls today are drinking more because they’re just so damn liberated, because they’re bursting with confidence and girl power, because they believe they can match boys everywhere, including the bar." In her own experience, the author says, she and her female friends drank largely because it was an expression of their unhappiness and lack of confidence. It occurred to Zailckas, then 23, that she could offer a younger perspective.

Smashed was Zailckas' first attempt at writing prose. Before that, she had been a poet exclusively. Her poetic style was noted by The New York Times critic Dwight Garner who called it "so elegiac that [Zailckas] comes off as the Norah Jones of her plastered generation."

==== Alcoholism ====
Zailckas has been challenged by some readers who want to dispute her assertion that she is "not an alcoholic." In interviews, Zailckas maintains: "I’ve talked to a lot of addiction counselors who say alcoholism is made up of two things: abuse and addiction. God knows I had that abuse down pat. But I don’t know that I necessarily felt (or feel) that addiction. And so no, I don’t identify myself as an alcoholic. That identity didn’t feel true to me, so I didn’t write it. I also think the brand 'alcoholic' prevents a lot of people, especially young people, from seeking help or even reevaluating their relationship with alcohol. In my mind, the whole point of Smashed is to say, you don’t have to be a quote-unquote alcoholic in order to examine the underlying reasons why you're drinking."

==== PTSD ====
Since writing Smashed, Zailckas has said she did not realize that she had spent decades living with complex PTSD, brought about by her abusive childhood. She now identifies PTSD as one of the driving forces behind her college drinking. "I was drinking to dissociate: unwittingly or unconsciously putting myself in situations exactly like the one with my alcoholic father."

=== Fury ===
In February 2010, Zailckas announced a sequel to Smashed on her Facebook page. Her follow-up, Fury: A Memoir was published on September 7, 2010. It was published by Viking Penguin, who described it as relating her exploration with her feelings of anger, the effects of that anger and the psychological aspects of repression and the turmoil of her own life which caused it. The book combines psychological research with her personal story.

=== Mother, Mother ===
In 2014, Zailckas published her first debut novel Mother, Mother. The book was heavily inspired by her experience growing up with a narcissistic mother. The book won an Alex Award, a prize which is presented by the American Library Association.

=== The Drama Teacher ===
In 2018, Zailckas published The Drama Teacher, which tells the story of a female grifter and identity thief. Literary critics think it is also Zailckas' way of exposing her father as the truly abusive person in her damaging childhood. The book was optioned by 20th Century Fox and later by Amy Sherman-Palladino, who plans to turn it into a limited series.

== Personal life ==
Zailckas has four children. In 2008, she married the musician Eamon Hamilton. Around 2020, they got divorced.

In 2023, she re-married.

== Awards and honors ==
- In 2014, she earned an Alex Award, given to ten young adult books a year, for her novel Mother, Mother.

== Bibliography ==
- Smashed: Story of a Drunken Girlhood. New York: Viking/Penguin Group (USA), 2005. ISBN 0-670-03376-6
- Fury, 2010
- Mother, Mother, 2014
- The Drama Teacher, 2018
