= Nashoba Regional School District =

School district in Massachusetts

Address
- 50 Mechanic Street Bolton, Worcester County, Massachusetts, 01740; United States
- Coordinates: 42.4315°N 71.6081°W

District information
- Type: Public
- Grades: PreK – 12
- Established: March, 1951
- Superintendent: Kirk Downing
- School board: 11 members
- Chair of the board: Leah Vivirito
- Schools: 2 Elementary, 2 Middle, 1 PreK – 8, 1 High
- Budget: $58 million
- NCES District ID: 2508310

Students and staff
- Students: 3228
- Teachers: 265.18
- Student–teacher ratio: 12.17:1
- Colors: Green and Gold

Other information
- Website: www.nrsd.net

The Nashoba Regional School District (Nashoba District or NRSD) is a school district that is based in Bolton, Massachusetts (USA) and also serves the towns of Lancaster and Stow.

== Schools ==
- Nashoba Regional High School
- Stow
  - Hale Middle School
  - The Center School
- Bolton
  - Florence Sawyer School
- Lancaster
  - Mary Rowlandson Elementary School
  - Luther Burbank Middle School

== Governance ==
The district is run by the superintendent and assistant superintendent, who answers to an eleven member school board, which is made up of citizens of the three towns that the district serves.

== History ==
=== Before the district ===
Early students in the area that would eventually become the district were usually taught privately, often by the minister. The first record of schooling in Stow dates to December 13, 1714, when a schoolmaster was chosen. Initially teaching was done in private houses, but in 1733, three school-houses were built. By 1789, the town had grown to five school-houses, at which time the state legislature mandated the creation of small school districts that would serve a fraction of a town. Correspondingly, each school-house was turned into a district. These small schools only taught up to a middle school education.

Shortly after 1823, Stow created an academy, aptly named Stow Academy, to teach "the languages and higher branches of English." Students came to this school from across Massachusetts, New England, as well as Louisiana, Maryland, and what would later become Canada. The academy closed down about twenty years later, likely because the other area schools had improved in quality.

Stow established Hale High School in 1871 after a donation of $5000 from Elijah Hale. The school used the building and grounds of Stow Academy until 1903, when the building was rebuilt.

As transportation became easier in the early 1900s, this early school district system was done away with completely, replacing the local primary schools with ones for entire towns – Stow opened Union School in 1902.

=== Formation ===
The Nashoba Regional School District was established in March, 1951 and was originally planned to serve about 400 students. In March, 1953, Stow withdrew from the district, although it later rejoined. Nashoba Regional High School opened in 1961 and by 1966 had 535 students enrolled. The old Stow high school, Hale High School, began to be used for junior high school students and changed its name to Hale Junior High School. The original Hale building burned down in 1963 and was rebuilt in 1964. The new high school had an innovative "Curriculum Materials Center" that had a focus on electronic media, which was new at the time.

=== History ===
In first couple of decades of the district, it only served students from grades 9 through 12, with younger students in elementary superintendency union districts. Even after the district grew to encompass students starting in kindergarten, pre-highschool students had little exposure to students from the other towns in the district, other than through programs like sports camps, like the Nashoba Summer Baseball Camp, which was founded in 2002. In 2010, a summer theatre camp was started at the high school to help students from the three towns get to know each other.

The district also includes education programs for preschoolers.

In the early 2000s, the district faced some financial issues. In September 2002, the district eliminated media specialists (ie. librarians) at all the schools in the district other than the high school. After the layoffs, the libraries at the schools were run by volunteers, including retired librarians and the former librarians. In October, the next month, the state put the finances of the district under the control of the state government due to a $3.4 million deficit. The district got a new superintendent, Michael Wood, to help the district financially recover.

The district participated in a school choice program that was ended in 2015, due to a lack of space available for incoming students, especially in the high school, although already enrolled students were allowed to remain. It had been proposed and turned down in previous years, due to concerns that the district needed the extra funding provided by the program and that siblings of school choice students should be allowed to attend the same school. Another space saving measure has been to add portable classrooms.

In 2012, the district began hiring part-time armed school resource officers to work part time in the high school to help both educate the students in safety and directly protect students from threats. Other security measures, like a buzzer by the entrance, have also been implemented.

In 2013, the district instituted a bring your own device program, allowing high school students to bring their personal electronic devices for use in education. In 2015, the district started a program that provided all eighth graders with Chromebooks in order to enhance the learning experience for students.
