= Niklas Andersson (ice hockey, born 1986) =

Swedish ice hockey player

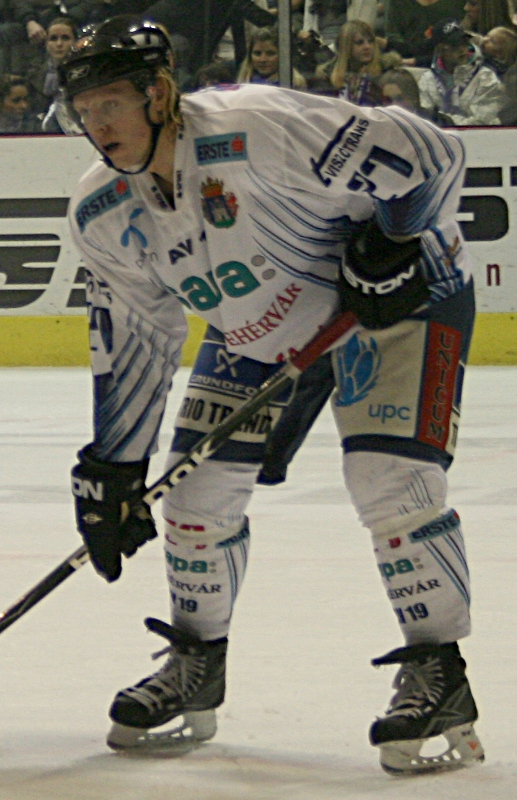
- Born: March 5, 1986 (age 39); Stockholm, SWE
- Height: 6 ft 2 in (188 cm)
- Weight: 198 lb (90 kg; 14 st 2 lb)
- Position: Defence
- Shoots: Right
- EBEL team: Alba-Volán
- Playing career: 2003–present

Niklas Andersson (born March 5, 1986) is a professional Swedish ice hockey player. He is currently a defenceman for Alba-Volán in the EBEL.

== Career statistics ==
			Regular Season					Playoffs
Season	Team	League	GP	G	A	Pts	PIM	GP	G	A	Pts	PIM
2002–03	Brynäs IF	J20 SuperElit	23	1	3	4	2	—	—	—	—	—
2003–04	Brynäs IF	Elitserien	2	0	0	0	0	—	—	—	—	—
2003–04	Brynäs IF	J20 SuperElit	32	4	5	9	26	5	0	2	2	4
2004–05	Brynäs IF	Elitserien	36	0	1	1	12	1	0	0	0	0
2004–05	Brynäs IF	J20 SuperElit	7	2	3	5	6	—	—	—	—	—
2005–06	Brynäs IF	Elitserien	35	0	0	0	26	2	0	0	0	0
2005–06	Almtuna IS	Allsvenskan	7	2	0	2	8	—	—	—	—	—
2006–07	Almtuna IS	Allsvenskan	43	4	6	10	42	—	—	—	—	—
2007–08	Växjö Lakers	Allsvenskan	43	4	18	22	61	3	0	0	0	2
2008–09	Djurgårdens IF	Elitserien	33	0	2	2	12	—	—	—	—	—
2010	Alba-Volán SAPA Fehérvár AV19	EBEL	7	1	1	2	8	-	-	-	-	-
