= Alexander Deilert =

Swedish ice hockey player

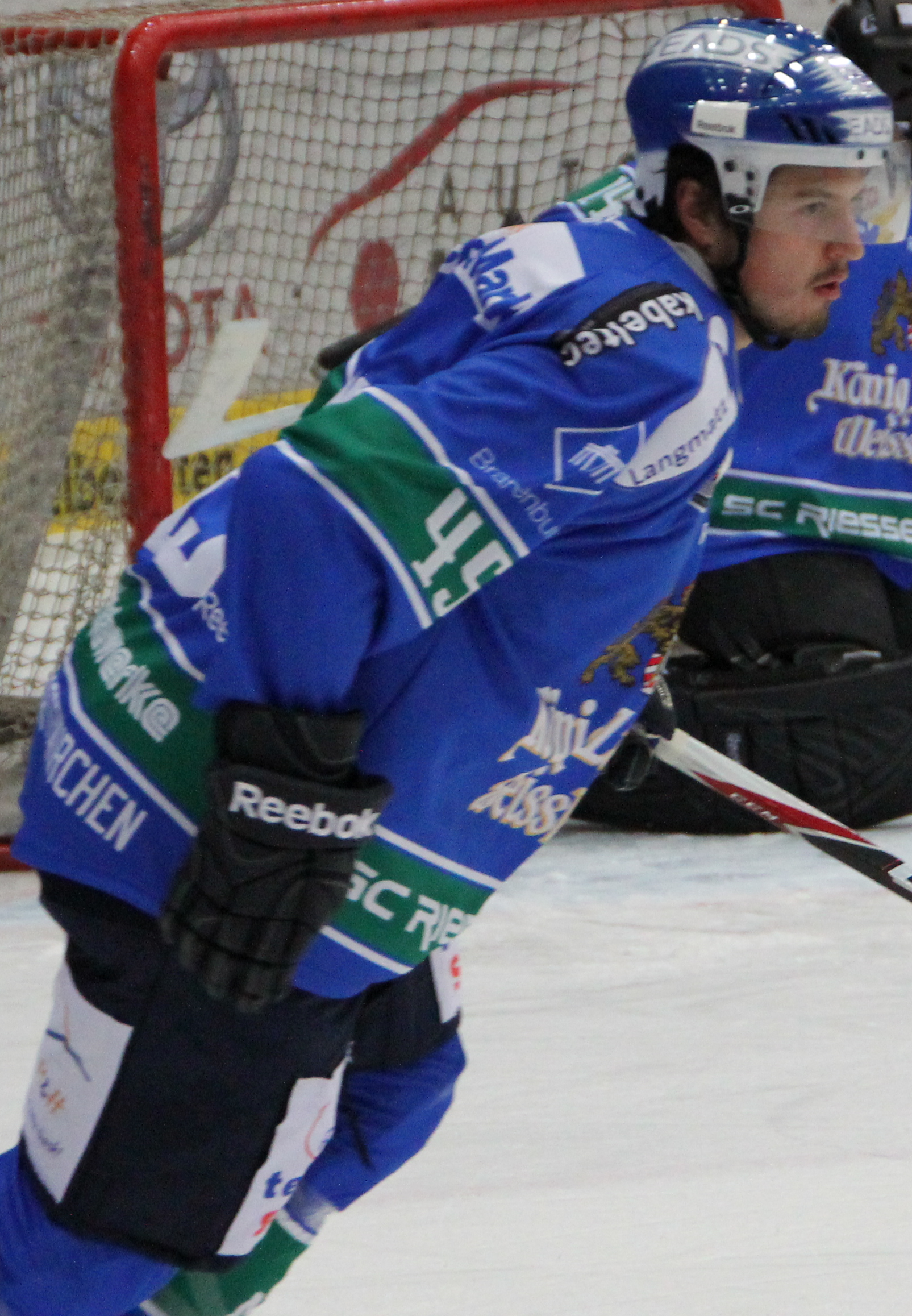
- Born: February 10, 1989 (age 37) Stockholm, Sweden
- Height: 6 ft 0 in (183 cm)
- Weight: 183 lb (83 kg; 13 st 1 lb)
- Position: Defence
- Shot: Right
- Played for: Djurgårdens IF; Frisk Asker; Karlskrona HK
- NHL draft: 198th overall, 2008; Calgary Flames
- Playing career: 2008–2022

Alexander Deilert (born February 10, 1989) is a Swedish former professional ice hockey defenceman who played in the Swedish Hockey League (SHL).

== Playing career ==
Deilert played for AIK IF in the HockeyAllsvenskan, Karlskrona HK of the Swedish Hockey League (SHL). and Djurgårdens in the Elitserien during the 2008–09 season. He was drafted by the Calgary Flames in the seventh round of the 2008 NHL entry draft, 198th overall.

== Career statistics ==
			Regular season					Playoffs
Season	Team	League	GP	G	A	Pts	PIM	GP	G	A	Pts	PIM
2006–07	Djurgårdens IF	J20	28	1	4	5	10	7	0	0	0	0
2007–08	Djurgårdens IF	J20	38	6	12	18	70	7	1	2	3	14
2008–09	Djurgårdens IF	J20	19	4	7	11	45	—	—	—	—	—
2008–09	Djurgårdens IF	SEL	6	0	0	0	0	—	—	—	—	—
2008–09	Almtuna IS	Allsv	6	0	1	1	2	—	—	—	—	—
2008–09	Frisk Asker	GET	8	1	4	5	6	—	—	—	—	—
2009–10	Djurgårdens IF	SEL	26	0	1	1	0	5	0	0	0	0
2009–10	Mora IK	Allsv	32	5	11	16	30	—	—	—	—	—
2010–11	Djurgårdens IF	SEL	27	0	1	1	4	—	—	—	—	—
2010–11	Sundsvall IF	Allsv	2	1	0	1	0	—	—	—	—	—
2010–11	Orebro HK	Allsv	21	5	8	13	16	7	0	1	1	0
2011–12	Leksands IF	J20	4	2	2	4	6	—	—	—	—	—
2011–12	Leksands IF	Allsv	3	0	0	0	2	—	—	—	—	—
2011–12	Borlänge HF	Div.1	3	1	2	3	2	—	—	—	—	—
2011–12	Riessersee SC	2.GBun	25	6	9	15	38	—	—	—	—	—
2012–13	Asplöven HC	Allsv	51	9	15	24	93	—	—	—	—	—
2013–14	Bofors IK	Allsv	45	12	15	27	53	6	0	4	4	10
2014–15	Djurgårdens IF	SHL	30	0	1	1	4	—	—	—	—	—
2015–16	Mora IK	Allsv	44	5	24	29	32	5	0	2	2	6
2016–17	Karlskrona HK	SHL	12	2	1	3	0	—	—	—	—	—
2017–18	Karlskrona HK	SHL	20	1	1	2	6	—	—	—	—	—
2017–18	AIK	Allsv	24	3	10	13	10	—	—	—	—	—
2018–19	AIK	Allsv	36	7	24	31	38	5	0	2	2	0
2019–20	IF Björklöven	Allsv	34	6	20	26	49	2	0	0	0	0
2020–21	IF Björklöven	Allsv	51	10	20	30	24	13	4	8	12	4
2021–22	AIK	Allsv	17	2	8	10	33	—	—	—	—	—
SHL totals			121	3	5	8	14	5	0	0	0	0
