= Hal Gill =

American ice hockey player (born 1975)

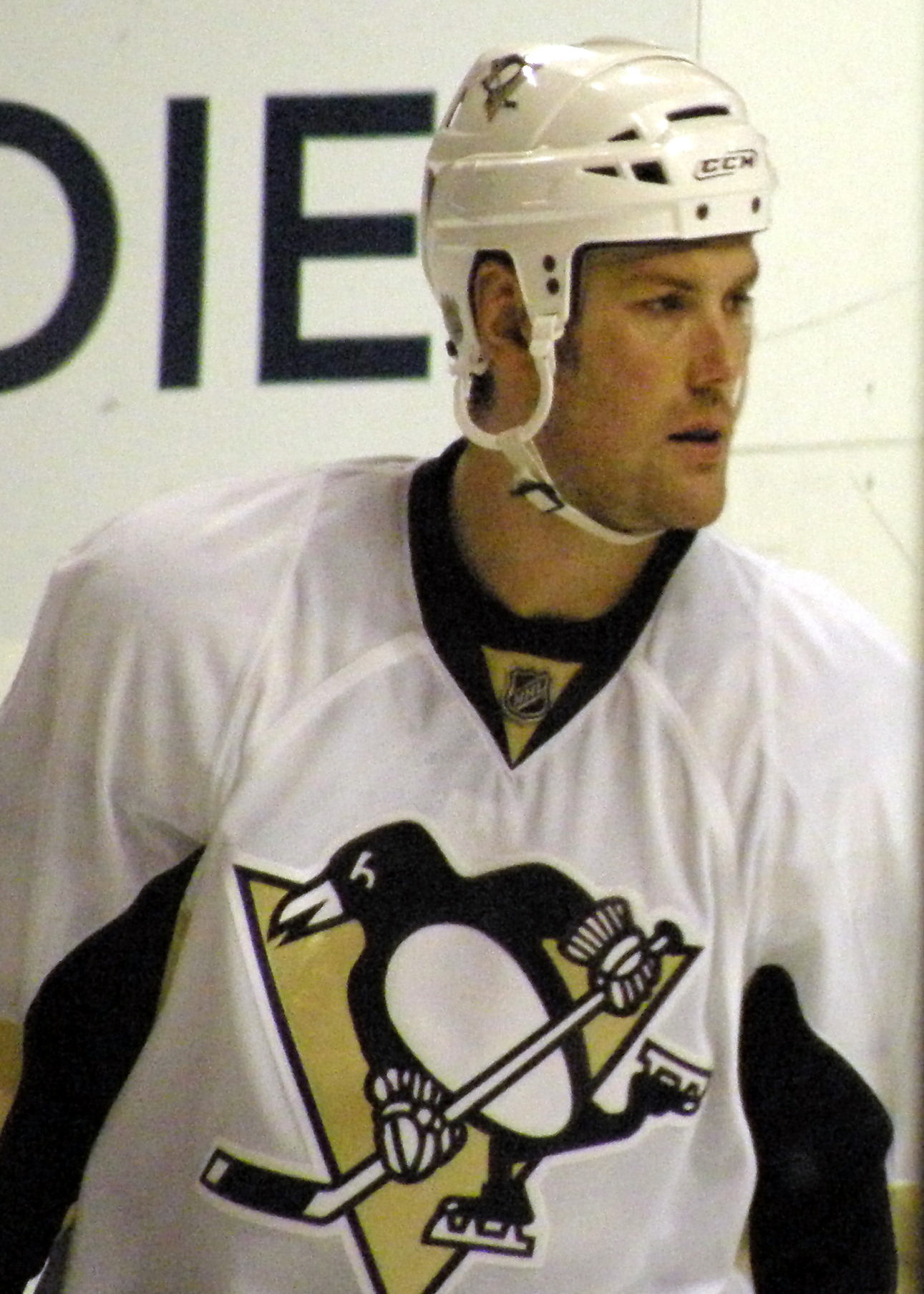
- Gill with the Pittsburgh Penguins in 2008
- Born: April 6, 1975 (age 51) Concord, Massachusetts, U.S.
- Height: 6 ft 7 in (201 cm)
- Weight: 250 lb (113 kg; 17 st 12 lb)
- Position: Defense
- Shot: Left
- Played for: Boston Bruins; Toronto Maple Leafs; Pittsburgh Penguins; Montreal Canadiens; Nashville Predators; Philadelphia Flyers; Lukko
- National team: United States
- NHL draft: 207th overall, 1993; Boston Bruins
- Playing career: 1997–2014

Harold Priestley Gill III (born April 6, 1975) is an American former professional ice hockey defenseman who played 16 NHL seasons with six different teams, winning the Stanley Cup with the Pittsburgh Penguins in 2009.

He also played for the Boston Bruins, Toronto Maple Leafs, Montreal Canadiens, Nashville Predators and Philadelphia Flyers. Gill was formerly manager of player development for the Florida Panthers.

Hal has also worked as a radio color commentator for the Predators on the Nashville Predators Radio Network. In September 2022 it was announced Gil would also become a co-host of Predators Live on Bally Sports with Lyndsay Rowley, serving as an analyst.

== Playing career ==
Before college, Gill played hockey at Nashoba Regional High School in Bolton, Massachusetts during his senior year he scored 50 points in 20 games. He was also a dual sport athlete and was a notable quarterback throughout high school.

Gill was selected in the eighth round, 207th overall, by the Boston Bruins in the 1993 NHL entry draft. Following the draft, he spent four seasons at Providence College. Over his four seasons, Gill appeared in 131 games, recording 12 goals and 33 assists for 45 points, along with 154 penalty minutes. In his sophomore year he only played to 26 games due to injury. During his junior year he had fully recovered and helped the team win the 1996 Hockey East Men's Ice Hockey Tournament scoring 17 points. Gill captained the team his senior year in 1997, recording a collegiate career-high 21 points in 35 games.

Gill made his NHL debut during the 1997–98 NHL season, skating in Gill played 68 games, recording 2 goals and 4 assists for 6 points while accumulating 47 penalty minutes, establishing a physical presence on the blue line with his 6-foot-7, 240-pound frame. His first NHL goal came on November 13, 1997, in a 4–2 loss to the St. Louis Blues, assisted by Steve Sullivan and Rob DiMaio. He was a regular for the Bruins for the next six seasons. In his second season, he played in 80 games – starting a streak of nine straight seasons that he played in at least 76 games. He had his best statical season during the 2001-02 season scoring 22 points. He was also named the John P. Bucyk Award winner at the end of the season. In 2002-03, Gill led the team in plus-minus (+21) – the best rating in his career, he also scored 17 points. During the 2004–05 NHL lockout, Gill played for Lukko in the Finnish SM-liiga. Gil played his last season with the Bruins during the 2005-06 season where he played in 80 games scoring 10 points.

On July 1, 2006, the Toronto Maple Leafs signed Gill to a three-year contract, ending his tenure in Boston following nine seasons. He appeared in 145 games for the organization over two seasons scoring 20 points each year.

On February 26, 2008, the Maple Leafs traded Gill to the Pittsburgh Penguins in exchange for a 2008 second-round pick and 2009 fifth-round pick. Gil and the Penguins reached the Stanley Cup Final, losing in six games to the Detroit Red Wings. The following year during the 2008–09 regular season, Gill appeared in 62 games for Pittsburgh, contributing 2 goals and 8 assists for 10 points while posting a +11 plus-minus rating and accumulating 53 penalty minutes. His defensive prowess was evident in his physical play, including 112 blocked shots and 78 hits, he also was a key contributor on the team’s penalty kill. The team once again reached the Stanley Cup Final, this time defeating the Red Wings to win the Stanley Cup.

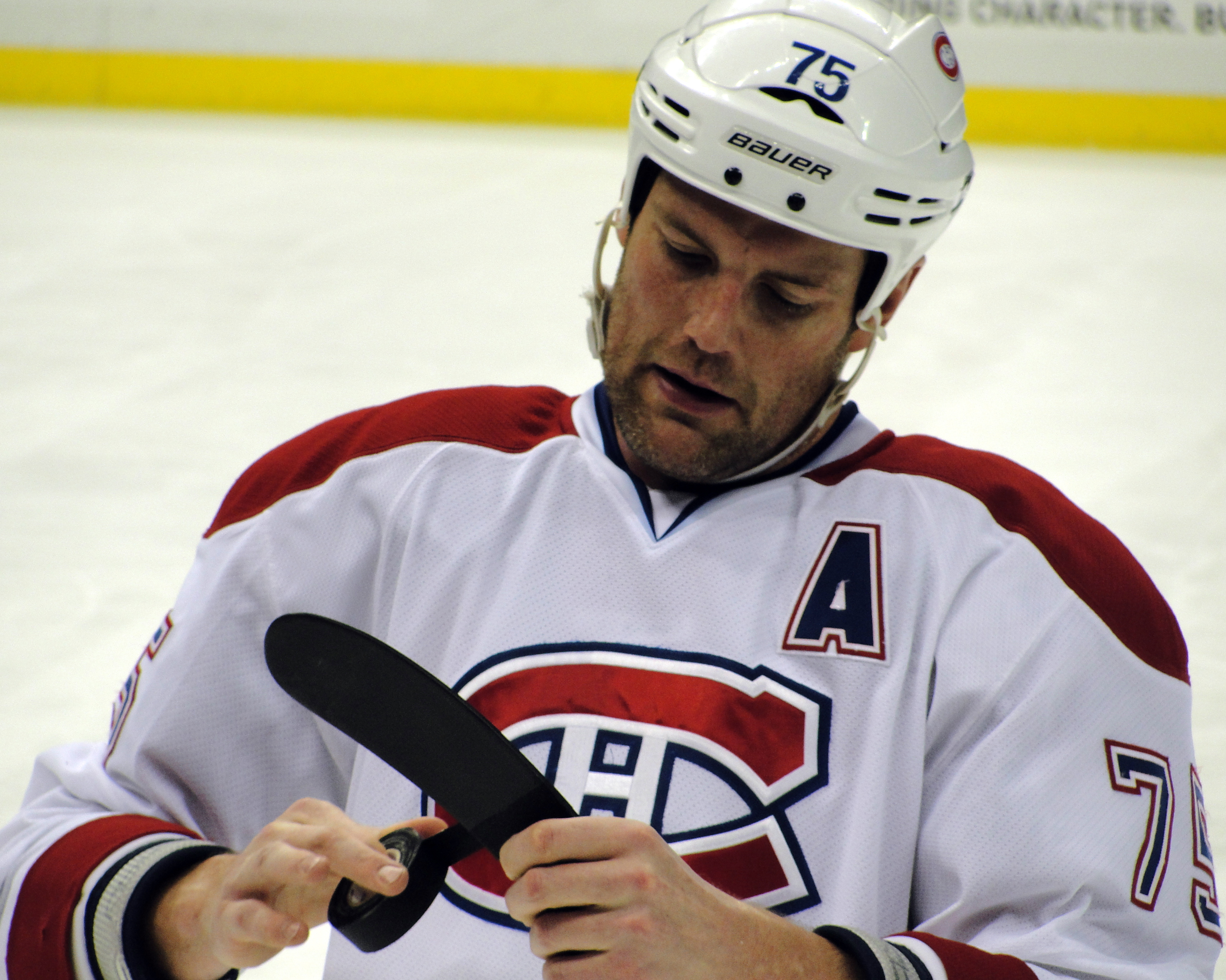
Hal Gill, Montreal Canadiens, January 2012

On July 1, 2009, Gill signed a two-year, $4.5 million contract with the Montreal Canadiens. During the 2009–10, Gill established himself as a reliable top-pairing defenseman, often paired with Josh Gorges, logging significant ice time in defensive situations and contributing to the team's penalty-kill unit, which ranked among the league's better units at 82.7 percent efficiency. He appeared in all 82 regular-season games, recording 4 goals and 11 assists for 15 points while accumulating 53 penalty minutes. During the postseason the club reached the Eastern Conference Finals, falling in five games to the Philadelphia Flyers. Gill was given credit for his performance in the first round against the Washington Capitals, as he defended extremely well against the Capitals’ biggest scorers. In the 2010 Stanley Cup playoffs, Gill recorded one assist and blocked 68 shots, helping the Canadiens pull off one of the biggest playoff upsets. On May 31, 2011, the Canadiens signed Gill to a one-year, $2.25 million contract extension. During the 2010–11 season, he played 75 games, posting 2 goals and 7 assists with 43 penalty minutes, the team lost to the Boston Bruins in the first round. His role on the penalty kill was particularly notable; Gill developed a distinctive style of dropping to his hands and knees to obstruct shooting lanes, which became a key factor in the Canadiens' 84.4 percent success rate that year.

On February 17, 2012, the Canadiens traded Gill (along with a 2013 conditional fifth-round pick) to the Nashville Predators in exchange for Blake Geoffrion, Robert Slaney and a 2012 second-round pick. On June 29, 2012, the Predators re-signed Gill to a two-year, $4 million contract extension. As the 2012–13 NHL lockout shortened the eventual season, Gill went scoreless in 30 games. On July 5, 2013, Gill's contract was bought out by the Predators after passing through unconditional waivers.

On September 7, 2013, the Philadelphia Flyers signed Gill to a professional try-out, allowing him to attend their training camp. On October 1, the team signed him to a one-year, $700,000 contract. Gill played in a mere six games for the Flyers, mainly serving as a healthy scratch.

Even though he up on the older side and didn’t have a contract for 2014-15, Gill worked out all summer as though he was going to be in a camp this fall. However it never came to fruition and on April 23, 2015, Gill announced his retirement from professional hockey following 16 seasons.

== International career ==
Gil represented the United States in 5 World Championships (2000, 2001, 2004, 2005, 2006) in 2004 he captured a bronze medal playing 9 games and recording 2 assists. He also served as an alternate captain during the 2006 games.

Medal record

Representing United States

Ice hockey

World Championships
Bronze medal – third place	2004 Prague	

== Post-playing career ==
In 2014 Gil served as an assistant coach at Lincoln-Sudbury High School alongside former teammate Andrew Raycroft.

On October 16, 2015, the Florida Panthers announced they had hired Gill as their manager of player development. He departed after one season.

Following his departure he returned to Lincoln Sudbury High School now as the head coach, over the next two seasons he led the team to a overall record of 29-13-5 and led the Warriors to two postseason berths. The first of which saw L-S win the 2016 Division 2 North title. The following year the team went 13-6-3 in lost in the Division 2 North quarterfinals. During this time Gil also spent 3 seasons as an assistant coach for the girls lacrosse team.

On August 23, 2017, Gill joined 102.5 The Game and the Nashville Predators Radio Network as a radio color analyst alongside Pete Weber. In September 2022 it was announced Gil would also become an analyst on Predators Live on Bally Sports with Lyndsay Rowley. Gil also occasionally servers as a intermission commentator.

== Personal life ==
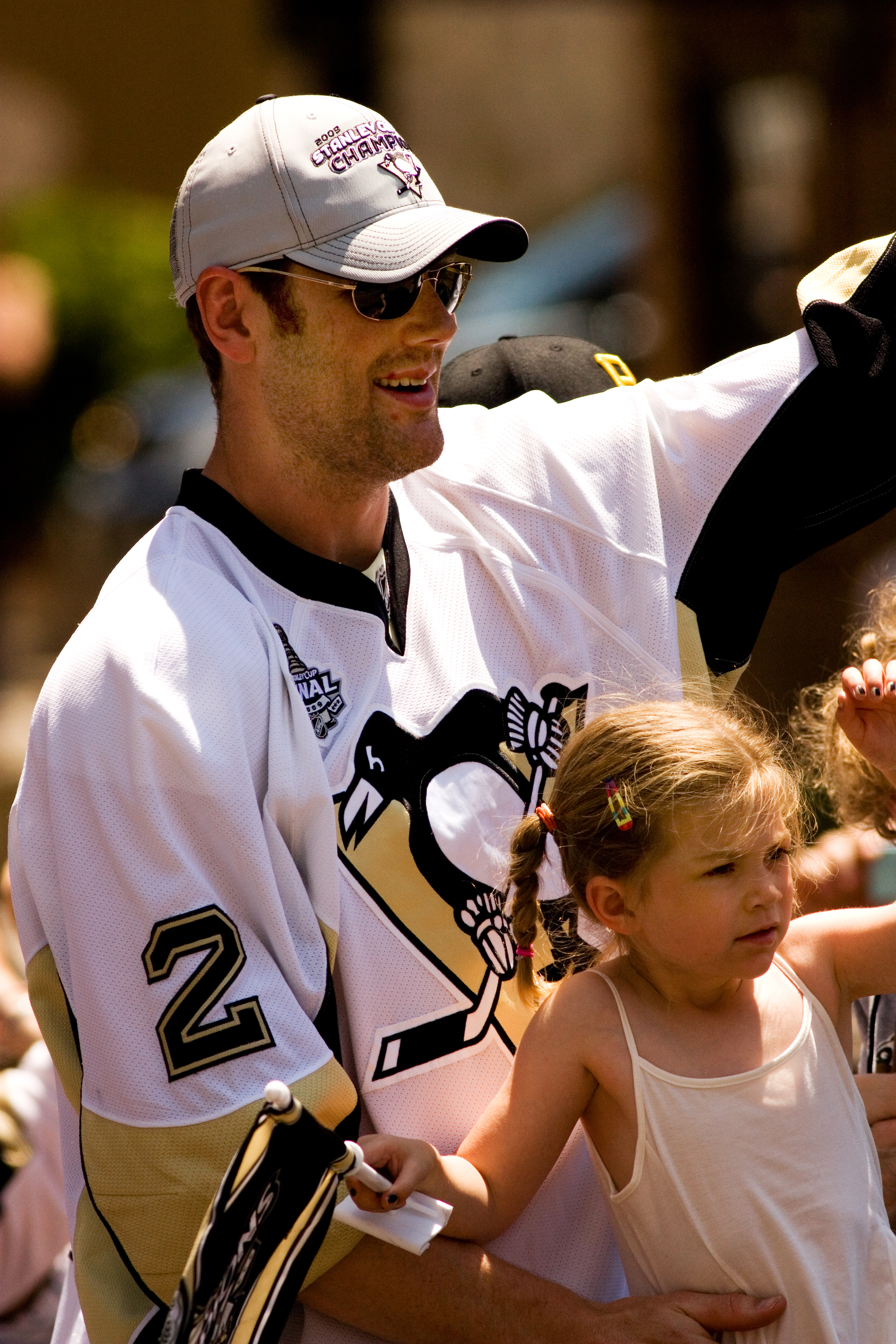
Gil with his daughter during the Penguins championship parade in 2009

Gill grew up in Bolton, Massachusetts and attended Nashoba Regional High School. He is married to Anne the two met during their time at Providence College, they have 2 daughters Isabelle and Sophie along with 1 son Talon. He used to live in Massachusetts but now resides in Nashville and is active in the community.

Gil is actively involved in youth hockey camps, and runs The Hal Gill Hockey Academy camp during the Summers.

== Career statistics ==
=== Regular season and playoffs ===
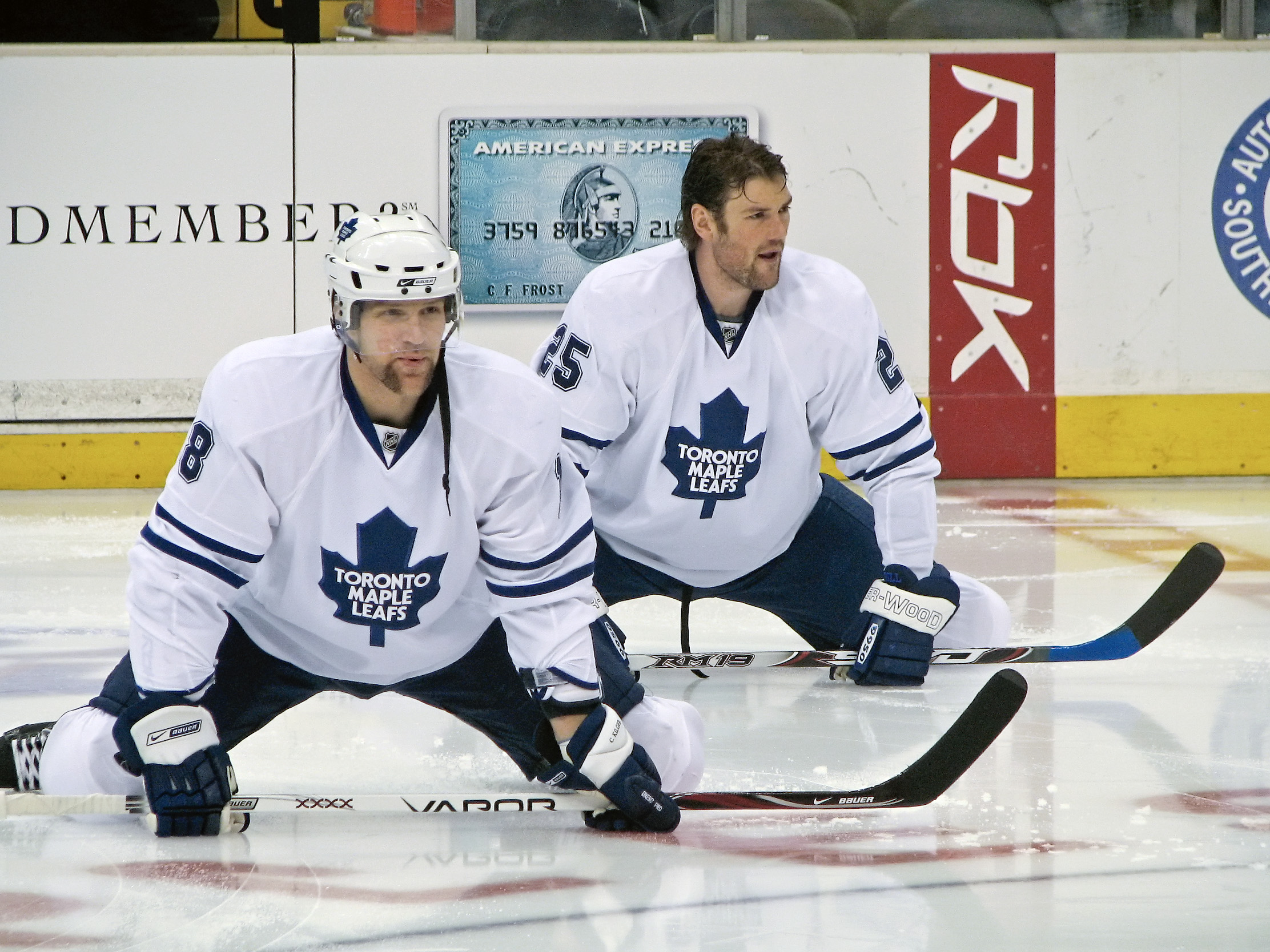
Gill (right) alongside Chad Kilger, January 2008

			Regular season					Playoffs
Season	Team	League	GP	G	A	Pts	PIM	GP	G	A	Pts	PIM
1992–93	Nashoba Regional High School	HS-MA	20	25	25	50	—	—	—	—	—	—
1993–94	Providence College	HE	31	1	2	3	26	—	—	—	—	—
1994–95	Providence College	HE	26	1	3	4	22	—	—	—	—	—
1995–96	Providence College	HE	39	5	12	17	54	—	—	—	—	—
1996–97	Providence College	HE	35	5	16	21	52	—	—	—	—	—
1997–98	Providence Bruins	AHL	4	1	0	1	23	—	—	—	—	—
1997–98	Boston Bruins	NHL	68	2	4	6	47	6	0	0	0	4
1998–99	Boston Bruins	NHL	80	3	7	10	63	12	0	0	0	14
1999–00	Boston Bruins	NHL	81	3	9	12	120	—	—	—	—	—
2000–01	Boston Bruins	NHL	80	1	10	11	71	—	—	—	—	—
2001–02	Boston Bruins	NHL	79	4	18	22	77	6	0	1	1	2
2002–03	Boston Bruins	NHL	76	4	13	17	13	5	0	0	0	4
2003–04	Boston Bruins	NHL	82	2	7	9	99	7	0	1	1	4
2004–05	Lukko	SM-liiga	31	2	8	10	110	8	0	0	0	57
2005–06	Boston Bruins	NHL	80	1	9	10	124	—	—	—	—	—
2006–07	Toronto Maple Leafs	NHL	82	6	14	20	91	—	—	—	—	—
2007–08	Toronto Maple Leafs	NHL	63	2	18	20	52	—	—	—	—	—
2007–08	Pittsburgh Penguins	NHL	18	1	3	4	16	20	0	1	1	12
2008–09	Pittsburgh Penguins	NHL	62	2	8	10	53	24	0	2	2	6
2009–10	Montreal Canadiens	NHL	68	2	9	11	68	18	0	1	1	20
2010–11	Montreal Canadiens	NHL	75	2	7	9	43	7	0	0	0	2
2011–12	Montreal Canadiens	NHL	53	1	7	8	29	—	—	—	—	—
2011–12	Nashville Predators	NHL	23	0	5	5	8	5	0	0	0	0
2012–13	Nashville Predators	NHL	32	0	0	0	12	—	—	—	—	—
2013–14	Philadelphia Flyers	NHL	6	0	0	0	2	1	0	0	0	0
NHL totals			1,108	36	148	184	962	111	0	6	6	68

=== International ===
Year	Team	Event	GP	G	A	Pts	PIM
2000	United States	WC	7	0	0	0	14
2001	United States	WC	9	0	0	0	4
2004	United States	WC	9	0	2	2	12
2005	United States	WC	7	0	0	0	6
2006	United States	WC	7	0	0	0	14
Senior totals			39	0	2	2	50

== Accomplishments ==
- John P. Bucyk Award winner in 2002
- Stanley Cup Champion 2009
- Nashoba Regional High School Athletics Hall of Fame: 2009 (inaugural class)

== See also ==
- List of NHL players with 1,000 games played
