= Tim Eriksson =

Swedish ice hockey player (born 1982)

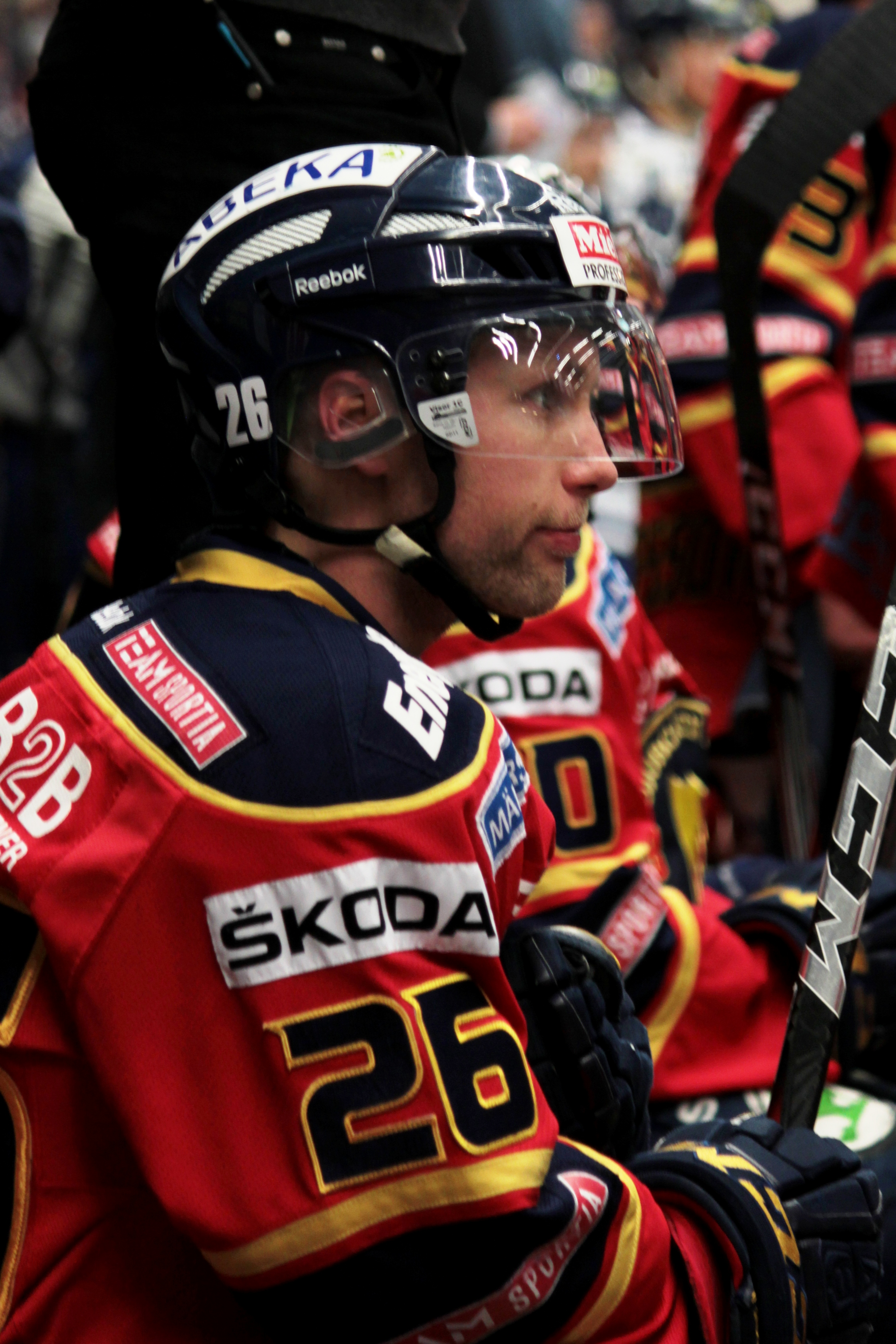
- Born: February 5, 1982 (age 43); Södertälje, Sweden
- Height: 5 ft 9 in (175 cm)
- Weight: 165 lb (75 kg; 11 st 11 lb)
- Position: Left wing
- Shot: Left
- Elitserien team Former teams: Djurgårdens IF Hockey; Linköpings HC
- NHL draft: 206th overall, 2000; Los Angeles Kings
- Playing career: 2000–2014

Tim Eriksson (born February 5, 1982) is a professional Swedish ice hockey player. He has played a long time for Linköpings HC, but after the 07/08 season he went to Djurgårdens IF.

== Career statistics ==
=== Regular season and playoffs ===
			Regular season					Playoffs
Season	Team	League	GP	G	A	Pts	PIM	GP	G	A	Pts	PIM
1998–99	Västra Frölunda HC	J20	29	7	8	15	6	—	—	—	—	—
1999–2000	Västra Frölunda HC	J20	36	16	25	41	82	6	1	6	7	4
2000–01	Hammarby IF	J20	1	2	1	3	0	—	—	—	—	—
2000–01	Hammarby IF	Allsv	38	10	21	31	18	9	0	4	4	2
2001–02	Hammarby IF	Allsv	44	10	30	40	34	2	0	1	1	0
2002–03	Linköpings HC	SEL	49	2	8	10	8	—	—	—	—	—
2003–04	Linköpings HC	SEL	50	10	16	26	39	5	0	0	0	4
2004–05	Linköpings HC	SEL	47	3	8	11	14	6	0	0	0	0
2005–06	Linköpings HC	SEL	47	14	13	27	20	11	1	3	4	8
2006–07	Linköpings HC	SEL	54	10	16	26	32	13	2	5	7	4
2007–08	Linköpings HC	SEL	54	5	7	12	6	16	4	2	6	0
2008–09	Djurgårdens IF	SEL	54	4	15	19	22	—	—	—	—	—
2009–10	Djurgårdens IF	SEL	55	7	10	17	22	16	0	5	5	10
2010–11	Djurgårdens IF	SEL	52	5	10	15	16	7	1	0	1	0
2011–12	Djurgårdens IF	SEL	53	4	11	15	10	—	—	—	—	—
2012–13	Djurgårdens IF	Allsv	52	4	14	18	12	6	0	4	4	0
2013–14	Haninge Anchors HC	SWE.4	26	13	37	50	12	8	2	11	13	6
SEL totals			515	64	114	178	189	74	8	15	23	26

=== International ===
Year	Team	Event	GP	G	A	Pts	PIM
1999	Sweden	WJC18	7	3	4	7	2
2000	Sweden	WJC18	6	2	4	6	16
2001	Sweden	WJC	7	0	3	3	2
2002	Sweden	WJC	7	0	2	2	6
Junior totals			27	5	13	18	26
