= Smashed: Story of a Drunken Girlhood =

2005 memoir by Koren Zailckas

- Author: Koren Zailckas
- Language: English
- Genre: Memoir
- Publisher: Viking Press
- Publication date: 2005
- Publication place: United States
- ISBN: 0-670-03376-6

Smashed: Story of a Drunken Girlhood is a memoir written in 2005 by American writer Koren Zailckas and published by Viking Press. The book has spent more than 10 weeks on the New York Times Best Seller list.

== About ==
Smashed chronicles Zailckas' decade-long struggle with alcohol abuse, beginning at fourteen, in an effort to explain the binge drinking phenomenon that plagues America's youth.

Around the time she quit drinking, Zailckas became preoccupied with an old memory, which involved a night that she had her stomach pumped when she was 16. According to Zailckas, she hadn't thought about that night in a number of years, but she suddenly could not get it out of her head. Eventually, she sat down and wrote about it. The piece later became a chapter in her book.

Around the same time, Zailckas was hearing a lot in the news about "girls of her generation" and how they were drinking younger and more than all the generations of women who'd gone before them. The Harvard School of Public Health reported, between 1993 and 2001, there was a threefold increase in the number of women who reported being drunk on ten or more occasions in the previous month. Time (magazine) ran a cover story about female binge drinkers. Zailckas didn't agree with what the psychologists and the sociologists, the clinicians and the statisticians had to say, which was: "girls today are drinking more because they're just so damn liberated, because they're bursting with confidence and girl power, because they believe they can match boys everywhere, including the bar." In her own experience, the author says, she and her female friends drank largely because it was an expression of their unhappiness and lack of confidence. It occurred to Zailckas, then 23, that she could offer a younger perspective. http://yareviews.wikispaces.com/file/view/smashed.jpg/59081286/smashed.jpg

== Movie ==
On July 26, 2006, Zailckas announced on MySpace that film rights to Smashed were sold to Dan Halstead, the producer of Garden State. She wrote the screenplay with her sister.
