= Niklas Anger =

Swedish ice hockey player (born 1977)

- Born: 14 July 1977 (age 48) Stockholm, Sweden
- Height: 6 ft 1 in (185 cm)
- Weight: 194 lb (88 kg; 13 st 12 lb)
- Position: Wing
- Shot: Left
- Played for: Djurgårdens IF; AIK; Brynäs IF; HC Ambri-Piotta; EHC Basel; Timrå IK
- NHL draft: 112th overall, 1995; Montreal Canadiens
- Playing career: 1994–2013

Niklas Anger (born 14 July 1977) was a Swedish professional ice hockey player. He was drafted 112th overall in the 1995 NHL entry draft by the Montreal Canadiens

== Career statistics ==
=== Regular season and playoffs ===
			Regular season					Playoffs
Season	Team	League	GP	G	A	Pts	PIM	GP	G	A	Pts	PIM
1992–93	Djurgårdens IF	J18
1993–94	Djurgårdens IF	J18
1993–94	Djurgårdens IF	SWE U20	2	0	0	0	0	—	—	—	—	—
1994–95	Djurgårdens IF	J20	30	14	12	26	26	—	—	—	—	—
1995–96	Djurgårdens IF	J20	24	13	16	29	26	—	—	—	—	—
1995–96	Djurgårdens IF	SEL	10	0	0	0	2	—	—	—	—	—
1996–97	Djurgårdens IF	J20	2	1	2	3	2	—	—	—	—	—
1996–97	Djurgårdens IF	SEL	4	0	0	0	0	—	—	—	—	—
1996–97	Arlanda HC	SWE.2	16	5	9	14	6	—	—	—	—	—
1996–97	Linköpings HC	SWE.2	10	2	2	4	10	14	3	7	10	2
1997–98	Djurgårdens IF	SEL	45	2	5	7	37	12	0	1	1	2
1998–99	AIK	SEL	47	6	6	12	16	—	—	—	—	—
1999–2000	AIK	SEL	50	11	13	24	14	—	—	—	—	—
2000–01	AIK	SEL	50	5	10	15	22	5	0	1	1	2
2001–02	AIK	SEL	50	12	20	32	16	—	—	—	—	—
2002–03	Brynäs IF	SEL	48	20	12	32	28	—	—	—	—	—
2003–04	Brynäs IF	SEL	50	11	15	26	26	—	—	—	—	—
2004–05	HC Sierre	SUI.2	44	25	60	85	28	14	7	13	20	8
2004–05	HC Ambrì–Piotta	NLA	1	1	1	2	2	—	—	—	—	—
2005–06	EHC Basel	NLA	42	9	28	37	20	5	1	4	5	2
2005–06	HC Sierre	SUI.2	—	—	—	—	—	5	2	0	2	4
2006–07	EHC Basel	NLA	44	9	13	22	30	—	—	—	—	—
2007–08	Djurgårdens IF	SEL	53	9	22	31	26	5	0	3	3	8
2008–09	Djurgårdens IF	SEL	51	23	19	42	16	—	—	—	—	—
2009–10	Timrå IK	SEL	26	2	3	5	0	—	—	—	—	—
2009–10	EHC Basel Sharks	SUI.2	21	6	12	18	14	4	0	2	2	0
2010–11	Alleghe Hockey	ITA	40	8	40	48	26	5	1	1	2	6
2011–12	Almtuna IS	Allsv	46	12	14	26	22	—	—	—	—	—
2012–13	HC Gherdëina	ITA.2	8	4	4	8	4	—	—	—	—	—
SEL totals			484	101	125	226	203	22	0	5	5	12

=== International ===
Year	Team	Event	GP	G	A	Pts	PIM
1995	Sweden	EJC	5	4	4	8	2
1996	Sweden	WJC	7	3	0	3	2
1997	Sweden	WJC	6	5	0	5	2
Junior totals			18	12	4	16	6
