= Timmy Pettersson =

Swedish ice hockey player

- Born: March 15, 1977 (age 48); Gislaved, Sweden
- Height: 6 ft 2 in (188 cm)
- Weight: 192 lb (87 kg; 13 st 10 lb)
- Position: Defenceman
- Shot: Left
- Played for: Severstal Cherepovets (SEL); Västra Frölunda HC (SEL); HV71 (SEL); Södertälje SK (SEL); Djurgårdens IF (SEL)
- Playing career: 1995–2014

Timmy Andreas Pettersson (born March 15, 1977, in Gislaved, Sweden) is a professional Swedish ice hockey player. He is currently a defenseman serving as team captain for Djurgårdens IF Hockey in Hockeyallsvenskan.

== Career statistics ==
			Regular season					Playoffs
Season	Team	League	GP	G	A	Pts	PIM	GP	G	A	Pts	PIM
1994–95	Västra Frölunda HC J20	J20 SuperElit	30	4	9	13	4	—	—	—	—	—
1995–96	Västra Frölunda HC J20	J20 SuperElit	29	10	9	19	18	—	—	—	—	—
1995–96	Västra Frölunda HC	Elitserien	8	0	0	0	0	1	0	0	0	0
1996–97	Västra Frölunda HC J20	J20 SuperElit	18	8	3	11	—	—	—	—	—	—
1996–97	Västra Frölunda HC	Elitserien	37	0	1	1	12	2	0	0	0	0
1997–98	Västra Frölunda HC J20	J20 SuperElit	19	7	7	14	8	—	—	—	—	—
1997–98	Västra Frölunda HC	Elitserien	30	1	0	1	8	7	0	0	0	2
1998–99	Västra Frölunda HC J20	J20 SuperElit	7	1	2	3	6	—	—	—	—	—
1998–99	Västra Frölunda HC	Elitserien	42	2	3	5	14	—	—	—	—	—
1999–00	Västra Frölunda HC	Elitserien	47	4	3	7	8	5	0	1	1	0
2000–01	Västra Frölunda HC	Elitserien	50	6	5	11	54	4	1	0	1	0
2001–02	Västra Frölunda HC	Elitserien	49	7	7	14	32	10	1	3	4	10
2002–03	HV71	Elitserien	50	6	4	10	57	7	1	1	2	4
2003–04	HV71	Elitserien	22	1	1	2	10	—	—	—	—	—
2003–04	Södertälje SK	Elitserien	24	3	5	8	14	—	—	—	—	—
2004–05	Södertälje SK	Elitserien	49	6	8	14	36	10	0	2	2	10
2005–06	Södertälje SK	Elitserien	50	3	3	6	42	—	—	—	—	—
2006–07	Djurgårdens IF	Elitserien	52	7	15	22	62	—	—	—	—	—
2007–08	Djurgårdens IF	Elitserien	54	1	13	14	40	5	1	0	1	4
2008–09	Djurgårdens IF	Elitserien	39	4	7	11	40	—	—	—	—	—
2009–10	Djurgårdens IF	Elitserien	55	4	20	24	46	16	2	7	9	4
2010–11	Severstal Cherepovets	KHL	30	3	8	11	22	—	—	—	—	—
2011–12	ERC Ingolstadt	DEL	41	1	10	11	42	9	0	0	0	8
2012–13	Djurgårdens IF	HockeyAllsvenskan	46	3	8	11	42	6	1	1	2	8
2013–14	Djurgårdens IF	HockeyAllsvenskan	34	2	1	3	18	5	0	0	0	2
2013–14	Djurgårdens IF J20	J20 SuperElit	1	0	0	0	0	—	—	—	—	—
KHL totals			30	3	8	11	22	—	—	—	—	—
Elitserien totals			658	55	95	150	475	67	6	14	20	34
DEL totals			41	1	10	11	42	9	0	0	0	8
