= Andreas Engqvist =

Swedish ice hockey player (born 1987)

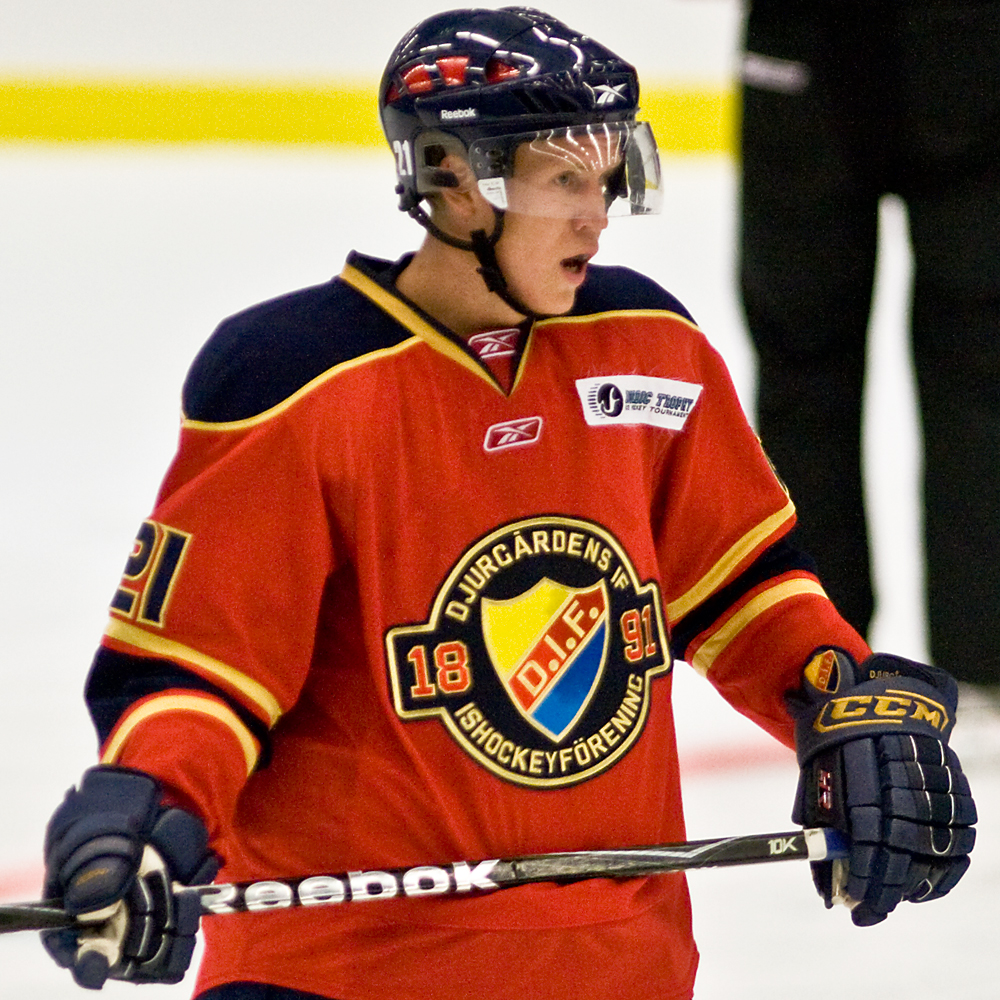
- Born: December 23, 1987 (age 37) Stockholm, Sweden
- Height: 6 ft 3 in (191 cm)
- Weight: 196 lb (89 kg; 14 st 0 lb)
- Position: Centre
- Shot: Right
- Played for: Montreal Canadiens; Atlant Mytishi; CSKA Moscow; Salavat Yulaev Ufa; Djurgårdens IF
- National team: Sweden
- NHL draft: Undrafted
- Playing career: 2005–2019

Andreas Gustaf Engqvist (born December 23, 1987) is a Swedish former professional ice hockey centre who last played with Djurgårdens IF of the SHL, his second tenure with the club. He most recently played for Salavat Yulaev Ufa of the Kontinental Hockey League (KHL).

== Playing career ==
Björn Ericsson, general manager of Järfälla HC, recommended that Djurgården have a look at Engqvist, mentioning that Engqvist reminded him of Mats Sundin.

On July 13, 2009, Engqvist signed a three-year contract with the Montreal Canadiens in the NHL. During the 2009–10 season, he played on loan for Djurgårdens IF in the Swedish Elitserien. On January 21, 2011, he played his first NHL game with the Montreal Canadiens, a 7–1 away win against the Ottawa Senators.

On June 17, 2012, Engvist signed a one-year deal with Atlant Moscow Oblast of the KHL. Having signed as a restricted free agent, the Montreal Canadiens retained his rights. After three seasons in the KHL with Moscow Oblast and HC CSKA Moscow, Engqvist opted to continue with his third KHL club, following a trade to Salavat Yulaev Ufa on June 18, 2015.

In his second season with Salavat in 2016–17, Engqvist appeared in 12 games for 11 points before suffering a season-ending injury on September 22, 2016. Opting to continue his rehabilitation in his native Sweden, he mutually agreed to terminate his contract with the club on December 19, 2016.

During the 2017–18 SHL season, Enqvist signed with Djurgårdens IF.

== International play ==
Medal record

Representing Sweden

Ice hockey

World Championships
Bronze medal – third place	2010 Germany	

Engqvist has played 9 games for Sweden's national ice hockey team at the 2010 World Championships, helping claim the bronze medal.

== Career statistics ==
=== Regular season and playoffs ===
			Regular season					Playoffs
Season	Team	League	GP	G	A	Pts	PIM	GP	G	A	Pts	PIM
2003–04	Spånga Hockey	Div.2	32	4	3	7	0	—	—	—	—	—
2004–05	Spånga Hockey	Div.2	32	12	17	29	12	—	—	—	—	—
2005–06	Djurgårdens IF	SEL	1	0	0	0	0	—	—	—	—	—
2005–06	Djurgårdens IF	J20	36	6	13	19	6	4	1	1	2	2
2006–07	Djurgårdens IF	SEL	43	1	3	4	16	—	—	—	—	—
2006–07	Djurgårdens IF	J20	5	1	3	4	4	7	3	4	7	10
2007–08	Djurgårdens IF	SEL	51	5	7	12	16	5	0	0	0	0
2007–08	Djurgårdens IF	J20	1	1	0	1	1	—	—	—	—	—
2008–09	Djurgårdens IF	SEL	31	9	7	16	12	—	—	—	—	—
2009–10	Djurgårdens IF	SEL	55	14	12	26	30	16	5	8	13	10
2010–11	Hamilton Bulldogs	AHL	71	10	15	25	18	20	4	5	9	0
2010–11	Montreal Canadiens	NHL	3	0	0	0	0	—	—	—	—	—
2011–12	Hamilton Bulldogs	AHL	60	20	23	43	36	—	—	—	—	—
2011–12	Montreal Canadiens	NHL	12	0	0	0	4	—	—	—	—	—
2012–13	Atlant Mytishi	KHL	48	12	24	36	22	4	1	0	1	0
2013–14	Atlant Mytishi	KHL	49	8	10	18	16	—	—	—	—	—
2014–15	Atlant Mytishi	KHL	36	14	12	26	8	—	—	—	—	—
2014–15	CSKA Moscow	KHL	14	3	6	9	0	1	0	0	0	0
2015–16	Salavat Yulaev Ufa	KHL	51	18	16	34	8	15	2	5	7	0
2016–17	Salavat Yulaev Ufa	KHL	12	3	8	11	2	—	—	—	—	—
2017–18	Djurgårdens IF	SHL	27	10	12	22	4	—	—	—	—	—
2018–19	Djurgårdens IF	SHL	2	0	0	0	0	—	—	—	—	—
SHL totals			210	39	41	80	78	21	5	8	13	10
NHL totals			15	0	0	0	4	—	—	—	—	—
KHL totals			210	58	76	134	56	20	3	5	8	0

=== International ===
Year	Team	Event	Result	GP	G	A	Pts	PIM
2010	Sweden	WC	3rd place, bronze medalist(s)	9	1	3	4	6
Senior totals				9	1	3	4	6

== Awards and achievements ==
=== Nordic Trophy ===
- Player of Tournament 2009
