= List of Atlanta Thrashers head coaches =

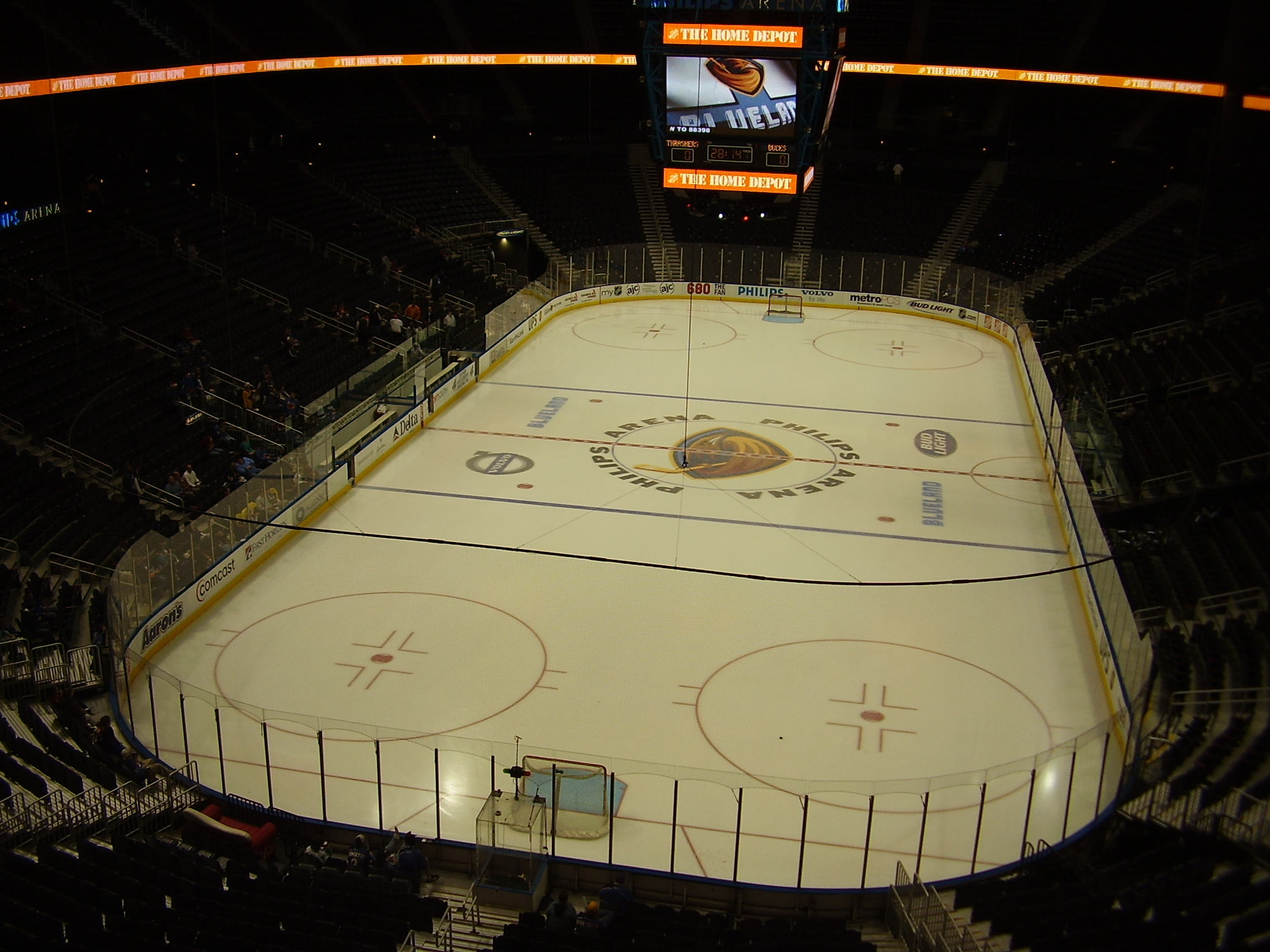
The Thrashers played their home games at the Philips Arena since their inaugural season.

The Atlanta Thrashers were an American professional ice hockey team based in Atlanta, Georgia. They played in the Southeast Division of the Eastern Conference in the National Hockey League (NHL) for its entire history. They moved to Winnipeg, Manitoba in 2011 and became the 2nd Incarnation of the Winnipeg Jets. The team joined the NHL in 1999 as an expansion team. The Thrashers played their home games at the Philips Arena since their inaugural season. The Thrashers were owned by Atlanta Spirit, LLC, and Rick Dudley was their general manager.

There were five Thrashers head coaches during their existence. The team's first head coach was Curt Fraser, who coached for three seasons. Bob Hartley is the franchise's all-time leader for the most regular-season games coached (291), the most regular-season game wins (136), the most regular-season points (309), and the only Thrashers head coach to coach any post-season games (4). All of the Thrashers head coaches except for Hartley have spent their entire NHL head coaching careers with the Thrashers. John Anderson was the head coach of the Thrashers from 2008 to 2010. Craig Ramsay was the last head coach of the Thrashers.

== Key ==
#	Number of coaches^{[a]}
GC	Games coached
W	Wins = 2 points
L	Losses = 0 points
T	Ties = 1 point
OT	Overtime/shootout losses = 1 point^{[b]}
PTS	Points
Win%	Winning percentage
*	Spent entire NHL head coaching career with the Thrashers

== Coaches ==
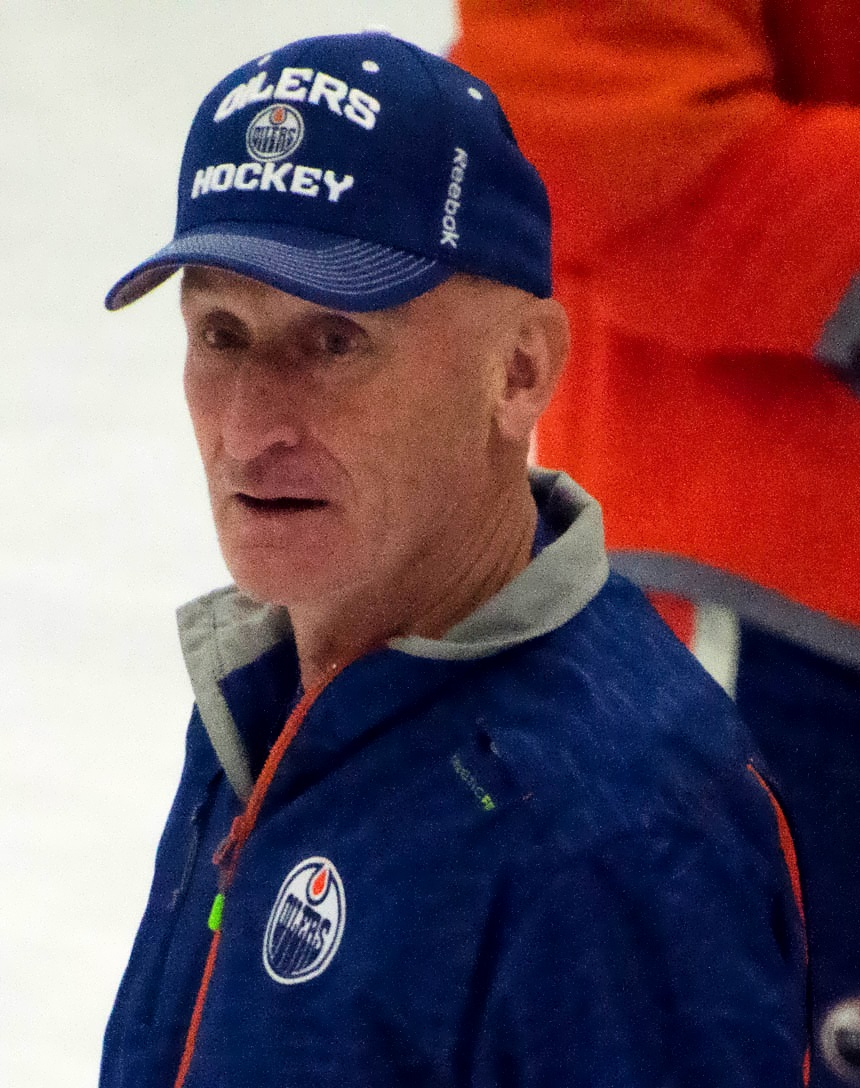
Craig Ramsay, pictured in 2014, was the last head coach of the Thrashers

#	Name	Term^{[c]}	Regular season						Playoffs				Achievements	Reference
#	Name	Term^{[c]}	GC	W	L	T/OT	PTS	Win%	GC	W	L	Win%	Achievements	Reference
1	Curt Fraser*	1999–2002	279	64	169	46	174	.312	—	—	—	—		
2	Don Waddell*	2002–2003	10	4	5	1	9	.450	—	—	—	—		
3	Bob Hartley	2003–2007	291	136	118	37	309	.531	4	0	4	.000		
—	Don Waddell*	2007–2008	76	34	34	8	76	.500	—	—	—	—		
4	John Anderson*	2008–2010	164	70	75	19	159	.482	—	—	—	—		
5	Craig Ramsay	2010–2011	82	34	36	12	80	.488	—	—	—	—		

== Notes ==
- ^{a} A running total of the number of coaches of the Thrashers. Thus, any coach who has two or more separate terms as head coach is only counted once.
- ^{b} Before the 2005–06 season, the NHL instituted a penalty shootout for regular season games that remained tied after a five-minute overtime period, which prevented ties.
- ^{c} Each year is linked to an article about that particular NHL season.
