= Bob Hartley =

Canadian ice hockey coach (born 1960)

- Born: September 7, 1960 (age 66) Hawkesbury, Ontario, Canada
- Current KHL coach: Lokomotiv Yaroslavl
- Coached for: Colorado Avalanche; Atlanta Thrashers; ZSC Lions; Calgary Flames; Avangard Omsk
- Coaching career: 1987–present

Robert Hartley (born September 7, 1960) is a Canadian professional ice hockey coach for Lokomotiv Yaroslavl of the Kontinental Hockey League (KHL). He most recently served as the head coach of Avangard Omsk of the KHL. He has additionally coached the Latvia men's national ice hockey team. He coached the Colorado Avalanche from 1998–2002 and won the Stanley Cup in 2001. He also coached the Atlanta Thrashers from the 2003–04 season up until the beginning of the 2007–08 season, when he was fired after the Thrashers got off to an 0–6 start. Hartley has been an ice hockey analyst for the French-language RDS television channel, and became the head coach of the ZSC Lions of the Swiss National League A in March 2011. From 2012 to 2016, Hartley was the head coach of the Calgary Flames.

== Coaching career ==
=== Early years ===
Hartley began his coaching career with the Hawkesbury Hawks in his hometown of Hawkesbury, Ontario, which he previously played for in junior A. While Hartley was coaching the Hawks, he worked full-time as an assembly line worker at PPG Industries in Hawkesbury. After leading the team twice to a championship, he was hired to coach the Laval Titan of the QMJHL.

=== Laval Titan ===
Hartley's tenure as the Laval Titan head coach was marked with success. He recorded an 81–52–7 record in two seasons with the team. In 1993, during his second season coaching, the team finished first in the Label Division and won the QMJHL championship; the team went on to compete for the Memorial Cup. Laval was eliminated in the semi-final round by the Peterborough Petes and finished with a tournament record of 2-2.

=== American Hockey League (AHL) ===
Following his success coaching Laval, Hartley was hired as an assistant coach for Jacques Martin, who coached the Cornwall Aces in the American Hockey League, the AHL-affiliate of the Quebec Nordiques in the NHL. When Martin was appointed assistant coach of the Quebec Nordiques, Hartley took over as head coach of the Aces and guided the team to two division titles and finished with a record of 72-67-16-5. When the Nordiques relocated to Colorado in 1995 and became the Colorado Avalanche, Hartley was named head coach of the Hershey Bears, the Avalanche's new AHL-affiliate team. Hartley's tenure with the Bears was a success as he guided the team to a Calder Cup title in 1997.

=== Colorado Avalanche ===
Hartley's success with the Bears caught the eye of then-Avalanche general manager Pierre Lacroix, who was looking for a replacement for Marc Crawford, who had suddenly resigned as head coach after a surprising first-round playoff exit. Hartley was hired as the team's second head coach since the relocation to Denver on June 2, 1998. In his first season with the Avalanche, the team got off to a 2–1–6 start, prompting skeptics to question the hiring. When the team caught fire in mid-December, they won their first Northwest Division title and fifth-straight overall. During the 1999 Stanley Cup playoffs, the team defeated the San Jose Sharks in the first round and halted the Detroit Red Wings quest for a three-peat in the second round before bowing to the eventual Stanley Cup champion Dallas Stars in the Western Finals. Hartley's second season saw the team win their sixth consecutive division title along with playoff victories over the Phoenix Coyotes and a rematch with the Red Wings before bowing to the defending champion Dallas in the Western Final for the second consecutive year. Hartley became the first head coach to defeat Scotty Bowman, the Red Wings head coach, in back-to-back playoff best-of-seven series.

Hartley's third season was ultimately his most successful one. Motivated by Ray Bourque's desire to win a Stanley Cup championship, the Avalanche coasted through the league with a 52–16–10–4 record, a seventh consecutive division title, along with the Presidents' Trophy. The playoffs began with a first-round sweep of the eighth seed Vancouver Canucks before enduring a seven-game scare by the Los Angeles Kings in the Western Semi-Finals before taking down the St. Louis Blues in five games, setting up a Stanley Cup Final matchup with the Eastern Conference's top seed, the New Jersey Devils. After falling behind three games to two in the series, the Avalanche rallied back to win the Stanley Cup, accomplishing Bourque's goal and making it the second-straight year the defending champions had lost in the finals, as the Devils themselves defeated the 1999 champion Dallas Stars the year prior.

Another notable milestone from the 2000–01 NHL season for Hartley included coaching the North American All-Star team to a 14–11 victory on home ice. Hartley brought the Stanley Cup to his hometown of Hawkesbury, bringing the trophy to the PPG Industries plant where he worked while also coaching the Hawks. The following season, the team won its eighth consecutive division title and looked sharp in its quest for a second consecutive Stanley Cup. At the start of the playoffs, Hartley became the first head coach since Billy Reay to guide his teams to four consecutive conference final appearances. After two grueling playoff series victories over the Los Angeles Kings and San Jose Sharks, in a repeat of the 1997 Western Finals, the team bowed to the archrival Detroit Red Wings, who would go on to win the Stanley Cup. Hartley's tenure with the Avalanche ended on December 17, 2002, when the team endured a 10–8–9–4 start, and he was replaced by assistant coach Tony Granato. Hartley left the Avalanche franchise with a 193–109–48 regular season record and a 49–31 playoff record. His 193 wins were the most in the Colorado portion of franchise history at the time. He became the only coach in team history to record 40 or more wins during his first four seasons as head coach.

=== Atlanta Thrashers ===
One month after being fired by the Avalanche, Hartley was appointed as the second full-time head coach of the Atlanta Thrashers, who were looking for a replacement after original head coach Curt Fraser was fired following an 8–20–4–1 start on January 15, 2003. Hartley immediately went to work on the team's fortunes. The team went 20–14–5–1 down the stretch and were in the playoff race for the second half of the season, giving hope to Thrasher fans. Hartley's first full season behind the Atlanta bench began with tragedy following the death of Dan Snyder and the loss of Dany Heatley for the majority of the season. The team overcame the adversity and set new franchise records for wins and points in a single season with a 33–37–8–4 record. Under Hartley's guidance, rising star Ilya Kovalchuk became a tri-winner of the Maurice "Rocket" Richard Trophy. Following the 2004–05 NHL lockout, the Thrashers endured yet another slow start and multiple injuries at the goaltending position. After original goaltenders Kari Lehtonen and Mike Dunham were injured, Hartley was forced to use prospects Adam Berkhoel and Michael Garnett along with journeyman Steve Shields, the Thrashers posted the first winning season in franchise history with a 41–33–8 record, but fell short for a playoff appearance after losing out to the Tampa Bay Lightning in the final week of the regular season by two points. The 2006–07 NHL season was one of many accomplishments for the young Thrashers under Hartley's guidance. The team won their first Southeast Division title, setting new franchise records for wins and points with a 43–28–11 record, good enough for 97 points and third seed in the Eastern Conference. The team also clinched its first playoff berth in franchise history and played the New York Rangers in the first round. As of April 16, 2007, Hartley is the all-time winningest coach in franchise history. On October 17, 2007, Hartley was fired and was temporarily replaced by Don Waddell, the general manager at the time. Hartley was under fire because the team had yet to register a point in six regular-season games, was 30th and 27th in the NHL in goals for and against, respectively.

=== ZSC Lions ===
On March 14, 2011, Hartley signed a two-year contract to coach the ZSC Lions, replacing former Sweden national team head coach Bengt-Åke Gustafsson. On April 17, 2012, Hartley led ZSC Lions to a Game 7 upset victory against favourite SC Bern to claim the Swiss championship. Hartley then used his escape clause to return to the NHL and was replaced as Lions head coach by Marc Crawford, the man he had replaced as Avalanche head coach in 1998.

=== Calgary Flames ===
On May 31, 2012, Hartley returned to the NHL as head coach of the Calgary Flames. On June 24, 2015, Hartley won the Jack Adams Award as the NHL's coach of the year. He was the first coach in Flames franchise history to win the award. He was fired on May 3, 2016, less than one year after receiving the award, but achieving a 134–135–25 record and one playoff appearance over his four seasons in Calgary.

=== Latvian national team ===
On December 20, 2016, the Latvian Ice Hockey Federation announced that Hartley agreed to become the head coach of Latvia national team. During the 2021 IIHF World Championship, he led the Latvians to victory in a match against Canada, scoring 2–0. This historical victory marked the first time Latvia won against the superior Canadian men's national ice hockey team.

=== Avangard Omsk ===
On May 27, 2018, he was appointed head coach of Avangard Omsk, playing in the Kontinental Hockey League. He signed a contract with Avangard for a period of two years. He brought the team to the final of the Gagarin Cup, in which the club from Omsk lost in four matches to CSKA Moscow.

On April 28, 2021, while remaining the head coach of Avangard, he won the Gagarin Cup.

=== Lokomotiv Yaroslavl ===
On July 5, 2025, he was appointed head coach of Lokomotiv Yaroslavl in the Kontinental Hockey League and won the Gagarin Cup for the second time, beating Ak Bars Kazan in six matches.

== Personal life ==
Hartley and his wife Micheline have one daughter, Kristine, and one son, Steve.

Despite his anglophone-sounding name, Hartley is a Franco-Ontarian. French is his first language; his English has a marked French accent.

Hartley runs an annual summer hockey camp for kids aged 6–16 in York, Pennsylvania for a week.

== Coaching record ==
League	Team	Year	Regular season							Postseason			
League	Team	Year	G	W	L	T	OTL	Pts	Finish	W	L	Win %	Result
NHL	COL	1998–99	82	44	28	10	0	98	1st in Northwest	11	8	.579	Lost in Conference finals (DAL)
NHL	COL	1999–2000	82	42	28	11	1	96	1st in Northwest	11	6	.647	Lost in Conference finals (DAL)
NHL	COL	2000–01	82	52	16	10	4	118	1st in Northwest	16	7	.696	Won Stanley Cup (NJD)
NHL	COL	2001–02	82	45	28	8	1	99	1st in Northwest	11	10	.524	Lost in Conference finals (DET)
NHL	COL	2002–03	31	10	8	9	4	(105)	(fired)	—	—	—	—
COL total			359	193	108	48	10			49	31	.613	4 playoff appearances 1 Stanley Cup
NHL	ATL	2002–03	39	19	14	5	1	(74)	3rd in Southeast	—	—	—	Missed playoffs
NHL	ATL	2003–04	82	33	37	8	4	78	2nd in Southeast	—	—	—	Missed playoffs
NHL	ATL	2005–06	82	41	33	—	8	90	3rd in Southeast	—	—	—	Missed playoffs
NHL	ATL	2006–07	82	43	28	—	11	97	1st in Southeast	0	4	.000	Lost in Conference quarterfinals (NYR)
NHL	ATL	2007–08	6	0	6	—	0	(76)	(fired)	—	—	—	—
ATL total			291	136	118	13	24			0	4	.000	1 playoff appearance
NLA	ZSC	2011–12	50	24	27	19	4	77	7th in NLA	12	3	.800	Won National League Championship (SCB)
ZSC total			50	24	27	19	4			12	3	.800	1 playoff appearance 1 National League championship
NHL	CGY	2012–13	48	19	25	—	4	42	4th in Northwest	—	—	—	Missed playoffs
NHL	CGY	2013–14	82	35	40	—	7	77	6th in Pacific	—	—	—	Missed playoffs
NHL	CGY	2014–15	82	45	30	—	7	97	3rd in Pacific	5	6	.455	Lost in second round (ANA)
NHL	CGY	2015–16	82	35	40	—	7	77	5th in Pacific	—	—	—	Missed playoffs
CGY total			237	147	65	–	25			5	6	.455	1 playoff appearance
KHL	OMK	2018–19	68	46	16	—	6	98	1st in Kharlamov	12	7	.632	Lost in Finals (CSKA)
KHL	OMK	2019–20	62	37	16	—	9	83	2nd in Chernyshev	2	4	.333	Lost in First round (UFA)
KHL	OMK	2020-21	60	36	16	—	7	84	1st in Chernyshev	16	8	.667	Won Gagarin Cup (CSKA)
KHL	OMK	2021-22	47	28	17	—	2	104	2nd in Chernyshev	7	6	.538	Lost in Second Round (MET)
OMK total			237	147	65	–	24			37	25	.727	4 playoff appearances 1 Gagarin Cup championship
KHL	LOK	2025-26	68	46	16	—	6	98	1st in Tarasov	16	6	.727	Won Gagarin Cup (ABK)
LOK total			68	46	16	–	6			16	6	.727	1 playoff appearance 1 Gagarin Cup
Total			1299	680	469	61	438			119	75	.613	12 playoff appearances 1 Stanley Cup championship 1 Swiss National League Championship 2 Gagarin Cups

== Championships ==
- Gagarin Cup - 2021, 2026
- Stanley Cup – 2001
- Calder Cup – 1997
- NLA champion – 2012
- President's Cup – 1993

== See also ==
- List of NHL head coaches

Preceded by Marc Crawford	Head coach of the Colorado Avalanche; 1998–2003	Succeeded by Tony Granato
Preceded by Don Waddell	Head coach of the Atlanta Thrashers; 2003–2007	Succeeded by Don Waddell
Preceded by Brent Sutter	Head coach of the Calgary Flames; 2012–2016	Succeeded by Glen Gulutzan
Preceded by Haralds Vasiļjevs	Latvian national ice hockey team coach 2016–2021	Succeeded by Harijs Vītoliņš
