= 2010–11 NHL suspensions and fines =

The following is a list of all suspensions and fines enforced in the National Hockey League during the 2010–11 NHL season. It lists which players or coaches of what team have been punished for which offense and the punishment, in the monetary sense of the word, they received.

== Suspensions ==
Date	Name	Team	Offense	Length
September 24, 2010	Nick Boynton	Chicago Blackhawks	Throat-slashing gesture.	1 game
October 4, 2010	Michael Cammalleri	Montreal Canadiens	Slashing Nino Niederreiter.	1 game
October 10, 2010	Pierre-Luc Letourneau-Leblond	New Jersey Devils	Automatic suspension due to instigator penalty in the last five minutes of a game.	1 game
October 12, 2010	James Wisniewski	New York Islanders	Obscene gesture towards Sean Avery.	2 games
October 12, 2010	Niklas Hjalmarsson	Chicago Blackhawks	Boarding Jason Pominville.	2 games
October 18, 2010	Shane Doan	Phoenix Coyotes	Blindside hit to the head of Dan Sexton.	3 games
October 22, 2010	Rick Rypien	Vancouver Canucks	Grabbing a Minnesota Wild fan.	6 games
October 27, 2010	Stephane Robidas	Dallas Stars	Automatic suspension for two game misconducts for boarding within 41 games of another.	1 game
November 1, 2010	Daniel Briere	Philadelphia Flyers	Cross-check to the head of Frans Nielsen.	3 games
November 5, 2010	Joe Thornton	San Jose Sharks	Blindside hit to the head of David Perron.	2 games
November 13, 2010	Brent Burns	Minnesota Wild	Butt-ending Steve Bernier in the face.	2 games
November 18, 2010	Mattias Ritola	Tampa Bay Lightning	Charging/boarding Matt Moulson.	2 games
November 18, 2010	Olli Jokinen	Calgary Flames	Cross-check to the head of Wojtek Wolski.	3 games
December 13, 2010	Jody Shelley	Philadelphia Flyers	Boarding Adam McQuaid.	2 games
December 19, 2010	Matt Martin	New York Islanders	Blindside hit to the head of Vernon Fiddler.	2 games
December 29, 2010	Jody Shelley	Philadelphia Flyers	Sucker-punch on Andrew Alberts.	2 games
January 8, 2011	Ben Eager	Atlanta Thrashers	Sucker-punch on Colby Armstrong.	4 games
January 9, 2011	Tom Kostopoulos	Calgary Flames	Hit to the head of Brad Stuart.	6 games
January 14, 2011	Shane O'Brien	Nashville Predators	High-stick on Stephen Weiss.	2 games
January 14, 2011	Mike Brown	Toronto Maple Leafs	Blindside hit to the head of Ed Jovanovski.	3 games
January 18, 2011	Scott Nichol	San Jose Sharks	Elbowing David Schlemko in the head.	4 games
February 4, 2011	Daniel Paille	Boston Bruins	Blindside hit to the head of Raymond Sawada.	4 games
February 9, 2011	Anton Volchenkov	New Jersey Devils	Elbowing Zach Boychuk in the head.	3 games
February 9, 2011	Matt Cooke	Pittsburgh Penguins	Charging and boarding Fedor Tyutin.	4 games
February 12, 2011	Eric Godard	Pittsburgh Penguins	Automatic suspension for leaving the bench to engage in an altercation.	10 games
February 12, 2011	Matt Martin	New York Islanders	Sucker punching Maxime Talbot.	4 games
February 12, 2011	Trevor Gillies	New York Islanders	Elbowing in the head, punching and taunting Eric Tangradi.	9 games
February 23, 2011	Scottie Upshall	Phoenix Coyotes	Boarding Oskars Bartulis.	2 games
March 4, 2011	Trevor Gillies	New York Islanders	Boarding check to the head of Cal Clutterbuck.	10 games
March 10, 2011	Pavel Kubina	Tampa Bay Lightning	Elbowing Dave Bolland in the head.	3 games
March 16, 2011	Dany Heatley	San Jose Sharks	Elbowing Steve Ott in the head.	2 games
March 17, 2011	Brad Marchand	Boston Bruins	Elbowing R. J. Umberger in the head.	2 games
March 21, 2011	Matt Cooke	Pittsburgh Penguins	Elbowing Ryan McDonagh in the head.	10 games and the first round of the playoffs (ended being a total of 17 games)
April 7, 2011	Raffi Torres	Vancouver Canucks	Elbowing Jordan Eberle in the head.	2 games and 2 games of the first round of the playoffs
April 15, 2011	Jarret Stoll	Los Angeles Kings	Boarding Ian White.	1 game
April 16, 2011	Bobby Ryan	Anaheim Ducks	Stomping Jonathon Blum.	2 games
April 21, 2011	Jarkko Ruutu	Anaheim Ducks	Late hit on Martin Erat.	1 game
June 7, 2011	Aaron Rome	Vancouver Canucks	Late hit on Nathan Horton.	4 games

== Fines ==
Date	Name	Team	Offense	Amount
October 10, 2010	John MacLean	New Jersey Devils (head coach)	Automatic fine because a player received an instigator penalty during the last five minutes of a game.	$10,000 U.S.
October 15, 2010	Nick Foligno	Ottawa Senators	Blindside hit to the head of Pat Dwyer.	$2,500 U.S.
October 17, 2010	Patrick Kaleta	Buffalo Sabres	Attempted head butt on Travis Zajac.	Undisclosed
October 18, 2010	Tom Gilbert	Edmonton Oilers	Blindside hit to the head of Matt Stajan.	$2,500 U.S.
October 22, 2010	Team	Vancouver Canucks	Fined in the wake of Rick Rypien's suspension.	$25,000 U.S.
October 25, 2010	Rick Nash	Columbus Blue Jackets	High-sticking Mark Giordano.	$2,500 U.S.
November 15, 2010	Brandon Dubinsky	New York Rangers	Grabbing Colin Fraser from the bench.	$1,000 U.S.
December 3, 2010	Curtis Glencross	Calgary Flames	Cross-check to the head of Keith Ballard.	Undisclosed
December 11, 2010	Alexander Semin	Washington Capitals	Cross-check to the head of John-Michael Liles.	Undisclosed
December 26, 2010	Milan Lucic	Boston Bruins	Sucker punch on Freddy Meyer.	$3,500 U.S.
January 13, 2011	Team	Toronto Maple Leafs	Head coach Ron Wilson violated the CBA by posting a bounty for his 600th win.	Undisclosed
January 17, 2011	Daniel Briere	Philadelphia Flyers	Punching at Brandon Prust from the bench.	$1,000 U.S.
January 20, 2011	Curtis Glencross	Calgary Flames	Boarding Clayton Stoner.	$2,500 U.S.
January 21, 2011	Dean Lombardi	Los Angeles Kings (general manager)	Derisive comments insinuating Mike Murphy was manipulating video review to disfavor the Kings.	$50,000 U.S.
February 12, 2011	Team	New York Islanders	Team conduct in the Islanders' February 12 game against the Pittsburgh Penguins.	$100,000 U.S.
March 18, 2011	Patric Hornqvist	Nashville Predators	Elbow to head of Tyler Seguin.	$2,500 U.S.
April 27, 2011	Mike Gillis	Vancouver Canucks	Complaints about officiating in the Canucks-Blackhawks playoff series.	Undisclosed
May 29, 2011	Nathan Horton	Boston Bruins	Throwing a water bottle at Tampa Bay Lightning fans following Game 6 of the Eastern Conference Finals.	$2,500 U.S.

== See also ==
- 2010–11 NHL transactions
- 2010 NHL entry draft
- 2010 in sports
- 2011 in sports
- List of 2010–11 NHL Three Star Awards
