= Dan Kamal =

American journalist (born 1951)

Dan Kamal (born 1951) is the former play-by-play announcer for the Atlanta Thrashers. He served as the team's voice prior to their move to Winnipeg for the 2011–12 NHL season.

== Broadcasting career ==
Dan Kamal was the play-by-play voice for all Thrashers radio broadcasts and oversaw radio operations for the Thrashers. He had been partnered with Billy Jaffe and former Thrasher Jeff Odgers.

As Senior Director of Radio Operations, he was responsible for programming, production and distribution of Thrashers broadcasts for the team's radio network, which included flagship station WCNN "680, The Fan" and affiliates in Georgia, Alabama and South Carolina. In addition to his radio duties, Kamal was a regular contributor to the team's official web site, providing interviews and editorial content.

Kamal joined the Thrashers prior to their 1999–2000 inaugural season and his role with the team marks the second time he has broadcast professional hockey in Atlanta. He is the former radio and television play-by-play announcer for the Atlanta Knights of the former International Hockey League, a position he held from 1994 to 1996. Prior to the Knights, he was the radio and TV play-by-play voice of the Hershey Bears of the American Hockey League from 1984 to 1994. Dan was also the radio play-by-play voice of the Harrisburg Senators of minor league baseball's AA Eastern League from its inaugural, modern-day season in 1987 until the mid-1990s.

Following the Knights, Kamal joined Turner Broadcasting System, Inc., in 1997 as a writer and field producer for the former CNN/Sports Illustrated cable network. While with the network, he also served as a fill-in anchor on CNN Headline Sports. During the 2004–2005 NHL lockout, he returned to Turner Broadcasting as a freelance reporter/editor for the CNN Radio Network. He also served as a speaker for the Atlanta Hawks Read to Achieve program that reached 122 schools and 61,000 students.

As of 2012, Kamal worked for CNN as a part-time news writer. On January 8, 2013, the Columbus Dispatch reported (and Kamal himself confirmed via Twitter) that he has been hired by Fox Sports Ohio and the Columbus Blue Jackets as their in-studio pre- and post-game host.

In his broadcasting career Kamal also has covered the 1996 Summer Olympic Games for Atlanta's WGST Radio and has served as studio host for the Atlanta Falcons Radio Network and PGA Tour Radio.

== Personal ==
Kamal earned a bachelor's degree in communication studies from the University of Massachusetts Amherst, where he also worked on the school's radio station, WMUA and a master's degree in communications from Boston University.
