= Jeff Odgers =

Canadian ice hockey player (born 1969)

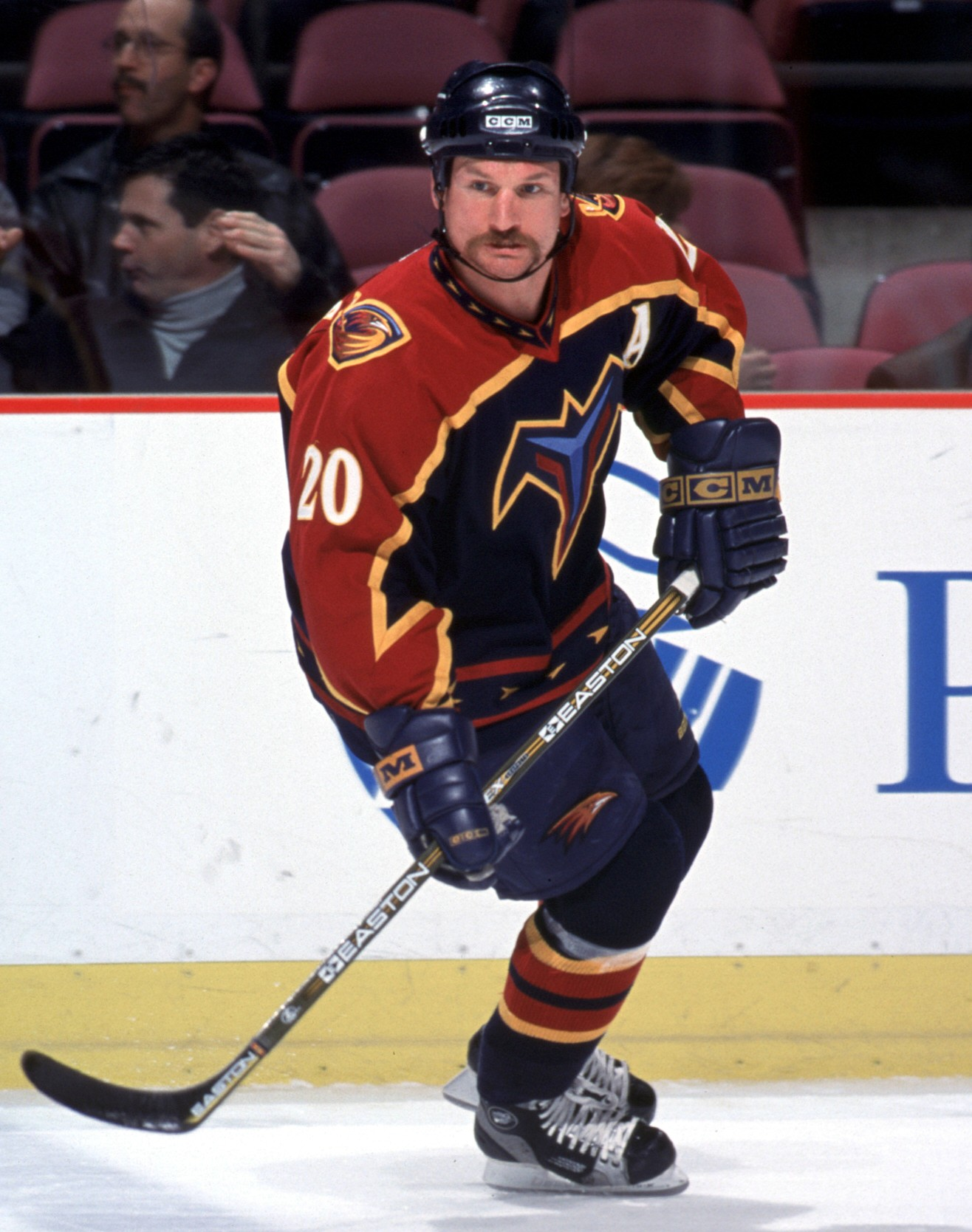
- Odgers with the Atlanta Thrashers
- Born: May 31, 1969 (age 57) Spy Hill, Saskatchewan, Canada
- Height: 6 ft 0 in (183 cm)
- Weight: 200 lb (91 kg; 14 st 4 lb)
- Position: Right wing
- Shot: Right
- Played for: San Jose Sharks; Boston Bruins; Colorado Avalanche; Atlanta Thrashers
- NHL draft: Undrafted
- Playing career: 1990–2003

John Jeffrey Odgers (born May 31, 1969) is a Canadian former professional ice hockey player who played over 800 games in the National Hockey League for the San Jose Sharks, Boston Bruins, Colorado Avalanche and the Atlanta Thrashers. Mainly an enforcer, Odgers compiled a total of 2,364 penalty minutes in 821 regular season games. He also scored 75 goals and 70 assists for 145 points. Odgers served as captain of the San Jose Sharks for the latter half of the 1994–95 season and the entire 1995–96 season. He was also known for his mustache while with the Colorado Avalanche and the Atlanta Thrashers.

== Playing career ==
Odgers was undrafted by any NHL team. He attended a developmental tryout camp on the invitation of Chuck Grillo and was then invited to pre-season camp with the Minnesota North Stars. Though unsigned by the North Stars, Odgers received a personal services contract with the San Jose Sharks and was assigned to the Kansas City Blades of the IHL. Odgers played 61 games in the San Jose Sharks' inaugural season. Odgers led the Sharks with most penalty minutes (since broken). He would later be the captain of the Sharks in 1994-95 until 1996, when he joined the Boston Bruins in a trade that sent him and 1996 5th round pick to Boston in exchange for Al Iafrate. After one season with Boston, Odgers would sign as a free agent with the Colorado Avalanche, Where he would remain until he was selected from the team by the Minnesota Wild in the 2000 Expansion Draft. Odgers wouldn't end up playing a game with Minnesota before the season began as he was left unprotected for the 2000 NHL Waiver Draft and claimed by the Atlanta Thrashers on September 29, 2000. Odgers is the Sharks’ all-time leader in penalty minutes with 1,001, The Avalanches’ single season leader in penalty minutes with 259, which he achieved during the 1998-99 season, The Avalanches’ all time leader in fighting majors at 73, and remains the Thrashers/Jets' single season leader in penalty minutes, which he set in the 2000-01 season.

In September 2006, Odgers served as color commentator for an Atlanta Thrashers pre-season game. It was believed to be an on-air tryout alongside longtime Thrashers announcer Dan Kamal to replace Billy Jaffe, who had joined the New York Islanders. Odgers got the job, and served as the color commentator with Kamal on Atlanta AM radio station 680 The Fan for two seasons. At the beginning of the 2008-09 season it was announced that he would not return because he wanted to spend more time with his family.

Odgers spent the 2008-09 season as a trainer for his son John's team, the Yorkton Midget Kinsmen Terriers of the South Saskatchewan Minor Hockey League (SSMHL). For the 2009-10 season Odgers coached the Bantam AA Yorkton Terriers of the SSMHL. Another son, Dakota, was a member of that squad. Odgers currently plays senior hockey for the Rocanville Tigers of the Triangle Hockey League.

Outside hockey, Odgers manages his family farm as well as conducts safety training at the Mosaic K3 Mine Site in Esterhazy, Saskatchewan.

== Career statistics ==
| | | | Regular season | | | | | Playoffs |
| Season | Team | League | GP | G | A | Pts | PIM | GP | G | A | Pts | PIM |
|---|---|---|---|---|---|---|---|---|---|---|---|---|
| 1986–87 | Brandon Wheat Kings | WHL | 70 | 7 | 14 | 21 | 150 | — | — | — | — | — |
| 1987–88 | Brandon Wheat Kings | WHL | 70 | 17 | 18 | 35 | 202 | 4 | 1 | 1 | 2 | 14 |
| 1988–89 | Brandon Wheat Kings | WHL | 71 | 31 | 29 | 60 | 277 | — | — | — | — | — |
| 1989–90 | Brandon Wheat Kings | WHL | 64 | 37 | 28 | 65 | 209 | — | — | — | — | — |
| 1990–91 | Kansas City Blades | IHL | 77 | 12 | 19 | 31 | 318 | — | — | — | — | — |
| 1991–92 | Kansas City Blades | IHL | 12 | 2 | 2 | 4 | 56 | 9 | 3 | 0 | 3 | 13 |
| 1991–92 | San Jose Sharks | NHL | 61 | 7 | 4 | 11 | 217 | — | — | — | — | — |
| 1992–93 | San Jose Sharks | NHL | 66 | 12 | 15 | 27 | 253 | — | — | — | — | — |
| 1993–94 | San Jose Sharks | NHL | 81 | 13 | 8 | 21 | 222 | 11 | 0 | 0 | 0 | 11 |
| 1994–95 | San Jose Sharks | NHL | 48 | 4 | 3 | 7 | 117 | 11 | 1 | 1 | 2 | 23 |
| 1995–96 | San Jose Sharks | NHL | 78 | 12 | 4 | 16 | 192 | — | — | — | — | — |
| 1996–97 | Boston Bruins | NHL | 80 | 7 | 8 | 15 | 197 | — | — | — | — | — |
| 1997–98 | Providence Bruins | AHL | 4 | 0 | 0 | 0 | 31 | — | — | — | — | — |
| 1997–98 | Colorado Avalanche | NHL | 68 | 5 | 8 | 13 | 213 | 6 | 0 | 0 | 0 | 25 |
| 1998–99 | Colorado Avalanche | NHL | 75 | 2 | 3 | 5 | 259 | 15 | 1 | 0 | 1 | 14 |
| 1999–2000 | Colorado Avalanche | NHL | 62 | 1 | 2 | 3 | 162 | 4 | 0 | 0 | 0 | 0 |
| 2000–01 | Atlanta Thrashers | NHL | 82 | 6 | 7 | 13 | 226 | — | — | — | — | — |
| 2001–02 | Atlanta Thrashers | NHL | 46 | 4 | 4 | 8 | 135 | — | — | — | — | — |
| 2002–03 | Atlanta Thrashers | NHL | 74 | 2 | 4 | 6 | 171 | — | — | — | — | — |
| NHL totals | | | 821 | 75 | 70 | 145 | 2,364 | 47 | 2 | 1 | 3 | 73 |

== See also ==
- List of NHL players with 2000 career penalty minutes

| Preceded by Bob Errey | San Jose Sharks captain 1995–96 | Succeeded by Todd Gill |
