= 2010–11 NHL season =

National Hockey League season

- League: National Hockey League
- Sport: Ice hockey
- Duration: October 7, 2010 – June 15, 2011
- Games: 82
- Teams: 30
- TV partner(s): CBC, TSN, RDS (Canada); Versus, NBC (United States)

Draft
- Top draft pick: Taylor Hall
- Picked by: Edmonton Oilers

Regular season
- Presidents' Trophy: Vancouver Canucks
- Season MVP: Corey Perry (Ducks)
- Top scorer: Daniel Sedin (Canucks)

Playoffs
- Playoffs MVP: Tim Thomas (Bruins)

Stanley Cup
- Champions: Boston Bruins
- Runners-up: Vancouver Canucks

NHL seasons
- 2009–10 2011–12

The 2010–11 NHL season was the 94th season of operation (93rd season of play) of the National Hockey League (NHL). The Boston Bruins defeated the Vancouver Canucks in the Stanley Cup Final four games to three, being the sixth Cup win in Bruins' franchise history. For the fourth consecutive season, the season started with games in Europe. The 58th All-Star Game was held at RBC Center in Raleigh, North Carolina, home arena of the Carolina Hurricanes, on January 30, 2011.

This was the final season of operation for the Atlanta Thrashers, who were sold to True North Sports and Entertainment out of Winnipeg, Manitoba, and moved from Atlanta to Winnipeg to become the "new" Winnipeg Jets. Winnipeg had lost its previous NHL team, also called the Winnipeg Jets, after the 1995–96 NHL season to Phoenix, Arizona, and were renamed "Phoenix Coyotes." This was the second time the city of Atlanta lost an NHL franchise, having previously lost the Atlanta Flames to Calgary, Alberta after the 1979–80 season.

== League business ==
=== Salary cap ===
On June 23, 2010, the NHL announced that the salary cap would be increased by US$2.6 million. As a result, the new salary cap ceiling is set at US$59.4 million, while the salary cap floor is US$43.4 million.

=== Entry draft ===
The 2010 NHL entry draft took place on June 25–26, 2010, at the Staples Center in Los Angeles, home arena of the Los Angeles Kings. Taylor Hall was selected first overall in the draft by the Edmonton Oilers, Tyler Seguin was picked second by the Boston Bruins and Erik Gudbranson was chosen third by the Florida Panthers.

=== Franchise sales ===
Tom Golisano, Larry Quinn and Daniel DiPofi, owners of the Buffalo Sabres, sold their franchise to Terrence Pegula during the course of the 2010–11 season. The league approved the sale February 18, 2011.

=== Rule changes ===
==== Tie-breaking procedure ====
Prior to the 2010–11 season, the first tie-breaker to separate teams with equal number of points in a conference was the number of games won, no matter how the wins were obtained. Starting in the 2010–11 season, the league made a modification to this rule, stating that the greater number of games won, excluding wins obtained in the shootout, will be ranked higher. The change was made to reward in-play team victories (regulation or overtime) instead of a win obtained via an individual skill contest. This figure will be tracked in an additional column in the official league standings called ROW (Regulation and overtime wins). In its first year, the tie-breaker proved critical, giving the 106-point, 47-win (44-ROW) Philadelphia Flyers the Atlantic Division title over the 106-point, 49-win (39-ROW) Pittsburgh Penguins, who were seeded fourth rather than second based on the new rule.

==== Illegal hits to the head ====
Prior to the 2010–11 season, the Board of Governors, General Managers and the Competition Committee unanimously agreed to implement a new penalty. An illegal hit to the head is a lateral or blind side hit to an opponent where the head is targeted and/or is the principal point of contact is not permitted. Any player who incurs a total of two game misconducts under this rule shall be suspended automatically for the next game his team plays. For each subsequent game misconduct penalty, the automatic suspension shall be increased by one game. The commissioner of the league can increase the suspension longer due to his discretion.

== Arena changes ==
- The Calgary Flames' home arena, Pengrowth Saddledome, was renamed Scotiabank Saddledome as part of a new naming rights agreement with Scotiabank.
- The Philadelphia Flyers's home arena, the Wachovia Center, was renamed the Wells Fargo Center after Wells Fargo acquired Wachovia.
- The Pittsburgh Penguins moved from Mellon Arena to Consol Energy Center, with Consol Energy purchasing the naming rights. The Penguins had played at Mellon Arena, also known as "The Igloo", where the Penguins had played since their inception in 1967.
- The Vancouver Canucks' home arena, General Motors Place, was renamed Rogers Arena as part of a new naming rights agreement with Rogers Communications.

== Uniforms ==
Several teams announced plans to change their uniforms in the 2010–11 season.

The Buffalo Sabres, as part of their 40th anniversary season, reverted to the classic crossed swords insignia (replacing the infamous "Buffaslug" logo) and a slightly updated uniform based upon the style they wore from 1970 through 1996, when they left Buffalo Memorial Auditorium and moved down the street to the HSBC Arena with blue and gold trim. The blue version was previously their third jersey for the past three seasons. A new third jersey, also in blue, featured the city's name in white script on the chest, along with "quilted" numbers on the back and a gold nameplate with blue lettering fashioning the look of the AHL's former Buffalo Bisons.

The Columbus Blue Jackets unveiled a third jersey November 24 as part of their 10th season celebration. The new jersey made its debut on November 26 when the Blue Jackets hosted the Detroit Red Wings.

The Philadelphia Flyers adopted their 2010 NHL Winter Classic white uniforms as their new road uniform and dropped the black third jersey they wore since changing to Reebok's "NHL Edge" template.

The New York Islanders reverted to the uniforms they made their debut back in 1972–73; their royal blue uniforms were their third jersey for the past two seasons. The road white uniforms are also from the 1972–73 season.

The New York Rangers inaugurated a new third jersey. The jersey resembled the one worn by the team in its early years, notably during their Stanley Cup championship years of 1928 and 1933, but with "NEW YORK" across the jersey, instead of "RANGERS."

The Toronto Maple Leafs unveiled new home and road jerseys on June 14, 2010, seeing the return of the horizontal stripes on the bottom of the jersey and the "veined leaf" logo on both shoulders. The jersey also includes a white collar with string lace-up instead of a V-shaped collar.

In third jersey items, the Calgary Flames used the third jerseys they debuted in the 2009–10 season onto the Edge template in a retro style from the 1988–89 season. After a three-year hiatus, the Anaheim Ducks unveiled a new third jersey on November 26 against the Chicago Blackhawks. The Los Angeles Kings added a throwback purple and gold uniform, with the original 1967 style of purple, gold and white crown graphic on the jersey front for up to four games, and the Dallas Stars swapped designations on their two white jerseys. The Vancouver Canucks, like the Sabres, were celebrating their 40th anniversary and wore replicas of their original 1970–71 white jerseys for several home games as well. Despite the league rules stating that all team jerseys must have nameplates on the back, both the Canucks and Kings were granted permission to wear jerseys without nameplates. The Washington Capitals, the road team in the 2011 Winter Classic, wore their Winter Classic jerseys in a home game vs. the Montreal Canadiens in honor of former Capital Dino Ciccarelli and his 2010 induction to the Hockey Hall of Fame.

== Pre-season ==
=== 2010 Kraft Hockeyville ===
Every year since 2006, Kraft Foods has sponsored a contest called Kraft Hockeyville, where small Canadian towns compete against each other for the title of Hockeyville. The winning town also gets to host an NHL preseason game in a local arena, as well as hosting an event called the 'Stanley Cup Jamboree'. Dundas, Ontario, a suburb of Hamilton (which itself has been the subject of numerous efforts at potential National Hockey League expansion) won the 2010 contest, and hosted the pre-season game between the Ottawa Senators and the Buffalo Sabres on September 28, 2010.

=== European exhibition games ===
The six teams going to Europe to open their regular seasons there as part of the NHL Premiere games also played exhibition games against European teams under the banner of NHL Premiere Challenge to close out their pre-seasons, finishing with a 6–1–0 record.

Date	Venue	European team	NHL team	Score
October 2	SAP Arena, Mannheim	(Germany) Adler	Sharks	2–3 (SO)
October 2	The Odyssey, Belfast	(United Kingdom) Giants Select	Bruins	1–5
October 4	Ice Palace, Saint Petersburg	(Russia) SKA	Hurricanes	5–3
October 4	Tampereen jäähalli, Tampere	(Finland) Ilves	Wild	1–5
October 5	Tipsport Arena, Liberec	(Czech Republic) Bílí Tygři	Bruins	1–7
October 5	Malmö Arena, Malmö	(Sweden) Redhawks	Blue Jackets	1–4
October 6	Arena Riga, Riga	(Latvia) Dinamo	Coyotes	1–3

== Regular season ==
=== Premiere games ===
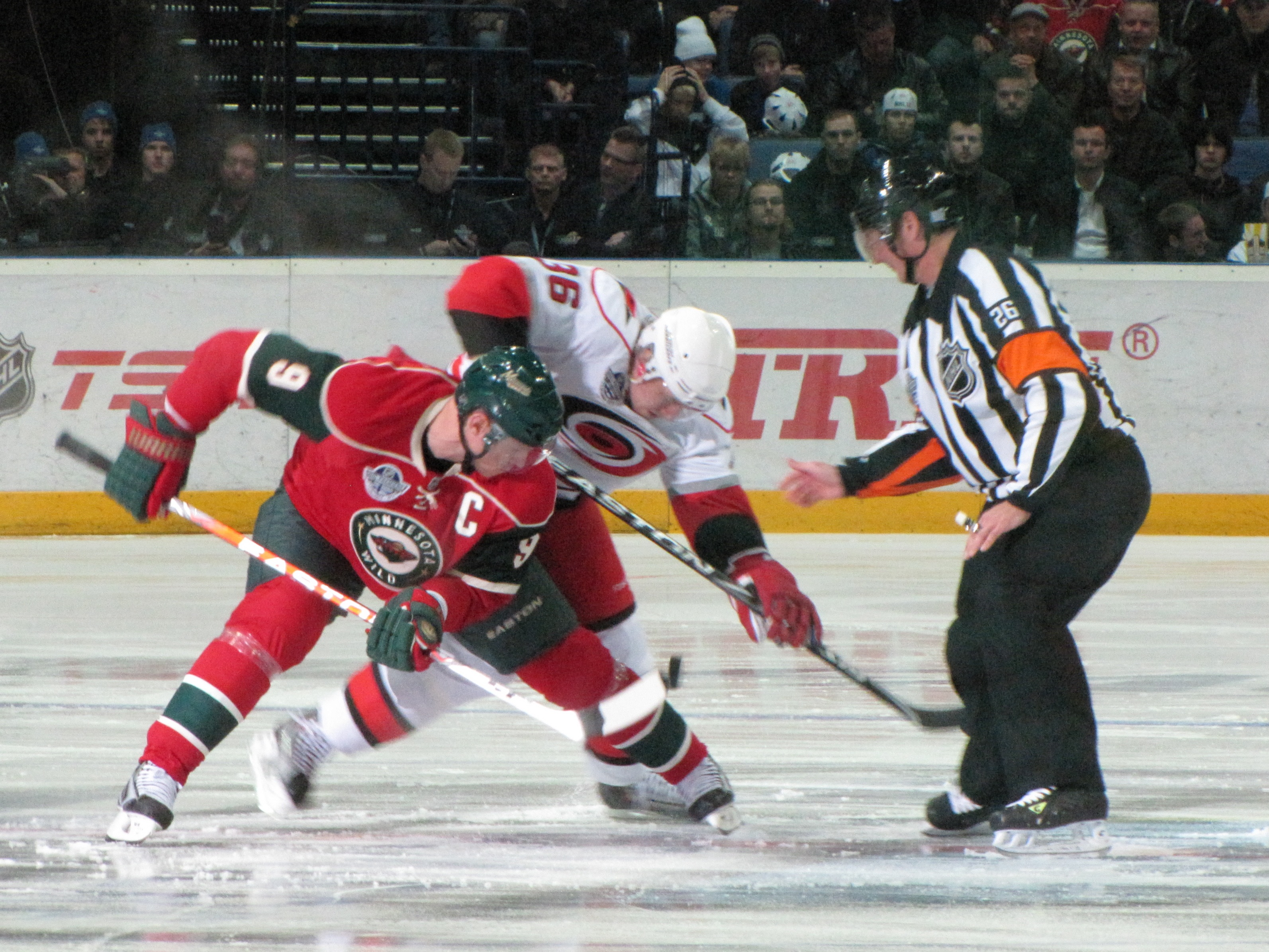
The first face off of the season, Hurricanes at Wild in Helsinki, Finland.

A record six teams opened the regular season in Europe, in a series branded the "2010 Compuware NHL Premiere Games." On October 7–8, 2010, the Carolina Hurricanes and the Minnesota Wild played two games at the Hartwall Areena in Helsinki, Finland. The Hurricanes swept the Wild. On October 8–9, 2010, the Columbus Blue Jackets and the San Jose Sharks played two games at the Ericsson Globe in Stockholm, Sweden. The two teams split a two-game premiere. On October 9–10, 2010, the Boston Bruins and the Phoenix Coyotes played two games at the O2 Arena in Prague, Czech Republic. The two teams also split a two-game premiere.

The first Premiere Games goal was scored by Minnesota Wild forward Guillaume Latendresse.

=== NHL face-off ===
The regular season also began in North America on October 7 with four additional games. In Canada, CBC's Hockey Night in Canada broadcast a double header featuring four Canadian teams. The first game saw the eastern Canadian Original Six-era rivalry rekindled, with the Toronto Maple Leafs hosting the Montreal Canadiens. This game was followed by the Battle of Alberta when the Calgary Flames visited the Edmonton Oilers. In the United States, both 2010 Stanley Cup finalists were in action as well on Versus. Besides the previously mentioned Philadelphia Flyers-Pittsburgh Penguins game to open Consol Energy Center, the Stanley Cup champion Chicago Blackhawks played against the Colorado Avalanche at Pepsi Center in the nightcap. The Blackhawks had their home opener two nights later against their Central Division rivals, the Detroit Red Wings, and hoisted their first Stanley Cup championship banner in 49 years in a pre-game ceremony.

The first NHL Face-off games goal was scored by Tim Brent of the Toronto Maple Leafs.

=== Outdoor games ===
==== 2011 Winter Classic ====
The Pittsburgh Penguins hosted the 2011 Bridgestone NHL Winter Classic playing the Washington Capitals at Heinz Field on January 1, 2011. The game was telecast on NBC in the USA and on CBC and RDS in Canada. The Washington Capitals won the game 3–1. The game was originally scheduled to be played at 1 pm. However, rain in Pittsburgh forced the NHL to move the game by seven hours into prime-time at 8 pm.

==== The Heritage Classic returns ====
A second outdoor game, the 2011 NHL Heritage Classic, was held in Canada at McMahon Stadium in Calgary, Alberta, on February 20, 2011, between the Calgary Flames and the Montreal Canadiens. CBC, RDS and Versus telecasted the game. This was the second outdoor game held in Canada following the Heritage Classic in 2003 when the Montreal Canadiens defeated the Edmonton Oilers 4–3 at Commonwealth Stadium in Edmonton, Alberta. The Heritage classic resulted in the Flames defeating the Canadiens 4–0. This event was recorded as the first shutout in any NHL outdoor game.

=== All-Star Game ===
The All-Star Game was played on January 30, 2011, at the RBC Center in Raleigh, North Carolina, the home of the Carolina Hurricanes. A new format to select the teams were introduced: instead of using conferences or player nationalities as in past All-Star Games, teams were selected by captains in a fantasy draft days prior to the game.

=== Hockey Days ===
==== Canada ====
CBC hosted its 11th annual Hockey Day in Canada event on February 12, 2011, in Whitehorse, Yukon. The network broadcast a triple header of games featuring all six Canadian teams. The Edmonton Oilers hosted the Ottawa Senators, the Toronto Maple Leafs visited the Montreal Canadiens and the Vancouver Canucks welcomed the Calgary Flames.

==== United States ====
For the first time ever, the NHL and NBC hosted a Hockey Day in America event on February 20, 2011, featuring eight of the most popular American NHL teams. The Philadelphia Flyers defeated the New York Rangers 4–2, the Washington Capitals defeated the Buffalo Sabres 2–1, the Red Wings defeated the Minnesota Wild 2–1, and the highlight game of the afternoon, a meeting of the last two Stanley Cup champions, as the Penguins were defeated by the Blackhawks 3–2. The event was part of the broader Hockey Weekend Across America organized by USA Hockey.

=== Highlights ===
On October 30, 2010, four penalty shot goals were scored on one night for the first time in league history. David Booth, Frans Nielsen, Ryan Callahan and Dave Steckel were the scorers. The previous record was three penalty shot goals in one night. Four penalty shot attempts in one night had occurred previously.

On November 20, 2010, the 50,000th game in the NHL's history was played, counting all regular season and playoff games, going back to the league's inaugural season in 1917.

== Standings ==
The Vancouver Canucks placed first overall, winning the Presidents' Trophy and home-ice advantage throughout the playoffs. The Washington Capitals placed first in the Eastern Conference, earning home-ice advantage in the Eastern Conference playoffs.

Note: Bolded teams qualified for the playoffs.

Eastern Conference
R		Div	GP	W	L	OTL	ROW	GF	GA	Pts
**1**	**z – Washington Capitals**	**SE**	**82**	**48**	**23**	**11**	**43**	**224**	**197**	107
**2**	**y – Philadelphia Flyers**	**AT**	**82**	**47**	**23**	**12**	**44**	**259**	**223**	106
**3**	**y – Boston Bruins**	**NE**	**82**	**46**	**25**	**11**	**44**	**246**	**195**	103
**4**	**Pittsburgh Penguins**	**AT**	**82**	**49**	**25**	**8**	**39**	**238**	**199**	106
**5**	**Tampa Bay Lightning**	**SE**	**82**	**46**	**25**	**11**	**40**	**247**	**240**	103
**6**	**Montreal Canadiens**	**NE**	**82**	**44**	**30**	**8**	**41**	**216**	**209**	96
**7**	**Buffalo Sabres**	**NE**	**82**	**43**	**29**	**10**	**38**	**245**	**229**	96
**8**	**New York Rangers**	**AT**	**82**	**44**	**33**	**5**	**35**	**233**	**198**	93
8.5
9	Carolina Hurricanes	SE	82	40	31	11	35	236	239	91
10	Toronto Maple Leafs	NE	82	37	34	11	32	218	251	85
11	New Jersey Devils	AT	82	38	39	5	35	174	209	81
12	Atlanta Thrashers	SE	82	34	36	12	29	223	269	80
13	Ottawa Senators	NE	82	32	40	10	30	192	250	74
14	New York Islanders	AT	82	30	39	13	26	229	264	73
15	Florida Panthers	SE	82	30	40	12	26	195	229	72

bold – qualified for playoffs; y – Won division; z – Placed first in conference (and division)
AT – Atlantic Division, NE – Northeast Division, SE – Southeast Division

Western Conference
R		Div	GP	W	L	OTL	ROW	GF	GA	Pts
**1**	**p – Vancouver Canucks**	**NW**	**82**	**54**	**19**	**9**	**50**	**262**	**185**	117
**2**	**y – San Jose Sharks**	**PA**	**82**	**48**	**25**	**9**	**43**	**248**	**213**	105
**3**	**y – Detroit Red Wings**	**CE**	**82**	**47**	**25**	**10**	**43**	**261**	**241**	104
**4**	**Anaheim Ducks**	**PA**	**82**	**47**	**30**	**5**	**43**	**239**	**235**	99
**5**	**Nashville Predators**	**CE**	**82**	**44**	**27**	**11**	**38**	**219**	**194**	99
**6**	**Phoenix Coyotes**	**PA**	**82**	**43**	**26**	**13**	**38**	**231**	**226**	99
**7**	**Los Angeles Kings**	**PA**	**82**	**46**	**30**	**6**	**36**	**219**	**198**	98
**8**	**Chicago Blackhawks**	**CE**	**82**	**44**	**29**	**9**	**38**	**258**	**225**	97
8.5
9	Dallas Stars	PA	82	42	29	11	37	227	233	95
10	Calgary Flames	NW	82	41	29	12	32	250	237	94
11	St. Louis Blues	CE	82	38	33	11	34	240	234	87
12	Minnesota Wild	NW	82	39	35	8	36	206	233	86
13	Columbus Blue Jackets	CE	82	34	35	13	29	215	258	81
14	Colorado Avalanche	NW	82	30	44	8	24	227	288	68
15	Edmonton Oilers	NW	82	25	45	12	23	193	269	62

bold – qualified for playoffs; y – Won division; p – Won President's Trophy (best record in NHL)
CE – Central Division, NW – Northwest Division, PA – Pacific Division

Under NHL rules, first-place teams in each division receive a conference ranking between 1 and 3 regardless of overall points. The Pittsburgh Penguins placed fourth yet had more points than the Boston Bruins, but the Bruins placed first in the Northeast Division to get the third-place ranking.

== Playoffs ==
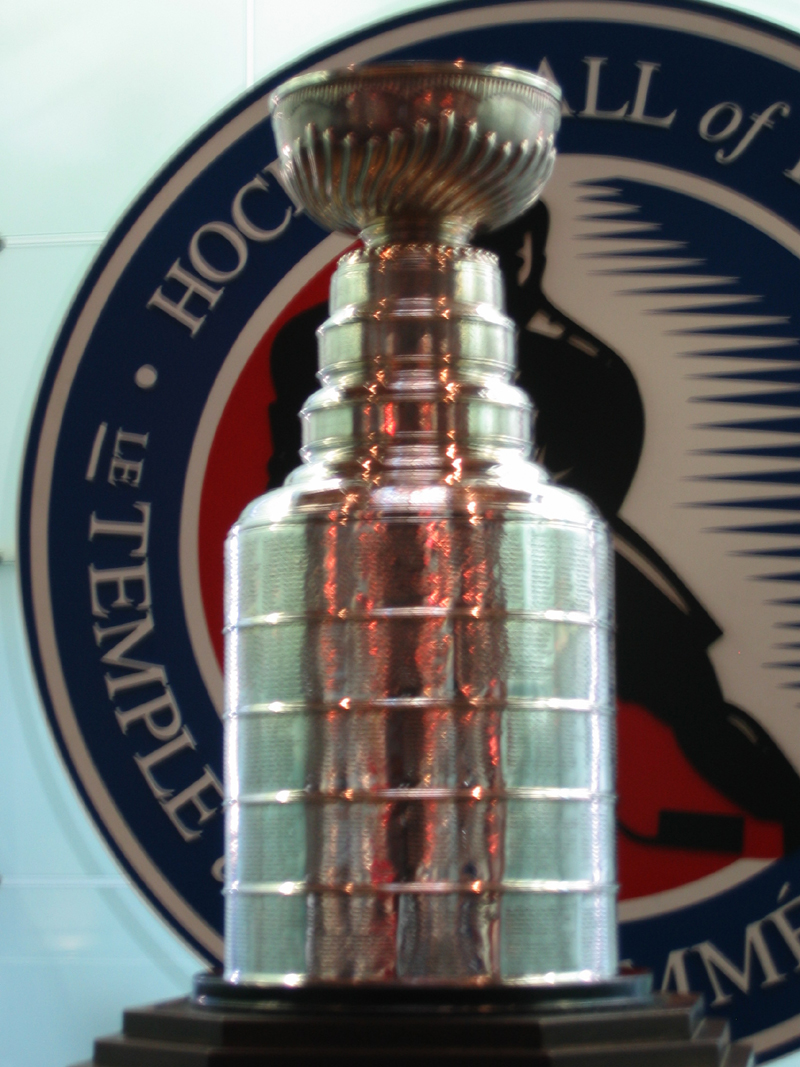
The Stanley Cup

=== Bracket ===
In each round, teams competed in a best-of-seven series following a 2–2–1–1–1 format (scores in the bracket indicate the number of games won in each best-of-seven series). The team with home ice advantage played at home for games one and two (and games five and seven, if necessary), and the other team played at home for games three and four (and game six, if necessary). The top eight teams in each conference made the playoffs, with the three division winners seeded 1–3 based on regular season record, and the five remaining teams seeded 4–8.

The NHL used "re-seeding" instead of a fixed bracket playoff system. During the first three rounds, the highest remaining seed in each conference was matched against the lowest remaining seed, the second-highest remaining seed played the second-lowest remaining seed, and so forth. The higher-seeded team was awarded home ice advantage. The two conference winners then advanced to the Stanley Cup Final, where home ice advantage was awarded to the team that had the better regular season record.

Conference quarterfinals	Conference semifinals
1	Washington	4
8	NY Rangers	1
1	Washington	0
5	Tampa Bay	4
2	Philadelphia	4
7	Buffalo	3
Eastern Conference
3	Boston	4
6	Montreal	3
2	Philadelphia	0
3	Boston	4
4	Pittsburgh	3
5	Tampa Bay	4
1	Vancouver	4
8	Chicago	3
1	Vancouver	4
5	Nashville	2
2	San Jose	4
7	Los Angeles	2
Western Conference
3	Detroit	4
6	Phoenix	0
2	San Jose	4
3	Detroit	3
4	Anaheim	2
5	Nashville	4

Conference finals
5	Tampa Bay	3
3	Boston	4
1	Vancouver	4
2	San Jose	1

Stanley Cup Final
E3	Boston	4
W1	Vancouver	3

== NHL awards ==
Awards were presented at the NHL Awards ceremony, held in Las Vegas, Nevada, on June 22, 2011. Finalists for voted awards are announced during the playoffs and winners are presented at the award ceremony. Voting concluded immediately after the end of the regular season. The Presidents' Trophy, the Prince of Wales Trophy and Clarence S. Campbell Bowl are not presented at the awards ceremony.

2010–11 NHL awards
Award	Recipient(s)	Runner(s)-up/Finalists
Presidents' Trophy	Vancouver Canucks	Washington Capitals
Prince of Wales Trophy (Eastern Conference playoff champion)	Boston Bruins	Tampa Bay Lightning
Clarence S. Campbell Bowl (Western Conference playoff champion)	Vancouver Canucks	San Jose Sharks
Art Ross Trophy	Daniel Sedin (Vancouver Canucks)	Martin St. Louis (Tampa Bay Lightning)
Bill Masterton Memorial Trophy	Ian Laperriere (Philadelphia Flyers)	Ray Emery (Anaheim Ducks); Daymond Langkow (Calgary Flames)
Calder Memorial Trophy	Jeff Skinner (Carolina Hurricanes)	Logan Couture (San Jose Sharks); Michael Grabner (New York Islanders)
Conn Smythe Trophy	Tim Thomas (Boston Bruins)	Brad Marchand (Boston Bruins)
Frank J. Selke Trophy	Ryan Kesler (Vancouver Canucks)	Jonathan Toews (Chicago Blackhawks); Pavel Datsyuk (Detroit Red Wings)
Hart Memorial Trophy	Corey Perry (Anaheim Ducks)	Martin St. Louis (Tampa Bay Lightning); Daniel Sedin (Vancouver Canucks)
Jack Adams Award	Dan Bylsma (Pittsburgh Penguins)	Alain Vigneault (Vancouver Canucks); Barry Trotz (Nashville Predators)
James Norris Memorial Trophy	Nicklas Lidstrom (Detroit Red Wings)	Zdeno Chara (Boston Bruins); Shea Weber (Nashville Predators)
King Clancy Memorial Trophy	Doug Weight (New York Islanders)	Patrice Bergeron (Boston Bruins); Dustin Brown (Los Angeles Kings)
Lady Byng Memorial Trophy	Martin St. Louis (Tampa Bay Lightning)	Nicklas Lidstrom (Detroit Red Wings); Loui Eriksson (Dallas Stars)
Ted Lindsay Award	Daniel Sedin (Vancouver Canucks)	Steven Stamkos (Tampa Bay Lightning); Corey Perry (Anaheim Ducks)
Mark Messier Leadership Award	Zdeno Chara (Boston Bruins)	Nicklas Lidstrom (Detroit Red Wings); Shane Doan (Phoenix Coyotes)
Maurice "Rocket" Richard Trophy	Corey Perry (Anaheim Ducks)	Steven Stamkos (Tampa Bay Lightning)
NHL Foundation Player Award	Dustin Brown (Los Angeles Kings)	Henrik Sedin (Vancouver Canucks); Daniel Sedin (Vancouver Canucks); Mike Green (Washington Capitals)
NHL General Manager of the Year Award	Mike Gillis (Vancouver Canucks)	Steve Yzerman (Tampa Bay Lightning); David Poile (Nashville Predators)
Vezina Trophy	Tim Thomas (Boston Bruins)	Roberto Luongo (Vancouver Canucks); Pekka Rinne (Nashville Predators)
William M. Jennings Trophy	Roberto Luongo and Cory Schneider (Vancouver Canucks)	N/A

=== All-Star teams ===
First Team	Position	Second Team
Tim Thomas, Boston Bruins	G	Pekka Rinne, Nashville Predators
Shea Weber, Nashville Predators	D	Zdeno Chara, Boston Bruins
Nicklas Lidstrom, Detroit Red Wings	D	Lubomir Visnovsky, Anaheim Ducks
Henrik Sedin, Vancouver Canucks	C	Steven Stamkos, Tampa Bay Lightning
Corey Perry, Anaheim Ducks	RW	Martin St. Louis, Tampa Bay Lightning
Daniel Sedin, Vancouver Canucks	LW	Alexander Ovechkin, Washington Capitals

== Player statistics ==
Goals scored versus shots on goal for top 100 goal scorers, 2010–2011 regular season.

=== Scoring leaders ===
The following players led the league in points at the conclusion of the regular season.

GP = Games played; G = Goals; A = Assists; Pts = Points; +/– = P Plus–minus; PIM = Penalty minutes

Player	Team	GP	G	A	Pts	+/–	PIM
Daniel Sedin	Vancouver Canucks	82	41	63	104	+29	32
Martin St. Louis	Tampa Bay Lightning	82	31	68	99	0	12
Corey Perry	Anaheim Ducks	82	50	48	98	+9	104
Henrik Sedin	Vancouver Canucks	82	19	75	94	+26	40
Steven Stamkos	Tampa Bay Lightning	82	45	46	91	+3	74
Jarome Iginla	Calgary Flames	82	43	43	86	0	40
Alexander Ovechkin	Washington Capitals	79	32	53	85	+24	41
Teemu Selanne	Anaheim Ducks	73	31	49	80	+6	49
Henrik Zetterberg	Detroit Red Wings	80	24	56	80	−1	40
Brad Richards	Dallas Stars	72	28	49	77	+1	24

Source: NHL

=== Leading goaltenders ===
The following goaltenders led the league in goals against average at the end of the regular season while playing at least 1800 minutes.

GP = Games played; Min = Minutes played; W = Wins; L = Losses; OT = Overtime/shootout losses; GA = Goals against; SO = Shutouts; SV% = Save percentage; GAA = Goals against average

Player	Team	GP	Min	W	L	OT	GA	SO	SV%	GAA
Tim Thomas	Boston Bruins	57	3,363:58	35	11	9	112	9	.938	2.00
Roberto Luongo	Vancouver Canucks	60	3,589:39	38	15	7	126	4	.928	2.11
Pekka Rinne	Nashville Predators	64	3,789:15	33	22	9	134	6	.930	2.12
Jonathan Quick	Los Angeles Kings	61	3,590:34	35	22	3	134	6	.918	2.24
Henrik Lundqvist	New York Rangers	68	4,006:40	36	27	5	152	11	.923	2.28
Corey Crawford	Chicago Blackhawks	57	3,336:37	33	18	6	128	4	.917	2.30
Marc-Andre Fleury	Pittsburgh Penguins	65	3,695:10	36	20	5	143	3	.918	2.32
Carey Price	Montreal Canadiens	72	4,206:08	38	28	6	165	8	.923	2.35
Antti Niemi	San Jose Sharks	60	3,523:54	35	18	6	140	6	.920	2.38
Brian Boucher	Philadelphia Flyers	34	1,884:34	18	10	4	76	0	.916	2.42

== Coaching changes ==
=== Off-season ===
- Atlanta Thrashers: Craig Ramsay replaced the fired John Anderson.
- Columbus Blue Jackets: Scott Arniel became head coach, replacing interim Claude Noel, who had replaced the fired Ken Hitchcock on February 3, 2010.
- Edmonton Oilers: Tom Renney replaced Pat Quinn, who moved into a role of senior hockey advisor for the team.
- New Jersey Devils: John MacLean replaced Jacques Lemaire, who retired.
- St. Louis Blues: Davis Payne returned for a full season after replacing Andy Murray, who was fired on January 2, 2010.
- Philadelphia Flyers: Peter Laviolette returned for a full season after replacing John Stevens, who was fired on December 4, 2009.
- Tampa Bay Lightning: Guy Boucher replaced the fired Rick Tocchet.

=== In-season ===
- New Jersey Devils: John MacLean was fired as head coach after a 9–22–2 start. Jacques Lemaire, who had retired (per above), then returned to serve as interim head coach.
- New York Islanders: Jack Capuano replaced Scott Gordon after Gordon was fired on November 15, 2010.

== Milestones ==
=== First games ===
The following is a list of notable players who played their first NHL game in 2010–11, listed with their first team:

Player	Team	Notability
Sergei Bobrovsky	Philadelphia Flyers	Two-time NHL All-Star team, two-time Vezina Trophy winner
Taylor Hall	Edmonton Oilers	First overall pick in the 2010 Draft, Hart Memorial Trophy winner, one-time NHL All-Star team
Braden Holtby	Washington Capitals	Two-time NHL All-Star team, Vezina Trophy winner, William M. Jennings Trophy winner
Nick Leddy	Chicago Blackhawks	Over 1,000 games played
Robin Lehner	Ottawa Senators	Two-time William M. Jennings Trophy winner, Bill Masterton Memorial Trophy winner
Jacob Markstrom	Florida Panthers	One-time NHL All-Star team
Ryan McDonagh	New York Rangers	Two-time NHL All-Star
Tyler Seguin	Boston Bruins	Six-time NHL All-Star
Jeff Skinner	Carolina Hurricanes	Calder Trophy winner, youngest All-Star selection ever in the four major North American sports

=== Last games ===
The following is a list of players of note who played their last NHL game in 2010–11, listed with their team:

Player	Team	Notability
Craig Conroy	Calgary Flames	Over 1,000 games played
Kris Draper	Detroit Red Wings	Over 1,100 games played, Selke Trophy winner
Chris Drury	New York Rangers	Calder Trophy winner
Adam Foote	Colorado Avalanche	Over 1,100 games played, the last active player to have been a member of the Quebec Nordiques.
Peter Forsberg	Colorado Avalanche	Hart Trophy winner, member of the Triple Gold Club
Mike Grier	Buffalo Sabres	Over 1,000 games played, first United States-born African American player
Todd Marchant	Anaheim Ducks	Over 1,100 games played
Bryan McCabe	New York Rangers	Over 1,100 games played, one-time NHL All-Star
Mike Modano	Detroit Red Wings	Over 1,400 games played, eight-time NHL All-Star, the last active player to have been a member of the Minnesota North Stars
Fredrik Modin	Calgary Flames	Member of the Triple Gold Club, one-time NHL All-Star
Rob Niedermayer	Buffalo Sabres	Over 1,100 games played
Chris Osgood	Detroit Red Wings	two-time Jennings Trophy winner, two-time NHL All-Star
Brian Rafalski	Detroit Red Wings	Two-time NHL All-Star
Mark Recchi	Boston Bruins	Over 1,600 games played, seven-time NHL All-Star, oldest active player in NHL at time of retirement, last active player to have played in the 1980s
Sergei Samsonov	Florida Panthers	Calder Trophy winner
Marc Savard	Boston Bruins	Two-time NHL All-Star
Cory Stillman	Carolina Hurricanes	Over 1,000 games played
Doug Weight	New York Islanders	Over 1,200 games played, four-time NHL All-Star, King Clancy Memorial Trophy winner

=== Major milestones reached ===
- On October 22, 2010, Ottawa Senators forward Daniel Alfredsson recorded a hat trick, with the third goal being his 1,000th career NHL point. He became the 75th player in league history to record 1,000 points.
- On October 26, Colorado Avalanche defenceman John-Michael Liles recorded an assist in his ninth consecutive game to give him the NHL record for longest assist streak for a defenceman from the start of season.
- On October 26, Ottawa Senators defenceman Sergei Gonchar participated in his 1,000th NHL game.
- On October 28, Calgary Flames forward Craig Conroy participated in his 1,000th NHL game.
- On November 3, Buffalo Sabres forward Mike Grier participated in his 1,000th NHL game.
- On November 6, Los Angeles Kings forward Ryan Smyth participated in his 1,000th NHL game.
- On November 22, Ottawa Senators forward Alexei Kovalev recorded his 1,000th career NHL point with a goal. He became the 76th player in league history to record 1,000 points, and the third Russian born player to do so.
- On November 24, Boston Bruins forward Mark Recchi scored two goals, with the second being his 1,500th career NHL point. He became the 13th player in league history to reach this milestone.
- On December 26, Phoenix Coyotes defenceman Ed Jovanovski participated in his 1,000th NHL game.
- On December 27, Detroit Red Wings goaltender Chris Osgood recorded his 400th NHL win. He became the 10th player in league history to reach this milestone.
- On January 11, 2011, Toronto Maple Leafs coach Ron Wilson won his 600th game as an NHL coach. He became the seventh coach in league history to reach this milestone.
- On January 17, San Jose Sharks forward Patrick Marleau and Dallas Stars forward Jamie Langenbrunner both participated in their 1,000th NHL game in separate contests. Marleau was the third youngest player in NHL history to reach 1,000 games played.
- On February 1, Minnesota Wild forward Andrew Brunette participated in his 1,000th NHL game.
- On February 10, New Jersey Devils coach Jacques Lemaire won his 600th game as an NHL coach. He became the eighth coach in league history to reach this milestone.
- On February 16, Florida Panthers forward Cory Stillman participated in his 1,000th NHL game.
- On February 20, Detroit Red Wings forward Todd Bertuzzi participated in his 1,000th NHL game.
- On March 20, Phoenix Coyotes defenceman Adrian Aucoin participated in his 1,000th NHL game.
- On April 1, Calgary Flames forward Jarome Iginla scored two goals and added an assist to reach 1,000 career points. He became the 77th player in league history to do so.
- On April 8, San Jose Sharks forward Joe Thornton recorded his 1,000th career NHL point with a goal. He became the 78th player to reach the milestone and the fourth this season.
- On April 9, Montreal Canadiens coach Jacques Martin won his 600th game as an NHL coach. He became the ninth coach in league history to reach this milestone.
- On April 9, Boston Bruins forward Mark Recchi played in his 1,652nd NHL game, surpassing Chris Chelios for sole possession of the fourth spot on the NHL's all-time games played list.

== Broadcasting rights ==
=== Canada ===
This was the third season of the league's Canadian national broadcast rights deals with CBC and TSN. During the regular season, CBC continued to air Saturday night Hockey Night in Canada games while TSN aired games on Wednesdays and other selected weeknights. CBC and TSN then split the first three rounds of the playoffs, selecting the rights to individual series using a draft-like setup. The Stanley Cup Final aired exclusively on CBC.

=== United States ===
This was the sixth and final season of the league's U.S. national broadcast rights deals with NBC and Versus before the two networks reached a new deal in April 2011. Under the previous deal expiring at the end of the 2010–11 season, Versus aired games generally on Monday and Tuesday nights, while NBC had games on selected weekends. During the playoffs, NBC had the rights to air selected weekend games during the first three postseason rounds of the Stanley Cup playoffs, while Versus televised selected first and second round playoff games and all conference finals games not aired on NBC. Due to NBC's scheduling, the network broadcast the first two and final three games of the Stanley Cup Final, while Versus broadcast games 3 and 4.

In January 2011, Comcast, owner of Versus, acquired NBCUniversal, resulting in the merging of all its sports properties with the NBC Sports division. The merged company then signed a new 10-year, US$2 billion deal with the NHL in April 2011, extending and unifying the broadcast and cable television rights held by NBC and Versus. Notable changes under the new deal included an increase in nationally televised games on Versus (which was to be renamed under the NBC name), a new Thanksgiving Friday game on NBC, holding exclusive rights to all playoff games beginning with the second round (as opposed to the conference Final), and plans to broadcast all playoff games (subject to blackouts during the first round) nationally on NBCUniversal channels.

== See also ==
- 2010–11 NHL transactions
- 2010–11 NHL suspensions and fines
- 2010 NHL entry draft
- 2010 in sports
- 2011 in sports
- List of 2010–11 NHL Three Star Awards
