= Curt Fraser =

American ice hockey player and coach

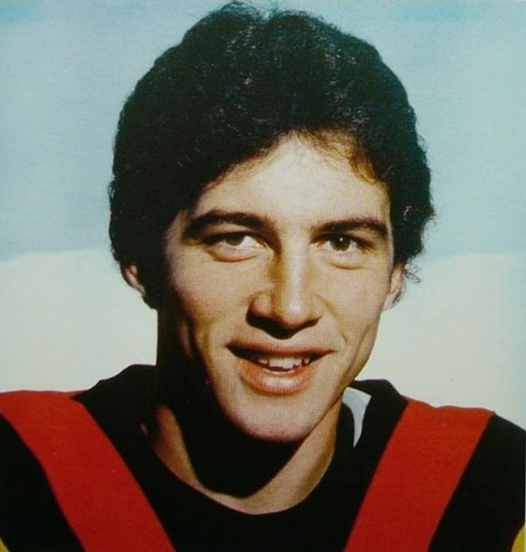
- Fraser in 1978 card
- Born: January 12, 1958 (age 68) Cincinnati, Ohio, U.S.
- Height: 6 ft 0 in (183 cm)
- Weight: 200 lb (91 kg; 14 st 4 lb)
- Position: Left wing
- Shot: Left
- Played for: Vancouver Canucks; Chicago Black Hawks; Minnesota North Stars
- National team: United States
- NHL draft: 22nd overall, 1978; Vancouver Canucks
- Playing career: 1978–1990

Curtis Martin Fraser (born January 12, 1958) is an American former professional ice hockey player who played for the Vancouver Canucks, Chicago Blackhawks and the Minnesota North Stars of the National Hockey League (NHL) between 1978-79 and 1989-90. He featured in the 1982 Stanley Cup Finals with the Canucks.

Fraser was born in Cincinnati while his father, Barry Beatty played for the International Hockey League (IHL)'s Cincinnati Mohawks, and was raised in Winnipeg and Vancouver. He holds dual Canadian and American citizenship. Fraser was diagnosed with diabetes in 1983 and is active in fundraising and awareness efforts for the disease.

== Playing career ==
As a youth, he played in the 1971 Quebec International Pee-Wee Hockey Tournament with a minor ice hockey team from North Vancouver.

Fraser played junior hockey with the Victoria Cougars of the Western Hockey League, where he set franchise records for goals, assists, points, and penalty minutes. He was then drafted 22nd overall by the Vancouver Canucks in the 1978 NHL Amateur Draft. He made the team right away and was placed on a line with fellow rookies Thomas Gradin and Stan Smyl. The trio would be the Canucks' top offensive line for the next four years and play a large role in the club's trip to the 1982 Stanley Cup Finals.

On December 20, 1982, Fraser was traded to the Chicago Black Hawks for Tony Tanti. He had his best season in Chicago, registering 68 points (29 goals and 39 assists) in only 61 games in 1985–86. After five years with the Hawks, he was dealt to the Minnesota North Stars on January 2, 1988, for Dirk Graham. After playing in only 53 games over the next two and a half years with the Stars, his back problems forced him to retire in 1990.

Owing to his dual U.S./Canadian citizenship, Fraser has represented both countries in international tournaments. He played for Canada at the 1978 World Junior Championship and for the USA at the 1987 Canada Cup.

== Coaching career ==
After his playing career ended, Fraser embarked upon a coaching career. After minor league stops in Milwaukee, Syracuse, and Orlando, Fraser became the first head coach of the Atlanta Thrashers in 1999. His record was 64–169–46 over three and a half seasons with Atlanta before being fired in 2003. Since then he has served as an assistant coach with the New York Islanders and St. Louis Blues.

Recently, he has coached the Belarusian national men's ice hockey team at the 2007 and 2008 IIHF World Championships.

On July 23, 2008, the American Hockey League's Grand Rapids Griffins hired Fraser as their head coach, where he served until June 18, 2012, when he was hired by the Dallas Stars as assistant coach. He remained in that position for five seasons.

Fraser was named head coach of Kunlun Red Star of the Kontinental Hockey League (KHL) in the second half of the 2018–19 season. He remained with Kunlun through to the 2019–20 season, unable to guide the Chinese club to the post-season.

== Career statistics ==
=== Regular season and playoffs ===
			Regular season					Playoffs
Season	Team	League	GP	G	A	Pts	PIM	GP	G	A	Pts	PIM
1973–74	Kelowna Buckaroos	BCHL	52	32	32	64	85	—	—	—	—	—
1974–75	Victoria Cougars	WCHL	68	17	32	49	105	12	2	3	5	22
1975–76	Victoria Cougars	WCHL	71	43	64	107	167	18	3	8	11	38
1976–77	Victoria Cougars	WCHL	60	34	41	75	82	4	4	2	6	4
1977–78	Victoria Cougars	WCHL	66	48	44	92	256	13	10	7	17	28
1978–79	Vancouver Canucks	NHL	78	16	19	35	116	3	0	2	2	6
1979–80	Vancouver Canucks	NHL	78	17	25	42	143	4	0	0	0	2
1980–81	Vancouver Canucks	NHL	77	25	24	49	118	3	1	0	1	2
1981–82	Vancouver Canucks	NHL	79	28	39	67	175	17	3	7	10	98
1982–83	Vancouver Canucks	NHL	36	6	7	13	99	—	—	—	—	—
1982–83	Chicago Black Hawks	NHL	38	6	13	19	77	13	4	4	8	18
1983–84	Chicago Black Hawks	NHL	29	5	12	17	28	5	0	0	0	14
1984–85	Chicago Black Hawks	NHL	73	25	25	50	109	15	6	3	9	36
1985–86	Chicago Black Hawks	NHL	61	29	39	68	84	3	0	1	1	12
1986–87	Chicago Blackhawks	NHL	75	25	25	50	182	2	1	1	2	10
1987–88	Chicago Blackhawks	NHL	27	4	6	10	57	—	—	—	—	—
1987–88	Minnesota North Stars	NHL	10	1	1	2	20	—	—	—	—	—
1988–89	Minnesota North Stars	NHL	35	5	5	10	76	—	—	—	—	—
1989–90	Minnesota North Stars	NHL	8	1	0	1	22	—	—	—	—	—
NHL totals			704	193	240	433	1,306	65	15	18	33	198

=== International ===
Year	Team	Event	GP	G	A	Pts	PIM
1978	Canada	WJC	5	0	2	2	0
1987	United States	CC	5	0	1	1	4

=== Coaching ===
Team	Year	Regular season							Postseason
Team	Year	G	W	L	T	OTL	Pts	Division rank	Result
Atlanta Thrashers	1999–2000	82	14	57	7	4	39	5th in Southeast	Missed Playoffs
Atlanta Thrashers	2000–01	82	23	45	12	2	60	4th in Southeast	Missed Playoffs
Atlanta Thrashers	2001–02	82	19	47	11	5	54	5th in Southeast	Missed Playoffs
Atlanta Thrashers	2002–03	33	8	20	1	4	(74)	3rd in Southeast	Missed Playoffs
Total		279	64	169	31	15			

Sporting positions
Preceded by Winnipeg Jets coaches Terry Simpson	Head coach of the Atlanta Thrashers; 1999–2002	Succeeded by Don Waddell
