= Craig Ramsay =

Canadian ice hockey player and coach

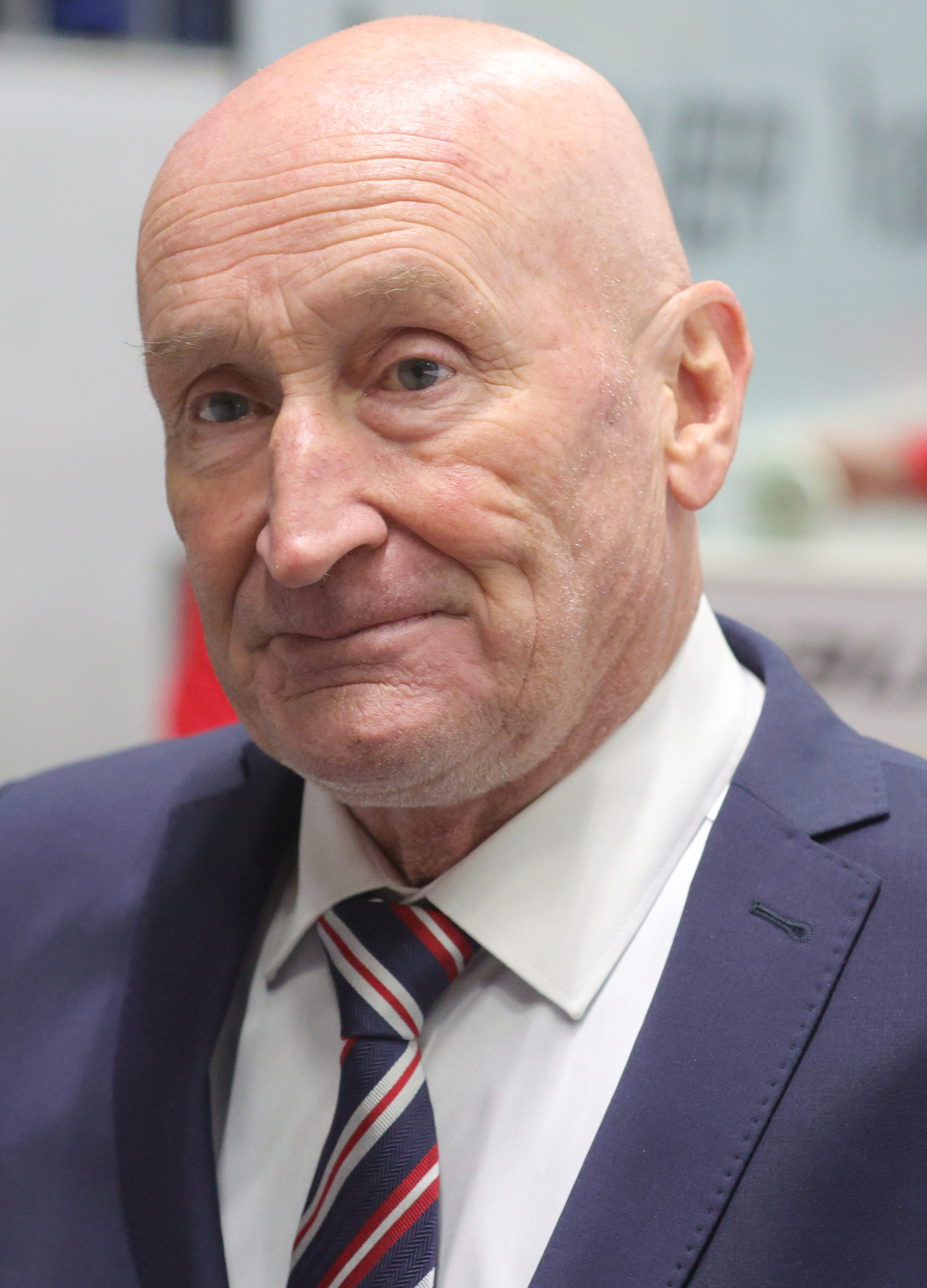
- Ramsay in 2024
- Born: March 17, 1951 (age 75) Weston, Ontario, Canada
- Height: 5 ft 10 in (178 cm)
- Weight: 175 lb (79 kg; 12 st 7 lb)
- Position: Left wing
- Shot: Left
- Played for: Buffalo Sabres
- Coached for: Buffalo Sabres; Philadelphia Flyers; Atlanta Thrashers
- NHL draft: 19th overall, 1971; Buffalo Sabres
- Playing career: 1971–1985
- Coaching career: 1985–2025

Craig Edward Ramsay (born March 17, 1951) is a Canadian professional ice hockey coach and former player. He played in the National Hockey League (NHL) from 1971 to 1985 for the Buffalo Sabres, notably featuring in the 1975 Stanley Cup Final with the Sabres. After his playing career, he became a coach with the Sabres and later served as the final head coach of the Atlanta Thrashers. From 2017 to 2025, he was the head coach of the Slovakia men's national ice hockey team.

== Playing career ==
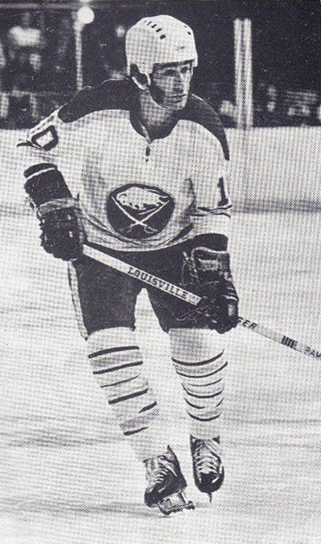
Ramsey in 1974 photo for Buffalo Sabres

Ramsay began his hockey career with the Peterborough Petes in 1968. Ramsay spent four seasons in Peterborough where he excelled at the game. He caught the attention of many scouts and in 1971 he was drafted 19th overall by the Buffalo Sabres in the 1971 NHL Amateur Draft.

In 1971–72, Ramsay played a couple of games in the American Hockey League (AHL) before being called up by the Sabres. He was paired up with his close friend Don Luce and together, the two formed a formidable offensive-defensive line that shut out many of the NHL's top lines.

In 1974–75, the Sabres drafted young prospect Danny Gare and he was paired up with Ramsay and Luce. The Sabres that year made it all the way to the Stanley Cup Final before being defeated by the Philadelphia Flyers. Ramsay had a total tally of 12 points during that run. With the addition of Danny Gare, Ramsay's line became not only a threat defensively but also offensively.

Ramsay had eight consecutive 20 goal seasons and was selected to play in the 1976 NHL All-Star Game. His linemate, Gare scored a total of 56 goals in 1979–80. Ramsay played for ten seasons for the Sabres which included playing 776 games consecutively.

In 1984–85, Ramsay was awarded the Frank J. Selke Trophy for his defensive capabilities as a forward. Ramsay retired shortly afterwards ending a 14-year career with the Sabres which included 1,070 career NHL games, 252 goals and 420 assists for 672 points. He was inducted into the Buffalo Sabres Hall of Fame in 1986 to honour his playing career with the club.

Ramsay was the last player to play a full season without incurring any penalties. He did this in 1973–74, playing 78 games and recording 46 points.

== Coaching career ==
Following Ramsay's retirement, he was named the assistant coach for the Buffalo Sabres in 1986–87 and served as interim head coach late in the year posting a 4–15–2 record. He also served as the team director of player personnel and assistant general manager with the Sabres. In 1992–93, Ramsay left the Sabres organization and joined the Florida Panthers as assistant coach. He stayed there until 1995 before joining the Ottawa Senators also as an assistant coach.

In 1997–98, Ramsay joined the Philadelphia Flyers. He was named interim head coach in February 2000 for Roger Neilson who was being treated for cancer. Ramsay guided the team with a 16–8–1–0 record while claiming the Atlantic Division with 105 points. He led the team all the way to the Eastern Conference Final before being eliminated by the eventual Stanley Cup champions, New Jersey Devils. He was hired permanently by the Flyers after Neilson was dismissed for health reasons at the end of the 1999–2000 NHL season and before the 2000–01 season before being fired after 28 games as the Flyers went 12–12–4–0 to start the season.

He joined the Tampa Bay Lightning in 2001 as an assistant coach. There, Ramsay won his first Stanley Cup in 2004 as the Lightning beat the Calgary Flames in seven games. In 2006–07, he joined the Boston Bruins as assistant coach. The Bruins made the playoffs every year and finished first in the Eastern Conference in 2008–09. On June 24, 2010, he was named the head coach for the Atlanta Thrashers. He was dismissed by the team's new ownership group, True North Sports and Entertainment following the Thrasher's relocation to Winnipeg, Manitoba. Ramsay was appointed an assistant coach with the Florida Panthers under head coach Kevin Dineen following his dismissal from Atlanta. He was fired by the Panthers along with Dineen and assistant coach Gord Murphy on November 8, 2013. Ramsay was hired by the Edmonton Oilers as assistant coach on June 10, 2014, to replace Kelly Buchberger. He was let go by the Oilers on June 4, 2015, along with fellow assistant Keith Acton.

Ramsay joined the Slovakia men's national ice hockey team as head coach on a two-year deal in 2017. He failed to lead Slovakia to the knockout stage of the 2019 IIHF World Championship held in their own country, but signed a one-year extension later that year. After guiding Slovakia to a second 9th-place finish in as many years at the 2020 World Championship, he extended his tenure to the end of the 2021/22 season. His emphasis on offensive play bore fruit when the team won the bronze medal at the 2022 Winter Olympics in Beijing, defeating Sweden 4–0. Ramseys contract was extended several times. However, he was unable to coach the team at the 2025 IIHF World Championship due to pneumonia. In July 2025, it was announced Ramsey will not continue as the head coach of Team Slovakia.

A biography of Ramsay was published in Slovakia in November 2022. Titled Šťastný chlapec (Happy Boy), it was written by Peter Jánošík and Tomáš Kyselica, two members of the Slovak Ice Hockey Federation's public relations team.

== Awards and achievements ==
- Played in 1976 NHL All-Star Game
- Frank J. Selke Trophy winner in 1985
- Stanley Cup champion in 2004 (as assistant coach)
- Bronze medal at the 2022 Winter Olympics as head coach of the Slovak national team

== Career statistics ==
			Regular season					Playoffs
Season	Team	League	GP	G	A	Pts	PIM	GP	G	A	Pts	PIM
1967–68	Peterborough Petes	OHA-Jr.	40	6	13	19	21	5	0	0	0	4
1968–69	Peterborough Petes	OHA-Jr.	54	11	28	39	20	10	1	2	3	9
1969–70	Peterborough Petes	OHA-Jr.	54	27	41	68	18	6	1	3	4	7
1970–71	Peterborough Petes	OHA-Jr.	58	30	76	106	25	5	2	2	4	2
1971–72	Cincinnati Swords	AHL	19	5	7	12	4	—	—	—	—	—
1971–72	Buffalo Sabres	NHL	57	6	10	16	0	—	—	—	—	—
1972–73	Buffalo Sabres	NHL	76	11	17	28	15	6	1	1	2	0
1973–74	Buffalo Sabres	NHL	78	20	26	46	0	—	—	—	—	—
1974–75	Buffalo Sabres	NHL	80	26	38	64	26	17	5	7	12	2
1975–76	Buffalo Sabres	NHL	80	22	49	71	34	9	1	2	3	2
1976–77	Buffalo Sabres	NHL	80	20	41	61	20	6	0	4	4	0
1977–78	Buffalo Sabres	NHL	80	28	43	71	18	8	3	1	4	9
1978–79	Buffalo Sabres	NHL	80	26	31	57	10	3	1	0	1	2
1979–80	Buffalo Sabres	NHL	80	21	39	60	18	10	0	6	6	4
1980–81	Buffalo Sabres	NHL	80	24	35	59	12	8	2	4	6	4
1981–82	Buffalo Sabres	NHL	80	16	35	51	8	4	1	1	2	0
1982–83	Buffalo Sabres	NHL	64	11	18	29	7	10	2	3	5	4
1983–84	Buffalo Sabres	NHL	76	9	17	26	17	3	0	1	1	0
1984–85	Buffalo Sabres	NHL	79	12	21	33	16	5	1	1	2	0
NHL totals			1,070	252	420	672	201	89	17	31	48	27

== NHL coaching record ==
Team	Year	Regular season							Playoffs		
Team	Year	G	W	L	T	OTL	Pts	Finish	W	L	Result
Buffalo Sabres	1986–87	21	4	15	2	—	10	5th in Adams	—	—	Missed playoffs
Philadelphia Flyers	1999–00	25	16	8	1	0	33	1st in Atlantic	11	7	Lost in Conference Final
Philadelphia Flyers	2000–01	28	12	12	4	0	28	Fired	—	—	—
Atlanta Thrashers	2010–11	82	34	36	—	12	80	4th in Southeast	—	—	Missed playoffs
Total		156	66	71	7	12			11	7	

== See also ==
- List of NHL players with 1,000 games played
- List of NHL players who spent their entire career with one franchise

Preceded by Doug Jarvis	Winner of the Frank J. Selke Trophy; 1985	Succeeded by Troy Murray
Preceded by Scotty Bowman	Head coach of the Buffalo Sabres; 1986–87	Succeeded by Ted Sator
Preceded by Roger Neilson	Head coach of the Philadelphia Flyers; 2000–01	Succeeded by Bill Barber
Preceded by John Anderson	Head coach of the Atlanta Thrashers; 2010–11	Succeeded by Claude Noel (Winnipeg Jets)
