= John Anderson (ice hockey, born 1957) =

Canadian ice hockey coach (born 1957)

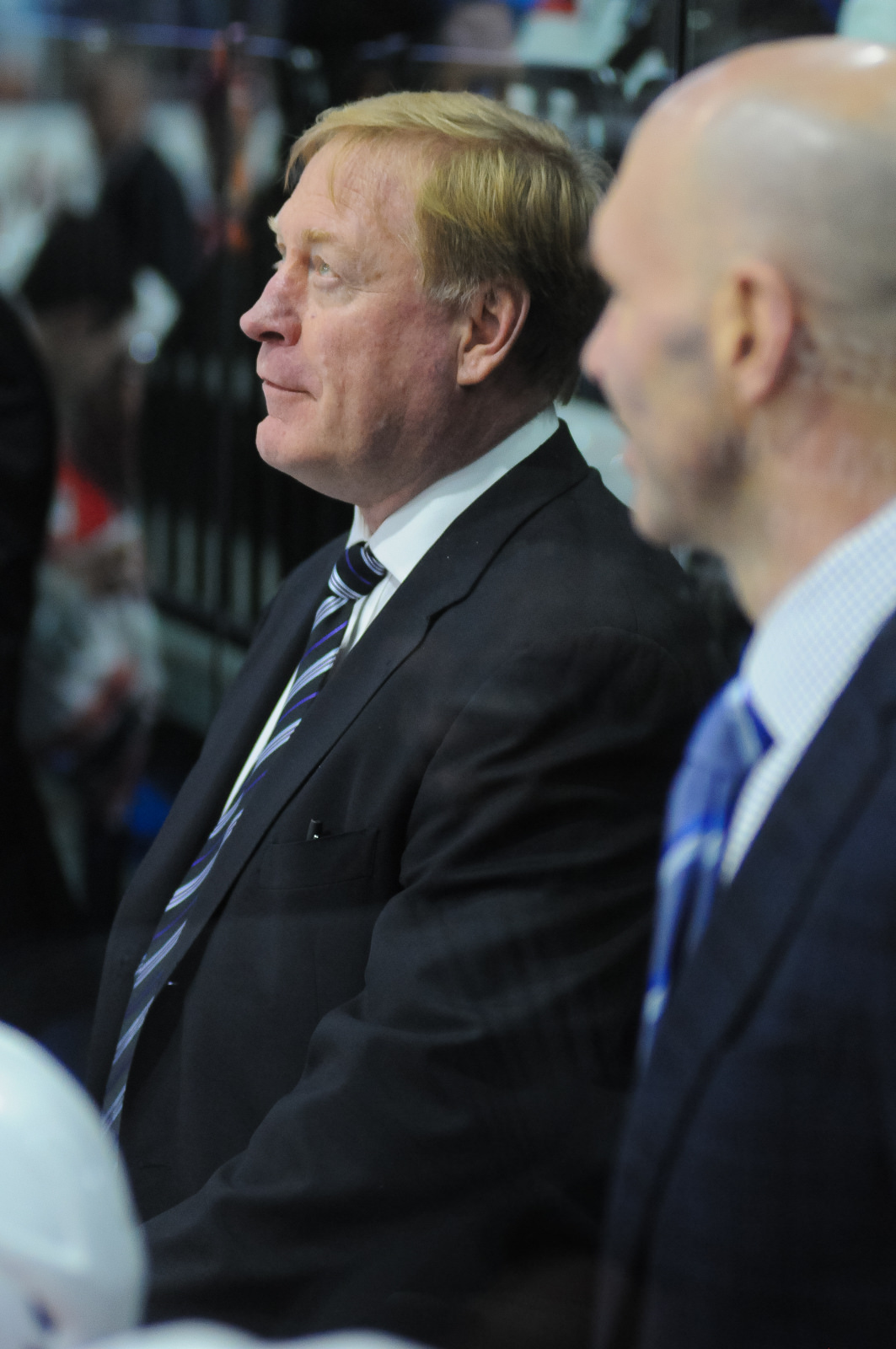
- Born: March 28, 1957 (age 69) Toronto, Ontario, Canada
- Height: 5 ft 11 in (180 cm)
- Weight: 200 lb (91 kg; 14 st 4 lb)
- Position: Right wing
- Shot: Left
- Played for: Toronto Maple Leafs; Quebec Nordiques; Hartford Whalers
- National team: Canada
- NHL draft: 11th overall, 1977; Toronto Maple Leafs
- WHA draft: 14th overall, 1977; Quebec Nordiques
- Playing career: 1977–1994
Medal record
Representing Canada
Ice hockey
World Championships
Bronze medal – third place	1983 West Germany
Silver medal – second place	1985 Prague

John Murray Anderson (born March 28, 1957) is a Canadian former ice hockey right winger. He was the head coach of the Chicago Wolves of the International Hockey League (IHL) and American Hockey League (AHL) from 1997 to 2008, again from 2013 to 2016. Anderson also served as interim head coach for the Wolves in 2023. In the National Hockey League (NHL), he is a former head coach of the Atlanta Thrashers and assistant coach of the Phoenix Coyotes and Minnesota Wild. He played 12 seasons in the NHL for the Toronto Maple Leafs, Quebec Nordiques, and Hartford Whalers.

== Playing career ==
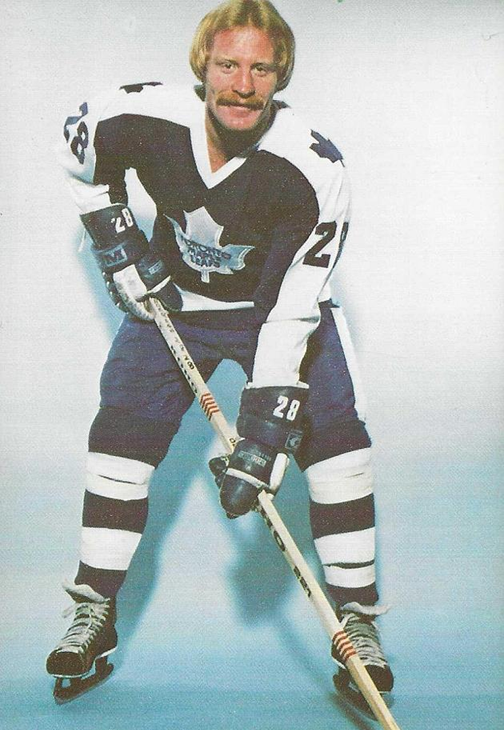
1978 postcard of Anderson for Toronto Maple Leafs

As a youth, Anderson played in the 1969 Quebec International Pee-Wee Hockey Tournament with a minor ice hockey team from Wexford, Toronto. Anderson was the captain of his junior team, the Toronto Marlboros. He attended Sir John A. Macdonald and L'Amoreaux Collegiate Institutes in Scarborough while playing Junior Hockey.

Anderson was drafted in the first round, 11th overall by the Toronto Maple Leafs in the 1977 NHL entry draft. He played 814 career NHL games, scoring 282 goals and 349 assists for 631 points from 1977–78 until 1988–89. Anderson was beginning to establish himself during his third season in Toronto when the club made a four-player trade with the Vancouver Canucks that brought winger Rick Vaive and centre Bill Derlago to Toronto. Anderson was paired with the two new acquisitions to form a high scoring line for the Maple Leafs. His best statistical season was the 1982–83 season, when he set career highs with 49 assists and 80 points. Following the 1984–85 season, the fourth year in a row that Anderson had scored 30-or-more goals for the Maple Leafs, he was traded to the Quebec Nordiques for defensemen Brad Maxwell.

Anderson continued to be a valued goal scorer with Quebec and had scored 21 goals when he was traded to the Hartford Whalers. Anderson then ended the 1985–86 season in Hartford with 25 points in 14 games following the trade, finishing the season with 29 goals and 74 points before scoring another 13 points in ten playoff games. The following year, his first full year with Hartford, Whalers sniper Sylvain Turgeon battled injuries and Anderson filled in as the top left wing on the team. He hit the 30-goal plateau for the fifth and final time of his career finishing with 31 goals and 75 points, good for the third highest point total on the team. Anderson scored the winning goal against the New York Rangers on April 4, 1987, to give the Hartford Whalers their only division championship. He played two more years in Hartford before playing the last five seasons of his career in the minor leagues, primarily the International Hockey League, where he was a solid goal scorer.

As a player/assistant coach with the AHL’s New Haven Nighthawks in 1991-92, Anderson was voted a First Team AHL All-Star at left wing, the winner of the Les Cunningham Award as the league’s most valuable player, and the recipient of the Fred T. Hunt Memorial Award for sportsmanship, determination and dedication to hockey.

== Post-playing career ==
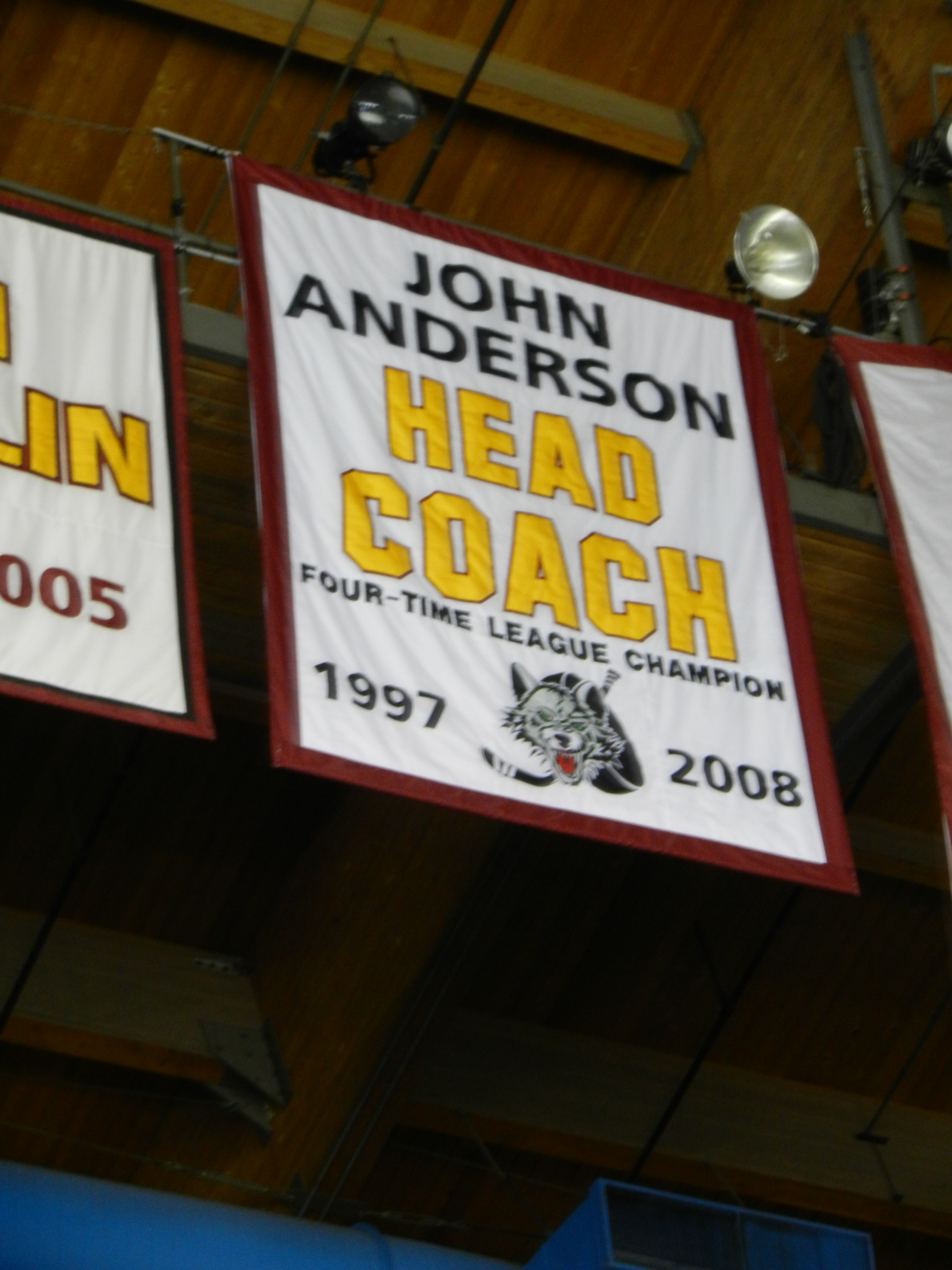
Chicago Wolves banner honoring Anderson's coaching history with the franchise

Anderson coached the 1995–96 Winston-Salem Mammoths to the Southern Hockey League finals during the league's only season where they lost to the Huntsville Channel Cats. In 1996–97, Anderson coached the Quad City Mallards to their first Colonial Hockey League championship in the franchise's second season.

In 1997, Anderson was hired as the head coach of the Chicago Wolves in the International Hockey League (IHL) and later in the American Hockey League (AHL). He became the Wolves' all-time coaching leader in wins with 371 and for postseason victories with 80. Anderson led the Wolves in winning the Turner Cup and Calder Cup four times in his initial eleven seasons at the team's helm. His team was crowned league champions in 1998, 2000 in the IHL and 2002 and 2008 in the AHL. Anderson coached the American gold medal-winning team in the 2007 Jewish World Cup hockey tournament in Israel.

On June 20, 2008, Anderson was named as the fourth head coach of the Atlanta Thrashers. On October 10, 2008, Anderson won his first game as an NHL coach 7–4 against Bruce Boudreau's Washington Capitals. On April 14, 2010, Anderson was released as head coach of the Thrashers after two seasons.

On July 12, 2011, Anderson became an assistant coach for the Phoenix Coyotes. On July 10, 2013, Anderson was rehired as the head coach of the Chicago Wolves. After leaving the Wolves in 2016, he joined the Minnesota Wild as an assistant head coach until 2018. In February 2022, he agreed to join the Bakersfield Condors of the AHL as an assistant coach for the remainder of the 2021–22 season.

For his achievements with coaching the Wolves, he was named to the AHL Hall of Fame in 2019.

Anderson also helped establish John Anderson's, a diner best known for its "Banquet Burger", as well as its $4 breakfast special. The original restaurant is located at Victoria Park Ave. and Van Horne Ave. in Toronto, Ontario.

== Career statistics ==
=== Regular season and playoffs ===
			Regular season					Playoffs
Season	Team	League	GP	G	A	Pts	PIM	GP	G	A	Pts	PIM
1972–73	Markham Waxers	MetJHL	—	—	—	—	—	—	—	—	—	—
1973–74	Markham Waxers	OPJHL	—	—	—	—	—	—	—	—	—	—
1973–74	Toronto Marlboros	OHA	38	22	22	44	6	—	—	—	—	—
1974–75	Toronto Marlboros	OMJHL	70	49	64	113	31	22	16	14	30	14
1974–75	Toronto Marlboros	M-Cup	—	—	—	—	—	4	4	6	10	2
1975–76	Toronto Marlboros	OMJHL	39	26	25	51	19	10	7	4	11	7
1976–77	Toronto Marlboros	OMJHL	64	57	62	119	42	6	3	5	8	0
1977–78	Dallas Black Hawks	CHL	52	22	23	45	6	13	11	8	19	2
1977–78	Toronto Maple Leafs	NHL	17	1	2	3	2	2	0	0	0	0
1978–79	Toronto Maple Leafs	NHL	71	15	11	26	10	6	0	2	2	0
1979–80	Toronto Maple Leafs	NHL	74	25	28	53	22	3	1	1	2	0
1980–81	Toronto Maple Leafs	NHL	75	17	26	43	31	2	0	0	0	0
1981–82	Toronto Maple Leafs	NHL	69	31	26	57	30	—	—	—	—	—
1982–83	Toronto Maple Leafs	NHL	80	31	49	80	24	4	2	4	6	0
1983–84	Toronto Maple Leafs	NHL	73	37	31	68	22	—	—	—	—	—
1984–85	Toronto Maple Leafs	NHL	75	32	31	63	27	—	—	—	—	—
1985–86	Quebec Nordiques	NHL	65	21	28	49	26	—	—	—	—	—
1985–86	Hartford Whalers	NHL	14	8	17	25	2	10	5	8	13	0
1986–87	Hartford Whalers	NHL	76	31	44	75	19	6	1	2	3	0
1987–88	Hartford Whalers	NHL	63	17	32	49	20	—	—	—	—	—
1988–89	Hartford Whalers	NHL	62	16	24	40	28	4	0	1	1	2
1989–90	Binghamton Whalers	AHL	3	1	1	2	0	—	—	—	—	—
1989–90	HC Milano Saima	ITA	9	7	9	16	18	—	—	—	—	—
1989–90	EHC Chur	CHE-2	3	2	0	2	0	—	—	—	—	—
1990–91	Fort Wayne Komets	IHL	63	40	43	83	24	1	3	0	3	0
1991–92	New Haven Nighthawks	AHL	68	41	54	95	24	4	0	4	4	0
1992–93	San Diego Gulls	IHL	65	34	46	80	18	11	5	6	11	4
1993–94	San Diego Gulls	IHL	72	24	24	48	32	4	1	1	2	8
NHL totals			814	282	349	631	263	37	9	18	27	2

=== International ===
Year	Team	Event	GP	G	A	Pts	PIM
1977	Canada	WJC	7	10	5	15	6
1983	Canada	WC	6	2	2	4	6
1985	Canada	WC	9	5	2	7	18
Senior totals			15	7	4	11	24

== NHL coaching statistics ==
Team	Year	Regular season						Postseason
Team	Year	G	W	L	OTL	Pts	Division rank	Result
ATL	2008–09	82	35	41	6	76	4th in Southeast	Missed playoffs
ATL	2009–10	82	35	34	13	83	2nd in Southeast	Missed playoffs
Total		164	70	75	19			

Preceded by Don Waddell	Head coaches of the Atlanta Thrashers; 2008–10	Succeeded by Craig Ramsay
Preceded by Alpo Suhonen	Head coaches of the Chicago Wolves; 1997–2008	Succeeded by Don Granato
Preceded by Don Ashby	Toronto Maple Leafs first-round draft pick 1977	Succeeded by Trevor Johansen
