= John Thrasher =

John Thrasher may refer to:

- John Thrasher (pioneer) (1818–1899), pioneer of Atlanta, Georgia, U.S.
- John Thrasher (Florida politician) (1943–2025), American politician in Florida
