= Atlanta Thrashers =

Former National Hockey League team (1999–2011)

- Conference: Eastern
- Division: Southeast
- Founded: 1999
- History: Winnipeg Jets; 1972–1979 (WHA); 1979–1996 (NHL); Atlanta Thrashers; 1999–2011; Winnipeg Jets; 2011–present
- Home arena: Philips Arena
- City: Atlanta, Georgia
- Team colors: Atlanta midnight blue, Thrasher ice blue, Georgia bronze, Capitol copper, Peachtree gold, white
- Stanley Cups: 0
- Conference championships: 0
- Presidents' Trophies: 0
- Division championships: 1 (2006–07)
- Official website: www.nhl.com/thrashers (2010 archive)

The Atlanta Thrashers were a professional ice hockey team based in Atlanta. The city was granted a franchise in the National Hockey League (NHL) on June 25, 1997, and became the league's 28th franchise when it began play in the 1999–2000 season. They were members of the Southeast Division of the NHL's Eastern Conference, and played their home games at Philips Arena in downtown Atlanta.

Despite several high-level draft picks and some high-profile player acquisitions, including two first-overall selections, the Thrashers only qualified for the Stanley Cup playoffs once, after winning the Southeast Division in the 2006–07 season.

In May 2011, the Thrashers were sold to Canadian-based ownership group True North Sports & Entertainment. The group moved the franchise to Winnipeg, where it became the second incarnation of the Winnipeg Jets (the first one moved to Phoenix in 1996 to become the Coyotes). The move, approved by the NHL on June 21, 2011, made Atlanta the first city in the NHL's modern era to lose two ice hockey teams. In both cases, the team moved from Atlanta to a Western Canadian city; the city's previous NHL team, the Atlanta Flames, moved to Calgary in 1980 to become the Calgary Flames.

== History ==
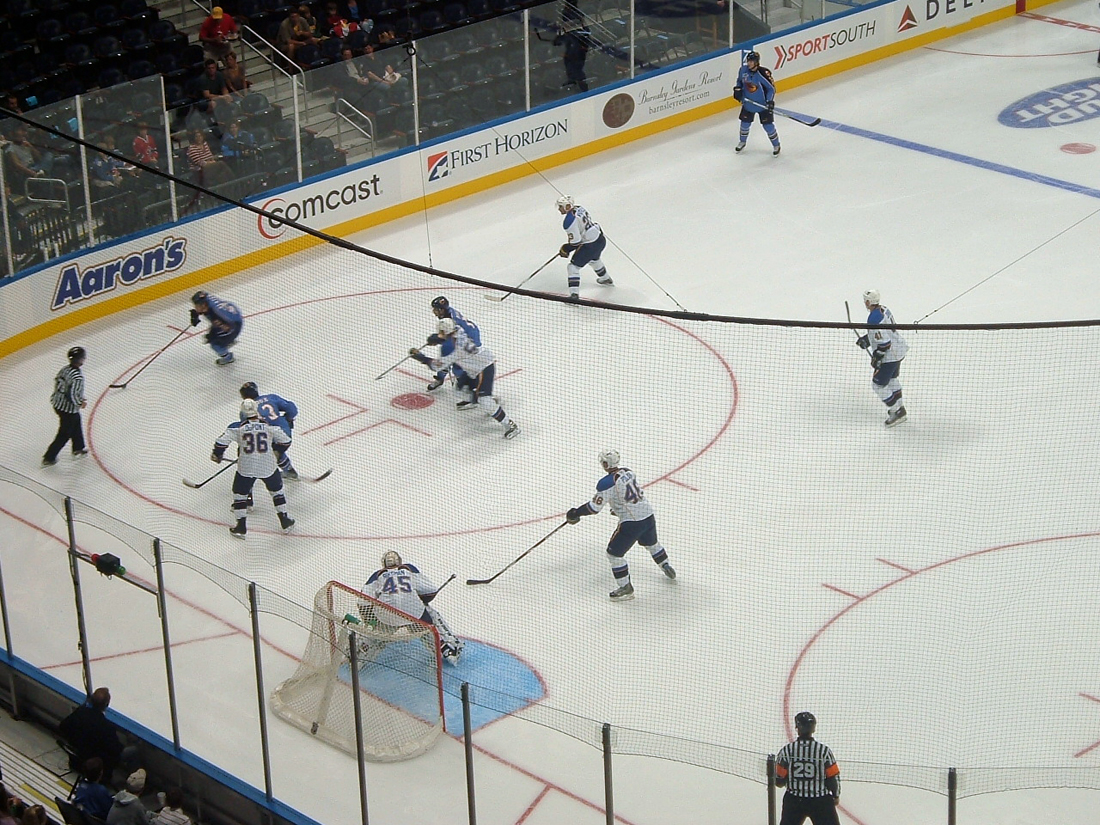
The Thrashers take the puck into the offensive zone against the St. Louis Blues at Philips Arena on September 22, 2007.

After the departure of the International Hockey League (IHL)'s Atlanta Knights (1992–1996) to become the Quebec Rafales, the city of Atlanta was awarded an NHL franchise on June 25, 1997, as part of a four-team tiered expansion. This also included teams in Nashville, Columbus, and St. Paul, in which each new franchise would begin play as its respective new arena was completed. The birth of the new franchise marked NHL hockey's return to Georgia after the Atlanta Flames, established in 1972, departed for Canada in 1980 to become the Calgary Flames. The Flames had been the League's first foray into the southern U.S., and their move discouraged further efforts to bring NHL hockey south of Washington for another decade.

The nickname "Thrashers," after Georgia's state bird, the brown thrasher, was selected from a fan poll. "Thrashers" had actually been runner-up to "Flames" in the poll (as an homage to the old Atlanta Flames), and Philips Arena, the Thrashers' new home, was built on the site of the former Omni, which had been home to the Flames. By coincidence, the first encampment (circa 1839) which later became Atlanta was called Thrasherville, and a historical marker of this is located just down from the arena in front of the State Bar of Georgia (the former home of the Federal Reserve Bank of Atlanta). The team was owned by Atlanta-based media mogul Ted Turner, who also owned Major League Baseball's Atlanta Braves and the National Basketball Association's Atlanta Hawks.

=== 1999–2003: The early years ===
The newly formed Thrashers selected Patrik Štefan with the first overall selection and Luke Sellars with the 30th overall pick (second pick of the second round) in the 1999 NHL entry draft. However, the entire 1999 NHL entry draft was a major disappointment for the Thrashers, as all 11 of their draft picks were out of the NHL by the team's last season; Štefan played the most games for the Thrashers (414) from that draft. Their first two picks (Štefan and Sellars) were two of the biggest disappointments in draft history; NHL.com listed Štefan as the worst first overall pick of all-time and Sellars (who played only one NHL game) as the worst 30th overall pick in NHL history. This was a surprise, as not only did the media hype Štefan as a franchise player, but hockey experts also considered then-Thrashers general manager Don Waddell to have excellent scouting ability.

The Thrashers played their first game on October 2, 1999, losing 4–1 to the New Jersey Devils. Team's Captain, Kelly Buchberger,f scored the franchise's first goal in the loss and the team finished their first season in last place in the Southeast Division with 14 wins, 61 losses (including four overtime losses), and seven ties for a total of 39 points.

Atlanta had the second overall pick in the 2000 NHL entry draft; this draft brought better results, as the player chosen with that pick, Dany Heatley, became one of the team's best players. In the 2001 draft the Thrashers had the first overall pick, taking franchise player Ilya Kovalchuk. Both Heatley and Kovalchuk played their first season in the NHL in 2001–02; both were named to the NHL All-Rookie Team and Heatley was awarded the Calder Memorial Trophy as the League's Rookie of the Year.

The early years of the Atlanta Thrashers saw a sharp increase of hockey fans in Atlanta. Ticket sales for Thrashers games averaged at 10,000 per night, many of them being season tickets. A section of the arena was dedicated to season ticket holders that called themselves the "Nasty Nest". The "Nasty Nest" chanted and shouted at the opposing team to disrupt them. The Thrashers also had two Thrasher bird heads that faced opposite to the scoreboard. The Thrasher heads opened their beaks to reveal a flamethrower that ignited when the team scored a goal. At this time, the franchise adopted a motto "Believe in Blueland", which was often used in advertising.

At the same time, however, the Thrashers were hamstrung by Turner's reluctance to spend the money it took to make them competitive. According to veteran forward Ray Ferraro, who played for the Thrashers during their first three seasons, Waddell told him that Turner treated the Thrashers mostly as an afterthought; they were allocated whatever money was left over after Turner allocated payroll for the Braves and Hawks.

Marcel Comeau was named director of amateur scouting for the Thrashers, on July 9, 2003, and stayed in the role until the team was sold.

=== 2003–2005: The Atlanta Spirit years and the NHL lockout ===
Turner stepped down as vice chairman of AOL Time Warner, parent company of Turner's Turner Broadcasting System, in 2003. A year later, AOL Time Warner sold both teams to Atlanta Spirit, LLC, a group consisting of businessmen based both in Atlanta and elsewhere.

It later emerged that Atlanta Spirit almost immediately put the Thrashers on the market, which only came to light after one of a myriad of lawsuits involving the consortium.

Tragedy struck the team just eight days after the sale, as star forward Dany Heatley crashed his Ferrari in a one-car accident that seriously injured both himself and Thrashers center Dan Snyder. Heatley suffered a broken jaw and arm, a sprained wrist and a torn anterior cruciate ligament (ACL) and medial collateral ligament (MCL); Snyder died five days later due to septic shock from his injuries. The Thrashers dedicated their entire 2003–04 season to Snyder's memory, and Thrashers players wore black patches with Snyder's number, 37, on their jerseys for the season. Heatley's blood alcohol content was below the legal limit, but his combination of speeding (he was driving an estimated 80 miles per hour) and recklessness led to criminal charges, which were later dropped. He eventually received three years' probation and community service.

Led by captain Shawn McEachern, the Thrashers jumped quickly out of the gate with some notable highlights. Ilya Kovalchuk scored eight goals in the first seven games, including two hat-tricks, one in a 7–2 rout of the Chicago Blackhawks and another in a come-from-behind victory against the Nashville Predators. Those comeback victories became a recurring sight throughout the season, as Atlanta pulled off stunning upsets over the Toronto Maple Leafs, Boston Bruins and Ottawa Senators, as well as wins against the Los Angeles Kings and New York Islanders.

Eleven games into the season, the Thrashers were in first place in the Southeast Division and the NHL. Although they continued to play well, they could not keep up with the Tampa Bay Lightning, the eventual Stanley Cup champions, or other teams in the league. Boxing Day of 2003 marked both a bright and dark day for the Thrashers. On that day, Heatley skated for the first time since his car accident with Snyder, but it also marked the last win for the Thrashers before an extended losing streak. From December, 28 2003, to February 11, 2004, the team went with a dismal 2–16–3 record. Kovalchuk became only the second Thrashers' player to score in the NHL All-Star Game after Heatley.

While the Thrashers' playoff hopes were done for the year, they finished second in the Southeast Division to Tampa Bay and tenth in the Eastern Conference, only a handful of wins away from the Stanley Cup playoffs. Kovalchuk tied for the league lead in goals (41) with the Calgary Flames' Jarome Iginla and Rick Nash of the Columbus Blue Jackets. Goaltender Kari Lehtonen began his NHL career with four wins in four starts, including one shutout.

=== 2005–06: Post-lockout ===
Before the start of the 2005–06 season, the Thrashers signed several NHL veterans in the hopes of making the playoffs, including forwards Bobby Holík and Scott Mellanby, defenseman Jaroslav Modrý and goaltender Mike Dunham. At the same time, however, they lost one of their brightest stars, as Heatley requested a trade in an attempt to leave behind memories of his tragic 2003 car accident. He was eventually swapped to the Ottawa Senators in exchange for Marián Hossa (a four-time 30-goal scorer at the time of the trade) and Greg de Vries.

The 2005–06 season saw the Thrashers win a club-record 41 games, even with numerous goaltending injuries. Only a few minutes into the first game of the season, Kari Lehtonen pulled his groin, an injury that would keep him out for a good portion of the season. Veteran backup Mike Dunham, an experienced number-one netminder, stepped in, but also promptly injured himself only a few games later; this left only prospects Michael Garnett and Adam Berkhoel to tend goal. Journeyman goaltender Steve Shields was signed, but he too was injured within 10 games. On April 6, 2006, Lehtonen was run into by Tampa Bay's Chris Dingman, injuring him yet again. The remainder of the season was left to Dunham. Garnett was injured in a game against the Washington Capitals. Dunham, who had started the game but was relieved by the young rookie after poor play, was forced back into action in the third period.

=== 2006–07: Brief success and only playoff appearance ===
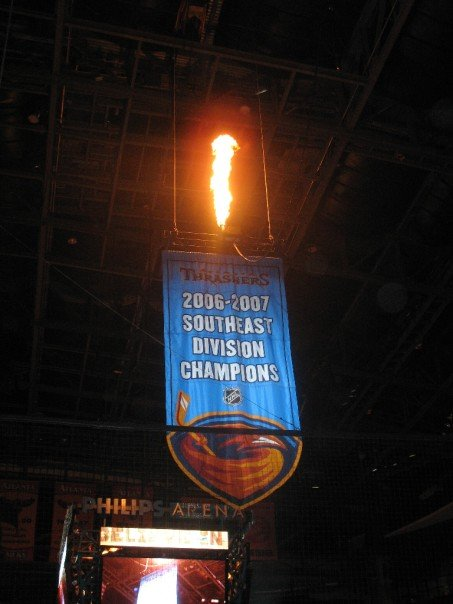
Banner in Philips Arena honoring the Thrashers' sole division championship in 2006–07.

The Thrashers' 2006–07 season began with the highest expectations in franchise history, even after the team's second-leading scorer, Marc Savard, departed as a free agent for the Boston Bruins. Veteran centers Steve Rucchin and Niko Kapanen, and winger Jon Sim were acquired in an effort to make up for the Savard loss. With NHL superstars Marián Hossa and Ilya Kovalchuk, as well as a healthy goaltender in Kari Lehtonen, the Thrashers clinched their first (and only) playoff berth, winning the Southeast Division title with 43 wins and claiming the third seed in the conference and home-ice advantage in the first round of the 2007 Stanley Cup playoffs. However, they were eliminated from the playoffs on April 18, 2007, being swept by the New York Rangers in four straight games in the conference quarterfinals.

This season was the highest attended the Thrashers ever had, with every home playoff game sold out as well as the season opening and closing games. The team was gaining attention within the league for their playoff debut, and team popularity within Atlanta reached an all-time high. Atlanta-based hip hop artist Lil Jon publicly showed his support for the team, posing for a picture with the Stanley Cup while wearing a Thrashers jersey. After this season, the Thrashers' ticket sales would start dwindling due to the housing market crash of 2008, and a stale economy in Atlanta. It did not help matters that the great majority of Thrashers fans lived in Atlanta's northern suburbs, and were not willing to brave Atlanta's infamous traffic to go to games at Philips Arena.

=== 2007–2010: Struggles ===
Just months after reaching the playoffs for the first time, the Thrashers began the 2007–08 season 0–6. Consequently, they fired head coach Bob Hartley on October 17, 2007, with general manager Don Waddell taking over behind the bench on an interim basis. The Thrashers ended the season with only 76 points, finishing 14th in the Eastern Conference.

On January 27, 2008, the Thrashers hosted the NHL All-Star Game at Philips Arena, matching the Eastern Conference All-Stars against the Western Conference All-Stars. The game had originally been scheduled for the 2004–05 season, but the NHL lockout of that season, followed by the 2006 Winter Olympics the following season and the Dallas Stars hosting of the 2007 NHL All-Star Game, made 2008 the earliest available date. The Eastern Conference won the game 8–7, with former Thrasher Marc Savard scoring the game winner late in the third period.

On June 20, 2008, John Anderson was named as the fourth head coach in Thrashers history. In his first season, the Thrashers matched their previous season with 76 points, while finishing 13th in the Eastern Conference. Simultaneously, Atlanta Spirit, LLC, the team's ownership group, was coming apart at the seams. A dispute between Steve Belkin and his seven fellow owners dated back to 2005; Belkin claimed the other owners breached their contract, giving him the right to buy them out at cost, while his partners said they should be able to buy out Belkin's 30% stake. On November 3, court proceedings began in Maryland to decide the group's fate.

In the final year of his contract, Ilya Kovalchuk and the Thrashers could not come to an agreement on an extension. General manager Don Waddell reportedly offered 12-year, $101 million and seven-year, $70 million contracts, both of which Kovalchuk turned down. Rather than potentially losing him to free agency in the off-season, the team traded Kovalchuk on February 4, 2010, to the New Jersey Devils. Atlanta received defenseman Johnny Oduya, rookie forward Niclas Bergfors, junior prospect Patrice Cormier and a first-round pick in the 2010 NHL entry draft in exchange for Kovalchuk and defenseman Anssi Salmela; the teams also traded second-round selections in 2010. The Thrashers finished 10th in the conference, with 83 points, which would be the most points they had earned in a regular season from the time they won the division title in 2006–07 to the team's move in the summer of 2011.

=== 2010–11: The final season in Atlanta ===
On April 14, 2010, three days after the finish of the 2009–10 season and after two unsuccessful attempts at making the playoffs, the contracts of head coach John Anderson and his coaching staff were not renewed. General manager Don Waddell was promoted to president of hockey operations, while former assistant general manager Rick Dudley took Waddell's place as general manager. This was the only general manager change in Thrashers history.

Dudley made his first trade on June 23, involving nine players and draft picks, with the Chicago Blackhawks. The Thrashers received Dustin Byfuglien, Ben Eager, Brent Sopel and Akim Aliu in exchange for Marty Reasoner, Joey Crabb, Jeremy Morin, the Devils' first-round pick (24th overall) in 2010 and the Devils' second-round pick (54th overall) in 2010. Later, the Thrashers also traded for Blackhawks' Andrew Ladd, while sending prospect Ivan Vishnevskiy and a draft pick to Chicago. The Blackhawks, the 2010 Stanley Cup champions, found it necessary to trade players for prospects and picks as they were in difficulty with the salary cap.

The next day, the team named Craig Ramsay as the team's new head coach. Ramsay, who had been an assistant coach for the Boston Bruins for the previous three seasons, was a former NHL player who had been a teammate of Rick Dudley's on the Buffalo Sabres. In the following weeks, the Thrashers hired an associate coach, John Torchetti, and an assistant coach, Mike Stothers. The team also hired Clint Malarchuk as a goaltending consultant.

The Thrashers' last win came against the New York Rangers, 3–0 at Madison Square Garden on April 7, 2011. On April 10, the Thrashers played their last game in Atlanta against the Pittsburgh Penguins. Tim Stapleton scored the last goal in Thrashers history in a 5–2 loss to Pittsburgh. The final NHL goal scored in Philips Arena was tallied by the Penguins' Mike Comrie, an empty-net goal and his first of the season.

=== Sale and move ===
Financial losses and ownership struggles drew suitors who sought to move the team to Kansas City, Portland, Quebec City, Hamilton, or Winnipeg. On January 22, 2011, the team's ownership group claimed it had lost US$130 million in the last six years, partially because of a lawsuit by former partner Steve Belkin. In February 2011, majority owner Michael Gearon stated that the team would seek new investors. Various local groups announced their intent to purchase the franchise and keep it in Atlanta.

On May 16, The Atlanta Journal-Constitution reported that talks for a sale to the Winnipeg-based True North Sports & Entertainment were underway. According to The Globe and Mail, a deal was finalized on May 20, to move the team to Winnipeg. The NHL later denied the report, but acknowledged that advanced negotiations between the two teams were underway and that NHL Commissioner Gary Bettman supported the move. Draft schedules were prepared that accommodated for the team's move to Winnipeg, as True North sought to move the Manitoba Moose of the American Hockey League (AHL), eventually moving the team to St. John's, Newfoundland and Labrador, in Atlantic Canada, playing as the St. John's IceCaps. However, the IceCaps were eventually moved back to Winnipeg in 2015.

On May 31, True North Sports & Entertainment and the NHL held a press conference in Winnipeg to announce the completion of a deal to purchase the Thrashers. True North intended to move the team to the MTS Centre in Winnipeg on June 21, to become the new Winnipeg Jets. The sale and move of the team were formally approved by the NHL's Board of Governors. The Atlanta Spirit Group, however, retained the rights of the name and logos for the Thrashers, which are expected to be used by any future Atlanta NHL franchise that may be established or move there.

The last Atlanta Thrashers player on the Winnipeg Jets' active roster was Blake Wheeler, who left the franchise after the 2022–23 season. As of the 2026–27 season, Zach Bogosian of the Minnesota Wild is the last active player to have played for the Thrashers. Ben Chiarot of the Detroit Red Wings is the only other player drafted by the Thrashers still active in the NHL, although he did not enter the league until after the Thrashers moved to Winnipeg.

Atlanta was not without professional ice hockey for long. In 2015, the Gwinnett Gladiators of the ECHL changed their name to the Atlanta Gladiators to include the Atlanta metropolitan area. The team plays in Duluth, Georgia, located northeast of Atlanta and the Gladiators honored the Thrashers legacy on December 16, 2022, by wearing the original blue jerseys first worn in 1999 against the Greenville Swamp Rabbits, in which Greenville won 5–4 in overtime.

== Team information ==
=== Jerseys ===
Throughout the team's tenure in Atlanta, the Thrashers' wore jerseys of ice blue, navy blue, red, gold and white.

In 2003, the Thrashers unveiled an alternate home jersey. Predominantly blue, it featured a black yoke on the right shoulder with the word 'ATLANTA' inside. In 2006, it became the team's full-time home jersey, replacing the original navy blue jersey that had been worn since the club's inception in 1999.

In 2007, Reebok released new team jerseys as part of the rollout of the Reebok Edge Uniform System. For the Thrashers' jerseys, the waist stripes were removed from the home and road jerseys and piping was added.

Atlanta unveiled its new third jersey, red and midnight blue with white and gold trim, on October 10, 2008. It is often mocked as one of the worst uniforms in league history.

On November 7, 2022, the Thrashers' former ECHL affiliate, the Atlanta Gladiators, unveiled plans to take on the identity of the Thrashers for a single game on December 16.

=== Mascot ===
The team's mascot was Thrash, a brown thrasher, which also is the official state bird of Georgia.

== Players and personnel ==
=== Team captains ===
- Kelly Buchberger, 1999–2000
- Steve Staios, 2000–2001
- Ray Ferraro, 2001–2002
- Shawn McEachern, 2002–2004
- Scott Mellanby, 2005–2007
- Bobby Holík, 2007–2008
- Ilya Kovalchuk, 2009–2010
- Andrew Ladd, 2010–2011

=== Hall of Famers ===
- Chris Chelios
- Marián Hossa
- Mark Recchi
- Keith Tkachuk

=== Retired numbers ===
The Thrashers never officially retired any numbers, however, No. 37 was unofficially taken out of circulation after the death of Thrasher Dan Snyder in September 2003. No. 99 was retired league-wide by the NHL during the 2000 NHL All-Star Game to honor Wayne Gretzky.

=== General managers ===
- Don Waddell (1999–2010)
- Rick Dudley (2010–2011)

== Franchise records ==
=== Scoring leaders ===
These are the top-ten point, goal, and assist scorers in franchise history.

Note: Pos = Position; GP = Games played; G = Goals; A = Assists; Pts = Points; P/G = Points per game; G/G = Goals per game; A/G = Assists per game

Points
Player	Pos	GP	G	A	Pts	P/G
Ilya Kovalchuk	LW	594	328	287	615	1.04
Vyacheslav Kozlov	LW	537	145	271	416	0.77
Marián Hossa	RW	222	108	140	248	1.11
Marc Savard	C	184	63	133	196	1.07
Dany Heatley	RW	190	80	101	181	0.95
Patrik Štefan	C	414	59	118	177	0.43
Tobias Enström	D	318	26	145	171	0.54
Bryan Little	C	282	68	81	149	0.53
Ray Ferraro	C	223	56	91	147	0.66
Todd White	C	221	43	93	136	0.61

Goals
Player	Pos	G
Ilya Kovalchuk	LW	328
Vyacheslav Kozlov	LW	145
Marián Hossa	RW	108
Dany Heatley	RW	80
Bryan Little	C	68
Marc Savard	C	63
Patrik Štefan	C	59
Ray Ferraro	C	56
Rich Peverley	C	49
Jim Slater	C	47

Assists
Player	Pos	A
Ilya Kovalchuk	LW	287
Vyacheslav Kozlov	LW	271
Tobias Enström	D	145
Marián Hossa	RW	140
Marc Savard	C	133
Patrik Štefan	C	118
Dany Heatley	RW	101
Todd White	C	93
Ray Ferraro	C	91
František Kaberle	D	82

=== Single-season leaders ===
- Most goals in a season: Ilya Kovalchuk, 52 (2005–06, 2007–08)
- Most assists in a season: Marc Savard, 69 (2005–06)
- Most points in a season: Marián Hossa, 100 (2006–07)
- Most penalty minutes in a season: Jeff Odgers, 226 (2000–01)
- Most goals in a season, defenseman: Dustin Byfuglien, 20 (2010–11)
- Most points in a season, defenseman: Dustin Byfuglien, 53 (2010–11)
- Most goals in a season, rookie: Ilya Kovalchuk, 29 (2001–02)
- Most assists in a season, rookie: Dany Heatley, 41 (2001–02)
- Most points in a season, rookie: Dany Heatley, 67 (2001–02)
- Most wins in a season: Kari Lehtonen, 34 (2006–07)

== Awards and trophies ==
Calder Memorial Trophy

- Dany Heatley: 2001–02

Rocket Richard Trophy

- Ilya Kovalchuk: 2003–04 (shared with Jarome Iginla of the Calgary Flames and Rick Nash of the Columbus Blue Jackets)

=== Georgia's Own Credit Union 3 Stars of the Year Award ===
The Georgia's Own Credit Union 3 Stars of the Year Award was awarded annually to the Thrashers player amassing the most points throughout the season by being named as one of the three stars of each game. The award was created in the Thrashers' inaugural season of 1999.

==== Winners ====
- 1999–2000: Ray Ferraro
- 2000–01: Ray Ferraro
- 2001–02: Dany Heatley and Milan Hnilička
- 2002–03: Dany Heatley
- 2003–04: Ilya Kovalchuk
- 2004–05: not awarded due to NHL lockout
- 2005–06: Marián Hossa
- 2006–07: Marián Hossa
- 2007–08: Ilya Kovalchuk
- 2008–09: Ilya Kovalchuk
- 2009–10: Johan Hedberg
- 2010–11: Ondřej Pavelec

== Media ==
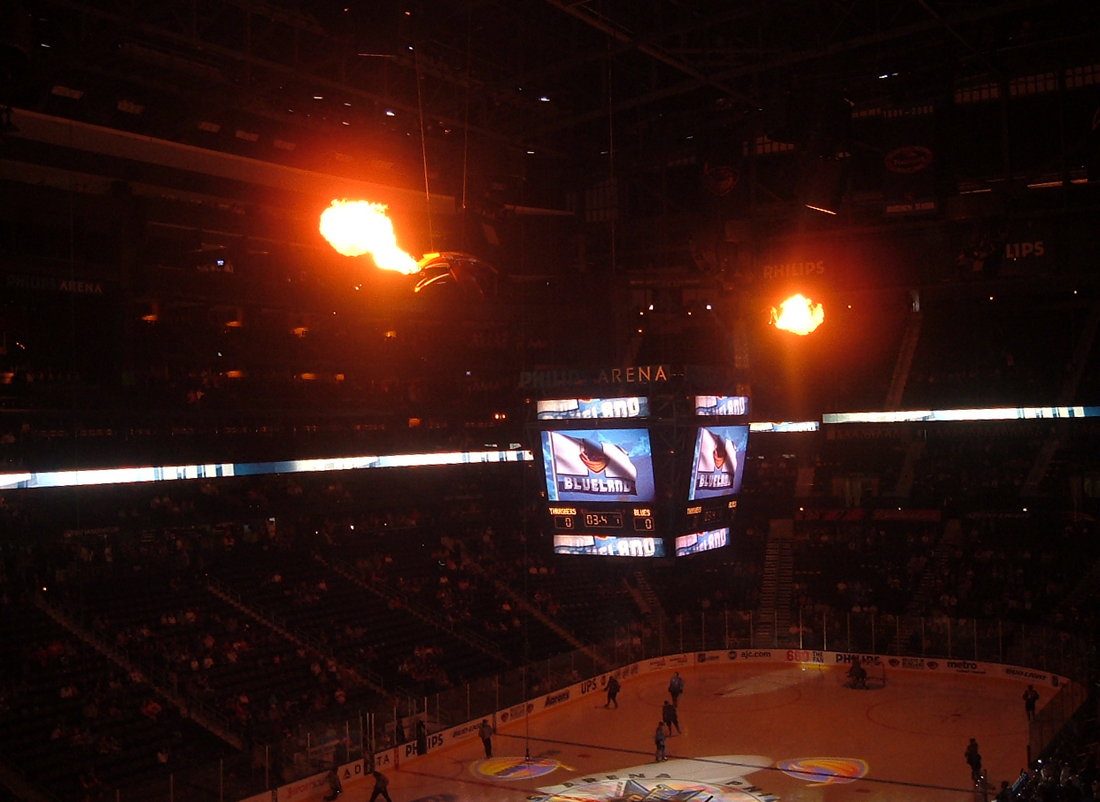
The giant fire-breathing birdheads at Philips Arena, lit when the players were introduced before the game and when the Thrashers scored a goal

The Atlanta Thrashers were broadcast on cable television on SportSouth and Fox Sports South. Over-the-air, the Thrashers were broadcast on WUPA (channel 69) (1999–2004) and WPXA (channel 14) (2005–2007). Radio coverage included play-by-play of all games on WCNN in Atlanta. The station was the flagship of a network that included 18 stations. Most were in Georgia, but there were two affiliates in South Carolina and one in Alabama. The radio play-by-play voice for the first season was Scott Ferrall, followed by Dan Kamal.

=== Radio ===
Play-by-play

- Scott Ferrall, 1999–2000
- Dan Kamal, 2000–2011

Color commentators

- Dan Kamal, 1999–2000
- Billy Jaffe, 2000–2006
- Jeff Odgers, 2006–2008
- None, 2008–2011

=== Television ===
Play-by-play

- Matt McConnell, 1999–2003
- JP Dellacamera, 2004–2007
- Matt McConnell, 2008–2011

Colour commentators

- Darren Eliot, 1999–2011
