= Boris Valábik =

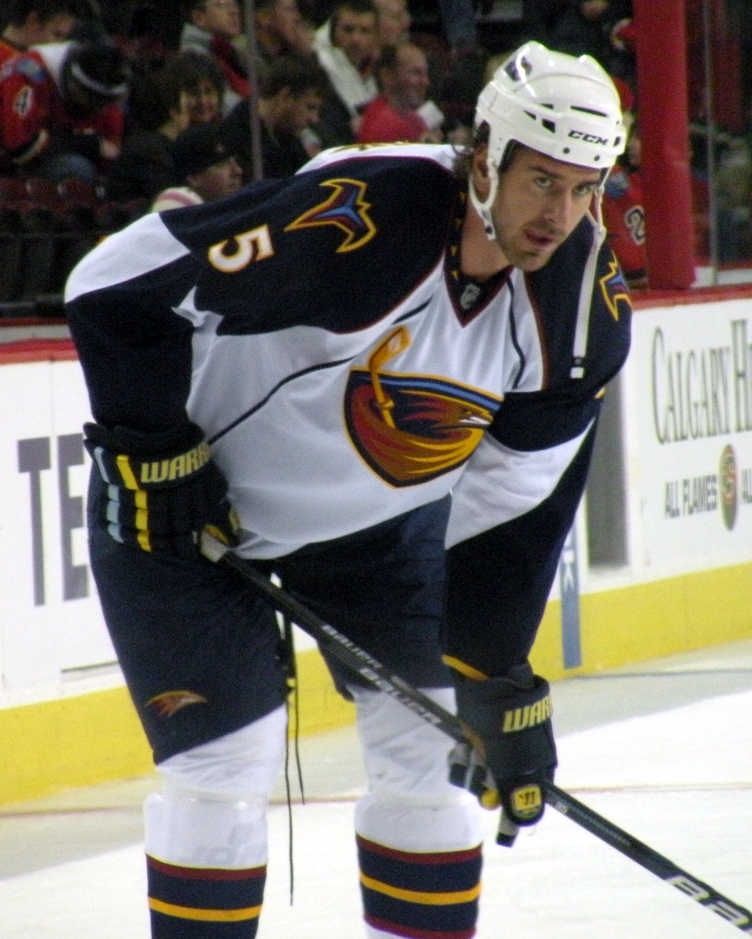
- Valábik with the Atlanta Thrashers in 2009
- Born: February 14, 1986 (age 40) Nitra, Czechoslovakia
- Height: 6 ft 7 in (201 cm)
- Weight: 245 lb (111 kg; 17 st 7 lb)
- Position: Defence
- Shot: Left
- Played for: Atlanta Thrashers
- National team: Slovakia
- NHL draft: 10th overall, 2004; Atlanta Thrashers
- Playing career: 2006–2017

Boris Valábik (born February 14, 1986) is a Slovak former professional ice hockey defenceman, retired police officer and currently, columnist, television presenter. Valábik was drafted in the first round, tenth overall, of the 2004 NHL entry draft by the Atlanta Thrashers and played 80 regular season games for the Thrashers.

== Junior hockey ==
=== Kitchener Rangers (2003–2006) ===
After playing the 2002–03 season with HC Nitra U-20 team in his hometown of Nitra, Valábik was drafted by the Kitchener Rangers of the Ontario Hockey League (OHL) in the first round, 48th overall, in the 2003 CHL Import Draft.

Valábik played in his first career OHL game on September 19, 2003, as he was held pointless in a 10–4 victory over the Plymouth Whalers. He earned his first career OHL point on October 17, 2003, an assist in a 6–2 loss to the Owen Sound Attack. Valábik scored his first career OHL goal on November 7, 2003, against Josh Disher of the Erie Otters in an 8–1 win. He finished the 2003–04 season with 3 goals and 16 points in 68 games, as well as accumulating 118 penalty minutes, helping the Rangers make the playoffs. In the post-season, Valábik was held pointless in five games as Kitchener were eliminated by the Plymouth Whalers in the Western Conference quarter-finals. After the season, Valábik was named to the OHL All-Rookie Team.

Valábik struggled offensively in the 2004–05 season, as he earned only 4 assists in 43 games during the season, as well as recording 231 penalty minutes. In 15 playoff games, Valábik was held off the scoresheet, as the Rangers eventually lost to the London Knights in the Western Conference finals.

Valábik returned to Kitchener for his final season in 2005–06, where in 52 games, he scored 1 goal and 10 points, as well as accumulated 216 penalty minutes, as Kitchener made the post-season once again. In the playoffs, Valábik recorded two assists in five games as the club lost to the Owen Sound Attack in the Western Conference quarter-finals.

== Professional career ==
=== Atlanta Thrashers (2004–2011) ===
Valábik was drafted by the Atlanta Thrashers in the first round, tenth overall, of the 2004 NHL entry draft. For the 2004–05 and the 2005–06 seasons, the Thrashers returned Valábik to the Kitchener Rangers. On March 30, 2006, he signed an entry-level contract with Atlanta to begin his professional career.

The Thrashers assigned Valábik to the Chicago Wolves of the American Hockey League (AHL) for the 2006–07 season. He played in his first career AHL game on October 7, 2006, also registering his first point (an assist), in a 5–0 win over the Peoria Rivermen. In his next game, on October 13, Valábik scored his first career AHL goal, against Karl Goehring of the Milwaukee Admirals in a 7–5 victory. He finished the season playing in 50 games with Chicago, scoring 2 goals and 9 points, helping the Wolves clinch a playoff spot. In the playoffs, Valábik had one assist in eight games as the Wolves lost to the Iowa Stars in the West Division finals.

Valábik began the 2007–08 season with the Wolves, where in 58 games, he had 1 goal and 8 points. On March 17, 2008, the Thrashers called Valábik up to Atlanta, and two days later, on March 19, Valábik appeared in his first career NHL game, going pointless in a 5–3 loss to the Carolina Hurricanes. He finished the 2007–08 season with Atlanta, registering no points in seven games. He was then sent back to the Wolves for their Calder Cup playoff run. On April 26, 2008, Valábik scored his first career AHL playoff goal, against Pekka Rinne of the Milwaukee Admirals in a 3–0 victory. Overall, Valábik appeared in 24 playoff games with Chicago, scoring 3 goals and 4 points as the Wolves ultimately won the Calder Cup.

Valábik began the 2008–09 season with the Wolves. In 11 games, he scored 1 goal and 3 points. In November, the Thrashers called Valábik up for the remainder of the season. He earned his first career NHL point on December 10, 2008, an assist in a 3–2 loss to the New York Rangers. He finished the season playing in 50 games with Atlanta, recording 5 assists and 132 penalty minutes. On July 20, 2009, he re-signed with the Thrashers.

Valábik began the 2009–10 season with the Wolves. He suffered an ankle injury in a practice before the season, however, and missed the first six weeks of the season. Valábik returned to the lineup on November 20, 2009, and would play in six games with Chicago, earning no points, before being called up to Atlanta again. With the Thrashers, he appeared in 23 games, earning 2 assists. His 2009–10 season ended in early February after he tore his anterior cruciate ligament (ACL).

On October 15, 2010, the Thrashers placed Valábik on waivers, which he cleared, allowing him to be sent back to the Wolves. In 49 games with Chicago, he had 9 assists. On February 18, 2011, the Thrashers traded Valábik and forward Rich Peverley to the Boston Bruins in exchange for forward Blake Wheeler and defenceman Mark Stuart.

=== Boston Bruins (2010–2011) ===
Valábik finished the 2010–11 season with the Boston Bruins' AHL affiliate, the Providence Bruins. In ten games with Providence, he had two assists. After the season, Valábik became an unrestricted free agent.

=== Pittsburgh Penguins (2011–2012) ===
On July 3, 2011, Valábik signed a one-year contract with the Pittsburgh Penguins. On October 3, he suffered a knee injury at a Penguins practice, and on November 2, the Penguins placed Valábik on waivers. He cleared waivers and was assigned to the Wilkes-Barre/Scranton Penguins, the Penguins' AHL affiliate. He would only play in three games for the club in the 2011–12 season, earning no points. After the season, Valábik once again became a free agent.

=== Kometa Brno (2012–2013) ===
On August 14, 2012, as a free agent, Valábik signed with Kometa Brno of the Czech Extraliga. In 29 games, he had 1 goal and 3 points. In early January 2013, Valábik asked to be released from his contract with the club.

=== Portland Pirates (2012–2013) ===
On January 11, 2013, Valábik returned to North America to sign with the AHL's Portland Pirates. In 24 games with Portland, he had 2 goals and 6 points, helping the team reach the playoffs. He appeared in one playoff game, being held off the scoresheet, while earning 17 penalty minutes, as the Pirates lost to the Syracuse Crunch in the Eastern Conference quarter-finals.

=== Coventry Blaze ===
Valábik signed for the Coventry Blaze at the start of the 2015–16 season. He was subsequently named an alternate captain.

== Post-retirement ==
After his retirement, Valábik transitioned into a television personality. In 2023, he competed in Let's Dance. In September 2024, Valábik was announced as a sport news presenter at TV JOJ. He also became a face of multiple advertising campaigns for various brands including Hochwald Milch Eiskaffee brand or Fortuna.

== Awards and achievements ==
- 2003–04 OHL First All-Rookie Team
- 2003–04 CHL All-Rookie Team
- 2003–04 CHL Top Prospects Game
- 2007–08 AHL Calder Cup (Chicago Wolves)

== Career statistics ==
=== Regular season and playoffs ===
			Regular season					Playoffs
Season	Team	League	GP	G	A	Pts	PIM	GP	G	A	Pts	PIM
2002–03	MHC Nitra	SVK U20	46	2	12	14	145	—	—	—	—	—
2003–04	Kitchener Rangers	OHL	68	3	12	15	278	5	0	0	0	8
2004–05	Kitchener Rangers	OHL	43	0	4	4	231	15	0	0	0	56
2005–06	Kitchener Rangers	OHL	36	1	5	6	138	—	—	—	—	—
2006–07	Chicago Wolves	AHL	50	2	7	9	184	8	0	1	1	37
2007–08	Chicago Wolves	AHL	58	1	7	8	229	24	3	1	4	71
2007–08	Atlanta Thrashers	NHL	7	0	0	0	42	—	—	—	—	—
2008–09	Chicago Wolves	AHL	11	1	2	3	21	—	—	—	—	—
2008–09	Atlanta Thrashers	NHL	50	0	5	5	132	—	—	—	—	—
2009–10	Atlanta Thrashers	NHL	23	0	2	2	36	—	—	—	—	—
2009–10	Chicago Wolves	AHL	6	0	0	0	10	—	—	—	—	—
2010–11	Chicago Wolves	AHL	49	0	9	9	165	—	—	—	—	—
2010–11	Providence Bruins	AHL	10	0	2	2	24	—	—	—	—	—
2011–12	Wilkes–Barre/Scranton Penguins	AHL	3	0	0	0	7	—	—	—	—	—
2012–13	HC Kometa Brno	ELH	29	1	2	3	106	—	—	—	—	—
2012–13	Portland Pirates	AHL	24	2	4	6	92	1	0	0	0	17
2013–14	ŠHK 37 Piešťany	SVK	18	1	4	5	50	—	—	—	—	—
2014–15	Arystan Temirtau	KAZ	10	1	1	2	18	—	—	—	—	—
2014–15	Arlan Kokshetau	KAZ	25	3	16	19	102	8	0	1	1	36
2015–16	Coventry Blaze	GBR	42	1	7	8	339	4	0	0	0	10
2016–17	EHC Lustenau	AlpsHL	20	1	3	4	54	—	—	—	—	—
AHL totals			211	6	31	37	732	33	3	2	5	125
NHL totals			80	0	7	7	210	—	—	—	—	—

=== International ===
Medal record

Representing Slovakia

World Junior U18 Championships
Silver medal – second place	2003 Yaroslavl	Ice hockey

Year	Team	Event	GP	G	A	Pts	PIM
2003	Slovakia	WJC18	7	1	0	1	34
2004	Slovakia	WJC18	6	0	3	3	26
2005	Slovakia	WJC	6	0	1	1	20
2006	Slovakia	WJC	6	1	5	6	32
2009	Slovakia	WC	6	0	0	0	16
Junior totals			25	2	9	11	112
Senior totals			6	0	0	0	16

Preceded by Braydon Coburn	Atlanta Thrashers first-round draft pick 2004	Succeeded by Alex Bourret
