= Niko Kapanen =

Finnish ice hockey player (born 1978)

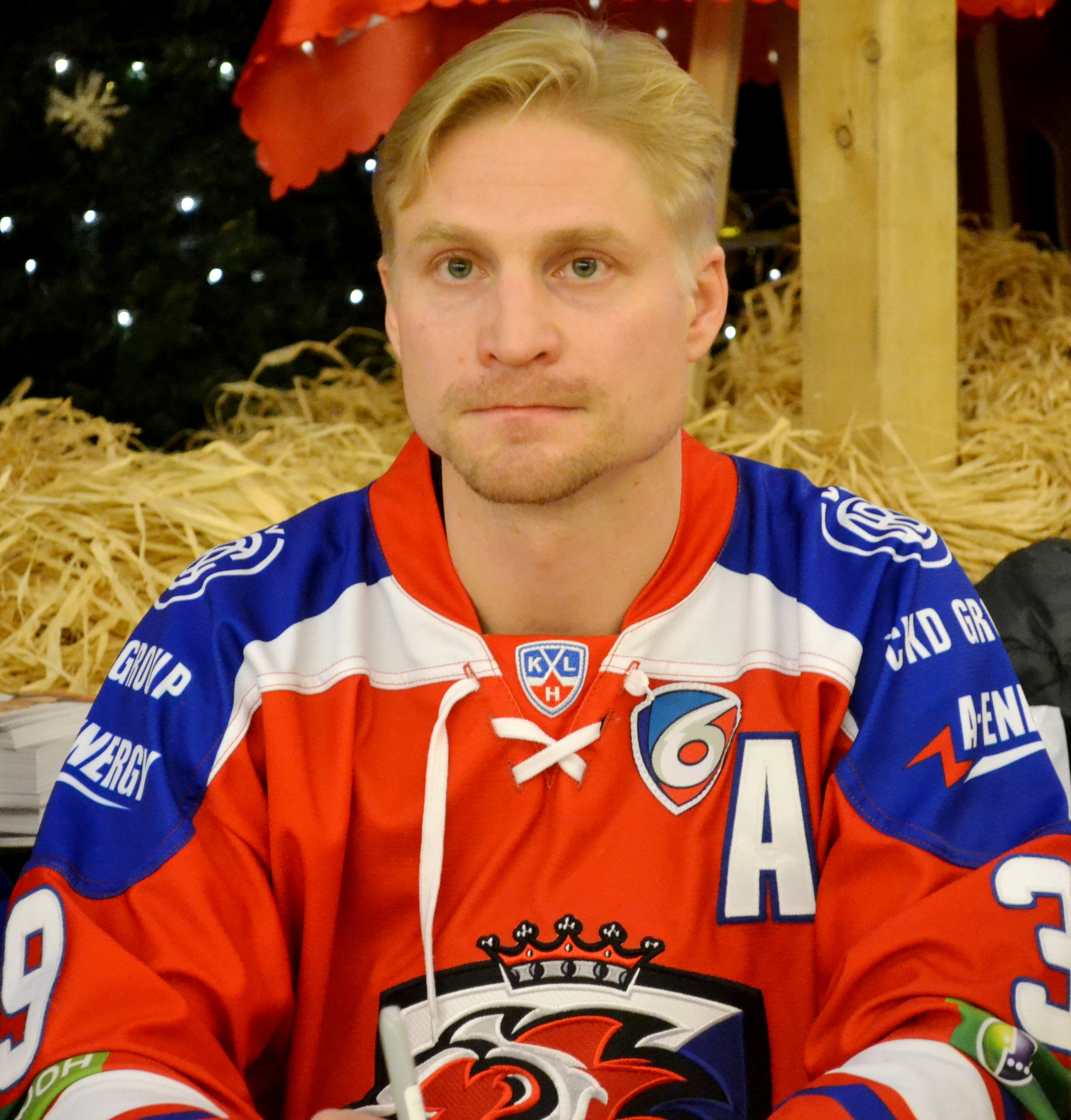
- Born: 29 April 1978 (age 48) Hattula, Finland
- Height: 5 ft 9 in (175 cm)
- Weight: 180 lb (82 kg; 12 st 12 lb)
- Position: Centre
- Shot: Left
- Played for: HPK; TPS; Dallas Stars; EV Zug; Atlanta Thrashers; Phoenix Coyotes; Ak Bars Kazan; HC Lev Praha; Jokerit
- National team: Finland
- NHL draft: 173rd overall, 1998; Dallas Stars
- Playing career: 1996–2017

Niko Klaus Petteri Kapanen (born 29 April 1978) is a Finnish former professional ice hockey centre, who last played for HPK of the Finnish Liiga.

== Playing career ==
Kapanen was drafted by the Dallas Stars in the 6th round as the 173rd overall pick in the 1998 NHL entry draft. During the 2005–06 season, Kapanen recorded a career high in goals (14) and points (35). He scored his first career hat-trick on February 9, 2006, against the Phoenix Coyotes in a 5–1 victory.

On June 24, 2006, Kapanen was traded by the Stars to the Atlanta Thrashers, along with 7th-round draft pick in 2006, for defenceman Jaroslav Modrý and centerman Patrik Štefan. During his first season with the Thrashers, Kapanen was picked up off the waiver list by the Phoenix Coyotes.

On June 9, 2008, Kapanen left the NHL and signed for Ak Bars Kazan of the Kontinental Hockey League.

After five seasons with Ak Bars, Kapanen left as a free agent to sign a multi-year contract with Czech club HC Lev Praha of the KHL on August 11, 2013. Hampered by injury, Kapanen had a less than successful regular 2013–14 season with Praha, but redeemed himself in playoffs to post 11 points in 21 games as Lev reached the Gagarin Cup finals.

Kapanen association with Lev was ended after one-year upon the club announcing financial bankruptcy. On July 10, 2014, Kapanen signed a one-year contract with new Finnish KHL entrant, Jokerit.

== International play ==
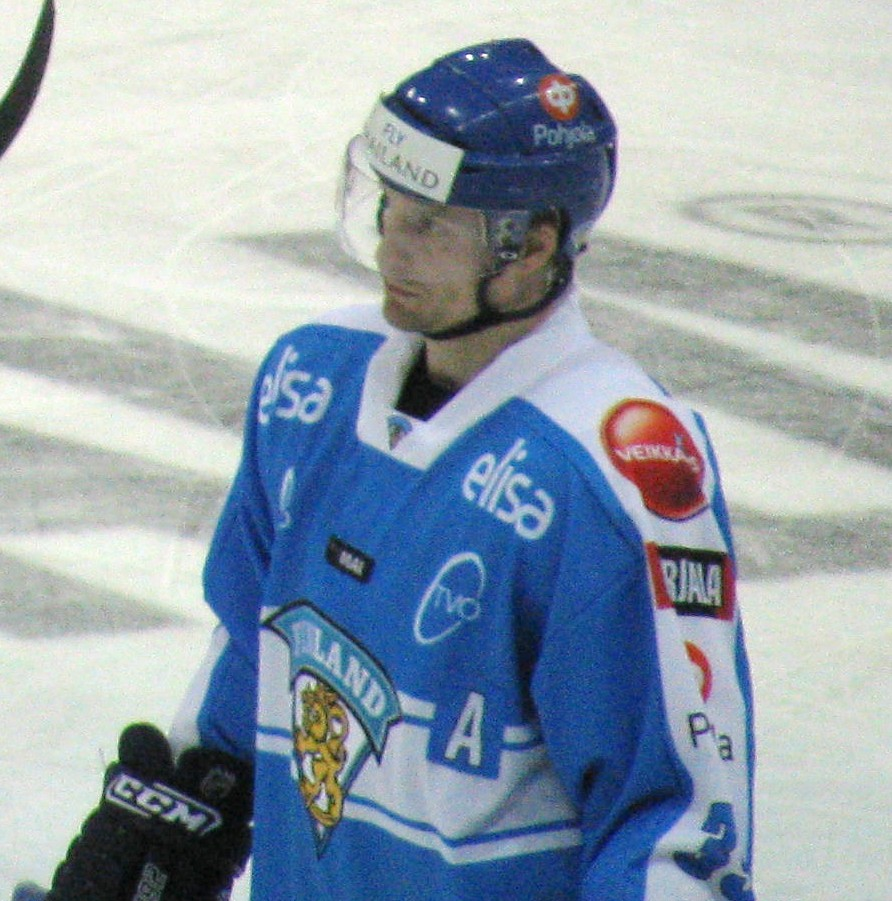

Medal record

Men's ice hockey

Representing Finland

Olympic Games
Silver medal – second place	2006 Turin	
Bronze medal – third place	2010 Vancouver	

World Championships
Gold medal – first place	2011 Bratislava	
Silver medal – second place	2001 Cologne	
Silver medal – second place	2007 Moscow	
Bronze medal – third place	2000 St Petersburg	
Bronze medal – third place	2008 Quebec City	

World Cup
Silver medal – second place	2004 Canada	

World Junior Championships
Gold medal – first place	1998 Finland	

Kapanen had a highly decorated international career with Finland in collecting a medal at every level played. He made his debut as a junior in the 1997 World Junior Championships, claiming a gold medal at the following junior Championships in 1998. At the senior men's level Kapanen competed in 9 World Championships in capturing 5 medals, including a gold at the 2011 World Championships. He twice represented Finland at the Winter Olympics claiming a Silver and Bronze at the 2006 and 2010 tournaments respectively.

== Career statistics ==
=== Regular season and playoffs ===
			Regular season					Playoffs
Season	Team	League	GP	G	A	Pts	PIM	GP	G	A	Pts	PIM
1994–95	HPK	FIN U18	31	16	19	35	40	—	—	—	—	—
1994–95	HPK	FIN-2 U20	6	3	5	8	0	—	—	—	—	—
1995–96	HPK	FIN U18	10	6	6	12	8	—	—	—	—	—
1995–96	HPK	FIN-2 U20	13	8	15	23	18	13	7	7	14	16
1995–96	HPK	SM-l	7	1	0	1	0	—	—	—	—	—
1996–97	HPK	FIN U20	5	1	7	8	2	2	0	1	1	2
1996–97	HPK	SM-l	41	6	9	15	12	10	4	5	9	2
1997–98	HPK	FIN U20	2	1	1	2	0	—	—	—	—	—
1997–98	HPK	SM-l	48	8	18	26	44	—	—	—	—	—
1998–99	HPK	SM-l	53	14	29	43	49	8	3	4	7	4
1999–00	HPK	SM-l	53	20	28	48	40	8	1	9	10	4
2000–01	TPS	SM-l	56	11	22	33	20	10	2	1	3	0
2001–02	Dallas Stars	NHL	9	0	1	1	2	—	—	—	—	—
2001–02	Utah Grizzlies	AHL	59	13	28	41	40	5	2	1	3	0
2002–03	Dallas Stars	NHL	82	5	29	34	55	12	4	3	7	12
2003–04	Dallas Stars	NHL	67	1	5	6	16	1	1	0	1	0
2004–05	EV Zug	NLA	44	10	33	43	24	9	2	5	7	35
2005–06	Dallas Stars	NHL	81	14	21	35	36	5	0	1	1	10
2006–07	Atlanta Thrashers	NHL	60	4	9	13	20	—	—	—	—	—
2006–07	Phoenix Coyotes	NHL	19	2	7	9	8	—	—	—	—	—
2007–08	Phoenix Coyotes	NHL	79	10	18	28	34	—	—	—	—	—
2008–09	Ak Bars Kazan	KHL	53	12	19	31	22	21	1	9	10	16
2009–10	Ak Bars Kazan	KHL	54	12	15	27	44	22	8	9	17	6
2010–11	Ak Bars Kazan	KHL	53	7	31	38	24	9	2	3	5	12
2011–12	Ak Bars Kazan	KHL	54	12	27	39	24	12	2	4	6	2
2012–13	Ak Bars Kazan	KHL	50	10	18	28	26	18	4	6	10	2
2013–14	HC Lev Praha	KHL	22	8	|12	14	21	2	9	11	29
2013–14	HC Stadion Litoměřice	CZE-2	2	0	0	0	2	—	—	—	—	—
2014–15	Jokerit	KHL	60	9	24	33	55	4	0	2	2	0
2015–16	Jokerit	KHL	53	11	15	26	38	4	1	2	3	8
2016–17	HPK	FIN	49	7	21	28	20	7	0	5	5	4
SM-l/FIN totals			307	67	126	193	185	45	10	24	34	18
KHL totals			399	81	153	234	247	111	20	44	64	75
NHL totals			397	36	90	126	160	18	5	4	9	22

=== International ===
Year	Team	Event	GP	G	A	Pts	PIM
1996	Finland	EJC	5	0	0	0	6
1997	Finland	WJC	6	4	4	8	0
1998	Finland	WJC	7	2	5	7	2
2000	Finland	WC	9	4	3	7	4
2001	Finland	WC	9	3	1	4	8
2002	Finland	WC	9	0	4	4	10
2004	Finland	WC	7	| 2	5	14
2004	Finland	WCH	6	1	2	3	0
2005	Finland	WC	7	1	4	5	8
2006	Finland	OLY	8	2	1	3	2
2007	Finland	WC	9	0	7	7	6
2008	Finland	WC	9	2	5	7	0
2009	Finland	WC	7	7	3	10	0
2010	Finland	OLY	6	0	2	2	0
2011	Finland	WC	9	2	1	3	2
2012	Finland	WC	10	1	1	2	2
Junior totals			18	6	9	15	8
Senior totals			105	26	36	62	58

== Awards and honours ==
Award	Year
NHL
NHL YoungStars Game	2003
KHL
Gagarin Cup (Ak Bars Kazan)	2009, 2010
