= Jaroslav Modrý =

Czech ice hockey player (born 1971)

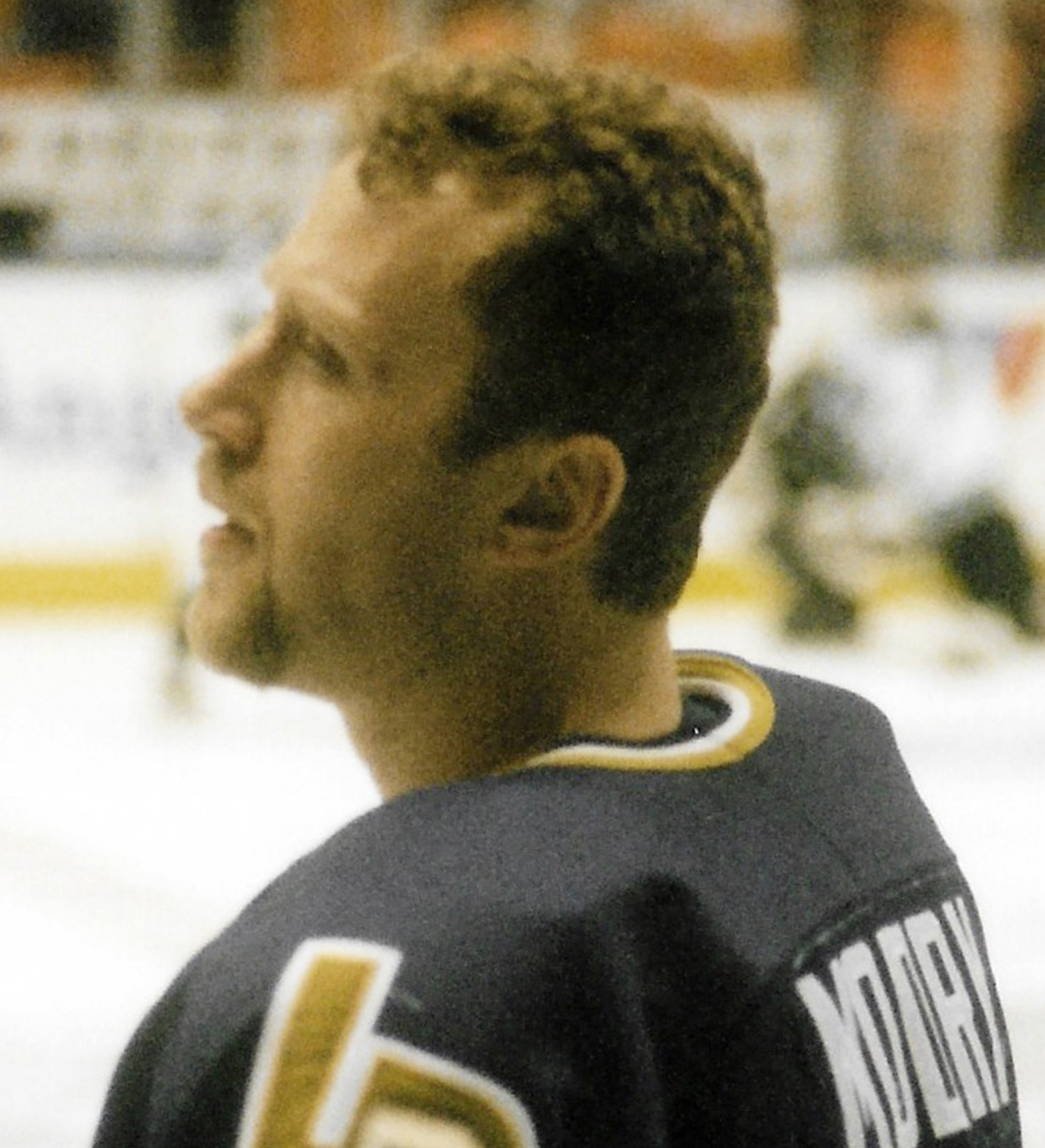
- Modrý during his time with the Long Beach Ice Dogs
- Born: 27 February 1971 (age 55) České Budějovice, Czechoslovakia
- Height: 6 ft 2 in (188 cm)
- Weight: 220 lb (100 kg; 15 st 10 lb)
- Position: Defence
- Shot: Left
- Played for: HC České Budějovice; New Jersey Devils; Ottawa Senators; Los Angeles Kings; Atlanta Thrashers; Dallas Stars; Philadelphia Flyers; HC Liberec; HC Plzeň
- National team: Czechoslovakia and Czech Republic
- NHL draft: 179th overall, 1990; New Jersey Devils
- Playing career: 1988–2012

Jaroslav Modrý (born 27 February 1971) is a Czech former professional ice hockey defenseman who played 13 seasons in the National Hockey League (NHL) for the New Jersey Devils, Ottawa Senators, Los Angeles Kings, Atlanta Thrashers, Dallas Stars, and Philadelphia Flyers.

He is currently an assistant coach in the St. Louis Blues organization with the Springfield Thunderbirds of the AHL.

== Playing career ==
Modrý was selected 179th overall in the ninth round of the 1990 NHL entry draft by the New Jersey Devils. He made his NHL debut with the Devils during the 1993–94 season. A trade to the Ottawa Senators in July 1995 was followed months later in March 1996 by a trade to the Los Angeles Kings. Modrý started seeing more playing time in the NHL and eventually became an NHL regular with the Kings, playing his first full season in 2000–01. The following season, 2001–02, saw Modrý set career highs in assists (38) and points (42) and play in the NHL All-Star Game. He scored a career-high 13 goals in 2002–03.

After the 2003–04 season, Modrý left the Kings as an unrestricted free agent and signed with the Atlanta Thrashers. He returned to the Czech Extraliga and played for HC Liberec during the 2004–05 NHL lockout. After only one season with Atlanta, Modrý was traded along with Patrik Štefan to the Dallas Stars for Niko Kapanen and a 2006 7th round draft pick. After playing half of the 2006–07 season with the Stars, Dallas sent him back to the Kings as part of a deadline-day deal to acquire former Kings teammate Mattias Norström. A year later during the following season, Modrý was on the move again as the Kings traded him to the Philadelphia Flyers for a 2008 3rd round draft pick.

Modrý left the NHL for the Czech Extraliga when he signed a two-year contract with HC Liberec for the 2008–09 season. He took up the position of captain upon his arrival in Liberec. At the end of the season, however, he left the club. Modrý left Liberec on 1 May 2009 and signed with HC Plzeň.

== Coaching career ==
After his playing career concluded, Modrý got involved in coaching. From 2016 to 2021, he worked as a youth coach in the Los Angeles Kings organization, including three seasons as an assistant coach with the AHL's Ontario Reign. Modrý then returned to his native Czech Republic to coach there with HC Motor České Budějovice and HC Kometa Brno. In June 2024, he left his head coaching position in Brno, citing family reasons, and accepted an assistant coaching position with the AHL's Springfield Thunderbirds.

== Personal life ==
Modrý is the brother-in-law of John Slaney as their wives are sisters.

== Career statistics ==
=== Regular season and playoffs ===
			Regular season					Playoffs
Season	Team	League	GP	G	A	Pts	PIM	GP	G	A	Pts	PIM
1987–88	TJ Motor České Budějovice	CSSR	3	0	0	0	0	—	—	—	—	—
1988–89	TJ Motor České Budějovice	CSSR	16	0	0	0	8	12	0	1	1	—
1989–90	TJ Motor České Budějovice	CSSR	41	2	2	4	—	—	—	—	—	—
1990–91	ASVŠ Dukla Trenčín	CSSR	33	1	9	10	6	4	0	3	3	0
1991–92	TJ Motor České Budějovice	CZE II	14	4	10	14	—	—	—	—	—	—
1991–92	ASVŠ Dukla Trenčín	CSSR	18	0	4	4	6	—	—	—	—	—
1992–93	Utica Devils	AHL	80	7	35	42	62	5	0	2	2	2
1993–94	New Jersey Devils	NHL	41	2	15	17	18	—	—	—	—	—
1993–94	Albany River Rats	AHL	19	1	5	6	25	—	—	—	—	—
1994–95	HC České Budějovice	ELH	19	1	3	4	30	—	—	—	—	—
1994–95	New Jersey Devils	NHL	11	0	0	0	0	—	—	—	—	—
1994–95	Albany River Rats	AHL	18	5	6	11	14	14	3	3	6	4
1995–96	Ottawa Senators	NHL	64	4	14	18	38	—	—	—	—	—
1995–96	Los Angeles Kings	NHL	9	0	3	3	6	—	—	—	—	—
1996–97	Los Angeles Kings	NHL	30	3	3	6	25	—	—	—	—	—
1996–97	Phoenix Roadrunners	IHL	23	3	12	15	17	—	—	—	—	—
1996–97	Utah Grizzlies	IHL	11	1	4	5	20	7	0	1	1	6
1997–98	Utah Grizzlies	IHL	74	12	21	33	72	4	0	2	2	6
1998–99	Los Angeles Kings	NHL	5	0	1	1	0	—	—	—	—	—
1998–99	Long Beach Ice Dogs	IHL	64	6	29	35	44	8	4	2	6	4
1999–2000	Long Beach Ice Dogs	IHL	11	2	4	6	8	—	—	—	—	—
1999–2000	Los Angeles Kings	NHL	26	5	4	9	18	2	0	0	0	2
2000–01	Los Angeles Kings	NHL	63	4	15	19	48	10	1	0	1	4
2001–02	Los Angeles Kings	NHL	80	4	38	42	65	7	0	2	2	0
2002–03	Los Angeles Kings	NHL	82	13	25	38	68	—	—	—	—	—
2003–04	Los Angeles Kings	NHL	79	5	27	32	44	—	—	—	—	—
2004–05	Bílí Tygři Liberec	ELH	19	3	7	10	24	12	0	4	4	22
2005–06	Atlanta Thrashers	NHL	79	7	31	38	76	—	—	—	—	—
2006–07	Dallas Stars	NHL	57	1	9	10	32	—	—	—	—	—
2006–07	Los Angeles Kings	NHL	19	0	8	8	22	—	—	—	—	—
2007–08	Los Angeles Kings	NHL	61	1	5	6	42	—	—	—	—	—
2007–08	Philadelphia Flyers	NHL	19	0	3	3	8	9	0	3	3	0
2008–09	Bílí Tygři Liberec	ELH	52	3	14	17	48	3	0	0	0	6
2009–10	HC Plzeň 1929	ELH	52	9	18	27	91	6	0	3	3	8
2010–11	HC Plzeň 1929	ELH	52	8	12	20	54	4	0	1	1	4
2011–12	HC Plzeň 1929	ELH	14	1	0	1	37	10	0	2	2	6
CSSR totals			111	3	15	18	20	16	0	4	4	—
NHL totals			725	49	201	250	510	28	1	5	6	6
ELH totals			208	25	54	79	284	35	0	10	10	46

=== International ===
Year	Team	Event	GP	G	A	Pts	PIM
1989	Czechoslovakia	EJC
1991	Czechoslovakia	WJC	6	0	1	1	2
2003	Czech Republic	WC	9	0	3	3	4
