= Alexander Burmistrov =

Russian ice hockey player (born 1991)

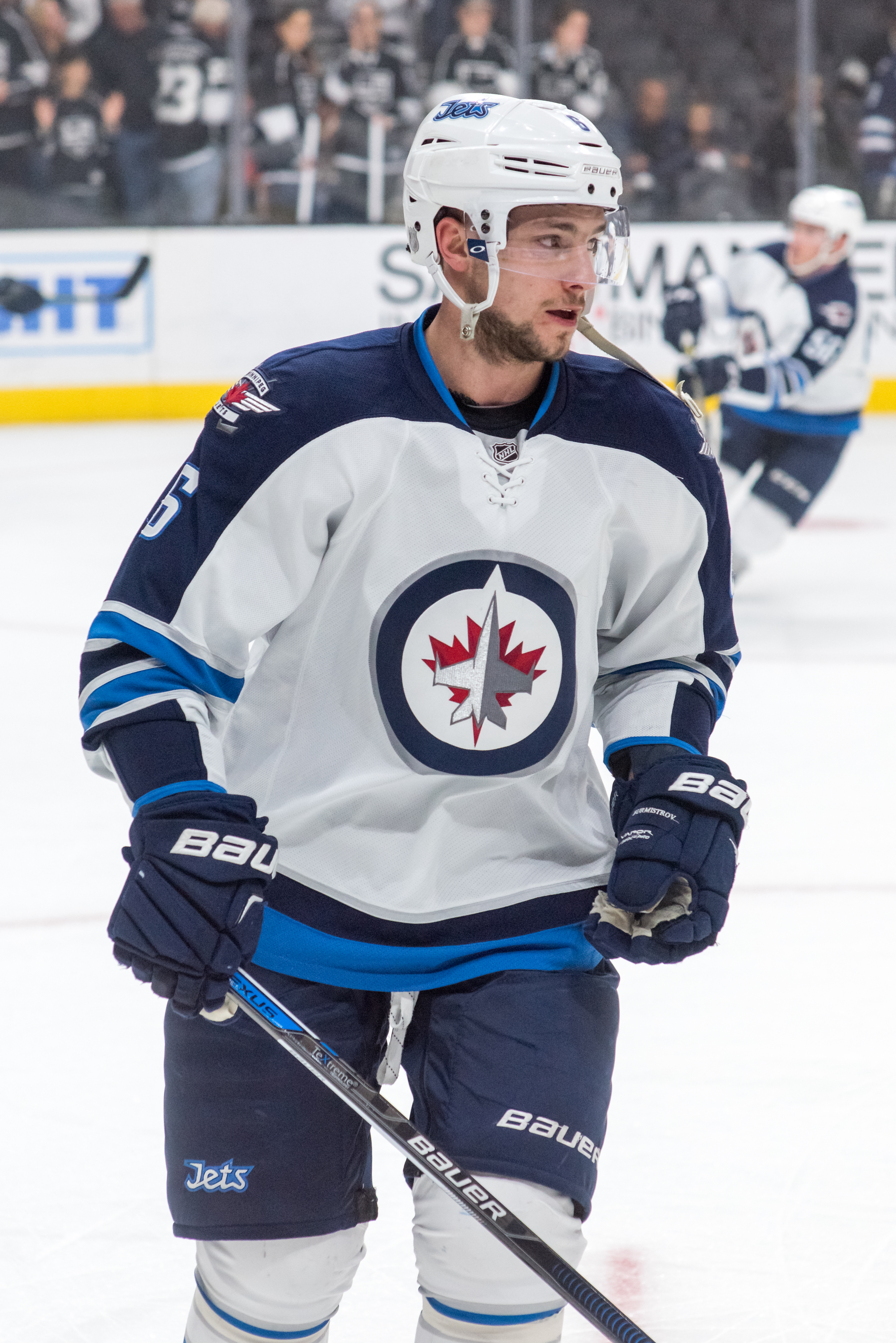
- Burmistrov with the Winnipeg Jets in 2016
- Born: 21 October 1991 (age 34) Kazan, Russian SFSR, Soviet Union
- Height: 6 ft 1 in (185 cm)
- Weight: 180 lb (82 kg; 12 st 12 lb)
- Position: Centre
- Shoots: Left
- ECHL team Former teams: Cincinnati Cyclones; Ak Bars Kazan; Atlanta Thrashers; Winnipeg Jets; Arizona Coyotes; Vancouver Canucks; Salavat Yulaev Ufa; Metallurg Magnitogorsk; Spartak Moscow; Dynamo Moscow; Shanghai Dragons
- National team: Russia
- NHL draft: 8th overall, 2010; Atlanta Thrashers
- Playing career: 2008–present

Alexander Olegovich Burmistrov (Russian: Александр Олегович Бурмистров, [ɐlʲɪˈksandr bʊrˈmʲistrəf]; born 21 October 1991) is a Russian professional ice hockey centre who currently plays for the Cincinnati Cyclones of the ECHL. He previously played in the National Hockey League (NHL) for the Atlanta Thrashers/Winnipeg Jets franchise as well as the Arizona Coyotes, before leaving the NHL after a short stint with the Vancouver Canucks. Burmistrov won the Gagarin Cup with Ak Bars Kazan in 2018.

== Playing career ==
=== Junior ===
Burmistrov joined the Ontario Hockey League (OHL)'s Barrie Colts after being selected 12th overall in the 2009 CHL Import Draft. He made his debut in North America on 17 September 2009 against the Owen Sound Attack, recording his first career OHL goal in his debut.

=== Professional ===
==== Atlanta Thrashers/Winnipeg Jets ====
Having been drafted into the NHL by the Atlanta Thrashers eighth overall at the 2010 NHL entry draft, on 8 October 2010, Burmistrov made his NHL debut with Atlanta in a game against the Washington Capitals. On 29 October, in a game against the Buffalo Sabres, he scored his first career NHL goal. He then engaged in his first career NHL fight on 11 December against John Tavares of the New York Islanders.

During the 2011–12 season, Burmistrov would score 13 goals with 15 assists for the newly relocated Winnipeg Jets. At the onset of the 2012–13 NHL lockout, Burmistrov was assigned to Winnipeg's American Hockey League (AHL) affiliate, the St. John's IceCaps, where he would record 2 goals and 9 assists (11 points) in 22 games before being recalled to Winnipeg for the start of the shortened 2012–13 season.

==== Ak Bars Kazan ====
At season's end, Burmistrov became a restricted free agent and subsequently signed a two-year contract with Ak Bars Kazan of the Kontinental Hockey League (KHL). He explained in interviews that his departure from the NHL was motivated by dissatisfaction with his role under Jets head coach Claude Noël as well as bitterness over being assigned to the AHL rather than being allowed to pursue a more lucrative offer in Russia during the NHL lockout.

==== Return to Winnipeg ====
On 1 July 2015, the opening day of the NHL free agency period, Burmistrov signed a two-year contract to return to Winnipeg.

==== Arizona Coyotes ====
In a disappointing start to the 2016–17 season in which he scored only 2 points in 23 games with Winnipeg, Burmistrov was placed on waivers on 1 January 2017 and was subsequently claimed by the Arizona Coyotes. He recorded 5 goals and 14 points in 26 games with the Coyotes.

==== Vancouver Canucks and NHL retirement ====
On 1 July 2017, as a free agent, Burmistrov signed a one-year, $900,000 contract with the Vancouver Canucks. He was used in a limited role and received minimal playing time with the Canucks. On 24 December 2017, his agent, Dan Milstein, released a statement on Twitter that stated Burmistrov had "retired from the NHL" and that an announcement on his future was forthcoming. The wording of Milstein's tweet has fueled speculation that Burmistrov would return to the KHL once his retirement paperwork with the NHL was completed.

==== Return to KHL ====
Three days after his retirement tweet was sent out, Burmistrov returned to the KHL, signing with former club Ak Bars Kazan. In joining Ak Bars through the push for the playoffs in the 2017–18 season, Burmistrov added depth to the offence, contributing with 6 points in 10 games. He made 17 playoff appearances and scored 3 points to help Ak Bars claim the Gagarin Cup.

On 6 June 2018, Burmistrov signed a two-year contract extension with Ak Bars. During the 2018–19 season, Burmistrov struggled to gain his offensive touch, registering just 5 points in 27 games for the defending champions before he was traded to Salavat Yulaev Ufa in exchange for three prospects on 1 December 2018.

Burmistrov remained with Salavat through the 2019–20 season, notching 6 goals and 18 points in 58 games in a checking-line role. He added a goal and assist in Salavat's opening round victory over Avangard Omsk before the remainder of playoffs were cancelled due to the COVID-19 pandemic.

As a free agent, Burmistrov returned home to Ak Bars Kazan, agreeing to a one-year contract for his fourth stint with the club on 5 June 2020.

After not playing for the first several months of the 2024–25 season, Burmistrov finally signed as a free agent to play the remainder of the season with HC Dynamo Moscow on 26 December. Burmistrov was limited to just 8 regular season appearances with Dynamo, going scoreless.

As a free agent, Burmistrov was signed by the Shanghai Dragons to a one-year, two-way contract on 17 August 2025.

Burmistrov signed with the ECHL's Cincinnati Cyclones on August 21, 2026.

== International play ==
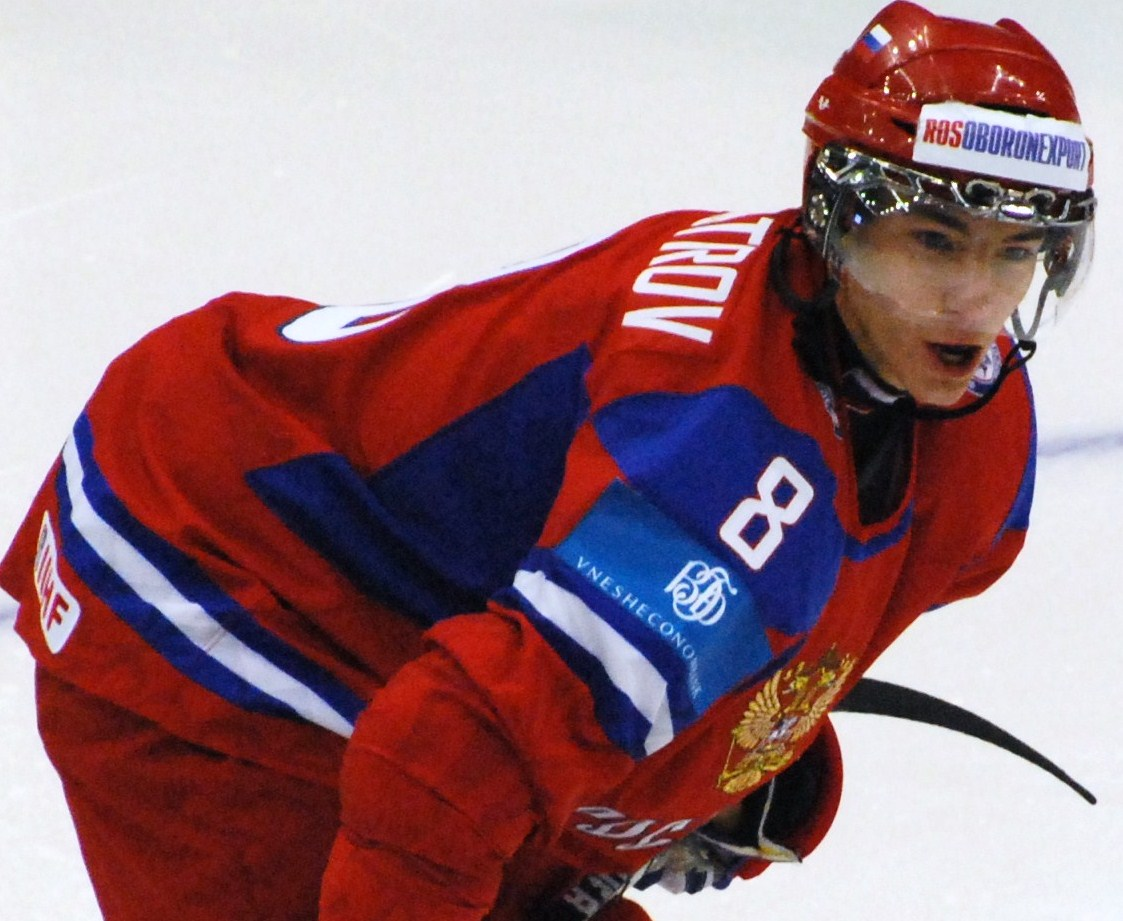
- Burmistrov with Team Russia in 2010

Medal record

Men's ice hockey

Representing Russia

World Championships
Gold medal – first place	2014 Minsk	
Bronze medal – third place	2016 Russia	

World U18 Championships
Silver medal – second place	2009 United States	

Burmistrov represented Russia at the 2010 World Junior Championships held in Saskatchewan. He was named to the Russian senior team for competition at the 2014 IIHF World Championship.

== Career statistics ==
=== Regular season and playoffs ===
			Regular season					Playoffs
Season	Team	League	GP	G	A	Pts	PIM	GP	G	A	Pts	PIM
2006–07	Ak Bars–2 Kazan	RUS.3	27	2	4	6	16	—	—	—	—	—
2007–08	Ak Bars–2 Kazan	RUS.3	—	14	21	35	—	—	—	—	—	—
2008–09	Ak Bars–2 Kazan	RUS.3	41	28	30	58	68	—	—	—	—	—
2008–09	Ak Bars Kazan	KHL	1	0	0	0	0	—	—	—	—	—
2009–10	Barrie Colts	OHL	62	22	43	65	49	17	8	8	16	22
2010–11	Atlanta Thrashers	NHL	74	6	14	20	27	—	—	—	—	—
2011–12	Winnipeg Jets	NHL	76	13	15	28	42	—	—	—	—	—
2012–13	St. John's IceCaps	AHL	22	2	9	11	24	—	—	—	—	—
2012–13	Winnipeg Jets	NHL	44	4	6	10	14	—	—	—	—	—
2013–14	Ak Bars Kazan	KHL	54	10	28	38	32	6	0	2	2	9
2014–15	Ak Bars Kazan	KHL	53	10	16	26	40	17	1	3	4	8
2015–16	Winnipeg Jets	NHL	81	7	14	21	32	—	—	—	—	—
2016–17	Winnipeg Jets	NHL	23	0	2	2	6	—	—	—	—	—
2016–17	Arizona Coyotes	NHL	26	5	9	14	6	—	—	—	—	—
2017–18	Vancouver Canucks	NHL	24	2	4	6	12	—	—	—	—	—
2017–18	Ak Bars Kazan	KHL	10	2	4	6	12	17	1	2	3	18
2018–19	Ak Bars Kazan	KHL	27	3	2	5	12	—	—	—	—	—
2018–19	Salavat Yulaev Ufa	KHL	28	2	7	9	16	15	1	3	4	29
2019–20	Salavat Yulaev Ufa	KHL	58	6	12	18	28	6	1	1	2	2
2020–21	Ak Bars Kazan	KHL	44	6	11	17	37	12	0	2	2	8
2021–22	Ak Bars Kazan	KHL	28	3	7	10	16	4	0	0	0	0
2022–23	Ak Bars Kazan	KHL	26	1	2	3	8	—	—	—	—	—
2022–23	Metallurg Magnitogorsk	KHL	16	1	1	2	6	9	0	0	0	8
2023–24	Spartak Moscow	KHL	50	2	16	18	12	3	0	1	1	0
2024–25	Dynamo Moscow	KHL	8	0	0	0	0	—	—	—	—	—
2025–26	Shanghai Dragons	KHL	20	0	2	2	0	—	—	—	—	—
KHL totals			423	46	108	154	219	89	4	14	18	82
NHL totals			348	37	64	101	139	—	—	—	—	—

=== International ===
Year	Team	Event	Result	GP	G	A	Pts	PIM
2008	Russia	U17	5th	5	2	1	3	12
2008	Russia	IH18	2nd place, silver medalist(s)	4	1	4	5	4
2009	Russia	WJC18	2nd place, silver medalist(s)	7	4	7	11	6
2010	Russia	WJC	6th	6	3	1	4	6
2014	Russia	WC	1st place, gold medalist(s)	10	1	0	1	4
2016	Russia	WC	3rd place, bronze medalist(s)	9	0	1	1	4
Junior totals				22	10	13	23	28
Senior totals				19	1	1	2	8

== Awards and honours ==
Award	Year
KHL
Gagarin Cup (Ak Bars Kazan)	2018

Awards and achievements
Preceded by Evander Kane	Atlanta Thrashers first-round draft pick 2010	Succeeded by Mark Scheifele
