= Patrik Štefan =

Czech ice hockey player (born 1980)

- Born: 16 September 1980 (age 45) Příbram, Czechoslovakia
- Height: 6 ft 2 in (188 cm)
- Weight: 210 lb (95 kg; 15 st 0 lb)
- Position: Centre
- Shot: Left
- Played for: Sparta Praha; Long Beach Ice Dogs; Atlanta Thrashers; Chicago Wolves; Ilves; Dallas Stars; SC Bern
- National team: Czech Republic
- NHL draft: 1st overall, 1999; Atlanta Thrashers
- Playing career: 1996–2007

Patrik Štefan (born 16 September 1980) is a Czech former professional ice hockey player who was drafted as the first overall pick by the Atlanta Thrashers in the 1999 NHL entry draft. Because his career was plagued by injuries and inconsistency, many hockey writers consider him a draft bust.

== Playing career ==
Prior to being drafted by the Thrashers, Štefan played for Sparta Praha in the Czech Republic, and the Long Beach Ice Dogs of the IHL.

Štefan played six seasons for the Atlanta Thrashers scoring 177 points. During the 2004–05 NHL lockout, Štefan played for Ilves Tampere in the SM-liiga. In 37 games, Štefan collected a total of 41 points including 28 assists. In the playoffs, Štefan had six assists and a goal in seven games.

On 24 June 2006, Štefan was traded to the Dallas Stars along with Jaroslav Modrý for Niko Kapanen and a seventh-round draft pick in 2006.

After Štefan's contract expired in 2007, the Stars chose not to re-sign him. Štefan signed with SC Bern of the Nationalliga A, but he only played three games for them before retiring in October 2007, largely due to a serious hip injury, the latest of several chronic injuries that plagued his career.

=== Empty net blunder ===
Štefan gained notoriety on 4 January 2007 for a blunder during a game against the Edmonton Oilers. With seconds left in the game, and Dallas already ahead by a goal, Štefan gained possession of the puck and found himself on a breakaway towards an empty net. Štefan continued skating towards the crease rather than immediately shooting, then attempted a casual backhand into the net from close quarters. The puck hit bad ice and bounced up and over his stick, causing him to miss the goal, trip, and fall against the ice. To compound the error, he then cleared the puck in the direction of the Oilers. This allowed his compatriot Aleš Hemský to score with two seconds remaining to tie the game 5–5; however, Dallas ultimately won in a shootout.

== Personal life ==
He is currently a player agent in the Detroit area, and a youth coach with 15U Little Caesars Hockey.

Štefan's son James is a prospect for the Edmonton Oilers.

== Career statistics ==
=== Regular season and playoffs ===
			Regular season					Playoffs
Season	Team	League	GP	G	A	Pts	PIM	GP	G	A	Pts	PIM
1996–97	HC Sparta Praha	ELH	5	0	1	1	2	7	1	0	1	0
1997–98	HC Sparta Praha	ELH	27	2	6	8	16	—	—	—	—	—
1997–98	Long Beach Ice Dogs	IHL	25	5	10	15	10	10	1	1	2	2
1998–99	Long Beach Ice Dogs	IHL	33	11	24	35	26	—	—	—	—	—
1999–2000	Atlanta Thrashers	NHL	72	5	20	25	30	—	—	—	—	—
2000–01	Atlanta Thrashers	NHL	66	10	21	31	22	—	—	—	—	—
2001–02	Chicago Wolves	AHL	5	3	0	3	0	—	—	—	—	—
2001–02	Atlanta Thrashers	NHL	59	7	16	23	22	—	—	—	—	—
2002–03	Atlanta Thrashers	NHL	71	13	21	34	12	—	—	—	—	—
2003–04	Atlanta Thrashers	NHL	82	14	26	40	26	—	—	—	—	—
2004–05	Ilves	SM-l	37	13	28	41	47	7	1	6	7	4
2005–06	Atlanta Thrashers	NHL	64	10	14	24	36	—	—	—	—	—
2006–07	Dallas Stars	NHL	41	5	6	11	10	—	—	—	—	—
2007–08	SC Bern	NLA	3	1	0	1	0	—	—	—	—	—
NHL totals			455	64	124	188	158	—	—	—	—	—

=== International ===
Year	Team	Event	GP	G	A	Pts	PIM
1996	Czech Republic	EJC	5	1	2	3	4
1997	Czech Republic	EJC	6	3	1	4	6
1998	Czech Republic	WJC	7	1	1	2	4
2006	Czech Republic	WC	9	1	0	1	4
Junior totals			18	5	4	9	14
Senior totals			9	1	0	1	4

== Honours and achievements ==
- Silver medal at 2006 IIHF World Championship

== See also ==
- List of NHL first overall draft choices

Preceded by Vincent Lecavalier	NHL first overall draft pick 1999	Succeeded by Rick DiPietro
Preceded by None	Atlanta Thrashers first round draft pick 1999	Succeeded by Dany Heatley
