= List of Atlanta Thrashers draft picks =

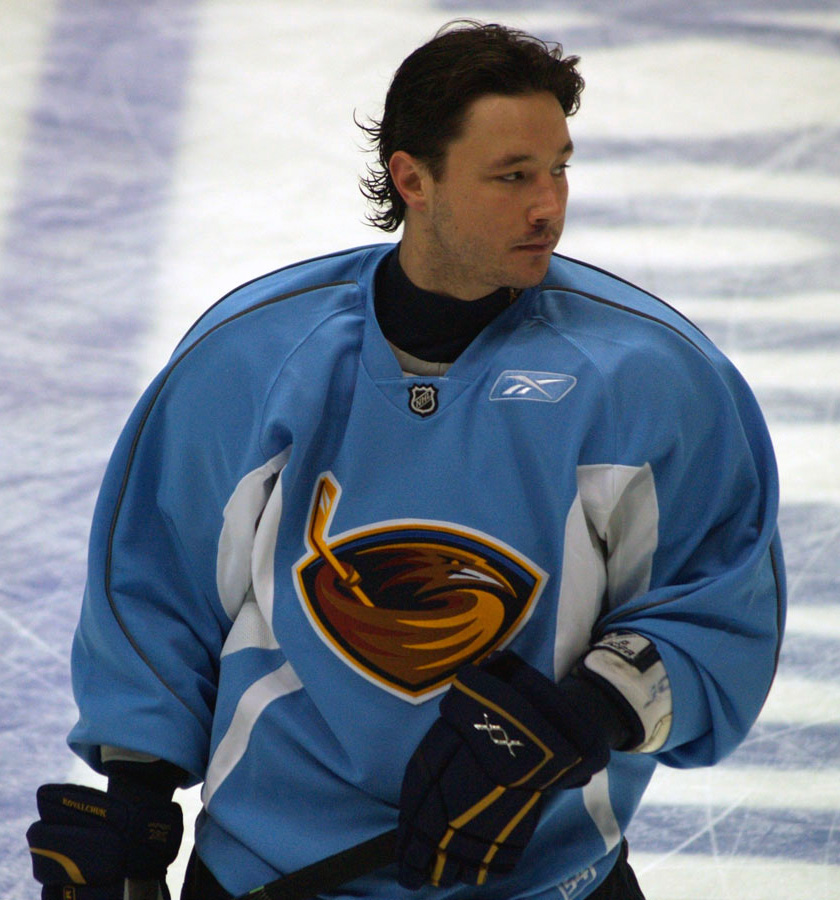
The Thrashers selected Ilya Kovalchuk first overall in 2001.

The Atlanta Thrashers were a professional ice hockey franchise based in Atlanta. They played in the Southeast Division of the Eastern Conference in the National Hockey League (NHL). The franchise was founded in 1999 and existed for 12 years before relocating to Winnipeg, Manitoba to become the Jets in 2011. During their existence the Thrashers drafted 107 players with the 2010 draft being their twelfth and final.

The NHL entry draft is held each June, allowing teams to select players who have turned 18 years old by September 15 in the year the draft is held. The draft order is determined by the previous season's order of finish, with non-playoff teams drafting first, followed by the teams that made the playoffs, with the specific order determined by the number of points earned by each team. The NHL holds a weighted lottery for the 14 non-playoff teams, allowing the winner to move up a maximum of four positions in the entry draft. The team with the fewest points has the best chance of winning the lottery, with each successive team given a lower chance of moving up in the draft.

Atlanta's first draft pick was Patrik Stefan, taken first overall, in the 1999 NHL entry draft. He played seven seasons in the NHL, but has been called one of the biggest draft busts in league history. Two years after drafting Stefan, Atlanta again had the first overall pick and selected Ilya Kovalchuk. He became the Thrashers all-time leader in 10 statistical categories. He is the leader in goals, assists, points, shots on goal, overtime goals, power play goals, game-winning goals, and games played.

As of the 2026–27 NHL season, Zach Bogosian and Ben Chiarot are the only active former Thrashers draft picks, with Bogosian the last active player to have played a game for the Thrashers themselves.

== Key ==
^{†} Played at least one game with the Thrashers. (Note: Only counts games with the franchise while in Atlanta; games played with the Winnipeg Jets do not count.)
* Spent entire NHL career with the Thrashers.

Statistics
Pos	Position	GP	Games played
G	Goals	A	Assists
Pts	Points	PIM	Penalties in minutes
GAA	Goals against average	W	Wins
L	Losses	T	Ties
OT	Overtime or shootout losses	–	Does not apply

Positions
G	Goaltender
D	Defenseman
LW	Left wing
C	Center
RW	Right wing
F	Forward

== Draft picks ==
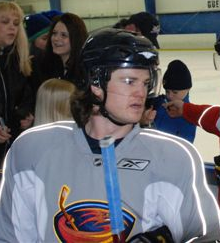
The Thrashers selected Garnet Exelby 217th overall in 1999.

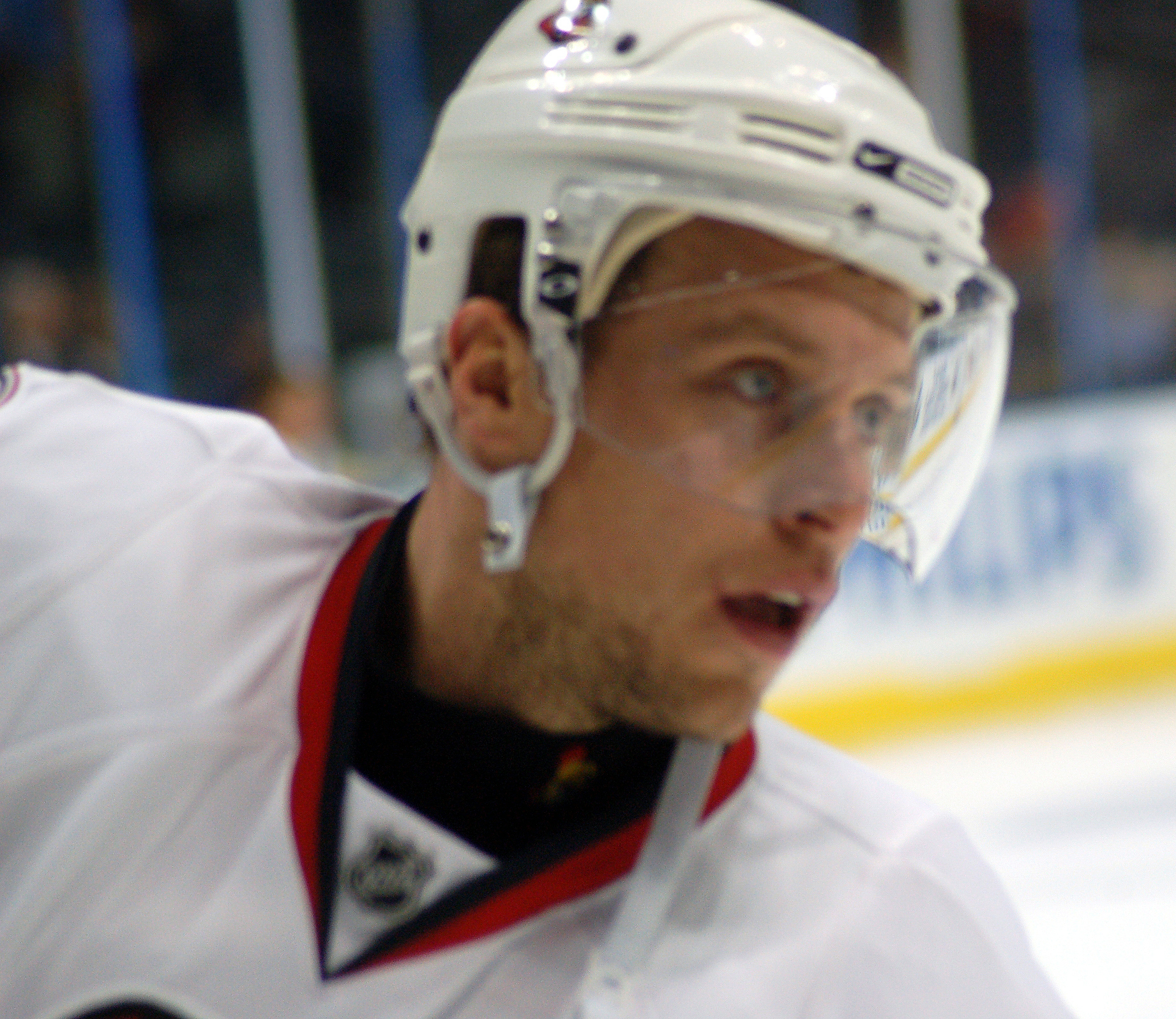
Dany Heatley was drafted with the second overall pick in 2000.

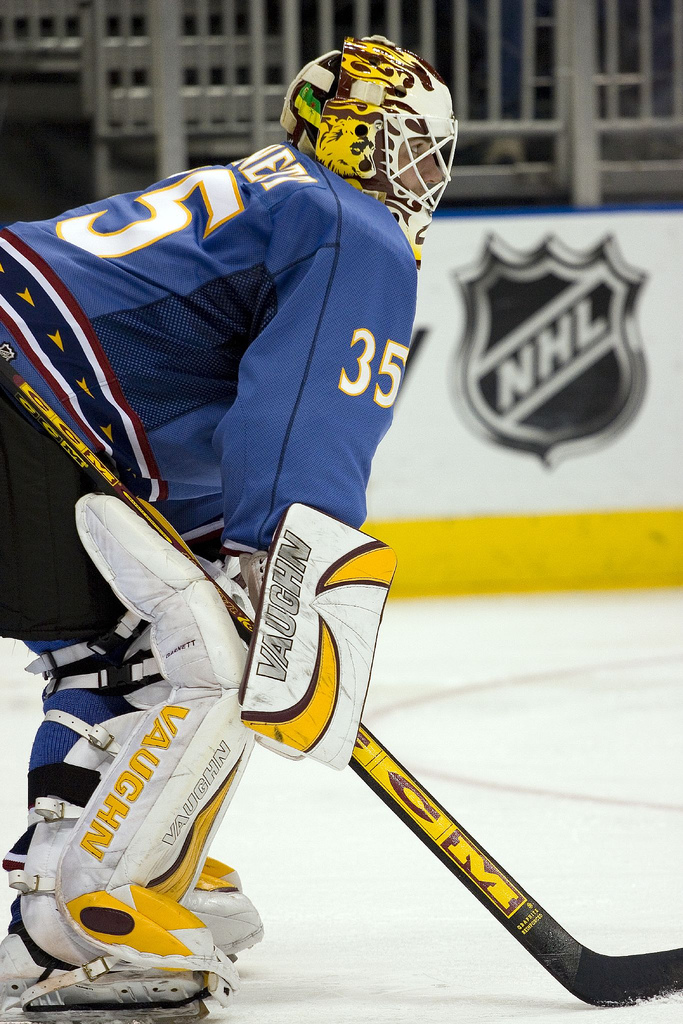
The Thrashers selected Michael Garnett 80th overall in 2001.

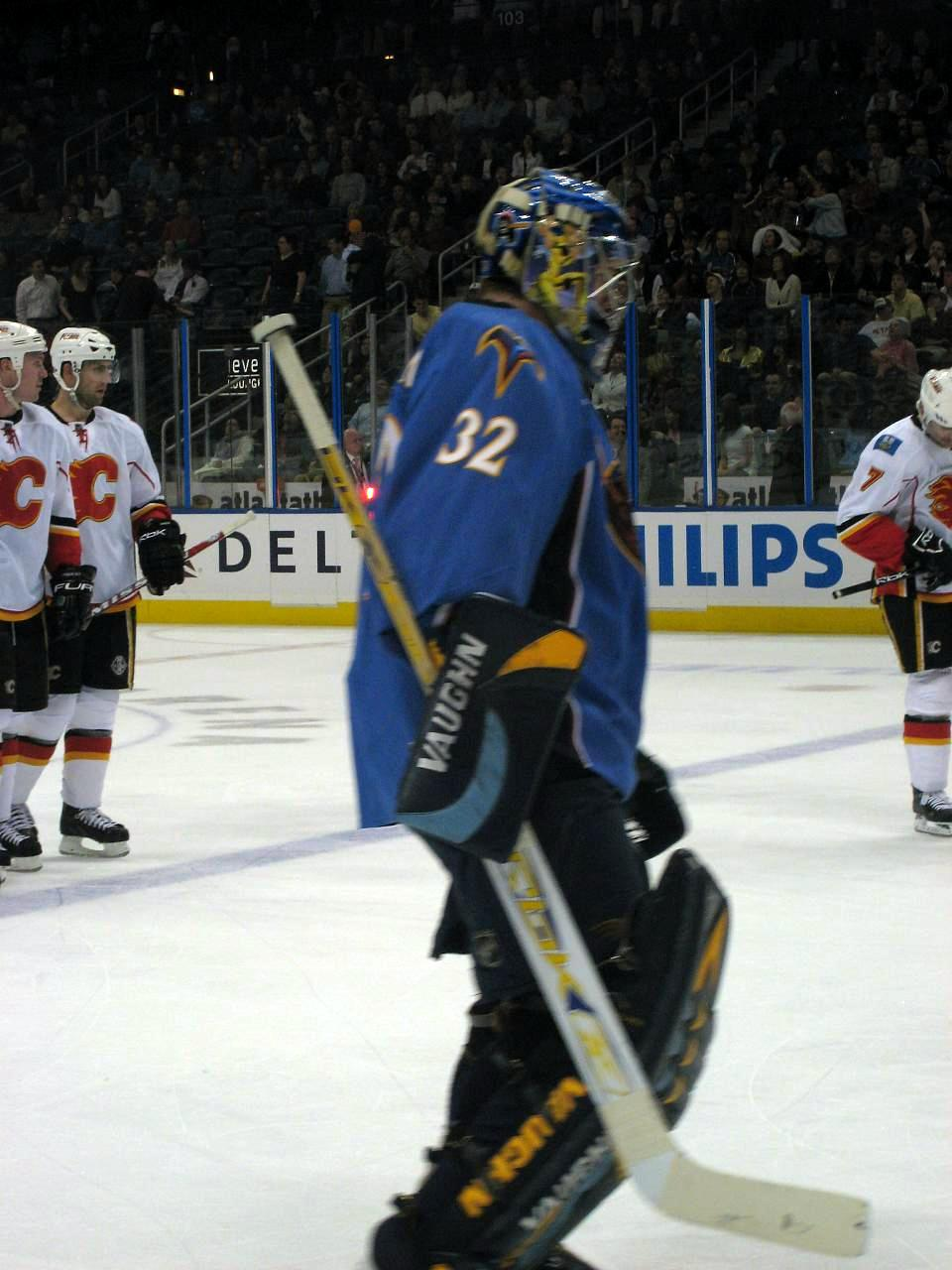
The Thrashers selected Kari Lehtonen second overall in 2002.

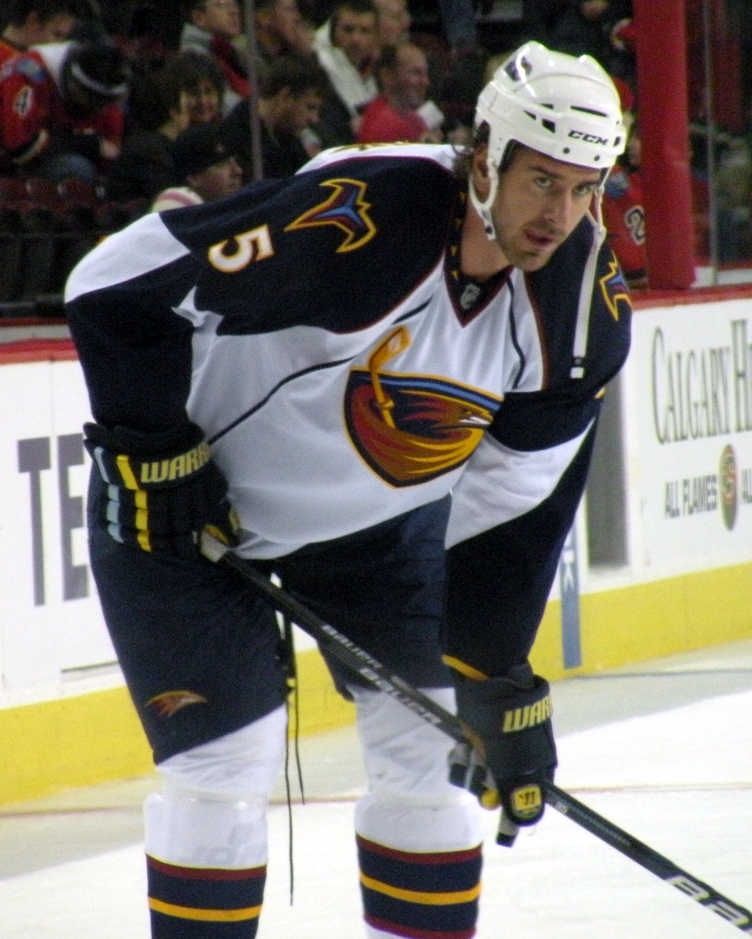
The Thrashers selected Boris Valabik 10th overall in 2004.

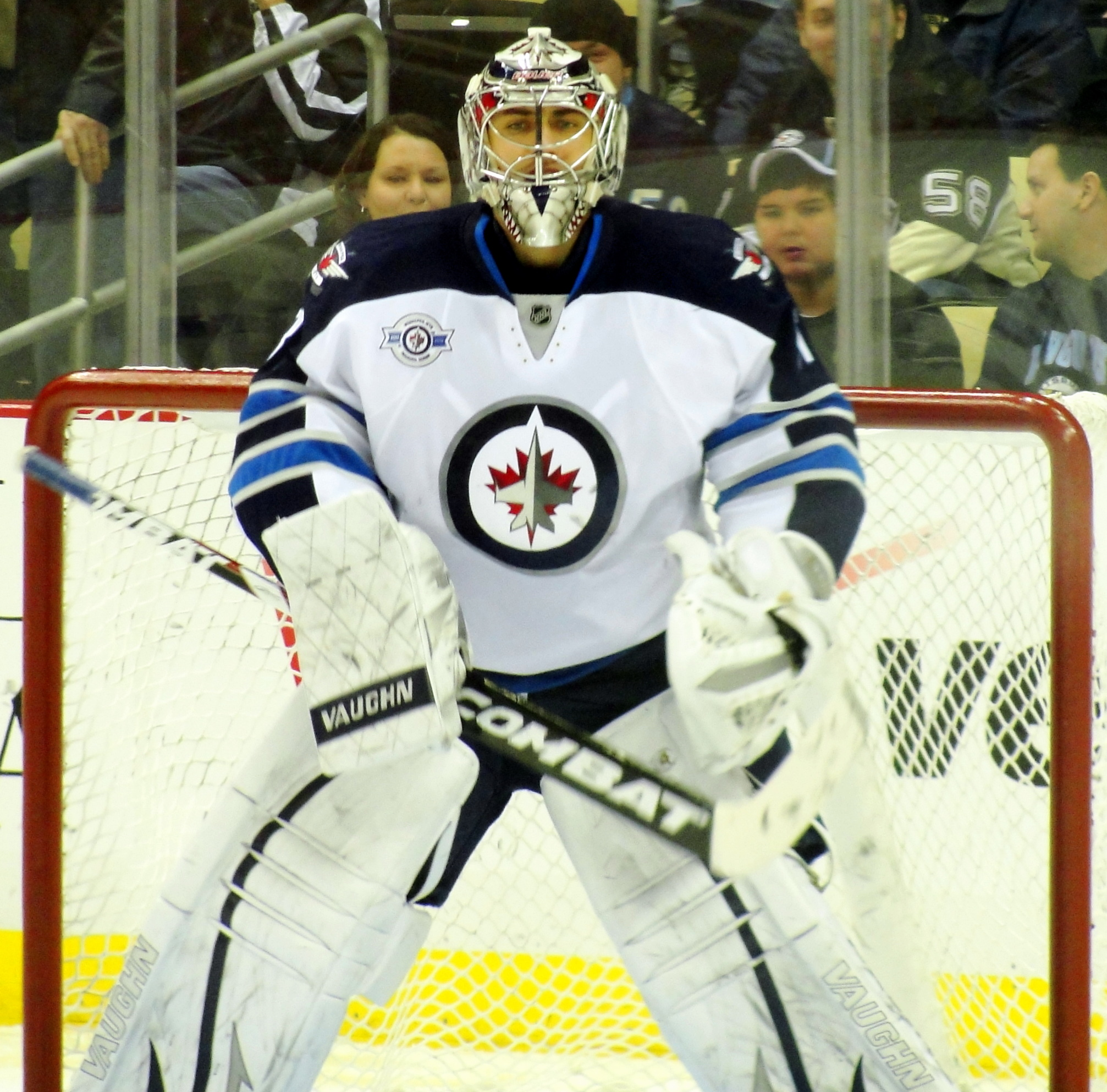
Ondrej Pavelec, shown here with the Winnipeg Jets, was taken 41st overall, in 2005.

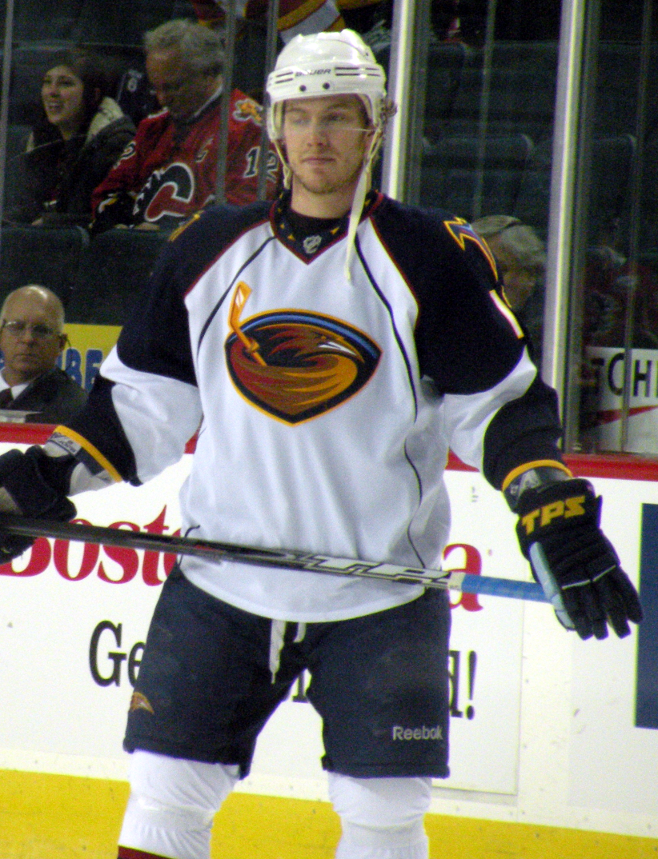
The Thrashers selected Bryan Little 12th overall in 2006.

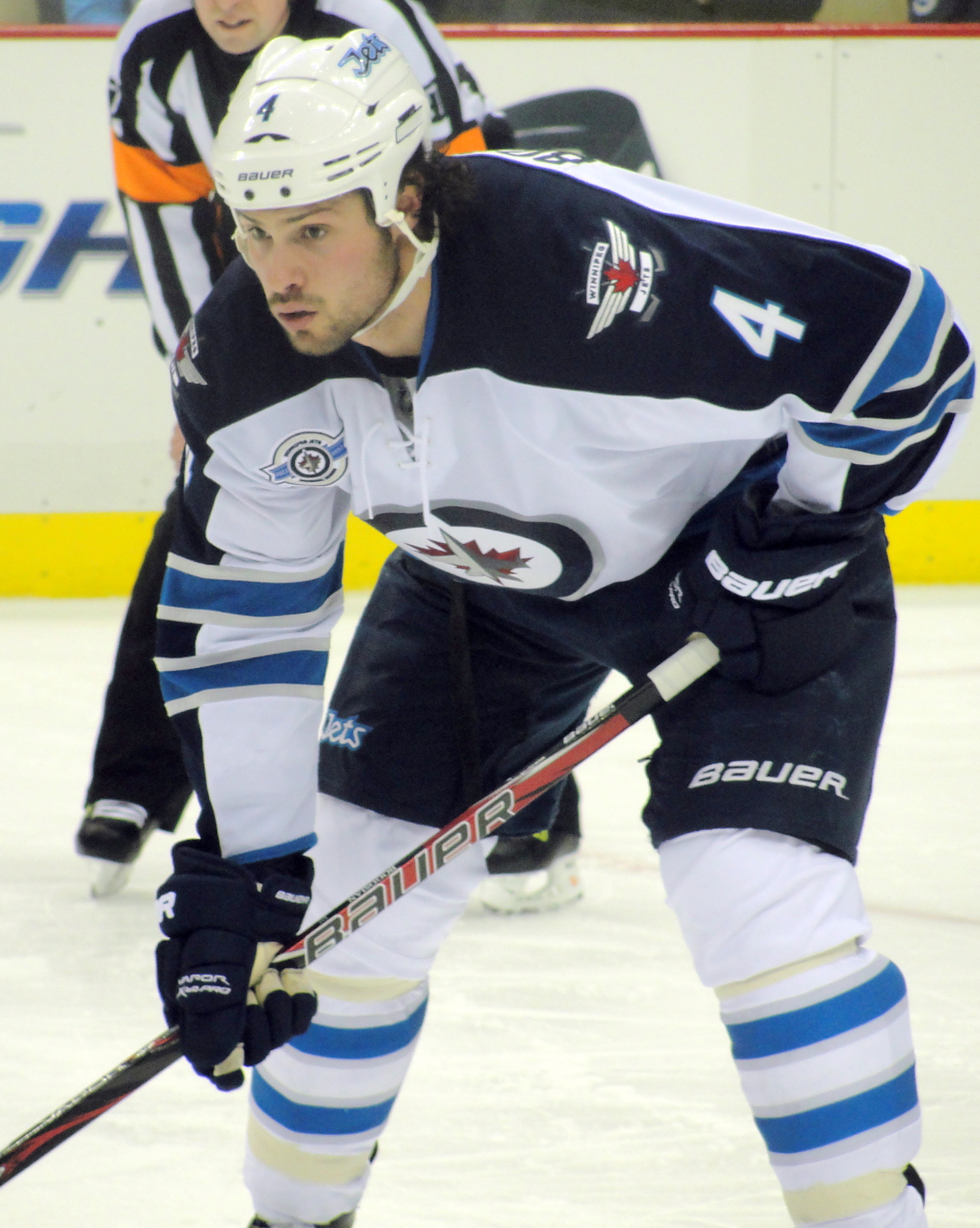
Zach Bogosian, shown here with the Winnipeg Jets, was taken third overall, in 2008.

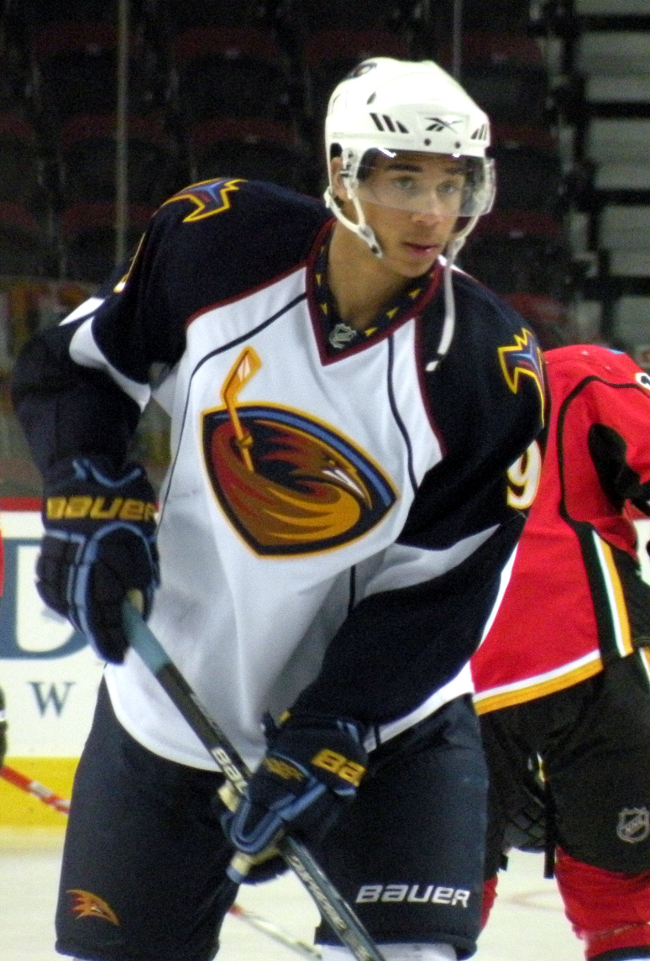
The Thrashers selected Evander Kane with the fourth overall pick in 2009. As of 2026, he is the only Thrashers draft pick to reach 1,000 games played.

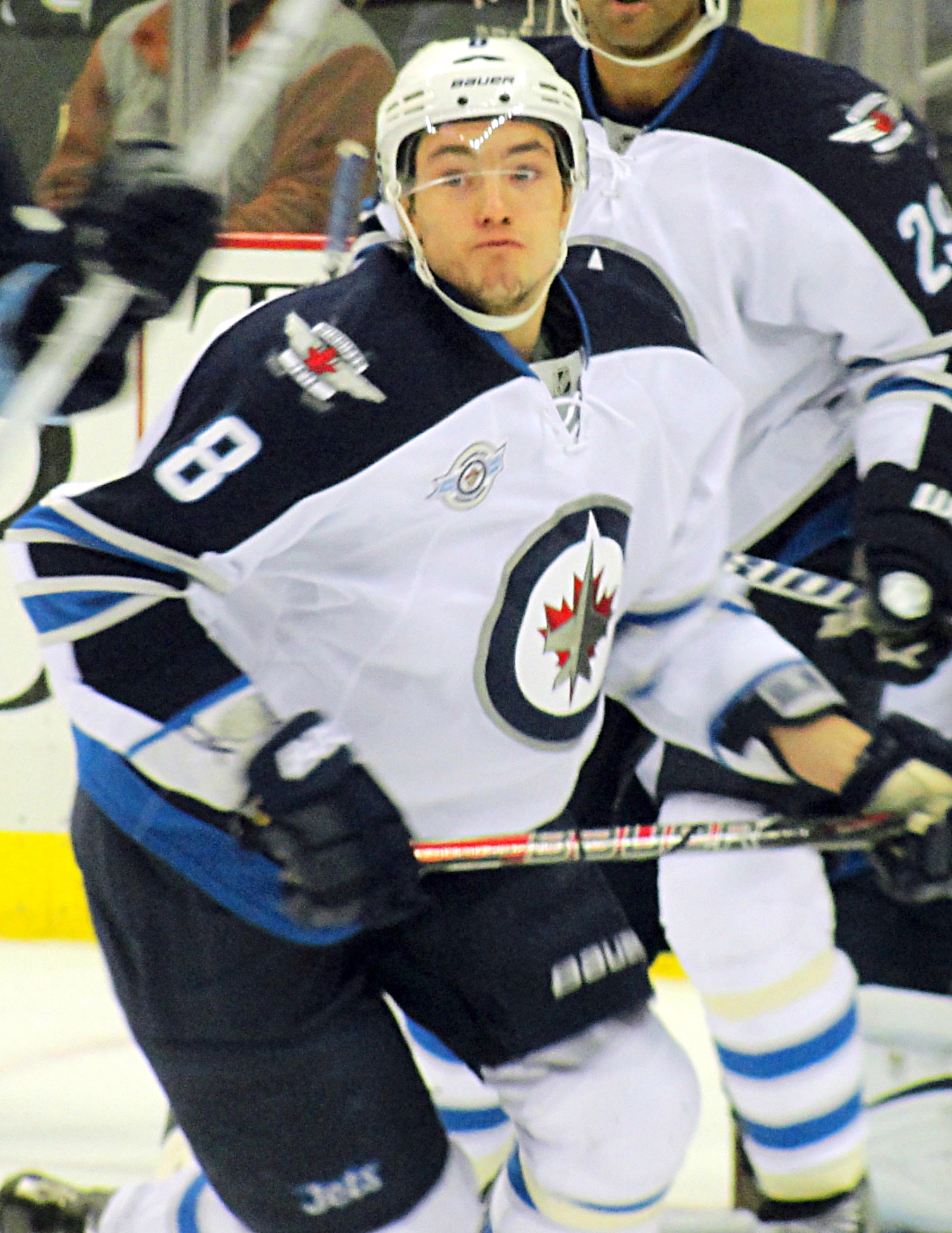
Alexander Burmistrov was the Thrashers' final first round pick, selected eighth overall in 2010.

Statistics are complete as of the 2025–26 NHL season and show each player's career regular season totals in the NHL. Wins, losses, ties, overtime losses and goals against average apply to goaltenders and are used only for players at that position. A player listed with a dash under the games played column has not played in the NHL.

Year	Round	Pick	Player	Nationality	Pos	GP	G	A	Pts	PIM	W	L	T	OT	GAA
1999	1	1	Patrik Stefan^{†}	Czech Republic	C	455	64	124	188	158	—	—	—	—	—
1999	2	30	Luke Sellars*	Canada	D	1	0	0	0	2	—	—	—	—	—
1999	3	68	Zdenek Blatny^{†}	Czech Republic	LW	25	3	0	3	8	—	—	—	—	—
1999	4	98	David Kaczowka	Canada	LW	—	—	—	—	—	—	—	—	—	—
1999	4	99	Rob Zepp	Canada	G	10	0	0	0	0	5	2	—	0	2.89
1999	5	128	Derek MacKenzie^{†}	Canada	C	611	51	74	125	337	—	—	—	—	—
1999	6	159	Yuri Dobryshkin	Russia	RW	—	—	—	—	—	—	—	—	—	—
1999	7	188	Stephen Baby	United States	RW	—	—	—	—	—	—	—	—	—	—
1999	8	217	Garnet Exelby^{†}	Canada	D	408	7	43	50	584	—	—	—	—	—
1999	9	245	Tommi Santala^{†}	Finland	C	63	2	7	9	46	—	—	—	—	—
1999	9	246	Ray DiLauro	United States	D	—	—	—	—	—	—	—	—	—	—
2000	1	2	Dany Heatley^{†}	Canada	LW	869	372	419	791	620	—	—	—	—	—
2000	2	31	Ilya Nikulin	Russia	D	—	—	—	—	—	—	—	—	—	—
2000	2	42	Libor Ustrnul	Czech Republic	D	—	—	—	—	—	—	—	—	—	—
2000	4	107	Carl Mallette	Canada	C	—	—	—	—	—	—	—	—	—	—
2000	4	108	Blake Robson	Canada	LW	—	—	—	—	—	—	—	—	—	—
2000	5	147	Matthew McRae	Canada	F	—	—	—	—	—	—	—	—	—	—
2000	6	168	Zdenek Smid	Czech Republic	G	—	—	—	—	—	—	—	—	—	—
2000	6	178	Jeff Dwyer	United States	D	—	—	—	—	—	—	—	—	—	—
2000	6	108	Darcy Hordichuk^{†}	Canada	LW	542	20	21	41	1,140	—	—	—	—	—
2000	8	230	Samu Isosalo	Finland	C	—	—	—	—	—	—	—	—	—	—
2000	8	242	Evan Nielsen	United States	D	—	—	—	—	—	—	—	—	—	—
2000	8	244	Eric Bowen	United States	RW	—	—	—	—	—	—	—	—	—	—
2000	9	288	Mark McRae	Canada	D	—	—	—	—	—	—	—	—	—	—
2000	9	290	Simon Gamache^{†}	Canada	LW	48	6	7	13	18	—	—	—	—	—
2001	1	1	Ilya Kovalchuk^{†}	Russia	LW	926	443	433	876	544	—	—	—	—	—
2001	3	80	Michael Garnett*	Canada	G	24	0	2	2	0	10	7	—	4	3.45
2001	4	100	Brian Sipotz	United States	D	—	—	—	—	—	—	—	—	—	—
2001	4	112	Milan Gajic	Canada	C	—	—	—	—	—	—	—	—	—	—
2001	5	135	Colin Stuart^{†}	United States	LW	56	8	5	13	26	—	—	—	—	—
2001	6	189	Pasi Nurminen*	Finland	G	125	0	5	5	39	48	54	12	—	3.00
2001	7	199	Matt Suderman	Canada	D	—	—	—	—	—	—	—	—	—	—
2001	7	201	Colin FitzRandolph	United States	F	—	—	—	—	—	—	—	—	—	—
2001	9	262	Mario Cartelli	Czech Republic	D	—	—	—	—	—	—	—	—	—	—
2002	1	2	Kari Lehtonen^{†}	Finland	G	649	0	28	28	42	310	233	0	67	2.71
2002	1	30	Jim Slater^{†}	United States	C	584	67	71	138	407	—	—	—	—	—
2002	4	116	Patrick Dwyer	United States	RW	416	42	51	93	77	—	—	—	—	—
2002	4	124	Lane Manson	Canada	D	—	—	—	—	—	—	—	—	—	—
2002	5	144	Paul Flache	Canada	D	—	—	—	—	—	—	—	—	—	—
2002	6	167	Brad Schell	Canada	C	—	—	—	—	—	—	—	—	—	—
2002	7	198	Nathan Oystrick^{†}	Canada	D	65	5	10	15	61	—	—	—	—	—
2002	8	230	Colton Fretter	Canada	F	—	—	—	—	—	—	—	—	—	—
2002	8	236	Tyler Boldt	Canada	D	—	—	—	—	—	—	—	—	—	—
2002	8	257	Pauli Levokari	Finland	D	—	—	—	—	—	—	—	—	—	—
2003	1	8	Braydon Coburn^{†}	Canada	D	983	49	185	234	720	—	—	—	—	—
2003	4	110	Jim Sharrow	United States	D	—	—	—	—	—	—	—	—	—	—
2003	4	116	Guillaume Desbiens	Canada	RW	23	0	0	0	37	—	—	—	—	—
2003	4	136	Mike Vannelli	United States	D	—	—	—	—	—	—	—	—	—	—
2003	5	145	Brett Sterling^{†}	United States	LW	30	5	4	9	32	—	—	—	—	—
2003	6	175	Mike Hamilton	Canada	F	—	—	—	—	—	—	—	—	—	—
2003	7	203	Denis Loginov	Russia	C	—	—	—	—	—	—	—	—	—	—
2003	8	239	Tobias Enstrom^{†}	Sweden	D	719	54	254	308	422	—	—	—	—	—
2003	9	269	Rylan Kaip	Canada	C	—	—	—	—	—	—	—	—	—	—
2004	1	10	Boris Valabik*	Slovakia	D	80	0	7	7	210	—	—	—	—	—
2004	2	40	Grant Lewis*	United States	D	1	0	0	0	0	—	—	—	—	—
2004	3	76	Scott Lehman*	Canada	D	1	0	0	0	0	—	—	—	—	—
2004	4	106	Chad Painchaud	Canada	RW	—	—	—	—	—	—	—	—	—	—
2004	5	142	Juraj Gracik	Slovakia	RW	—	—	—	—	—	—	—	—	—	—
2004	6	186	Dan Turple	Canada	G	—	—	—	—	—	—	—	—	—	—
2004	7	204	Miikka Tuomainen	Finland	LW	—	—	—	—	—	—	—	—	—	—
2004	8	237	Mitch Carefoot	Canada	C	—	—	—	—	—	—	—	—	—	—
2004	9	270	Matt Siddall	Canada	RW	—	—	—	—	—	—	—	—	—	—
2005	1	16	Alex Bourret	Canada	RW	—	—	—	—	—	—	—	—	—	—
2005	2	41	Ondrej Pavelec^{†}	Czech Republic	G	398	0	6	6	12	156	167	—	48	2.88
2005	2	49	Chad Denny	Canada	D	—	—	—	—	—	—	—	—	—	—
2005	2	53	Andrew Kozek	Canada	F	—	—	—	—	—	—	—	—	—	—
2005	4	116	Jordan Smotherman*	United States	LW	4	1	1	2	0	—	—	—	—	—
2005	5	135	Tomas Pospisil	Czech Republic	LW	—	—	—	—	—	—	—	—	—	—
2005	6	186	Andrei Zubarev*	Russia	D	4	0	1	1	4	—	—	—	—	—
2005	7	207	Myles Stoesz	Canada	LW	—	—	—	—	—	—	—	—	—	—
2006	1	12	Bryan Little^{†}	Canada	C	843	217	304	521	293	—	—	—	—	—
2006	2	43	Riley Holzapfel	Canada	C	—	—	—	—	—	—	—	—	—	—
2006	3	80	Michael Forney	United States	LW	—	—	—	—	—	—	—	—	—	—
2006	5	135	Alex Kangas	United States	G	—	—	—	—	—	—	—	—	—	—
2006	6	165	Jonas Enlund	Finland	C	—	—	—	—	—	—	—	—	—	—
2006	7	195	Jesse Martin	Canada	C	—	—	—	—	—	—	—	—	—	—
2006	7	200	Arturs Kulda^{†}	Latvia	D	15	0	2	2	8	—	—	—	—	—
2006	7	210	Will O'Neill	United States	D	1	0	0	0	0	—	—	—	—	—
2007	3	67	Spencer Machacek^{†}	Canada	RW	25	2	7	9	7	—	—	—	—	—
2007	4	115	Niclas Lucenius	Finland	C	—	—	—	—	—	—	—	—	—	—
2007	6	175	John Albert	United States	C	9	1	0	1	0	—	—	—	—	—
2007	7	205	Paul Postma^{†}	Canada	D	205	10	25	35	51	—	—	—	—	—
2008	1	3	Zach Bogosian^{†}	United States	D	970	66	183	249	839	—	—	—	—	—
2008	1	29	Daultan Leveille	Canada	C	—	—	—	—	—	—	—	—	—	—
2008	3	64	Danick Paquette	Canada	RW	—	—	—	—	—	—	—	—	—	—
2008	4	94	Vinny Saponari	United States	RW	—	—	—	—	—	—	—	—	—	—
2008	5	124	Nicklas Lasu	Sweden	LW	—	—	—	—	—	—	—	—	—	—
2008	6	154	Chris Carrozzi	Canada	G	—	—	—	—	—	—	—	—	—	—
2008	7	184	Zach Redmond	United States	D	133	9	29	38	50	—	—	—	—	—
2009	1	4	Evander Kane^{†}	Canada	C	1,001	339	309	648	1,278	—	—	—	—	—
2009	2	34	Carl Klingberg^{†}	Sweden	LW	12	1	0	1	4	—	—	—	—	—
2009	2	45	Jeremy Morin	United States	LW	82	10	12	22	69	—	—	—	—	—
2009	4	117	Edward Pasquale	Canada	G	3	0	0	0	0	2	1	—	0	3.96
2009	4	120	Ben Chiarot	Canada	D	805	50	135	185	602	—	—	—	—	—
2009	5	125	Cody Sol	Canada	D	—	—	—	—	—	—	—	—	—	—
2009	6	155	Jimmy Bubnick	Canada	C	—	—	—	—	—	—	—	—	—	—
2009	7	185	Levko Koper	Canada	LW	—	—	—	—	—	—	—	—	—	—
2009	7	203	Jordan Samuels-Thomas	United States	LW	—	—	—	—	—	—	—	—	—	—
2010	1	8	Alexander Burmistrov^{†}	Russia	C	348	37	64	101	139	—	—	—	—	—
2010	3	87	Julian Melchiori	Canada	D	30	0	2	2	8	—	—	—	—	—
2010	4	101	Ivan Telegin	Russia	LW	—	—	—	—	—	—	—	—	—	—
2010	5	128	Fredrik Petterson-Wentzel	Sweden	G	—	—	—	—	—	—	—	—	—	—
2010	5	150	Yasin Cisse	Canada	F	—	—	—	—	—	—	—	—	—	—
2010	6	155	Kendal McFaull	Canada	D	—	—	—	—	—	—	—	—	—	—
2010	6	160	Tanner Lane	United States	F	—	—	—	—	—	—	—	—	—	—
2010	6	169	Sebastian Owuya	Sweden	D	—	—	—	—	—	—	—	—	—	—
2010	7	199	Peter Stoykewych	Canada	D	—	—	—	—	—	—	—	—	—	—

== See also ==
- 1999 NHL expansion draft
- List of Winnipeg Jets draft picks
