= Daultan Leveille =

Canadian ice hockey player (born 1990)

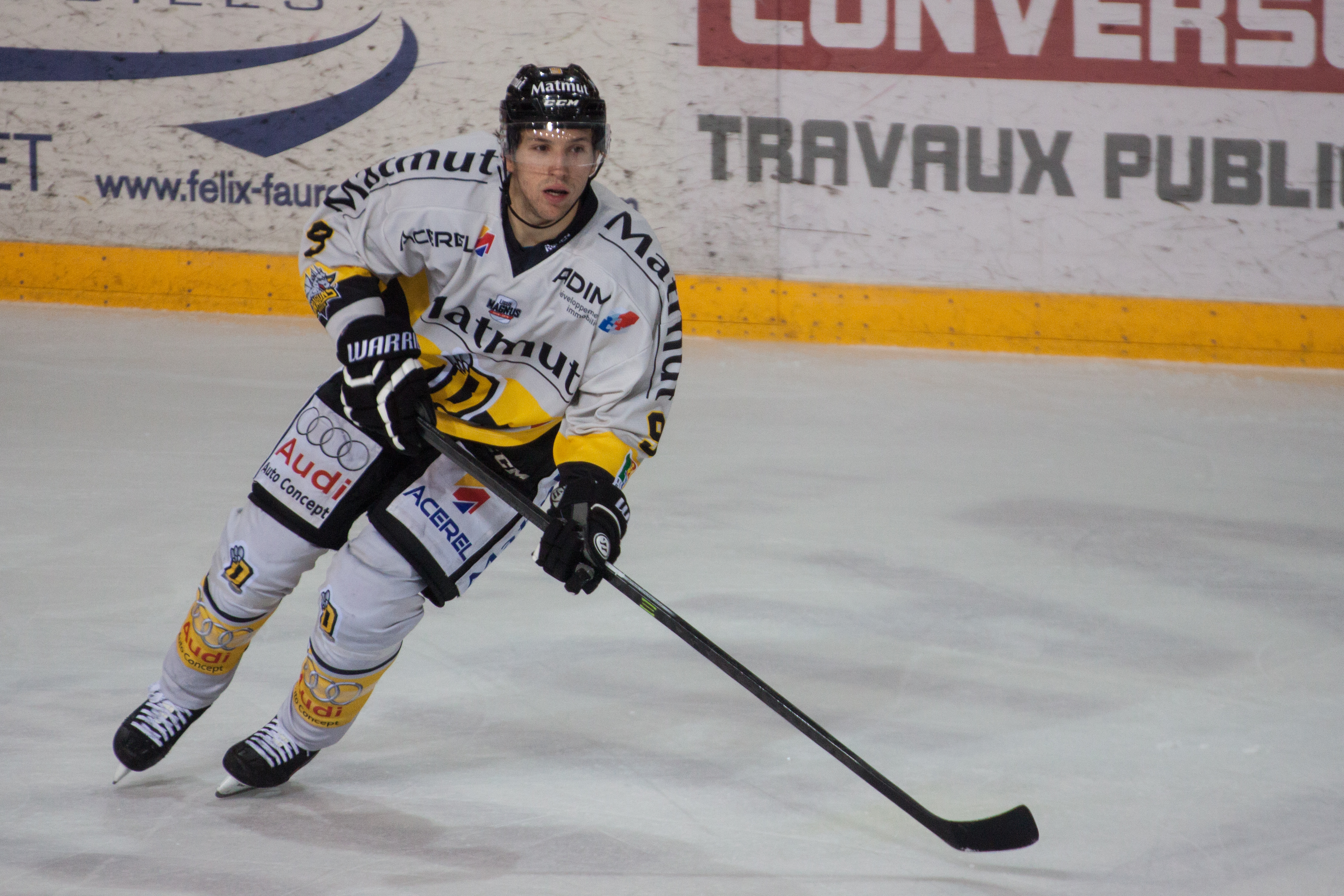
- Born: August 10, 1990 (age 35) St. Catharines, Ontario, Canada
- Height: 5 ft 11 in (180 cm)
- Weight: 160 lb (73 kg; 11 st 6 lb)
- Position: Centre
- Shot: Left
- Played for: Hamilton Bulldogs; Dragons de Rouen; Binghamton Senators
- NHL draft: 29th overall, 2008; Atlanta Thrashers
- Playing career: 2012–2017

Daultan Michael Leveille (born August 10, 1990) is a Canadian former professional ice hockey player. He was drafted by the Atlanta Thrashers in the first round, 29th overall, in the 2008 NHL entry draft, becoming the first player in NHL history to be drafted out of a Jr. B level league in the first round. He never played a game in the NHL.

== Playing career ==
=== Junior ===
Leveille was born in St. Catharines, Ontario. After playing 'AAA' hockey for the St. Catharines Minor Hockey Association all his childhood, Leveille was drafted by the Ottawa 67's in the ninth round of the 2006 OHL Priority Draft. However, Daultan decided to stay close to home, and played two years for the St. Catharines Falcons of the Greater Ontario Junior Hockey League, a Jr. B level league part of the Ontario Hockey Association. During his two seasons with the Falcons, Leveille totaled 48 goals and 101 points in 93 games. In his final year, Leveille, along with six other individuals (including Michael Stone of London, Ontario) was awarded the OHA Top Prospect Award. During his second year, Leveille began to be highly scouted among National Hockey League (NHL) teams, and was selected as high as 27th overall in mock drafts for the 2008 NHL entry draft. During his final year Leveille also played with Riley Sheahan, who would be drafted 21st overall by the Detroit Red Wings in the 2010 NHL entry draft.

Leveille finished his freshman season with the Michigan State Spartans of the Central Collegiate Hockey Association with 17 points in 38 games. He finished second on the team in goals and points, behind senior Matt Schepke. However, Leveille finished the season with a plus/minus of -19, and the Spartans finished with a disappointing 10–23–5 record. Leveille had 25 points the following season and an improved plus/minus of +14.

=== Professional ===
Leveille was drafted by the Atlanta Thrashers during the 2008 NHL entry draft, being selected 29th overall with a pick acquired from the Pittsburgh Penguins during the 2007-08 NHL season trade deadline. His rights were transferred from the Atlanta Thrashers to the Winnipeg Jets on June 22, 2011, due to the Thrashers' franchise relocating. After spending three seasons as a Thrashers/Jets prospect, Leveille was not tendered an offer from the Jets and became an unrestricted free agent on August 15, 2012.

On September 18, 2012, Leveille was signed to a one-year, two way contract by the Hamilton Bulldogs. On October 4, Leveille was released from Bulldogs' training camp and assigned to the San Francisco Bulls of the ECHL. Several days later, Leveille was reassigned to the Bulldogs' ECHL affiliate in Wheeling. Coincidentally, the Nailers share an affiliation with the Pittsburgh Penguins, who once owned the draft pick that was used to draft Leveille.

Leveille scored his first professional goal on October 26, 2012, against the Reading Royals at WesBanco Arena. He scored 12:13 into the 2nd period, putting the Nailers up 5–1.

On July 23, 2013, Leveille signed as a free agent to his third ECHL club, the Evansville IceMen, on a one-year contract. In the 2013-14 season with the IceMen, Leveille contributed with 22 goals and 47 points in 66 games.

On April 29, 2014, Leveille signed a one-year contract abroad with French club, Dragons de Rouen of the Ligue Magnus. In his single season in Europe, Leveille posted 17 points in 26 games before returning to North America in signing a one-year AHL contract for the 2015–16 season with the Binghamton Senators on May 28, 2015.

As a free agent from the Senators in the following off-season, Leveille continue his tenure in the ECHL, signing a one-year deal with the Elmira Jackals on August 18, 2016.

== Career statistics ==
			Regular season					Playoffs
Season	Team	League	GP	G	A	Pts	PIM	GP	G	A	Pts	PIM
2006–07	St. Catharines Falcons	GOJHL	48	19	26	45	30	14	5	6	11	6
2007–08	St. Catharines Falcons	GOJHL	45	29	27	56	38	16	14	16	30	14
2008–09	Michigan State Spartans	CCHA	38	9	8	17	12	—	—	—	—	—
2009–10	Michigan State Spartans	CCHA	38	6	19	25	16	—	—	—	—	—
2010–11	Michigan State Spartans	CCHA	34	8	10	18	18	—	—	—	—	—
2011–12	Michigan State Spartans	CCHA	21	3	6	9	4	—	—	—	—	—
2012–13	Hamilton Bulldogs	AHL	19	0	2	2	4	—	—	—	—	—
2012–13	Wheeling Nailers	ECHL	25	4	3	7	6	—	—	—	—	—
2012–13	San Francisco Bulls	ECHL	6	2	1	3	0	—	—	—	—	—
2013–14	Evansville IceMen	ECHL	66	22	25	47	26	—	—	—	—	—
2014–15	Dragons de Rouen	FRA	26	9	8	17	12	4	1	1	2	2
2015–16	Evansville IceMen	ECHL	55	24	20	44	26	—	—	—	—	—
2015–16	Binghamton Senators	AHL	5	1	1	2	2	—	—	—	—	—
2016–17	Elmira Jackals	ECHL	12	3	5	8	0	—	—	—	—	—
2016–17	Wichita Thunder	ECHL	10	0	3	3	8	—	—	—	—	—
2016–17	Brampton Beast	ECHL	9	1	1	2	4	1	0	0	0	0
ECHL totals			183	56	58	114	70	1	0	0	0	0
AHL totals			24	1	3	4	6	—	—	—	—	—

Awards and achievements
Preceded by Zach Bogosian	Atlanta Thrashers first-round draft pick 2008	Succeeded by Evander Kane
