= Zach Bogosian =

American ice hockey player (born 1990)

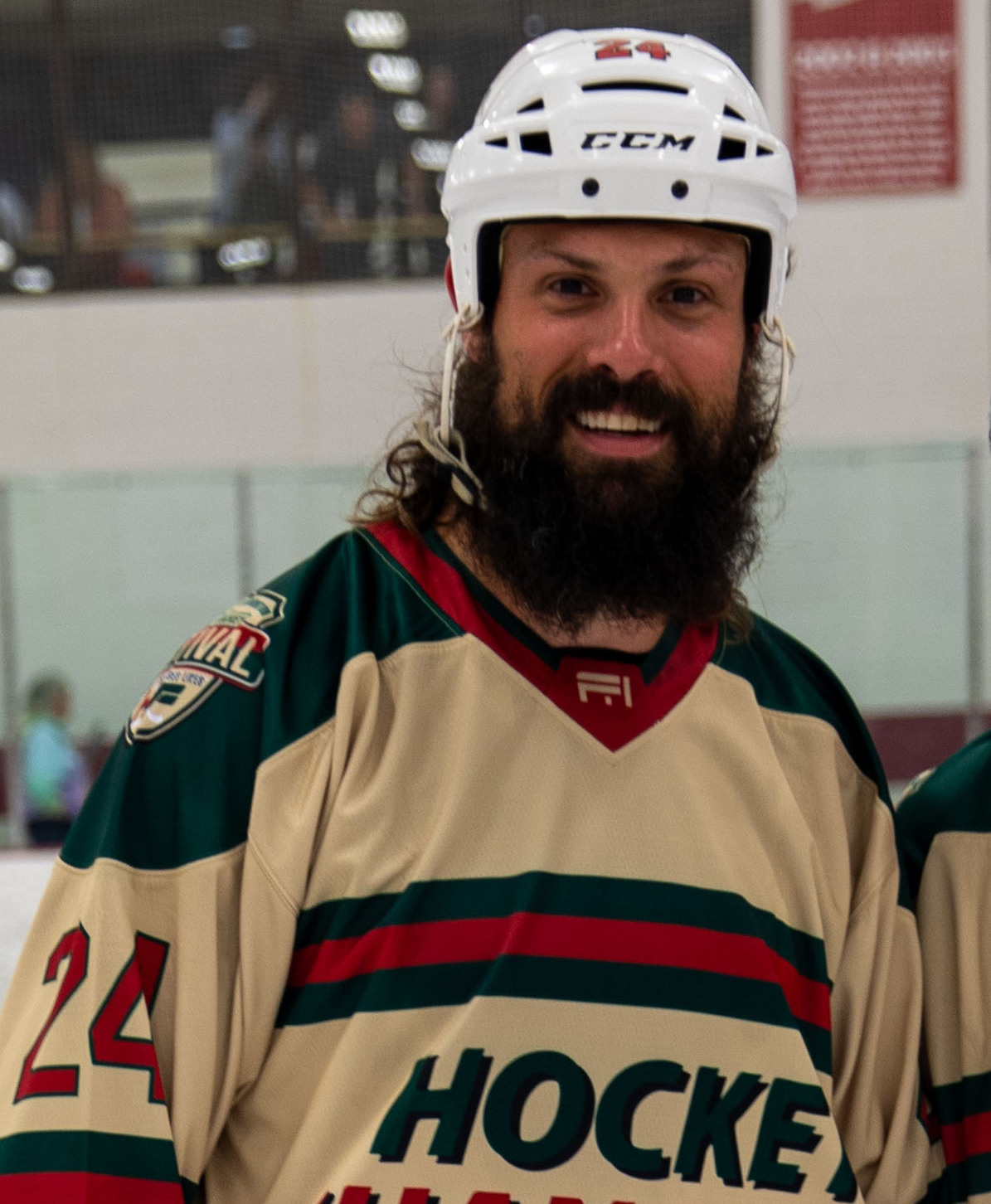
- Bogosian in May 2024
- Born: July 15, 1990 (age 36) Massena, New York, U.S.
- Height: 6 ft 3 in (191 cm)
- Weight: 231 lb (105 kg; 16 st 7 lb)
- Position: Defense
- Shoots: Right
- NHL team Former teams: Minnesota Wild; Atlanta Thrashers; Winnipeg Jets; Buffalo Sabres; Tampa Bay Lightning; Toronto Maple Leafs
- National team: United States
- NHL draft: 3rd overall, 2008; Atlanta Thrashers
- Playing career: 2008–present

Zach Bogosian (born July 15, 1990) is an American professional ice hockey player who is a defenseman for the Minnesota Wild of the National Hockey League (NHL). He has previously played for the Atlanta Thrashers, Winnipeg Jets, Buffalo Sabres, Tampa Bay Lightning and Toronto Maple Leafs. Bogosian won the Stanley Cup as a member of the Lightning in 2020.

Nicknamed "Bogo", Bogosian is regarded as a complete, physical defenseman who could contribute on both offense and defense; he was rated as one of the top players heading into the 2008 NHL entry draft, where the Atlanta Thrashers selected him third overall. Bogosian first played in an international tournament when he joined the American national team at the 2009 IIHF World Championship.

== Playing career ==
=== Junior ===
In 2004, Bogosian entered high school at Cushing Academy, a prep school in Massachusetts. The assistant coach of the school's hockey team was Ray Bourque, a former NHL defenseman who was elected to the Hockey Hall of Fame. Bogosian's teammates at Cushing included his older brother, Aaron, and Bourque's son, Ryan. While at Cushing he was used mostly as a fifth or sixth defenseman and played few minutes as a result. After his second year at the school, Bogosian was selected 19th overall in the 2006 Ontario Hockey League (OHL) Priority Draft by the Peterborough Petes Bogosian's decision to play in the OHL rather than go to the NCAA differed from most of his teammates, including his brother. As his father and uncle had also played college football in the NCAA, it was expected that Bogosian would follow them in going to university. He cited watching Ottawa 67's games at age nine as a major influence in deciding to play in Canada.

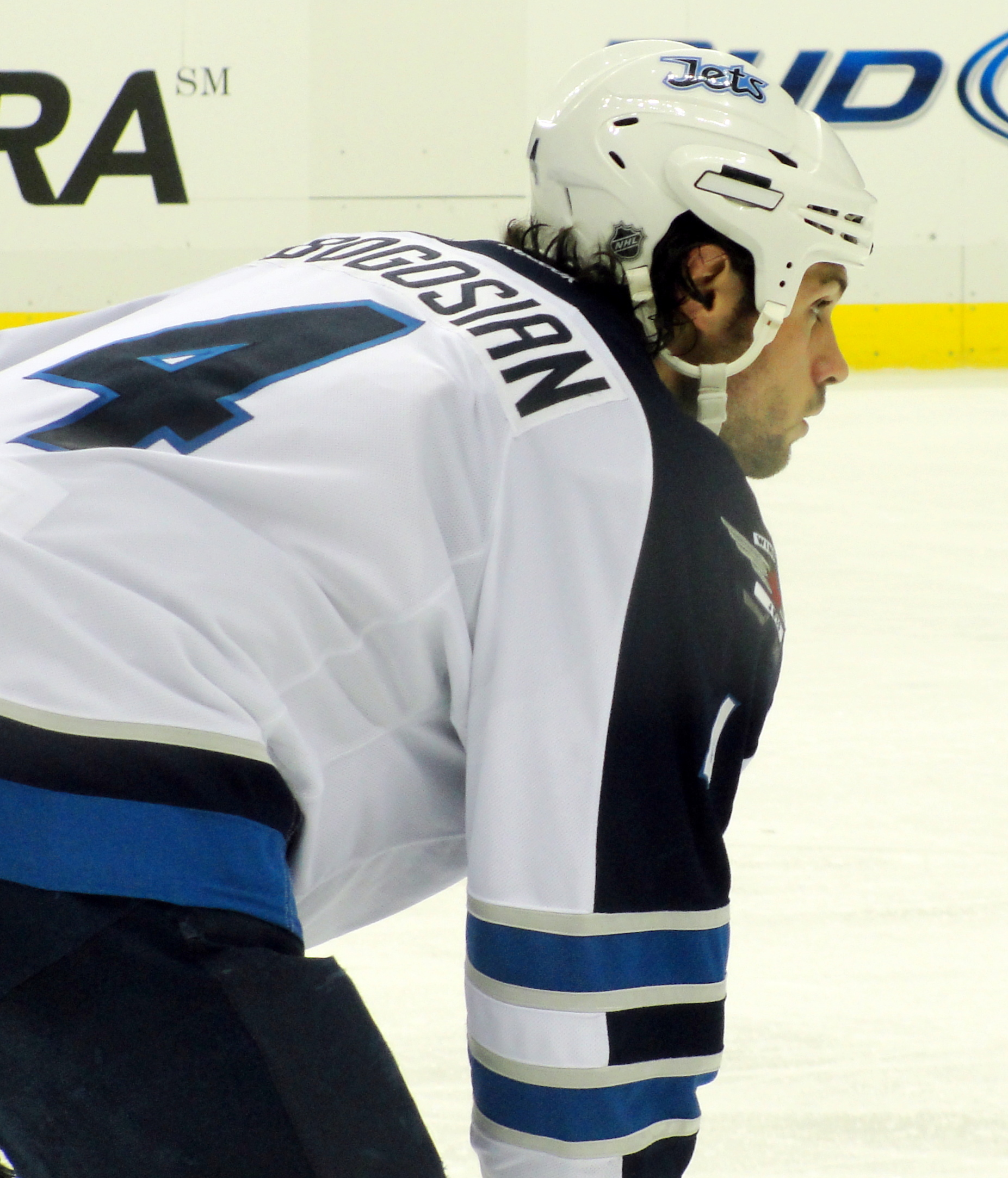
Bogosian in February 2012

Bogosian began playing for the Petes in the 2006–07 season. He played 67 games for the team and finished with 7 goals and 26 assists for 33 points, which was second on the team in points for both rookies and defensemen. In recognition of his season, he was named to the OHL's Second All-Rookie Team, as one of the top four rookie defensemen in the league. The next season, Bogosian appeared in 60 games for the Petes. He led his team in scoring with 61 points (11 goals, 50 assists), the only defenseman in the league do so; the 50 assists he scored were second in the league among defensemen. The Petes reached the playoffs after missing the previous year, and Bogosian added another three assists in five games. During the season, he participated in both the OHL All-Star Classic and the CHL Top Prospects Game, an all-star game of prospects from the three leagues in the Canadian Hockey League (Western Hockey League, Quebec Major Junior Hockey League and OHL). At the conclusion of the season, Bogosian was named one of the five draft-eligible finalists for the Red Tilson Trophy as most outstanding player in the OHL, and was also named to the OHL First All-Star Team as one of the two best defensemen in the league.

Prior to the 2008 NHL entry draft, Bogosian was ranked by the NHL Central Scouting Bureau as the second best North American skater for the draft and the third ranked prospect out of the OHL. He was drafted third overall by the Atlanta Thrashers behind Steven Stamkos and Drew Doughty. He was noted by his coach in Peterborough, Vince Malette, to be a "very physical defenseman who is a complete player" and defensively solid who could skate well with the puck and not lose speed. Thrashers general manager Don Waddell liked the physical aspect Bogosian brought to a game, as well as his ability to help score goals while at the same time stop other teams' top players. Bogosian had been noted prior for the draft for his dedication to training, as he drove more than 90 minutes to Ottawa to get a better work out.

=== Professional ===
==== Atlanta Thrashers / Winnipeg Jets ====
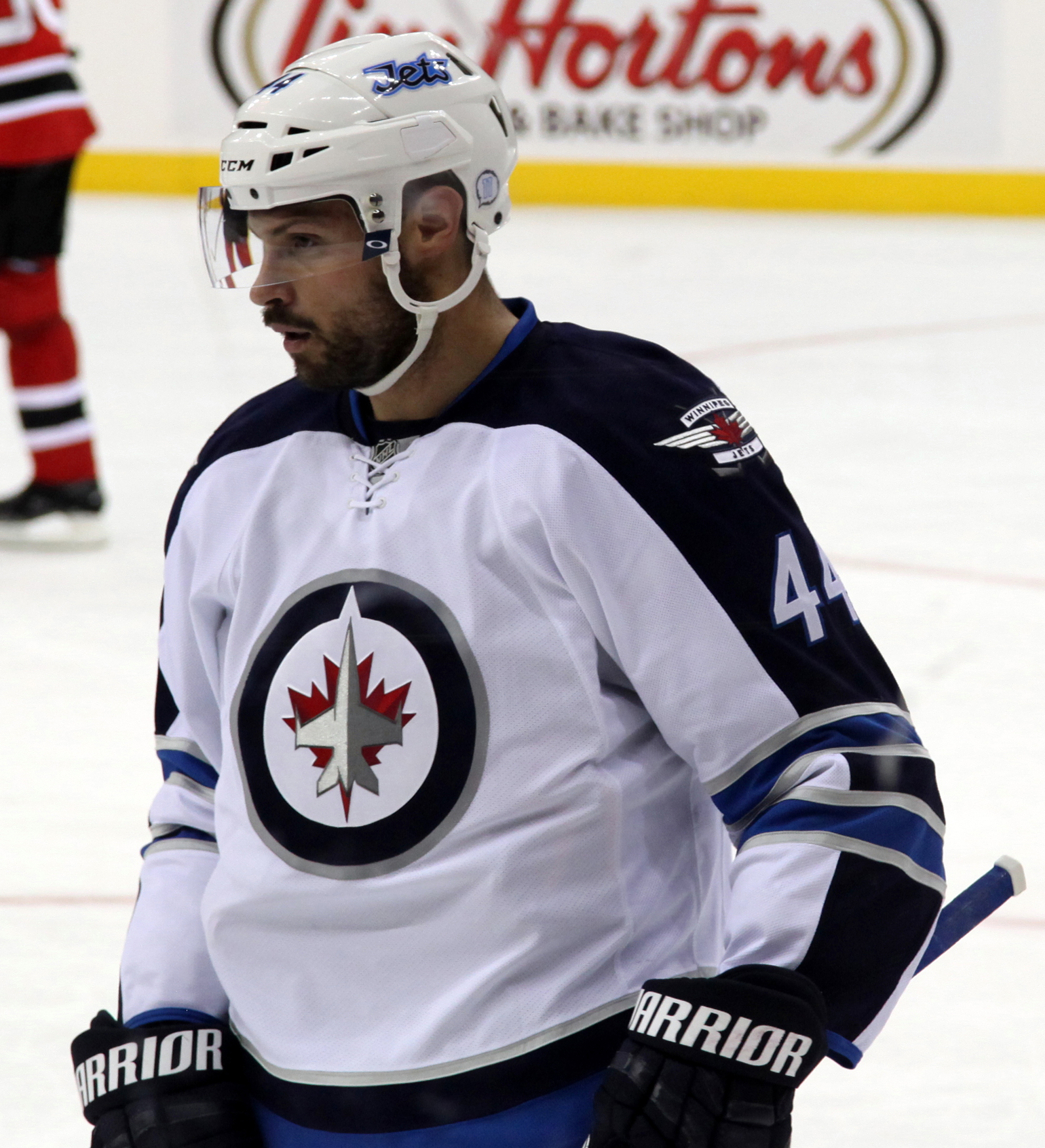
Bogosian in October 2014

In July 2008, Bogosian attended the Thrashers prospect development camp. The youngest player of the 32 at the camp, he stood out as one of the best players there and effectively assured himself a roster spot on the team. On September 4, 2008, Bogosian signed a three-year, entry-level contract worth $2.625 million with the Thrashers. He was named to the team's opening day lineup, and made his NHL debut in the first game of the season on October 10 against the Washington Capitals. Bogosian became the youngest person to play for the Thrashers that night at 18 years and 87 days, surpassing Ilya Kovalchuk (18 years, 172 days). Twenty-four seconds into his first shift, Bogosian was called for a holding penalty, while later in the contest, he had a fight with Capitals enforcer Donald Brashear. Eight games into the season, however, on October 28, Bogosian broke his left leg in a game against the Philadelphia Flyers. Prior to rejoining the Thrashers, Bogosian was sent to their American Hockey League (AHL) affiliate, the Chicago Wolves, for conditioning. After playing five games with the Wolves, including scoring his first professional goal on January 3, 2009, against the Rockford IceHogs, Bogosian rejoined the Thrashers for the remainder of the season. He scored his first NHL goal and recorded his first assist in his twelfth game on January 17, 2009, against Pekka Rinne of the Nashville Predators. Bogosian finished his first professional season with 19 points in 47 NHL games and 1 goal in 5 AHL games as the Thrashers finished out of the playoffs.

Throughout the 2009–10 season Bogosian was bothered by an injury. During a game against the Ottawa Senators on October 31, 2009, Bogosian fell behind his team's net; with his left hand lying on the net's iron frame along the ice, another player fell on top of him. The impact broke his left thumb and injured his wrist. Though he did not miss any time from the injury, it had an effect on his offensive play; Bogosian was perceived to be more hesitant with the puck, choosing to pass it more often than shooting. In the first 17 games of the season, he had scored 8 goals, then went 29 contests without scoring. In the final 64 games, he only scored 2 goals. After he recovered, Bogosian admitted he did not play at his full capacity, but had decided not to disclose the injury to the team until the season finished in April 2010. Regardless of his injury, Bogosian only missed one game throughout the season, a game on March 14 against the Phoenix Coyotes. Even with these setbacks, Bogosian set career highs for games played (81), goals (10), assists (13) and points (23). The 10 goals he scored tied a team record for most by a defenseman in a season, first set by Yannick Tremblay in 1999–2000, the Thrashers' inaugural year. He also set a team record with 196 hits. Again the Thrashers missed the playoffs. After the Atlanta Thrashers were sold to True North Sports & Entertainment and were relocated to Winnipeg, Bogosian agreed to terms on a new two-year, $5 million contract with the Winnipeg Jets on September 14, 2011.

==== Buffalo Sabres ====
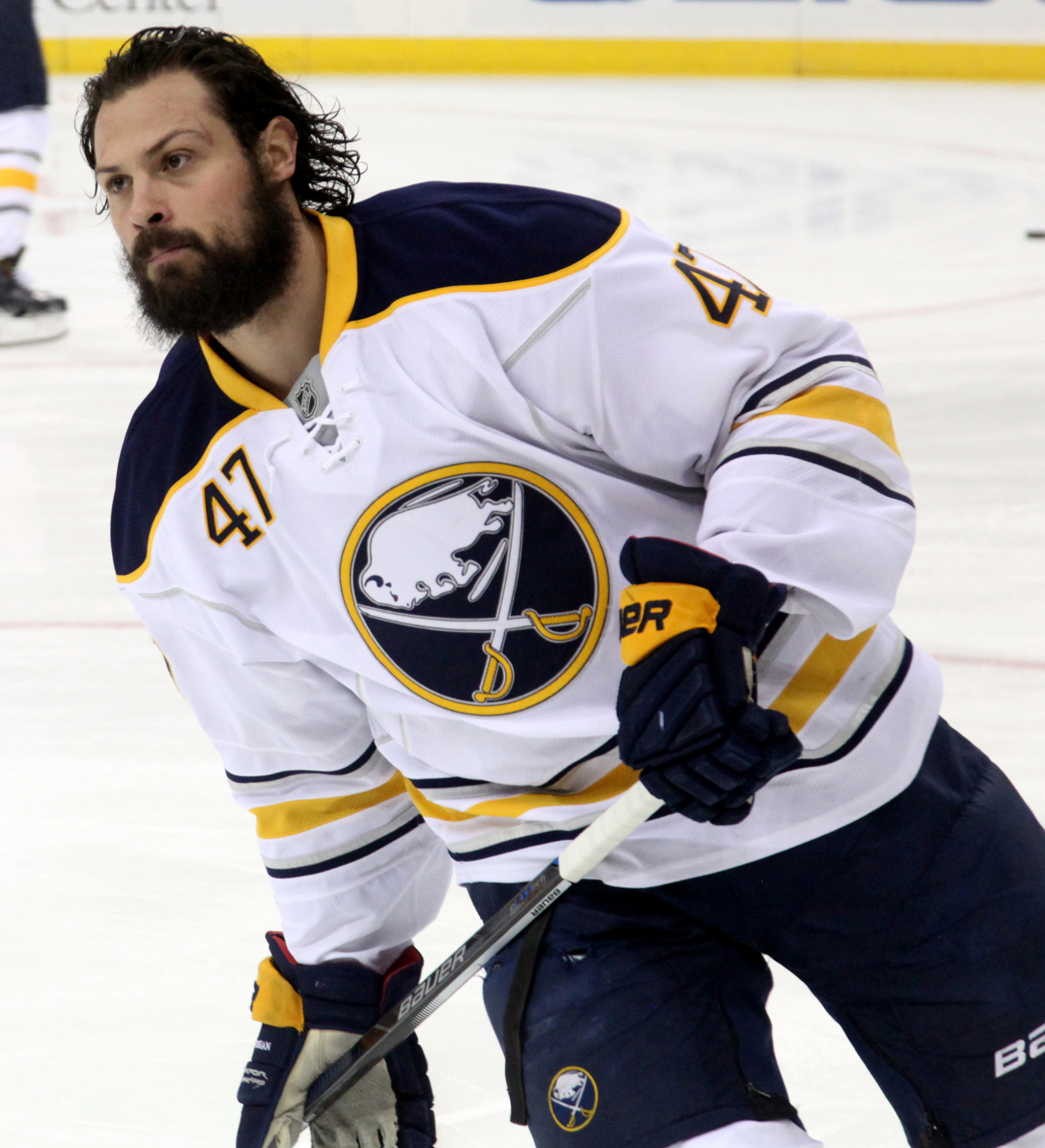
Bogosian in April 2016

During the 2014–15 season, his seventh with the Thrashers/Jets franchise, Bogosian was traded alongside Evander Kane and the rights to Jason Kasdorf, to the Buffalo Sabres in exchange for Tyler Myers, Drew Stafford, Brendan Lemieux, Joel Armia, and a conditional first-round pick (Jack Roslovic) in the 2015 NHL entry draft.

On February 14, 2020, the Sabres placed Bogosian on waivers. After going unclaimed, he was assigned to the Rochester Americans the following day. Three days later, Bogosian was suspended by the Sabres for failing to report to Rochester. On February 21, Bogosian was placed on unconditional waivers for the purpose of a contract termination.

==== Tampa Bay Lightning ====
As a free agent, Bogosian drew league interest before signing a one-year, $1.3 million contract with the Tampa Bay Lightning on February 23, 2020. On August 3, 2020, Bogosian skated in his first career NHL playoff game. On August 15, 2020, Bogosian recorded his first career NHL playoff assist and point in a 3–2 game 3 victory over the Columbus Blue Jackets. On September 28, 2020, Bogosian won the Stanley Cup for the first time.

==== Toronto Maple Leafs ====
As a free agent, Bogosian signed a one-year, $1 million contract with the Toronto Maple Leafs on October 10, 2020. In the 2020–21 season, Bogosian was a regular physical presence on the blueline with the Maple Leafs, registering 4 assists through 45 regular season games. He collected 1 assist in 7 game first-round series defeat in the post-season to the Montreal Canadiens. Bogosian's play was praised by analysts for his performance in a depth role, and the team made attempts to re-sign him, although were unable to among rumors that Bogosian was unhappy with the Canadian and Ontario governments' public health restrictions in response to COVID-19.

==== Return to Tampa Bay ====
As a free agent from the Maple Leafs, Bogosian opted to return to the two-time defending champion Tampa Bay Lightning in agreeing to a three-year, $2.55 million contract on July 28, 2021.

==== Minnesota Wild ====
On November 8, 2023, Bogosian was traded to the Minnesota Wild in exchange for a 2025 seventh-round pick. On March 6, 2024, the Wild signed Bogosian to a two-year contract extension.

== International ==
Bogosian made his international debut with the American national team at the 2009 IIHF World Championship in Switzerland. He appeared in all nine games for the team, and recorded one assist, in a game against France, as the Americans finished fourth overall. During the 2009–10 season he was mentioned as a candidate to join the American team at the 2010 Winter Olympics in Vancouver, but a wrist and thumb injury led to a decrease in performance and he was ultimately not selected. He was invited to join the American team at the 2010 IIHF World Championship, but declined in order to heal his injuries.

== Personal life ==
Bogosian was born to Ike and Vicky Bogosian in Massena, New York, a town of 13,000 adjacent to the Saint Lawrence River. Zach is the first NHL player of Armenian descent; his great-grandfather, Stephen Bogosian, left Western Armenia in 1923 at the age of 16 as a result of the Armenian genocide. Zach's father Ike was an athlete when he was younger, playing college football with Syracuse University from 1979 to 1981. In his senior season at Syracuse Ike was co-captain of the team with future New York Giants running back Joe Morris. He currently runs a carpet and floor cleaning business with his brother in Massena. Vicky works as a hairdresser and formally a teacher at Nightingale Elementary School in Massena, NY. Zach has two older brothers, Ike Jr. and Aaron. Aaron was also a professional ice hockey player who attended St. Lawrence University where he played four seasons with the Saints and served as team captain. Aaron most recently played in the ECHL with the Florida Everblades.

Bogosian joined the Massena Minor Hockey Association when he was 3, staying in the program until he was 14, when he left for Cushing Academy. Bogosian first began to play defense at the Squirt level (under-10); though he was smaller than most of his peers, he was a good skater. He alternated between forward and defense throughout minor hockey. When he began attending Cushing Academy he was a forward the first year, before he converted to a defender full-time. After leaving the school and moving to Canada with two years of high school to complete, Bogosian took courses on the internet.

Bogosian is married to Boston Breakers and former United States women's national under-23 soccer team midfielder Bianca D'Agostino. The pair married in August 2015. They met in Winnipeg. The couple has four children.

== Career statistics ==
=== Regular season and playoffs ===
			Regular season					Playoffs
Season	Team	League	GP	G	A	Pts	PIM	GP	G	A	Pts	PIM
2004–05	Cushing Academy	HS-MA	34	0	1	1	—	—	—	—	—	—
2005–06	Cushing Academy	HS-MA	36	1	16	17	—	—	—	—	—	—
2006–07	Peterborough Petes	OHL	67	7	26	33	63	—	—	—	—	—
2007–08	Peterborough Petes	OHL	60	11	50	61	72	5	0	3	3	8
2008–09	Atlanta Thrashers	NHL	47	9	10	19	47	—	—	—	—	—
2008–09	Chicago Wolves	AHL	5	1	0	1	0	—	—	—	—	—
2009–10	Atlanta Thrashers	NHL	81	10	13	23	61	—	—	—	—	—
2010–11	Atlanta Thrashers	NHL	71	5	12	17	29	—	—	—	—	—
2011–12	Winnipeg Jets	NHL	65	5	25	30	71	—	—	—	—	—
2012–13	Winnipeg Jets	NHL	33	5	9	14	29	—	—	—	—	—
2013–14	Winnipeg Jets	NHL	55	3	8	11	48	—	—	—	—	—
2014–15	Winnipeg Jets	NHL	41	3	10	13	40	—	—	—	—	—
2014–15	Buffalo Sabres	NHL	21	0	7	7	38	—	—	—	—	—
2015–16	Buffalo Sabres	NHL	64	7	17	24	68	—	—	—	—	—
2016–17	Buffalo Sabres	NHL	56	2	9	11	46	—	—	—	—	—
2017–18	Buffalo Sabres	NHL	18	0	1	1	20	—	—	—	—	—
2018–19	Buffalo Sabres	NHL	65	3	16	19	52	—	—	—	—	—
2019–20	Buffalo Sabres	NHL	19	1	4	5	10	—	—	—	—	—
2019–20	Tampa Bay Lightning	NHL	8	0	2	2	12	20	0	4	4	12
2020–21	Toronto Maple Leafs	NHL	45	0	4	4	49	7	0	1	1	0
2021–22	Tampa Bay Lightning	NHL	48	3	5	8	53	22	0	3	3	4
2022–23	Tampa Bay Lightning	NHL	46	1	4	5	42	5	0	1	1	7
2023–24	Tampa Bay Lightning	NHL	4	0	0	0	0	—	—	—	—	—
2023–24	Minnesota Wild	NHL	61	3	11	14	63	—	—	—	—	—
2024–25	Minnesota Wild	NHL	81	4	12	16	43	6	0	1	1	0
2025–26	Minnesota Wild	NHL	41	2	4	6	18	9	0	0	0	4
NHL totals			970	66	183	249	839	69	0	10	10	27

=== International ===
Year	Team	Event	Result	GP	G	A	Pts	PIM
2009	United States	WC	4th	9	0	1	1	2
Senior totals				9	0	1	1	2

== Awards and honors ==
Award	Year	Ref
OHL
Second All-Rookie Team	2007	
CHL/NHL Top Prospects Game	2008	
First All-Star Team	2008	
NHL
Stanley Cup champion	2020	

Awards and achievements
Preceded by Bryan Little	Atlanta Thrashers first-round draft pick 2008	Succeeded by Daultan Leveille
