= Marc Bergevin =

Canadian ice hockey player and executive

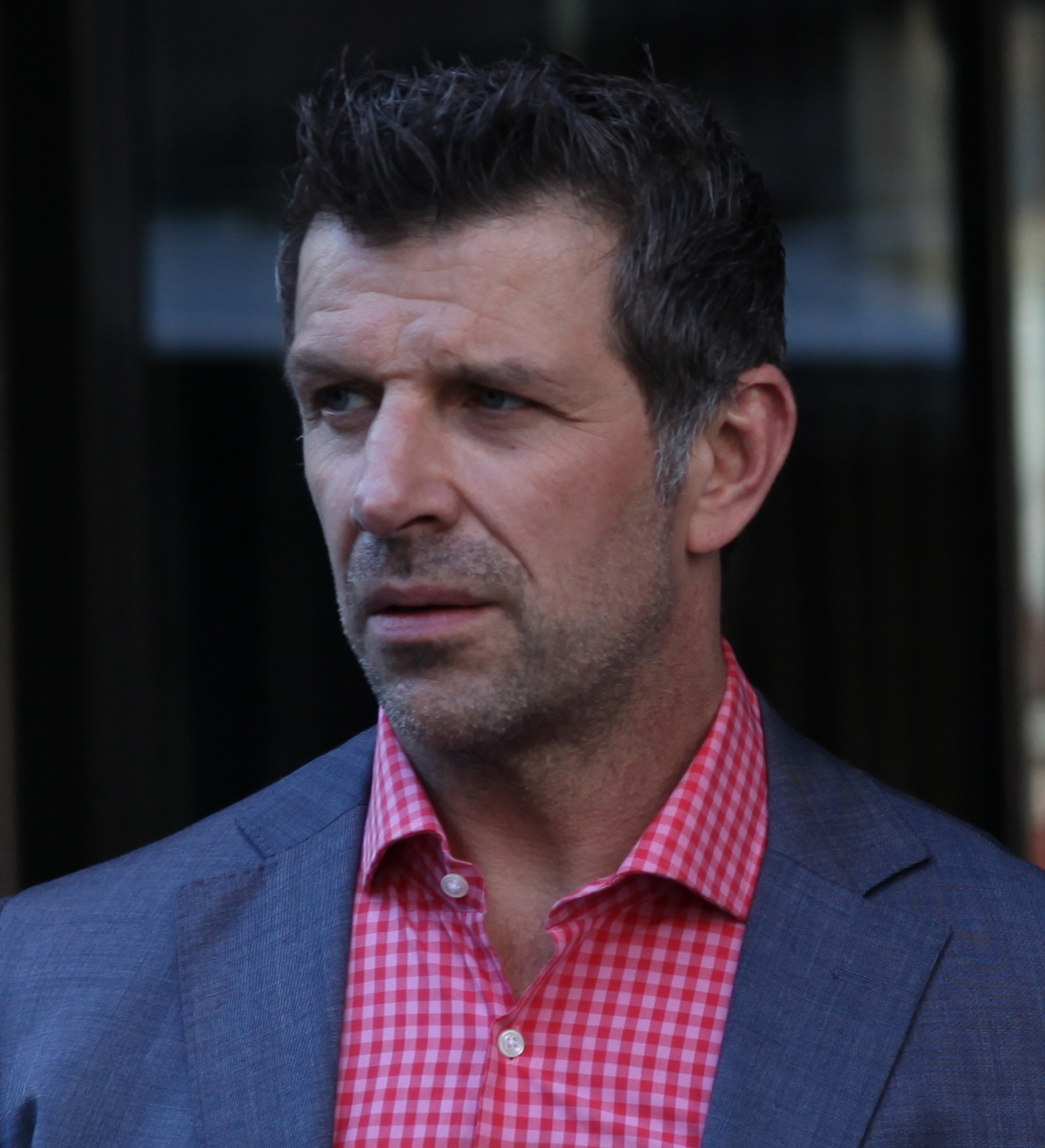
- Bergevin in 2014
- Born: August 11, 1965 (age 61) Montreal, Quebec, Canada
- Height: 6 ft 0 in (183 cm)
- Weight: 185 lb (84 kg; 13 st 3 lb)
- Position: Defence
- Shot: Left
- Played for: Chicago Blackhawks; New York Islanders; Hartford Whalers; Tampa Bay Lightning; Detroit Red Wings; St. Louis Blues; Pittsburgh Penguins; Vancouver Canucks
- National team: Canada
- NHL draft: 59th overall, 1983; Chicago Black Hawks
- Playing career: 1984–2004

Marc Bergevin (born August 11, 1965) is a Canadian professional ice hockey executive and former player. He is currently associate general manager of the Buffalo Sabres. Bergevin played as a defenceman in the National Hockey League.

== Playing career ==
As a youth, Bergevin played in the 1978 Quebec International Pee-Wee Hockey Tournament with a minor ice hockey team from Ville-Émard, which included Mario Lemieux and J. J. Daigneault.

Bergevin was drafted by the NHL's Chicago Black Hawks in the 1983 NHL entry draft, third round, 59th overall. After a junior career with the Chicoutimi Saguenéens of the Quebec Major Junior Hockey League (QMJHL), he made the Black Hawks in 1984 and played with Chicago for the next five seasons before being traded to the New York Islanders. His career with the Islanders was brief, and he spent much of that time with their American Hockey League (AHL) affiliate Springfield Indians, whom he helped lead to consecutive Calder Cup championships in 1990 and 1991. In the 1991 season he was traded to the Hartford Whalers and became a fan favorite for his skilled checking. The 1991–92 season was his best, statistically, scoring 7 goals and 17 assists for 24 points.

Bergevin went on to sign with the expansion Tampa Bay Lightning the next season, becoming a leader for the fledgling franchise and continuing to play skillfully enough to be named to the gold medal-winning Canadian national team for the 1994 World Championships. After three years with the Lightning, he played for the Detroit Red Wings, St. Louis Blues, Pittsburgh Penguins and the Vancouver Canucks, and was known for his practical jokes in the locker room.

Bergevin served as an alternate captain during part of his time with the Penguins, Lightning and Blues.

== Retirement ==
Bergevin retired after the 2003–04 NHL season, and despite two stints in the minors and serious injuries in his final years, was in the top 100 in NHL history at the time of his retirement in games played in the NHL with 1,191. He finished his career with 36 goals, 145 assists for 181 points and 1,090 penalty minutes.

== Management career ==
After his retirement, Bergevin was a professional scout with the Blackhawks' organization. In 2008, he served as an assistant coach for the Blackhawks after three seasons with their scouting staff. In July 2009, he was appointed the team's director of player personnel. While in this position, the Blackhawks won the Stanley Cup in 2010.

On June 15, 2011, Bergevin was promoted to assistant general manager of the Chicago Blackhawks. He replaced Kevin Cheveldayoff, who had left the Blackhawks organization to accept the general manager position with the new Winnipeg Jets team.

On May 2, 2012, Bergevin was named general manager and executive vice president of the Montreal Canadiens. His first additions to the Canadiens included Rick Dudley as assistant general manager, Scott Mellanby as director of player personnel, Martin Lapointe as director of player development and Michel Therrien as head coach. Other additions included the hiring of Kirk Muller as an associate coach in 2016, as well as Gerard Gallant, J. J. Daigneault and Clément Jodoin as assistant coaches. Bergevin also appointed former Canadiens defenseman Patrice Brisebois as player development coach on June 13, 2012. He finished second in voting for the General Manager of the Year award for the 2013–14 season, and again in the 2020–21 season.

On November 28, 2021, Bergevin was fired from the Montreal Canadiens.

On January 9, 2022, Bergevin was hired as a senior advisor to the general manager for the Los Angeles Kings.

On December 20, 2025, Bergevin left the Kings to join the Buffalo Sabres as the team's associate general manager under Jarmo Kekäläinen.

== Career statistics ==
=== Regular season and playoffs ===
			Regular season					Playoffs
Season	Team	League	GP	G	A	Pts	PIM	GP	G	A	Pts	PIM
1981–82	Montréal-Concordia	QMAAA	44	10	20	30	54	5	0	2	2	4
1982–83	Chicoutimi Saguenéens	QMJHL	64	3	27	30	113	5	0	0	0	26
1983–84	Chicoutimi Saguenéens	QMJHL	70	10	35	45	125	—	—	—	—	—
1983–84	Springfield Indians	AHL	7	0	1	1	2	4	0	0	0	0
1984–85	Chicoutimi Saguenéens	QMJHL	2	0	1	1	4	—	—	—	—	—
1984–85	Chicago Black Hawks	NHL	60	0	6	6	54	6	0	3	3	2
1985–86	Chicago Black Hawks	NHL	71	7	7	14	60	3	0	0	0	0
1986–87	Chicago Blackhawks	NHL	66	4	10	14	66	3	1	0	1	2
1987–88	Chicago Blackhawks	NHL	58	1	6	7	85	—	—	—	—	—
1987–88	Saginaw Hawks	IHL	10	2	7	9	20	—	—	—	—	—
1988–89	Chicago Blackhawks	NHL	11	0	0	0	18	—	—	—	—	—
1988–89	New York Islanders	NHL	58	2	13	15	62	—	—	—	—	—
1989–90	Springfield Indians	AHL	47	7	16	23	66	17	2	11	13	16
1989–90	New York Islanders	NHL	18	0	4	4	30	1	0	0	0	2
1990–91	Capital District Islanders	AHL	7	0	5	5	6	—	—	—	—	—
1990–91	Hartford Whalers	NHL	4	0	0	0	4	—	—	—	—	—
1990–91	Springfield Indians	AHL	58	4	23	27	85	18	0	7	7	26
1991–92	Hartford Whalers	NHL	75	7	17	24	64	5	0	0	0	2
1992–93	Tampa Bay Lightning	NHL	78	2	12	14	66	—	—	—	—	—
1993–94	Tampa Bay Lightning	NHL	83	1	15	16	87	—	—	—	—	—
1994–95	Tampa Bay Lightning	NHL	44	2	4	6	51	—	—	—	—	—
1995–96	Detroit Red Wings	NHL	70	1	9	10	33	17	1	0	1	14
1996–97	St. Louis Blues	NHL	82	0	4	4	53	6	1	0	1	8
1997–98	St. Louis Blues	NHL	81	3	7	10	90	10	0	1	1	8
1998–99	St. Louis Blues	NHL	52	1	1	2	99	—	—	—	—	—
1999–2000	St. Louis Blues	NHL	81	1	8	9	75	7	0	1	1	6
2000–01	St. Louis Blues	NHL	2	0	0	0	0	—	—	—	—	—
2000–01	Pittsburgh Penguins	NHL	36	1	4	5	26	12	0	1	1	2
2001–02	St. Louis Blues	NHL	30	0	3	3	2	7	0	0	0	4
2001–02	Worcester IceCats	AHL	2	0	0	0	0	—	—	—	—	—
2002–03	Pittsburgh Penguins	NHL	69	2	5	7	36	—	—	—	—	—
2002–03	Tampa Bay Lightning	NHL	1	0	0	0	0	—	—	—	—	—
2003–04	Pittsburgh Penguins	NHL	52	1	8	9	27	—	—	—	—	—
2003–04	Vancouver Canucks	NHL	9	0	2	2	2	3	0	0	0	2
AHL totals			121	11	45	56	159	39	2	18	20	42
NHL totals			1,191	36	145	181	1,090	80	3	6	9	52

=== International ===
Medal record

Representing Canada

World Championships
Gold medal – first place	1994 Italy	

Year	Team	Event	Result	GP	G	A	Pts	PIM
1994	Canada	WC	1st place, gold medalist(s)	8	0	0	0	2
Senior totals				0	0	0	0	2

== See also ==
- List of NHL players with 1,000 games played

Preceded by Pierre Gauthier	General Manager of the Montreal Canadiens; 2012–2021	Succeeded by Kent Hughes
