= List of Atlanta Thrashers/Winnipeg Jets general managers =

The Winnipeg Jets are a Canadian professional ice hockey team based in Winnipeg, Manitoba. They play in the Central Division of the Western Conference in the National Hockey League (NHL). The team joined the NHL in 1999 as an expansion team as the Atlanta Thrashers, but moved to Winnipeg, Manitoba in 2011, being renamed after the previous Winnipeg Jets team (now playing as the Arizona Coyotes). The Jets play their home games at the MTS Centre. There have been three general managers since the franchise's inception.

== Key ==
Key of terms and definitions
Term	Definition
No.	Number of general managers^{[a]}
Ref(s)	References
–	Does not apply
†	Elected to the Hockey Hall of Fame in the Builder category

== General managers ==
General managers of the Winnipeg Jets/Atlanta Thrashers
No.	Name	Tenure	Accomplishments during this term	Ref(s)
–	Annis Stukus	December 2, 1971 – July 1974		
–	Rudy Pilous†	July 1974 – November 22, 1978	Won Avco World Trophy 2 times (1975–76, 1977–78)	
1	John Ferguson, Sr.	November 22, 1978 – October 30, 1988	Won Avco World Trophy (1978–79); 7 playoff appearances	
2	Mike Smith	October 30, 1988 – January 19, 1994	3 playoff appearances	
3	John Paddock	January 19, 1994 – June 30, 1996	1 playoff appearance	
4	Don Waddell	July 1, 1998 – April 14, 2010	1 division title and 1 playoff appearance	
5	Rick Dudley	April 14, 2010 – June 4, 2011	No playoff appearances	
6	Kevin Cheveldayoff	June 8, 2011 – present	Won Presidents' Trophy (2024–25); 1 division title and 8 playoff appearances	

== See also ==
- List of NHL general managers

== Notes ==
- ^{a} A running total of the number of general managers of the franchise. Thus any general manager who has two or more separate terms as general manager is only counted once. WHA general managers are not counted towards the total.
