= List of Hartford Whalers/Carolina Hurricanes general managers =

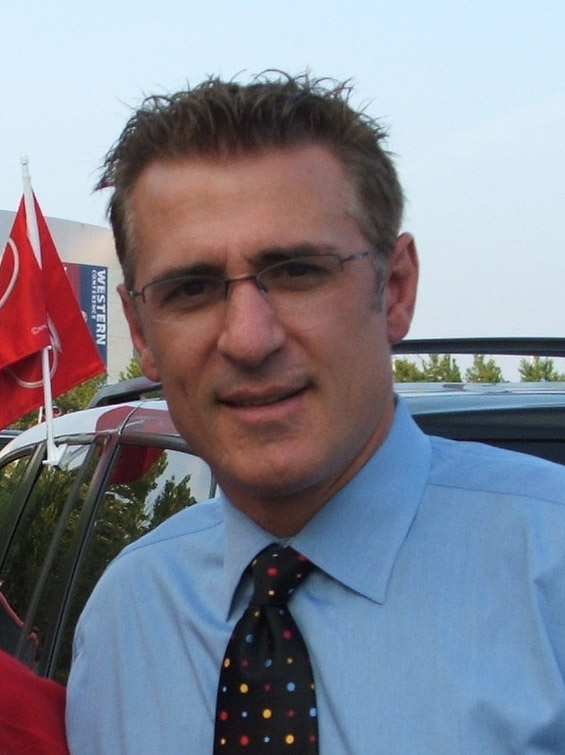
Ron Francis was the general manager of the Carolina Hurricanes from 2014 to 2018.

The Carolina Hurricanes are an American professional ice hockey team based in Raleigh, North Carolina. They play in the Metropolitan Division of the Eastern Conference in the National Hockey League (NHL). The team joined the NHL in 1979, as an expansion team as the Hartford Whalers, but moved to Raleigh, North Carolina in 1997. Having first played at the Greensboro Coliseum, the Hurricanes have played their home games at the PNC Arena, which was first named the Raleigh Entertainment & Sports Arena, since 1999. There have been ten general managers in franchise history since entering the NHL.

== Key ==
Key of terms and definitions
Term	Definition
No.	Number of general managers^{[a]}
Ref(s)	References
–	Does not apply
†	Elected to the Hockey Hall of Fame in the Builder category

== General managers ==
General managers of the Carolina Hurricanes franchise
No.	Name	Tenure	Accomplishments during this term	Ref(s)
–	Jack Kelley	April 1, 1972 – December 26, 1975	Won Avco World Trophy (1972–73)	
–	Ron Ryan	December 26, 1975 – May 5, 1977		
1	Jack Kelley	May 5, 1977 – April 2, 1981	1 playoff appearance	
2	Larry Pleau	April 2, 1981 – May 2, 1983	No playoff appearances	
3	Emile Francis†	May 2, 1983 – May 11, 1989	1 division title and 4 playoff appearances	
4	Ed Johnston	May 11, 1989 – May 12, 1992	3 playoff appearances	
5	Brian Burke	May 26, 1992 – October 6, 1993	No playoff appearances	
6	Paul Holmgren	October 6, 1993 – June 28, 1994	No playoff appearances	
7	Jim Rutherford†	June 28, 1994 – April 28, 2014	Won Stanley Cup 1 time in 2 finals appearances (2002, 2006); 2 conference titles, 3 division titles, and 5 playoff appearances	
8	Ron Francis	April 28, 2014 – March 7, 2018	No playoff appearances	
9	Don Waddell	May 8, 2018 – May 24, 2024	3 division titles, 6 playoff appearances	
10	Eric Tulsky	May 24, 2024 – present	1 Metropolitan Division Title (2025-2026); 2 playoff appearances and 1 Eastern Conference Title; Won Stanley Cup (2026)	

== See also ==
- List of NHL general managers

== Notes ==
- ^{a} A running total of the number of general managers of the franchise. Thus any general manager who has two or more separate terms as general manager is only counted once. WHA general managers are not counted towards the total.
