= Ryan Hughes (ice hockey) =

Canadian ice hockey player

- Born: January 17, 1972 (age 54) Montreal, Quebec, Canada
- Height: 6 ft 1 in (185 cm)
- Weight: 196 lb (89 kg; 14 st 0 lb)
- Position: Centre
- Shot: Left
- Played for: Boston Bruins
- NHL draft: 22nd overall, 1990; Quebec Nordiques
- Playing career: 1993–1997

Ryan Hughes (born January 17, 1972) is a Canadian former professional ice hockey player. Hughes played three games in the National Hockey League (NHL) for the Boston Bruins during the 1995–96 season. His older brother, Kent, is the general manager of the Montreal Canadiens of the NHL.

== Career ==
Hughes played minor hockey with the Lac St-Louis Lions Midget AAA team from 1987 to 1989. In 1988–89, he played three games for the Canadian men's national team. Hughes then played for the Cornell University Big Red from 1989 until 1993. After scoring seven goals and 16 assists for 23 points in 28 games in his first season with Cornell, he was selected in the second round, 22nd overall by the Quebec Nordiques in the 1990 NHL entry draft. In 1992, Hughes played for Canada in the World Junior Championship, scoring one assist in seven games.

After completing college, Hughes made his professional debut with the Cornwall Aces of the American Hockey League (AHL) in the 1993–94 season. After two seasons with Cornwall, Hughes signed as a free agent with the Boston Bruins. He played most of the season with their AHL team, the Providence Bruins, and earned a call-up to Boston. He played three games with Boston, without recording a point. Hughes played one further season in professional ice hockey, with the Quebec Rafales and Chicago Wolves of the International Hockey League.

== Career statistics ==
=== Regular season and playoffs ===
			Regular season					Playoffs
Season	Team	League	GP	G	A	Pts	PIM	GP	G	A	Pts	PIM
1986–87	West Shore Selects	QBAAA	14	14	18	32	—	—	—	—	—	—
1987–88	Lac St-Louis Lions	QMAAA	36	19	32	51	51	2	1	0	1	—
1988–89	Lac St-Louis Lions	QMAAA	42	25	62	87	48	3	1	4	5	6
1988–89	Canadian National Team	Intl	3	0	0	0	2	—	—	—	—	—
1989–90	Cornell University	ECAC	27	7	16	23	35	—	—	—	—	—
1990–91	Cornell University	ECAC	32	18	34	52	28	—	—	—	—	—
1991–92	Cornell University	ECAC	27	13	21	34	36	—	—	—	—	—
1992–93	Cornell University	ECAC	26	8	14	22	30	—	—	—	—	—
1993–94	Cornwall Aces	AHL	54	17	12	29	24	13	2	4	6	6
1994–95	Cornwall Aces	AHL	72	15	24	39	48	14	0	7	7	10
1995–96	Boston Bruins	NHL	3	0	0	0	0	—	—	—	—	—
1995–96	Providence Bruins	AHL	78	22	52	74	89	4	1	2	3	20
1996–97	Chicago Wolves	IHL	14	2	6	8	12	—	—	—	—	—
1996–97	Quebec Rafales	IHL	30	2	3	5	24	8	1	1	2	4
AHL totals			204	54	88	142	161	31	3	13	16	36
NHL totals			3	0	0	0	0	—	—	—	—	—

=== International ===
Year	Team	Event	GP	G	A	Pts	PIM
1992	Canada	WJC	7	0	1	1	0
Junior totals			7	0	1	1	0

== Awards and honors ==
Award	Year
All-ECAC Hockey Rookie Team	1989–90
