= Eric Tulsky =

American ice hockey executive

- Born: June 25, 1974 (age 52); Port Huron, Michigan, U.S.
- Education: Harvard University (BA); University of California, Berkeley (PhD)
- Occupation: General manager
- Years active: 2014–present
- Employer: Carolina Hurricanes (2014–present)
- Title: General manager
- Term: 2024–present
- Scientific career
- Fields: Inorganic chemistry, Solid-state chemistry, Nanotechnology
- Thesis: Dimensional reduction: directed synthesis of metal-anion frameworks and heterometallic clusters (2002)
- Doctoral advisor: Jeffrey R. Long

Eric George Tulsky (born June 25, 1974) is an American ice hockey executive and scientist who is the general manager of the Carolina Hurricanes of the National Hockey League (NHL).

== Education and early career ==
Tulsky has a Bachelor of Arts in chemistry and physics from Harvard University. After completing his PhD in chemistry from the University of California, Berkeley, he worked for two years in postdoctoral study at the Naval Research Laboratory. He then worked in nanotechnology for ten years, including at Silicon Valley companies Life Technologies and QuantumScape. He holds 27 US patents as of 2024.

== Hockey career ==
In 2011, while he was still working in nanotechnology, Tulsky began writing for Philadelphia Flyers fan blog Broad Street Hockey. Through SB Nation, he launched the blog Outnumbered. Tulsky spoke at the 2013 MIT Sloan Sports Analytics Conference about his work with possession metrics, concluding that the dump-and-chase tactic was ineffective and that teams should prioritize controlled zone entries. Although he did not receive any job offers after the conference, teams began to embrace controlled entries in a way that he found "unlikely" to be coincidental.

After publishing his work online, Tulsky began doing various consulting projects for NHL teams. His first consulting project was with the Nashville Predators during the 2012 offseason. For the 2014–15 season, he was hired by the Carolina Hurricanes as a part-time analyst, working as a remote consultant for 20–25 hours per week. He was promoted to a full-time analyst in 2015, moving to Raleigh. He was named head of hockey analytics in 2017, and in 2018 was promoted to vice president of hockey management and strategy. In January 2021, Tulsky was promoted to assistant general manager.

While Tulsky has remained with the Hurricanes, he was interviewed for the position of general manager by the Chicago Blackhawks in 2022 and the Pittsburgh Penguins in 2023. On May 24, 2024, Tulsky was named interim general manager of the Hurricanes after the resignation of Don Waddell, who had spent six years in the role. In his first move in the position, he re-signed forward prospect Ryan Suzuki to a one-year, league-minimum contract extension. On June 18, the Hurricanes announced that Tulsky had been officially hired as permanent general manager.

== Personal life ==
Tulsky was born in Port Huron, Michigan. He moved to Philadelphia at age four, becoming a fan of the Phillies and the Flyers. As a child, he was primarily a baseball fan.

Sporting positions
| Preceded by Don Waddell | General Manager of the Carolina Hurricanes; 2024–present | Incumbent |
