= Kent Hughes (ice hockey) =

Canadian hockey player and manager

- Born: January 21, 1970 (age 56); Montreal, Quebec, Canada
- Spouse: Deena Ghazal
- Children: 3
- Family: Ryan Hughes (brother)

Kent Hughes (born January 21, 1970) is a Canadian former ice hockey player and sports agent, currently serving as general manager of the Montreal Canadiens of the National Hockey League (NHL).

== Early life and career ==
A Montreal native, Hughes grew up in the West Island (Pierrefonds and Beaconsfield) and played minor hockey for the West Island Royals and later the Lac St-Louis Lions. In 1987–88, he joined the Cégep de Saint-Laurent Patriotes, helping his team capture the league championship. Hughes then attended Middlebury College, where he served as team captain for the 1991-92 season.

After earning a Juris Doctor degree from Boston College, Hughes became a player agent in 1998, when he began to represent first overall pick Vincent Lecavalier. In 2016, his agency MFIVE SPORT merged with Quartexx, and became one of the biggest agencies in the National Hockey League (NHL), overseeing more than 290 million dollars' worth of contracts. Collectively, Hughes represented a multitude of NHL players, including: Patrice Bergeron, Kris Letang, Darnell Nurse, Sammy Blais, Alex Newhook, Colin White, Drake Batherson, Anthony Beauvillier, Marco Scandella, and Alexis Lafrenière.

== Executive career ==
Hughes first became acquainted with hockey executive Jeff Gorton when both lived in Boston, with the latter working for the Boston Bruins. Gorton first attempted to recruit Hughes to work with him while he was general manager of the New York Rangers, but he declined. Gorton was later hired by Geoff Molson to be executive vice president of hockey operations for the Montreal Canadiens, after having sacked general manager Marc Bergevin after the team had a historically disastrous start to the 2021–22 NHL season, and began a search for a replacement. Hughes was persuaded to interview for the job, which he considered a "dream" position. His hiring as the eighteenth general manager in team history was announced on January 18, 2022. Molson would subsequently characterize Hughes' hiring as the beginning of a team "rebuild", a process that the franchise had heretofore avoided in its modern history.

While it was initially announced that coach Dominique Ducharme would be retained for the remainder of the season, Hughes removed Ducharme and replaced him with retired star forward Martin St. Louis after the team had lost seven consecutive games at the beginning of 2022, most by blowout margins. Despite having no prior professional coaching experience, St. Louis was immediately well-received. Beginning a plan to revamp the team's roster, Hughes executed a series of trades in his first two months, parting with players such as: Tyler Toffoli, Ben Chiarot, Brett Kulak and Artturi Lehkonen to secure additional draft picks and prospects. Following the season's end, Hughes announced the creation of the Canadiens' first in-house analytics department; led by the Montreal Canadiens first director of hockey analytics Christopher Boucher.

Hughes' first draft as general manager was consequential in that Montreal was both the host and held the first overall pick for the first time since 1980. The Canadiens would draft Slovak winger Juraj Slafkovský first overall, departing from the longstanding consensus that had favoured Canadian centre Shane Wright as the topmost selection. His second-round pick, American defenseman Lane Hutson, was also seen as somewhat of a gamble due to his small stature (5 ft 8 in (1.73 m) and 150 lb (68 kg) at the time of the draft). Both Slafkovský and Hutson would soon become key players on the new-look Habs, with Hutson claiming the 2025 Calder Memorial Trophy as the NHL's best rookie. On the day of the draft, Hughes also executed a series of trades to acquire former third overall pick Kirby Dach from the Chicago Blackhawks. In the same off-season, Hughes fulfilled a trade request from defenceman Jeff Petry by trading him to the Pittsburgh Penguins in exchange for Mike Matheson, a former client of his. The trade was generally considered a success for the Canadiens after its first year.

In Hughes' first full year as general manager, the Canadiens finished fifth-last in the league. In advance of the 2023 NHL entry draft, Hughes traded the thirty-first overall selection that he acquired in the Chiarot trade the year prior to the Colorado Avalanche in exchange for Alex Newhook, another of his former clients, who was subsequently signed to an extension. With their own first round selection being fifth overall, the team opted to take Austrian EHC Kloten defenceman David Reinbacher over Russian SKA Saint Petersburg forward Matvei Michkov. This choice proved controversial, given the latter's projected scoring talent and the Canadiens' lack of offensive depth.

Improvements were swift in Hughes' third year as general manager; the Canadiens had a 15-point improvement in the standings, claiming the last playoff spot in the Eastern Conference in the final week of the season, and while losing the eventual playoff series in five games to Washington confidence in the team's direction was exemplified by Hutson's aforementioned Calder Trophy win. 2025–26 was even stronger as the Habs broke the 100-point barrier to finish third in a competitive Atlantic Division and advanced to the Eastern Conference finals. Cole Caufield became the first Canadiens player in 36 years to score 50 goals in a season, Nick Suzuki won the Frank J. Selke Trophy as the best defensive forward, Caufield took home the Lady Byng Memorial Trophy for the league's best and fairest player and was also named a second team All-Star, and forward Ivan Demidov (Hughes' 1st round selection in the 2024 NHL entry draft) and goalie Jakub Dobeš were named to the All-Rookie Team.

== Personal life ==
Hughes' brother Ryan was a second round pick of the Quebec Nordiques in the 1990 NHL entry draft. Hughes' eldest son Riley was a seventh-round pick of the New York Rangers in the 2018 NHL entry draft. His youngest son Jack played collegiately for Northeastern University and Boston University, and was a second-round pick of the Los Angeles Kings in the 2022 NHL entry draft. He also has a daughter, Morgan.

Preceded by Marc Bergevin	General manager of the Montreal Canadiens; 2022–present	Incumbent
