= Rick Dudley =

Canadian ice hockey player and coach

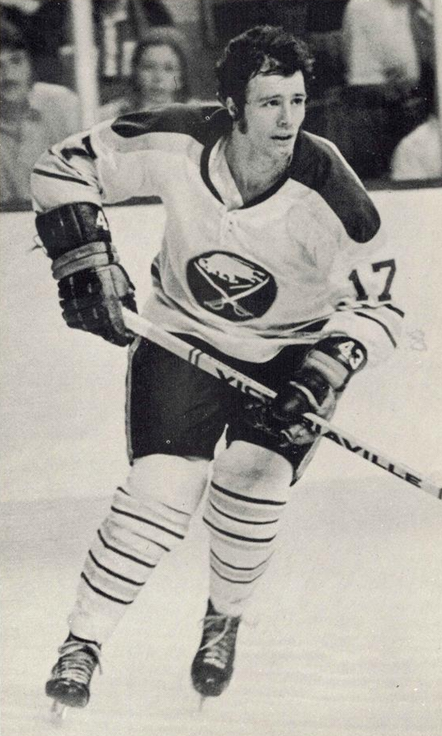
- Born: January 31, 1949 (age 77) Toronto, Ontario, Canada
- Height: 6 ft 0 in (183 cm)
- Weight: 190 lb (86 kg; 13 st 8 lb)
- Position: Left wing
- Shot: Left
- Played for: Buffalo Sabres; Cincinnati Stingers; Winnipeg Jets
- NHL draft: Undrafted
- Playing career: 1972–1981

Richard Clarence Dudley (born January 31, 1949) is a Canadian professional ice hockey executive, former coach and former player. Dudley is presently serving as a senior advisor for the Florida Panthers. Dudley has previously served as an executive with the Tampa Bay Lightning, Chicago Blackhawks, Atlanta Thrashers, Toronto Maple Leafs, Montreal Canadiens and Carolina Hurricanes. Dudley has also served as a head coach in the National Hockey League (NHL), American Hockey League (AHL) and International Hockey League (IHL). Dudley played in the World Hockey Association and in the NHL. Dudley grew up playing hockey in his hometown of Port Credit, Ontario (now Mississauga).

== Playing career ==
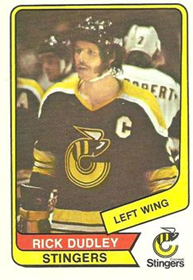
Dudley in 1975 card for Cincinnati Stingers

Born in Toronto, Ontario, Dudley began his playing career with the Buffalo Sabres of the NHL in 1972–73 and played there for three seasons, before switching leagues in 1975–76. He played four seasons in the WHA for the Cincinnati Stingers. On February 4, 1979, Cincinnati traded him to the NHL's Buffalo Sabres, where he remained until the 1980–81 season. During that season, Dudley was released and picked up by the last place Winnipeg Jets on waivers, where he played the remaining 30 games of the season, wearing the number 99. He spent the next season, 1981–82, playing seven games for the Fredericton Express in the American Hockey League.

Dudley was famous for wearing a headband/sweatband when he played.

Dudley is a member of the Cincinnati Hockey Hall of Fame. He also played for the 1974 Rochester Golden Griffins of the National Lacrosse League in the off season, and it was as a professional playing two sports that he was once featured on the television game show, To Tell the Truth. Despite missing a dozen games at the start of the season because the NHL playoffs and at the end of the season because of Buffalo Sabres training camp, he still managed to finish sixth in league scoring.

== Coaching career ==
After retiring as a player, Dudley received a call from Dave Gusky who he knew from his playing days in Cincinnati. Gusky was the owner of a new team in Winston-Salem, North Carolina, the Winston-Salem Thunderbirds, that played in the Atlantic Coast Hockey League. The team was struggling in their first season with a 3–20 record at the time and Gusky was losing money and needed help. Dudley originally planned on staying with the team for a few weeks to evaluate the team but realized if he left the team would fold and he decided not to leave. Dudley proposed that he would stay with the team and try to sell the franchise for Gusky and if that didn’t work he would buy the team himself. At the end of the 1981-82 season, Dudley purchased the team from Gusky for roughly $100,000 and took over the team becoming the owner, GM and coach of the Thunderbirds. Dudley re-branded the team from the Winston-Salem Thunderbirds to the Carolina Thunderbirds and the team began to improve. The Thunderbirds went 196-58-12 in the regular season, winning four consecutive ACHL regular season championships, and led the league in attendance during his time over the team. He coached the team to three ACHL championships and another final appearance in four years. After his time with the Thunderbirds Dudley moved up to become the head coach of the Flint Spirits in the International Hockey League.

He also coached in the IHL and AHL, before finally getting a head-coaching job in the NHL with the Buffalo Sabres in the 1989–90 season. While coaching in the IHL, in 1988, he won the Commissioner's Trophy for the Coach of the Year. He coached the Sabres for three seasons before being fired in 1991–92. He then spent the next four seasons coaching three teams in the IHL, and didn't make an NHL coaching appearance again until he was the mid-season replacement for the Florida Panthers in the 2003–04 season.

== Executive career ==
In the summer of 1998, he was hired as general manager of the Ottawa Senators for the 1998–99 season, after which he was hired by the Tampa Bay Lightning (who traded Rob Zamuner as part of a package for the rights to negotiate with Dudley.) He was released by the Lightning in February 2002 and took over as GM of the Florida Panthers in May of the same year. Two years later, he was let go once more and joined the Blackhawks organization as a hockey consultant before rising to the level of assistant general manager in 2006.

On June 18, 2009, Dudley resigned from the Blackhawks in order to join the Atlanta Thrashers as assistant GM. On April 14, 2010, Dudley was named general manager, replacing Don Waddell, who became club president. Shortly after settling into his new position, when free agency began on July 1, 2010, Dudley aggressively pursued and obtained four players, including Dustin Byfuglien, Andrew Ladd, and an assistant coach, John Torchetti, from the 2010 Stanley Cup champion Chicago Blackhawks. Dudley was dismissed from the team when it moved to Winnipeg in 2011.

Dudley was added to the Toronto Maple Leafs management team as director of player personnel on June 24, 2011. A year later, on May 25, 2012, he was appointed to serve as assistant general manager for the Montreal Canadiens. In the official team press release announcing the move, Canadiens General Manager Marc Bergevin said, "Rick Dudley is a very knowledgeable and proficient hockey executive and we are pleased to welcome him in our organization in the position of assistant general manager.". Prior to the 2014-15 NHL Season, Dudley moved to the position of senior vice president of hockey operations with Montreal.

In May 2018, Dudley joined the Carolina Hurricanes management team as a senior vice president of hockey operations, working once again with Don Waddell. After two seasons with Carolina, Dudley rejoined the Florida Panthers as a senior advisor to the general manager on September 15, 2020. Dudley won his first Stanley Cup with the Panthers in 2024.

== Career statistics ==
=== Regular season and playoffs ===
			Regular season					Playoffs
Season	Team	League	GP	G	A	Pts	PIM	GP	G	A	Pts	PIM
1968–69	Dixie Beehives	OHA-B	—	—	—	—	—	—	—	—	—	—
1968–69	St. Catharines Black Hawks	OHA	26	8	7	15	43	16	2	1	3	46
1969–70	Iowa Stars	CHL	26	3	3	6	36	11	0	3	3	4
1970–71	Cleveland Barons	AHL	16	1	0	1	2	—	—	—	—	—
1970–71	Flint Generals	IHL	15	1	5	6	30	—	—	—	—	—
1971–72	Cincinnati Swords	AHL	51	6	23	29	272	9	0	4	4	58
1972–73	Cincinnati Swords	AHL	64	40	44	84	159	15	7	15	22	56
1972–73	Buffalo Sabres	NHL	6	0	1	1	7	—	—	—	—	—
1973–74	Buffalo Sabres	NHL	67	13	13	26	71	—	—	—	—	—
1974–75	Buffalo Sabres	NHL	78	31	39	70	116	10	3	1	4	26
1975–76	Cincinnati Stingers	WHA	74	43	38	81	156	—	—	—	—	—
1976–77	Cincinnati Stingers	WHA	77	41	47	88	102	4	0	1	1	7
1977–78	Cincinnati Stingers	WHA	72	30	41	71	156	—	—	—	—	—
1978–79	Cincinnati Stingers	WHA	47	17	20	37	102	—	—	—	—	—
1978–79	Buffalo Sabres	NHL	24	5	6	11	2	3	1	1	2	2
1979–80	Buffalo Sabres	NHL	66	11	22	33	58	—	—	—	—	—
1980–81	Buffalo Sabres	NHL	38	10	13	23	10	—	—	—	—	—
1980–81	Winnipeg Jets	NHL	30	5	5	10	28	—	—	—	—	—
1981–82	Fredericton Express	AHL	7	1	3	4	30	—	—	—	—	—
WHA totals			270	131	146	277	516	4	0	1	1	7
NHL totals			309	75	99	174	292	25	7	2	9	69

== Coaching record ==
Team	Year	Regular season							Postseason			
Team	Year	G	W	L	T	OTL	Pts	Finish	W	L	Win %	Result
BUF	1989–90	80	45	27	8	–	98	2nd in Adams	2	4	.333	Lost in first round
BUF	1990–91	80	31	30	19	–	81	3rd in Adams	2	4	.333	Lost in first round
BUF	1991–92	28	9	15	4	–	22	3rd in Adams	–	–	–	(fired)
FLA	2003–04	40	13	15	9	3	38	4th in Southeast	–	–	–	(returned to assistant coaching role)
Total		228	98	87	40	3			4	8	.333	

Preceded by Robbie Ftorek	Head coach of the New Haven Nighthawks; 1988–89	Succeeded by Marcel Comeau
Preceded by Ted Sator	Head coach of the Buffalo Sabres; 1989–91	Succeeded by John Muckler
Preceded by Don Waddell	Head coach of the San Diego Gulls; 1992–93	Succeeded by Harold Snepsts
Preceded by Tim Bothwell	Head coach of the Phoenix Roadrunners; 1994	Succeeded by Rob Laird
Preceded by None	Head coach of the Detroit Vipers; 1994–96	Succeeded by Steve Ludzik
Preceded by Pierre Gauthier	General Manager of the Ottawa Senators; 1998–1999	Succeeded by Marshall Johnston
Preceded by Jacques Demers	General Manager of the Tampa Bay Lightning; 1999–2002	Succeeded by Jay Feaster
Preceded by Chuck Fletcher	General Manager of the Florida Panthers; 2002–04	Succeeded by Mike Keenan
Preceded by Mike Keenan	Head coach of the Florida Panthers; 2003–04	Succeeded by John Torchetti
Preceded by Don Waddell	General Manager of the Atlanta Thrashers; 2010–11	Succeeded by Kevin Cheveldayoff (Winnipeg Jets)
