= Don Waddell =

American ice hockey player and manager (born 1958)

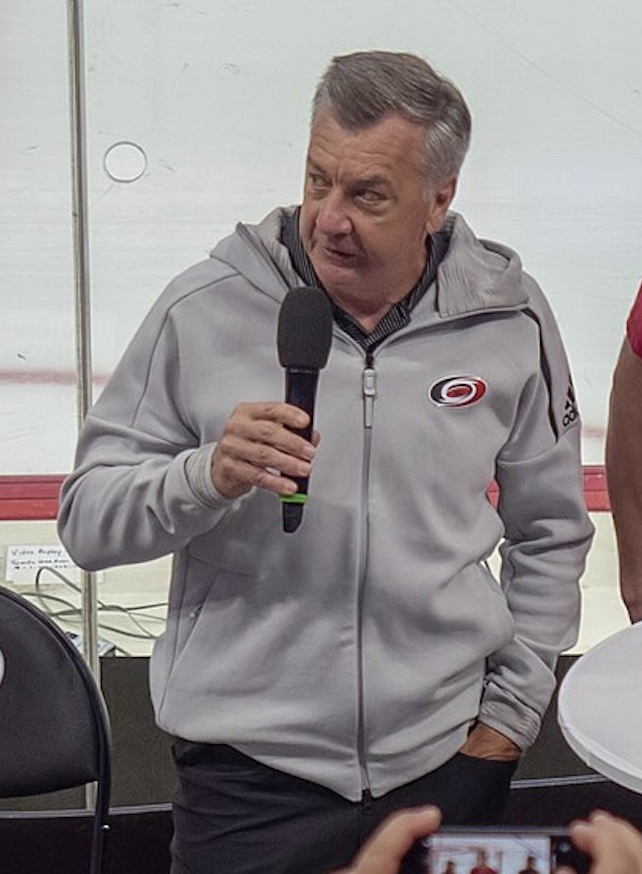
- Waddell in 2018.
- Born: August 19, 1958 (age 68) Detroit, Michigan, U.S.
- Height: 5 ft 10 in (178 cm)
- Weight: 180 lb (82 kg; 12 st 12 lb)
- Position: Defense
- Shot: Left
- Played for: Augsburger EV; Los Angeles Kings
- National team: United States
- NHL draft: 111th overall, 1978; Los Angeles Kings
- Playing career: 1980–1988

Donald Douglas Waddell (born August 19, 1958) is an American professional ice hockey executive and former player who is currently the president of hockey operations and general manager for the Columbus Blue Jackets. He previously held similar leadership roles with the Carolina Hurricanes and Atlanta Thrashers.

== Playing career ==
Waddell was selected 111th overall, in the 1978 NHL Amateur Draft. He was selected as the 3rd choice of the Los Angeles Kings on June 15, 1978. He played in the NHL for only one game with the Kings during the 1980–81 season, against the New York Rangers on January 28, 1981.

His playing career consisted mostly of minor and college hockey. He played 4 seasons at Northern Michigan University. He was one of the final cuts for the 1980 U.S. men's hockey team after he broke his leg in a pre-tournament game. He won the International Hockey League's (IHL) Governor's Trophy in 1982 for best defenseman during the regular season.

During the 1984–85 IHL season, he was traded from the Flint Generals with Jim Aldred, to the Toledo Goaldiggers in exchange for Bill Joyce and Mark Plantery.

== Coaching career ==
After his tenure as a player, he moved to coaching for the 1987–88 season with the IHL Flint Spirits as a player-coach. For the next two seasons, he moved behind the bench permanently. Waddell moved on to the IHL San Diego Gulls for the 1991–92 season. Waddell took over as interim coach of the Atlanta Thrashers during the 2002–03 season with a record of 4–5–1–0 as coach before Bob Hartley was named to the permanent job.

After a disappointing start (0–6–0) to the 2007–08 Atlanta Thrashers season, Waddell was named interim head coach of the team following the dismissal of Bob Hartley. For several months, he was able to lead the team on a turn around, but the Thrashers ultimately played poorly down the stretch and missed the playoffs.

=== Coaching record ===
Team	Year	Regular season							Postseason
Team	Year	G	W	L	T	OTL	Pts	Finish	Result
Atlanta Thrashers	2002–03	10	4	5	1	0	9	3rd in Southeast	Missed playoffs
Atlanta Thrashers	2007–08	76	34	34	—	8	72	4th in Southeast	Missed playoffs
Total		86	38	39	1	8			

== Management career ==
=== Early career ===
Waddell's first front office experience came with the International Hockey League's Flint Spirits during the 1988–89 season when he served in the dual role of head coach and general manager. He moved into Flint's front office exclusively for the 1989–90 season before joining the IHL's San Diego Gulls. He was vice president and general manager for the Gulls from 1990 to 1995 before accepting the same role with the IHL's Orlando Solar Bears. While in Orlando, Waddell was also vice president of RDV Sports and served on the organization's executive committee which oversaw the NBA's Orlando Magic, the Solar Bears and RDV Sports' retail and aviation interests.

=== Detroit Red Wings ===
After leaving Orlando, Waddell served as assistant general manager of the Detroit Red Wings in the 1997–98 season, capturing the Stanley Cup.

=== Atlanta Thrashers ===
On June 23, 1998, just one week after the Red Wings swept the Washington Capitals in the 1998 Stanley Cup Final, Waddell was named the first general manager of the Atlanta Thrashers. He served as general manager of the Thrashers until the conclusion of the 2009–10 season when he was promoted to team president, and Rick Dudley succeeded him as general manager. During his tenure as general manager of the Thrashers, the team recorded a 308–401–45–66 record and made their lone playoff appearance after winning the NHL's Southeast Division in 2006–07. Waddell also served as executive vice president and co-chair of the executive committee for the Thrashers' parent company, Atlanta Spirit.

Following True North's purchase of the Thrashers, Waddell announced he would not be moving with the team from Atlanta to Winnipeg.

=== Pittsburgh Penguins ===
On January 21, 2012, the Pittsburgh Penguins announced their hiring of Waddell as a professional scout.

=== Carolina Hurricanes ===
Waddell left the Penguins organization on July 1, 2014, to become the president of Gale Force Sports & Entertainment, the parent company of the NHL's Carolina Hurricanes. On May 8, 2018, Waddell was named president and general manager of the Hurricanes. On May 24, 2024, Waddell resigned as president and GM of the Hurricanes, being replaced by assistant GM Eric Tulsky on an interim basis.

=== Columbus Blue Jackets ===
On May 28, 2024, Waddell was named president of hockey operations, general manager and alternate governor of the Columbus Blue Jackets.

== Career statistics ==
=== Regular season and playoffs ===
			Regular season					Playoffs
Season	Team	League	GP	G	A	Pts	PIM	GP	G	A	Pts	PIM
1975–76	Detroit Little Caesars	GLJHL	50	23	29	52	—	—	—	—	—	—
1976–77	Northern Michigan University	CCHA	28	11	34	45	40	—	—	—	—	—
1977–78	Northern Michigan University	CCHA	32	18	34	52	44	—	—	—	—	—
1978–79	Northern Michigan University	CCHA	23	5	20	25	24	—	—	—	—	—
1979–80	Northern Michigan University	CCHA	37	18	32	50	30	—	—	—	—	—
1980–81	Los Angeles Kings	NHL	1	0	0	0	0	—	—	—	—	—
1980–81	Houston Apollos	CHL	31	4	5	9	23	—	—	—	—	—
1980–81	Saginaw Gears	IHL	40	4	18	22	33	13	2	4	6	6
1981–82	Saginaw Gears	IHL	77	26	69	95	61	14	1	17	18	0
1982–83	Saginaw Gears	IHL	18	3	17	20	10	—	—	—	—	—
1982–83	New Haven Nighthawks	AHL	—	—	—	—	—	2	0	0	0	0
1983–84	Augsburger EV	1.GBun	8	6	5	11	10	—	—	—	—	—
1984–85	Flint Generals	IHL	35	3	14	17	10	—	—	—	—	—
1984–85	Toledo Goaldiggers	IHL	42	10	31	41	12	6	0	6	6	0
1985–86	Toledo Goaldiggers	IHL	63	19	50	69	113	—	—	—	—	—
1985–86	New Haven Nighthawks	AHL	6	1	4	5	9	5	1	2	3	4
1986–87	Flint Spirits	IHL	10	1	4	5	2	6	1	3	4	4
1987–88	New Haven Nighthawks	AHL	2	1	2	3	0	—	—	—	—	—
1987–88	Flint Spirits	IHL	71	17	58	75	61	15	5	10	15	6
NHL totals			1	0	0	0	0	—	—	—	—	—
IHL totals			356	83	261	344	302	54	9	40	49	16

=== International ===
Year	Team	Event	GP	G	A	Pts	PIM
1978	United States	WJC	6	5	2	7	8

== Awards and honors ==
Award	Year
All-CCHA First Team	1977–78; 1979–80
IHL Governor's Trophy	1981-82

== See also ==
- List of players who played only one game in the NHL

Awards and achievements
Preceded by Mike Liut	CCHA Player of the Year; 1978; Shared with John Markell	Succeeded by Ken Morrow
Sporting positions
Preceded by Winnipeg Jets general managers John Paddock	General manager of the Atlanta Thrashers; 1999–2010	Succeeded by Rick Dudley
Preceded by Curt Fraser; Bob Hartley	Head coach of the Atlanta Thrashers; 2002–2003 (interim); 2007–2008 (interim)	Succeeded by Bob Hartley; John Anderson
Preceded by Ron Francis	General manager of the Carolina Hurricanes; 2018–2024	Succeeded by Eric Tulsky (interim)
Preceded by John Davidson (Interim)	General Manager of the Columbus Blue Jackets; 2024–present	Incumbent
