= List of current NHL general managers =

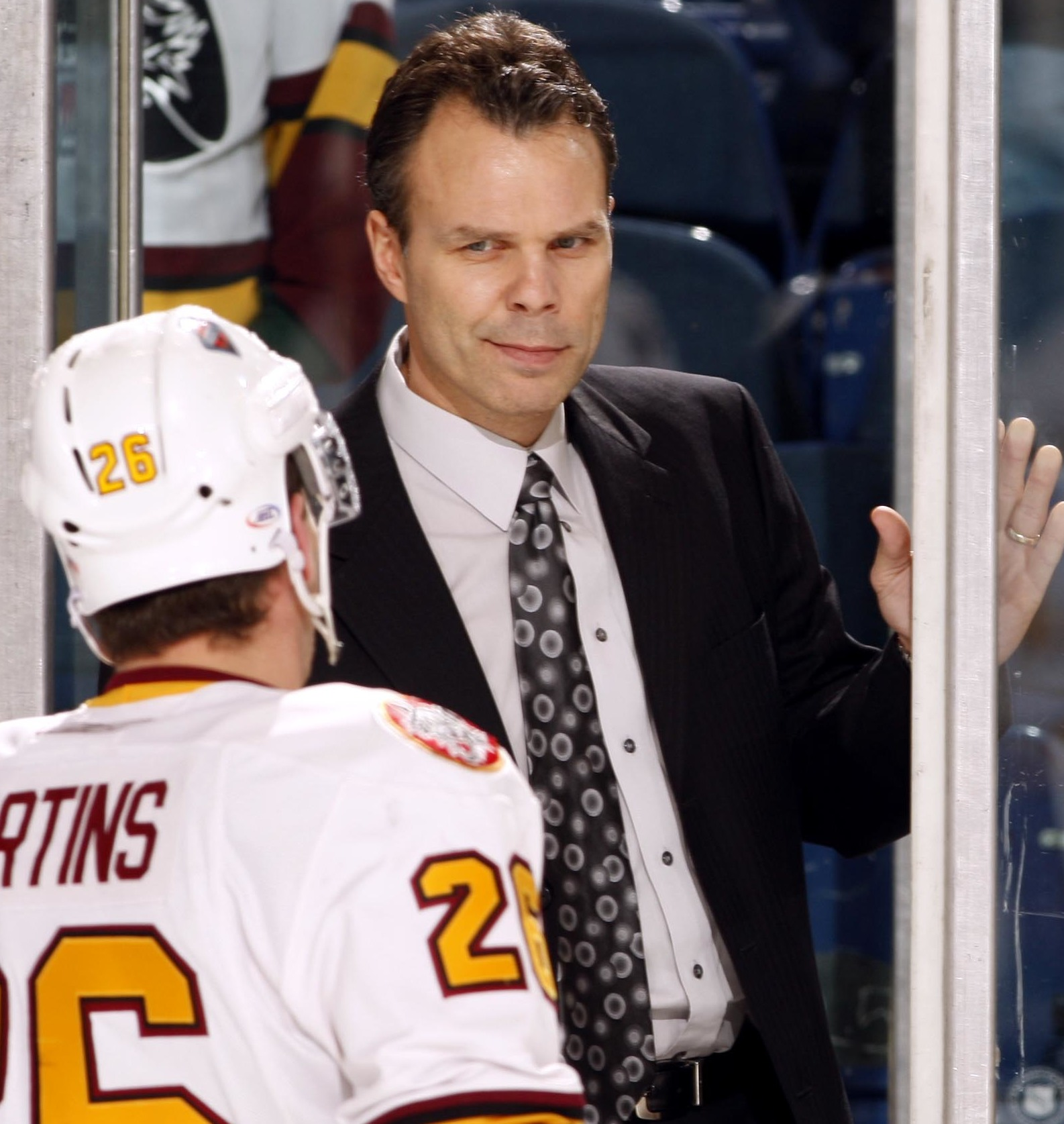
Kevin Cheveldayoff has been the general manager of the Winnipeg Jets since 2011, and is currently the longest tenured general manager in the National Hockey League.

This is a list of current general managers in the National Hockey League. In the National Hockey League, the general manager of a team typically controls player transactions and bears the primary responsibility on behalf of the hockey club during contract discussions with players.

The general manager is also normally the person who hires, fires, and supervises the head and assistant coaches for both the NHL team and often the club's American Hockey League (AHL) affiliate, amateur and professional scouts, and all other hockey operations staff.

== Current NHL general managers ==
Team	General manager	Tenured since	Pro career	References
Anaheim Ducks	Pat Verbeek	February 3, 2022	1982–2002	
Boston Bruins	Don Sweeney	May 20, 2015	1988–2004	
Buffalo Sabres	Jarmo Kekäläinen	December 15, 2025	1985–1995	
Calgary Flames	Craig Conroy	May 23, 2023	1995–2011	
Carolina Hurricanes	Eric Tulsky	May 24, 2024	None	
Chicago Blackhawks	Kyle Davidson	October 26, 2021	None	
Colorado Avalanche	Joe Sakic	June 2, 2026	1988–2009	
Columbus Blue Jackets	Don Waddell	May 28, 2024	1980–1988	
Dallas Stars	Jim Nill	April 29, 2013	1980–1991	
Detroit Red Wings	Shawn Horcoff (interim)	September 15, 2026	2000–2016	
Edmonton Oilers	Stan Bowman	July 24, 2024	None	
Florida Panthers	Bill Zito	September 2, 2020	None	
Los Angeles Kings	Ken Holland	May 14, 2025	None	
Minnesota Wild	Bill Guerin	August 21, 2019	1991–2010	
Montreal Canadiens	Kent Hughes	January 18, 2022	None	
Nashville Predators	Chris MacFarland	June 2, 2026	None	
New Jersey Devils	Sunny Mehta	April 16, 2026	None	
New York Islanders	Mathieu Darche	May 23, 2025	2000–2012	
New York Rangers	Chris Drury	May 5, 2021	1998–2011	
Ottawa Senators	Steve Staios	November 1, 2023	1993–2012	
Philadelphia Flyers	Daniel Briere	March 10, 2023	1997–2015	
Pittsburgh Penguins	Kyle Dubas	August 3, 2023	None	
San Jose Sharks	Mike Grier	July 5, 2022	1996-2011	
Seattle Kraken	Jason Botterill	April 22, 2025	1997–2004	
St. Louis Blues	Alexander Steen	June 30, 2026	2001–2020	
Tampa Bay Lightning	Julien BriseBois	September 11, 2018	None	
Toronto Maple Leafs	John Chayka	May 3, 2026	None	
Utah Mammoth	Bill Armstrong	April 18, 2024 (Note: Armstrong was originally hired as general manager of the Arizona Coyotes on September 17, 2020; he retained his role as general manager upon the transfer of Arizona's hockey assets to Utah in 2024.)	1990–1999	
Vancouver Canucks	Ryan Johnson	May 14, 2026	1996–2011	
Vegas Golden Knights	Kelly McCrimmon	September 1, 2019	None	
Washington Capitals	Chris Patrick	July 8, 2024	None	
Winnipeg Jets	Kevin Cheveldayoff	June 8, 2011	1990–1994	

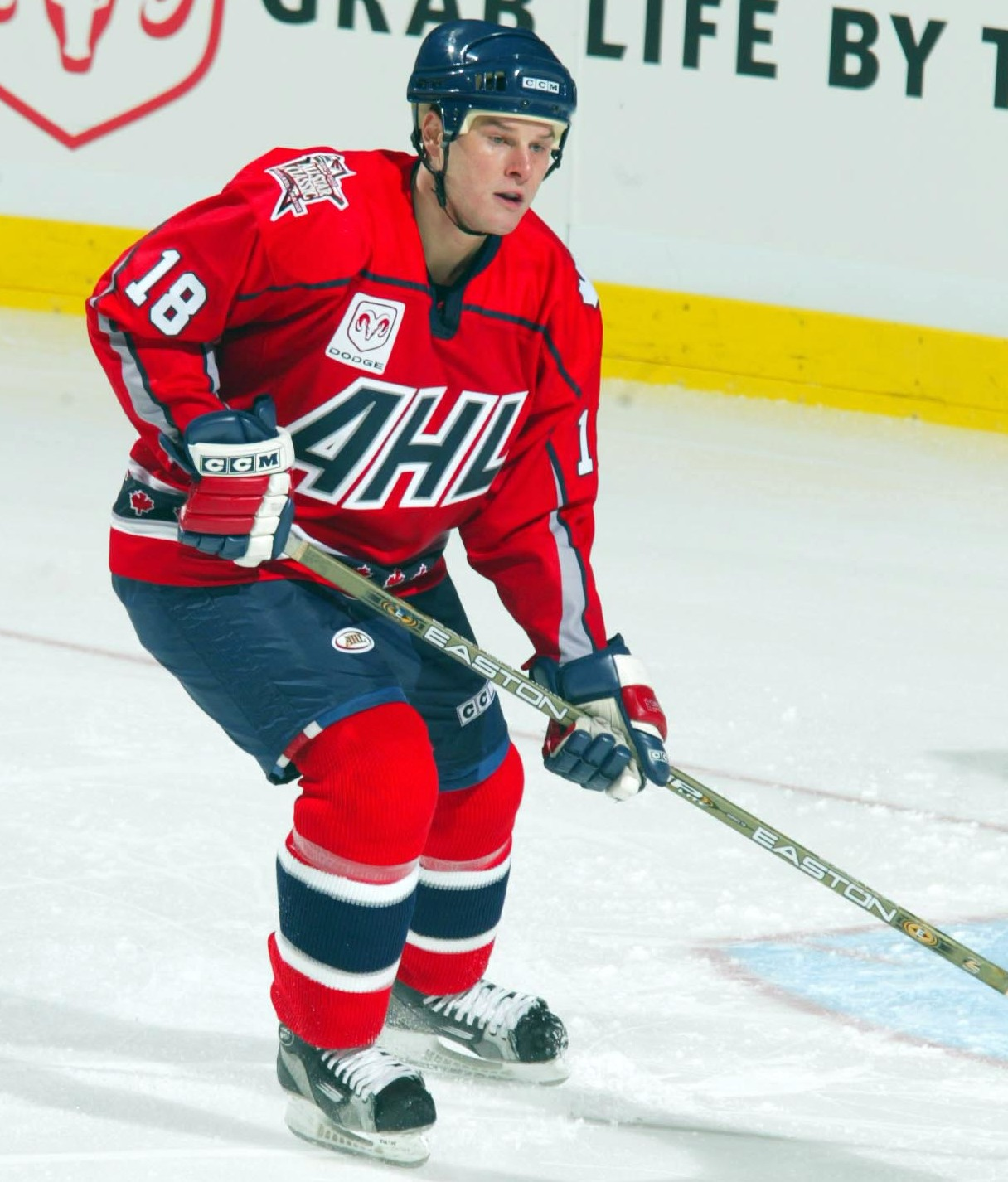
Jason Botterill, Seattle Kraken

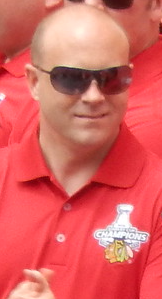
Stan Bowman, Edmonton Oilers

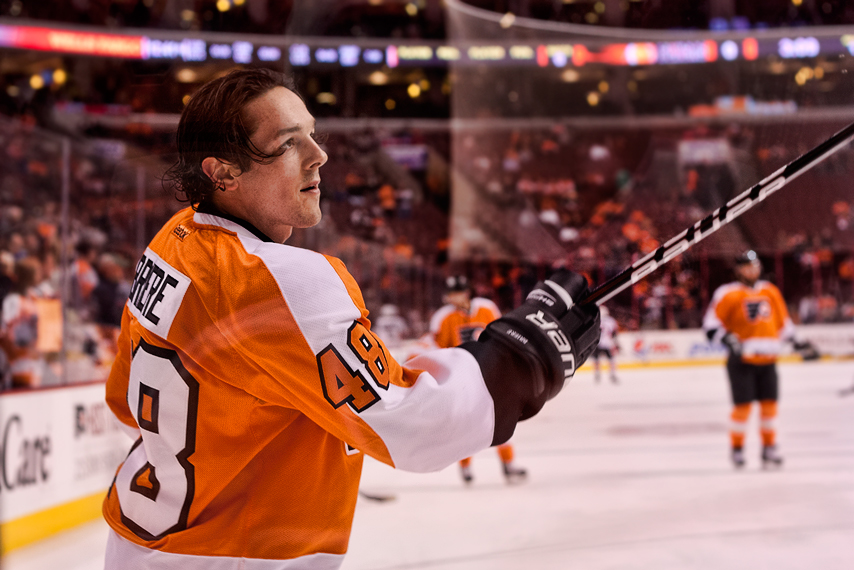
Daniel Briere, Philadelphia Flyers

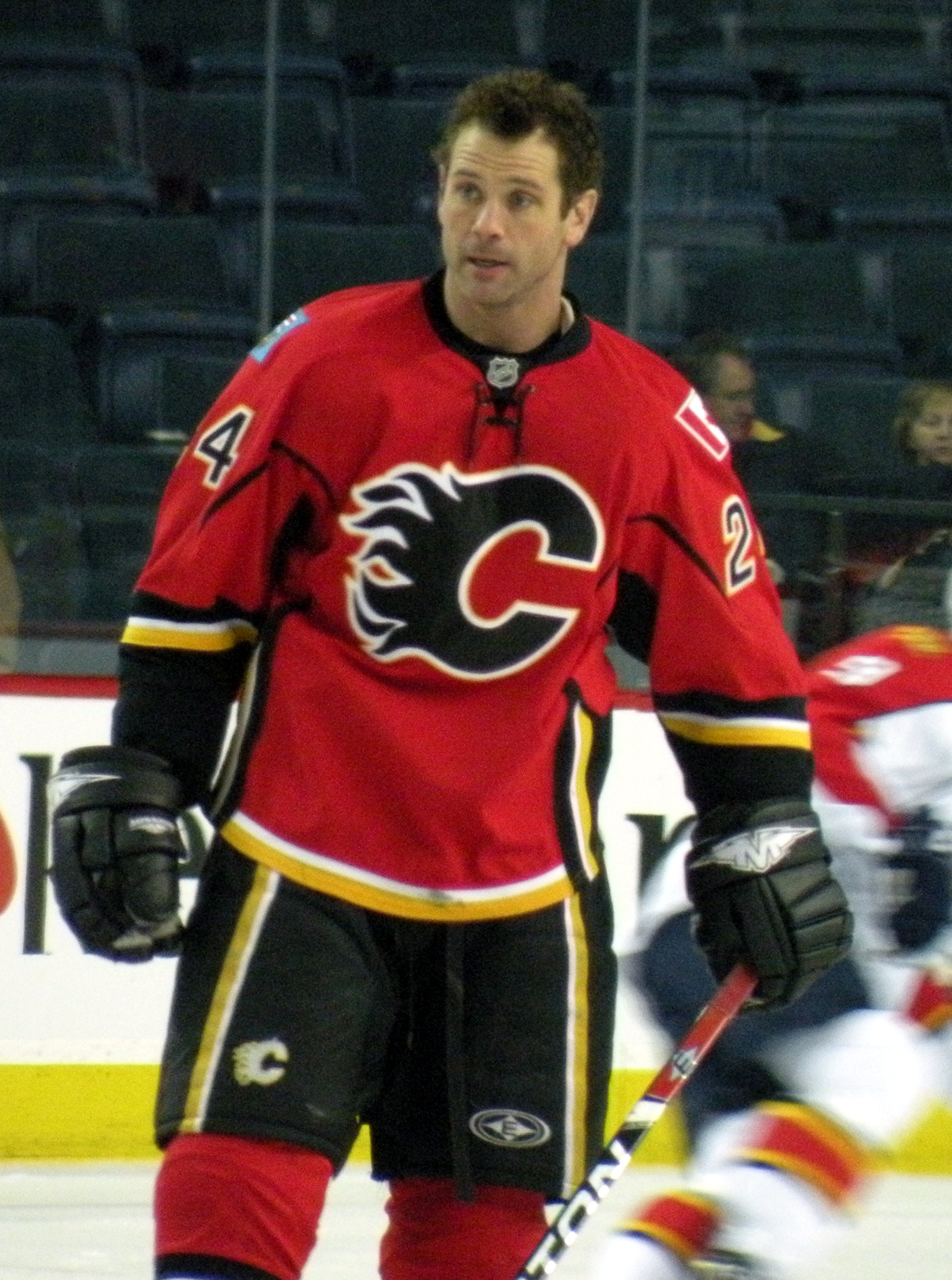
Craig Conroy, Calgary Flames

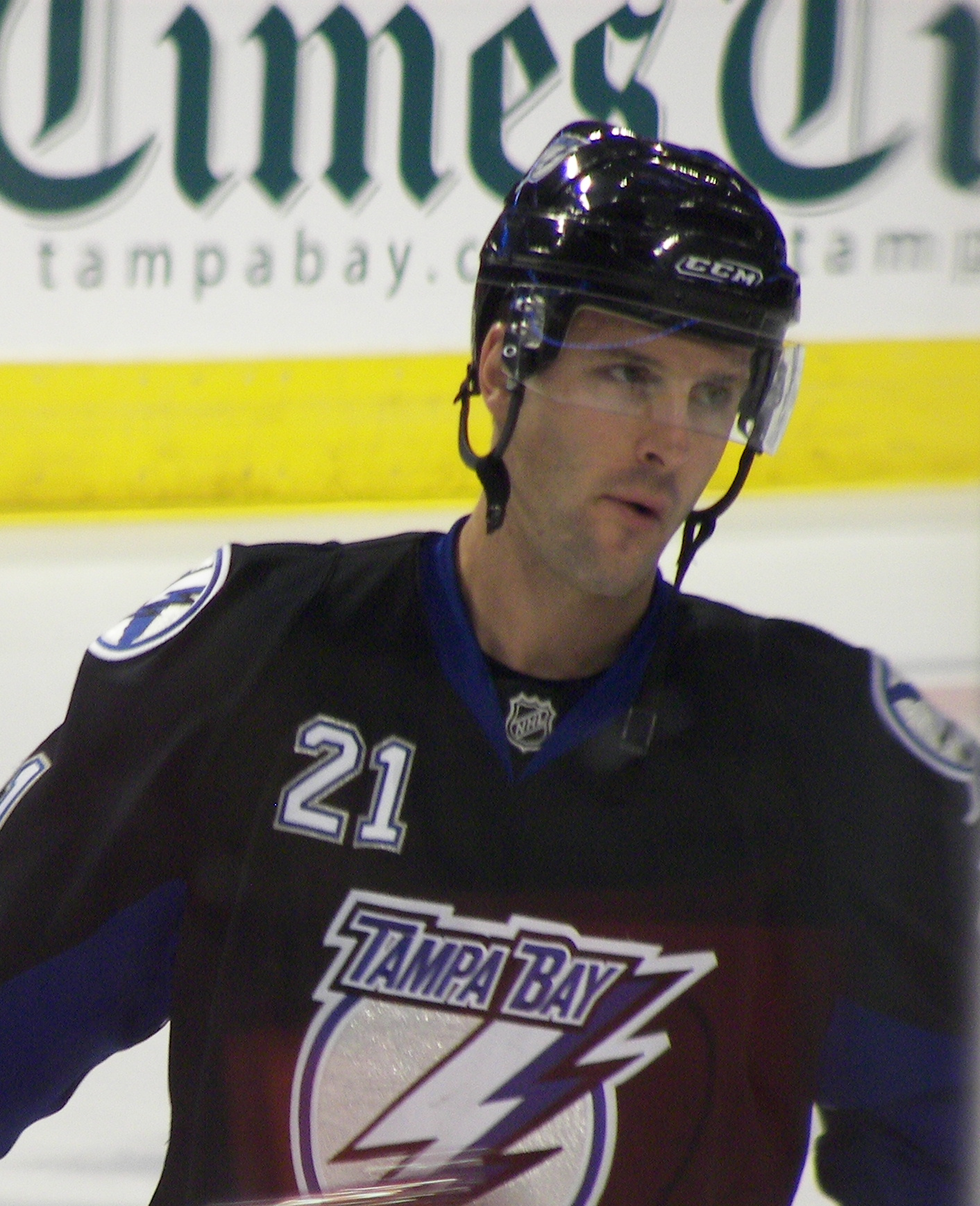
Mathieu Darche, New York Islanders

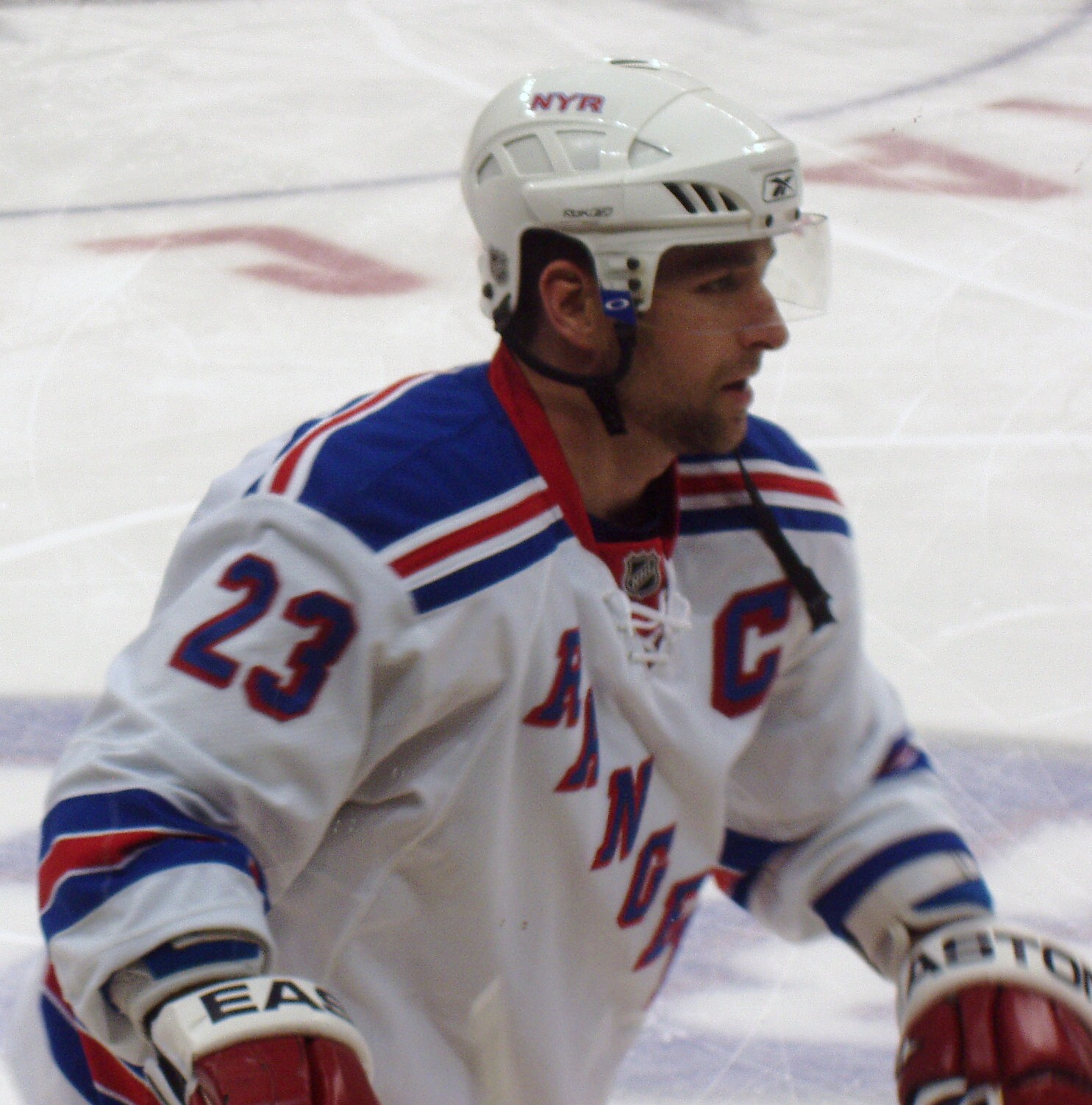
Chris Drury, New York Rangers

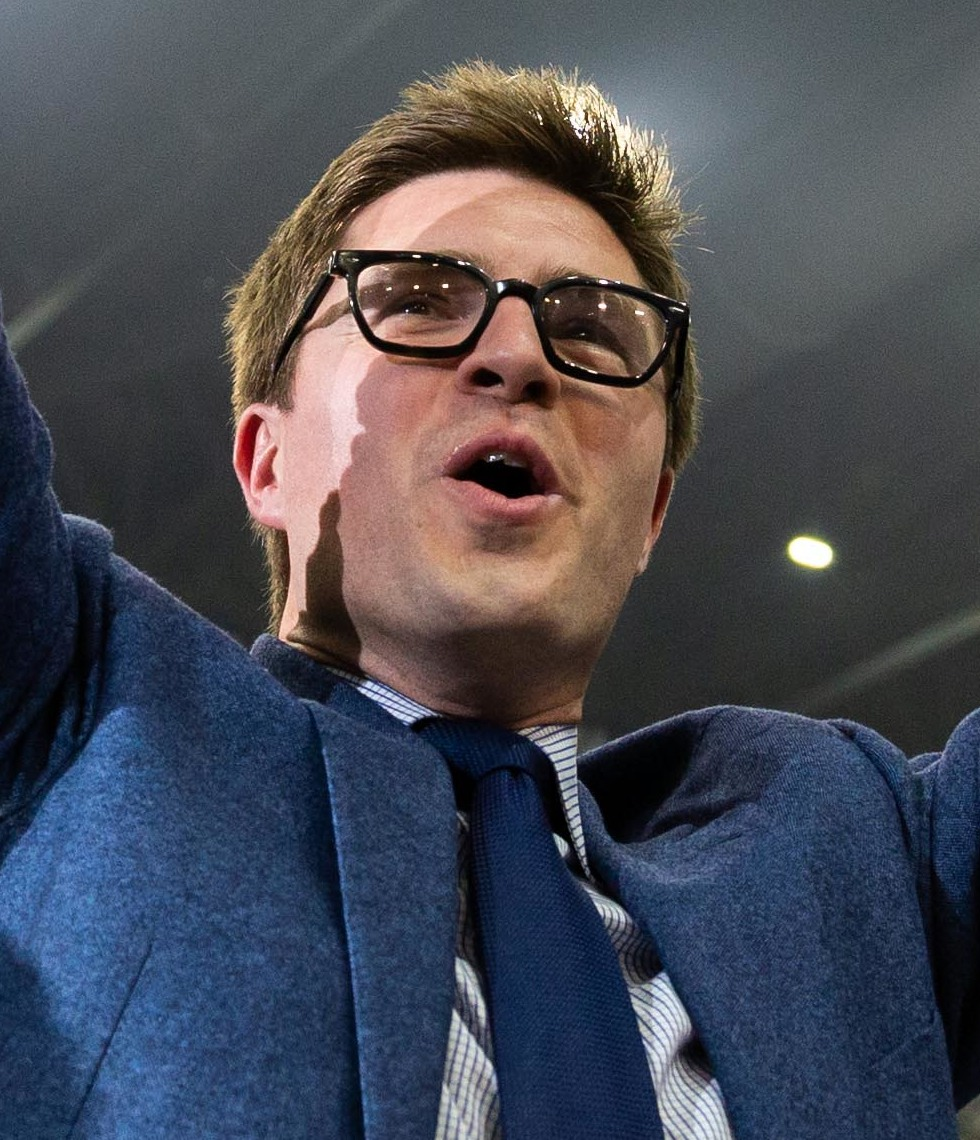
Kyle Dubas, Pittsburgh Penguins

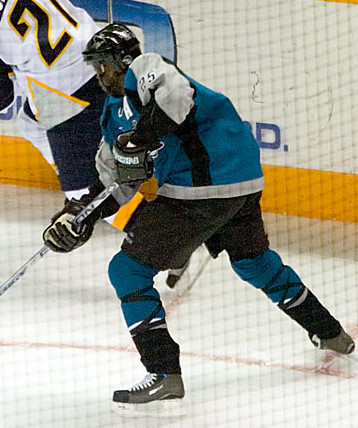
Mike Grier, San Jose Sharks

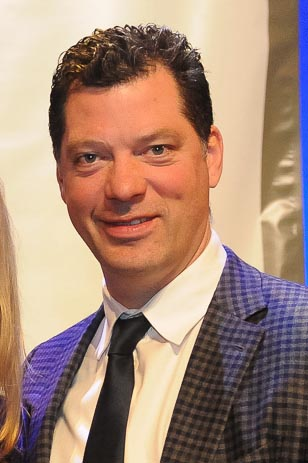
Bill Guerin, Minnesota Wild

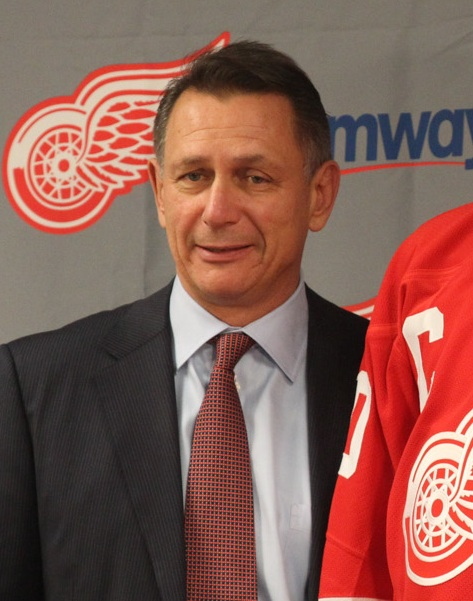
Ken Holland, Los Angeles Kings

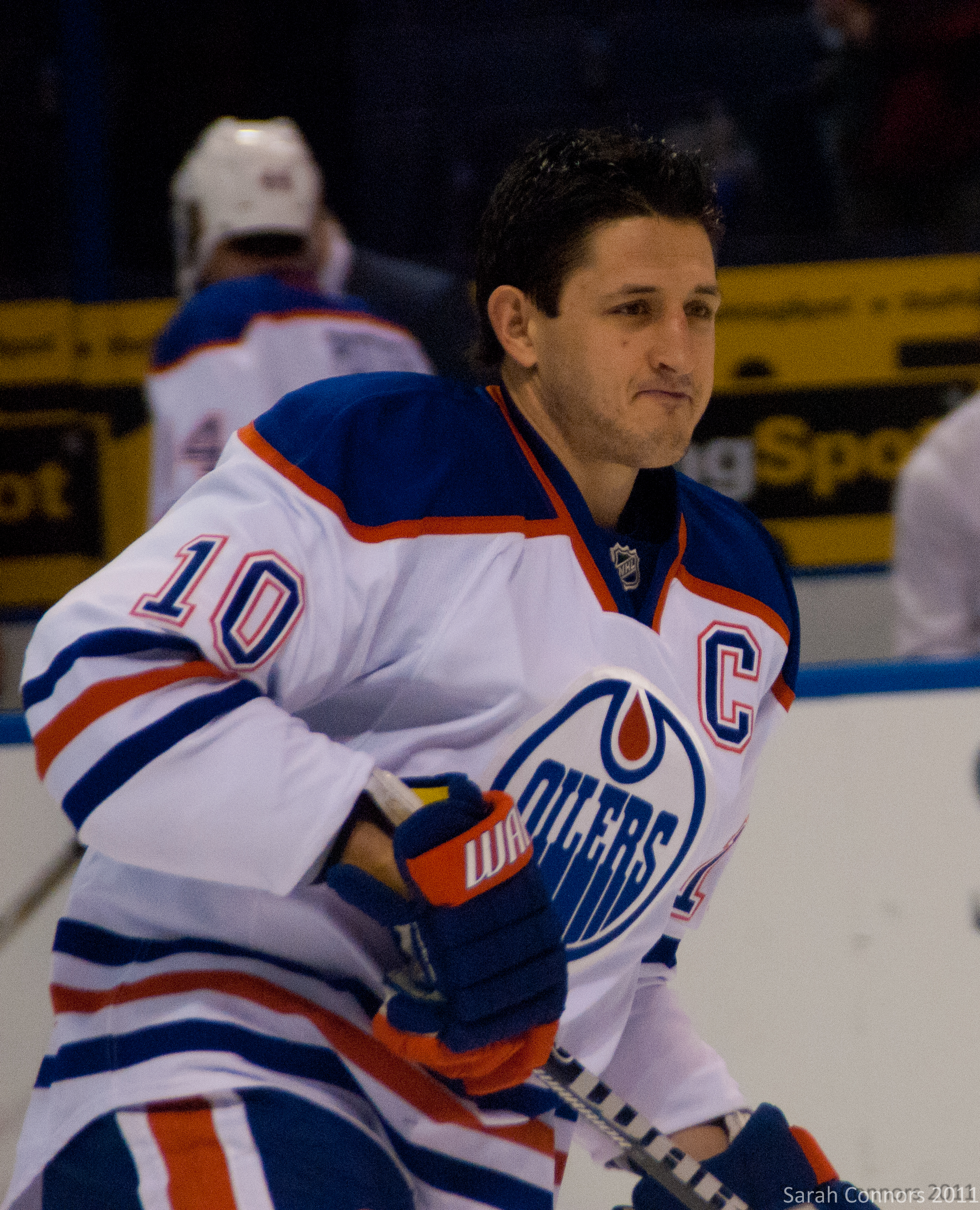
Shawn Horcoff, Detroit Red Wings

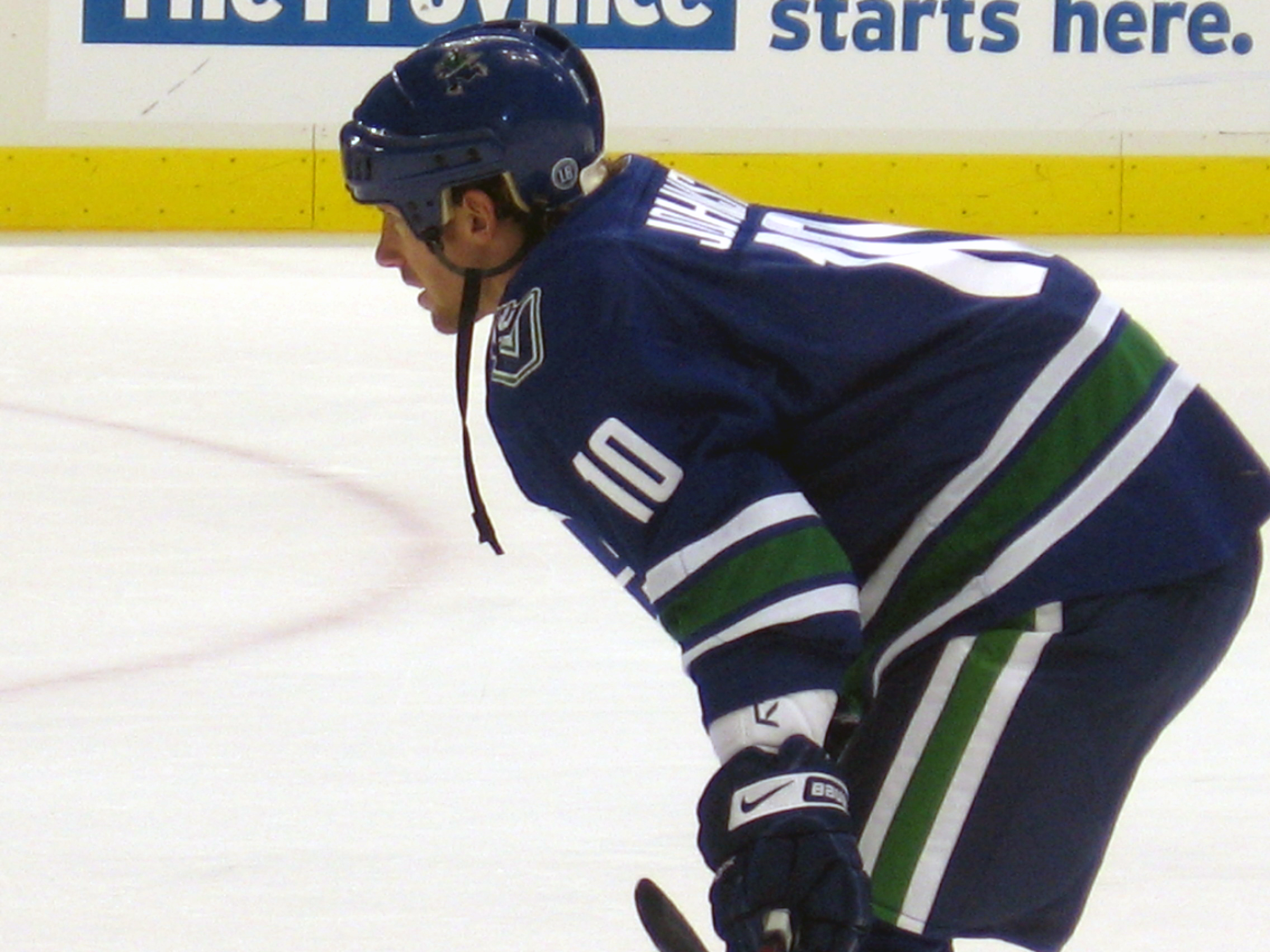
Ryan Johnson, Vancouver Canucks

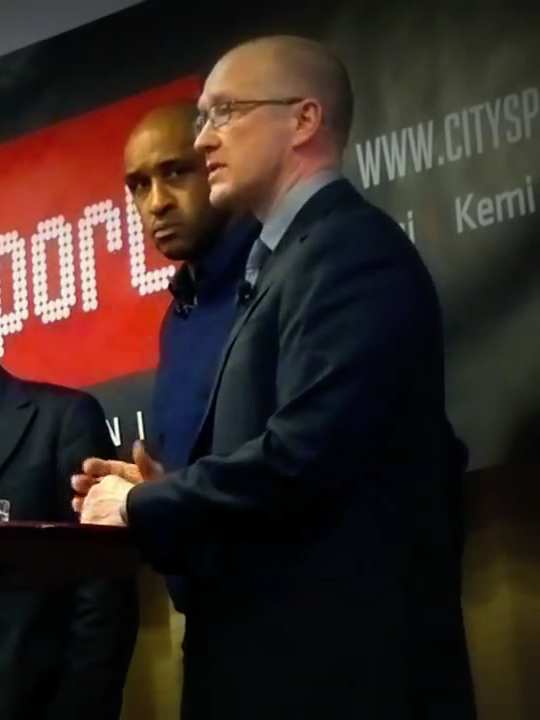
Jarmo Kekäläinen, Buffalo Sabres

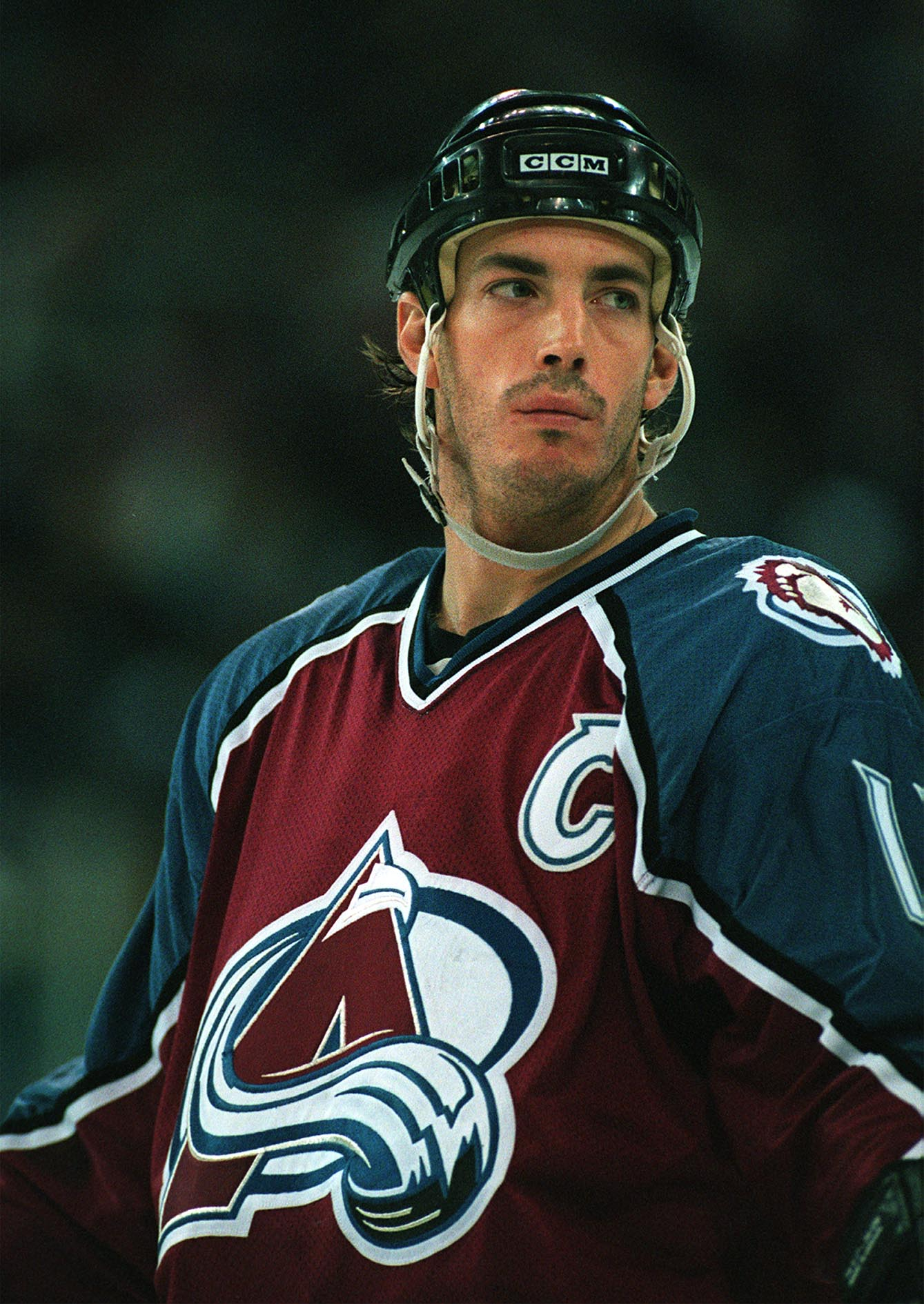
Joe Sakic, Colorado Avalanche

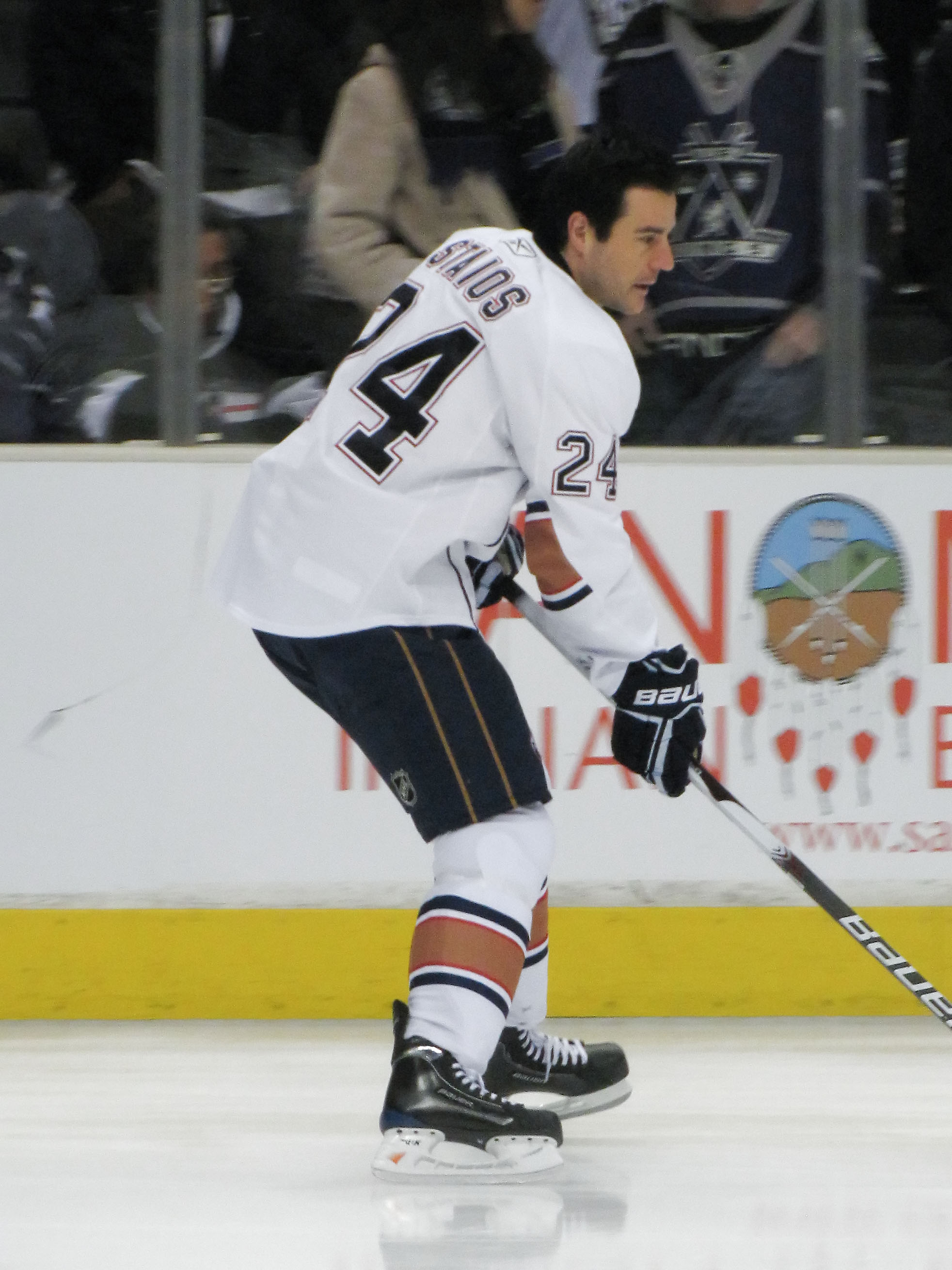
Steve Staios, Ottawa Senators

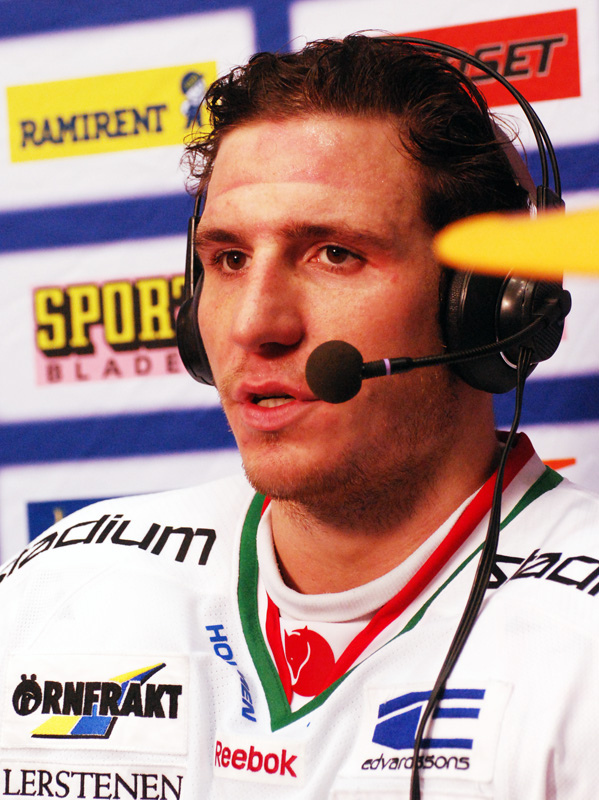
Alexander Steen, St. Louis Blues

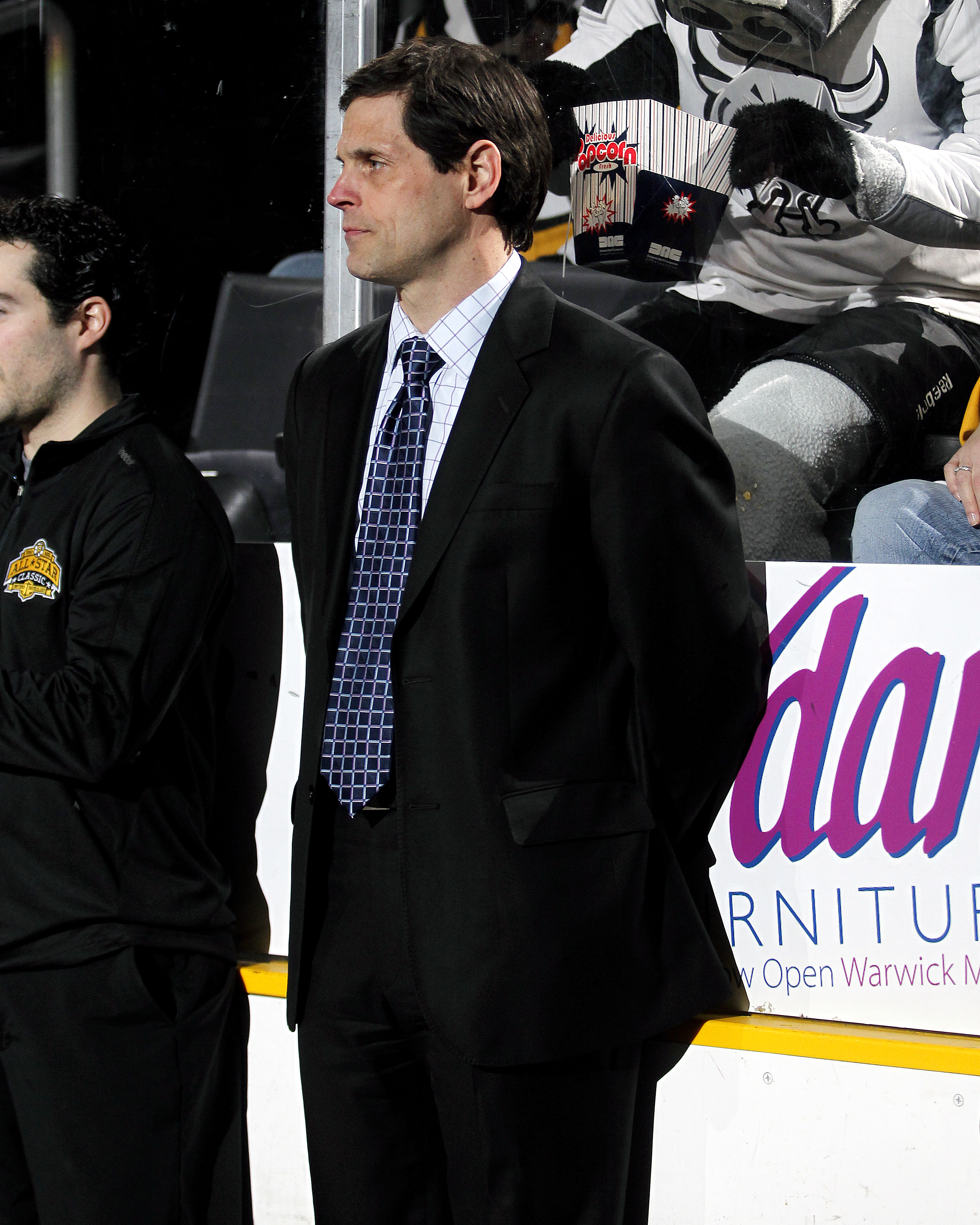
Don Sweeney, Boston Bruins

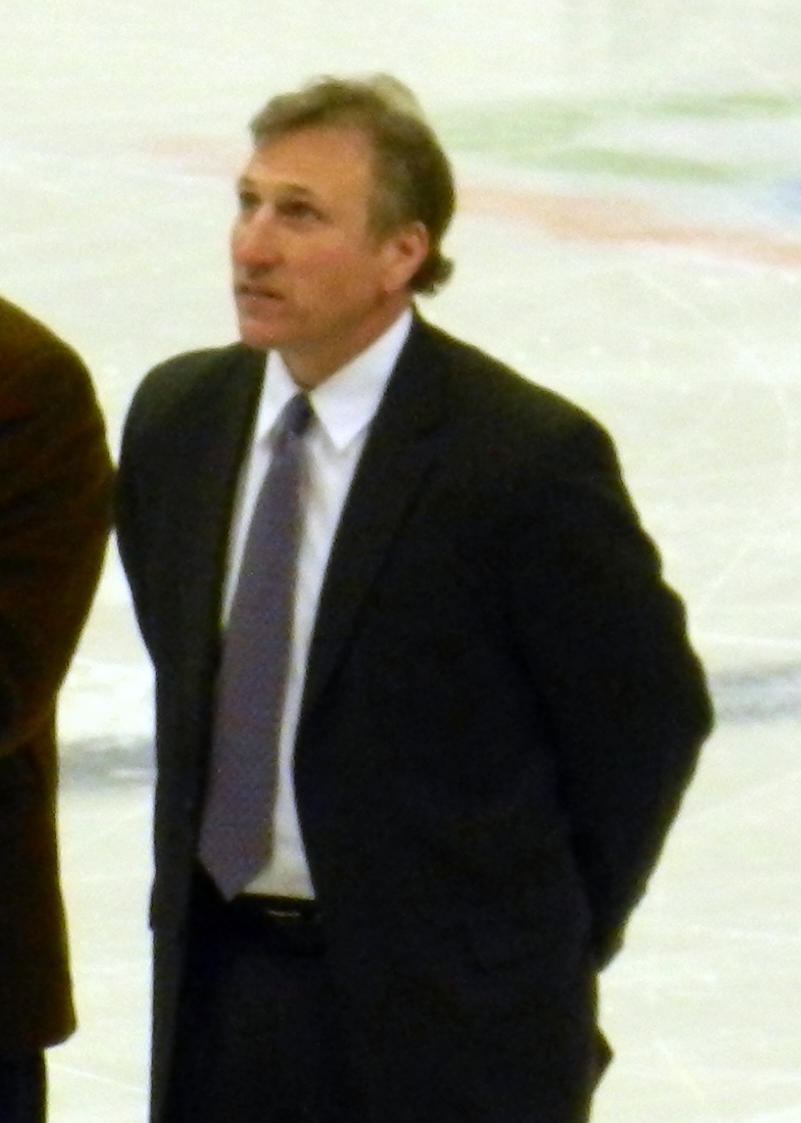
Pat Verbeek, Anaheim Ducks

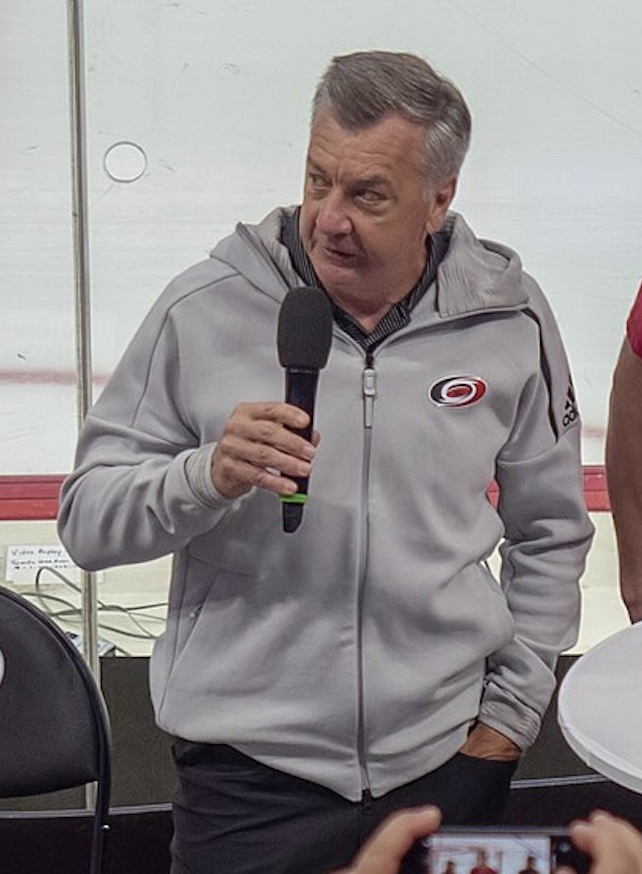
Don Waddell, Columbus Blue Jackets

== See also ==
- NHL General Manager of the Year Award
- List of NHL head coaches
