= Kevin Cheveldayoff =

Canadian ice hockey player (born 1970)

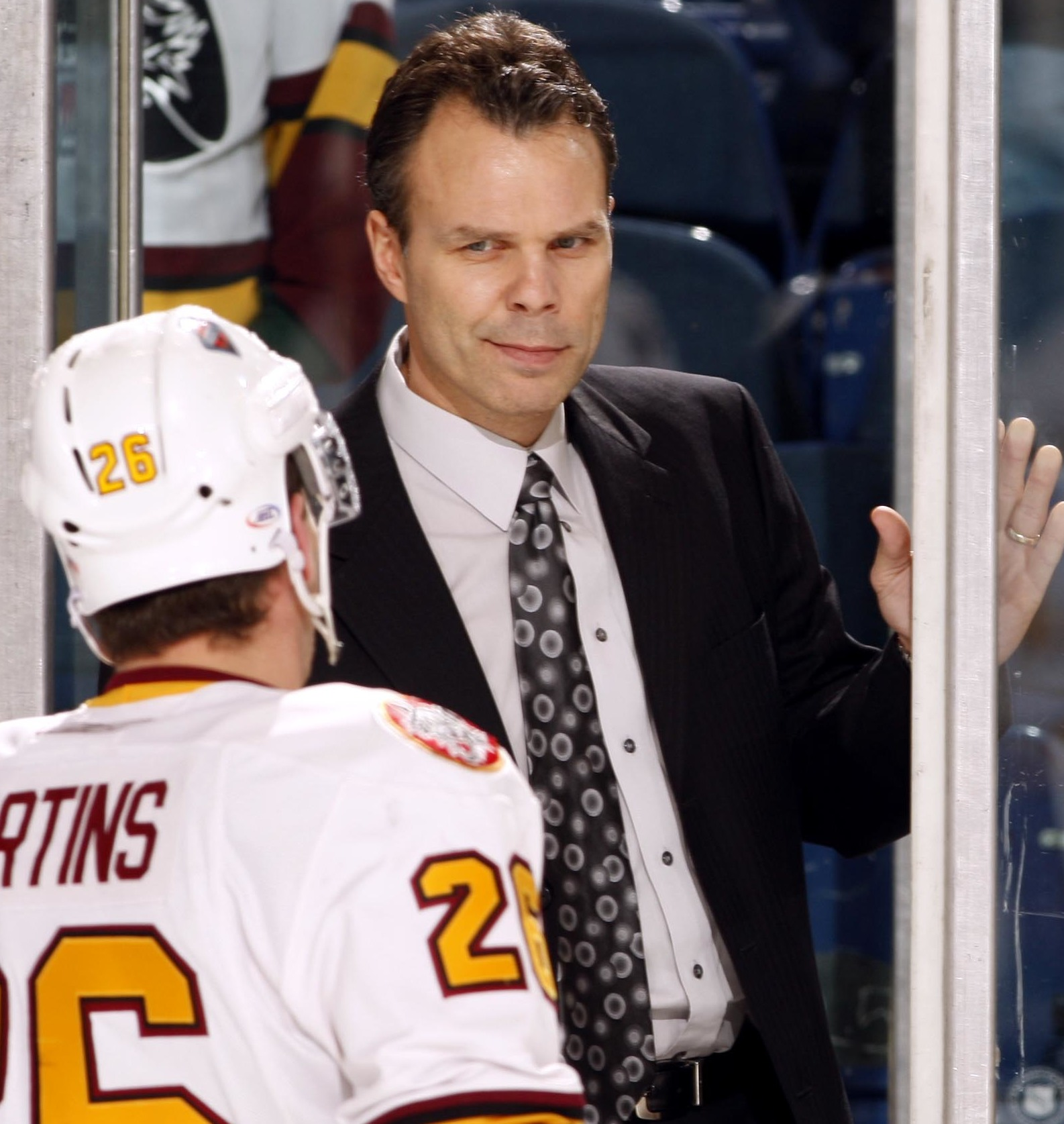
- Cheveldayoff in 2007
- Born: February 4, 1970 (age 56) Saskatoon, Saskatchewan, Canada
- Height: 6 ft 2 in (188 cm)
- Weight: 202 lb (92 kg; 14 st 6 lb)
- Position: Defence
- Shot: Right
- Played for: Springfield Indians; Capital District Islanders; Salt Lake Golden Eagles
- NHL draft: 16th overall, 1988; New York Islanders
- Playing career: 1990–1994

Kevin A. Cheveldayoff (born February 4, 1970), nicknamed "Chevy", is a Canadian ice hockey executive and former player who is currently the executive vice president and general manager of the Winnipeg Jets of the National Hockey League.

== Playing career ==
Cheveldayoff played his junior hockey with the Brandon Wheat Kings of the Western Hockey League. He was drafted in the first round, 16th overall, by the New York Islanders in the 1988 NHL entry draft. He played five seasons in the minor leagues, most notably with the Capital District Islanders of the American Hockey League, having had his career cut short by a knee injury. He never played a game in the NHL.

== Front office ==
=== Minor leagues ===
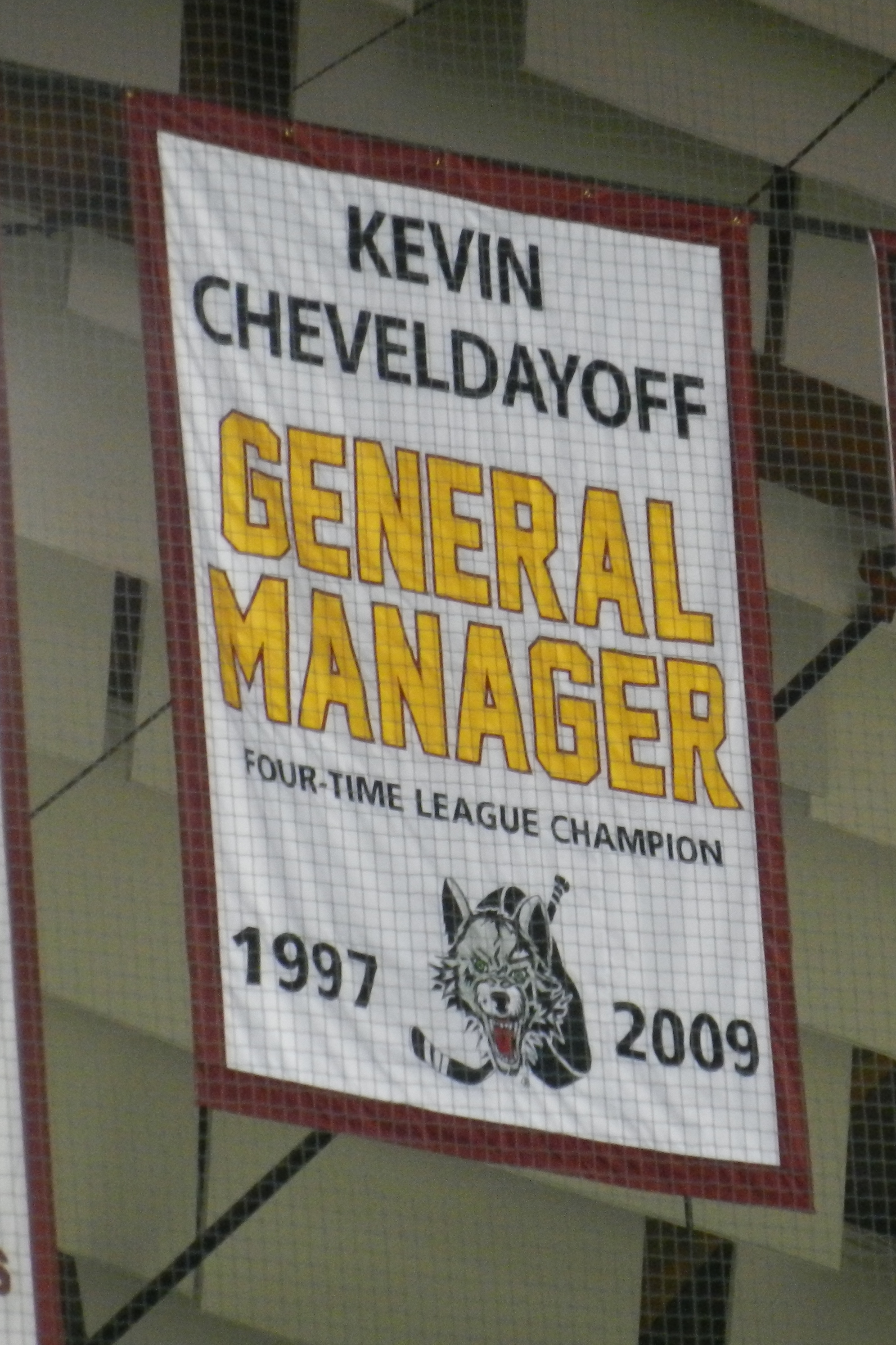
The Chicago Wolves banner honoring Cheveldayoff

After his playing career, Cheveldayoff joined the Denver Grizzlies of the International Hockey League for three seasons as an assistant to head coach Butch Goring. In his first two seasons with the Grizzlies (1994-95 in Denver; 1995-96 in Utah), the team won the Turner Cup as IHL champions.

Cheveldayoff left the Grizzlies in 1997 to become the general manager of the Chicago Wolves, also of the IHL. The Wolves won two Turner Cups under Cheveldayoff. After the demise of the IHL in 2001, the Wolves were absorbed into the American Hockey League and, in their first season, won the Calder Cup as AHL champions. They won a second AHL championship in 2007-08.

=== National Hockey League ===
The Chicago Blackhawks hired Cheveldayoff as their assistant general manager for the 2009-2010 season, working under general manager Stan Bowman. In his first season with the Hawks, the team won the Stanley Cup, defeating the Philadelphia Flyers in six games. Cheveldayoff spent two seasons with the Hawks.

On June 8, 2011, Cheveldayoff was unveiled as the new general manager of the new Winnipeg Jets, replacing Rick Dudley. Dudley and most of the Atlanta Thrashers staff were let go after the team was purchased by True North Sports & Entertainment and relocated to Winnipeg. Longtime Manitoba Moose general manager Craig Heisinger, a friend of Cheveldayoff's from their days with the Wheat Kings, was named as his assistant. In addition, Cheveldayoff is also an executive vice-president with True North.

On October 5, 2014, Cheveldayoff traded Eric Tangradi to the Montreal Canadiens in return for Peter Budaj and Patrick Holland. This marked the first NHL "player for player" trade Cheveldayoff had made in his (at the time) 3+ years as Jets' general manager.

On May 16, 2018, Cheveldayoff was named a finalist for the NHL General Manager of the Year Award after he guided the Jets to their best regular season record and to the Western Conference Finals for the first time ever.

On February 25, 2019, Cheveldayoff was named the TSN TradeCentre GM of the Day, for his transactions at the 2019 NHL Trade Deadline.

In May 2021, the Chicago Blackhawks launched an internal investigation after two former players alleged they were sexually assaulted by video coach Brad Aldrich during the 2010 Stanley Cup playoffs. The findings of the investigation were released on October 25, revealing that Cheveldayoff, then an assistant general manager for Chicago, was part of a group of executives within the Blackhawks who knew of the allegations against Aldrich, but failed to file a formal police report. On October 29, Cheveldayoff met with NHL commissioner Gary Bettman, who concluded was Cheveldayoff's involvement in the matter was too limited to justify disciplining him.

On March 9, 2024, Cheveldayoff was again named the TSN TradeCentre GM of the deadline period, for his transactions at the 2024 NHL Trade Deadline.

== Personal ==
Cheveldayoff and his wife Janet have two children.

Cheveldayoff is the younger brother of Saskatchewan politician Ken Cheveldayoff, who was first elected in 2003, and later served as a cabinet minister in the Saskatchewan Party governments of both Brad Wall and Scott Moe.

== Career statistics ==
			Regular season					Playoffs
Season	Team	League	GP	G	A	Pts	PIM	GP	G	A	Pts	PIM
1986–87	Brandon Wheat Kings	WHL	70	0	16	16	259	—	—	—	—	—
1987–88	Brandon Wheat Kings	WHL	71	3	29	32	265	4	0	2	2	20
1988–89	Brandon Wheat Kings	WHL	40	4	12	16	135	—	—	—	—	—
1989–90	Brandon Wheat Kings	WHL	33	5	12	17	56	—	—	—	—	—
1989–90	Springfield Indians	AHL	4	0	0	0	0	—	—	—	—	—
1990–91	Capital District Islanders	AHL	76	0	14	14	203	—	—	—	—	—
1991–92	Capital District Islanders	AHL	44	0	4	4	110	7	0	0	0	22
1992–93	Capital District Islanders	AHL	79	3	8	11	113	4	0	1	1	8
1993–94	Salt Lake Golden Eagles	IHL	73	0	4	4	216	—	—	—	—	—
AHL totals			203	3	26	29	426	11	0	1	1	30

Awards and achievements
Preceded by Dean Chynoweth	New York Islanders first-round draft pick 1988	Succeeded by Dave Chyzowski
Sporting positions
Preceded by Rick Dudley (Atlanta Thrashers)	General Manager of the Winnipeg Jets; 2011–present	Incumbent
