= Ilya Kovalchuk =

Russian ice hockey player (born 1983)

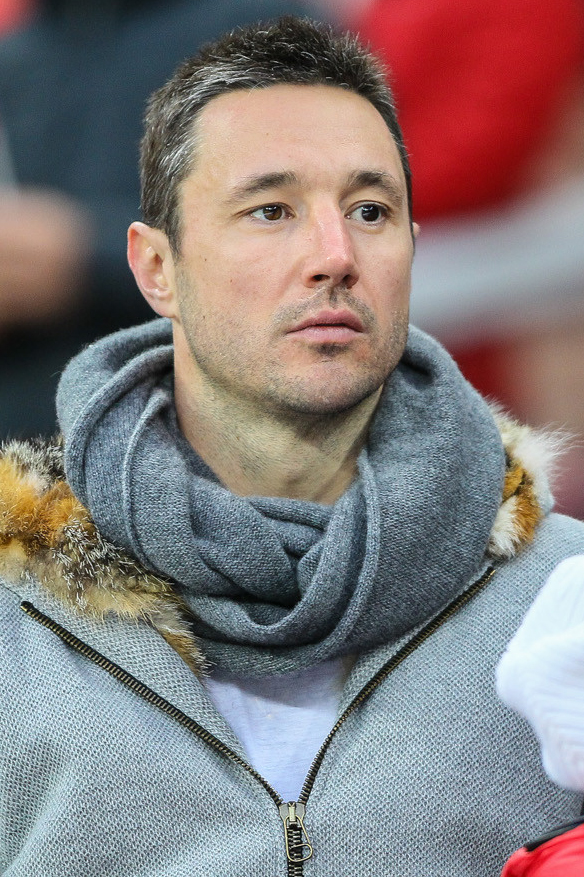
- Kovalchuk in 2017
- Born: 15 April 1983 (age 43) Kalinin, Russian SFSR, Soviet Union
- Height: 6 ft 3 in (191 cm)
- Weight: 227 lb (103 kg; 16 st 3 lb)
- Position: Left wing
- Shot: Right
- Played for: Spartak Moscow; Atlanta Thrashers; Ak Bars Kazan; Khimik Moscow Oblast; New Jersey Devils; SKA Saint Petersburg; Los Angeles Kings; Montreal Canadiens; Washington Capitals; Avangard Omsk
- National team: Russia
- NHL draft: 1st overall, 2001; Atlanta Thrashers
- Playing career: 1999–2024

Ilya Valeryevich Kovalchuk (Russian: Илья Валерьевич Ковальчук; born 15 April 1983) is a Russian former professional ice hockey winger. He played for the Atlanta Thrashers, New Jersey Devils, Los Angeles Kings, Montreal Canadiens, and Washington Capitals in the National Hockey League (NHL), as well as Ak Bars Kazan, Khimik Moscow Oblast, SKA Saint Petersburg, Avangard Omsk, and Spartak Moscow in the Russian Superleague (RSL) and Kontinental Hockey League (KHL).

Kovalchuk developed in the youth system of Spartak Moscow, joining their senior team in the Vysshaya Liga in 1999. After two seasons with Spartak, he joined the Atlanta Thrashers of the NHL, who selected him first overall in the 2001 NHL entry draft. After eight seasons with the Thrashers, he was traded to the New Jersey Devils in 2010, with which he signed a 15-year, $100 million contract, after a 17-year, $102 million deal was blocked by the NHL. In 2013, he left the NHL to return to Russia, joining SKA Saint Petersburg, where he played for five seasons before returning to the NHL in 2018. Kovalchuk returned to the KHL for the 2020–21 season, before taking two years off from hockey and ultimately returning to Spartak.

Kovalchuk is tied for fourth all time in the NHL for regular-season overtime goals scored (15) and 18th in goals-per-game average (.511), and is the seventh-highest scoring Russian in NHL history. In the NHL, Kovalchuk has twice been named to the All-Star team, and in 2004 finished in a three-way tie for the Maurice "Rocket" Richard Trophy as the NHL's leading goal-scorer, sharing it with Jarome Iginla and Rick Nash.

Internationally, Kovalchuk has played for the Russian national junior team in the World U18 Championship and World Junior Championship, and for the Russian national senior team in the World Championship, World Cup and Winter Olympics, winning the 2008 and 2009 World Championships. At his fifth Olympics in 2018, Kovalchuk was named the most valuable player while helping Olympic Athletes from Russia win the gold medal.

== Playing career ==
=== Early life ===
Kovalchuk was born in Kalinin (now Tver), a city roughly 180 kilometres northwest of Moscow, the second child and first son of Valeri and Lyubov. Born big, he was named in honour of Ilya Muromets, a legendary figure from Kievan Rus'. Kovalchuk's father, Valeri, played basketball in Tver; after his career ended, he turned to coaching and was the head of the sport's school at the Spartak Olympic reserve in the city from 1980 until 1998, while Lyubov was the head of the #2 polyclinic of the #7 Tver city hospital. Valeri would later write a book detailing Kovalchuk's development as a hockey player, titled "From Tver to Atlanta" (Russian: «От Твери до Атланты») and published in 2004; he died in 2005 due to heart disease. Kovalchuk's sister, Arina, is seven years older than him. At age seven, Kovalchuk was invited to join the Spartak Moscow youth school, which he went to every weekend, taking the train with his father.

=== Spartak Moscow ===
As a youth, Kovalchuk played in the 1997 Quebec International Pee-Wee Hockey Tournament with Spartak Moscow. He later played for Vysshaya Liga club Spartak Moscow for two seasons before entering the NHL. Drafted by the Thrashers first overall in the 2001 NHL entry draft, he became the first Russian to be drafted first overall in the NHL's history. In club-level competition, Kovalchuk wore the number 17 as a tribute to Valeri Kharlamov, a Soviet superstar in the 1970s.

=== Atlanta Thrashers (2001–2010) ===
Entering his NHL rookie season in 2001–02, Kovalchuk scored 29 goals and 51 points despite missing 17 games with a season-ending shoulder injury. He finished second in voting to teammate Dany Heatley for the Calder Memorial Trophy as NHL rookie of the year. Both were named to the NHL All-Rookie Team. After improving to 38 goals and 67 points in his second season, Kovalchuk scored 41 goals in 2003–04, making him a co-winner of the Maurice "Rocket" Richard Trophy after tying for the NHL lead in goals with Jarome Iginla of the Calgary Flames and Rick Nash of the Columbus Blue Jackets. He also added 46 assists for 87 points, tying him with Joe Sakic of the Colorado Avalanche for second in the NHL that season, behind Martin St. Louis. Kovalchuk also participated in his first NHL All-Star Game in 2004.

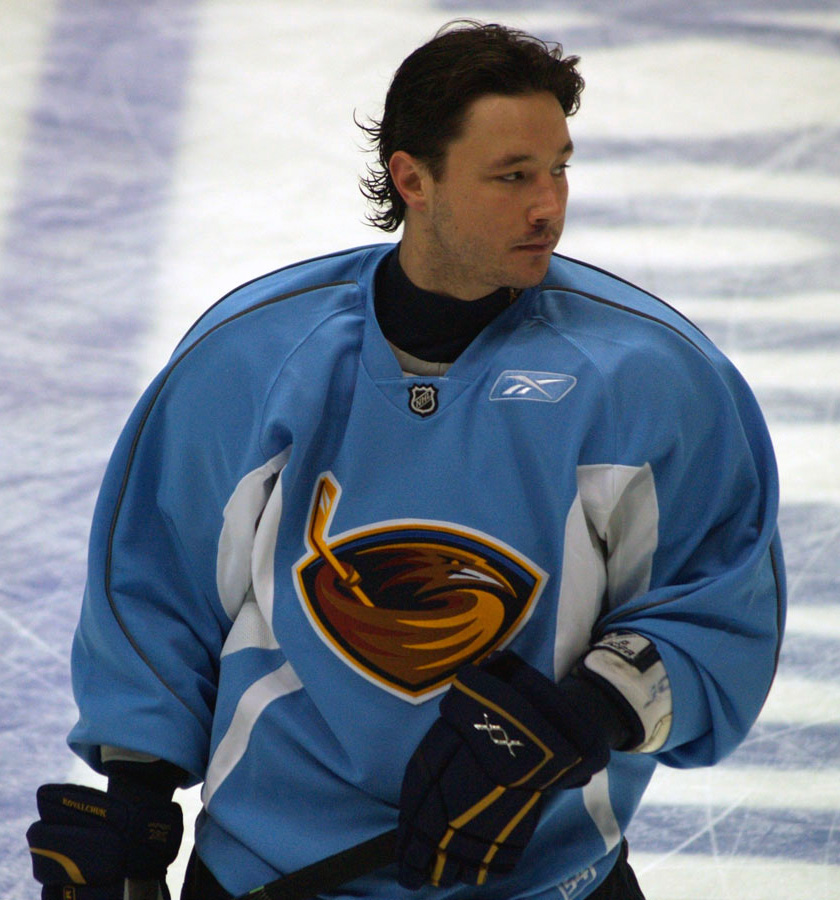
Kovalchuk with the Atlanta Thrashers during the 2005–06 season.

Due to the 2004–05 NHL lockout, Kovalchuk returned to Russia, playing for both Ak Bars Kazan and Khimik Moscow Oblast of the Russian Superleague (RSL). After the lockout, Kovalchuk and the Thrashers could not initially agree to a new contract, so he stayed in Russia, rejoining Khimik Moscow Oblast. He played 11 games for the team, recording 8 goals and 13 points before returning to the Thrashers and NHL after signing a five-year, $32 million contract. During the 2005–06 season, he scored 52 goals, tying him with rookie Alexander Ovechkin of the Washington Capitals for third in the NHL in scoring, behind Jonathan Cheechoo of the San Jose Sharks (56) and Jaromír Jágr of the New York Rangers (54). He also tied his career-high of 46 assists for a career-high 98 points, leading the Thrashers in team scoring for the second consecutive season, while finishing eighth overall in NHL scoring. He also became the first Thrashers player to score 50 goals in a season.

In the 2006–07 season, Kovalchuk's point production dropped for the first time in his career. He finished with 42 goals and 34 assists for 76 points. During a game against the Nashville Predators on 11 January 2006, Predators head coach Barry Trotz accused Kovalchuk with "always plays with an illegal stick". Trotz had asked the referees to check Kovalchuk's stick following a Thrashers goal, but claimed Kovalchuk was able to switch his stick before the referees could check. Despite his drop in production on the season, Kovalchuk and the Thrashers qualified for the Stanley Cup playoffs for the first time in franchise history. Kovalchuk scored one goal and one assist in his NHL playoffs debut as the team lost in the opening round to the New York Rangers in four games.

In 2007–08, Kovalchuk scored two consecutive hat-tricks in a loss to the Ottawa Senators and a win against the Tampa Bay Lightning on 1 and 3 November 2007, respectively. Later that season, on 23 January 2008, Kovalchuk was suspended for one game by the NHL for a hit from behind on New York Rangers defenceman Michal Rozsíval in a game a day prior. He finished with his second 52-goal season in three years, along with 35 assists for 87 points.

With the departure of Bobby Holík to the New Jersey Devils in the 2008 off-season, the Thrashers' captaincy remained vacant for the first half of the 2008–09 season. Kovalchuk served as one of five alternate captains to start the season until the alternates collectively requested to general manager Don Waddell and head coach John Anderson for Kovalchuk to take over the captaincy. Soon thereafter, on 11 January 2009, Kovalchuk was named Holík's successor and the sixth team captain in Thrashers' history during the team's Casino Night charity event. The announcement came amidst speculation that the Thrashers were looking to trade Kovalchuk, as his contract was set to expire at the end of the following season. Kovalchuk completed his first season as team captain with 43 goals for his fifth consecutive 40-goal season and 91 points.

Near the beginning of the 2009–10 season, Kovalchuk scored the 300th and 301st goal of his NHL career in a 4–2 win during the St. Louis Blues' home opener on 8 October 2009. He was leading the NHL in goals several weeks into the season when he suffered a broken foot after blocking a shot in a game against the San Jose Sharks on 24 October.

=== New Jersey Devils (2010–2013) ===
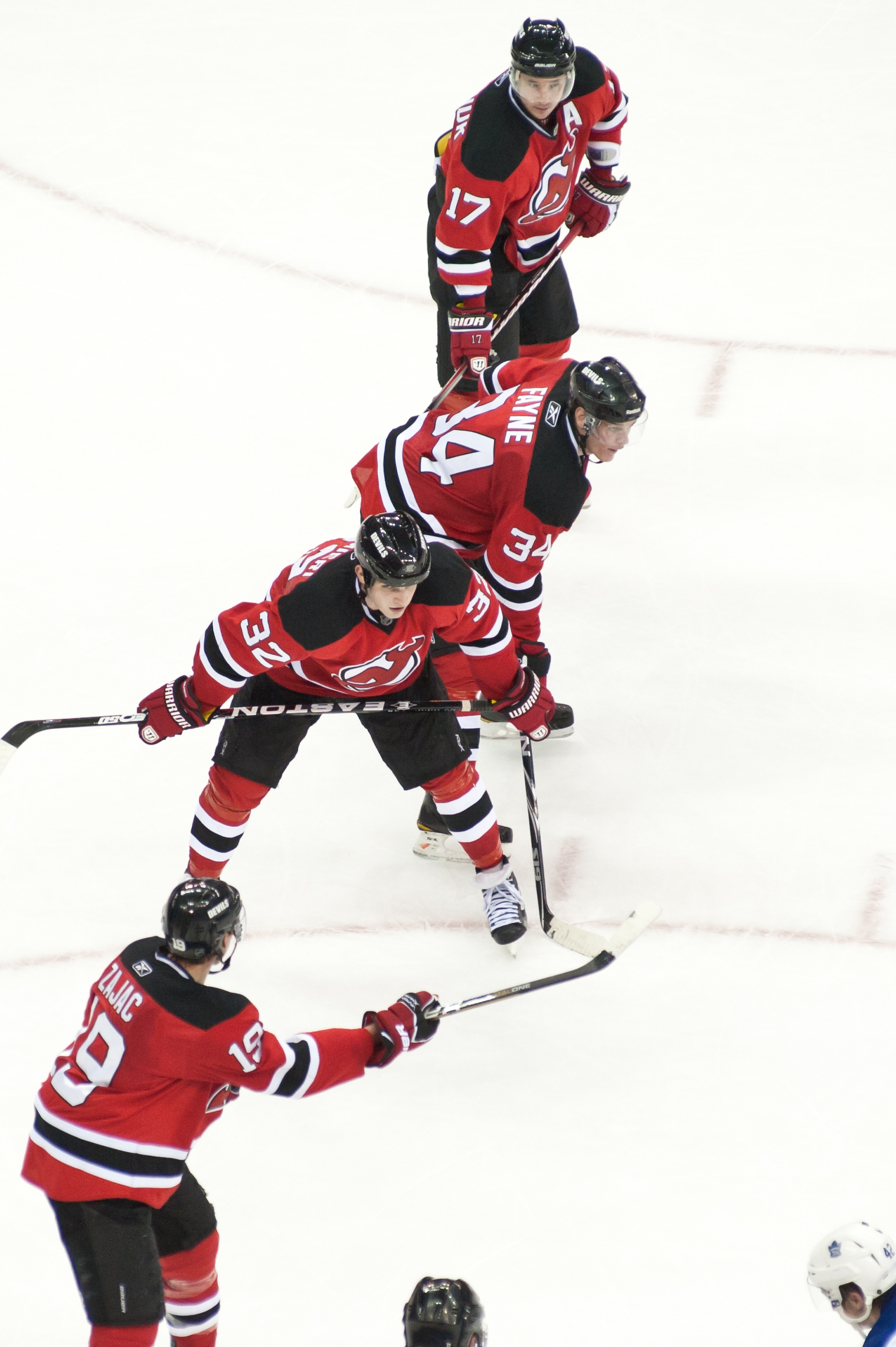
Kovalchuk (top) playing for the New Jersey Devils, alongside Travis Zajac (#19, foreground), Nick Palmieri (#32), and Mark Fayne (#34).

In the final year of his contract, Kovalchuk and the Thrashers could not come to an agreement on an extension. Thrashers general manager Don Waddell reportedly offered 12-year, $101 million and seven-year, $70 million contracts, both of which Kovalchuk turned down. A few days after Kovalchuk rejected the second contract offer, Waddell told him that he was going to be traded, rather than risk losing him to unrestricted free agency for nothing in the off-season, despite the fact that the Thrashers were still in the playoff race. On 4 February 2010, Kovalchuk was traded to the New Jersey Devils. Atlanta received defenceman Johnny Oduya, rookie forward Niclas Bergfors, junior prospect Patrice Cormier and a first-round selection in the 2010 NHL entry draft in exchange for Kovalchuk and defenceman Anssi Salmela; the teams also traded second-round selections in the 2010 NHL entry draft. Kovalchuk left the Thrashers as their all-time leader in several categories, including games played, goals, assists and points. He recorded two assists the following day in his Devils' debut, a 4–3 win over the Toronto Maple Leafs on 5 February. Kovalchuk eventually ended the season with 41 goals along with 44 assists, for 85 points split between Atlanta and New Jersey. On 10 February 2011, Kovalchuk scored the game-winning goal in a game over the Maple Leafs to give Jacques Lemaire the 600th win of his coaching career.

Kovalchuk recorded a Gordie Howe hat trick – a goal, an assist, and a fight – on 4 February 2012, the second anniversary of his trade to the Devils, against the Philadelphia Flyers. This was the first such hat trick ever recorded by Kovalchuk and second in the Devils' franchise, following Adam Henrique the month before. Kovalchuk assisted on two goals by teammate Kurtis Foster, scored a short-handed goal, then fought Brayden Schenn after a scrum formed when Flyers forward Zac Rinaldo performed a slew-foot on Devils captain Zach Parise.

Kovalchuk recorded his first scoring hat-trick as a member of the Devils on 14 February 2012, during a 4–1 victory in Buffalo against the Sabres.

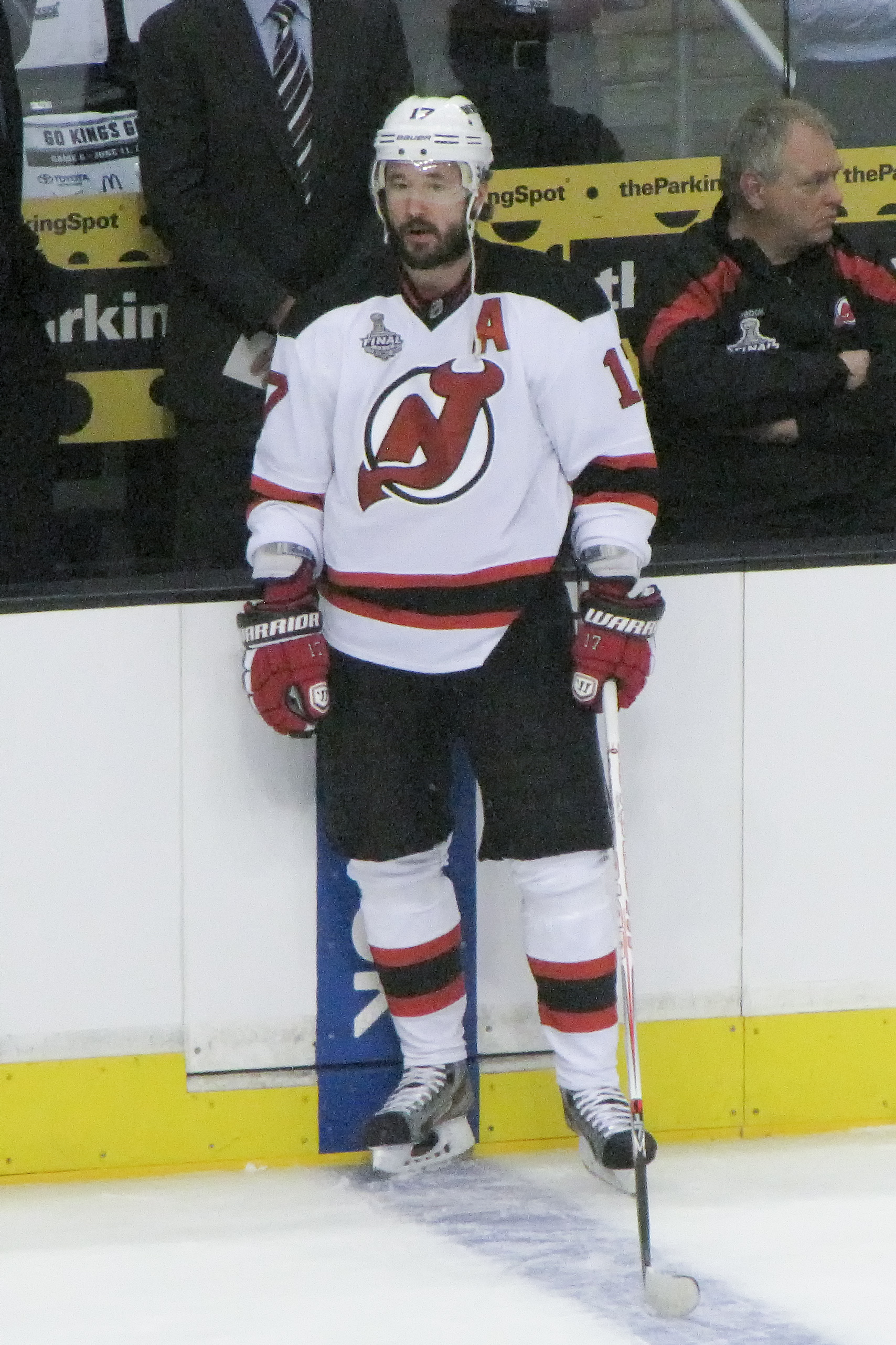
Kovalchuk with the Devils during the 2012 Stanley Cup Final.

On 8 March, Kovalchuk's 13th career hat trick and second hat-trick as a New Jersey Devil was recorded. The Devils won 5–1 against the New York Islanders, with Kovalchuk being the first star of the night. On 20 March, Kovalchuk became the 87th player in NHL history to score 400 goals. It was the lone goal of a 1–0 victory over the Ottawa Senators. He was given third star of the night.

Kovalchuk ended the 2011–12 season with seven game-deciding shootout goals and 11 shootout goals in total, setting a new record in both categories. The NHL first introduced shootouts in 2005. Kovalchuk and the Devils won the 2011–12 Eastern Conference finals against the New York Rangers in six games, setting a Stanley Cup meeting with the Los Angeles Kings. Despite leading the 2012 playoffs in scoring through the first three rounds, Kovalchuk was playing with a herniated disc and was largely ineffective against the Kings, scoring just one point in the series, an empty-net goal in game 4, as the Devils fell to the Kings in six games.

==== Contract controversy ====
Kovalchuk became an unrestricted free agent on 1 July 2010. On 19 July, after receiving offers from other teams, Kovalchuk agreed to a 17-year, $102 million deal to remain with the Devils. The length of the deal broke the record for the longest contract in NHL history. However, the contract was blocked by the NHL the next day on the ground it circumvented the NHL salary cap. Arbitrator Richard Bloch heard the National Hockey League Players' Association (NHLPA)'s appeal and ultimately nullified the deal.

Another contract was subsequently submitted to the NHL. During the early morning hours of 4 September 2010, the NHL approved the contract along with a new agreement with the NHLPA. The contract was for 15-years and worth $100 million.

Consequently, the NHL penalized the Devils for trying to circumvent the NHL salary cap with Kovalchuk's original contract. As a result, the Devils surrendered $3 million, a third-round draft choice in the 2011 NHL entry draft and one future first-round draft pick within the next four seasons. The Devils decided to use their first-round draft pick in the 2011 and 2012 NHL Entry Drafts and were to surrender their first-round pick in 2014. However, on 6 March 2014, the NHL announced it would forgive part of the $3 million fine and grant the Devils the 30th pick in the first round of the 2014 NHL entry draft.

=== SKA Saint Petersburg (2013–2018) ===
As a result of the 2012–13 NHL lockout, Kovalchuk elected to sign a temporary contract with SKA Saint Petersburg of the Kontinental Hockey League (KHL) on 18 September 2012. Kovalchuk played in Russia until a labor agreement was reached between the NHLPA and the NHL in January, allowing the 2012–13 NHL season to start. Kovalchuk was named captain of SKA Saint Petersburg at his contract signing. In addition, Kovalchuk was the subject of criticism for not returning to the United States immediately after the lockout ended, instead electing to be one of two participating NHL players in the KHL All-Star Game (the other being Pavel Datsyuk). Kovalchuk served as the captain of the Western Conference and returned to the United States to the Devils' training camp immediately after. He finished the season with 31 points in 37 games for the Devils, and 42 points in 36 games for SKA.

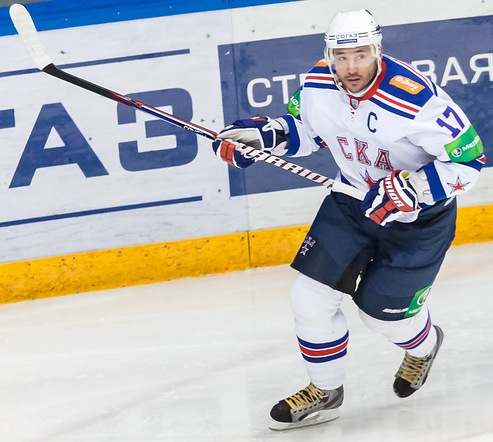
Kovalchuk with SKA Saint Petersburg in 2012.

On 11 July 2013, Kovalchuk chose to retire from the NHL. Although Devils general manager Lou Lamoriello knew Kovalchuk had been considering retirement since before the 2012–13 shortened season, Kovalchuk's departure came as a surprise to the public. Upon leaving, Kovalchuk had $77 million and 12 years remaining on his contract. Kovalchuk claimed he desired to return home to Russia along with his family, though it was speculated that money had quite an influence as well, due to the higher total salary Kovalchuk would receive in Russia via the far lower Russian tax rate compared to the U.S. Kovalchuk tallied 417 goals and 816 points in 816 games in his first stint in the NHL.

Kovalchuk signed a four-year contract with SKA Saint Petersburg on 15 July 2013. The contract, signed less than a week after Kovalchuk's retirement from the NHL, was alleged to be comparable to his former contract with the Devils. He helped the team win the 2014–15 Gagarin Cup for the first time. He was chosen as the MVP of 2015 Gagarin Cup playoffs, but passed the award to Evgenii Dadonov. He won a second Gagarin Cup, again with SKA Saint Petersburg, in 2016–17.

=== Los Angeles Kings (2018–2019) ===
Kovalchuk announced after the 2017–18 season that he would attempt a return to the NHL. Several teams expressed interest, including the Los Angeles Kings, Vegas Golden Knights, San Jose Sharks and Boston Bruins. On 23 June 2018, it was announced Kovalchuk and the Kings had agreed to a three-year contract, effective 1 July, with an average yearly value of $6.25 million. He scored his first goal on 9 October 2018, against the Winnipeg Jets, the franchise he had spent most of his first NHL stint with when they were the Thrashers.

On 5 February 2019, the Kings faced the Devils at Prudential Center. Each time Kovalchuk touched the puck or the PA announcer, Kevin Clark, mentioned his name, Kovalchuk was roundly booed by Devils fans. Kovalchuk scored once as the Kings defeated the Devils 5–1.

With 14 points in his first 14 games, the 2018–19 season had started well for Kovalchuk, but badly for the team. Head coach John Stevens was fired and replaced by Willie Desjardins, who reduced Kovalchuk's ice time significantly. As a disappointing season came to a close, Kovalchuk expressed his frustration, saying "I don't have a chance" under Desjardins. The day after their season ended, having finished second from the bottom overall, the Kings announced that Desjardins would not be back the following year.

In the 2019–20 season, after Kovalchuk had played his seventeenth game for the Kings, the team announced that he would be scratched for the "foreseeable future". On 17 December the Kings terminated Kovalchuk's contract and he became an unrestricted free agent.

=== Montreal Canadiens and Washington Capitals (2020) ===
On 3 January 2020, Kovalchuk signed a one-year, two-way league minimum contract with the Montreal Canadiens. On 6 January, Kovalchuk played his first game with the Canadiens, against the Winnipeg Jets, and collected one assist in a 3–2 loss. On January 11, Kovalchuk scored his first goal with the Canadiens, the game-winner against the Ottawa Senators in overtime. He quickly became a solid contributor for the Canadiens posting a two goal game three games later and put up eight points in his first eight games for the team.

Despite his contributions, the team was out of the playoff picture and after 22-game and 13-point tenure, Kovalchuk was traded on 23 February 2020 to the Washington Capitals in exchange for a third-round pick in the 2020 NHL entry draft. Kovalchuk recorded four points in seven regular season games and one point in eight playoff games as the Capitals were eliminated in the first round of the 2020 Stanley Cup playoffs by the New York Islanders.

=== Avangard Omsk (2020–2021) ===
Kovalchuk returned to the KHL for the 2020–21 season, as he signed a two-year contract with Avangard Omsk on 26 December. Kovalchuk won the Gagarin Cup with Avangard on 28 April 2021, and on 30 April 2021, he and Avangard mutually agreed to terminate his contract.

=== Return to Spartak (2023–2024) ===
After two years away from professional hockey, Kovalchuk opted to return to his youth club of Spartak Moscow, signing a one-year contract on 6 December 2023.

Kovalchuk officially retired on 14 March, 2025.

== International play ==
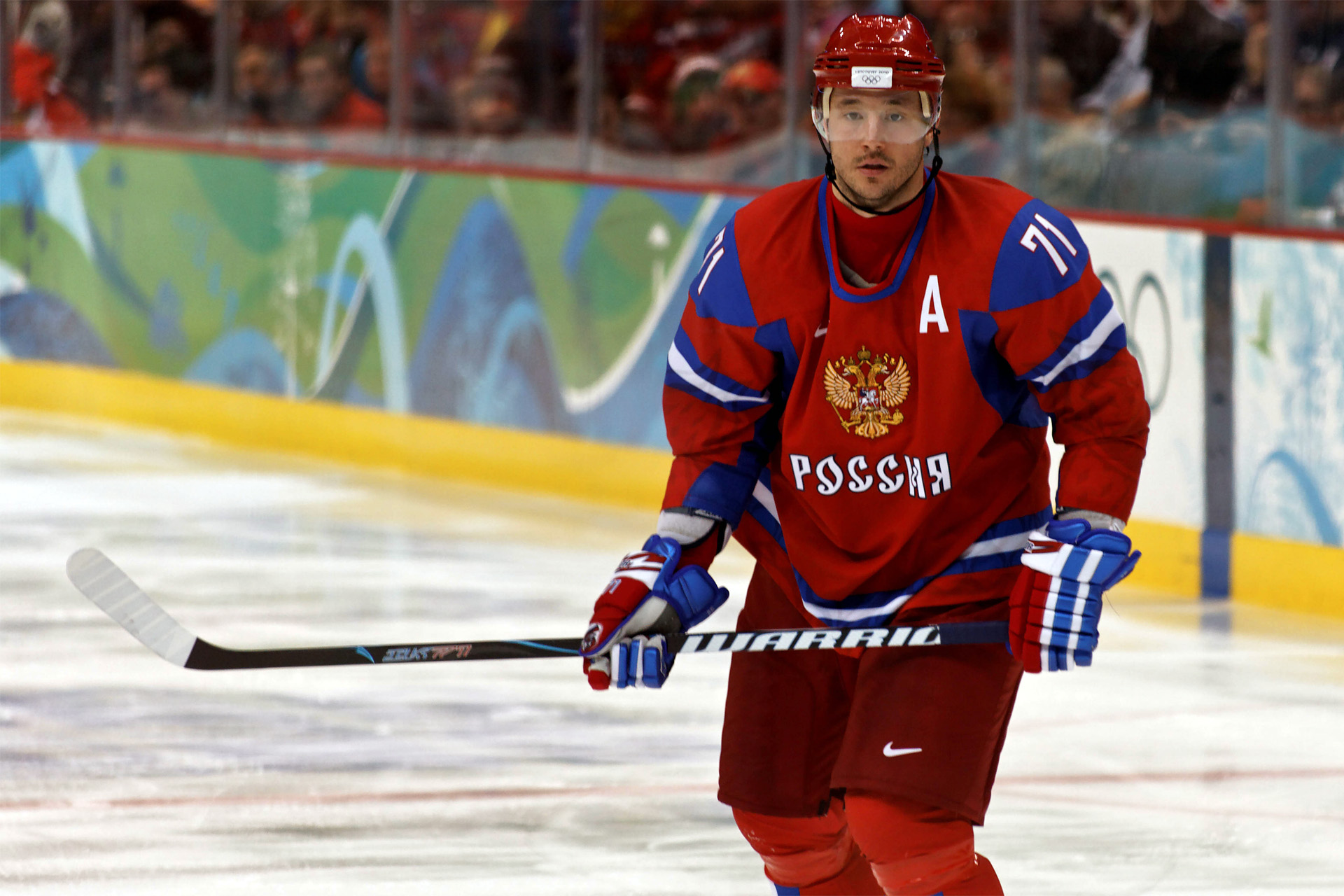
- Kovalchuk at the 2010 Winter Olympics

Medal record

Men's ice hockey

Representing Olympic Athletes from Russia

Olympic Games
Gold medal – first place	2018 Pyeongchang	

Representing Russia

Olympic Games
Bronze medal – third place	2002 Salt Lake City	

World Championships
Gold medal – first place	2008 Canada	
Gold medal – first place	2009 Switzerland	
Silver medal – second place	2010 Germany	
Silver medal – second place	2015 Czech Republic	
Bronze medal – third place	2005 Austria	
Bronze medal – third place	2007 Russia	
Bronze medal – third place	2019 Slovakia	

IIHF World U18 Championships
Gold medal – first place	2001 Finland	
Silver medal – second place	2000 Switzerland	

Kovalchuk won his first medals with Russia in a major international event at the IIHF World U18 Championships, earning silver and gold medals in 2000 and 2001, respectively. He also competed for Russia at the World Junior Championships in 2001, but finished seventh.

The following year, Kovalchuk made his senior international debut with Russia at the 2002 Winter Olympics in Salt Lake City, during his rookie NHL season with the Atlanta Thrashers. He recorded three points in six games to help Russia to a bronze medal finish. He then made his World Championships debut in 2003, but failed to medal.

Kovalchuk made his second straight Winter Olympics appearance in 2006 in Turin. He had a four-goal game on February 19 in a 9–2 win over Latvia, but returned to Atlanta without a medal, losing in the bronze medal game.

In 2008, Kovalchuk played in the IIHF World Championship, held in Quebec City and Halifax. He scored his only two goals of the tournament in the gold medal game against Team Canada – one to force the game into overtime, then the game-winner to give Russia the championship. The following year, he led Russia to a second straight gold medal over Canada in the 2009 IIHF World Championship and was named the tournament MVP.

In May 2010, Kovalchuk played for Russia at IIHF World Championship in Germany, finishing second.

At the 2015 IIHF World Championship, Kovalchuk served as captain of Russia. After losing the gold medal game to Canada, Kovalchuk and many of the Russian players left the ice after receiving their silver medals, but prior to the playing of the Canadian national anthem. The Russian Hockey Federation was fined for the act, and while the IIHF determined Kovalchuk gave an "unmistakable head gesture" for his team to leave, he was not independently punished.

== Personal life ==
=== Marriage and children ===
Kovalchuk met his future wife, Nicole Andrazajtis, in 2002 after being introduced by mutual friends. Nicole was a well known singer in Russia at the time and was part of the group Mirage. They married in 2008 at Church of Dormition in Russia. Together they have four children: daughters Karolina and Eva, born in 2005 and 2015; and sons Philipp and Artem, born in 2009 and 2010, respectively.

=== Politics ===
Kovalchuk is a member of Alexander Ovechkin's PutinTeam which was founded in 2017 to promote Vladimir Putin's 2018 presidential campaign.

== Career statistics ==
=== Records ===
==== NHL ====
- Record for most shootout goals in a single-season (11) (2011–12)
- Record for most game-deciding shootout goals in a single-season (7) (2011–12)
- Atlanta Thrashers franchise single season goal total, 52 (2005–06, 2007–08)

=== Regular season and playoffs ===
Bold indicates led league

			Regular season					Playoffs
Season	Team	League	GP	G	A	Pts	PIM	GP	G	A	Pts	PIM
1999–00	Spartak Moscow	RUS-2	49	12	5	17	75	—	—	—	—	—
1999–00	Spartak–2 Moscow	RUS-3	2	2	1	3	14	—	—	—	—	—
2000–01	Spartak Moscow	RUS-2	40	28	18	46	78	12	14	4	18	38
2001–02	Atlanta Thrashers	NHL	65	29	22	51	28	—	—	—	—	—
2002–03	Atlanta Thrashers	NHL	81	38	29	67	57	—	—	—	—	—
2003–04	Atlanta Thrashers	NHL	81	**41**	46	87	63	—	—	—	—	—
2004–05	Ak Bars Kazan	RSL	53	19	23	42	72	4	0	1	1	0
2005–06	Khimik Moscow Oblast	RSL	11	8	5	13	24	—	—	—	—	—
2005–06	Atlanta Thrashers	NHL	78	52	46	98	68	—	—	—	—	—
2006–07	Atlanta Thrashers	NHL	82	42	34	76	66	4	1	1	2	19
2007–08	Atlanta Thrashers	NHL	79	52	35	87	52	—	—	—	—	—
2008–09	Atlanta Thrashers	NHL	79	43	48	91	50	—	—	—	—	—
2009–10	Atlanta Thrashers	NHL	49	31	27	58	45	—	—	—	—	—
2009–10	New Jersey Devils	NHL	27	10	17	27	8	5	2	4	6	6
2010–11	New Jersey Devils	NHL	81	31	29	60	28	—	—	—	—	—
2011–12	New Jersey Devils	NHL	77	37	46	83	33	23	**8**	11	19	6
2012–13	SKA Saint Petersburg	KHL	36	18	24	42	12	—	—	—	—	—
2012–13	New Jersey Devils	NHL	37	11	20	31	18	—	—	—	—	—
2013–14	SKA Saint Petersburg	KHL	45	16	24	40	38	10	3	2	5	31
2014–15	SKA Saint Petersburg	KHL	54	25	30	55	69	22	8	11	19	12
2015–16	SKA Saint Petersburg	KHL	50	16	33	49	24	4	0	0	0	2
2016–17	SKA Saint Petersburg	KHL	60	32	46	78	47	18	6	3	9	35
2017–18	SKA Saint Petersburg	KHL	53	31	32	63	26	15	6	4	10	12
2018–19	Los Angeles Kings	NHL	64	16	18	34	10	—	—	—	—	—
2019–20	Los Angeles Kings	NHL	17	3	6	9	12	—	—	—	—	—
2019–20	Montreal Canadiens	NHL	22	6	7	13	2	—	—	—	—	—
2019–20	Washington Capitals	NHL	7	1	3	4	4	8	0	1	1	2
2020–21	Avangard Omsk	KHL	16	5	12	17	16	24	4	5	9	31
2023–24	Spartak Moscow	KHL	20	4	4	8	2	5	0	0	0	2
NHL totals			926	443	433	876	544	40	11	17	28	33
RSL totals			64	27	28	55	96	4	0	1	1	0
KHL totals			334	147	205	352	234	98	27	25	52	125

=== International ===
Year	Team	Event	GP	G	A	Pts	PIM
2000	Russia	U17	6	10	4	14	2
2000	Russia	WJC18	6	2	3	5	6
2001	Russia	WJC	7	4	2	6	37
2001	Russia	WJC18	6	11	4	15	26
2002	Russia	OLY	6	1	2	3	14
2003	Russia	WC	7	4	0	4	6
2004	Russia	WC	6	3	1	4	6
2004	Russia	WCH	4	1	0	1	4
2005	Russia	WC	9	3	3	6	4
2006	Russia	OLY	8	4	1	5	31
2007	Russia	WC	9	2	5	7	10
2008	Russia	WC	8	2	6	8	52
2009	Russia	WC	9	5	9	14	4
2010	Russia	OLY	4	1	2	3	0
2010	Russia	WC	9	2	10	12	2
2011	Russia	WC	9	3	5	8	6
2013	Russia	WC	8	8	5	13	29
2014	Russia	OLY	5	3	0	3	2
2015	Russia	WC	10	2	3	5	2
2018	OAR	OLY	6	5	2	7	4
2019	Russia	WC	10	2	3	5	4
Junior totals			25	27	13	40	71
Senior totals			127	51	57	108	180

=== All-Star Games ===
Year	Location	G	A	P
2004	St. Paul	1	0	1
2008	Atlanta	0	1	1
2009	Montreal	0	0	0
2013	Chelyabinsk	3	0	3
2014	Bratislava	1	2	3
2015	Sochi	4	2	6
NHL All-Star totals		1	1	2
KHL All-Star totals		8	4	12

== Awards and achievements ==
=== RSL/KHL ===
- KHL All-Star Game – 2013, 2014, 2015
- Gagarin Cup winner – 2015, 2017, 2021
- Gagarin Cup playoffs MVP – 2015 (refused to accept and passed it to Evgenii Dadonov)

=== NHL ===
- NHL All-Rookie Team – 2002
- NHL first All-Star team – 2012
- NHL second All-Star team – 2004
- 2002 NHL YoungStars Game MVP
- NHL All-Star Game – 2004, 2008, 2009
- Maurice "Rocket" Richard Trophy – 2004 (tied with Rick Nash and Jarome Iginla)

=== International ===
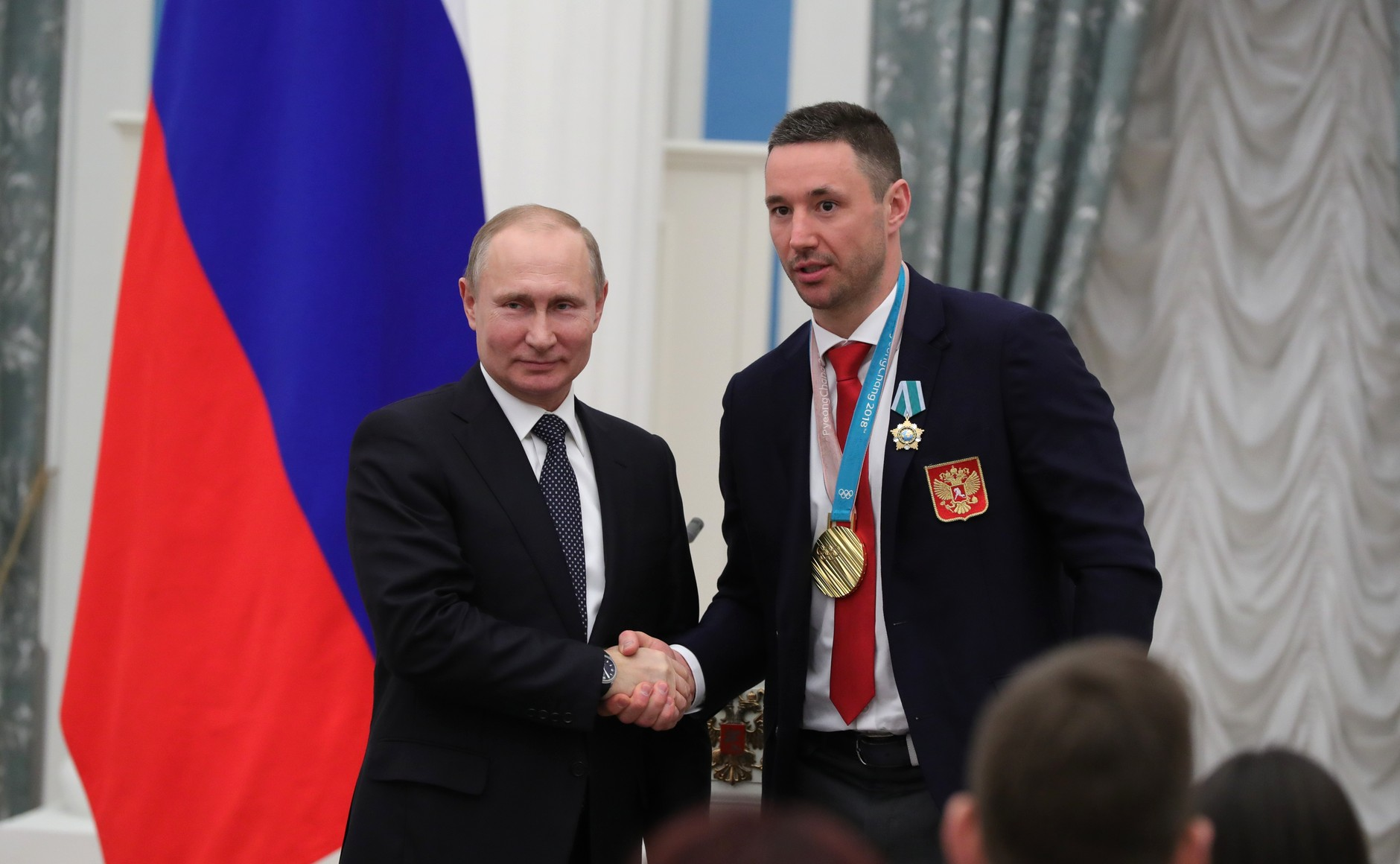
Kovalchuk with his 2018 Winter Olympic gold medal meeting Russian president Vladimir Putin.

- 2002 Winter Olympics – bronze medal
- 2018 Winter Olympics – gold medal
- 2018 Winter Olympics MVP
- 2008 World Championship – gold medal
- 2009 World Championship – gold medal
- 2009 World Championship MVP
- 2009 World Championship best forward
- Kharlamov Trophy – 2004

Awards and achievements
Preceded by Rick DiPietro	NHL first overall draft pick 2001	Succeeded by Rick Nash
Preceded by Dany Heatley	Atlanta Thrashers first-round draft pick 2001	Succeeded by Kari Lehtonen
Preceded by Milan Hejduk	Co-winner of the Rocket Richard Trophy (with Jarome Iginla and Rick Nash); 2004	Succeeded by Jonathan Cheechoo
Preceded by Bobby Holík	Atlanta Thrashers captain 2009–10	Succeeded by Andrew Ladd
