= 2015 Gagarin Cup playoffs =

Tournament details
- Dates: February 27–April 19, 2015
- Teams: 16

Final positions
- Champions: SKA Saint Petersburg
- Runner-up: Ak Bars Kazan

Tournament statistics
- Scoring leader(s): Vadim Shipachyov (SKA) (22 points)

The 2015 Gagarin Cup playoffs of the Kontinental Hockey League (KHL) began on February 27, 2015, with the top eight teams from each of the conferences, after the conclusion of the 2014–15 KHL regular season.

SKA Saint Petersburg won the trophy for the first time in its history after defeating Ak Bars Kazan in the final series. Before that, they won the conference final after trailing 0-3 against CSKA Moscow, which is the only reverse sweep in the history of the KHL.

== Playoff seeds ==
After the regular season, the standard 16 teams qualified for the playoffs. The CSKA Moscow became the Western Conference regular season champions and Continental Cup winners with 139 points. The Ak Bars Kazan were the Eastern Conference regular season champions, finishing the season with 120 points. New addition Jokerit made the playoffs in its first season in the KHL.

== Draw ==
The playoffs began on February 27, 2015, with the top eight teams from each of the conferences., and ended with the last game of the Gagarin Cup final.

Conference Quarterfinals	Conference Semifinals
1	(Russia) Ak Bars	4
8	(Russia) Avtomobilist	1
1	(Russia) Ak Bars	4
4	(Russia) Avangard	1
2	(Russia) Sibir	4
7	(Russia) Traktor	2
Eastern Conference
3	(Russia) Metallurg Mg	4
6	(Russia) Salavat Yulaev	1
2	(Russia) Sibir	4
3	(Russia) Metallurg Mg	1
4	(Russia) Avangard	4
5	(Kazakhstan) Barys	3
1	(Russia) CSKA	4
8	(Russia) HC Sochi	0
1	(Russia) CSKA	4
4	(Finland) Jokerit	1
2	(Russia) SKA	4
7	(Russia) Torpedo	1
Western Conference
3	(Russia) Dynamo Msk	4
6	(Russia) Lokomotiv	2
2	(Russia) SKA	4
3	(Russia) Dynamo Msk	1
4	(Finland) Jokerit	4
5	(Belarus) Dinamo Mn	1

Conference Finals
1	(Russia) Ak Bars	4
2	(Russia) Sibir	1
1	(Russia) CSKA	3
2	(Russia) SKA	4

Gagarin Cup Finals
1	(Russia) Ak Bars	1
2	(Russia) SKA	4

== Player statistics ==
=== Scoring leaders ===
GP = Games played; G = Goals; A = Assists; Pts = Points; +/– = Plus–minus; PIM = Penalty minutes

As of 19 Apr 2015

Player	Team	GP	G	A	Pts	+/–	PIM
(Russia) Vadim Shipachyov	SKA Saint Petersburg	22	6	16	22	+11	2
(Russia) Alexander Radulov	CSKA Moscow	16	8	13	21	+7	20
(Russia) Evgenii Dadonov	SKA Saint Petersburg	22	15	5	20	+12	8
(Russia) Igor Grigorenko	CSKA Moscow	14	10	9	19	+6	8
(Russia) Ilya Kovalchuk	SKA Saint Petersburg	22	8	11	19	+6	12

=== Leading goaltenders ===
GP = Games played; Min = Minutes played; W = Wins; L = Losses; SOP = Shootouts played; GA = Goals against; SO = Shutouts; SV% = Save percentage; GAA = Goals against average

As of 15 Apr 2015

Player	Team	GP	Min	W	L	GA	SO	SV%	GAA
(Sweden) Anders Nilsson	Ak Bars Kazan	18	1124:39	13	5	23	6	.947	1.23
(Czech Republic) Alexander Salák	Sibir Novosibirsk	14	803:14	8	5	21	1	.943	1.57
(Finland) Mikko Koskinen	SKA Saint Petersburg	20	1256:41	14	6	34	3	.935	1.62
(Russia) Alexander Lazushin	Dynamo Moscow	10	587:23	5	5	16	2	.937	1.63
(Russia) Stanislav Galimov	CSKA Moscow	8	394:55	5	1	11	2	.933	1.67
(Belarus) Kevin Lalande	CSKA Moscow	11	611:42	6	4	17	2	.929	1.67
