= List of teams that have overcome 3–1 series deficits =

Notable comebacks in playoff series in sports

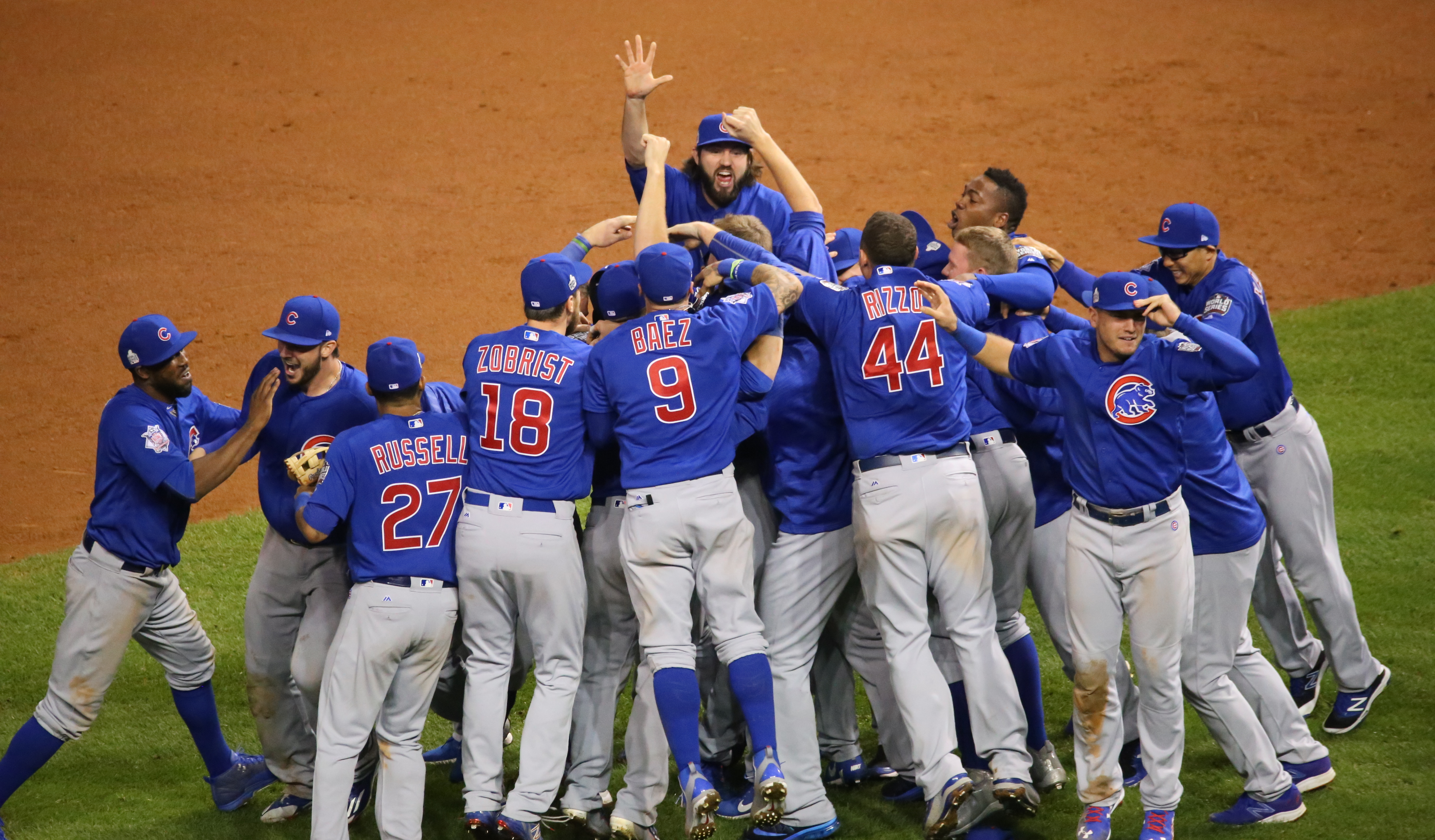
The Chicago Cubs celebrating their victory in the 2016 World Series, which they won in seven games after trailing three games to one

The following is the list of teams that have overcome 3–1 series deficits mainly concerning North American professional sports within a best-of-seven series. The listed teams won three consecutive games after being down three games to one. Unsuccessful comebacks are also listed, in which teams evened a series after being behind 3–1, then lost the final game of the series.

The best-of-seven playoff structure is common in North American professional sports, particularly in the sports of baseball, basketball, and ice hockey, and prominently in three of the major North American professional sports leagues: Major League Baseball, the National Basketball Association, and the National Hockey League.

There are also some intermediate North American leagues below the major league level that use the best-of-seven format, such as hockey's Calder Cup. The format is also used outside of North America, including the Taiwan Series baseball tournament, the final round of the Japan Series, the Chinese, Italian, Lithuanian, Polish, and Turkish basketball leagues, and later rounds of the Gagarin Cup of the Kontinental Hockey League (KHL) based in Russia, Belarus, Kazakhstan and China.

All 3–1 deficit comebacks in a seven-game series involve winning three straight elimination games, including a winner-take-all Game 7. Longer series of this nature are almost always structured as single-elimination knockout tournaments, so one more loss ends playoff contention for the losing side.

This is similar to a comeback from a 2–0 series deficit in a best-of-five series, which also requires winning three straight games.

Implicit in overcoming a 3–1 series deficit are all teams that have overcome a 3–0 series deficit. These are noted in the series comment cells and — lacking an explicit column in the tabular format — can be identified with a "3–0".

== Background ==
Three major North American professional sports leagues have playoff series that can reach a seventh game: Major League Baseball (MLB), the National Basketball Association (NBA), and the National Hockey League (NHL). In the history of these leagues, teams that were down 3–1 in a series have come back to win the series 59 times: 14 times in MLB, 15 times in the NBA, and 31 times in the NHL. The most recent instance was accomplished by the Detroit Pistons of the NBA in the 2026 NBA playoffs.

There have been three instances of a team coming back from a 3–1 deficit twice in the same postseason, occurring once each in the MLB, NBA, and NHL. The most recent instance was by the Denver Nuggets in the 2020 NBA playoffs. The other two instances occurred by the Kansas City Royals in the 1985 MLB postseason (the only instance where that team also won the championship) and the Minnesota Wild in the 2003 Stanley Cup playoffs.

Within the World Hockey Association and American Basketball Association, which each merged with the NHL and NBA, respectively, only one team came back from a 3–1 deficit: the Indiana Pacers came back to defeat the Kentucky Colonels in the Eastern Division Semifinals of the 1969 ABA Playoffs. The WHA had just one team force a game seven after being down 3–1 with the Quarterfinals in the 1976 WHA playoffs; the Indianapolis Racers forced game seven but lost to the New England Whalers.

== Key ==
	Indicates the team that had home advantage
	Indicates series in the championship round
Eventual champion	Indicates the series winner won (or went on to win) the championship

== Major League Baseball ==
=== Successful comebacks ===
MLB teams have overcome 3–1 deficits 14 times (including 1 when trailing 3–0), 6 of which occurred in the World Series. This does not count the 1903 World Series, during which the Boston Americans (or Puritans, or Pilgrims, depending on the source, and later known as the Red Sox) came back from a 3–1 deficit to defeat the Pittsburgh Pirates, 5 games to 3, as that was a best-of-9 series. The most recent instance was accomplished by the Los Angeles Dodgers during the 2020 NLCS. The Boston Red Sox have the most 3–1 comebacks, with 3. The St. Louis Cardinals have the most blown 3–1 leads, with 4.

Year and series	Series Winner	Series Loser	Note(s)	Pattern
1925 World Series	Pittsburgh Pirates	Washington Senators	In Game 7, the Pirates trailed 4–0 and faced a 7–6 deficit with 2 outs in the 8th inning. The Pirates would then rally for 3 runs in the 8th, capped off by a 2-run double by Kiki Cuyler, to make it 9–7, which would be the series-winning hit. The Pirates became the first major North American professional sports team to overcome a 3–1 deficit in a best-of-7 series.	WSH → PIT → WSH → WSH → PIT → PIT → PIT
1958 World Series	New York Yankees	Milwaukee Braves	Also trailed 2–0 in the series, and the Yankees won games 6 and 7 in Milwaukee. In Game 6, the Yankees won in extra innings thanks to a go-ahead home run in the 10th by Gil McDougald, and an RBI single by Moose Skowron, before hanging on in the bottom half to win 4–3. In Game 7, the game was tied going into the 8th inning, before the Yankees rallied for 4 runs with 2 outs, giving them the lead for good, winning the game 6–2.	MLN → MLN → NYY → MLN → NYY → NYY → NYY
1968 World Series	Detroit Tigers	St. Louis Cardinals	For the second straight season, the Cardinals were forced to a Game 7 after previously leading the series 3–1. Tigers trailed 3–0 early in game 5, but rallied to win 5–3 thanks to a lead-changing 2-run single by Al Kaline in the 7th. The Tigers would then win Games 6 and 7 in St. Louis to complete the 3–1 comeback. After trailing 3–0 in Game 5, the Tigers outscored the Cardinals 22–2 for the rest of the series.	STL → DET → STL → STL → DET → DET → DET
1979 World Series	Pittsburgh Pirates	Baltimore Orioles	Pirates won games 6 and 7 in Baltimore. In Game 7, the Pirates led 2–1 in the 8th inning and were able to hang on to their lead after getting Eddie Murray to fly out with the bases loaded. The Pirates would add 2 runs in the 9th to win 4–1 and complete the comeback. After trailing 1–0 in Game 5, the Pirates outscored the Orioles 15–1 for the rest of the series. This was the second 3–1 comeback for the Pirates in franchise history.	BAL → PIT → BAL → BAL → PIT → PIT → PIT
1985 ALCS	Kansas City Royals	Toronto Blue Jays	This was the first year the LCS became a seven-game series, and the Royals also trailed 2–0 in the series. After going down 3–1 in the series, the Royals wouldn't trail the rest of the way, with games 6 and 7 being won in Toronto.	TOR → TOR → KC → TOR → KC → KC → KC
1985 World Series	Kansas City Royals	St. Louis Cardinals	Also trailed 2–0 in the series. In Game 6, the Royals trailed 1–0 going into the bottom of the 9th, 3 outs away from elimination. After pinch-hitter Jorge Orta was controversially called safe at first to lead off the inning, Jack Clark would lose track of a Steve Balboni foul pop-up which led to a single later in the at-bat. With runners on first and second and 1 out, Darrell Porter would allow a passed ball to advance both runners, setting up Dane Iorg, would hit a walk-off 2-run single to force a Game 7, after the Cardinals chose to intentionally walk the previous batter following the passed ball. The Royals then shutout the Cardinals 11–0 in Game 7 to complete the comeback. The Royals became the first MLB team to overcome two 3–1 deficits in the same postseason year, with them having also trailed 2–0 in both series. This was the second 3–1 comeback for the Royals in franchise history (and second of the postseason), and the second blown 3–1 lead for the Cardinals in franchise history.	STL → STL → KC → STL → KC → KC → KC
1986 ALCS	Boston Red Sox	California Angels	The Red Sox had a chance to tie the series 2–2 in Game 4 when they held a 3–0 lead going into the 9th inning, but they instead became the first team in postseason history to blow a 3-run 9th inning lead, to go down 3–1 in the series. However, they would turn the tables in Game 5 when they faced a 5–2 deficit in the 9th inning, 3 outs away from elimination. A 2-run homer by Don Baylor pulled the Red Sox within a run, then with the Red Sox down to their final strike, Dave Henderson hit a 2-run homer of his own to give the Red Sox a 6–5 lead. While the Angels would tie the game in the bottom of the 9th, the Red Sox would survive a bases loaded and 1 out situation to force extras. In the 11th, Henderson would hit a sacrifice fly to give the Red Sox a 7–6 lead, which they would hold to force a Game 6, becoming the second team in postseason history to comeback from down 3 runs in the 9th. The Red Sox trailed 2–0 early in Game 6, but dominated the rest of the series, winning Games 6 and 7, outscoring the Angels 18–3 the rest of the way. With this loss, the Angels fell to 0–6 in games where they had a chance to win the pennant.	CAL → BOS → CAL → CAL → BOS → BOS → BOS
1996 NLCS	Atlanta Braves	St. Louis Cardinals	The Braves blew a 3–0 lead in the 7th inning of Game 4 to go down 3–1 in the series, but would dominate the final 3 games, including wins in games 5 and 7 by scores of 14–0 and 15–0 respectively. In the final three games of the series, the Braves outscored the Cardinals 32–1. This was the third blown 3–1 lead for the Cardinals in franchise history.	ATL → STL → STL → STL → ATL → ATL → ATL
2003 NLCS	Florida Marlins	Chicago Cubs	The Marlins won games 6 and 7 in Chicago. In Game 6, the Marlins trailed 3–0 in the 8th inning, 5 outs away from elimination. After a double by Juan Pierre, Luis Castillo hit a pop-up near the stands that many Cubs fans reached for, before bouncing off of the hands of Steve Bartman. Moisés Alou was visibly angry, and the Cubs pleaded for a fan interference call, but to no avail. Castillo eventually walked before an RBI single by Iván Rodríguez made it 3–1. The next batter, Miguel Cabrera hit a groundball to shortstop Alex Gonzalez that looked like an inning-ending double play, but he instead committed just his 11th error of the season, to load the bases. From there the floodgates would open as the Marlins rallied for 8 runs in the inning, highlighted by a bases clearing 3-run double by Mike Mordecai, who had led off the inning, to break the game open. The Marlins won 8–3 to force a Game 7. The Marlins jumped out to an early 3–0 lead before the Cubs tied it, highlighted by a 2-run home run by pitcher Kerry Wood. The Marlins trailed 5–3 in the 5th before rallying for 3 runs to take the lead. They would add 3 more insurance runs in the 6th and 7th before closing out the game by a score of 9–6, completing the 3–1 series comeback. The Marlins went on to win the World Series.	FLA → CHC → CHC → CHC → FLA → FLA → FLA
2004 ALCS	Boston Red Sox	New York Yankees	The Red Sox trailed 3–0 in the series and were 3 outs away from being swept in Game 4. Trailing 4–3 in the bottom of the 9th, Kevin Millar walked to lead off the inning before being pinch ran for by Dave Roberts. Roberts stole second, and two pitches later, Bill Mueller tied the game with an RBI single to force extra innings. In the 12th inning, David Ortiz hit a walk-off 2-run home run to win the game 6–4 and force a Game 5. There, the Red Sox would once again trail late, down 4–2 in the bottom of the 8th. A home run by David Ortiz cut the deficit to 1, before Jason Varitek hit a sac fly to tie the game. The game would go deep into extra innings before David Ortiz played hero again, hitting a walk-off RBI single in the 14th inning to force a Game 6. Curt Schilling was the starter for the Red Sox in Game 6 and was playing with a torn tendon sheath in his right ankle. He went 7 innings, limiting the Yankees to just 1 run. The Red Sox won what would later be known as the "Bloody Sock Game" to force a Game 7, becoming the first MLB team to do so after trailing 3–0. The Red Sox dominated Game 7, going up 6–0 in the 2nd inning, thanks to a grand slam by Johnny Damon, and never looked back, winning 10–3. The Red Sox became the first team in MLB history to win a series after trailing 3–0. They went on to win the World Series for the first time since 1918, never having trailed a single time that series. This was the second 3–1 comeback for the Red Sox in franchise history.	NYY → NYY → NYY → BOS → BOS → BOS → BOS
2007 ALCS	Boston Red Sox	Cleveland Indians	After losing Game 4 to trail 3–1 in the series, the Red Sox dominated the Indians in the final 3 games, winning 7–1, 12–2 and 11–2; outscoring them by a combined 30–5. Despite Game 7 ending in a blowout, the Indians had a chance to tie the game in the 7th, but Kenny Lofton was controversially held at third base on a single by Franklin Gutiérrez, and ultimately did not score. The Red Sox then score 8 runs in the next two innings to put the series away for good. The Red Sox went on to win the World Series. This was the third 3–1 comeback for the Red Sox in franchise history.	BOS → CLE → CLE → CLE → BOS → BOS → BOS
2012 NLCS	San Francisco Giants	St. Louis Cardinals	The Giants reached the NLCS after overcoming a 2–0 series deficit in the NLDS. After losing Game 4 to trail 3–1 in the series, the Giants dominated the Cardinals in the final 3 games, winning 5–0, 6–1 and 9–0; outscoring them by a combined 20–1. The Giants went on to win the World Series. This was the fourth blown 3–1 lead for the Cardinals in franchise history.	STL → SF → STL → STL → SF → SF → SF
2016 World Series	Chicago Cubs	Cleveland Indians	Cubs won games 6 and 7 in Cleveland. Aroldis Chapman pitched an 8-out save to force a Game 6, and Addison Russell's 6 RBIs including a grand slam helped the Cubs force a Game 7. The Cubs led 5–1 in Game 7 before a rare 2-run wild pitch thrown by Jon Lester made it 5–3. David Ross would make it 6–3 on a home run in his final major league at-bat. This lead would hold until the bottom of the 8th, with the Cubs just 4 outs away from winning it all. However, the Indians would rally for 3 runs with 2 outs in the inning, capped off by a game-tying 2-run home run by Rajai Davis. The game went to extra innings, before Ben Zobrist hit a go-ahead RBI double, followed by an RBI single by Miguel Montero to take an 8–6 lead in the 10th. Rajai Davis would get a run back with an RBI single in the bottom half, but Michael Martinez grounded out to end the series in a golden pitch situation, allowing the Cubs to win the World Series for the first time since 1908. The Cubs became the first, and so far only team to complete the comeback by winning the Game 7 in extra innings. This was the second blown 3–1 lead for the Indians in franchise history.	CLE → CHC → CLE → CLE → CHC → CHC → CHC
2020 NLCS (Note: Played at a neutral site)	Los Angeles Dodgers	Atlanta Braves	Also trailed 2–0 in the series before an 11-run 1st inning for the Dodgers allowed them to win Game 3. In Game 5, the Braves led 2–0 and appeared to take a 3-run lead on a sac fly, however Marcell Ozuna left 3rd base too early and the run was negated. After cutting the lead to 1, Dodgers catcher Will Smith hit a 3-run homer off Braves reliever Will Smith to give the Dodgers a 4–2 lead, which they would hold, winning 7–3 and forcing a Game 6. After a 3–1 win to force a Game 7, the Dodgers once again trailed early in the game, however another baserunning error costed the Braves. With second and third and no outs in the 4th and a 3–2 lead, Nick Markakis hit into a 5–2–5–6 double play with both runners in scoring position being tagged out. In the top of the 5th, Mookie Betts robbed Freddie Freeman of a home run to keep the deficit at one. Kiké Hernández tied the game for the Dodgers with a home run in the 6th inning, and Cody Bellinger gave the Dodgers the lead for good in the 7th inning, and would also dislocate his shoulder in the celebration. The Dodgers bullpen retired the last six Braves hitters in the 8th and 9th innings, to complete the comeback. The Dodgers went on to win the World Series for the first time since 1988. The World Series was played at Globe Life Field due to the COVID-19 pandemic and the series had no off-days.	ATL → ATL → LAD → ATL → LAD → LAD → LAD

=== Unsuccessful comebacks ===
6 other MLB teams have evened the series after being down 3–1 (including 1 when trailing 3–0), only to lose Game 7.

Year and series	Series Loser	Series Winner	Note(s)	Pattern
1912 World Series	New York Giants	Boston Red Sox	An eighth game was played in Boston following a tie in Game 2 due to darkness. In Game 8, the Giants were leading 2–1 heading to the bottom of 10th inning. With 1 out, Tris Speaker hit a pop-up that fell untouched in between three Giants players. Speaker then took advantage by tying the game on an RBI single, before Larry Gardner hit a walk-off sac fly to win the World Series for the Red Sox, preventing the first 3–1 comeback in a best-of-7 series.	
1967 World Series	Boston Red Sox	St. Louis Cardinals	Cardinals won Game 7 in Boston in Bob Gibson's third complete game victory of the Series, limiting the Red Sox to just 3 hits. Of the five times the Cardinals have been forced into a game seven after leading a best-of-seven series 3–1, this is the only time they have been victorious in game seven.	
1972 World Series	Cincinnati Reds	Oakland Athletics	Reds trailed 4–3 in the 8th inning of Game 5, before scoring a run in both the 8th and 9th innings, with Pete Rose knocking in the game-winning run. In Game 7 the Athletics would narrowly defeat the Reds 3–2, after Rose to lined out to left field in a golden pitch situation. With the win, the Athletics became the first team ever to win two winner-take-all games in the same year in MLB postseason history.	
1992 NLCS	Pittsburgh Pirates	Atlanta Braves	In Games 5 and 6, the Pirates outscored the Braves 20–5. In Game 7, the Pirates entered the bottom of the 9th leading 2–0. While the Braves scored a run to make it 2–1, the Pirates were 1 out away from advancing to the World Series. But with 2 outs and the bases loaded, Francisco Cabrera hit a walk-off 2-run single to win the series, as the Braves defeated the Pirates in the NLCS in a Game 7 for the second straight year. This marks the only time in MLB history that a team was 1 out away from elimination, but instead won the series on that very at-bat.	
2008 ALCS	Boston Red Sox	Tampa Bay Rays	The Red Sox trailed 7–0 in the 7th inning of Game 5, but rallied for 4 runs in the 7th and 3 runs in the 8th inning to tie the game. Then, in the 9th, J. D. Drew hit a walk-off single to force a Game 6, completing the second-largest comeback in postseason history, after Game 4 of the 1929 World Series, and the largest comeback while facing elimination. The Red Sox won Game 6 by a score of 4–2, and led Game 7 early. But it was ultimately the Rays who ended up victorious, winning Game 7 by a score of 3–1, to advance to the World Series for the first time in franchise history.	
2020 ALCS	Houston Astros	Tampa Bay Rays	The Astros trailed 3–0 in the series. In Game 5, Carlos Correa hit a walk-off home run to force a Game 6, which they would win to become the second team in MLB history to force a Game 7 after trailing 3–0. However, in Game 7, the Rays took an early lead that they wouldn't relinquish. Series was played at Petco Park due to the COVID-19 pandemic and the series had no off-days.	

== National Basketball Association ==
=== Successful comebacks ===
NBA teams have overcome 3–1 deficits 15 times, only 1 of which occurred in the NBA Finals. The NBA is the only major North American sport with a best-of-7 playoff series where no team has overcome a 3–0 deficit. The most recent instance was accomplished by the Philadelphia 76ers and Detroit Pistons during the 2026 NBA playoffs. The Boston Celtics, Denver Nuggets, Detroit Pistons, and Houston Rockets are tied for the most 3–1 comebacks, with 2 each. The Orlando Magic, Los Angeles Clippers, Philadelphia 76ers, and Phoenix Suns, are tied for the most blown 3–1 leads, with 2 each.

Year and series	Series Winner	Series Loser	Note(s)	Pattern
1968 Eastern Division finals	Boston Celtics	Philadelphia 76ers	The Celtics won two games on the road from the 3–1 deficit, and also won the NBA Finals.	BOS → PHI → PHI → PHI → BOS → BOS → BOS
1970 Western Division semifinals	Los Angeles Lakers	Phoenix Suns	The Lakers later reached the NBA Finals, where they lost to the New York Knicks in seven games.	LAL → PHX → PHX → PHX → LAL → LAL → LAL
1979 Eastern Conference finals	Washington Bullets	San Antonio Spurs	Reached the NBA Finals, where they lost to Seattle SuperSonics in five games.	SAS → WSH → SAS → SAS → WSH → WSH → WSH
1981 Eastern Conference finals	Boston Celtics	Philadelphia 76ers	Went on to win the NBA Finals, won games five and six by two points each, and game seven by one point.	PHI → BOS → PHI → PHI → BOS → BOS → BOS
1995 Western Conference semifinals	Houston Rockets	Phoenix Suns	Trailed 2–0 in the series before rallying to win the series and eventually back-to-back NBA Finals, where they swept the Shaq-led Orlando Magic in four games; second time a team won two games on the road from the 3–1 deficit.	PHX → PHX → HOU → PHX → HOU → HOU → HOU
1997 Eastern Conference semifinals	Miami Heat	New York Knicks	A players' fight in game five resulted in the suspension of several key Knicks players, including Patrick Ewing, Allan Houston, and Charlie Ward for Game 6, and John Starks and Larry Johnson for game seven in Miami.	NYK → MIA → NYK → NYK → MIA → MIA → MIA
2003 Eastern Conference first round	Detroit Pistons	Orlando Magic	First year the first round expanded to a best-of-seven series.	ORL → DET → ORL → ORL → DET → DET → DET
2006 Western Conference first round	Phoenix Suns	Los Angeles Lakers	With the Lakers' comeback in 1970, this was the first time in NBA history where two franchises have overcome a 3–1 series deficit to win against one another.	PHX → LAL → LAL → LAL → PHX → PHX → PHX
2015 Western Conference semifinals	Houston Rockets	Los Angeles Clippers	Doc Rivers became first coach to blow multiple 3–1 leads after also coaching the Magic in 2003.	LAC → HOU → LAC → LAC → HOU → HOU → HOU
2016 Western Conference finals	Golden State Warriors	Oklahoma City Thunder	Leandro Barbosa became the first player to be part of multiple 3–1 comebacks after also playing for the Suns in 2006.	OKC → GSW → OKC → OKC → GSW → GSW → GSW
2016 NBA Finals	Cleveland Cavaliers	Golden State Warriors	Trailed 2–0 in the series before rallying to win the series. The first time a 3–1 deficit has been overcome in the NBA Finals; Golden State also had the NBA's best-ever regular season record of 73–9 and were considered heavy favorites to win the title; third time a team won two games on the road from the 3–1 deficit; the Warriors became first NBA team to overcome a 3–1 deficit and then blow a 3–1 lead in the same playoff year, matching what the 2003 Vancouver Canucks did in the NHL.	GSW → GSW → CLE → GSW → CLE → CLE → CLE
2020 Western Conference first round	Denver Nuggets	Utah Jazz	In Game 7, Nikola Jokić scored the go-ahead hook shot with 27.8 seconds remaining in regulation. Mike Conley Jr.'s potential series-winning three-pointer at the buzzer rimmed out.	DEN → UTA → UTA → UTA → DEN → DEN → DEN
2020 Western Conference semifinals	Denver Nuggets	Los Angeles Clippers	First NBA team to come back from 3–1 deficit back-to-back in a playoff run; fourth time a team won two games as the designated road team from the 3–1 deficit. Second blown 3–1 series lead in Clippers' franchise history and second such blown lead in five years; only the Philadelphia 76ers and Phoenix Suns have blown two 3–1 series leads (albeit in a much longer time period). Third such blown lead for head coach Doc Rivers.	LAC → DEN → LAC → LAC → DEN → DEN → DEN
2026 Eastern Conference first round	Philadelphia 76ers	Boston Celtics	The Philadelphia 76ers became the first 7th seed to overcome a 3–1 deficit, and it is the franchise’s first time overcoming a 3–1 deficit, as well as their first win over the Celtics in a playoff series since 1982; fifth time a team won two games on the road from the 3–1 deficit. With the Celtics' comebacks in 1968 and 1981, this was the second time in NBA history where two franchises have overcome a 3–1 series deficit to win against one another.	BOS → PHI → BOS → BOS → PHI → PHI → PHI
2026 Eastern Conference first round	Detroit Pistons	Orlando Magic	The Pistons overcame a 24-point deficit in the second half of Game 6. Conversely, the Magic only scored 19 points in the 2nd half of that game, including missing a playoff-record 23 straight field goals. It is the second time the Pistons overcame a 3–1 deficit against the Magic, the last being in 2003. Coincidentally, in both instances, the Pistons and Magic were the #1 and #8 seeds respectively, and both series had the same pattern. Additionally, this marked the first time in NBA history where two teams overcame 3–1 series deficits in the same round, matching what happened in the NHL in 2003.	ORL → DET → ORL → ORL → DET → DET → DET

=== Unsuccessful comebacks ===
23 other NBA teams have evened the series after being down 3–1 (including 4 when trailing 3–0), only to lose Game 7.

Year and series	Series Loser	Series Winner	Note(s)	Pattern
1951 NBA Finals	New York Knicks	Rochester Royals	The Knicks become the first team to force a seventh game after falling behind 3–0 in the series. It is the only championship for the franchise, now the Sacramento Kings.	
1966 Western Division finals	St. Louis Hawks	Los Angeles Lakers		
1966 NBA Finals	Los Angeles Lakers	Boston Celtics		
1971 Eastern Conference semifinals	Philadelphia 76ers	Baltimore Bullets		
1973 Eastern Conference finals	Boston Celtics	New York Knicks	The Knicks become the first team to avoid losing an NBA playoff series after squandering a 3–1 lead by winning the seventh game on the road. First game seven loss in Celtics history.	
1978 Western Conference semifinals	Milwaukee Bucks	Denver Nuggets	First NBA playoff series victory for the Nuggets.	
1979 Eastern Conference semifinals	Atlanta Hawks	Washington Bullets	Remains the most recent season the Bullets/Wizards franchise has advanced past this round of the playoffs.	
1979 Eastern Conference semifinals	Philadelphia 76ers	San Antonio Spurs	First NBA playoff series victory in Spurs history. San Antonio would again be forced to a seventh game after having a 3–1 series lead in the Conference Finals, but this time lost the seventh game.	
1981 Western Conference semifinals	Phoenix Suns	Kansas City Kings	The Kings became the first team in NBA playoff history seeded lower than fourth in the conference to eliminate the top-seeded team in the conference in the Conference Semifinals.	
1982 Eastern Conference finals	Boston Celtics	Philadelphia 76ers	The 76ers avoided losing a 3–1 series advantage to the Celtics for a third time (and a second time in as many years).	
1987 Eastern Conference semifinals	Milwaukee Bucks	Boston Celtics		
1994 Western Conference semifinals	Denver Nuggets	Utah Jazz	The Nuggets became the second NBA team to overcome a 3–0 series deficit to force a seventh game after becoming the first No. 8 seed to eliminate a No. 1 seed in the First Round.	
1995 Eastern Conference semifinals	New York Knicks	Indiana Pacers	Patrick Ewing's game-tying layup attempt at the buzzer just misses as the Pacers avenge their playoff series losses to the Knicks over the previous two seasons.	
1996 Western Conference finals	Utah Jazz	Seattle SuperSonics		
1997 Western Conference semifinals	Seattle SuperSonics	Houston Rockets	Houston avenges their playoff series loss against the SuperSonics in the previous year's Conference Semifinals.	
2000 Western Conference finals	Portland Trail Blazers	Los Angeles Lakers	Los Angeles overcomes a 15-point deficit with ten minutes remaining to come back in game seven while denying the Trail Blazers of a series comeback in the process.	
2003 Western Conference first round	Portland Trail Blazers	Dallas Mavericks	The Trail Blazers become the third NBA team to force a seventh game after falling behind 3–0 in the series.	
2006 Western Conference semifinals	San Antonio Spurs	Dallas Mavericks	The Mavericks become the first NBA team to deny the comeback by winning the seventh game in overtime.	
2012 Western Conference first round	Denver Nuggets	Los Angeles Lakers		
2012 Western Conference first round	Memphis Grizzlies	Los Angeles Clippers		
2013 Eastern Conference first round	Brooklyn Nets	Chicago Bulls		
2023 Eastern Conference finals	Boston Celtics	Miami Heat	Celtics became the first team to host a game seven after trailing 3–0 in a series.	
2025 Western Conference first round	Houston Rockets	Golden State Warriors		

== National Hockey League ==
=== Successful comebacks ===
NHL teams have overcome 3–1 deficits 32 times (including 4 when trailing 3–0), only one of which occurred in the Stanley Cup Final and only one in the semifinals round, two in total. The most recent instance was accomplished by the Florida Panthers during the 2023 Stanley Cup playoffs. The New York Rangers, Vancouver Canucks, and Montreal Canadiens are tied for the most 3–1 comebacks, with 3 each. The Washington Capitals have the most blown 3–1 leads, with 5.

Year and series	Series Winner	Series Loser	Note(s)	Pattern
1942 Stanley Cup Final	Toronto Maple Leafs	Detroit Red Wings	Only time in the Stanley Cup Finals; overcame 3–0 deficit.	DET → DET → DET → TOR → TOR → TOR → TOR
1975 Stanley Cup quarterfinals	New York Islanders	Pittsburgh Penguins	Overcame 3–0 deficit; won 8 games while facing elimination.	PIT → PIT → PIT → NYI → NYI → NYI → NYI
1987 Patrick Division semifinals	New York Islanders	Washington Capitals	First year the opening round was a seven-game series; game seven was the Easter Epic.	WSH → NYI → WSH → WSH → NYI → NYI → NYI
1987 Norris Division finals	Detroit Red Wings	Toronto Maple Leafs	Trailed 2–0 in the series before rallying to win the series.	TOR → TOR → DET → TOR → DET → DET → DET
1988 Patrick Division semifinals	Washington Capitals	Philadelphia Flyers	Capitals trailed 3–0 in game seven before completing the comeback in OT. Dale Hunter scored the series-winning goal.	PHI → WSH → PHI → PHI → WSH → WSH → WSH
1989 Smythe Division semifinals	Los Angeles Kings	Edmonton Oilers	Los Angeles dethroned the two-time defending champion Oilers in Wayne Gretzky's first season with LA following the trade between the two teams. As of 2026, this remains the most recent playoff season where the Kings eliminated the Oilers in the playoffs.	EDM → LAK → EDM → EDM → LAK → LAK → LAK
1990 Smythe Division semifinals	Edmonton Oilers	Winnipeg Jets	Went on to win the Stanley Cup.	WIN → EDM → WIN → WIN → EDM → EDM → EDM
1991 Norris Division semifinals	St. Louis Blues	Detroit Red Wings	St. Louis outscored Detroit 12–3 over the last three games.	DET → STL → DET → DET → STL → STL → STL
1992 Norris Division semifinals	Detroit Red Wings	Minnesota North Stars	Trailed 2–0 in the series before rallying to win the series.	MNS → MNS → DET → MNS → DET → DET → DET
1992 Smythe Division semifinals	Vancouver Canucks	Winnipeg Jets	Canucks won game five by six goals and games six and seven by five goals each.	WIN → VAN → WIN → WIN → VAN → VAN → VAN
1992 Patrick Division semifinals	Pittsburgh Penguins	Washington Capitals	Trailed 2–0 in the series before rallying to win the series and eventually the Stanley Cup.	WSH → WSH → PIT → WSH → PIT → PIT → PIT
1994 Western Conference quarterfinals	Vancouver Canucks	Calgary Flames	The final three games all required overtime (game seven needed 2OT). Pavel Bure scored the series-winning goal.	VAN → CGY → CGY → CGY → VAN → VAN → VAN
1995 Eastern Conference quarterfinals	Pittsburgh Penguins	Washington Capitals	Second time Washington has blown a 3–1 series lead to Pittsburgh.	WSH → PIT → WSH → WSH → PIT → PIT → PIT
1998 Western Conference quarterfinals	Edmonton Oilers	Colorado Avalanche	Curtis Joseph stopped 92/93 shots over the last three games.	EDM → COL → COL → COL → EDM → EDM → EDM
1999 Western Conference quarterfinals	St. Louis Blues	Phoenix Coyotes	Third blown 3–1 lead in franchise history; team relocated from Winnipeg in 1996.	STL → PHX → PHX → PHX → STL → STL → STL
2000 Eastern Conference finals	New Jersey Devils	Philadelphia Flyers	First time a 3–1 deficit was overcome in the conference finals and the second time overall after the second round following Toronto Maple Leafs reverse sweep in 1942. The Devils went on to win the Stanley Cup.	NJD → PHI → PHI → PHI → NJD → NJD → NJD
2003 Western Conference quarterfinals	Vancouver Canucks	St. Louis Blues	Third 3–1 deficit comeback in Canucks' franchise history.	STL → VAN → STL → STL → VAN → VAN → VAN
2003 Western Conference quarterfinals	Minnesota Wild	Colorado Avalanche	First playoff series in Minnesota Wild franchise history.	MIN → COL → COL → COL → MIN → MIN → MIN
2003 Western Conference semifinals	Minnesota Wild	Vancouver Canucks	The Wild became first NHL team to overcome two 3–1 deficits in a single playoff year; both teams overcame 3–1 deficits in the Conference Quarterfinals; the Canucks became the first NHL team to come back from a 3–1 deficit and then blow a 3–1 lead in the same playoff year.	VAN → MIN → VAN → VAN → MIN → MIN → MIN
2004 Eastern Conference quarterfinals	Montreal Canadiens	Boston Bruins	Trailed 2–0 in the series before rallying to win the series.	BOS → BOS → MTL → BOS → MTL → MTL → MTL
2009 Eastern Conference quarterfinals	Washington Capitals	New York Rangers	Trailed 2–0 in the series before rallying to win the series.	NYR → NYR → WSH → NYR → WSH → WSH → WSH
2010 Eastern Conference quarterfinals	Montreal Canadiens	Washington Capitals	Capitals' fourth blown 3–1 lead. This is the first time a Presidents' Trophy winner blew a 3–1 series lead.	MTL → WSH → WSH → WSH → MTL → MTL → MTL
2010 Eastern Conference semifinals	Philadelphia Flyers	Boston Bruins	Overcame a 3–0 deficit in the series and a 3–0 goals deficit in Game 7.	BOS → BOS → BOS → PHI → PHI → PHI → PHI
2011 Eastern Conference quarterfinals	Tampa Bay Lightning	Pittsburgh Penguins	Penguins' second blown 3–1 series lead.	PIT → TBL → PIT → PIT → TBL → TBL → TBL
2013 Western Conference semifinals	Chicago Blackhawks	Detroit Red Wings	Blackhawks went on to win the Stanley Cup. Red Wings' third blown 3–1 series lead.	CHI → DET → DET → DET → CHI → CHI → CHI
2014 Western Conference first round	Los Angeles Kings	San Jose Sharks	Overcame 3–0 deficit; went on to win the Stanley Cup.	SJS → SJS → SJS → LAK → LAK → LAK → LAK
2014 Eastern Conference second round	New York Rangers	Pittsburgh Penguins	Penguins' third blown 3–1 series lead.	NYR → PIT → PIT → PIT → NYR → NYR → NYR
2015 Eastern Conference second round	New York Rangers	Washington Capitals	Capitals' fifth blown 3–1 lead in franchise history. Rangers become first team to a overcome 3–1 series deficit to win a series in consecutive years.	WSH → NYR → WSH → WSH → NYR → NYR → NYR
2019 Western Conference first round	San Jose Sharks	Vegas Golden Knights	The Sharks punctuated their series comeback against the Golden Knights by coming back in game seven from a 3–0 third period deficit, highlighted by Barclay Goodrow's series-winning overtime goal. First blown 3–1 series lead in Golden Knights' franchise history.	SJS → VGK → VGK → VGK → SJS → SJS → SJS
2021 North Division first round	Montreal Canadiens	Toronto Maple Leafs	Third 3–1 deficit comeback in Canadiens' franchise history. The loss in game seven for Toronto marked its eighth straight loss in potential series-clinching games (this losing streak reached 11 before they finally won game 6 against the Tampa Bay Lightning in 2023), along with losing a winner-take-all game of a playoff series in four consecutive seasons. The Canadiens later reached the Stanley Cup Final, where they lost to the defending and eventual repeat champion Tampa Bay Lightning in five games.	MTL → TOR → TOR → TOR → MTL → MTL → MTL
2022 Eastern Conference first round	New York Rangers	Pittsburgh Penguins	Penguins' fourth blown 3–1 series lead. It was also the second time that the Penguins blew a 3–1 series lead to the Rangers, after 2014. The Rangers tie the Canadiens and Canucks for most successful 3–1 series comebacks, with three. Become the only team to accomplish the feat while trailing at some point in all three elimination games, including trailing by two goals in both games five & six.	PIT → NYR → PIT → PIT → NYR → NYR → NYR
2023 Eastern Conference first round	Florida Panthers	Boston Bruins	Bruins' third blown 3–1 series lead after winning the Presidents' Trophy. This occurred the same season the Bruins set the league record for most wins and points in a single regular season and the first time since 2019 that the Presidents' Trophy winner were defeated in the first round.	BOS → FLA → BOS → BOS → FLA → FLA → FLA

=== Unsuccessful comebacks ===
33 other NHL teams have evened the series after being down 3–1 (including 6 when trailing 3–0), only to lose Game 7.

Year and series	Series Loser	Series Winner	Note(s)	Pattern
1939 Stanley Cup semifinals	New York Rangers	Boston Bruins	This was also the first time a team forced a seventh game after falling behind 3–0 in the series. Mel Hill scored the series-winning goal in the third overtime for Boston in the second-longest game seven played in NHL history.	
1945 Stanley Cup Final	Detroit Red Wings	Toronto Maple Leafs	The Red Wings nearly turned the tables on the Maple Leafs after losing the 1942 Stanley Cup Final after squandering a 3–0 series lead after falling behind 3–0 in this series. However, Babe Pratt of the Maple Leafs scored the eventual series-winning goal with under eight minutes remaining in game seven. This was also the first game seven of a Cup Final in which the road team won.	
1954 Stanley Cup Final	Montreal Canadiens	Detroit Red Wings	Tony Leswick scores the series-winning goal in overtime.	
1968 Stanley Cup quarterfinals	Philadelphia Flyers	St. Louis Blues	The Flyers forced the seventh game with Andre Lacroix scoring the game-tying goal with 15 seconds remaining facing elimination in game six.	
1975 Stanley Cup semifinals	New York Islanders	Philadelphia Flyers	The Islanders nearly came back from a 3–0 deficit in consecutive playoff series winning eight elimination games in their first playoff appearance in franchise history. However, Rick MacLeish's hat trick in game seven proved to be the difference.	
1981 Stanley Cup quarterfinals	Philadelphia Flyers	Calgary Flames	The Flames scored three power play goals in the seventh game to advance to the Stanley Cup Semifinals in their first season since relocating from Atlanta.	
1984 Smythe Division finals	Calgary Flames	Edmonton Oilers	Edmonton eliminated Calgary in the Division Finals for the second consecutive season.	
1987 Patrick Division finals	New York Islanders	Philadelphia Flyers	The Islanders nearly overcame a 3–1 series deficit in consecutive playoff series following their comeback against Washington in the Patrick Division Semifinals. But in similarity to 1975, the Flyers won game seven.	
1987 Stanley Cup Final	Philadelphia Flyers	Edmonton Oilers	Edmonton newspapers planned victory parades ahead of game five. However, the Flyers overcame two-goal deficits in both games five and six.	
1991 Smythe Division semifinals	Calgary Flames	Edmonton Oilers	Calgary opened up a three-goal lead at home in the first period of game seven. Esa Tikkanen of Edmonton started and completed the comeback in game seven by scoring the series-winning goal in overtime to complete the hat trick become just the second team to win a seventh game after overcoming a three-goal deficit.	
1992 Adams Division semifinals	Buffalo Sabres	Boston Bruins	Dave Reid scored the series-winning goal for Boston with just over eight minutes remaining in game seven to close out Buffalo after being shutout in game five and surrendering nine goals in game six.	
1994 Stanley Cup Final	Vancouver Canucks	New York Rangers	Just like Edmonton did prior to game five of the 1987 Finals, New York set the date for a victory parade ahead of game five. The Rangers never trailed in game seven, winning their first Stanley Cup in 54 years and putting an end to the Curse of 1940.	
2000 Western Conference quarterfinals	St. Louis Blues	San Jose Sharks	Owen Nolan scored the eventual series-winning goal with just over ten seconds remaining in the opening period by blasting a shot from just inside the red line as San Jose eliminated the Presidents' Trophy winners.	
2001 Western Conference semifinals	Los Angeles Kings	Colorado Avalanche	After the Kings held the Avalanche scoreless for a stretch of 162:53 between games four to seven, the Avalanche finally broke through with five goals in game seven (including four goals in the third period). Chris Drury scored the series-winner just over three minutes into the third period to eliminate Los Angeles.	
2002 Western Conference quarterfinals	Los Angeles Kings	Colorado Avalanche	For the second consecutive year, Chris Drury scores the series-winning goal for Colorado.	
2003 Eastern Conference finals	Ottawa Senators	New Jersey Devils	Jamie Langenbrunner's two goals and Jeff Friesen's series-winner with just over two minutes remaining in game seven propels the Devils to their fourth Stanley Cup Final in nine years while not only avoiding becoming the record-breaking fourth team in the 2003 playoffs to lose a series after leading 3–1 but also avoiding becoming the third team in NHL history to lose a series from third round onwards after leading 3–1.	
2006 Stanley Cup Final	Edmonton Oilers	Carolina Hurricanes	The Oilers rallied to force a seventh game on the strength of Fernando Pisani's game-winners in games five and six (game five while shorthanded in overtime), and Jussi Markkanen's shutout in game six. However, Edmonton's Cinderella run as the West's eighth seed ended as Carolina never trailed in game seven and won their first Stanley Cup. Until the 2024 Stanley Cup Final (which also involved the Oilers coming back from a series deficit but losing game seven), this was the most recent Cup Final in which a team had forced a seventh game after trailing the series 3–1, and it was also the most recent Cup Final in which the seventh game was won on the home ice of the winning team.	
2007 Western Conference quarterfinals	Dallas Stars	Vancouver Canucks	Marty Turco holds Vancouver scoreless for 167:05 to rally Dallas in the series before Vancouver managed to break through with four goals in the final 25 minutes of game seven to advance.	
2008 Eastern Conference quarterfinals	Boston Bruins	Montreal Canadiens	Boston rallies against Montreal in the series primarily from scoring four goals in the third period in both games five and six. However, Montreal dominated game seven with them winning 5–0 to avoid the upset.	
2008 Eastern Conference quarterfinals	Washington Capitals	Philadelphia Flyers	Game seven went to overtime, where Joffrey Lupul scored for Philadelphia.	
2009 Eastern Conference semifinals	Boston Bruins	Carolina Hurricanes	Scott Walker scored the series-winning goal in overtime as Carolina won their fourth straight playoff series dating back to 2006 that lasted seven games.	
2011 Western Conference quarterfinals	Chicago Blackhawks	Vancouver Canucks	The defending champions were also behind 3–0 in the series before routing the Presidents' Trophy winners in games four and five to send the series back to Chicago where Ben Smith scored the overtime winner to force the seventh game. After trailing for much of game seven, Jonathan Toews tied the game shorthanded with just under two minutes left. Game seven also headed to overtime, where Chicago's comeback attempt failed when Alexandre Burrows took advantage of a Chris Campoli turnover to beat Corey Crawford.	
2011 Western Conference semifinals	Detroit Red Wings	San Jose Sharks	Detroit also forced a seventh game after falling behind 3–0 to make 2011 the only playoff year in which two different teams have forced a seventh game after trailing 3–0 in the series.	
2013 Eastern Conference quarterfinals	Toronto Maple Leafs	Boston Bruins	Boston prevented Toronto's series comeback attempt by coming back in game seven from a 4–1 third period deficit, which was punctuated by Patrice Bergeron's game-tying goal and series-winning overtime goal.	
2014 Western Conference Finals	Chicago Blackhawks	Los Angeles Kings	Like in 2011, the defending champion Blackhawks' comeback bid falls short in overtime as Alec Martinez's overtime goal rallies the Kings from a two-goal deficit in game seven.	
2016 Western Conference first round	Chicago Blackhawks	St. Louis Blues	Once again, the defending champion Blackhawks were thwarted from completing a series comeback when former Blackhawk Troy Brouwer scored the series-winning goal in the third period of game seven.	
2017 Eastern Conference second round	Washington Capitals	Pittsburgh Penguins	Bryan Rust scored the series-winning goal in Game 7 to eliminate the Presidents' Trophy winning Capitals for the second straight year.	
2018 Eastern Conference first round	Toronto Maple Leafs	Boston Bruins	Boston once again comes from behind in the third period to avoid blowing a 3–1 series lead as Jake DeBrusk scores the series-winner.	
2020 Western Conference second round	Colorado Avalanche	Dallas Stars	Joel Kiviranta scores a hat trick along with the series-winning goal in overtime.	
2020 Western Conference second round	Vancouver Canucks	Vegas Golden Knights	Shea Theodore scores the opening goal of the game with just over six minutes remaining in regulation which would turn out to be the series winner.	
2020 Eastern Conference second round	Philadelphia Flyers	New York Islanders	After winning games five and six in OT and 2OT respectively, the Flyers were shutout 4–0 by the Islanders throughout all of game seven. Scott Mayfield scored the opening goal of game seven for New York, which would stand as the series-winner. This game seven was the third time these two franchises have met in a seventh game with all three times where one team trailed 3–1 in the series, forcing a game seven, but subsequently losing it.	
2021 West Division first round	Minnesota Wild	Vegas Golden Knights	This was the third straight year in which Vegas held a 3–1 series advantage in a playoff series, only to be forced to a seventh game. However, Mattias Janmark's hat trick and Max Pacioretty's series-winning goal allow Vegas to win 6–2. This was the Wild's first game seven loss in franchise history.	
2024 Eastern Conference first round	Toronto Maple Leafs	Boston Bruins	This was the fourth consecutive series between the Bruins and Leafs to go to seven games, and second consecutive series which Boston held a 3–1 series lead, only to be forced to a game seven. Boston won game seven 2–1 in overtime. Had Boston blown their series lead, they would have been the first team across NHL, NBA, and MLB history to do so in consecutive years.	
2024 Stanley Cup Final	Edmonton Oilers	Florida Panthers	Trailed 3–0; Panthers won first Stanley Cup in franchise history.	

== See also ==
- List of teams that have overcome 3–0 series deficits
- List of teams that have overcome 2–0 series deficits in a best-of-five series
