= Reverse sweep =

Notable comebacks in playoff series in sports

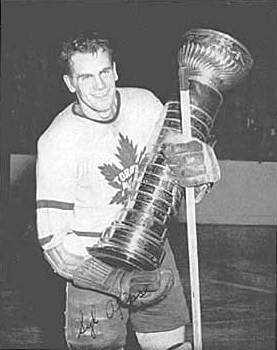
Syl Apps of the Toronto Maple Leafs after his team won game seven of the 1942 Stanley Cup Final, overcoming a 3–0 series deficit

A reverse sweep is a phenomenon in a sports playoff series where a team completes a sweep of the opposing team after themselves being one game or match away from being swept. In the most common instances, this refers to a team coming back from a 3–0 deficit in a best-of-seven series, or a 2–0 deficit in a best-of-five series, and winning the series.

Reverse sweeps, especially in a best-of-seven series, are extremely rare. In the three major professional sports leagues in the United States and Canada that hold playoff series, a reverse sweep in a seven-game series has only occurred five times: four times in the National Hockey League (NHL), one time in the Major League Baseball (MLB), and never in the National Basketball Association (NBA).

== Background ==
=== Best-of-seven series reverse sweeps ===
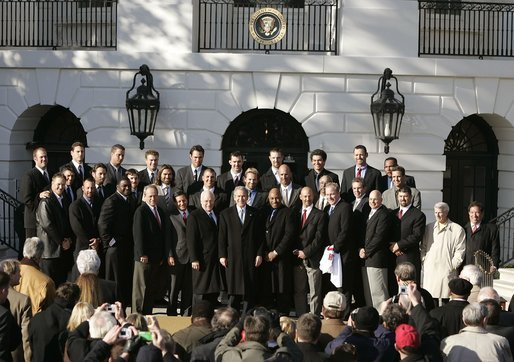
The 2004 Boston Red Sox, seen here at the White House, were the first MLB team to win a game seven after being down 3–0 in a series.

Three of the major professional sports leagues in the United States and Canada have playoff series that can reach a game seven: Major League Baseball (MLB), the National Basketball Association (NBA), and the National Hockey League (NHL). In MLB, only the League Championship Series and the World Series are best-of-seven series. In the NBA and NHL, all four rounds of their respective playoffs are best-of-seven series.

In the history of these leagues, teams that were down 3–0 in a series have come back to win the series five times; four times in the NHL and once in MLB. The most recent example is the Los Angeles Kings of the NHL in the 2014 Stanley Cup playoffs first round. The only instance in MLB to date was by the Boston Red Sox in the 2004 American League Championship Series. The only instance in a championship series was by the NHL's Toronto Maple Leafs in the 1942 Stanley Cup Final. The NBA is the only league in which this has never happened, to date.

Conversely, eleven teams have evened a series after being behind 3–0 and then lost in the final game: six in the NHL, four in the NBA, and one in MLB. The most recent example is the Edmonton Oilers of the NHL in the 2024 Stanley Cup Final.

No team has overcome multiple 3–0 deficits in a single postseason, although the 1974–75 New York Islanders of the NHL nearly did so; they successfully overcame a 3–0 series deficit in the 1975 Stanley Cup quarterfinals, then rallied from a 3–0 series deficit in the Stanley Cup semifinals before losing the seventh game.

While, traditionally, a best-of-seven series was only played in the final (championship) round of a postseason, MLB adopted a best-of-seven format in 1985 for the League Championship Series, the NHL followed suit for its first round in 1987, and the NBA did the same for its first round in 2003.

Outside of the noted major North American leagues, various other leagues across multiple sports also use seven-game postseason series. There are several known instances of teams in such leagues overcoming 3–0 series deficits.

=== Best-of-five series reverse sweeps ===
MLB, the NBA, and the NHL have had playoff series throughout their history that can reach a winner-take-all fifth game. Currently, however, only MLB is actively using a best-of-five series, with the best-of-five series that were used in the NHL and NBA being permanently expanded to best-of-seven series in 1987 and 2003, respectively. In the history of these leagues, teams that were down 2–0 in a series have come back to win the series 17 times; 11 times in MLB, 6 times in the NBA, and once in the NHL. The most recent instance was accomplished by the Cleveland Guardians of the MLB in the 2026 American League Division Series.

In women's North American professional sports, the Women's National Basketball Association (WNBA) has used the format for its Finals since 2005 and for the semifinals since 2016, but with no successful 2–0 deficit comebacks to date. The Professional Women's Hockey League (PHWL) has also used the format for its semifinals and Walter Cup Finals since its 2023–24 inaugural season, with one successful comeback: PWHL Minnesota in the 2024 Walter Cup Semifinals.

== List of teams that have overcome a 3–0 series deficit ==
=== Key ===
	Indicates the team that had home advantage
	Indicates series in the championship round
Eventual champion	Indicates the series winner won (or went on to win) the championship

The team that won the first three games is on the right, while the team that won the second three is on the left.

=== National Hockey League ===
In Stanley Cup Playoffs history, 211 teams faced a 3–0 deficit in a best-of-seven series. Of these teams, only four overcame the deficit (~2%). Only one overcame the deficit in the Stanley Cup Final. Three comebacks were completed with game seven away, while the 1942 Toronto Maple Leafs completed the comeback on home ice.

Year and series	Series Winner	Series Loser	Note(s)
1942 Stanley Cup Final	Toronto Maple Leafs	Detroit Red Wings	Only time in the Stanley Cup Final.
1975 Stanley Cup quarterfinals	New York Islanders	Pittsburgh Penguins	New York won a record eight games while facing elimination this playoff year.
2010 Eastern Conference semifinals	Philadelphia Flyers	Boston Bruins	Philadelphia also overcame a 3–0 goal deficit in the seventh game.
2014 Western Conference first round	Los Angeles Kings	San Jose Sharks	Los Angeles won three Game 7s in this playoff year and holds the record for most elimination games won in a single playoff year for a Stanley Cup champion, with seven. This was the second time that a team has overcome a 3–0 deficit and gone on to win the Stanley Cup.

=== Major League Baseball ===
One MLB team has overcome a 3–0 deficit to win the series.

Year and series	Series Winner	Series Loser	Note(s)
2004 American League Championship Series	Boston Red Sox	New York Yankees	The Red Sox were 3 outs away from being swept in Game 4. Trailing 4–3 in the bottom of the 9th, Kevin Millar walked to lead off the inning before being pinch ran for by Dave Roberts. Roberts stole second, and two pitches later, Bill Mueller tied the game with an RBI single to force extra innings. In the 12th inning, David Ortiz hit a walk-off 2-run home run to win the game 6–4 and force a Game 5. There, the Red Sox would once again trail late, down 4–2 in the bottom of the 8th. A home run by David Ortiz cut the deficit to 1, before Jason Varitek hit a sac fly to tie the game. The game would go deep into extra innings before David Ortiz played hero again, hitting a walk-off RBI single in the 14th inning to force a Game 6. Curt Schilling was the starter for the Red Sox in Game 6 and was playing with a torn tendon sheath in his right ankle. He went 7 innings, limiting the Yankees to just 1 run. The Red Sox won what would later be known as the "Bloody Sock Game" to force a Game 7, becoming the first MLB team to do so after trailing 3–0. The Red Sox dominated Game 7, going up 6–0 in the 2nd inning, thanks to a grand slam by Johnny Damon, and never looked back, winning 10–3. The Red Sox became the first team in MLB history to win a series after trailing 3–0. They went on to win the World Series for the first time since 1918, never having trailed a single time that series.

=== Other leagues ===
Outside of MLB, the NBA, and the NHL, there are some other known instances of successful comebacks from 3–0 series deficits. The Slovak ice hockey club HK Dukla Trenčín and the Swiss ice hockey club EV Zug are the only teams that managed to overcome a 3–0 deficit twice.

==== Baseball ====
Year and series	Series Winner	Series Loser	Sports league	Note(s)
1958 Japan Series	Nishitetsu Lions	Yomiuri Giants	Nippon Professional Baseball	Nishitetsu was 1 inning away from elimination in Game 5, but tied the game 3–3 in the bottom of the ninth inning to force extras.
1971 Serie del Rey	Jalisco Horsemen	Saltillo Saraperos	Mexican Baseball League	
1986 Japan Series	Seibu Lions	Hiroshima Toyo Carp	Nippon Professional Baseball	Game one ended in a tie after 14 innings. This series was the only time a Game 8 has been played in the Japan Series.
1989 Japan Series	Yomiuri Giants	Kintetsu Buffaloes	Nippon Professional Baseball	
2021 Serie del Rey	Tijuana Bulls	Yucatán Lions	Mexican Baseball League	Tijuana was 1 base away from elimination in Game 5, when Yucatán had the winning run at third base in the bottom of the ninth inning. However, Fernando Rodney struck out the next batter to send the game to extra innings, where Tijuana eventually won to extend the series.
2023 Mexican Baseball League Playoffs first round	Rojos del Águila de Veracruz	Pericos de Puebla	Mexican Baseball League	
2024 Mexican Baseball League South Zone Championship Series	Mexico Diablos	Oaxaca Warriors	Mexican Baseball League	

==== World Basketball ====
Note(s)
2015–16 PBA Philippine Cup Finals	San Miguel Beermen	Alaska Aces	Philippine Basketball Association	Games 4 and 5 of the comeback went to overtime.
2024-25 MNBA The League Semifinals	Bishrelt Metal	SG Apes	Mongolian National Basketball Association	Bishrelt Metal overcome 0-3 deficit in a tight scheduled 20 day span. They played in BCL twice during the playoff series.

==== Ice hockey ====
Year and series	Series Winner	Series Loser	Sports league	Note(s)
1960 AHL Calder Cup playoffs round 1	Rochester Americans	Cleveland Barons	American Hockey League	
1989 AHL Southern Division finals	Adirondack Red Wings	Hershey Bears	American Hockey League	Games five and seven of the comeback went to overtime.
1996 WHL first round	Spokane Chiefs	Portland Winter Hawks	Western Hockey League	
1999 IHL Eastern Conference finals	Orlando Solar Bears	Detroit Vipers	International Hockey League	
2001 QMJHL Dilio Conference Quarterfinals	Cape Breton Screaming Eagles	Chicoutimi Saguenéens	Quebec Major Junior Hockey League	
2006 Nationalliga A quarterfinals	Lugano	Ambri-Piotta	National League	
2007 Nationalliga A quarterfinals	Zug	Rapperswil-Jona	National League	
2008 National League A Quarterfinals	Davos	Zug	National League	
2008 Slovak Extraliga quarterfinals	Dukla Trenčín	Martin	Slovak Extraliga	
2010 ECHL American Conference finals	Cincinnati Cyclones	Reading Royals	ECHL	The only goal of game seven was scored by Cincinnati forward Barrett Ehgoetz 13:48 into the game.
2010 OHL Western Conference finals	Windsor Spitfires	Kitchener Rangers	Ontario Hockey League	
2010 CCHL East Division Semifinals	Wellington Dukes	Markham Waxers	Central Canadian Hockey League	
2011 Slovak Extraliga quarterfinals	Dukla Trenčín	Slovan Bratislava	Slovak Extraliga	
2012 Liiga quarterfinals	Espoo Blues	KalPa	Finnish Elite League	
2013 AHL Eastern Conference semifinals	Wilkes-Barre/Scranton Penguins	Providence Bruins	American Hockey League	
2013 WHL Western Conference quarterfinals	Kelowna Rockets	Seattle Thunderbirds	Western Hockey League	
2014 OHL Eastern Conference quarterfinals	Peterborough Petes	Kingston Frontenacs	Ontario Hockey League	
2015 KHL Western Conference Finals	SKA Saint Petersburg	CSKA Moscow	Kontinental Hockey League	
2015 QMJHL Quarterfinals	Val-d'Or Foreurs	Baie-Comeau Drakkar	Quebec Major Junior Hockey League	
2016 VHL first round	Dynamo Balashikha	Buran Voronezh	Supreme Hockey League	
2017 Latvian Premier League Hockey Championship Finals	HK Kurbads	HK MOGO	Latvian Premier League	
2018 ECHL Mountain Division Semifinals	Idaho Steelheads	Allen Americans	ECHL	
2019 OHL Western Conference semifinals	Guelph Storm	London Knights	Ontario Hockey League	
2019 BCHL playoffs	Chilliwack Chiefs	Langley Rivermen	British Columbia Hockey League	
2022 NL Quarterfinals	HC Davos	SC Rapperswil-Jona Lakers	National League	
2022 NL Finals	EV Zug	ZSC Lions	National League	
2023 WHL Eastern Conference semifinals	Saskatoon Blades	Red Deer Rebels	Western Hockey League	
2023–24 Czech Extraliga semifinals	Třinec	Sparta Praha	Czech Extraliga	Coincidentally, in the previous round, Třinec nearly blew a 3–0 lead of their own, before winning Game 7.
2025 VHL first round	Dynamo Saint-Petersburg	Buran Voronezh	All-Russian Hockey League	
2024–25 OHL Eastern Conference semifinals	Kitchener Rangers	Windsor Spitfires	Ontario Hockey League	The Kitchener Rangers had been defeated by the Windsor Spitfires in 2010 with a 3–0 comeback of their own.
2025-26 SHL quarterfinals	Rögle BK	Färjestad BK	Swedish Hockey League	Rögle BK is the first team in the SHL to have overcome a 3-0 series deficit.

== List of teams that have overcome 2–0 series deficits in a best-of-five series ==
=== Key ===
	Indicates the team that had home advantage
	Indicates series in the championship round
Eventual champion	Indicates the series winner won (or went on to win) the championship

The team that won the first three games is on the right, while the team that won the second three is on the left.

=== Major League Baseball ===
From 1969 to 1984, the League Championship Series was a best-of-five, until it was expanded to a best-of-seven in 1985. Since its inception in 1994 (and its one-off use in 1981), the League Division series has used the best-of-five format.

Year and series	Series Winner	Series Loser	Note(s)
1981 NLDS	Los Angeles Dodgers	Houston Astros	The 1981 Division Series was a one-off round that was created due to the 1981 Major League Baseball strike. Three of the four series this round included a team forcing a Game 5 after previously trailing 2–0 in the series, though this is the only one where the trailing team won Game 5. The Dodgers never trailed in Games 3 to 5, allowing only 2 runs the rest of the way, becoming the first team in MLB history to overcome a 2–0 deficit in a best-of-5 series. The Dodgers went on to win the World Series, after overcoming a 2–0 series deficit in the World Series, though that was in a best-of-7 series. The Dodgers won 5 elimination games en route to the title.
1982 ALCS	Milwaukee Brewers	California Angels	In Game 5, the Angels led 3–2 going into the 7th inning. Cecil Cooper hit a lead-changing 2-run single to give the Brewers a 4–3 lead. Marshall Edwards would rob Don Baylor of extra-bases in the 8th, which would be critical since he likely would've scored on a single by the very next batter. The Angels had the tying run at second in the 9th inning, but the Brewers were able to prevent him from scoring, and complete the comeback.
1984 NLCS	San Diego Padres	Chicago Cubs	
1995 ALDS	Seattle Mariners	New York Yankees	
1999 ALDS	Boston Red Sox	Cleveland Indians	
2001 ALDS	New York Yankees	Oakland Athletics	
2003 ALDS	Boston Red Sox	Oakland Athletics	
2012 NLDS	San Francisco Giants	Cincinnati Reds	
2015 ALDS	Toronto Blue Jays	Texas Rangers	
2017 ALDS	New York Yankees	Cleveland Indians	
2026 ALDS	Cleveland Guardians	Chicago White Sox	

=== National Basketball Association ===
The NBA used a best-of-five playoff from 1951 to 1953 and from 1955 to 1957 for the second round of the playoffs, before it was expanded to a best-of-seven starting in 1958. A best-of-five playoff was also used in the first round from 1961 to 1967 and from 1984 to 2002 before it was also expanded to a best-of-seven starting in 2003.

Six teams have overcome a 2–0 deficit in NBA playoff history.

Year and series	Series Winner	Series Loser	Note(s)
1956 Western Division finals	Fort Wayne Pistons	St. Louis Hawks	
1987 Western Conference first round	Golden State Warriors	Utah Jazz	
1990 Eastern Conference first round	New York Knicks	Boston Celtics	
1993 Western Conference first round	Phoenix Suns	Los Angeles Lakers	
1994 Western Conference first round	Denver Nuggets	Seattle SuperSonics	Denver became the first 8th seed to upset the 1st seed in NBA history.
2001 Western Conference first round	Dallas Mavericks	Utah Jazz	

=== National Hockey League ===
The Stanley Cup Final was played as a best-of-five in 1928 and again from 1931 to 1938. Also played as a best-of-five, was a Semi-Final series, which was contested between the top two seeds in the league from 1929 to 1938. From 1980 to 1986, the first round of the playoffs was played as a best-of-five until it was expanded to a best-of-seven starting with the 1987 playoffs. In 2020, the qualifying round was played as a best-of-five as part of the modified playoff format due to the COVID-19 pandemic.

Only one team has ever overcome a 2–0 deficit in NHL playoff history.

Year and series	Series Winner	Series Loser	Note(s)
1985 Patrick Division semifinals	New York Islanders	Washington Capitals	

=== Professional Women's Hockey League ===
The PWHL uses best-of-five series for the playoff semifinals and the Walter Cup Finals. In the PWHL's inaugural season, PWHL Minnesota overcame a 2–0 series deficit, winning three straight elimination games to defeat PWHL Toronto 3–2.

Year and series	Series Winner	Series Loser	Note(s)
2024 Walter Cup Semifinals	PWHL Minnesota	PWHL Toronto	

== See also ==
- List of teams that have overcome 3–1 series deficits
