= 2015–16 Hockeyettan season =

2015–16 Division 1 season
- League: Hockeyettan
- Sport: Ice hockey
- Duration: 20 September 2015 – 14 February 2016 (postseason 2 April)
- Number of teams: 48
- Promoted to HockeyAllsvenskan: Södertälje SK; Västerviks IK

Hockeyettan seasons
- ← 2014–15 2016–17 →

The 2015–16 Hockeyettan season is the second season that the third tier of ice hockey in Sweden has been organized under that name. The regular season began on 20 September 2015 and end on 14 February 2016, to be followed by promotion and relegation playoffs.

== Format ==
The clubs meet each team from their starting groups twice, home and away. The top four teams from each group form two new groups of eight. Teams 1–4 from Hockeyettan North and East form Allettan North, while teams 1–4 from Hockeyettan South and West form Allettan West. Each of these Allettan groups then plays an additional home-and-away series. Meanwhile, the remaining eight teams in each starting group play each other again in a continuation series.

The winner of each Allettan group qualifies directly for the 2016 HockeyAllsvenskan qualifiers. Teams 2–5 in the Allettan groups, along with teams 1–2 from the continuation groups, play a playoff to fill the remaining two spots in the HockeyAllsvenskan qualifiers. Teams 7–8 from the continuation groups are forced to re-qualify for Hockeyettan against teams from Division 2.

== Participating teams ==
Hockeyettan North	Hockeyettan East	Hockeyettan West	Hockeyettan South
AIK Hockey Härnsösand; Brunflo IK; Kalix UHC; Kiruna IF; Kovlands IF; Piteå HC; SK Lejon; Sollefteå HK; Tegs SK; Vännäs HC; Örnsköldsvik HF; Östersunds IK	Hammarby IF; Haninge Anchors IF; Huddinge IK; Hudiksvalls HC; IF Vallentuna BK; Sollentuna HC; Södertälje SK; Tierps HK; Visby/Roma HK; Väsby IK HK; Wings HC Arlanda; Åker/Strängnäs HC	Borlänge HF; Enköpings SK; Forshaga IF; Grästorps IK; IFK Arboga IK; Kumla HC Black Bulls; Köping HC; Lindlövens IF; Mariestad BoIS HC; Skövde IK; Surahammars IF; Tranås AIF	Halmstad HF; HC Dalen; Helsingborgs HC; IF Troja/Ljungby IF; Kallinge/Ronneby IF; Kristianstads IK; Mörrums GoIS IK; Nybro Vikings IF; Tyringe SoSS; Varberg HK; Vimmerby HC; Västerviks IK

== Autumn season ==
=== Hockeyettan North ===
Pos	Team	Pld	W	OTW	OTL	L	GF	GA	GD	Pts	Qualification
1	Östersunds IK	22	18	2	0	2	110	33	+77	58	Advance to Allettan North
2	Piteå HC	22	18	0	2	2	107	40	+67	56	Advance to Allettan North
3	Kiruna IF	22	15	3	1	3	97	44	+53	52	Advance to Allettan North
4	Kalix HC	22	13	1	2	6	78	47	+31	43	Advance to Allettan North
5	Örnsköldsvik HF	22	12	3	1	6	74	58	+16	43	Advance to Hockeyettan North (spring)
6	Sollefteå HK	22	8	2	1	11	57	71	−14	29	Advance to Hockeyettan North (spring)
7	SK Lejon	22	8	0	4	10	57	71	−14	28	Advance to Hockeyettan North (spring)
8	Vännäs HC	22	8	0	2	12	47	74	−27	26	Advance to Hockeyettan North (spring)
9	Tegs SK	22	7	1	1	13	69	81	−12	24	Advance to Hockeyettan North (spring)
10	Kovlands IshF	22	4	3	1	14	48	87	−39	19	Advance to Hockeyettan North (spring)
11	Brunflo IK	22	3	1	1	17	52	105	−53	12	Advance to Hockeyettan North (spring)
12	AIK Hockey Härnösand	22	2	0	0	20	40	125	−85	6	Advance to Hockeyettan North (spring)

=== Hockeyettan East ===
Pos	Team	Pld	W	OTW	OTL	L	GF	GA	GD	Pts	Qualification
1	Södertälje SK	22	19	0	0	3	115	37	+78	57	Advance to Allettan South
2	Visby/Roma HK	22	14	2	2	4	85	58	+27	48	Advance to Allettan South
3	Huddinge IK	22	13	3	1	5	91	52	+39	46	Advance to Allettan South
4	Hudiksvalls HC	22	11	4	2	5	85	51	+34	43	Advance to Allettan South
5	Åker/Strängnäs HC	22	8	4	1	9	86	79	+7	33	Advance to Hockeyettan East (spring)
6	Hammarby IF	22	9	1	4	8	73	75	−2	33	Advance to Hockeyettan East (spring)
7	IF Vallentuna BK	22	8	3	2	9	66	75	−9	32	Advance to Hockeyettan East (spring)
8	Haninge Anchors HC	22	7	3	4	8	77	77	0	31	Advance to Hockeyettan East (spring)
9	Väsby IK	22	6	2	3	11	60	69	−9	25	Advance to Hockeyettan East (spring)
10	Sollentuna HC	22	6	1	4	11	55	77	−22	24	Advance to Hockeyettan East (spring)
11	Wings HC Arlanda	22	6	0	2	14	63	92	−29	20	Advance to Hockeyettan East (spring)
12	Tierps HK	22	0	2	0	20	38	152	−114	4	Advance to Hockeyettan East (spring)

=== Hockeyettan West ===
Pos	Team	Pld	W	OTW	OTL	L	GF	GA	GD	Pts	Qualification
1	Borlänge HF	22	16	0	1	5	90	47	+43	49	Advance to Allettan North
2	Kumla HC	22	13	4	0	5	80	51	+29	47	Advance to Allettan North
3	Mariestad BoIS HC	22	14	2	1	5	73	55	+18	47	Advance to Allettan North
4	Tranås AIF	22	14	0	3	5	76	49	+27	45	Advance to Allettan North
5	Lindlövens IF	22	13	1	2	6	67	48	+19	43	Advance to Hockeyettan West (spring)
6	IFK Arboga IK	22	10	3	2	7	71	67	+4	38	Advance to Hockeyettan West (spring)
7	Skövde IK	22	11	1	2	8	74	66	+8	37	Advance to Hockeyettan West (spring)
8	Forshaga IF	22	7	2	3	10	60	71	−11	28	Advance to Hockeyettan West (spring)
9	Enköpings SK	22	7	2	0	13	68	92	−24	25	Advance to Hockeyettan West (spring)
10	Köping HC	22	4	1	1	16	49	90	−41	15	Advance to Hockeyettan West (spring)
11	Grästorps IK	22	3	2	1	16	48	74	−26	14	Advance to Hockeyettan West (spring)
12	Surahammars IF	22	2	0	2	18	45	91	−46	8	Advance to Hockeyettan West (spring)

=== Hockeyettan South ===
Pos	Team	Pld	W	OTW	OTL	L	GF	GA	GD	Pts	Qualification
1	Västerviks IK	22	16	4	1	1	97	42	+55	57	Advance to Allettan South
2	IF Troja/Ljungby	22	16	2	1	3	81	33	+48	53	Advance to Allettan South
3	Vimmerby HC	22	13	2	3	4	63	49	+14	46	Advance to Allettan South
4	Kallinge-Ronneby IF	22	12	2	2	6	79	55	+24	42	Advance to Allettan South
5	Kristianstads IK	22	12	1	3	6	84	65	+19	41	Advance to Hockeyettan South (spring)
6	HC Dalen	22	6	4	3	9	64	74	−10	29	Advance to Hockeyettan South (spring)
7	Halmstad HF	22	8	1	3	10	53	67	−14	29	Advance to Hockeyettan South (spring)
8	Helsingborgs HC	22	5	3	4	10	58	87	−29	25	Advance to Hockeyettan South (spring)
9	Tyringe SoSS	22	3	6	3	10	55	65	−10	24	Advance to Hockeyettan South (spring)
10	Nybro Vikings IF	22	6	1	1	14	56	85	−29	21	Advance to Hockeyettan South (spring)
11	Varberg HK	22	3	3	1	15	58	94	−36	16	Advance to Hockeyettan South (spring)
12	Mörrums GoIS IK	22	3	0	4	15	48	80	−32	13	Advance to Hockeyettan South (spring)

== Spring season ==
=== Allettan North ===
Pos	Team	Pld	W	OTW	OTL	L	GF	GA	GD	Pts	Qualification
1	Borlänge HF	14	8	3	0	3	42	28	+14	30	Advance to HockeyAllsvenskan qualifiers
2	Tranås AIF	14	7	0	6	1	51	42	+9	27	Advance to playoffs
3	Östersunds IK	14	7	1	2	4	44	34	+10	25	Advance to playoffs
4	Piteå HC	14	6	2	0	6	53	46	+7	22	Advance to playoffs
5	Kiruna IF	14	5	3	1	5	39	42	−3	22	Advance to playoffs
6	Mariestad BoIS HC	14	5	1	1	7	39	42	−3	18	
7	Kalix HC	14	3	1	2	8	38	58	−20	13	
8	Kumla HC	14	3	1	0	10	28	42	−14	11	

=== Allettan South ===
Pos	Team	Pld	W	OTW	OTL	L	GF	GA	GD	Pts	Qualification
1	Västerviks IK	14	11	1	0	2	49	25	+24	35	Advance to HockeyAllsvenskan qualifiers
2	Södertälje SK	14	9	1	1	3	46	33	+13	30	Advance to playoffs
3	IF Troja/Ljungby	14	6	2	3	3	42	38	+4	25	Advance to playoffs
4	Huddinge IK	14	6	3	0	5	38	30	+8	24	Advance to playoffs
5	Visby/Roma HK	14	6	1	1	6	39	41	−2	21	Advance to playoffs
6	Kallinge-Ronneby IF	14	5	1	2	6	39	39	0	19	
7	Vimmerby HC	14	2	1	0	11	34	54	−20	8	
8	Hudiksvalls HC	14	1	0	3	10	31	58	−27	6	

=== Hockeyettan North (spring) ===
Pos	Team	Pld	W	OTW	OTL	L	GF	GA	GD	Pts	Qualification
1	Örnsköldsvik HF	14	12	1	0	1	70	29	+41	45	Advance to playoffs
2	Vännäs HC	14	10	0	1	3	47	32	+15	35	Advance to playoffs
3	SK Lejon	14	7	1	1	5	54	46	+8	29	
4	Tegs SK	14	4	4	2	4	55	51	+4	25	
5	Sollefteå HK	14	5	1	1	7	53	46	+7	24	
6	Kovlands IshF	14	4	1	2	7	38	46	−8	18	
7	Brunflo IK	14	4	1	1	8	41	59	−18	16	Advance to Hockeyettan qualifiers
8	AIK Hockey Härnösand	14	0	1	2	11	29	78	−49	4	Advance to Hockeyettan qualifiers

=== Hockeyettan East (spring) ===
Pos	Team	Pld	W	OTW	OTL	L	GF	GA	GD	Pts	Qualification
1	Åker/Strängnäs HC	14	8	3	1	2	69	39	+30	38	Advance to playoffs
2	Hammarby IF	14	10	0	1	3	52	32	+20	37	Advance to playoffs
3	Haninge Anchors HC	14	8	2	2	2	56	34	+22	34	
4	Väsby IK	14	6	2	0	6	53	48	+5	25	
5	IF Vallentuna BK	14	5	1	1	7	43	39	+4	23	
6	Sollentuna HC	14	4	1	4	5	35	44	−9	20	
7	Wings HC Arlanda	14	3	3	3	5	41	42	−1	19	Advance to Hockeyettan qualifiers
8	Tierps HK	14	0	0	0	14	26	97	−71	0	Advance to Hockeyettan qualifiers

=== Hockeyettan West (spring) ===
Pos	Team	Pld	W	OTW	OTL	L	GF	GA	GD	Pts	Qualification
1	Lindlövens IF	14	9	2	1	2	55	28	+27	39	Advance to playoffs
2	Skövde IK	14	7	1	2	4	50	36	+14	30	Advance to playoffs
3	Enköpings SK	14	8	1	0	5	49	41	+8	29	
4	IFK Arboga IK	14	6	1	0	7	38	28	+10	26	
5	Forshaga IF	14	6	1	1	6	45	45	0	25	
6	Köping HC	14	4	3	0	7	34	54	−20	20	
7	Grästorps IK	14	5	0	3	6	37	47	−10	19	Advance to Hockeyettan qualifiers
8	Surahammars IF	14	2	0	2	10	30	59	−29	8	Advance to Hockeyettan qualifiers

=== Hockeyettan South (spring) ===
Pos	Team	Pld	W	OTW	OTL	L	GF	GA	GD	Pts	Qualification
1	Kristianstads IK	14	8	2	1	3	45	38	+7	36	Advance to playoffs
2	Halmstad HF	14	7	1	0	6	43	41	+2	28	Advance to playoffs
3	Tyringe SoSS	14	7	0	3	4	38	26	+12	27	
4	Nybro Vikings IF	14	6	3	0	5	42	36	+6	26	
5	HC Dalen	14	5	1	0	8	47	47	0	23	
6	Helsingborgs HC	14	5	0	3	6	43	51	−8	22	
7	Varberg HK	14	3	3	2	6	32	38	−6	18	Advance to Hockeyettan qualifiers
8	Mörrums GoIS IK	14	3	2	3	6	43	56	−13	16	Advance to Hockeyettan qualifiers

== Playoffs ==
=== Round 1 ===
==== Tranås 2–0 Skövde ====
Game log

February 18, 2016; 19:00	Skövde IK	3 – 5 (0–1, 2–2, 1–2)	Tranås AIF	Billingehov, Skövde; Attendance: 2,162

Game reference
12 min	Penalties	10 min
21	Shots	26

February 20, 2016; 16:00	Tranås AIF	4 – 1 (2–0, 1–0, 1–1)	Skövde IK	Stiga Arena, Tranås; Attendance: 979

Game reference
27 min	Penalties	41 min
40	Shots	17

==== Östersund 2–1 Vännäs ====
Game log

February 17, 2016; 19:00	Vännäs HC	4 – 3 (OT) (1–1, 0–1, 2–1, 1–0)	Östersunds IK	Vännäs Ishall, Vännäs; Attendance: 512

Game reference
24 min	Penalties	6 min
26	Shots	22

February 20, 2016; 16:00	Östersunds IK	8 – 1 (2–1, 3–0, 3–0)	Vännäs HC	Östersund Arena, Östersund; Attendance: 1,312

Game reference
8 min	Penalties	10 min
38	Shots	24

February 21, 2016; 16:00	Östersunds IK	5 – 0 (1–0, 1–0, 3–0)	Vännäs HC	Östersund Arena, Östersund; Attendance: 1,068

Game reference
16 min	Penalties	22 min
33	Shots	30

==== Piteå 2–1 Lindlöven ====
Game log

February 18, 2016; 19:00	Lindlövens IF	0 – 4 (0–0, 0–2, 0–2)	Piteå HC	Lindehov, Lindesberg; Attendance: 889

Game reference
8 min	Penalties	12 min
29	Shots	32

February 20, 2016; 16:00	Piteå HC	0 – 1 (0–1, 0–0, 0–0)	Lindlövens IF	LF Arena, Piteå; Attendance: 621

Game reference
6 min	Penalties	12 min
36	Shots	17

February 21, 2016; 16:00	Piteå HC	2 – 1 (OT) (0–0, 1–1, 0–0, 0–0, 1–0)	Lindlövens IF	LF Arena, Piteå; Attendance: 653

Game reference
8 min	Penalties	29 min
46	Shots	23

==== Kiruna 2–0 Örnsköldsvik ====
Game log

February 18, 2016; 19:00	Örnsköldsvik HF	2 – 3; 2–0, 0–3, 0–0	Kiruna IF	Skyttishallen, Örnsköldsvik; Attendance: 211

Game reference
8 min	Penalties	35 min
36	Shots	21

February 20, 2016; 16:00	Kiruna IF	5 – 3 (2–1, 3–0, 0–2)	Örnsköldsvik HF	Lombiahallen, Kiruna; Attendance: 1,023

Game reference
14 min	Penalties	20 min
43	Shots	35

==== Södertälje 2–0 Halmstad ====
Game log

February 18, 2016; 19:00	Halmstad HF	2 – 7; 1–2, 1–3, 0–2	Södertälje SK	Halmstad Arena, Halmstad; Attendance: 1,644

Game reference
4 min	Penalties	12 min
23	Shots	34

February 20, 2016; 16:00	Södertälje SK	8 – 0 (2–0, 2–0, 4–0)	Halmstad HF	Scaniarinken, Södertälje; Attendance: 3,470

Game reference
4 min	Penalties	24 min
39	Shots	29

==== Troja/Ljungby 2–0 Hammarby ====
Game log

February 18, 2016; 19:00	Hammarby IF	0 – 5 (0–2, 0–1, 0–2)	IF Troja/Ljungby	LW Hallen, Stockholm; Attendance: 500

Game reference
22 min	Penalties	6 min
19	Shots	30

February 20, 2016; 16:00	IF Troja/Ljungby	3 – 2 (0–0, 2–0, 1–2)	Hammarby IF	Ljungby Arena, Ljungby; Attendance: 1,883

Game reference
6 min	Penalties	12 min
33	Shots	15

==== Huddinge 1–2 Kristianstad ====
Game log

February 18, 2016; 19:00	Kristianstads IK	8 – 4 (7–2, 1–1, 0–1)	Huddinge IK	Kristianstads Ishall, Kristianstad; Attendance: 1,039

Game reference
35 min	Penalties	12 min
29	Shots	28

February 20, 2016; 16:00	Huddinge IK	3 – 2 (OT) (1–0, 0–1, 1–1, 1–0)	Kristianstads IK	Björkängshallen, Huddinge; Attendance: 440

Game reference
8 min	Penalties	4 min
17	Shots	32

February 21, 2016; 16:00	Huddinge IK	2 – 3 (1–0, 1–2, 0–1)	Kristianstads IK	Björkängshallen, Huddinge; Attendance: 649

Game reference
6 min	Penalties	6 min
19	Shots	33

==== Visby/Roma 2–0 Åker/Strängnäs ====
Game log

February 18, 2016; 19:00	Åker/Strängnäs HC	1 – 4 (1–1, 0–2, 0–1)	Visby/Roma HK	Åkers Ishall, Åker; Attendance: 429

Game reference
6 min	Penalties	8 min
23	Shots	28

February 20, 2016; 16:00	Visby/Roma HK	3 – 2 (OT) (0–0, 0–0, 2–2, 1–0)	Åker/Strängnäs HC	Visby Ishall, Visby; Attendance: 1,139

Game reference
6 min	Penalties	40 min
41	Shots	36

=== Round 2 ===
==== Östersund 1–2 Kristianstad ====
Game log

February 25, 2016; 19:00	Kristianstads IK	5 – 1 (2–1, 1–0, 2–0)	Östersunds IK	Kristianstads Ishall, Kristianstad; Attendance: 1,353

Game reference
14 min	Penalties	18 min
35	Shots	24

February 27, 2016; 16:00	Östersunds IK	5 – 3 (1–0,1–3, 3–0)	Kristianstads IK	Östersund Arena, Östersund; Attendance: 1,357

Game reference
6 min	Penalties	12 min
27	Shots	33

February 28, 2016; 16:00	Östersunds IK	1 – 2 (0–0, 1–2, 0–0)	Kristianstads IK	Östersund Arena, Östersund; Attendance: 1,652

Game reference
18 min	Penalties	10 min
22	Shots	42

==== Södertälje 2–1 Piteå ====
Game log

February 25, 2016; 19:00	Piteå HC	6 – 2 (3–0, 1–0, 2–2)	Södertälje SK	LF Arena, Piteå; Attendance: 1,342

Game reference
18 min	Penalties	10 min
23	Shots	23

February 27, 2016; 16:00	Södertälje SK	5 – 4 (OT) (2–0, 2–0, 0–4, 1–0)	Piteå HC	Scaniarinken, Södertälje; Attendance: 2,917

58 min	Penalties	29 min
34	Shots	22

February 28, 2016; 16:00	Södertälje SK	2 – 0 (1–0, 1–0, 0–0)	Piteå HC	Scaniarinken, Södertälje; Attendance: 2,450

Game reference
2 min	Penalties	31 min
33	Shots	16

==== Tranås AIF 0–2 Visby/Roma ====
Game log

February 25, 2016; 19:00	Visby/Roma HK	4 – 1 (0–1, 3–0, 1–0)	Tranås AIF	Visby Ishall, Visby; Attendance: 1,378

Game reference
6 min	Penalties	8 min
32	Shots	27

February 27, 2016; 16:00	Tranås AIF	1 – 4 (1–0, 0–2, 0–2)	Visby/Roma HK	Stiga Arena, Tranås; Attendance: 1,005

Game reference
22 min	Penalties	12 min
37	Shots	26

==== Troja/Ljungby 2–0 Kiruna ====
Game log

February 25, 2016; 19:00	Kiruna IF	3 – 4 (0–1, 2–2, 1–1)	IF Troja/Ljungby	Lombiahallen, Kiruna; Attendance: 1,874

Game reference
18 min	Penalties	29 min
28	Shots	24

February 27, 2016; 16:00	IF Troja/Ljungby	5 – 0 (1–0, 3–0, 1–0)	Kiruna IF	Ljungby Arena, Ljungby; Attendance: 1,844

Game reference
8 min	Penalties	20 min
43	Shots	33

=== Round 3 ===
==== Södertälje – Kristianstad ====
Game log

March 2, 2016; 19:00	Kristianstads IK	6 – 3 (2–2, 2–0, 2–1)	Södertälje SK	Kristianstads Ishall, Kristianstad; Attendance: 2,052

Game reference
6 min	Penalties	8 min
28	Shots	32

March 4, 2016; 16:00	Södertälje SK	3 – 2 (0–0, 3–1, 0–1)	Kristianstads IK	Scaniarinken, Södertälje; Attendance: 3,063

Game reference
6 min	Penalties	8 min
36	Shots	36

March 5, 2016; 16:00	Södertälje SK	6 – 2 (2–0, 2–1, 2–1)	Kristianstads IK	Scaniarinken, Södertälje; Attendance: 3,490

Game reference
8 min	Penalties	6 min
31	Shots	33

==== IF Troja/Ljungby – Visby/Roma HK ====
Game log

March 2, 2016; 19:00	Visby/Roma HK	2 – 3 (OT) (1–0, 0–0, 1–1, 0–1)	IF Troja/Ljungby	Visby Ishall, Visby; Attendance: 1,821

Game reference
22 min	Penalties	8 min
24	Shots	26

March 4, 2016; 16:00	IF Troja/Ljungby	2 – 1 (0–0, 0–0, 2–1)	Visby/Roma HK	Ljungby Arena, Ljungby; Attendance: 1,925

Game reference
27 min	Penalties	33 min
44	Shots	18

== HockeyAllsvenskan qualifiers ==
Pos	Team	Pld	W	OTW	OTL	L	GF	GA	GD	Pts	Qualification
1	Södertälje SK (P)	10	6	2	0	2	39	24	+15	22	Qualify for the 2016–17 HockeyAllsvenskan season
2	Västerviks IK (P)	10	6	1	2	1	34	23	+11	22	Qualify for the 2016–17 HockeyAllsvenskan season
3	IF Troja/Ljungby	10	4	1	1	4	38	30	+8	15	Qualify for the 2016–17 Hockeyettan season
4	IF Sundsvall (R)	10	3	1	2	4	23	29	−6	13	Qualify for the 2016–17 Hockeyettan season
5	Asplöven HC (R)	10	3	1	1	5	35	35	0	12	Qualify for the 2016–17 Hockeyettan season
6	Borlänge HF	10	2	0	0	8	20	48	−28	6	Qualify for the 2016–17 Hockeyettan season

(P) Promoted; (R) Relegated

== Hockeyettan qualifiers ==
Each qualifying group pitted the two last teams from each spring series against challengers from Division 2. The teams met in a double round-robin tournament. Only the first place team automatically qualified for play in the 2016–17 Hockeyettan season. The Swedish Ice Hockey Association then selected second and third placed teams from the qualifying groups for play in Hockeyettan on a geographical basis, to ensure the geographical distribution of the teams in the four groups for the following season.

=== North ===
Pos	Team	Pld	W	OTW	OTL	L	GF	GA	GD	Pts	Qualification
1	Brunflo IK	6	5	0	0	1	27	13	+14	15	Qualify for the 2016–17 Hockeyettan season
2	AIK-Hockey Härnösand (R)	6	3	1	0	2	23	12	+11	11	Qualify for the 2016–17 Division 2 season
3	Bodens HF	6	2	0	0	4	15	26	−11	6	Qualify for the 2016–17 Division 2 season
4	Överkalix IF	6	1	0	1	4	13	27	−14	4	Qualify for the 2016–17 Division 2 season

(R) Relegated

=== East ===
Pos	Team	Pld	W	OTW	OTL	L	GF	GA	GD	Pts	Qualification
1	Nacka HK	10	10	0	0	0	50	27	+23	30	Qualify for the 2016–17 Hockeyettan season
2	Wings HC Arlanda	10	6	1	0	3	40	26	+14	20	Selected for play in the 2016–17 Hockeyettan season to maintain group geography
3	IFK Tumba IK (P)	10	6	0	1	3	38	28	+10	19	Selected for play in the 2016–17 Hockeyettan season to maintain group geography
4	Tierps HK (R)	10	4	0	0	6	25	32	−7	12	Qualify for the 2016–17 Division 2 season
5	Rimbo IF	10	1	1	0	8	27	42	−15	5	Qualify for the 2016–17 Division 2 season
6	Bålsta HC	10	1	0	1	8	21	46	−25	4	Qualify for the 2016–17 Division 2 season

(P) Promoted; (R) Relegated

=== West ===
Pos	Team	Pld	W	OTW	OTL	L	GF	GA	GD	Pts	Qualification
1	Surahammars IF	10	7	1	2	0	46	22	+24	25	Qualify for the 2016–17 Hockeyettan season
2	Grästorps IK	10	5	1	4	0	45	33	+12	21	Selected for play in the 2016–17 Hockeyettan season to maintain group geography
3	Valbo HC (P)	10	3	3	1	3	36	35	+1	16	Selected for play in the 2016–17 Hockeyettan season to maintain group geography
4	Grums IK	10	2	2	0	6	27	31	−4	10	Qualify for the 2016–17 Division 2 season
5	IFK Munkfors	10	2	1	2	5	28	53	−25	10	Qualify for the 2016–17 Division 2 season
6	Avesta BK	10	2	1	0	7	37	45	−8	8	Qualify for the 2016–17 Division 2 season

(P) Promoted

=== South ===
Pos	Team	Pld	W	OTW	OTL	L	GF	GA	GD	Pts	Qualification
1	Varberg HK	10	7	2	1	0	36	16	+20	26	Qualify for the 2016–17 Hockeyettan season
2	Hanhals IF (P)	10	4	2	2	2	40	29	+11	18	Selected for play in the 2016–17 Hockeyettan season to maintain group geography
3	Olofströms IK	10	4	1	1	4	26	30	−4	15	Qualify for the 2016–17 Division 2 season
4	Mjölby HC	10	4	0	0	6	28	41	−13	12	Qualify for the 2016–17 Division 2 season
5	Bäcken HC	10	2	1	2	5	24	36	−12	10	Qualify for the 2016–17 Division 2 season
6	Mörrums GoIS IK (R)	10	3	0	0	7	36	38	−2	9	Qualify for the 2016–17 Division 2 season

(P) Promoted; (R) Relegated
