= 2016–17 Hockeyettan season =

- League: Hockeyettan
- Sport: Ice hockey
- Duration: 16 September 2016 – 19 February 2017
- Teams: 47
- Promoted to HockeyAllsvenskan: IF Troja/Ljungby
- Relegated to Division 2: Åker/Strängnäs HC; Brunflo IK; Haninge Anchors HC*; IFK Tumba IK; *For financial reasons

Hockeyettan seasons
- 2015–16 2017–18

The 2016–17 Hockeyettan season is the third season that the third tier of ice hockey in Sweden has been organized under that name. The regular season began on 16 September 2016 and ended on 19 February 2017, to be followed by promotion and relegation playoffs. The league was left with 47 teams after Kovlands IshF withdrew to a lower division due to financial reasons.

== Participating teams ==
Hockeyettan North	Hockeyettan South	Hockeyettan West	Hockeyettan East
Asplöven HC; Brunflo IK; IF Sundsvall; Kalix HC; Kiruna IF; Örnsköldsvik HF; Östersunds IK; Piteå HC; SK Lejon; Sollefteå HK; Tegs SK; Vännäs HC	HC Dalen; Halmstad HF; Hanhals IF; Helsingsborgs HC; IF Troja/Ljungby; Nybro Vikings IF; Kallinge-Ronneby IF; Kristianstads IK; Tranås AIF; Tyringe SoSS; Vimmerby HC	Åker/Strängnäs HC; Borlänge HF; Enköpings SK HK; Forshaga IF; Grästorps IK; IFK Arboga; Köping HC; Kumla HC; Lindlövens IF; Mariestad BoIS; Skövde IK; Surhammars IF	Hammarby IF; Haninge Anchors HC; Hudiksvalls HC; Huddinge IK; IF Vallentuna BK; IFK Tumba IK; Nacka HK; Sollentuna HC; Valbo HC; Väsby IK; Visby/Roma HK; Wings HC Arlanda

== Autumn season ==
=== Hockeyettan North ===
Pos	Team	Pld	W	OTW	OTL	L	GF	GA	GD	Pts	Qualification
1	Östersunds IK	22	17	0	0	5	92	37	+55	51	Advance to Allettan North
2	Piteå HC	22	14	4	1	3	82	42	+40	51	Advance to Allettan North
3	IF Sundsvall	22	16	1	0	5	93	37	+56	50	Advance to Allettan North
4	Asplöven HC	22	15	2	0	5	98	47	+51	49	Advance to Allettan North
5	Kalix HC	22	12	2	4	4	57	50	+7	44	Advance to Allettan North
6	Örnsköldsvik HF	22	12	2	1	7	91	60	+31	41	Advance to Hockeyettan North (spring)
7	Kiruna IF	22	9	1	2	10	79	63	+16	31	Advance to Hockeyettan North (spring)
8	Vännäs HC	22	5	2	1	14	47	93	−46	20	Advance to Hockeyettan North (spring)
9	Brunflo IK	22	5	1	2	14	45	95	−50	19	Advance to Hockeyettan North (spring)
10	Tegs SK	22	4	1	4	13	45	86	−41	18	Advance to Hockeyettan North (spring)
11	Sollefteå HK	22	3	1	1	17	45	106	−61	12	Advance to Hockeyettan North (spring)
12	SK Lejon	22	1	2	3	16	44	102	−58	10	Advance to Hockeyettan North (spring)

=== Hockeyettan South ===
Pos	Team	Pld	W	OTW	OTL	L	GF	GA	GD	Pts	Qualification
1	IF Troja/Ljungby	20	14	3	0	3	83	44	+39	48	Advance to Allettan South
2	Kristianstads IK	20	14	2	1	3	61	35	+26	47	Advance to Allettan South
3	Vimmerby HC	20	10	1	3	6	64	56	+8	35	Advance to Allettan South
4	Nybro Vikings IF	20	10	1	3	6	58	51	+7	35	Advance to Allettan South
5	Kallinge-Ronneby IF	20	10	1	2	7	60	49	+11	34	Advance to Allettan South
6	Tranås AIF	20	9	3	0	8	59	56	+3	33	Advance to Hockeyettan South (spring)
7	Helsingborgs HC	20	6	2	1	11	52	62	−10	23	Advance to Hockeyettan South (spring)
8	HC Dalen	20	7	0	2	11	43	67	−24	23	Advance to Hockeyettan South (spring)
9	Tyringe SoSS	20	4	3	2	11	53	68	−15	20	Advance to Hockeyettan South (spring)
10	Hanhals IF	20	4	2	2	12	48	64	−16	18	Advance to Hockeyettan South (spring)
11	Halmstad HF	20	3	1	3	13	40	69	−29	14	Advance to Hockeyettan South (spring)

=== Hockeyettan West ===
Pos	Team	Pld	W	OTW	OTL	L	GF	GA	GD	Pts	Qualification
1	Borlänge HF	22	18	1	1	2	101	43	+58	57	Advance to Allettan South
2	Mariestad BoIS	22	14	3	0	5	102	42	+60	48	Advance to Allettan South
3	Lindlövens IF	22	14	2	0	6	76	51	+25	46	Advance to Allettan South
4	Skövde IK	22	11	2	3	6	72	64	+8	40	Advance to Allettan South
5	Kumla HC	22	12	1	1	8	68	51	+17	39	Advance to Allettan South
6	Grästorps IK	22	10	2	2	8	65	50	+15	36	Advance to Hockeyettan West (spring)
7	IFK Arboga	22	9	0	4	9	69	60	+9	31	Advance to Hockeyettan West (spring)
8	Köping HC	22	10	0	1	11	51	68	−17	31	Advance to Hockeyettan West (spring)
9	Enköpings SK	22	8	3	0	11	54	69	−15	30	Advance to Hockeyettan West (spring)
10	Forshaga IF	22	8	0	1	13	56	63	−7	25	Advance to Hockeyettan West (spring)
11	Åker/Strängnäs HC	22	2	0	1	19	36	119	−83	7	Advance to Hockeyettan West (spring)
12	Surahammars IF	22	2	0	0	20	36	106	−70	6	Advance to Hockeyettan West (spring)

=== Hockeyettan East ===
Pos	Team	Pld	W	OTW	OTL	L	GF	GA	GD	Pts	Qualification
1	Huddinge IK	22	20	0	0	2	111	37	+74	60	Advance to Allettan North
2	Visby/Roma HK	22	15	1	1	5	77	46	+31	48	Advance to Allettan North
3	Hudiksvalls HC	22	15	0	0	7	93	51	+42	45	Advance to Allettan North
4	Väsby IK	22	14	1	0	7	71	50	+21	44	Advance to Allettan North
5	Haninge Anchors HC	22	10	4	3	5	71	63	+8	41	Advance to Allettan North
6	Hammarby IF	22	11	2	1	8	74	69	+5	38	Advance to Hockeyettan East (spring)
7	Sollentuna HC	22	11	1	2	8	72	64	+8	37	Advance to Hockeyettan East (spring)
8	Wings HC Arlanda	22	7	2	1	12	55	80	−25	26	Advance to Hockeyettan East (spring)
9	IF Vallentuna BK	22	6	1	2	13	56	63	−7	22	Advance to Hockeyettan East (spring)
10	Valbo HC	22	3	1	3	15	45	87	−42	14	Advance to Hockeyettan East (spring)
11	Nacka HK	22	4	0	0	18	47	89	−42	12	Advance to Hockeyettan East (spring)
12	IFK Tumba	22	3	0	0	19	36	109	−73	9	Advance to Hockeyettan East (spring)

== Spring season ==
=== Allettan North ===
Pos	Team	Pld	W	OTW	OTL	L	GF	GA	GD	Pts	Qualification
1	Huddinge IK	18	10	3	2	3	67	40	+27	38	Advance to Hockeyettan Finals
2	Visby/Roma HK	18	9	4	3	2	59	44	+15	38	Advance to round 2
3	IF Sundsvall	18	8	5	1	4	53	35	+18	35	Advance to round 2
4	Väsby IK	18	9	0	4	5	70	60	+10	31	Advance to round 1
5	Piteå HC	18	7	2	3	6	56	47	+9	28	Advance to round 1
6	Hudiksvalls HC	18	5	3	3	7	48	55	−7	24	Advance to round 1
7	Asplöven HC	18	6	1	2	9	51	66	−15	22	Advance to round 1
8	Kalix HC	18	4	3	1	10	43	54	−11	19	Advance to round 1
9	Östersunds IK	18	4	2	3	9	45	66	−21	19	
10	Haninge Anchors HC	18	4	1	2	11	49	74	−25	16	

=== Allettan South ===
Pos	Team	Pld	W	OTW	OTL	L	GF	GA	GD	Pts	Qualification
1	IF Troja/Ljungby	18	13	2	1	2	79	30	+49	44	Advance to Hockeyettan Finals
2	Kristianstads IK	18	12	3	1	2	78	35	+43	43	Advance to round 2
3	Mariestad BoIS HC	18	10	0	2	6	48	42	+6	32	Advance to round 2
4	Vimmerby HC	18	8	2	0	8	53	54	−1	28	Advance to round 1
5	Kallinge-Ronneby IF	18	8	0	4	6	43	45	−2	28	Advance to round 1
6	Nybro Vikings IF	18	7	1	4	6	37	43	−6	27	Advance to round 1
7	Skövde IK	18	6	3	0	9	47	60	−13	24	Advance to round 1
8	Borlänge HF	18	6	1	1	10	46	54	−8	21	Advance to round 1
9	Lindlövens IF	18	4	1	1	12	39	67	−28	15	
10	Kumla HC Black Bulls	18	0	3	2	13	33	73	−40	8	

=== Hockeyettan North (spring) ===
Pos	Team	Pld	W	OTW	OTL	L	GF	GA	GD	Pts	Qualification
1	Örnsköldsvik HF	12	9	0	0	3	54	21	+33	33	Advance to playoffs
2	Kiruna IF	12	7	1	1	3	46	28	+18	29	
3	Tegs SK	12	5	3	0	4	31	33	−2	23	
4	SK Lejon	12	6	1	1	4	35	31	+4	21	
5	Vännäs HC	12	4	0	1	7	33	43	−10	17	
6	Sollefteå HK	12	3	1	3	5	27	41	−14	15	Proceed to Hockeyettan qualifiers
7	Brunflo IK	12	0	2	2	8	21	50	−29	9	Proceed to Hockeyettan qualifiers

=== Hockeyettan South (spring) ===
Pos	Team	Pld	W	OTW	OTL	L	GF	GA	GD	Pts	Qualification
1	Tranås AIF	15	5	4	1	5	33	44	−11	30	Advance to playoffs
2	Tyringe SoSS	15	7	0	4	4	41	35	+6	28	
3	Helsingborgs HC	15	5	3	2	5	47	43	+4	28	
4	Hanhals IF	15	6	2	1	6	50	47	+3	25	
5	HC Dalen	15	6	1	1	7	37	39	−2	25	
6	Halmstad HF	15	5	1	2	7	46	46	0	20	Proceed to Hockeyettan qualifiers

=== Hockeyettan West (spring) ===
Pos	Team	Pld	W	OTW	OTL	L	GF	GA	GD	Pts	Qualification
1	Grästorps IK	12	8	0	2	2	36	24	+12	32	Advance to playoffs
2	Enköpings SK	12	6	2	2	2	52	33	+19	27	
3	Köping HC	12	4	3	2	3	39	28	+11	24	
4	IFK Arboga IK	12	5	0	1	6	31	30	+1	21	
5	Forshaga IF	12	5	0	0	7	21	34	−13	17	
6	Åker/Strängnäs HC	12	3	3	0	6	41	44	−3	16	Proceed to Hockeyettan qualifiers
7	Surahammars IF	12	3	0	1	8	22	49	−27	10	Proceed to Hockeyettan qualifiers

=== Hockeyettan East (spring) ===
Pos	Team	Pld	W	OTW	OTL	L	GF	GA	GD	Pts	Qualification
1	Sollentuna HC	12	7	1	1	3	45	33	+12	29	Advance to playoffs
2	IF Vallentuna BK	12	7	2	0	3	46	25	+21	28	
3	Valbo HC	12	7	0	3	2	44	32	+12	26	
4	Hammarby IF	12	6	0	1	5	46	35	+11	25	
5	Wings HC Arlanda	12	3	4	1	4	42	43	−1	22	
6	Nacka HK	12	2	0	3	7	30	52	−22	10	Proceed to Hockeyettan qualifiers
7	IFK Tumba	12	1	2	0	9	26	59	−33	7	Proceed to Hockeyettan qualifiers

== Hockeyettan Finals ==
AllEttan North winner Huddinge IF and AllEttan South winner IF Troja/Ljungby met in a best of three series. Huddinge won the series 2–1 in games, and advanced to the HockeyAllsvenskan qualifiers. Troja proceeded to the playoffs.

8 March	Huddinge IK	1–2	IF Troja/Ljungby	Björkängshallen, Huddinge	Recap

10 March	IF Troja/Ljungby	2–4	Huddinge IK	Ljungby Arena, Ljungby	Recap

11 March	IF Troja/Ljungby	1–2	Huddinge IK	Ljungby Arena, Ljungby	Recap

Huddinge won series 2–1

== Playoffs ==
=== Qualifying round ===
The winners of the spring continuation groups met in an initial qualifying round. Örnsköldsvik and Tranås won their respective series and proceeded to round 1.

Örnsköldsvik vs Sollentuna

23 February	Sollentuna HC	1–4	Örnsköldsvik HF	SVEAB Arena, Sollentuna	Recap

25 February	Örnsköldsvik HF	4–1	Sollentuna HC	Skyttishallen, Örnsköldsvik	Recap

Örnsköldsvik HF won series 2–0

Grästorp vs Tranås

23 February	Tranås AIF	4–1	Grästorps IK	Stiga Arena, Tranås	Recap

25 February	Grästorps IK	0–1	Tranås AIF	Åse & Viste Arena, Grästorp	Recap

Tranås AIF won series 2–0

=== Round 1 ===
In round 1, the surviving two teams from the qualifying round were joined by teams 2–5 from each of the two Allettan groups. Väsby IK, Piteå HC, Asplöven HC, Vimmerby HC, Kallinge-Ronneby IF, and Nybro Vikings IF won their series and advanced to round 2.

Väsby vs Tranås

2 March	Tranås AIF	3–5	Väsby IK	Stiga Arena, Tranås	Recap

4 March	Väsby IK	4–3	Tranås AIF	Vilundaparkens Ishall, Upplands Väsby	Recap

Väsby IK won series 2–0

Piteå vs Örnsköldsvik

2 March	Örnsköldsvik HF	1–3	Piteå HC	Skyttishallen, Örnsköldsvik	Recap

4 March	Piteå HC	3–2	Örnsköldsvik HF	LF Arena, Piteå	Recap

Piteå HC won series 2–0

Hudiksvall vs Asplöven

2 March	Asplöven HC	3–1	Hudiksvalls HC	ICA Arena, Haparanda	Recap

4 March	Hudiksvalls HC	3–4	OT	Asplöven HC	Glysishallen, Hudiksvall	Recap

Asplöven HC won series 2–0

Vimmerby vs Skövde

2 March	Skövde IK	2–3	Vimmerby HC	Billingehov, Skövde	Recap

4 March	Vimmerby HC	5–3	Skövde IK	Vimmerby Ishall, Vimmerby	Recap

Vimmerby HC won series 2–0

Kallinge-Ronneby vs Borlänge

2 March	Borlänge HF	1–2	OT	Kallinge-Ronneby IF	Borlänge Ishall, Borlänge	Recap

4 March	Kallinge-Ronneby IF	2–1	OT	Borlänge HF	Soft Center Arena, Kallinge	Recap

Kallinge-Ronneby IF won series 2–0

Nybro Vikings vs Kalix

2 March	Kalix HC	1–2	OT	Nybro Vikings IF	PART Arena, Kalix	Recap

4 March	Nybro Vikings IF	4–3	Kalix HC	Liljas Arena, Nybro	Recap

Nybro Vikings IF won series 2–0

=== Round 2 ===
In round 2, the winning teams from round 1 were joined by teams 2–3 from each of the Allettan groups. Kristianstads IK, Mariestad BoIS, Visby/Roma HK, Vimmerby HC, and Piteå HC won their series and advanced to Round 3.

Kristianstad vs Nybro Vikings

9 March	Nybro Vikings IF	0–1	Kristianstads IK	Liljas Arena, Nybro	Recap

11 March	Kristianstads IK	5–4	OT	Nybro Vikings IF	Kristianstads Ishall, Kristianstad	Recap

Kristianstads IK won series 2–0

Mariestad vs Asplöven

9 March	Asplöven HC	2–1	Mariestad BoIS HC	ICA Arena, Haparanda	Recap

11 March	Mariestad BoIS HC	6–4	Asplöven HC	Katrinhallen Ishall, Mariestad	Recap

12 March	Mariestad BoIS HC	2–1	Asplöven HC	Katrinhallen Ishall, Mariestad	Recap

Mariestad BoIS HC won series 2–1

Visby/Roma vs Kallinge-Ronneby

9 March	Kallinge-Ronneby IF	0–1	Visby/Roma HK	Soft Center Arena, Kallinge	Recap

11 March	Visby/Roma HK	1–2	Kallinge-Ronneby IF	Visby Ishall, Visby	Recap

12 March	Visby/Roma HK	2–1	Kallinge-Ronneby IF	Visby Ishall, Visby	Recap

Visby/Roma HK won series 2–1

IF Sundsvall vs Vimmerby

9 March	Vimmerby HC	3–2	IF Sundsvall	Vimmerby Ishall, Vimmerby	Recap

11 March	IF Sundsvall	5–4	Vimmerby HC	Sundsvall Energi Arena, Sundsvall	Recap

12 March	IF Sundsvall	2–3	Vimmerby HC	Sundsvall Energi Arena, Sundsvall	Recap

Vimmerby HC won series 2–1

Väsby vs Piteå

9 March	Piteå HC	4–5	Väsby IK	LF Arena, Piteå	Recap

11 March	Väsby IK	2–7	Piteå HC	Vilundaparkens Ishall, Upplands Väsby	Recap

12 March	Väsby IK	1–2	OT	Piteå HC	Vilundaparkens Ishall, Upplands Väsby	Recap

Piteå HC won series 2–1

=== Round 3 ===
In round 3, the winning teams from round 2 were joined by the losing team from the Hockeyettan finals, IF Troja/Ljungby. The winning teams, Kristianstads IK, Visby/Roma HK, and IF Troja/Ljungby, advanced to the HockeyAllsvenskan qualifiers.

Kristianstad vs Vimmerby

15 March	Vimmerby HC	4–1	Kristianstads IK	Kristianstads Ishall, Kristianstad	Recap

17 March	Kristianstads IK	5–2	Vimmerby HC	Vimmerby Ishall, Vimmerby	Recap

Kristianstads IK won series 2–0

Visby/Roma vs Piteå

15 March	Piteå HC	1–4	Visby/Roma HK	LF Arena, Piteå	Recap

17 March	Visby/Roma HK	4–0	Piteå HC	Visby Ishall, Visby	Recap

Visby/Roma HK won series 2–0

IF Troja/Ljungby vs Mariestad

15 March	Mariestad BoIS	2–1	OT	IF Troja/Ljungby	Katrinhallen Ishall, Mariestad	Recap

17 March	IF Troja/Ljungby	3–2	Mariestad BoIS	Ljungby Arena, Ljungby	Recap

18 March	IF Troja/Ljungby	3–2	Mariestad BoIS	Ljungby Arena, Ljungby	Recap

IF Troja/Ljungby won series 2–1

== HockeyAllsvenskan qualifiers ==
Pos	Team	Pld	W	OTW	OTL	L	GF	GA	GD	Pts	Qualification
1	Södertälje SK	10	6	1	2	1	31	23	+8	22	Qualify for the 2017–18 HockeyAllsvenskan season
2	IF Troja/Ljungby (P)	10	7	0	0	3	28	20	+8	21	Qualify for the 2017–18 HockeyAllsvenskan season
3	Kristianstads IK	10	5	1	1	3	31	23	+8	18	Qualify for the 2017–18 Hockeyettan season
4	VIK Västerås HK (R)	10	3	3	0	4	23	28	−5	15	Qualify for the 2017–18 Hockeyettan season
5	Huddinge IK	10	3	0	2	5	31	32	−1	11	Qualify for the 2017–18 Hockeyettan season
6	Visby/Roma HK	10	1	0	0	9	21	39	−18	3	Qualify for the 2017–18 Hockeyettan season

(P) Promoted; (R) Relegated

== Hockeyettan qualifiers ==
=== Hockeyettan North qualifier ===
Pos	Team	Pld	W	OTW	OTL	L	GF	GA	GD	Pts	Qualification
1	Sollefteå HK	10	8	1	1	0	46	15	+31	27	Qualify for the 2017–18 Hockeyettan season
2	Bodens HF (P)	10	7	2	1	0	41	16	+25	26	Selected for play in the 2017–18 Hockeyettan season to maintain group geography
3	Brunflo IK (R)	10	4	0	1	5	34	40	−6	13	Qualify for the 2017–18 Division 2 season
4	Ånge IK	10	3	1	0	6	30	54	−24	11	Qualify for the 2017–18 Division 2 season
5	Njurunda SK	10	1	1	2	6	21	44	−23	7	Qualify for the 2017–18 Division 2 season
6	Kiruna AIF	10	2	0	0	8	35	38	−3	6	Qualify for the 2017–18 Division 2 season

Source: https://stats.swehockey.se/ScheduleAndResults/Overview/8085
(P) Promoted; (R) Relegated

=== Hockeyettan South qualifier ===
Pos	Team	Pld	W	OTW	OTL	L	GF	GA	GD	Pts	Qualification
1	Halmstad HF	8	6	0	0	2	17	12	+5	18	Qualify for the 2017–18 Hockeyettan season
2	HA 74 Sävsjö (P)	8	5	0	0	3	32	27	+5	15	Selected for play in the 2017–18 Hockeyettan season to maintain group geography
3	Mjölby HC	8	4	1	1	2	29	24	+5	15	Qualify for the 2017–18 Division 2 season
4	Kalmar HC	8	2	0	1	5	26	32	−6	7	Qualify for the 2017–18 Division 2 season
5	Värnamo GIK	8	1	1	0	6	17	26	−9	5	Qualify for the 2017–18 Division 2 season

(P) Promoted

=== Hockeyettan West qualifier ===
Pos	Team	Pld	W	OTW	OTL	L	GF	GA	GD	Pts	Qualification
1	Surahammars IF	10	7	2	0	1	43	20	+23	25	Qualify for the 2017–18 Hockeyettan season
2	Grums IK (P)	10	7	0	1	2	41	26	+15	22	Selected for play in the 2017–18 Hockeyettan season to maintain group geography
3	Söderhamn/Ljusne HC	10	4	1	2	3	28	30	−2	16	Qualify for the 2017–18 Division 2 season
4	Åker/Strängnäs HC (R)	10	3	2	1	4	43	42	+1	14	Qualify for the 2017–18 Division 2 season
5	Falu IF	10	2	0	1	7	27	38	−11	7	Qualify for the 2017–18 Division 2 season
6	Oppala IK	10	1	1	1	7	18	44	−26	6	Qualify for the 2017–18 Division 2 season

Source: https://stats.swehockey.se/ScheduleAndResults/Overview/8052
(P) Promoted; (R) Relegated

=== Hockeyettan East qualifier ===
Pos	Team	Pld	W	OTW	OTL	L	GF	GA	GD	Pts	Qualification
1	Hanvikens SK (P)	10	8	0	0	2	40	21	+19	24	Qualify for the 2017–18 Hockeyettan season
2	Gripen HC (P)	10	7	0	0	3	41	33	+8	21	Selected for play in the 2017–18 Hockeyettan season to maintain group geography
3	Nacka HK	10	5	1	0	4	41	35	+6	17	Selected for play in the 2017–18 Hockeyettan season after the Haninge Anchors organization was denied an elite-level hockey license
4	Eskilstuna Linden Hockey	10	5	0	1	4	46	4	+42	16	Qualify for the 2017–18 Division 2 season
5	IFK Tumba IK (R)	10	2	0	0	8	26	40	−14	6	Qualify for the 2017–18 Division 2 season
6	Nynäshamns IF HC	10	2	0	0	8	34	59	−25	6	Qualify for the 2017–18 Division 2 season

Source: https://stats.swehockey.se/ScheduleAndResults/Overview/8096
(P) Promoted; (R) Relegated
