= 2014–15 Hockeyettan season =

- League: Hockeyettan
- Sport: Ice hockey
- Duration: 21 September 2014 – 4 April 2015
- Number of teams: 47

Hockeyettan seasons
- ← 2013–14 2015–16 →

The 2014–15 Hockeyettan season was the 16th season that Hockeyettan (up until this season referred to mainly as Division 1) has functioned as the third tier of ice hockey in Sweden, organized by the Swedish Ice Hockey Association (SIHA). The initial groups began on 21 September 2014 and ended on 10 December 2014. The following Allettan groups and continuation groups started on 27 December 2014 and finished on 15 February 2015. The promotion playoffs to the HockeyAllsvenskan qualifier began on 19 February 2015 and ended on 6–7 March 2015. The Hockeyettan qualifiers began on 1 March 2015 and ended on 25 March 2015. The HockeyAllsvenskan qualifier began on 12 March 2015 and ended on 4 April 2015.

== Format ==
The 2014–15 Hockeyettan season will feature 47 teams divided into four geographical groups: Norra ("North"), Östra ("East"), Västra ("West"), and Södra ("South"). This is a contraction compared to the previous season, which featured 53 teams divided into five groups. With the exception of Hockeyettan North which will have 11 teams, each of the groups will consist of 12 teams. At the end of the groups in December, the top four teams in each of the Hockeyettan North and Hockeyettan East groups will qualify for the Allettan Norra group, and the top four teams in each of the Hockeyettan West and Hockeyettan South groups will qualify for the Allettan Södra group, after Christmas. Meanwhile, the remaining teams in each starting group will continue playing in their starting group ("continuation group") after Christmas. In the continuation groups, the teams will be given extra points dependent on their ranking in their initial group; the lowest-ranked team gets 0 points, the second-lowest-ranked team gets 1 point, the third-lowest-ranked team gets 2 points, and so on. The two Allettan winners will go directly to the 2015 HockeyAllsvenskan qualifier (Swedish: Kvalserien till HockeyAllsvenskan), which determines promotion to the second-tier league HockeyAllsvenskan. The top two teams in each of the four continuation groups, as well as the teams ranked 2–5 in each of the two Allettan groups, will qualify for the promotion playoffs, which are played in three rounds—PlayOff 1, 2, and 3—and battle to reach the HockeyAllsvenskan qualifier. Each playoff team will start in PlayOff 1, unlike previous seasons where a certain team's placement in their spring group affected whether that team started in PlayOff 1, 2 or 3. The worst-ranked team in the Norra continuation group, and the two worst-ranked teams in each of the three other continuation groups, will have to play in the Hockeyettan qualifier round-robin tournament (Swedish: Kvalserien till Hockeyettan) for their region to avoid relegation to Division 2, the fourth-tier league. In each of the four Hockeyettan qualifiers, the Hockeyettan team(s) will face four of the best teams from the four Division 2 regions. The North Hockeyettan team will face all four teams from Division 2 North; the East Hockeyettan teams will face two teams from Division 2 East, one from Division 2 West and one from Division 2 South; the West Hockeyettan teams will face two teams from Division 2 West, one from Division 2 East and one from Division 2 South; and the Hockeyettan South teams will face two teams from Division 2 South, one from Division 2 East and one from Division 2 West. Per the 2014–15 season format, only the top-ranked team from each of the four qualifiers will be guaranteed a spot in Hockeyettan for the 2015–16 season. The two remaining playoff teams after PlayOff 3 will join the two Allettan winners and the two lowest-ranked teams in HockeyAllsvenskan in the 2015 HockeyAllsvenskan qualifier, where the teams will play a double round-robin tournament and battle for four spots in HockeyAllsvenskan for the 2015–16 season. The remaining teams in the Allettan groups and the continuation groups will remain in Hockeyettan for the 2015–16 season. All groups that are formed in the season, including the initial ones and the qualifiers for HockeyAllsvenskan and Hockeyettan, will be played as double round-robins, with each team playing the other teams in their group once at home and once on the road.

Per the format in the 2014–15 season, the 2015–16 season would be contracted down to 42 teams. It would mark the league's fifth contraction in six seasons, with the first contraction occurring in the 2010–11 season (down to 57 teams from 58). However, the SIHA may promote more teams from the Hockeyettan qualifiers than planned, depending on if teams from HockeyAllsvenskan are relegated and what groups those teams are placed in for the 2015–16 season.

=== Playing format ===
Each game consists of three 20-minute regulation periods, for a total of 60 minutes. After the 60 regulation minutes, the team with the most goals scored wins the game. If a non-playoff game is tied after regulation time, a five-minute overtime period ensues, in which the team scoring the next goal wins the game. If no team scores during the overtime period, a shootout ensues, with each team taking three penalty shots against the opposing team's goaltender. If the game is still tied after the three penalty shot rounds, additional rounds ensue until one team scores and the other team doesn't. In non-playoff games, points are awarded for each game, with a win in regulation time giving 3 points, an overtime/shootout win 2 points, an overtime/shootout loss 1 point, and a regulation loss 0 points. In the promotion playoffs, if a game is tied after regulation time, 20-minute overtime periods ensue until one team scores and wins the game.

=== Tiebreak ===
In group play, if two or more teams end up tied in points, the following tiebreakers are used:

1. Better goal difference;
2. Higher number of goals scored;
3. Results in games between the tied teams.

== Participating clubs ==
Per the playing format in the previous season, Hockeyettan would be contracted by 10 teams for the 2014–15 season. The SIHA originally planned to have 48 teams in this season but eventually decided to have only 11 teams in Hockeyettan North, giving a total of 47 teams. The East, West, and South groups all have 12 teams each. The previous season featured 53 teams divided into five groups. The SIHA promoted the four second-placed teams from Hockeyettan qualifiers C–F to get 47 teams in the 2014–15 season. However, two of those 47 qualified teams pulled out of the league during the preseason, resulting in two other teams being promoted from the qualifiers:

- Nyköpings HK, who had qualified by reaching Allettan Central and been placed in the West group, went bankrupt on 15 April 2014 and ceased to exist. In response, the SIHA promoted third-placed Varberg Vipers from qualifier F and placed them in the South group; moved HC Dalen from the West group to the South group; and moved Västerviks IK and Vimmerby HC from the South group to the West group.
- Falu IF, who won qualifier C and were seated in the West group, demanded relegation to Division 2 on 13 May 2014 due to financial problems. The SIHA responded by promoting third-placed Grästorps IK from qualifier E to replace Falu's spot in Hockeyettan West.

Hockeyettan North	Hockeyettan East	Hockeyettan West	Hockeyettan South
IF Sundsvall Hockey; Kalix UHC; Kiruna IF; Kovlands IshF; Örnsköldsviks HF; Östersunds IK; Piteå HC; SK Lejon; Sollefteå HK; Tegs SK; Vännäs HC	Åker/Strängnäs HC; Enköpings SK HK; Hammarby IF; Haninge Anchors HC (p); Huddinge IK; Hudiksvalls HC; IF Vallentuna BK; Tierps HK; Värmdö HC (p); Väsby IK HK; Visby/Roma HK; Wings HC Arlanda	Borlänge HF; Forshaga IF; Grästorps IK; IFK Arboga IK (p); Kumla HC Black Bulls; Lindlövens IF; Mariestad BoIS HC; Skövde IK; Surahammars IF; Tranås AIF IF; Västerviks IK; Vimmerby HC	Halmstad HF; HC Dalen (p); Helsingborgs HC; IF Troja/Ljungby (r); IK Pantern; Kallinge-Ronneby IF; Kristianstads IK; Mörrums GoIS IK; Nybro Vikings IF; Olofströms IK; Tingsryds AIF; Varberg Vipers (p)

r = Relegated from 2013–14 HockeyAllsvenskan
p = Promoted from 2013–14 Division 2

=== Team map ===
Hockeyettan team map. North. East. West. South.

== Initial groups ==
=== Hockeyettan North ===
* Teams 1–4 play the second half of the season in Allettan North.
* Teams 5–11 continue in the same group.

#	Team	GP	W	T	L	GF	GA	GD	TP	OTW	OTL	GWSW	GWSL
1	IF Sundsvall	20	17	3	0	86	36	+50	55	1	0	0	2
2	Kalix UHC	20	13	5	2	90	43	+47	48	1	0	3	1
3	Piteå HC	20	14	3	3	80	38	+42	47	0	0	2	1
4	Östersunds IK	20	12	2	6	76	51	+25	39	0	0	1	1
5	Örnsköldsvik HF	20	11	3	6	76	53	+23	37	1	1	0	1
6	Kiruna IF	20	7	5	8	73	65	+8	29	2	1	1	1
7	Tegs SK	20	6	2	12	48	61	–13	22	0	0	2	0
8	Vännäs HC	20	6	3	11	42	69	–27	21	0	3	0	0
9	Kovlands IshF	20	4	4	12	44	64	–20	18	2	1	0	1
10	SK Lejon	20	2	2	16	40	103	–63	8	0	1	0	1
11	Sollefteå HK	20	2	0	18	34	106	–72	6	0	0	0	0

=== Hockeyettan East ===
* Teams 1–4 play the second half of the season in Allettan North.
* Teams 5–12 continue in the same group.

#	Team	GP	W	T	L	GF	GA	GD	TP	OTW	OTL	GWSW	GWSL
1	Huddinge IK	22	14	5	3	87	48	+39	51	4	0	0	1
2	Visby/Roma HK	22	13	3	6	88	67	+21	44	2	0	0	1
3	Hudiksvalls HC	22	12	4	6	74	58	+16	43	0	1	3	0
4	Wings HC	22	13	0	9	82	59	+23	39	0	0	0	0
5	Åker/Strängnäs HC	22	11	3	8	84	85	–1	38	1	1	1	0
6	Väsby IK	22	10	3	9	65	66	–1	34	1	0	0	2
7	Haninge Anchors HC	22	9	2	11	72	88	–16	30	1	1	0	0
8	Enköpings SK	22	8	3	11	56	60	–4	29	2	0	0	1
9	Hammarby IF	22	8	3	11	60	64	–4	28	1	2	0	0
10	Tierps HK	22	5	6	11	70	80	–10	23	1	3	1	1
11	Vallentuna BK	22	5	6	11	64	81	–17	23	1	4	1	0
12	Värmdö HC	22	4	2	16	56	102	–46	14	0	2	0	0

=== Hockeyettan West ===
* Teams 1–4 play the second half of the season in Allettan South.
* Teams 5–12 continue in the same group.

#	Team	GP	W	T	L	GF	GA	GD	TP	OTW	OTL	GWSW	GWSL
1	Västerviks IK	22	15	4	3	89	50	+39	51	2	1	0	1
2	Tranås AIF	22	15	3	4	97	64	+33	50	0	1	2	0
3	Vimmerby HC	22	13	4	5	100	61	+39	46	0	1	3	0
4	Skövde IK	22	13	3	6	93	60	+33	44	1	0	1	1
5	Mariestad BoIS	22	10	4	8	73	60	+13	36	1	1	1	1
6	Kumla HC Black Bulls	22	9	5	8	73	63	+10	36	3	0	1	1
7	Borlänge HF	22	10	4	8	83	83	±0	36	0	0	2	2
8	Lindlövens IF	22	7	4	11	70	70	±0	26	0	1	1	2
9	IFK Arboga IK	22	6	3	13	63	102	–39	22	1	1	0	1
10	Surahammars IF	22	5	2	15	45	98	–53	18	0	0	1	1
11	Forshaga IF	22	3	6	13	75	106	–31	17	2	4	0	0
12	Grästorps IK	22	2	6	14	51	95	–44	14	2	2	0	2

=== Hockeyettan South ===
* Teams 1–4 play the second half of the season in Allettan South.
* Teams 5–12 continue in the same group.

#	Team	GP	W	T	L	GF	GA	GD	TP	OTW	OTL	GWSW	GWSL
1	Kristianstads IK	22	17	1	4	100	72	+28	53	0	0	1	0
2	IK Pantern	22	14	3	5	82	51	+31	48	1	0	2	0
3	IF Troja/Ljungby	22	13	5	4	90	56	+34	46	2	1	0	2
4	Tingsryds AIF	22	14	1	7	85	51	+34	44	1	0	0	0
5	Nybro Vikings IF	22	10	4	8	67	66	+1	35	0	3	1	0
6	Kallinge-Ronneby IF	22	7	5	10	57	51	+6	30	1	1	3	0
7	Halmstad HF	22	8	4	10	65	63	+2	29	0	2	1	1
8	Varberg HK	22	7	6	9	60	75	–15	29	1	1	1	3
9	Helsingborgs HC	22	5	5	12	59	73	–14	24	3	0	1	1
10	Mörrums GoIS IK	22	7	2	13	54	84	–30	23	0	1	0	1
11	HC Dalen	22	6	1	15	59	84	–25	19	0	0	0	1
12	Olofströms IK	22	3	5	14	47	99	–52	16	2	2	0	1

== AllEttan groups ==
=== AllEttan North ===
* Team 1 continues directly to the HockeyAllsvenskan qualifiers
* Teams 2–5 continue to the Playoffs

#	Team	GP	W	T	L	GF	GA	GD	TP	OTW	OTL	GWSW	GWSL
1	IF Sundsvall Hockey	14	11	3	0	39	19	+20	37	0	1	1	1
2	Östersunds IK	14	7	5	2	44	30	+14	30	2	1	2	0
3	Huddinge IK	14	8	3	3	44	30	+14	28	1	0	0	2
4	Piteå HC	14	6	4	4	47	33	+14	24	2	2	0	0
5	Hudiksvalls HC	14	5	3	6	45	45	±0	19	0	2	1	0
6	Kalix UHC	14	3	2	9	34	48	–14	12	1	0	0	1
7	Wings HC	14	2	3	9	32	54	–22	10	1	1	0	1
8	Visby/Roma HK	14	2	1	11	33	59	–26	8	0	0	1	0

=== AllEttan South ===
* Team 1 continues directly to the HockeyAllsvenskan qualifiers
* Teams 2–5 continue to the Playoffs

#	Team	GP	W	T	L	GF	GA	GD	TP	OTW	OTL	GWSW	GWSL
1	IK Pantern	14	9	2	3	44	22	+22	30	1	0	0	1
2	IF Troja/Ljungby	14	7	4	3	37	24	+13	28	2	0	1	1
3	Tingsryds AIF	14	5	6	3	41	35	+6	25	1	1	3	1
4	Västerviks IK	14	5	6	3	41	35	+6	22	1	1	0	4
5	Kristianstads IK	14	5	3	6	39	27	+2	20	1	1	1	0
6	Tranås AIF	14	5	3	6	29	38	–9	19	0	2	1	0
7	Skövde IK	14	2	4	8	31	48	–17	12	1	1	1	1
8	Vimmerby HC	14	3	2	9	35	58	–23	12	0	1	1	0

== Continuation groups ==
=== Hockeyettan North continuation ===
* Teams 1–2 continue to the Playoffs
* Teams 7–8 continue to the Division 1 qualifiers

#	Team	GP	W	T	L	GF	GA	GD	TP	OTW	OTL	GWSW	GWSL
1	Örnsköldsvik HF	12	9	2	1	58	25	+33	36	1	1	0	0
2	Kovlands IshF	12	9	1	2	42	32	+10	30	0	0	0	1
3	Kiruna IF	12	8	0	4	56	33	+23	29	0	0	0	0
4	Tegs SK	12	4	1	7	34	35	–1	18	0	0	1	0
5	Vännäs HC	12	3	2	7	37	55	–18	14	0	2	0	0
6	Sollefteå HK	12	4	0	8	31	53	–22	12	0	0	0	0
7	SK Lejon	12	1	2	9	27	52	–25	8	2	0	0	0

=== Hockeyettan East continuation ===
* Teams 1–2 continue to the Playoffs
* Teams 7–8 continue to the Division 1 qualifiers

#	Team	GP	W	T	L	GF	GA	GD	TP	OTW	OTL	GWSW	GWSL
1	Åker/Strängnäs HC	14	9	2	3	61	46	+15	37	1	1	0	0
2	Haninge Anchors HC	14	8	2	4	68	45	+23	33	1	0	1	0
3	Enköpings SK	14	8	1	5	53	52	+1	29	0	1	0	0
4	Tierps HK	14	7	1	6	55	52	+3	25	1	0	0	0
5	Hammarby IF	14	6	1	7	38	41	–3	22	0	0	0	1
6	Väsby IK	14	5	1	8	38	52	–14	22	0	1	0	0
7	Värmdö HC	14	6	1	7	52	54	–2	20	1	0	0	0
8	Vallentuna BK	14	2	1	11	39	62	–23	8	0	1	0	0

=== Hockeyettan West continuation ===
* Teams 1–2 continue to the Playoffs
* Teams 7–8 continue to the Division 1 qualifiers

#	Team	GP	W	T	L	GF	GA	GD	TP	OTW	OTL	GWSW	GWSL
1	Mariestad BoIS	14	9	2	3	51	28	+23	37	0	0	1	1
2	Kumla HC Black Bulls	14	8	2	4	46	29	+17	34	2	0	0	0
3	Lindlövens IF	14	8	0	6	50	47	+3	28	0	0	0	0
4	Borlänge HF	14	6	2	6	50	39	+11	27	1	0	1	0
5	Grästorps IK	14	7	2	5	29	33	–4	23	0	2	0	0
6	Forshaga IF	14	7	1	6	40	46	–6	23	0	0	0	1
7	IFK Arboga IK	14	3	2	9	49	57	–8	14	0	1	0	1
8	Surahammars IF	14	2	1	11	28	64	–36	10	0	0	1	0

=== Hockeyettan South continuation ===
* Teams 1–2 continue to the Playoffs
* Teams 7–8 continue to the Division 1 qualifiers

#	Team	GP	W	T	L	GF	GA	GD	TP	OTW	OTL	GWSW	GWSL
1	Helsingborgs HC	14	12	0	2	51	28	+23	39	0	0	0	0
2	Kallinge-Ronneby IF	14	10	1	3	62	32	+30	38	1	0	0	0
3	Nybro Vikings IF	14	6	2	6	47	42	+5	28	1	0	0	1
4	Halmstad HF	14	6	3	5	38	36	+2	28	1	1	1	0
5	Varberg HK	14	4	3	7	41	45	–4	19	0	2	0	1
6	HC Dalen	14	4	3	7	32	39	–7	19	2	0	1	0
7	Mörrums GoIS IK	14	5	2	7	33	41	–8	19	0	1	0	1
8	Olofströms IK	14	1	2	11	32	73	–41	6	0	1	1	0

== Playoffs ==
Teams 2–5 from the AllEttan groups and teams 1–2 from the continuation groups meet in a three-round playoff, each round best of three games. The two remaining teams at the end of the three playoff rounds join the AllEttan group winners (as well as teams 13–14 from the 2014–15 HockeyAllsvenskan season) in the HockeyAllsvenskan qualifiers.

=== Playoff 1 ===
==== Östersund vs Kovland (2–0) ====
February 19, 2015; 19:00	Kovlands IshF	0 – 5 (0-2, 0-1, 0-2)	Östersunds IK	Ånäshallen, Kovland; Attendance: 310

Game reference
12 min	Penalties	10 min
27	Shots	31

February 21, 2015; 16:00	Östersunds IK	11 – 2 (3-0, 4-0, 4-2)	Kovlands IshF	Östersund Arena, Östersund; Attendance: 579

Game reference
37 min	Penalties	14 min
46	Shots	37

==== Huddinge vs Haninge (2–1) ====
February 19, 2015; 19:00	Haninge Anchors HC	6 – 5 (2-1, 3-1, 1-3)	Huddinge IK	Torvalla Ishall, Handen; Attendance: 478

Game reference
49 min	Penalties	12 min
27	Shots	42

February 21, 2015; 16:00	Huddinge IK	6 – 1 (1-0, 4-1, 1-0)	Haninge Anchors HC	Björkängshallen, Huddinge; Attendance: 508

Game reference
6 min	Penalties	14 min
55	Shots	13

February 22, 2015; 16:00	Huddinge IK	3 – 2 OT (0-2, 0-0, 2-0, 1-0)	Haninge Anchors HC	Björkängshallen, Huddinge; Attendance: 609

Game reference
27 min	Penalties	35 min
42	Shots	15

==== Piteå vs Örnsköldsvik (2–0) ====
February 19, 2015; 19:00	Örnsköldsvik HF	3 – 4 (1-0, 2-3, 0-1)	Piteå HC	Skyttishallen, Örnsköldsvik; Attendance: 482

Game reference
24 min	Penalties	16 min
28	Shots	29

February 21, 2015; 16:00	Piteå HC	5 – 2 (1-0, 3-1, 1-1)	Örnsköldsvik HF	LF Arena, Piteå; Attendance: 587

Game reference
8 min	Penalties	24 min
38	Shots	23

==== Hudiksvall vs Åker/Strängnäs (2–0) ====
February 19, 2015; 19:00	Åker/Strängnäs HC	5–8 (2-1, 3-4, 0-3)	Hudiksvalls HC	Åkers Ishall, Åkers Styckebruk; Attendance: 404

Game reference
2 min	Penalties	6 min
35	Shots	28

February 21, 2015; 18:00	Hudiksvalls HC	5 – 3 (2-1, 0-2, 3-0)	Åker/Strängnäs HC	Glysishallen, Hudiksvall; Attendance: 711

Game reference
8 min	Penalties	2 min
19	Shots	33

==== Troja/Ljungby vs Kumla (2–0) ====
February 19, 2015; 19:00	Kumla HC Black Bulls	0 – 11 (0-6, 0-3, 0-2)	IF Troja/Ljungby	Weidermans Buss Arena, Kumla; Attendance: 443

Game reference
12 min	Penalties	8 min
25	Shots	38

February 21, 2015; 16:00	IF Troja/Ljungby	4 – 2 (1-0, 2-2, 1-0)	Kumla HC Black Bulls	Sunnerbohov, Ljungby; Attendance: 1,527

Game reference
4 min	Penalties	14 min
41	Shots	21

==== Tingsryd vs Kallinge-Ronneby (2–0) ====
February 19, 2015; 19:00	Kallinge-Ronneby IF	1 – 3 (0-1, 0-1, 1-1)	Tingsryds AIF	Kockumhallen, Kallinge; Attendance: 1,384

Game reference
10 min	Penalties	20 min
21	Shots	28

February 21, 2015; 16:00	Tingsryds AIF	4 – 2 (2-1, 1-0, 1-1)	Kallinge-Ronneby IF	Nelson Garden Arena, Tingsryd; Attendance: 2,623

Game reference
12 min	Penalties	37 min
37	Shots	28

==== Västervik vs Mariestad (2–0) ====
February 19, 2015; 19:00	Mariestad BoIS HC	0 – 2 (0-0, 0-0, 0-2)	Västerviks IK	Katrinhallen Ishall, Mariestad; Attendance: 1,284

Game reference
12 min	Penalties	12 min
28	Shots	26

February 21, 2015; 16:00	Västerviks IK	5 – 2 (1-1, 3-1, 1-0)	Mariestad BoIS HC	Plivit Trade hallen, Västervik; Attendance: 968

Game reference
8 min	Penalties	20 min
31	Shots	18

==== Kristianstad vs Helsingborg (2–1) ====
February 19, 2015; 19:00	Helsingborgs HC	3 – 2 OT (0-0, 2-1, 0-1, 1-0)	Kristianstads IK	Olympiarinken, Helsingborg; Attendance: 1,128

Game reference
4 min	Penalties	10 min
29	Shots	26

February 21, 2015; 17:00	Kristianstads IK	6 – 3 (2-0, 2-2, 2-1)	Helsingborgs HC	Kristianstads Ishall, Kristianstad; Attendance: 1,273

Game reference
8 min	Penalties	8 min
42	Shots	27

February 22, 2015; 16:00	Kristianstads IK	2 – 1 (1-1, 1-0, 0-0)	Helsingborgs HC	Kristianstads Ishall, Kristianstad; Attendance: 1,135

Game reference
4 min	Penalties	6 min
31	Shots	36

=== Playoff 2 ===
==== Kristianstad vs Tingsryd (0–2) ====
February 26, 2015; 19:00	Tingsryds AIF	4 – 3 (2-2, 2-1, 0-0)	Kristianstads IK	Nelson Garden Arena, Tingsryd; Attendance: 2,021

Game reference
4 min	Penalties	4 min
26	Shots	24

February 28, 2015; 16:15	Kristianstads IK	1 – 3 (0-1, 0-0, 1-2)	Tingsryds AIF	Kristianstads Ishall, Kristianstad; Attendance: 1,437

Game reference
12 min	Penalties	12 min
33	Shots	32

==== Västervik vs Hudiksvall (2–0) ====
February 26, 2015; 19:00	Hudiksvalls HC	3 – 5 (2-0, 0-4, 1-1)	Västerviks IK	Glysishallen, Hudiksvall; Attendance: 1,002

Game reference
10 min	Penalties	6 min
26	Shots	30

February 28, 2015; 16:00	Västerviks IK	3 – 0 (1-0, 1-0, 1-0)	Hudiksvalls HC	Plivit Trade hallen, Västervik; Attendance: 1,076

Game reference
6 min	Penalties	24 min
39	Shots	22

==== Huddinge vs Östersund (2–1) ====
February 26, 2015; 19:00	Östersunds IK	5 – 2 (1-1, 2-0, 2-1)	Huddinge IK	Östersund Arena, Östersund; Attendance: 1,423

Game reference
12 min	Penalties	6 min
26	Shots	34

February 28, 2015; 16:00	Huddinge IK	6 – 3 (3-0, 2-2, 1-1)	Östersunds IK	Björkängshallen, Huddinge; Attendance: 569

Game reference
12 min	Penalties	33 min
36	Shots	22

March 1, 2015; 17:00	Huddinge IK	4 – 0 (1-0, 0-0, 3-0)	Östersunds IK	Björkängshallen, Huddinge; Attendance: 627

Game reference
2 min	Penalties	8 min
43	Shots	27

==== Piteå vs Troja/Ljungby (0–2) ====
February 26, 2015; 19:00	IF Troja/Ljungby	3 – 1 (1-0, 1-0, 1-1)	Piteå HC	Sunnerbohov, Ljungby; Attendance: 1,701

Game reference
6 min	Penalties	6 min
31	Shots	28

February 28, 2015; 16:00	Piteå HC	3 – 5 (1-2, 2-2, 0-1)	IF Troja/Ljungby	LF Arena, Piteå; Attendance: 676

Game reference
43 min	Penalties	12 min
31	Shots	28

=== Playoff 3 ===
==== Västervik vs Troja/Ljungby (2–1) ====
March 4, 2015; 19:00	IF Troja/Ljungby	1 – 2 OT (0-0, 0-0, 1-1, 0-1)	Västerviks IK	Sunnerbohov, Ljungby; Attendance: 1,993

Game reference
12 min	Penalties	24 min
42	Shots	24

March 6, 2015; 19:00	Västerviks IK	3 – 4 OT (0-0, 1-2, 2-1, 0-1)	IF Troja/Ljungby	Plivit Trade hallen, Västervik; Attendance: 1,519

Game reference
8 min	Penalties	6 min
31	Shots	28

March 7, 2015; 16:00	Västerviks IK	2 – 1 OT (0-1, 1-0, 0-0, 1-0)	IF Troja/Ljungby	Plivit Trade hallen, Västervik; Attendance: 1,150

Game reference
31 min	Penalties	6 min
12	Shots	18

==== Huddinge vs Tingsryd (0–2) ====
March 4, 2015; 19:00	Tingsryds AIF	3 – 2 OT (0-0, 1-1, 1-1, 1-0)	Huddinge IK	Nelson Garden Arena, Tingsryd; Attendance: 1,918

Game reference
4 min	Penalties	2 min
45	Shots	32

March 6, 2015; 19:00	Huddinge IK	4 – 5 OT (2-3, 1-1, 1-0, 0-1)	Tingsryds AIF	Björkängshallen, Huddinge; Attendance: 768

Game reference
8 min	Penalties	18 min
34	Shots	24

== Hockeyettan qualifiers ==
In the Hockeyettan qualifying groups, only the group winner was guaranteed a spot in the 2015–16 Hockeyettan season. Additional teams were to be selected by the Hockey Association to correct for re-alignment of teams, and for the promotion of Sundsvall, Tingsryd, and Pantern to HockeyAllsvenskan.

The result of the qualifiers was the promotion of Brunflo IK, AIK Hockey Härnösand, Sollentuna HC and Köping HC, and the relegation of Värmdö HC. The net gain of three clubs was due to the expansion of the SHL from 12 teams to 14, as well as the expansion of Hockeyettan North from 11 teams to 12.

Key
* Qualified for play in Hockeyettan for the 2015–16 season.
* Selected for play in Hockeyettan to maintain group geography.
* Qualified for play in Division 2 for the 2015–16 season
▲ Team was promoted	▼ Team was relegated

=== Qualifier A ===
Qualifier A was contested by SK Lejon from Hockeyettan North and Brunflo IK, AIK Hockey Härnösand, and Bodens HF from Division 2. SK Lejon won the group and thereby secured a spot in Hockeyettan for the following season.

Hockeyettan North consisted of only 11 teams for the 2014–15 season rather than 12. This empty spot was to be filled for the following season. Furthermore, IF Sundsvall Hockey was promoted to HockeyAllsvenskan. These two vacancies were filled by Brunflo and Härnösand who finished 2nd and 3rd in this qualifier.

#	Team	GP	W	T	L	GF	GA	GD	TP	OTW	OTL	GWSW	GWSL
1	SK Lejon	6	4	1	1	22	15	+7	14	1	0	0	0
2	▲ Brunflo IK	6	2	3	1	23	22	+1	10	0	2	1	0
3	▲AIK Hockey Härnösand	6	1	3	2	23	21	+2	8	1	0	1	1
4	Bodens HF	6	1	1	4	13	23	–10	4	0	0	0	1

=== Qualifier B ===
Vallentuna BK won qualifying group B, and thereby secured continued play in Hockeyettan for the 2015–16 season. Värmdö HC finished 3rd and were relegated. Sollentuna HC from Division 2 finished second, and were promoted to Hockeyettan after Södertälje SK's relegation from HockeyAllsvenskan to Hockeyettan East was compensated by moving Enköpings SK to the western group.

#	Team	GP	W	T	L	GF	GA	GD	TP	OTW	OTL	GWSW	GWSL
1	Vallentuna BK	10	8	0	2	43	19	+24	24	0	0	0	0
2	▲ Sollentuna HC	10	7	0	3	43	17	+26	21	0	0	0	0
3	▼ Värmdö HC	10	5	3	2	38	24	+14	19	0	1	1	1
4	IFK Tumba IK	10	4	2	4	36	33	+3	16	2	0	0	0
5	Nynäshamns IF HC	10	1	2	7	32	62	–30	7	0	0	2	0
6	Bålsta HC	10	0	3	7	17	54	–37	3	0	1	0	2

=== Qualifier C ===
Surahammars IF re-qualified for Hockeyettan by winning qualifying group C. Off-season group re-alignment moved Västervik and Vimmerby to the southern group and brought in Enköping from the eastern group, resulting in a net addition of one spot in Hockeyettan West. This allowed second-place IFK Arboga IK to re-qualify and third-place Köping HC to be promoted to fill the vacancy.

#	Team	GP	W	T	L	GF	GA	GD	TP	OTW	OTL	GWSW	GWSL
1	Surahammars IF	10	8	1	1	41	17	+24	25	0	1	0	0
2	IFK Arboga IK	10	7	1	2	46	27	+19	23	1	0	0	0
3	▲ Köping HC	10	7	1	2	42	24	+18	23	1	0	0	0
4	Valbo HC	10	3	1	6	29	40	–11	11	1	0	0	0
5	IFK Hallsberg Hockey	10	1	2	7	20	47	–27	5	0	2	0	0
6	Fagersta AIK	10	0	2	8	24	47	–23	3	1	1	0	0

=== Qualifier D ===
Mörrums GoIS IK won the group and secured continued play in Hockeyettan for the 2015–16 season. The promotion of Tingsryd and Pantern to HockeyAllsvenskan was compensated by moving Västervik and Vimmerby to Hockeyettan South, resulting in zero net change for the southern group. This allowed Tyringe SoSS who finished second in the group to retain their spot.

#	Team	GP	W	T	L	GF	GA	GD	TP	OTW	OTL	GWSW	GWSL
1	Mörrums GoIS IK	10	4	5	1	36	18	+18	22	4	0	1	0
2	Tyringe SoSS	10	6	3	1	33	24	+9	22	1	1	0	1
3	Olofströms IK	10	5	2	3	28	27	+1	17	0	1	0	1
4	Bäcken HC	10	4	2	4	27	31	–4	15	0	1	1	0
5	Hanhals IF	10	2	2	6	26	29	–3	9	1	1	0	0
6	Alvesta SK	10	0	4	6	18	39	–21	5	0	2	1	1
