= 2017–18 Hockeyettan season =

- League: Hockeyettan
- Sport: Ice hockey
- Duration: 17 September 2017 – 25 February 2018 (post-season until 18 April)
- Teams: 47

Hockeyettan seasons
- ← 2016–17 2018–19 →

The 2017–18 Hockeyettan season was the fourth season that the third tier of ice hockey in Sweden has been organized under that name. The regular season began on 17 September 2017 and will end on 25 February 2018, to be followed by promotion and relegation playoffs until 18 April. The league was left with 47 teams after IF Sundsvall Hockey withdrew from the league due to financial reasons.

== Autumn season ==
=== Hockeyettan North ===
Pos	Team	Pld	W	OTW	OTL	L	GF	GA	GD	Pts	Qualification
1	Piteå HC	20	17	1	0	2	99	34	+65	53	Advance to Allettan North
2	Östersunds IK	20	12	3	2	3	67	33	+34	44	Advance to Allettan North
3	Kalix HC	20	12	2	1	5	71	41	+30	41	Advance to Allettan North
4	Örnsköldsvik HF	20	12	1	2	5	69	39	+30	40	Advance to Allettan North
5	Bodens HF	20	10	1	3	6	54	42	+12	35	Advance to Allettan North
6	Vännäs HC	20	5	4	5	6	51	59	−8	28	Advance to Hockeyettan North (spring)
7	Asplöven HC	20	7	1	2	10	64	66	−2	25	Advance to Hockeyettan North (spring)
8	Kiruna IF	20	6	1	3	10	40	59	−19	23	Advance to Hockeyettan North (spring)
9	SK Lejon	20	5	0	2	13	35	67	−32	17	Advance to Hockeyettan North (spring)
10	Sollefteå HK	20	2	4	0	14	47	100	−53	14	Advance to Hockeyettan North (spring)
11	Tegs SK	20	2	2	0	16	31	88	−57	10	Advance to Hockeyettan North (spring)

== Participating teams ==
Hockeyettan North	Hockeyettan South	Hockeyettan West	Hockeyettan East
Asplöven HC; Bodens HF; Kalix HC; Kiruna IF; Örnsköldsvik HF; Östersunds IK; Piteå HC; SK Lejon; Sollefteå HK; Tegs SK; Vännäs HC	Grästorps IK; HC Dalen; Halmstad HF; HA 74 Sävsjö; Hanhals IF; Helsingsborgs HC; Nybro Vikings IF; Kallinge-Ronneby IF; Kristianstads IK; Tranås AIF; Tyringe SoSS; Vimmerby HC	Borlänge HF; Enköpings SK HK; Forshaga IF; Grums IK; IFK Arboga; Köping HC; Kumla HC; Lindlövens IF; Mariestad BoIS; Skövde IK; Surhammars IF; VIK Västerås HK	Hammarby IF; Hanvikens SK; Hudiksvalls HC; Huddinge IK; IF Vallentuna BK; Nacka HK; Nyköping Gripen; Sollentuna HC; Valbo HC; Väsby IK; Visby/Roma HK; Wings HC Arlanda
