= Daniel Magnusson (ice hockey) =

Swedish ice hockey player

- Born: 30 January 1991 (age 34) Östersund, Sweden
- Height: 5 ft 10 in (178 cm)
- Weight: 176 lb (80 kg; 12 st 8 lb)
- Position: Centre
- Shoots: Left
- Hockeyettan team Former teams: Östersunds IK; Modo Hockey
- NHL draft: Undrafted
- Playing career: 2010–present

Daniel Magnusson is a Swedish professional ice hockey centre who plays for Östersunds IK of the Hockeyettan league. He previously played for Modo Hockey of the Elitserien.

== Career statistics ==
			Regular season					Playoffs
Season	Team	League	GP	G	A	Pts	PIM	GP	G	A	Pts	PIM
2006–07	Östersunds IK U16	U16 SM	3	4	1	5	4	—	—	—	—	—
2006–07	Östersunds IK J18	J18 Elit	24	19	14	33	42	—	—	—	—	—
2007–08	MODO Hockey J18	J18 Elit	18	8	19	27	12	—	—	—	—	—
2007–08	MODO Hockey J18	J18 Allsvenskan	14	8	7	15	20	—	—	—	—	—
2007–08	MODO Hockey J20	J20 SuperElit	—	—	—	—	—	1	0	0	0	0
2008–09	MODO Hockey J18	J18 Elit	12	5	16	21	24	—	—	—	—	—
2008–09	MODO Hockey J18	J18 Allsvenskan	8	2	5	7	6	4	0	1	1	6
2008–09	MODO Hockey J20	J20 SuperElit	38	6	13	19	16	5	0	2	2	6
2009–10	MODO Hockey J20	J20 SuperElit	41	17	40	57	82	3	0	3	3	6
2009–10	MODO Hockey	Elitserien	1	0	0	0	0	—	—	—	—	—
2010–11	MODO Hockey J20	J20 SuperElit	42	9	25	34	75	6	1	2	3	4
2010–11	Örnsköldsvik HF	Division 1	3	1	3	4	8	—	—	—	—	—
2011–12	Nynäshamns IF	Division 1	23	12	17	29	50	—	—	—	—	—
2011–12	Örnsköldsvik HF	Division 1	14	3	10	13	36	—	—	—	—	—
2012–13	Östersunds IK	Hockeyettan	37	20	27	47	18	—	—	—	—	—
2013–14	Östersunds IK	Hockeyettan	40	6	16	22	22	4	1	2	3	0
2014–15	Östersunds IK	Hockeyettan	34	7	9	16	32	5	3	2	5	0
2015–16	Östersunds IK	Hockeyettan	36	10	9	19	20	4	1	3	4	0
2016–17	Östersunds IK	Hockeyettan	40	3	12	15	53	—	—	—	—	—
2017–18	Östersunds IK	Hockeyettan	22	6	4	10	8	2	0	0	0	0
2018–19	Östersunds IK	Hockeyettan	38	12	11	23	12	4	3	1	4	2
2019–20	Östersunds IK	Hockeyettan	22	3	4	7	10	5	2	1	3	2
2020–21	Brunflo IK	Division 2	1	0	1	1	2	—	—	—	—	—
2021–22	Brunflo IK	Division 2	11	7	5	12	30	—	—	—	—	—
2023–24	Brunflo IK	Division 2	1	0	1	1	0	—	—	—	—	—
2024–25	Brunflo IK	Division 2	5	1	1	2	24	—	—	—	—	—
Elitserien totals			1	0	0	0	0	—	—	—	—	—
Division 1 (Hockeyettan) totals			309	83	122	205	269	24	10	9	19	4
