= Jesper Appel =

Swedish ice hockey player

- Born: January 23, 1993 (age 33) Karlstad, Sweden
- Height: 5 ft 10 in (178 cm)
- Weight: 176 lb (80 kg; 12 st 8 lb)
- Position: Defence
- Shot: Left
- Played for: Färjestads BK; Olofströms IK; Helsingborgs HC; Kiruna IF; Skövde IK; Grums IK; VIK Västerås HK
- NHL draft: Undrafted
- Playing career: 2011–2021

Jesper Appel (born January 23, 1993) is a Swedish professional ice hockey defenceman who currently plays for Färjestads BK in the Swedish Elitserien.

== Career statistics ==
| | | | Regular season | | | | | Playoffs |
| Season | Team | League | GP | G | A | Pts | PIM | GP | G | A | Pts | PIM |
|---|---|---|---|---|---|---|---|---|---|---|---|---|
| 2008–09 | Nor IK U16 | U16 SM | 8 | 0 | 3 | 3 | 8 | — | — | — | — | — |
| 2008–09 | Nor IK J18 | J18 Div. 1 | 14 | 1 | 4 | 5 | 16 | — | — | — | — | — |
| 2008–09 | Nor IK J20 | J20 Elit | 4 | 0 | 1 | 1 | 0 | — | — | — | — | — |
| 2009–10 | Leksands IF J18 | J18 Elit | 22 | 6 | 5 | 11 | 18 | — | — | — | — | — |
| 2009–10 | Leksands IF J18 | J18 Allsvenskan | 18 | 2 | 6 | 8 | 43 | 4 | 0 | 0 | 0 | 2 |
| 2010–11 | Leksands IF J18 | J18 Elit | 15 | 3 | 4 | 7 | 31 | — | — | — | — | — |
| 2010–11 | Leksands IF J18 | J18 Allsvenskan | 14 | 2 | 9 | 11 | 10 | 6 | 1 | 4 | 5 | 2 |
| 2010–11 | Leksands IF J20 | J20 SuperElit | 25 | 0 | 3 | 3 | 4 | — | — | — | — | — |
| 2011–12 | Färjestad BK J20 | J20 SuperElit | 50 | 7 | 19 | 26 | 38 | 6 | 0 | 1 | 1 | 2 |
| 2012–13 | Färjestad BK J20 | J20 SuperElit | 45 | 6 | 13 | 19 | 26 | 7 | 1 | 0 | 1 | 2 |
| 2012–13 | Färjestad BK | Elitserien | 1 | 0 | 0 | 0 | 0 | — | — | — | — | — |
| 2013–14 | Olofströms IK | Hockeyettan | 42 | 5 | 9 | 14 | 18 | — | — | — | — | — |
| 2014–15 | Helsingborgs HC | Hockeyettan | 35 | 3 | 5 | 8 | 14 | 3 | 0 | 0 | 0 | 6 |
| 2015–16 | Kiruna IF | Hockeyettan | 36 | 6 | 12 | 18 | 16 | 4 | 0 | 3 | 3 | 0 |
| 2016–17 | Skövde IK | Hockeyettan | 40 | 6 | 11 | 17 | 20 | 2 | 0 | 1 | 1 | 0 |
| 2017–18 | Grums IK | Hockeyettan | 31 | 4 | 15 | 19 | 30 | — | — | — | — | — |
| 2017–18 | VIK Västerås HK | Hockeyettan | 6 | 1 | 1 | 2 | 0 | 16 | 0 | 0 | 0 | 6 |
| 2018–19 | Västerås IK | HockeyAllsvenskan | 25 | 0 | 0 | 0 | 12 | 4 | 0 | 0 | 0 | 0 |
| 2018–19 | Grums IK | Hockeyettan | 13 | 0 | 5 | 5 | 6 | — | — | — | — | — |
| 2019–20 | Grums IK | Hockeyettan | 40 | 5 | 26 | 31 | 16 | — | — | — | — | — |
| 2020–21 | Grums IK | Hockeyettan | 21 | 5 | 4 | 9 | 47 | — | — | — | — | — |
| Elitserien totals | | | 1 | 0 | 0 | 0 | 0 | — | — | — | — | — |
| HockeyAllsvenskan totals | | | 25 | 0 | 0 | 0 | 12 | 4 | 0 | 0 | 0 | 0 |
| Hockeyettan totals | | | 264 | 35 | 88 | 123 | 167 | 25 | 0 | 4 | 4 | 12 |
