= David Gunnarsson =

Swedish ice hockey player

- Born: February 20, 1994 (age 31) Örnsköldsvik, Sweden
- Height: 5 ft 9 in (175 cm)
- Weight: 163 lb (74 kg; 11 st 9 lb)
- Position: Centre
- Shot: Right
- Div.1 team Former teams: Örnsköldsviks HF; Modo Hockey
- Playing career: 2012–2020

David Gunnarsson (born February 20, 1994) is a Swedish professional ice hockey center. He is currently playing with Örnsköldsviks HF of Division 1. He formerly played in the top tier Swedish Hockey League (SHL) with Modo Hockey.

Gunnarsson made his Elitserien (now the SHL) debut playing with Modo Hockey during the 2012–13 Elitserien season.

== Career statistics ==
			Regular season					Playoffs
Season	Team	League	GP	G	A	Pts	PIM	GP	G	A	Pts	PIM
2008–09	KB65 HK J18	J18 Div.1	14	3	13	16	6	—	—	—	—	—
2008–09	Örnsköldsviks SK J18	J18 Elit	12	3	3	6	6	—	—	—	—	—
2009–10	Örnsköldsviks SK J18	J18 Elit	28	16	19	35	20	—	—	—	—	—
2010–11	MODO Hockey J18	J18 Elit	17	6	30	36	14	—	—	—	—	—
2010–11	MODO Hockey J18	J18 Allsvenskan	12	1	13	14	2	3	1	2	3	0
2010–11	MODO Hockey J20	J20 SuperElit	17	2	4	6	8	6	0	0	0	8
2011–12	MODO Hockey J18	J18 Elit	5	3	7	10	2	—	—	—	—	—
2011–12	MODO Hockey J18	J18 Allsvenskan	6	0	4	4	2	1	0	0	0	2
2011–12	MODO Hockey J20	J20 SuperElit	38	9	16	25	14	8	1	2	3	2
2012–13	MODO Hockey J20	J20 SuperElit	21	2	12	14	8	4	1	1	2	0
2012–13	MODO Hockey	Elitserien	32	1	3	4	2	5	0	1	1	0
2013–14	MODO Hockey J20	J20 SuperElit	36	4	8	12	12	6	2	2	4	4
2013–14	MODO Hockey	SHL	11	0	0	0	0	—	—	—	—	—
2013–14	Timrå IK	HockeyAllsvenskan	3	0	0	0	0	—	—	—	—	—
2014–15	Örnsköldsvik HF	Hockeyettan	29	6	16	22	10	2	0	0	0	0
2015–16	Örnsköldsvik HF	Hockeyettan	26	7	23	30	12	2	1	1	2	0
2016–17	Örnsköldsvik HF	Hockeyettan	32	10	22	32	4	4	0	3	3	2
2017–18	Örnsköldsvik HF	Hockeyettan	26	2	9	11	14	—	—	—	—	—
2018–19	Örnsköldsvik HF	Hockeyettan	27	7	21	28	8	—	—	—	—	—
2019–20	Svedjeholmens IF	Division 3	5	—	—	—	—	—	—	—	—	—
SHL (Elitserien) totals			43	1	3	4	2	5	0	1	1	0
Hockeyettan totals			140	32	91	123	48	8	1	4	5	2
