= 1991–92 Division 1 season (Swedish ice hockey) =

- League: Division 1
- Sport: Ice hockey
- Number of teams: 40
- Promoted to Division 1: Rögle BK to Elitserien
- Relegated to Division 2: Lejonströms SK; HC Dobel; IFK Tumba; Helsingborgs HC

Division 1 seasons
- ← 1990–91 1992–93 →

1991-92 was the 17th season that Division 1 operated as the second tier of ice hockey in Sweden, below the top-flight Elitserien (now the SHL).

== Format ==
Division 1 was divided into four starting groups of 10 teams each. The top two teams in each group qualified for the Allsvenskan, while the remaining eight teams had to compete in a qualifying round. The teams were given zero to seven bonus points based on their finish in the first round. The top two teams from each qualifying round qualified for the playoffs. The last-place team in each of the qualifying groups was relegated directly to Division 2, while the second-to-last-place team had to play in a relegation series.

Of the 10 teams in the Allsvenskan - in addition to the eight participants from Division 1, the two last place teams from the Elitserien also participated - the top two teams qualified directly for the Allsvenskan final, from which the winner was promoted directly to the Elitserien (now the SHL). The second place team qualified for the Kvalserien, which offered another opportunity to be promoted. The third-and fourth-place teams in the Allsvenskan qualified for the third round of the playoffs, while teams that finished fifth through eighth played in the second round. The three playoff winners qualified for the Kvalserien, in which the first-place team qualified for the following Elitserien season.

== Regular season ==
=== Northern Group ===
==== First round ====
	Club	GP	W	T	L	GF	GA	Pts
1.	IF Sundsvall/Timrå IK	18	15	1	2	121	32	31
2.	IF Björklöven	18	14	3	1	96	24	31
3.	Skellefteå AIK	18	11	4	3	75	36	26
4.	Bodens IK	18	12	1	5	89	41	25
5.	Husums IF	18	7	3	8	68	69	17
6.	Kiruna IF	18	7	2	9	69	83	16
7.	Piteå HC	18	6	0	12	39	72	12
8.	Vännäs HC	18	4	2	12	40	73	10
9.	Lejonströms SK	18	3	1	14	40	128	7
10.	Tegs SK	18	2	1	15	42	121	5

==== Qualification round ====
	Club	GP	W	T	L	GF	GA	Pts (Bonus)
1.	Bodens IK	14	11	1	2	70	29	29(6)
2.	Skellefteå AIK	14	8	2	4	71	46	25(7)
3.	Kiruna IF	14	9	2	3	74	47	24(4)
4.	Husums IF	14	6	3	5	62	50	20(5)
5.	Vännäs HC	14	6	0	8	56	71	14(2)
6.	Piteå HC	14	4	3	7	41	61	14(3)
7.	Tegs SK	14	3	2	9	48	76	8(0)
8.	Lejonströms SK	14	2	1	11	45	87	6(1)

=== Western Group ===
==== First round ====
	Club	GP	W	T	L	GF	GA	Pts
1.	Mora IK	18	10	5	3	73	37	25
2.	Uppsala AIS	18	10	3	5	84	57	23
3.	Örebro IK	18	9	4	5	79	57	22
4.	Gävle HF	18	9	4	5	80	63	22
5.	Väsby IK	18	9	3	6	69	57	21
6.	Grums IK	18	8	3	7	77	69	19
7.	Arvika HC	18	7	1	10	61	68	15
8.	Arlanda HC	18	6	3	9	70	80	15
9.	HC Dobel	18	5	1	12	54	91	11
10.	Bofors IK	18	3	1	14	53	121	7

==== Qualification round ====
	Club	GP	W	T	L	GF	GA	Pts (Bonus)
1.	Örebro IK	14	8	5	1	58	39	28(7)
2.	Gävle HF	14	10	1	3	74	49	27(6)
3.	Väsby IK	14	9	2	3	64	40	25(5)
4.	Grums IK	14	8	3	3	69	43	23(4)
5.	Arlanda HC	14	7	1	6	59	56	17(2)
6.	Arvika HC	14	3	2	9	51	64	11(3)
7.	Bofors IK	14	2	1	11	49	88	5(0)
8.	HC Dobel	14	1	1	12	36	81	4(1)

=== Eastern Group ===
==== First round ====
	Club	GP	W	T	L	GF	GA	Pts
1.	Huddinge IK	18	16	1	1	118	45	33
2.	Hammarby IF	18	13	2	3	98	46	28
3.	IK Westmannia Köping	18	9	4	5	71	56	22
4.	Nacka HK	18	7	6	5	53	49	20
5.	IK Tälje	18	8	2	8	75	75	18
6.	Nyköpings NH 90	18	6	5	7	55	77	17
7.	Roma IF	18	5	3	10	51	71	13
8.	IFK Tumba	18	4	3	11	45	88	11
9.	IFK Tunadal	18	4	2	12	57	76	10
10.	Danderyd/Täby	18	3	2	13	45	85	8

==== Qualification round ====
	Club	GP	W	T	L	GF	GA	Pts (Bonus)
1.	IK Westmannia Köping	14	8	4	2	77	40	27(7)
2.	Nacka HK	14	8	2	4	50	36	24(6)
3.	IK Tälje	14	5	4	5	57	52	19(5)
4.	Nyköpings NH 90	14	7	1	6	43	44	19(4)
5.	Roma IF	14	6	2	6	51	53	17(3)
6.	Danderyd/Täby	14	7	1	6	52	49	15(0)
7.	IFK Tunadal	14	4	1	9	42	69	10(1)
8.	IFK Tumba	14	3	1	10	35	64	9(2)

=== Southern Group ===
==== First round ====
	Club	GP	W	T	L	GF	GA	Pts
1.	Rögle BK	18	17	0	1	132	33	34
2.	IF Troja-Ljungby	18	12	2	4	104	56	26
3.	IK Vita Hästen	18	11	2	5	79	52	24
4.	Boro HC	18	10	0	8	90	77	20
5.	Mölndals IF	18	8	1	9	82	84	17
6.	Hanhals HF	18	7	3	8	73	88	17
7.	Tyringe SoSS	18	7	2	9	79	96	16
8.	Mörrums GoIS	18	5	2	11	72	112	12
9.	Helsingborgs HC	18	5	1	12	65	98	11
10.	Borås HC	18	1	1	16	45	125	3

==== Qualification round ====
	Club	GP	W	T	L	GF	GA	Pts (Bonus)
1.	IK Vita Hästen	14	10	2	2	84	38	29(7)
2.	Boro HC	14	10	1	3	79	41	27(6)
3.	Hanhals HF	14	10	2	2	70	37	26(4)
4.	Mölndals IF	14	6	1	7	53	67	18(5)
5.	Mörrums GoIS	14	3	3	8	45	58	11(2)
6.	Tyringe SoSS	14	3	2	9	45	72	11(3)
7.	Borås HC	14	5	0	9	41	62	10(0)
8.	Helsingborgs HC	14	3	1	10	43	85	8(1)

== Allsvenskan ==
	Club	GP	W	T	L	GF	GA	Pts
1.	Rögle BK	18	13	2	3	87	41	28
2.	Leksands IF	18	11	3	4	77	50	25
3.	IF Björklöven	18	11	1	6	75	53	23
4.	Södertälje SK	18	9	4	5	68	42	22
5.	Mora IK	18	9	3	6	66	53	21
6.	Huddinge IK	18	7	3	8	55	69	17
7.	Hammarby IF	18	7	0	11	58	73	14
8.	IF Troja-Ljungby	18	5	3	10	54	68	13
9.	IF Sundsvall/Timrå IK	18	5	3	10	57	78	13
10.	Uppsala AIS	18	2	0	16	38	108	4

=== Final ===
- Rögle BK - Leksands IF 3:2 (2:3, 4:3, 5:2, 2:4, 4:3 OT)

== Playoffs ==
=== First round ===
- Bodens IK - Gävle HF 2:0 (3:2, 7:3)
- Örebro IK - Skellefteå AIK 2:1 (2:3, 2:1, 3:2 OT)
- IK Westmannia Köping - Boro HC 4:2/2:5
- IK Vita Hästen - Nacka HK 2:0 (5:1, 3:2 OT)

=== Second round ===
- Mora IK - IK Vita Hästen 0:2 (2:5, 2:5)
- Huddinge IK - Bodens IK 2:0 (4:3, 6:3)
- Hammarby IF - Boro HC 0:2 (2:4, 1:4)
- IF Troja-Ljungby - Örebro IK 0:2 (4:6, 2:3)

=== Third round ===
- IF Björklöven - IK Vita Hästen 1:2 (6:3, 0:4, 0:5)
- Södertälje SK - Örebro IK 2:0 (5:0, 3:2 OT)
- Boro HC - Huddinge IK 2:0 (3:2, 4:3)
