= Hammarby Hockey =

Hammarby IF
- City: Stockholm, Sweden
- League: Hockeytvåan (as of the 2024–25 season)
- Division: East
- Founded: 2008
- Home arena: Kärrtorps IP, Zinkensdamm IP
- Colours: Green, white
- Head coach: (Sweden) Fredrik Mälberg
- Website: www.hammarbyhockey.se

Franchise history
- 2008–13: Bajen Fans IF
- 2013–: Hammarby IF

Previous franchise history
- 1921–2008: Hammarby IF
- Swedish champions: 1932, 1933, 1936, 1937, 1942, 1943, 1945, 1951

Hammarby IF Ishockeyförening ("Hammarby IF Ice Hockey Club", or simply Hammarby Hockey) is an ice hockey club founded as "Bajen Fans IF" in 2008 by supporters of the previous incarnation of Hammarby Hockey which went bankrupt that same year. The club plays in Hockeytvåan, the fourth tier of Swedish men's ice hockey, since the 2021–22 season.

In its first five seasons, the club was promoted three times. Prior to the 2013–14 season, the club had failed only once to achieve promotion to a higher league in the Swedish ice hockey system when it was available, as league restructuring prior to the 2010–11 season prevented their immediate rise to Division 2 for that season. Given this success, the club chose to rejoin the Hammarby IF umbrella organization and retake the name "Hammarby IF". This change was approved on 30 May 2013.

The club currently uses rinks at Kärrtorps IP (men's team) and Zinkensdamm IP (women's team) after previously playing at SDC-hallen. The club has also previously played one-off games at Hovet, the 8,094-seat arena which the former Hammarby Hockey for many years called their home arena.

Even before its bankruptcy, Hammarby Hockey was searching for a place to run all of its professional and youth programs under one roof. That search continues for the new Hammarby Hockey club, which has suggested to municipal authorities to build its own rink in the southern suburb of Kärrtorp, to avoid the difficulties of sharing ice time with many other clubs in other places.

Supporter clubs of Hammarby Hockey include Bajen Fans, Bamsingarna, Ultra Boys, Hammarby Ultras, Söder Bröder, and Bara Bajare.

== Overview ==
=== Previous Hammarby hockey club ===
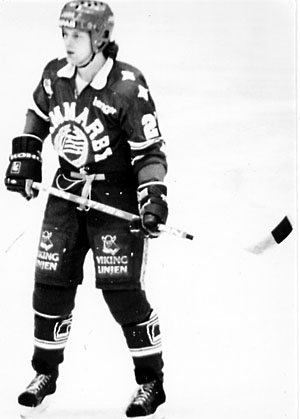
Orvar Stambert, who played for the original Hammarby Hockey 1978–1983

Hammarby IF began playing ice hockey in February 1921, though at first the hockey team consisted of members of Hammarby's bandy club. That club would become a giant in early Swedish ice hockey, winning the Swedish championships 8 times (1932, 1933, 1936, 1937, 1942, 1943, 1945, 1951) and playing 42 seasons in Sweden's highest hockey league (most recently 1984–85). The club through its entire history played in the first two tiers of Swedish ice hockey. Hammarby's final season before the bankruptcy in 2008 was played in HockeyAllsvenskan.

In the 2000s, the club flirted with demotion from HockeyAllsvenskan several times. They had experienced arena-trouble, as Hovet was becoming too expensive. In October 2007, the club had racked up a debt of over 4 million SEK. By February 2008, the choice was to play in the third-tier league or file for bankruptcy, as the club was in a demotion spot in the standings and they announced that they were in no position to participate in the Kvalserien tournament to defend their spot in HockeyAllsvenskan. At that point, Nacka HK, a hockey club from the nearby Stockholm suburb of Nacka, was considering joining the Hammarby IF organization. Hammarby IF Hockey declared bankruptcy on 14 April 2008, after 87 years of hockey under the name of "Hammarby IF". At the same time, a group of supporters were planning on starting a new hockey club named "Bajen Hockey IF", that would rebuild from the bottom of the Swedish hockey system.

=== Bajen Fans IF ===
Bajen Fans IF logo (2008–2013). A patch with the original logo will continue to appear on the club's jerseys in the future.

The idea of saving Hammarby's hockey legacy by starting a new supporter-based club was started during a car ride home from one of Hammarby's last away matches. The club began play in the 2008–09 season, starting in the Division 4, the lowest tier of Swedish ice hockey for men. Bajen Fans Hockey won 15 out of 16 games in their inaugural season and quickly promoted to the Division 3 as they won their division. The team spent their inaugural Division 3 season, 2009–10, in the Stockholm södra (southern) section. The team won all their 24 games and thus ended first in their section, which would have meant a promotion to division 3 A. For quite some years division 3 in practical terms had been divided into "two divisions in one", consisting of division 3 A with the twelve best teams and division 3 north and south with twelve more teams each below, with promotion and relegation in between. This was, however, the last season with this system. Had it been kept, Bajen Fans would have been promoted to the division 3 A, but due to this league restructuring the remaining (fewer) teams in the league were now only to be divided into a north and a south section, with Bajen Fans now in the northern one. The team once again won all their games and also their section, and as a result, they reached the 2011 Kvalserien qualification tournament for the Division 2. With 4 wins and an undefeated streak in 6 games, the team promoted to the fourth-tier league Division 2 prior to the 2011–12 season. The team was placed in the Stockholm södra section of the Division 2. They failed to promote to the third-tier Division 1 in 2011–12, but managed to do so in the 2012–13 season.

=== Hammarby IF ===
Following the successful promotion to Division 1, the level of hockey which the former Hammarby club would have been playing following the bankruptcy, the club rejoined the Hammarby IF umbrella organization and retook the name "Hammarby Hockey" in May 2013. The club's first season back in upper-tier hockey playing as Hammarby finished modestly, with a 7th-place finish in the 10-team group D in the autumn, followed by a 3rd-place finish in the 6-team spring series. The team managed to avoid relegation in a season which saw Division 1 contract from 53 to 47 teams.

In the 2014 off-season, Division 1 was reorganized as Hockeyettan. Hammarby started their inaugural season of Hockeyettan East in the gutter with 2 points in their first 5 games, and just 2 wins in their first 13 games. This included a 4–2 opening night loss to Visby/Roma HK at Hovet in front of 3,482 spectators. The team finished strongly however with four straight regulation wins to finish 9th of 12 teams, with an 8–3–11 record.

=== Bajenkvällen ===
Starting immediately after the bankruptcy and the formation of Bajen Fans IF, the club has played occasional games at Hovet (known as "Bajenkvällen"), the former Hammarby Hockey's home arena.

Date	Opponent	Result	Attendance	Ref.
2009–02–20	Flemingsbergs IK	Win 7–1 (2–1, 5–0, 0–0)	4,220	
2010–02–26	Västerhaninge IF	Win 10–2 (2–0, 4–2, 4–0)	4,895	
2011–02–27	Östervåla IF	Win 12–4 (2–1, 6–1, 4–2)	5,085	
2012–02–03	MB Hockey	Loss 1–3 (0–1, 1–1, 0–1)	8,094	
2013–02–02	Sollentuna HC	Loss 1–2 (1–0, 0–0, 0–2)	7,717	
2014–01–31	IFK Tumba Hockey	Loss 3–5 (0–3, 2–1, 1–1)	5,942	
2015–02–07	Väsby IK	Loss 2–4 (2–1, 0–1, 0–2)	4,682	
2016–01–30	Sollentuna HC	Win 2–1 (0–0, 1–1, 1–0)	3,054	
2017–01–28	IF Vallentuna BK	Win 4–1 (1–0, 2–1, 1–0)	3,187	
2018–01–27	Nyköping Gripen	Win 3–2 (1–1, 1–1, 0–0, 0–0, 1–0)	3,187	
2020–02–01	Enköpings SK HK	Loss 1–3 (0–0, 1–2, 0–1)	2,105	

== Season-by-season ==
Year	Level	Division	Record		Avg. home atnd.	Notes	Ref.
Year	Level	Division	Position	W-T-L W-OT-L	Avg. home atnd.	Notes	Ref.
2008–09	Tier 7	Division 4 Västra	1st	15–0–1		▲ Promoted to Division 3	
2009–10	Tier 6	Division 3 Södra	1st	24–0–0		League restructuring: Hammarby promoted to Division 3A, which was abolished prior to 2010–11	
2010–11	Tier 5	Division 3 Norra	1st	22–0–0			
2010–11	Division 2 qualifier		1st	4–2–0	292	▲ Promoted to Division 2	
2011–12	Tier 4	Division 2 Södra	1st	9–1–2–2	231		
2011–12	Tier 4	Alltvåan	3rd	11–1–3–6	1,015 (307^{a})		
2011–12	Division 1 qualifier D		3rd	1–1–1–3	249		
2012–13	Tier 4	Division 2 Södra	1st	11–1–1–1	220		
2012–13	Tier 4	Alltvåan	3rd	12–1–3–5	919 (239^{a})		
2012–13	Division 1 qualifier D		1st	5–0–1–0	350	▲ Promoted to Division 1	
2013–14	Tier 3	Division 1D	7th	9–1–2–15	302	First season as "Hammarby Hockey"	
2013–14	Tier 3	1D continuation	3rd	8–1–2–4	910 (191^{a})		
2014–15	Tier 3	Hockeyettan East	9th of 12	8–1–2–11	530 (234^{a})		
2014–15	Tier 3	Hockeyettan East (spring)	5th of 8	6–0–1–7	901 (271^{a})		
2015–16	Tier 3	Hockeyettan East	6th of 12	9–1–4–8	328 (225^{a})		
2015–16	Tier 3	Hockeyettan East (spring)	2nd of 8	10–0–1–3	602 (194^{a})		
2015–16	Tier 3	Hockeyettan playoffs	—	0–2	500	Eliminated in round 1 by IF Troja/Ljungby (0–2 in games)	
2016–17	Tier 3	Hockeyettan East	6th of 12	11–2–1–8	165		
2016–17	Tier 3	Hockeyettan East (spring)	4th of 7	6–0–1–5	646 (138^{a})		
2017–18	Tier 3	Hockeyettan East	8th of 12	7-2–1–12	188		
2017–18	Tier 3	Hockeyettan East (spring)	1st of 7	7–1–1–3	751 (189^{a})		
2017–18	Tier 3	Playoff to Allsvenskan qualifiers	—	1–2	469	Eliminated in prequalifier by Tranås AIF IF (1–2 in games)	
2018–19	Tier 3	Hockeyettan East	10th of 12	8–0–1–13	235		
2018–19	Tier 3	Hockeyettan East (spring)	3rd of 7	9–2–1–6	222		
2019–20	Tier 3	Hockeyettan East	12th of 12	3–1–3–15	148		
2019–20	Tier 3	Hockeyettan East (spring)	7th of 7	6–0–0–12	363		
2019–20	Hockeyettan qualifiers			1–3–0–1	NA	Abandoned due to COVID-19 pandemic	
2020–21	Tier 3	Hockeyettan East	12th of 12	2–2–1–17	18		
2020–21	Tier 3	Hockeyettan East (spring)	7th of 7	4–2–3–9	8		
2020–21	Hockeyettan qualifiers		4th of 4	0–1–1–4	8	▼ Relegated to Division 2	
2021–22	Tier 4	HockeyTvåan Östra B	2nd of 9	9–2–1–4	116		
2021–22	Tier 4	Alltvåan Östra	7th of 8	3–1–0–10	86		
2022–23	Tier 4	HockeyTvåan Östra B	7th of 10	6–1–0–11	120		
2022–23	Tier 4	Hockeytvåan Östra B continuation	3rd of 6	8–0–2–5	110		
2023–24	Tier 4	HockeyTvåan Östra	10th of 16	13–1–0–16	100		
2023–24	Tier 4	Playoffs to Hockeyettan qualifiers	—	0–0–0–2	150	Lost 0–2 in games to Nacka HK	
2024–25	Tier 4	HockeyTvåan Östra	10th of 16	14–0–3–13	120		
2024–25	Tier 4	Playoffs to Hockeyettan qualifiers	–	1–0–0–2	114	Lost 1–2 in games to Värmdö HC	

a. Only matches in LW-Hallen, i.e. excluding matches played in Hovet
