= Fredrik Sonntag =

Swedish ice hockey player

- Born: April 2, 1987 (age 39) Nynäshamn, Sweden
- Height: 6 ft 1 in (185 cm)
- Weight: 205 lb (93 kg; 14 st 9 lb)
- Position: Defence
- Shot: Left
- Played for: Södertälje SK; Huddinge IK; Timrå IK; IF Sundsvall Hockey; Almtuna IS; Åker/Strängnäs HC
- Playing career: 2005–2018

Fredrik Sonntag is a Swedish professional ice hockey defenceman who currently plays for Timrå IK of the Elitserien.

== Career statistics ==
			Regular season					Playoffs
Season	Team	League	GP	G	A	Pts	PIM	GP	G	A	Pts	PIM
2002–03	Nynäshamns IF U16	U16 SM	3	0	2	2	4	—	—	—	—	—
2003–04	Södertälje SK J18	J18 Allsvenskan	4	0	0	0	4	2	0	0	0	0
2003–04	Södertälje SK J20	J20 SuperElit	26	2	5	7	4	2	0	0	0	0
2004–05	Södertälje SK J18	J18 Allsvenskan	1	0	1	1	2	1	0	0	0	0
2004–05	Södertälje SK J20	U20 Nationell	34	6	7	13	20	3	0	0	0	2
2005–06	Södertälje SK J20	J20 SuperElit	41	2	5	7	30	4	0	0	0	0
2005–06	Södertälje SK	Elitserien	1	0	0	0	0	—	—	—	—	—
2006–07	Södertälje SK J20	J20 SuperElit	26	3	12	15	55	3	0	1	1	2
2006–07	Södertälje SK	HockeyAllsvenskan	37	0	0	0	25	—	—	—	—	—
2007–08	Södertälje SK J20	J20 SuperElit	10	4	2	6	10	—	—	—	—	—
2007–08	Södertälje SK	Elitserien	7	0	0	0	0	—	—	—	—	—
2007–08	Huddinge IK	HockeyAllsvenskan	13	1	1	2	10	—	—	—	—	—
2008–09	Södertälje SK J20	J20 SuperElit	1	0	1	1	2	—	—	—	—	—
2008–09	Södertälje SK	Elitserien	19	0	0	0	0	—	—	—	—	—
2008–09	Huddinge IK	HockeyAllsvenskan	39	6	11	17	28	—	—	—	—	—
2009–10	Timrå IK	Elitserien	22	2	1	3	4	4	0	1	1	0
2010–11	Timrå IK	Elitserien	47	1	0	1	20	—	—	—	—	—
2010–11	IF Sundsvall Hockey	HockeyAllsvenskan	2	0	0	0	0	—	—	—	—	—
2011–12	Södertälje SK	HockeyAllsvenskan	50	2	5	7	30	—	—	—	—	—
2012–13	Södertälje SK	HockeyAllsvenskan	29	0	5	5	12	9	0	3	3	10
2013–14	Södertälje SK	HockeyAllsvenskan	38	2	2	4	30	—	—	—	—	—
2014–15	Almtuna IS	HockeyAllsvenskan	7	0	0	0	10	—	—	—	—	—
2015–16	Åker/Strängnäs HC	Hockeyettan	31	0	17	17	18	2	0	0	0	2
2016–17	Åker/Strängnäs HC	Hockeyettan	33	1	5	6	68	—	—	—	—	—
2017–18	Åker/Strängnäs HC	Division 2	32	4	8	12	10	—	—	—	—	—
Elitserien totals			96	3	1	4	24	4	0	1	1	0
HockeyAllsvenskan totals			215	11	24	35	145	9	0	3	3	10
