= Tommi Juntunen =

Swedish-Finnish ice hockey player

- Born: 17 March 1993 (age 32) Gothenburg, Sweden
- Height: 6 ft 0 in (183 cm)
- Weight: 165 lb (75 kg; 11 st 11 lb)
- Position: Defence
- Shot: Right
- Played for: Frölunda HC; Tingsryds AIF; Varberg HK; IK Pantern; Kallinge-Ronneby IF; Partille HK
- NHL draft: Undrafted
- Playing career: 2012–2019

Tommi Juntunen (born 17 March 1993) is a Swedish ice hockey defenceman, who also holds a Finnish citizenship. He made his Elitserien debut playing with Frölunda HC during the 2012–13 Elitserien season.

Juntunen was born to Finnish parents.

== Career statistics ==
| | | | Regular season | | | | | Playoffs |
| Season | Team | League | GP | G | A | Pts | PIM | GP | G | A | Pts | PIM |
|---|---|---|---|---|---|---|---|---|---|---|---|---|
| 2008–09 | Frölunda HC U16 | U16 SM | 3 | 0 | 1 | 1 | 0 | — | — | — | — | — |
| 2008–09 | Frölunda HC J18 | J18 Allsvenskan | 1 | 0 | 0 | 0 | 0 | — | — | — | — | — |
| 2009–10 | Frölunda HC J18 | J18 Elit | 22 | 3 | 4 | 7 | 2 | — | — | — | — | — |
| 2009–10 | Frölunda HC J18 | J18 Allsvenskan | 18 | 1 | 5 | 6 | 2 | 8 | 1 | 2 | 3 | 2 |
| 2010–11 | Frölunda HC J18 | J18 Elit | 13 | 5 | 4 | 9 | 8 | — | — | — | — | — |
| 2010–11 | Frölunda HC J18 | J18 Allsvenskan | 11 | 0 | 5 | 5 | 4 | 5 | 0 | 2 | 2 | 6 |
| 2010–11 | Frölunda HC J20 | J20 SuperElit | 28 | 1 | 6 | 7 | 8 | 2 | 0 | 0 | 0 | 0 |
| 2011–12 | Frölunda HC J20 | J20 SuperElit | 47 | 5 | 12 | 17 | 6 | 2 | 0 | 0 | 0 | 0 |
| 2012–13 | Frölunda HC J20 | J20 SuperElit | 40 | 10 | 20 | 30 | 20 | 6 | 1 | 0 | 1 | 0 |
| 2012–13 | Frölunda HC | Elitserien | 2 | 0 | 0 | 0 | 0 | — | — | — | — | — |
| 2013–14 | Tingsryds AIF | Hockeyettan | 42 | 3 | 9 | 12 | 6 | 17 | 1 | 3 | 4 | 2 |
| 2014–15 | Varberg HK | Hockeyettan | 35 | 2 | 11 | 13 | 4 | — | — | — | — | — |
| 2015–16 | IK Pantern | HockeyAllsvenskan | 46 | 2 | 5 | 7 | 6 | — | — | — | — | — |
| 2016–17 | IK Pantern | HockeyAllsvenskan | 35 | 0 | 1 | 1 | 12 | 4 | 0 | 1 | 1 | 0 |
| 2016–17 | Kallinge-Ronneby IF | Hockeyettan | 1 | 0 | 0 | 0 | 0 | — | — | — | — | — |
| 2017–18 | Partille HK | Division 3 | 23 | 18 | 27 | 45 | 10 | — | — | — | — | — |
| 2018–19 | Partille HK | Division 3 | 22 | 17 | 29 | 46 | 2 | — | — | — | — | — |
| Elitserien totals | | | 2 | 0 | 0 | 0 | 0 | — | — | — | — | — |
| HockeyAllsvenskan totals | | | 81 | 2 | 6 | 8 | 18 | 4 | 0 | 1 | 1 | 0 |
| Hockeyettan totals | | | 78 | 5 | 20 | 25 | 10 | 17 | 1 | 3 | 4 | 2 |
