= Stefan Bemström =

Swedish ice hockey player

- Born: 1 March 1972 (age 53); Södertälje, SWE
- Height: 5 ft 8 in (173 cm)
- Weight: 185 lb (84 kg; 13 st 3 lb)
- Position: Defence
- Shot: Left
- SEL team Former teams: Södertälje SK; Leksands IF
- Playing career: 1991–2012

Stefan Bemström (born 1 March 1972) is a Swedish retired professional ice hockey who mostly played with the Södertälje SK team in the Swedish Elitserien league.

== Career statistics ==
| | | | Regular season | | | | | Playoffs |
| Season | Team | League | GP | G | A | Pts | PIM | GP | G | A | Pts | PIM |
|---|---|---|---|---|---|---|---|---|---|---|---|---|
| 1990–91 | Södertälje SK | SHL | 2 | 0 | 0 | 0 | 0 | — | — | — | — | — |
| 1990–91 | IK Tälje | Division 1 | 28 | 1 | 4 | 5 | 10 | — | — | — | — | — |
| 1991–92 | IK Tälje | Division 1 | 29 | 3 | 12 | 15 | 20 | — | — | — | — | — |
| 1992–93 | Södertälje SK | Division 1 | 23 | 2 | 3 | 5 | 4 | 2 | 0 | 0 | 0 | 0 |
| 1993–94 | Södertälje SK | Division 1 | 36 | 5 | 8 | 13 | 28 | 3 | 0 | 0 | 0 | 0 |
| 1994–95 | Södertälje SK | Division 1 | 32 | 3 | 7 | 10 | 16 | 3 | 1 | 1 | 2 | 2 |
| 1995–96 | Södertälje SK | Division 1 | 35 | 5 | 7 | 12 | 26 | 4 | 2 | 1 | 3 | 2 |
| 1996–97 | Södertälje SK | SHL | 43 | 1 | 2 | 3 | 18 | 10 | 0 | 4 | 4 | 10 |
| 1997–98 | Södertälje SK | SHL | 36 | 0 | 0 | 0 | 20 | 5 | 0 | 0 | 0 | 4 |
| 1998–99 | Timrå IK | Division 1 | 36 | 6 | 14 | 20 | 26 | 2 | 1 | 2 | 3 | 2 |
| 1999–00 | Södertälje SK | Allsvenskan | 44 | 11 | 21 | 32 | 45 | 10 | 0 | 6 | 6 | 2 |
| 2000–01 | Södertälje SK | Allsvenskan | 40 | 18 | 13 | 31 | 34 | 10 | 2 | 3 | 5 | 8 |
| 2001–02 | Södertälje SK | SHL | 50 | 3 | 11 | 14 | 8 | — | — | — | — | — |
| 2002–03 | Södertälje SK | SHL | 50 | 6 | 14 | 20 | 10 | — | — | — | — | — |
| 2003–04 | Södertälje SK | SHL | 39 | 2 | 4 | 6 | 16 | — | — | — | — | — |
| 2004–05 | Leksands IF | Allsvenskan | 45 | 5 | 7 | 12 | 18 | 9 | 0 | 0 | 0 | 4 |
| 2005–06 | Leksands IF | SHL | 48 | 1 | 7 | 8 | 55 | 9 | 1 | 0 | 1 | 6 |
| 2006–07 | Södertälje SK | Allsvenskan | 44 | 6 | 26 | 32 | 22 | 10 | 1 | 5 | 6 | 8 |
| 2007–08 | Södertälje SK | SHL | 52 | 4 | 19 | 23 | 22 | — | — | — | — | — |
| 2008–09 | Södertälje SK | SHL | 55 | 2 | 16 | 18 | 22 | 10 | 2 | 8 | 10 | 12 |
| 2009–10 | Södertälje SK | SHL | 49 | 1 | 10 | 11 | 20 | 10 | 1 | 2 | 3 | 4 |
| 2010–11 | Södertälje SK | SHL | 53 | 1 | 5 | 6 | 28 | 10 | 0 | 1 | 1 | 0 |
| 2011–12 | Södertälje SK | Allsvenskan | 19 | 0 | 2 | 2 | 8 | — | — | — | — | — |
| SHL totals | | | 477 | 21 | 88 | 109 | 219 | 54 | 4 | 15 | 19 | 36 |
