= Daniel Magnusson =

Daniel Magnusson may refer to:

- Daniel Magnusson (ice hockey), Swedish ice hockey centre
- Daniel Magnusson (curler), Swedish curler
