= Juntunen =

Juntunen is a Finnish surname. Notable people with the surname include:

- Paul Juntunen (also known as Paul Jayson; 1921–2004), American professional basketball player
- Craig Juntunen (born 1954), American player of Canadian football
- Jani Juntunen, Finnish radio host
- Helena Juntunen (born 1976), Finnish opera singer
- Tommi Juntunen (born 1993), Swedish ice hockey player
