= Haninge Anchors HC =

Swedish ice hockey club

- City: Haninge, Stockholm, Sweden
- League: Hockeyettan
- Division: East
- Founded: 2013
- Home arena: Torvalla Ishall (capacity 1000)
- Colors: Dark red, blue, white, black
- Head coach: (Sweden) Niklas Flodin
- Website: Official website

Franchise history
- 2013–present: Haninge Anchors HC

Haninge Anchors HC is a Swedish ice hockey club located in Haninge. The club will play the 2014–15 season in group East of Hockeyettan, the third tier of Swedish ice hockey. The club plays its home games in Torvalla Ishall, which has a capacity of 1000 spectators.

Haninge Anchors HC was founded in May 2013 as a merger of the Haninge-based clubs Haninge HF, Vendelsö IK and Västerhaninge IF. Haninge Anchors HC began play in the 2013–14 season of Division 2, the league where Haninge HF left off at the time of the merger. The newly formed club quickly promoted to the third-tier league Hockeyettan in its first season, and will make their first Hockeyettan season in 2014–15.
