= Varberg Vipers =

- City: Varberg, Halland, Sweden
- League: Hockeytrean Södra B
- Division: South
- Founded: 1981
- Home arena: Varbergs Ishall (capacity 544)
- Colors: Black, white, red
- Head coach: (Sweden)
- Website: Official website

Franchise history
- 1981–2011: Varberg Hockey
- 2011–present: Varberg Vipers

The Varberg Vipers, also known as Varberg Hockey or Varberg HK, is a Swedish ice hockey club located in Varberg. The club will play the 2014–15 season in group South of Hockeyettan, the third tier of Swedish ice hockey. The club plays its home games in Varbergs Ishall, which has a capacity of 544 spectators.
