= Åker/Strängnäs HC =

- City: Strängnäs, Södermanland, Sweden
- League: Hockeytrean
- Division: East
- Founded: 2012
- Home arena: Åkers Ishall (capacity 1500)
- Colors: Black, white, brown
- Website: Official website

Franchise history
- 2012–present: Åker/Strängnäs HC

Åker/Strängnäs HC is a Swedish ice hockey club located in Strängnäs. The club played the 2014–15 season in group East of Hockeyettan, the third tier of Swedish ice hockey. The club plays its home games in Åkers Ishall, which has a capacity of 1500 spectators. The club was founded in 2012 as a merger of Åkers IF's ice hockey section and Strängnäs HC.
