= Ljungby Arena =

Ice rink in Ljungby, Kronoberg county

Coordinates: 56.8407°N 13.9499°E

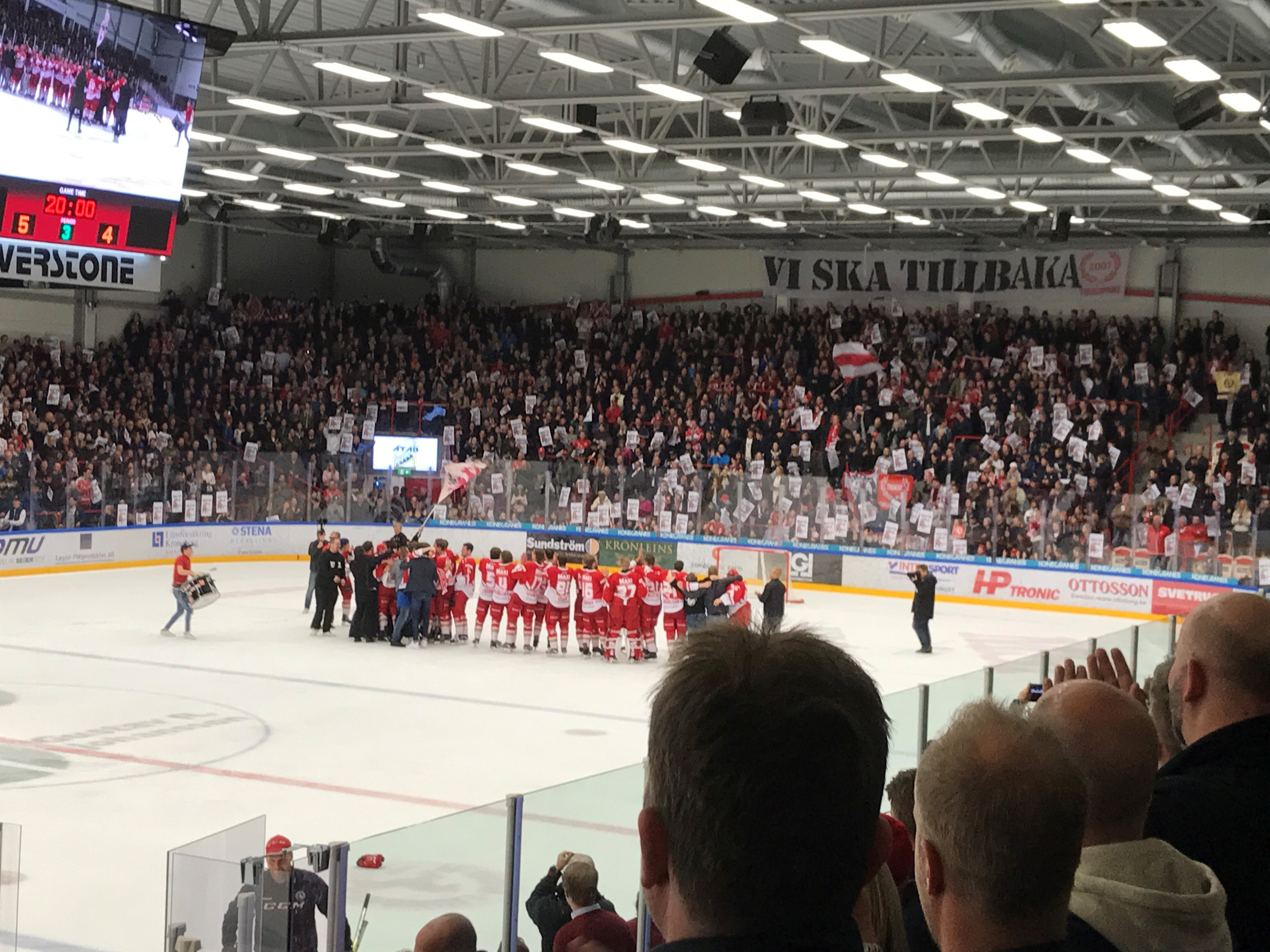
Interior of Ljungby Arena

Ljungby Arena, previously named Sunnerbohov, is an indoor arena located in Ljungby, Sweden. It is IF Troja/Ljungby's home arena and has a capacity of 3,500 spectators. The current spectator record was set on 21 January 1997, when 4,050 spectators visited to see IF Troja/Ljungby meet Brynäs IF.
