= HC Dalen =

- City: Jönköping, Småland, Sweden
- League: Hockeyettan
- Division: South
- Founded: 3 September 1966
- Home arena: Smedjehov Norrahammar (capacity 1900)
- Colors: Black, Red, Yellow
- Head coach: (Sweden) Pelle Gustafsson
- Website: Official website

Franchise history
- 1966–present: HC Dalen

HC Dalen, also known as Dalen Hockey, is a Swedish ice hockey club located in Jönköping, founded on 3 September 1966 out of the previous ice hockey sections of Norrahammars IK and Tabergs SK. The club will play the 2014–15 season in group South of Hockeyettan, the third tier of Swedish ice hockey. The club plays its home games in Smedjehov Norrahammar , which has a capacity of 1900 spectators.

The club played in the Swedish second division in the seasons of 1974-1975 and 1986-1987
