= IFK Tumba Fotboll =

IFK Tumba FK
- Full name: Idrottsföreningen Kamraterna Tumba Fotbollklubb
- Nickname: Folkets Lag - The People's Team
- Short name: IFK Tumba FK
- Founded: 1932; 93 years ago
- Ground: Storvretens BP; Tumba; Sweden
- Head coach: Nicolas Contreras Davis
- League: Division 4 Stockholm Södra
- 2024: 3rd
- Website: https://www.svenskalag.se/ifktumbafk
Home colours	Away colours

IFK Tumba FK is a Swedish football club located in Tumba.

== Background ==
IFK Tumba FK currently plays in Division 4 Stockholm Södra which is the sixth tier of Swedish football. They play their home matches at the Storvretens BP in Tumba.

The club is affiliated to Stockholms Fotbollförbund.

== Season to season ==
Season	Level	Division	Section	Position	Movements
1993	Tier 4	Division 3	Östra Svealand	8th	
1994	Tier 4	Division 3	Östra Svealand	8th	
1995	Tier 4	Division 3	Östra Svealand	4th	
1996	Tier 4	Division 3	Östra Svealand	10th	Relegated
1997	Tier 5	Division 4	Stockholm Södra	8th	
1998	Tier 5	Division 4	Stockholm Södra	5th	
1999	Tier 5	Division 4	Stockholm Södra	3rd	
2000	Tier 5	Division 4	Stockholm Södra	3rd	
2001	Tier 5	Division 4	Stockholm Södra	3rd	
2002	Tier 5	Division 4	Stockholm Södra	5th	
2003	Tier 5	Division 4	Stockholm Södra	10th	
2004	Tier 5	Division 4	Stockholm Södra	9th	
2005	Tier 5	Division 4	Stockholm Södra	10th	
2006*	Tier 6	Division 4	Stockholm Södra	5th	
2007	Tier 6	Division 4	Stockholm Södra	8th	
2008	Tier 6	Division 4	Stockholm Södra	5th	
2009	Tier 6	Division 4	Stockholm Södra	10th	
2010	Tier 6	Division 4	Stockholm Södra	3rd	
2011	Tier 6	Division 4	Stockholm Södra		

* League restructuring in 2006 resulted in a new division being created at Tier 3 and subsequent divisions dropping a level.
