= IFK Tumba Hockey =

- City: Tumba, Sweden
- League: Division 2
- Division: 2D
- Founded: 1937
- Home arena: Ishuset, Tumba
- Website: http://www1.idrottonline.se/IFKTumbaIK-Ishockey/

IFK Tumba Hockey is a Swedish ice hockey team currently playing in the third-tier league Division 1. Their home arena is Ishuset in Tumba, just outside Botkyrka in the Stockholm suburbs.

The club was founded in 1937 as the ice hockey section of IFK Tumba, five years after IFK Tumba was founded. The senior team was quite successful during the 1940s and the 1990s, playing in the second-tier leagues (Division 2 during the 1940s, Division 1 during the 1990s). In 1998, the senior team merged with Botkyrka IF to become Tumba/Botkyrka. Two years later, Tumba/Botkyrka was renamed Botkyrka HC.

In August 2013, IFK Tumba Hockey merged with Botkyrka HC, giving IFK Tumba a senior ice hockey team. IFK Tumba Hockey took Botkyrka HC's spot in Division 1.
