= Brunflo IK =

- City: Brunflo, Sweden
- League: Division 1
- Division: Norra
- Founded: 1975
- Home arena: Klanghallen
- Colors: Yellow, black, red
- Website: http://www7.idrottonline.se/BrunfloIK-Ishockey/

Brunflo IK is a Swedish ice hockey club based in Brunflo. It was founded in 1975, and currently plays in the Norra group of Division 1, the third tier of ice hockey in Sweden.

Internationally Brunflo is probably the best known as being the team in which the legendary Soviet and Russian forward Vladimir Krutov ended his career in 1996. More recently also his former linemate Igor Larionov (in 2006) as well as a fellow NHL veteran Scott Young (in 2012) were invited to repeat the feat, albeit rather as mere publicity stunts.
