= Grästorps IK =

- City: Grästorp, Sweden
- League: (Sweden) Division 1 as of the 2013–14 season
- Division: 1E
- Founded: 1956
- Home arena: Åse & Viste Arena
- Colors: Black, white, red
- Website: www.grastorpsik.se

Grästorps IK is a Swedish ice hockey club playing in the third tier of Swedish hockey, Division 1, as of the 2013–14 season. The club's greatest success came in the 1968–69 season when the club played in Division 2, which at the time was the second highest hockey league in Sweden.

== Season-by-season ==
Year	Level	Division	Record		Notes
Year	Level	Division	Position	W-T-L W-OT-L	Notes
2008–09	Tier 4	Division 2	2nd	19–2–6	
2009–10	Tier 4	Division 2	1st	26–7–3	
2009–10	Division 1 qualifier		2nd	5–1–1–1	▲ Promoted to Division 1
2010–11	Tier 3	Division 1E	5th	9–5–1–12	
2010–11	Tier 3	Division 1E continuation	3rd	5–0–0–5	
2011–12	Tier 3	Division 1E	9th	5–3–4–15	
2011–12	Tier 3	Division 1E continuation	5th	8–0–0–7	
2011–12	Division 1 qualifier		1st	6–1–0–1	
2011–12	Tier 3	Division 1E	9th	7–0–0–20	
2011–12	Tier 3	Division 1E continuation	6th	2–0–3–10	
2011–12	Division 1 qualifier		1st	5–0–0–3	
2013–14	Tier 3	Division 1E	TBD	TBD	
