= Kumla Hockey =

Swedish ice hockey team

Kumla Hockey Kumla HC "Black Bulls"
- City: Kumla, Sweden
- League: (Sweden) Division 1 as of the 2013–14 season
- Division: 1E
- Founded: 1963
- Home arena: Weidermans Buss Arena
- Colors: Red, black
- Website: www.kumlahockey.se

Kumla HC "Black Bulls", often referred to as Kumla Hockey, is a Kumla, Sweden-based ice hockey club. Kumla played in Sweden's second-tier league, Allsvenskan, as recently as the 2000–01 season. After being relegated in 2001, the team has played in Division 1, the third tier of ice hockey in Sweden (as of the 2013–14 season).
