= Vännäs HC =

- City: Vännäs, Sweden
- League: (Sweden) Division 1
- Division: Norra
- Founded: 1979
- Home arena: Vännäs Ishall
- Colors: Yellow, black

Vännäs HC is a Swedish ice hockey club based in Vännäs, Västerbotten County. After being promoted from Division 2 in 2012, the club plays in Division 1, the third tier of ice hockey in Sweden (as of the 2013–14 season).
