= Enköpings SK HK =

- City: Enköping, Sweden
- League: Division 1
- Division: 1C
- Home arena: Bahcohallen
- Colors: Green, white, gold
- General manager: Håkan Karlsson
- Head coach: Thom Eklund
- Website: laget.se/eskhockey

Enköpings SK Hockeyklubb, commonly known as Enköpings SK, or simply Enköping Hockey, is an ice hockey club located in the Swedish city of Enköping, and the ice hockey section of sports club Enköpings SK. The team currently plays in the 1C subgroup of Division 1, the third tier of Swedish ice hockey.
