= Helsingborgs HC =

- City: Helsingborg, Sweden
- League: Division 1
- Division: 1F
- Founded: 1977
- Home arena: Olympiarinken
- Colors: Red, white, blue
- Head coach: Peter Johansson

Helsingborgs HC is a Swedish hockey club based in Helsingborg. They currently play in group F of Division 1, the third tier of the Swedish ice hockey system.
