= SK Lejon =

- City: Skellefteå, Sweden
- League: (Sweden) Division 1
- Division: Norra
- Founded: 1958
- Home arena: Skellefteå Kraft Arena
- Colors: Red, white, black

Franchise history
- 1958–1997: Lejonströms SK
- 1997–present: SK Lejon

SK Lejon is a Swedish ice hockey club based in Skellefteå, founded in 1958 as "Lejonströms SK". The club was given its current name in 1997. As of the 2013–14 season, the club plays in Division 1, the third tier of ice hockey in Sweden. The club plays their home games at Skellefteå Kraft Arena, an arena they share with SHL-club Skellefteå AIK.
