= Kallinge-Ronneby IF =

KRIF Hockey
- City: Kallinge, Sweden
- League: Hockeyettan
- Founded: 1974
- Home arena: Soft Center Arena
- General manager: Emil Ivansson
- Head coach: Emil Ivansson
- Website: Krifhockey.se

Kallinge-Ronneby IF, commonly known as KRIF Hockey, is an ice-hockey club based in Kallinge outside Ronneby, Sweden. They compete in Hockeyettan, the third tier of ice hockey in Sweden.
