= Örnsköldsvik Hockey =

Örnsköldsvik HF
- City: Örnsköldsvik, Sweden
- League: (Sweden) Division 1
- Division: Norra
- Founded: 2010
- Home arena: Skyttishallen
- Colors: Blue, white, red

Örnsköldsvik Hockey, is a Swedish ice hockey club from Örnsköldsvik playing in the third tier of ice hockey in Sweden, Division 1, as of the 2013–14 season. The club was founded in 2010 as a merger of Örnsköldsviks SK's hockey department and KB 65.

== Season-by-season ==
Year	Level	Division	Record		Notes
Year	Level	Division	Position	W-T-L W-OT-L	Notes
2010–11	Tier 3	Division 1B	5th	10–3–3–12	
2010–11	Tier 3	Division 1B continuation	1st	8–0–0–1	
2010–11	Tier 3	Division 1 playoffs	–	0–2	Eliminated in first round
2011–12	Tier 3	Division 1B	2nd	18–2–1–7	
2011–12	Tier 3	Allettan Norra	7th	2–2–0–10	
2012–13	Tier 3	Division 1B	3rd	13–3–1–11	
2012–13	Tier 3	Allettan Norra	7th	1–1–12	
2013–14	Tier 3	Division 1 Norra	TBD	TBD	Divisions 1A and B merged into Division 1 Norra
