= IF Vallentuna BK =

Vallentuna Hockey
- City: Vallentuna, Sweden
- League: Division 1
- Division: 1D
- Home arena: Vallentuna Ishall
- Colors: Red, white
- Head coach: (Sweden) Anders Hultin
- Captain: (Sweden) Martin Lundberg
- Website: www.vallentunahockey.se

IF Vallentuna BK is a sports club based in Vallentuna, Stockholm County, Sweden. Their ice hockey department, Vallentuna Hockey, played two seasons in the second-tier HockeyAllsvenskan, from 2002–2004. The team now plays in the 1D group of third-tier Hockeyettan.
