= Ice hockey in Sweden =

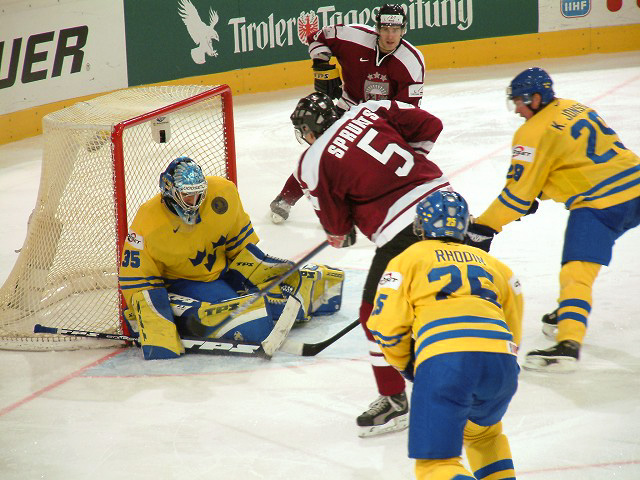
- Swedish national team in action
- Country: Sweden
- Governing body: Swedish Ice Hockey Association
- National teams: Men's national team; Women's national team
- First played: January 1921

National competitions
- Swedish Hockey League

International competitions
- IIHF World Championships; Winter Olympics; World Cup

Ice hockey in Sweden has a history going back to at least 1912 and is one of the country's most popular sports. The sport was first organized in the country by the Swedish Football Association (SvFF), which was a member of the IIHF in 1912. The ice hockey department of the SvFF eventually split off to become the Swedish Ice Hockey Association (SIHA) which today is still responsible for organizing Sweden's domestic leagues and its participation in tournaments internationally. The highest tier of men's ice hockey in Sweden, the SHL, brought in 1,974,388 spectators in the 2013–14 season, the highest overall attendance in Swedish sports. The SHL's average of 5,983 spectators per match is bested only by Allsvenskan, the country's top flight of association football.

The first recorded official ice hockey game on Swedish soil was played at Stockholm Stadium on 30 January 1921 when IFK Uppsala defeated Berliner SC, 4–1.

== National teams ==
=== Men's ===
Often referred to by the nickname "Tre Kronor" (English: Three Crowns), the Swedish men's national ice hockey team is amongst the most successful in the world, being considered part of the Big Six. The team is, as of 2018, ranked first in the IIHF World Ranking.

Sweden has won nine olympic medals, including gold medals in 1994 and 2006. They have also won the IIHF World Championships 11 times, most recently in 2018 in Denmark.

=== Women's ===
Sweden's women's national team, nicknamed Damkronorna (English: The Lady Crowns) as a play on the nickname of the men's team, played their first official match in 1989, though they had been playing on an unofficial basis since 1987. In the five Olympics that have featured women's ice hockey, the team has finished with a medal twice, bronze in 2002 and silver in 2010. They finished fourth in the 2014 Olympics.

As of the 2018 April IIHF World Ranking, Damkronorna were ranked sixth in the world.

== Men's leagues ==
Tier	Leagues/Divisions			
1	SHL; 14 teams			
2	HockeyAllsvenskan; 14 teams			
3	Hockeyettan; 40 teams total, divided into 4 groups geographically.			
3	Hockeyettan North; 10 teams	Hockeyettan East; 10 teams	Hockeyettan West; 10 teams	Hockeyettan South; 10 teams
4+	All divisions after Hockeyettan are organized regionally			

=== SHL ===
The SHL (Swedish Hockey League or Svenska hockeyligan), founded in 1975 as Elitserien, is the highest level of men's ice hockey in Sweden, the second-most attended (in average attendance) sports league in Sweden (after Allsvenskan), the third-most attended ice hockey league in Europe, and as of 2006 is the fourth-highest paid hockey league in the world.

==== Attendances ====
The SHL club with the highest average home league attendance per league season:

#	Club	Average
2018-19	Frölunda HC	10,071
2017-18	Frölunda HC	9,667
2016-17	Frölunda HC	9,029
2015-16	Frölunda HC	9,312
2014-15	Frölunda HC	9,087

=== HockeyAllsvenskan ===
HockeyAllsvenskan is the second tier of men's ice hockey, and has by far the highest average attendance of second-tier ice hockey leagues in Europe.

=== Hockeyettan ===
In Hockeyettan, teams do not compete nationally, but rather break into four divisions/groups organized geographically. These smaller divisions play half a season together, after which the more successful teams in the four divisions join two new groups, organized geographically into "Allettan North" and "Allettan South", and play the rest of the season in the new groups. Meanwhile, the teams in the four beginning groups that did not qualify for Allettan continue playing in the original groups, with the poorest performing teams being forced to defend their spots against the winning teams from Division 2 in the qualification tournament known as Kvalserien. The two Allettan winners battle for a direct spot in the Kvalserien for HockeyAllsvenskan in a series known as Hockeyettanfinalen. The teams ranked 2–9 in each Allettan group, the loser of Hockeyettanfinalen and the winners of the continuation groups qualify for a three-round playoff where the final three remaining teams qualify for the same Kvalserien. These four teams are joined by the two worst HockeyAllsvenskan teams to battle for two spots in the following HockeyAllsvenskan season.

=== Tiers 4–7 ===
All leagues in Swedish ice hockey after Hockeyettan are organized regionally. There is Hockeytvåan, the fourth tier. Most regions also have Hockeytrean. The eastern region also has Hockeyfyran. Stockholm also has a seventh division, Division 5, and has also briefly had an eighth, Division 6.

=== Timeline ===
Tier 1 Tier 2 Tier 3 Tier 4 Tier 5 Tier 6

== Women's leagues ==
The highest women's ice hockey league is Swedish Women's Hockey League, which has eight teams. Lower leagues are Damettan and Damtvåan.
