= Fabian (name) =

- Gender: Male
- Name day: January 20

Other names
- Related names: Fabien; Fabio; Fabiano

Fabian is the English form of the late Roman name Fabianus. This was a name originally given to those adopted into or descended through the female line from a Roman family named Fabius, that derived from the Latin faba for the broad bean, an important food crop in antiquity. It entered the English language with the Normans, but has never achieved the popularity of Fabien in France, Fabio or Fabiano in Italy, Portugal and Brazil, and Fabián in Spain.

Fabian, or its variants, may also be a surname.

== Given name ==
- Fabian (died 250), Pope, saint, martyr
- Fabian (born 1943), American singer, actor
- Fabian Aichner (born 1990), Italian professional wrestler, known by his ring name Giovanni Vinci
- Fabian Ajogwu (born 1970), Nigerian politician
- Fabián Alfaro (born 1981), Chilean footballer
- Fabian Allen (born 1995), Jamaican cricketer
- Fabian Almazan (born 1984), Cuban-born American pianist, composer
- Fabian Alomar, American pro skateboarder and actor
- Fabian Andre (1910–1960), American composer
- Fabián Anguamea (born 1993), Mexican baseball player
- Fabian Arndt (born 1995), German footballer
- Fabián Assmann (born 1986), Argentine footballer
- Fabian Bachrach (1917–2010), American photographer
- Fabian Bäcker (born 1990), German footballer
- Fabián Balbuena (born 1991), Paraguayan footballer
- Fabian Barański (born 1999), Polish rower
- Fabian Barbiero (born 1984), Australian footballer
- Fabián Basabe (born 1978), American politician
- Fabián Bastidas (born 1993), American-Colombian footballer
- Fabián Basualdo (born 1964), Argentine footballer
- Fabian Baumgärtel (born 1989), German footballer
- Fabian Gottlieb von Bellingshausen (1778–1852), Baltic German-Russian naval officer, cartographer, explorer
- Fabián Benítez (born 1981), Chilean footballer
- Fabian Benko (born 1998), Croatian-German footballer
- Fabian Beqja (born 1994), Albanian footballer
- Fabián Bielinsky (1959–2006), Argentine film director
- Fabian Biörck (1893–1977), Swedish gymnast
- Fabian Birkowski (1566–1636), Polish writer, preacher
- Fabian Blattman (born 1958), Australian Paralympic track and field athlete
- Fabián Blengino, former Argentine tennis coach
- Fabian Böhm (born 1989), German handball player
- Fabian Bohn (born 1982), Dutch DJ, producer, stage name Brennan Heart
- Fabián Bonhoff (born 1963), Argentine footballer
- Fabian Booysen (born 1992), South African rugby union player
- Fabián Borda (born 1966), Argentine politician
- Fabián Bordagaray (born 1987), Argentine footballer
- Fabian Bösch (born 1997), Swiss freestyle skier
- Fabian Bourzat (born 1980), French ice dancer
- Fabian Bredlow (born 1995), German footballer
- Fabian Broghammer (born 1990), German footballer
- Fabian Brunnström (born 1985), Swedish ice hockey player
- Fabian Bruskewitz (born 1935), American Roman Catholic Church prelate
- Fabian Burdenski (born 1991), German footballer
- Fabian Busch (born 1975), German actor
- Fabián E. Bustamante, American computer scientist
- Fabián Bustos (born 1969), Argentine footballer and manager
- Fabian Bzdyl (born 2007), Polish professional footballer
- Fabián Caballero (born 1978), Argentine footballer
- Fabian Cadiz (1961–2022), Filipino politician
- Fabián Cancelarich (1965–2024), Argentine footballer
- Fabian Cancellara (born 1981), Swiss professional road cyclist
- Fabián Canobbio (born 1980), Uruguayan footballer
- Fabián Carini (born 1979), Uruguayan footballer
- Fabián Carmona (born 1994), Chilean footballer
- Fabián Carrizo (born 1966), Argentinian footballer
- Fabián Castillo (born 1992), Colombian footballer
- Fabian Cavadias (born 2001), German footballer
- Fabián Cerda (born 1989), Chilean footballer
- Fabián Cháirez (born 1987), Mexican artist
- Fabian Chavez Jr. (1924–2013), American politician
- Fabián Coelho (born 1977), Uruguayan footballer
- Fabián Coito (born 1967), Uruguayan footballer and manager
- Fabián Coronel (born 1987), Argentine footballer
- Fabian Coulthard (born 1982), English-New Zealand race car driver
- Fabian Cowdrey (born 1993), English cricketer
- Fabián Cubero (born 1978), Argentine footballer
- Fabián Cuellar (born 1985), Colombian footballer
- Fabián Cuero (born 1994), Colombian footballer
- Fabian Davis (born 1974), Jamaican footballer
- Fabian Dawkins (born 1981), Jamaican footballer
- Fabian Debora (born 1975), Chicano artist
- Fabián Delgado (born 1966), Uruguayan musical artist
- Fabian Delph (born 1989), English Footballer
- Fabian Delryd (born 1996), Swedish high jumper
- Fabian Deluca (born 1987), Australian rules footballer
- Fabián Dobles (1918–1997), Costa Rican politician and writer
- Fabian Doñate, American politician
- Fabian Dörfler (born 1983), German slalom canoeist
- Fabian Döttling (born 1980), German chess Grandmaster
- Fabian Drzyzga (born 1990), Polish volleyball player
- Fabian Edwards (born 1993), English Mixed Martial Artist
- Fabian Eberle (born 1992), Liechtensteiner footballer
- Fabian Ehmann (born 1998), Austrian footballer
- Fabian Eisele (born 1995), German footballer
- Fabian Ernst (born 1979), German footballer
- Fabián Espíndola (born 1985), Argentine footballer
- Fabián Estay (born 1968), Chilean footballer
- Fabián Estoyanoff (born 1982), Uruguayan footballer
- Fabian Fahl (born 1993), German politician
- Fabian Fallert (born 1997), German tennis player
- Fabian Fernando (born 1995), Sri Lankan cricketer
- Fabián Ferrari (born 1964), Argentine swimmer
- Fabian von Fersen (1626–1677), Swedish general, freelord, field marshal, governor-general
- Fabian von Fersen (1762–1818), Swedish count, politician, officer, courtier
- Fabian Figueiredo (born 1968), Portuguese sociologist and politician
- Fabian Florant (born 1983), Dominican-Dutch triple jumper
- Fabian Forde (born 1981), English footballer
- Fabian Forte (born 1943), American singer, actor
- Fabian Fournier, Canadian-American lumberjack
- Fabian Francis (born 1973), Australian rugby league footballer, Australian rules football player
- Fabian Franke (born 1989), German footballer
- Fabian Franklin (1853–1939), Hungarian-American engineer, mathematician, journalist
- Fabian Frei (born 1989), Swiss footballer
- Fabian de Freitas (born 1972), Surinamese footballer
- Fabian Freyenhagen (born 1978), British philosopher
- Fabián Frías (born 1971), Argentine football manager
- Fabian Friedrich (born 1980), German swimmer
- Fabian Fuchs (born 1961), Swiss cyclist
- Fabian Funke (born 1997), German politician
- Fabian Gaffke (1913–1992), American baseball player
- Fabián García (1871–1948), Mexican-American horticulturist
- Fabián Garfagnoli (born 1970), Argentine footballer
- Fabian Garin (1895–1990), Russian Soviet writer
- Fabian Geiser (born 1983), Swiss footballer
- Fabian Gerber (born 1979), German footballer
- Fabian Gerster (born 1986), German footballer
- Fabian Giefer (born 1990), German footballer
- Fabian Giger (born 1987), German footballer
- Fabián el Gitano (1972–2011), Mexican professional wrestler
- Fabian Gloor (born 2002), Cuban footballer
- Fabian Gmeiner (born 1997), Austrian footballer
- Fabian Goodall (born 1994), Australian-Fijian footballer
- Fabian Götze (born 1990), German footballer
- Fabian Gramling (born 1987), German politician
- Fabian Graudenz (born 1992), German footballer
- Fabian Greilinger (born 2000), German footballer
- Fabian Griewel (born 1997), German politician
- Fabian Grimberg (born 1964), Argentine footballer
- Fabian Guerra (born 1995), American football player
- Fabián Guevara (born 1968), Chilean footballer
- Fabian Hambüchen (born 1987), German gymnast
- Fabian Hamilton (born 1955), British politician
- Fabian Heidegger (born 1988), Italian windsurfer
- Fabian Heimpel (born 1990), German international rugby union player
- Fabian Heinle (born 1994), German long jumper
- Fabian Heldner (born 1996), Swiss ice hockey player
- Fabián Henríquez (born 1995), Argentinian association football player
- Fabian Herbers (born 1993), German footballer
- Fabian Hergesell (born 1985), German footballer
- Fabian Hertner (born 1985), Swiss orienteering competitor
- Fabian Hevia, Australian jazz percussionist
- Fabian Himcinschi (born 1994), Romanian footballer
- Fabian Hinrichs (born 1974), German actor
- Fabian Hoffman (1917–1980), American football player
- Fabian Holland, multiple people
- Fabian Holthaus (born 1995), German footballer
- Fabian Holzer (born 1992), German badminton player
- Fabián Hormazábal (born 1996), Chilean footballer
- Fabián Huaiquimán (born 1998), Chilean karateka
- Fabian Ihekweme (born 1969), Nigerian politician
- Fabian Jackson (1902–1978), Trinidad and Tobago Anglican Bishop
- Fabian Jacobi (born 1973), German politician
- Fabian Jara (born 1993), Paraguayan javelin thrower
- Fabian Jeker (born 1968), Swiss road bicycle racer
- Fabian Johnson (born 1987), American soccer player
- Fabian Joseph (born 1965), Canadian ice hockey player
- Fabian Juries (born 1979), South African rugby union player
- Fabian Kahl (born 1991), German art and antique dealer; author
- Fabian Kalig (born 1993), German footballer
- Fabian Kasi (born 1967), Ugandan accountant, bank executive, businessman
- Fabian Kastner (born 1977), Swedish writer, literary critic
- Fabian Kauter (born 1985), Swiss épée fencer
- Fabian de Keijzer (born 2000), Dutch footballer
- Fabian Keller (born 1982), Swiss ice dancer
- Fabian Kelly, German tenor
- Fabian Kiessling (born 1972), German radiologist, university lecturer, author
- Fabian Kizito (born 1990), Ugandan footballer
- Fabian Kling (born 1987), German footballer
- Fabian Klos (born 1987), German footballer
- Fabian Koch (born 1989), Austrian footballer
- Fabian Kowalik (1908–1954), American baseball player
- Fabian Kunze (born 1998), German footballer
- Fabian Lagman (born 1962), Argentine footballer
- Fabian Lamotte (born 1983), German footballer
- Fabián Lannutti (born 1964), Argentine judoka
- Fabian Leendertz (born 1972), German biologist
- Fabian Leimlehner (born 1987), Austrian artistic gymnast
- Fabian Lenssen, Dutch music producer, songwriter and remixer
- Fabian Lenz, German DJ, techno musician and events producer
- Fabian Liebig (born 1994), German modern pentathlete
- Fabian Lienhard (born 1993), Swiss cyclist
- Fabian Lokaj (born 1996), Albanian footballer
- Fabián de Luna (born 1996), Mexican artistic gymnast
- Fabian Lustenberger (born 1988), Swiss footballer
- Fabian Lysell (born 2003), Swedish ice hockey player
- Fabián Maidana (born 1992), Argentine boxer
- Fabian Majcherski (born 1997), Polish volleyball player
- Fabian Malleier (born 1998), Italian luger
- Fabian Manning (born 1964), Canadian politician
- Fabian Månsson (1872–1938), Swedish socialist
- Fábián Marozsán (born 1999), Hungarian tennis player
- Fabian McCarthy, several individuals
- Fabian Menig (born 1994), German footballer
- Fabian Merién (born 2008), Dutch footballer
- Fabian Messina (born 2002), Dominican Republic footballer
- Fabian Michaels, South African Paralympic athlete
- Fabian Miesenböck (born 1993), Austrian footballer
- Fabian Molina (born 1990), Swiss politician
- Fabian Monge (born 2001), Australian footballer
- Fabián Monserrat (born 1992), Argentine footballer
- Fabian Montabell (born 1985), German footballer
- Fabián Montes Sánchez (born 1974), Mexican politician
- Fabián Monzón (born 1987), Argentine footballer
- Fabian Moreau (born 1994), American football player
- Fabián Moyano (born 1986), Argentine footballer
- Fabian Mrozek (born 2003), Polish footballer
- Fabian Msimang (born 1960), South African Air Force officer
- Fabian Müller (born 1964), Swiss composer
- Fabian Müller (born 1986), German footballer
- Fabián Muñoz, multiple people
- Fabian Muyaba (born 1970), Zimbabwean sprinter
- Fabian Nelson (born 1985), American politician
- Fabian Nicieza (born 1961), Argentine-American comic book writer
- Fabián Noguera (born 1993), Argentine footballer
- Fabian Norberg (born 1995), Swedish ice hockey player
- Fabian Norsten (born 2000), Swedish handball player
- Fabián Nsue, Equatoguinean lawyer
- Fabian Núñez (born 1966), American politician
- Fabián Núñez (footballer) (born 1992), Chilean footballer
- Fabian Nürnberger (born 1999), German footballer
- Fabian O'Dea (1918–2004), Canadian lawyer, politician
- Fabián O'Neill, (1973–2022), Uruguayan footballer
- Fabian Obmann (born 1996), Austrian snowboarder
- Fabian Oefner, Swiss artist
- Fabian van Olphen (born 1981), Dutch handball player
- Fabián Orellana (born 1986), Chilean footballer
- Fabian Gottlieb von der Osten-Sacken (1752–1837), Baltic German-Russian field marshal
- Fabian Osuji (1942–2024), Nigerian politician, educator
- Fabián Panisello (born 1963), Argentine composer, conductor and educator
- Fabian Pascal, Romanian-American consultant
- Fabian Pavone (born 2000), Italian footballer
- Fabian Pawela (born 1985), Polish footballer
- Fabián Paz (born 1953), Ecuadorian footballer
- Fabián Pedacchio (born 1964), Argentine Catholic priest
- Fabián Peña (born 1973), Mexican footballer
- Fabian Perez (born 1967), Argentine artist
- Fabian Piasecki (born 1995), Polish footballer
- Fabian Picardo (born 1972), Gibraltarian politician, barrister
- Fabian Plak (born 1997), Dutch volleyball player
- Fabián Ponce (born 1971), Argentine footballer and manager
- Fabian Posch (born 1988), Austrian handball player
- Fabián Puerta (born 1991), Colombian cyclist
- Fabián Pumar (born 1976), Uruguayan footballer
- Fabián Ramos (born 1994), Chilean footballer
- Fabian Recher (born 1999), Swiss para-cyclist
- Fabian Reese (born 1997), German footballer
- Fabian Reid (born 1991), Jamaican footballer
- Fabian Ribauw (born 1971), Nauruan politician
- Fabian Rieder (born 2002), Swiss footballer
- Fabian Rießle (born 1990), German Nordic combined skier
- Fabián Rinaudo (born 1987), Argentine footballer
- Fabián Ríos, multiple people
- Fabián Robles (born 1974), Mexican actor
- Fabian Rohner (born 1998), Swiss footballer
- Fabian Rollins (born 1976), Barbadian sprinter
- Fabian Romo (born 1997), American wheelchair basketball player
- Fabián Roncero (born 1970), Spanish long-distance runner
- Fabián de la Rosa (1869–1937), Filipino painter
- Fabian Roth (born 1995), German badminton player
- Fabian Rüdlin (born 1997), German footballer
- Fabián Ruiz (born 1996), Spanish footballer
- Fabian Russell (born 1968), Australian conductor, music educator
- Fabián Saavedra (born 1992), Chilean footballer
- Fabián Sambueza (born 1988), Argentine footballer
- Fabián Sánchez, multiple people
- Fabián Santana (born 1985), Argentine footballer
- Fabian Schaar (born 1989), German track and road racing cyclist
- Fabian Schär (born 1991), Swiss footballer
- Fabian Schiller (born 1997), German racing driver
- Fabian von Schlabrendorff (1907–1980), German jurist; soldier; member, German resistance, World War II
- Fabian Schleusener (born 1991), German footballer
- Fabian Schmitt (born 1992), German Greco-Roman wrestler
- Fabian Schmutzler (born 2005), German darts player
- Fabian Schnabel (born 1993), German footballer
- Fabian Schnaidt (born 1990), German road bicycle racer
- Fabian Schnellhardt (born 1994), German footballer
- Fabian Schönheim (born 1987), German footballer
- Fabian Schrödter (born 1982), German water polo player
- Fabian Schubert (born 1994), Austrian footballer
- Fabian Schulze (1984–2024), German pole vaulter
- Fabian Schwingenschlögl (born 1991), German swimmer
- Fabian Sejanes (born 1969), Argentine equestrian
- Fabian Senninger (born 1996), German-Nigerian footballer
- Fabian Serrarens (born 1991), Dutch footballer
- Fabián Slančík (born 1991), Slovak footballer
- Fabian Soutar (born 1986), Cook Islands international rugby league footballer
- Fabian Spiess (born 1994), German footballer
- Fabian Sporkslede (born 1993), Dutch footballer
- Fabian Stanach, Polish chess player
- Fabian Stang (born 1955), Norwegian lawyer, politician
- Fabian Steinheil (1762–1831), Baltic German-Russian military officer, governor-general
- Fabian Stenzel (born 1986), German footballer
- Fabian Stoller (born 1988), Swiss footballer
- Fabian Stumm (born 1981), German actor
- Fabián Taborda (born 1978), Colombian football manager
- Fabian Tait (born 1993), Italian footballer
- Fabian Tamm (1879–1955), Swedish naval officer
- Fabian Tassano (born 1963), British economist
- Fabian Taylor (born 1980), Jamaican footballer
- Fabian Teușan (born 1988), Romanian footballer
- Fabian Thylmann (born 1978), German businessman
- Fabian Tillanen (1895–1976), Finnish politician
- Fabián Torres (born 1989), Chilean footballer
- Fabian Trettenbach (born 1991), German footballer
- Fabián Trujillo (born 1986), Uruguayan footballer
- Fabián Turnes (born 1965), Argentine rugby player
- Fabian Udekwu (1928–2006), Nigerian cardiac surgeon
- Fabian Varesi, Italian composer, keyboardist
- Fabián Vargas (born 1980), Colombian footballer
- Fabián Vázquez (born 1943), Mexican equestrian
- Fabian Velardes (born 1984), Argentinian boxer
- Fabián Velasco (1902–1953), Spanish athletics competitor
- Fabian Ver (1920–1998), Filipino military officer
- Fabian Vettel (born 1998), German racing driver
- Fabian Vogel (born 1995), German trampoline gymnast
- Fabian Volpi (born 1997), Brazilian footballer
- Fabian Wagner (born 1978), German cinematographer
- Fabian Ware (1869–1949), British Army general, founder of the Commonwealth War Graves Commission
- Fabian Washington (born 1983), American Football player
- Fabian Wegmann (born 1980), German road racing cyclist
- Fabian Weinhandl (born 1987), Austrian ice hockey player
- Fabian Weiß (born 1992), German footballer
- Fabian Wetter (born 1989), German footballer
- Fabian White Jr. (born 1998), American basketball player
- Fabian Whymns (born 1961), Bahamian sprinter
- Fabian Wiede (born 1994), German handball player
- Fabian Wilkens Solheim (born 1996), Norwegian alpine ski racer
- Fabian Wilnis (born 1970), Dutch footballer
- Fabian Windhager (born 2001), Austrian footballer
- Fabian S. Woodley (1888–1957), English newspaperman, poet
- Fabian Wrede (1641–1712), Swedish politician
- Fabián Yantorno (born 1982), Uruguayan footballer
- Fabian Zetterlund (born 1999), Swedish ice hockey player

== Surname ==
- Andrew Fabian (born 1948), British astronomer, astrophysicist
- Ava Fabian (born 1962), American model, actress
- Christopher Fabian (born 1980), Polish-American technologist
- Dušan Fabian (born 1975), Slovak writer
- Eva Fabian (born 1993), American-Israeli world champion swimmer
- Genah Fabian (born 1989), New Zealand mixed martial artist
- Jacob Fabian (1865–1941), American theater owner, later Vice President of First National Pictures
- Johannes Fabian (1937–2026), German anthropologist
- John M. Fabian (1939–2026), American NASA astronaut and United States Air Force officer
- Jud Fabian (born 2000), American baseball player
- Lara Fabian (born 1970), Canadian-Belgian singer
- Miri Fabian (born 1943), Israeli actress
- Olga Fabian (1885-1983), Austrian-born American actress
- Patrick Fabian (born 1964), American actor
- Stephen Fabian (1930–2025), American illustrator

== Fictional characters ==
- Fabian Cortez, a mutant character in Marvel Comics
- Fabian Marechal-Julbin (Bevatron), a mutant character in Marvel Comics
- Fabian Petrulio, in The Sopranos episode College

== See also ==
- Quintus Fabius Maximus Verrucosus (c.280 BC – 203 BC), Roman politician, general, eponym of Fabian strategy
