= Geiser =

Geiser may refer to:

- Carl Friedrich Geiser (1843–1934), Swiss mathematician
- David Geiser (1947–2020), American artist
- Fabian Geiser (born 1983), Swiss footballer (i.e. soccer player)
- Geiser Manufacturing, late 19th-century and early 20th-century American manufacturing company of farm equipment
- Jeff Geiser (born 1953), American football coach
- Justin Geiser, American politician
- Linda Geiser (born 1935), Swiss movie and television actress

== See also ==
- Gaiser
- Geyser
