= Sibidiena gens =

Ancient Roman plebeian family

The gens Sibidiena, sometimes written Sabidiena, was an obscure plebeian family at ancient Rome. No members of this gens attained any of the higher offices of the Roman state, but several are known from inscriptions.

== Origin ==
The nomen Sibidienus belongs to a class of names ending in -enus, typically derived from other gentilicia, or sometimes from cognomina. Sibidienus would seem to be derived from Sabidius, or perhaps from its derivative, Sabidianus. Gentilicia of this type were common in Umbria and Picenum, and most of the Sibidieni known from inscriptions seem to have lived at or near Tuficum in Umbria, from which it appears that the Sibidieni may have been of Umbrian origin, although the surname Sabinus borne by some of the family suggest that they may have been Sabines.

== Praenomina ==
The main praenomina of the Sibidieni were Lucius and Gaius, the two most common names throughout all periods of Roman history. It also appears that the Sibidieni at one time used Spurius, a praenomen that had been common in Republican times, but which had become increasingly scarce, and finally disappeared under the early Empire.

== Branches and cognomina ==
The only distinct family of the Sibidieni lived at Tuficum in Umbria, but they do not appear to have been divided into separate branches. Sabinus, the only surname known to have been passed down among the Sibidieni, belongs to a class of cognomina typically indicating the place of origin of an individual or family, and suggests that the Sabidieni either were, or claimed descent from the Sabines. Maximus, borne by one or two of the family, was typically given to an eldest son, or bestowed on someone who had earned great honor or distinction. Scaeva, borne by an ancestor of the Sabini, originally designated someone left-handed, but could also refer to someone particularly lucky, or unlucky.

== Members ==
This list includes abbreviated praenomina. For an explanation of this practice, see filiation.

- Sabidienus Paulus, a rhetorician early in imperial times, whose ineptitude is noted by Seneca the Elder. Sabidienus' description of Cicero's defense of Popillius made it sound as though it were Popillius guiding Cicero out of peril.
- Lucius Sibidienus, named in an inscription from Tuficum in Umbria, along with Gaius Sibidienus Maximus.
- Spurius Sabidienus (Falisleius?), the master of Artemo, a slave named in an inscription from Minturnae in Latium.
- Sibidienus Maximus, a centurion in the fifteenth legion.
- Gaius Sibidienus C. f. Maximus, a military tribune in the second cohort of the praetorian guard.
- Lucius Sibidienus L. f. Scaeva, the father of Lucius Sibidienus Sabinus, the military tribune, named in an inscription from Tuficum.
- Lucius Sibidienus L. f. L. n. Sabinus, was at various times a military tribune, curator of the roads and bridges of Umbria and Picenum, and procurator of Africa. He was patron of the municipium of Attidium in Umbria. He married Autia Vera. His inscriptions seem to place him between AD 50 and 70.
- Lucius Sibidienus Sabinus, a tribune in the fifth cohort of the vigiles at Rome, at the beginning of the third century.

== See also ==
- List of Roman gentes

== Bibliography ==
- Lucius Annaeus Seneca (Seneca the Elder), Controversiae.
- Theodor Mommsen et alii, Corpus Inscriptionum Latinarum (The Body of Latin Inscriptions, abbreviated CIL), Berlin-Brandenburgische Akademie der Wissenschaften (1853–present).
- George Davis Chase, "The Origin of Roman Praenomina", in Harvard Studies in Classical Philology, vol. VIII, pp. 103–184 (1897).
- John C. Traupman, The New College Latin & English Dictionary, Bantam Books, New York (1995).
