= Fabiani =

Fabiani is a surname. Notable people with the surname include:

- Alessia Fabiani (born 1976), Italian model and television personality
- Fabio Fabiani (born 1974), Italian racing driver
- Francesco de Fabiani (born 1993), Italian cross country skier
- Giuseppe Fabiani (1926–2019), Italian Catholic bishop
- Joel Fabiani (born 1936), American actor
- Harish Fabiani, Indian businessman
- Jean-Louis Fabiani (born 1951), French sociologist and social anthropologist
- Linda Fabiani (born 1956), Scottish politician
- Mark D. Fabiani (born 1957), American political strategist and crisis management expert
- Max Fabiani (1865–1962), Italian architect
- Oliviero Fabiani (born 1990), Italian rugby player
- Raúl Fabiani (born 1984), Equatoguinean footballer
- Roland Fabiani (born 1971), Scottish footballer

== See also ==
- Fabbiani
- Fabian (disambiguation)
