= Doldán =

Doldán is a surname. Notable people with the surname include:

- José Doldán (born 1997), Paraguayan footballer
- Luis Doldán (1938–2015), Paraguayan footballer
- Roberto Fabian Sanchez Doldán (born 1988), Paraguayan footballer
