= Fabbiano =

Fabbiano is an Italian surname. Notable people with the surname include:

- Pepi Fabbiano, American astrophysicist
- Thomas Fabbiano (born 1989), Italian tennis player

== See also ==
- Fabbiani
