= Gaiser =

Gaiser (or Gaisser) is a surname. Notable people with the surname include:

- Fred Gaiser (1885–1918), American baseball player
- Fritz Gaiser (1907–1994), German cross-country skier
- George Gaiser (born 1945), American football player
- Jens Gaiser (born 1978), German Nordic combined skier
- Julia Haig Gaisser (born 1941), American classical scholar and professor of Latin
- Marco Gaiser (born 1993), German footballer
- Megan Gaiser, American business executive
- Otto Gaiser (1919–1944), German fighter pilot
- Serge Gaisser (born 1958), French footballer
- T. Elliot Gaiser (born 1989), American attorney
- Thomas K. Gaisser (1940–1922), American astroparticle physicist

== See also ==
- Geiser
