= Fabien =

French given masculine name

Fabien is both a French given masculine name and a French surname. Notable people with the name include:

People with the given name Fabien:

- Fabien Audard (born 1978), French professional football (soccer) player
- Fabien Barthez (born 1971), retired French football goalkeeper
- Fabien Boudarène (born 1978), French footballer
- Fabien Bravi (born 1984), French politician
- Fabien Camus (born 1985), French football player
- Fabien Chéreau (born 1980), French computer programmer
- Fabien Cool (born 1972), former French football goalkeeper
- Fabien Cordeau (1923-2007), politician in Quebec, Canada
- Fabien Cousteau (born 1967), French aquatic filmmaker
- Fabien Delrue (born 2000), French badminton player
- Fabien Foret (born 1973), professional motorcycle racer
- Fabien Frankel (born 1994), British actor
- Fabien Galthié (born 1969), French rugby union coach and former player
- Fabien Gilot (born 1984), French Olympic and world champion swimmer
- Fabien Giroix (born 1960), French racing driver
- Fabien Laurenti (born 1983), French professional football (soccer) defender
- Fabien Leclercq (born 1972), French football player
- Fabien Lévy (born 1968), French composer
- Fabien Lovett (born 1999), American football player
- Fabien Patanchon (born 1983), French professional road bicycle racer
- Fabien Pelous (born 1973), French rugby union footballer
- Fabien Roy (1928–2023), politician in Quebec, Canada
- Fabien Roussel (born 1969), French politician
- Fabien Sevitzky (1893–1967), American conductor
- Fabien Vienne (18 February 1925 - 31 March 2016) French architect
- Fabien Vorbe (born 1990), Haitian football (soccer) forward
- Fabien (born 1987), French model and actor

People with the surname Fabien:

- Cédric Fabien (born 1982), professional footballer
- Errol Fabien (21st century), television and radio presenter
- John Fabien (died 2012), Dominican politician
- Louis Fabien (1924–2016), French painter
- Marie-Denise Fabien-Jean-Louis (born 1944), Haitian physician and politician
- Raymond Fabien (born 1945), retired sprinter

== See also ==
- Fabian (disambiguation)
- Fabienne
