= Fabián Muñoz =

Fabián Muñoz may refer to:

- Fabián Muñoz (Chilean footballer) (born 1978), Chilean footballer
- Fabián Muñoz (Argentine footballer) (born 1991), Argentine football forward
