= Rudolf Wagner (pilot) =

WWII Luftwaffe fighter ace

- Born: 29 October 1921; Essingen (Württemberg), Germany
- Died: 11 December 1943 (aged 22); Missing in action over Zhytomyr Oblast, Ukraine
- Military career
- Allegiance: Nazi Germany
- Branch: Luftwaffe
- Service years: 1941–1943
- Rank: Leutnant (second lieutenant)
- Unit: JG 51
- Commands: 12./JG 51
- Conflicts: World War II: Eastern Front
- Awards: Knight's Cross of the Iron Cross

Rudolf Wagner (29 October 1921 – 11 December 1943) was a former Luftwaffe fighter ace and recipient of the Knight's Cross of the Iron Cross during World War II. Rudolf Wagner was credited with 81 aerial victories all over the Eastern Front (World War II). He was missing in action over Zhytomyr Oblast, Ukraine, in 1943 during WWII.

== Career ==
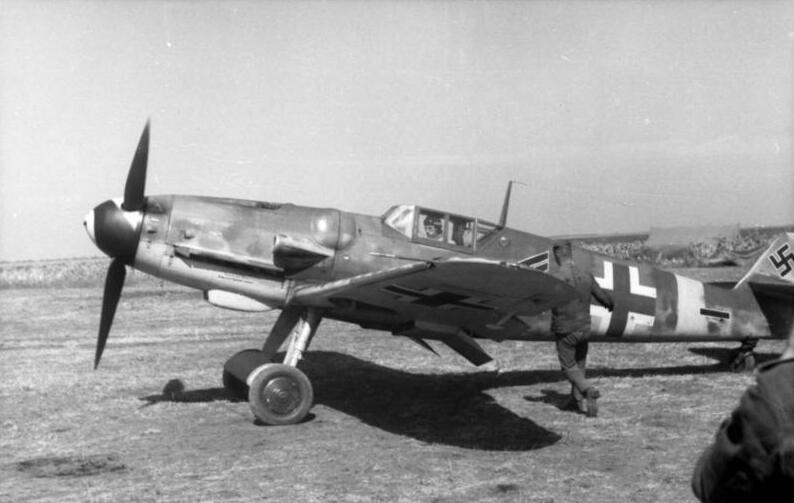
Wagner scored many of his victories while piloting his Messerschmitt Bf 109 (Note: It is not known how many different aircraft Wagner flew while accumulating his 81 kills, his unit was known for flying the Bf 109. The Luftwaffe also used the Focke-Wulf Fw 190 aircraft over the eastern front by 1943.)

Wagner entered the military on May 11, 1941, as an Oberfeldwebel. When he completed his training he was assigned to o IV./JG 51 - Jagdgeschwader 51. In early 1942 and he served as Otto Gaiser's wingman. Wagner scored 81 aerial victories most of then while he was piloting a Messerschmitt Bf 109; he also may have recorded kills while flying a Focke-Wulf Fw 190 in 1943.

=== Squadron leader and missing in action ===
In October 1943, when Hauptmann Wilhelm Moritz was transferred, Wagner succeeded him as Staffelführer (squadron leader) of 12. Staffel of JG 51.

On 11 December, Wagner was posted as missing in action following aerial combat in his Messerschmitt Bf 109 G-6 (Werknummer 140232—factory number) 3 kilometers (1.9 miles) north of Weprin, present-day Vepryk. He was succeeded by Oberleutnant Hugo Brönner as commander of 12. Staffel of JG 51. Posthously on 26 March 1944, Wagner was awarded the Knight's Cross of the Iron Cross (Ritterkreuz des Eisernen Kreuzes) for his 81 aerial victories claimed.

== Summary of career ==
=== Aerial victory claims ===
According to US historian David T. Zabecki, Wagner was credited with 81 aerial victories. Spick also lists him with 81 aerial victories claimed in an unknown number of combat missions. Mathews and Foreman, authors of Luftwaffe Aces — Biographies and Victory Claims, researched the German Federal Archives and found records for 79 aerial victory claims, all of which claimed on the Eastern Front.

Victory claims were logged to a map-reference (PQ = Planquadrat), for example "PQ 47594". The Luftwaffe grid map (Jägermeldenetz) covered all of Europe, western Russia and North Africa and was composed of rectangles measuring 15 minutes of latitude by 30 minutes of longitude, an area of about 360 square miles (930 km^{2}). These sectors were then subdivided into 36 smaller units to give a location area 3 km × 4 km (1.9 mi × 2.5 mi) in size.

Chronicle of aerial victories
This and the ♠ (Ace of spades) indicates those aerial victories which made Wagner an "ace-in-a-day", a term which designates a fighter pilot who has shot down five or more airplanes in a single day. This and the ? (question mark) indicates information discrepancies listed by Prien, Stemmer, Rodeike, Bock, Mathews and Foreman.
| Claim | Date | Time | Type | Location | Claim | Date | Time | Type | Location |
| 1 | 10 August 1942 | 15:45 | LaGG-3 | PQ 47594 vicinity of Rzhev | 2 | 16 December 1942 | 08:20 | Il-2 | 30 km (19 mi) northwest of Velikiye Luki |
– 10. Staffel of Jagdgeschwader 51 "Mölders" – Eastern Front — 4 February – October 1943
| 3 | 9 February 1943 | 10:12 | Pe-2 | PQ 35 Ost 26713; 20 km (12 mi) northwest of Moschna | 40 | 26 August 1943 | 13:40 | La-5 | southeast of Komyschij |
| 4 | 16 March 1943 | 15:35 | LaGG-3 | PQ 35 Ost 35 Ost 36732 | 41 | 30 August 1943 | 16:26 | Pe-2 | southwest of Taranivka |
| 5 | 16 March 1943 | 15:55 | MiG-3 | PQ 35 Ost 16882; 20 km (12 mi) southeast of Demydiv | 42 | 1 September 1943 | 07:50 | Yak-1 | west of Yelnya |
| 6 | 3 April 1943 | 14:15 | Boston | 5 km (3.1 mi) west of Nowaiki | 43 | 5 September 1943 | 06:41 | Yak-9 | southeast of Yartsevo |
| 7 | 13 April 1943 | 14:13 | Yak-1 | PQ 35 Ost 45574; 15 km (9.3 mi) south of Spas-Demensk | 44 | 5 September 1943 | 06:43 | Yak-9 | southeast of Yartsevo |
| 8 | 23 April 1943 | 13:52 | Yak-1 | PQ 35 Ost 63372; 25 km (16 mi) southwest of Glazunowka | 45 | 6 September 1943 | 09:50 | Yak-9 | south of Medvedevo |
| 9 | 24 April 1943 | 04:45 | La-5 | PQ 35 Ost 54554; 20 km (12 mi) north-northwest of Bryansk | 46 | 14 September 1943 | 12:55 | La-5 | Nowo Kriwoshoje |
| 10 | 24 April 1943 | 04:49 | LaGG-3 | PQ 35 Ost 44654; 30 km (19 mi) northeast of Bryansk | 47 | 19 September 1943 | 14:10 | Yak-9 | west of Ssurjakowo |
| 11 | 8 June 1943 | 05:58 | LaGG-3 | PQ 35 Ost 63461; 5 km (3.1 mi) east of Kromy | 48 | 19 September 1943 | 15:10 | Il-2 m.H. (Note: The "m.H." refers to an Ilyushin Il-2 with rear gunner (mit Heckschütze).) | west of Lubjanki |
| 12 | 10 June 1943 | 19:09 | Pe-2 | PQ 35 Ost 34274; 20 km (12 mi) east-northeast of Seschtschinskaja | 49 | 20 September 1943 | 13:20 | Il-2 m.H. | northwest of Perwoswanowka |
| 13 | 10 June 1943 | 19:19 | Pe-2 | PQ 35 Ost 35861; 20 km (12 mi) west of Kirov | 50 | 21 September 1943 | 06:35 | Yak-9 | west of Sagassnaja |
| 14 | 5 July 1943 | 09:36 | LaGG-3 | PQ 35 Ost 63553; 15 km (9.3 mi) west of Maloarkhangelsk | 51 | 24 September 1943 | 13:31 | Pe-2 | north of Kremenchuk |
| 15 | 5 July 1943 | 09:50 | La-5 | PQ 35 Ost 63642; 5 km (3.1 mi) southeast of Maloarkhangelsk | 52 | 24 September 1943 | 13:39 | Pe-2 | east of Koselschtschina |
| 16 | 5 July 1943 | 18:37 | Il-2 | PQ 35 Ost 63531 vicinity of Maloarkhangelsk | 53♠ | 26 September 1943 | 06:10 | Yak-1 | south of Fukaschewo |
| 17 | 5 July 1943 | 18:50 | P-39 | PQ 35 Ost 63544; 10 km (6.2 mi) south-southeast of Trosna | 54♠ | 26 September 1943 | 08:25 | Yak-1 | east of Jelenowka |
| 18♠ | 6 July 1943 | 07:40 | LaGG-3 | PQ 35 Ost 63571; 20 km (12 mi) south-southeast of Trosna | 55♠ | 26 September 1943 | 13:27 | Yak-1 | north of Orljansk |
| 19♠ | 6 July 1943 | 08:14 | La-5 | PQ 35 Ost 63583; 20 km (12 mi) southwest of Maloarkhangelsk | 56♠ | 26 September 1943 | 16:35 | Yak-1 | Burtschak |
| 20♠ | 6 July 1943 | 08:15 | La-5 | PQ 35 Ost 63544; 10 km (6.2 mi) south-southeast of Trosna | 57♠ | 26 September 1943 | 16:50 | Yak-1 | north of Ssadowy |
| 21♠ | 6 July 1943 | 08:16 | La-5 | PQ 35 Ost 63573; 20 km (12 mi) south-southeast of Trosna | 58♠ | 27 September 1943 | 10:25 | Yak-1 | north of Domotkan |
| 22♠ | 6 July 1943 | 08:22 | La-5 | PQ 35 Ost 63543; 10 km (6.2 mi) south-southeast of Trosna | 59♠ | 27 September 1943 | 10:31 | Il-2 m.H. | northeast of Lichovka |
| 23 | 7 July 1943 | 04:25 | Yak-1 | PQ 35 Ost 63611; 5 km (3.1 mi) northeast of Maloarkhangelsk | 60♠ | 27 September 1943 | 13:30 | La-5 | northwest of Borodajevka |
| 24 | 9 July 1943 | 12:10 | La-5 | PQ 35 Ost 63561; 10 km (6.2 mi) southwest of Maloarkhangelsk | 61♠ | 27 September 1943 | 13:40 | Pe-2 | north of Mischurin-Rog |
| 25 | 12 July 1943 | 05:17 | Il-2 | PQ 35 Ost 63252; 15 km (9.3 mi) southeast of Zalegoshch | 62♠ | 27 September 1943 | 15:20 | La-5 | west of Mischurin-Rog |
| 26 | 13 July 1943 | 13:37 | Yak-1 | PQ 35 Ost 63252; 15 km (9.3 mi) southeast of Zalegoshch | 63♠ | 27 September 1943 | 15:34 | Pe-2 | northwest of Grigoryewk |
| 27 | 13 July 1943 | 13:41 | Il-2 m.H. | PQ 35 Ost 63253; 15 km (9.3 mi) southeast of Zalegoshch | 64 | 29 September 1943 | 14:08 | P-39 | northeast of Tiefenbrunn |
| 28 | 15 July 1943 | 17:03 | Yak-1 | PQ 35 Ost 63222; 10 km (6.2 mi) east of Zalegoshch | 65 | 29 September 1943 | 14:10 | P-39 | east of Ukrainka |
| 29 | 17 July 1943 | 05:00 | Yak-1 | south of Anachina | 66 | 29 September 1943 | 16:45 | Yak-1 | west of Wischnewskij |
| 30 | 17 July 1943 | 05:02 | Yak-1 | west of Massalskaya | 67 | 30 September 1943 | 16:00 | Yak-1 | southwest of Schulgowka |
| 31 | 11 August 1943 | 07:20 | La-5 | south of Izium | 68 | 1 October 1943 | 10:37 | Yak-1 | east of Domotkan |
| 32 | 12 August 1943 | 13:30 | La-5 | southeast of Bogodukhov | 69 | 2 October 1943 | 15:05 | La-5 | west of Domotkan |
| 33 | 13 August 1943 | 14:05 | La-5 | southwest of Bogodukhov | 70 | 2 October 1943 | 17:05? (Note: According to Mathews and Foreman claimed at 17:02.) | La-5 | southeast of Yakymivka |
| 34 | 18 August 1943 | 05:55 | P-39 | west of Ssemenowka | 71 | 3 October 1943 | 11:03 | Yak-1 | south of Borodayevka |
| 35 | 18 August 1943 | 15:45 | Yak-1 | east-northeast of Kuibyschevo | 72 | 3 October 1943 | 13:45 | Yak-1 | south of Borodayevka |
| 36 | 18 August 1943 | 17:50 | Il-2 m.H. | southeast of Ssemenowskij | 73 | 5 October 1943 | 12:30 | Yak-9 | east of Domotkan |
| 37 | 19 August 1943 | 06:10 | La-5 | west of Novosselovka | 74 | 5 October 1943 | 12:39 | Yak-9 | east of Proletarka |
| 38 | 21 August 1943 | 16:28 | Il-2 m.H. | east-northeast of Gubarovka | 75 | 6 October 1943 | 06:47 | La-5 | south of Borodayevka |
| 39 | 22 August 1943 | 18:08 | Yak-1 | east of Kasarowka | 76 | 6 October 1943 | 12:42 | La-5 | west of Karpenki |
– 12. Staffel of Jagdgeschwader 51 "Mölders" – Eastern Front — November – 11 December 1943
| 77 | 30 November 1943 | 11:05 | Yak-9 | PQ 25 Ost 91538; 10 km (6.2 mi) southeast of Radomyshl | 79 | 13 December 1943 | 14:10 | La-5 | PQ 25 Ost 91336; 15 km (9.3 mi) southeast of Malyn |
| 78 | 12 December 1943 | 09:15 | La-5 | PQ 25 Ost 91328; 10 km (6.2 mi) south of Malyn | | | | | |

=== Awards ===
- Iron Cross (1939) 2nd and 1st Class
- Honor Goblet of the Luftwaffe on 20 September 1943 as Feldwebel and pilot
- German Cross in Gold on 17 October 1943 as Feldwebel in the 10./Jagdgeschwader 51. (Note: According to Obermaier, posthumously on 10 January 1944.)
- Knight's Cross of the Iron Cross on 26 March 1944 as Leutnant and pilot in the 12./Jagdgeschwader 51 "Mölders" (Note: According to Scherzer as pilot in the 10./Jagdgeschwader 51 "Mölders".)
