= Fabián Sánchez =

Fabián Sánchez may refer to:

- Fabian Sanchez (dancer) (born 1988), Colombian dancer
- Fabián Sánchez (footballer, born 1988), Paraguayan football striker
- Fabián Sánchez (footballer, born 2001), Argentine football left-back

== See also ==
- Fabien Sanchez (born 1983), French track cyclist
