= Clara Gómez Caro =

Mexican politician (born 1949)

- Born: 12 August 1949 (age 76); Jalisco, Mexico
- Occupation: Politician
- Political party: PRI

Clara Gómez Caro (born 12 August 1949) is a Mexican politician from the Institutional Revolutionary Party (PRI). In the 2009 mid-terms she was elected to the Chamber of Deputies to represent Jalisco's 9th district during the 61st session of Congress.
