= Fabian =

Fabian may refer to:

== People ==
- Fabian (name), including a list of people with the given name or surname
- Fabian Maximus (3rd century BC), Roman consul during Second Punic War and namesake of the Fabian strategy
- Pope Fabian (died 250), Catholic saint
- Fabian Forte (born 1943), 1950s American teen idol, singer and actor, known by the mononym Fabian
- Fabian Monge (born 2001), Australian footballer
- Fabian (footballer), Brazilian footballer Fabian Maria Lago Vilela de Abreu (born 1997)
- Fabulous Fabian (born 1970), former ring name of professional wrestler Marcus Alexander Bagwell

== Arts and entertainment ==
- Fabian: The Story of a Moralist, a novel by German author Erich Kästner
- Fabian (film), a 1980 adaptation of Kästner's novel
- Fabian – Going to the Dogs, a 2021 film adaptation of Kästner's novel

=== Characters ===
- Fabian Cortez, a Marvel Comics villain, enemy of the X-Men
- Fabian Prewett in the Harry Potter universe, maternal uncle to Ron Weasley
- Fabian Rutter, from the Nickelodeon television show House of Anubis
- Robert Fabian, protagonist of Fabian of the Yard, a British 1950s television series

== Other uses ==
- Fabian (grape), another name for the wine grape Chasselas
- Fabian Society, a socialist society in the UK
- Tropical Storm Fabian, a typhoon, various storms, and a cyclone
- Fabian strategy, a military strategy
- Fabiani, a surname
