= Fabbiani =

Fabbiani is an Italian surname. Notable people with the surname include:

- Cristian Fabbiani (born 1983), Argentine football player and manager
- Juan Vicente Fabbiani (1910–1989), Venezuelan painter
- Mariana Fabbiani (born 1975), Argentine TV hostess and model
- Óscar Fabbiani (born 1950), Argentine-Chilean footballer

== See also ==
- Fabiani
