= Fabian Russell =

Australian conductor

- Born: 1968 (age 56–57); Sydney, Australia
- Occupation(s): Conductor and Educator!
- Instrument: Tuba

Fabian Russell is an Australian conductor and music educator.

In 2002 he founded The Orchestra Project, where he is the artistic director. From 2011 to 2015 he was Principal Conductor and artistic director of the Monash Academy Orchestra at the Monash Academy of Performing Arts. Other conducting roles include appointments as an Associate Conductor of the Australian Youth Orchestra; Principal Guest Conductor of the New South Wales Youth Orchestra (2016–2019); and Principal Conductor and artistic director of Melbourne Youth Orchestras (2007–2011).

== Early life and training ==
Born in Sydney, Australia in 1968, Russell's early musical training was as a euphonium and tuba player. At the age of 19, he was appointed guest principal tuba of the Sydney Symphony Orchestra where he remained for three years. He was then offered the principal tuba position with Orchestra Victoria and in 1993 he was appointed to the Melbourne Symphony Orchestra where he remained for fourteen years, retiring at the end of its 2006 season. During this time Russell also appeared as a soloist, including as a finalist in the 1997 Symphony Australia Young Performer Awards performing the Tuba Concerto by John Williams.

Russell holds a master's degree in music from Griffith University, Queensland and in 2012 he was also awarded a Sir Winston Churchill Fellowship to undertake a study of international youth orchestra programs.

== Conducting career ==
In 2002 Russell founded The Orchestra Project – a Melbourne-based training orchestra composed of leading young musicians from across Australia who are given the opportunity to perform large-scale symphonic works while being mentored by members of Australia's professional orchestras. In 2013, Russell made his Victorian Opera debut conducting a new production of John Adams’ Nixon in China. Critically praised, these performances resulted in a Green Room Award for Best Conductor of an Opera.

Russell has also been a guest conductor with the following orchestras:

Melbourne Symphony Orchestra	Malaysian Philharmonic Orchestra
Queensland Symphony Orchestra	Sydney Symphony Orchestra
Tasmanian Symphony Orchestra	Orchestra Victoria
Adelaide Symphony Orchestra	Auckland Philharmonic Orchestra
Melbourne Chamber Orchestra	Darwin Symphony Orchestra
Australian Youth Orchestra	Geelong Symphony Orchestra
Niedersächsisches Jugensinfonieorchester	Sydney Youth Orchestra
ANAM Orchestra	University of Melbourne Symphony Orchestra

== Awards ==
- 1999. Elton John Melbourne Symphony Orchestra Scholarship
- 2012. Sir Winston Churchill Fellowship
- 2014. Green Room Award for 'Best Music Direction, Opera'
