= María Leticia Mendoza Curiel =

Mexican politician (born 1956)

- Born: 10 December 1956 (age 69); Jalisco, Mexico
- Occupation: Politician
- Political party: PRI

María Leticia Mendoza Curiel (born 10 December 1956) is a Mexican politician affiliated with the Institutional Revolutionary Party (PRI). In the 2012 general election she was elected to the Chamber of Deputies to represent Jalisco's 9th district during the 62nd session of Congress.
