= Rocío Corona Nakamura =

Mexican politician (born 1964)

- Born: 3 February 1964 (age 62); Guadalajara, Jalisco, Mexico
- Occupation: Politician
- Political party: PRI, PVEM

María del Rocío Corona Nakamura (born 3 February 1964) is a Mexican politician. She has been affiliated with both the Institutional Revolutionary Party (PRI) and the Ecologist Green Party of Mexico (PVEM).

She served as a member of the Congress of Jalisco on five occasions between 1982 and 2012.

In the 2012 general election, she was elected on the PRI ticket to the Chamber of Deputies as a plurinominal deputy for the 62nd Congress, representing the first region, which includes her home state of Jalisco. She returned to the lower house of Congress in the 2021 mid-terms, representing Jalisco's 9th district for the PVEM.

Corona Nakamura won election as one of Jalisco's senators in the 2024 Senate election, occupying the second place on the Sigamos Haciendo Historia coalition's two-name formula. In the Senate, she sits as a member of the PVEM.
