= 9th federal electoral district of Jalisco =

Federal electoral district of Mexico

Jalisco's 9th
- Electoral district of the Chamber of Deputies of Mexico

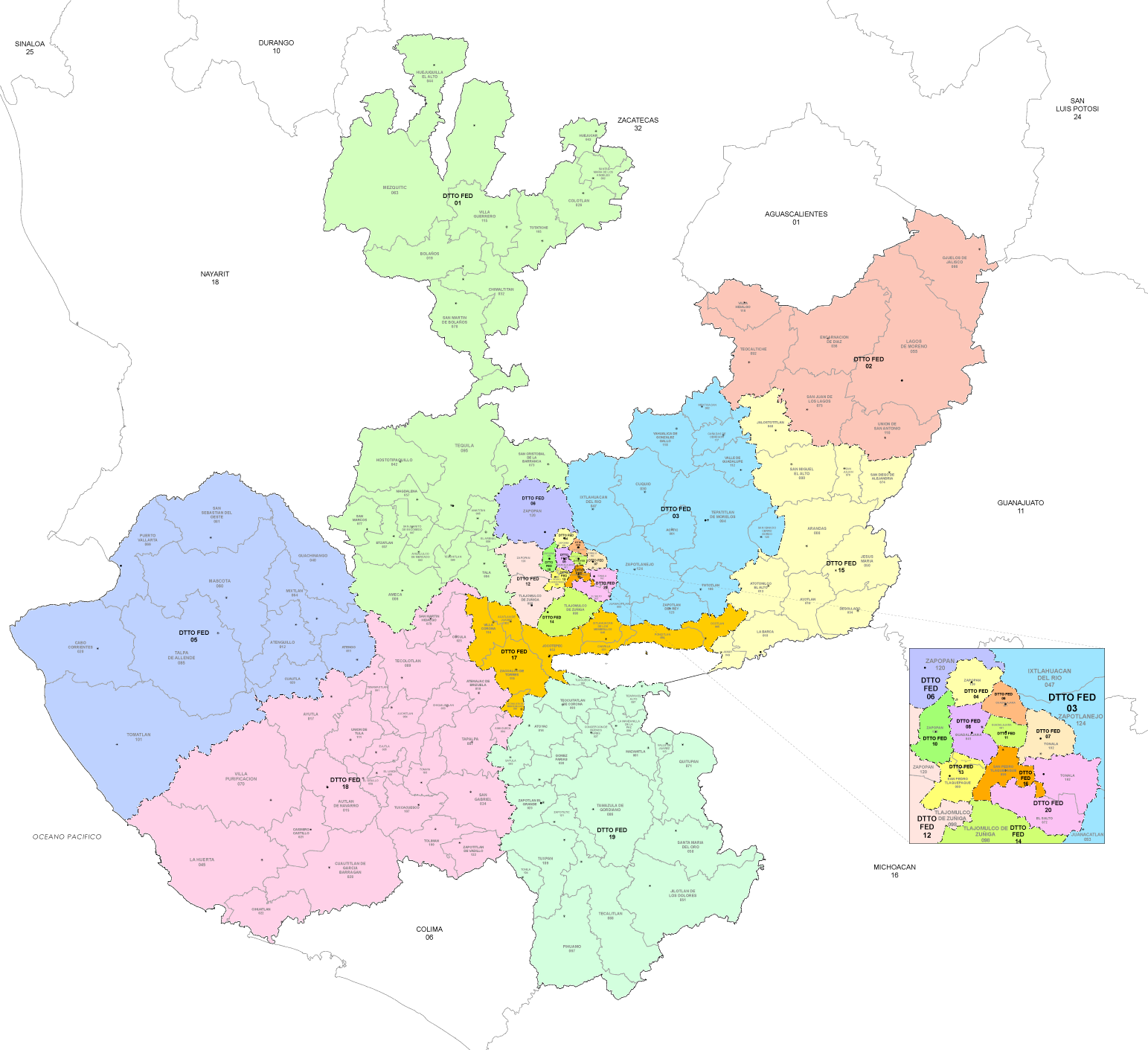
- 9th district

Incumbent
- Member: Favio Castellanos Polanco
- Party: ▌Morena
- Congress: 66th (2024–2027)

District
- State: Jalisco
- Head town: Guadalajara
- Coordinates: 20°40′N 103°21′W
- Covers: Municipality of Guadalajara (part)
- PR region: First
- Precincts: 230
- Population: 407,166 (2020 census)

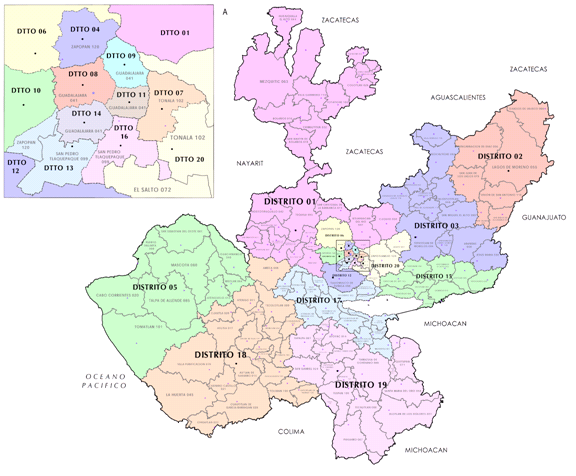
Jalisco's districts in 2017–2022

The 9th federal electoral district of Jalisco (Spanish: Distrito electoral federal 09 de Jalisco) is one of the 300 electoral districts into which Mexico is divided for elections to the federal Chamber of Deputies and one of 20 such districts in the state of Jalisco.

It elects one deputy to the lower house of Congress for each three-year legislative session by means of the first-past-the-post system. Votes cast in the district also count towards the calculation of proportional representation ("plurinominal") deputies elected from the first region.

The current member for the district, elected in the 2024 general election, is Favio Castellanos Polanco of the National Regeneration Movement (Morena).

== District territory ==
Under the 2023 districting plan adopted by the National Electoral Institute (INE), which is to be used for the 2024, 2027 and 2030 federal elections, Jalisco's 9th district covers 230 electoral precincts (secciones electorales) in the north-eastern portion of the municipality of Guadalajara. (Note: The 8th, 11th and 13th districts cover the remainder of the municipality.)

The head town (cabecera distrital), where results from individual polling stations are gathered together and tallied, is the state capital, the city of Guadalajara. The district reported a population of 407,166 in the 2020 census.

== Previous districting schemes ==
Evolution of electoral district numbers
| | 1974 | 1978 | 1996 | 2005 | 2017 | 2023 |
|---|---|---|---|---|---|---|
| Jalisco | 13 | 20 | 19 | 19 | 20 | 20 |
| Chamber of Deputies | 196 | 300 | | | | |

2017–2022

Jalisco regained its 20th congressional seat in the 2017 redistricting process. The 9th district's head town was at Guadalajara and it covered 193 precincts in the north-east of the municipality.

2005–2017

Under the 2005 plan, Jalisco had 19 districts. This district's head town was at Guadalajara and it covered 159 precincts in the north-east of the municipality.

1996–2005

In the 1996 scheme, under which Jalisco lost a single-member seat, the district had its head town at Guadalajara and it comprised 140 precincts in the north-east of the municipality.

1978–1996

The districting scheme in force from 1978 to 1996 was the result of the 1977 electoral reforms, which increased the number of single-member seats in the Chamber of Deputies from 196 to 300. Under that plan, Jalisco's seat allocation rose from 13 to 20. The 9th district's head town was at Jocotepec and it covered 13 municipalities:
- Acatlán de Juárez, Amacueca, Atoyac, Chapala, Ixtlahuacán de los Membrillos, Juanacatlán, Techaluta, Teocuitatlán de Corona, Tlajomulco de Zúñiga, Tuxcueca, Villa Corona, Zacoalco de Torres and Jocotepec.

== Deputies returned to Congress ==
(Mexico) National parties
- Current
- PAN
- PRI
- PT
- PVEM
- MC
- Morena
- PAZ
- Somos
- Defunct or local only
- PLM
- PNR
- PRM
- PNM
- PP
- PPS
- PARM
- PFCRN
- CON
- PANAL
- PSD
- PES
- PES
- PRD

Jalisco's 9th district
| Election | Deputy | Party | Term | Legislature |
|---|---|---|---|---|
| 1916 | Juan de Dios Robledo | | 1916–1917 | Constituent Congress of Querétaro |
...
| 1976 | María Guadalupe Urzúa Flores | Institutional Revolutionary Party | 1976–1979 | 50th Congress |
| 1979 | José María Sotelo Anaya | Institutional Revolutionary Party | 1979–1982 | 51st Congress |
| 1982 | Bertha Lenia Hernández de Ruvalcaba | Institutional Revolutionary Party | 1982–1985 | 52nd Congress |
| 1985 | Rafael González Pimienta | Institutional Revolutionary Party | 1985–1988 | 53rd Congress |
| 1988 | Francisco Galindo Musa | Institutional Revolutionary Party | 1988–1991 | 54th Congress |
| 1991 | Enrique Chavero Ocampo | Institutional Revolutionary Party | 1991–1994 | 55th Congress |
| 1994 | Mario Alejandro Rosales Anaya | Institutional Revolutionary Party | 1994–1997 | 56th Congress |
| 1997 | José Ángel Frausto Ortiz | National Action Party (Mexico) | 1997–2000 | 57th Congress |
| 2000 | Tomás Coronado Olmos | National Action Party (Mexico) | 2000–2003 | 58th Congress |
| 2003 | Quintín Vázquez García (Note: Originally elected for the PRI, Vázquez García sat as an independent after March 2006.) | Institutional Revolutionary Party Independent politician | 2003–2006 | 59th Congress |
| 2006 | Fabián Fernando Montes Sánchez | National Action Party (Mexico) | 2006–2009 | 60th Congress |
| 2009 | Clara Gómez Caro | National Action Party (Mexico) | 2009–2012 | 61st Congress |
| 2012 | María Leticia Mendoza Curiel | Institutional Revolutionary Party | 2012–2015 | 62nd Congress |
| 2015 | María Candelaria Ochoa Ávalos | Citizens' Movement (Mexico) | 2015–2018 | 63rd Congress |
| 2018 | Carmen Julia Prudencio González | Citizens' Movement (Mexico) | 2018–2021 | 64th Congress |
| 2021 | María del Rocío Corona Nakamura | Ecologist Green Party of Mexico | 2021–2024 | 65th Congress |
| 2024 | Favio Castellanos Polanco | National Regeneration Movement | 2024–2027 | 66th Congress |

== Presidential elections ==
Jalisco's 9th district
| Election | District won by | Party or coalition | % |
|---|---|---|---|
| 2018 | Andrés Manuel López Obrador | Juntos Haremos Historia | 47.6894 |
| 2024 | Claudia Sheinbaum Pardo | Sigamos Haciendo Historia | 48.1830 |
