= Quintín Vázquez García =

Mexican politician (born 1955)

- Born: 23 July 1955 (age 70); Guadalajara, Jalisco, Mexico
- Occupation: Politician
- Political party: PRI (1987–2006)

Quintín Vázquez García (born 23 July 1955) is a Mexican politician formerly affiliated with the Institutional Revolutionary Party (PRI).

In the 2003 mid-terms he was elected to the Chamber of Deputies on the PRI ticket to represent Jalisco's 9th district during the 59th session of Congress. He resigned his PRI membership in March 2006 and sat as an independent thereafter.
