= Tomás Coronado Olmos =

Mexican politician (born 1960)

- Born: 9 December 1960 (age 65); Jalisco, Mexico
- Occupation: Politician
- Political party: PAN

Tomás Coronado Olmos (born 9 December 1960) is a Mexican politician from the National Action Party (PAN). In the 2000 general election he was elected to the Chamber of Deputies to represent Jalisco's 9th district during the 58th session of Congress.
