= Ron Fowler (politician) =

American politician from Missouri

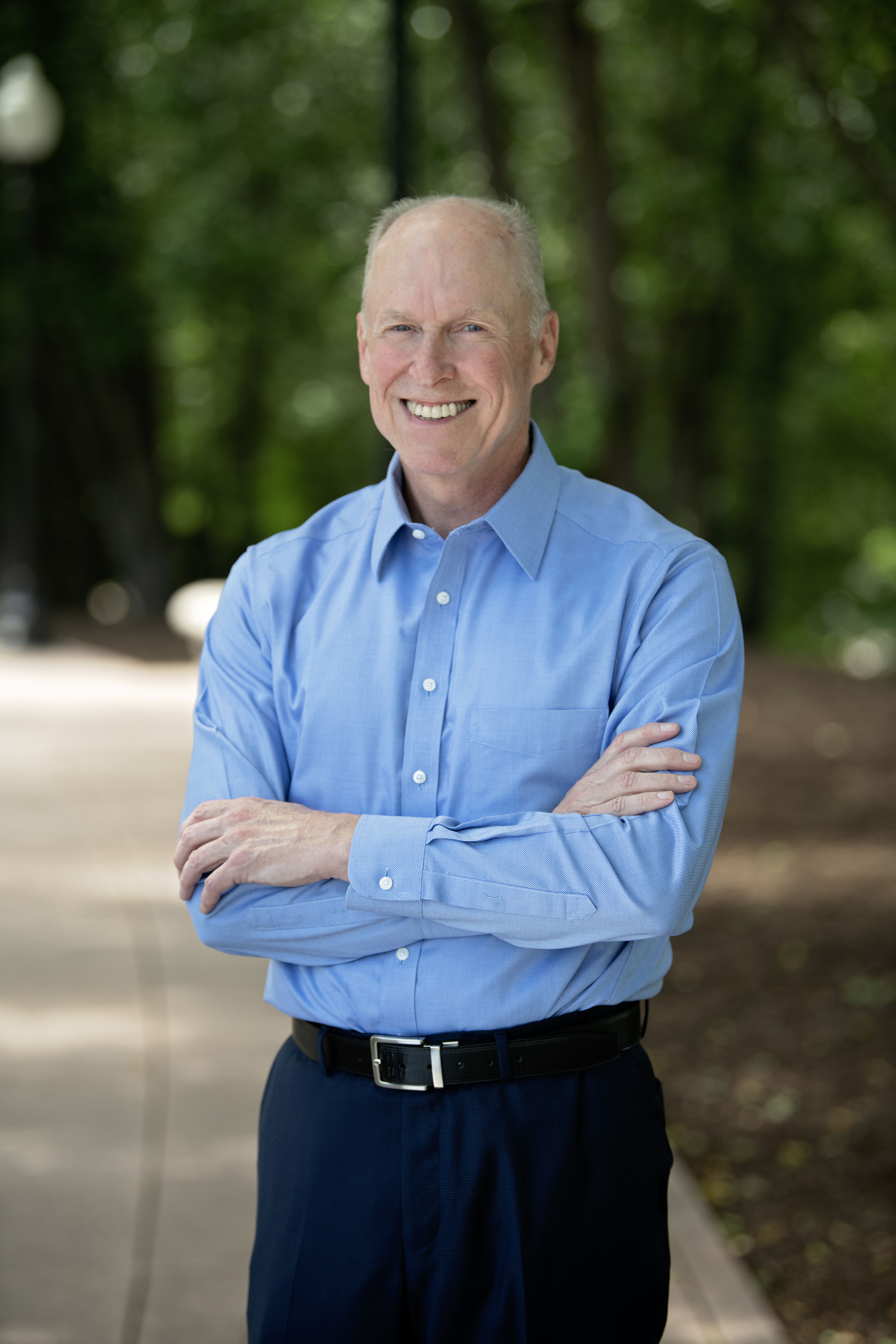

Member of the Missouri House of Representatives from the 31st district
- Incumbent
- Assumed office January 8, 2025
- Preceded by: Dan Stacy
- Succeeded by: Justin Geiser (elect)

Personal details
- Party: Republican

Ron Fowler is an American politician serving as a Republican member of the Missouri House of Representatives from the 31st District since 2025. The district covers parts of Blue Springs in Jackson County. Before his election to the House, Fowler served on the Blue Springs City Council for more than thirty years, including as mayor pro tem.

== Early life and career ==
Fowler earned dual bachelor's degrees from the University of Missouri–Kansas City. He worked for more than 40 years at the Lake City Army Ammunition Plant in Independence, Missouri.

Fowler served on the Blue Springs City Council for over 32 years, including as the council's liaison to the city's Public Safety Advisory Board. He was elected to the Missouri House in November 2024, succeeding Dan Stacy, and took office on January 8, 2025.

== Blue Springs City Council ==
Fowler moved to Blue Springs in 1986 and was elected to the city's Board of Aldermen in 1992, continuing to serve after the body was reorganized as the Blue Springs City Council. He became its longest-serving member, and the city recognized his twenty-five years of service in April 2017 and his thirty years in April 2022.

Fowler served as mayor pro tem and as the council's liaison to the Citizens Public Safety Advisory Board. He also sat on the city's Planning Commission, Parks Board, Citizens Public Safety Board, and Solid Waste Committee, and voted to establish the charter commission that drafted the Blue Springs City Charter.

He introduced Bill No. 2451, which authorized the city to purchase land and build the first two phases of Adams Dairy Parkway, the corridor that later became the site of the Adams Dairy Landing shopping center. He was among the council members who approved the creation of the Blue Springs Police Department's youth outreach unit, later renamed the Community and Youth Outreach Unit. Fowler remained on the council while campaigning for the Missouri House in 2024.

== Committees Assignments (2025-26) ==
- Rules - Legislative
- Special Committee on Intergovernmental Affairs
- Special Committee on Property Tax Reform
- Special Interim Committee on Property Tax Reform
- Utilities

== Electoral history ==
2024 Missouri House of Representatives election, 31st District
Party	Candidate	Votes	%
Republican	Ron Fowler	10,665	55.65
Democratic	Jeremy Rowan	8,501	44.35
Total votes		19,166	100.00
Republican hold			
