= Fabienne =

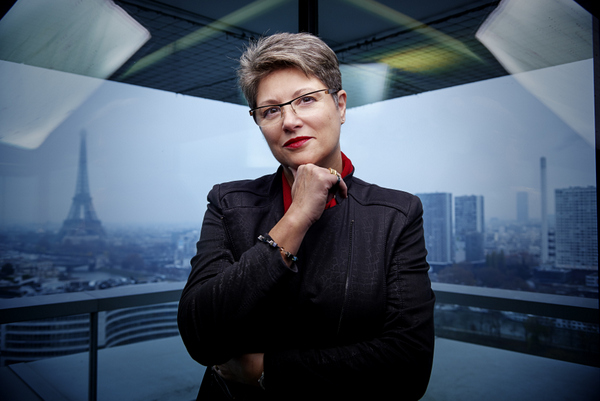
Fabienne Goux-Baudiment in 2017

Fabienne is a feminine French and English given name. Notable people with the name include:

- Fabienne André (born 1996), British athlete
- Fabienne Bangerter, Swiss association football player
- Fabienne Brugère (born in 1964), French philosopher, academic
- Fabienne Dufour (born 1981), Belgian swimmer
- Fabienne Feraez (born 1976), Beninese sprinter
- Fabienne Goux-Baudiment, French futurist
- Fabienne Guillaume, French Tibetan Buddhist nun and prison chaplain
- Fabienne Humm (born 1986), Swiss footballer
- Fabienne Keller (born 1959), French politician
- Fabienne Kabou (born 1977), French convicted murderer
- Fabienne Reuteler (born 1979), Swiss snowboarder
- Fabienne Serrat (born 1956), French ski alpine racer and world champion
- Fabienne Shine (21st century), French model, musician and actor
- Fabienne Stämpfli (born 1992), Swiss politician
- Fabienne Suter (born 1985), Swiss Alpine skier
- Fabienne Thibeault (born 1952), Canadian singer

The name is derived from the female version of "Fabianus" and "Fabien" and means "the noble".

in other languages the name may be as follows:

- Fabiana (Latin)
- Fabiana (Italian)
- Fabiana (Portuguese and Spanish)
