= Fabian Kiessling =

German radiologist and academic (born 1972)

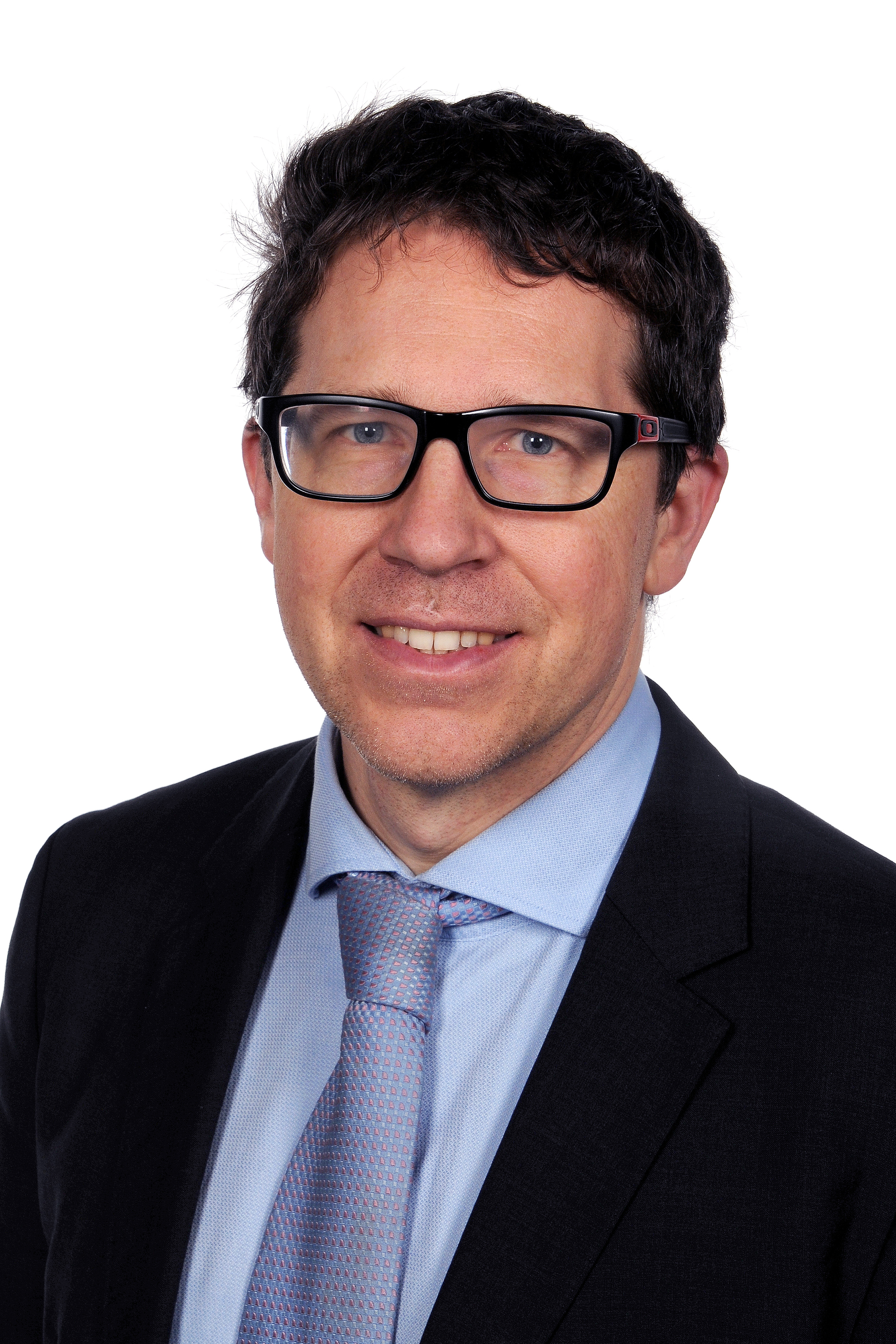

Fabian Kiessling (born 16 August 1972) is a German radiologist, university lecturer, and author as well as a scientist in the field of molecular imaging.

== Academic career ==
Fabian Kiessling was born Mannheim and graduated high school in 1992 in Heidelberg and studied medicine at Heidelberg University. After his elective period at the district hospital in Schwetzingen, he completed his studies with the second state examination and was awarded his doctorate in 2001 in Internal Medicine.

From 2001 he worked in the Dept. of Oncological Diagnostics and Therapy at the German Cancer Research Center (DKFZ) in Heidelberg and stayed there as an intern until 2002.

In 2003 he moved to the Dept. of Oncology at the Thorax Clinic Heidelberg and in parallel became head of the Molecular Diagnostics group in the Dept. of Medical Physics in Radiology at the DKFZ. In 2006, he became the Junior Group Leader for 'Molecular Imaging' at the DKFZ and habilitated in Experimental Radiology at the Heidelberg University.

2007 he completed his education as a medical specialist in diagnostic radiology.

In March 2008 he was appointed as full professor and director of the Institute for Experimental Molecular Imaging (ExMI) at RWTH Aachen (Rheinisch-Westfälische Technische Hochschule Aachen). He is also one of the directors of the RWTH Helmholtz Institute for Biomedical Engineering.

== Boards and Chairs ==
- 2005–2012 – Speaker of the section Molecular Imaging of the working group Methodology and Research of the Deutsche Röntgengesellschaft
- 2008–2012 – chairman of the abovementioned working group
- 2012-onwards – Served in the council of European Society for Molecular Imaging (ESMI)
- 2014–2015 – Chairman of the “Molecular Imaging Subcommittee” of the European Society of Radiology
- 2016 – Program chair of the World Molecular Imaging Congress in New York
- 2018 – Member of the Board of Trustees of the World Molecular Imaging Society (WMIS)
- Current – WMIC Fellow
- Current – Member of the executive board of the Deutsche Gesellschaft für Biomedizinische Technik (German)
- Current – RWTH Aachen University Fellow
- 2023–2024 – President of the ESMI (European Society for Molecular Imaging)

== Research ==
The research of Fabian Kiessling focusses on the development of new imaging methods and probes, with a particular focus on oncology and diseases that go along with angiogenesis and vascular remodeling. He worked on the imaging technique volumetric area detector computed tomography and published the new ultrasound technique Motion Model Ultrasound Localization Microscopy together with his colleague Georg Schmitz. The ultrasound technique was preclinically tested and used in a first clinical application. Both methods allow non-invasive imaging of hair-thin blood vessels in tumors and other tissues. In his translational research, imaging-guided therapy plays an important role including the investigation of biological barriers for drug delivery and the development of strategies to overcome these barriers by the use of nanomedicines, drug delivery systems, and other therapeutics.

== Awards ==
- 2006 Dr. Emil Salzer Prize
- 2006 Richtzenhain Prize
- Highly Cited Researcher (2019–2024) by Clarivate
- Highly Ranked Scholar in Digital Imaging (2024 and 2025) by ScholarGPS
- Listed among Best Scientists in the field of Medicine (2025) by Research.com
- Member of the Academy of Europe (2025)
- Member of the National Academy of Science and Engineering, acatech (2025)
- Arthur Eichengrün Prize (2026) Innovation and Eichengrün Award
- RWTH Innovation Award (2026) Innovation and Eichengrün Award
- Gold Medal of the World Molecular Imaging Society in 2026

== Honors ==
- 2020, he became a Fellow of the World Molecular Imaging Society (WMIS)
- 2022, he became a Fellow of the RWTH Aachen University
- 2022, he became a member of the Sigma Xi Society
- 2025, he became a member of the Academia Europaea
- 2025, he became a member of the National Academy of Science and Engineering, acatech
- 2026, he became an Honorary Member of the European Society for Molecular Imaging (ESMI) (https://www.linkedin.com/posts/profile-areas-of-rwth-aachen-university_profilearea-medst-activity-7445089211000610816-jY86/)
- 2026, he became a Fellow of the International Academy of Artificial Intelligence Sciences (AAIS)
- 5th Master Level WingTsun and 1st Teacher Level Magic Hands of Kan-Ki-Fu as a student of Sifu Keith R. Kernspecht (German Wikipedia)

== Selected publications ==
=== Books edited ===
- Small animal imaging : basics and practical guide. Fabian Kiessling, Bernd J. Pichler, Peter Hauff. Berlin: Springer. 2011. ISBN 978-3-642-12945-2. OCLC 695389190.
- Comprehensive biomedical physics. Anders Brahme. Amsterdam. 2014. ISBN 978-0-444-53632-7. OCLC 907794199.
- Small animal imaging : basics and practical guide. Fabian Kiessling, Bernd J. Pichler, Peter Hauff (Second ed.). Cham, Switzerland. 2017. ISBN 978-3-319-42202-2. OCLC 987910980.
- Molecular imaging in oncology. Otmar Schober, Fabian Kiessling, Jürgen Debus (Second ed.). Cham, Switzerland. 2020. ISBN 978-3-030-42618-7. OCLC 1162846437.

=== Most-cited peer-reviewed journal articles ===
- T Lammers, F Kiessling, WE Hennink, G Storm/ Drug targeting to tumors: Principles, pitfalls and (pre-) clinical progress. Journal of controlled release 161 (2), 175–187 (2012).
- T Lammers, S Aime, WE Hennink, G Storm, F Kiessling. Theranostic Nanomedicine. Accounts of chemical research 44 (10), 1029–1038 (2011)
