= Fabián Santana =

Argentine footballer

Personal information
- Full name: Fabián Ernesto Santana
- Date of birth: July 29, 1985 (age 41)
- Place of birth: General Rodríguez, Argentina
- Height: 1.81 m (5 ft 11 in)
- Position: Defensive midfielder

Team information
- Current team: Barracas Central

Senior career*
Years	Team	Apps	(Gls)
2005–2010	Banfield	80	(3)
2010–2012	Chacarita Juniors	18	(1)
2012–	Barracas Central	68	(3)
- * Club domestic league appearances and goals as of 18 May 2015

Fabián Ernesto Santana (born 29 July 1985 in General Rodríguez, Buenos Aires) is an Argentine football midfielder currently playing for Barracas Central in the Primera B Metropolitana.

== Career ==
Santana made his first team debut with Banfield on 20 February 2005 in a 1–0 away defeat to River Plate. In 2009, he was a non playing member of the squad that won the Apertura 2009 championship.

For the 2010–11 season, Santana was loaned along fellow Banfield player Pablo Vergara to Chacarita Juniors, recently relegated to the Argentine second division.
