= Fabienne Goux-Baudiment =

Fabienne Goux-Baudiment is a French futurist and expert in French prospective, recognized for her work in operational foresight and policy advising. She is the founder and director of the consulting firm proGective, which specializes in foresight research, analysis and implementation.

== Education ==
Goux-Baudiment holds a PhD in human and social foresight from the Gregorian University of Rome (Italy) under the supervision of Eleonora Barbieri Masini. She also holds a master's degree in political science (public policy and international affairs) from France. Her academic training in the social sciences is a cornerstone of her work in futures studies and strategic foresight.

== Career ==
Goux-Baudiment began her career as a foresight research engineer at Conservatoire national des arts et métiers (CNAM), where she developed an interest in societal trends and future-oriented thinking. In 1994, she founded proGective, an independent research center specialising in foresight research, horizon scanning and, strategic analysis.

She was president of the World Futures Studies Federation (2005–2009) and the founding president of the French Society for Foresight (SFDP) from 2013 to 2016. Her consultancy work includes assignments with UNESCO, the European Commission, and the French government.

In addition to consulting, Goux-Baudiment is an active lecturer and global keynote speaker, presenting on foresight and futures-related topics at conferences and corporate events worldwide. Her work includes numerous publications on the methods and applications of operational foresight, and most notably on the development and the implications of the Great Transition and the X.0 development model, which she coined.

Goux-Baudiment also contributes to academia through educational programs and MOOCs (massive open online courses), where she teaches and mentors students in the principles and practices of foresight.

== Selected works ==
- Goux-Baudiment, Fabienne. "Repenser la raison d'être des entreprises", in Le mouvement THE WHY PROJECT, Manifeste (Les Habits Neufs de la Raison d'Etre), Le Cercle de l'Excellence RH, 2020, pp. 109–110.
- Goux-Baudiment, Fabienne. "Qu'est-ce que la Grande Transition ?", in C. AFRIAT, J. THEYS (sous la dir.), La grande transition de l'humanité : De Sapiens àDeus, FYP éditions, 2018, pp. 2746.
- Goux-Baudiment, Fabienne, SOULET Ghislaine, DE COURSON Jacques, Quiz pour conduire un exercice de prospective territoriale, Lyon: CERTU, 2008, 132 pages.
- Goux-Baudiment, Fabienne, Une nouvelle étape du développement de la prospective: la prospective opérationnelle, Rome: Universita Gregoriana, [2002] 2008, 610 pages
- Goux-Baudiment, Fabienne, Donner du futur aux territoires. Guide de prospective territoriale à l'usage des acteurs locaux. Lyon: CERTU, octobre 2000, 276 pages
- Penser le futur. L'essentiel de la prospective et de ses méthodes. Paris: Dunod, avril 2000, 184 pages. [Traduction et adaptation du livre d'Eleonora Barbieri MASINI, Why Futures Studies? Londres: Grey Seal Books, 1993]
