= Fabian McCarthy =

Fabian McCarthy may refer to:

- Fabian McCarthy (rugby union) (born 1919), Australian rugby union player
- Fabian McCarthy (Jamaican footballer) (born 1990), Jamaican football player
- Fabian McCarthy (South African footballer) (born 1977), South African football player
