= Justin Geiser =

American politician

Member-elect of the Missouri House of Representatives from the 31st district
- Assuming office January 6, 2027
- Succeeding: Ron Fowler

Personal details
- Party: Democratic
- Education: San Diego State University
- Website: Campaign website

Justin Geiser is an American politician of the Missouri Democratic Party who is the representative-elect for the 31st district in the Missouri House of Representatives. He was elected in the 2026 general election. Geiser is a veteran of the United States Marine Corps.
