= Fabián Saavedra =

Chilean footballer (born 1992)

Personal information
- Full name: Fabián Andrés Saavedra Múñoz
- Date of birth: 27 January 1992 (age 34)
- Place of birth: Santiago, Chile
- Height: 1.68 m (5 ft 6 in)
- Position: Striker

Team information
- Current team: Lautaro de Buin
- Number: 10

Youth career
- Unión Española

Senior career*
Years	Team	Apps	(Gls)
2011–2018	Unión Española	68	(9)
2012–2013	Unión Española B	38	(8)
2013–2014	→ Cobresal (loan)	9	(1)
2017	→ Cobresal (loan)	15	(1)
2018	→ Santiago Morning (loan)	25	(2)
2019	Cobresal	12	(1)
2020–	Lautaro de Buin	9	(1)
- * Club domestic league appearances and goals as of 16 December 2020

Fabián Andrés Saavedra Muñoz (born 27 January 1992) is a Chile footballer who plays for the Segunda División Profesional de Chile side Lautaro de Buin as a striker.

== Honours ==
Unión Española

- Primera División: 2013 Transición
