= Harish Fabiani =

Indian businessman

- Education: IESE Business School
- Occupation: Businessman
- Known for: Promoting Americorp Ventures and India Land
- Spouse: Roopa Fabiani

Harish Fabiani is a Madrid-based Non-Resident Indian (NRI) businessman.

== Education ==
Fabiani has received his education in Electronics and Telecommunications Engineering from Delhi (1981). His completed further studies in Executive Education in Finance and Corporate Management at IESE Business School in Madrid.

== Career ==
Fabiani has worked in the technology industry, commercial real estate ventures, finance, and trading, and has served as a strategic adviser to companies on issues of corporate governance and transparency. He also assisted in the arrival of José María Aznar, former Prime Minister of Spain, to India in September 2008 to initiate constructive communication with industrialists, businessmen and politicians in order to strengthen economic and political ties between the two nations.

Fabiani serves as the promoter of Americorp Ventures, his flagship company which has investments in a wide spectrum of industries. The Americorp Group, based in Madrid, has in excess of $2 billion of Fabiani assets deployed in private equity, public markets and real estate in the EU and India. The company has been an early stage investor in Indian equities since 1997. It is behind several successful names of the Indian corporate circle - investments include Nimbus, AsiaNet Satellite Communications, TV18, Edelweiss Capital and Indiabulls. Transatlantic Corporation, a fund promoted by Fabiani, had invested $2 million in Indiabulls along with the Lakshmi Mittal-promoted LNM India Internet Ventures.

Additionally, Fabiani is the promoter of India Land, a real estate development company focused on commercial real estate in prominent Indian cities such as Chennai, Coimbatore, and Pune. India Land’s existing projects include Chennai Tech Park, a 2.4 million sq. ft. LEED gold-rated IT park in Ambattur, Chennai, a 1.9 million LEED gold-rated IT SEZ in Saravanampathi, Coimbatore and a 28-acre industrial park in Hinjewadi, Pune.

== Personal life ==
Fabiani is married to Roopa Fabiani.
