= Fabian Kahl =

German art and antique dealer

- Born: 3 October 1991 (age 34)
- Occupations: Art dealer; Antique dealer; Author
- Parents: Holger Kahl (father); Kerstin (mother)
- Website: Personal website (in German)

Fabian Kahl (born 3 October 1991) is a German art and antique dealer and author. In the ZDF series Bares für Rares, Kahl has been seen regularly as a dealer since the first season was broadcast in 2013.

== Life ==
Kahl was born on 3 October 1991 in Thuringia, Germany.

He is a son of the coin and antiques dealer Holger Kahl and his wife Kerstin. He calls on a half-timbered frame yard in Oberoppurg. In 2000, the Kahl family bought Brandenstein Castle in Ranis, Thuringia, and extensively renovated it. Together with his father and brother Tobias Krieg, Fabian Kahl developed to go to flea markets and auctions.

After completing the Realschule, Kahl broke off the technical diploma for design and was active as an antiques dealer at trade fairs and flea markets. At the age of 17, supported by his parents, he ran an antique shop on Berlin's Kurfürstendamm for three months.

In 2012 he moved to Leipzig. From 2013 to 2014 he headed the short-term gallery project for modern art SansvoiX with an attached lounge and event stage, which was played weekly. The gallery featured exhibitions by Luigi Colani, HR Giger and the Tachelesgruppe Berlin, among others. The inventory included twelve segments of the Berlin Wall. According to Kahl, the project failed due to building defects and the tenancy. Today, he runs an antique trade at Brandenstein Castle together with his father and brother. Currently (as of 2018) he does not have his own permanent business premises.

At a market on the agra site in Markkleeberg near Leipzig, Kahl was discovered by a ZDF team and invited to a casting. He was selected and has appeared as a dealer in the Bares series for Rares since the first season of 2013. Kahl was then a guest on programs such as ZDF-Fernsehgarten, Kölner Treff, Riverboat (German TV series), MDR um 4, selbstbestimmt! Das Magazin, DAS!, NDR Talk Show, stern TV, MDR Sputnik, Wer weiß denn sowas?, and Willkommen bei Carmen Nebel. Kahl plays the piano, paints and has written a play and poetry. In March 2018 his book Der Schatzsucher, half autobiography, half antiques guide was published.

Kahl's outfits, hairstyles and piercings testify to his weakness for the Gothic scene, which he has felt a part of since he was 16, but he does not see himself as a „Vollblut-Goth“ ("thoroughbred Goth"). The press sometimes considered him a „Paradiesvogel in der Welt der Antiquitätenhändler“ ("rare bird in the world of antique dealers”). In September 2018, after ten years, he said goodbye to his long and often strikingly colored hair and switched to the short haircut. He has been a vegetarian since he was 15 and is vegan whenever possible. Kahl lives in Leipzig. In 2019 he lived briefly in Cologne.

== Books ==
- Der Schatzsucher: Auf der Jagd nach Kunst und Kuriositäten
