= Fabian Tillanen =

Finnish politician

Fabian Tillanen (8 May 1895, Mäntyharju – 16 September 1976) was a Finnish farmer and politician. He was a Member of the Parliament of Finland from 1947 to 1948, representing the Finnish People's Democratic League (SKDL).
