= Fabian Ajogwu =

Nigerian politician

Fabian Ikenna Ajogwu
- Born: Fabian Ikenna Ajogwu; 23 June 1970 (age 56); Enugu State, Nigeria
- Education: University of Aberdeen, Scotland (PhD, Law), IESE Business School, University of Navarra, Barcelona, Spain (MBA), University of Lagos (LL.M), Nigeria Law School (B.L), University of Nigeria (LL.B)
- Occupations: Lawyer, Senior Advocate of Nigeria, Author
- Spouse: Audrey Ifeoma Ajogwu
- Children: 3
- Awards: Officer of the Order of the Federal Republic (2022), Senior Advocate of Nigeria

Fabian Ikenna Ajogwu, OFR, SAN (born June 1970), is a Nigerian lawyer, Senior Advocate of Nigeria, author, and governance advisor. He is the founder and Senior Partner of KENNA and Nigeria's first professor of corporate governance and holds a full professorship with the Lagos Business School, Pan-Atlantic University, where he has taught since 2000. He served a lead draftsman of the Securities and Exchange Commission Nigeria Code of Corporate Governance (2003) and has served on the boards of organisations including Guinness Nigeria, Stanbic IBTC Holdings, and the Nigerian Sovereign Investment Authority. He has authored books and publications on corporate governance, arbitration, and law.

== Early years and education ==
Fabian Ikenna Ajogwu, OFR, SAN, FCArb was born on 23 June 1970, at the end of the Civil War, to Dr. Michael Ajogwu, SAN, and Mrs. Caroline Ajogwu. His father, a Senior Advocate of Nigeria (K.C. Equivalent), served as the Attorney General of Enugu State; and his mother retired as a School Principal in Enugu. Ajogwu had his formative education at the University of Nigeria Primary School, St. Louis School, Kano, and Federal Government College, Kano. An Alumnus of the Lagos Business School and Said Business School of Oxford University, Professor Ajogwu holds a Ph.D. in Law (corporate governance) from the Taylor School of Law, University of Aberdeen, Scotland; an MBA from the IESE Business School, University of Navarra, Barcelona; and Law degrees from the University of Nigeria and the University of Lagos.

== Career ==
Ajogwu worked at Kenna Partners, a firm he founded on 28 May 1993, and took Silk at age 39. His contributions to legal jurisprudence include having the courts hold that divestment of oil and gas interests, being interests in natural and collective resources, required the consent of the minister of petroleum resources. He also advocated preserving the rights of persons to challenge inconsistent customs trade tariffs in court and had the court strike down the unfair and unconstitutional provisions of the Nigerian Customs & Excise Act.; and a reinforcement of the rights of the maritime regulator to detain ships for non-seaworthiness. He has served as Honorary Counsel to the State of Israel in Nigeria and the Republic of South Africa in Nigeria.

In 2005, Ajogwu founded the Society for Corporate Governance Nigeria, a registered not-for-profit organisation committed to the development of corporate governance and ethical culture in Africa. In 2015, he founded the AIFA Reading Society, a non-profit organisation dedicated to promoting reading culture, and the Society for Art Collection, with an emphasis on supporting the art and art collection. In 2021, he was elected President of the Nigerian Institute of Chartered Arbitrators and is a Fellow of the African Leadership Initiative West Africa; Henry Crown Global Leadership, Aspen Institute; and the Nigerian Institute of Chartered Arbitrators.

Ajogwu serves on the boards of Stanbic IBTC Holdings Plc (member of Standard Bank Group) and Guinness Nigeria Plc (Diageo) and was appointed by the Government of Nigeria to serve as the Distinguished Legal Author on the Council of Legal Education (Nigerian Law School) for two terms consecutively between 2010 and 2018. He served as a member of the General Council of the Bar, responsible for the Nigeria Bar Association. He assisted the Securities & Exchange Commission in drafting Nigeria's pioneer Code of Corporate Governance in 2003; chaired the Nigerian Communications Commission Committee on the Corporate Governance Code for the telecommunications industry 2013; and served on the Financial Reporting Council of Nigeria's Committee on the National Code of Corporate Governance, 2018.

Ajogwu served on the Governing Council of Pan-Atlantic University, chaired Leap Africa, NES Global, ARM-Harith Infrastructure Fund (Nigeria's pioneer infrastructure fund), chairs Novare Malls Group, chaired the Body of Senior Advocates of Nigeria Continuing Legal Education Committee, and serves on the Body's Ethics Committee.

== Books ==
- Corporate Governance in Nigeria: Law & Practice, (Thomson Reuters, Spain, 2020)
- Fair Hearing, (Thomson Reuters (Legal) Spain, 2020)
- The Law & Practice of Private Equity, (Thomson Reuters (Legal), Spain, 2020)
- Commercial Arbitration in Nigeria: Law & Practice (Thomson Reuters, 2019)
- Decoupling Ownership from Management of Companies: Governance Perspectives in the Pursuit of Profits, (Ceenai Publishers, Lagos, 2015)
- Ship Acquisition & Finance: Law & Practice, (Thomson Reuters, Spain, 2020)
- Law & Society, (CCLD, Lagos, 2013)
- Corporate Governance and Group Dynamics, (CCLD, Lagos, 2013)
- Mergers & Acquisition in Nigeria: Law and Practice, (CCLD, Lagos, 2010)
- Corporate Governance in Nigeria: Law and Practice, (CCLD, Lagos, 2007)
- Outcomes-Based Governance: A Modern Approach to Corporate Governance, (King, Mervyn and Ajogwu, Fabian (2020), Juta Publishing, Johannesburg)
- Oral & Written Advocacy: Law & Practice (Solanke, Folake, and Ajogwu, Fabian (2018), Thomson Reuters (Legal) Spain)
- Collecting Art: A Handbook (Ajogwu, Fabian and Castellote, Jess (2017), Bookcraft & Pan-Atlantic University, Ibadan & Lagos)
- Oral & Written Advocacy: Law & Practice, (Solanke, Folake, and Ajogwu, Fabian (2016), Commercial Law Development Services (CLDS), Lagos)
- Trade & Investments in Nigeria: Legal & Regulatory Aspects, (Ajogwu, Fabian and Kenna Partners (2015), Commercial Law Development Services (CLDS), Lagos)
- Petroleum Law & Sustainable Development, (Ajogwu, Fabian and Nliam, Oscar, (2014), Centre for Commercial Law Development (CCLD), Lagos)
- Corporate Governance in Nigeria: Law and Practice, 2nd Edition, (2020), Thomson Reuters (Legal), Pamplona, Spain, 586 pages, ISBN 978-84-1345-035-3.
  - eBook: Thomson Reuters Proview
- Fair Hearing, (2020), Thomson Reuters (Legal), Pamplona, Spain, 236 pages, ISBN 978-978-912-804-4
  - eBook: Thomson Reuters Proview -
- The Law & Practice of Private Equity, (2020) Thomson Reuters (Legal), Pamplona, Spain, 273 pages, ISBN 978-84-1346-638-5
  - eBook: Thomson Reuters Proview -
- Commercial Arbitration in Nigeria: Law and Practice, 3rd Edition, (2019), Thomson Reuters (Legal), Pamplona, Spain, 668 pages, ISBN 978-84-9197-666-0
  - eBook: Thomson Reuters Proview -
- Decoupling Ownership from Management of Companies: Governance Perspectives in the Pursuit of Profits, 3rd Edition, (2019) Ceenai Publishers, Lagos, Nigeria, 74 pages, ISBN 978-978-950-689-7
- Ship Acquisition & Finance: Law & Practice, (2018), Thomson Reuters (Legal), Pamplona, Spain, 255 pages, ISBN 978-84-9197-666-0
  - eBook: Thomson Reuters Proview -
- Ship Acquisition & Finance: Law & Practice, (2017), Commercial Law Development Services (CLDS), Lagos, Nigeria, 255 pages, ISBN 978-978-952-388-7
- Mergers & Acquisition in Nigeria: Law and Practice, 2nd Edition, Centre for Commercial Law Development Services (CLDS), Lagos, Nigeria, 554 pages, ISBN 978-978-942-1510
- Law & Society, (2013), Centre for Commercial Law Development (CCLD), Lagos, Nigeria, 326 pages, ISBN 978-978-936-620-0
  - eBook:
- Corporate Governance and Group Dynamics, (2013), Centre for Commercial Law Development (CCLD), Lagos, Nigeria, 420 pages, ISBN 978-978-919-954-6
  - eBook:
- Commercial Arbitration in Nigeria: Law and Practice, 2nd Edition, (2013), Centre for Commercial Law Development (CCLD), Lagos, Nigeria, 656 pages, ISBN 978-978-919-957-0
- Fair Hearing, Eds (2010) Centre for Commercial Law Development (CCLD), Lagos, Nigeria, 166 pages, ISBN 978-978-912-804-4
- Mergers & Acquisition in Nigeria: Law and Practice, Eds. (2009), Centre for Commercial Law Development (CCLD), Lagos, Nigeria, 925 pages, ISBN 978-978-912-806-8
  - eBook
- Commercial Arbitration in Nigeria: Law and Practice, Eds. (2009), Centre for Commercial Law Development (CCLD), Lagos, Nigeria, 544 pages, ISBN 978-978-901-154-4
- Corporate Governance in Nigeria: Law and Practice, (2009), Centre for Commercial Law Development (CCLD), Lagos, Nigeria, 491 pages, ISBN 978-978-084-464-6 Eds.

== Books co-authored ==
- Outcomes-Based Governance: A Modern Approach to Corporate Governance, (King, Mervyn and Ajogwu, Fabian) (2020), Juta Publishing, Johannesburg, South Africa,
  - eBook: ISBN 978-1485135685 -
- Oral & Written Advocacy: Law & Practice Solanke, Folake and Ajogwu, Fabian (2018), Thomson Reuters (Legal), Pamplona, Spain, 320 pages, ISBN 978-84-9197-663-9
  - eBook: Thomson Reuters Proview -
- Brief Insights: A Selection of Milestone Cases, Ajogwu, Fabian and Kenna Partners (2018), Commercial Law Development Services (CLDS), Lagos, Nigeria, 363 pages, ISBN 978-978-969-193-7
- Collecting Art: A Handbook, Ajogwu, Fabian and Castellote, Jess (2017), Bookcraft & Pan-Atlantic University, Ibadan & Lagos, Nigeria, 285 pages, ISBN 978-978-845-7916
- Oral & Written Advocacy: Law & Practice, Solanke, Folake and Ajogwu, Fabian (2016), Commercial Law Development Services (CLDS), Lagos, Nigeria, 302 pages, ISBN 978-978-952-389-4

== Selected articles ==
- Shareholders Activism: Any Added Value to Governance, Journal of Corporate Governance, ISSN-2006-7801, Vol. 8 No. 1, August 2016, pp 1686 - 1699
- National Code of Corporate Governance: Private Sector Perspective, Journal of Corporate Governance, ISSN-2006-7801, Vol. 7 No. 1, April 2015, pp 1360 - 1375
- Corporate Governance and the Financial Reporting Council of Nigeria Act 2011: Matters Arising, Journal of Corporate Governance, ISSN-2006-7801, Vol. 6. No. 2, August 2014, pp 1065-1083
- Dealing with Guerilla Tactics in International Arbitration: which tools for Counsel and Arbitrators, Dispute Resolution Journal of the Lagos Court of Arbitration, Vol. 1, No. 1, Nov. 2014, pp 40-57
- Public Governance, Public Service, Ethics and Institution Reform: The Inextricable Link, Journal of Corporate Governance, ISSN-2006-7801, Vol. 5, No. 2, Nov. 2013, pp 874-898
- Arbitral Awards: Recognition, Enforcement & Challenge, Journal of the Chartered Institute of Arbitrators Nigeria, ISSN-2006-957X, Vol. 8, No. 1, Sept 2013, pp 22-54
- Challenge and Enforcement of Maritime Arbitration Awards, Journal of the Chartered Institute of Arbitrators Nigeria, ISSN. 2006-957X, Vol. 7, No. 1, Jul 2012, pp. 1 –16
- Corporate Governance against the Background of Debt and Equity, Journal of Corporate Governance, ISSN. 2006-7801, Vol., No.1, pp 696-797
- Corporate Governance and Board Effectiveness in the Nigerian Telecommunications Sector, Journal of Corporate Governance, ISSN-2006-7801, Vol. 4, No.2, Nov 2012, pp. 628-663
- Mergers & Acquisitions: Opportunities & Pitfalls, Journal of Law, Faculty of Law, University of Ibadan, Ibadan, Vol. 1 No. 1, Oct 2011, 30th Anniversary Edn. pp. 1-35
- Corporate Governance and Ethics in Nigeria – The Imperatives, Journal of Corporate Governance, ISSN-2006-7801, Vol. 2. No. 1, Oct 2010, pp. 207-241
- Corporate Acquisitions and Merger in Nigeria – Thresholds and Considerations, Journal of Corporate Governance, ISSN-2006-7801, Vol. 2. No. 1, Oct 2010, pp. 290-320
- The Control Factor in the Separation of Ownership and Management of Companies Operating within Groups, Journal of Corporate Governance, ISSN. 2006-7801, Vol.1 No.2, Jul. 2009, pp. 67 – 86
- Corporate Control and the Pursuit of Profits, From Agency Theory to Modern Corporate Governance, Journal of Corporate Governance, ISSN-2006-7801, Vol.1 No.2, Jul. 2009, pp. 187-207
- Enhancing Board Effectiveness through Committees, Journal of Corporate Governance, ISSN-2006-7801, Vol.1 No. 1, Feb. 2009, pp. 1 – 16
- The Role of the Chairman of the Board, Journal of Corporate Governance, ISSN-2006-7801, Vol.1 No. 1, Feb. 2009, pp 59 – 66
- Steps in Formal Meditation and Conciliation, Journal of the Chartered Institute of Arbitrators Nigeria, ISSN. 2006-957X; Vol. 4, No. 1, pp 54 – 68
- Stay of Proceedings in Arbitration: The Distinction between a Step to Preserve the Res, and a Step in the Proceedings, Journal of the Chartered Institute of Arbitrators Nigeria, ISSN. 2006-957X; Vol. 4, No. 1, pp 14 – 35
- Dispute Handling and Litigation Management, Journal of the Chartered Institute of Arbitrators Nigeria, ISSN. 2006-957X, Vol.3, No. 1, pp 44-48
- Multi-Jurisdictional Compliance in Cyberspace, European Case Clearing House (ECCH), Cranfield University, U.K., Issue No. 28, Spring, pp 14 – 16
- Making Boards More Effective: The Issue of Independence," Lagos Business School Management Review, 2001, Vol. 6 No. 1, pp 38 – 46
