= Fabián Moyano =

Argentine footballer

Personal information
- Full name: Fabián Gustavo Moyano Batres
- Date of birth: 2 January 1986 (age 40)
- Place of birth: Mendoza, Argentina
- Height: 1.90 m (6 ft 3 in)
- Position: Goalkeeper

Youth career
- 2004: Gimnasia de Mendoza
- 2005–2006: Boca Juniors
- 2006–2009: Lanús

Senior career*
Years	Team	Apps	(Gls)
2005	Boca Juniors	0	(0)
2006–2010	Lanús	0	(0)
2009–2010	→ Atlanta (loan)	24	(0)
2010	→ Colegiales (loan)	0	(0)
2011–2012	San Luis	38	(0)
2013–2014	Lota Schwager	41	(0)
2014–2015	Iberia	18	(0)
2015–2019	Deportes Puerto Montt	63	(0)
2020	Desamparados	0	(0)
- * Club domestic league appearances and goals

Fabián Gustavo Moyano Batres (born 2 January 1986) is an Argentine former footballer who played as a goalkeeper.

== Teams ==
- (Argentina) Boca Juniors 2005
- (Argentina) Lanús 2006–2009
- (Argentina) Atlanta 2009–2010
- (Argentina) Colegiales 2010
- (Chile) San Luis de Quillota 2011–2012
- (Chile) Lota Schwager 2013–2014
- (Chile) Iberia 2014–2015
- (Chile) Deportes Puerto Montt 2015–2019
- (Argentina) Desamparados 2020

== Honours ==
Lanús

- Torneo Apertura: 2007
