= Otto Gaiser =

German Luftwaffe ace

- Gaiser as an Oberfeldwebel
- Born: 5 October 1919; Reutlingen
- Died: 22 January 1944 (aged 24) (MIA) disappeared near Berdychiv, Ukraine
- Military career
- Allegiance: Nazi Germany
- Branch: Luftwaffe
- Service years: 1942–1944
- Rank: Leutnant (Posthumously)
- Unit: JG 51
- Conflicts: World War II Eastern Front
- Awards: Knight's Cross of the Iron Cross

Otto Gaiser (5 October 1919 – 22 January 1944) was a Luftwaffe ace with 66 confirmed kills, and he was the recipient of the Knight's Cross of the Iron Cross during World War II. The Knight's Cross of the Iron Cross, and its variants were the highest awards in the military and paramilitary forces of Nazi Germany during World War II.

== Career ==
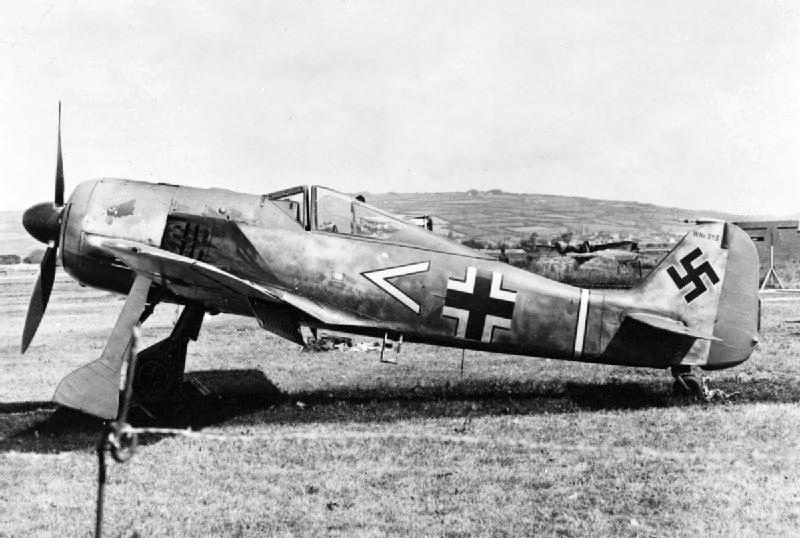
Gaiser flew a Fw 190. (Note: It is not known how many different aircraft Wagner flew while accumulating his 66 kills, his unit was known for flying the Messerschmitt Bf 109 in 1943. The Luftwaffe used the Focke-Wulf Fw 190 aircraft over the eastern front by 1943. See photo of Gaiser with his Fw 190.)

In 1942, Gaiser was assigned to Jagdgeschwader 51 (JG 51—51st Fighter Wing) where he served as Rudolf Wagner's wingman. Wagner went on to become a Luftwaffe ace as well. Gaiser claimed his first kill on 16 March 1943. That day, he shot down a Soviet Lavochkin-Gorbunov-Gudkov LaGG-3 fighter near Vyazma. Gaiser served with 10. Staffel of JG 51 which at the time was under the command of Oberleutnant Horst-Günther von Fassong. He achieved his 10th victory on 11 July, when he claimed another LaGG-3 shot down. Gaiser claimed 17 victories in August, including five Soviet Ilyushin Il-2 ground-attack aircraft shot down on 14 August, making him an "ace-in-a-day".

On 22 January 1944, Gaiser was last seen in combat with Ilyushin Il-2 ground-attack aircraft near Berdychiv, Ukraine. He has remained missing to this day. It is thought he became a victim of the Soviet ground defences. Posthumously, Gaiser was awarded the Knight's Cross of the Iron Cross (Ritterkreuz des Eisernen Kreuzes) on 9 June 1944 for 74 aerial victories claimed. He was also posthumously promoted to Leutnant (second lieutenant).

== Summary of career ==
=== Aerial victory claims ===
According to US historian David T. Zabecki, Gaiser was credited with 66 aerial victories. Obermaier also states that he was credited with 66 victories claimed in 380 combat missions. Spick however lists him with 74 aerial victories claimed in an unknown number of combat missions. Mathews and Foreman, authors of Luftwaffe Aces – Biographies and Victory Claims, researched the German Federal Archives and found records for 66 aerial victory claims, all of which claimed on the Eastern Front.

Victory claims were logged to a map-reference (PQ = Planquadrat), for example "PQ 35 Ost 36624". The Luftwaffe grid map (Jägermeldenetz) covered all of Europe, western Russia and North Africa and was composed of rectangles measuring 15 minutes of latitude by 30 minutes of longitude, an area of about 360 square miles (930 km^{2}). These sectors were then subdivided into 36 smaller units to give a location area 3 km × 4 km (1.9 mi × 2.5 mi) in size.

Chronicle of aerial victories
This and the ♠ (Ace of spades) indicates those aerial victories which made Gaiser an "ace-in-a-day", a term which designates a fighter pilot who has shot down five or more airplanes in a single day.
| Claim | Date | Time | Type | Location | Claim | Date | Time | Type | Location |
– 10. Staffel of Jagdgeschwader 51 – Eastern Front — 4 February – 31 December 1943
| 1 | 16 March 1943 | 15:40 | LaGG-3 | PQ 35 Ost 36624, 30 km (19 mi) northeast of Vyazma | 32 | 24 August 1943 | 05:44 | Pe-2 | 2 km (1.2 mi) east of Krasnaya Yaruga |
| 2 | 11 April 1943 | 05:56 | Pe-2 | PQ 35 Ost 16621, 5 km (3.1 mi) south of the Ryta | 33 | 13 September 1943 | 11:25 | Boston | 1 km (0.62 mi) south of Nowo-Troizkoje |
| 3 | 7 May 1943 | 04:55 | Il-2 | PQ 35 Ost 63174, 2 km (1.2 mi) south of Shidkowa; 10 km (6.2 mi) west of Zmiyovka | 34 | 14 September 1943 | 06:06 | Yak-1 | PQ 35 Ost 69684, east of Volhynia |
| 4 | 7 May 1943 | 05:08 | Il-2 | PQ 35 Ost 63191, 1 km (0.62 mi) north of Prokowskoje; 10 km (6.2 mi) east of Zmiyovka | 35 | 19 September 1943 | 15:13 | Il-2 m.H. (Note: The "m.H." refers to an Ilyushin Il-2 with rear gunner (mit Heckschütze).) | 1 km (0.62 mi) southeast of Synelnykove |
| 5 | 14 May 1943 | 18:27 | La-5 | PQ 35 Ost 63344, 12 km (7.5 mi) east of Semenkowo; 15 km (9.3 mi) southwest of Glazunowka | 36 | 20 September 1943 | 06:38 | Il-2 m.H. | 10 km (6.2 mi) east of Dnipropetrovsk |
| 6 | 2 June 1943 | 07:45 | LaGG-3 | PQ 35 Ost 63563, 10 km (6.2 mi) southwest of Maloarkhangelsk | 37 | 20 September 1943 | 06:40 | Il-2 m.H. | PQ 34 Ost 49534, 4 km (2.5 mi) southwest of Nowosselka |
| 7 | 6 July 1943 | 15:08 | Il-2 m.H. | PQ 35 Ost 63583, 2 km (1.2 mi) west of Ponyri; 20 km (12 mi) southwest of Maloarkhangelsk | 38♠ | 26 September 1943 | 08:28 | Yak-1 | 1 km (0.62 mi) southwest of Novoselovka |
| 8 | 9 July 1943 | 08:43 | Il-2 m.H. | PQ 35 Ost 63713, 3 km (1.9 mi) west of Stanovoye; Dmitriyevka-L'govskiy area | 39♠ | 26 September 1943 | 13:32 | Yak-1 | PQ 34 Ost 58543, 3 km (1.9 mi) west of Orljansk east of Dnipropetrovsk |
| 9 | 10 July 1943 | 12:50 | LaGG-3 | PQ 35 Ost 63513, 3 km (1.9 mi) southwest of Nikolskoje; 15 km (9.3 mi) south-southwest of Maloarkhangelsk | 40♠ | 26 September 1943 | 13:38 | Yak-1 | PQ 34 Ost 58513, 1 km (0.62 mi) south of Majatschka |
| 10 | 11 July 1943 | 18:02 | Il-2 m.H. | 7 km (4.3 mi) southwest of Maloarkhangelsk; 10 km (6.2 mi) southwest of Maloarkhangelsk | 41♠ | 26 September 1943 | 16:38 | Yak-1 | PQ 34 Ost 58563, 1 km (0.62 mi) east of Kalinowka |
| 11 | 12 July 1943 | 07:05 | La-5 | PQ 35 Ost 63222, 4 km (2.5 mi) northeast of Panikowez; 10 km (6.2 mi) east of Zalegoshch | 42♠ | 26 September 1943 | 16:39 | Yak-1 | PQ 34 Ost 58562, 1 km (0.62 mi) north of Krental |
| 12 | 12 July 1943 | 19:30 | La-5 | PQ 35 Ost 63222, 3 km (1.9 mi) north of Malinowez; 10 km (6.2 mi) east of Zalegoshch | 43 | 27 September 1943 | 06:21 | La-5 | PQ 34 Ost 59752, 2 km (1.2 mi) east of Aleksejewka |
| 13 | 13 July 1943 | 07:20 | MiG-3 | PQ 35 Ost 74753, 2 km (1.2 mi) west of Raksino; 25 km (16 mi) south of Lipitsy | 44 | 27 September 1943 | 09:40 | Yak-1 | PQ 34 Ost 58684, 1 km (0.62 mi) north of Iwanowka |
| 14 | 13 July 1943 | 18:32 | LaGG-3 | PQ 35 Ost 64882, 2 km (1.2 mi) south of Krassnij; 15 km (9.3 mi) northeast of Zalegoshch | 45 | 27 September 1943 | 16:30 | P-39 | PQ 34 Ost 58642, 1 km (0.62 mi) northwest of Tiefenbrunn |
| 15 | 17 July 1943 | 08:13 | Il-2 m.H. | PQ 35 Ost 63672, 2 km (1.2 mi) west of Kusnetschki; 15 km (9.3 mi) south-southeast of Maloarkhangelsk | 46 | 30 September 1943 | 11:32 | La-5 | PQ 34 Ost 49311, 2 km (1.2 mi) east of Annewka |
| 16 | 2 August 1943 | 08:33 | Il-2 m.H. | PQ 35 Ost 53631, 6 km (3.7 mi) south-southeast of Shislowo vicinity of Trosna | 47 | 1 October 1943 | 10:40 | Yak-1 | 1 km (0.62 mi) southwest of Jakowlewka |
| 17 | 2 August 1943 | 08:35 | Il-2 m.H. | PQ 35 Ost 63633, 3 km (1.9 mi) north of Koslowko vicinity of Trosna | 48 | 3 October 1943 | 11:04 | Yak-1 | PQ 34 Ost 49323, 1 km (0.62 mi) northeast of Domotkan |
| 18 | 2 August 1943 | 08:40 | Il-2 m.H. | PQ 35 Ost 53661, 7 km (4.3 mi) northeast of Trosna; 10 km (6.2 mi) southwest of Trosna | 49 | 7 October 1943 | 10:00 | Yak-9 | 1 km (0.62 mi) south of Perewolotschnaja |
| 19 | 6 August 1943 | 14:37 | La-5 | PQ 35 Ost 53182, Schachowzy vicinity of Schachowzny | 50 | 8 October 1943 | 15:30 | Yak-9 | 5 km (3.1 mi) south of Perewolotschnaja |
| 20 | 10 August 1943 | 11:13 | Il-2 m.H. | PQ 35 Ost 61751, 6 km (3.7 mi) northeast of Dergatschij | 51 | 12 October 1943 | 12:48 | Il-2 m.H. | PQ 26 Ost 15513, 1 km (0.62 mi) east of Demkino |
| 21 | 10 August 1943 | 11:15 | Il-2 m.H. | PQ 35 Ost 61593, 9 km (5.6 mi) northwest of Lipzy | 52 | 14 October 1943 | 08:07 | Yak-1 | PQ 35 Ost 15523, 2 km (1.2 mi) east of Nikolenka |
| 22 | 10 August 1943 | 13:53 | Yak-1 | PQ 35 Ost 61593, 2 km (1.2 mi) west of Ljutowka | 53 | 14 October 1943 | 11:33 | Pe-2 | PQ 35 Ost 15723, 2 km (1.2 mi) east of Studenez |
| 23 | 11 August 1943 | 07:32 | La-5 | PQ 35 Ost 70722, north of Izyum | 54 | 14 October 1943 | 11:37 | Pe-2 | PQ 35 Ost 15761, 1 km (0.62 mi) north of Rasdel |
| 24♠ | 14 August 1943 | 18:17 | Il-2 m.H. | 4 km (2.5 mi) north of Bachmetjewka | 55 | 17 October 1943 | 10:54 | Yak-1 | PQ 35 Ost 06193, southeast of Shabino |
| 25♠ | 14 August 1943 | 18:19 | Il-2 m.H. | PQ 35 Ost 50254, 2 km (1.2 mi) northwest of Pankowka | 56 | 18 October 1943 | 08:27 | Yak-1 | PQ 26 Ost 97893, 7 km (4.3 mi) northeast of Nevel |
| 26♠ | 14 August 1943 | 18:22 | Il-2 m.H. | PQ 35 Ost 50224, 1 km (0.62 mi) north of Buzkiy | 57 | 1 November 1943 | 13:17 | Il-2 m.H. | 2 km (1.2 mi) northwest of Bolshaja-Snamenka |
| 27♠ | 14 August 1943 | 18:23 | Il-2 m.H. | PQ 35 Ost 50223, 3 km (1.9 mi) north of Dobropolye | 58 | 5 November 1943 | 11:24 | La-5 | PQ 34 Ost 49714, 1 km (0.62 mi) east of Udatschnaja |
| 28♠ | 14 August 1943 | 18:25 | Il-2 m.H. | PQ 35 Ost 50221, 3 km (1.9 mi) north of Dobropolye | 59 | 27 November 1943 | 13:50 | Yak-9 | PQ 34 Ost 47231, 5 km (3.1 mi) southwest of Wesseloje |
| 29 | 15 August 1943 | 13:28 | Il-2 m.H. | PQ 35 Ost 70782, 4 km (2.5 mi) west of Kotijary | 60 | 28 November 1943 | 11:10 | La-5 | 2 km (1.2 mi) southeast of Jelisarowo railway station 45 km (28 mi) south-southwest of Dnipropetrovsk |
| 30 | 18 August 1943 | 05:54 | La-5 | 4 km (2.5 mi) northwest of Dolgenskaja | 61 | 28 November 1943 | 13:25 | Yak-9 | PQ 34 Ost 48642, 5 km (3.1 mi) south of Dnjeprowka |
| 31 | 22 August 1943 | 17:35 | Pe-2 | PQ 35 Ost 50223, 3 km (1.9 mi) southeast of Dopropolje | | | | | |
– 10. Staffel of Jagdgeschwader 51 – Eastern Front — 1–22 January 1944
| 62 | 12 January 1944 | 12:10 | Il-2 m.H. | PQ 25 Ost 80691; 40 km (25 mi) southeast of Vinnytsia | 65 | 15 January 1944 | 14:31 | Il-2 m.H. | PQ 25 Ost 90712; 40 km (25 mi) east of Vinnytsia |
| 63 | 15 January 1944 | 09:17 | Yak-4 | PQ 25 Ost 80661; 30 km (19 mi) east-northeast of Vinnytsia | 66 | 15 January 1944 | 14:36 | Il-2 m.H. | PQ 25 Ost 90522; 45 km (28 mi) south-southeast of Koziatyn |
| 64 | 15 January 1944 | 09:20 | Yak-4 | PQ 25 Ost 80633; 25 km (16 mi) south-southeast of Koziatyn | | | | | |

=== Awards ===
- Iron Cross (1939) 2nd and 1st Class
- German Cross in Gold on 28 January 1944 as Feldwebel in the 10./Jagdgeschwader 51
- Honor Goblet of the Luftwaffe on 3 April 1944 as Feldwebel and pilot
- Knight's Cross of the Iron Cross on 9 June 1944 as Oberfeldwebel and pilot in 10./Jagdgeschwader 51
