= Fabian Perez =

Argentine artist

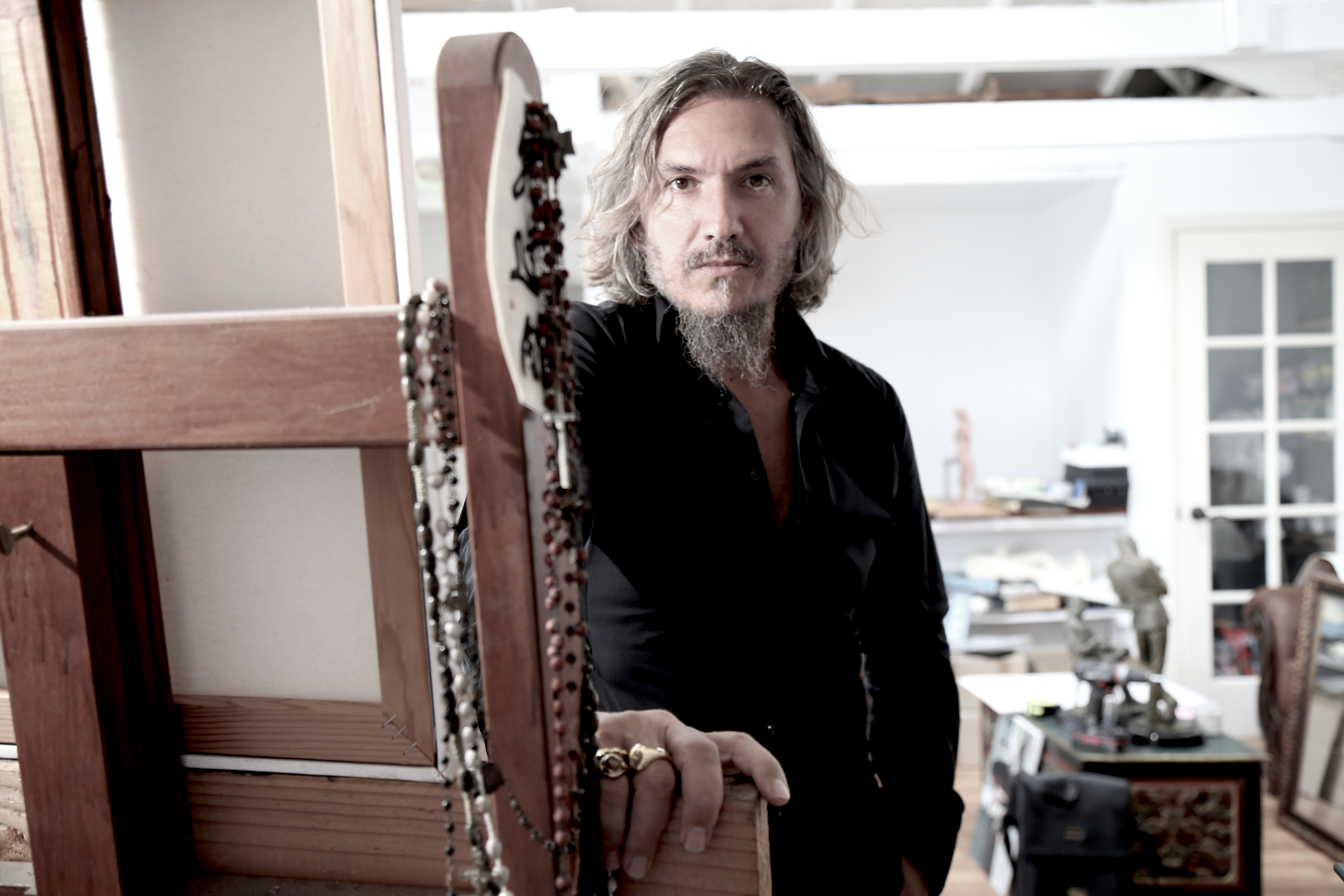
Fabian Perez, Argentine painter

Fabian Perez (Spanish: Fabián Pérez) is a visual artist from Buenos Aires, Argentina, known for his paintings of tango and flamenco dancing and nightclub life, as well as for his acknowledged portraits of world celebrities. Perez' artwork has gained considerable international attention and praise from qualified sources. The artist has proposed "Neo emotionalism" as the name to designate his art style characterized by emotion, mundane passion, dramatic narrative, and a heady atmosphere. He was born on November 2, 1967.

== Biography ==
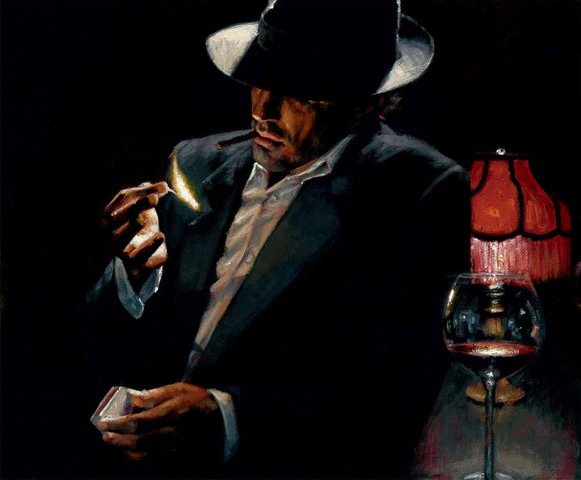
Man Lighting a Cigarette II

The son of a nightclub governor and a lady school teacher and singer, Perez grew up in the village of Campana, near Buenos Aires. Orphan from both parents while a teenager, Perez practiced football and martial arts as a youngster. He left his hometown at the age of 20 and began to travel the world seeking to develop the artistic talent inherited from his mother. He currently resides in Los Angeles.

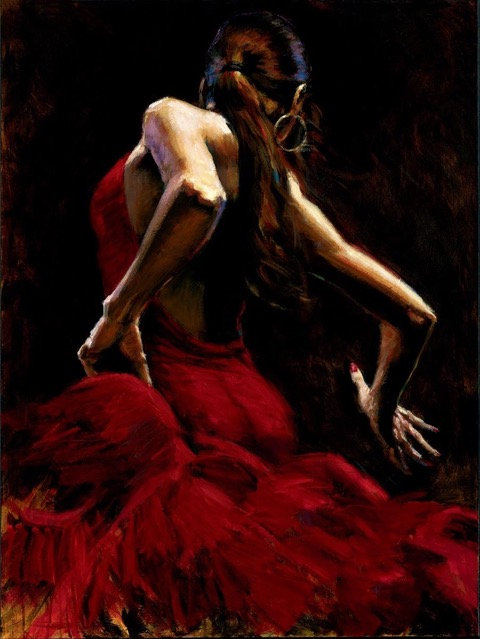
Dancer in Red

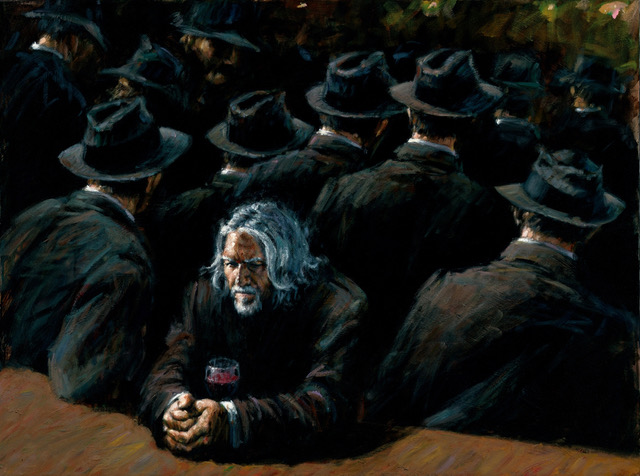
Untitled II

== Career ==
Perez's artwork has been exhibited in many art galleries worldwide. In the US, his paintings have been shown at Parkwest Gallery (Southfield, MI), Pure Gallery (Mechanicsburg, PA), and Village Galleries (Lake Forest and Laguna Beach, CA). In the UK, his art has been exhibited at Clarendon Fine Art, (London), Trent Galleries, Dorchester Gallery(Dorset), Lemongrove Gallery (Chiswick), Artique Gallery (Cambridge), Whitewall Galleries, and MEME Art Gallery (Manchester), among others.

In 2009 Perez was named official artist of the 10th annual Latin Grammy Awards. On the occasion, Perez's artwork was described by Gabriel Abaroa as "filled with energy and emotion that captures the excitement and passion of the performer". His art has been also characterized by "a passionate, narrative style, and a beautifully conveyed sense of latent energy".

In 2010, one of his paintings was chosen to advertise the 2010 Winter Olympics. In 2011, Perez was appointed to design the LG trophy for Copa América. In 2014, Perez was presented with the ATIM Masters Award as "master of the year" by the ArtTour International magazine.

The artist has been commissioned to paint a number of influential people in the world, forming part of his Collection of Living Legends. The series includes, among many, Pope Francis, the President of Argentina, Mauricio Macri, actors Arnold Schwarzenegger and Al Pacino, and tennis star Rafael Nadal. His portrait of Argentine footballer Lionel Messi was complimented in official FIFA sources, and is included in the FIFA News online art banner From the Pitch to the Canvas.

He has published several books of his art, among them All the Romance We Left Behind (2009, 2011), and Neo-emotionalism (2009, 2011). An extensive account of Perez' art and career has been published online by Whitewall Galleries. His oeuvre is also visible in augmented reality on the mobile app Fabián Perez AR, available from Google Play. Perez is a known philanthropist.
