= Fabián Ríos =

Fabián Ríos may refer to:

- Fabián Ríos (politician) (born 1964), Argentine politician
- Fabián Ríos (actor) (born 1980), Colombian actor and model
