= Fabián Ramos =

Chilean footballer (born 1994)

Personal information
- Full name: Fabián Nicolás Ramos Paz
- Date of birth: 12 August 1994 (age 32)
- Place of birth: Santa Fe, Argentina
- Height: 1.73 m (5 ft 8 in)
- Position: Midfielder

Youth career
- Universidad de Chile
- Unión Española
- Cobreloa

Senior career*
Years	Team	Apps	(Gls)
2015	Incas del Sur	–	(–)
2016–2017	Deportes Recoleta	17	(0)
2018	Brujas de Salamanca	–	(–)
2019	Rodelindo Román	–	(–)
2020–2021	Deportes Iquique	11	(0)
2021	Rodelindo Román	12	(2)
- * Club domestic league appearances and goals as of 17 July 2022

Fabián Nicolás Ramos Paz (born 12 August 1994) is an Argentine-born Chilean footballer who plays as a midfielder. He last played for Chilean Segunda División side Rodelindo Román.

== Career ==
In his early life, Ramos was with the youth teams of Universidad de Chile, Unión Española and Cobreloa. Later, he played for several amateur clubs at the Tercera A and at the Tercera B, the fourth and the fifth level of the Chilean football respectively, getting the 2019 Tercera B Championship with Rodelindo Román.

For the 2020 season, he signed with Chilean Primera División side Deportes Iquique. The next season, he returned to Rodelindo Román, then a club promoted to the Chilean Segunda División.

== Personal life ==
In 2019, Ramos made appearances in a docu-reality series about the football club Rodelindo Román called "Rodelindo Román: Del barrio al mundo" (Rodelindo Román: From neighborhood to the world) broadcast by both CDF and Chilevisión, where he was nicknamed El Especialista (The Specialist).

== Honours ==
Rodelindo Román

- Tercera B: 2019
