= Fabian Holland =

Fabian Holland may refer to:

- Fabian Holland (footballer)
- Fabian Holland (rugby union)
