= Sabidia gens =

The gens Sabidia was an obscure plebeian family at ancient Rome. Few members of this gens are mentioned in ancient writers, but a number are known from inscriptions.

== Origin ==
The nomen Sabidius belongs to a large class of gentilicia formed using the suffix -idius. These typically formed from cognomina ending in -idus, but the suffix was one of a number which came to be regarded as a regular gentile-forming suffix, and was applied even in cases where there was no morphological justification. There is no evidence of a surname Sabidus, but the name might be etymologically related to Safini, an Oscan name for the Sabines and their descendants.

== Members ==
This list includes abbreviated praenomina. For an explanation of this practice, see filiation.

- Manius Sabidius M'. f., legate in Sicily in an uncertain year during the late Republic.
- Sabidius, a friend of Gaius Antonius Hybrida, whom he supported in his candidacy for the praetorship of 66 BC. Antonius went on to become consul in 63.
- Publius Sabidius, one of the municipal duumvirs at Ostia in AD 18. He had held the office once before.
- Sabidius Pollio, said by Apollonides of Nicaea to have forged the letters attributed to Aratus, and some of those attributed to Xenophon. Some scholars have suggested that he might be the Sabidius famously but enigmatically addressed by Martial. (Note: Non amo te, Sabidi, nec possum dicere quare; hoc tantum possum dicere, non amo te. "I do not love thee, Sabidius, nor can I say why; this only I can say, I do not love thee." This epigram is the source of the English rhyme, Doctor Fell.)
- Publius Sabidius Pollio, praetor urbanus in an uncertain year; perhaps the same person as Publius Subidius Pollio, aedile in AD 30.
- Sabidius Severus, (Note: The manuscript has Safidius, which Schryver amends to Sabidius.) one of the speakers in a dialogue by Apuleius, debating the values of common sense and patriotism.

== See also ==
- List of Roman gentes

== Bibliography ==
- Quintus Tullius Cicero, De Petitione Consulatus (attributed).
- Marcus Valerius Martialis (Martial), Epigrammata (Epigrams).
- Lucius Appuleius, Florida.
- Richard Bentley, "Dissertation upon the Epistles of Euripides", in Dr. Richard Bentley's Dissertations, Wilhelm Wagner, ed., S. Calvary & Co., Berlin (1874), pp. 554–568.
- Dictionary of Greek and Roman Biography and Mythology, William Smith, ed., Little, Brown and Company, Boston (1849).
- Theodor Mommsen et alii, Corpus Inscriptionum Latinarum (The Body of Latin Inscriptions, abbreviated CIL), Berlin-Brandenburgische Akademie der Wissenschaften (1853–present).
- Notizie degli Scavi di Antichità (News of Excavations from Antiquity, abbreviated NSA), Accademia dei Lincei (1876–present).
- George Davis Chase, "The Origin of Roman Praenomina", in Harvard Studies in Classical Philology, vol. VIII, pp. 103–184 (1897).
- Paul von Rohden, Elimar Klebs, & Hermann Dessau, Prosopographia Imperii Romani (The Prosopography of the Roman Empire, abbreviated PIR), Berlin (1898).
