= Fabian Norberg =

Swedish ice hockey player

- Born: July 13, 1995 (age 30) Sweden
- Height: 5 ft 10 in (178 cm)
- Weight: 185 lb (84 kg; 13 st 3 lb)
- Position: Defence
- Shot: Left
- Played for: Modo Hockey; BIK Karlskoga; Örnsköldsvik HF; KB65 HK; Svedjeholmens IF
- NHL draft: Undrafted
- Playing career: 2013–2021

Fabian Norberg (born July 13, 1995) is a Swedish ice hockey defenceman. He is currently playing with Modo Hockey of the Swedish Hockey League (SHL).

Norberg made his Swedish Hockey League debut playing with Modo Hockey during the 2013–14 SHL season.

== Career statistics ==
			Regular season					Playoffs
Season	Team	League	GP	G	A	Pts	PIM	GP	G	A	Pts	PIM
2010–11	MODO Hockey U16	U16 SM	8	1	0	1	2	—	—	—	—	—
2010–11	MODO Hockey J18	J18 Elit	2	0	0	0	0	—	—	—	—	—
2011–12	MODO Hockey J18	J18 Elit	21	2	6	8	0	—	—	—	—	—
2011–12	MODO Hockey J18	J18 Allsvenskan	18	3	5	8	2	2	0	0	0	0
2012–13	MODO Hockey J18	J18 Elit	21	6	15	21	6	—	—	—	—	—
2012–13	MODO Hockey J18	J18 Allsvenskan	9	2	1	3	0	2	0	0	0	0
2012–13	MODO Hockey J20	J20 SuperElit	10	0	1	1	0	7	0	0	0	2
2013–14	MODO Hockey J20	J20 SuperElit	44	0	6	6	18	6	0	1	1	4
2013–14	MODO Hockey	SHL	1	0	0	0	0	—	—	—	—	—
2014–15	MODO Hockey J20	J20 SuperElit	29	0	4	4	10	5	0	0	0	2
2014–15	MODO Hockey	SHL	2	0	0	0	0	—	—	—	—	—
2014–15	BIK Karlskoga	HockeyAllsvenskan	5	0	0	0	0	—	—	—	—	—
2014–15	Örnsköldsvik HF	Hockeyettan	4	0	2	2	0	2	0	0	0	0
2015–16	Örnsköldsvik HF	Hockeyettan	34	4	6	10	10	2	0	0	0	0
2016–17	Örnsköldsvik HF	Hockeyettan	34	3	7	10	18	4	0	0	0	2
2017–18	Örnsköldsvik HF	Hockeyettan	31	1	3	4	4	—	—	—	—	—
2018–19	KB65 HK	Division 3	12	5	2	7	4	—	—	—	—	—
2019–20	Svedjeholmens IF	Division 3	7	—	—	—	—	—	—	—	—	—
2020–21	Svedjeholmens IF	Division 3	6	3	6	9	0	—	—	—	—	—
SHL totals			3	0	0	0	0	—	—	—	—	—
HockeyAllsvenskan totals			5	0	0	0	0	—	—	—	—	—
Hockeyettan totals			103	8	18	26	32	8	0	0	0	2
