= Fabián Muñoz (Chilean footballer) =

Chilean footballer (born 1978)

Personal information
- Full name: Fabián Enrique Muñoz Hormazábal
- Date of birth: December 20, 1978 (age 47)
- Place of birth: Santiago, Chile
- Height: 1.70 m (5 ft 7 in)
- Position: Centre-forward

Youth career
- Cobreloa
- Colo-Colo Juniors

Senior career*
Years	Team	Apps	(Gls)
1997-1999	Cobreloa	-	(-)
1999-2000	Barnechea	-	(-)
2000-2001	Unión La Calera	-	(-)
2001-2002	Deportes Melipilla	-	(-)
2002-2003	Unión San Felipe	6	(3)
2003-2004	Santiago Wanderers	2	(0)
2004-2005	Deportes Concepción	-	(-)
2005-2006	Deportes Arica	-	(-)
2006-2007	Deportivo Zacapa	32	(17)
2007-2008	Comunicaciones	32	(6)
2008-2010	Deportivo Zacapa	38	(14)
2010	Coban Imperial	-	(-)
2010-2011	Universidad San Carlos	16	(2)
2011-2013	San Marcos	30	(10)
- * Club domestic league appearances and goals as of 1 January 2013

Fabián Enrique Muñoz Hormazábal (born December 20, 1978) is a Chilean former footballer who played as a forward.
