= Fabiano (footballer, born January 1975) =

Brazilian footballer

Personal information
- Full name: Fabiano Pereira de Camargo
- Date of birth: 25 January 1975 (age 51)
- Place of birth: Araras, Brazil
- Height: 1.86 m (6 ft 1 in)
- Position: Goalkeeper

Youth career
- –1995: Ponte Preta

Senior career*
Years	Team	Apps	(Gls)
1995–1997	Ponte Preta		
1998–2001	Portuguesa	103	(0)
2000	→ Cruzeiro (loan)	8	(0)
2001–2003	América Mineiro		
2003	→ Ponte Preta (loan)		
2004–2005	São Caetano		
2005	Juventude		
2006	CRB		
2007–2008	Flamengo-SP		
- * Club domestic league appearances and goals as of 22 March 2024

Fabiano Pereira de Camargo (born 25 January 1975) is a Brazilian former professional footballer who played as a goalkeeper.

== Career ==
Revealed by AA Ponte Preta, Fabiano stood out especially in Portuguesa, where he was elected the best goalkeeper in the state in 1998. He was Minas Gerais champion with América in 2001.

On 1 July 2003, he physically attacked referee Marcos Tadeu Silva Mafra after a last-minute penalty in favor of Avaí. Fabiano claims to have been taken to a room by military police and beaten until he lost consciousness.

He was also part of the squad of AD São Caetano champion of São Paulo, this time as a reserve. He was unable to resume his career after the attack. Years later, however, he said he had no regrets. Currently works with custom furniture in São Paulo.

== Honours ==
América

- Campeonato Mineiro: 2001

São Caetano

- Campeonato Paulista: 2004
