= Fabiano =

Fabiano is both a given name and a surname. Notable people with the name include:

== Given name ==
- Fabian (entertainer), real name Fabiano Anthony Forte, American singer and entertainer
- Fabiano (footballer, born January 1975), full name Fabiano Pereira de Camargo, Brazilian football goalkeeper
- Fabiano (footballer, born August 1975), full name Fabiano Cezar Viegas, Brazilian football centre-back
- Fabiano Freitas, football goalkeeper
- Fabiano Cangelosi (born 1987), Italian-Australian lawyer and politician
- Fabiano Caruana (born 1992), Italian-American chess Grandmaster
- Fabiano de Lima Campos Maria (born 1985), Brazilian footballer
- Fabiano de Paula (born 1988), Brazilian professional tennis player
- Fabiano Iha (born 1970), retired Brazilian mixed martial artist
- Fabiano Joseph Naasi (born 1985), Tanzanian long-distance runner
- Fabiano Lima Rodrigues (born 1979), Brazilian footballer
- Fabiano Machado (born 1986), Brazilian professional racing driver
- Fabiano Peçanha (born 1982), Brazilian middle distance runner
- Fabiano Pereira (born 1978), Brazilian footballer
- Fabinho Recife (born 1982), Brazilian footballer, real name Fabiano Aguiar Dionizio Laurentino
- Fabiano Silveira (born 1974), Brazilian lawyer and politician
- Fabiano Souza (born 1975), Luiz Fabiano Souza, Brazilian forward
- Fabiano (footballer, born 1982), Fabiano Medina da Silva, Brazilian midfielder
- Fabiano (footballer, born 1983), Francisco Fabiano Pereira Marciano, Brazilian defender
- Fabiano (footballer, born 1984), Fabiano Vieira Soares, Brazilian striker
- Fabiano (footballer, born 1990), Fabiano da Silva Souza, Brazilian left back
- Fabiano (footballer, born 2000), Fabiano Josué de Souza Silva, Brazilian right back
- Fabiano (footballer, born 2006), Fabiano Rodrigues Pereira, Brazilian forward

== Surname ==
- Anthony Fabiano (born 1993), American football center for the Indianapolis Colts
- Fabien Fabiano (1882–1962), French illustrator, portrait painter, and designer
- Gerard Fabiano (born 1983), American Magic: The Gathering player
- Luís Fabiano (born 1980), Brazilian footballer
- Michael Fabiano (born 1984), American opera singer
- Ney Fabiano (born 1979), Brazilian footballer
- Nicolas Fabiano (born 1981), French footballer
- Wagnney Fabiano (born 1975), Brazilian mixed martial artist
