= Fabian Debora =

Chicano artist

Fabian Debora (born November 11, 1975) is a Chicano artist based out of East Los Angeles known for paintings that capture the immigrant and gang experiences in Los Angeles. His works include graffiti, murals, sketches, and fine art paintings.

== Early life ==
Fabian was born in El Paso, Texas, to Mexican immigrant parents. His family moved to the affordable housing projects in Boyle Heights, East Los Angeles. Struggling with poverty, lack of resources, exposure to gang violence, and a father in and out of jail, Debora struggled with anger issues and used his artwork as an outlet. During his middle school years he attended Dolores Mission Catholic School, and was kicked out after lashing out at a teacher who ripped up his artwork in class. After this, Debora was sent to public school where exposure to gang-related activity increased. Debora joined a gang at the age of 12 and at the same time was put on probation for truancy and spent time in juvenile hall around five different times for different reasons, one being carrying a firearm at school.

== East Los Angeles gang activity ==
After being forced to attend public school, Fabian joined a gang at the age of 12. Growing up in one of the most violent areas in Los Angeles, Fabian Debora began to graffiti tag around his neighbourhood at thirteen years old. Submerged in the streets of one of the most violent gangs in East LA, Debora joined one the gangs “which plagued the housing projects” that Debora's family lived in. Fabian Debora acquired the gang name of “Spade." While in the East LA gang, Debora began to deal drugs as well as abuse them; gang activity marked the start of a battle with substance abuse.

== Substance abuse ==
After joining a gang, Debora began using drugs in high school. He began with marijuana, but after smoking crack-laced marijuana, he began smoking crack. Eventually, he became addicted to methamphetamines. The substance abuse worsened his situation at home and his relationship with his mother. After he threatened her one-day, she reported it to the police, yet stated she just wanted him to get help for his drug problem. He participated in a one-year rehabilitation program, yet failed to pass drug tests several times, leading to going back to jail. After attempting to commit suicide in 2006, Debora had a religious experience where he says he interacted with God. This led him to go to rehab again and has been sober ever since, and went to school for drug counseling. He is now certified by the state of California to be a licensed drug counselor.

== Art ==
Despite not having an MFA, Debora has the skills of a masterful painter. He began using art as a form of self expression while in middle school by drawing during class in order to help him cope with living in the impoverished Boyle Heights housing projects with an absent father. When he joined a gang, he went under the name “spade” and began to be a graffiti tagger. He used graffiti as well as a form of artistic expression and unknowingly was working on his craft. Once he was older, in between being in and out of jail, he became a tattoo artist, giving tattoos to get extra cash through his art. Debora began painting murals throughout his community and since 1997 has produced over seven murals throughout the L.A. area and many more throughout various different cities.He took up acrylic painting, which is the medium he uses for most of his work. Debora studied under Vincent Valdez for three months. He has won several awards for his art.

== Work ==
After his spiritual awakening Debora went to Homeboy industries to get a job. However, he realized that the facility was a lacking a drug counseling program which was integral to helping ex-gang members and others at risk get their life back on track. Fabian then went to Inner Coast College to become a drug counselor, and received the highest certification from the state. Debora took this back to homeboy industries and became the director of their drug counseling program and began teaching others the skills he had learned. In 2008, he met Sandra Quintana, the founder of Latino Producers Action Network (LPAN), who recruited him to use his art skills to better the community. LPAN gave him a studio and helped him focus on his career as an artist. With LPAN, Debora started “La Clase” art academy which focuses on art as a method of self expression, rehabilitation, and healing in order to give guidance for at risk youth and others struggling with gang culture, incarceration, and substance abuse. Fabian is now the Executive director at LPAN and a full-time artist.

== Teaching ==
Reflecting on his difficult youthful experience, insufficient motivation in school, and poverty, Debora became a teacher. “Society states that once you do jail time, or pay your debt to society, you’re supposed to be welcomed to the community, but that’s not so true. I believe there are still systems of exclusion and oppression that exist, prohibiting people from reaching their fullest potential,” Debora says.

== Awards and recognition ==
In 2011 Debora was honored by the Belle Foundation for Cultural Development, Grantee, San Jose, Calif. In 2007, Edward James Olmos awarded him a scholarship and featured Debora in a 2007 documentary called Voces de Cambio.
