= Fabián Bonhoff =

Argentine footballer

Personal information
- Full name: Fabián Eduardo Bonhoff Rosas
- Date of birth: 14 August 1963 (age 63)
- Place of birth: Santa Fe, Argentina
- Height: 1.89 m (6 ft 2 in)
- Position: Defender

Senior career*
Years	Team	Apps	(Gls)
1980–1983	Newell's Old Boys		
1987–1988	Huracán	10	(1)
1988–1990	Castellón		
1990–1993	Palamós CF		
- * Club domestic league appearances and goals

Fabián Eduardo Bonhoff Rosas (born 14 August 1963) is an Argentine former professional footballer who played as a defender in somfore clubs in Argentina and Spain.
