= Fabian Oefner =

Swiss artist

Fabian Oefner (born 1984) is a Swiss visual artist. His works have been displayed in various countries around the globe.

Oefner spoke at a TEDx event in 2013. His work "Liquid Jewls" was featured in The Boston Globe, Wired UK and Wired in the US, and along with "Black Hole" in Stern (Germany's biggest weekly news magazine).

He has had exhibits in Zurich, Switzerland, Paris, France, Copenhagen, Denmark, Germany, and Poland. His works are widely recognizable by their color and composition and have been used by Asics shoe brand for promotion in +81 Magazine.
