= Geelong Symphony Orchestra =

The Geelong Symphony Orchestra is a 60-member symphony orchestra based in Geelong, Victoria, Australia. Geelong Symphony Orchestra gave their debut concert on 26 February 2016 and give three concerts annually in Deakin University's Costa Hall.
