= Fabián Montes Sánchez =

Mexican politician (born 1974)

- Born: 5 April 1974 (age 52); Guadalajara, Jalisco, Mexico
- Occupation: Politician
- Political party: PAN

Fabián Fernando Montes Sánchez (born 5 April 1974) is a Mexican politician affiliated with the National Action Party (PAN). In the 2006 general election he was elected to the Chamber of Deputies to represent Jalisco's 9th district during the 60th session of Congress.
