= Fabian Montabell =

German footballer (born 1985)

Personal information
- Date of birth: 13 February 1985 (age 41)
- Place of birth: Hanover, West Germany
- Height: 1.87 m (6 ft 2 in)
- Position: Striker

Youth career
- TuS Wettbergen
- 1999–2003: Hannover 96

Senior career*
Years	Team	Apps	(Gls)
2003–2008	Hannover 96	6	(0)
2008–2010	Rot-Weiß Erfurt	4	(0)
2010–2013	Fortuna Köln	95	(35)
2013–2014	Sportfreunde Lotte	25	(3)
2014–2016	TuS Koblenz	22	(0)
- * Club domestic league appearances and goals

Fabian Montabell (born 13 February 1985) is a German former footballer who played as a striker.

== Career ==
Montabell joined his hometown club Hannover 96 in 1999 as a youth player and worked his way through to the first-team squad for the 2003–04 season. However, he mostly played for the club's amateur/under-23 side in the Oberliga North. He made his Bundesliga debut as a final day substitute against VfL Bochum on 22 May 2004. He played six times in total for the full team over his three seasons whilst included the senior squad.

In 2008, he transferred to FC Rot-Weiß Erfurt before joining Fortuna Köln in 2010. Two years later he moved to Sportfreunde Lotte before signing for TuS Koblenz a year later.

== Personal life ==
He holds both German and French nationalities.
