= Juan Vicente Fabbiani =

Venezuelan painter

Juan Vicente Fabbiani (1910–1989) was a Venezuelan painter.
