= Fabián Sánchez (footballer, born 1988) =

Paraguayan footballer

Personal information
- Full name: Roberto Fabián Sánchez Doldán
- Date of birth: 10 April 1988 (age 38)
- Place of birth: Paraguay
- Height: 1.79 m (5 ft 10 1/2 in)
- Position: Striker

Youth career
- –2007: FC L'Escala

Senior career*
Years	Team	Apps	(Gls)
2007–2008	Atromitos	11	(0)
2008–2009	Hapoel Ramat Gan	12	(2)
2009–2010	Hapoel Rishon LeZion	11	(2)
2010–2011	Ahva Arraba	17	(2)
2012	Once Caldas	2	(0)
- * Club domestic league appearances and goals

Roberto Fabián Sánchez Doldán (born 10 April 1988), commonly known as Fabian Sanchez, is a Paraguayan football striker who currently plays in Colombia for Once Caldas.

== Career ==
Sánchez began playing football in Club Olimpia's youth system, before playing professionally with Paraguayan sides 12 de Octubre, General Caballero, Independiente de Campo Grande and River Plate. He played abroad in Greece, Israel and Colombia, where he signed with Once Caldas and reunited with Ángel Guillermo Hoyos his manager at Atromitos F.C.
