= Fabian Geiser =

Swiss footballer (born 1983)

Personal information
- Date of birth: 4 April 1983 (age 43)
- Place of birth: Langenthal, Switzerland
- Height: 1.75 m (5 ft 9 in)
- Position: Centre back

Youth career
- 1990–1998: Langenthal
- 1998–2000: Young Boys

Senior career*
Years	Team	Apps	(Gls)
2000–2005	Young Boys	40	(0)
2005–2006	Lausanne-Sport	26	(0)
2006–2009	Schaffhausen	58	(0)
2009–2010	Lausanne-Sport	12	(0)
2010–2012	Le Mont	26	(0)
2012–2019	Stade Lausanne Ouchy	144	(7)

International career
- Switzerland U21
- * Club domestic league appearances and goals

Fabian Geiser (born 4 April 1983) is a retired footballer from Switzerland.
