= 2011–12 Division 1 season (Swedish ice hockey) =

- League: (Sweden) Division 1
- Sport: Ice hockey
- Duration: 14 September 2011 – 19 February 2012 (regular season)
- Teams: 56

Division 1 seasons
- 2010–11 2012–13

The 2011–12 season of Division 1, the third tier of ice hockey in Sweden, began on 14 September 2011 and ended on 19 February 2012, with promotion and relegation tournaments continuing until 6 April. 56 teams participated in the league (Luleå Rebels HC had gone bankrupt in October 2011), divided into six geographical groups lettered A through F.

== Format ==
The first half of the regular season started with six groups, with eight teams in groups A and B, and ten teams in the other groups. The teams played three or four matches against the other teams in their group, resulting in a first half of 21, 27 or 28 matches.

After new years, the teams were regrouped according to their first-half performance. The top four teams from each group formed three new groups, called Allettan Norra ("North", from groups A and B), Allettan Mellan ("Central", from groups C and D) and Allettan Södra ("South", from groups E and F). The teams that didn't qualify for Allettan played a continuation series with the remaining teams in their original groups.

At the conclusion of the regular season in February, the lowest-ranked teams from the continuation groups were forced to play qualifiers against the best Division 2 teams to retain their spots in Division 1 for the following season. Meanwhile, the top teams from each of the continuation groups, along with the top four teams from each of the Allettan groups, qualified for a playoff. The four surviving teams at the end of the playoffs participated in the 2012 HockeyAllsvenskan in order to compete for promotion to Sweden's second-tier league HockeyAllsvenskan against that league's two teams with the worst records in 2011–12.

== Participating clubs ==
2011–12 Division 1 clubs, organized by starting group
| Division 1A | Division 1B | Division 1C | Division 1D | Division 1E | Division 1F |
|---|---|---|---|---|---|
| Asplöven HC; Bodens HF; IF Björklöven; Clemensnäs HC; Kalix UHC; Kiruna IF; Piteå HC; Tegs SK; Luleå Rebels HC^{[note]} | Ånge IK; AIK-Hockey Härnösand; Kovlands IshF; Kramfors-Alliansen; Njurunda SK; Örnsköldsvik HF; Östersunds IK; Sollefteå HK | Borlänge HF; Enköpings SK HK; Falu IF; Hedemora SK; Hudiksvalls HC; IFK Ore; Lindlövens IF; Söderhamn/Ljusne HC; Surahammars IF; Tierps HK | Åker/Strängnäs HC; Huddinge IK; IF Vallentuna BK; Järfälla HC; Nacka HK; Nyköpings HK; Nynäshamns IF HC; Värmdö HC; Visby/Roma HK; Wings HC Arlanda | Gislaveds SK; Grästorps IK; HC Vita Hästen; IFK Arboga IK; IFK Kumla IK; Mariestad BoIS HC; Mjölby HC; Skövde IK; Tranås AIF; Vimmerby HC | Halmstad HF; Helsingborgs HC; IK Pantern; Kallinge-Ronneby IF; Karlskrona HK; Kristianstads IK; Kungälvs IK; Mörrums GoIS IK; Nybro Vikings IF; Olofströms IK |

Luleå Rebels HC went bankrupt in mid-October 2011 and ceased to exist. As a result, all games the team had played this season were nullified and removed from the Division 1A standings.

== First half ==
=== Division 1A ===
* Teams 1–4 play the second half of the season in Allettan Norra.
* Remaining teams play Division 1A continuation

| # | Team | GP | W | T | L | GF | GA | GD | TP | OTW | OTL | GWSW | GWSL |
|---|---|---|---|---|---|---|---|---|---|---|---|---|---|
| 1 | IF Björklöven | 21 | 19 | 1 | 1 | 101 | 32 | +69 | 58 | 0 | 1 | 0 | 0 |
| 2 | Asplöven HC | 21 | 13 | 3 | 5 | 88 | 48 | +40 | 44 | 0 | 1 | 2 | 0 |
| 3 | Kiruna IF | 21 | 12 | 3 | 6 | 86 | 51 | +35 | 41 | 2 | 0 | 0 | 1 |
| 4 | Piteå HC | 21 | 6 | 7 | 8 | 64 | 60 | +4 | 28 | 2 | 3 | 1 | 1 |
| 5 | Tegs SK | 21 | 6 | 5 | 10 | 39 | 66 | –27 | 26 | 1 | 1 | 2 | 1 |
| 6 | Bodens HF | 21 | 7 | 1 | 13 | 44 | 79 | –35 | 22 | 0 | 0 | 0 | 1 |
| 7 | Kalix UHC | 21 | 5 | 3 | 13 | 42 | 82 | –40 | 19 | 0 | 1 | 1 | 1 |
| 8 | Clemensnäs HC | 21 | 2 | 5 | 14 | 54 | 100 | –46 | 14 | 2 | 0 | 1 | 2 |

=== Division 1B ===
* Teams 1–4 play the second half of the season in Allettan Norra.
* Remaining teams play Division 1B continuation

| # | Team | GP | W | T | L | GF | GA | GD | TP | OTW | OTL | GWSW | GWSL |
|---|---|---|---|---|---|---|---|---|---|---|---|---|---|
| 1 | Östersunds IK | 28 | 22 | 1 | 5 | 156 | 53 | +103 | 68 | 0 | 0 | 1 | 0 |
| 2 | Örnsköldsvik HF | 28 | 18 | 3 | 7 | 125 | 84 | +41 | 59 | 1 | 0 | 1 | 1 |
| 3 | Sollefteå HK | 28 | 17 | 4 | 7 | 129 | 83 | +46 | 56 | 1 | 0 | 0 | 3 |
| 4 | Kovlands IshF | 28 | 16 | 3 | 9 | 100 | 78 | +22 | 53 | 0 | 1 | 2 | 0 |
| 5 | AIK-Hockey Härnösand | 28 | 8 | 3 | 17 | 105 | 139 | –34 | 30 | 1 | 0 | 2 | 0 |
| 6 | Kramfors-Alliansen | 28 | 7 | 3 | 18 | 97 | 163 | –66 | 25 | 1 | 1 | 0 | 1 |
| 7 | Ånge IK | 28 | 5 | 6 | 17 | 79 | 138 | –59 | 23 | 1 | 3 | 1 | 1 |
| 8 | Njurunda SK | 28 | 7 | 1 | 20 | 85 | 138 | –53 | 22 | 0 | 0 | 0 | 1 |

=== Division 1C ===
* Teams 1–4 play the second half of the season in Allettan Mellan.
* Remaining teams play Division 1C continuation

| # | Team | GP | W | T | L | GF | GA | GD | TP | OTW | OTL | GWSW | GWSL |
|---|---|---|---|---|---|---|---|---|---|---|---|---|---|
| 1 | Hudiksvalls HC | 27 | 18 | 2 | 7 | 123 | 73 | +50 | 58 | 2 | 0 | 0 | 0 |
| 2 | Borlänge HF | 27 | 16 | 4 | 7 | 105 | 71 | +34 | 55 | 1 | 1 | 2 | 0 |
| 3 | Falu IF | 27 | 14 | 6 | 7 | 117 | 86 | +31 | 50 | 0 | 2 | 2 | 2 |
| 4 | Hedemora SK | 27 | 14 | 5 | 8 | 113 | 93 | +20 | 50 | 3 | 1 | 0 | 1 |
| 5 | IFK Ore | 27 | 14 | 4 | 9 | 115 | 82 | +33 | 48 | 1 | 1 | 1 | 1 |
| 6 | Tierps HK | 27 | 11 | 5 | 11 | 97 | 87 | +10 | 41 | 1 | 1 | 2 | 1 |
| 7 | Enköpings SK HK | 27 | 10 | 5 | 12 | 90 | 93 | –3 | 36 | 0 | 2 | 1 | 2 |
| 8 | Lindlövens IF | 27 | 11 | 1 | 15 | 103 | 123 | –20 | 35 | 1 | 0 | 0 | 0 |
| 9 | Surahammars IF | 27 | 6 | 5 | 16 | 77 | 111 | –34 | 25 | 1 | 1 | 1 | 2 |
| 10 | Söderhamn/Ljusne HC | 27 | 2 | 1 | 24 | 54 | 175 | –121 | 7 | 0 | 1 | 0 | 0 |

=== Division 1D ===
* Teams 1–4 play the second half of the season in Allettan Mellan.
* Remaining teams play Division 1D continuation

| # | Team | GP | W | T | L | GF | GA | GD | TP | OTW | OTL | GWSW | GWSL |
|---|---|---|---|---|---|---|---|---|---|---|---|---|---|
| 1 | Åker/Strängnäs HC | 27 | 15 | 6 | 6 | 117 | 83 | +34 | 56 | 3 | 0 | 2 | 1 |
| 2 | Nyköpings HK | 27 | 16 | 5 | 6 | 115 | 89 | +26 | 55 | 0 | 1 | 2 | 2 |
| 3 | Visby/Roma HK | 27 | 16 | 4 | 7 | 91 | 61 | +30 | 53 | 1 | 2 | 0 | 1 |
| 4 | Wings HC Arlanda | 27 | 16 | 4 | 7 | 95 | 83 | +12 | 51 | 1 | 0 | 0 | 1 |
| 5 | Huddinge IK | 27 | 14 | 4 | 9 | 104 | 67 | +37 | 48 | 2 | 0 | 0 | 2 |
| 6 | Nynäshamns IF HC | 27 | 10 | 4 | 13 | 104 | 118 | –14 | 37 | 2 | 1 | 1 | 0 |
| 7 | Värmdö HC | 27 | 7 | 7 | 13 | 99 | 124 | –25 | 33 | 0 | 1 | 5 | 1 |
| 8 | Järfälla HC | 27 | 9 | 3 | 15 | 84 | 106 | –22 | 30 | 0 | 2 | 0 | 1 |
| 9 | Nacka HK | 27 | 6 | 5 | 16 | 81 | 115 | –34 | 25 | 1 | 1 | 1 | 2 |
| 10 | IF Vallentuna BK | 27 | 4 | 4 | 19 | 72 | 116 | –44 | 17 | 1 | 3 | 0 | 0 |

=== Division 1E ===
* Teams 1–4 play the second half of the season in Allettan Södra.
* Remaining teams play Division 1E continuation

| # | Team | GP | W | T | L | GF | GA | GD | TP | OTW | OTL | GWSW | GWSL |
|---|---|---|---|---|---|---|---|---|---|---|---|---|---|
| 1 | HC Vita Hästen | 27 | 23 | 3 | 1 | 142 | 50 | +92 | 73 | 1 | 1 | 0 | 1 |
| 2 | Vimmerby HC | 27 | 15 | 5 | 7 | 117 | 82 | +35 | 54 | 2 | 1 | 2 | 0 |
| 3 | Mariestad BoIS HC | 27 | 14 | 6 | 7 | 103 | 88 | +15 | 51 | 2 | 3 | 1 | 0 |
| 4 | Skövde IK | 27 | 11 | 7 | 9 | 101 | 83 | +18 | 43 | 2 | 3 | 1 | 1 |
| 5 | IFK Arboga IK | 27 | 10 | 7 | 10 | 93 | 98 | –5 | 41 | 3 | 1 | 1 | 2 |
| 6 | Tranås AIF | 27 | 10 | 4 | 13 | 81 | 97 | –16 | 36 | 2 | 2 | 0 | 0 |
| 7 | IFK Kumla IK | 27 | 10 | 3 | 14 | 81 | 101 | –20 | 35 | 1 | 1 | 1 | 0 |
| 8 | Mjölby HC | 27 | 7 | 5 | 15 | 85 | 107 | –22 | 28 | 2 | 2 | 0 | 1 |
| 9 | Grästorps IK | 27 | 5 | 7 | 15 | 69 | 113 | –44 | 25 | 1 | 3 | 2 | 1 |
| 10 | Gislaveds SK | 27 | 4 | 5 | 18 | 71 | 124 | –53 | 19 | 1 | 0 | 1 | 3 |

=== Division 1F ===
* Teams 1–4 play the second half of the season in Allettan Södra.
* Remaining teams play Division 1F continuation

| # | Team | GP | W | T | L | GF | GA | GD | TP | OTW | OTL | GWSW | GWSL |
|---|---|---|---|---|---|---|---|---|---|---|---|---|---|
| 1 | Kristianstads IK | 27 | 21 | 4 | 2 | 90 | 49 | +41 | 70 | 1 | 1 | 2 | 0 |
| 2 | Olofströms IK | 27 | 19 | 2 | 6 | 119 | 74 | +45 | 59 | 0 | 0 | 0 | 2 |
| 3 | Kallinge-Ronneby IF | 27 | 14 | 8 | 5 | 103 | 63 | +40 | 55 | 2 | 1 | 3 | 2 |
| 4 | Karlskrona HK | 27 | 15 | 6 | 6 | 104 | 54 | +50 | 54 | 1 | 1 | 2 | 2 |
| 5 | Nybro Vikings IF | 27 | 8 | 7 | 12 | 77 | 84 | –7 | 34 | 2 | 1 | 1 | 3 |
| 6 | Mörrums GoIS IK | 27 | 9 | 4 | 14 | 67 | 75 | –8 | 34 | 2 | 0 | 1 | 1 |
| 7 | Halmstad HF | 27 | 10 | 3 | 14 | 69 | 91 | –22 | 34 | 0 | 2 | 1 | 0 |
| 8 | IK Pantern | 27 | 9 | 3 | 15 | 79 | 105 | –26 | 31 | 1 | 2 | 0 | 0 |
| 9 | Kungälvs IK | 27 | 5 | 3 | 19 | 53 | 118 | -65 | 19 | 1 | 1 | 0 | 1 |
| 10 | Helsingborgs HC | 27 | 4 | 2 | 21 | 58 | 106 | –48 | 15 | 0 | 1 | 1 | 0 |

== Second half ==
=== Allettan Norra ===
* Teams 1–4 qualify for playoffs
(1) = Starts in round 1 / (2) = Bye to round 2 / (3) = Bye to round 3

| # | Team | GP | W | T | L | GF | GA | GD | TP | OTW | OTL | GWSW | GWSL |
|---|---|---|---|---|---|---|---|---|---|---|---|---|---|
| 1 | (3) Kiruna IF | 14 | 10 | 3 | 1 | 58 | 35 | +23 | 33 | 0 | 0 | 0 | 3 |
| 2 | (2) Asplöven HC | 14 | 8 | 3 | 3 | 70 | 35 | +35 | 29 | 0 | 1 | 2 | 0 |
| 3 | (2) IF Björklöven | 14 | 8 | 3 | 3 | 59 | 30 | +29 | 28 | 0 | 1 | 1 | 1 |
| 4 | (1) Östersunds IK | 14 | 7 | 2 | 5 | 47 | 40 | +7 | 25 | 0 | 0 | 2 | 0 |
| 5 | Piteå HC | 14 | 5 | 4 | 5 | 42 | 34 | +8 | 21 | 2 | 1 | 0 | 1 |
| 6 | Sollefteå HK | 14 | 4 | 2 | 8 | 36 | 63 | –27 | 15 | 1 | 0 | 0 | 1 |
| 7 | Örnsköldsvik HF | 14 | 2 | 2 | 10 | 32 | 68 | –36 | 10 | 1 | 0 | 1 | 0 |
| 8 | Kovlands IshF | 14 | 2 | 1 | 11 | 26 | 65 | –39 | 7 | 0 | 1 | 0 | 0 |

=== Allettan Mellan ===
* Teams 1–4 qualify for playoffs
(1) = Starts in round 1 / (2) = Bye to round 2 / (3) = Bye to round 3

| # | Team | GP | W | T | L | GF | GA | GD | TP | OTW | OTL | GWSW | GWSL |
|---|---|---|---|---|---|---|---|---|---|---|---|---|---|
| 1 | (3) Nyköpings HK | 14 | 10 | 2 | 2 | 61 | 35 | +26 | 33 | 1 | 0 | 0 | 1 |
| 2 | (3) Wings HC Arlanda | 14 | 9 | 3 | 2 | 55 | 36 | +19 | 32 | 0 | 1 | 2 | 0 |
| 3 | (1) Åker/Strängnäs HC | 14 | 8 | 2 | 4 | 61 | 44 | +17 | 28 | 0 | 0 | 2 | 0 |
| 4 | (1) Hudiksvalls HC | 14 | 6 | 4 | 4 | 51 | 39 | +12 | 24 | 1 | 0 | 1 | 2 |
| 5 | Visby/Roma HK | 14 | 6 | 0 | 8 | 45 | 47 | –2 | 18 | 0 | 0 | 0 | 0 |
| 6 | Falu IF | 14 | 3 | 4 | 7 | 40 | 56 | –16 | 14 | 0 | 2 | 1 | 1 |
| 7 | Hedemora SK | 14 | 2 | 4 | 8 | 35 | 65 | –30 | 11 | 0 | 0 | 1 | 3 |
| 8 | Borlänge HF | 14 | 2 | 1 | 11 | 43 | 69 | –26 | 8 | 1 | 0 | 0 | 0 |

=== Allettan Södra ===
* Teams 1–4 qualify for playoffs
(1) = Starts in round 1 / (2) = Bye to round 2 / (3) = Bye to round 3

| # | Team | GP | W | T | L | GF | GA | GD | TP | OTW | OTL | GWSW | GWSL |
|---|---|---|---|---|---|---|---|---|---|---|---|---|---|
| 1 | (3) HC Vita Hästen | 14 | 11 | 2 | 1 | 51 | 24 | +27 | 36 | 1 | 1 | 0 | 0 |
| 2 | (2) Karlskrona HK | 14 | 8 | 3 | 3 | 47 | 35 | +12 | 29 | 1 | 1 | 1 | 0 |
| 3 | (2) Kallinge-Ronneby IF | 14 | 6 | 4 | 4 | 54 | 37 | +17 | 25 | 1 | 1 | 2 | 0 |
| 4 | (1) Olofströms IK | 14 | 6 | 4 | 4 | 53 | 50 | +3 | 23 | 1 | 0 | 0 | 3 |
| 5 | Mariestad BoIS HC | 14 | 5 | 1 | 8 | 43 | 54 | –11 | 16 | 0 | 0 | 0 | 1 |
| 6 | Vimmerby HC | 14 | 4 | 2 | 8 | 48 | 61 | –13 | 14 | 0 | 2 | 0 | 0 |
| 7 | Kristianstads IK | 14 | 3 | 3 | 8 | 33 | 46 | –13 | 14 | 1 | 1 | 1 | 0 |
| 8 | Skövde IK | 14 | 2 | 3 | 9 | 32 | 54 | –22 | 11 | 1 | 0 | 1 | 1 |

=== Division 1A continuation ===
* Team 1 qualifies for the playoffs (round 1)
* Team 4 is forced to play 2012 Division 1 qualifier (group A)

| # | Team | GP | W | T | L | GF | GA | GD | TP | OTW | OTL | GWSW | GWSL |
|---|---|---|---|---|---|---|---|---|---|---|---|---|---|
| 1 | Bodens HF | 12 | 7 | 2 | 3 | 42 | 31 | +11 | 27 | 1 | 0 | 1 | 0 |
| 2 | Tegs SK | 12 | 6 | 2 | 4 | 42 | 30 | +12 | 24 | 0 | 0 | 0 | 2 |
| 3 | Clemensnäs HC | 12 | 6 | 1 | 5 | 53 | 58 | –5 | 20 | 0 | 0 | 1 | 0 |
| 4 | Kalix UHC | 12 | 2 | 1 | 9 | 21 | 39 | –18 | 8 | 0 | 1 | 0 | 0 |

=== Division 1B continuation ===
* Team 1 qualifies for the playoffs (round 1)
* Teams 3 and 4 is forced to play 2012 Division 1 qualifier (group B)

| # | Team | GP | W | T | L | GF | GA | GD | TP | OTW | OTL | GWSW | GWSL |
|---|---|---|---|---|---|---|---|---|---|---|---|---|---|
| 1 | Ånge IK | 12 | 7 | 1 | 4 | 49 | 39 | +10 | 24 | 0 | 0 | 1 | 0 |
| 2 | AIK-Hockey Härnösand | 12 | 5 | 1 | 6 | 42 | 50 | –8 | 21 | 0 | 0 | 1 | 0 |
| 3 | Njurunda SK | 12 | 5 | 2 | 5 | 47 | 43 | +4 | 17 | 0 | 2 | 0 | 0 |
| 4 | Kramfors-Alliansen | 12 | 3 | 4 | 5 | 51 | 57 | –6 | 17 | 2 | 0 | 0 | 2 |

=== Division 1C continuation ===
* Team 1 qualifies for the playoffs (round 1)
* Teams 5 and 6 are forced to play 2012 Division 1 qualifier (group C)

| # | Team | GP | W | T | L | GF | GA | GD | TP | OTW | OTL | GWSW | GWSL |
|---|---|---|---|---|---|---|---|---|---|---|---|---|---|
| 1 | Enköpings SK HK | 15 | 11 | 1 | 3 | 82 | 31 | +51 | 39 | 1 | 0 | 0 | 0 |
| 2 | IFK Ore | 15 | 6 | 3 | 6 | 55 | 63 | –8 | 30 | 0 | 1 | 1 | 1 |
| 3 | Tierps HK | 15 | 7 | 2 | 6 | 55 | 53 | +2 | 29 | 0 | 1 | 0 | 1 |
| 4 | Lindlövens IF | 15 | 6 | 2 | 7 | 59 | 72 | –13 | 23 | 0 | 0 | 1 | 1 |
| 5 | Surahammars IF | 15 | 5 | 4 | 6 | 52 | 42 | +10 | 22 | 1 | 0 | 1 | 2 |
| 6 | Söderhamn/Ljusne HC | 15 | 3 | 2 | 10 | 39 | 81 | –42 | 13 | 0 | 0 | 2 | 0 |

=== Division 1D continuation ===
* Team 1 qualifies for the playoffs (round 1)
* Teams 5 and 6 are forced to play 2012 Division 1 qualifier (group D)

| # | Team | GP | W | T | L | GF | GA | GD | TP | OTW | OTL | GWSW | GWSL |
|---|---|---|---|---|---|---|---|---|---|---|---|---|---|
| 1 | Huddinge IK | 15 | 11 | 2 | 2 | 76 | 35 | +41 | 45 | 2 | 0 | 0 | 0 |
| 2 | Nacka HK | 15 | 9 | 1 | 5 | 64 | 48 | +16 | 29 | 0 | 1 | 0 | 0 |
| 3 | Järfälla HC | 15 | 6 | 5 | 4 | 51 | 53 | –2 | 27 | 1 | 2 | 1 | 1 |
| 4 | IF Vallentuna BK | 15 | 6 | 4 | 5 | 44 | 46 | –2 | 24 | 1 | 1 | 1 | 1 |
| 5 | Värmdö HC | 15 | 5 | 2 | 8 | 58 | 60 | –2 | 22 | 0 | 0 | 1 | 1 |
| 6 | Nynäshamns IF HC | 15 | 1 | 0 | 14 | 31 | 82 | –51 | 9 | 0 | 0 | 0 | 0 |

=== Division 1E continuation ===
* Team 1 qualifies for the playoffs (round 1)
* Teams 5 and 6 are forced to play 2012 Division 1 qualifier (group E)

| # | Team | GP | W | T | L | GF | GA | GD | TP | OTW | OTL | GWSW | GWSL |
|---|---|---|---|---|---|---|---|---|---|---|---|---|---|
| 1 | Tranås AIF | 15 | 9 | 1 | 5 | 64 | 47 | +17 | 35 | 0 | 0 | 1 | 0 |
| 2 | Mjölby HC | 15 | 7 | 5 | 3 | 56 | 39 | +16 | 32 | 2 | 0 | 2 | 1 |
| 3 | IFK Arboga IK | 15 | 7 | 1 | 7 | 58 | 47 | +11 | 31 | 0 | 0 | 1 | 0 |
| 4 | IFK Kumla IK | 15 | 7 | 3 | 5 | 49 | 38 | +11 | 29 | 1 | 0 | 0 | 2 |
| 5 | Grästorps IK | 15 | 8 | 0 | 7 | 42 | 57 | –15 | 25 | 0 | 0 | 0 | 0 |
| 6 | Gislaveds SK | 15 | 0 | 4 | 11 | 38 | 79 | –41 | 4 | 0 | 3 | 0 | 1 |

=== Division 1F continuation ===
* Team 1 qualifies for the playoffs (round 1)
* Teams 5 and 6 are forced to play 2012 Division 1 qualifier (group F)

| # | Team | GP | W | T | L | GF | GA | GD | TP | OTW | OTL | GWSW | GWSL |
|---|---|---|---|---|---|---|---|---|---|---|---|---|---|
| 1 | Nybro Vikings IF | 15 | 10 | 3 | 2 | 45 | 20 | +25 | 43 | 0 | 0 | 2 | 1 |
| 2 | Mörrums GoIS IK | 15 | 9 | 2 | 4 | 39 | 22 | +17 | 37 | 2 | 0 | 0 | 0 |
| 3 | Halmstad HF | 15 | 5 | 4 | 6 | 47 | 48 | –1 | 26 | 2 | 1 | 1 | 0 |
| 4 | Helsingborgs HC | 15 | 4 | 5 | 6 | 29 | 40 | –11 | 18 | 0 | 1 | 1 | 3 |
| 5 | IK Pantern | 15 | 4 | 2 | 9 | 36 | 50 | –14 | 16 | 0 | 1 | 0 | 1 |
| 6 | Kungälvs IK | 15 | 3 | 4 | 8 | 30 | 46 | –16 | 16 | 0 | 1 | 2 | 1 |

== Playoffs ==
=== Round 1 ===
==== IF Björklöven vs Bodens HF (2–0) ====
Game log

| 23 February 2012; 19:00 | Bodens HF | 1 – 4 (0–1, 1–1, 0–2) | IF Björklöven | Björknäshallen, Boden; Attendance: 714 |

Game reference
| 20 min | Penalties | 6 min |
| 18 | Shots | 43 |

| 25 February 2012; 15:00 | IF Björklöven | 4 – 2 (1–0, 3–0, 0–2) | Bodens HF | Umeå Arena, Umeå; Attendance: 2692 |

Game reference
| 22 min | Penalties | 38 min |
| 38 | Shots | 22 |

==== Östersunds IK vs Ånge IK (2–1) ====
Game log

| 23 February 2012; 19:00 | Ånge IK | 3 – 2 (2–0, 0–1, 1–1) | Östersunds IK | Ånge ishall, Ånge; Attendance: 224 |

Game reference
| 10 min | Penalties | 6 min |
| 29 | Shots | 46 |

| 25 February 2012; 15:00 | Östersunds IK | 8 – 1 (3–1, 2–0, 3–0) | Ånge IK | Z-Hallen, Östersund; Attendance: 421 |

Game reference
| 12 min | Penalties | 36 min |
| 45 | Shots | 23 |

| 26 February 2012; 17:00 | Östersunds IK | 13 – 2 (6–0, 2–1, 5–1) | Ånge IK | Näskotthallen, Nälden; Attendance: 303 |

Game reference
| 4 min | Penalties | 8 min |
| 47 | Shots | 20 |

==== Åker/Strängnäs HC vs Enköpings SK HK (1–2) ====
Game log

| 23 February 2012; 19:00 | Enköpings SK HK | 5 – 3 (1–0, 4–2, 0–1) | Åker/Strängnäs HC | Bahcohallen, Enköping; Attendance: 965 |

Game reference
| 8 min | Penalties | 4 min |
| 30 | Shots | 30 |

| 26 February 2012; 16:00 | Åker/Strängnäs HC | 1 – 5 (0–1, 1–3, 0–1) | Enköpings SK HK | Åkers Ishall, Åkers styckebruk Attendance: 801 |

Game reference
| 8 min | Penalties | 12 min |
| 35 | Shots | 21 |

==== Hudiksvalls HC vs Huddinge IK (1–2) ====
Game log

| 23 February 2012; 19:00 | Huddinge IK | 1 – 4 (1–1, 0–2, 0–1) | Hudiksvalls HC | Björkängshallen, Huddinge; Attendance: 725 |

Game reference
| 35 min | Penalties | 10 min |
| 31 | Shots | 28 |

| 25 February 2012; 17:00 | Hudiksvalls HC | 3 – 4 (GWS) (0–2, 2–0, 1–1, 0–0, 0–1) | Huddinge IK | Glysishallen, Hudiksvall; Attendance: 878 |

Game reference
| 10 min | Penalties | 28 min |
| 28 | Shots | 45 |

| 26 February 2012; 16:00 | Hudiksvalls HC | 2 – 3 (0–2, 0–1, 2–0) | Huddinge IK | Glysishallen, Hudiksvall; Attendance: 702 |

Game reference
| 29 min | Penalties | 10 min |
| 49 | Shots | 22 |

==== Kallinge-Ronneby IF vs Tranås AIF (2–0) ====
Game log

| 23 February 2012; 19:00 | Tranås AIF | 1 – 4 (0–1, 0–0, 1–3) | Kallinge-Ronneby IF | Bredstorpshallen, Tranås; Attendance: 858 |

Game reference
| 14 min | Penalties | 10 min |
| 38 | Shots | 32 |

| 25 February 2012; 15:00 | Kallinge-Ronneby IF | 8 – 2 (3–0, 3–0, 2–2) | Tranås AIF | Kockumhallen, Ronneby; Attendance: 1546 |

Game reference
| 26 min | Penalties | 37 min |
| 34 | Shots | 40 |

==== Olofströms IK vs Nybro Vikings IF (2–0) ====
Game log

| 23 February 2012; 19:00 | Nybro Vikings IF | 3 – 5 (2–1, 1–3, 0–1) | Olofströms IK | Liljas Arena, Nybro; Attendance: 1728 |

Game reference
| 10 min | Penalties | 14 min |
| 30 | Shots | 39 |

| 25 February 2012; 15:00 | Olofströms IK | 6 – 2 (1–0, 0–1, 5–1) | Nybro Vikings IF | Stålhallen, Olofström; Attendance: 1450 |

Game reference
| 14 min | Penalties | 12 min |
| 32 | Shots | 24 |

=== Round 2 ===
IF Björklöven vs Olofströms IK (1–2)

Kallinge-Ronneby IF vs Enköpings SK HK (2–0)

Asplöven HC vs Huddinge IK (2–1)

Karlskrona HK vs Östersunds IK (2–1)

=== Round 3 ===
Kiruna IF vs Asplöven HC (1–2)

Nyköpings HK vs Kallinge-Ronneby IF (1–2)

HC Vita Hästen vs Karlskrona HK (1–2)

Wings HC Arlanda vs Olofströms IK (0–2)

== 2012 HockeyAllsvenskan qualifier ==
Key
* Play in the 2012–13 HockeyAllsvenskan.
* Play in 2012–13 Division 1.
| ▲ Team was promoted | ▼ Team was relegated |

| # | Team | GP | W | T | L | GF | GA | GD | TP | OTW | OTL | GWSW | GWSL |
|---|---|---|---|---|---|---|---|---|---|---|---|---|---|
| 1 | ▲ Karlskrona HK | 10 | 8 | 0 | 2 | 39 | 23 | +16 | 24 | 0 | 0 | 0 | 0 |
| 2 | ▼ Borås HC* | 10 | 5 | 2 | 3 | 29 | 27 | +2 | 18 | 0 | 0 | 1 | 1 |
| 3 | ▲ Asplöven HC* | 10 | 5 | 1 | 4 | 27 | 23 | +4 | 16 | 0 | 0 | 0 | 1 |
| 4 | Olofströms IK | 10 | 4 | 2 | 4 | 35 | 29 | +6 | 15 | 1 | 0 | 0 | 1 |
| 5 | ▼IF Sundsvall Hockey | 10 | 4 | 1 | 5 | 22 | 33 | –11 | 14 | 0 | 0 | 1 | 0 |
| 6 | Kallinge-Ronneby IF | 10 | 0 | 2 | 8 | 22 | 39 | –17 | 3 | 0 | 1 | 1 | 0 |

*Borås HC initially qualified for HockeyAllsvenskan, but was relegated to Division 1 due to no elite license. They were replaced by the third-placed team Asplöven HC for the following season.

== 2012 Division 1 qualifiers ==
Key
* Teams play in the 2012–13 Division 1 season.
* Teams play in Division 2 for the 2012–13 season.
| ▲ Team was promoted | ▼ Team was relegated |

=== Group A ===
| # | Team | GP | W | T | L | GF | GA | GD | TP | OTW | OTL | GWSW | GWSL |
|---|---|---|---|---|---|---|---|---|---|---|---|---|---|
| 1 | Kalix UHC | 2 | 2 | 0 | 0 | 13 | 3 | +10 | 6 | 0 | 0 | 0 | 0 |
| 2 | Vännäs HC | 2 | 0 | 0 | 2 | 3 | 13 | –10 | 0 | 0 | 0 | 0 | 0 |

=== Group B ===
| # | Team | GP | W | T | L | GF | GA | GD | TP | OTW | OTL | GWSW | GWSL |
|---|---|---|---|---|---|---|---|---|---|---|---|---|---|
| 1 | ▲ Brunflo IK | 6 | 4 | 1 | 1 | 24 | 12 | +12 | 13 | 0 | 0 | 0 | 1 |
| 2 | Kramfors-Alliansen | 6 | 2 | 2 | 2 | 19 | 14 | +5 | 10 | 0 | 0 | 2 | 0 |
| 3 | ▼ Njurunda SK | 6 | 3 | 0 | 3 | 22 | 20 | +2 | 9 | 0 | 0 | 0 | 0 |
| 4 | Husum HK | 6 | 1 | 1 | 4 | 15 | 34 | –19 | 4 | 0 | 0 | 0 | 1 |

=== Group C ===
| # | Team | GP | W | T | L | GF | GA | GD | TP | OTW | OTL | GWSW | GWSL |
|---|---|---|---|---|---|---|---|---|---|---|---|---|---|
| 1 | ▲ Valbo HC | 8 | 6 | 1 | 1 | 25 | 16 | +9 | 19 | 0 | 1 | 0 | 0 |
| 2 | Surahammars IF | 8 | 6 | 0 | 2 | 45 | 28 | +17 | 18 | 0 | 0 | 0 | 0 |
| 3 | IK Sätra | 8 | 3 | 1 | 4 | 32 | 31 | +1 | 10 | 0 | 0 | 0 | 1 |
| 4 | ▼ Söderhamn/Ljusne HC | 8 | 1 | 3 | 4 | 32 | 41 | –9 | 9 | 1 | 0 | 2 | 0 |
| 5 | Bålsta HC | 8 | 1 | 1 | 6 | 20 | 38 | –18 | 4 | 0 | 0 | 0 | 1 |

=== Group D ===
| # | Team | GP | W | T | L | GF | GA | GD | TP | OTW | OTL | GWSW | GWSL |
|---|---|---|---|---|---|---|---|---|---|---|---|---|---|
| 1 | ▲ Botkyrka HC | 6 | 5 | 1 | 0 | 22 | 12 | +10 | 16 | 0 | 1 | 0 | 0 |
| 2 | ▲ Väsby IK HK | 6 | 3 | 2 | 1 | 24 | 21 | +3 | 12 | 1 | 1 | 0 | 0 |
| 3 | Bajen Fans IF | 6 | 1 | 2 | 3 | 16 | 19 | –3 | 6 | 1 | 0 | 0 | 1 |
| 4 | ▼ Värmdö HC | 6 | 0 | 1 | 5 | 15 | 25 | –10 | 2 | 0 | 0 | 1 | 0 |

=== Group E ===
| # | Team | GP | W | T | L | GF | GA | GD | TP | OTW | OTL | GWSW | GWSL |
|---|---|---|---|---|---|---|---|---|---|---|---|---|---|
| 1 | Grästorps IK | 8 | 6 | 1 | 1 | 36 | 13 | +23 | 20 | 1 | 0 | 0 | 0 |
| 2 | ▲ Västerviks IK | 8 | 6 | 0 | 2 | 31 | 23 | +8 | 18 | 0 | 0 | 0 | 0 |
| 3 | Grums IK | 8 | 3 | 1 | 4 | 28 | 24 | +4 | 10 | 0 | 1 | 0 | 0 |
| 4 | ▼ Gislaveds SK | 8 | 3 | 0 | 5 | 18 | 32 | –14 | 9 | 0 | 0 | 0 | 0 |
| 5 | Hammarö HC | 8 | 1 | 0 | 7 | 20 | 41 | –21 | 3 | 0 | 0 | 0 | 0 |

=== Group F ===
| # | Team | GP | W | T | L | GF | GA | GD | TP | OTW | OTL | GWSW | GWSL |
|---|---|---|---|---|---|---|---|---|---|---|---|---|---|
| 1 | Kungälvs IK | 8 | 6 | 1 | 1 | 34 | 20 | +14 | 20 | 0 | 0 | 1 | 0 |
| 2 | IK Pantern | 8 | 5 | 1 | 2 | 31 | 20 | +11 | 16 | 0 | 0 | 0 | 1 |
| 3 | Nittorps IK | 8 | 4 | 0 | 4 | 20 | 31 | –11 | 12 | 0 | 0 | 0 | 0 |
| 4 | Tyringe SoSS | 8 | 3 | 0 | 5 | 21 | 22 | –1 | 9 | 0 | 0 | 0 | 0 |
| 5 | Varberg Vipers | 8 | 1 | 0 | 7 | 16 | 29 | –13 | 3 | 0 | 0 | 0 | 0 |
