= 2010–11 Division 1 season (Swedish ice hockey) =

- League: Division 1
- Sport: Ice hockey
- Number of teams: 57
- Promoted to Division 1: none
- Relegated to Division 2: Kramfors-Alliansen; Valbo HC; Botkyrka HC; Väsby IK; Västerviks IK; Gislaveds SK

Division 1 seasons
- ← 2009–10 2011–12 →

2010–11 was the 12th season that Division 1 functioned as the third-level of ice hockey in Sweden, below the second-level HockeyAllsvenskan and the top-level Elitserien (now the SHL).

== Format ==
The 57 participating teams played the first half of the season in six groups divided geographically. The successful teams then moved into three new groups (the Allettan groups), while the remaining teams played in a continuation of their smaller existing groups. The teams with the worst records in these continuation groups were then forced to defend their places in Division 1 against challengers from Division 2 (see "relegation tournament" below) in a round-robin tournament called Kvalserien till Division 1. Meanwhile, the successful teams from the Allettan groups along with the group winners of the continuation groups played a playoff to determine who would have a chance to compete for promotion to the second-tier league HockeyAllsvenskan in Kvalserien till HockeyAllsvenskan.

== First round ==
=== Division 1A ===
	Club	GP	W	OTW	SOW	SOL	OTL	L	GF	GA	Pts
1.	IF Björklöven	24	20	0	1	0	2	1	111	44	64
2.	Asplöven HC	24	15	2	0	2	1	4	117	66	52
3.	Kiruna IF	24	15	0	1	1	0	7	113	70	48
4.	Piteå HC	24	15	0	1	0	0	8	109	69	47
5.	Tegs SK	24	14	1	0	0	1	8	101	77	45
6.	Bodens HF	24	5	2	0	0	1	16	62	110	20
7.	Kalix HC	24	5	0	1	1	0	17	57	115	18
8.	Luleå Rebels HC	24	4	1	1	1	0	17	59	111	17
9.	Clemensnäs HC	24	3	0	1	1	1	18	62	129	13

=== Division 1B ===
	Club	Pts
1.	Hudiksvalls HC	69
2.	Östersund/Brunflo IF	57
3.	Sollefteå HK	50
4.	Kovlands IF	48
5.	Örnsköldsviks HF	39
6.	Njurunda SK	32
7.	AIK Härnösand	29
8.	Kramfors-Alliansen	12

=== Division 1C ===
	Club	GP	W	OTW	SOW	SOL	OTL	L	GF	GA	Pts
1.	Enköpings SK	27	17	1	1	2	3	3	126	65	60
2.	Surahammars IF	27	18	1	1	1	1	5	117	73	60
3.	IFK Arboga	27	16	6	0	0	0	5	113	89	60
4.	IFK Ore	27	12	3	2	1	2	7	119	100	49
5.	Borlänge HF	27	13	1	1	1	1	9	105	91	47
6.	Tierps HK	27	10	1	1	0	1	14	95	114	35
7.	Hedemora SK	27	10	0	2	2	2	13	91	115	34
8.	Lindlövens IF	27	7	0	1	1	1	17	92	131	25
9.	Valbo HC	27	5	1	1	2	1	18	76	117	20
10.	Falu IF	27	3	0	2	0	2	20	75	114	15

=== Division 1D ===
	Club	GP	W	OTW	SOW	SOL	OTL	L	GF	GA	Pts
1.	Huddinge IK	27	19	2	0	0	1	5	126	60	62
2.	Nyköpings HK	27	18	0	0	0	0	9	125	84	54
3.	Visby-Roma HK	27	15	2	1	1	0	8	99	80	52
4.	Nacka HK	27	15	0	1	1	1	9	115	105	49
5.	Wings HC Arlanda	27	12	3	2	1	1	8	85	77	48
6.	Järfälla HC	27	10	0	2	1	0	14	97	118	35
7.	Botkyrka HC	27	9	1	0	1	1	15	96	111	31
8.	Väsby IK	27	8	0	1	1	1	16	81	108	28
9.	Nynäshamns IF	27	6	0	2	2	1	16	87	125	25
10.	Vallentuna BK	27	6	0	0	1	2	18	88	131	21

=== Division 1E ===
	Club	GP	W	OTW	SOW	SOL	OTL	L	GF	GA	Pts
1.	HC Vita Hästen	27	20	2	2	0	0	3	148	72	68
2.	Skövde IK	27	17	0	0	1	3	6	111	67	55
3.	Mariestads BoIS	27	16	0	1	3	0	7	96	71	53
4.	IFK Kumla	27	12	4	1	1	0	9	100	73	47
5.	Grästorps IK	27	9	3	2	0	1	12	78	83	38
6.	Mjölby HC	27	9	1	0	2	4	11	89	99	35
7.	Tranås AIF	27	10	1	0	1	2	13	88	98	35
8.	Sunne IK	27	10	0	1	1	1	14	98	117	34
9.	Skåre BK	27	8	1	1	0	1	16	77	111	29
10.	IFK Munkfors	27	1	2	1	0	2	21	49	143	11

=== Division 1F ===
	Club	GP	W	OTW	SOW	SOL	OTL	L	GF	GA	Pts
1.	Kristianstads IK	27	21	0	2	0	0	4	111	65	67
2.	Nybro IF	27	16	3	1	0	0	7	88	53	56
3.	Karlskrona HK	27	17	0	0	1	2	7	98	61	54
4.	Olofströms IK	27	15	0	0	0	1	11	92	79	46
5.	Kungälvs IK	27	14	0	0	0	0	13	86	79	42
6.	Mörrums GoIS	27	12	0	0	2	1	12	86	95	39
7.	IK Pantern	27	10	0	0	2	0	15	66	81	32
8.	Halmstad HF	27	8	1	1	1	0	16	69	98	29
9.	Gislaveds SK	27	6	1	3	0	1	16	69	91	27
10.	Västerviks IK	27	4	0	0	1	0	22	55	118	13

== AllEttan ==
=== Northern Group (A/B) ===
	Club	GP	W	OTW	SOW	SOL	OTL	L	GF	GA	Pts
1.	Asplöven HC	14	11	1	0	0	0	2	80	37	35
2.	IF Björklöven	14	11	0	0	0	0	3	47	23	33
3.	Kiruna IF	14	10	0	0	1	1	2	59	50	32
4.	Hudiksvalls HC	14	7	0	1	1	0	5	53	37	24
5.	Piteå HC	14	4	0	1	0	1	8	41	46	15
6.	Sollefteå HK	14	3	1	1	0	1	8	34	54	14
7.	Östersund/Brunflo IF	14	3	0	0	0	0	11	33	62	9
8.	Kovlands IF	14	1	1	0	1	0	11	35	73	6

=== Central Group (C/D) ===
	Club	GP	W	OTW	SOW	SOL	OTL	L	GF	GA	Pts
1.	Huddinge IK	14	12	0	0	0	0	2	59	18	36
2.	Visby-Roma HK	14	11	1	0	0	0	2	48	32	35
3.	Enköpings SK	14	9	1	0	0	0	4	55	30	29
4.	IFK Ore	14	5	1	0	0	1	7	47	54	18
5.	Surahammars IF	14	6	0	0	0	0	8	37	53	18
6.	Nacka HK	14	4	0	0	0	1	9	33	50	13
7.	IFK Arboga	14	3	0	0	0	1	10	41	65	10
8.	Nyköpings HK	14	3	0	0	0	0	11	33	51	9

=== Southern Group (E/F) ===
	Club	GP	W	OTW	SOW	SOL	OTL	L	GF	GA	Pts
1.	HC Vita Hästen	14	10	2	0	1	0	1	51	20	35
2.	Kristianstads IK	14	5	2	3	1	0	3	47	37	26
3.	Nybro IK	14	6	0	2	2	1	3	43	35	25
4.	Karlskrona HK	14	5	0	3	2	0	4	40	36	23
5.	Skövde IK	14	5	0	1	1	1	6	48	50	19
6.	Olofströms IK	14	4	0	1	2	2	5	45	46	18
7.	Mariestads BoIS	14	1	2	2	1	0	8	29	44	12
8.	IFK Kumla	14	2	0	0	2	2	8	28	63	10

== Qualification round ==
=== Division 1A ===
	Club	GP	W	OTW	SOW	SOL	OTL	L	GF	GA	Pts (Bonus)
1.	Tegs SK	12	5	1	1	0	0	5	45	43	25(6)
2.	Clemensnäs HC	12	6	0	2	0	1	3	45	38	23(0)
3.	Bodens HF	12	5	0	0	2	0	5	48	43	21(4)
4.	Luleå Rebels HC	12	5	0	0	1	0	6	47	51	17(1)
5.	Kalix HC	12	5	0	0	0	0	7	39	49	17(2)

=== Division 1B ===
	Club	GP	W	OTW	SOW	SOL	OTL	L	GF	GA	Pts (Bonus)
1.	Örnsköldsviks HF	9	8	0	0	0	0	1	48	17	28(4)
2.	Njurunda SK	9	6	1	0	0	0	2	41	25	22(2)
3.	AIK Härnösand	9	2	0	0	0	0	7	28	50	7(1)
4.	Kramfors-Alliansen	9	1	0	0	0	1	7	21	46	4(0)

=== Division 1C ===
	Club	GP	W	OTW	SOW	SOL	OTL	L	GF	GA	Pts (Bonus)
1.	Borlänge HF	10	6	1	0	0	0	3	42	27	28(8)
2.	Tierps HK	10	6	0	0	0	2	2	38	40	26(6)
3.	Lindlövens IF	10	3	2	2	0	0	3	33	34	19(2)
4.	Hedemora SK	10	4	0	0	1	0	5	34	37	17(4)
5.	Falu IF	10	5	0	0	1	0	4	35	28	16(0)
6.	Valbo HC	10	1	0	0	0	1	8	18	34	5(1)

=== Division 1D ===
	Club	GP	W	OTW	SOW	SOL	OTL	L	GF	GA	Pts (Bonus)
1.	Wings HC Arlanda	10	9	0	0	0	1	0	52	23	36(8)
2.	Järfälla HC	10	4	0	0	0	1	5	31	37	19(6)
3.	Vallentuna BK	10	5	1	0	0	1	3	41	28	18(0)
4.	Nynäshamns IF	10	4	2	0	0	0	4	39	36	17(1)
5.	Botkyrka HC	10	4	0	0	0	0	6	27	39	16(4)
6.	Väsby IK	10	1	0	0	0	0	9	21	48	5(2)

=== Division 1E ===
	Club	GP	W	OTW	SOW	SOL	OTL	L	GF	GA	Pts (Bonus)
1.	Tranås AIF	10	7	1	0	0	0	2	59	28	27(4)
2.	Skåre BK	10	7	0	0	0	1	2	47	34	23(1)
3.	Grästorps IK	10	5	0	0	0	0	5	38	36	23(8)
4.	Mjölby HC	10	4	1	0	0	1	4	46	28	21(6)
5.	Sunne IK	10	4	1	0	0	1	4	58	35	17(2)
6.	IFK Munkfors	10	0	0	0	0	0	10	26	113	0(0)

=== Division 1F ===
	Club	GP	W	OTW	SOW	SOL	OTL	L	GF	GA	Pts (Bonus)
1.	Halmstad HF	10	7	0	0	0	1	2	39	23	24(2)
2.	Kungälvs IK	10	5	0	0	1	0	4	33	32	24(8)
3.	Mörrums GoIS	10	4	0	1	0	1	4	34	34	21(6)
4.	IK Pantern	10	4	0	0	0	0	6	25	35	16(4)
5.	Västerviks IK	10	4	1	0	0	0	5	28	28	14(0)
6.	Gislaveds SK	10	3	1	0	0	0	6	28	35	12(1)

== Playoffs ==
=== Second round ===
- Tegs SK - Hudiksvalls HC 1:2 (1:3, 2:0, 3:4)
- Örnsköldsviks HF - Kiruna IF 0:2 (3:6, 0:6)
- Borlänge HF - IFK Ore 1:2 (2:1, 4:5, 2:6)
- Wings HC Arlanda - Enköpings SK 0:2 (1:3, 2:3)
- Tranås AIF - Karlskrona HK 0:2 (4:6, 2:3 OT)
- Halmstad HC - Nybro IK 0:2 (2:3 OT, 3:6)

=== Second round ===
- IFK Ore - Kiruna IF 0:2 (0:4, 3:10)
- Hudiksvalls HC - Enköpings SK 0:2 (1:2, 0:3)
- Nybro IK - IF Björklöven 1:2 (4:2, 0:1, 1:3)
- Karlskrona HK - Kristianstads IK 2:0 (3:2 OT, 1:0)

=== Final ===
- IF Björklöven - Asplöven HC 0:2 (1:2 OT, 2:4)
- Kiruna IF - Huddinge IK 0:2 (0:5, 2:6)
- Enköpings SK - HC Vita Hästen 0:2 (0:3, 1:2)
- Karlskrona HK - Visby-Roma HK 2:0 (4:0, 2:1)

== Relegation ==
=== Division 1A ===
	Club	GP	W	OTW	SOW	SOL	OTL	L	GF	GA	Pts
1.	Kalix HC	4	3	0	0	1	0	0	26	12	10
2.	Luleå Rebels HC	4	1	0	2	0	0	1	14	17	7
3.	Vännäs HC	4	0	0	0	1	0	3	14	25	1

=== Division 1B ===
	Club	GP	W	OTW	SOW	SOL	OTL	L	GF	GA	Pts
1.	AIK Härnösand	6	5	0	0	0	0	1	25	13	15
2.	Ånge IK	6	3	0	1	0	0	2	33	24	11
3.	Kramfors-Alliansen	6	3	0	0	1	0	2	28	19	10
4.	Östersund/Brunflo IF	6	0	0	0	0	0	6	9	39	0

=== Division 1C ===
	Club	GP	W	OTW	SOW	SOL	OTL	L	GF	GA	Pts
1.	Falu IF	8	6	0	0	0	0	2	30	21	18
2.	Söderhamn/Ljusne	8	4	0	0	0	0	4	29	32	12
3.	Skedvi/Säter IF	8	4	0	0	0	0	4	24	30	12
4.	Lidingö HC	8	3	0	0	0	0	5	33	32	9
5.	Valbo HC	8	3	0	0	0	0	5	21	22	9

=== Division 1D ===
	Club	GP	W	OTW	SOW	SOL	OTL	L	GF	GA	Pts
1.	Värmdö HC	8	4	0	2	0	1	1	28	14	17
2.	Åkers IF	8	5	0	0	1	0	2	27	26	16
3.	Botkyrka HC	8	3	1	0	1	0	3	27	24	12
4.	Haninge HF	8	3	0	0	0	0	5	28	32	9
5.	Väsby IK	8	1	1	0	0	1	5	23	37	6

=== Division 1E ===
	Club	GP	W	OTW	SOW	SOL	OTL	L	GF	GA	Pts
1.	Vimmerby HC	6	4	0	1	0	0	1	31	7	14
2.	Sunne IK	6	4	1	0	0	0	1	25	12	14
3.	Grums IK	6	2	0	0	1	1	2	20	24	8
4.	Karlskoga HC	6	0	0	0	0	0	6	10	43	0

=== Division 1F ===
	Club	GP	W	OTW	SOW	SOL	OTL	L	GF	GA	Pts
1.	Helsingborgs HC	8	4	2	0	1	0	1	26	19	17
2.	Kallinge-Ronneby	8	4	0	0	0	1	3	28	23	13
3.	Gislaveds SK	8	4	0	0	0	1	3	23	21	13
4.	Västerviks IK	8	2	1	1	0	1	3	22	31	11
5.	Boro/Vetlanda HC	8	2	0	0	0	0	6	30	35	6
