= 2002–03 Allsvenskan (ice hockey) season =

Swedish ice hockey season

The 2002–03 Allsvenskan season was the fourth season of the Allsvenskan, the second level of ice hockey in Sweden. 24 teams participated in the league, and Hammarby IF, Rögle BK, AIK, and Skellefteå AIK qualified for the Elitserien qualifier (Swedish: Kvalserien), with Hammarby finishing in first place in SuperAllsvenskan.

== Regular season ==
=== Northern Group ===
	Club	GP	W	OTW	OTL	L	GF	GA	Pts
1.	Hammarby IF	28	21	2	1	4	102	50	68
2.	Skellefteå AIK	28	19	2	3	4	144	55	64
3.	IF Björklöven	28	19	3	1	5	117	60	64
4.	AIK	28	16	1	5	6	95	62	55
5.	IF Sundsvall Hockey	28	15	2	3	8	106	75	52
6.	Nyköpings Hockey 90	28	14	3	3	8	115	88	51
7.	Huddinge IK	28	9	5	2	12	91	108	39
8.	Piteå HC	28	9	3	2	14	89	110	35
9.	Bodens IK	28	10	1	1	16	70	84	33
10.	Örnsköldsviks SK	28	7	1	2	18	74	137	25
11.	Vallentuna BK	28	3	2	1	22	61	123	14
12.	Kiruna IF	28	1	0	1	26	64	176	4

=== Southern Group ===
	Club	GP	W	OTW	OTL	L	GF	GA	Pts
1.	Rögle BK	28	18	3	3	4	127	89	63
2.	Mora IK	28	15	6	3	4	91	65	60
3.	Bofors IK	28	15	3	4	6	107	75	55
4.	IK Oskarshamn	28	15	1	5	7	83	62	52
5.	Mörrums GoIS IK	28	12	1	4	11	104	114	42
6.	IF Troja-Ljungby	28	10	4	3	11	80	84	41
7.	Västerås IK	28	9	6	0	13	99	97	39
8.	Nybro IF	28	9	3	2	14	93	94	35
9.	IFK Arboga IK	28	7	3	3	15	81	95	30
10.	Halmstad Hammers HC	28	4	6	6	12	78	98	30
11.	HC Örebro 90	28	9	0	2	17	71	96	29
12.	Tranås AIF	28	7	2	3	16	82	127	28

== SuperAllsvenskan ==
	Club	GP	W	OTW	OTL	L	GF	GA	Pts
1.	Hammarby IF	14	8	2	1	3	50	38	29
2.	Rögle BK	14	8	1	2	3	46	34	28
3.	Bofors IK	14	6	3	1	4	40	36	25
4.	Skellefteå AIK	14	7	0	3	4	51	32	24
5.	IF Björklöven	14	6	1	1	6	50	47	21
6.	AIK	14	4	2	1	7	34	41	17
7.	Mora IK	14	3	2	1	8	41	59	14
8.	IK Oskarshamn	14	3	0	1	10	32	57	10

== Qualification round ==
=== Northern Group ===
	Club	GP	W	OTW	OTL	L	GF	GA	Pts
1.	IF Sundsvall Hockey	14	11	0	0	3	60	27	33
2.	Huddinge IK	14	10	1	1	2	53	29	33
3.	Piteå HC	14	10	0	0	4	58	31	30
4.	Nyköpings Hockey 90	14	8	1	2	3	60	38	28
5.	Bodens IK	14	7	0	0	7	37	48	21
6.	Vallentuna BK	14	5	1	0	8	39	60	17
7.	Örnsköldsviks SK	14	1	0	1	12	33	68	4
8.	Kiruna IF	14	0	1	0	13	26	65	2

=== Gruppe Süd ===
	Club	GP	W	OTW	OTL	L	GF	GA	Pts
1.	IFK Arboga IK	14	8	1	2	3	36	26	28
2.	Mörrums GoIS IK	14	6	3	1	4	52	37	25
3.	Nybro IF	14	6	2	2	4	39	37	24
4.	Västerås IK	14	6	1	3	4	45	36	23
5.	HC Örebro 90	14	3	5	0	6	33	40	19
6.	Halmstad Hammers HC	14	5	1	2	6	36	44	19
7.	Tranås AIF	14	4	2	2	6	39	42	18
8.	IF Troja-Ljungby	14	2	1	4	7	28	46	12

== Playoffs ==
=== First round ===
- IF Sundsvall Hockey - AIK 0:2 (1:2, 1:2)
- Mörrums GoIS IK - IF Björklöven 0:2 (2:3, 3:5)
- IFK Arboga IK - Bofors IK 2:0 (3:2 OT, 5:2)
- Huddinge IK - Skellefteå AIK 0:2 (1:4, 1:4)

=== Second round ===
- AIK - IF Björklöven 2:0 (4:2, 3:2)
- IFK Arboga IK - Skellefteå AIK 1:2 (3:2, 2:10, 2:4)

== Relegation round ==
=== Northern Group ===
	Club	GP	W	OTW	OTL	L	GF	GA	Pts
1.	Almtuna IS	8	5	1	0	2	37	18	17
2.	Tegs SK	8	4	1	1	2	35	26	15
3.	Örnsköldsviks SK	8	4	1	0	3	34	24	14
4.	Botkyrka HC	8	3	0	2	3	30	26	11
5.	Asplöven HC	8	1	0	0	7	21	63	3

Kiruna IF did not participate to the relegation round due to financial problems, and were relegated to the Swedish Division 1.

=== Southern Group ===
	Club	GP	W	OTW	OTL	L	GF	GA	Pts
1.	Växjö Lakers	10	10	0	0	0	54	21	30
2.	IF Troja-Ljungby	10	8	0	0	2	33	16	24
3.	Tranås AIF	10	4	1	1	4	48	40	15
4.	Sunne IK	10	4	0	1	5	37	32	13
5.	Mariestad BoIS HC	10	1	1	0	8	31	52	5
6.	Grums IK	10	1	0	0	9	27	69	3
