= J18 Region =

Swedish ice hockey league

The J18 Region, formerly called J18 Elit until 2020, is the highest level of under-18 ice hockey in Sweden. The league was first played in the 1980 season. Färjestad BK has won the most league titles, with seven. At Christmas, the five best teams from each division qualify for the J18 Nationell to determine the Swedish U18 Championship.

The league is divided into four divisions, Norra (North), Södra (South), Västra (West), and Östra (East). These divisions are played from September to December during the year. The five best teams from each division qualify for the Winter series known as J18 Allsvenskan, divided into Norra and Södra, while the remaining teams have to play in a continuation series during Winter for their specific division. These "Winter" series are played between January and March of the following year.

== Current teams ==
=== Norra ===
- Bodens HF
- Clemensnäs HC
- IF Björklöven
- IF Sundsvall Hockey
- Luleå HF
- MoDo Hockey
- Örnsköldsvik Hockey
- Östersunds IK
- Skellefteå AIK
- Sunderby SK
- Timrå IK
- Vännäs HC

=== Södra ===
- Borås HC
- Frölunda HC
- HC Vita Hästen
- HV71
- IF Troja-Ljungby
- IK Oskarshamn
- Karlskrona HK
- Linköping HC
- Malmö Redhawks
- Rögle BK
- Tingsryds AIF
- Växjö Lakers

=== Västra ===
- BIK Karlskoga
- Borlänge HF
- Brynäs IF
- Färjestad BK
- Grums IK Hockey
- Hudiksvalls HC
- Leksands IF
- Mora IK
- Örebro HK
- Strömsbro IF
- Valbo HC
- Västerås IK

=== Östra ===
- AIK
- Almtuna IS
- Djurgårdens IF
- Flemingsbergs IK
- Huddinge IK
- IFK Täby HC
- Lidingö Vikings
- Nacka HK
- SDE HF
- Södertälje SK
- Sollentuna HC
- Tyresö/Hanviken
