= Kristianstads IK =

- Nickname: Wild Kings
- City: Kristianstad, Sweden
- League: HockeyTvåan
- Founded: 1966
- Home arena: Kristianstads ishall
- Colors: Dark green, white, orange
- Head coach: Mikael Gath
- Website: kristianstadik.se

Kristianstads IK, or simply Kristianstad, (pronounced [krɪˈɧǎnːsta, -ɑːd]) is a Swedish ice hockey club based in Kristianstad. It plays in HockeyTvåan, the fourth tier, having been relegated to that level for the first time in history in 2024.

The team is nicknamed the "Wild Kings". In 2018–19 it had an average attendance of 1017, the fifth highest of the 47 teams in HockeyEttan, and the second highest for a sports team based in Kristianstad, after IFK Kristianstad.

== History ==
The first hockey team in Kristianstad was the hockey section of association football club Åsums BK. The team originally played rink bandy from 1954 and started playing hockey in 1959. Its first game was against Tyringe SoSS that year. It played its home matches in an outdoor venue in Norra Åsum. In 1962, it defeated the Danish national team by 7–3 in Copenhagen as part of the opponent's preparations for that year's World Championship. The team was dissolved in 1966 due to lack of funds from the main club and decreasing commitment from key people.

Kristianstads IK was founded on July 22 of the same year. It played at an outdoor venue until 1969, when it moved into the newly completed Kristianstads ishall. Current Columbus Blue Jackets head coach John Tortorella played for Kristianstad in the 1981–82 season. In 1996–97 Kristianstad played in the qualification (Kvalserien) to the second tier for the first time. It failed to achieve promotion after losing the decisive game away against Rögle BK. In 2000, due to financial troubles, it became the first sports club in Sweden to undergo debt restructuring. The club was relegated to the fourth level in 2003 but promoted back to the third level two years later. In 2006–07, Kristianstad reached the decisive playoffs for qualification to Kvalserien for HockeyAllsvenskan, but was defeated by Väsby IK.

In March 2013, it underwent a second debt restructuring. In 2013–14 and 2015–16 the team reached the final playoff round for Kvalserien, but lost against Piteå HC and Södertälje SK, respectively. In 2016–17 it qualified for Kvalserien, but finished third and was not promoted to HockeyAllsvenskan. In the following season it was beaten by VIK Västerås HK in the final playoff round. In early 2019, the Swedish Tax Agency requested that the club be declared bankrupt due to unpaid debts. It paid the debts before the date of the bankruptcy hearing, and the request was withdrawn. In the same season the team reached Kvalserien again and was promoted to HockeyAllsvenskan for the first time after winning away against Almtuna IS in overtime in the decisive last-round game. In the following season, Kristianstad finished 13th out of 14 teams in HockeyAllsvenskan, and were to play in Kvalserien to try to avoid relegation. However, Kvalserien was cancelled due to the COVID-19 pandemic and there was no results-based promotion or relegation. In 2020–21, Kristianstad finished last in the league and had to play a play-out series against 13th-placed Väsby; it won the series by 3 games to 2 and avoided relegation.

== Colours and logo ==
Kristianstad plays in green home jerseys. Since 2016 it has used orange as a secondary colour as part of the promotion Den Orangea Staden ("the orange city"), a cooperation with IFK Kristianstad (men's handball), Kristianstad HK (women's handball), Kristianstad FC (men's association football), Kristianstads DFF (women's association football) and Kristianstad Predators (American football).

Kristianstad has two logos, the club logo and a secondary logo. It has used the club logo on the jerseys since 2013, having previously used the secondary logo for that purpose.

== Honoured players ==
Three players have their jerseys hanging in the rafters in Kristianstads ishall: forwards Roger Persson (1992–2001) and Jonas Svensson (1987–1989, 1992–1993, 1994–2003) and defenceman Per Schlyter (1988–1998, 1999–2002, 2003–2004).

== Season-by-season ==
| Year | Level | Division | Record | | Avg. home atnd. | Notes | Ref. |
| Year | Level | Division | Position | W–T–L W–OT–L | Avg. home atnd. | Notes | Ref. |
|---|---|---|---|---|---|---|---|
| 2005–06 | Tier 3 | Division 1F | 6th of 12 | 23–4–17 | 843 | | |
| 2006–07 | Tier 3 | Division 1F | 2nd of 10 | 20–9–7 | 736 | | |
| 2006–07 | Tier 3 | Allettan West | 2nd of 4 | 4–0–2 | 1,113 | | |
| 2006–07 | Tier 3 | Playoffs | — | 0–0–2 | 1,472 | Lost 2–0 in games vs Väsby IK | |
| 2007–08 | Tier 3 | Division 1F | 5th of 10 | 12–6–9 | 1,107 | | |
| 2007–08 | Tier 3 | Division 1F spring | 1st of 6 | 5–2–3 | 570 | | |
| 2007–08 | Tier 3 | Playoffs | — | 0–0–1–1 | 935 | Round 1: Lost 2–0 in games vs Tranås AIF | |
| 2008–09 | Tier 3 | Division 1F | 7th of 10 | 9–5–1–12 | 1,037 | | |
| 2008–09 | Tier 3 | Division 1F spring | 4th of 6 | 3–0–0–7 | 899 | | |
| 2009–10 | Tier 3 | Division 1F | 6th of 10 | 15–1–0–11 | 970 | | |
| 2009–10 | Tier 3 | Division 1F spring | 3rd of 6 | 5–0–0–5 | 927 | | |
| 2010–11 | Tier 3 | Division 1F | 1st of 10 | 21–2–0–4 | 1,020 | | |
| 2010–11 | Tier 3 | Allettan South | 2nd of 8 | 5–5–1–3 | 1,214 | Bye to round 2 | |
| 2010–11 | Tier 3 | Playoffs | — | 0–0–1–1 | 2,157 | Round 2: Lost 2–0 vs Karlskrona HK | |
| 2011–12 | Tier 3 | Division 1F | 1st of 10 | 15–3–3–6 | 1,093 | | |
| 2011–12 | Tier 3 | Allettan South | 7th of 8 | 3–2–1–8 | 1,214 | | |
| 2012–13 | Tier 3 | Division 1F | 3rd of 11 | 15–2–3–10 | 830 | | |
| 2012–13 | Tier 3 | Allettan South | 7th of 8 | 3–2–0–9 | 960 | | |
| 2013–14 | Tier 3 | Division 1F | 5th of 11 | 17–2–2–9 | 843 | | |
| 2013–14 | Tier 3 | Division 1F spring | 1st of 7 | 8–0–0–4 | 658 | | |
| 2013–14 | Tier 3 | Playoffs | — | 3–1–0–3 | 1,571 | Round 1: Won 2–1 in games vs Mariestad BoIS HC; Round 2: Won 2–1 in games vs Hudiksvalls HC; Round 3: Lost 2–0 in games vs Piteå HC | |
| 2014–15 | Tier 3 | Hockeyettan South | 1st of 12 | 17–1–0–4 | 912 | | |
| 2014–15 | Tier 3 | Allettan South | 5th of 8 | 5–2–1–6 | 1,374 | | |
| 2014–15 | Tier 3 | Playoffs | — | 2–0–1–2 | 1,282 | Round 1: Won 2–1 in games vs Helsingborgs HC; Round 2: Lost 2–0 in games vs Tingsryds AIF | |
| 2015–16 | Tier 3 | Hockeyettan South | 5th of 12 | 12–1–3–6 | 866 | | |
| 2015–16 | Tier 3 | Hockeyettan South spring | 1st of 8 | 8–2–1–3 | 857 | | |
| 2015–16 | Tier 3 | Playoffs | — | 5–0–1–3 | 1,481 | Round 1: Won 2–1 in games vs Huddinge IK; Round 2: Won 2–1 in games vs Östersunds IK; Round 3: Lost 2–1 in games vs Södertälje SK | |
| 2016–17 | Tier 3 | Hockeyettan South | 2nd of 11 | 14–2–1–3 | 1,044 | | |
| 2016–17 | Tier 3 | Allettan South | 2nd of 10 | 12–3–1–2 | 1,167 | Bye to round 2 | |
| 2016–17 | Tier 3 | Playoffs | — | 3–1–0–0 | 1,533 | Round 2: Won 2–0 in games vs Nybro Vikings IF; Round 3: Won 2–0 in games vs Vimmerby HC | |
| 2016–17 | HockeyAllsvenskan qualifiers | | 3rd of 6 | 5–1–1–3 | 1,592 | | |
| 2017–18 | Tier 3 | Hockeyettan South | 2nd of 12 | 13–3–1–5 | 1,027 | | |
| 2017–18 | Tier 3 | Allettan South | 2nd of 10 | 13–0–0–5 | 1,083 | Bye to round 2 | |
| 2017–18 | Tier 3 | Playoffs | — | 2–1–0–2 | 1,467 | Round 2: Won 2–0 in games vs Tranås AIF; Round 3: Lost 2–1 in games vs VIK Västerås HK | |
| 2018–19 | Tier 3 | Hockeyettan South | 4th of 12 | 12–2–2–6 | 974 | | |
| 2018–19 | Tier 3 | Allettan South | 2nd of 10 | 8–4–3–3 | 1,069 | Bye to round 2 | |
| 2018–19 | Tier 3 | Playoffs | — | 3–1–0–1 | 1,405 | Round 2: Won 2–0 in games vs Segeltorps IF; Round 3: Won 2–1 in games vs Vimmerby HC | |
| 2018–19 | HockeyAllsvenskan qualifiers | | 2nd of 6 | 5–2–1–2 | 1,511 | Promoted | |
