= 2009–10 Division 1 season (Swedish ice hockey) =

- League: Division 1
- Sport: Ice hockey
- Number of teams: 58
- Promoted to Division 1: Tingsryds AIF
- Relegated to Division 2: Njurunda SK; Bålsta HC; Mälarh./Bredäng; Trångsunds IF; IFK Munkfors

Division 1 seasons
- ← 2008–09 2010–11 →

2009–10 was the 11th season that Division 1 functioned as the third-level of ice hockey in Sweden, below the second-level HockeyAllsvenskan and the top-level Elitserien (now the SHL).

== Format ==
The 58 participating teams played the first half of the season in six groups divided geographically. The successful teams then moved into three new groups (the Allettan groups), while the remaining teams played in a continuation of their smaller existing groups. The teams with the worst records in these continuation groups were then forced to defend their places in Division 1 against challengers from Division 2 (see "relegation tournament" below) in a round-robin tournament called Kvalserien till Division 1. Meanwhile, the successful teams from the Allettan groups along with the group winners of the continuation groups played a playoff to determine who would have a chance to compete for promotion to the second-tier league HockeyAllsvenskan in Kvalserien till HockeyAllsvenskan.

== First round ==
=== Division 1A ===
	Club	GP	W	OTW	SOW	SOL	OTL	L	GF	GA	Pts
1.	Asplöven HC	21	16	1	0	1	0	3	124	55	51
2.	Piteå HC	21	15	1	0	0	2	3	115	48	49
3.	Kiruna IF	21	13	1	1	0	1	5	94	73	44
4.	Lycksele SK	21	9	0	2	0	1	9	86	80	32
5.	Bodens HF	21	8	2	0	0	1	10	82	84	29
6.	Kalix HC	21	6	1	0	2	1	11	71	85	23
7.	Luleå Rebels HC	21	6	0	0	0	0	15	51	105	18
8.	Clemensnäs HC	21	2	0	0	0	0	19	34	127	6

=== Division 1B ===
	Club	GP	W	OTW	SOW	SOL	OTL	L	GF	GA	Pts
1.	Östersund/Brunflo IF	21	16	0	1	0	0	4	113	53	50
2.	KB 65	21	15	1	0	0	0	5	106	55	47
3.	Hudiksvalls HC	21	13	0	2	1	0	5	73	46	44
4.	Kovlands IF	21	11	1	1	0	0	8	81	66	37
5.	Njurunda SK	21	6	1	1	1	1	11	57	97	24
6.	Örnsköldsviks SK	21	6	0	0	1	1	13	55	77	20
7.	AIK Härnösand	21	4	1	1	2	0	13	50	90	18
8.	Sollefteå HK	21	3	0	0	1	2	15	61	112	12

=== Division 1C ===
	Club	GP	W	OTW	SOW	SOL	OTL	L	GF	GA	Pts
1.	Borlänge HF	27	22	2	0	0	0	3	156	73	70
2.	Enköpings SK	27	18	0	1	0	0	8	119	66	56
3.	IFK Arboga	27	17	0	1	0	0	9	99	67	53
4.	Hedemora SK	27	15	0	0	0	3	9	113	106	48
5.	Valbo HC	27	14	1	1	0	1	10	121	114	47
6.	Tierps HK	27	11	2	0	1	1	12	85	92	39
7.	Lindlövens IF	27	7	1	2	1	1	15	87	103	29
8.	Bålsta HC	27	7	3	0	0	0	17	82	112	27
9.	Surahammars IF	27	7	0	0	0	3	17	90	137	24
10.	Linden HC	27	2	1	0	3	1	20	61	143	12

=== Division 1D ===
	Club	GP	W	OTW	SOW	SOL	OTL	L	GF	GA	Pts
1.	Huddinge IK	22	16	1	1	0	0	4	101	46	52
2.	Nyköpings HK	22	11	1	0	2	1	7	91	66	38
3.	Nynäshamns IF	22	11	1	1	0	1	8	87	72	38
4.	Wings HC Arlanda	22	11	1	1	1	0	8	71	58	38
5.	Botkyrka HC	22	10	0	3	0	1	8	82	79	37
6.	Väsby IK	22	10	0	1	2	0	9	79	76	34
7.	Vallentuna BK	22	11	0	0	0	1	10	71	81	34
8.	Nacka HK	22	10	1	0	0	1	10	71	80	33
9.	Visby-Roma HK	22	9	0	0	1	2	10	77	71	30
10.	Järfälla HC	22	10	0	0	0	0	12	75	87	30
11.	Trångsunds IF	22	4	4	0	1	2	11	63	90	23
12.	Mälarhöjden/Br.	22	2	1	0	0	1	18	63	125	9

=== Division 1E ===
	Club	GP	W	OTW	SOW	SOL	OTL	L	GF	GA	Pts
1.	Skåre BK	27	17	3	4	0	0	3	115	67	65
2.	Skövde IK	27	17	1	0	4	1	4	119	69	58
3.	HC Vita Hästen	27	16	0	0	1	1	9	135	73	50
4.	Mariestads BoIS	27	14	1	2	0	1	9	101	86	49
5.	Tranås AIF	27	12	0	0	0	2	13	132	124	38
6.	IFK Munkfors	27	9	2	0	1	1	14	77	117	33
7.	Sunne IK	27	10	1	0	0	0	16	94	114	32
8.	IFK Kumla	27	8	0	2	1	1	15	56	81	30
9.	Västerviks IK	27	6	1	1	2	1	16	80	126	25
10.	Mjölby HC	27	6	1	1	1	2	16	80	132	25

=== Division 1F ===
	Club	GP	W	OTW	SOW	SOL	OTL	L	GF	GA	Pts
1.	Tingsryds AIF	27	23	1	1	1	1	0	125	41	75
2.	Olofströms IK	27	18	0	1	0	2	6	115	77	58
3.	IK Pantern	27	14	2	1	1	2	7	103	75	51
4.	Nybro IF	27	15	0	1	1	1	9	123	66	49
5.	Karlskrona HK	27	13	2	0	2	2	8	103	91	47
6.	Kristianstads IK	27	15	1	0	0	0	11	82	74	47
7.	Halmstad HF	27	8	2	1	1	2	13	71	99	33
8.	Mörrums GoIS	27	5	2	0	0	1	19	72	133	20
9.	Gislaveds SK	27	5	0	0	1	0	21	67	131	16
10.	Kungälvs IK	27	1	1	2	0	0	23	58	132	9

== AllEttan ==
=== Northern Group (A/B) ===
	Club	GP	W	OTW	SOW	SOL	OTL	L	GF	GA	Pts
1.	Kiruna IF	14	9	0	1	1	1	2	63	29	31
2.	Asplöven HC	14	9	1	0	0	2	2	71	44	31
3.	Hudiksvalls HC	14	8	0	1	1	0	4	48	37	27
4.	Piteå HC	14	7	0	1	0	2	4	56	41	25
5.	Östersund/Brunflo IF	14	5	2	0	2	0	5	58	51	21
6.	Kovlands IF	14	4	0	2	0	0	8	42	65	16
7.	KB 65	14	3	2	0	0	0	9	40	53	13
8.	Lycksele SK	14	1	0	0	1	0	12	21	79	4

=== Central Group (C/D) ===
	Club	GP	W	OTW	SOW	SOL	OTL	L	GF	GA	Pts
1.	Huddinge IK	14	11	0	0	1	1	1	76	39	35
2.	Enköpings SK	14	9	2	0	0	0	3	64	25	31
3.	IFK Arboga	14	10	0	0	0	0	4	48	35	30
4.	Nyköpings HK	14	6	0	1	0	0	7	54	50	20
5.	Wings HC Arlanda	14	5	0	1	0	1	7	47	53	18
6.	Nynäshamns IF	14	4	0	0	1	1	8	40	69	14
7.	Borlänge HF	14	3	0	0	0	1	10	36	56	10
8.	Hedemora SK	14	2	2	0	0	0	10	38	76	10

=== Southern Group (E/F) ===
	Club	GP	W	OTW	SOW	SOL	OTL	L	GF	GA	Pts
1.	Tingsryds AIF	14	10	0	0	1	1	2	54	32	32
2.	HC Vita Hästen	14	8	0	2	2	0	2	49	34	30
3.	Olofströms IK	14	8	0	1	1	0	4	62	39	27
4.	Nybro IK	14	6	1	1	3	0	3	40	36	25
5.	Skövde IK	14	5	0	1	1	0	7	44	42	18
6.	Skåre BK	14	3	0	3	0	0	8	40	54	15
7.	IK Pantern	14	2	1	0	1	2	8	28	56	11
8.	Mariestads BoIS	14	2	1	1	0	0	10	33	57	10

== Qualification round ==
=== Division 1A ===
	Club	GP	W	OTW	SOW	SOL	OTL	L	GF	GA	Pts (Bonus)
1.	Bodens HF	9	6	0	1	1	0	1	40	18	25(4)
2.	Kalix HC	9	5	0	1	2	0	1	37	18	21(2)
3.	Luleå Rebels HC	9	4	0	1	0	0	4	28	34	15(1)
4.	Clemensnäs HC	9	0	0	0	0	0	9	16	51	0(0)

=== Division 1B ===
	Club	GP	W	OTW	SOW	SOL	OTL	L	GF	GA	Pts (Bonus)
1.	Sollefteå HK	9	6	0	1	1	1	0	48	26	22(0)
2.	AIK Härnösand	9	5	1	1	0	0	2	40	33	20(1)
3.	Örnsköldsviks SK	9	3	1	0	1	0	4	35	39	14(2)
4.	Njurunda SK	9	0	0	0	0	1	8	25	50	5(4)

=== Division 1C ===
	Club	GP	W	OTW	SOW	SOL	OTL	L	GF	GA	Pts (Bonus)
1.	Valbo HC	10	6	0	1	0	1	2	44	29	29(8)
2.	Surahammars IF	10	7	1	0	1	0	1	47	30	25(1)
3.	Lindlövens IF	10	5	0	1	1	0	3	49	40	22(4)
4.	Tierps HK	10	5	0	0	0	0	5	42	31	21(6)
5.	Bålsta HC	10	3	0	0	0	0	7	41	57	11(2)
6.	Linden HC	10	1	0	0	0	0	9	25	61	3(0)

=== Division 1D ===
	Club	GP	W	OTW	SOW	SOL	OTL	L	GF	GA	Pts (Bonus)
1.	Visby-Roma HK	14	9	4	0	0	0	1	60	33	39(4)
2.	Väsby IK	14	8	0	1	0	2	3	65	44	38(10)
3.	Vallentuna BK	14	6	1	0	2	1	4	51	44	31(8)
4.	Botkyrka HC	14	5	1	0	0	2	6	48	56	31(12)
5.	Nacka HK	14	6	1	0	0	1	6	41	46	27(6)
6.	Järfälla HC	14	6	0	0	0	1	7	44	47	21(2)
7.	Mälarh./Bredäng	14	4	0	1	0	0	9	41	57	14(0)
8.	Trångsunds IF	14	3	0	0	0	0	11	40	63	10(1)

=== Division 1E ===
	Club	GP	W	OTW	SOW	SOL	OTL	L	GF	GA	Pts (Bonus)
1.	Tranås AIF	10	5	0	0	1	0	4	44	38	24(8)
2.	Sunne IK	10	6	1	0	0	0	3	37	37	24(4)
3.	Västerviks IK	10	5	0	2	0	0	3	43	37	20(1)
4.	IFK Kumla	10	5	0	0	1	0	4	43	36	18(2)
5.	IFK Munkfors	10	2	0	1	1	1	5	31	47	16(6)
6.	Mjölby HC	10	3	0	0	0	0	7	38	41	9(0)

=== Division 1F ===
	Club	GP	W	OTW	SOW	SOL	OTL	L	GF	GA	Pts (Bonus)
1.	Karlskrona HK	10	8	0	0	0	0	2	42	19	32(8)
2.	Gislaveds SK	10	8	0	0	0	0	2	36	31	25(1)
3.	Kristianstads IK	10	5	0	0	0	0	5	34	29	21(6)
4.	Halmstad HF	10	2	1	0	0	0	7	26	42	12(4)
5.	Mörrums GoIS	10	3	0	0	0	0	7	34	41	11(2)
6.	Kungälvs IK	10	3	0	0	0	1	6	30	40	10(0)

== Playoffs ==
=== First round ===
- Bodens HC - Hudiksvalls HC 0:2 (1:2, 2:3)
- Sollefteå HK - Piteå HC 0:2 (1:5, 2:7)
- Valbo HC - IFK Arboga 0:2 (1:4, 1:4)
- Visby-Roma HK - Nyköpings HK 0:2 (1:2, 3:4 OT)
- Tranås AIF - Olofströms IK 0:2 (4:7, 3:5)
- Karlskrona HK - Nybro IF 1:2 (3:2, 0:6, 2:4)

=== Second round ===
- Piteå HC - Asplöven HC 1:2 (6:3, 0:4, 2:3)
- Hudiksvalls HC - HC Vita Hästen 0:2 (1:10, 3:4 SO)
- Nybro IF - IFK Arboga 2:0 (6:1, 2:0)
- Nyköpings HK - Olofströms IK 0:2 (3:4, 1:6)

=== Final ===
- Asplöven HC - Enköpings HK 1:2 (5:3, 1:5, 1:3)
- HC Vita Hästen - Tingsryds AIF 1:2 (2:1, 1:7, 4:5 OT)
- Nybro IF - Kiruna IF 2:0 (11:0, 4:0)
- Olofströms IK - Huddinge IK 2:0 (5:2, 5:4)

== Relegation ==
=== Division 1A ===
	Club	GP	W	OTW	SOW	SOL	OTL	L	GF	GA	Pts
1.	Clemensnäs HC	4	2	0	0	0	1	1	10	10	7
2.	Luleå Rebels HC	4	1	1	0	0	1	1	8	9	6
3.	Tegs SK	4	1	1	0	0	0	2	10	9	5

=== Division 1B ===
	Club	GP	W	OTW	SOW	SOL	OTL	L	GF	GA	Pts
1.	Örnsköldsviks SK	4	3	0	0	0	0	1	38	14	9
2.	Kramfors	4	3	0	0	0	0	1	14	18	9
3.	Njurunda SK	4	0	0	0	0	0	4	12	32	0

=== Division 1C ===
	Club	GP	W	OTW	SOW	SOL	OTL	L	GF	GA	Pts
1.	IFK Ore	8	6	0	0	0	1	1	35	21	19
2.	Falu IF	8	3	2	0	0	1	2	29	32	14
3.	Åkers IF	8	3	1	0	0	2	2	29	25	13
4.	Trångsunds IF	8	2	1	0	0	1	4	28	29	9
5.	Bålsta HC	8	1	1	0	0	0	6	22	36	5

=== Division 1D ===
	Club	GP	W	OTW	SOW	SOL	OTL	L	GF	GA	Pts
1.	Nacka HK	10	6	1	0	0	2	1	40	35	22
2.	Järfälla HC	10	6	1	0	0	0	3	45	28	20
3.	Mälarh./Bredäng	10	6	0	0	0	0	4	49	40	18
4.	Värmdö HC	10	4	0	0	0	0	6	30	41	12
5.	Haninge HF	10	2	1	0	0	1	6	29	37	9
6.	Sollentuna HC	10	2	1	0	0	1	6	31	43	9

=== Division 1E ===
	Club	GP	W	OTW	SOW	SOL	OTL	L	GF	GA	Pts
1.	Mjölby HC	8	6	1	0	0	0	1	40	19	20
2.	Grästorps IK	8	5	1	0	0	1	1	40	18	18
3.	IFK Munkfors	8	5	0	0	0	0	3	34	31	15
4.	Grums IK	8	1	0	0	0	1	6	26	44	4
5.	Kils AIK	8	1	0	0	0	0	7	22	50	3

=== Division 1F ===
	Club	GP	W	OTW	SOW	SOL	OTL	L	GF	GA	Pts
1.	Kungälvs IK	8	6	1	0	0	0	1	33	15	20
2.	Mörrums GoIS	8	4	1	0	0	1	2	31	22	15
3.	Kallinge-Ronneby	8	3	1	0	0	1	3	29	23	12
4.	Helsingborgs HC	8	2	0	0	0	1	5	17	35	7
5.	Boro/Vetlanda HC	8	2	0	0	0	0	6	20	35	6
