= Andreas Sundin =

Swedish ice hockey player (born 1984)

- Born: March 15, 1984 (age 41) Linköping, Sweden
- Height: 6 ft 0 in (183 cm)
- Weight: 191 lb (87 kg; 13 st 9 lb)
- Position: Left wing
- Shot: Left
- Swe-2 team Former teams: Bofors IK; Västerås IK Ungdom; Mörrums GoIS IK; Nybro Vikings IF
- NHL draft: 170th overall, 2003; Detroit Red Wings
- Playing career: 2003–2015

Andreas Sundin (born June 9, 1984, in Ånge, Sweden) is a former professional Swedish ice hockey player. He was a forward who played for Bofors IK who is now named BIK Karlskoga in HockeyAllsvenskan. The last club he played for was Mjölby HC in the swedish Division 2.

== Career statistics ==
			Regular Season					Playoffs
Season	Team	League	GP	G	A	Pts	PIM	GP	G	A	Pts	PIM
2000–01	Linköpings HC	J18	6	8	5	13	4	—	—	—	—	—
2000–01	Linköpings HC	SWE.2 U20	24	8	2	10	4	—	—	—	—	—
2001–02	Linköpings HC	SWE.2 U20	19	31	13	44	8	3	4	0	4	2
2002–03	Linköpings HC	SEL	8	0	1	1	0	—	—	—	—	—
2002–03	Linköpings HC	SWE.2 U20	—	—	—	—	—	3	4	3	7	6
2003–04	Linköpings HC	J20	20	16	16	32	12	—	—	—	—	—
2003–04	Linköpings HC	SEL	28	0	0	0	0	5	0	0	0	0
2003–04	Västerås IK	Allsv	13	4	5	9	0	—	—	—	—	—
2004–05	Linköpings HC	SEL	2	0	0	0	0	—	—	—	—	—
2004–05	Mörrums GoIS IK	Allsv	37	11	9	20	10	10	1	2	3	0
2005–06	Nybro Vikings	Allsv	34	3	3	6	6	—	—	—	—	—
2006–07	Jukurit	Mestis	45	21	20	41	33	14	3	4	7	4
2007–08	Bofors IK	Allsv	45	15	22	37	8	—	—	—	—	—
2008–09	Bofors IK	Allsv	42	15	16	31	12	—	—	—	—	—
2009–10	IF Troja/Ljungby	Allsv	41	17	8	25	4	—	—	—	—	—
2010–11	IF Troja/Ljungby	Allsv	50	8	17	25	12	—	—	—	—	—
2011–12	Odense Bulldogs	DEN	36	19	18	37	14	15	4	3	7	2
2012–13	Odense Bulldogs	DEN	39	7	28	35	4	10	3	4	7	2
2013–14	Frederikshavn White Hawks	DEN	38	11	24	35	2	11	5	9	14	0
2014–15	Mjölby HC	SWE.4	8	5	8	13	2	5	1	2	3	0
SEL totals			38	0	1	1	0	5	0	0	0	0
Allsv totals			262	73	80	153	52	10	1	2	3	0
DEN totals			113	37	70	107	20	36	12	16	28	4
