= 2003–04 Allsvenskan (ice hockey) season =

Swedish ice hockey season

The 2003–04 Allsvenskan season was the fifth season of the Allsvenskan, the second level of ice hockey in Sweden. 24 teams participated in the league, and Mora IK, Hammarby IF, AIK, and Skellefteå AIK qualified for the Kvalserien.

== Regular season ==
=== Northern Group ===
	Club	GP	W	OTW	OTL	L	GF	GA	Pts
1.	Skellefteå AIK	32	24	3	3	2	148	55	81
2.	Hammarby IF	32	26	0	1	5	126	61	79
3.	IF Sundsvall Hockey	32	20	1	5	6	114	70	67
4.	AIK	32	16	3	4	9	110	77	58
5.	Piteå HC	32	15	4	4	9	119	93	57
6.	Nyköpings Hockey	32	15	3	3	11	91	89	54
7.	Bodens IK	32	11	4	2	15	78	91	41
8.	IF Björklöven	32	9	3	5	15	89	104	40
9.	Almtuna IS	32	10	2	1	19	96	105	35
10.	Huddinge IK	32	6	6	2	18	89	124	32
11.	Tegs SK	32	6	1	1	24	71	154	21
12.	Vallentuna BK	32	2	2	1	27	55	163	11

=== Southern Group ===
	Club	GP	W	OTW	OTL	L	GF	GA	Pts
1.	IK Oskarshamn	32	19	3	4	6	116	70	67
2.	Mora IK	32	17	5	2	8	119	76	63
3.	Bofors IK	32	18	3	0	11	105	82	60
4.	Västerås IK	32	17	3	2	10	104	81	59
5.	Halmstad Hammers HC	32	17	2	3	10	91	83	58
6.	Rögle BK	32	15	5	2	10	110	89	57
7.	Växjö Lakers	32	16	1	7	8	107	95	57
8.	Nybro IF	32	10	3	1	18	95	117	37
9.	IFK Arboga IK	32	9	2	4	17	85	100	35
10.	HC Örebro 90	32	9	0	4	19	74	118	31
11.	IF Troja-Ljungby	32	9	1	1	21	69	113	30
12.	Mörrums GoIS IK	32	4	4	2	22	83	134	22

== SuperAllsvenskan ==
	Club	GP	W	OTW	OTL	L	GF	GA	Pts
1.	Mora IK	14	8	2	2	2	50	27	30
2.	Hammarby IF	14	8	1	2	3	40	37	28
3.	Skellefteå AIK	14	7	2	0	5	50	35	25
4.	IF Sundsvall Hockey	14	5	3	2	4	40	42	23
5.	AIK	14	5	3	1	5	47	39	22
6.	Bofors IK	14	5	2	2	5	38	37	21
7.	Västerås IK	14	2	0	4	8	24	49	10
8.	IK Oskarshamn	14	1	2	2	9	34	57	9

== Qualification round ==
=== Northern Group ===
	Club	GP	W	OTW	OTL	L	GF	GA	Pts (Bonus)
1.	Nyköpings Hockey	14	9	2	2	1	56	26	39(6)
2.	Piteå HC	14	7	1	2	4	54	38	32(7)
3.	Almtuna IS	14	7	3	1	3	48	36	31(3)
4.	IF Björklöven	14	7	0	3	4	42	35	28(4)
5.	Huddinge IK	14	6	1	1	6	51	42	23(2)
6.	Bodens IK	14	3	4	1	6	38	38	23(5)
7.	Vallentuna BK	14	4	2	1	7	30	54	17(0)
8.	Tegs SK	14	0	0	2	12	24	74	3(1)

=== Southern Group ===
	Club	GP	W	OTW	OTL	L	GF	GA	Pts (Bonus)
1.	Nybro IF	14	11	1	0	2	60	33	39(4)
2.	Växjö Lakers	14	9	1	1	3	53	26	35(5)
3.	Rögle BK	14	7	3	2	2	51	33	35(6)
4.	IFK Arboga IK	14	6	2	0	6	45	42	25(3)
5.	Mörrums GoIS IK	14	5	0	3	6	34	39	18(0)
6.	Halmstad Hammers HC	14	2	2	1	9	35	47	18(7)
7.	IF Troja-Ljungby	14	4	1	2	7	38	47	17(1)
8.	HC Örebro 90	14	2	0	1	11	17	66	9(2)

== Playoffs ==
=== First round ===
- Nybro IF - Bofors IK 0:2 (3:4 OT., 2:5)
- Nyköpings Hockey - AIK 0:2 (0:6, 1:2 OT)
- Växjö Lakers - IF Sundsvall Hockey 2:0 (2:1, 4:3 OT)
- Piteå HC - Skellefteå AIK 1:2 (2:1 OT, 1:5, 1:4)

=== Second round ===
- Bofors IK - AIK 1:2 (2:1, 2:4, 1:3)
- Växjö Lakers - Skellefteå AIK 1:2 (2:1 OT, 2:3 OT, 1:5)

== Relegation round ==
=== Northern Group ===
	Club	GP	W	OTW	OTL	L	GF	GA	Pts
1.	Uppsala Hockey	8	7	1	0	0	32	18	23
2.	Tegs SK	8	4	0	0	4	28	20	12
3.	Asplöven HC	8	4	0	0	4	22	24	12
4.	Brunflo IK	8	2	0	1	5	19	29	7
5.	Botkyrka HC	8	2	0	0	6	18	28	6

Vallentuna BK did not participate in the relegation round and were relegated to Division 1.

=== Southern Group ===
	Club	GP	W	OTW	OTL	L	GF	GA	Pts
1.	IF Troja-Ljungby	10	6	2	1	1	38	16	23
2.	Skövde IK	10	6	1	2	1	38	16	22
3.	HC Örebro 90	10	6	1	1	2	43	22	21
4.	Borås HC	10	3	1	1	5	26	32	12
5.	IFK Kumla	10	3	1	0	6	21	34	11
6.	Skåre BK	10	0	0	1	9	13	59	1
