= 2008–09 HockeyAllsvenskan season =

- League: HockeyAllsvenskan
- Sport: Ice hockey
- Duration: 45 game regular season
- Number of teams: 16
- Total attendance: 850,771
- Average attendance: 2,363
- First place: Leksands IF
- Promoted to HockeyAllsvenskan: None
- Relegated to Division 1: Huddinge IK; Mariestad BoIS HC; Nybro Vikings IF; 3 teams relegated due to league contraction to 14 teams

HockeyAllsvenskan seasons
- ← 2007–08 2009–10 →

The 2008–09 HockeyAllsvenskan season was the fourth season of the HockeyAllsvenskan, the second level of ice hockey in Sweden. 16 teams participated in the league, and the top four qualified for the Kvalserien, with the opportunity to be promoted to the Elitserien.

Due to the league reducing the number of teams from 16 to 14 teams for the 2009–10 season, the worst team (Mariestad) was relegated to Division 1 while the other two worst teams, ranked 14–15 (Huddinge and Nybro) had to play in the relegation round for survival in HockeyAllsvenskan. In the relegation round, only the best team (Örebro) qualified for the following HockeyAllsvenskan season.

== Participating teams ==
2008–09 HockeyAllsvenskan teams

== Regular season ==
Pos	Team	Pld	W	OTW	OTL	L	GF	GA	GD	Pts	Qualification
1	Leksands IF	45	30	5	1	9	216	94	+122	101	Advance to Elitserien qualifiers
2	AIK	45	29	3	1	12	152	88	+64	94	Advance to Elitserien qualifiers
3	VIK Västerås	45	24	2	6	13	172	128	+44	82	Advance to Elitserien qualifiers
4	Mora IK	45	22	5	4	14	170	118	+52	80	Advance to playoffs
5	Växjö Lakers	45	22	5	3	15	155	123	+32	79	Advance to playoffs
6	Almtuna IS	45	23	1	7	14	124	105	+19	78	Advance to playoffs
7	IF Troja/Ljungby	45	22	2	3	18	143	162	−19	73	Advance to playoffs
8	Malmö Redhawks	45	17	9	3	16	145	108	+37	72	
9	IF Björklöven	45	16	6	6	17	109	118	−9	66	
10	Bofors IK	45	16	5	4	20	125	145	−20	62	
11	Borås HC	45	16	4	5	20	125	138	−13	61	
12	IF Sundsvall	45	16	4	4	21	104	165	−61	60	
13	IK Oskarshamn	45	17	1	3	24	128	160	−32	56	
14	Huddinge IK	45	9	6	5	25	114	169	−55	44	Advance to HockeyAllsvenskan qualifiers
15	Nybro Vikings	45	7	6	9	23	111	164	−53	42	Advance to HockeyAllsvenskan qualifiers
16	Mariestad BoIS	45	5	5	5	30	97	205	−108	30	Relegated to Division 1 for 2009–10

== Playoffs ==
=== First round ===
- Almtuna IS - Mora IK 2:1 (4:3 n.V., 0:1, 3:0)
- IF Troja-Ljungby - Växjö Lakers Hockey 0:2 (5:6 OT, 3:7)

=== Second round ===
- Almtuna IS - Växjö Lakers Hockey 1:2 (2:1, 2:4, 1:3)

== Elitserien qualifiers ==
Pos	Team	Pld	W	OTW	OTL	L	GF	GA	GD	Pts	Qualification
1	Södertälje SK	10	6	1	2	1	39	26	+13	22	Qualify for 2009–10 Elitserien
2	Rögle BK	10	5	2	0	3	36	26	+10	19	Qualify for 2009–10 Elitserien
3	AIK IF	10	5	0	1	4	28	33	−5	16	Qualify for 2009–10 HockeyAllsvenskan
4	Leksands IF	10	4	1	0	5	31	31	0	14	Qualify for 2009–10 HockeyAllsvenskan
5	Växjö Lakers HC	10	3	0	1	6	28	35	−7	10	Qualify for 2009–10 HockeyAllsvenskan
6	VIK Västerås HK	10	2	1	1	6	29	40	−11	9	Qualify for 2009–10 HockeyAllsvenskan

== HockeyAllsvenskan qualifiers ==
Pos	Team	Pld	W	OTW	OTL	L	GF	GA	GD	Pts	Qualification
1	Örebro HK (P)	10	6	2	1	1	35	21	+14	23	Qualify for 2009–10 HockeyAllsvenskan
2	Tingsryds AIF	10	6	1	0	3	33	22	+11	20	Qualify for 2009–10 Division 1
3	Nybro Vikings IF (R)	10	6	0	0	4	39	23	+16	18	Qualify for 2009–10 Division 1
4	Huddinge IK (R)	10	4	0	2	4	35	37	−2	14	Qualify for 2009–10 Division 1
5	Asplöven HC	10	3	1	0	6	21	41	−20	11	Qualify for 2009–10 Division 1
6	Valbo HC	10	1	0	1	8	22	41	−19	4	Qualify for 2009–10 Division 1

(P) Promoted; (R) Relegated
