= Kalix UHC =

- City: Kalix, Sweden
- League: (Sweden) Division 1
- Division: Norra
- Founded: 2001
- Home arena: Fururinken
- Colors: Red, white, blue

Kalix UHC, or Kalix ungdomshockeyclub (English: Kalix Youth Hockey Club), is a Swedish ice hockey club based in Kalix in northern Sweden. The club was founded in 2001 by members of the community when the area's previous hockey club, Kalix HF, was threatened with bankruptcy. The club's A-team competes in Division 1, the third tier of ice hockey in Sweden, as of the 2013–14 season.

== Season-by-season ==
Year	Level	Division	Record		Avg. home atnd.	Notes	Ref.
Year	Level	Division	Position	W-T-L W-OT-L	Avg. home atnd.	Notes	Ref.
2008–09	Tier 3	Division 1A	7th	2–1–2–19			
2008–09	Tier 3	Division 1A continuation	3rd	3–0–0–3			
2009–10	Tier 3	Division 1A	6th	6–1–3–11			
2009–10	Tier 3	Division 1A continuation	2nd	5–0–3–1			
2010–11	Tier 3	Division 1A	7th	5–1–1–17			
2010–11	Tier 3	Division 1A continuation	5th	5–0–0–7			
2010–11	2011 Division 1 qualifier A		1st	3–0–0–1			
2011–12	Tier 3	Division 1A	7th	5–1–2–13			
2011–12	Tier 3	Division 1A continuation	4th	2–0–1–9			
2011–12	Division 1 qualifier A		1st	2–0–0–0			
2012–13	Tier 3	Division 1A	5th	7–1–0–16	166		
2012–13	Tier 3	Division 1A continuation	2nd	4–0–1–3	136		
2012–13	Division 1 qualifier A		1st	4–0–0–0	168		
2013–14	Tier 3	Division 1 North	6th	22–3–4–15	314		
2013–14	Tier 3	Playoff 1 to HA qualifier	—	0–0–0–2	553		
