= Sundin (surname) =

Sundin is a Swedish surname. It is derived from the Swedish noun sund, strait.

Notable people with the surname include:

- Andreas Sundin, professional Swedish ice hockey player
- Carl Sundin, Swedish sprint canoer
- David Sundin, Swedish comedian and television presenter
- Erik Sundin, Swedish football player
- Fredrik Sundin, professional Swedish ice hockey player
- Mats Sundin, Swedish professional ice hockey player
- Michael Sundin (1961–1989), English television presenter, actor, dancer and trampolinist
- Niklas Sundin, Swedish guitarist of Dark Tranquillity
- Per Sundin (born 1963), Swedish music executive
- Robin Sundin, Swedish Bandy player
- Ronnie Sundin, retired Swedish professional ice hockey defenseman
