= Huddinge IK =

- City: Huddinge, Sweden
- League: Hockeyettan
- Division: East
- Founded: 1950
- Home arena: Björkängshallen
- Colours: Red, white, blue
- Website: www.huddingehockey.com

Franchise history
- 1946–1950: Huddinge IF
- 1950–present: Huddinge IK

Huddinge IK (or Huddinge Hockey), is a Swedish ice hockey team from Huddinge, a southern suburb in Stockholm County. The team is currently playing in the third highest league in Sweden, Hockeyettan. In the middle of the 1990s, a women's floorball section was founded, whose A-team advanced to Elitserien, the highest league, in 2008.

== History ==
Huddinge IK was founded as the ice hockey section of Huddinge IF in 1946, and was spun off into a separate club on January 8, 1950. The club has played 41 seasons in Sweden's second-highest ice hockey league, and has participated in the qualifiers for promotion to the highest league without success more than any other Swedish club. A qualification play off game in 1989 versus Timrå IK was decided by a winning goal for Timrå 1:14 into the third overtime period, and was by then the second longest Swedish hockey game ever played, the longest in the two highest divisions. The game is still among the top 10 longest games.

The last time the team was close to advancing, in the 1992-93 season, they moved their home game versus neighbors AIK to the Globe Arena and reached their spectator record of 12,487, then the fourth largest, but now the tenth largest record for any Swedish club. The larger ones being Frölunda HC - 31,144, HV 71 - 18,884, Djurgårdens IF - 18,070, Leksands IF - 17,319, AIK - 17,098, Färjestads BK - 15,274, Brynäs IF - 15,009, Mora IK - 13.850 and Malmö Redhawks - 13.247. Four of the clubs have gained their new records at outdoor event games, Malmö built a new arena in later days, and Mora's record was set in a game facing Dalecarlia neighbors Leksands IF in the Globe Arena. Huddinge's attendance record is the sixth highest set indoors.

They won the game (5-3). The away game versus AIK, about a month later, was tied 3-3, and had a spectator number of 13,124. For 15 years, these two games between AIK and Huddinge in 1993 were the two Swedish national games outside of the top division and the Swedish Championship competitions with the largest spectator numbers, but in November 2008 that record was lost to IF Malmö Redhawks.

In the 1999/2000 and 2004/05 seasons, the team has been relegated to the present third level league, division 1, but both times there has been an instant comeback. In the 2007/08 season the team had to play a relegation league to remain in HockeyAllsvenskan and didn't make it, but was re-promoted in the middle of the summer on the relegation of Nyköpings Hockey. In the 2008/09 season, however, Huddinge once more had to play the relegation league and didn't make it, and in the 2009/10 season Hudinge won their division 1 and Alletta leagues but lost two straight games in the playoffs for the qualification league, to Olofströms IK. With neighbors AIK promoted for the 2010/11 Elitserien, this made the 2010/11 HockeyAllsvenskan the first time ever with no team from the Stockholm area in the second level league icehockey.

In 2010/11 and 2012/13 Huddinge reached the final qualification league, Kvalserien, for HockeyAllsvenskan promotion, but didn't make it all the way. During the NHL lockout in the 2012/13 season, goaltender Jhonas Enroth practised with the club and played two games, before signing with second tier league team Almtuna IS, playing there until the NHL started. He went on to play in the national team, winning the World Championships in Stockholm, the first time the club had a player in the national team who had played in the club the same season. He was the second player with NHL experience to play competitive games for Huddinge. The first one being Greg Mauldin, who Huddinge had on loan from IK Oskarshamn late in the 2006/07 season.

The team is most renowned as a "plant school" for the more established teams in the area. Famous Swedish ice hockey players such as Michael Nylander, Jan Mertzig, and Mattias Norström have been fostered on the team. Among the 2012/13 World Champions, five players had played in Huddinge. Except for Jhonas Enroth, also Elias Fälth, Dick Axelsson, Staffan Kronwall and Niklas Persson. Persson never in the senior team. Kronwall the only one not fostered in the club. The assisting coach Rikard Grönborg was also a previous Huddinge player.

In the 1953/54 season, when the club entered the third level league for the first time, it had a big name in Swedish ice hockey history on the team - Lars Ljungman, the Swedish ice hockey player who has scored the most goals in the same national game, 12 goals when Sweden beat Belgium 24-1 in the 1947 World Championships in Prague.

Peter Forsberg made his debut game with the senior team for his Swedish club Modo Hockey, when they played Huddinge away, on March 4, 1990.

=== Season-by-season ===
List of Huddinge IK seasons
Season	Level	Division	Record		Avg. home atnd.	Notes	Ref.
Season	Level	Division	Position	W-T-L W-OT-L	Avg. home atnd.	Notes	Ref.
1997–98	Tier 2	Division 1	2nd	13–3–2			
1997–98	Tier 2	Allsvenskan	8th	1–4–9			
1998–99	Tier 2	Division 1	2nd	19–4–5			
1998–99	Tier 2	Allsvenskan	7th	3–3–8			
1999–00	Tier 2	Allsvenskan North	11th	7–4–21	526	Allsvenskan spun off as new 2nd-tier league.	
1999–00	Tier 2	Allsvenskan North spring	8th	3–2–9	275	▼ Relegated to Division 1	
2000–01	Tier 3	Division 1	2nd	22–2–4		▲ Promoted to Allsvenskan	
2001–02	Tier 2	Allsvenskan North	9th	11–2–19	453		
2001–02	Tier 2	Allsvenskan North spring	4th	5–4–5	320		
2002–03	Tier 2	Allsvenskan North	7th	9–7–12	580		
2002–03	Tier 2	Allsvenskan North spring	2nd	10–2–2	367		
2003–04	Tier 2	Allsvenskan North	10th	6–8–18	452		
2003–04	Tier 2	Allsvenskan North spring	5th	6–2–6	336		
2004–05	Tier 2	Allsvenskan South	11th	6–6–18	363		
2004–05	Tier 2	Allsvenskan South spring	7th	2–2–8	374	▼ Relegated to Division 1	
2005–06	Tier 3	Division 1D	1st	28–5–3	311		
2005–06	HockeyAllsvenskan qualifier		1st	5–0–3	790	▲ Promoted to HockeyAllsvenskan	
2006–07	Tier 2	HockeyAllsvenskan	16th	7–9–29	410		
2006–07	HockeyAllsvenskan qualifier		1st	4–3–1	566		
2007–08	Tier 2	HockeyAllsvenskan	15th	12–6–27	505		
2007–08	HockeyAllsvenskan qualifier		3rd	3–1–4	448		
2008–09	Tier 2	HockeyAllsvenskan	14th	9–11–25	536		
2008–09	HockeyAllsvenskan qualifier		4th	4–2–4	369		
2009–10	Tier 3	Division 1D	1st	16–2–4	281		
2009–10	Tier 3	AllEttan Central	1st	11–2–1	313	Bye to third round of playoffs	
2009–10	Tier 3	Playoff to HockeyAllsvenskan qual.	—	0–2	742	Lost third round, 0–2 in games vs Olofström	
2010–11	Tier 3	Division 1D	1st	19–3–5	255		
2010–11	Tier 3	AllEttan Central	1st	12–0–2	283		
2010–11	Tier 3	Playoff to HockeyAllsvenskan qual.	—	2–0	1,327	Won third round 2–0 in games vs Kiruna	
2010–11	HockeyAllsvenskan qualifier		4th	5–1–4	785		
2011–12	Tier 3	Division 1D	5th	14–2–2–9	220		
2011–12	Tier 3	1D continuation	1st	11–2–0–2	196		
2011–12	Tier 3	Playoff to HockeyAllsvenskan qual.	—	3–3	747	Round 1: 2–1 vs Hudiksvall; Round 2: 1–2 vs Asplöven	
2012–13	Tier 3	Division 1D	3rd	16–1–10	289		
2012–13	Tier 3	AttEttan Central	2nd	8–5–1	286	Bye to 2nd round of playoffs	
2012–13	Tier 3	Playoff to HockeyAllsvenskan qual.	—	4–1	722	Round 2: 2–1 vs KRIF; Round 3: 2–0 vs Visby/Roma	
2012–13	HockeyAllsvenskan qualifier		5th	2–2–0–6	731		
2013–14	Tier 3	Division 1D	1st	19–4–1–3	268		
2013–14	Tier 3	AllEttan Central	4th	8–0–3–3	894		
2013–14	Tier 3	Playoff to HA qualifier	—	2–0–1–2	469	Round 1: 2–1 vs Wings HC Arlanda; Round 2: 0–2 vs Visby/Roma HK	
2014–15	Tier 3	Hockeyettan East	1st (of 12)	14–4–1–3	283		
2014–15	Tier 3	Allettan North	3rd (of 8)	8–1–2–3	373		
2014–15	Tier 3	Hockeyettan playoffs	—	4–4	616	Round 1: 2–1 in games vs Haninge Anchors HC; Round 2: 2–1 in games vs Östersunds IK; Round 3: 0–2 in games vs Tingsryds AIF	
2015–16	Tier 3	Hockeyettan East	3rd (of 12)	13–3–1–5	370		
2015–16	Tier 3	Allettan South	4th (of 8)	6–3–0–5	495		
2015–16	Tier 3	Hockeyettan playoffs	—	1–2	544	Round 1: 1–2 in games vs Kristianstads IK	
