= HC Vita Hästen =

- City: Norrköping, Sweden
- League: HockeyEttan
- Founded: 1967
- Home arena: Himmelstalundshallen
- Colours: Red, white
- Head coach: Anders Olsson

HC Vita Hästen is a Swedish hockey club, based in Norrköping, which was founded following the bankruptcy of a previous club called IK Vita Hästen. The team plays in HockeyEttan, the third tier of the Swedish ice hockey system, as of the 2025–26 season.

The current team was founded as Norrköping Hockey immediately following the bankruptcy of the previous club. Norrköping Hockey soon merged with Skärblacka IF to form NSH-96, which soon thereafter took the name Hästen Hockey. Years later, in 2007, the club retook the name "Vita Hästen", but were required by the league to use "HC Vita Hästen" rather than "IK Vita Hästen" to avoid confusion with the first incarnation of "Vita Hästen". The name "Vita Hästen" literally translates to "[The] White Horse".

The previous club, IK Vita Hästen, was a merger in 1967 of the ice hockey sections of rivaling teams IFK Norrköping and IK Sleipner. The merged club was formally called "IF IFK/IKS" but mostly referred to simply as "Norrköping" in the league tables in newspapers and such. However, since IFK Norrköping played in white jerseys and Sleipner was the name of a horse (Norse god Odin's horse), the team soon got the nickname "vita hästen", i e "the white horse". By 1973, this name was so commonly used that it was chosen as the actual club name.

Former Detroit Redwings Defensemen Jonathan Ericsson played a season for HC Vita Hasten in the 2001-2002 season.

== Season-by-season ==
Season	Level	Division	Record		Avg. home atnd.	Notes	Ref.
Season	Level	Division	Position	W-T-L W-OT-L	Avg. home atnd.	Notes	Ref.
2004–05	Tier 3	Division 1D	8th	16–4–16	848		
2005–06	Tier 3	Division 1D	3rd	19–5–12	685		
2006–07	Tier 3	Division 1D	4th	18–6–12	494		
2006–07	Tier 3	Division 1D (spring)	1st	5–0–1	215		
2007–08	Tier 3	Division 1D	1st	22–2–3	819	First season as HC Vita Hästen	
2007–08	Tier 3	AllEttan Mellan	4th	6–4–4	1,425		
2008–09	Tier 3	Division 1E	2nd	21–2–0–4	1,213		
2008–09	Tier 3	AllEttan Södra	5th	7–0–1–6	1,395		
2009–10	Tier 3	Division 1E	3rd	16–0–2–9	1,004		
2009–10	Tier 3	AllEttan Södra	2nd	8–2–2–2	2,153	Bye to Playoff 2	
2009–10	Tier 3	Playoff to HA qualifier	Round 2 Round 3	1–1–0–0; 1–0–1–1	2,212	Won 2–0 in games vs Hudikvalls HC; Lost 1–2 in games vs Tingsryds AIF	
2010–11	Tier 3	Division 1E	1st	20–4–0–3	1,260		
2010–11	Tier 3	AllEttan Södra	1st	10–2–1–1	2,096	Bye to Playoff 3	
2010–11	Tier 3	Playoff to HA qualifier	Round 3	2–0–0–0	3,170	Won 3–0 in games vs Enköpings SK HK	
2010–11	HockeyAllsvenskan qualifier		6th	1–1–1–7	1,823		
2011–12	Tier 3	Division 1E	1st	23–1–2–1	1,210		
2011–12	Tier 3	AllEttan Södra	1st	11–1–1–1	2,003	Bye to Playoff 3	
2011–12	Tier 3	Playoff to HA qualifier	Round 3	1–0–1–1	2,950	Lost 1–2 in games vs Karlskrona HK	
2012–13	Tier 3	Division 1E	1st	21–3–1–2	1,542		
2012–13	Tier 3	AllEttan Södra	1st	10–0–1–3	1,762	Bye to Playoff 3	
2012–13	Tier 3	Playoff to HA qualifier	Round 3	1–1–0–0	3,580	Won 2–0 in games vs Kiruna IF	
2012–13	HockeyAllsvenskan qualifier		4th	4–1–1–4	2,315		
2013–14	Tier 3	Division 1E	1st	18–2–4–3	1,267		
2013–14	Tier 3	AllEttan Södra	1st	9–1–2–2	1,998	Bye to Playoff 3	
2013–14	Tier 3	Playoff to HA qualifier	Round 3	1–1–0–0	3,729	Won 2–0 in games vs Visby/Roma HK	
2013–14	HockeyAllsvenskan qualifier		1st	6–2–1–1	3,772	▲ Promoted to HockeyAllsvenskan	
2014–15	Tier 2	HockeyAllsvenskan	8th	19–6–5–22	2,986	Qualified for playoffs	
2014–15	Tier 2	Playoffs	2nd	3–1–1–0	4,365	Qualified for SHL qualifiers	
2014–15	SHL qualifying playoff		—	0–4	4,251	Lost 0–4 in games vs MODO	
