= BIK Karlskoga =

- City: Karlskoga, Sweden
- League: HockeyAllsvenskan
- Founded: 1943
- Home arena: Nobelhallen
- Colours
- General manager: Torsten Yngvesson
- Head coach: Dennis Hall
- Website: bikkarlskoga.se

Franchise history
- 1943–1963: IFK Bofors
- 1954–1963: Karlskoga IF Ishockey
- 1963–1978: KB 63
- 1978–2011: Bofors IK
- 2011–present: BIK Karlskoga

BIK Karlskoga is a Swedish ice hockey club based in Karlskoga, Sweden. They are currently playing in the second highest league in Sweden, the HockeyAllsvenskan. In 1963, the club IFK Bofors was merged with Karlskoga IF and formed KB 63 (formally IF Karlskoga/Bofors). Between 1978 and 2011 the club was known as Bofors IK, which was then changed to its current name.

Karlskoga has been a stable fixture in Sweden's second tier leagues, playing in HockeyAllsvenskan and its predecessors since 1997. They're the only team to have played all seasons of Sweden's second tier since that time, as well as the only team to have played every season of its current form, HockeyAllsvenskan.

== Team history ==
Founded on April 12, 1978, as Bofors IK.

Karlskoga Municipality municipal board decided to purchase the rights to the club name on December 6, 2011, thus changing its name to BIK Karlskoga.

In 1978, the club elected its first chairperson, Knut Larsson.

== Season by season ==
Year	Level	League	Record		Avg. home atnd.	Notes	Ref.
Year	Level	League	Position	W–OT–L	Avg. home atnd.	Notes	Ref.
1999–2000	Tier 2	Allsvenskan South	7th of 12	13–1–3–15	855		
1999–2000	Tier 2	Allsvenskan South (spring)	3rd of 8	9–0–0–5	1,087		
2000–01	Tier 2	Allsvenskan South	2nd of 12	17–2–3–6	1,655		
2000–01	Tier 2	Superallsvenskan	7th of 8	5–2–0–7	2,948		
2001–02	Tier 2	Allsvenskan South	4th of 12	17–2–3–6	2,281		
2001–02	Tier 2	Superallsvenskan	3rd of 8	6–1–2–5	3,204		
2001–02	Tier 2	Playoffs	—	3-1–2–0	2,285	Won vs IFK Arboga 2–1 in games Won vs Troja/Ljungby 2–1 in games	
2001–02	2002 Elitserien qualifiers		5th of 6	3–0–0–7	2,441		
2002–03	Tier 2	Allsvenskan South	3rd of 12	15–3–4–6	2,102		
2002–03	Tier 2	Superallsvenskan	3rd of 8	6–3–1–4	3,415		
2002–03	Tier 2	Playoffs	—	0–0–1–1	2,720	Lost vs IFK Arboga 0–2 in games	
2003–04	Tier 2	Allsvenskan South	3rd of 12	18–3–0–11	2,382		
2003–04	Tier 2	Superallsvenskan	6th of 8	5–2–2–5	3,204		
2003–04	Tier 2	Playoffs	—	2–1–0–2	3,074	Won vs Nybro IF 2–0 in games Lost vs AIK 1–2 in games	
2004–05	Tier 2	Allsvenskan North	4th of 12	20–3–9	2,393		
2004–05	Tier 2	Superallsvenskan	6th of 8	4–3–7	2,469		
2004–05	Tier 2	Playoffs	—	2–0–0–3	2,342	Won vs Almtuna 2–1 in games Lost vs Oskarshamn 0–2 in games	
2005–06	Tier 2	HockeyAllsvenskan	7th of 15	24–4–14	2,078		
2005–06	2006 Elitserien qualifiers		6th of 6	0–1–9	2,407		
2006–07	Tier 2	HockeyAllsvenskan	11th of 16	15–10–20	1,621		
2007–08	Tier 2	HockeyAllsvenskan	9th of 16	17–9–19	1,805		
2008–09	Tier 2	HockeyAllsvenskan	10th of 16	16–5–4–20	1,693		
2009–10	Tier 2	HockeyAllsvenskan	6th of 14	20–7–11–14	2,123		
2009–10	Tier 2	Playoffs	—	0–0–0–2	3,017	Lost vs Malmö 0–2 in games	
2010–11	Tier 2	HockeyAllsvenskan	10th of 14	17–5–7–23	1,662		
2011–12	Tier 2	HockeyAllsvenskan	3rd of 14	30–4–1–17	2,284	First season as Bofors IK Karlskoga	
2011–12	2012 Elitserien qualifiers		6th of 6	2–1–3–4	3,554		
2012–13	Tier 2	HockeyAllsvenskan	4th of 14	30–3–0–19	2,467		
2012–13	Tier 2	Playoffs	2nd of 4	3–0–0–3	2,852		
2013–14	Tier 2	HockeyAllsvenskan	4th of 14	25–5–9–13	2,673		
2013–14	Tier 2	Playoffs	3rd of 4	1–0–1–4	1,956		
2014–15	Tier 2	HockeyAllsvenskan	5th of 14	22–6–4–20	2,431		
2014–15	Tier 2	Playoffs	6th of 6	0–0–3–2	2,146		
2015–16	Tier 2	HockeyAllsvenskan	5th of 14	20–8–7–17	2,331		
2015–16	Tier 2	Playoffs	3rd of 6	3–0–0–2	1,782		
2016–17	Tier 2	HockeyAllsvenskan	2nd of 14	27–7–2–16	2,656		
2016–17	Tier 2	HockeyAllsvenskan finals	—	0–0–0–3	3,511	Lost 0–3 in games vs Mora	
2016–17	Tier 2	Playoffs	—	1–1–0–1	3,369	Won 2–1 in games vs AIK	
2016–17	SHL qualifiers		—	0–0–2–2	3,364	Lost 0–4 in games vs Rögle	
2017–18	Tier 2	HockeyAllsvenskan	12th of 14	16–8–7–21	2,376		
2018–19	Tier 2	HockeyAllsvenskan	5th of 14	23–6–6–17	2,458		
2018–19	Tier 2	Playoffs	3rd of 6	2–0–1–2	2,505		
