= 2012–13 HockeyAllsvenskan season =

- League: HockeyAllsvenskan
- Sport: Ice hockey
- Duration: 12 September 2012 – 5 April 2013
- Teams: 14
- Average attendance: 3,227
- TV partner: Viasat
- First place: Leksands IF
- Top scorer: Evan McGrath (IKO)
- Promoted to SEL: Örebro HK; Leksands IF

HockeyAllsvenskan seasons
- 2011–12 2013–14

The 2012–13 HockeyAllsvenskan season was the 8th season of the HockeyAllsvenskan (14th including seasons under the name "Allsvenskan"), the second-highest level of ice hockey in Sweden. The regular season began on 12 September 2012 and ended on 2 March 2013, with the following playoffs and Kvalserien tournaments running until 5 April 2013. Leksands IF, following a season marked by financial instability and scandal, secured first place in the regular season standings, and continued to the qualification round for the 2013–14 SHL/Elitserien season, along with second-place Södertälje SK, third place VIK Västerås HK, and playoff winner Örebro HK. Meanwhile, 13th- and 14th-ranked Tingsryds AIF and Karlskrona HK were forced to defend their places in HockeyAllsvenskan for the 2013–14 season.

This HockeyAllsvenskan season is notable for the participation of players from the National Hockey League during the 2012–13 NHL lockout.

HockeyAllsvenskan had an average attendance of 3,227 spectators in 2012–13, comfortably the highest attendance of any second-tier league in Europe (beating the 2nd Bundesliga with 2,267), also making HockeyAllsvenskan the eighth most attended European hockey league. It was a 23.8 percent increase over the 2011–12 season's attendance average.

== Participating teams ==
2012–13 HockeyAllsvenskan teams

Team	Location	2011–12 finish	Arena	Capacity	Notes
Almtuna IS	Uppsala	11th	Gränbyhallen	2,562	
Asplöven HC	Haparanda	D1	Arena Polarica	1,200	Promoted from 2011–12 Division 1
BIK Karlskoga	Karlskoga	3rd	Nobelhallen	6,300	Formerly "Bofors IK Karlskoga"
Djurgårdens IF	Stockholm	SEL	Hovet	8,094	Demoted from 2011–12 Elitserien
Karlskrona HK	Karlskrona	D1	Telenor Arena	3,464	Promoted from 2011–12 Division 1
Leksands IF	Leksand	2nd	Tegera Arena	7,650	
Malmö Redhawks	Malmö	7th	Malmö Arena	12,500	
Mora IK	Mora	8th	FM Mattsson Arena	4,500	
IK Oskarshamn	Oskarshamn	6th	Arena Oskarshamn	3,424	
Södertälje SK	Södertälje	9th	AXA Sports Center	6,130	
Tingsryds AIF	Tingsryd	12th	Nelson Garden Arena	3,650	
IF Troja/Ljungby	Ljungby	10th	Sunnerbohov	3,700	
VIK Västerås HK	Västerås	4th	ABB Arena	5,800	
Örebro HK	Örebro	1st	Behrn Arena	5,150	

== Participating locked-out NHL players ==
Skaters
Name	Pos	Club	NHL-club	GP	P	G	A
Mikael Backlund	F	Västerås	Calgary	23	30	12	18
Patrik Berglund	F	Västerås	St. Louis	30	32	20	12
Chris Butler	F	Karlskrona	Calgary	5	0	0	0
Cam Fowler	D	Södertälje	Anaheim	13	7	2	5
Carl Gunnarsson	D	Örebro	Toronto	9	4	0	4
Carl Hagelin	D	Södertälje	NY Rangers	8	11	5	6
Patric Hörnqvist	F	Djurgårdens IF	Nashville	10	5	2	3
Marcus Johansson	F	Karlskoga	Washington	16	18	8	10
Anze Kopitar	F	Mora	Los Angeles	30	34	10	24
Gabriel Landeskog	F	Djurgårdens IF	Colorado	17	14	6	8
Mark Letestu	F	Almtuna	Columbus	6	4	4	0
Mike Lundin	D	Almtuna	Ottawa	7	4	0	4
Brendan Mikkelson	D	Västerås	Tampa Bay	17	7	3	4
Douglas Murray	F	Djurgårdens IF	San Jose	14	3	1	2
Mason Raymond	F	Örebro	Vancouver	1	1	1	0
Matt Read	F	Södertälje	Philadelphia	20	24	6	18
Bobby Ryan	F	Mora	Anaheim	10	13	10	3
Mike Santorelli	F	Tingsryd	Florida	4	1	0	1
Goalies
Name	Pos.	Club	NHL-club	GP	SAVE%		
Jhonas Enroth	G	Almtuna	Buffalo	15	.917		
Viktor Fasth	G	Tingsryd	Anaheim	12	.942		

== Final standings ==
Pos	Team	Pld	W	OTW	OTL	L	GF	GA	GD	Pts	Qualification
1	Leksands IF (P)	52	31	5	6	10	177	122	+55	109	Qualified for Elitserien qualifiers
2	Södertälje SK	52	29	7	2	14	157	114	+43	103	Qualified for Elitserien qualifiers
3	VIK Västerås	52	28	5	4	15	146	110	+36	98	Qualified for Elitserien qualifiers
4	BIK Karlskoga	52	30	3	0	19	161	127	+34	96	Qualified for playoffs
5	Djurgårdens IF	52	26	3	8	15	152	124	+28	92	Qualified for playoffs
6	Örebro HK (P)	52	26	4	3	19	154	123	+31	89	Qualified for playoffs
7	IK Oskarshamn	52	22	4	3	23	157	152	+5	77	Qualified for playoffs
8	Mora IK	52	20	7	2	23	139	147	−8	76	
9	Malmö Redhawks	52	20	3	5	24	151	150	+1	71	
10	IF Troja/Ljungby	52	20	3	3	26	124	162	−38	69	
11	Asplöven HC	52	17	4	4	27	138	186	−48	63	
12	Almtuna IS	52	15	2	7	28	118	143	−25	56	
13	Tingsryds AIF (R)	52	14	4	6	28	108	143	−35	56	Qualified for HockeyAllsvenskan qualifiers
14	Karlskrona HK	52	11	1	2	38	107	186	−79	37	Qualified for HockeyAllsvenskan qualifiers

(P) Promoted; (R) Relegated

=== Statistics ===
==== Average attendance ====
Club	Home attendance	
Club	Average	Total
Djurgårdens IF	6,184	160,789
Malmö Redhawks	5,794	150,631
Leksands IF	5,000	129,991
Södertälje SK	3,644	94,747
Örebro HK	3,618	94,073
VIK Västerås HK	3,326	86,481
Mora IK	3,099	80,583
Karlskrona HK	2,890	75,148
BIK Karlskoga	2,467	64,148
IK Oskarshamn	2,268	58,975
Tingsryds AIF	2,092	54,389
IF Troja/Ljungby	1,866	48,503
Almtuna IS	1,504	39,108
Asplöven HC	1,431	37,200
League	3,227	1,174,766

== Post-season ==
=== Playoff series ===
Teams 4–7 qualified for a playoff series (Swedish: PlayOff-serien, in previous seasons called förkvalserien), in which all the teams played each other home-and-away. The winner, Örebro HK advanced to the qualifiers to Elitserien, which was renamed the SHL prior to the following season.

The teams started the playoffs with points based on their performance in the regular season. 7th-place IK Oskarshamn started with one point, 6th-place Örebro HK with two, 5th-place Djurgårdens IF with three, and 4th-place BIK Karlskoga with four.

Pos	Team	Pld	W	OTW	OTL	L	GF	GA	GD	Pts	Qualification
1	Örebro HK	6	4	0	1	1	23	16	+7	15	Advance to Elitserien qualifiers
2	BIK Karlskoga	6	3	0	0	3	19	22	−3	13	Return to HockeyAllsvenskan for the 2013–14 season
3	Djurgårdens IF	6	2	1	0	3	22	20	+2	11	Return to HockeyAllsvenskan for the 2013–14 season
4	IK Oskarshamn	6	2	0	0	4	20	26	−6	7	Return to HockeyAllsvenskan for the 2013–14 season

=== Elitserien qualifiers ===
The 2013 Elitserien qualifiers (Swedish: Kvalserien) determined which teams would participate in the 2013–14 season of Elitserien (which would be renamed the SHL during the 2013 offseason). The two teams with the worst records from the 2012–13 Elitserien season (Timrå IK and Rögle BK), along with the three best teams from the 2012–13 HockeyAllsvenskan season (Leksands IF, Södertälje SK, and VIK Västerås HK) and the winner of the HockeyAllsvenskan playoff series (Örebro HK) all played each other twice, once home and once way. Örebro and Leksand finished first and second, and were thus promoted to what would become the SHL. Timrå and Rögle were therefore relegated and would play in the 2013–14 HockeyAllsvenskan season.

2013 Kvalserien		GP	W	T	L	OTW/SOW	OTL/SOL	GF	GA	DIF	PTS
1	Örebro HK	10	6	4	0	2	2	29	16	+13	24
2	Leksands IF	10	7	1	2	0	1	36	19	+17	22
3	Timrå IK	10	4	3	3	2	1	30	30	0	17
4	VIK Västerås HK	10	3	2	5	1	1	19	23	–4	12
5	Rögle BK	10	2	1	7	1	0	18	27	–9	8
6	Södertälje SK	10	2	1	7	0	1	16	33	–17	7

Legend: Qualified for the 2013–14 SHL season; Play in the 2013–14 HockeyAllsvenskan season

== HockeyAllsvenskan qualifiers ==
The two teams ranked 13th and 14th after the regular season, Tingsryds AIF and Karlskrona HK, were forced to play in the Kvalserien qualification series to defend their spots in HockeyAllsvenskan. They played a double round-robin tournament against the four playoff winners from third-tier Division 1 (IF Björklöven, HC Vita Hästen, Huddinge IK, and Piteå HC). The series began on 12 March 2013 and ended on 5 April 2013.

Umeå-based IF Björklöven, who were Swedish champions in 1987 and were in Sweden's top hockey league as recently as 2001, finished first in the standings, resulting in their return to HockeyAllsvenskan three years after their 2010 demotion to Division 1 due to financial difficulties.

The second and final spot in HockeyAllsvenskan was decided dramatically in the final round. Karlskrona went into the final round one point ahead of Tingsryd in the standings. Each team ended up losing their final match in game winning shots, resulting in Tingsryd being demoted to the 2013–14 Division 1 season.

Pos	Team	Pld	W	OTW	OTL	L	GF	GA	GD	Pts	Qualification
1	IF Björklöven (P)	10	7	0	0	3	26	19	+7	21	Qualified for HockeyAllsvenskan for the 2013–14 season
2	Karlskrona HK	10	5	1	1	3	31	27	+4	18	Qualified for HockeyAllsvenskan for the 2013–14 season
3	Tingsryds AIF (R)	10	4	1	3	2	29	26	+3	17	Qualified for Division 1 for the 2013–14 season
4	HC Vita Hästen	10	4	1	1	4	31	28	+3	15	Qualified for Division 1 for the 2013–14 season
5	Huddinge IK	10	2	2	0	6	28	32	−4	10	Qualified for Division 1 for the 2013–14 season
6	Piteå HC	10	2	1	1	6	19	32	−13	9	Qualified for Division 1 for the 2013–14 season

(P) Promoted; (R) Relegated

Game log
Round 1:

March 12, 2013; 19:00	Tingsryds AIF	3 – 1 (1–1, 1–0, 1–0)	HC Vita Hästen	Nelson Garden Arena, Tingsryd; Attendance: 1660

Game reference
4 min	Penalties	10 min
21	Shots	32

March 12, 2013; 19:00	Karlskrona HK	2 – 1 (0-0, 1-0, 1-1)	Huddinge IK	Telenor Arena, Karlskrona; Attendance: 2629

Game reference
6 min	Penalties	8 min
33	Shots	31

March 12, 2013; 19:00	Piteå HC	1 – 3 (0-0, 1-1, 0-2)	IF Björklöven	LF Arena, Piteå; Attendance: 1407

Game reference
6 min	Penalties	8 min
20	Shots	24

Round 2:

March 14, 2013; 19:00	IF Björklöven	4 – 1 (2-0, 0-0, 2-1)	Karlskrona HK	Umeå Arena, Umeå; Attendance: 4052

Game reference
10 min	Penalties	12 min
36	Shots	23

March 14, 2013; 19:00	Huddinge IK	3 – 2 (OT) (1–1, 1–1, 0–0, 1–0)	Tingsryds AIF	Björkängshallen, Huddinge; Attendance: 545

Game reference
4 min	Penalties	6 min
30	Shots	32

March 14, 2013; 19:00	HC Vita Hästen	3 – 4 (GWS) (2-1, 0-1, 1-1, 0-0, 0-1)	Piteå HC	Himmelstalundshallen, Norrköping; Attendance: 1982

Game reference
12 min	Penalties	10 min
49	Shots	23

Round 3:

March 16, 2013; 16:00	Tingsryds AIF	1 – 0 (1-0, 0-0, 0-0)	IF Björklöven	Nelson Garden Arena, Tingsryd; Attendance: 2143

Game reference
18 min	Penalties	8 min
20	Shots	33

March 16, 2013; 16:00	Karlskrona HK	3 – 0 (2-0, 1-0, 0-0)	Piteå HC	Telenor Arena, Karlskrona; Attendance: 2846

Game reference
18 min	Penalties	12 min
25	Shots	23

March 17, 2013; 16:00	Huddinge IK	2 – 5 (2-1, 0-0, 0-4)	HC Vita Hästen	Björkängshallen, Huddinge; Attendance: 897

Game reference
8 min	Penalties	8 min
20	Shots	39

Round 4:

March 20, 2013; 19:00	Piteå HC	2 – 3 (OT) (1-0, 1-2, 0-0, 0-1)	Tingsryds AIF	LF Arena, Piteå; Attendance: 1134

Game reference
8 min	Penalties	10 min
34	Shots	25

March 20, 2013; 19:00	IF Björklöven	4 – 2 (1–1, 1–0, 2–1)	Huddinge IK	Umeå Arena, Umeå; Attendance: 3964

Game reference
2 min	Penalties	4 min
44	Shots	31

March 20, 2013; 19:00	HC Vita Hästen	4 – 0 (1-0, 3-0, 0-0)	Karlskrona HK	Himmelstalundshallen, Norrköping; Attendance: 2286

Game reference
18 min	Penalties	20 min
32	Shots	36

Round 5:

March 22, 2013; 19:00	Tingsryds AIF	5 – 1 (2-0, 3-0, 0-1)	Karlskrona HK	Nelson Garden Arena, Tingsryd; Attendance: 2769

Game reference
12 min	Penalties	8 min
21	Shots	30

March 22, 2013; 19:00	HC Vita Hästen	5 – 1 (1-0, 1-0, 3-1)	IF Björklöven	Himmelstalundshallen, Norrköping; Attendance: 3714

Game reference
14 min	Penalties	10 min
30	Shots	28

March 22, 2013; 19:00	Huddinge IK	5 – 1 (1-0, 4-0, 0-1)	Piteå HC	Björkängshallen, Huddinge; Attendance: 205

Game reference
10 min	Penalties	35 min
33	Shots	27

Round 6:

March 25, 2013; 19:00	Karlskrona HK	6 – 5 (GWS) (2-1, 0-1, 3-3, 0-0, 1-0)	Tingsryds AIF	Telenor Arena, Karlskrona; Attendance: 3139

Game reference
43 min	Penalties	12 min
34	Shots	23

March 25, 2013; 19:00	Piteå HC	3 – 5 (2-0, 0-3, 1-2)	Huddinge IK	LF Arena, Piteå; Attendance: 826

Game reference
4 min	Penalties	10 min
37	Shots	25

March 25, 2013; 19:00	IF Björklöven	3 – 2 (0-1, 2-1, 1-0)	HC Vita Hästen	Umeå Arena, Umeå; Attendance: 4379

Game reference
4 min	Penalties	10 min
36	Shots	22

Round 7:

March 27, 2013; 19:00	Tingsryds AIF	0 – 3 (0–1, 0–1, 0–1)	Piteå HC	Nelson Garden Arena, Tingsryd; Attendance: 1712

Game reference
18 min	Penalties	8 min
46	Shots	32

March 27, 2013; 19:00	Karlskrona HK	7 – 3 (2-1, 3-0, 2-2)	HC Vita Hästen	Telenor Arena, Karlskrona; Attendance: 2738

Game reference
8 min	Penalties	8 min
33	Shots	24

March 27, 2013; 19:00	Huddinge IK	1 – 2 (0-0, 0-1, 1-1)	IF Björklöven	Björkängshallen, Huddinge; Attendance: 1432

Game reference
4 min	Penalties	8 min
24	Shots	31

Round 8:

March 31, 2013; 16:00	Piteå HC	1 – 5 (0-1, 0-2, 1-2)	Karlskrona HK	LF Arena, Piteå; Attendance: 371

Game reference
4 min	Penalties	10 min
32	Shots	23

March 31, 2013; 16:00	IF Björklöven	5 – 2 (1-0, 2-0, 2-2)	Tingsryds AIF	Umeå Arena, Umeå; Attendance: 5336

Game reference
31 min	Penalties	16 min
25	Shots	23

March 31, 2013; 16:00	HC Vita Hästen	4 – 3 (2-0, 0-1, 2-2)	Huddinge IK	Himmelstalundshallen, Norrköping; Attendance: 2537

Game reference
6 min	Penalties	8 min
45	Shots	27

Round 9:

April 3, 2013; 19:00	Tingsryds AIF	7 – 3 (0-0, 2-2, 5-1)	Huddinge IK	Nelson Garden Arena, Tingsryd; Attendance: 1515

Game reference
8 min	Penalties	6 min
42	Shots	30

April 3, 2013; 19:00	Karlskrona HK	4 – 1 (1-0, 2-0, 1-1)	IF Björklöven	Telenor Arena, Karlskrona; Attendance: 3375

Game reference
6 min	Penalties	4 min
21	Shots	22

April 3, 2013; 19:00	Piteå HC	4 – 2 (2-1, 1-1, 1-0)	HC Vita Hästen	LF Arena, Piteå; Attendance: 337

Game reference
20 min	Penalties	8 min
36	Shots	34

Round 10:

April 5, 2013; 19:00	IF Björklöven	3 – 0 (1-0, 2-0, 0-0)	Piteå HC	Umeå Arena, Umeå; Attendance: 6002

Game reference
8 min	Penalties	18 min
26	Shots	22

April 5, 2013; 19:00	Huddinge IK	3 – 2 (GWS) (1-1, 1-0, 0-1, 0-0, 1-0)	Karlskrona HK	Björkängshallen, Huddinge; Attendance: 578

Game reference
2 min	Penalties	2 min
32	Shots	29

April 5, 2013; 19:00	HC Vita Hästen	2 – 1 (GWS) (1–1, 0–0, 0–0, 0–0, 1–0)	Tingsryds AIF	Himmelstalundshallen, Norrköping; Attendance: 1056

Game reference
10 min	Penalties	4 min
32	Shots	28
