= Asplöven HC =

Swedish ice hockey club

- City: Haparanda, Sweden
- League: Hockeyettan
- Founded: April 14, 1972
- Folded: 2019
- Home arena: Arena Polarica (capacity 1500)
- General manager: (Sweden) Per Kenttä
- Head coach: (Sweden) Per Kenttä
- Website: asploven.com

Asplöven HC was an ice hockey club from Haparanda, Sweden, they last played in Sweden's third tier league Hockeyettan. They played their home games at the Arena Polarica, which seats 1500 spectators. Asplöven used to play in the Swedish 2nd level of ice hockey, HockeyAllsvenskan.

== History ==
Asplöven HC were founded on 14 April 1972. Asplöven were promoted to HockeyAllsvenskan for the 2012–13 season, after Borås HC was relegated due to that club's financial troubles.

=== Season-by-season ===
List of Asplöven HC seasons
Season	Level	Division	Record		Avg. home atnd.	Notes	Ref.
Season	Level	Division	Position	W-T-L W-OT-L	Avg. home atnd.	Notes	Ref.
2008–09	Tier 3	Division 1A	1st	16–4–2–2	385		
2008–09	Tier 3	Allettan North	1st	6–2–0–2	570	Bye to 3rd round of playoffs	
2008–09	Tier 3	Playoff to HA qualifier	Round 3	2–1	613	vs Piteå HC	
2008–09	HockeyAllsvenskan qualifier		5th	3–1–0–6	373		
2009–10	Tier 3	Division 1A	1st	16–1–1–3	367		
2009–10	Tier 3	Allettan North	2nd	9–1–2–2	418	Bye to 2nd round of playoffs	
2009–10	Tier 3	Playoff to HA playoffs	Round 2 Round 3	2–1; 1–2	537	vs Piteå HC vs Enköpings HK	
2010–11	Tier 3	Division 1A	2nd	15–2–3–4	356		
2010–11	Tier 3	Allettan North	1st	11–1–0–2	463	Bye to 3rd round of playoffs	
2010–11	Tier 3	Playoff to HA qualifier	Round 3	2–0	900	vs IF Björklöven	
2010–11	HockeyAllsvenskan qualifier		5th	1–1–2–6	487		
2011–12	Tier 3	Division 1A	2nd	13–2–1–5	281		
2011–12	Tier 3	Allettan North	2nd	8–2–1–3	450	Bye to 3rd round of playoffs	
2011–12	Tier 3	Playoff to HA qualifier	Round 2 Round 3	2–1; 2–1	481	vs Huddinge IK vs Kiruna IF	
2011–12	HockeyAllsvenskan qualifier		3rd	5–0–1–4	622	▲ Promoted to HockeyAllsvenskan (after 2nd place Borås HC was relegated on financial grounds)	
2012–13	Tier 2	HockeyAllsvenskan	11th	17–4–4–27	1,432		
2013–14	Tier 2	HockeyAllsvenskan	11th	18–6–3–25	1,394		
