= Vimmerby HC =

- City: Vimmerby, Sweden
- League: HockeyAllsvenskan
- Founded: 1993
- Home arena: VBO Arena
- Colors: Black, yellow
- Website: vimmerbyhc.se

Vimmerby HC (often referred to as Vimmerby Hockey) is a Swedish ice hockey club based in Vimmerby, of the HockeyAllsvenskan (Allsv).

Vimmerby was originally promoted to Hockeyettan (Division 1), the third tier of ice hockey in Sweden, in 2011. Vimmberby remained in the Hockeyettan, until gaining promotion to the second tier Allsvenskan for the 2024–25 season. Vimmerby retained their position in the Allsvenskan after defeating Tingsryds AIF in a series deciding game seven victory in the play-outs.
