= Nynäshamns IF =

Swedish football club

- Full name: Nynäshamns idrottsförening
- Sport: soccer, ice hockey, skiing, varpa bandy (earlier), handball (inactive)
- Founded: 4 February 1917
- Based in: Nynäshamn, Sweden
- Ballpark: Kvarnängens IP

Nynäshamns IF is a sports club in Nynäshamn, Sweden, established on 4 February 1917. It became an alliance club on 1 January 1989. The men's bandy team played in the Swedish top division during the season of 1971–1972.

The men's soccer team played in the Swedish second division during the seasons of 1939–1940 and 1940–1941.
