= IFK Ore =

- City: Furudal, Sweden
- League: (Sweden) Division 1
- Division: 1C
- Founded: 1937
- Home arena: Furudals Center
- Colors: Blue, orange
- Website: www.orehockey.se/

IFK Ore is a Swedish ice hockey club, named after Oresjön, the lake on which the club's home town of Furudal is situated. The club plays in group C of Sweden's third tier league, Division 1, as of the 2013–14 season.
