= Mariestad BoIS HC =

- City: Mariestad, Sweden
- League: Division 1
- Founded: 1947
- Home arena: Katrinhallen
- General manager: (Sweden) Peter Lennartsson
- Head coach: (Sweden) Andreas Appelgren

Franchise history
- 1967–1998: Mariestads BoIS
- 1998–present: Mariestads BoIS HC

Previous franchise history
- 1947–1967: Mariestad CK Hockey

Mariestad BoIS HC is an ice hockey club from Mariestad, Sweden founded in 1947. They are currently playing in the third highest league in Sweden, Division 1.
