= Mjölby HC =

- City: Mjölby, Sweden
- League: (Sweden) Division 1 as of the 2013–14 season
- Division: 1E
- Home arena: Toyota Material Handling Arena
- Colors: Black, red, white
- Website: www.mjolbyhockey.com

Mjölby HC is a Swedish ice hockey club which has been playing in Division 1, the third tier of ice hockey in Sweden, since the 2008–09 season.
