= Piteå HC =

Piteå HC Piteå Hockey Club
- City: Piteå, Sweden
- League: (Sweden) Division 1
- Division: Norra
- Founded: 1986
- Home arena: LF Arena
- Colors: Red, black, white
- Owner(s): Bella
- General manager: Fredde Lindgren
- Website: www.piteahockey.se

Franchise history
- –1986: Piteå IF; Munksund/Skuthamns SK; Öjebyns IF; Storfors AIK
- 1986–present: Piteå HC

Piteå Hockey Club, usually abbreviated Piteå HC, is a Swedish ice hockey club based in Piteå in Norrbotten, Sweden's northernmost county. The club played six seasons, from 1999 to 2005, in Sweden's second-tier league, Allsvenskan. As of the 2013–14 season, the team competes in the "Norra" (north) group of Division 1, the third tier of ice hockey in Sweden.

Piteå HC was founded in 1986 as a merger of the hockey sections of Piteå IF, Munksund/Skuthamns SK, and Öjebyns IF.

== Season-by-season ==
This list includes only recent Piteå HC seasons.

Year	Level	Division	Record		Notes
Year	Level	Division	Position	W-T-L W-OT-L	Notes
2008–09	Tier 3	Division 1A	3rd	16–1–4–3	
2008–09	Tier 3	Allettan Norra	2nd	7–0–1–2	Bye to 2nd round
2008–09	Tier 3	Division 1 playoffs	–	3–2	Eliminated in 3rd round
2009–10	Tier 3	Division 1A	2nd	15–1–2–3	
2009–10	Tier 3	Allettan Norra	4th	7–1–2–4	
2009–10	Tier 3	Division 1 playoffs	–	3–2	Eliminated in 2nd round
2010–11	Tier 3	Division 1A	4th	15–1–0–8	
2010–11	Tier 3	Allettan Norra	5th	4–1–1–8	
2011–12	Tier 3	Division 1A	4th	6–3–4–8	
2011–12	Tier 3	Allettan Norra	5th	5–2–2–5	
2012–13	Tier 3	Division 1A	3rd	15–1–0–8	
2012–13	Tier 3	Allettan Norra	3rd	8–1–2–3	
2012–13	Tier 3	Division 1 playoffs	–	6–1	
2012–13	2013 HockeyAllsvenskan qualifier		6th	2–1–1–6	
2013–14	Tier 3	Division 1 Norra	TBD	TBD	
