= Tingsryds AIF =

- City: Tingsryd, Sweden
- League: HockeyEttan
- Founded: 1923
- Home arena: Dackehallen
- Colors: Green, white
- Website: taif.nu

Tingsryds Allmänna Idrottsförening, commonly known as Tingsryds AIF, (sometimes abbreviated TAIF) is an ice hockey club based in Tingsryd, Sweden. The club is playing in HockeyEttan, the third tier of ice hockey in Sweden as of the 2025–26 season. The club was founded in 1923 and played seven seasons in Division I when it was Sweden's highest-level hockey league.

Tingsryd plays their home matches at Nelson Garden Arena (formerly known as Dackehallen), which has a capacity of 3,400 spectators.

== Recent seasons ==
Year	Level	Division	Record		Avg. home atnd.	Notes
Year	Level	Division	Position	W-T-L W-OT-L	Avg. home atnd.	Notes
2008–09	Tier 3	Division 1F	1st	17–5–0–5	1,396	
2008–09	Tier 3	Allettan Södra	1st	9–4–0–1	1,796	
2008–09	Tier 3	Division 1 playoffs	–	2–0	2,651	
2008–09	2009 HockeyAllsvenskan qualifier		2nd	6–1–0–3	2,801	
2009–10	Tier 3	Division 1F	1st	23–2–2–0	1,872	
2009–10	Tier 3	Allettan Södra	1st	10–0–2–2	2,197	
2009–10	Tier 3	Division 1 playoffs	–	2–1	2,795	
2009–10	2010 HockeyAllsvenskan qualifier		2nd	7–0–0–3	3,004	▲ Promoted to HockeyAllsvenskan
2010–11	Tier 2	HockeyAllsvenskan	14th	10–7–5–30	2,346	
2010–11	2011 HockeyAllsvenskan qualifier		2nd	5–1–2–2	2,320	
2011–12	Tier 2	HockeyAllsvenskan	12th	15–4–5–28	2,137	
2012–13	Tier 2	HockeyAllsvenskan	13th	14–4–6–28	2,092	
2012–13	2013 HockeyAllsvenskan qualifier		3rd	4–1–3–2	1,960	▼ Relegated to Division 1
2013–14	Tier 3	Division 1F	TBD	TBD	TBD	
