= Botkyrka HC =

- City: Tumba, Sweden
- League: Division 1 (at the time of merge)
- Founded: 1998
- Home arena: Ishuset, Tumba
- Colours: Black, yellow
- Website: http://www.tumbahockey.se

Franchise history
- 1998–2000: Tumba/Botkyrka Hockey
- 2000–2013: Botkyrka HC
- 2013–present: IFK Tumba Hockey

Botkyrka HC was a Swedish ice hockey team. Their home arena was Ishuset in Tumba, just outside Botkyrka in the Stockholm suburbs.

== History ==
The club was founded in 1998 as a merger between IFK Tumba and Botkyrka IF, taking Tumba's spot in Division 1.

From 2002 to 2004, they qualified for the promotion round to Allsvenskan, but they failed to be promoted all three times.

In August 2013, Botkyrka HC merged with IFK Tumba Hockey, giving IFK Tumba a senior ice hockey team. IFK Tumba IK took Botkyrka HC's spot in Division 1.
