= Valbo HC =

- City: Valbo, Sweden
- League: Swedish Division 2
- Founded: 2007
- Home arena: Borr & Tång Arena

Franchise history
- before 2007: Valbo AIF
- 2007-present: Valbo HC

Valbo HC is an ice hockey team in Valbo, Sweden. They play in the Swedish Division 2, the fourth level of ice hockey in Sweden. Their home arena is the Nickback, which opened in 1999.

== History ==
The club was founded in 2007 when the ice hockey section became independent from Valbo AIF.

Valbo had previously played in the third-level Division 1, but were relegated to Division 2 following the 2012-13 Division 1 season.
