= IFK Arboga IK =

- City: Arboga, Västmanland County, Sweden
- Division: Division 2
- Founded: 1897; 129 years ago
- Home arena: Sparbanken Arena
- Colours: White, blue, yellow, black
- Website: www.arbogahockey.se

IFK Arboga IK is an ice-hockey club from Arboga in Sweden. The team is currently playing in the fourth league level in Sweden, Division 2.
