= Olofström =

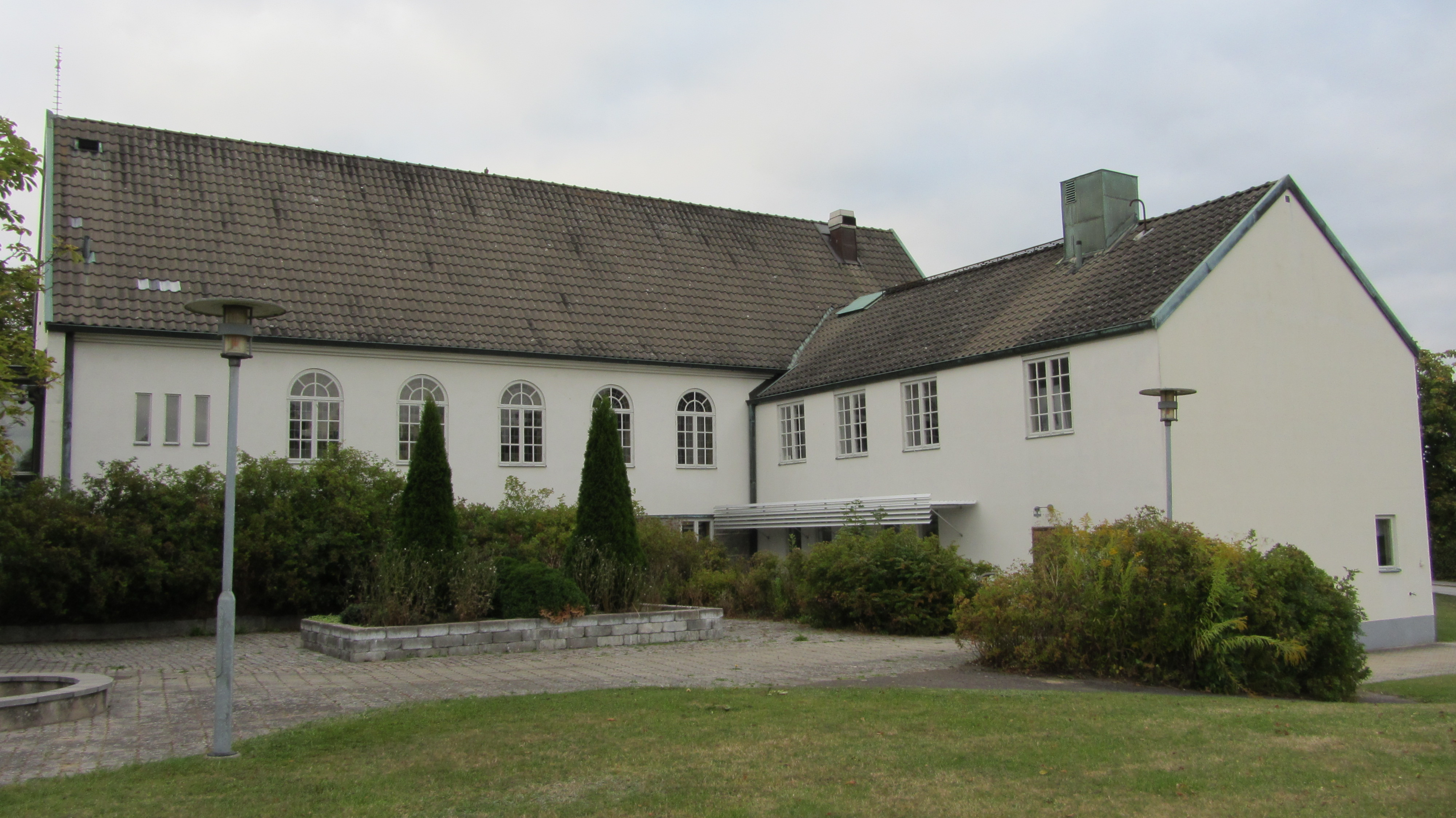
- Olofström Church

- Flag Coat of arms

- Location within Blekinge Location within Sweden
- Coordinates: 56°16′N 14°32′E
- Country: Sweden
- Province: Blekinge
- County: Blekinge County
- Municipality: Olofström Municipality

Area
  - Total: 7.04 km^{2} (2.72 sq mi)

Population (31 December 2010)
  - Total: 7,327
  - Density: 1,040/km^{2} (2,700/sq mi)
- Time zone: UTC+1 (CET)
  - Summer (DST): UTC+2 (CEST)

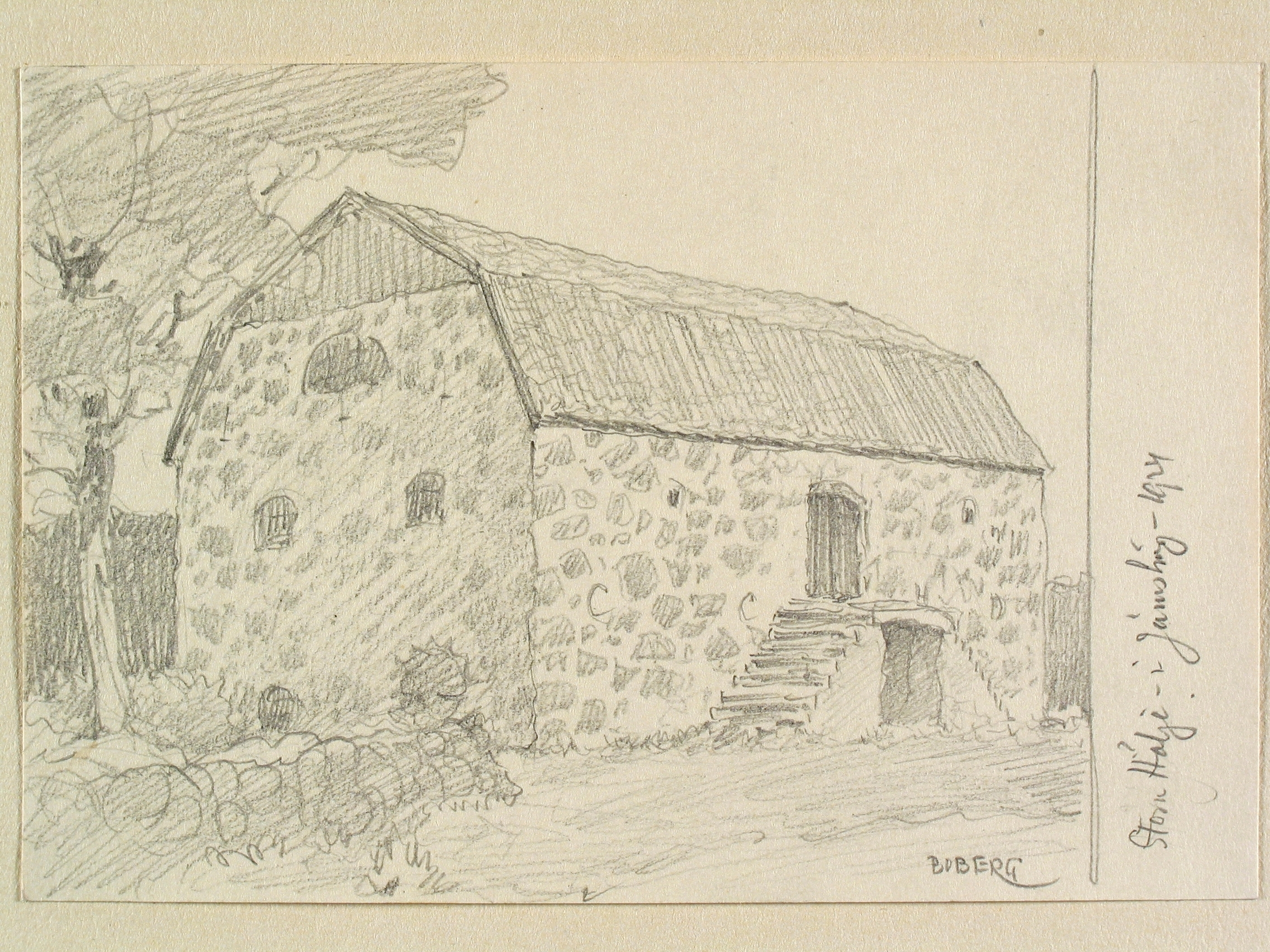
Farm building in Olofström, now a museum. Drawn by Ferdinand Boberg in 1924.

Olofström, previously Holje by, is a locality in Blekinge County, Sweden with 7,327 inhabitants in 2010. in 1967, the market town of Olofström was merged with the villages Kyrkhult and Jämshög to create Olofström Municipality. Olofström is the seat of Olofström Municipality. The increased use of cars in the 1950s and 1960s was the great boost for the municipality. Today the automobile industry, dominated by Volvo Cars, is the largest employer in Olofström.

== Geography ==
Immediately west of Olofström lies Halen, a nature reserve covering 809 hectares (2,000 acres) of land and water, making it one of the largest protected areas in Blekinge. It was established in 1972 for its recreational value and it has since been expanded. It features hiking trails, rest areas, and accessibility-adapted facilities, including a trail around the small lake Blåsegylet. The lake Halen, which is partly included in the reserve, is popular for swimming and canoeing and is connected to a larger lake system. The area is also rich in biodiversity, with old-growth forests and habitats for a variety of bird species, including ospreys and loons.

Both the Skåneleden and Blekingeleden hiking trails traverse the nature reserve and the surrounding nature, connecting Olofström to Kyrkhult in the north, Näsum and Sölvesborg to the south, and Osby to the west.

== Olofström Church ==
Olofström church (Olofströms kyrka) belongs to Jämshög's parish in the Diocese of Lund. The original building is a chapel built in 1933. A rebuild was completed in 1962 under the guidance of architects Hanna and Roy Victorson in Karlshamn. The entrance hall and the parish hall's northwest wing were built in 1986 under the direction of architectural firm K.E. Dudzik.

== Education ==
The gymnasium, Nordenbergsskolan, accommodates one of the few orienteering schools in Sweden, as well as the only archery school in Sweden.

== Sports ==
Olofström is home to football club Olofströms IF, floorball club Olofströms IBK and ice hockey club Olofströms IK.

== Natives from Olofström ==
- Calle Clang (born 2002), professional ice hockey goaltender
- Jan Gunnarsson (born 1962), professional tennis player
- Katherine Haataja (born 1969), mezzo-soprano
- Magnus Larsson (born 1970), professional tennis player
- André Petersson (born 1990), professional ice hockey player

== See also ==
- Volvo Cars
