= Bengt Nordenberg =

Swedish painter (1822–1902)

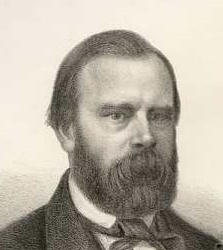
- Born: Bengt Nordenberg; 22 April 1822; Jämshög, Blekinge, Sweden
- Died: 18 December 1902 (aged 80); Düsseldorf, Germany
- Education: Royal Swedish Academy of Arts and Kunstakademie Düsseldorf
- Known for: Painting
- Movement: Düsseldorf school of painting

Bengt Nordenberg (April 22, 1822 – December 18, 1902) was a Swedish artist. He belonged to the Düsseldorf school of painting and is best known for his genre paintings with everyday life scenes from the Dalarna, Skåne and Blekinge areas of Sweden. He moved to Düsseldorf in the 1850s.

== Biography ==
Nordenberg was born at Jämshög in Blekinge County, Sweden. He was one of nine siblings born to Per Jönsson Nord (1785-1854) and his wife Sissa Bengtsdotter (b. 1792). He grew up in poverty and became an apprentice to a painter in Sölvesborg.

In 1843 he fulfilled his wish to come to Stockholm and study at the Royal Swedish Academy of Arts. In the autumn of 1851, he went to the Düsseldorf Academy, where first Theodor Hildebrandt and then later, Adolph Tidemand became his teachers. In particular, the latter had a big influence on Nordenberg's painting style and subject matter. For some time he worked as an assistant to Tidemand, making reproductions of his paintings. Nordenberg also painted pictures of middle-class and upper-class life, and also religious paintings and altarpieces. He painted altarpieces in several Småland churches, including at Stenbrohult in Älmhult and Gårdsby in Växjö.

In 1856, Nordenberg received a travel grant from the Swedish state. He studied with French history painter Thomas Couture (1815–1879) for one and a half years, made a short stop in Düsseldorf, and in the autumn of 1858 he went to Rome. He returned soon to Düsseldorf, where he settled for life. From 1856 to 1889 he was a member of Malkasten, an artists' association there. He also gave private lessons to Swedish artists including Peter Eskilsson (1820-1872), Augusta Jensen (1858-1936) and his nephew Henrik Nordenberg (1857-1928).

== Personal life ==
In 1855, Nordenberg married Nanny Maria Charlotta Sutthof (1831-1905).

== Gallery ==
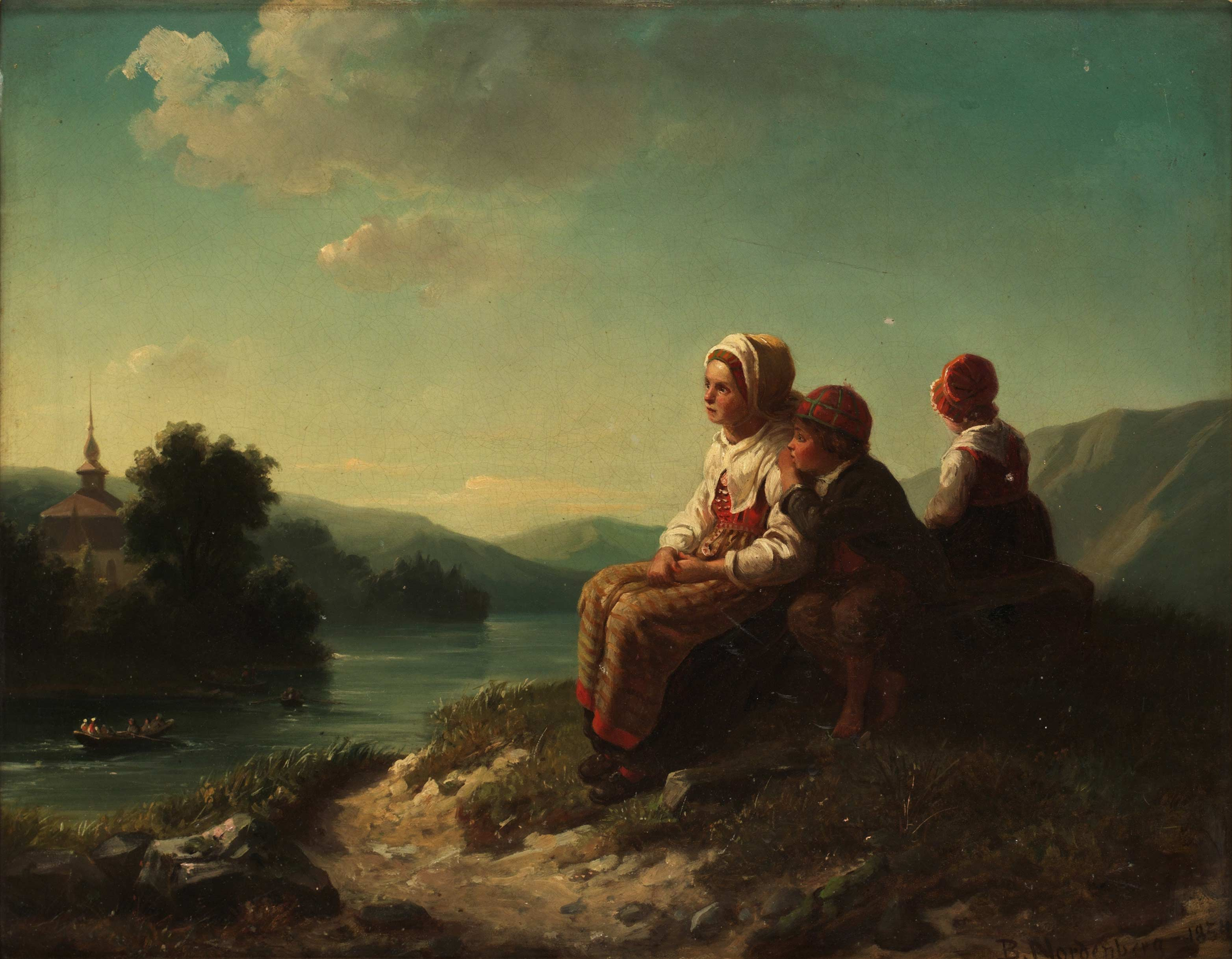
Rowing to the Church, Dalarna (1854)

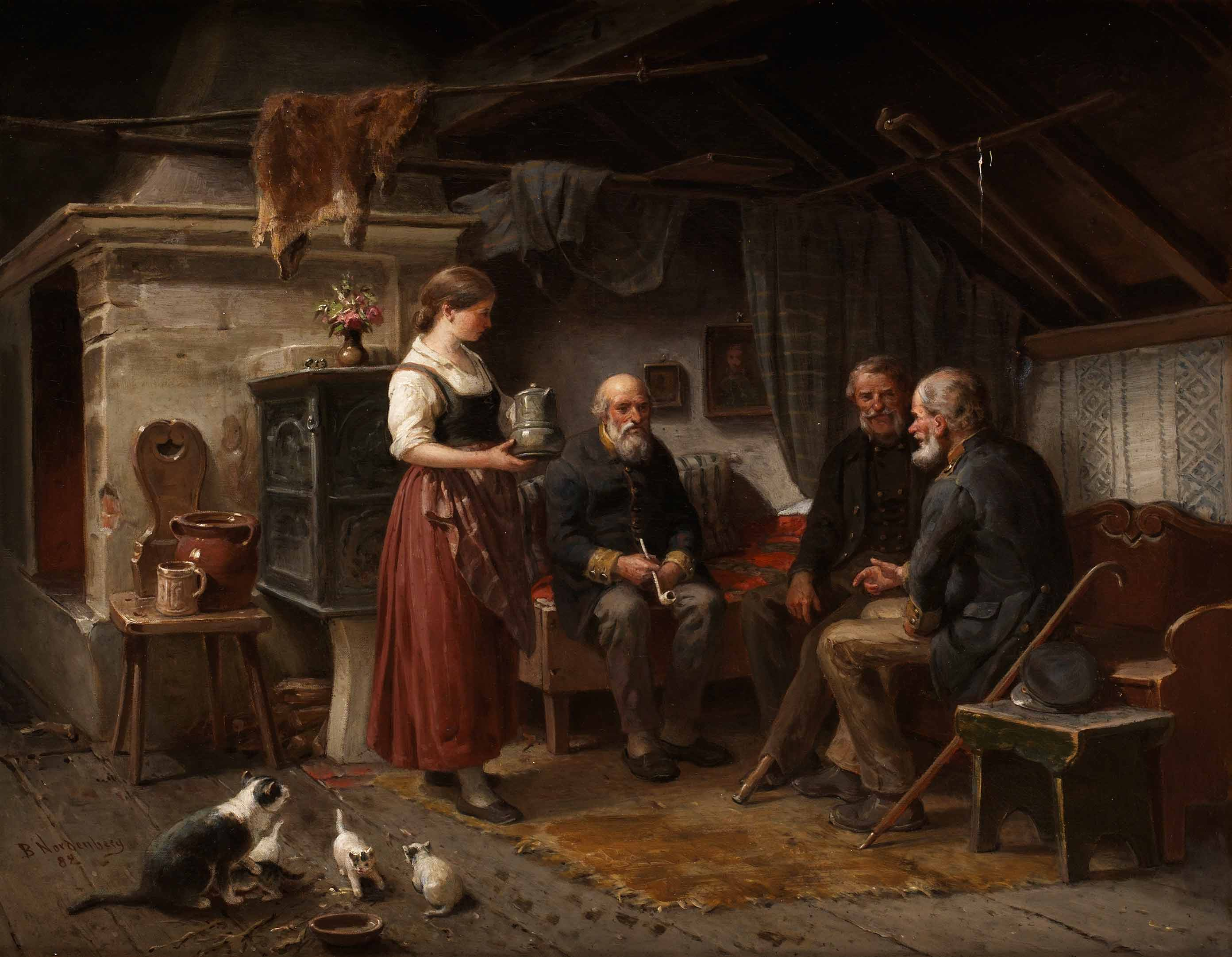
The Veterans (1882)

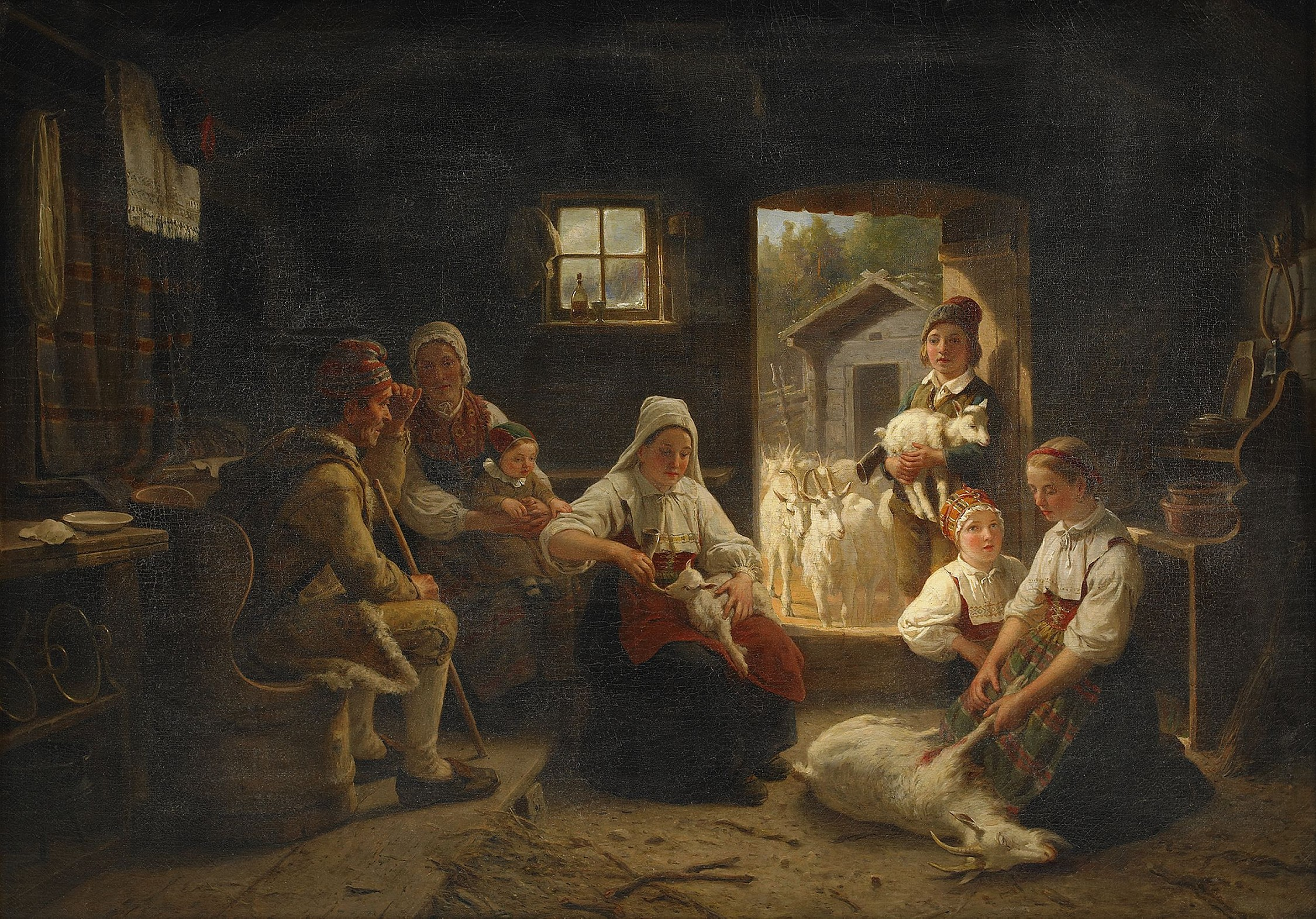
A Torn Goat

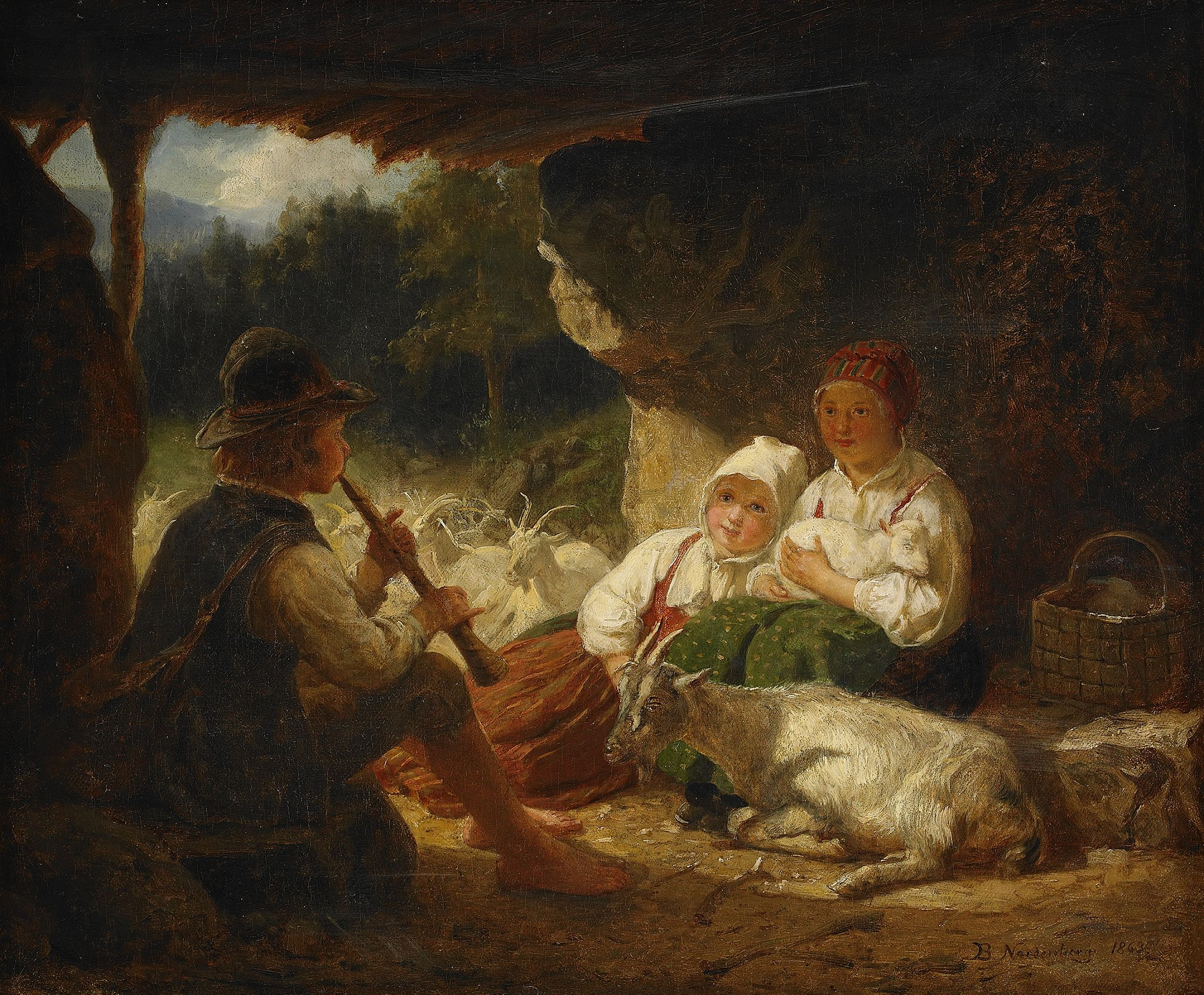
Sheppard Family with Goats (1863)

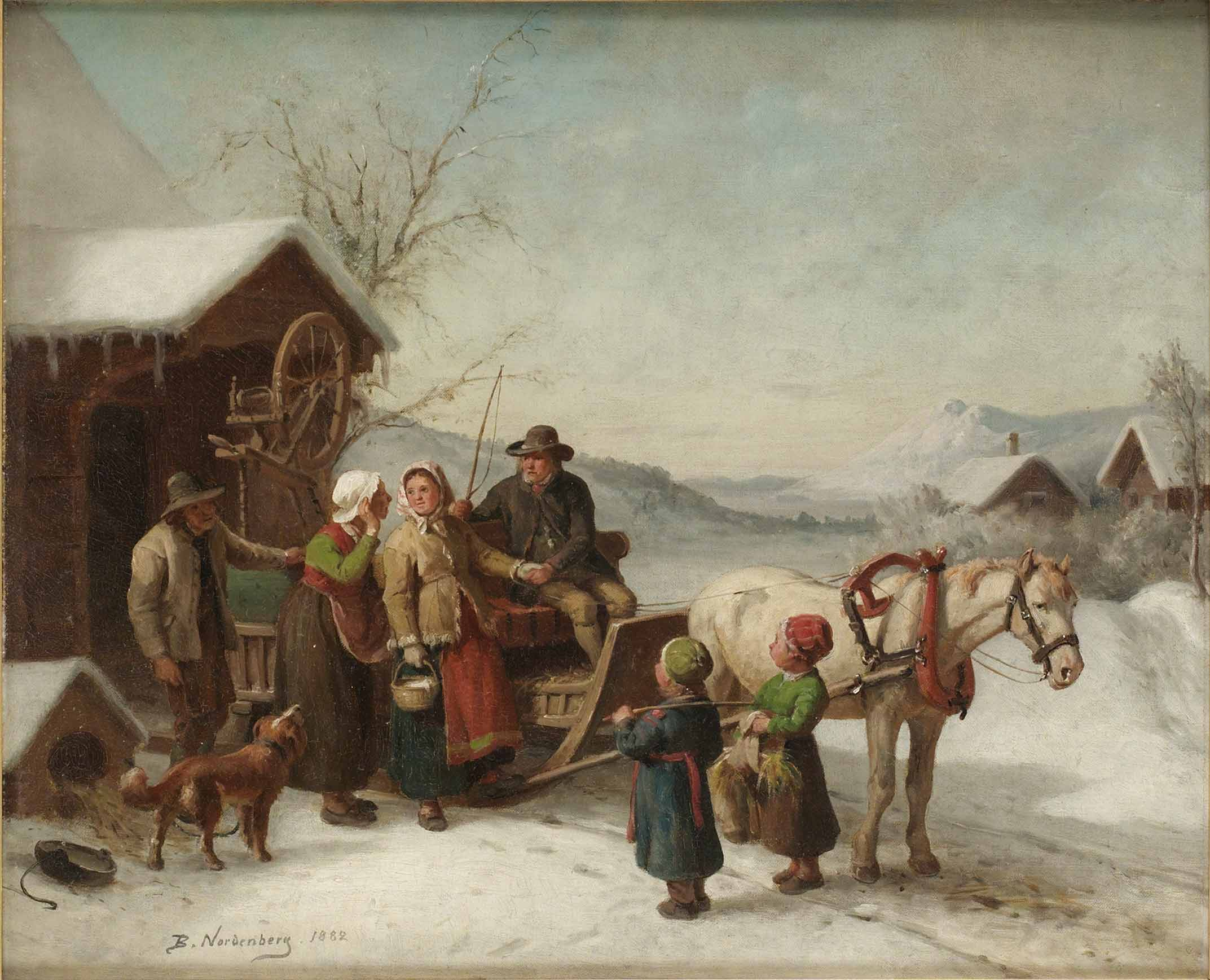
Winter Travel (1882)

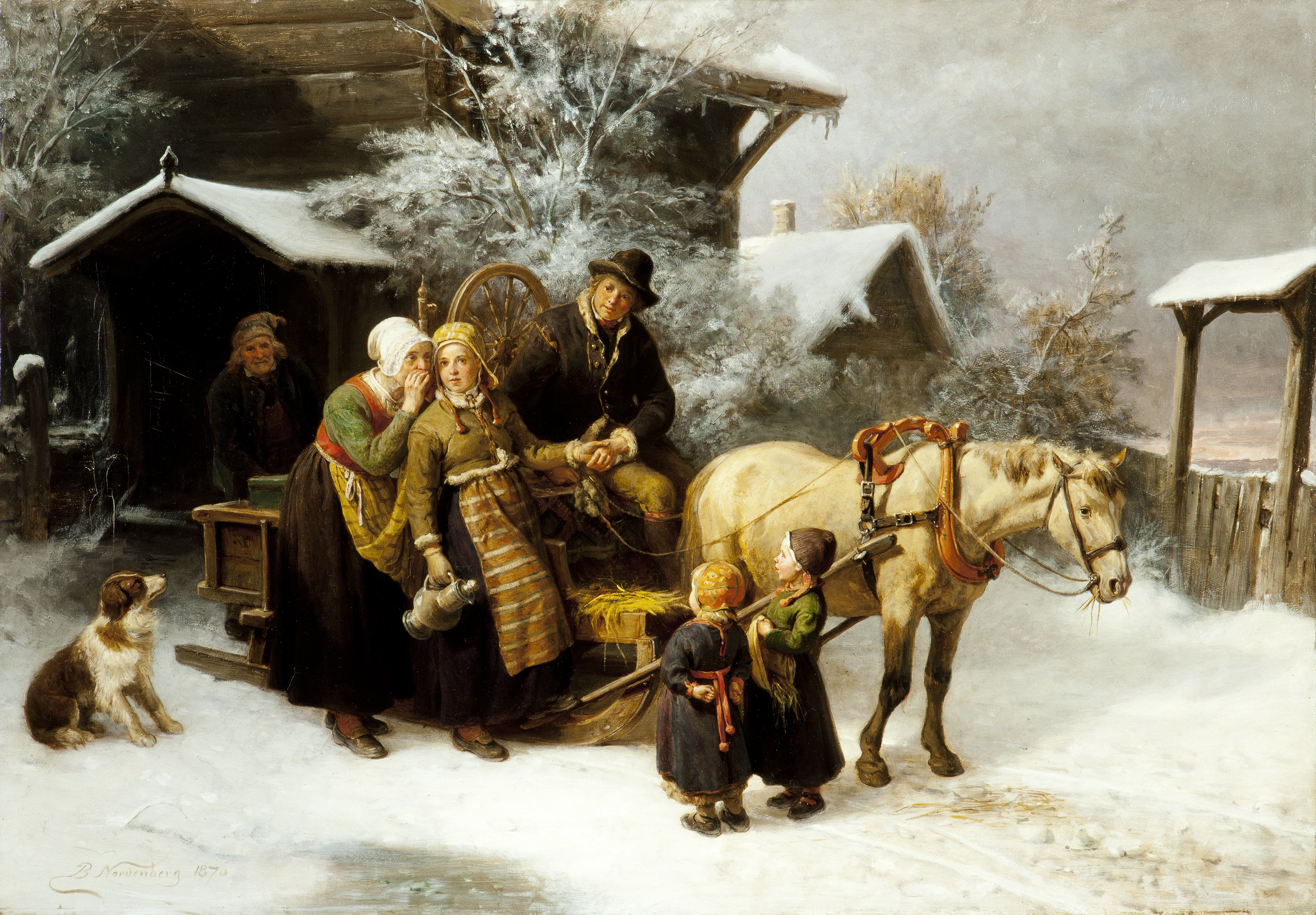
Leaving home (1876)

== Other sources ==
- Ann-Marie Elmqvist (1994) Bengt Nordenberg: folklivsmålaren (A.-M. Elmqvist) ISBN 9789162813598
