= Hammarslund =

- Location within Skåne Location within Sweden
- Coordinates: 56°00′N 14°13′E
- Country: Sweden
- Province: Skåne
- County: Skåne County
- Municipality: Kristianstad Municipality

Area
  - Total: 0.29 km^{2} (0.11 sq mi)

Population (31 December 2010)
  - Total: 461
  - Density: 1,573/km^{2} (4,070/sq mi)
- Time zone: UTC+1 (CET)
  - Summer (DST): UTC+2 (CEST)

Hammarslund is a locality situated in Kristianstad Municipality, Skåne County, Sweden with 461 inhabitants in 2010.
