= Eskilsson =

Eskilsson is a surname. Notable people with the surname include:

- Bengta Eskilsson (1836–1923), pioneering Swedish textile artist
- Christofer Eskilsson (born 1989), Swedish diver
- Erik Eskilsson, Sami man accused in the Arjeplog blasphemy trial of 1687
- Gustav Eskilsson (born 1992), Swedish curler
- Hans Eskilsson (born 1966), Swedish former professional footballer
- Peter Eskilsson (1820–1872), Swedish genre painter
- Sture Eskilsson (1930–2016), Swedish economist
