= Vinnö =

- Location within Skåne Location within Sweden
- Coordinates: 56°03′N 14°05′E
- Country: Sweden
- Province: Skåne
- County: Skåne County
- Municipality: Kristianstad Municipality

Area
  - Total: 0.93 km^{2} (0.36 sq mi)

Population (31 December 2010)
  - Total: 536
  - Density: 577/km^{2} (1,490/sq mi)
- Time zone: UTC+1 (CET)
  - Summer (DST): UTC+2 (CEST)

Vinnö is a locality situated in Kristianstad Municipality, Skåne County, Sweden with 536 inhabitants in 2010.
