= Berth Idoffs =

Swedish dansband

- Origin: Vilshult, Blekinge Sweden
- Genres: Dansband music
- Years active: 1955–

Berth Idoffs is a dansband from Vilshult, Sweden, established in 1955.

The song "Små, små ord" was recorded by Berth Idoffs, on the 1988 album Dansglädje 88, scoring a Svensktoppen hit with the song for 10 weeks between 11 December 1988-26 February 1989, peaking at third position. Vikingarna recorded the song on 1998 album "Kramgoa låtar 16". Burkhardt Brozat wrote lyrics in German, as Wach' ich oder träum' ich, recorded by Vikingarna on the band's German-language album Kuschel dich in meine Arme during their German-language promotion, with the band known as "Vikinger". Anne-Lie Rydé recorded the song on her 2010 album Dans på rosor. The song has also been used in a commercial film.

== Former members ==
- Inge Svensson - guitar
- Kjell Gummesson - drums
- Berth Idoff - keyboards
- Conny Nilsson - vocals, guitar (1972-2000)
- Göte Färm - drums
- Mats Westerberg - bass, guitar (1987-1998)
- Magnus Persson - keyboard, guitar, accordion, vocals (1982-1992)
- Bo Jansson - bass, clarinet, saxophone, keyboards (1992-199?)
- Mats Dahlström - guitar, saxophone (1985-1992)
- Bengt-Erik Skantz - Keyboards, saxophone (1992-?)
- Jesper Svensson - keyboard, bass (1996 - 2000)
- Patrick Bertilsson - drums (1997 - 2000)
- Martin Wahlström - bass
- Johannes Nordgren - guitar, saxophone
- Conny Norrman - Keyboard
- Mats Thuresson - Saxophone, Kapellmeister (1983-1985)

== Current members ==
- Charlotte "Lotta" Idoffson - vocals
- Patrik "Palle" Ohlsson - Guitar, pedalsteel and violin
- Henric "Hebbe" Svensson - Keyboard, saxophone, accordion
- Marcus "Idoff" Idoffson - Kapellmeister, guitar, vocals and accordion
- Fredrik Ohlsson - drums, vocals

== Discography ==
=== Albums ===
- Sjung, dansa och le - 1975
- Dansglädje 86 - 1986
- Dansglädje 87 - 1987
- Dansglädje 88 - 1988
- Dansglädje 89 - 1989
- Dansglädje 90 - 1990
- Jag behöver dej - 1991
- För din skull - 1993
- En lyckostund - 2000
- Lätt för mig - 2011

== Svensktoppen songs ==
- Små, små ord - 1988
- Nere vid kusten - 1990
- Kärlek på gång - 1996
- Evelina - 1999

=== Tested for Svensktoppen, failed to enter chart ===
- Spelemän - 1997
- När du rör vid mig - 1998
- En lyckostund - 2000
