= Listed buildings in Blekinge County =

There are 92 listed buildings (Swedish: byggnadsminne) in Blekinge County, Sweden.

== Karlshamn Municipality ==
Image	Name	Premise	Number of buildings	Year built	Architect	Coordinates	ID
	Asschierska huset	Stockholm 1	1			56.17040°N 14.86170°E	21300000013853
	Froarps vattenverk	Froarp 14:1	5			56.22158°N 14.84952°E	21300000013044
	Väggaskolan, "gamla, nya skolan"	Läroverket 2	2			56.16498°N 14.87250°E	21300000013846
	Kvarteret Skänninge 16	Skänninge 16	1			56.17195°N 14.86293°E	21300000013848
	Kvarteret Ystad 10	Ystad 10	1			56.16699°N 14.86848°E	21300000013922
	Pengabergets vattenreservoar	Karlshamn 4:1	1			56.17448°N 14.87456°E	21300000014110
	Skottsbergska gården	Triangeln 2	6			56.17429°N 14.85864°E	21300000014105
	Televerkets hus	Riga 17	1			56.17117°N 14.86417°E	21300000014228
	Tennishallen	Tennishallen 1-2	1			56.16752°N 14.87653°E	21300000013921
	Villa Albertsberg	Karlshamn 5:21	4			56.15989°N 14.88545°E	21300000014112
	Wahlströmska gården	Simrishamn 27 previously Karlshamn 2:1	3			56.16628°N 14.86557°E	21300000014107

== Karlskrona Municipality ==
Image	Name	Premise	Number of buildings	Year built	Architect	Coordinates	ID
	Karlskrona fästning, Äspö, Tjurkö	Aspö 6:40, 6:62, 4:75, 6:87, Tjurkö 7:21, 7:47	none			56.11°N 15.58°E	21300000014047
	Augerums nya herrgård	Augerum 1:21	1			56.21720°N 15.67485°E	21300000014118
	Basareholmen	Karlskrona 2:27	17			56.15761°N 15.60926°E	21300000013978
	Bergqvistska gården	Wachtmeister 34	8			56.16189°N 15.58231°E	21300000013754
	Bröderna Mårtenssons båtbyggeri	Hästholmen 1:3	2			56.07807°N 15.76991°E	21300000014174
	Drottningskärs kastell	Drottningskär 1:1	3			56.11060°N 15.56384°E	21300000014230
	Flensburgska gården	Sjöblad 38	2			56.16320°N 15.59338°E	21300000013830
	Godnatts fästningstorn	Karlskrona 2:24 previously stg 186	1			56.14140°N 15.59442°E	21300000014232
	Grevagården	Wachtmeister 54; f.d.Wachtmeister 47	5			56.16224°N 15.58149°E	21300000014126
	Hallströmska gården	af Trolle 7	1			56.15865°N 15.59121°E	21300000013836
	Hokvinden	Karlskrona 4:20	1			56.15483°N 15.58072°E	21300000023994
	Hollströmska magasinet	Hästkvarnen 7	1			56.15903°N 15.59413°E	21300000013811
	Hubendickska huset	Sheldon 5	1			56.16191°N 15.58901°E	21300000013817
	Kvarteret af Trolle 4, 5	af Trolle 4, 5	1			56.15876°N 15.59023°E	21300000015253
	Augerums gamla herrgård (Augerum S:1	del av), 1:1, 2:1, 3:1, 4:1	10			56.21884°N 15.67642°E	21300000014116
	Metodistkyrkan i Karlskrona	Dockan 25	1			56.16061°N 15.57863°E	21300000014137
	Kruthuset på Ljungskär	Karlskrona 2:12 previously stg 117	1			56.16939°N 15.57633°E	21300000018891
	Kruthuset, våghuset på Mjölnarholmen	Karlskrona 2:13 previously stg 114	2			56.16511°N 15.60419°E	21300000018890
	Portalkran 14	Karlskrona 4:20	1			56.15717°N 15.57556°E	21300000020970
	Gamla mastkranen	Karlskrona 4:20	1			56.15900°N 15.57529°E	21300000014167
	Varmbadhuset i Karlskrona	Nauckhoff 15	1			56.16586°N 15.58870°E	21300000013812
	Residenset	Residenset 7	3			56.15825°N 15.59269°E	21300000013923
	Gamla vattentornet på Trossö	Sjöstjerna 3	1			56.16051°N 15.58716°E	21300000014124
	Saltkokningshuset	Stumholmen 1:1 previously 1:2	1			56.15887°N 15.59972°E	21300000014026
	Bastion Kungshall	Stumholmen 1:2 previously stg 113				56.15837°N 15.60122°E	21300000014005
	Bageribostället	Stumholmen 2:10 previously 1:2	1			56.16042°N 15.59774°E	21300000013995
	Bageriet/Beklädnadsförrådet	Stumholmen 2:10 previously 1:2	1			56.16058°N 15.59650°E	21300000013991
	Militärhäktet	Stumholmen 2:11 previously 1:2	1			56.16043°N 15.59806°E	21300000014025
	Båtsmanskasernen/Nya magasinet	Stumholmen 2.14	1			56.15971°N 15.59719°E	21300000013996
	Hangarerna, uppdragningsrampen	Stumholmen 2:15, 2:16 previously 1:2	2			56.15914°N 15.59908°E	21300000014002
	Tunnebodsmagasinet	Stumholmen 2:1	1			56.15941°N 15.59765°E	21300000014029
	Desinfektionshuset	Stumholmen 2:22 previously 2:1	1			56.16094°N 15.60064°E	21300000022067
	Epidemisjukhuset	Stumholmen 2:22 previously 2:1	1			56.16112°N 15.60023°E	21300000014035
	Kokhuset	Stumholmen 2:22 previously 2:1	1			56.16126°N 15.60035°E	21300000018859
	Kungshallsmagasinet	Stumholmen 2:2; f.d.Stumholmen 1:2	1			56.15833°N 15.60048°E	21300000018863
	Corps de garde	Stumholmen 2:9 previously 1:2	1			56.16078°N 15.59717°E	21300000013997
	Kasern Sparre	Sparre 3	1			56.16079°N 15.59341°E	21300000013924
	Köpmannagården i Kristianopel	Kristianopel 10:14	5			56.25787°N 16.04229°E	21300000013841
	Kronokvarnen i Lyckeby	Kvarnen 1; f.d.Lyckeby 27:1, 4:103	1			56.19704°N 15.65977°E	21300000013932
	Kungsholms fort	Karlskrona 2:30 previously stg 202	14			56.10797°N 15.58877°E	21300000013925
	Kungshuset	Dahlberg 3-4	1			56.16292°N 15.58457°E	21300000013810
	Kurrholmens fästningstorn	Karlskrona 2:20 previously stg 182	1			56.14161°N 15.54537°E	21300000014259
	Långörens lotshus	Torhamns-Långören 1:13	2			56.06328°N 15.82005°E	21300000014182
	Byggnader mm. på Lindholmen	Karlskrona 4:20	10			56.15256°N 15.58263°E	21300000013985
	Lotsstugan på Stumholmen	Stumholmen 2:18 previously 1:2	1			56.15888°N 15.59941°E	21300000014024
	Lyckebybron	Lyckeby 1:1	1			56.19700°N 15.66028°E	21300000013928
	Lyckeby källa	Vedeby 16:1	1			56.19961°N 15.65330°E	21300000013748
	Monteliuska gården	Sjöblad 68	3			56.16314°N 15.59308°E	21300000013828
	Nordenskjöldska gården	Bonde 8 previously Bonde 9	3			56.16003°N 15.58561°E	21300000014139
	Palanderska gården	Hubendick 3 previously Stuart-Hubendick 1 A	2			56.16645°N 15.59154°E	21300000014150
	Rådman Lunds gård	Clerk 26	1			56.16162°N 15.57720°E	21300000014152
	Repslagarebanan på Lindholmen	Karlskrona 4:20	1			56.15153°N 15.58458°E	21300000014298
	Skärva herrgård	Skärva 1:1	4			56.20086°N 15.57349°E	21300000013942
	Slup-, barkasskjulet	Karlskrona 2:8; f.d.2:1	1			56.16104°N 15.59794°E	21300000014027
	Södööska gården	Rådmannen 10, 17	5			56.15998°N 15.58485°E	21300000014156
	Stora kruthuset på Koholmen	Karlskrona 2:28 previously stg 190	7			56.15935°N 15.61406°E	21300000018889
	Stora Vörta	Stora Vörta 1:68	3			56.20352°N 15.54555°E	21300000013936
	Sydkustens örlogsbas	Karlskrona 4:17 m.fl	41			56.15637°N 15.58568°E	21300000014042
	Thörnska gården	Adlersten 51	5			56.16338°N 15.58985°E	21300000013757
	Utklippans fyrplats	Utklippan 1:1 previously Norra; Södra Skär 1:1	4			55.95318°N 15.70191°E	21300000014294
	Västra kölhalningsbron	Karlskrona 4:20	3			56.15502°N 15.58351°E	21300000023995
	von Otterska gården	Wrangel 3, 4	1			56.15865°N 15.59309°E	21300000014172

== Olofström Municipality ==
Image	Name	Premise	Number of buildings	Year built	Architect	Coordinates	ID
	Alltidhults skola	Alltidhult 1:42	2			56.26184°N 14.45474°E	21300000019864
	Brokamåla backstuga	Brokamåla 1:17-1:18	2			56.29811°N 14.47996°E	21300000013844
	Ebbamåla gjuteri	Ebbemåla 1:16, 1:48	13			56.37003°N 14.68121°E	21300000014200
	Forneboda	Tulseboda 1:12, 1:22	2			56.35868°N 14.60299°E	21300000014205
	Gränums bränneri	Gränum 4:73	2			56.22193°N 14.59634°E	21300000014195

== Ronneby Municipality ==
Image	Name	Premise	Number of buildings	Year built	Architect	Coordinates	ID
	Hakarpsgården	Hakarp 2:10 previously 2:2	2			56.20259°N 15.12656°E	21300000013730
	Johannishus slott	Johannishus 1:2	19			56.24508°N 15.41426°E	21300000013738
	Jordö missionshus	Jordö 2:52	1			56.15952°N 15.42703°E	21300000014207
	Möllerydsstugan	Johannishus 1:2	1			56.25770°N 15.39844°E	21300000013742
	Ronneby brunn	Karlstorp 2:1, 2:2; Ronneby 16:143	17			56.19772°N 15.28587°E	21300000014209
	Tromtö herrgård	Vambåsa 1:4	7			56.16098°N 15.48536°E	21300000013735

== Sölvesborg Municipality ==
Image	Name	Premise	Number of buildings	Year built	Architect	Coordinates	ID
	Sölvesborgs slott Corps de logi	Borgen 3	1			56.05610°N 14.59415°E	21300000018898
	Sölvesborgs slott Förvaltarebostad; Uthuslängor	Borgen 4	2			56.05662°N 14.59416°E	21300000018900
	Gamla fattighuset i Sölvesborg	Ungersbacke 13	1			56.05232°N 14.57834°E	21300000014217
	Hörby gård	Hörby 6:2	7			56.04881°N 14.65368°E	21300000014214
	Nicolaigården	Pelikanen 2 F.d Pelikanen 1 Gamla telegrafen	1			56.05298°N 14.58541°E	21300000014221
	Listers härads tingshus i Sölvesborg	Domaren 4	1	1919–1921	Gunnar Asplund	56.05100°N 14.57718°E	21300000014223
	Stationshuset, Sölvesborg	Sölvesborg 4:5	1			56.04996°N 14.58354°E	21300000014060
	Valje gård	Valje 1:38	7			56.05543°N 14.55335°E	21300000014224
