= Östra Sönnarslöv Church =

- Östra Sönnarslövs kyrka
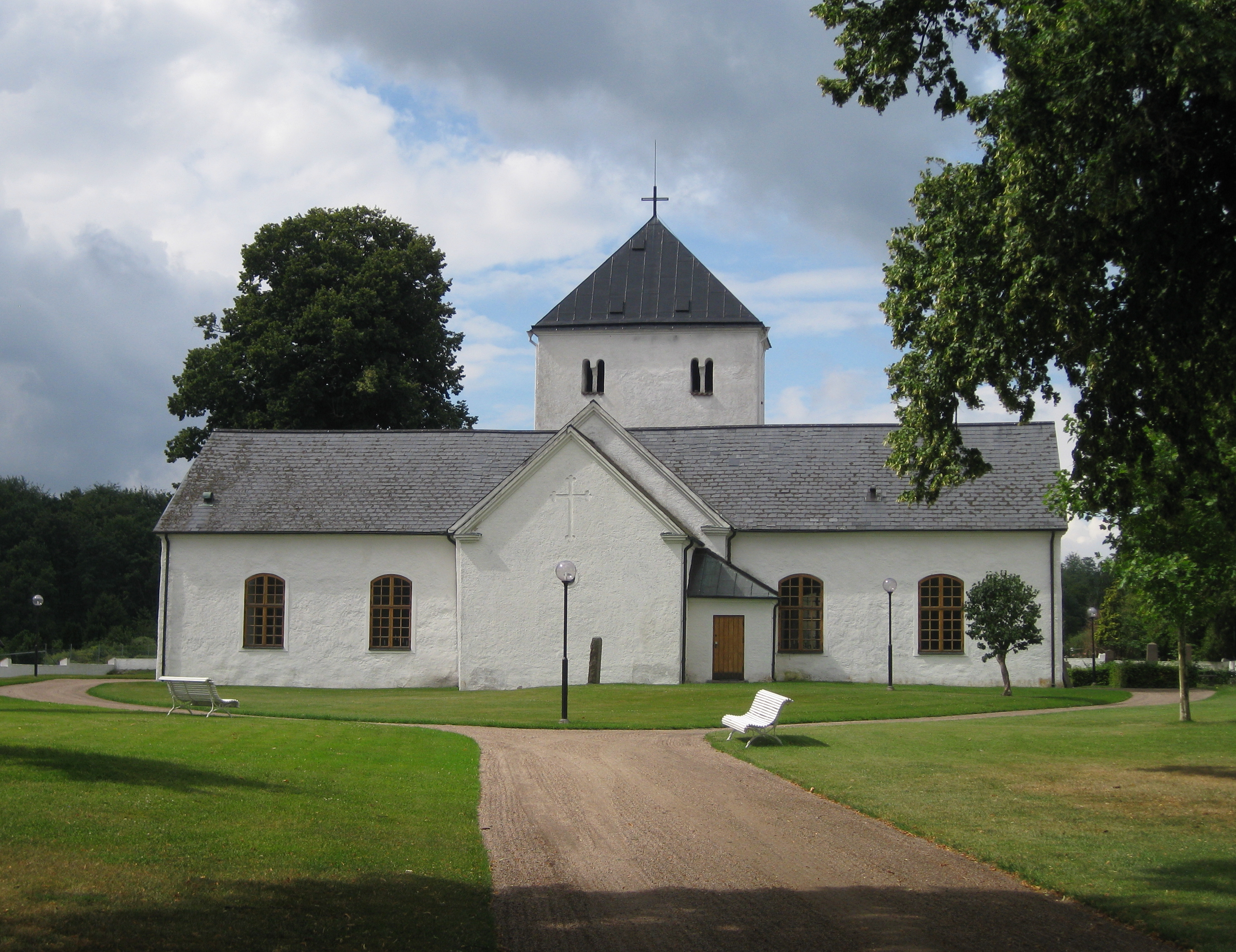
- Östra Sönnarslöv Church

- 55°53′05″N 14°01′01″E
- Country: Sweden
- Denomination: Church of Sweden

Östra Sönnarslöv Church (Swedish: Östra Sönnarslövs kyrka) is a church in Östra Sönnarslöv, a village in Kristianstad Municipality, Scania, Sweden.

== History ==
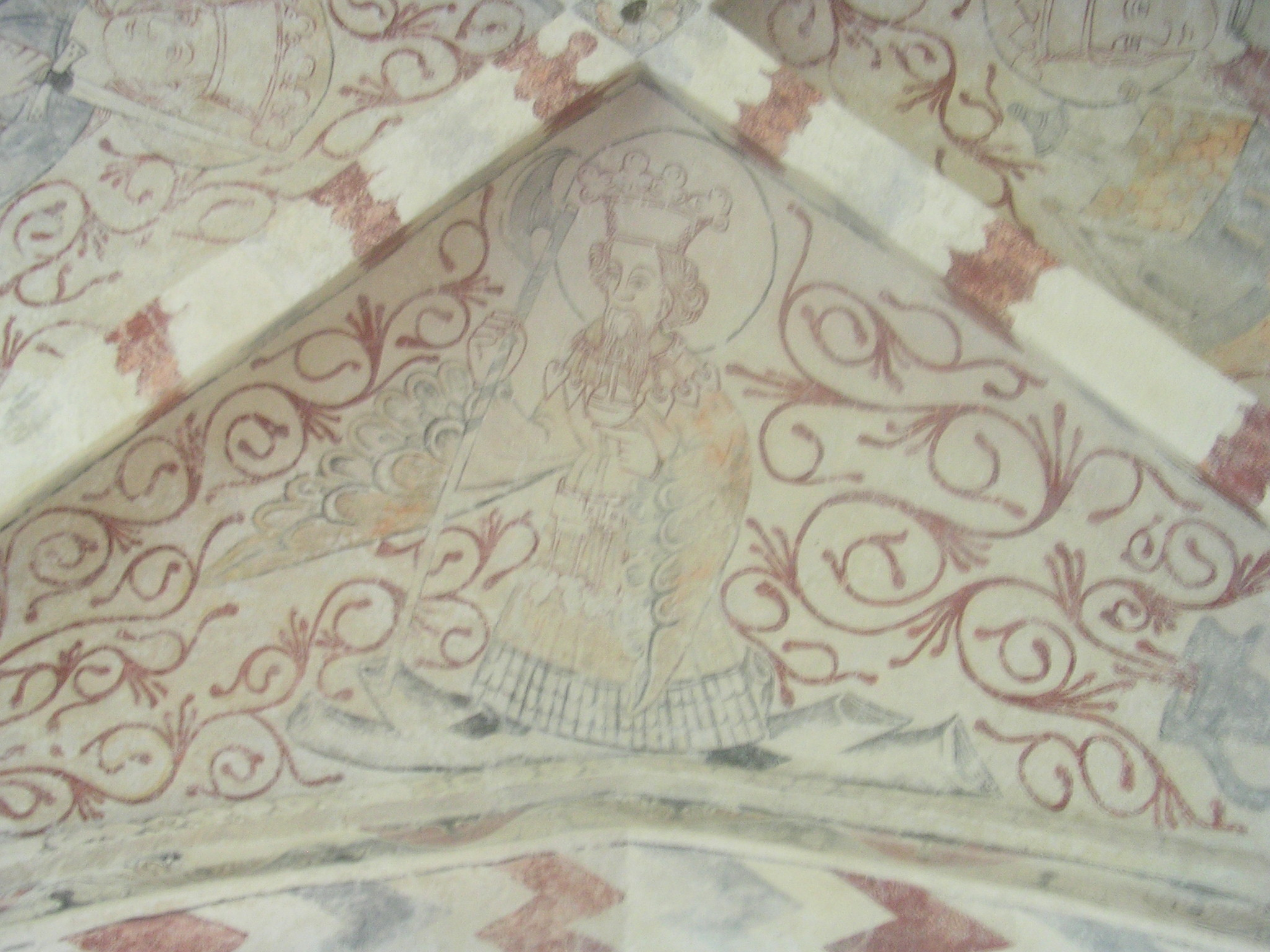
Saint Olaf, 15th-century mural in the chancel

The church originally consisted of a nave, a chancel and an apse, and was built during the 12th century. The broad tower was added in the 13th century. The church contains the graves of the Ramel family, lords of nearby Maltesholm Castle. During the 18th century a north transept arm was added, and during substantial reconstruction works in the 1860s another transept arm was added to the south. The apse was demolished at the same time, and the nave heavily rebuilt; today only the tower and the chancel are preserved from the medieval church. A renovation was carried out in the 1960s, and at this time the medieval murals in the chancel were restored.

== Murals and furnishings ==
The murals in the chancel are from the middle of the 15th century and unusually well-preserved with vivid colours and sharp contours. They depict the four saints Barbara, Gertrude, Olaf and Canute. The baptismal font of the church is from the late 12th century and originally perhaps belonged to another medieval church, Västra Vrams kyrka, which was demolished in the 19th century and replaced with a new building. The font has carved floral ornamentation, and has on stylistic grounds been attributed to the Romanesque artist Tove. The other furnishings are considerably younger; the pews are partially from 1611 but mostly from the 19th century, and the richly decorated wooden pulpit is from 1636.
