= Östra Vram Church =

- Östra Vrams kyrka
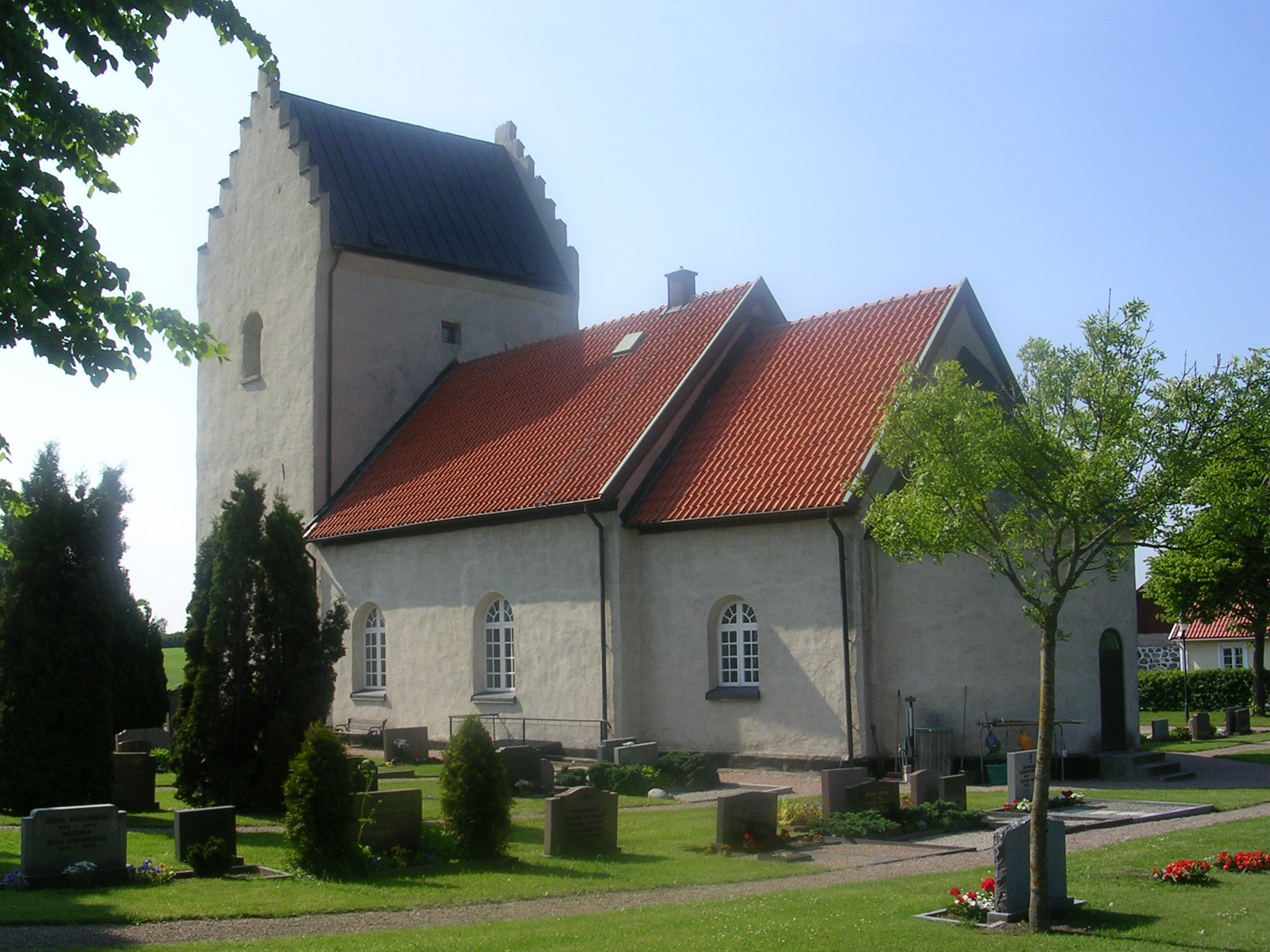
- Östra Vram Church

- 55°55′52″N 14°01′23″E
- Country: Sweden
- Denomination: Church of Sweden

Östra Vram Church (Swedish: Östra Vrams kyrka) is a church in Östra Vram, a village in Kristianstad Municipality, Scania, Sweden. It is a well-preserved medieval church, still containing several medieval works of art as well as murals from the 14th century.

== History and architecture ==
The church in Östra Vram was built at the end of the 12th century and is unusually well-preserved. The nave, chancel and apse remain from the earliest building. The broad tower was built during the 13th century, while the vaults date from the 15th century. The windows were enlarged during the 19th century, and a medieval church porch was demolished in 1870.

== Murals and furnishings ==
The church was renovated in the 1950s, and in connection with this fragmentary murals from the 13th century were discovered and restored. The apse is decorated with a mural depicting Christ in Majesty, together with the twelve Apostles. Other murals in the chancel depict scenes from the Old Testament. There are also fragmentary remains of murals in the nave.

The church contains three medieval wooden sculptures. Two date from the 14th century: a wooden statue of Saint Olaf, and one depicting Mary. There is also an unusual 15th-century rood cross, depicting Christ as triumphant, and not as suffering, which was typical at the time. Most of the other furnishings date from the 17th century; the altarpiece is from 1630, and the pulpit is from approximately the same time. The pews and the baptismal font are also from the 17th century.
