= Köpinge Church =

- Köpinge kyrka
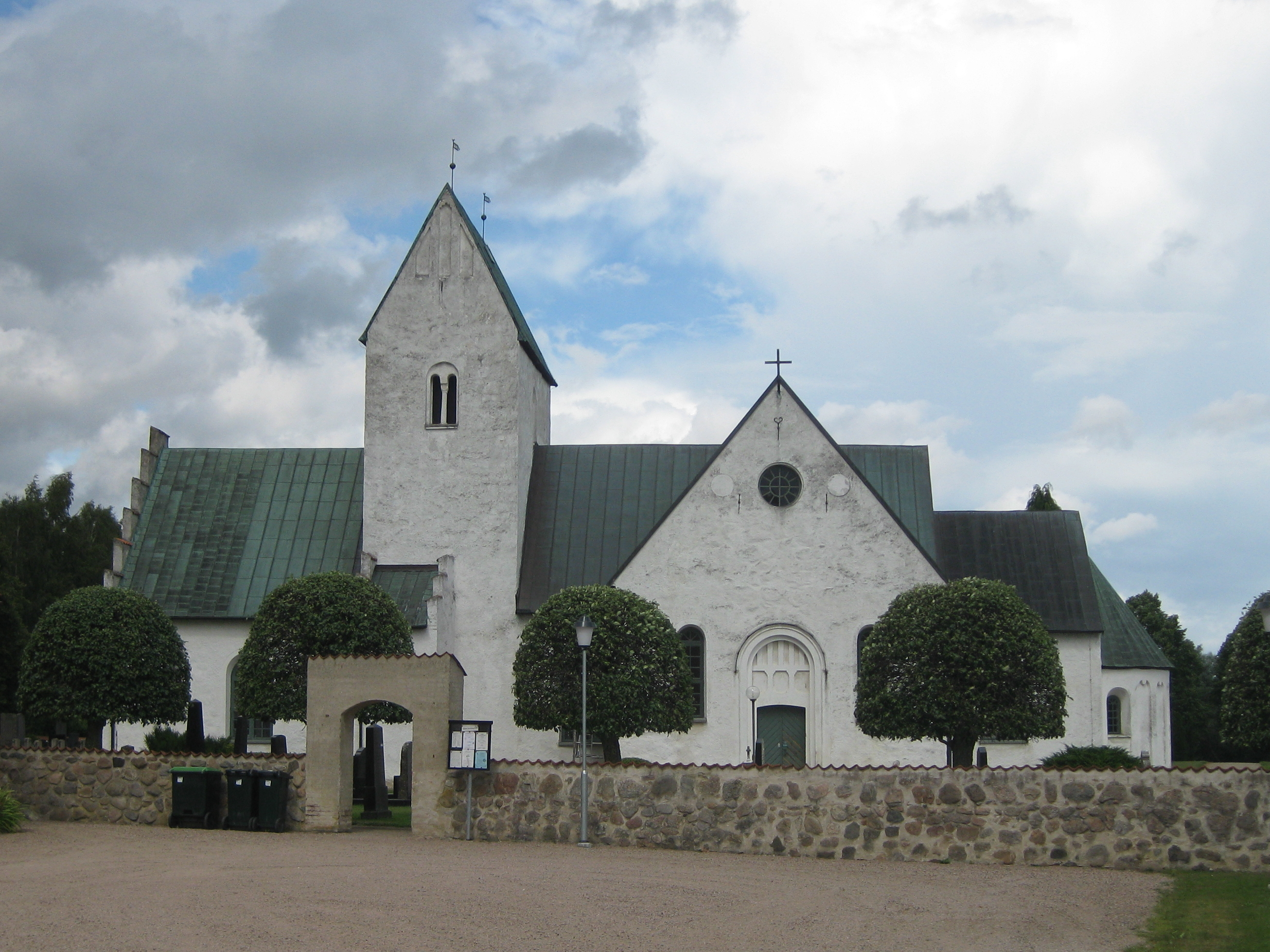
- Köpinge Church

- Location within Skåne Location within Sweden
- 55°56′18″N 14°09′29″E
- Country: Sweden
- Denomination: Church of Sweden

Köpinge Church (Swedish: Köpinge kyrka) is a medieval church in Gärds Köpinge, Kristianstad Municipality, Scania, Sweden.

== History ==
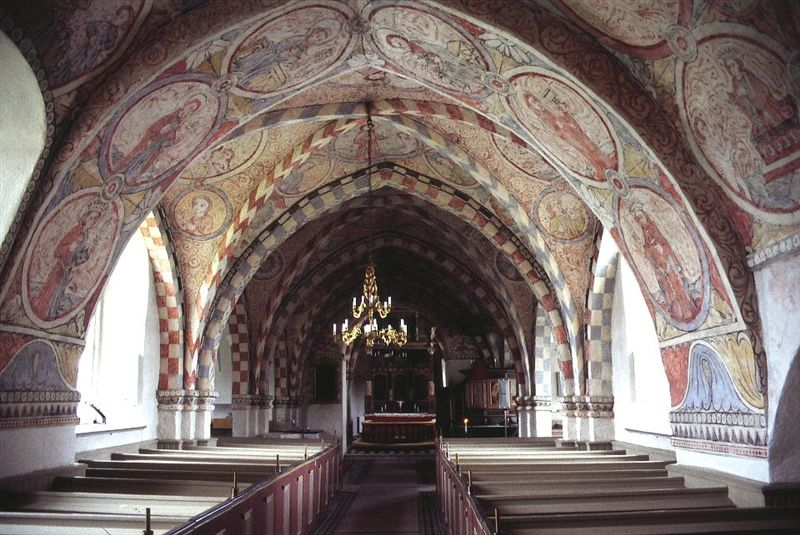
View of the interior and the medieval murals

The oldest parts of the present stone church are from the middle of the 12th century, but remains of an older, wooden church have been found in the church. The broad west tower, the nave, chancel and the apse are the oldest parts of the presently visible church. The apse of the church is unusual in that it is comparatively richly decorated with pilasters dividing it into several sections. In the 14th century, a church porch was added in front of the tower entrance, and the interior was rebuilt during the 15th century, when the presently visible vaults were constructed. In 1560 a north transept was added, and in 1796 a south transept was also constructed. Renovations were carried out during the 19th century, when among other things the windows were changed. In the 1950s a large scale restoration was made under the leadership of architect Torsten Leon-Nilson. The church was restored again in 2009–2010.

== Murals and furnishings ==
Both the nave and the chancel are richly decorated with church murals from the 1460s. The vaults in the nave contain pictures which tell the story of Genesis, while the chancel shows the Last Judgment. Stylistically, the murals are related to those in Vittskövle Church.

A Madonna from the 1430s, made in Lübeck, belongs to the church. The altarpiece of the church is from 1600 and made by Daniel Thomissen in Malmö. The baptismal font is from the 19th century and made of Carrara marble.
