= Olofströms IK =

Swedish ice hockey club

- City: Olofström, Sweden
- League: Division 1
- Division: Group F
- Founded: 1970
- Home arena: HBM Arena
- Head coach: Andreas Svensson
- Captain: Linus Johansson
- Website: Official website

Olofströms IK is an ice hockey club in Sweden. They have played in Division 1 since the 2003-04 season.

== Season-by-season record ==
updated December 2, 2013

Season	League	GP	W	T	L	OTW	OTL	Pts	GF	GA	Finish	Playoffs
1995-96	Div. 2	18	11	1	16	–	–	23	97	57	3rd	Promoted
1996-97	Div. 1	14	5	1	8	–	–	13	32	48	10th	–
1997-98	Div. 1	14	3	5	6	–	–	12	36	49	8th	–
1998-99	Div. 1	28	7	3	18	–	–	17	97	137	7th	–
1999-00	Div. 1	18	8	6	4	–	–	22	78	47	4th	–
2000-01	Div. 1	16	8	2	6	–	–	18	56	58	5th	-
2001-02	Div. 1	18	5	3	10	–	–	13	52	72	8th	Relegated
2002-03	Div. 2	26	17	4	5	–	–	38	144	75	2nd	Promoted
2003-04	Div. 1	32	10	7	15	–	–	27	81	99	8th	–
2004-05	Div. 1	36	15	2	15	2	2	53	114	113	7th	–
2005-06	Div. 1	44	19	2	20	1	2	63	153	146	8th	–
2006-07	Div. 1	36	19	5	10	1	1	65	155	125	4th	–
2006-07	Div. 1 Continuation	6	3	–	3	0	0	15	33	19	3rd	–
2007-08	Div. 1	27	12	4	7	0	4	44	115	84	4th	–
2007-08	Div. 1 Continuation	14	4	2	8	0	0	14	37	47	5th	–
2008-09	Div. 1	27	13	–	8	3	3	48	110	80	5th	–
2008-09	Div. 1 Continuation	10	4	–	5	1	0	22	37	31	3rd	–
2009-10	Div. 1	27	18	–	6	1	2	58	115	77	2nd	–
2009-10	Div. 1 Continuation	14	8	–	4	1	1	27	62	39	3rd	Qualified for Kvalserien
2009-10	Kvalserien	10	3	–	7	0	0	9	24	36	5th	–
2010-11	Div. 1	27	15	–	11	0	1	46	92	79	4th	-
2010-11	Div. 1 Continuation	14	4	–	5	1	4	18	45	46	6th	–
2011-12	Div. 1	27	19	–	6	0	2	59	119	74	2nd	–
2011-12	Div. 1 Continuation	14	6	–	4	1	3	23	53	50	4th	Qualified for Kvalserien
2011-12	Kvalserien	10	4	–	4	1	1	15	35	29	4th	–
2012-13	Div. 1	30	16	–	11	3	0	54	114	83	2nd	–
2012-13	Div. 1 Continuation	14	7	–	2	2	3	28	46	28	2nd	–

== Current roster ==
Updated December 2, 2013.

No.	Nat	Player	Pos	S/G	Age	Acquired	Birthplace
18	(Sweden)	Jesper Appel	D	L	32	2013	Karlstad, Sweden
33	(Sweden)	Joel Backesten	D	L	34	2013	Umeå, Sweden
51	(Sweden)	Adam Bergqvist	F	L	32	2013	Sweden
34	(Sweden)	Daniel Bertov	D	L	33	2012	Sweden
11	(Sweden)	Gustav Borglin	LW	L	33	2013	Sävsjö, Sweden
49	(Sweden)	Anton Byström	LW	L	33	2013	Örnsköldsvik, Sweden
19	(United States)	Zach Cohen	LW	L	38	2013	Schaumburg, Illinois, United States
21	(Canada)	Keegan Dansereau	RW	R	38	2013	Saskatoon, Saskatchewan, Canada
46	(Sweden)	Thomas Fahlqvist	C	L	40	2011	Sundsvall, Sweden
26	(Sweden)	Peter Fransson	D	L	31	2009	Sweden
40	(Sweden)	Linus Johansson (C)	C	L	33	2012	Ljungby, Sweden
44	(Sweden)	Viktor Jonsson	D	R	33	2012	Sweden
19	(Sweden)	Filip Lööf	LW	L	29	2011	Sweden
27	(Denmark)	Felix Maegaard Scheel	LW	L	33	2012	Virum, Denmark
15	(Sweden)	Adrian Malmros	LW	L	30	2011	Höör, Sweden
78	(Sweden)	Hannes Nordgren	D	L	32	2013	Karlskrona, Sweden
30	(Sweden)	Otto Nordgren	G	L	34	2013	Karlskrona, Sweden
63	(Sweden)	Karl Pearson	D	L	36	2013	Sweden
87	(Sweden)	Niklas Persson	RW	L	39	2007	Olofström, Sweden
4	(Sweden)	Markus Petersson	D	L	32	2009	Sweden
17	(Sweden)	Dan Pettersson (A)	C	L	33	2012	Sweden
13	(Sweden)	Kristoffer Pihlqvist	C	L	33	2013	Jönköping, Sweden
1	(Slovenia)	Matija Pintaric	G	R	36	2012	Maribor, Slovenia
46	(Sweden)	Niklas Sjöström	RW	L	35	2013	Sweden
77	(Sweden)	Johan Svensson	RW	R	36	2013	Sweden
22	(Sweden)	Joakim Sydegård (A)	RW	L	36	2009	Södertälje, Sweden
