= Söderportgymnasiet =

Secondary school in Sweden

Coordinates: 56°01′34″N 14°09′28″E

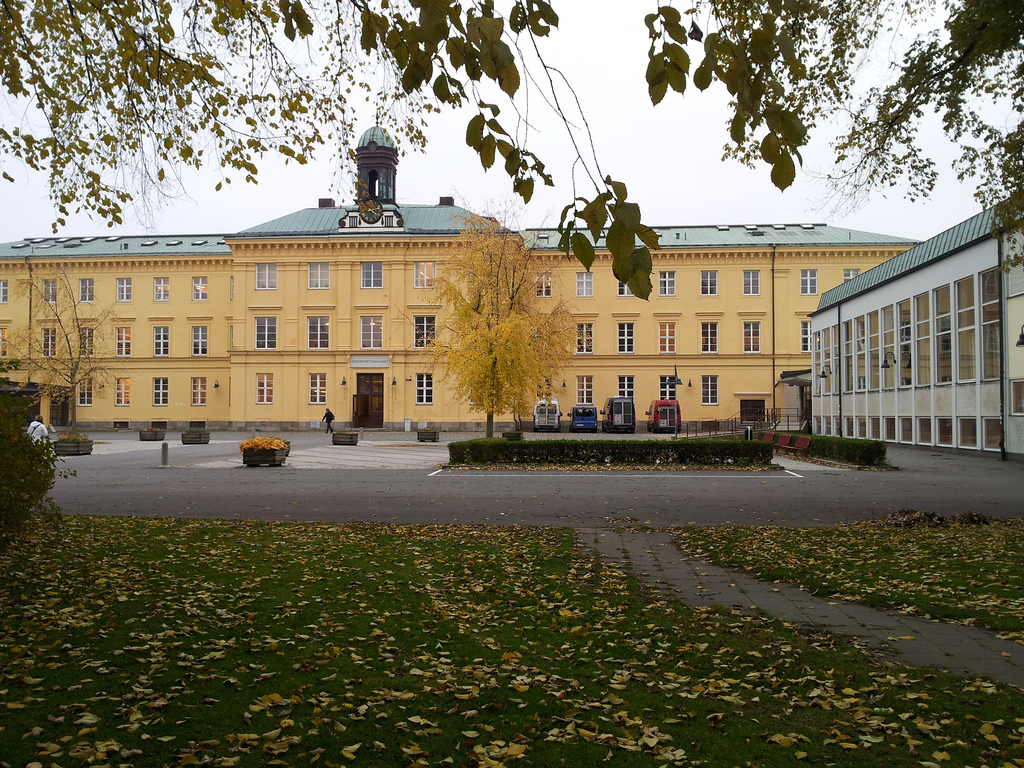
Main building and gymnasium of Söderport Upper Secondary School, Kristianstad.

Söderportgymnasiet, an upper secondary school, was opened in 1875 in order to accommodate the increasing number of students in Kristianstad. The school was built on a site previously occupied by the southern gate of the city walls, hence the current name Söderportgymnasiet. In 1878 the school was named Högre allmänna läroverket, and in 1968 renamed Söderportskolan in connection with a nationwide reform. In 2002 the school received its current name to better illustrate the level of education conducted there (Swedish gymnasium = upper secondary school).

In the beginning of the 20th century the school had some 300 students. In 1907 two girls graduated from the school, albeit as external candidates, and in 1923 it became fully co-educational. Today the school has 1100 students, of which about 50 are in the International Baccalaureate Diploma Programme, which started there in 2000.

On the other side of the old city core lies a primary school named Norreportskolan since it is located right next to the other, the northern, city fortification gate.

== Notable alumni ==
- Gustaf Hellström, novelist, Member of the Swedish Academy
