= Gärds Köpinge =

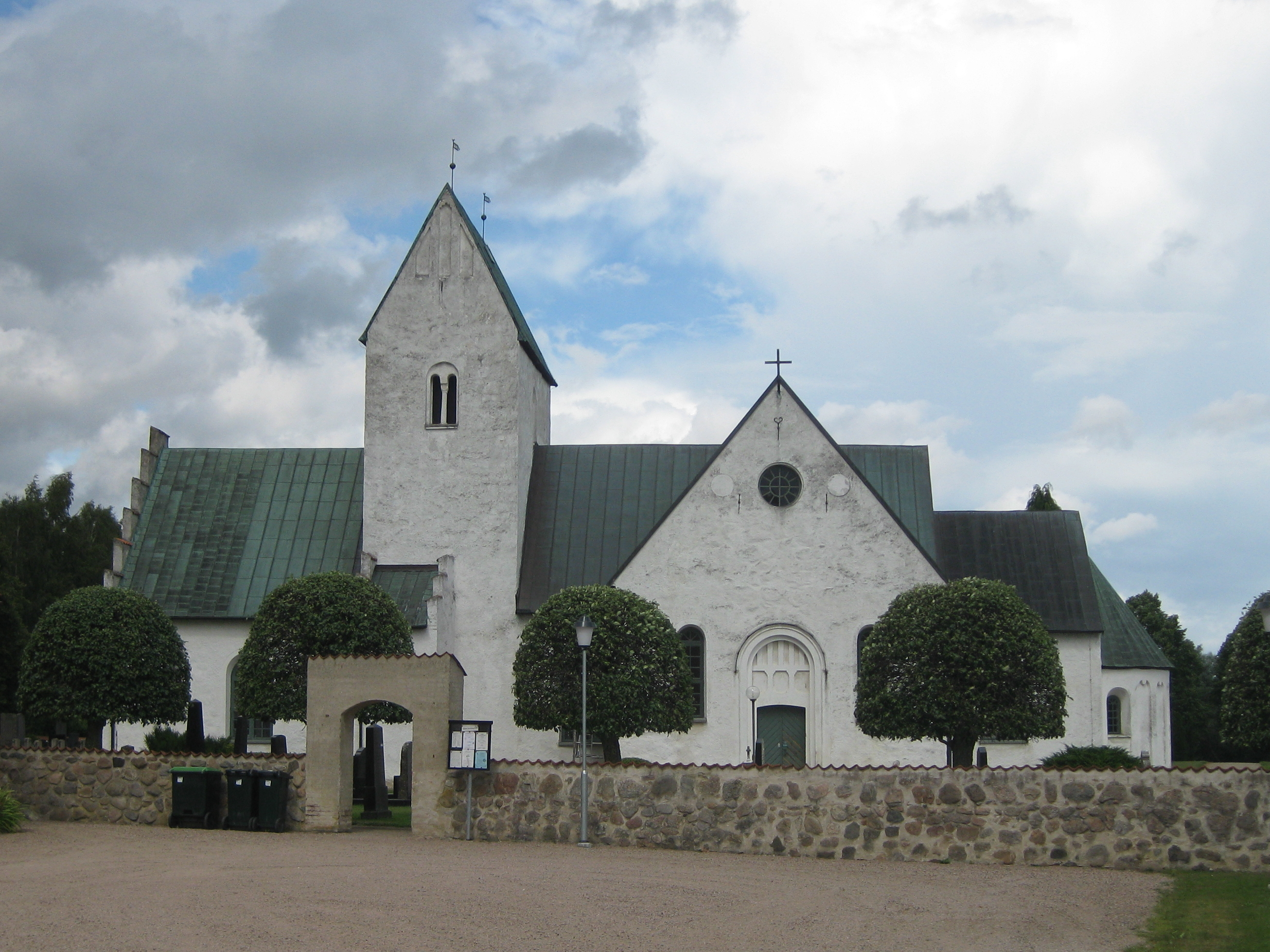
- Köpinge Church in Gärds Köpinge

- Location within Skåne Location within Sweden
- Coordinates: 55°56′N 14°09′E
- Country: Sweden
- Province: Skåne
- County: Skåne County
- Municipality: Kristianstad Municipality

Area
  - Total: 1.02 km^{2} (0.39 sq mi)

Population (31 December 2010)
  - Total: 936
  - Density: 916/km^{2} (2,370/sq mi)
- Time zone: UTC+1 (CET)
  - Summer (DST): UTC+2 (CEST)

Gärds Köpinge is a locality situated in Kristianstad Municipality, Skåne County, Sweden with 936 inhabitants in 2010.

The medieval Köpinge Church in Gärds Köpinge is richly decorated with medieval murals.
