= Gränum =

- Location within Blekinge Location within Sweden
- Coordinates: 56°14′N 14°35′E
- Country: Sweden
- Province: Blekinge
- County: Blekinge County
- Municipality: Olofström Municipality

Area
  - Total: 0.37 km^{2} (0.14 sq mi)

Population (31 December 2010)
  - Total: 223
  - Density: 609/km^{2} (1,580/sq mi)
- Time zone: UTC+1 (CET)
  - Summer (DST): UTC+2 (CEST)

Gränum is a locality situated in Olofström Municipality, Blekinge County, Sweden with 223 inhabitants in 2010.

== Natives from Gränum ==
- Robert Engstrand - (born 6 July 1976), pianist and keyboard player
