= Tove (sculptor) =

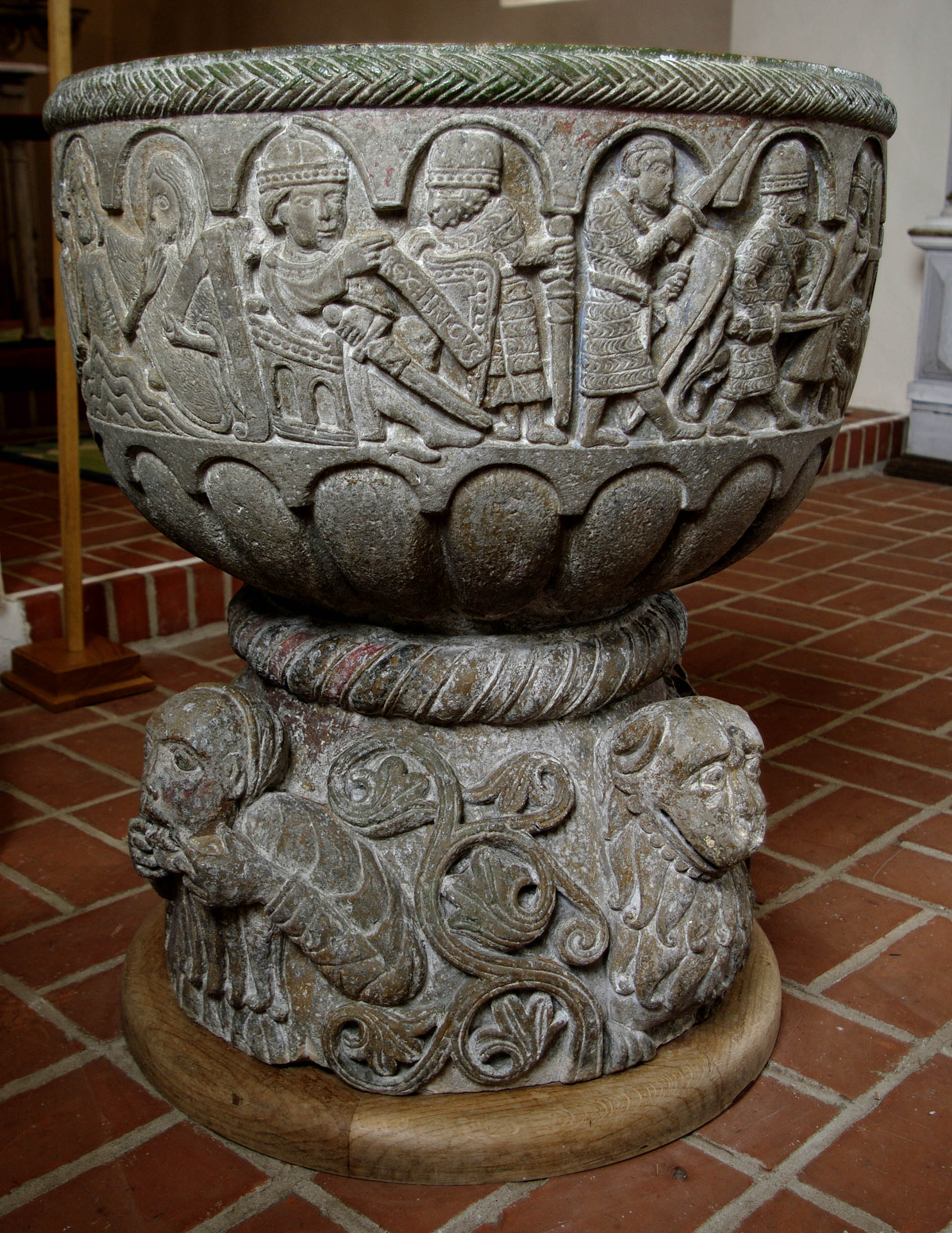
The baptismal font in Lyngsjö Church, a work by Tove

Tove was a sculptor and stonemason active in Scania during the Middle Ages. The artist made and signed the baptismal font of Gumlösa Church with the words Tove gierhi ("Tove made me"). Gumlösa Church was inaugurated in 1191. Tove also made the baptismal font in Lyngsjö Church and perhaps Östra Sönnarslöv and Bjäresjö Church, also in Scania.
