= Hammar, Kristianstad =

Hammar
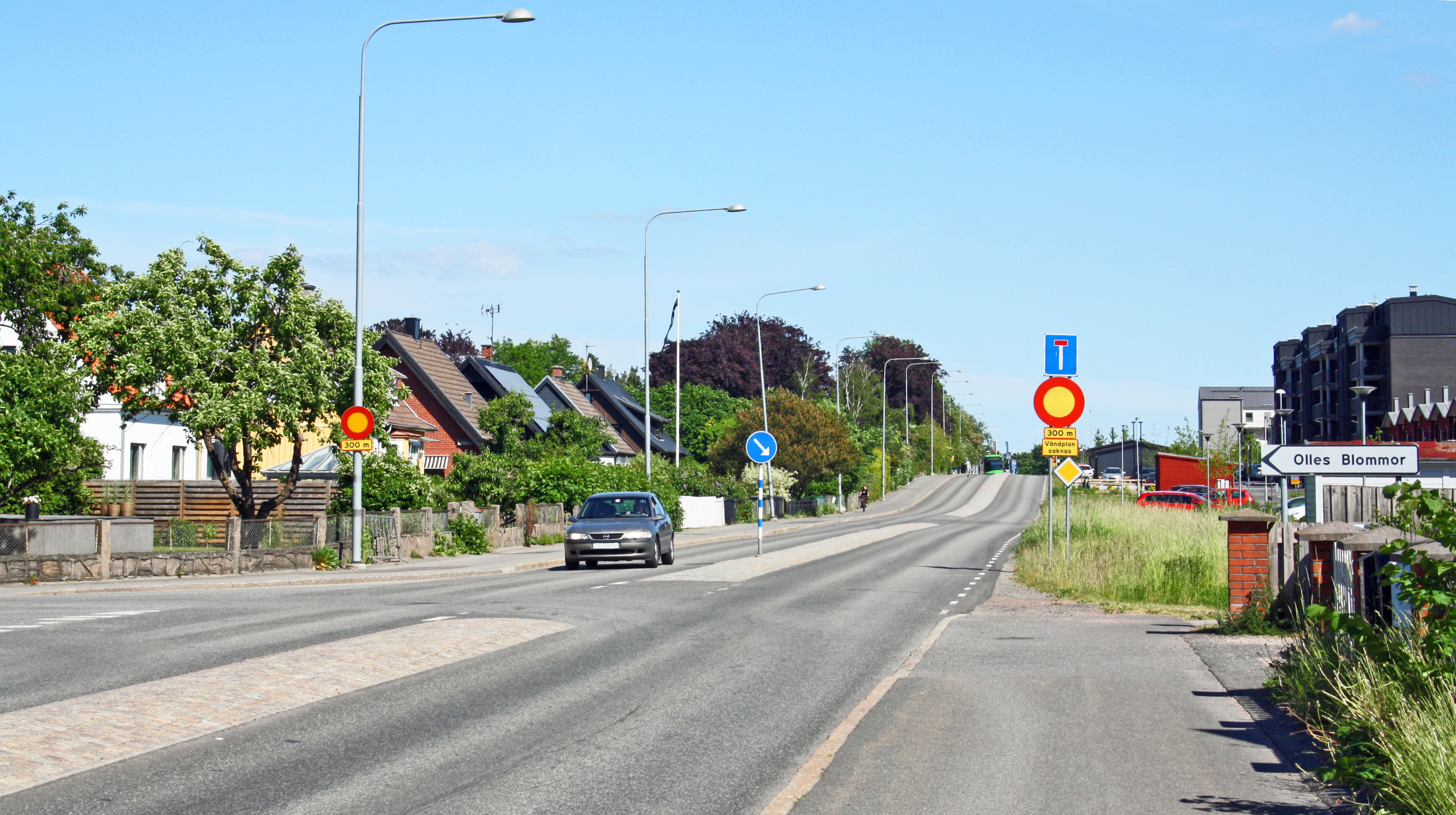
- Hammar (Kristianstad municipality)

- Location within Skåne Location within Sweden
- Coordinates: 56°02′N 14°10′E
- Country: Sweden
- Province: Skåne
- County: Skåne County
- Municipality: Kristianstad Municipality

Area
  - Total: 1.41 km^{2} (0.54 sq mi)

Population (31 December 2010)
  - Total: 2,057
  - Density: 1,457/km^{2} (3,770/sq mi)
- Time zone: UTC+1 (CET)
  - Summer (DST): UTC+2 (CEST)

Hammar is a locality situated in Kristianstad Municipality, Skåne County, Sweden with 2,057 inhabitants in 2010.
