= Olofströms IBK =

Floorball club in Olofström, Sweden

- Full name: Olofströms innebandyklubb
- Short name: OIBK
- Founded: 1986
- Arena: Olofströms idrottshall

Olofströms IBK is a floorball club in Olofström, Sweden, established 1986. The men's team played in the Swedish top division during the 1989-1990 season.
