= Olofström Municipality =

Olofström Municipality Olofströms kommun
- Municipality
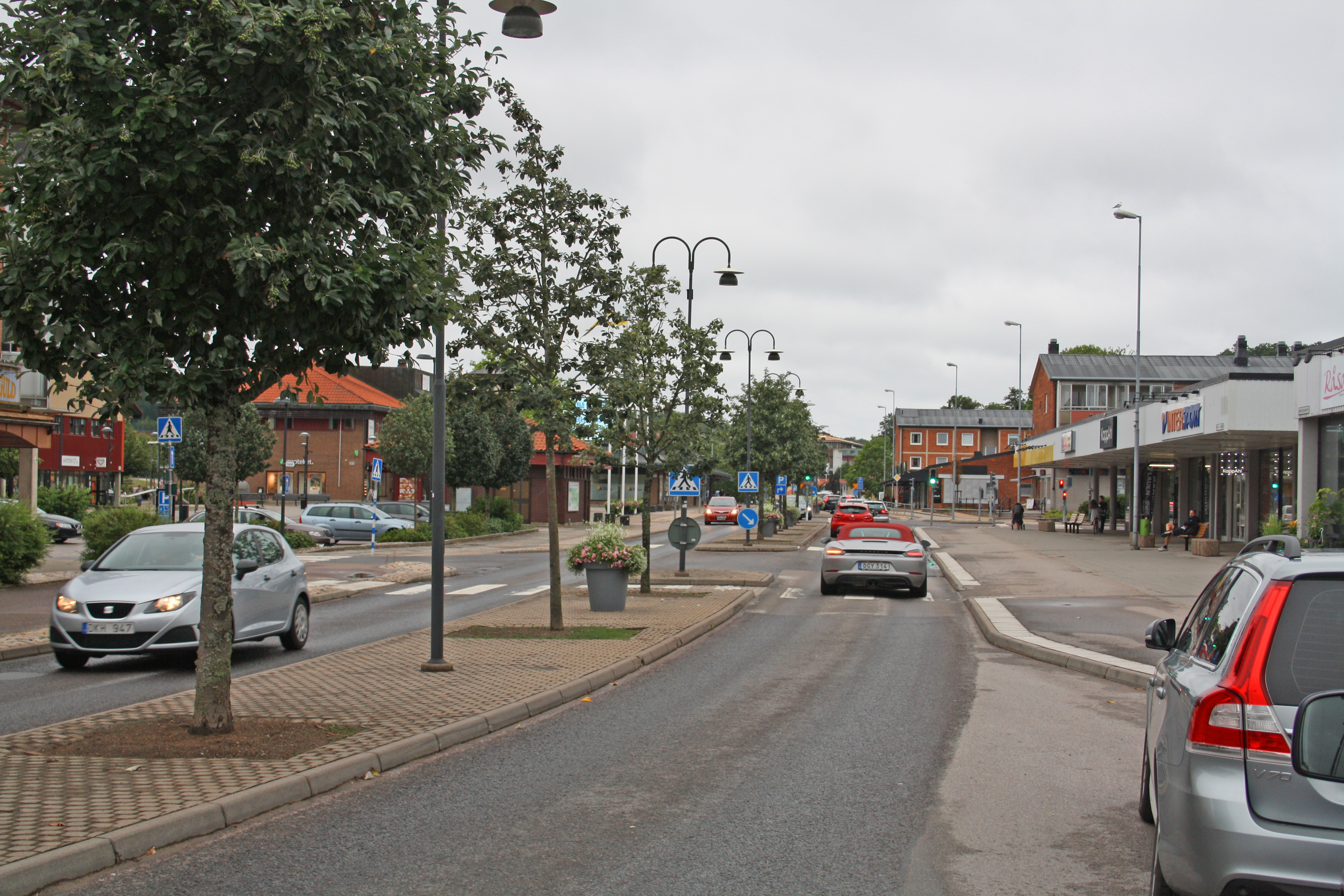

- Flag Coat of arms

- Coordinates: 56°16′N 14°32′E
- Country: Sweden
- County: Blekinge County
- Seat: Olofström

Area
  - Total: 413.43 km^{2} (159.63 sq mi)
  - Land: 389.79 km^{2} (150.50 sq mi)
  - Water: 23.64 km^{2} (9.13 sq mi)
- Area as of 1 January 2014.

Population (30 June 2025)
  - Total: 12,905
  - Density: 33.108/km^{2} (85.748/sq mi)
- Time zone: UTC+1 (CET)
  - Summer (DST): UTC+2 (CEST)
- ISO 3166 code: SE
- Province: Blekinge
- Municipal code: 1060
- Website: www.olofstrom.se

Olofström Municipality (Swedish: Olofströms kommun) is the only landlocked municipality in Blekinge County, South Sweden. It borders to Osby Municipality, Kristianstad Municipality, Bromölla Municipality, Sölvesborg Municipality, Karlshamn Municipality, Tingsryd Municipality, and Älmhult Municipality. The town of Olofström is the seat of the municipality.

The amalgamation of the former units in this area took place in 1967 when the market town Olofström (itself detached from Jämshög in 1941) was merged with Kyrkhult and Jämshög.

Notable person that Olofström counts as theirs is Nobel Prize winning author Harry Martinson (1904-1978; prize in 1974) who was born in Jämshög within the municipality.

== Geography ==
The municipality is covered with forests and lakes. It labels itself "The southernmost wildlife in Sweden", probably because there are scarcely any forests or lakes south of the Blekinge province.

The highest point in the province and county of Blekinge, Rävabacken (189,65 m), is located in the northern part of the municipality.

=== Urban areas ===
There are 5 localities classified as urban areas (tätort in Swedish) in Olofström Municipality. In addition to that, there is one more recognized locality.

In the table the urban areas and localities are listed according to the size of the population as of December 31, 2006. The municipal seat is in bold characters.

#	Locality	Population
1	**Olofström**	7,425
2	Jämshög	1,605
3	Kyrkhult	1,016
4	Vilshult	327
5	Gränum	208
6	Hemsjö	73

== Demographics ==
This is a demographic table based on Olofström Municipality's electoral districts in the 2022 Swedish general election sourced from SVT's election platform, in turn taken from SCB official statistics.

In total there were 13,243 residents, including 10,168 Swedish citizens of voting age. 44.1% voted for the left coalition and 55.0% for the right coalition. Indicators are in percentage points except population totals and income.

Location	Residents	Citizen adults	Left vote	Right vote	Employed	Swedish parents	Foreign heritage	Income SEK	Degree
Location			%	%					
Brännaregården	1,396	1,118	40.1	58.7	80	76	24	25,130	32
Ekeryd-Gränum	1,390	1,121	41.9	56.9	77	77	23	22,704	26
Jämshög	1,773	1,367	46.3	52.9	79	77	23	24,482	30
Kyrkhult-Hemsjö	1,857	1,420	40.8	59.0	85	89	11	25,399	30
Olofström C	1,674	1,297	51.7	46.9	72	53	47	22,007	25
Olofström-Vilshult	1,480	1,149	42.6	56.4	74	70	30	22,898	24
Oredslund	1,789	1,319	46.4	53.1	76	55	45	23,246	26
Vilboken	1,884	1,377	43.5	55.8	72	58	42	23,841	27
Source: SVT

== Parishes ==
- Jämshög Parish
- Kyrkhult Parish

== Industry ==
The increased use of cars in the 1950s and 60's was the great boost for the municipality. Today the car industry, dominated by Volvo Cars, is the largest employer in Olofström with 2,400 employees, and some more working in other companies connected to this industry. The Volvo industry, with related production, is probably the main reason that the municipality's commuting surplus (as of 2005) is almost 2,000 a day, with many workers coming from the neighboring municipalities of a.o. Bromölla, Karlshamn and Sölvesborg.

Vilshult is a small village within the municipality, situated 10 km north of the central locality of Olofström. It is recognised for a photovoltaics (PV) modules factory that has been located there since 2001.
