= Balsby =

Swedish locality

- Location within Skåne Location within Sweden
- Coordinates: 56°04′N 14°12′E
- Country: Sweden
- Province: Skåne
- County: Skåne County
- Municipality: Kristianstad Municipality

Area
  - Total: 0.39 km^{2} (0.15 sq mi)

Population (31 December 2010)
  - Total: 430
  - Density: 1,099/km^{2} (2,850/sq mi)
- Time zone: UTC+1 (CET)
  - Summer (DST): UTC+2 (CEST)

Balsby (Swedish pronunciation: [ˈbɑ̌ːlsbʏ]) is a locality situated in Kristianstad Municipality, Skåne County, Sweden with 430 inhabitants in 2010.
