= Tollarp =

- Location within Skåne Location within Sweden
- Coordinates: 55°56′N 13°58′E
- Country: Sweden
- Province: Skåne
- County: Skåne County
- Municipality: Kristianstad Municipality

Area
  - Total: 3.73 km^{2} (1.44 sq mi)

Population (31 December 2010)
  - Total: 3,284
  - Density: 890/km^{2} (2,300/sq mi)
- Time zone: UTC+1 (CET)
  - Summer (DST): UTC+2 (CEST)

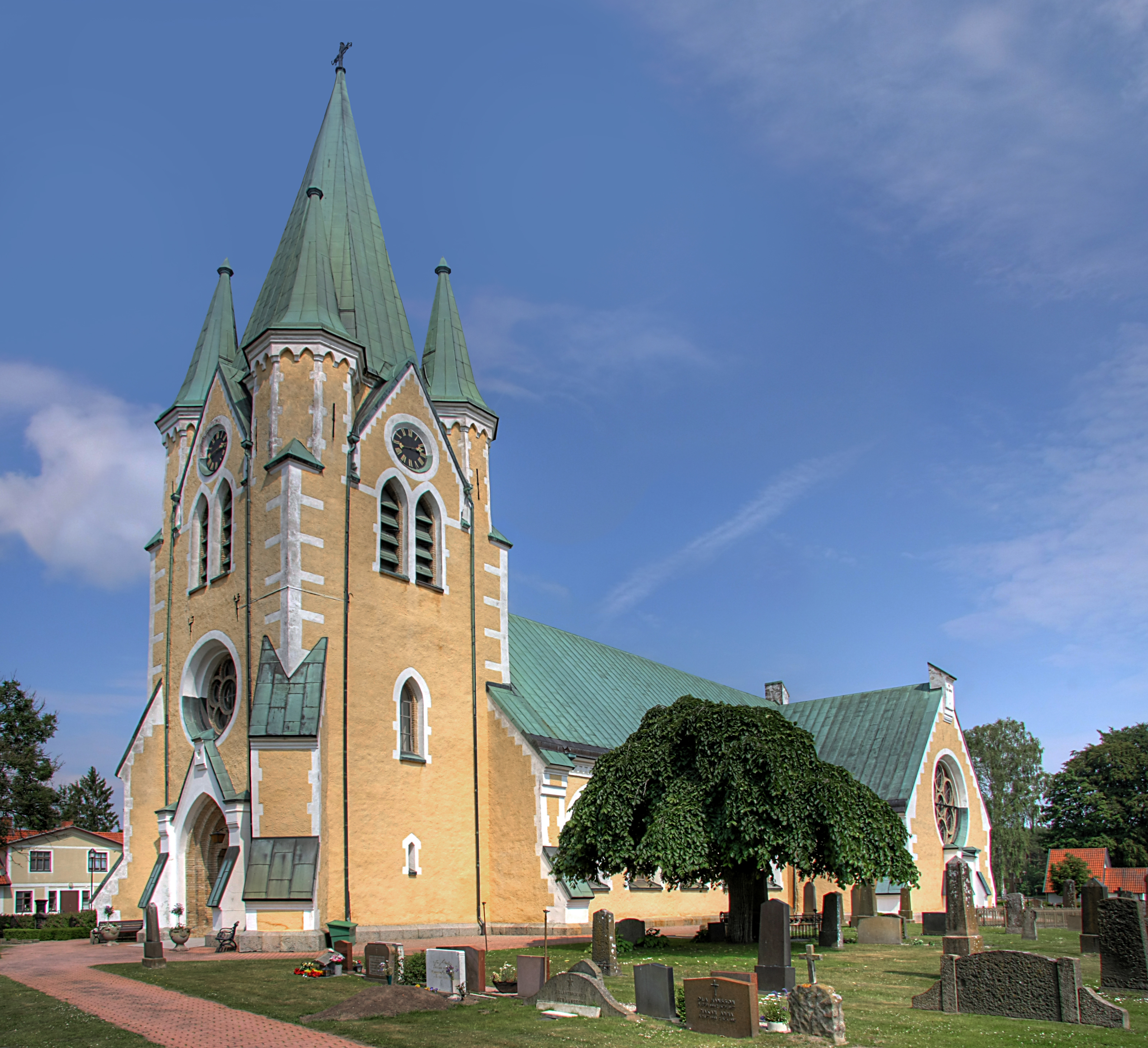
A church in Tollarp.

Tollarp (Swedish pronunciation: [ˈtɔ̂lːarp]) is a locality situated in Kristianstad Municipality, Skåne County, Sweden it had 3,284 inhabitants in 2010. It is located approximately 16 km (10 mi) south-west of the city of Kristianstad along the old European route E22 between Malmö and Kristianstad (Malmövägen).
