= Östra Sönnarslöv =

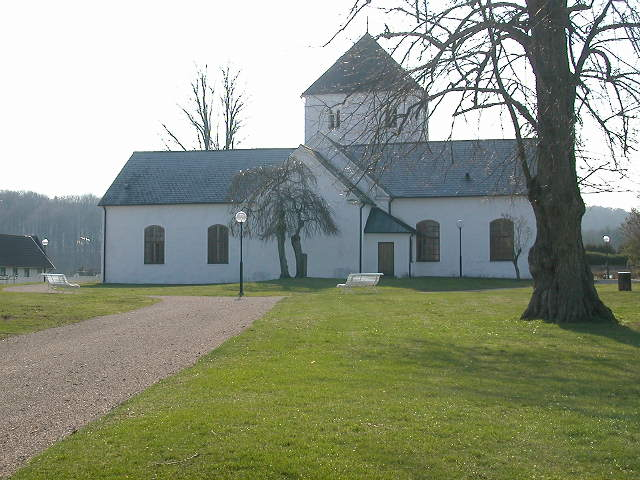
- Östra Sönnarslöv Church

- Location within Skåne Location within Sweden
- Coordinates: 55°53′N 14°01′E
- Country: Sweden
- Province: Skåne
- County: Skåne County
- Municipality: Kristianstad Municipality

Area
  - Total: 0.68 km^{2} (0.26 sq mi)

Population (31 December 2010)
  - Total: 294
  - Density: 431/km^{2} (1,120/sq mi)
- Time zone: UTC+1 (CET)
  - Summer (DST): UTC+2 (CEST)

Östra Sönnarslöv is a locality situated in Kristianstad Municipality, Skåne County, Sweden with 294 inhabitants in 2010.

Östra Sönnarslöv Church is a partially preserved medieval church with murals from the 15th century. It also contains the burial chapel of the Ramel family.
