= Lyngsjö Church =

- Lyngsjö kyrka
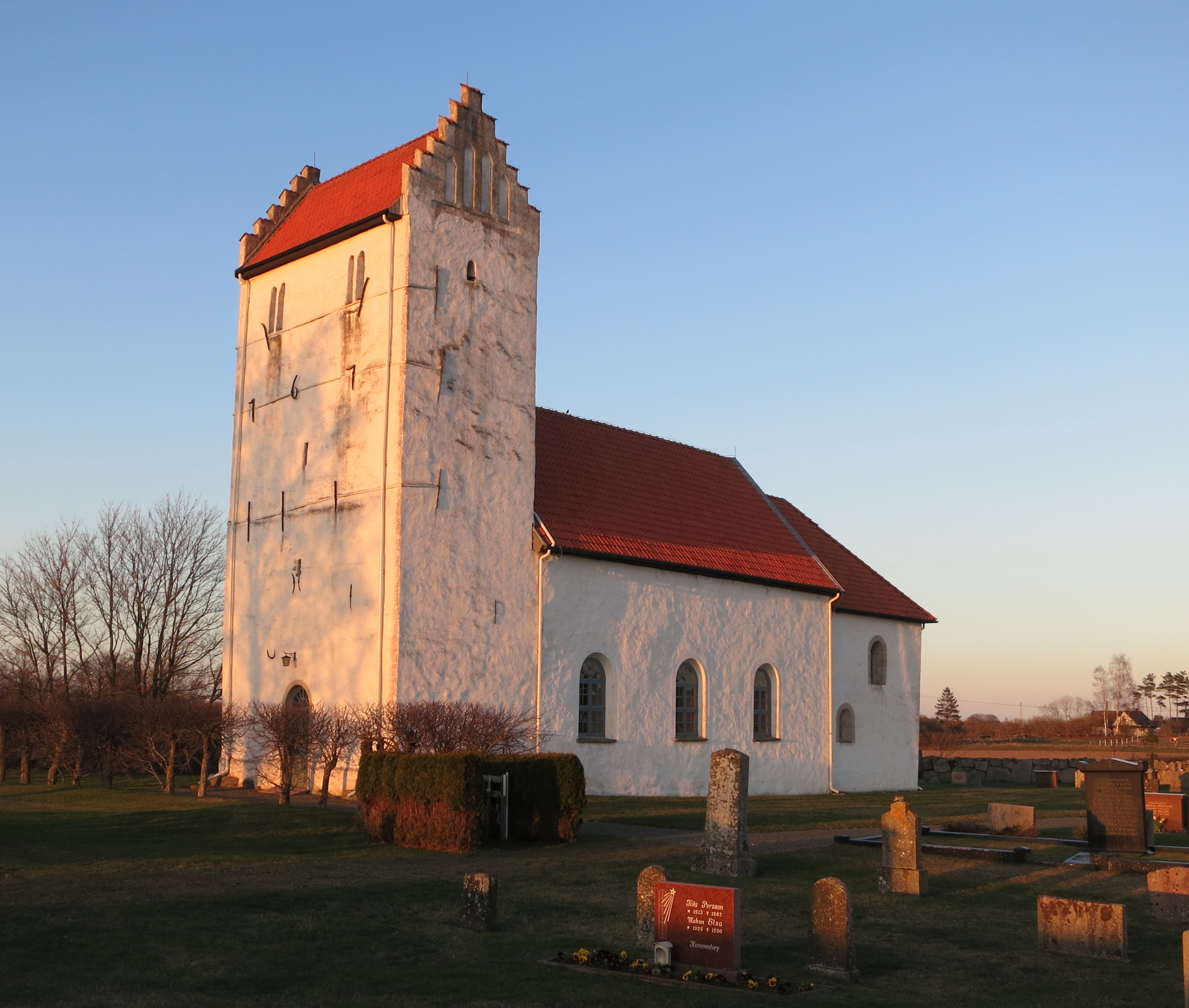
- Lyngsjö Church

- 55°56′07″N 14°04′17″E
- Country: Sweden
- Denomination: Church of Sweden

Lyngsjö Church (Swedish: Lyngsjö kyrka) is a medieval church in Lyngsjö, in the province of Skåne, Sweden. The well-preserved medieval church contains an unusual, Romanesque antependium of gilt copper of unknown origin.

== History and architecture ==
Lyngsjö Church was probably built during the 1140s in Romanesque style. The building material is fieldstone. From the beginning the church had a broad, western tower, a nave, choir and an apse. Originally the church ceiling was barrel vaulted but it was replaced by the presently visible Gothic vaults in the 15th century. The apse was demolished in 1796, and the entrances to the church altered. Unusually, Lyngsjö Church contains a small walled-up entrance, measuring 144 by 61 centimetres (57 in × 24 in), in the northern wall. It was used by criminals who had been sentenced to death; Lynsjö was between 1649 and 1750 centre of the hundred Gärds härad, and therefore both the location of the courthouse and the gallows serving the hundred. Convicted criminals were given the last rites in the church before being taken to be executed, but forced to use the smaller entrance to show their humility before the church. The last execution in Lyngsjö was carried out in 1836.

== Murals ==
The church contains fragments of medieval murals. They consist of two different sets. The oldest are possibly from the time when the church was built or from the 1190s. They were discovered during a renovation in 1953, and restored the following year. They depict religious scenes, including episodes from the life of Christ. A later mural on the wall separating the choir from the nave shows Saint Christopher. It has been dated to the 14th century.

== Antependium ==
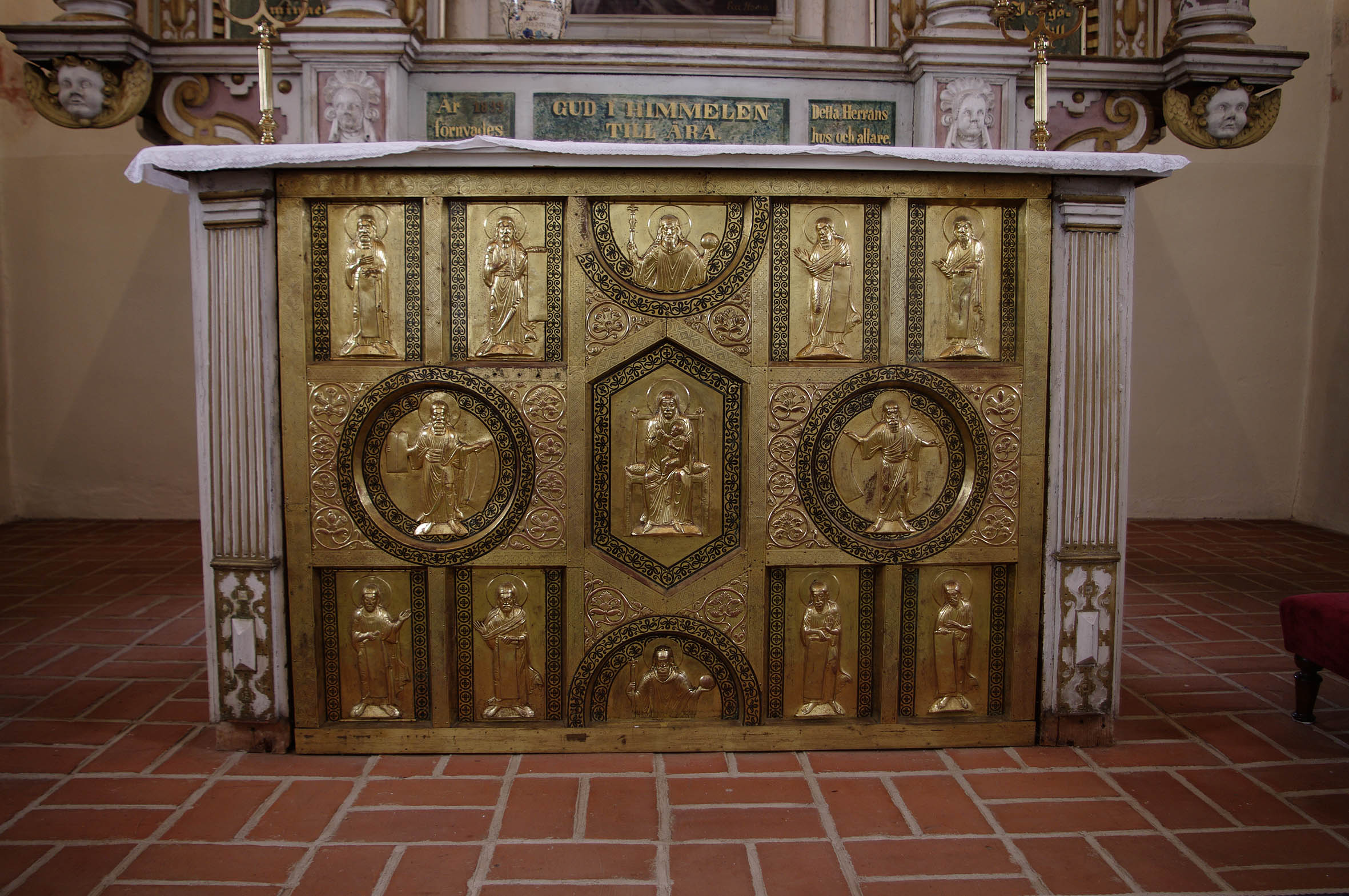
The golden antepedium of the church

Arguably the most unusual thing in the church is a richly decorated, gilt antependium or altar front. It is an unusually refined piece of art, unparalleled in its kind within the Nordic countries. According to art historian and former deputy head of Kulturen Claes Wahlöö, it would be "better suited for the high altar of a cathedral than a countryside church".

The antependium is made of gilt copper and contains 13 figures. The central panel displays Mary on a throne with the infant Christ in her lap. Above and below her the Old Testament kings Solomon and David are portrayed within semicircles. To the left of Mary is a portrayal of Aaron, and to her right Moses is depicted, both within circles. The other eight figures represent Prophets of Christianity. The antependium was displayed at the Baltic Exhibition in Malmö in 1914.

The origin of the antependium is unknown. The similarities with an antependium from the monastery of Comburg in southern Germany have been pointed out. It has been suggested that it may have been imported or perhaps manufactured locally by a goldsmith – perhaps Italian or German – working at the construction site of Lund Cathedral. It has been dated to between the 1150s and 1170s.

== Baptismal font ==
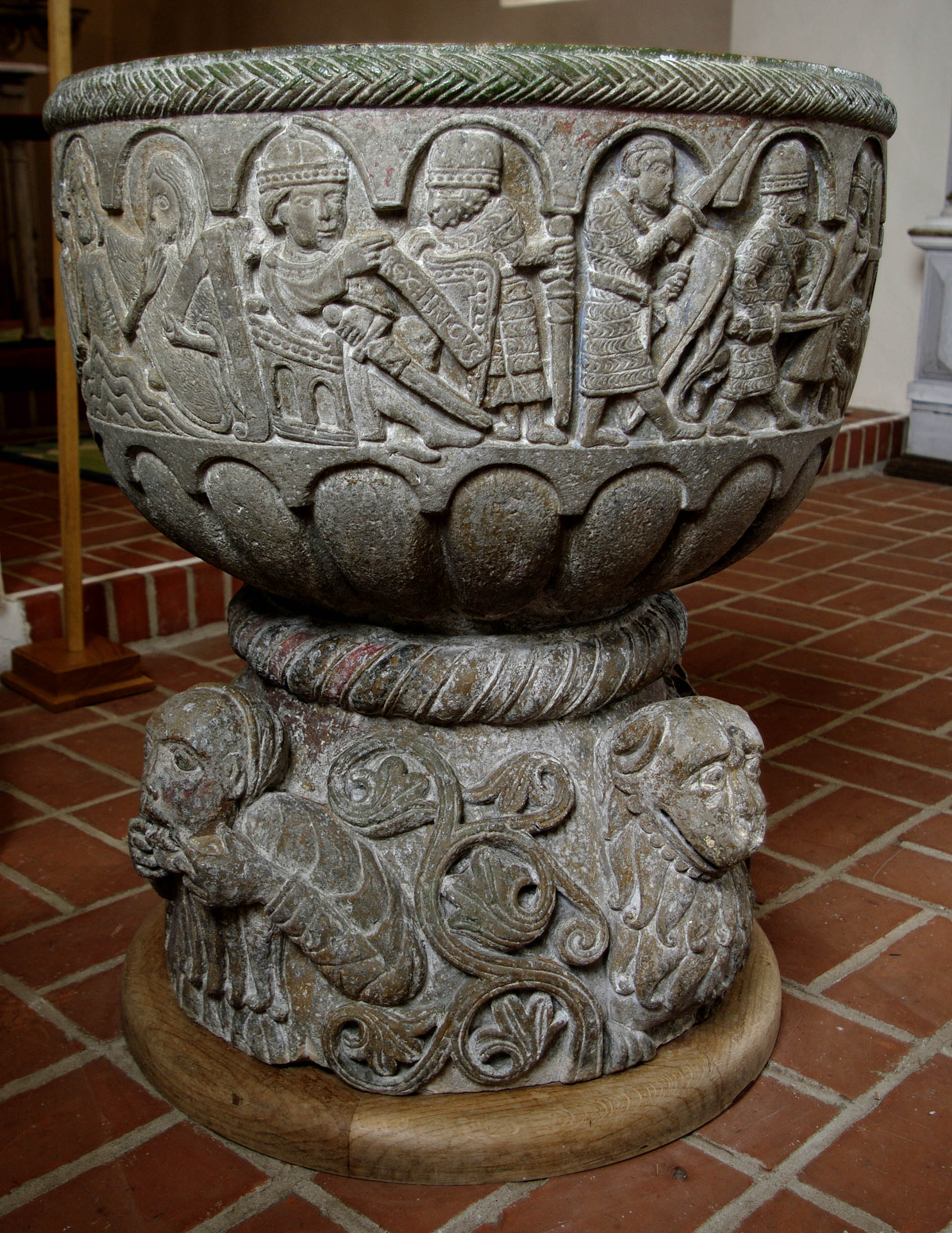
The baptismal font, depicting Henry II of England ordering the murder of Thomas Becket

Another unusual item in the church is the baptismal font. It is Romanesque in style, made of local sandstone and also dates from the end of the 12th century. The sculptor of the font has been presumed to have been the Romanesque sculptor known after a signature in another font as Tove. The richly decorated main sculptural element depicts the martyrdom of Thomas Becket. The choice of motif probably had a political significance and was not an isolated curiosity: a relic of Thomas Becket was taken to Gumlösa Church, also in Skåne, at about the same time.

The frieze running around the font displays the murder of Becket. Henry II of England is ordering the murder from his throne; to make his identity clear, the sculptor has made a little sign next to him with the inscription REX.HRICVS (interpreted as "King Henry" in Latin) A number of soldiers with drawn swords are moving towards Becket, and he is depicted falling down, struck by one of the soldiers. Behind him is an altar and another clerical figure with a cross; it has been interpreted as a depiction of either Edward Grim or Thomas Becket as a saint. The next scene shows Becket ascending to heaven. The rest of the sculptural decoration of the font depict traditional religious themes, such as the Coronation of the Virgin, as well as typically Romanesque grotesque beasts and imaginary animals.

== Other furnishings ==
The altarpiece of the church, placed behind the altar and the antependium, is a richly decorated piece from the 17th century. The pulpit was also made c. 1600. The church furthermore has two church bells. The larger one is from the 13th century while the smaller one was donated to the church by a former villager who had emigrated to the United States in the 19th century. It bears the inscription Åt Lyngby kyrka af Pehr S. Peterson, Chicago, A. D. 1889 ("To Lyngby sic Church from Pehr S. Peterson, Chicago, A. D. 1889"), and was made in New York.

== Holy spring ==
About 800 metres (870 yd) north of the church lies a spring that has been considered holy, probably since pre-Christian times. During the Middle Ages, it was associated with Saint Helena. As late as in the 18th century its waters were considered to have miraculous properties.
