= Viby, Kristianstad =

Viby
- Location within Skåne Location within Sweden
- Coordinates: 56°00′N 14°14′E
- Country: Sweden
- Province: Skåne
- County: Skåne County
- Municipality: Kristianstad Municipality

Area
  - Total: 1.05 km^{2} (0.41 sq mi)

Population (31 December 2010)
  - Total: 991
  - Density: 946/km^{2} (2,450/sq mi)
- Time zone: UTC+1 (CET)
  - Summer (DST): UTC+2 (CEST)

Viby is a locality situated in Kristianstad Municipality, Skåne County, Sweden with 991 inhabitants in 2010.
