= Vilshult =

- Location within Blekinge Location within Sweden
- Coordinates: 56°21′N 14°28′E
- Country: Sweden
- Province: Blekinge
- County: Blekinge County
- Municipality: Olofström Municipality

Area
  - Total: 0.83 km^{2} (0.32 sq mi)

Population (31 December 2010)
  - Total: 314
  - Density: 380/km^{2} (980/sq mi)
- Time zone: UTC+1 (CET)
  - Summer (DST): UTC+2 (CEST)

Vilshult (Swedish pronunciation: [ˈvǐːlshɵlt]) is a locality situated in Olofström Municipality, Blekinge County, Sweden with 314 inhabitants in 2010.
