= Jämshög =

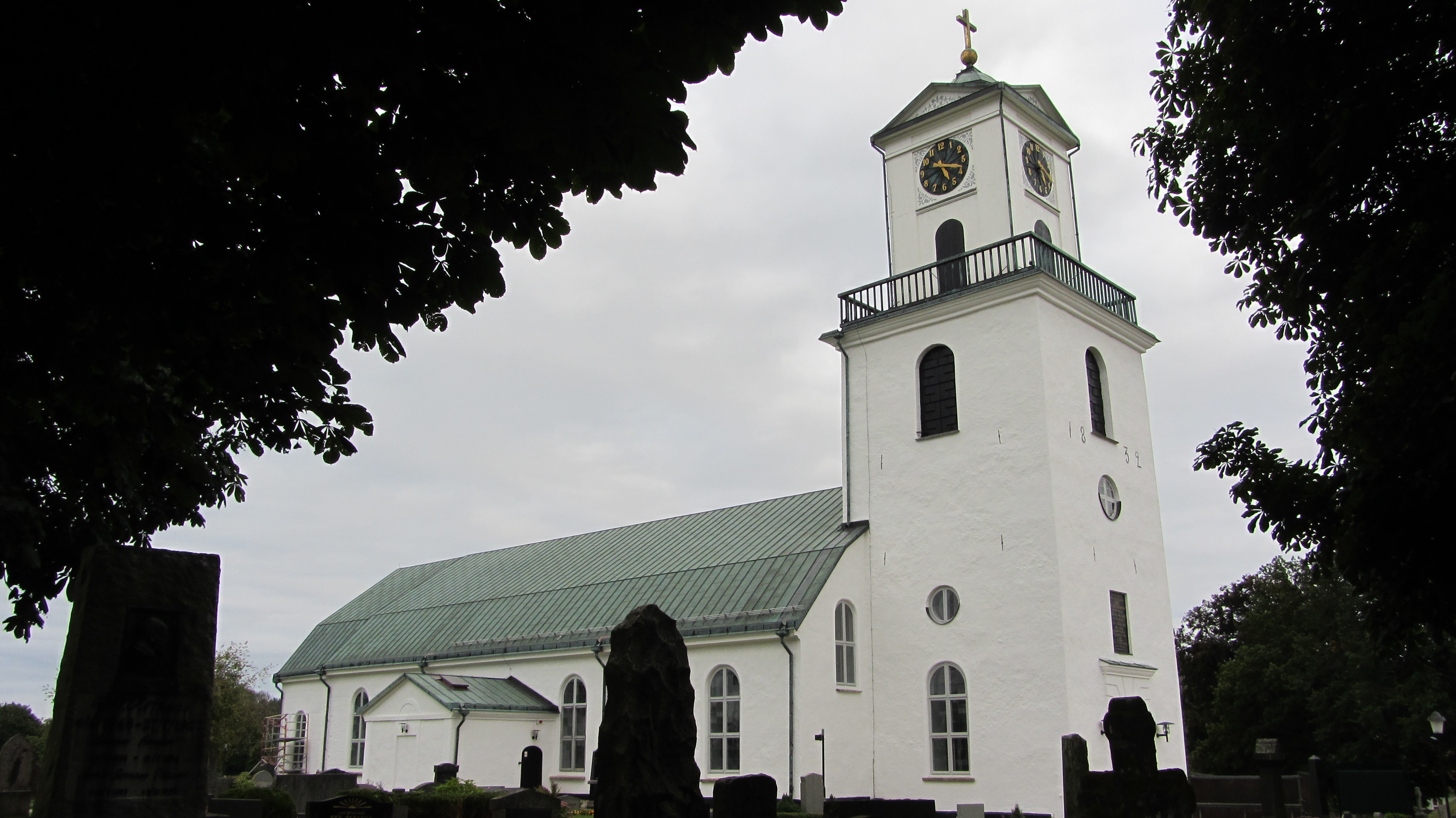
- Jämshög Church

- Location within Blekinge Location within Sweden
- Coordinates: 56°14′N 14°31′E
- Country: Sweden
- Province: Blekinge
- County: Blekinge County
- Municipality: Olofström Municipality

Area
  - Total: 1.62 km^{2} (0.63 sq mi)

Population (31 December 2010)
  - Total: 1,494
  - Density: 920/km^{2} (2,400/sq mi)
- Time zone: UTC+1 (CET)
  - Summer (DST): UTC+2 (CEST)

Jämshög is a locality situated in Olofström Municipality, Blekinge County, Sweden with 1,494 inhabitants in 2010.

It is the site of Jämshög Church (Jämshögs kyrka) in the Diocese of Lund. During the Northern Seven Years' War (1563 - 1570), the church was destroyed and when it was rebuilt with a sacristy was added in 1778. In 1803, the church and the surrounding village were extinguished when the belfry, the vicarage and seven farmhouses were totally destroyed. The present church began to be erected on June 20, 1804 after drawings by architect Olof Tempelman (1745-1816).

== Natives from Jämshög ==
- John Fredrik Anderson, engineer
- Kalle Berglund, middle-distance runner
- John Björkhem, Parapsychologist
- Nils Olof Holst, geologist
- Harry Martinson, author and nobel prize winner
- Axel de la Nietze, author
- Bengt Nordenberg, artist
- Sven Edvin Salje, author
- Pehr Thomasson, author
- Bertil Ronnmark, sport shooter
- Namasenda, singer

== Sports ==
The following sports clubs are located in Jämshög:

- Jämshögs IF
- Jämshög Saints
