= Kyrkhult =

- Location within Blekinge Location within Sweden
- Coordinates: 56°21′N 14°35′E
- Country: Sweden
- Province: Blekinge
- County: Blekinge County
- Municipality: Olofström Municipality

Area
  - Total: 1.17 km^{2} (0.45 sq mi)

Population (31 December 2010)
  - Total: 937
  - Density: 801/km^{2} (2,070/sq mi)
- Time zone: UTC+1 (CET)
  - Summer (DST): UTC+2 (CEST)

Kyrkhult is a locality situated in Olofström Municipality, Blekinge County, Sweden with 937 inhabitants in 2010.
