= Adam Bergqvist =

Swedish ice hockey player

- Born: April 25, 1993 (age 32) Sweden
- Height: 5 ft 9 in (175 cm)
- Weight: 181 lb (82 kg; 12 st 13 lb)
- Position: Defenceman
- Shot: Left
- Elitserien team: Brynäs IF
- NHL draft: Undrafted
- Playing career: 2012–2015

Adam Bergqvist (born April 25, 1993) is a Swedish ice hockey player. He made his Elitserien debut playing with Brynäs IF during the 2012–13 Elitserien season.
