= Peter Eskilsson =

Swedish painter

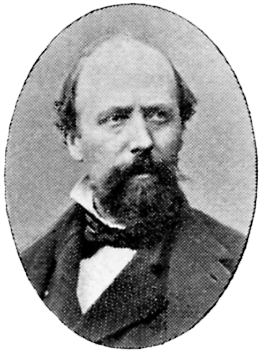
Portrait of Eskilsson from the Svenskt Porträttgalleri, published in 1901

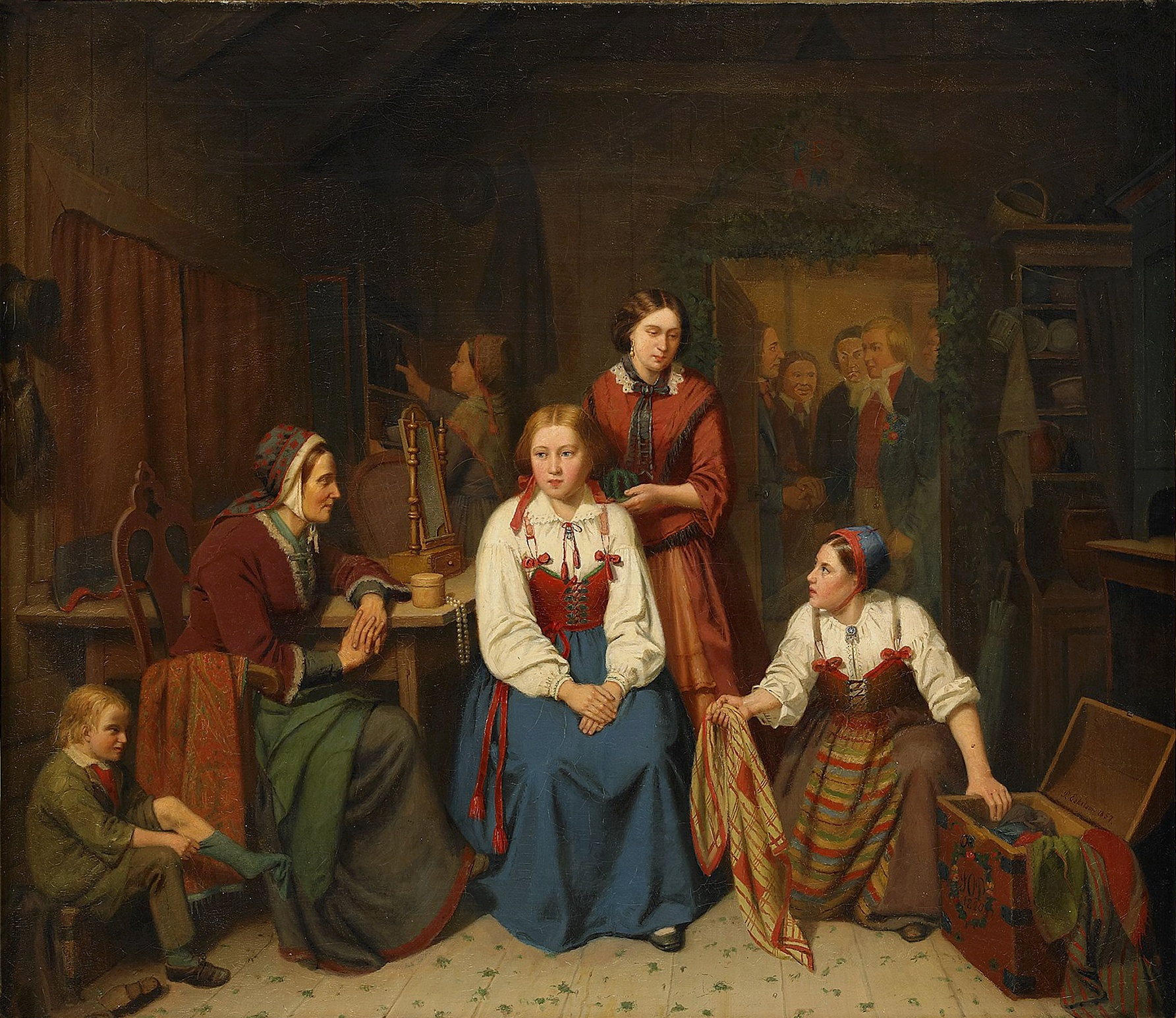
Wedding preparations, 1857

Peter (Per) Eskilson (28 September 1820 – 29 January 1872) was a Swedish genre painter.

== Biography ==
Eskilsson was born in the Billeberga parish, Scania, Sweden. His parents were Eskil Pehrsson and Elna Esbjörnsdotter. He was at first an under-officer in the Göta Artillery Regiment, and then a book-keeper at Gothenburg. After moving to Stockholm, he applied to the Royal Swedish Academy of Fine Arts where he studied from 1850-1853. He made his debut in 1853 at the Academy's exhibition. Through the assistance of Bengt Erland Dahlgren (1809-1876), who was a member of the Academy of Fine Arts, he was enabled in 1853 to go to Düsseldorf, where he studied under Adolph Tidemand.

He was compelled for a time to become a photographer and ran a photography studio in Stockholm from 1860. He participated in the Scandinavian art exhibition in Stockholm in 1866. He became an associate (agré) of the Royal Swedish Academy of Arts in 1866, and died at Bremö, near Sigtuna, in 1872.
