= Kristianstad Municipality =

Kristianstad Municipality Kristianstads kommun
- Municipality
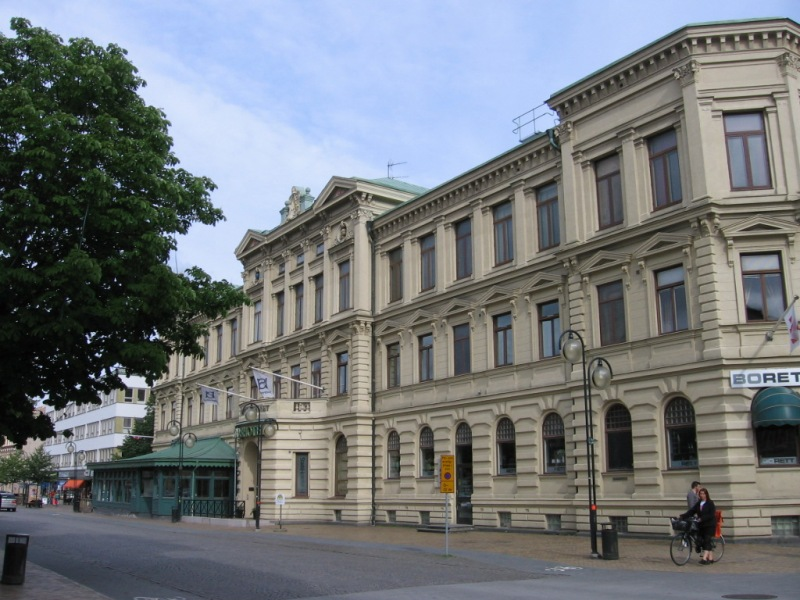
- Kristianstad City Hall

- Coat of arms

- Coordinates: 56°02′N 14°09′E
- Country: Sweden
- County: Skåne
- Seat: Kristianstad

Area
  - Total: 1,818.24 km^{2} (702.03 sq mi)
  - Land: 1,246.25 km^{2} (481.18 sq mi)
  - Water: 571.99 km^{2} (220.85 sq mi)
- Area as of 1 January 2014.

Population (30 June 2025)
  - Total: 86,293
  - Density: 69.242/km^{2} (179.34/sq mi)
- Time zone: UTC+1 (CET)
  - Summer (DST): UTC+2 (CEST)
- ISO 3166 code: SE
- Province: Scania
- Municipal code: 1290
- Website: www.kristianstad.se

Kristianstad Municipality (Swedish: Kristianstads kommun) is a municipality in Skåne County in southernmost Sweden. Its seat is located in the city Kristianstad.

The present municipality was created in three steps during the last nationwide local government reform, and it has the largest area of the municipalities of Skåne County. In 1967 a number of rural municipalities were merged into the City of Kristianstad. In 1971 more former units were added and the city became a unitary municipality. Finally in 1974, the last amalgamations took place, and the municipality reached its present size. The number of original entities (as of 1863) is 35.

== Geography ==
Its size of 1,818.24 square kilometres (702.03 sq mi) makes it the largest municipality in Skåne County by area.

=== Localities ===
There are 26 urban areas (Swedish: tätort, locality) in Kristianstad Municipality.

In the table, the urban areas are listed according to the size of the population as of December 31, 2020. The municipal seat is in bold characters.

#	Urban area	Population
1	**Kristianstad**	41,299
2	Åhus	10,487
3	Hammar	3,556
4	Tollarp	3,449
5	Fjälkinge	1,860
6	Färlöv	1,550
7	Önnestad	1,442
8	Degeberga	1,328
9	Viby	1,204
10	Everöd	925
11	Gärds Köpinge	920
12	Arkelstorp	791
13	Rinkaby	749
14	Yngsjö	717
15	Balsby	514
16	Österslöv	475
17	Linderöd	471
18	Bäckaskog	317
19	Nyehusen och Furuboda	310
20	Huaröd	267
21	Östra Sönnarslöv	265
22	Vånga	259
23	Bjärlöv	242
24	Vittskövle	239
25	Vanneberga	218
26	Skepparslöv	201

== Demographics ==
This is a demographic table based on Kristianstad Municipality's electoral districts in the 2022 Swedish general election sourced from SVT's election platform, in turn taken from SCB official statistics.

In total there were 86,502 residents, including 65,373 Swedish citizens of voting age. 37.5% voted for the left coalition and 61.0% for the right coalition. Indicators are in percentage points except population totals and income. Kristianstad was the most populated municipality in the country in which the Sweden Democrats won the most votes and the right coalition had an advantage of 12,610 votes.

Location	Residents	Citizen adults	Left vote	Right vote	Employed	Swedish parents	Foreign heritage	Income SEK	Degree
Location			%	%					
Bäckaskog	1,779	1,411	29.7	68.9	84	90	10	26,719	37
Centrum	2,314	1,849	39.0	57.9	71	61	39	21,560	42
Charlottesborg-Härlöv	2,058	1,398	51.2	47.5	68	41	59	20,846	29
Degeberga-Hörröd	2,412	1,911	33.3	65.5	80	90	10	24,339	34
Egna Hem-Parkstaden	1,713	1,399	35.0	63.6	80	79	21	27,411	54
Everödsbygden	1,593	1,229	31.8	67.2	80	87	13	23,510	32
Fjälkinge-Nymö	2,285	1,706	29.4	69.7	85	90	10	26,642	34
Färlöv	2,295	1,734	37.3	62.3	84	84	16	26,918	37
Gamlegården 1	2,503	1,220	74.3	15.5	44	10	90	10,125	22
Gamlegården 2	2,664	1,431	72.9	16.9	42	14	86	10,602	22
Gustav Adolf-Rinkaby	2,165	1,628	34.3	65.2	86	86	14	27,743	39
Hammar	1,509	1,193	38.0	61.0	83	76	24	26,908	43
Hammarslund-Araslöv	2,311	1,645	34.1	65.3	83	74	26	29,088	50
Hedentorp-Åsum	2,442	1,868	36.7	62.5	85	77	23	27,230	41
Kulltorp	1,822	1,338	39.8	58.9	83	70	30	28,753	53
Köpinge-Nöbbelöv	1,659	1,243	29.3	69.7	84	90	10	27,417	34
Lyckans Höjd	1,898	1,480	45.4	52.4	71	63	37	20,108	40
Nosaby	2,067	1,529	41.4	57.6	82	73	27	28,508	51
Näsby N	1,566	1,196	56.4	41.3	72	44	56	21,865	43
Näsby S	1,960	1,358	48.8	49.7	59	54	46	16,997	48
Oppmanna-Vånga	2,282	1,767	36.2	62.7	84	91	9	24,262	42
Sommarlust	1,445	1,137	40.5	58.1	82	78	22	24,898	49
Söder	2,060	1,724	38.4	60.4	80	72	28	24,205	45
Söder-Udden	2,227	1,831	42.6	55.1	72	70	30	22,202	41
Tollarp-Linderöd	2,412	1,838	31.0	68.3	83	88	12	23,993	33
Tollarp C-N	1,689	1,261	33.6	65.5	83	87	13	24,836	30
Tollarp C-S	1,337	992	31.7	66.8	75	80	20	21,307	30
Träne-Djurröd	1,579	1,221	27.5	71.6	84	91	9	27,439	40
Vilan-Långebro	1,872	1,378	47.7	51.0	69	55	45	20,985	34
Vä	2,618	1,887	31.6	68.0	87	87	13	29,002	48
Yngsjö-Vittskövle	2,317	1,987	34.4	64.7	81	92	8	25,350	43
Åhus C	2,032	1,693	31.8	67.8	82	91	9	25,701	49
Åhus Transval	1,241	1,052	35.6	63.6	82	91	9	24,700	39
Åhus Täppet	1,977	1,604	28.9	70.3	86	93	7	29,479	47
Åhus Vanneberg	1,622	1,467	28.1	71.4	89	95	5	30,561	52
Åhus Vattentornet	2,242	1,688	29.9	69.7	90	90	10	29,439	48
Åhus Äspet	1,800	1,546	26.0	73.4	84	94	6	32,952	61
Öllsjö	2,609	1,948	34.0	65.1	88	84	16	28,674	51
Önnestad-N Strö	2,262	1,655	32.9	65.8	82	86	14	26,663	37
Österslöv-Fjälkestad	1,553	1,173	34.7	64.2	83	91	9	28,728	47
Östermalm	1,858	1,597	40.0	58.4	79	75	25	25,814	47
Österäng	2,629	1,793	60.2	34.5	55	33	67	14,661	29
Östra Fäladen	1,824	1,368	47.4	50.1	71	59	41	19,650	35
Source: SVT

== International relations ==
=== Twin towns — Sister cities ===
The municipality is twinned with:

- Espoo, Finland
- Kongsberg, Norway
- Koszalin, Poland
- Køge Municipality, Denmark
- Rendsburg, Germany
- Šiauliai, Lithuania
- Skagafjörður, Iceland

== See also ==
- University College of Kristianstad
- Kristianstad County (abolished 1998)
- Söderportgymnasiet
