= 2014–15 HockeyAllsvenskan season =

- League: HockeyAllsvenskan
- Sport: Ice hockey
- Duration: 10 September 2014 – 2 April 2015
- Teams: 14
- Total attendance: 1,086,734
- Average attendance: 2,986
- TV partner: Viasat
- First place: VIK Västerås HK
- Top scorer: Jacob Lagace (ASP)
- Promoted to SHL: Karlskrona HK; Rögle BK; Malmö Redhawks
- Relegated to Hockeyettan: Södertälje SK

HockeyAllsvenskan seasons
- 2013–14 2015–16

The 2014–15 HockeyAllsvenskan season was the tenth season of the second tier of ice hockey in Sweden under that name. The league featured 14 teams, including Stockholm-based AIK, who were relegated from the SHL following four seasons in the top league. Also joining HockeyAllsvenskan was HC Vita Hästen, which marked the return of elite-level hockey to Norrköping. A previous Vita Hästen club had played in Sweden's second-tier league until the 1995–96 season, but following that club's bankruptcy in 1996, the new Vita Hästen club rebuilt from the bottom of the league system, culminating in their promotion back to the second tier in the 2014 HockeyAllsvenskan qualifiers.

Sweden's top league, the SHL, expanded from 12 to 14 teams for the 2015–16 season. This, coupled with changes to the promotion and relegation format, created an "arms race" type of situation, in which teams had a strong incentive to invest heavily to try to secure an SHL spot during this season.

== Format ==
As with previous seasons, the 2014–15 HockeyAllsvenskan season featured a 52-game regular season, with teams facing each other twice at home and twice away; however, significant changes were made to the format for promotion to the SHL. Teams 1 and 2 from HockeyAllsvenskan competed in the HockeyAllsvenskan finals (Swedish: HockeyAllsvenska finalen), a best-of-five series in which the winner qualified for play in the 2015–16 SHL season. Meanwhile, teams 3–8 advanced to the playoffs (Swedish: slutspelsserien), a single round robin tournament.

The three best teams from the playoff series, along with the loser from the HockeyAllsvenskan finals, and the two teams with the worst records from the 2014–15 SHL season, met in the SHL qualifiers (Swedish: Direktkval till SHL). These six teams were pair off into three best-of-seven series, with the winners of each matchup qualifying to play in the SHL. On 16 February 2015, HockeyAllsvenskan announced that the playoffs was to be sponsored by Swedish firm MECA and have the collective name MECA Hockey Race. This was later rejected by the Swedish Ice Hockey Association, saying they owned the naming rights.

== Participating clubs ==
2014–15 HockeyAllsvenskan teams

Team	City	Arena	Capacity
AIK	Stockholm	Hovet	8,094
Almtuna IS	Uppsala	Metallåtervinning Arena	2,800
Asplöven HC	Haparanda	Arena Polarica	1,500
IF Björklöven	Umeå	T3 Center	5,400
BIK Karlskoga	Karlskoga	Nobelhallen	6,300
Karlskrona HK	Karlskrona	Telenor Arena Karlskrona	3,464
IF Malmö Redhawks	Malmö	Malmö Arena	13,000
Mora IK	Mora	FM Mattsson Arena	4,514
IK Oskarshamn	Oskarshamn	Arena Oskarshamn	3,346
Rögle BK	Ängelholm	Lindab Arena	5,150
Södertälje SK	Södertälje	AXA Sports Center	6,130
Timrå IK	Timrå	E.ON Arena	6,000
VIK Västerås HK	Västerås	ABB Arena Nord	4,902
HC Vita Hästen	Norrköping	Himmelstalundshallen	4,280

== Regular season ==
=== Standings ===
Pos	Team	Pld	W	OTW	OTL	L	GF	GA	GD	Pts	Qualification or relegation
1	VIK Västerås	52	28	4	6	14	144	116	+28	98	Advance to the HockeyAllsvenskan finals
2	Karlskrona HK	52	26	8	2	16	159	124	+35	96	Advance to the HockeyAllsvenskan finals
3	Malmö Redhawks	52	25	7	6	14	168	122	+46	95	Advance to the playoffs
4	Rögle BK	52	22	6	7	17	158	140	+18	85	Advance to the playoffs
5	BIK Karlskoga	52	22	6	4	20	162	162	0	82	Advance to the playoffs
6	IF Björklöven	52	19	10	4	19	135	136	−1	81	Advance to the playoffs
7	Mora IK	52	22	3	7	20	130	141	−11	79	Advance to the playoffs
8	Vita Hästen	52	19	6	5	22	129	142	−13	74	Advance to the playoffs
9	Almtuna IS	52	20	3	8	21	130	146	−16	74	
10	Timrå IK	52	20	2	7	23	128	139	−11	71	
11	IK Oskarshamn	52	16	6	9	21	133	151	−18	69	
12	Asplöven HC	52	16	7	6	23	150	160	−10	68	
13	AIK	52	16	5	7	24	118	142	−24	65	Advance to the HockeyAllsvenskan qualifiers
14	Södertälje SK	52	10	10	5	27	123	146	−23	55	Advance to the HockeyAllsvenskan qualifiers

== Post-season ==
=== HockeyAllsvenskan finals ===
VIK Västerås HK and Karlskrona HK, as the first and second place teams from the regular season, advanced to the HockeyAllsvenskan finals (Swedish: HockeyAllsvenska finalen), a best-of-five series. Karlskrona HK won the series, and were thus crowned HockeyAllsvenskan champions and qualified for play in the 2015–16 SHL season. VIK Västerås HK meanwhile advanced to the SHL qualifiers.

==== VIK Västerås HK vs. Karlskrona HK ====
4 March	VIK Västerås HK	2–1	Karlskrona HK	ABB Arena	Recap
No scoring		First period	Erik Thorell 1 - 0:33
Dustin Johner 1 - 14:11		Second period	No scoring
Dustin Johner 2 - 17:18		Third period	No scoring
Jonatan Bjurö ( 15 saves / 16 shots )		Goalie stats	Patrick Galbraith ( 35 saves / 37 shots )

6 March	Karlskrona HK	3–1	VIK Västerås HK	Telenor Arena Karlskrona	Recap
Maksim Matushkin 1 - pp - 2:18; Niklas Lihagen 1 - pp - 12:56		First period	No scoring
No scoring		Second period	No scoring
Alexander Bergström 1 - pp - 14:47		Third period	Fredrik Johansson 1 - 19:49
Patrick Galbraith ( 38 saves / 39 shots )		Goalie stats	Jonatan Bjurö ( 19 saves / 22 shots )

8 March	VIK Västerås HK	3–4	2OT	Karlskrona HK	ABB Arena	Recap
Robin Jacobsson 1 - pp - 13:33; Jonas Emmerdahl 1 - 17:26		First period		No scoring
No scoring		Second period		Joel Kellman 1 - 2:02; Joel Kellman 2 - 9:23
Robin Jacobsson 2 - 17:53		Third period		Niklas Lihagen 2 - 0:11
No scoring		Second overtime period		Joel Kellman 3 - 10:50
Jonatan Bjurö ( 30 saves / 34 shots )		Goalie stats		Patrick Galbraith ( 60 saves / 63 shots )

10 March	Karlskrona HK	2–1	VIK Västerås HK	Telenor Arena Karlskrona	Recap
No scoring		First period	Dustin Johner 3 - 4:11
No scoring		Second period	No scoring
Joel Kellman 4 - pp - 13:04; Vyacheslav Trukhno 1 - 15:31		Third period	No scoring
Patrick Galbraith ( 21 saves / 22 shots )		Goalie stats	Jonas Fransson ( 34 saves / 36 shots )

Karlskrona HK won series 3–1

=== Playoffs ===
Teams 3 to 8 played a playoff series (Swedish: slutspelsserien), a round robin tournament consisting of five rounds where every team faced each other once. Teams 3–5 had home advantage in three out of five games. Teams were awarded starting points based on their position in the regular season standings: Malmö started with three points, Rögle with two, and BIK Karlskoga with one. The three best teams in the series, Rögle BK, HC Vita Hästen and Malmö Redhawks advanced to the SHL qualifiers (Swedish: Direktkval till SHL).

Pos	Team	Pld	W	OTW	OTL	L	GF	GA	GD	Pts	Qualification
1	Rögle BK	5	2	3	0	0	19	11	+8	14	Advance to SHL qualifiers
2	HC Vita Hästen	5	3	1	1	0	14	9	+5	12	Advance to SHL qualifiers
3	Malmö Redhawks	5	1	1	0	3	8	13	−5	8	Advance to SHL qualifiers
4	IF Björklöven	5	1	2	0	2	10	9	+1	7	Return to HockeyAllsvenskan for the 2015–16 season
5	Mora IK	5	1	0	3	1	12	13	−1	6	Return to HockeyAllsvenskan for the 2015–16 season
6	BIK Karlskoga	5	0	0	3	2	10	18	−8	4	Return to HockeyAllsvenskan for the 2015–16 season

=== SHL qualifiers ===
In the SHL qualifiers (Swedish: direktval till SHL), six teams were paired up into three best-of-seven series, where each series winner would qualify for play in the 2015–16 SHL season. Västerås, as winners of the HockeyAllsvenskan finals, were paired with playoff-winners Rögle BK. Modo, who finished 12th in the SHL, were paired with Vita Hästen who finished second in the HockeyAllsvenskan playoffs. Lastly, Leksands IF, who finished 11th in the SHL were paired with Malmö, who finished third in the HockeyAllsvenskan playoffs.

The better-ranked teams Leksand, Modo, and Västerås, had home venue advantage in games 1, 3, 5 and 7. Modo were the first team to win their series, beating Vita Hästen 4–0 on 25 March 2015 and therefore successfully defending their SHL spot. Four days later, on 29 March 2015, Rögle won their series against Västerås 4–1, and were promoted to the SHL. The series between Leksands IF and Malmö Redhawks went to a decisive game seven on 2 April 2015 in which Malmö Redhawks won and therefore also the series with 4–3. Malmö Redhawks were promoted to the SHL while Leksands IF lost their SHL spot.

==== Leksands IF vs. Malmö Redhawks ====
15 March	Leksands IF	3–4	Malmö Redhawks	Tegera Arena	Recap
Tomi Sallinen 1 - 2:15		First period	No scoring
Linus Hultström 1 - pp - 3:47		Second period	Björn Svensson 1 - pp - 12:05; Eric Himelfarb 1 - 19:55
Mattias Guter 1 - 1:23		Third period	Eric Himelfarb 2 - 12:50; Mattias Persson 1 - 18:30
Oscar Alsenfelt ( 26 saves / 30 shots )		Goalie stats	Niko Hovinen ( 19 saves / 22 shots )

18 March	Malmö Redhawks	2–3	OT	Leksands IF	Malmö Arena	Recap
Eric Himelfarb 3 - 4:57		First period		No scoring
Christoffer Forsberg 1 - 14:38		Second period		Linus Hultström 2 - pp - 18:52
No scoring		Third period		Linus Hultström 3 - 11:53
No scoring		First overtime period		Tomi Sallinen 2 - 13:41
Niko Hovinen ( 31 saves / 34 shots )		Goalie stats		Oscar Alsenfelt ( 26 saves / 28 shots )

21 March	Leksands IF	4–3	Malmö Redhawks	Tegera Arena	Recap
Mattias Guter 2 - 0:50		First period	No scoring
Mattias Guter 3 - 7:11; Patrick Cehlin 1 - 12:26		Second period	No scoring
Mattias Guter 4 - 8:15		Third period	Christoffer Forsberg 2 - 9:53; Nils Andersson 1 - 11:44; Magnus Häggström 1 - 16:06
Oscar Alsenfelt ( 30 saves / 33 shots )		Goalie stats	Niko Hovinen ( 19 saves / 23 shots )

24 March	Malmö Redhawks	3–1	Leksands IF	Malmö Arena	Recap
Jens Jakobs 1 - 1:00; Nicklas Jadeland 1 - pp - 11:19		First period	No scoring
No scoring		Second period	Kevin Kapstad 1 - 15:29
Nils Andersson 2 - 14:58		Third period	No scoring
Niko Hovinen ( 34 saves / 35 shots )		Goalie stats	Oscar Alsenfelt ( 33 saves / 36 shots )

27 March	Leksands IF	2–1	Malmö Redhawks	Tegera Arena	Recap
Tomi Sallinen 3 - pp - 14:57		First period	Eric Himelfarb 4 - 18:10
No scoring		Second period	No scoring
Patrick Cehlin 2 - 2:50		Third period	No scoring
Oscar Alsenfelt ( 24 saves / 25 shots )		Goalie stats	Niko Hovinen ( 31 saves / 33 shots )

30 March	Malmö Redhawks	6–3	Leksands IF	Malmö Arena	Recap
Jeremias Augustin 1 - 11:29; Nils Andersson 3 - pp - 13:59; Nicklas Jadeland 2 - 17:31		First period	Jon Knuts 2 - 12:46; Tomi Sallinen 4 - pp - 19:47
Mathias Tjärnqvist 1 - pp - 21:01		Second period	Patrick Cehlin 3 - 22:55
Jens Jakobs 2 - 52:36; Mathias Tjärnqvist 2 - 59:40		Third period	No scoring
Niko Hovinen ( 28 saves / 31 shots )		Goalie stats	Oscar Alsenfelt ( 21 saves / 26 shots )

2 April	Leksands IF	2–4	Malmö Redhawks	Tegera Arena	Recap
Jonas Frögren 1 - 12:59		First period	19:46 - Nils Andersson 4
Tomi Sallinen 5 - 15:29		Second period	6:44 - Jens Henrik Tönjum 1; 10:47 - Björn Svensson 2
No scoring		Third period	19:50 - en - Henrik Hetta 1
Oscar Alsenfelt ( 29 saves / 32 shots )		Goalie stats	Niko Hovinen ( 35 saves / 37 shots )

Malmö Redhawks won series 4–3

==== Modo Hockey vs. HC Vita Hästen ====
16 March	Modo Hockey	3–0	HC Vita Hästen	Fjällräven Center	Recap
No scoring		First period	No scoring
Donald Brashear 1 - pp - 1:01		Second period	No scoring
Juha-Pekka Haataja 1 - 5:49; Per-Åge Skrøder 1 - en - 18:04		Third period	No scoring
Linus Ullmark ( 19 saves / 19 shots )		Goalie stats	Henrik Lundberg ( 34 saves / 36 shots )

19 March	HC Vita Hästen	0–2	Modo Hockey	Himmelstalundshallen	Recap
No scoring		First period	Jonas Ahnelöv 1 - 18:56
No scoring		Second period	Marcel Hossa 1 - 3:59
No scoring		Third period	No scoring
Henrik Lundberg ( 39 saves / 41 shots )		Goalie stats	Linus Ullmark ( 24 saves / 24 shots )

22 March	Modo Hockey	4–1	HC Vita Hästen	Fjällräven Center	Recap
Simon Önerud 1 - 11:20		First period	No scoring
Marcel Hossa 2 - 10:16; Adrian Kempe 1 - 10:41		Second period	No scoring
Simon Önerud 2 - 9:58		Third period	Daniel Åhsberg 1 - pp - 11:55
Linus Ullmark ( 22 saves / 23 shots )		Goalie stats	Henrik Lundberg ( 26 saves / 30 shots )

25 March	HC Vita Hästen	1–4	Modo Hockey	Himmelstalundshallen	Recap
Wilhelm Westlund 1 - 10:17		First period	Samuel Påhlsson 1 - 9:34
No scoring		Second period	Emil Pettersson 1 - 1:08; Simon Önerud 3 - 1:33
No scoring		Third period	Peter Öberg 1 - 17:20
Henrik Lundberg ( 29 saves / 33 shots )		Goalie stats	Linus Ullmark ( 31 saves / 32 shots )

Modo Hockey won series 4–0

==== VIK Västerås HK vs. Rögle BK ====
17 March	VIK Västerås HK	3–4	Rögle BK	ABB Arena	Recap
No scoring		First period	Ludvig Rensfeldt 1 - pp - 3:27
Stefan Gråhns 1 - 3:14; Erik Andersson 1 - 13:17		Second period	Christopher Liljewall 1 - 3:43; Jordan Smotherman 1 - pp - 11:59
Stefan Gråhns 2 - pp - 14:42		Third period	Jordan Smotherman 2 - pp - 16:37
Jonas Fransson ( 20 saves / 24 shots )		Goalie stats	Lars Volden ( 44 saves / 47 shots )

20 March	Rögle BK	4–3	VIK Västerås HK	Lindab Arena	Recap
No scoring		First period	No scoring
Calle Rosén 1 - pp - 3:18; Sebastian Stålberg 1 - 6:39		Second period	No scoring
Ludvig Rensfeldt 2 - 4:40; Peter LeBlanc 1 - 6:41		Third period	Brock Montpetit 1 - 5:33; Jonte Berg 1 - 10:16; Eddie Davidsson 1 - 13:06
Lars Volden ( 25 saves / 28 shots )		Goalie stats	Jonas Fransson ( 18 saves / 22 shots )

23 March	VIK Västerås HK	3–0	Rögle BK	ABB Arena	Recap
Fredrik Johansson 1 - 10:52		First period	No scoring
Mikael Frycklund 1 - 4:13; Stefan Gråhns 3 - 19:45		Second period	No scoring
No scoring		Third period	No scoring
Jonas Fransson ( 38 saves / 38 shots )		Goalie stats	Lars Volden ( 24 saves / 27 shots )

26 March	Rögle BK	6–1	VIK Västerås HK	Lindab Arena	Recap
Daniel Sylwander 1 - 15:26		First period	Jeremy Williams 1 - 16:38
Niklas Hansson 1 - 4:24; Jakob Lilja 1 - 7:57; Peter LeBlanc 2 - 14:04		Second period	No scoring
Calle Rosén 2 - 3:28; Taylor Matson 1 - 11:49		Third period	No scoring
Lars Volden ( 34 saves / 35 shots )		Goalie stats	Jonas Fransson ( 23 saves / 29 shots )

29 March	VIK Västerås HK	0–2	Rögle BK	ABB Arena	Recap
No scoring		First period	No scoring
No scoring		Second period	Jesper Jensen 1 - 5:06
No scoring		Third period	Christopher Liljewall 2 - 12:38
Jonatan Bjurö ( 18 saves / 20 shots )		Goalie stats	Lars Volden ( 31 saves / 31 shots )

Rögle BK won series 4–1

== 2015 HockeyAllsvenskan qualifiers ==
AIK and Södertälje SK, ranked 13th and 14th after the regular season, were forced to defend their HockeyAllsvenskan spots against four teams from Hockeyettan in the 2015 HockeyAllsvenskan qualifiers (Swedish: Kvalserien till HockeyAllsvenskan). Joining them from Hockeyettan were AllEttan North winners IF Sundsvall, AllEttan South winners IK Pantern, and the two surviving teams from the Hockeyettan playoffs, Västerviks IK and Tingsryds AIF. These six teams played a double round-robin tournament, with the top four teams qualifying for play in HockeyAllsvenskan for the 2015–16 season. AIK defended their spot in the HockeyAllsvenskan while Södertälje SK were relegated to Hockeyettan. Tingsryds AIF, IK Pantern and IF Sundsvall Hockey were promoted to HockeyAllsvenskan.

Pos	Team	Pld	W	OTW	OTL	L	GF	GA	GD	Pts	Qualification
1	AIK	10	4	4	0	2	35	23	+12	20	Qualify for play in the 2015–16 HockeyAllsvenskan season
2	Tingsryds AIF (P)	10	5	0	2	3	37	28	+9	17	Qualify for play in the 2015–16 HockeyAllsvenskan season
3	IK Pantern (P)	10	5	1	0	4	26	29	−3	17	Qualify for play in the 2015–16 HockeyAllsvenskan season
4	IF Sundsvall (P)	10	4	1	1	4	19	22	−3	15	Qualify for play in the 2015–16 HockeyAllsvenskan season
5	Västerviks IK	10	3	0	2	5	17	29	−12	11	Qualify for play in the 2015–16 Hockeyettan season
6	Södertälje SK (R)	10	3	0	1	6	26	29	−3	10	Qualify for play in the 2015–16 Hockeyettan season

(P) Promoted; (R) Relegated
