= Alexander Bergström =

Swedish ice hockey player (born 1986)

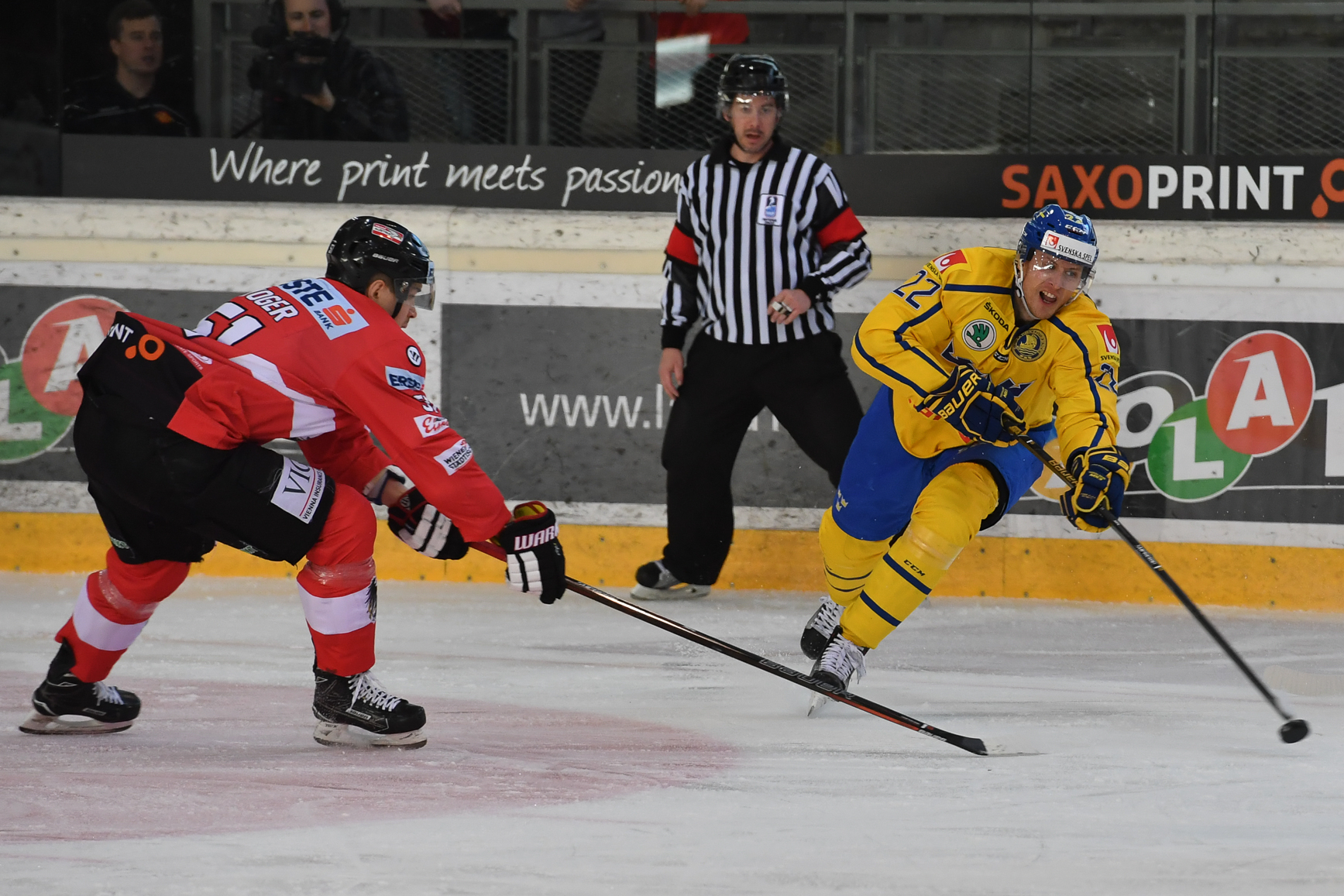
- Born: January 18, 1986 (age 40) Osby, Sweden
- Height: 6 ft 2 in (188 cm)
- Weight: 185 lb (84 kg; 13 st 3 lb)
- Position: Forward
- Shoots: Left
- Div.1 team Former teams: Karlskrona HK; Sibir Novosibirsk; Traktor Chelyabinsk; HV71; Krefeld Pinguine
- National team: Sweden
- Playing career: 2002–present

Alexander Bergström (born January 18, 1986) is a Swedish professional ice hockey forward. He is currently playing with Karlskrona HK of the Hockeyettan (Div.1).

== Playing career ==
Bergström after playing exclusively in the HockeyAllsvenskan belatedly made his Swedish Hockey League debut playing with Karlskrona HK during the 2015–16 SHL season.

After two seasons in the SHL, Bergström spent his first season abroad in Russia with HC Sibir Novosibirsk of the KHL in the 2017–18 season. Bergström left the club as a free agent, however opted to continue in the KHL, agreeing to one-year contract with Traktor Chelyabinsk on May 10, 2018.

== Career statistics ==
=== Regular season and playoffs ===
			Regular season					Playoffs
Season	Team	League	GP	G	A	Pts	PIM	GP	G	A	Pts	PIM
2002–03	Rögle BK	J20	27	4	5	9	24	—	—	—	—	—
2002–03	Rögle BK	Allsv	6	0	0	0	0	—	—	—	—	—
2003–04	Rögle BK	J20	31	10	15	25	8	—	—	—	—	—
2003–04	Rögle BK	Allsv	14	1	2	3	0	—	—	—	—	—
2004–05	Rögle BK	J20	23	7	13	20	8	—	—	—	—	—
2004–05	Rögle BK	Allsv	30	4	3	7	4	1	0	0	0	0
2004–05	Tyringe SoSS	Div.1	1	0	0	0	0	—	—	—	—	—
2005–06	Rögle BK	J20	19	6	9	15	20	—	—	—	—	—
2005–06	Rögle BK	Allsv	27	1	2	3	0	—	—	—	—	—
2005–06	Jonstorps IF	Div.1	14	5	4	9	6	—	—	—	—	—
2006–07	Olofströms IK	Div.1	41	26	34	60	34	—	—	—	—	—
2007–08	IK Oskarshamn	Allsv	43	13	15	28	16	—	—	—	—	—
2008–09	IK Oskarshamn	Allsv	45	12	19	31	20	—	—	—	—	—
2009–10	Borås HC	Allsv	48	14	18	32	16	—	—	—	—	—
2010–11	Borås HC	Allsv	52	16	33	49	24	—	—	—	—	—
2011–12	Rögle BK	Allsv	38	15	17	32	6	10	1	3	4	4
2012–13	Malmö Redhawks	Allsv	52	12	18	30	24	—	—	—	—	—
2013–14	Karlskrona HK	Allsv	40	21	19	40	8	6	1	4	5	2
2014–15	Karlskrona HK	Allsv	51	15	22	37	42	4	1	0	1	0
2015–16	Karlskrona HK	SHL	37	10	15	25	10	—	—	—	—	—
2016–17	Karlskrona HK	SHL	52	15	25	40	26	—	—	—	—	—
2017–18	Sibir Novosibirsk	KHL	55	21	20	41	10	—	—	—	—	—
2018–19	Traktor Chelyabinsk	KHL	41	4	12	16	14	4	0	1	1	0
2019–20	HV71	SHL	38	9	22	31	8	—	—	—	—	—
2020–21	HV71	SHL	44	8	27	35	12	—	—	—	—	—
2021–22	Krefeld Pinguine	DEL	31	14	17	31	10	—	—	—	—	—
Allsv totals			446	124	168	292	160	21	3	7	10	6
SHL totals			171	42	89	131	56	—	—	—	—	—
KHL totals			96	25	32	57	24	4	0	1	1	0

=== International ===
Year	Team	Event	Result	GP	G	A	Pts	PIM
2018	Sweden	OG	5th	4	0	1	1	0
Senior totals				4	0	1	1	0
