= Fredrik Johansson (ice hockey) =

Swedish ice hockey player (born 1984)

- Born: February 27, 1984 (age 42) Munkedal, Sweden
- Height: 6 ft 0 in (183 cm)
- Weight: 190 lb (86 kg; 13 st 8 lb)
- Position: Centre
- Shot: Left
- NHL team (P) Cur. team: Edmonton Oilers; VIK Västerås HK (HockeyAllsvenskan)
- NHL draft: 274th overall, 2002; Edmonton Oilers
- Playing career: 2002–2021

Per Fredrik Johansson (born February 27, 1984) is a Swedish former professional ice hockey centre who last played for VIK Västerås HK in HockeyAllsvenskan.

== Playing career ==
In 2002, Johansson was drafted in the ninth round, 274th overall, by the Edmonton Oilers in the 2002 NHL entry draft. He made his Swedish Hockey League (SHL) debut during the 2002–03 season. Johansson was selected to represent Team Sweden at the 2004 World Junior Ice Hockey Championships. On 1 June 2006, the Edmonton Oilers signed Johansson to an entry-level contract, and he was later re-assigned to Frölunda HC of the Swedish Elitserien.

On 26 September 2007, Johansson was assigned to the Oilers American Hockey League (AHL) affiliate, the Springfield Falcons, to begin the 2007–08 season. He was later assigned to their ECHL affiliate, the Stockton Thunder. The following season, Johansson returned to VIK Västerås HK.

As a result of abdominal muscle surgery, Johansson recorded limited playing time during the 2011–12 and 2012–13 seasons. He returned to the ice in August 2013.

Johansson was named captain of VIK Västerås HK in January 2016. During the 2018–19 season, Johansson recorded his 200th point during a 2–1 win over the Vita Hästen. Johansson agreed to a one-year contract extension with VIK Västerås HK in February 2019.

== Personal life ==
In August 2013, Johansson revealed his daughter had leukemia. He started a Children's Cancer Foundation fundraiser, which raised around SEK 150,000.

His cousin Joakim Andersson also plays professional hockey.

== Career statistics ==
=== Regular season and playoffs ===
			Regular season					Playoffs
Season	Team	League	GP	G	A	Pts	PIM	GP	G	A	Pts	PIM
2000–01	Västra Frölunda HC	J18 Allsv	5	5	1	6	0	1	0	0	0	2
2000–01	Västra Frölunda HC	J20	17	2	3	5	6	5	1	1	2	2
2001–02	Västra Frölunda HC	J18 Allsv	1	0	1	1	0	3	2	5	7	2
2001–02	Västra Frölunda HC	J20	37	12	20	32	37	5	1	3	4	2
2002–03	Västra Frölunda HC	J20	30	13	34	47	24	3	0	2	2	2
2002–03	Västra Frölunda HC	SEL	9	0	0	0	2	5	0	0	0	0
2003–04	Västra Frölunda HC	J20	7	1	2	3	4	4	2	4	6	0
2003–04	Västra Frölunda HC	SEL	48	1	3	4	6	10	0	0	0	0
2003–04	Halmstad Hammers HC	Allsv	1	0	0	0	0	—	—	—	—	—
2004–05	Västerås IK	Allsv	46	15	15	30	32	5	0	3	3	8
2005–06	Västerås IK	Allsv	41	7	15	22	26	—	—	—	—	—
2006–07	Frölunda HC	J20	1	1	1	2	2	—	—	—	—	—
2006–07	Frölunda HC	SEL	53	1	4	5	20	—	—	—	—	—
2007–08	Springfield Falcons	AHL	25	4	1	5	8	—	—	—	—	—
2007–08	Stockton Thunder	ECHL	37	5	13	18	16	—	—	—	—	—
2008–09	Västerås IK	Allsv	45	12	13	25	42	9	0	2	2	6
2009–10	Västerås IK	Allsv	42	10	12	22	22	—	—	—	—	—
2010–11	Västerås IK	Allsv	44	6	27	33	22	6	0	1	1	0
2011–12	Västerås IK	Allsv	7	3	2	5	2	—	—	—	—	—
2013–14	Västerås IK	Allsv	45	6	6	12	46	7	2	1	3	25
2014–15	Västerås IK	Allsv	52	14	11	25	12	9	2	0	2	2
2015–16	Västerås IK	Allsv	36	8	17	25	20	—	—	—	—	—
2016–17	Västerås IK	Allsv	52	12	15	27	24	10	1	1	2	2
2017–18	Västerås IK	SWE.3	40	21	17	38	30	16	7	5	12	8
2018–19	Västerås IK	Allsv	52	12	14	26	28	5	0	2	2	2
2019–20	Västerås IK	Allsv	51	7	12	19	26	1	0	1	1	0
2020–21	Västerås IK	Allsv	52	8	15	23	36	3	2	2	4	4
SEL totals			110	2	7	9	28	15	0	0	0	0
Allsv totals			566	120	174	294	338	55	7	13	20	49

=== International ===
Year	Team	Event	GP	G	A	Pts	PIM
2002	Sweden	WJC18	8	1	0	1	2
2004	Sweden	WJC	6	2	2	4	6
Junior totals			14	3	2	5	8
