= Dustin Johner =

Canadian ice hockey player (born 1983)

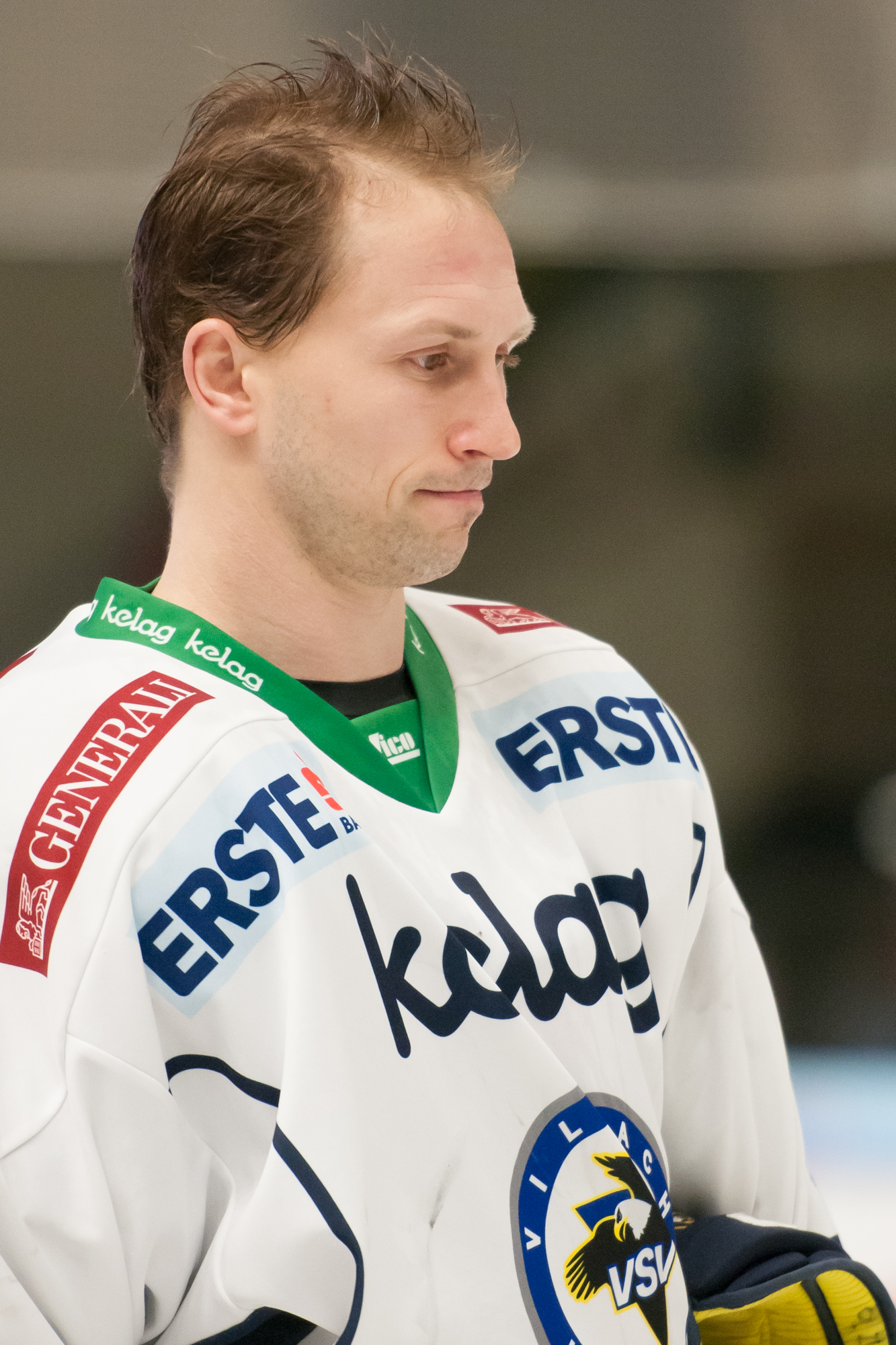
- Born: March 6, 1983 (age 43) Estevan, Saskatchewan, Canada
- Height: 5 ft 11 in (180 cm)
- Weight: 180 lb (82 kg; 12 st 12 lb)
- Position: Centre
- Shot: Right
- Played for: Lowell Lock Monsters; Omaha Ak-Sar-Ben Knights; Rochester Americans; ZSC Lions; HC TWK Innsbruck; Ilves; Heilbronner Falken; Växjö Lakers; Tingsryds AIF; Djurgårdens IF; VIK Västerås HK; EC VSV; Belfast Giants
- NHL draft: 169th overall, 2001; Florida Panthers
- Playing career: 2004–2019

Dustin Johner (born March 6, 1983) is a Canadian former professional ice hockey player. Johner was selected by the Florida Panthers in the 6th round (169th overall) of the 2001 NHL entry draft.

== Playing career ==
Johner joined Stockholm-based Djurgårdens IF for the 2012–13 season on a one-year contract. On April 11, 2013, Johner had extended his contract with Djurgården which would see him return to play with the team for the 2013–14 season. Djurgården was promoted to the Swedish Hockey League for the 2014–15 SHL season, and Johner's contract was not extended. He joined HockeyAllsvenskan team VIK Västerås HK in May 2014.

After five seasons in Sweden, on April 28, 2015, Johner moved to the Austrian league as a free agent, signing a one-year contract with EC VSV of the EBEL. In his second season with VSV in the 2016–17 season, Johner bettered is offensive production from the previous season with 39 points in 54 games. With Villach falling out of playoff contention, Johner was not tendered a contract to remain with the club.

On July 20, 2017, Johner penned a deal with the Belfast Giants of the UK's EIHL.

== Career statistics ==
| | | | Regular season | | | | | Playoffs |
| Season | Team | League | GP | G | A | Pts | PIM | GP | G | A | Pts | PIM |
|---|---|---|---|---|---|---|---|---|---|---|---|---|
| 1998–99 | Red Deer Rebels AAA | AMBHL | 36 | 35 | 29 | 64 | 42 | — | — | — | — | — |
| 1999–2000 | Red Deer Chiefs AAA | AMHL | 36 | 24 | 31 | 55 | 32 | — | — | — | — | — |
| 1999–2000 | Seattle Thunderbirds | WHL | 6 | 0 | 1 | 1 | 0 | — | — | — | — | — |
| 2000–01 | Seattle Thunderbirds | WHL | 72 | 25 | 31 | 56 | 45 | 9 | 1 | 5 | 6 | 6 |
| 2001–02 | Seattle Thunderbirds | WHL | 71 | 33 | 48 | 81 | 71 | 8 | 4 | 3 | 7 | 8 |
| 2002–03 | Seattle Thunderbirds | WHL | 71 | 36 | 41 | 77 | 97 | 15 | 7 | 6 | 13 | 14 |
| 2003–04 | Seattle Thunderbirds | WHL | 71 | 26 | 31 | 57 | 54 | — | — | — | — | — |
| 2003–04 | South Carolina Stingrays | ECHL | 4 | 2 | 4 | 6 | 0 | 7 | 4 | 3 | 7 | 4 |
| 2004–05 | Lowell Lock Monsters | AHL | 23 | 4 | 8 | 12 | 12 | 11 | 1 | 0 | 1 | 4 |
| 2004–05 | Las Vegas Wranglers | ECHL | 51 | 22 | 26 | 48 | 42 | — | — | — | — | — |
| 2005–06 | Omaha Ak–Sar–Ben Knights | AHL | 5 | 0 | 0 | 0 | 2 | — | — | — | — | — |
| 2005–06 | Las Vegas Wranglers | ECHL | 9 | 2 | 2 | 4 | 8 | — | — | — | — | — |
| 2005–06 | Rochester Americans | AHL | 16 | 1 | 1 | 2 | 8 | — | — | — | — | — |
| 2005–06 | Florida Everblades | ECHL | 36 | 15 | 21 | 36 | 24 | 8 | 5 | 4 | 9 | 4 |
| 2006–07 | Rochester Americans | AHL | 2 | 0 | 0 | 0 | 0 | — | — | — | — | — |
| 2006–07 | Florida Everblades | ECHL | 67 | 29 | 35 | 64 | 66 | 16 | 7 | 6 | 13 | 12 |
| 2007–08 | ZSC Lions | NLA | 16 | 4 | 6 | 10 | 8 | 1 | 0 | 0 | 0 | 0 |
| 2007–08 | GCK Lions | SUI.2 | 28 | 22 | 14 | 36 | 60 | 4 | 0 | 6 | 6 | 4 |
| 2008–09 | HC TWK Innsbruck | AUT | 54 | 15 | 33 | 48 | 56 | 6 | 2 | 2 | 4 | 4 |
| 2009–10 | Ilves | SM-liiga | 2 | 0 | 0 | 0 | 2 | — | — | — | — | — |
| 2009–10 | Heilbronner Falken | GER.2 | 35 | 18 | 29 | 47 | 57 | 6 | 2 | 4 | 6 | 2 |
| 2010–11 | Växjö Lakers | Allsv | 47 | 13 | 23 | 36 | 26 | 10 | 3 | 5 | 8 | 2 |
| 2011–12 | Tingsryds AIF | Allsv | 50 | 23 | 18 | 41 | 40 | — | — | — | — | — |
| 2012–13 | Djurgårdens IF | Allsv | 45 | 19 | 16 | 35 | 38 | 6 | 4 | 1 | 5 | 2 |
| 2013–14 | Djurgårdens IF | Allsv | 52 | 17 | 20 | 37 | 24 | 8 | 1 | 2 | 3 | 2 |
| 2014–15 | VIK Västerås HK | Allsv | 51 | 23 | 23 | 46 | 63 | 9 | 3 | 0 | 3 | 4 |
| 2015–16 | EC VSV | AUT | 54 | 16 | 19 | 35 | 40 | 11 | 4 | 0 | 4 | 10 |
| 2016–17 | EC VSV | AUT | 54 | 13 | 26 | 39 | 35 | — | — | — | — | — |
| 2017–18 | Belfast Giants | EIHL | 19 | 3 | 7 | 10 | 18 | — | — | — | — | — |
| 2018–19 | Belfast Giants | EIHL | 58 | 23 | 23 | 46 | 41 | 4 | 1 | 1 | 2 | 0 |
| ECHL totals | | | 167 | 70 | 88 | 158 | 140 | 31 | 16 | 13 | 29 | 20 |
| Allsv totals | | | 245 | 95 | 100 | 195 | 191 | 33 | 11 | 8 | 19 | 10 |
| AUT totals | | | 162 | 44 | 78 | 122 | 131 | 17 | 6 | 2 | 8 | 14 |
