= Robin Persson =

Swedish ice hockey player

- Born: December 5, 1985 (age 40) Nyköping, Sweden
- Height: 5 ft 9 in (175 cm)
- Weight: 187 lb (85 kg; 13 st 5 lb)
- Position: Defence
- Shot: Left
- Played for: IK Nyköpings NH 90; Västerås IK; Surahammars IF; IK Oskarshamn; Linköpings HC; Timrå IK; Karlskrona HK
- NHL draft: Undrafted
- Playing career: 2003–2017

Robin Persson (born December 5, 1985) is a Swedish professional ice hockey defenceman who currently plays for Timrå IK of the Swedish Elitserien.

Persson is originally from Nyköping and through junior and senior hockey in Västerås. He has premier league play with Nyköping and Oskarshamn. He made his Elitserien debut with Linköpings HC near the end of the 2008–09 season and has stayed with this elite hockey team to the end of the 2011–12 season.

== Career statistics ==
			Regular season					Playoffs
Season	Team	League	GP	G	A	Pts	PIM	GP	G	A	Pts	PIM
2001–02	IK Nyköpings NH 90	Allsvenskan	23	0	0	0	0	—	—	—	—	—
2002–03	IK Nyköpings NH 90	Allsvenskan	19	0	3	3	2	—	—	—	—	—
2003–04	Västerås IK	Division 1	20	3	3	6	16	—	—	—	—	—
2003–04	VIK Hockey Ungdom J20	J20 Elit	—	—	—	—	—	3	1	0	1	2
2003–04	VIK Hockey Ungdom	Allsvenskan	6	1	1	2	0	—	—	—	—	—
2004–05	VIK Hockey Ungdom J20	J20 SuperElit	21	3	6	9	24	—	—	—	—	—
2004–05	VIK Hockey Ungdom	Allsvenskan	26	2	2	4	2	5	0	0	0	0
2004–05	Surahammars IF	Division 1	7	1	1	2	12	—	—	—	—	—
2005–06	VIK Västerås HK	HockeyAllsvenskan	42	1	6	7	30	—	—	—	—	—
2006–07	VIK Västerås HK	HockeyAllsvenskan	45	3	16	19	72	2	0	0	0	0
2007–08	Nyköpings HK	HockeyAllsvenskan	45	3	10	13	76	—	—	—	—	—
2008–09	IK Oskarshamn	HockeyAllsvenskan	34	3	5	8	24	—	—	—	—	—
2008–09	Linköping HC	Elitserien	8	0	0	0	6	5	0	0	0	2
2009–10	Linköping HC	Elitserien	55	2	5	7	34	4	0	1	1	0
2010–11	Linköping HC	Elitserien	42	0	6	6	16	7	0	0	0	6
2011–12	Linköping HC	Elitserien	39	0	3	3	26	—	—	—	—	—
2012–13	Timrå IK	Elitserien	39	1	3	4	18	—	—	—	—	—
2013–14	Timrå IK	HockeyAllsvenskan	50	2	5	7	81	—	—	—	—	—
2014–15	Timrå IK	HockeyAllsvenskan	47	1	7	8	44	—	—	—	—	—
2015–16	Karlskrona HK	SHL	46	1	1	2	28	—	—	—	—	—
2016–17	Timrå IK	HockeyAllsvenskan	31	0	1	1	18	5	0	0	0	6
SHL (Elitserien) totals			229	4	18	22	128	16	0	1	1	8
HockeyAllsvenskan totals			294	13	50	63	345	7	0	0	0	6
Allsvenskan totals			74	3	6	9	4	5	0	0	0	0
