= Robin Jacobsson (ice hockey) =

Swedish ice hockey player

- Born: August 10, 1986 (age 39) Stockholm, Sweden
- Height: 6 ft 3 in (191 cm)
- Weight: 220 lb (100 kg; 15 st 10 lb)
- Position: Defense
- Shot: Left
- Played for: Luleå HF; Brynäs IF; Leksands IF; KooKoo; Graz 99ers
- Playing career: 2006–2021

Robin Jacobsson (born August 10, 1986) is a Swedish former professional ice hockey defenseman who last played in the HockeyAllsvenskan (Allsv) for AIK IF. He made his Elitserien debut playing with Luleå HF during the 2012–13 season.

== Career statistics ==
			Regular season					Playoffs
Season	Team	League	GP	G	A	Pts	PIM	GP	G	A	Pts	PIM
2004–05	Hammarby Hockey J20	J20 SuperElit	28	0	0	0	6	—	—	—	—	—
2004–05	Skå IK	Division 2	1	0	0	0	0	—	—	—	—	—
2005–06	Hammarby Hockey J20	J20 SuperElit	39	3	8	11	126	4	0	0	0	14
2005–06	Hammarby Hockey	HockeyAllsvenskan	—	—	—	—	—	—	—	—	—	—
2006–07	Nybro Vikings IF	HockeyAllsvenskan	38	0	0	0	14	—	—	—	—	—
2006–07	Tingsryds AIF	Division 1	7	1	0	1	4	—	—	—	—	—
2007–08	Kiruna IF	Division 1	32	7	11	18	87	—	—	—	—	—
2008–09	Tingsryds AIF	Division 1	39	3	4	7	93	10	0	4	4	24
2009–10	Tingsryds AIF	Division 1	40	6	13	19	93	10	2	4	6	33
2010–11	Tingsryds AIF	HockeyAllsvenskan	44	4	12	16	58	—	—	—	—	—
2011–12	Tingsryds AIF	HockeyAllsvenskan	50	9	10	19	67	—	—	—	—	—
2012–13	Luleå HF	Elitserien	41	2	1	3	38	—	—	—	—	—
2012–13	Brynäs IF	Elitserien	8	0	1	1	4	1	0	0	0	25
2013–14	Brynäs IF	SHL	53	2	2	4	18	5	0	0	0	8
2014–15	Leksands IF	SHL	6	0	0	0	4	—	—	—	—	—
2014–15	VIK Västerås HK	HockeyAllsvenskan	36	4	15	19	22	9	2	2	4	6
2015–16	Leksands IF	HockeyAllsvenskan	46	4	23	27	114	9	1	3	4	2
2016–17	KooKoo	Liiga	57	6	12	18	54	—	—	—	—	—
2017–18	KooKoo	Liiga	10	0	4	4	10	—	—	—	—	—
2018–19	Graz 99ers	EBEL	52	2	11	13	51	10	0	2	2	10
2019–20	AIK IF	HockeyAllsvenskan	52	2	8	10	28	—	—	—	—	—
2020–21	AIK IF	HockeyAllsvenskan	2	0	0	0	0	—	—	—	—	—
2020–21	Tyresö/Hanviken	Hockeyettan	24	0	9	9	51	—	—	—	—	—
SHL (Elitserien) totals			108	4	4	8	64	6	0	0	0	33
Liiga totals			67	6	16	22	64	—	—	—	—	—
EBEL totals			52	2	11	13	51	10	0	2	2	10
HockeyAllsvenskan totals			268	23	68	91	303	18	3	5	8	8
Hockeyettan (Division 1) totals			142	17	37	54	328	20	2	8	10	57
