= Peter Öberg (ice hockey) =

Swedish ice hockey player

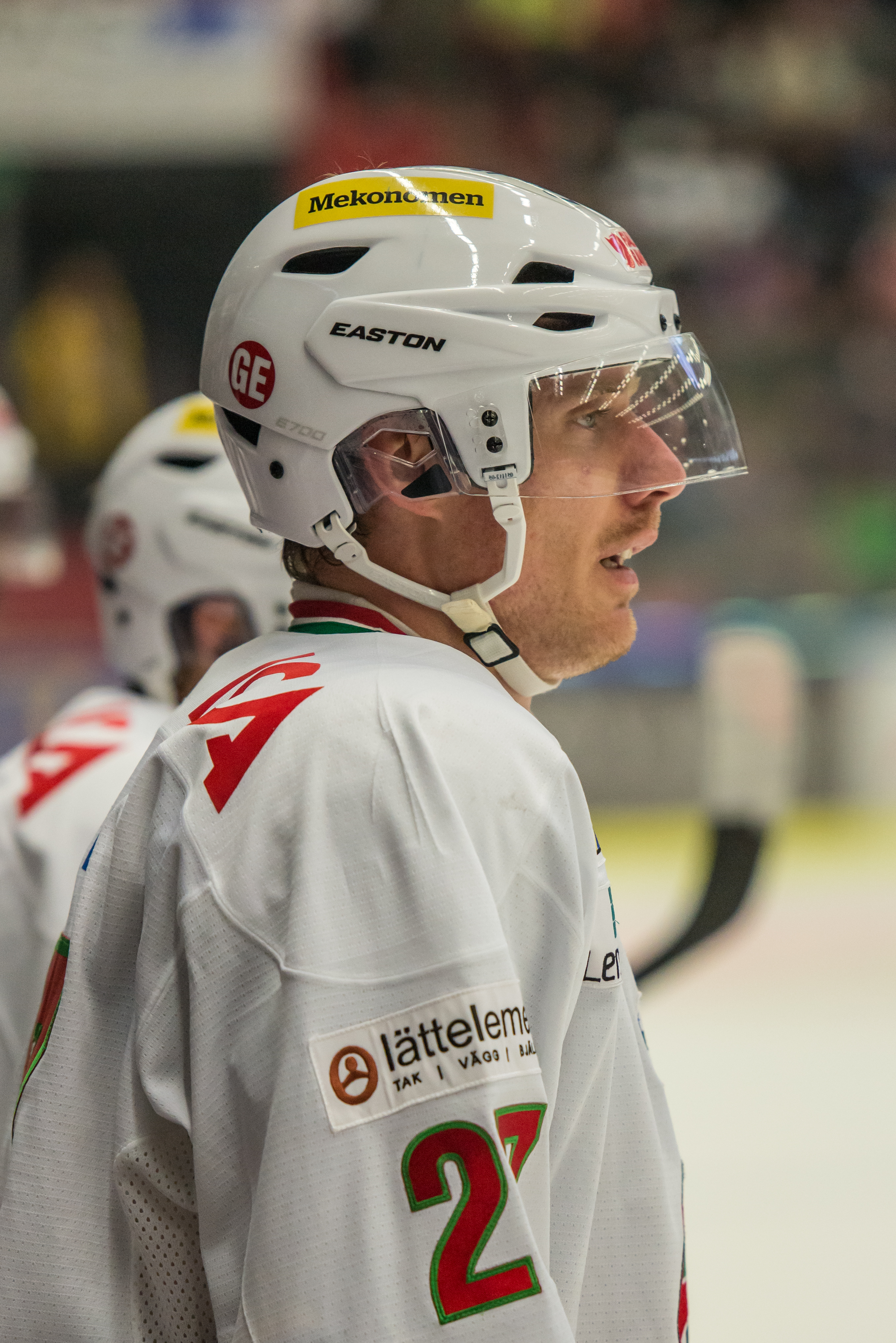
- Born: August 3, 1982 (age 43) Umeå, Sweden
- Height: 6 ft 0 in (183 cm)
- Weight: 198 lb (90 kg; 14 st 2 lb)
- Position: Centre
- Shot: Left
- Played for: Modo Hockey; Örnsköldsvik SK; Gazovik Tyumen; KalPa; VIK Västerås HK; Timrå IK
- NHL draft: Undrafted
- Playing career: 1999–2016

Peter Öberg (born August 3, 1982) is a Swedish ice hockey player. He is currently playing with Modo Hockey in the HockeyAllsvenskan (Allsv).

== Playing career ==
Öberg made his Elitserien debut with Modo Hockey on March 6, 1999. He became a regular at the elite level in 2001, and was with Modo Hockey when they won the Elitserien Champion in 2007.

In 2008, Öberg relocated to Russia where he played with Gazovik Tyumen and Gazovik Univer in the Russian lower leagues before moving to Finland where he played five games with KalPa of the SM-liiga, and finished the season 2008–09 season with VIK Västerås HK of HockeyAllsvenskan. Oberg remained with VIK Västerås HK until March 30, 2012, when he re-signed to return to the Elitserien with Modo Hockey.

== Career statistics ==
			Regular season					Playoffs
Season	Team	League	GP	G	A	Pts	PIM	GP	G	A	Pts	PIM
1998–99	MoDo Hockey J20	J20 SuperElit	2	0	1	1	0	—	—	—	—	—
1998–99	MoDo Hockey	Elitserien	1	0	0	0	0	—	—	—	—	—
1999–00	MoDo Hockey J18	J18 Allsvenskan	2	1	2	3	4	6	0	1	1	2
1999–00	MoDo Hockey J20	J20 SuperElit	26	14	13	27	14	2	0	0	0	12
2000–01	MODO Hockey J20	J20 SuperElit	21	12	15	27	22	3	1	3	4	6
2000–01	MODO Hockey	Elitserien	1	0	0	0	0	—	—	—	—	—
2001–02	MODO Hockey J20	J20 SuperElit	5	1	1	2	0	—	—	—	—	—
2001–02	MODO Hockey	Elitserien	39	1	1	2	68	14	1	2	3	20
2002–03	MODO Hockey J20	J20 SuperElit	1	0	3	3	0	—	—	—	—	—
2002–03	MODO Hockey	Elitserien	23	1	6	7	22	6	0	0	0	4
2002–03	Örnsköldsvik SK	Allsvenskan	8	1	2	3	20	—	—	—	—	—
2003–04	MODO Hockey	Elitserien	46	2	4	6	53	6	0	2	2	4
2004–05	MODO Hockey J20	J20 SuperElit	3	0	1	1	0	—	—	—	—	—
2004–05	MODO Hockey	Elitserien	43	3	4	7	55	6	0	0	0	6
2005–06	MODO Hockey	Elitserien	47	6	6	12	22	3	0	0	0	29
2006–07	MODO Hockey	Elitserien	48	6	12	18	44	20	2	3	5	14
2007–08	MODO Hockey	Elitserien	48	1	7	8	28	5	0	0	0	2
2008–09	Gazovik Tyumen	Russia2	12	3	5	8	6	—	—	—	—	—
2008–09	Gazovik Tyumen-2	Russia3	2	0	1	1	4	—	—	—	—	—
2008–09	KalPa	SM-liiga	5	1	0	1	6	—	—	—	—	—
2008–09	VIK Västerås HK	HockeyAllsvenskan	8	2	8	10	2	10	1	1	2	31
2009–10	VIK Västerås HK	HockeyAllsvenskan	40	6	14	20	70	—	—	—	—	—
2010–11	VIK Västerås HK	HockeyAllsvenskan	34	5	11	16	8	6	1	6	7	2
2011–12	VIK Västerås HK	HockeyAllsvenskan	40	15	18	33	36	6	0	0	0	2
2012–13	MODO Hockey	Elitserien	51	6	8	14	14	5	0	1	1	4
2013–14	MODO Hockey	SHL	45	1	7	8	12	2	0	1	1	0
2014–15	MODO Hockey	SHL	45	1	3	4	18	—	—	—	—	—
2015–16	MODO Hockey	SHL	29	4	3	7	8	—	—	—	—	—
2015–16	Timrå IK	HockeyAllsvenskan	2	0	1	1	2	—	—	—	—	—
SHL (Elitserien) totals			466	32	61	93	344	67	3	9	12	83
SM-liiga totals			5	1	0	1	6	—	—	—	—	—
HockeyAllsvenskan totals			124	28	52	80	118	22	2	7	9	35
Russia2 totals			12	3	5	8	6	—	—	—	—	—
