= 2012 Kvalserien =

Swedish ice hockey tournament

The 2012 Kvalserien was the 38th Kvalserien, which was played between 15 March 2012 and 6 April 2012. It determined which two teams of the participating ones would play in the 2012–13 Elitserien season and which four teams would play in the 2012–13 HockeyAllsvenskan season.

The 12th-seeded Elitserien team Timrå IK defended its spot in the top division, and Rögle BK took over Djurgårdens IF's Elitserien spot. Rögle became the first HockeyAllsvenskan playoff team in history to make one of the two Kvalserien spots for Elitserien.

== Participating teams ==
From Elitserien (ranked 11–12)

- Djurgårdens IF
- Timrå IK

From HockeyAllsvenskan (ranked 1–3)

- Örebro HK
- Leksands IF
- BIK Karlskoga

From HockeyAllsvenskan playoff round

- Rögle BK

== Standings ==
2012 Kvalserien		GP	W	T	L	OTW/SOW	OTL/SOL	GF	GA	DIF	PTS
1	Timrå IK	10	5	4	1	3	1	29	20	+9	22
2	Rögle BK	10	6	1	3	0	1	31	23	+8	19
3	Djurgårdens IF	10	4	2	4	1	1	24	21	+3	15
4	Leksands IF	10	3	2	5	1	1	20	26	–6	12
5	Örebro HK	10	3	1	6	1	0	22	27	–5	11
6	BIK Karlskoga	10	2	4	4	1	3	18	27	–9	11

Legend: Qualified for the 2012–13 Elitserien season; Play in the 2012–13 HockeyAllsvenskan season

== Game log ==
2012 Kvalserien game log
March

Round	Date	Home	Result	Away	Venue	Attendance
1	March 15	Djurgårdens IF	3–4	Rögle BK	Hovet	6,244
1	March 15	Timrå IK	5–4 OT	BIK Karlskoga	E.ON Arena	4,849
1	March 15	Örebro HK	2–3	Leksands IF	Behrn Arena	4,777
2	March 17	Rögle BK	5–1	Örebro HK	Lindab Arena	3,769
2	March 17	BIK Karlskoga	2–3 SO	Djurgårdens IF	Nobelhallen	5,457
2	March 17	Leksands IF	2–3 OT	Timrå IK	Tegera Arena	7,650
3	March 19	Djurgårdens IF	3–1	Leksands IF	Hovet	8,094
3	March 20	Timrå IK	2–1	Örebro HK	E.ON Arena	4,882
3	March 20	BIK Karlskoga	3–1	Rögle BK	Nobelhallen	2,652
4	March 22	Örebro HK	3–2 SO	Djurgårdens IF	Behrn Arena	4,553
4	March 22	Leksands IF	1–0 OT	BIK Karlskoga	Tegera Arena	6,703
4	March 22	Rögle BK	0–3	Timrå IK	Lindab Arena	4,222
5	March 24	BIK Karlskoga	3–2	Örebro HK	Nobelhallen	4,469
5	March 24	Djurgårdens IF	2–3	Timrå IK	Hovet	7,651
5	March 24	Leksands IF	2–5	Rögle BK	Tegera Arena	7,562
6	March 27	Timrå IK	3–2	Djurgårdens IF	E.ON Arena	5,826
6	March 27	Örebro HK	3–0	BIK Karlskoga	Behrn Arena	3,052
6	March 27	Rögle BK	5–3	Leksands IF	Lindab Arena	4,947
7	March 29	Djurgårdens IF	4–2	Örebro HK	Hovet	6,032
7	March 29	Timrå IK	2–1 OT	Rögle BK	E.ON Arena	5,096
7	March 29	BIK Karlskoga	1–3	Leksands IF	Nobelhallen	3,347
8	March 31	Örebro HK	4–3	Timrå IK	Behrn Arena	2,462
8	March 31	Leksands IF	2–0	Djurgårdens IF	Tegera Arena	7,650
8	March 31	Rögle BK	5–3	BIK Karlskoga	Lindab Arena	4,483

April

Round	Date	Home	Result	Away	Venue	Attendance
9	April 3	Djurgårdens IF	3–0	BIK Karlskoga	Hovet	3,150
9	April 3	Timrå IK	4–2	Leksands IF	E.ON Arena	6,000
9	April 3	Örebro HK	1–4	Rögle BK	Behrn Arena	2,063
10	April 6	Leksands IF	1–3	Örebro HK	Tegera Arena	5,447
10	April 6	BIK Karlskoga	2–1 SO	Timrå IK	Nobelhallen	1,846
10	April 6	Rögle BK	1–2	Djurgårdens IF	Lindab Arena	5,048

== Statistics ==
=== Scoring leaders ===
Updated as of the end of the season.
GP = Games played; G = Goals; A = Assists; Pts = Points; +/– = Plus/minus; PIM = Penalty minutes

Player	Team	GP	G	A	Pts	+/–	PIM
(United States) Matt Murley	Timrå IK	9	4	7	11	+4	2
(Sweden) Johan Wiklander	Örebro HK	9	9	0	9	+3	6
(Sweden) Daniel Sondell	Rögle BK	10	3	6	9	+7	0
(Canada) Mat Robinson	Timrå IK	9	3	5	8	+5	4
(Sweden) Christopher Liljewall	Rögle BK	10	2	6	8	+3	2
(Sweden) Pär Edblom	Örebro HK	10	1	7	8	0	6
(Sweden) Fredrik Bremberg	Timrå IK	9	0	8	8	0	0
(Sweden) Jens Bergenström	Leksands IF	10	6	1	7	+3	0
(Sweden) Simon Olsson	Rögle BK	10	3	4	7	+4	4

=== Leading goaltenders ===
These are the leaders in GAA among goaltenders who played at least 40% of the team's minutes. Updated as of the end of the season.

GP = Games played; TOI = Time on ice (minutes); GA = Goals against; SO = Shutouts; Sv% = Save percentage; GAA = Goals against average

Player	Team	GP	TOI	GA	SO	Sv%	GAA
(Sweden) Joakim Lundström	Timrå IK	9	544:20	18	1	.931	1.98
(Sweden) Gustaf Wesslau	Djurgårdens IF	10	603:43	21	1	.921	2.09
(Sweden) Jonas Fransson	Rögle BK	10	599:03	22	0	.935	2.20
(Sweden) Erik Hanses	Leksands IF	10	599:45	24	2	.924	2.40
(Sweden) Nicklas Dahlberg	Örebro HK	7	422:25	17	1	.924	2.41
(Italy) Daniel Bellissimo	BIK Karlskoga	9	543:12	24	0	.906	2.65
