= Nils Andersson (ice hockey) =

Swedish ice hockey player

- Born: October 15, 1991 (age 34) Umeå, Sweden
- Height: 6 ft 2 in (188 cm)
- Weight: 183 lb (83 kg; 13 st 1 lb)
- Position: Defence
- Shot: Right
- Played for: Växjö Lakers; Malmö Redhawks; HV71
- Playing career: 2009–2020

Nils Andersson (born October 15, 1991) is a Swedish former professional ice hockey defenceman. He last played with HV71 in the Swedish Hockey League (SHL).

Playing originally with the Växjö Lakers, Andersson made his Elitserien debut on September 13, 2011.

== Career statistics ==
			Regular season					Playoffs
Season	Team	League	GP	G	A	Pts	PIM	GP	G	A	Pts	PIM
2006–07	IF Björklöven U16	U16 SM	3	0	1	1	2	—	—	—	—	—
2006–07	IF Björklöven J18	J18 Allsvenskan	13	0	3	3	6	—	—	—	—	—
2007–08	IF Björklöven J18	J18 Elit	18	3	10	13	4	—	—	—	—	—
2007–08	IF Björklöven J18	J18 Allsvenskan	14	1	9	10	16	—	—	—	—	—
2008–09	IF Björklöven J18	J18 Elit	11	1	11	12	10	2	0	3	3	6
2008–09	IF Björklöven J20	J20 SuperElit	30	3	12	15	46	—	—	—	—	—
2008–09	IF Björklöven	HockeyAllsvenskan	4	0	0	0	0	—	—	—	—	—
2009–10	IF Björklöven J20	J20 SuperElit	3	1	0	1	4	—	—	—	—	—
2009–10	IF Björklöven	HockeyAllsvenskan	32	2	5	7	30	—	—	—	—	—
2010–11	Växjö Lakers HC J20	J20 Elit	3	1	6	7	2	—	—	—	—	—
2010–11	Växjö Lakers HC	HockeyAllsvenskan	38	3	7	10	22	8	1	3	4	0
2011–12	Växjö Lakers HC J20	J20 SuperElit	8	9	7	16	4	—	—	—	—	—
2011–12	Växjö Lakers HC	Elitserien	45	1	7	8	10	—	—	—	—	—
2012–13	Djurgårdens IF	HockeyAllsvenskan	—	—	—	—	—	—	—	—	—	—
2013–14	Djurgårdens IF	HockeyAllsvenskan	38	8	21	29	24	9	0	1	1	0
2014–15	Malmö Redhawks	HockeyAllsvenskan	52	13	18	31	14	11	5	3	8	8
2015–16	Malmö Redhawks	SHL	49	6	24	30	37	—	—	—	—	—
2016–17	Malmö Redhawks	SHL	46	7	16	23	18	13	1	2	3	10
2017–18	Malmö Redhawks	SHL	47	8	20	28	20	10	2	3	5	12
2018–19	HV71	SHL	43	5	12	17	18	9	0	3	3	0
2019–20	HV71	SHL	27	4	10	14	20	—	—	—	—	—
SHL (Elitserien) totals			257	31	89	120	123	32	3	8	11	22
HockeyAllsvenskan totals			164	26	51	77	90	28	6	7	13	8
