= Robin Jacobsson =

Robin Jacobsson may refer to:

- Robin Jacobsson (footballer) (born 1990), Swedish footballer
- Robin Jacobsson (ice hockey) (born 1986), Swedish ice hockey player
