= Peter LeBlanc (ice hockey) =

Canadian ice hockey player

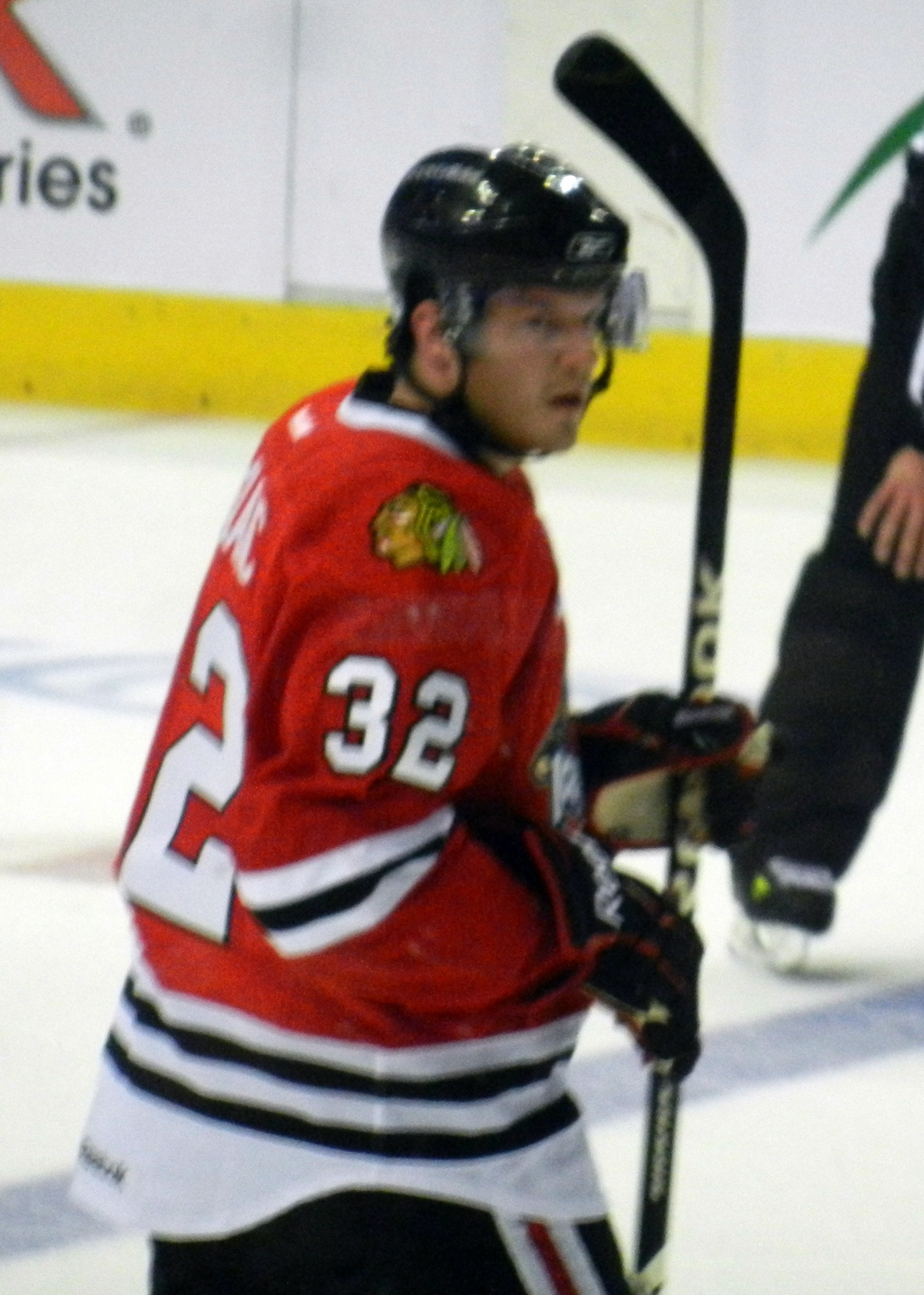
- Born: February 3, 1988 (age 38) Hamilton, Ontario, Canada
- Height: 5 ft 11 in (180 cm)
- Weight: 207 lb (94 kg; 14 st 11 lb)
- Position: Centre
- Shot: Left
- Oberliga team Former teams: Essen Mosquitoes; Washington Capitals; Rögle BK; HPK; Fife Flyers; EK Zell am See
- NHL draft: 186th overall, 2006; Chicago Blackhawks
- Playing career: 2010–2020

Peter LeBlanc (born February 3, 1988) is a Canadian professional ice hockey forward who last played for the Essen Mosquitoes of the German Oberliga. He played a solitary game in the National Hockey League (NHL) with the Washington Capitals.

== Playing career ==
As a youth, Leblanc played in the 2002 Quebec International Pee-Wee Hockey Tournament with a minor ice hockey team from Hamilton, Ontario.

Selected by the Chicago Blackhawks 186th overall in the 2006 NHL entry draft, Leblanc was assigned to AHL affiliate, the Rockford IceHogs. During the 2012–13 season, LeBlanc was traded by the Blackhawks to the Washington Capitals for future considerations in AHL contracted player Matt Beaudoin on January 31, 2013.

In July 2013, LeBlanc was re-signed by the Capitals to a one-year, two-way contract. He was reassigned to AHL affiliate, the Hershey Bears, for the duration of the 2013–14 season, scoring 12 goals and 28 points in 65 games. LeBlanc was recalled by the Capitals and made his NHL debut in their final regular season game in a 1–0 shootout defeat by the Tampa Bay Lightning on April 13, 2014.

As a pending free agent, LeBlanc opted to sign his first European contract on a one-year deal with Swedish club, Rögle BK of the HockeyAllsvenskan on June 12, 2014. In the 2014–15 season, LeBlanc was unable to contribute to his expectations with 18 points in 50 contests. LeBlanc opted to remain in Europe the following season, signing with top flight Finnish outfit, HPK of the Liiga.

Following a single season with HPK as a depth forward in 2015–16, LeBlanc returned to North America, signing a one-year deal with the Cincinnati Cyclones of the ECHL on September 14, 2016.

After a short spell with the Manchester Monarchs, LeBlanc agreed to a move to the Fife Flyers of the United Kingdom's Elite Ice Hockey League on June 30, 2017.

== Career statistics ==
			Regular season					Playoffs
Season	Team	League	GP	G	A	Pts	PIM	GP	G	A	Pts	PIM
2003–04	Hamilton Red Wings	OPJHL	1	0	0	0	0	—	—	—	—	—
2004–05	Hamilton Red Wings	OPJHL	49	14	22	36	23	—	—	—	—	—
2005–06	Hamilton Red Wings	OPJHL	21	10	12	22	25	—	—	—	—	—
2006–07	New Hampshire Wildcats	HE	39	1	4	5	4	—	—	—	—	—
2007–08	New Hampshire Wildcats	HE	37	5	10	15	37	—	—	—	—	—
2008–09	New Hampshire Wildcats	HE	38	14	16	30	8	—	—	—	—	—
2009–10	New Hampshire Wildcats	HE	39	14	21	35	24	—	—	—	—	—
2010–11	Rockford IceHogs	AHL	57	12	18	30	12	—	—	—	—	—
2010–11	Toledo Walleye	ECHL	22	8	14	22	6	—	—	—	—	—
2011–12	Rockford IceHogs	AHL	72	24	20	44	14	—	—	—	—	—
2012–13	Rockford IceHogs	AHL	34	4	8	12	15	—	—	—	—	—
2012–13	Hershey Bears	AHL	33	8	10	18	4	5	0	8	8	0
2013–14	Hershey Bears	AHL	65	12	16	28	16	—	—	—	—	—
2013–14	Washington Capitals	NHL	1	0	0	0	0	—	—	—	—	—
2014–15	Rögle BK	Allsv	50	6	12	18	16	9	4	1	5	2
2015–16	HPK	Liiga	46	2	8	10	4	—	—	—	—	—
2016–17	Cincinnati Cyclones	ECHL	42	10	20	30	11	—	—	—	—	—
2016–17	Manchester Monarchs	ECHL	11	3	4	7	0	—	—	—	—	—
2017–18	Fife Flyers	EIHL	56	20	37	57	14	4	0	0	0	0
2018–19	EK Zell am See	AlpsHL	40	20	19	39	18	—	—	—	—	—
2019–20	Essen Mosquitoes	GER.3	35	8	21	29	8	—	—	—	—	—
AHL totals			261	60	72	132	61	5	0	8	8	0
NHL totals			1	0	0	0	0	—	—	—	—	—

== Awards and honours ==
Award	Year
OPJHL
Rookie of the Year	2005
College
All-Northeast Regional Team	2009
