= Peter Öberg =

Peter Öberg (Swedish) or Oberg (German) may refer to:

- Peter Öberg (ice hockey) (born 1982), Swedish professional ice hockey player
- Peter Öberg (orienteer) (born 1980), Swedish orienteering competitor
