= Daniel Sylvander =

Swedish ice hockey player

Daniel Sylwander
- Born: September 23, 1992 (age 33) Ängelholm, Sweden
- Height: 6 ft 3 in (191 cm)
- Weight: 209 lb (95 kg; 14 st 13 lb)
- Position: Centre
- Shoots: Left
- Allsv team Former teams: Tingsryds AIF; Rögle BK
- Playing career: 2011–present

Daniel Sylwander (born September 23, 1992) is a Swedish professional ice hockey player. He is currently playing with Tingsryds AIF of the Swedish HockeyAllsvenskan (Allsv).

Daniel Sylwander made his SHL debut playing with Rögle BK during the 2012–13 Elitserien season.
