= Pär Edblom =

Swedish ice hockey player

- Born: January 31, 1985 (age 40); Örnsköldsvik, Sweden
- Height: 6 ft 3 in (191 cm)
- Weight: 190 lb (86 kg; 13 st 8 lb)
- Position: Forward
- Shot: Left
- NHL draft: Undrafted
- Playing career: 2007–2017

Pär Edblom (born January 31, 1985) is a Swedish former ice hockey player.

Edblom made his Swedish Hockey League debut playing with Leksands IF during the 2013–14 SHL season. In September 2016, Edblom got a stick in the eye during a HockeyAllsvenskan game against AIK, which forced him into seven surgeries and subsequently to finish his career.
