= Lars Volden =

Norwegian ice hockey player

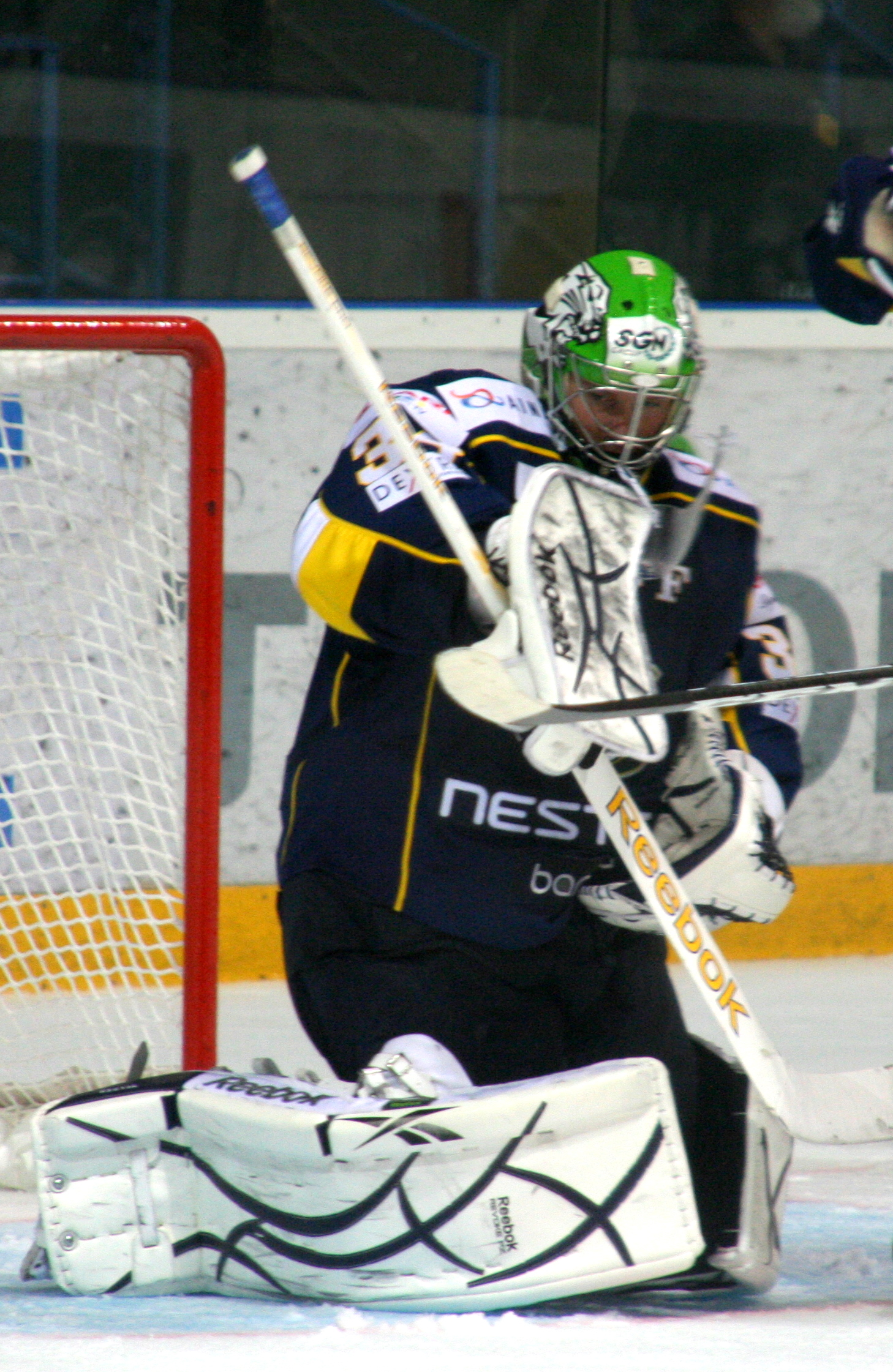
- Born: July 26, 1992 (age 33) Oslo, Norway
- Height: 6 ft 3 in (191 cm)
- Weight: 209 lb (95 kg; 14 st 13 lb)
- Position: Goaltender
- Catches: Left
- Allsv team Former teams: BIK Karlskoga; Stavanger Oilers; Espoo Blues; Rögle BK; HK Dukla Trenčín; HC Dukla Jihlava; Malmö Redhawks
- National team: Norway
- NHL draft: 181st overall, 2011; Boston Bruins
- Playing career: 2009–present

Lars Volden (born July 26, 1992) is a Norwegian professional ice hockey goaltender who currently plays for the BIK Karlskoga of the HockeyAllsvenskan (Allsv). He was drafted 181st overall by the Boston Bruins in the 2011 NHL entry draft. He has also played for the Norwegian national team in several World Championships, and at the 2014 Winter Olympics.

== Playing career ==
Volden joined the Swedish second-tier club, Rögle BK, from Espoo Blues of the Finnish Liiga on a one-year deal on April 29, 2014.

Volden returned from a two seasons in the Czech Extraliga, to continue his European in Sweden, agreeing to a contract with IK Pantern of the HockeyAllsvenskan for the 2018–19 season. As Pantern's starting goaltender he made 44 appearances in posting a .920 save percentage. He was loaned at the tail end of the season to the Malmö Redhawks appearing in 3 regular season games.

On 29 April 2019, Volden's loan move to the Redhawks was made permanent in securing a two-year contract through to 2021.

== International play ==
On January 7, 2014, Volden was named to Norway's national ice hockey team that competed in the 2014 Winter Olympics in Sochi.

== Awards and honours ==
- Named Best Goaltender at the 2010 World U18 Championship Division IA
