= Göran Sjöberg =

Swedish ice hockey player and coach

- Born: June 8, 1960 (age 64); SWE
- Height: 6 ft 4 in (193 cm)
- Weight: 205 lb (93 kg; 14 st 9 lb)
- Position: Forward
- Played for: Brynäs IF; VIK Västerås HK
- Playing career: 1982–1992

Göran "Flygis" Sjöberg (born June 8, 1960) is a retired Swedish ice hockey player and coach. From 2005 to 2007, he was assistant coach in the Swedish Elitserien club HV71.

== Playing career ==
Sjöberg has played for Brynäs IF (two seasons) and VIK Västerås HK (five seasons) in Sweden's top elite ice hockey league Elitserien. He retired from his active playing career after the season 1991–92 in which he played for Team Gävle in Swedish Division 1, tier three in the Swedish league structure.

== Coaching career ==
He coached the Storhamar Dragons of Hamar, Norway from 1994 to 1995, where he led the team to its first Norwegian championship.

From 2005 to 2007, Sjöberg was assistant coach to Pär Mårts in HV71. Before coming to HV71 Sjöberg has coached Brynäs IF and AIK (together with Mårts). Before that he coached Brynäs IF's youth club Hille/Åbyggeby in Division 1.
