= Stefan Gråhns =

Swedish ice hockey player

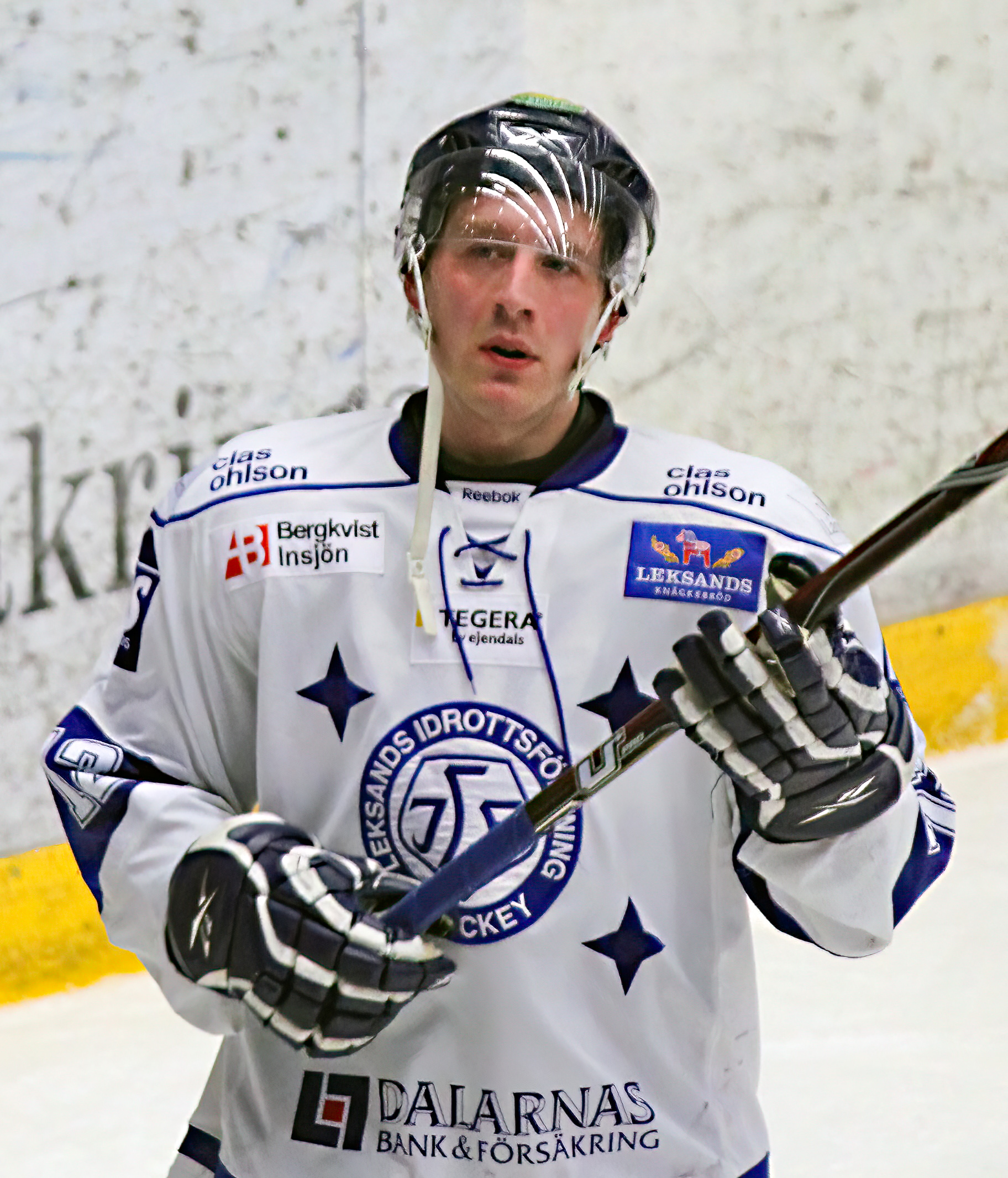
- A portrait of Stefan Gråhns
- Born: April 19, 1982 (age 42); Södertälje, Sweden
- Height: 5 ft 11 in (180 cm)
- Weight: 185 lb (84 kg; 13 st 3 lb)
- Position: Forward
- Shoots: Left
- SHL team: Växjö Lakers
- NHL draft: Undrafted
- Playing career: 2002–present

Stefan Gråhns (born April 19, 1982) is a Swedish ice hockey player. He is currently playing with Växjö Lakers of the Swedish Hockey League (SHL).

Grahns made his Elitserien debut playing with Södertälje SK during the 2001–02 Elitserien season.
