= Robin Jacobsson (footballer) =

Swedish footballer

Personal information
- Full name: Robin Jacobsson
- Date of birth: 28 March 1990 (age 36)
- Place of birth: Sweden
- Height: 1.81 m (5 ft 11 in)
- Position: Defender

Team information
- Current team: Assyriska FF
- Number: 25

Youth career
- Öja FF

Senior career*
Years	Team	Apps	(Gls)
2010–2011	Trelleborgs FF	4	(0)
2012–2014	BW 90 IF	57	(12)
2014–2017	Trelleborgs FF	84	(1)
2018–	Assyriska FF	0	(0)
- * Club domestic league appearances and goals as of 30 March 2018

Robin Jacobsson (born 28 March 1990) is a Swedish footballer who plays for Assyriska FF as a defender.
