= Henrik Lundberg (ice hockey goaltender) =

Swedish ice hockey player

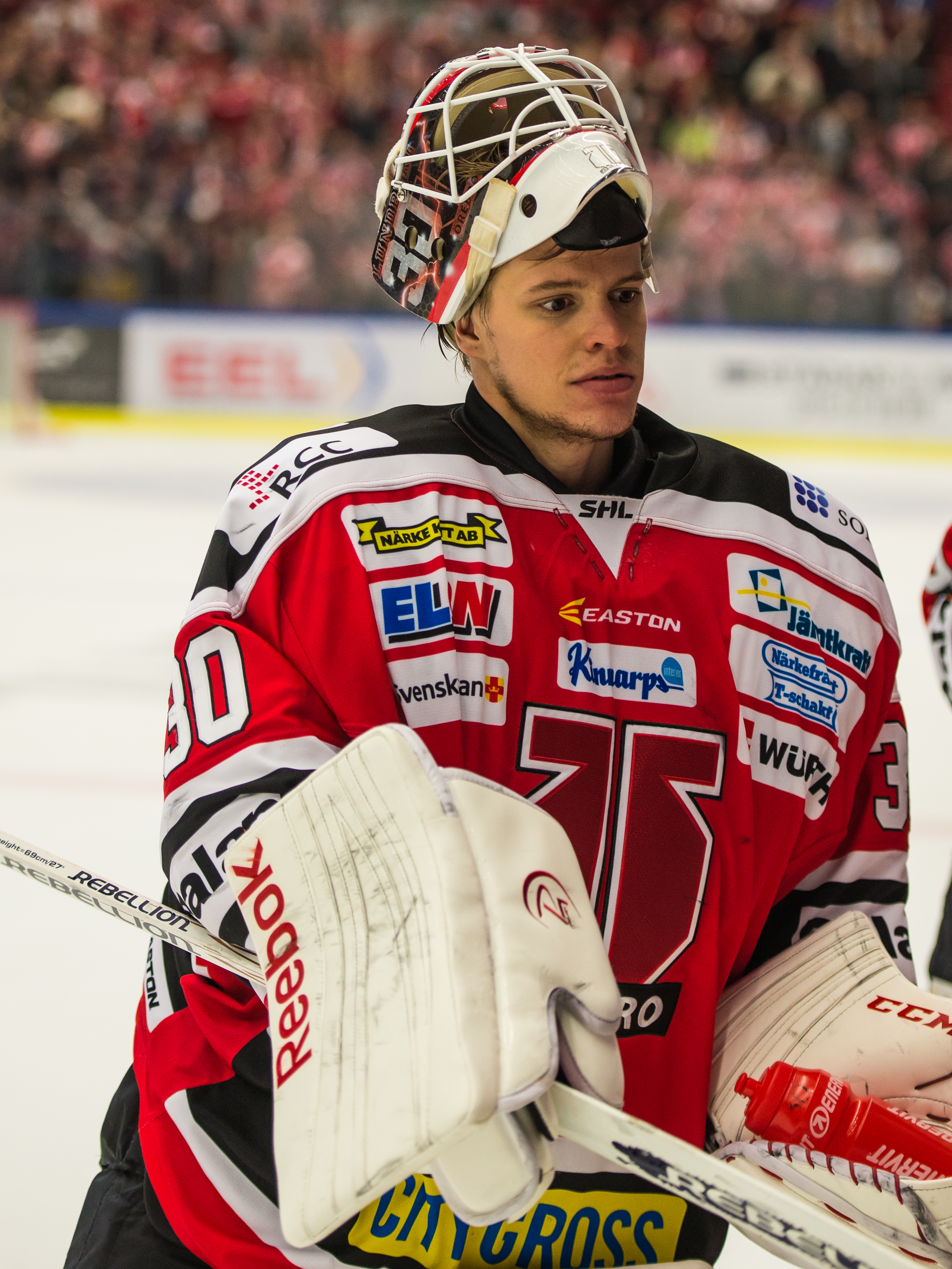
- Born: 14 January 1991 (age 34); Gothenburg, Sweden
- Height: 6 ft 0 in (183 cm)
- Weight: 183 lb (83 kg; 13 st 1 lb)
- Position: Goaltender
- Catches: Left
- SHL team: Örebro HK
- NHL draft: Undrafted
- Playing career: 2011–present

Henrik Lundberg (born 14 January 1991) is a Swedish ice hockey goaltender. He is currently playing with Örebro HK of the Swedish Hockey League (SHL).

Lundberg made his Swedish Hockey League debut playing with Örebro HK during the 2013–14 SHL season.
