= Erik Andersson (ice hockey, born 1994) =

Swedish ice hockey player

- Born: 4 July 1994 (age 31) Nittorp, Sweden
- Height: 6 ft 0 in (183 cm)
- Weight: 203 lb (92 kg; 14 st 7 lb)
- Position: Left wing
- Shoots: Left
- SHL team Former teams: Timrå IK; HV71; Rögle BK
- Playing career: 2013–present

Erik Andersson (born 4 July 1994) is a Swedish professional ice hockey player. He is currently playing with Timrå IK of the Swedish Hockey League (SHL).

Andersson made his Swedish Hockey League debut playing with HV71 during the 2013–14 SHL season.

== Awards and honors ==
Award	Year
SHL
Le Mat trophy (HV71)	2017
