= Tomi Sallinen =

Finnish ice hockey player

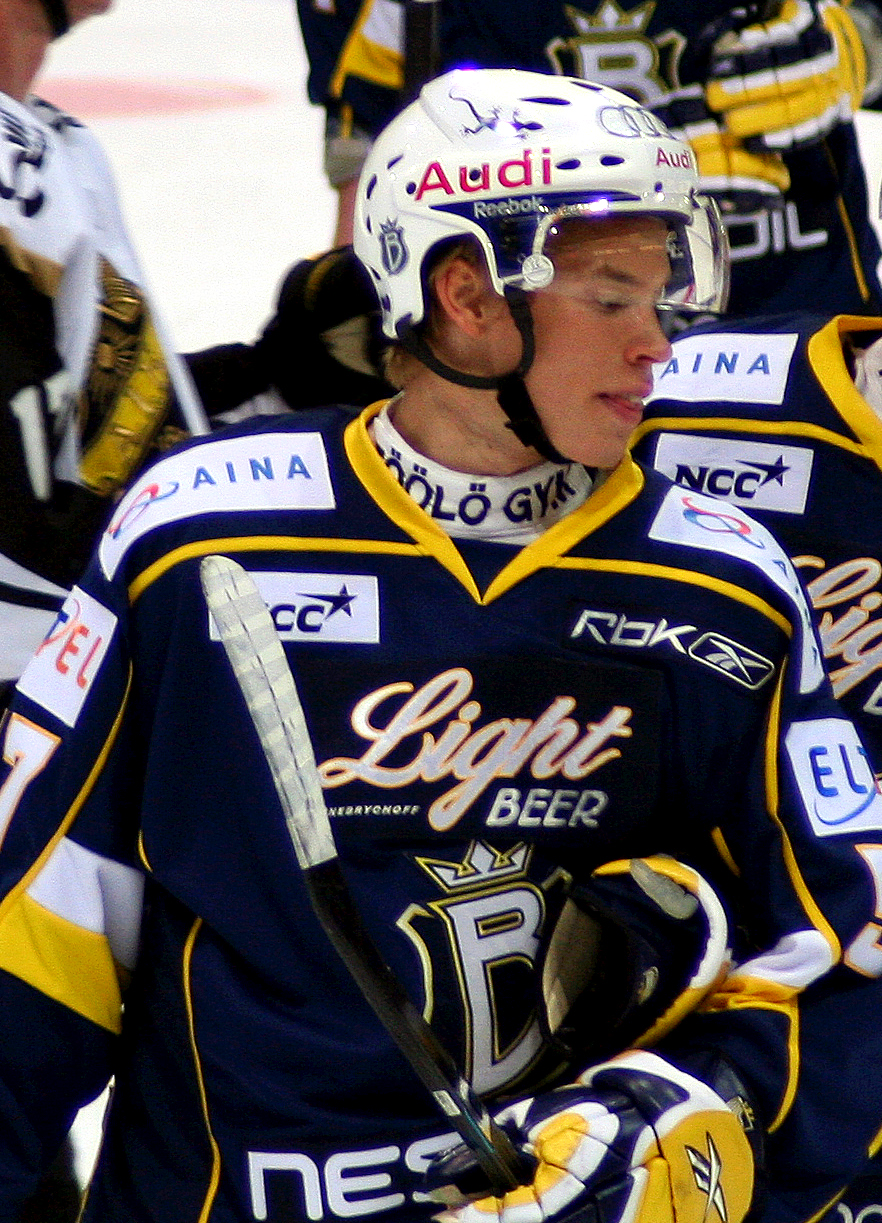
- Born: 11 February 1989 (age 36); Espoo, Finland
- Height: 6 ft 0 in (183 cm)
- Weight: 176 lb (80 kg; 12 st 8 lb)
- Position: Centre
- Shoots: Left
- Liiga team Former teams: Kiekko-Espoo; Luleå HF; Espoo Blues; Leksands IF; Djurgårdens IF; Neftekhimik Nizhnekamsk; Kunlun Red Star; EHC Kloten; Färjestad BK; Brynäs IF; HC Kometa Brno
- National team: Finland
- Playing career: 2007–present

Tomi Sallinen (born 11 February 1989) is a Finnish professional ice hockey center who currently plays for Kiekko-Espoo in Liiga (Liiga). Sallinen previously played in the SHL for Luleå HF and Djurgårdens IF.

== Playing career ==
Sallinen started his Liiga career with his hometown club, Espoo Blues. In 2008 and 2011, he made the Liiga finals with the Blues, but did not capture the title. On 11 April 2014, Sallinen left the Blues to sign a one-year contract in Sweden with Leksands IF of the Swedish Hockey League (SHL). Leksand was relegated in the 2014–15 SHL season, and Sallinen signed with SHL rivals Djurgårdens IF in April 2015.

He left Sweden after the 2015-16 campaign to further his career in the Kontinental Hockey League (KHL), landing a deal with HC Neftekhimik Nizhnekamsk. In November 2016, he transferred to fellow KHL side HC Kunlun Red Star.

On 14 September 2017, Sallinen was signed to a one-month contract by EHC Kloten, valid through October 15. He was signed as an injury replacement for fellow countryman, Tommi Santala.

As a free agent before the 2018–19 season, Sallinen returned for a second stint in Sweden, initially agreeing to a contract with Färjestad BK of the SHL on 22 May 2018. Unable to fully integrate into Farjestad's squad, Sallinen posted 4 points in 9 games before he was released from his contract on 18 December 2018. He remained in the SHL, transferring as a free agent to join Brynäs IF on 28 December 2018.

== International play ==
Medal record

Representing Finland

Ice hockey

World Championships
| Silver medal – second place | 2016 Russia | |
| Silver medal – second place | 2014 Belarus | |

Sallinen won silver representing Finland at the 2014 and 2016 World Championships.

== Career statistics ==
=== Regular season and playoffs ===
| | | | Regular season | | | | | Playoffs |
| Season | Team | League | GP | G | A | Pts | PIM | GP | G | A | Pts | PIM |
|---|---|---|---|---|---|---|---|---|---|---|---|---|
| 2007–08 | Espoo Blues | Liiga | 29 | 3 | 2 | 5 | 2 | 17 | 1 | 3 | 4 | 2 |
| 2007–08 | Suomi U20 | Mestis | 5 | 1 | 3 | 4 | 0 | — | — | — | — | — |
| 2008–09 | Espoo Blues | Liiga | 51 | 4 | 9 | 13 | 18 | 11 | 0 | 2 | 2 | 0 |
| 2008–09 | Suomi U20 | Mestis | 1 | 1 | 1 | 2 | 0 | — | — | — | — | — |
| 2009–10 | Espoo Blues | Liiga | 57 | 7 | 13 | 20 | 8 | 3 | 1 | 1 | 2 | 0 |
| 2010–11 | Espoo Blues | Liiga | 41 | 5 | 5 | 10 | 4 | 18 | 2 | 3 | 5 | 16 |
| 2011–12 | Espoo Blues | Liiga | 47 | 5 | 10 | 15 | 8 | 10 | 0 | 3 | 3 | 0 |
| 2012–13 | Espoo Blues | Liiga | 58 | 12 | 23 | 35 | 55 | — | — | — | — | — |
| 2013–14 | Espoo Blues | Liiga | 58 | 14 | 13 | 27 | 37 | 7 | 3 | 8 | 11 | 0 |
| 2014–15 | Leksands IF | SHL | 54 | 19 | 17 | 36 | 4 | 7 | 5 | 1 | 6 | 2 |
| 2015–16 | Djurgårdens IF | SHL | 46 | 8 | 24 | 32 | 30 | 7 | 0 | 1 | 1 | 0 |
| 2016–17 | Neftekhimik Nizhnekamsk | KHL | 19 | 2 | 1 | 3 | 8 | — | — | — | — | — |
| 2016–17 | Kunlun Red Star | KHL | 30 | 6 | 4 | 10 | 10 | 2 | 0 | 0 | 0 | 0 |
| 2017–18 | EHC Kloten | NL | 46 | 8 | 14 | 22 | 18 | — | — | — | — | — |
| 2018–19 | Färjestad BK | SHL | 9 | 1 | 3 | 4 | 0 | — | — | — | — | — |
| 2018–19 | Brynäs IF | SHL | 24 | 3 | 8 | 11 | 4 | — | — | — | — | — |
| 2019–20 | Brynäs IF | SHL | 52 | 11 | 16 | 27 | 12 | — | — | — | — | — |
| 2020–21 | Brynäs IF | SHL | 41 | 5 | 12 | 17 | 12 | — | — | — | — | — |
| 2021–22 | Brynäs IF | SHL | 48 | 8 | 10 | 18 | 12 | 3 | 1 | 0 | 1 | 0 |
| 2022–23 | HC Kometa Brno | ELH | 16 | 0 | 7 | 7 | 4 | — | — | — | — | — |
| Liiga totals | | | 341 | 50 | 75 | 125 | 132 | 66 | 7 | 20 | 27 | 18 |
| SHL totals | | | 274 | 55 | 90 | 145 | 74 | 17 | 6 | 2 | 8 | 2 |

=== International ===
| Year | Team | Event | Result | GP | G | A | Pts | PIM |
|---|---|---|---|---|---|---|---|---|
| 2007 | Finland | WJC18 | 7th | 6 | 2 | 0 | 2 | 0 |
| 2008 | Finland | WJC | 6th | 6 | 0 | 1 | 1 | 0 |
| 2009 | Finland | WJC | 7th | 6 | 2 | 3 | 5 | 0 |
| 2014 | Finland | WC | 2nd place, silver medalist(s) | 7 | 0 | 0 | 0 | 2 |
| 2016 | Finland | WC | 2nd place, silver medalist(s) | 10 | 0 | 2 | 2 | 0 |
| 2017 | Finland | WC | 4th | 4 | 1 | 1 | 2 | 2 |
| Junior totals | | | | 18 | 4 | 4 | 8 | 0 |
| Senior totals | | | | 21 | 1 | 3 | 4 | 4 |
