= Jonas Fransson =

Swedish ice hockey player

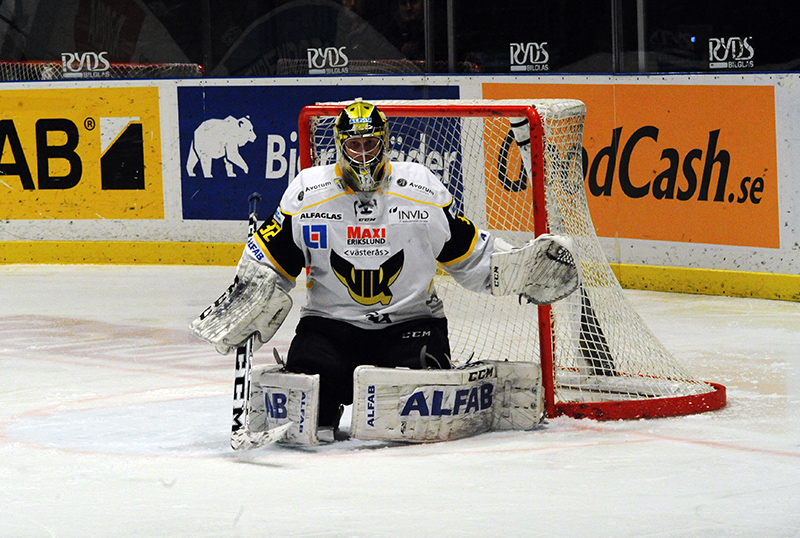
- Born: February 20, 1980 (age 45) Tranås, SWE
- Height: 6 ft 0 in (183 cm)
- Weight: 194 lb (88 kg; 13 st 12 lb)
- Position: Goaltender
- Catches: Left
- Allsvenskan team Former teams: Rögle BK; Tranås HF; HV 71; Leksands IF; IFK Arboga; Linköpings HC; Stavanger Oilers; EfB Ishockey
- NHL draft: Undrafted
- Playing career: 1997–present

Jonas Fransson (born February 20, 1980) is a Swedish professional ice hockey goaltender. He currently plays for Rögle BK in the Swedish HockeyAllsvenskan.

He was the backup goaltender with Linköpings HC, behind former IIHF goalie Daniel Henriksson.

== Clubs ==
- Tranås AIF (1997–2000)
- HV 71 (2000–2001)
- Leksands IF (2001
- HV 71 (2001–2002
- Leksands IF (2002)
- IFK Arboga (2002–2003)
- Rögle BK (2003–2005)
- Linköpings HC (2005–2006)
- Tranås AIF (2006–2007)
- Linköping HC (2007–2009)
- Stavanger Oilers (2009)
- EfB Ishockey (2009–2010)
- Rögle BK (2010–present)
