= Christopher Liljewall =

Swedish ice hockey player (born 1989)

- Born: December 27, 1989 (age 35); Ängelholm, Sweden
- Height: 6 ft 2 in (188 cm)
- Weight: 203 lb (92 kg; 14 st 7 lb)
- Position: Forward
- Shoots: Left
- SHL team Former teams: Free Agent; Rögle BK; Brynäs IF; Timrå IK
- Playing career: 2008–present

Christopher Liljewall (born December 27, 1989) is a Swedish professional ice hockey player. He is currently an unrestricted free agent who most recently played with Timrå IK of the Swedish Hockey League (SHL).

== Playing career ==
Liljewall made his Elitserien (now the SHL) debut playing with Rögle BK during the 2008–09 Elitserien season.

Liljewall captained Rögle BK for two seasons before leaving the club at the conclusion of the 2016–17 season, to join finalists Brynäs IF on a two-year contract on May 17, 2017.
