= 2009–10 HockeyAllsvenskan season =

- League: HockeyAllsvenskan
- Sport: Ice hockey
- Duration: 52 game regular season
- Number of teams: 14
- Total attendance: 859,740 (regular season)
- Average attendance: 2,362 (regular season)
- First place: Leksands IF
- Promoted to HockeyAllsvenskan: AIK IF
- Relegated to Division 1: IF Björklöven*; *Denied elite license for the following season

HockeyAllsvenskan seasons
- ← 2008–09 2010–11 →

The 2009–10 HockeyAllsvenskan season was the fifth season of HockeyAllsvenskan, the second level of ice hockey in Sweden. 14 teams participated in the league, and the top four qualified for the Kvalserien, with the opportunity to be promoted to the Elitserien.

== Participating teams ==
2009–10 HockeyAllsvenskan teams

== Regular season ==
Pos	Team	Pld	W	OTW	OTL	L	GF	GA	GD	Pts	Qualification
1	Leksands IF	52	31	4	6	11	185	133	+52	107	Advance to Elitserien qualifiers
2	AIK	52	31	3	5	13	174	123	+51	104	Advance to Elitserien qualifiers
3	Växjö Lakers	52	29	4	7	12	177	140	+37	102	Advance to Elitserien qualifiers
4	Almtuna IS	52	29	3	2	18	136	108	+28	95	Advance to pre-qualifiers
5	Malmö Redhawks	52	25	6	5	16	165	146	+19	92	Advance to pre-qualifiers
6	Bofors IK	52	20	7	11	14	160	155	+5	85	Advance to pre-qualifiers
7	Mora IK	52	24	3	6	19	170	151	+19	84	Advance to pre-qualifiers
8	VIK Västerås HK	52	21	3	5	23	138	138	0	74	
9	Borås HC	52	18	8	4	22	146	156	−10	74	
10	Örebro HK	52	13	8	8	23	171	193	−22	63	
11	IF Troja/Ljungby	52	14	9	3	26	138	167	−29	63	
12	IF Björklöven (R)	52	15	4	5	28	114	145	−31	58	Denied an "elite license" for financial reasons, relegated
13	IF Sundsvall	52	12	7	5	28	115	170	−55	55	Advance to HockeyAllsvenskan qualifiers
14	IK Oskarshamn	52	8	5	2	37	104	168	−64	36	Advance to HockeyAllsvenskan qualifiers

(R) Relegated

== Playoffs ==
Teams ranked 4th through 7th met in a best-of-three elimination playoff, the winner of which continued to the Elitserien qualifiers (Swedish: Kvalserien). Starting with the following season, this playoff round was replaced by a double-round robin group stage.

In the first round, Almtuna and Malmö each beat their opponents (Mora and Bofors), both 2–0 in games. Almtuna then beat Malmö 2–1 in games in the second round, to continue to the Elitserien qualifier.

=== Bracket ===
Round 1
4	Almtuna IS	5	5	–	2
7	Mora IK	4	2	–	0
5	IF Malmö Redhawks	2	3	–	2
6	Bofors IK	1	1	–	0

Round 2
4	Almtuna IS	1	4	5	2
5	IF Malmö Redhawks	2	1	2	1

=== First round ===
Almtuna IS vs Mora IK (2–0) game log

March 10, 2010	Mora IK	4 – 5 OT (2–0, 2–3, 0–1, 0–1)	Almtuna IS	FM Mattsson Arena, Mora; Attendance: 2128

Game reference

March 12, 2010	Almtuna IS	5 – 2 (2–1, 3–1, 0–0)	Mora IK	Gränbyhallen, Uppsala; Attendance: 2128

Game reference

IF Malmö Redhawks vs Bofors IK (2–0) game log

March 10, 2010	Bofors IK	1 – 2 (0–1, 1–0, 0–1)	IF Malmö Redhawks	Nobelhallen, Karlskoga; Attendance: 3017

Game reference

March 12, 2010	IF Malmö Redhawks	3 – 1 (2–0, 1–1, 0–0)	Bofors IK	Malmö Arena, Malmö; Attendance: 6301

Game reference

=== Second round ===
Almtuna IS vs IF Malmö Redhawks (2–1) game log

March 16, 2010	Malmö Redhawks	2 – 1 (0–0, 0–1, 2–0)	Almtuna IS	Malmö Arena, Malmö; Attendance: 5774

Game reference

March 18, 2010	Almtuna IS	4 – 1 (1–1, 2–0, 1–0)	Malmö Redhawks	Gränbyhallen, Uppsala; Attendance: 2420

Game reference

March 19, 2010	Almtuna IS	5 – 2 (1–1, 2–0, 2–1)	IF Malmö Redhawks	Gränbyhallen, Uppsala; Attendance: 2164

Game reference

== Elitserien qualifiers ==
2010 Kvalserien		GP	W	T	L	OTW/SOW	OTL/SOL	GF	GA	DIF	PTS
1	Södertälje SK	10	5	5	0	1	4	34	28	+6	21
2	AIK	10	5	2	3	1	1	29	24	+5	18
3	Rögle BK	10	3	4	3	3	1	31	26	+5	16
4	Leksands IF	10	4	2	4	2	0	25	24	+1	16
5	Almtuna IS	10	3	3	3	1	2	23	23	0	13
6	Växjö Lakers HC	10	1	2	7	1	1	29	46	−17	6

== HockeyAllsvenskan qualifiers ==
Pos	Team	Pld	W	OTW	OTL	L	GF	GA	GD	Pts	Qualification
1	IK Oskarshamn	10	7	1	0	2	33	20	+13	23	Qualify for the 2011–12 HockeyAllsvenskan season
2	Tingsryds AIF (P)	10	7	0	0	3	35	25	+10	21	Qualify for the 2011–12 HockeyAllsvenskan season
3	IF Sundsvall Hockey	10	4	1	2	3	32	30	+2	16	Qualify for HockeyAllsvenskan due to the relegation of IF Björklöven
4	Nybro Vikings IF	10	4	0	1	5	21	27	−6	13	Qualify for the 2011–12 Division 1 season
5	Olofströms IK	10	3	0	0	7	24	36	−12	9	Qualify for the 2011–12 Division 1 season
6	Enköpings SK HK	10	2	1	0	7	27	34	−7	8	Qualify for the 2011–12 Division 1 season

(P) Promoted
