= 2005–06 HockeyAllsvenskan season =

- League: HockeyAllsvenskan
- Sport: Ice hockey
- Number of teams: 15 (one team withdrew mid-season due to bankruptcy)
- Total attendance: 628,869
- Average attendance: 1,996
- First place: IF Malmö Redhawks
- Top scorer: Johan Åkerman (SAIK)
- Promoted to HockeyAllsvenskan to Elitserien: IF Malmö Redhawks; Skellefteå AIK
- Relegated to Division 1 from HockeyAllsvenskan: None

HockeyAllsvenskan seasons
- ← 2004–05 2006–07 →

The 2005–06 HockeyAllsvenskan season was the first season of the HockeyAllsvenskan, the second level of ice hockey in Sweden. The season originally featured 16 teams, but due to Halmstad Hammers HC's bankruptcy mid-season in November 2005, the season only featured 15 teams. The top four teams qualified for the Kvalserien, with the opportunity to be promoted to the Elitserien.

== Participating teams ==
2006–07 HockeyAllsvenskan teams. The Halmstad Hammers, marked in gray, were disqualified due to bankruptcy.

== Regular season ==
	Club	GP	W	OTW	T	OTL	L	GF	GA	Pts
1.	Malmö Redhawks	42	33	2	0	1	6	180	70	104
2.	Skellefteå AIK	42	30	4	4	0	4	186	92	102
3.	Bofors IK	42	24	3	1	0	14	153	119	79
4.	Rögle BK	42	21	1	2	3	15	126	103	70
5.	IF Björklöven	42	21	1	3	1	16	118	107	69
6.	AIK	42	16	1	6	5	14	116	123	61
7.	Almtuna IS	42	14	6	2	5	15	115	127	61
8.	IK Oskarshamn	42	13	5	7	4	13	115	119	60
9.	Västerås IK	42	13	4	7	5	13	110	99	59
10.	Växjö Lakers HC	42	14	2	6	3	17	129	138	55
11.	IK Nyköping	42	10	3	4	3	22	104	154	43
12.	Nybro IF	42	9	4	2	6	21	107	159	43
13.	IF Sundsvall Hockey	42	10	0	7	3	22	87	139	40
14.	Hammarby IF	42	9	4	4	0	25	99	140	39
15.	IFK Arboga IK	42	7	2	3	3	27	101	157	31
	Halmstad Hammers HC	Disqualified due to bankruptcy								

== Kvalserien ==
	Club	GP	W	OTW	T	OTL	L	GF	GA	Pts
1.	Malmö Redhawks	10	8	0	0	0	2	43	22	24
2.	Skellefteå AIK	10	7	0	0	0	3	36	23	21
3.	Södertälje SK	10	5	0	1	1	3	35	27	17
4.	Rögle BK	10	5	0	0	0	5	24	28	15
5.	Leksands IF	10	3	0	1	0	6	23	34	10
6.	Bofors IK	10	0	1	0	0	9	19	46	2

== Relegation round ==
	Club	GP	W	OTW	T	OTL	L	GF	GA	Pts
1.	Huddinge IK	8	5	0	0	0	3	31	26	15
2.	IFK Arboga IK	8	4	0	0	2	2	25	22	14
3.	Hammarby IF*	8	4	1	0	0	3	25	24	14
4.	Piteå HC	8	3	1	0	1	3	18	16	12
5.	Mariestad BoIS HC	8	1	1	0	0	6	14	25	5

*Due to Halmstad Hammers HC's bankruptcy, the relegation round's third-place team, Hammarby IF, also qualified for the following HockeyAllsvenskan season.
