= Be-Ge Hockey Center =

Arena in Oskarshamn, Sweden

Coordinates: 57°15′49.6″N 16°26′09.6″E

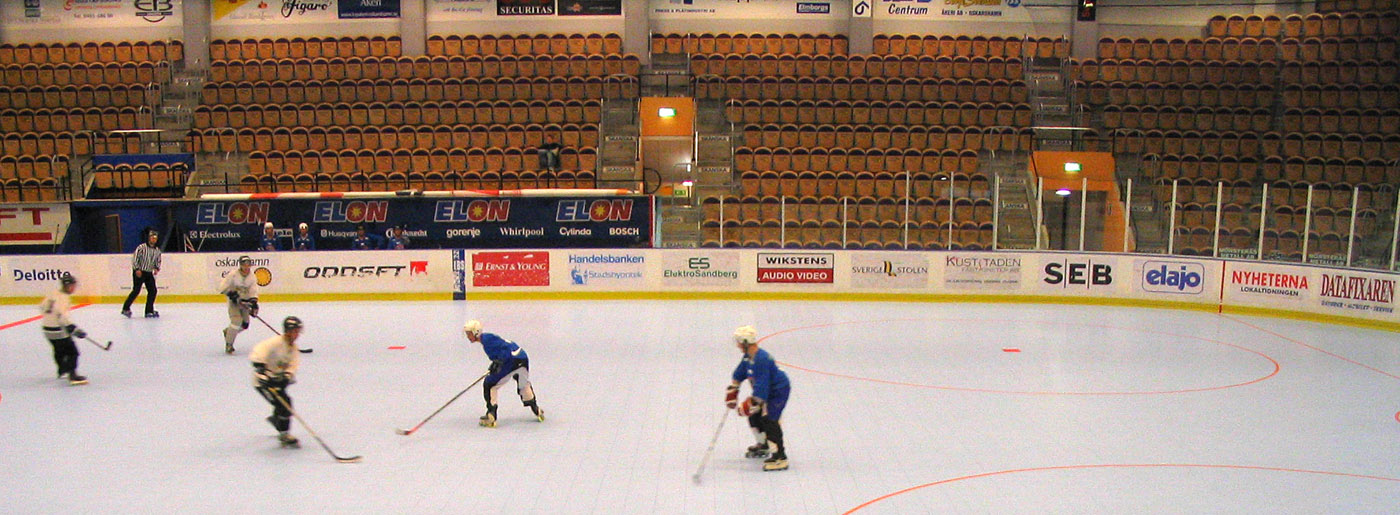
- A May 2007 inline hockey game inside the Arena Oskarshamn.
- Interactive map of Be-Ge Hockey Center
- Former names: Oskarshamns ishall Arena Oskarshamn
- Address: Sweden
- Location: Oskarshamn
- Type: Indoor ice hockey rink

Construction
- Opened: 10 November 1974
- Renovated: 2004–2005

Tenant
- IK Oskarshamn

Be-Ge Hockey Center, formerly Arena Oskarshamn, is the home ice of Swedish ice-hockey team IK Oskarshamn, located in the south-east of Sweden. The arena was completely rebuilt and renovated in 2004-2005 and has a capacity of 3,275 people (2018/2019).

The arena, earlier known as Oskarshamns ishall, was inaugurated on 10 November 1974, with a game where Old Team Sweden defeated IK Oskarshamn, back then known as IK70, 6–2, in front of 2,600 spectators. The first international game inside the arena was played on 15 December 1974, a junior game where the Soviet Union defeated Sweden, 5–2.
