= Västerås IK =

- City: Västerås, Sweden
- League: HockeyAllsvenskan
- Founded: 1913
- Home arena: ABB Arena Nord
- Colours: Yellow, black
- General manager: Niklas Johansson
- Head coach: Tero Lehterä
- Website: vik.se

Franchise history
- 2000–2005: Västerås IK
- 2005–2018: VIK Hockey
- 2018–present: Västerås IK

Previous franchise history
- 1939–2000: Västerås IK Hockey

Västerås IK (Västerås Ishockey klubb) is a professional ice hockey club from Västerås, Sweden. The team is currently playing in the second-tier league in Sweden, HockeyAllsvenskan. Västerås IK played 12 seasons in the top Swedish league Elitserien (1988–89 to 1999–00) before the club went bankrupt and merged with the junior club (Västerås IK Ungdom), which changed name to VIK Västerås HK in 2005. In 2018, after playing a year in tier three, Hockeyettan, the club changed it name back to the old name Västerås IK.

== History ==
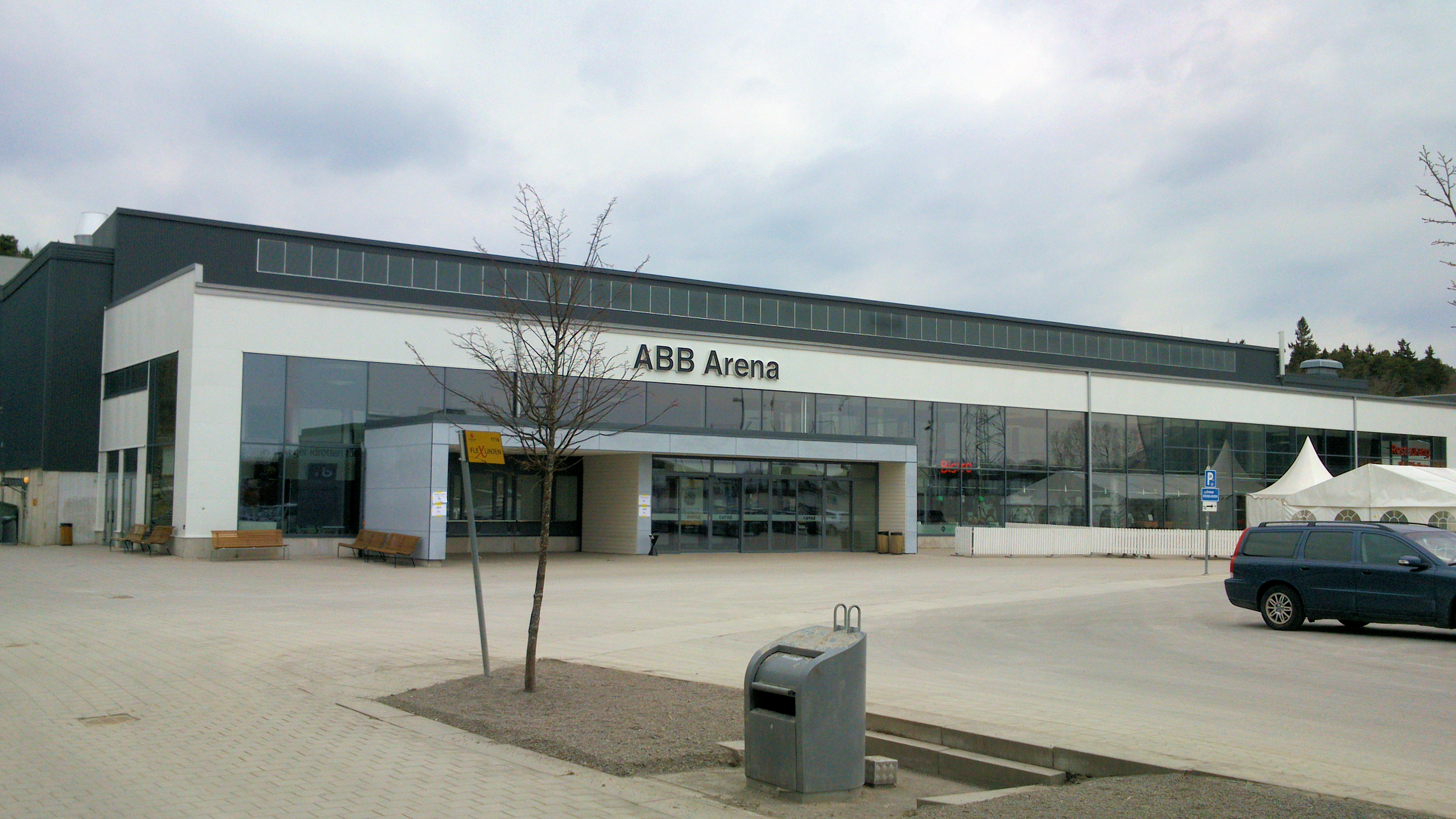
ABB Arena Nord in Västerås, Sweden. Home ground of VVästerås IK .

Västerås IK was founded in 1913 and started playing ice hockey in 1939. The ice hockey section of Västerås IK was later separated and was active until 2000, when the club folded and the A team was moved to the club Västerås IK Ungdom (English: junior), which changed to its current name in 2018.

== Season-by-season ==
This list features only the ten most recent seasons. For a more complete list, see List of VIK Västerås HK seasons.

Year	Level	Division	Record		Avg. home atnd.	Notes	Ref.
Year	Level	Division	Position	W-T-L W-OT-L	Avg. home atnd.	Notes	Ref.
2007–08	Tier 2	HockeyAllsvenskan	5th of 16	24–7–14	2,467		
2007–08	Tier 2	Playoff to Elitserien qualifier	—	4–1	3,576	Won in 1st round, 2–1 in games vs Växjö Lakers HC; Won in 2nd round, 2–0 in games vs Borås HC	
2007–08	Elitserien qualifier		6th of 6	1–0–9	3,875		
2008–09	Tier 2	HockeyAllsvenskan	3rd of 16	24–2–6–13	2,573		
2008–09	Elitserien qualifier		6th of 6	2–1–1–6	3,605		
2009–10	Tier 2	HockeyAllsvenskan	8th of 14	21–3–5–23	2,129		
2010–11	Tier 2	HockeyAllsvenskan	5th of 14	26–2–7–17	2,404		
2010–11	Tier 2	Promotion pre-qualifier	2nd	2–1–1–2	2,310		
2011–12	Tier 2	HockeyAllsvenskan	4th of 14	29–1–6–16	2,665		
2011–12	Tier 2	Promotion pre-qualifier	4th	1–0–1–4	1,547		
2012–13	Tier 2	HockeyAllsvenskan	3rd of 14	28–5–4–15	3,326		
2012–13	Elitserien qualifier		4th of 6	3–1–1–5	3,918		
2013–14	Tier 2	HockeyAllsvenskan	2nd of 14	26–9–4–13	3,170		
2013–14	Elitserien qualifier		6th of 6	2–1–1–6	4,032		
2014–15	Tier 2	HockeyAllsvenskan	1st of 14	28–4–6–14	3,578		
2014–15	Tier 2	HockeyAllsvenskan finals	—	1–0–1–2	4,833	Lost 3–1 in games to Karlskrona HK	
2014–15	SHL qualifiers		—	1–0–0–4	4,108	Lost 4–1 in games to Rögle BK	
2015–16	Tier 2	HockeyAllsvenskan	9th of 14	20–3–9–20	3,346		
2016–17	Tier 2	HockeyAllsvenskan	13th of 14	13–4–3–32	2,860		
2016–17	HockeyAllsvenskan qualifiers		4th of 6	3–3–0–4	2,618		
2017–18	Tier 3	HockeyEttan West	1st of 14	16–3–3	2,258		
2017–18	HockeyAllsvenskan qualifiers		2nd of 6	5-2-3	3,903		
2018–19	Tier 2	HockeyAllsvenskan	3rd of 14	26–6–3–17	3,375		
2018–19	Tier 2	HockeyAllsvenskan playoffs	2nd of 6	3–1–0–1	4,101		

== Famous players ==
- Mikael Backlund
- Patrik Berglund
- Anders Berglund
- Magnus Eriksson
- Erik Ersberg
- Mishat Fahrutdinov
- Mats Ytter
- Patrik Juhlin
- Nicklas Lidström
- Pär Mårts
- Peter Popovic
- Leif Rohlin
- Tommy Salo
- Göran "Flygis" Sjöberg
- Aleksei Salomatin
- Rickard Wallin
- Uno Öhrlund
- Fredrik Johansson
