= 2011–12 HockeyAllsvenskan season =

- League: HockeyAllsvenskan
- Sport: Ice hockey
- Duration: 52 regular-season matches
- Number of teams: 14
- Total attendance: 949,928 (regular season)
- Average attendance: 2,610 (regular season)
- TV partner(s): Viasat
- First place: Örebro HK
- Top scorer: (United States) Broc Little (VIK)
- Promoted to SEL: Rögle BK
- Relegated to Division 1: IF Sundsvall Hockey; Borås HC*; *Denied elite license for the following season

HockeyAllsvenskan seasons
- ← 2010–11 2012–13 →

The 2011–12 HockeyAllsvenskan season was the 7th season of HockeyAllsvenskan. The regular season started on 17 September 2011 and ended on 2 March 2012. The following Playoff round for the final spot in the 2012 Kvalserien started on 4 March and ended on 12 March 2012.

== Participating teams ==
2011–12 HockeyAllsvenskan teams

Team	City	Arena	Capacity
Almtuna IS	Uppsala	Gränbyhallen	2,562
BIK Karlskoga	Karlskoga	Nobelhallen	6,300
Borås HC	Borås	Borås Ishall	3,860
Leksands IF	Leksand	Tegera Arena	7,650
IF Malmö Redhawks	Malmö	Malmö Arena	13,000
Mora IK	Mora	FM Mattsson Arena	4,514
IK Oskarshamn	Oskarshamn	Arena Oskarshamn	3,346
Rögle BK	Ängelholm	Lindab Arena	5,150
IF Sundsvall Hockey	Sundsvall	Gärdehov	2,500
Södertälje SK	Södertälje	AXA Sports Center	6,130
Tingsryds AIF	Tingsryd	Nelson Garden Arena	3,400
Troja/Ljungby	Ljungby	Sunnerbohov	3,700
Västerås HK	Västerås	ABB Arena	5,800
Örebro HK	Örebro	Behrn Arena	4,400

== Standings ==
Pos	Team	Pld	W	OTW	OTL	L	GF	GA	GD	Pts	Qualification
1	Örebro HK	52	32	2	2	16	173	132	+41	102	Advance to Elitserien qualifiers
2	Leksands IF	52	27	7	5	13	152	101	+51	100	Advance to Elitserien qualifiers
3	Bofors IK Karlskoga	52	30	4	1	17	149	120	+29	99	Advance to Elitserien qualifiers
4	VIK Västerås	52	29	1	6	16	157	116	+41	95	Advance to pre-qualifiers
5	Rögle BK	52	21	7	8	16	171	150	+21	85	Advance to pre-qualifiers
6	IK Oskarshamn	52	23	4	5	20	146	145	+1	82	Advance to pre-qualifiers
7	Malmö Redhawks	52	22	6	3	21	139	140	−1	81	Advance to pre-qualifiers
8	Mora IK	52	22	5	4	21	168	144	+24	80	
9	Södertälje SK	52	22	2	6	22	110	120	−10	76	
10	IF Troja/Ljungby	52	19	4	4	25	134	154	−20	69	
11	Almtuna IS	52	16	5	6	25	119	143	−24	64	
12	Tingsryds AIF	52	15	4	5	28	110	151	−41	58	
13	Borås HC	52	13	4	4	31	114	167	−53	51	Advance to HockeyAllsvenskan qualifiers
14	IF Sundsvall	52	11	7	3	31	123	182	−59	50	Advance to HockeyAllsvenskan qualifiers

== Playoff round ==
In the Playoff round, each team played a round-robin, facing each team twice – once at home and once on the road, giving a total of six games per team. The 4th seed from the regular season was awarded four extra points, the 5th seed three points, the 6th seed two points, and the 7th seed got one point. Rögle BK finished first and got the final spot in the 2012 Kvalserien qualification tournament for Elitserien.

Pos	Team	Pld	W	OTW/SOW	OTL/SOL	L	GF	GA	GD	BP	Pts
1	Rögle BK	6	2	2	0	2	22	14	+8	3	13
2	Malmö Redhawks	6	4	0	0	2	19	13	+6	1	13
3	IK Oskarshamn	6	3	0	1	2	11	17	−6	2	12
4	VIK Västerås	6	1	0	1	4	13	21	−8	4	8

=== Game log ===
2012 Playoff game log
March

Round	Date	Home	Result	Away	Venue	Attendance
1	March 4	Malmö Redhawks	3–5	VIK Västerås HK	Malmö Arena	4,259
1	March 4	IK Oskarshamn	2–3 OT	Rögle BK	Arena Oskarshamn	2,565
2	March 6	VIK Västerås HK	2–3	IK Oskarshamn	ABB Arena	2,202
2	March 6	Rögle BK	1–3	Malmö Redhawks	Lindab Arena	4,393
3	March 7	Rögle BK	4–1	VIK Västerås HK	Lindab Arena	2,444
3	March 7	IK Oskarshamn	2–4	Malmö Redhawks	Arena Oskarshamn	2,728
4	March 9	VIK Västerås HK	3–4 SO	Rögle BK	ABB Arena	1,713
4	March 9	Malmö Redhawks	0–1	IK Oskarshamn	Malmö Arena	5,908
5	March 11	IK Oskarshamn	3–1	VIK Västerås HK	Arena Oskarshamn	2,713
5	March 11	Malmö Redhawks	5–3	Rögle BK	Malmö Arena	8,635
6	March 12	VIK Västerås HK	1–4	Malmö Redhawks	ABB Arena	728
6	March 12	Rögle BK	7–0	IK Oskarshamn	Lindab Arena	3,198

== Relegation round ==
Pos	Team	Pld	W	OTW	SOW	OTL	SOL	L	GF	GA	GD	Pts
1	Karlskrona HK	10	8	0	0	0	0	2	39	23	+16	24
2	Borås HC (Note: Borås HC was relegated to Division 1 due to no elite license. They were replaced by Asplöven HC for the following HockeyAllsvenskan season.)	10	5	0	1	0	1	3	29	27	+2	18
3	Asplöven HC	10	5	0	0	0	1	4	27	23	+4	16
4	Olofströms IK	10	4	1	0	0	1	4	35	29	+6	15
5	IF Sundsvall	10	4	0	1	0	0	5	22	33	−11	14
6	Kallinge-Ronneby IF	10	0	0	1	1	0	8	22	39	−17	3

Updated to match(es) played on unknown. Source:
