= 2010–11 HockeyAllsvenskan season =

- League: HockeyAllsvenskan
- Sport: Ice hockey
- Duration: 52 regular season-matches per team
- Teams: 14
- Total attendance: 860,294 (regular season)
- Average attendance: 2,363 (regular season)
- First place: Växjö Lakers HC
- Top scorer: (Sweden) Conny Strömberg (ÖHK)
- Promoted to SEL: Växjö Lakers
- Relegated to Division 1: None

HockeyAllsvenskan seasons
- 2009–10 2011–12

The 2010–11 HockeyAllsvenskan season was the sixth season of the HockeyAllsvenskan, the second level of ice hockey in Sweden. 14 teams participated in the league, and the top four qualified for the Kvalserien, with the opportunity to be promoted to the Elitserien.

== Overview ==
2010–11 HockeyAllsvenskan teams

Team	Location	Arena	Capacity	Average attendance
Almtuna IS	Uppsala	Gränbyhallen	2,562	1,454
Bofors IK	Karlskoga	Nobelhallen	6,300	1,661
Borås HC	Borås	Borås Ishall	3,700	1,016
IF Malmö Redhawks	Malmö	Malmö Arena	13,000	4,437
IF Sundsvall Hockey	Sundsvall	Gärdehov	2,500	926
IF Troja/Ljungby	Ljungby	Sunnerbohov	3,620	1,432
IK Oskarshamn	Oskarshamn	Arena Oskarshamn	3,424	2,272
Leksands IF	Leksand	Tegera Arena	7,650	4,842
Mora IK	Mora	FM Mattsson Arena	4,500	2,259
Rögle BK	Ängelholm	Lindab Arena	5,150	3,119
Tingsryds AIF	Tingsryd	Dackehallen	4,294	2,346
VIK Västerås HK	Västerås	ABB Arena Nord	5,800	2,404
Växjö Lakers HC	Växjö	Växjö Ishall	4,015	2,749
Örebro HK	Örebro	Behrn Arena	4,400	2,163

== Regular season ==
=== Standings ===
Pos	Team	Pld	W	OTW	OTL	L	GF	GA	GD	Pts	Qualification
1	Växjö Lakers	52	33	3	2	14	192	129	+63	107	Advance to Elitserien qualifiers
2	Rögle BK	52	26	9	2	15	161	122	+39	98	Advance to Elitserien qualifiers
3	Örebro HK	52	26	7	5	14	177	136	+41	97	Advance to Elitserien qualifiers
4	Leksands IF	52	23	7	7	15	156	129	+27	90	Advance to pre-qualifiers
5	VIK Västerås	52	26	2	7	17	150	119	+31	89	Advance to pre-qualifiers
6	Almtuna IS	52	21	10	3	18	141	129	+12	86	Advance to pre-qualifiers
7	Mora IK	52	23	3	9	17	158	153	+5	84	Advance to pre-qualifiers
8	Malmö Redhawks	52	21	4	9	18	153	144	+9	80	
9	IK Oskarshamn	52	20	6	6	20	150	159	−9	78	
10	Bofors IK	52	17	5	7	23	143	156	−13	68	
11	Borås HC	52	17	6	3	26	150	167	−17	66	
12	IF Sundsvall	52	11	5	7	29	125	186	−61	50	
13	IF Troja/Ljungby	52	13	3	5	31	151	218	−67	50	Advance to HockeyAllsvenskan qualifiers
14	Tingsryds AIF	52	10	7	5	30	121	181	−60	49	Advance to HockeyAllsvenskan qualifiers

== Postseason ==
=== Pre-qualifiers ===
Pos	Team	Pld	W	OTW	OTL	L	GF	GA	GD	Pts	Qualification
1	Mora IK	6	6	0	0	0	23	9	+14	18	Advance to Elitserien qualifiers
2	VIK Västerås HK	6	2	1	1	2	14	13	+1	9	
3	Leksands IF	6	2	1	0	3	12	16	−4	8	
4	Almtuna IS	6	0	0	1	5	11	22	−11	1	

== Kvalserien ==
2011 Kvalserien		GP	W	T	L	OTW/SOW	OTL/SOL	GF	GA	DIF	PTS
1	Växjö Lakers HC	10	7	3	0	2	1	36	17	+19	26
2	Modo Hockey	10	5	4	1	1	3	30	15	+15	20
3	Södertälje SK	10	4	3	3	2	1	27	24	+3	17
4	Rögle BK	10	3	2	5	1	1	29	31	−2	13
5	Örebro HK	10	2	2	6	0	2	29	43	−14	8
6	Mora IK	10	2	0	8	0	0	22	43	−21	6

== Relegation round ==
Pos	Team	Pld	W	OTW	OTL	L	GF	GA	GD	Pts	Qualification
1	IF Troja/Ljungby	10	7	1	0	2	37	23	+14	23	Qualify for the 2011–12 HockeyAllsvenskan season
2	Tingsryds AIF	10	5	1	2	2	34	24	+10	19	Qualify for the 2011–12 HockeyAllsvenskan season
3	Karlskrona HK	10	5	1	1	3	24	18	+6	18	Qualify for the 2011–12 Division 1 season
4	Huddinge IK	10	5	1	0	4	38	26	+12	17	Qualify for the 2011–12 Division 1 season
5	Asplöven HC	10	1	1	2	6	24	53	−29	7	Qualify for the 2011–12 Division 1 season
6	HC Vita Hästen	10	1	1	1	7	27	40	−13	6	Qualify for the 2011–12 Division 1 season
