= HockeyAllsvenskan =

Second level of Swedish men's ice hockey

- Current season, competition or edition: 2026–27 HockeyAllsvenskan season
- Sport: Ice hockey
- Founded: 2005
- No. of teams: 14
- Country: Sweden
- Most recent champion: IF Björklöven
- Broadcaster: C More
- Promotion to: SHL
- Relegation to: Hockeyettan
- Website: HockeyAllsvenskan.se

HockeyAllsvenskan (previously Allsvenskan and SuperAllsvenskan) is a professional ice hockey league, and the second-highest league in the Swedish ice hockey system, after the SHL. Since the 2009–10 season, the league has consisted of fourteen teams.

== Previous leagues called Allsvenskan ==
During seasons 1948–49 through 1974–75 Allsvenskan was the semi-official name of the first-level league, the official name being Division 1 norra (north) and södra (south), comprising six teams each until 1955–56 and eight teams each from 1956–57 to 1973–74. In 1974–75 it was played as one Division 1 league with sixteen teams, leading up to the start in the 1975–76 season of the present SHL.

The second highest-level league had been called Division 2 since 1941–42, and was divided into eight groups from 1957 to 1958 on. The winners of these groups played in two qualification leagues, a northern and a southern one, from which two teams each were promoted. In the 1974–75 season the grouping was changed to have six groups. Each qualification league contained the winners of three groups and one each of the teams on places nine and ten in the sixteen-team league Allsvenskan.

When the then-named Elitserien started in 1975–76 as the top level with ten teams, the new second highest-level league was called Division 1, in four groups. After a couple of years, it was settled into ten teams each in these. Until the 1981–82 season the Division 1 leagues were played over the entire season and followed by play-offs and Kvalserien, the qualification league for the Elitserien.

In 1982–83, however, the name Allsvenskan came back, for a league starting after the Christmas and New Year's break of the season. The top two teams of each Division 1 league were promoted to the new Allsvenskan. The top two teams in the Allsvenskan played a best-of-five final for promotion to Elitserien. The teams 3–6 in the Allsvenskan continued with play-offs and possibly Kvalserien for the second open spot in the Elitserien.

For the 1987–88 season the Elitserien was expanded from ten to twelve teams, and now also the two last teams in Elitserien by the end of the year were moved down for play in the Allsvenskan together with the top eight Division 1 teams. Still with a best of five final between the top two teams, and play-offs for teams 3–8.

From the 1996–97 season, the Elitserien changed and played with all twelve teams for the entire season. The Allsvenskan changed back to the eight top teams from Division 1 only. The best of five final was also abandoned. From here on, the top two teams were promoted directly to Kvalserien, while the teams finishing 3-6 played play-offs for two more spots in Kvalserien.

In the 1999–2000 season, Allsvenskan Norra (north) and Södra (south) were inaugurated as a completely new second-level league, consisting of twelve teams each. The top four teams from each of them were promoted for the later half of the season to the same kind of league as the previous years of Allsvenskan, but that league was named SuperAllsvenskan. In the 1999–2000 season, no Kvalserien was played for survival in Allsvenskan; instead, the four worst teams in Allsvenskan were relegated to Division 1 (now named Hockeyettan) while the four best teams in Division 1 were promoted to Allsvenskan.

For the 2005–06 season, the number of teams was decreased from 2x12 to 16 (currently 14). The Norra and Södra sections were merged into a joint league named HockeyAllsvenskan, and the SuperAllsvenskan league was scrapped. HockeyAllsvenskan covers the entire regular season.

== Present HockeyAllsvenskan ==
The league is played as a round-robin tournament where all teams play each other four times during one season, twice at home and twice on the road, for a total of 52 games per team.

After the regular season, teams 1 and 2 play the HockeyAllsvenskan Final in best of five games, and teams 3-8 play the HockeyAllsvenskan Slutspelsserie, a single meeting round robin tournament, where teams 3–5 start with 3, 2 and 1 bonus points, respectively, and play one more game at home.

The winner of the HockeyAllsvenskan Final gets to challenge team 14 from the SHL in best of seven games for their spot in the league.

The loser in the HockeyAllsvenskan Final faces the winner from the Slutspelsserie in best of three games, and the winner from this stage gets to challenge team 13 from the SHL in best of seven games for their spot in the league.

The two last placed teams from HockeyAllsvenskan have to play in the Kvalserien qualification against four Hockeyettan (tier III, formerly Division 1) teams to avoid relegation.

For the 2009–10 season, the number of teams in the league was decreased from sixteen to fourteen. In the 2008–09 season the last placed team was directly relegated, and the teams ranked fourteen and fifteen played in the qualification league, from which only the best team was qualified for the next HockeyAllsvenskan season.

== 2025–26 participating teams ==
HockeyAllsvenskan team map

Team	City	Arena	Capacity
AIK	Stockholm	Hovet	8,094
Almtuna IS	Uppsala	Upplands Bilforum Arena	2,800
IF Björklöven	Umeå	A3 Arena	5,400
Kalmar HC	Kalmar	Hatstore Arena	2,500
BIK Karlskoga	Karlskoga	Nobelhallen	6,300
Modo Hockey	Örnsköldsvik	Hägglunds Arena	7,625
Mora IK	Mora	Smidjegrav Arena	4,500
Nybro Vikings	Nybro	Liljas Arena	2,380
IK Oskarshamn	Oskarshamn	Be-Ge Hockey Center	3,275
Södertälje SK	Södertälje	Scaniarinken	6,200
IF Troja-Ljungby	Ljungby	Ljungby Arena	3,620
Västerås IK	Västerås	ABB Arena Nord	4,902
Vimmerby HC	Vimmerby	VBO Arena	1,750
Östersunds IK	Östersund	Östersund Arena	2,700

== Attendance ==
HockeyAllsvenskan has seen a significant increase in average attendance per game since the first season of HockeyAllsvenskan in 2005–06. In the 2011–12 season, HockeyAllsvenskan had the highest average attendance number of any second-tier league in Europe, averaging 2,606 spectators per game. The following season, 2012–13, which was strengthened by the NHL lockout, the average attendance increased to 3,227 spectators per game, a 23.8% increase over the 2011–12 season; HockeyAllsvenskan remained the European second-tier league with the highest average attendance as a result. This dramatic increase can be explained by the fact that Djurgårdens IF, who replaced Rögle BK's position in the league as a result of the 2012 Kvalserien, averaged 6,184 spectators per game compared to Rögle who just averaged 2,973 spectators; as well as the fact that Karlskrona HK and Asplöven HC, who replaced IF Sundsvall Hockey and Borås HC as a result of the 2012 Kvalserien for HockeyAllsvenskan, averaged 2,161 spectators per game (combined) while Sundsvall and Borås just averaged 1,033 spectators. Also, Örebro HK increased their average attendance from 2,445 to 3,618 spectators per game. In seven years, the average attendance increased from 1,996 in the 2005–06 season to 3,227 spectators per game in the 2012–13 season, an increase of 61.7%. The following season saw a slight drop to 3,016 spectators per game, a decrease of 6.5% from the 2012–13 season.

=== Attendance statistics ===
Average attendance season-by-season
Season	Spectators
2005–06	1,996
2006–07	1,887
2007–08	2,007
2008–09	2,363
2009–10	2,362
2010–11	2,363
2011–12	2,610
2012–13	3,227
2013–14	3,016
2014–15	2,986
2015–16	2,514
2016–17	2,637
2017–18	2,705
2018–19	2,713
2019–20	2,606

Club with highest average attendance
Season	Team	Attendance
2005–06	IF Björklöven	3,423
2006–07	Leksands IF	4,127
2007–08	Leksands IF	5,152
2008–09	IF Malmö Redhawks	5,916
2009–10	IF Malmö Redhawks	5,592
2010–11	Leksands IF	4,842
2011–12	IF Malmö Redhawks	6,114
2012–13	Djurgårdens IF	6,184
2013–14	Djurgårdens IF	6,142
2014–15	IF Malmö Redhawks	6,258
2015–16	Leksands IF	4,576
2016–17	MODO Hockey	4,031
2017–18	Leksands IF	5,140
2018–19	AIK	4,698
2019–20	IF Björklöven	4,754

== Television ==
C More Entertainment has had the broadcast rights for HockeyAllsvenskan since 2015, with a selection of games being broadcast on television and the remainder being streamed online. They replaced Viasat who had the broadcast rights from 2009 from 2015.

== Previous seasons ==
=== 2005–06 season ===
Halmstad played in HockeyAllsvenskan this season, but due to the club's bankruptcy the team was disqualified. In Kvalserien, Malmö and Skellefteå were promoted to play in Elitserien for the 2006–07 season. Leksand and Södertälje were both relegated from Elitserien.

Arboga and Hammarby had to play the relegation rounds but managed to keep their spots in the league, coming in second respectively third after Huddinge, who had been relegated one year previously, but made it back after one year in Division 1.

=== 2006–07 season ===
In the qualification rounds for Elitserien, Södertälje advanced to Elitserien while Malmö only finished third and was relegated to HockeyAllsvenskan.

This season, Huddinge and Arboga had to play in the qualification series to stay in the league, but Arboga decided not to play because of their bad economic state of affairs. This meant that Arboga joined Division 1 in the 2007–08 season. Huddinge won the qualification series and thus continued to play in HockeyAllsvenskan for yet another season, while Borås finished second and advanced to HockeyAllsvenskan.

=== 2007–08 season ===
In a closely played qualification battle for Elitserien, Rögle advanced to Elitserien at the cost of Mora who finished fourth and was relegated to HockeyAllsvenskan.

Huddinge and Hammarby finished last in the league this year and had to play in the qualification series to stay up. Hammarby, however, decided not to play because of economic issues (the team later went bankrupt). Huddinge did not survive the qualification group which was won by the following season's newcomers Troja/Ljungby and Mariestad. However, in the summer, Nyköping was relegated to Division 1, not meeting the financial demands for being approved to play in the HockeyAllsvenskan (known as the elite license), and Huddinge was promoted to fill in that spot.

=== 2008–09 season ===
The 2008–09 season became the last season with sixteen teams in HockeyAllsvenskan. On May 30, 2008, the board of the SIHA decided to decrease the number of teams to fourteen, starting from the 2009–10 season.

In Kvalserien, none of the four top teams from HockeyAllsvenskan succeeded in qualifying for the highest division this year. Instead, the two Elitserien teams Södertälje and Rögle managed to keep their spots.

Because of the decreased number of teams for the next season, the last-placed team, Mariestad, was directly relegated to the lower division instead of joining the teams placed 14th and 15th who had to play the qualification group against four teams from Division 1. With just one team qualifying for HockeyAllsvenskan this season, neither Nybro (third) nor Huddinge (fourth) succeeded in staying in the second division. Instead, Örebro took the available spot in HockeyAllsvenskan for the 2009–10 season.

=== 2009–10 season ===
In Kvalserien, AIK managed to promote to Elitserien at the expense of Rögle.

Sundsvall and Oskarshamn ended up at the bottom of the league table and had to play a qualification series to requalify for HockeyAllsvenskan. There Tingsryd came in second after Oskarshamn, earning promotion at the expense of Sundsvall. However, in June the Swedish Ice Hockey Association (SIHA) decided not to grant Björklöven elite license for the upcoming season due to financial concerns and thus Björklöven was relegated to Division 1 and Sundsvall was given a spot in HockeyAllsvenskan next season.

With AIK advancing to the Elitserien, and no other team from the area in the league, nor any new one promoted from Division 1, this meant that the 2010–11 season would be the first time ever with no team from the Stockholm area in the second-level league of Swedish ice hockey.

=== 2010–11 season ===
In Kvalserien, Växjö managed to promote to Elitserien at the expense of Södertälje. (With Södertälje back in HockeyAllsvenskan, the Stockholm area was re-established on the second level.)

The qualification system for the teams 4–7 to qualify for Kvalserien was changed this season. Instead of a kind-of-playoff series, a "pre-qualification" system was used. The 4th ranked team from HockeyAllsvenskan started with 4 points, the 5th ranked team with 3 points, the 6th ranked team with 2 points, and the 7th ranked team with 1 point. The teams met each other two times, giving a total of 6 rounds. The 7th ranked team, which was Mora, won the pre-qualification and thus reached the Kvalserien.

Troja/Ljungby and Tingsryd ended at 13th and 14th place respectively and thus were forced to play in the Kvalserien for HockeyAllsvenskan. Troja/Ljungby and Tingsryd ended 1st and 2nd respectively in the Kvalserien and thus stayed in HockeyAllsvenskan for the 2011–12 season. This also meant that no team from Division 1 qualified for HockeyAllsvenskan this season.

=== 2011–12 season ===
In Kvalserien, Rögle promoted to Elitserien at the expense of Djurgården. Rögle became the first HockeyAllsvenskan playoff team in history to promote to Elitserien, a feat which Örebro HK subsequently duplicated in 2013.

In Kvalserien for HockeyAllsvenskan, Borås re-qualified for HockeyAllsvenskan and Karlskrona promoted to HockeyAllsvenskan for the first time in the club's history, at the expense of Sundsvall. However, the SIHA did not grant Borås elite license for the 2012–13 season and Borås were therefore relegated to Division 1 while Asplöven, the 3rd-ranked team from the HockeyAllsvenskan Kvalserien, took over their spot for the next HockeyAllsvenskan season.

== See also ==
- List of ice hockey leagues in Sweden
