= 2014–15 Malmö Redhawks season =

Swedish ice hockey club season

2014–15 Malmö Redhawks
- League: Regular: 3rd Slutspelsserien: 3rd HockeyAllsvenskan
- 2014–15 record: 25–14–13
- Home record: 14–7–5
- Road record: 11–7–8
- Goals for: 168
- Goals against: 122

Team information
- General manager: Patrik Sylvegård
- Coach: Mats Lusth
- Assistant coach: Björn Hellkvist; Jesper Mattsson
- Captain: Henrik Hetta
- Alternate captains: Stefan Warg; David Liffiton
- Arena: Malmö Arena
- Average attendance: 6,258

Team leaders
- Goals: Frederik Storm (21)
- Assists: Jens Olsson (27)
- Points: Frederik Storm (43)
- Penalty minutes: David Liffiton (151)
- Wins: Jonas Gunnarsson (14)
- Goals against average: Pontus Sjögren (1.94)

The 2014–15 season was Malmö Redhawks's eight consecutive season in the HockeyAllsvenskan, the second-highest league in the Swedish ice hockey system. The regular season began on 11 September 2014 at home against IF Björklöven, and concluded on 28 February 2015 at home against AIK. The team finished in third place in the regular season and thus qualified for play in the 2015 Slutspelsserien. Malmö Redhawks finished in third place in Slutspelsserien and qualified for Direktkval till SHL against Leksands IF. The team won the series 4–3 after defeating Leksand in the final game of the series. Malmö Redhawks were therefore promoted to the SHL for the 2015–16 season.

== Standings ==
=== 2014–15 HockeyAllsvenskan season ===
Pos	Team	Pld	W	OTW	OTL	L	GF	GA	GD	Pts	Qualification or relegation
1	VIK Västerås	52	28	4	6	14	144	116	+28	98	Advance to the HockeyAllsvenskan finals
2	Karlskrona HK	52	26	8	2	16	159	124	+35	96	Advance to the HockeyAllsvenskan finals
3	Malmö Redhawks	52	25	7	6	14	168	122	+46	95	Advance to the playoffs
4	Rögle BK	52	22	6	7	17	158	140	+18	85	Advance to the playoffs
5	BIK Karlskoga	52	22	6	4	20	162	162	0	82	Advance to the playoffs

=== 2015 Slutspelsserien ===
Pos	Team	Pld	W	OTW	OTL	L	GF	GA	GD	Pts	Qualification
1	Rögle BK	5	2	3	0	0	19	11	+8	14	Advance to SHL qualifiers
2	HC Vita Hästen	5	3	1	1	0	14	9	+5	12	Advance to SHL qualifiers
3	Malmö Redhawks	5	1	1	0	3	8	13	−5	8	Advance to SHL qualifiers
4	IF Björklöven	5	1	2	0	2	10	9	+1	7	Return to HockeyAllsvenskan for the 2015–16 season
5	Mora IK	5	1	0	3	1	12	13	−1	6	Return to HockeyAllsvenskan for the 2015–16 season
6	BIK Karlskoga	5	0	0	3	2	10	18	−8	4	Return to HockeyAllsvenskan for the 2015–16 season

== Schedule and results ==
=== Preseason ===
2014 preseason game log: 2–1–3 (home: 0–0–0; road: 2–1–3)
#	Date	Home	Score	Visitor	OT	Decision	Attendance	Record	Recap
1	10 August	IK Pantern	1–2	Malmö Redhawks	OT	Sjögren	1,331	0–0–1
2	14 August	Växjö Lakers	2–3	Malmö Redhawks		Gunnarsson	3,514	1–0–1
3	30 August	AIK	2–4	Malmö Redhawks		Sjögren	544	2–0–1
4	31 August	Karlskrona HK	4–5	Malmö Redhawks	OT	Gunnarsson	702	2–0–2
5	2 September	Örebro HK	1–2	Malmö Redhawks	SO	Sjögren	2,187	2–0–3
6	3 September	IK Oskarshamn	3–1	Malmö Redhawks		Gunnarsson	604	2–1–3

=== Regular season ===
2014–15 Game Log: 25–14–13, 95 Points (home: 14–7–5; road: 11–7–8)

September: 2–2–4, 12 Points (home: 2–0–2; road: 0–2–2)
#	Date	Home	Score	Visitor	OT	Decision	Attendance	Record	Pts	Recap
1	11 September	Malmö Redhawks	6–1	IF Björklöven		Sjögren	7,225	1–0–0	3
2	13 September	HC Vita Hästen	2–1	Malmö Redhawks	OT	Sjögren	4,361	1–0–1	4
3	16 September	Malmö Redhawks	3–4	Södertälje SK	OT	Sjögren	4,162	1–0–2	5
4	18 September	Asplöven HC	3–2	Malmö Redhawks		Gunnarsson	1,097	1–1–2	5
5	20 September	Malmö Redhawks	4–1	Almtuna IS		Gunnarsson	4,448	2–1–2	8
6	24 September	IK Oskarshamn	3–4	Malmö Redhawks	OT	Gunnarsson	1,930	2–1–3	10
7	26 September	Malmö Redhawks	2–1	Timrå IK	SO	Sjögren	5,417	2–1–4	12
8	30 September	Rögle BK	3–2	Malmö Redhawks		Sjögren	4,326	2–2–4	12

October: 6–3–3, 22 Points (home: 3–3–1; road: 3–0–2)
#	Date	Home	Score	Visitor	OT	Decision	Attendance	Record	Pts	Recap
9	2 October	Malmö Redhawks	2–3	Mora IK		Gunnarsson	4,691	2–3–4	12
10	4 October	Karlskrona HK	0–3	Malmö Redhawks		Sjögren	2,978	3–3–4	15
11	8 October	Malmö Redhawks	3–2	VIK Västerås HK	OT	Sjögren	4,546	3–3–5	17
12	10 October	Malmö Redhawks	6–2	BIK Karlskoga		Sjögren	5,240	4–3–5	20
13	14 October	AIK	3–2	Malmö Redhawks	OT	Sjögren	3,176	4–3–6	21
14	16 October	IF Björklöven	0–3	Malmö Redhawks		Sjögren	3,312	5–3–6	24
15	18 October	Malmö Redhawks	0–2	HC Vita Hästen		Sjögren	5,636	5–4–6	24
21	21 October	Malmö Redhawks	3–1	Rögle BK		Sjögren	8,195	6–4–6	27
16	23 October	Södertälje SK	4–6	Malmö Redhawks		Sjögren	2,953	7–4–6	30
17	26 October	Malmö Redhawks	4–1	Asplöven HC		Gunnarsson	5,314	8–4–6	33
18	28 October	Almtuna IS	3–2	Malmö Redhawks	SO	Gunnarsson	1,834	8–4–7	34
19	30 October	Malmö Redhawks	0–3	IK Oskarshamn		Sjögren	4,858	8–5–7	34

November: 3–3–1, 11 Points (home: 2–1–0; road: 1–2–1)
#	Date	Home	Score	Visitor	OT	Decision	Attendance	Record	Pts	Recap
20	1 November	Timrå IK	3–1	Malmö Redhawks		Sjögren	2,788	8–6–7	34
22	12 November	Malmö Redhawks	5–2	Mora IK		Gunnarsson	5,249	9–6–7	37
23	15 November	Malmö Redhawks	4–2	Karlskrona HK		Gunnarsson	6,459	10–6–7	40
24	20 November	VIK Västerås HK	1–2	Malmö Redhawks	SO	Gunnarsson	3,534	10–6–8	42
25	22 November	BIK Karlskoga	3–1	Malmö Redhawks		Gunnarsson	2,135	10–7–8	42
26	25 November	Malmö Redhawks	2–3	AIK		Gunnarsson	5,779	10–8–8	42
28	29 November	HC Vita Hästen	3–6	Malmö Redhawks		Sjögren	3,763	11–8–8	45

December: 7–0–2, 24 Points (home: 4–0–0; road: 3–0–2)
#	Date	Home	Score	Visitor	OT	Decision	Attendance	Record	Pts	Recap
27	1 December	Malmö Redhawks	4–2	IF Björklöven		Sjögren	4,633	12–8–8	48
29	3 December	Malmö Redhawks	4–3	Södertälje SK		Gunnarsson	6,073	13–8–8	51
30	5 December	Asplöven HC	1–2	Malmö Redhawks		Gunnarsson	1,242	14–8–8	54
31	9 December	Malmö Redhawks	8–1	Almtuna IS		Gunnarsson	4,789	15–8–8	57
32	11 December	IK Oskarshamn	5–4	Malmö Redhawks	OT	Gunnarsson	1,880	15–8–9	58
33	13 December	Malmö Redhawks	4–2	Timrå IK		Gunnarsson	5,499	16–8–9	61
34	16 December	Rögle BK	3–4	Malmö Redhawks	SO	Gunnarsson	4,742	16–8–10	63
35	27 December	Mora IK	1–2	Malmö Redhawks		Gunnarsson	4,210	17–8–10	66
36	29 December	Karlskrona HK	1–3	Malmö Redhawks		Gunnarsson	3,400	18–8–10	69

January: 3–3–2, 12 Points (home: 1–2–1; road: 2–1–1)
#	Date	Home	Score	Visitor	OT	Decision	Attendance	Record	Pts	Recap
37	3 January	Malmö Redhawks	2–3	VIK Västerås HK		Gunnarsson	8,272	18–9–10	69
38	6 January	Malmö Redhawks	3–5	BIK Karlskoga		Gunnarsson	6,611	18–10–10	69
39	10 January	AIK	1–2	Malmö Redhawks		Sjögren	3,840	19–10–10	72
40	15 January	IF Björklöven	6–3	Malmö Redhawks		Sjögren	3,173	19–11–10	72
41	20 January	Malmö Redhawks	9–1	HC Vita Hästen		Gunnarsson	5,293	20–11–10	75
42	24 January	Södertälje SK	2–3	Malmö Redhawks		Gunnarsson	2,709	21–11–10	78
43	27 January	Malmö Redhawks	2–3	Asplöven HC	SO	Gunnarsson	5,416	21–11–11	79
44	30 January	Almtuna IS	2–3	Malmö Redhawks	OT	Hovinen	1,345	21–11–12	81

February: 4–3–1, 14 Points (home: 2–1–1; road: 2–2–0)
#	Date	Home	Score	Visitor	OT	Decision	Attendance	Record	Pts	Recap
45	3 February	Malmö Redhawks	3–2	IK Oskarshamn	SO	Hovinen	5,599	21–11–13	83
46	12 February	Timrå IK	5–3	Malmö Redhawks		Hovinen	5,680	21–12–13	83
47	16 February	Malmö Redhawks	2–1	Rögle BK		Hovinen	12,817	22–12–13	86
48	19 February	Mora IK	1–7	Malmö Redhawks		Hovinen	2,308	23–12–13	89
49	21 February	Malmö Redhawks	3–5	Karlskrona HK		Hovinen	12,800	23–13–13	89
50	24 February	VIK Västerås HK	3–2	Malmö Redhawks		Hovinen	4,902	23–14–13	89
51	26 February	BIK Karlskoga	3–4	Malmö Redhawks		Hovinen	2,352	24–14–13	92
52	28 February	Malmö Redhawks	3–1	AIK		Hovinen	7,677	25–14–13	95

Legend: Win (3 points) Overtime/Shootout win (2 points) Loss (0 points) Overtime/Shootout loss (1 point)

=== 2015 Slutspelsserien ===
Malmö Redhawks qualified to the 2015 Slutspelsserien by finishing in third place in the regular season. By merit of their ranking they were given three bonus points ahead of the start of the series. The series started on 5 March 2015 and concluded on 13 March 2015. Malmö Redhawks finished 3rd in the series and qualified to play in the Direktkval till SHL against Leksands IF.

2015 Slutspelsserien Game Log: 1–3–1, 8 Points (home: 1–2–0; road: 0–1–1)
#	Date	Home	Score	Visitor	OT	Decision	Attendance	Record	Pts	Recap
1	5 March	Malmö Redhawks	2–5	Rögle BK		Hovinen	8,253	0–1–0	3
2	7 March	HC Vita Hästen	3–1	Malmö Redhawks		Hovinen	4,229	0–2–0	3
3	9 March	Malmö Redhawks	0–2	IF Björklöven		Hovinen	4,829	0–3–0	3
4	11 March	BIK Karlskoga	2–3	Malmö Redhawks	SO	Hovinen	2,115	0–3–1	5
5	13 March	Malmö Redhawks	2–1	Mora IK		Hovinen	5,314	1–3–1	8

Legend: Win (3 points) Overtime/Shootout win (2 points) Loss (0 points) Overtime/Shootout loss (1 point)

=== 2015 Direktkval till SHL ===
Malmö Redhawks qualified to the 2015 Direktkval till SHL by finishing in third place in Slutspelsserien. They faced Leksands IF from SHL who finished 11th in the 2014–15 SHL season. Leksand had home advantage in games 1, 3, 5 and 7 at Tegera Arena. Malmö Redhawks won the series 4–3 and qualified to play in the 2015–16 SHL season, their first season back in the first level of Swedish hockey since the 2006–07 season and the first since the league's renaming to SHL.

2015 Direktkval till SHL vs. Leksands IF – Malmö Redhawks won series 4–3
#	Date	Home	Score	Visitor	OT	Decision	Attendance	Series	Recap
1	15 March	Leksands IF	3–4	Malmö Redhawks		Hovinen	5,977	1–0
2	18 March	Malmö Redhawks	2–3	Leksands IF	13:41 OT	Hovinen	8,837	1–1
3	21 March	Leksands IF	4–3	Malmö Redhawks		Hovinen	7,602	1–2
4	24 March	Malmö Redhawks	3–1	Leksands IF		Hovinen	8,562	2–2
5	27 March	Leksands IF	2–1	Malmö Redhawks		Hovinen	6,575	2–3
6	30 March	Malmö Redhawks	6–3	Leksands IF		Hovinen	12,574	3–3
7	2 April	Leksands IF	2–4	Malmö Redhawks		Hovinen	7,650	4–3

Legend: Win Overtime win Loss Overtime loss

== Player stats ==
Updated as of end of season

=== Skaters ===
Note: GP = Games played; G = Goals; A = Assists; Pts = Points; +/- = Plus–minus; PIM = Penalty minutes

Regular season

Player	GP	G	A	Pts	+/-	PIM
Frederik Storm	50	21	22	43	8	16
Joey Tenute	39	12	23	35	7	30
Jens Olsson	52	7	27	34	6	34
Jens Jakobs	52	14	18	32	17	4
Nils Andersson	52	13	18	31	10	14
Mattias Persson	46	7	23	30	5	22
Henrik Hetta	51	12	14	26	22	32
Björn Svensson	44	16	9	25	13	10
Tobias Ericsson	41	3	17	20	12	12
Nicklas Jadeland	52	12	7	19	9	52
Mathias Tjärnqvist^{†}	39	10	5	15	–3	8
Eric Himelfarb^{†}	12	3	12	15	1	8
Tony Romano	44	9	5	14	–4	20
Magnus Häggström	52	5	9	14	6	28
David Liffiton	51	2	10	12	9	151
Stefan Warg	51	2	8	10	10	38
Colin Stuart^{‡}	31	5	4	9	4	10
Fabian Brunnström	8	2	6	8	1	4
Yanick Lehoux^{†‡}	15	4	3	7	–3	16
Sebastian Strandberg^{†‡}	24	2	3	5	12	8
Jeremias Augustin	51	1	3	4	13	37
Anton Lindholm^{†‡}	5	1	2	3	0	2
Nils Bergström	36	1	2	3	–4	16
Christoffer Forsberg^{†}	8	0	3	3	–5	0
Joachim Rohdin^{†‡}	2	2	0	2	–1	0
Johan Ivarsson	38	1	1	2	3	14
Niklas Arell^{†‡}	10	0	2	2	2	2
Jon Knuts^{‡}	7	1	0	1	0	2
Patrik Blomberg^{†‡}	12	0	1	1	–1	0
Jonas Gunnarsson^{(G)}	52	0	1	1	—	2
Ludvig Jardeskog^{†‡}	2	0	0	0	0	0
Andreas Ljunggren^{(G)†‡}	3	0	0	0	—	0
Damien Riat^{†‡}	3	0	0	0	0	0
Kim Johansson^{†‡}	3	0	0	0	0	2
Jesper Williamsson^{†‡}	4	0	0	0	–4	4
Robin Dahse^{†‡}	7	0	0	0	1	2
Niko Hovinen^{(G)†}	9	0	0	0	—	0
Kim Rosdahl	9	0	0	0	0	0
Jens Henrik Tönjum	13	0	0	0	–1	4
Johan Björk^{†}	13	0	0	0	–4	8
Pontus Sjögren^{(G)}	40	0	0	0	—	4
Team Totals		168	258	426	141	664

2015 Slutspelsserien

Player	GP	G	A	Pts	+/-	PIM
Tony Romano	4	1	1	2	1	2
Frederik Storm	5	1	1	2	–6	0
Nils Andersson	5	1	1	2	–1	2
Fabian Brunnström	5	1	1	2	–5	4
Mattias Persson	5	0	2	2	–2	0
Eric Himelfarb^{†}	4	1	0	1	–1	4
Tobias Ericsson	5	1	0	1	–5	0
Björn Svensson	5	1	0	1	–2	2
Mathias Tjärnqvist^{†}	5	1	0	1	–1	4
Henrik Hetta	5	0	1	1	–3	0
Jens Jakobs	5	0	1	1	–1	2
Nicklas Jadeland	5	0	1	1	–2	4
Johan Ivarsson	2	0	0	0	–1	0
Mads Larsen^{†‡}	2	0	0	0	0	0
Jeremias Augustin	3	0	0	0	1	0
Johan Björk^{†}	4	0	0	0	–2	0
Christoffer Forsberg^{†}	4	0	0	0	–2	0
Jens Olsson	4	0	0	0	–1	0
Jens Henrik Tönjum	4	0	0	0	–1	0
Kim Rosdahl	4	0	0	0	0	2
Niko Hovinen^{(G)†}	5	0	0	0	—	0
Jonas Gunnarsson^{(G)}	5	0	0	0	—	0
Magnus Häggström	5	0	0	0	–2	0
Stefan Warg	5	0	0	0	–5	0
David Liffiton	5	0	0	0	–2	6
Team Totals		8	9	17	–43	32

2015 Direktkval till SHL

Player	GP	G	A	Pts	+/-	PIM
Jens Jakobs	7	2	5	7	3	0
Jens Olsson	7	0	7	7	0	2
Nils Andersson	6	4	2	6	4	6
Eric Himelfarb^{†}	7	4	1	5	–1	6
Mattias Persson	7	1	4	5	4	4
Christoffer Forsberg^{†}	7	2	2	4	5	2
Henrik Hetta	7	1	3	4	2	0
Johan Björk^{†}	6	0	4	4	5	2
Nicklas Jadeland	7	2	1	3	3	2
Mathias Tjärnqvist^{†}	7	2	1	3	–2	4
Fabian Brunnström	7	0	3	3	–1	0
Björn Svensson	7	2	0	2	3	2
Jeremias Augustin	7	1	1	2	1	2
Magnus Häggström	7	1	1	2	0	8
Tobias Ericsson	5	0	2	2	3	2
Frederik Storm	7	0	2	2	1	0
Jens Henrik Tönjum	3	1	0	1	2	0
Mads Larsen^{†‡}	2	0	0	0	0	0
David Liffiton	2	0	0	0	0	0
Tony Romano	5	0	0	0	–1	0
Kim Rosdahl	6	0	0	0	0	0
Niko Hovinen^{(G)†}	7	0	0	0	—	0
Jonas Gunnarsson^{(G)}	7	0	0	0	—	0
Johan Ivarsson	7	0	0	0	–3	2
Stefan Warg	7	0	0	0	2	4
Team Totals		23	39	62	30	58

- ^{†}Denotes player spent time with another team before joining Malmö Redhawks. Stats reflect time with the Redhawks only.
- ^{‡}Denotes player was traded mid-season. Stats reflect time with the Redhawks only.
- ^{(G)}Denotes goaltender.
- Team PIM totals include bench infractions.

=== Goaltenders ===
Note: GPI = Games played in; MIN = Minutes played; GAA = Goals against average; W = Wins; L = Losses; SO = Shutouts; SA = Shots against; GA = Goals against; SV% = Save percentage

Regular season

Player	GPI	MIN	GAA	W	L	SO	SA	GA	SV%
Jonas Gunnarsson	25	1424	2.28	14	9	0	522	54	.896
Pontus Sjögren	21	1174	1.94	12	8	2	337	38	.887
Niko Hovinen	9	543	2.32	6	3	0	251	21	.916
Combined		3141	2.31	32	20	2	1110	113	.891

2015 Slutspelsserien

Player	GPI	MIN	GAA	W	L	SO	SA	GA	SV%
Niko Hovinen	5	301	2.19	2	3	0	125	11	.912
Combined		301	2.19	2	3	0	125	11	.912

2015 Direktkval till SHL

Player	GPI	MIN	GAA	W	L	SO	SA	GA	SV%
Niko Hovinen	7	431	2.50	4	3	0	215	18	.916
Combined		431	2.50	4	3	0	215	18	.916

== Final roster ==
No.	Nat	Player	Pos	S/G	Age	Acquired	Birthplace
2	(Sweden)	Nils Andersson	D	R	34	2014	Umeå, Sweden
22	(Sweden)	Jeremias Augustin	D	L	40	2014	Växjö, Sweden
4	(Sweden)	Nils Bergström	C	L	41	2014	Östersund, Sweden
55	(Sweden)	Johan Björk	D	L	41	2015	Malmö, Sweden
54	(Sweden)	Fabian Brunnström	LW	L	41	2015	Jonstorp, Sweden
7	(Sweden)	Tobias Ericsson	D	L	38	2013	Stockholm, Sweden
23	(Sweden)	Christoffer Forsberg	C/LW	L	31	2015	Östersund, Sweden
37	(Sweden)	Jonas Gunnarsson	G	L	33	2014	Eksjö, Sweden
20	(Sweden)	Henrik Hetta (C)	LW	L	36	2012	Strömsund, Sweden
39	(Canada)	Eric Himelfarb	C	R	43	2015	Thornhill, Ontario, Canada
33	(Finland)	Niko Hovinen	G	L	38	2015	Helsinki, Finland
16	(Sweden)	Magnus Häggström	C/RW	R	39	2012	Örnsköldsvik, Sweden
57	(Sweden)	Johan Ivarsson	D	L	30	2014	Sweden
61	(Sweden)	Nicklas Jadeland	W	L	39	2012	Malmö, Sweden
62	(Sweden)	Jens Jakobs	RW	R	41	2014	Säter, Sweden
3	(Sweden)	Björn Karlsson	D	L	37	2013	Rävemåla, Sweden
36	(Canada)	David Liffiton (A)	D	L	41	2013	Windsor, Ontario, Canada
28	(Sweden)	Jens Olsson	D	L	41	2012	Malmö, Sweden
90	(Sweden)	Mattias Persson	W	L	40	2012	Bohus-Malmön, Sweden
8	(United States)	Tony Romano	RW/C	R	38	2014	Smithtown, New York, United States
96	(Sweden)	Kim Rosdahl	LW	R	29	2013	Malmö, Sweden
40	(Sweden)	Pontus Sjögren	G	L	40	2011	Stockholm, Sweden
9	(Denmark)	Frederik Storm	W	L	37	2012	Gentofte, Denmark
91	(Sweden)	Björn Svensson	W	L	39	2013	Ljungby, Sweden
11	(Canada)	Joey Tenute	C	L	42	2013	Hamilton, Ontario, Canada
17	(Sweden)	Mathias Tjärnqvist	LW	L	46	2014	Umeå, Sweden
3	(Norway)	Jens Henrik Tönjum	LW	L	30	2014	Mölndal, Sweden
69	(Sweden)	Stefan Warg (A)	D	R	36	2014	Stockholm, Sweden
