= 2015–16 Malmö Redhawks season =

Malmö Redhawks during the 2015–2016 ice hockey season

2015–16 Malmö Redhawks
- League: 12th SHL
- 2015–16 record: 15–26–11
- Home record: 9–12–5
- Road record: 6–14–6
- Goals for: 116
- Goals against: 153

Team information
- General manager: Patrik Sylvegård
- Coach: Björn Hellkvist
- Assistant coach: Andreas Hadelöv; Jesper Mattsson
- Captain: Henrik Hetta
- Alternate captains: Nils Andersson; Magnus Häggström
- Arena: Malmö Arena
- Average attendance: 7,725

Team leaders
- Goals: Andreas Thuresson; Björn Svensson (14)
- Assists: Nils Andersson (24)
- Points: Nils Andersson (30)
- Penalty minutes: Kim Rosdahl (58)
- Wins: Jonas Gunnarsson (18)
- Goals against average: Jonas Gunnarsson (2.47)

The 2015–16 season was Malmö Redhawks's first season back in the SHL, the premier league in Swedish ice hockey, since the 2006–07 season and the first time since the league was renamed. The regular season began on 17 September 2015 away against Brynäs IF, and concluded on 8 March 2016 away against Linköping HC. The team finished in 12th place and therefore failed to qualify for the play-offs.

== Standings ==
=== 2015–16 SHL season ===
Pos	Team	Pld	W	OTW	OTL	L	GF	GA	GD	Pts	Qualification
1	Skellefteå AIK	52	33	4	4	11	160	103	+57	111	Qualification to Quarter-finals
2	Frölunda HC	52	30	7	0	15	169	112	+57	104	Qualification to Quarter-finals
3	Linköpings HC	52	23	9	7	13	163	121	+42	94	Qualification to Quarter-finals
4	Luleå HF	52	26	5	4	17	140	123	+17	92	Qualification to Quarter-finals
5	Färjestad BK	52	20	10	9	13	141	130	+11	89	Qualification to Quarter-finals
6	Växjö Lakers	52	25	4	4	19	147	139	+8	87	Qualification to Quarter-finals
7	Djurgårdens IF	52	23	5	7	17	144	135	+9	86	Qualification to Round of 16
8	Örebro HK	52	19	6	8	19	135	146	−11	77	Qualification to Round of 16
9	HV71	52	21	4	4	23	138	146	−8	75	Qualification to Round of 16
10	Brynäs IF	52	21	4	3	24	133	138	−5	74	Qualification to Round of 16
11	Rögle BK	52	16	4	6	26	125	154	−29	62	
12	Malmö Redhawks	52	15	5	6	26	116	153	−37	61	
13	Modo Hockey	52	13	3	4	32	119	166	−47	49	Qualification to Relegation playoffs
14	Karlskrona HK	52	5	4	8	35	120	184	−64	31	Qualification to Relegation playoffs

Source: Swedish Hockey League
Rules for classification: 1) Points; 2) Goal difference; 3) Number of goals scored

== Schedule and results ==
=== Pre-season ===
2015 preseason game log: 6–3–0 (home: 1–1–0; road: 5–2–0)
#	Date	Home	Score	Visitor	OT	Decision	Attendance	Record	Recap
1	11 August	IK Pantern	0–4	Malmö Redhawks		Sjögren	2,294	1–0–0
2	13 August	Malmö Redhawks	3–0	Växjö Lakers		Alsenfelt	1,740	2–0–0
3	20 August	Malmö Redhawks	3–7	Hamburg Freezers		Sjögren	913	2–1–0
4	26 August	HC Lugano	0–2	Malmö Redhawks		Alsenfelt	300	3–1–0
5	27 August	SCL Tigers	3–5	Malmö Redhawks		Sjögren	—	4–1–0
6	28 August	Kölner Haie	6–1	Malmö Redhawks		Alsenfelt	—	4–2–0
7	30 August	HV71	1–4	Malmö Redhawks		Alsenfelt	—	5–2–0
8	2 September	Karlskrona HK	4–0	Malmö Redhawks		Gunnarsson	1,364	5–3–0
9	10 September	Djurgårdens IF	3–4	Malmö Redhawks		Alsenfelt	584	6–3–0

=== Regular season ===
2015–16 Game Log: 15–26–11, 61 Points (home: 9–12–5; road: 6–14–6)

September: 1–2–1, 4 Points (home: 1–0–1; road: 0–2–0)
#	Date	Home	Score	Visitor	OT	Decision	Attendance	Record	Pts	Recap
1	17 September	Brynäs IF	6–3	Malmö Redhawks		Alsenfelt	5,898	0–1–0	0
2	19 September	Malmö Redhawks	4–0	Örebro HK		Alsenfelt	8,816	1–1–0	3
3	24 September	Malmö Redhawks	4–5	Frölunda HC	SO	Alsenfelt	7,378	1–1–1	4
4	26 September	Växjö Lakers	4–3	Malmö Redhawks		Alsenfelt	4,665	1–2–1	4

October: 3–8–1, 10 Points (home: 1–4–1; road: 2–4–0)
#	Date	Home	Score	Visitor	OT	Decision	Attendance	Record	Pts	Recap
5	1 October	Malmö Redhawks	2–3	Färjestad BK		Alsenfelt	7,125	1–3–1	4
6	3 October	Djurgårdens IF	3–0	Malmö Redhawks		Gunnarsson	6,581	1–4–1	4
7	8 October	Malmö Redhawks	1–7	Linköpings HC		Gunnarsson	6,332	1–5–1	4
8	10 October	Karlskrona HK	4–7	Malmö Redhawks		Gunnarsson	3,244	2–5–1	7
9	13 October	Malmö Redhawks	2–3	Luleå HF	SO	Gunnarsson	6,357	2–5–2	8
10	17 October	Malmö Redhawks	1–0	Modo Hockey		Gunnarsson	7,197	3–5–2	11
11	20 October	Rögle BK	3–2	Malmö Redhawks		Gunnarsson	5,051	3–6–2	11
12	23 October	HV71	6–2	Malmö Redhawks		Noronen	6,502	3–7–2	11
13	24 October	Malmö Redhawks	1–4	HV71		Gunnarsson	8,814	3–8–2	11
14	28 October	Örebro HK	1–3	Malmö Redhawks		Gunnarsson	5,449	4–8–2	14
15	30 October	Malmö Redhawks	3–4	Skellefteå AIK		Gunnarsson	7,362	4–9–2	14
16	31 October	Skellefteå AIK	2–0	Malmö Redhawks		Gunnarsson	5,257	4–10–2	14

November: 3–3–1, 11 Points (home: 2–3–0; road: 1–0–1)
#	Date	Home	Score	Visitor	OT	Decision	Attendance	Record	Pts	Recap
17	12 November	Malmö Redhawks	5–1	Luleå HF		Gunnarsson	6,754	5–10–2	17
18	14 November	Malmö Redhawks	0–3	Brynäs IF		Gunnarsson	8,478	5–11–2	17
19	19 November	Linköpings HC	2–3	Malmö Redhawks	SO	Gunnarsson	5,737	5–11–3	19
20	22 November	Malmö Redhawks	2–7	Växjö Lakers		Gunnarsson	7,010	5–12–3	19
21	24 November	Karlskrona HK	0–3	Malmö Redhawks		Gunnarsson	2,774	6–12–3	22
22	26 November	Malmö Redhawks	3–1	Rögle BK		Gunnarsson	12,600	7–12–3	25
23	29 November	Malmö Redhawks	1–4	Djurgårdens IF		Gunnarsson	6,341	7–13–3	25

December: 2–3–2, 9 Points (home: 1–1–1; road: 1–2–1)
#	Date	Home	Score	Visitor	OT	Decision	Attendance	Record	Pts	Recap
24	3 December	Färjestad BK	4–2	Malmö Redhawks		Gunnarsson	4,345	7–14–3	25
26	10 December	Malmö Redhawks	3–2	Modo Hockey		Gunnarsson	6,814	8–14–3	28
27	12 December	Modo Hockey	2–5	Malmö Redhawks		Gunnarsson	4,908	9–14–3	31
25	22 December	Malmö Redhawks	0–3	Frölunda HC		Gunnarsson	8,524	9–15–3	31
28	26 December	HV71	2–1	Malmö Redhawks		Gunnarsson	6,782	9–16–3	31
29	28 December	Malmö Redhawks	2–1	Karlskrona HK	SO	Gunnarsson	8,855	9–16–4	33
30	30 December	Frölunda HC	3–2	Malmö Redhawks	SO	Gunnarsson	12,044	9–16–5	34

January: 1–5–3, 8 Points (home: 0–2–1; road: 1–3–2)
#	Date	Home	Score	Visitor	OT	Decision	Attendance	Record	Pts	Recap
31	7 January	Örebro HK	1–2	Malmö Redhawks	OT	Gunnarsson	5,382	9–16–6	36
32	9 January	Brynäs IF	3–2	Malmö Redhawks		Gunnarsson	5,257	9–17–6	36
33	14 January	Växjö Lakers	1–5	Malmö Redhawks		Alsenfelt	4,445	10–17–6	39
34	16 January	Luleå HF	3–1	Malmö Redhawks		Gunnarsson	4,874	10–18–6	39
35	22 January	Malmö Redhawks	0–3	Djurgårdens IF		Gunnarsson	8,126	10–19–6	39
36	23 January	Djurgårdens IF	5–2	Malmö Redhawks		Sjögren	6,713	10–20–6	39
37	26 January	Malmö Redhawks	1–4	Linköpings HC		Gunnarsson	5,854	10–21–6	39
38	28 January	Malmö Redhawks	2–3	Färjestad BK	SO	Gunnarsson	6,609	10–21–7	40
39	30 January	Skellefteå AIK	1–2	Malmö Redhawks	OT	Gunnarsson	4,740	10–21–8	42

February: 4–3–2, 15 Points (home: 3–2–0; road: 1–1–2)
#	Date	Home	Score	Visitor	OT	Decision	Attendance	Record	Pts	Recap
40	2 February	Malmö Redhawks	0–4	Örebro HK		Gunnarsson	5,723	10–22–8	42
41	4 February	Malmö Redhawks	0–3	Skellefteå AIK		Gunnarsson	6,403	10–23–8	42
42	6 February	Modo Hockey	2–1	Malmö Redhawks	OT	Gunnarsson	5,325	10–23–9	43
43	16 February	Luleå HF	2–3	Malmö Redhawks	OT	Gunnarsson	4,873	10–23–10	45
44	18 February	Malmö Redhawks	3–1	Växjö Lakers		Gunnarsson	6,908	11–23–10	48
45	20 February	Färjestad BK	3–5	Malmö Redhawks		Gunnarsson	7,548	12–23–10	51
46	23 February	Malmö Redhawks	5–3	HV71		Gunnarsson	7,063	13–23–10	54
47	25 February	Frölunda HC	4–1	Malmö Redhawks		Gunnarsson	8,408	13–24–10	54
48	27 February	Malmö Redhawks	3–1	Karlskrona HK		Gunnarsson	9,369	14–24–10	57

March: 1–2–1, 4 Points (home: 1–0–1; road: 0–2–0)
#	Date	Home	Score	Visitor	OT	Decision	Attendance	Record	Pts	Recap
49	2 March	Malmö Redhawks	5–3	Brynäs IF		Gunnarsson	7,446	15–24–10	60
50	4 March	Rögle BK	5–1	Malmö Redhawks		Gunnarsson	5,051	15–25–10	60
51	5 March	Malmö Redhawks	2–3	Rögle BK	SO	Sjögren	12,600	15–25–11	61
52	8 March	Linköpings HC	5–0	Malmö Redhawks		Gunnarsson	5,292	15–26–11	61

Legend: Win (3 points) Overtime/Shootout win (2 points) Loss (0 points) Overtime/Shootout loss (1 point)

== Roster ==
Updated on 21 October 2015.

No.	Nat	Player	Pos	S/G	Age	Acquired	Birthplace
69	(Sweden)	Oscar Alsenfelt	G	L	38	2015	Malmö, Sweden
2	(Sweden)	Erik Andersson	D	L	43	2015	Umeå, Sweden
7	(Sweden)	Nils Andersson (A)	D	R	34	2014	Umeå, Sweden
22	(Sweden)	Jeremias Augustin	D	L	40	2014	Växjö, Sweden
55	(Sweden)	Johan Björk	D	L	41	2015	Malmö, Sweden
23	(Sweden)	Christoffer Forsberg	C/LW	L	31	2015	Östersund, Sweden
72	(United States)	TJ Galiardi	C	L	37	2015	Calgary, Alberta, Canada
37	(Sweden)	Jonas Gunnarsson	G	L	33	2014	Eksjö, Sweden
20	(Sweden)	Henrik Hetta (C)	LW	L	36	2012	Strömsund, Sweden
39	(Canada)	Eric Himelfarb	C	R	43	2015	Thornhill, Ontario, Canada
16	(Sweden)	Magnus Häggström (A)	C/RW	R	39	2012	Örnsköldsvik, Sweden
57	(Sweden)	Johan Ivarsson	D	L	30	2014	Sweden
61	(Sweden)	Nicklas Jadeland	W	L	39	2012	Malmö, Sweden
62	(Sweden)	Jens Jakobs	RW	R	40	2014	Säter, Sweden
3	(Canada)	Kent McDonell	RW	R	46	2015	Williamstown, Ontario, Canada
14	(Canada)	Derek Meech	D	L	41	2015	Winnipeg, Manitoba, Canada
88	(United States)	Peter Mueller	W	R	37	2015	Bloomington, Minnesota, United States
31	(Finland)	Mika Noronen	G	L	46	2015	Tampere, Finland
28	(Sweden)	Jens Olsson	D	L	41	2012	Malmö, Sweden
90	(Sweden)	Mattias Persson	W	L	40	2012	Bohus-Malmön, Sweden
96	(Sweden)	Kim Rosdahl	LW	R	29	2013	Malmö, Sweden
40	(Sweden)	Pontus Sjögren	G	L	40	2011	Stockholm, Sweden
9	(Denmark)	Frederik Storm	W	L	36	2012	Gentofte, Denmark
91	(Sweden)	Björn Svensson	W	L	39	2013	Ljungby, Sweden
11	(Canada)	Joey Tenute	C	L	42	2013	Hamilton, Ontario, Canada
12	(Sweden)	Andreas Thuresson	C/LW	R	38	2015	Kristianstad, Sweden
6	(Sweden)	Stefan Warg	D	R	36	2014	Stockholm, Sweden
