= Nils Bergström =

Nils Bergström may refer to:

- Nils Bergström (athlete) (1898–1988), Swedish long-distance runner
- Nils Bergström (ice hockey) (born 1985), Swedish ice hockey player
- Nils Bergström (bandy), Swedish bandy and football player
