= Rosdahl =

Rosdahl is a surname. Notable people with the surname include:

- Hatch Rosdahl (1941–2004), American football player
- Kim Rosdahl (born 1996), Swedish ice hockey player
