= Johan Ivarsson =

Johan Ivarsson may refer to:

- Johan Ivarsson (orienteer), born 1967
- Johan Ivarsson (ice hockey), born 1995
