= Hallikainen =

Hallikainen is a Finnish surname. Notable people with the surname include:

- Joel Hallikainen (born 1961), Finnish musician and entertainer
- Joonas Hallikainen (born 1985), Finnish ice hockey player
