= Jens Olsson =

Jens Olsson may refer to:

- Jens Olsson (ice hockey) (born 1984), Swedish ice hockey defenceman
- Jens Olsson (badminton) (born 1964), Swedish badminton player
