= Magnus Pääjärvi =

Swedish ice hockey player (born 1991)

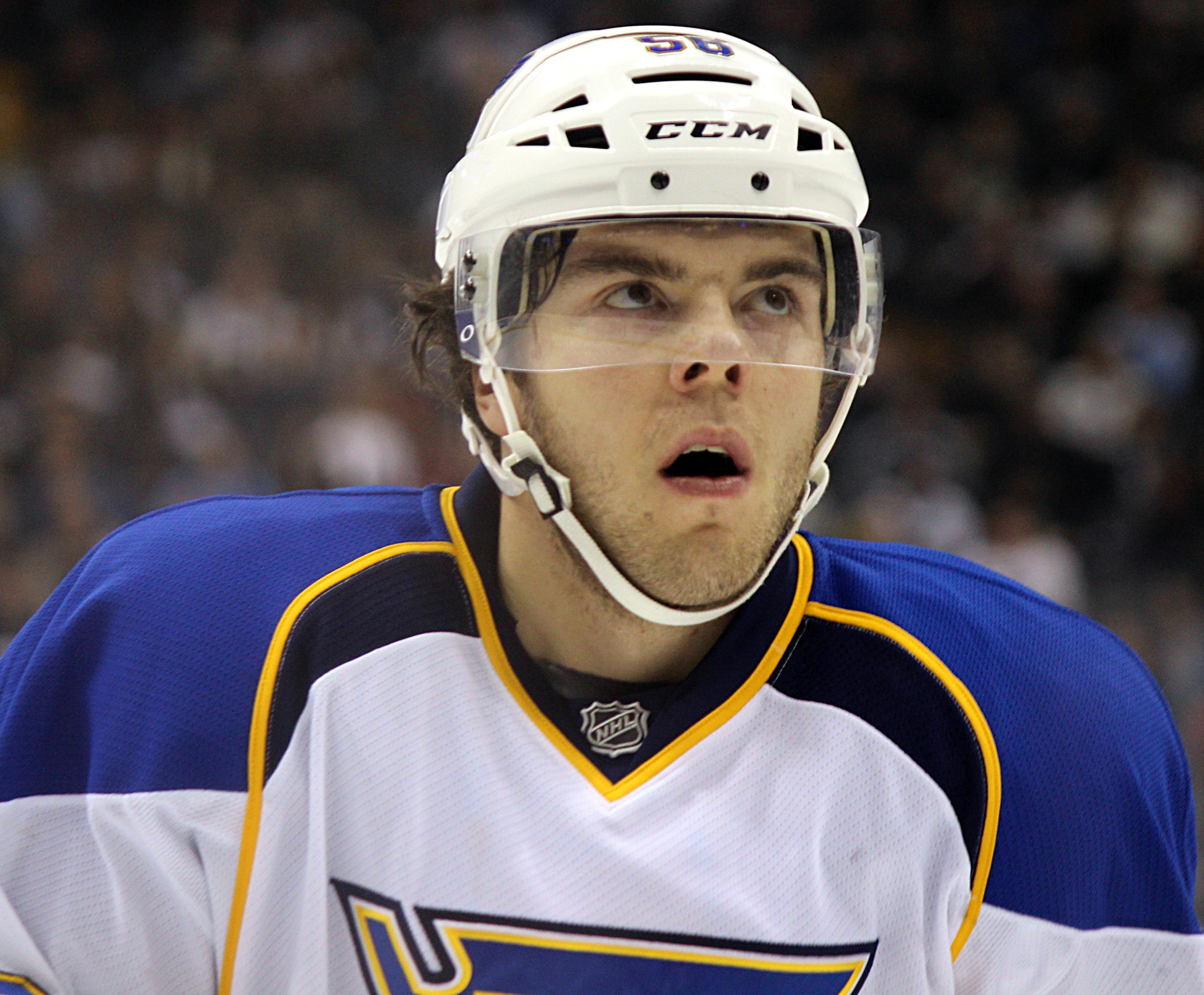
- Pääjärvi with the St. Louis Blues in 2014
- Born: 12 April 1991 (age 35) Norrköping, Sweden
- Height: 191 cm (6 ft 3 in)
- Weight: 94 kg (207 lb; 14 st 11 lb)
- Position: Left wing
- Shoots: Left
- SHL team Former teams: Timrå IK; Edmonton Oilers; St. Louis Blues; Ottawa Senators; Lokomotiv Yaroslavl; Dynamo Moscow; Malmö Redhawks
- National team: Sweden
- NHL draft: 10th overall, 2009; Edmonton Oilers
- Playing career: 2007–present

Karl Magnus Svensson Pääjärvi (born 12 April 1991), surname also known as Pääjärvi-Svensson, is a Swedish professional ice hockey left winger, currently playing for Timrå IK of the Swedish Hockey League (SHL). During his NHL career, Pääjärvi played for the Edmonton Oilers, St. Louis Blues and Ottawa Senators. He was drafted 10th overall in the 2009 NHL entry draft by the Edmonton Oilers.

== Early life ==
Pääjärvi is the son of former ice hockey player and coach Gunnar Svensson and Ingrid Maria Svensson-Pääjärvi, and the younger brother of Björn Svensson. Magnus Pääjärvi was born in Sweden while his father Gunnar was the coach and manager of IK Vita Hästen. Magnus uses the surname, formerly a hyphenated surname, in honour of his maternal grandfather, who was Finnish.

== Playing career ==
=== SHL ===
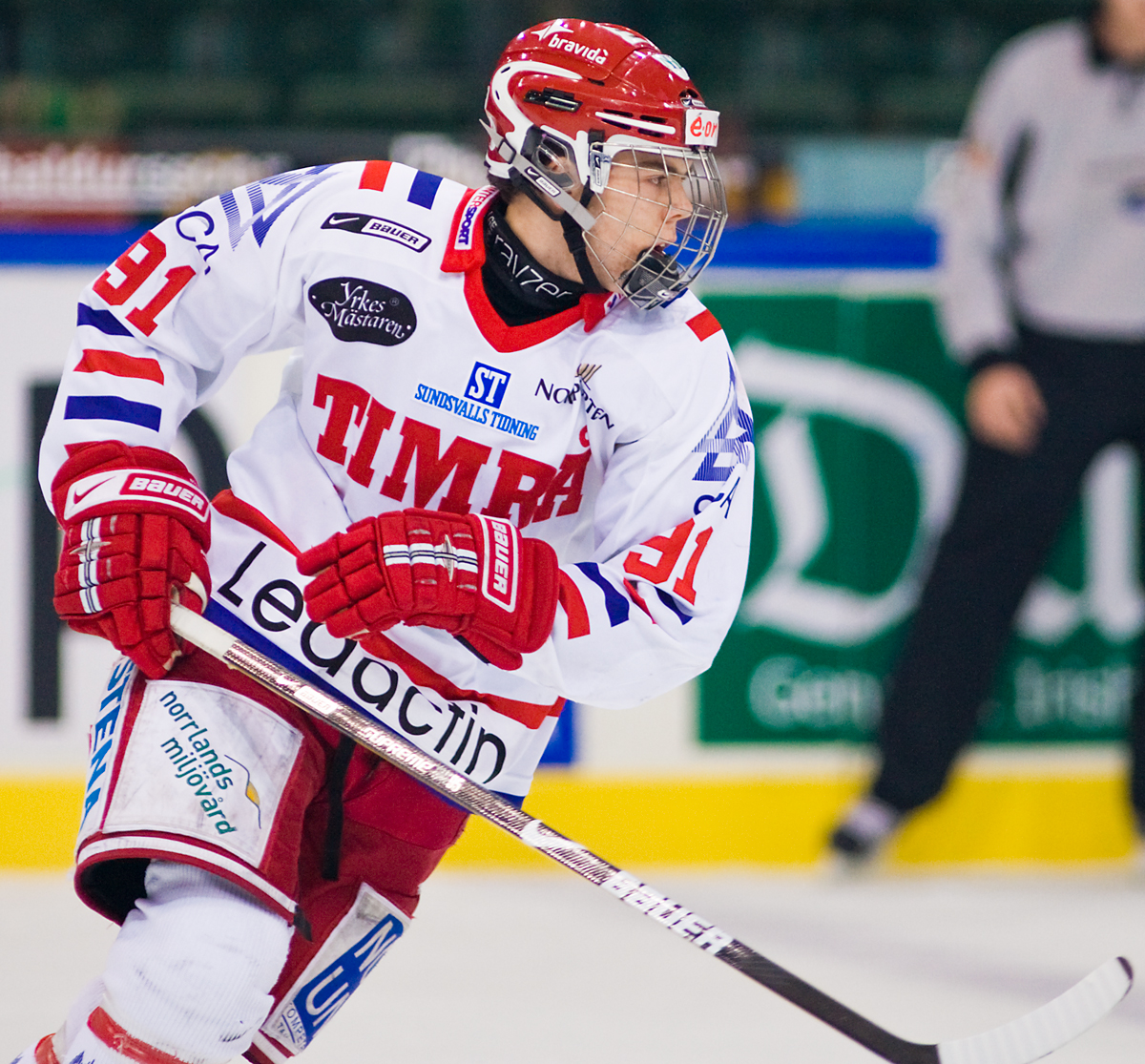
Pääjärvi began his professional career with Timrå in Sweden

Pääjärvi began playing ice hockey at the age of six. During the 2005–06 season, as a 14-year-old, he made his debut for Malmö Redhawks in the J20 SuperElit, and scored eight goals in eight games during TV-pucken, leding Skåne to a silver medal. He also scored two goals when Malmö won the final of the Swedish Championship for 16-year-olds. In the following season, he played a steadier role for Malmö in the J20 SuperElit, and again led Skåne to a silver medal in TV-pucken.

In 2007, Pääjärvi signed with Timrå IK, where his older brother, Björn Svensson, played for the senior team. On 24 September, Pääjärvi made his Elitserien debut at the age of 16, five months and 12 days, becoming the fourth-youngest player in the Elitserien's history. In the game, he recorded an assist on Timrå's opening goal in the first period of play. His first career goal was a game winner in a 1–0 game against HV71 on 16 February 2008, assisted by linemate Anton Lander.

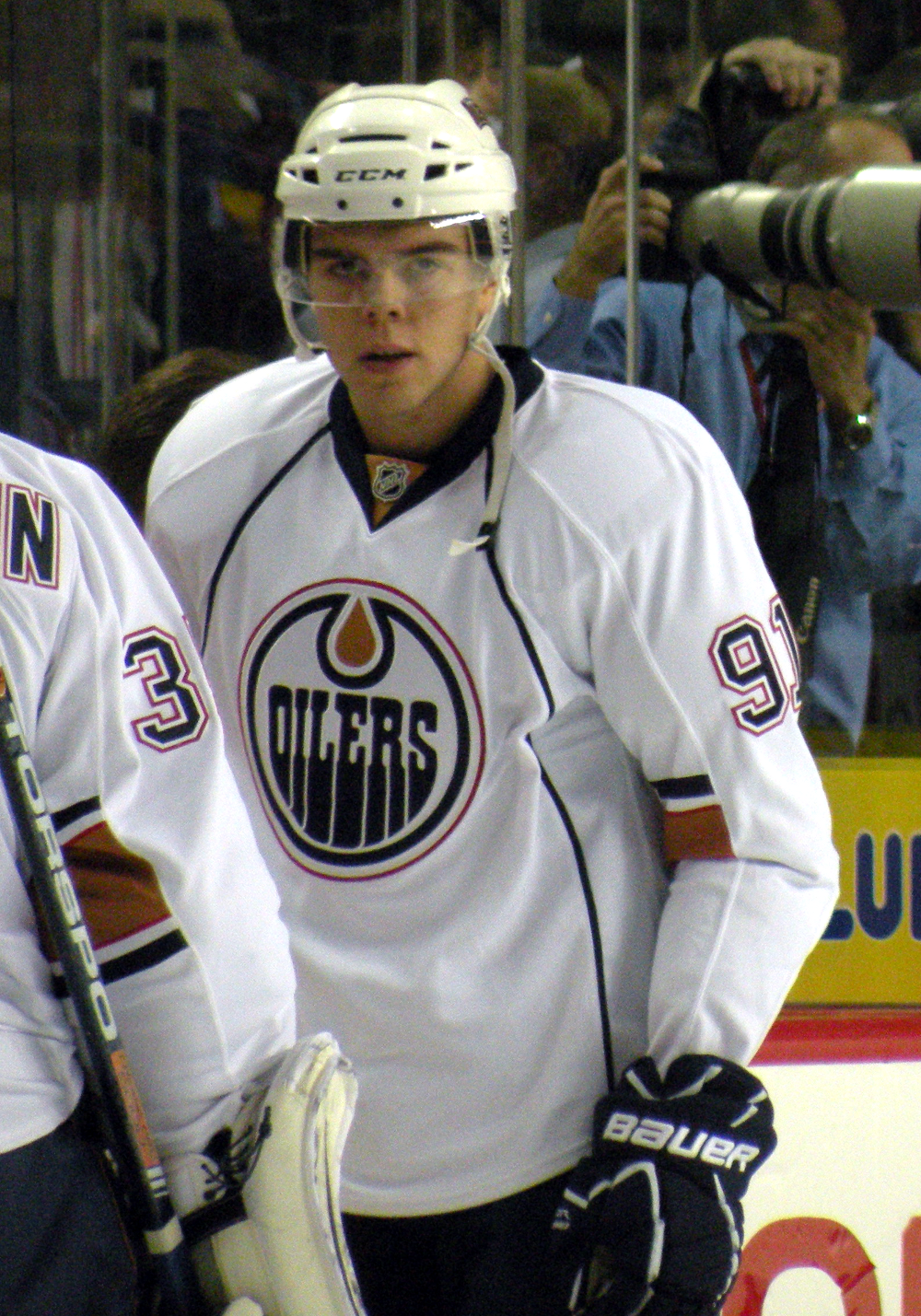
Pääjärvi with the Oilers in 2011

Pääjärvi was later drafted in the first round, tenth overall, by the Edmonton Oilers in the 2009 NHL entry draft. He was also selected 19th overall by the Kontinental Hockey League (KHL)'s Lokomotiv Yaroslavl in the 2009 KHL Entry Draft.

Pääjärvi was announced as a nominee for 2009–10 Elitserien Rookie of the Year on 20 January.

=== NHL ===
==== Edmonton Oilers ====
On 2 June 2010, Pääjärvi signed a three-year, entry-level contract with the Oilers ahead of the 2010–11 season. On 2 September, Pääjärvi announced that he would be shortening his surname on his NHL jersey from "Pääjärvi-Svensson," as was hitherto written, to simply "Pääjärvi," and that he will wear the jersey number 91.

On 23 September, in his first pre-season game with Edmonton, Pääjärvi scored a hat-trick and registered an assist for four points as the Oilers defeated the Tampa Bay Lightning, 5–2. On 7 October, Pääjärvi made his NHL regular season debut against the Calgary Flames. He then scored his first career NHL goal nine days later, on 16 October, against Flames goaltender Miikka Kiprusoff. Pääjärvi finished his rookie season with 34 points, finishing sixth on the team in scoring.

In the 2011–12 season, after recording three points in 25 games and having sat-out as a healthy scratch for six games, Pääjärvi was assigned to Edmonton's American Hockey League (AHL) affiliate, the Oklahoma City Barons.

During the 2012–13 NHL lockout, Pääjärvi remained with Oklahoma in the AHL. When play resumed in January 2013 for the 48-game 2012–13 season, Pääjärvi played in 42 games, scoring nine goals and seven assists for 16 points, while also spending further time during the season with the Barons.

==== St. Louis Blues ====
On 10 July 2013, Pääjärvi was traded, along with a second-round pick, to the St. Louis Blues in exchange for left winger David Perron. Later in the off-season, on 2 August, Pääjärvi signed a two-year, $2.4 million contract with St. Louis.

On 29 December 2014, the Blues placed Pääjärvi on waivers and, upon clearing, was assigned to St. Louis' AHL affiliate, the Chicago Wolves, where he remained until the end of the 2014–15 season. Prior to his demotion, he had played in ten games, registering just one assist. Following the 2014–15 NHL season, Pääjärvi became a restricted free agent under the NHL Collective Bargaining Agreement. The St. Louis Blues made him a qualifying offer to retain his NHL rights and, on 5 July 2015, Pääjärvi filed for Salary Arbitration.

Pääjärvi spent the majority of the 2015-16 season with the Blues, appearing in 48 games. Pääjärvi also skated in three playoff games. 2016-17 saw Pääjärvi have more of an even split, playing 32 games for the Blues and 26 for the Wolves. Again, Pääjärvi suited up for the Blues during the playoffs, scoring one goal and two assists.

==== Ottawa Senators ====
On 25 January 2018, the Blues placed Pääjärvi on waivers, where he was claimed by the Ottawa Senators the following day. Pääjärvi finished out the season with 12 points in 79 games.

On 30 May 2018, the Senators signed Pääjärvi to a one-year, $900,000 contract extension. In his second and final season with Ottawa in 2018–19, Pääjärvi registered his highest points totals since his 2011 rookie season, contributing with 11 goals and 18 points in 80 games.

=== KHL ===
As a free agent leading into the 2019–20 season, Pääjärvi halted his NHL career to sign a two-year contract with Russian club, Lokomotiv Yaroslavl of the KHL, on 22 October 2019.

In the midst of his final year under contract in the 2020–21 season, Pääjärvi added 3 goals and 11 points in 26 appearances before he was traded to HC Dynamo Moscow in exchange for Teemu Pulkkinen on 30 November 2020. In 24 games with Dynamo, Pääjärvi posted a further four goals and eight points.

== International play ==
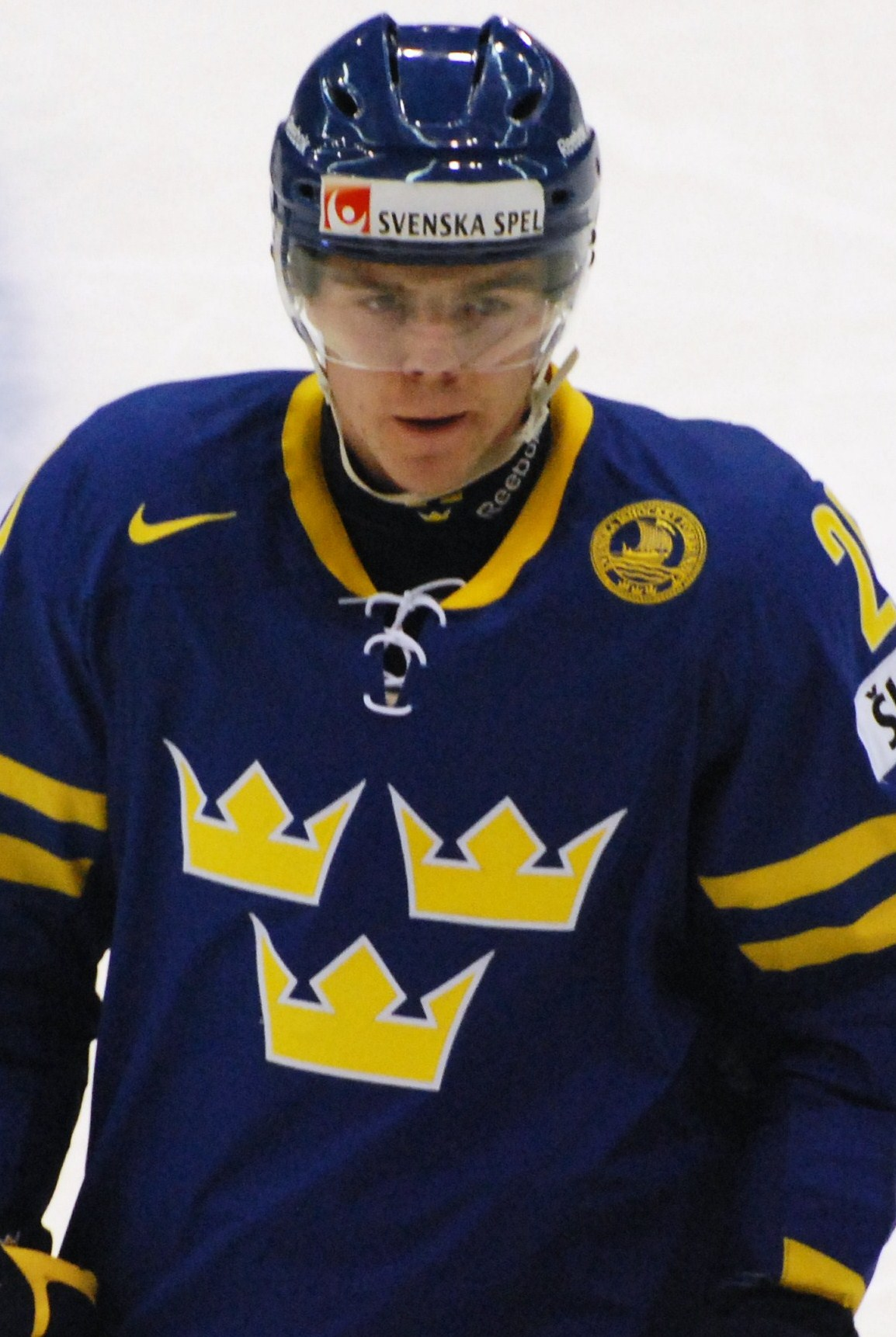

Medal record

Representing Sweden

Ice hockey

World Championships
Gold medal – first place	2018 Denmark	
Silver medal – second place	2011 Slovakia	
Bronze medal – third place	2010 Germany	

World Junior Championships
Bronze medal – third place	2010 Saskatoon	
Silver medal – second place	2009 Ottawa	
Silver medal – second place	2008 Pardubice	

Pääjärvi made his international debut for Sweden at age 14 with the under-16 team during the 2005–06 season; the following season, he became the scoring leader for the U16s. During the 2008 World Junior Ice Hockey Championships in Pardubice and Liberec, Czech Republic, at 16 years and eight months old, he became the youngest player ever to play for Sweden during a World Junior Hockey Championship. During the tournament, he scored one goal, and helped Sweden to the finals when assisting Mikael Backlund on Sweden's overtime game-winning goal against Russia in the semifinal.

Pääjärvi played in the 2010 World Championships, where he led the senior Swedish team in scoring and was selected to the tournament all-star team. He contributed to Sweden's win at the 2018 World Championships by scoring three goals.

== Career statistics ==
=== Regular season and playoffs ===
			Regular season					Playoffs
Season	Team	League	GP	G	A	Pts	PIM	GP	G	A	Pts	PIM
2005–06	Malmö Redhawks	J18 Allsv	13	2	3	5	4	1	0	0	0	0
2005–06	Malmö Redhawks	J20	2	0	0	0	0	—	—	—	—	—
2006–07	Malmö Redhawks	J18	3	3	3	6	0	—	—	—	—	—
2006–07	Malmö Redhawks	J20	20	4	2	6	6	4	0	1	1	0
2007–08	Timrå IK	J18	5	1	6	7	4	—	—	—	—	—
2007–08	Timrå IK	J20	18	7	15	22	6	—	—	—	—	—
2007–08	Timrå IK	SEL	35	1	2	3	2	11	0	0	0	2
2008–09	Timrå IK	J20	1	0	0	0	0	—	—	—	—	—
2008–09	Timrå IK	SEL	50	7	10	17	4	7	1	0	1	0
2009–10	Timrå IK	SEL	49	12	17	29	6	5	0	1	1	2
2010–11	Edmonton Oilers	NHL	80	15	19	34	16	—	—	—	—	—
2011–12	Edmonton Oilers	NHL	41	2	6	8	4	—	—	—	—	—
2011–12	Oklahoma City Barons	AHL	34	7	18	25	4	14	2	9	11	2
2012–13	Oklahoma City Barons	AHL	38	4	16	20	10	—	—	—	—	—
2012–13	Edmonton Oilers	NHL	42	9	7	16	14	—	—	—	—	—
2013–14	St. Louis Blues	NHL	55	6	6	12	6	—	—	—	—	—
2014–15	St. Louis Blues	NHL	10	0	1	1	6	—	—	—	—	—
2014–15	Chicago Wolves	AHL	36	11	18	29	6	5	3	1	4	0
2015–16	Chicago Wolves	AHL	7	4	3	7	2	—	—	—	—	—
2015–16	St. Louis Blues	NHL	48	3	6	9	8	3	0	1	1	0
2016–17	St. Louis Blues	NHL	32	8	5	13	6	8	1	2	3	2
2016–17	Chicago Wolves	AHL	26	7	11	18	2	—	—	—	—	—
2017–18	St. Louis Blues	NHL	44	2	2	4	8	—	—	—	—	—
2017–18	Ottawa Senators	NHL	35	6	2	8	4	—	—	—	—	—
2018–19	Ottawa Senators	NHL	80	11	8	19	6	—	—	—	—	—
2019–20	Lokomotiv Yaroslavl	KHL	39	11	8	19	8	6	1	1	2	6
2020–21	Lokomotiv Yaroslavl	KHL	26	3	8	11	5	—	—	—	—	—
2020–21	Dynamo Moscow	KHL	24	4	4	8	4	10	1	0	1	2
2021–22	Malmö Redhawks	SHL	17	2	1	3	2	—	—	—	—	—
2022–23	Timrå IK	SHL	40	7	6	13	0	7	1	2	3	6
2023–24	Timrå IK	SHL	49	11	9	20	8	2	1	0	1	0
2024–25	Timrå IK	SHL	52	7	4	11	4	6	3	0	3	2
SHL totals			292	47	49	96	26	38	6	3	9	12
NHL totals			467	62	62	124	78	11	1	3	4	2
KHL totals			89	18	20	38	17	16	2	1	3	8

=== International ===
Year	Team	Event	Result	GP	G	A	Pts	PIM
2007	Sweden	U18	1st place, gold medalist(s)	4	2	4	6	0
2008	Sweden	WJC	2nd place, silver medalist(s)	6	1	1	2	0
2008	Sweden	WJC18	4th	6	2	3	5	6
2009	Sweden	WJC	2nd place, silver medalist(s)	6	2	5	7	6
2009	Sweden	WJC18	5th	6	6	6	12	0
2010	Sweden	WJC	3rd place, bronze medalist(s)	6	3	7	10	2
2010	Sweden	WC	3rd place, bronze medalist(s)	9	5	4	9	2
2011	Sweden	WC	2nd place, silver medalist(s)	9	2	5	7	2
2018	Sweden	WC	1st place, gold medalist(s)	10	3	0	3	4
Junior totals				34	16	26	42	14
Senior totals				28	10	9	19	8

Awards and achievements
Preceded by Jordan Eberle	Edmonton Oilers first-round draft pick 2009	Succeeded by Taylor Hall
