= Joonas Hallikainen =

Finnish ice hockey player

Joonas Hallikainen (born October 5, 1985, in Helsinki, Finland) is a Finnish ice hockey goaltender.

Hallikainen has played with the Jokerit junior team, and has represented Team Finland in international play. When netminder Pasi Häkkinen left for Denmark after the 2004–2005 season, Hallikainen became the Jokerit #2 goalie in the SM-liiga. With Tim Thomas surprisingly abandoning the team just one day before the regular season opened, Hallikainen had to take on his job with only a day's warning in the first game of the season, a local game versus HIFK, with 10,000 fans in attendance. Hallikainen played an excellent game, which Jokerit won in a shootout after overtime. When netminder Karl Goehring was hurriedly hired to replace Thomas, Hallikainen returned to backup goaltender, and with the arrival of Mikko Rämö, to games with the Jokerit junior team.

In season 2006/07 Jokerit signed goaltender Juuso Riksman as its number 1, with Hallikainen fighting out the back up spot with youngster Niko Hovinen. When Riksman was sidelined with a long-term back injury, Jokerit quickly replaced him with Andy Chiodo, only for him to pick up an injury almost immediately. Jokerit then signed Finnish netminder Ari Ahonen for the number one spot, with Hallikainen backing him up. When Ahonen was in turn injured, Hallikainen made his season debut in Oulu against Kärpät, then leading the league, making 44 saves and allowing only one goal. He followed this up the next day by posting his first career shutout against Ilves.

Hallikainen represented Finland at the 2007 Winter Universiade in Turin, where Finland lost the bronze medal game to come in fourth.

== Career statistics ==
=== Regular season ===
| Season | Team | League | GP | W | L | T | MIN | GA | SO | GAA | Sv% |
|---|---|---|---|---|---|---|---|---|---|---|---|
| 2005–06 | Jokerit | SM-liiga | 5 | 0 | 1 | 1 | 141.27 | 11 | 0 | 4.67 | 86.08% |
| 2006–07 | Jokerit | SM-liiga | 4 | 4 | 0 | 0 | 240 | 6 | 1 | 1.50 | 95.04% |

=== International play ===
| Year | Team | Event | GP | W | L | T | MIN | GA | SO | GAA | Sv% |
|---|---|---|---|---|---|---|---|---|---|---|---|
| 2007 | Finland | Universiade | 6 | 2 | 3 | 1 | 357.30 | 19 | 0 | 3.19 | 89.01% |
