= Jens Henrik Tönjum =

Swedish-born Norwegian ice hockey player (born 1995)

- Born: May 17, 1995 (age 31) Mölndal, Sweden
- Height: 6 ft 0 in (183 cm)
- Weight: 194 lb (88 kg; 13 st 12 lb)
- Position: Left wing
- Shot: Left
- ML team Former teams: Frederikshavn White Hawks; Malmö Redhawks; IK Oskarshamn; IF Sundsvall; Sparta Warriors
- NHL draft: Undrafted
- Playing career: 2014–2020

Jens Henrik Tönjum (born 17 May 1995) is a Swedish-born Norwegian professional ice hockey winger.
