= Niko Hovinen =

Finnish ice hockey player (born 1988)

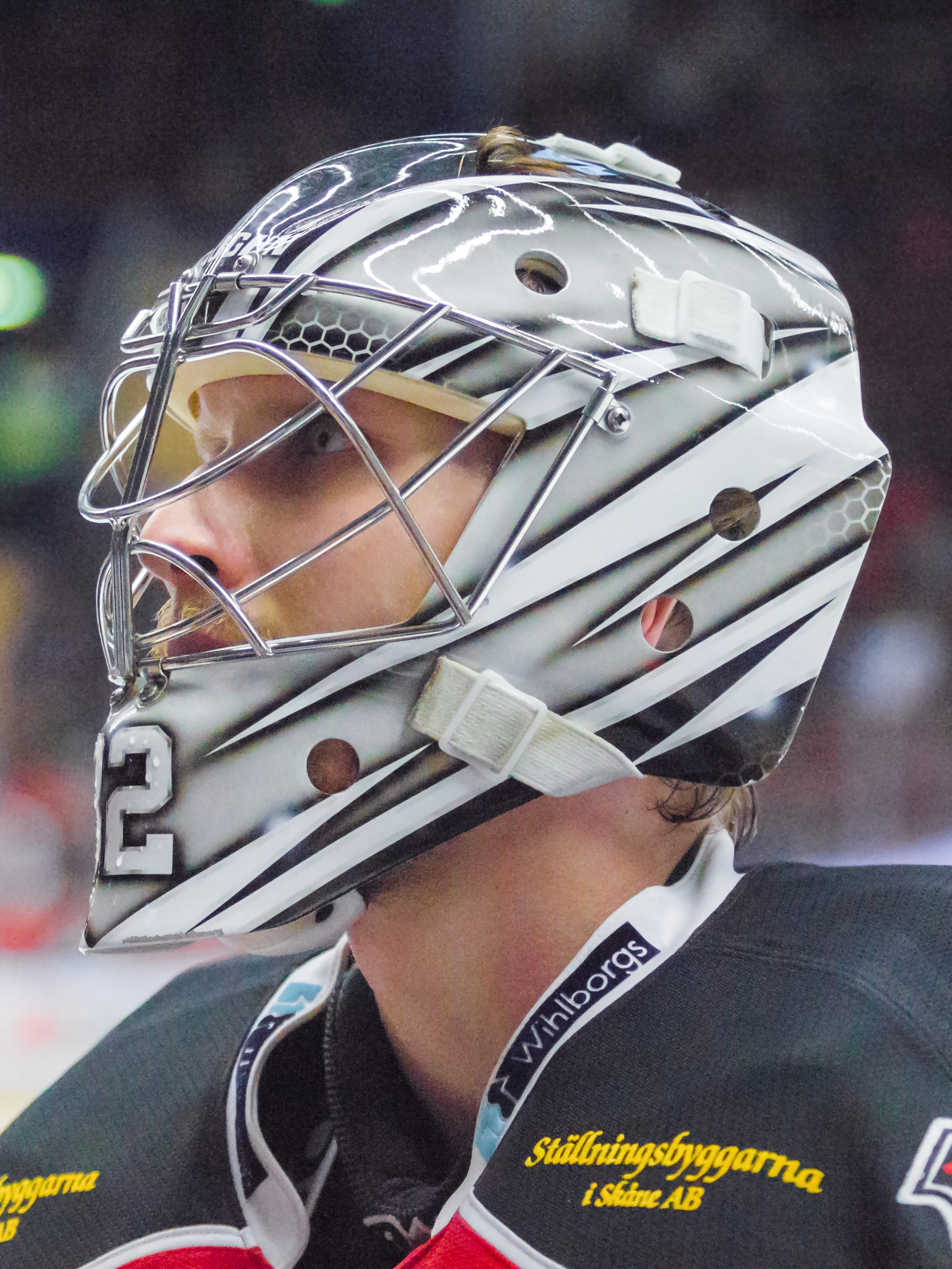
- Born: 16 March 1988 (age 38) Helsinki, Finland
- Height: 6 ft 7 in (201 cm)
- Weight: 200 lb (91 kg; 14 st 4 lb)
- Position: Goaltender
- Catches: Left
- Liiga team Former teams: Tappara; Jokerit; Pelicans; Oklahoma City Barons; Metallurg Novokuznetsk; Admiral Vladivostok; EC Red Bull Salzburg; Luleå HF; Oulun Kärpät; Medveščak Zagreb; KalPa; KooKoo; Lausanne HC; Iserlohn Roosters; Sport; Tappara; HIFK Hockey
- National team: Finland
- NHL draft: 132nd overall, 2006; Minnesota Wild
- Playing career: 2005–present

Niko Hovinen (born 16 March 1988) is a Finnish professional ice hockey goaltender. He is currently playing for Tappara of The SM-Liiga in Finland.

== Playing career ==
=== Jokerit ===
Niko Hovinen's SM-liiga career started during the 2005–06 season when Hovinen dressed for a single regular-season Jokerit game as backup to Joonas Hallikainen, after Tim Thomas abruptly left the team only a day before the start of the 2005–06 regular season. Hovinen returned to the junior team for the rest of the season. He made his first SM-liiga start on 23 November 2006, against SaiPa, again called up when three Jokerit goaltenders were injured.

During the 2007–08 season, Hovinen served as backup to Jussi Markkanen. Hovinen was relegated to no. 3 goaltender when Jokerit acquired Joni Puurula from SaiPa just before the end of regular season. Hovinen dressed up to serve as backup for Joni Puurula in several games during the 2007–08 playoffs as Jussi Markkanen got himself injured during the first game of playoffs.

=== Pelicans ===
During the off-season of 2007–08 SM-liiga season, Niko Hovinen was contracted to Pelicans. For the first time, Niko Hovinen will play outside of Jokerit-organization in 2008–09 season.

A tall goaltender at 196 cm, Hovinen covers the net and is considered a goaltender prospect.

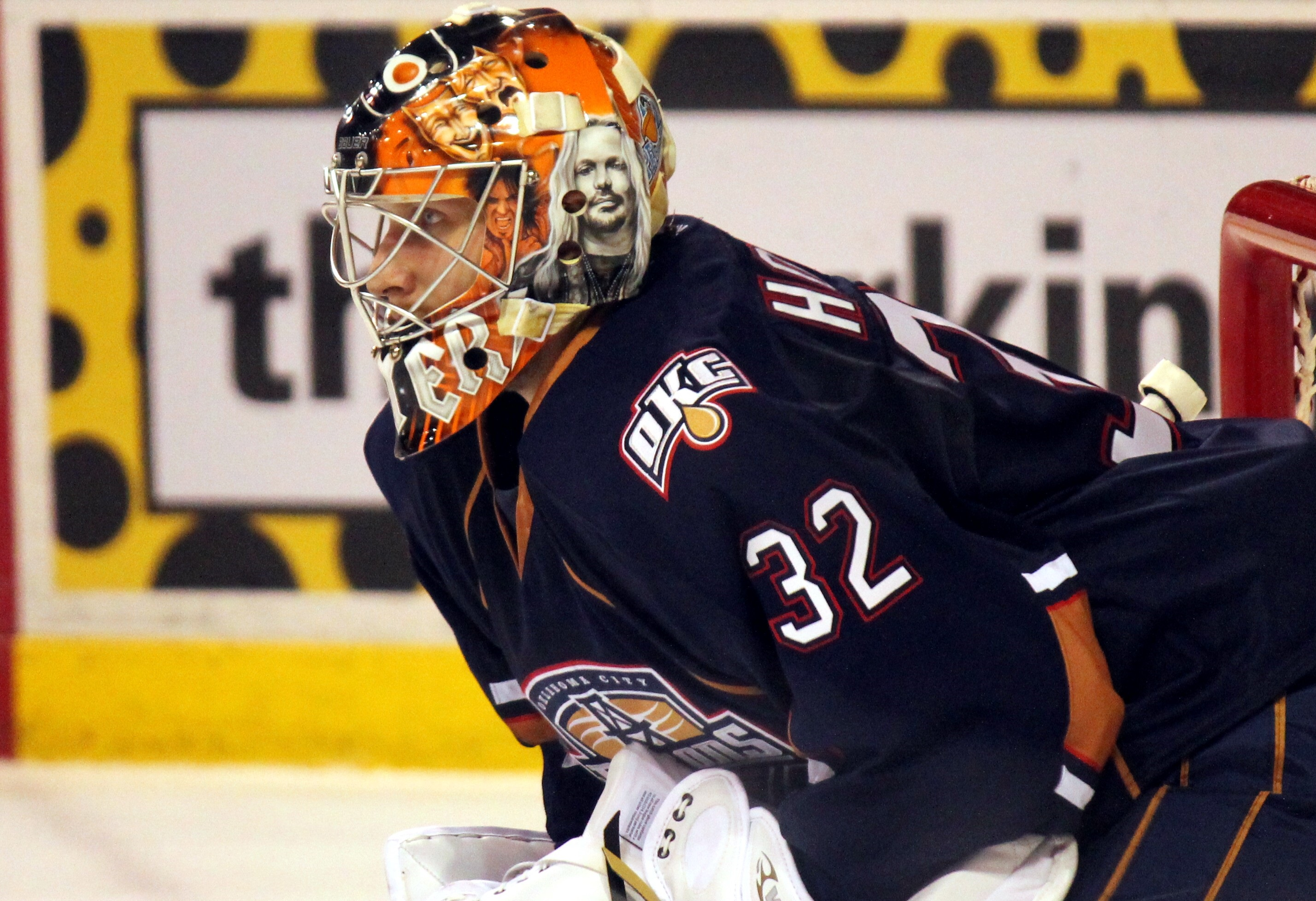
Niko Hovinen with the Oklahoma City Barons.

Hovinen was ranked #10 on the International Scouting Service's list of goaltender prospects for the 2006 NHL entry draft. He was drafted in the fifth round, 132nd overall, by the Minnesota Wild.

=== North America ===
Hovinen signed a two-year entry-level contract with the National Hockey League's Philadelphia Flyers on 17 May 2011. He remained with the Pelicans through the 2011–12 season.

On 25 January 2013 the Edmonton Oilers claimed Hovinen off unconditional waivers. He was assigned to AHL affiliate, the Oklahoma City Barons, where he remained to end the 2013–14 season.

=== Back to Europe ===
On 2 July 2013, Hovinen's NHL rights were retained by the Oilers after he was tendered a qualifying offer. He opted to return to Europe signing a contract with Metallurg Novokuznetsk of the Kontinental Hockey League (KHL), before moving on to fellow KHL team Admiral Vladivostok.

He split the 2014–15 season between EC Salzburg of Austria and Swedish teams Luleå HF and Malmö Redhawks. In the 2015–16 campaign, Hovinen was back in his native Finland for a second stint with the Pelicans. On 13 June 2016, he put pen to paper on a deal with Medvescak Zagreb of the Kontinental Hockey League and parted ways with the club in November 2016. Later that month, he was picked up by KalPa of the Finnish top-flight Liiga. Following a stint at fellow Liiga outfit KooKoo, he signed with Lausanne HC of the Swiss NLA on February 7, 2017.

A free agent from his 2018–19 season stint in the Deutsche Eishockey Liga with the Iserlohn Roosters, Hovinen familiarly returned to the Ligga, agreeing to a one-year contract with Vaasan Sport on 7 October 2019.

Medal record

Representing Finland

Ice hockey

World Championships
Gold medal – first place	2011 Slovakia	

== Career statistics ==
=== Regular season and playoffs ===
			Regular season									Playoffs
Season	Team	League	GP	W	L	T/OT	MIN	GA	SO	GAA	SV%	GP	W	L	MIN	GA	SO	GAA	SV%
2006–07	Jokerit	SM-l	1	0	1	0	60	4	0	4.00	.871	—	—	—	—	—	—	—	—
2007–08	Jokerit	SM-l	4	0	1	0	125	12	0	5.78	.833	—	—	—	—	—	—	—	—
2008–09	Pelicans	SM-l	21	7	12	1	1110	54	2	2.92	.896	1	0	0	11	3	0	15.72	.667
2009–10	Pelicans	SM-l	18	5	7	3	944	47	1	2.99	.914	—	—	—	—	—	—	—	—
2010–11	Pelicans	SM-l	49	17	25	5	2826	122	3	2.59	.921	—	—	—	—	—	—	—	—
2011–12	Pelicans	SM-l	41	21	12	6	2358	89	5	2.26	.921	8	5	2	442	17	2	2.30	.925
2012–13	Trenton Titans	ECHL	16	4	6	3	841	44	0	3.14	.889	—	—	—	—	—	—	—	—
2012–13	Oklahoma City Barons	AHL	10	5	3	2	612	30	1	2.94	.892	—	—	—	—	—	—	—	—
2013–14	Metallurg Novokuznetsk	KHL	18	2	13	0	856	43	0	3.01	.916	—	—	—	—	—	—	—	—
2013–14	Admiral Vladivostok	KHL	7	1	4	0	382	16	0	2.51	.921	—	—	—	—	—	—	—	—
2014–15	EC Red Bull Salzburg	EBEL	5	4	0	0	248	5	2	1.21	.955	—	—	—	—	—	—	—	—
2014–15	Luleå HF	SHL	1	0	1	0	40	4	0	6.00	.692	—	—	—	—	—	—	—	—
2014–15	Malmö Redhawks	Allsv	9	6	3	0	543	21	0	2.32	.916	12	—	—	—	—	—	2.38	.915
2015–16	Oulun Kärpät	Liiga	1	0	0	0	16	3	0	11.30	.500	—	—	—	—	—	—	—	—
2015–16	Pelicans	Liiga	23	5	9	3	1080	59	1	3.28	.876	4	2	2	241	8	0	1.99	.932
2016–17	KHL Medveščak Zagreb	KHL	5	1	4	0	245	22	0	5.39	.842	—	—	—	—	—	—	—	—
2016–17	KalPa	Liiga	8	4	2	2	481	21	0	2.62	.910	—	—	—	—	—	—	—	—
2016–17	KooKoo	Liiga	13	4	5	4	759	32	0	2.53	.910	—	—	—	—	—	—	—	—
2016–17	Lausanne HC	NLA	1	0	0	0	40	2	0	3.00	.936	—	—	—	—	—	—	—	—
2017–18	KalPa	Liiga	22	12	7	3	1319	37	5	1.68	.937	6	2	3	335	14	0	2.51	.902
2018–19	KalPa	Liiga	5	1	2	2	305	14	0	2.75	.880	—	—	—	—	—	—	—	—
2018–19	Iserlohn Roosters	DEL	23	8	15	0	1382	75	0	3.00	.900	—	—	—	—	—	—	—	—
Liiga totals			179	63	74	14	9630	443	12	2.69	.908	13	7	4	695	28	2	2.58	.920
