= Tobias Ericsson =

Swedish professional ice hockey player

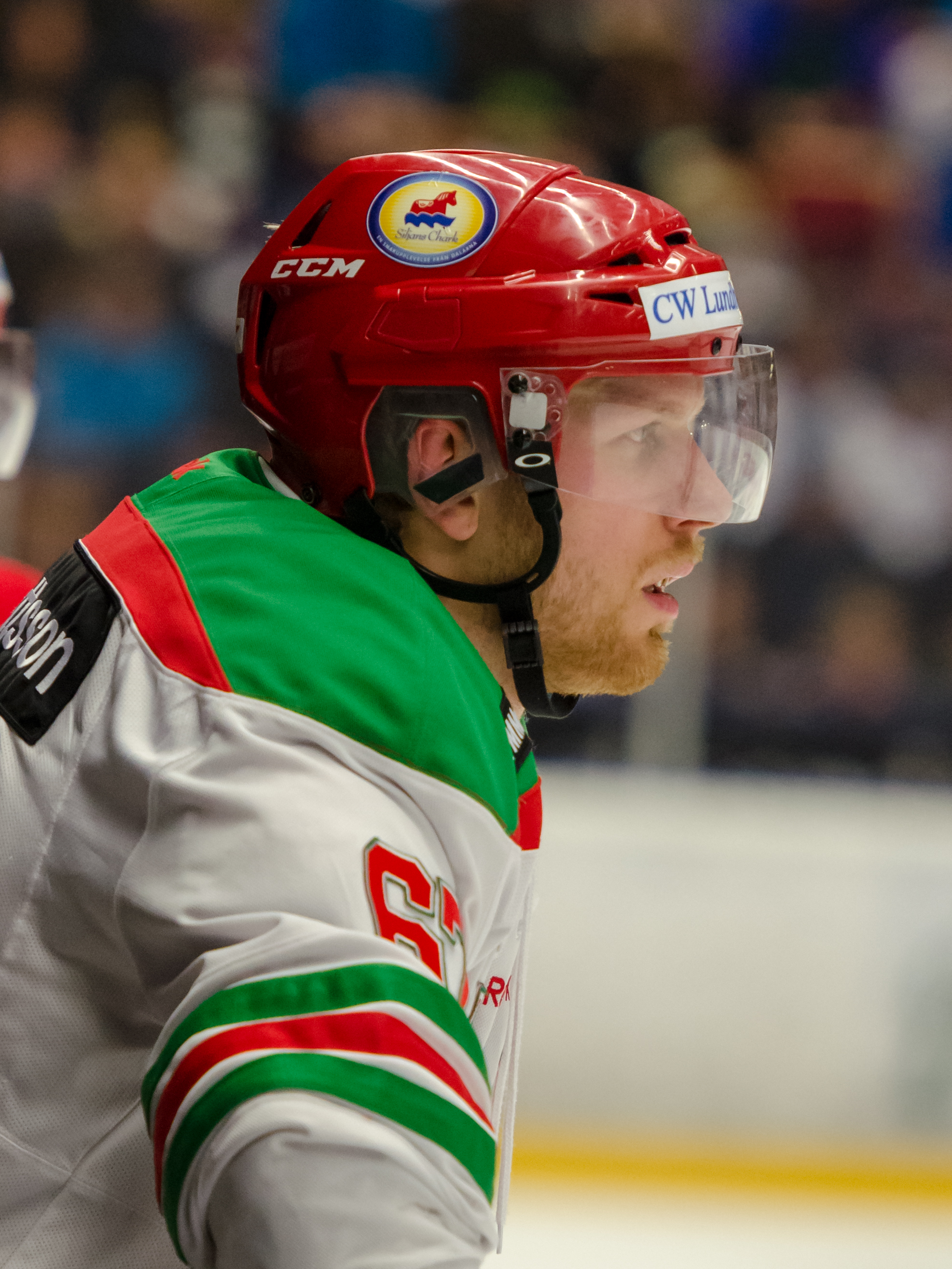
- Born: July 29, 1987 (age 39) Stockholm, Sweden
- Height: 6 ft 2 in (188 cm)
- Weight: 190 lb (86 kg; 13 st 8 lb)
- Position: Left wing
- Shoots: Left
- Played for: AIK IF; Malmö Redhawks
- Playing career: 2005–present

Tobias Ericsson (born July 29, 1987 in Stockholm) is a Swedish professional ice hockey player (left wing). He played 41 games with AIK of the Elitserien (SEL) in the 2010–11 season. His originally played with his youth team, Vallentuna BK.

After two seasons with Mora IK, including the 2012–13 season as Captain, Ericsson left to sign as a free agent to a contract with rival Allsvenskan club, Malmö on March 11, 2013.

== Career statistics ==
			Regular season					Playoffs
Season	Team	League	GP	G	A	Pts	PIM	GP	G	A	Pts	PIM
2003–04	IF Vallentuna BK	J20	24	9	14	23	22	—	—	—	—	—
2004–05	IF Vallentuna BK	J20	23	14	9	23	39	—	—	—	—	—
2004–05	IF Vallentuna BK	Swe.2	23	1	0	1	6	—	—	—	—	—
2004–05	Rimbo IF	Swe.3	1	0	0	0	0	—	—	—	—	—
2005–06	AIK IF	J20	41	12	7	19	46	—	—	—	—	—
2006–07	AIK IF	J20	11	4	7	11	35	—	—	—	—	—
2006–07	AIK IF	Swe.1	25	0	1	1	20	—	—	—	—	—
2007–08	AIK IF	J20	5	3	3	6	6	—	—	—	—	—
2007–08	AIK IF	Swe.1	35	2	8	10	6	—	—	—	—	—
2007–08	Skå IK	Swe.2	2	1	2	3	0	—	—	—	—	—
2008–09	AIK IF	Swe.1	44	11	9	20	22	10	0	0	0	6
2009–10	AIK IF	J20	1	0	1	1	0	—	—	—	—	—
2009–10	AIK IF	Swe.1	50	7	9	16	12	10	2	2	4	6
2010–11	AIK IF	SEL	41	1	4	5	14	1	0	0	0	0
2011–12	Mora IK	Swe.1	52	5	11	16	22	—	—	—	—	—
2012–13	Mora IK	Swe.1	49	16	18	34	20	—	—	—	—	—
SEL totals			41	1	4	5	14	1	0	0	0	0
