= Björn Hellkvist =

Swedish ice hockey player and coach

- Born: January 3, 1977 (age 48); Malmö, Sweden
- Height: 1.75 m (5 ft 9 in)
- Weight: 80 kg (176 lb; 12 st 8 lb)
- Position: Forward
- Shot: —
- Played for: Rögle BK; Jonstorps IF
- Current SHL coach: Leksands IF
- Coached for: Jonstorps IF; Rögle BK; Malmö Redhawks; Rungsted Seier Capital; IK Oskarshamn; MoDo Hockey
- Playing career: 1994–2004
- Coaching career: 2004–present

Björn Hellkvist (born 3 January 1977) is an ice hockey coach and former ice hockey player. He currently serves as head coach of IF Björklöven in the Swedish second division, HockeyAllsvenskan.

== Career ==
Hellkvist played as a professional for Rögle BK and Jonstorps IF in the Swedish Division 1 and Division 2 between 1994 and 2004. He also played in the J20 SuperElit as a youth player.

As a coach Hellkvist was first active as head coach for Jonstorps IF before moving on to the youth ranks at Rögle BK. He later progressed to become assistant coach and later head coach at the same club. After a brief career pause due to suffering from Parkinson's disease Hellkvist returned to the industry to become assistant coach for Malmö Redhawks. After the 2014–15 season, Hellkvist was made head coach. He stayed as head coach over the 2015-2016 season, when he left for Danish club Rungsted Seier Capital in the Danish Hockey League.

Hellkvist returned to Swedish hockey as head coach for IK Oskarshamn for the 2016-2017 season and Modo Hockey for two seasons 2018-202, both in HockeyAllsvenskan, before joining Leksands IF in the Swedish Hockey League a controversial move in 2020. In October 2023, Hellkvist became ill again and went on an extended sick leave.

He returned as a head coach for the start of the 2024 season, with IF Björklöven in HockeyAllsvenskan.
