= Björn Svensson =

Swedish professional ice hockey forward (born 1986)

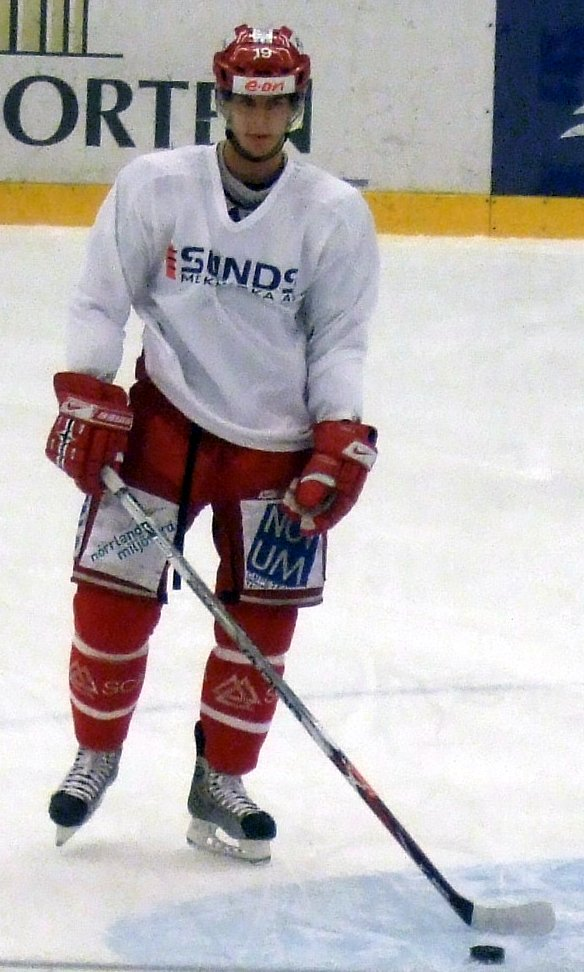
- Born: 16 June 1986 (age 38); Ljungby, Sweden
- Height: 6 ft 0 in (183 cm)
- Weight: 187 lb (85 kg; 13 st 5 lb)
- Position: Winger
- Shoots: Left
- team Former teams: Free Agent; Timra IK; HC Sierre; Modo Hockey; Malmö Redhawks; Färjestad BK; ERC Ingolstadt
- NHL draft: Undrafted
- Playing career: 2003–present
- Website: BjornSvensson.se

Björn Svensson (born 16 June 1986) is a Swedish professional ice hockey forward, currently an unrestricted free agent who most recently played for ERC Ingolstadt in the Deutsche Eishockey Liga (DEL). He is the older brother of Magnus Pääjärvi-Svensson, who plays in the Swedish Hockey League with Timrå IK.

Svensson has played in the Swedish Hockey League with Timra IK, Modo Hockey, Malmö Redhawks and Färjestad BK. In the midst of the 2016–17 season with Färjestad BK, having appeared in 31 games and compiling just 6 points, Svensson left Sweden in agreeing to a contract for the remainder of the year with German club, ERC Ingolstadt of the DEL on 13 January 2017. Svensson added 8 points in 16 games before suffering a preliminary playoff loss with Ingolstadt to the Fischtown Pinguins to conclude his tenure with ERC.

== Career statistics ==
=== Regular season and playoffs ===
			Regular season					Playoffs
Season	Team	League	GP	G	A	Pts	PIM	GP	G	A	Pts	PIM
2001–02	Malmö Redhawks	J20	2	0	0	0	0	—	—	—	—	—
2002–03	Malmö Redhawks	J20	14	5	4	9	8	—	—	—	—	—
2003–04	Saskatoon Blades	WHL	36	4	6	10	8	—	—	—	—	—
2004–05	Saskatoon Blades	WHL	56	10	16	26	14	4	0	1	1	2
2005–06	Moose Jaw Warriors	WHL	62	17	38	55	20	22	4	3	7	10
2006–07	Timrå IK	SEL	55	6	10	16	30	7	1	0	1	27
2007–08	Timrå IK	SEL	54	8	4	12	10	11	0	0	0	4
2008–09	Timrå IK	SEL	45	8	14	22	20	7	1	4	5	0
2009–10	Timrå IK	SEL	55	12	11	23	20	5	0	1	1	4
2010–11	Timrå IK	SEL	55	4	14	18	20	—	—	—	—	—
2011–12	HC Sierre-Anniviers	NLB	10	3	4	7	2	—	—	—	—	—
2011–12	Modo Hockey	SEL	32	3	7	10	8	6	0	0	0	0
2012–13	Modo Hockey	SEL	40	3	3	6	6	1	0	0	0	0
2013–14	Malmö Redhawks	Allsv	52	18	18	36	22	8	0	1	1	2
2014–15	Malmö Redhawks	Allsv	44	16	9	25	10	12	3	0	3	4
2015–16	Malmö Redhawks	SHL	47	14	3	17	10	—	—	—	—	—
2016–17	Färjestad BK	SHL	31	3	3	6	4	—	—	—	—	—
2016–17	ERC Ingolstadt	DEL	16	2	6	8	0	2	1	0	1	0
SHL totals			414	61	69	130	128	37	2	5	7	35

=== International ===
Year	Team	Event	Result	GP	G	A	Pts	PIM
2005	Sweden	WJC	6th	6	0	0	0	0
Junior totals				6	0	0	0	0
