= Frederik Storm =

Danish ice hockey player (born 1989)

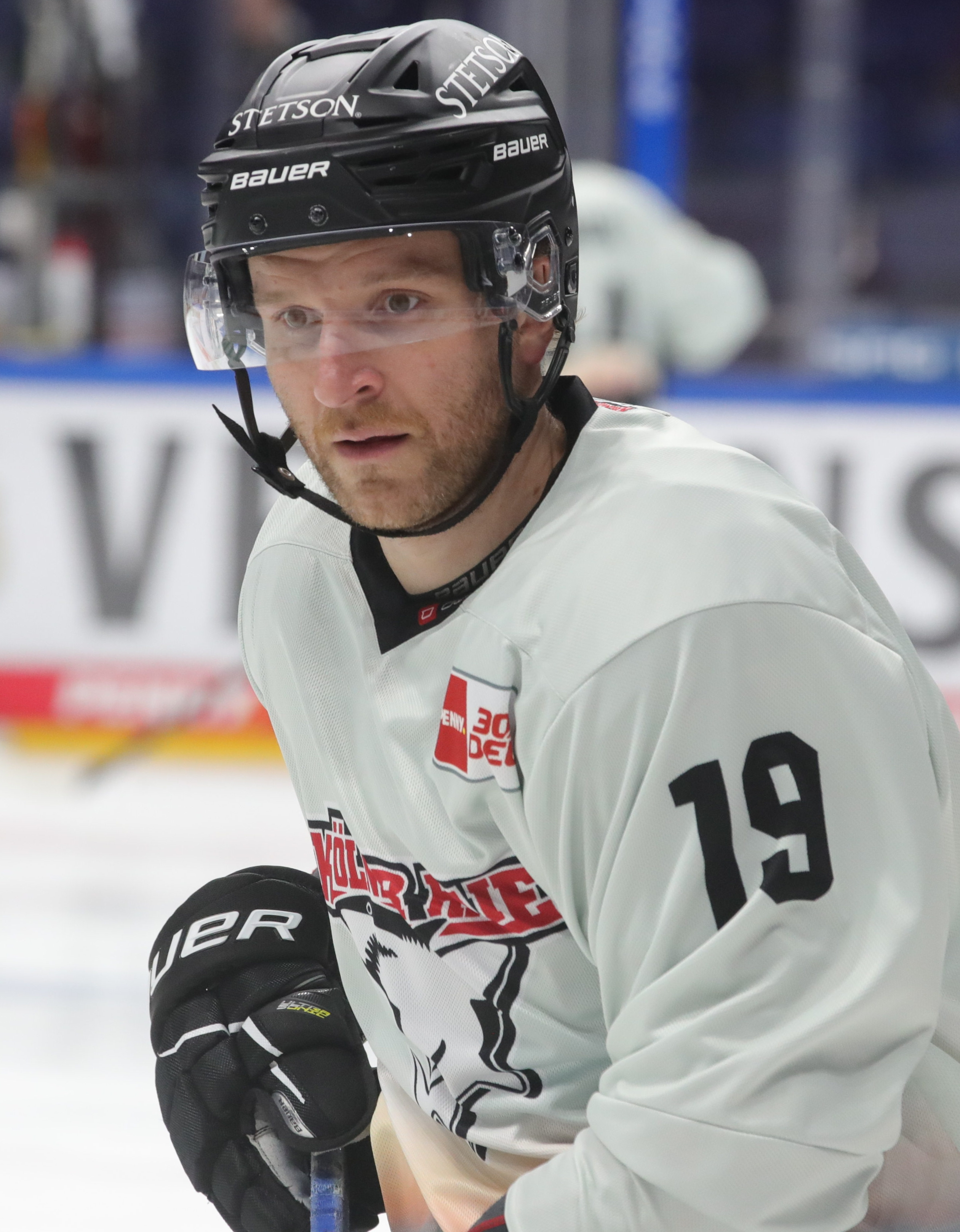
- Storm in 2023
- Born: 20 February 1989 (age 37) Gentofte, Denmark
- Height: 5 ft 11 in (180 cm)
- Weight: 190 lb (86 kg; 13 st 8 lb)
- Position: Winger
- Shoots: Left
- DEL team Former teams: Kölner Haie; Herlev Hornets; SønderjyskE Ishockey; Malmö Redhawks; ERC Ingolstadt
- National team: Denmark
- Playing career: 2007–present

Frederik Storm (born 20 February 1989) is a Danish professional ice hockey player who is a winger for Kölner Haie of the Deutsche Eishockey Liga (DEL). He first participated as a member of the Denmark men's national ice hockey team at the 2011 IIHF World Championship.

== Career ==
On 2 November 2016, Storm agreed to a three-year contract extension to remain with the Malmö Redhawks of the Swedish Hockey League (SHL).

Following three seasons in the DEL with ERC Ingolstadt, Storm opted to remain in Germany by signing as a free agent to a one-year contract with fellow DEL outfit, Kölner Haie, on 3 May 2023.

== Career statistics ==
=== Regular season and playoffs ===
			Regular season					Playoffs
Season	Team	League	GP	G	A	Pts	PIM	GP	G	A	Pts	PIM
2004–05	IC Gentofte	DEN U20	28	14	28	42	20	—	—	—	—	—
2004–05	IC Gentofte	DEN.2	3	2	1	3	14	—	—	—	—	—
2005–06	Herlev Hornets	DEN U20	26	33	22	55	49	2	0	1	1	0
2005–06	Herlev Hornets	DEN	4	0	1	1	0	—	—	—	—	—
2005–06	Herlev Hornets II	DEN.2	14	4	8	12	10	—	—	—	—	—
2006–07	Herlev/Rungsted	DEN U20	21	31	29	60	32	—	—	—	—	—
2006–07	Herlev Hornets	DEN	23	4	2	6	4	—	—	—	—	—
2005–06	Herlev/Rungsted	DEN.2	12	8	5	13	14	—	—	—	—	—
2007–08	Herlev/KSF	DEN U20	11	19	29	48	16	3	2	2	4	0
2007–08	Herlev Hornets	DEN	44	14	13	27	16	—	—	—	—	—
2007–08	Kjøbenhavns Skøjteløberforening	DEN.2	2	1	4	5	2	—	—	—	—	—
2008–09	Herlev Hornets	DEN U20	19	32	19	51	8	—	—	—	—	—
2008–09	Herlev Hornets	DEN	39	4	9	13	12	—	—	—	—	—
2009–10	SønderjyskE	DEN	33	17	14	31	6	13	6	11	17	0
2010–11	SønderjyskE	DEN	39	18	20	38	18	12	3	5	8	2
2011–12	Herlev Eagles	DEN	40	20	24	44	8	4	2	2	4	4
2012–13	Malmö Redhawks	Allsv	50	10	14	24	8	—	—	—	—	—
2013–14	Malmö Redhawks	Allsv	52	13	17	30	51	10	4	3	7	0
2014–15	Malmö Redhawks	Allsv	50	21	22	43	16	12	1	2	3	0
2015–16	Malmö Redhawks	SHL	46	12	12	24	8	—	—	—	—	—
2016–17	Malmö Redhawks	SHL	45	8	16	24	37	13	4	4	8	2
2017–18	Malmö Redhawks	SHL	43	12	15	27	10	10	5	0	5	4
2018–19	Malmö Redhawks	SHL	47	17	12	29	6	5	1	0	1	4
2019–20	Malmö Redhawks	SHL	50	12	14	26	34	—	—	—	—	—
2020–21	ERC Ingolstadt	DEL	27	9	8	17	18	5	0	2	2	2
2021–22	ERC Ingolstadt	DEL	43	16	29	45	16	—	—	—	—	—
2022–23	ERC Ingolstadt	DEL	49	20	23	43	10	16	3	3	6	10
2023–24	Kölner Haie	DEL	50	12	13	25	24	3	1	0	1	0
2024–25	Kölner Haie	DEL	46	14	12	26	0	16	1	3	4	4
2025–26	Kölner Haie	DEL	43	9	5	14	14	9	1	3	4	2
DEN totals			222	77	83	160	64	29	11	18	29	6
SHL totals			231	61	69	130	95	28	10	4	14	10

=== International ===
Year	Team	Event	GP	G	A	Pts	PIM
2007	Denmark	WJC18 D1	5	3	3	6	0
2009	Denmark	WJC D1	5	1	0	1	4
2011	Denmark	WC	6	0	0	0	0
2012	Denmark	WC	7	0	0	0	0
2013	Denmark	OGQ	3	1	1	2	2
2013	Denmark	WC	7	0	0	0	2
2014	Denmark	WC	7	1	1	2	0
2015	Denmark	WC	7	1	0	1	4
2016	Denmark	WC	8	1	4	5	0
2016	Denmark	OGQ	3	1	0	1	0
2017	Denmark	WC	7	1	2	3	4
2018	Denmark	WC	7	2	0	2	2
2019	Denmark	WC	7	1	2	3	6
2021	Denmark	WC	5	0	0	0	2
2021	Denmark	OGQ	3	2	3	5	0
2022	Denmark	OG	5	2	1	3	2
2022	Denmark	WC	7	1	5	6	2
2023	Denmark	WC	7	0	1	1	2
2024	Denmark	WC	6	1	1	2	2
2024	Denmark	OGQ	3	0	0	0	0
2026	Denmark	OG	4	0	0	0	0
2026	Denmark	WC	7	0	0	0	0
Junior totals			10	4	3	7	4
Senior totals			104	11	17	28	28
