= Stefan Warg =

Swedish ice hockey player (born 1990)

- Born: February 6, 1990 (age 36) Stockholm, Sweden
- Height: 6 ft 3 in (191 cm)
- Weight: 220 lb (100 kg; 15 st 10 lb)
- Position: Defence
- Shoots: Right
- ELH team Former teams: HC Sparta Praha; Norfolk Admirals; Skellefteå AIK; Malmö Redhawks; Örebro HK; Djurgårdens IF; KooKoo
- NHL draft: 143rd overall, 2008; Anaheim Ducks
- Playing career: 2008–present

Stefan Warg (born February 6, 1990) is a Swedish professional ice hockey defenceman currently playing for HC Sparta Praha in the Czech Extraliga (ELH). Warg was selected by the Anaheim Ducks in the 5th round (143rd overall) of the 2008 NHL entry draft.

== Playing career ==
Warg attended Anaheim's 2008 training camp, but on September 26, 2008 he was assigned to play in the Western Hockey League (WHL) with the Seattle Thunderbirds.

During his second WHL season, Warg was traded from Seattle to the Prince Albert Raiders. At the end of the season he returned to Sweden to play professionally in the HockeyAllsvenskan with Örebro HK.

Warg signed with Vasteras HK in the Allsvenskan for the 2012–13 season.

At the start of the 2013–14 season Warg returned to North American to play for Anaheim's American Hockey League affiliate, the Norfolk Admirals, however after being demoted to the Utah Grizzlies of the ECHL, Warg and the Anaheim Ducks mutually terminated his contract and he returned Sweden, signing with Skelleftea AIK of the Swedish Hockey League.

== Career statistics ==
			Regular season					Playoffs
Season	Team	League	GP	G	A	Pts	PIM	GP	G	A	Pts	PIM
2007–08	VIK Västerås HK	J20	33	2	6	8	62	3	0	0	0	14
2007–08	VIK Västerås HK	Allsv	—	—	—	—	—	3	0	0	0	0
2008–09	Seattle Thunderbirds	WHL	70	1	16	17	80	5	0	0	0	2
2009–10	Seattle Thunderbirds	WHL	37	0	17	17	80	—	—	—	—	—
2009–10	Prince Albert Raiders	WHL	27	0	7	7	42	—	—	—	—	—
2010–11	Örebro HK	Allsv	50	1	6	7	129	10	0	1	1	37
2011–12	Örebro HK	Allsv	51	2	3	5	42	10	0	0	0	14
2012–13	VIK Västerås HK	Allsv	52	4	15	19	40	10	1	1	2	2
2013–14	Norfolk Admirals	AHL	21	0	1	1	2	—	—	—	—	—
2013–14	Utah Grizzlies	ECHL	3	0	2	2	2	—	—	—	—	—
2013–14	Skellefteå AIK	SHL	7	0	0	0	4	1	0	0	0	0
2014–15	Malmö Redhawks	Allsv	51	2	8	10	38	12	0	0	0	4
2015–16	Malmö Redhawks	SHL	48	0	9	9	20	—	—	—	—	—
2016–17	Malmö Redhawks	SHL	45	0	3	3	6	11	0	1	1	27
2017–18	Malmö Redhawks	SHL	52	3	11	14	22	10	0	2	2	2
2018–19	Malmö Redhawks	SHL	33	0	6	6	26	—	—	—	—	—
2018–19	Örebro HK	SHL	17	1	1	2	2	2	0	0	0	0
2019–20	Örebro HK	SHL	49	0	5	5	36	—	—	—	—	—
2020–21	Örebro HK	SHL	52	4	4	8	22	8	0	2	2	6
2021–22	Örebro HK	SHL	14	0	1	1	2	—	—	—	—	—
2021–22	Djurgårdens IF	SHL	37	0	3	3	14	—	—	—	—	—
2022–23	KooKoo	Liiga	32	1	5	6	10	—	—	—	—	—
SHL totals			354	8	43	51	154	32	0	5	5	35
