= Magnus Häggström =

Swedish ice hockey player

- Born: November 4, 1986 (age 38); Örnsköldsvik, Sweden
- Height: 6 ft 2 in (188 cm)
- Weight: 207 lb (94 kg; 14 st 11 lb)
- Position: Winger
- Shot: Right
- Played for: Modo Hockey; Malmö Redhawks; IF Sundsvall Hockey; Rögle BK
- Playing career: 2006–2021

Magnus Häggström (born November 4, 1986, in Örnsköldsvik, Sweden) is a Swedish former professional ice hockey player.

Häggström played in the Elitserien (SEL) with Modo Hockey during the 2009–10 and 2010–11 Elitserien seasons.
