= Johan Björk =

Swedish ice hockey player

- Born: August 28, 1984 (age 41) Malmö, Sweden
- Height: 6 ft 1 in (185 cm)
- Weight: 194 lb (88 kg; 13 st 12 lb)
- Position: Defence
- Shot: Left
- SHL team Former teams: Malmö Redhawks; HV71; HK Acroni Jesenice; Lukko; HC TWK Innsbruck
- NHL draft: 125th overall, 2002; Ottawa Senators
- Playing career: 2002–2022

Johan Björk (born August 28, 1984) is a Swedish professional ice hockey defenseman who last played for IK Pantern.

Björk was selected by the Ottawa Senators in the fourth round, 125th overall, of the 2002 NHL Entry Draft after playing with Malmö Redhawks in the Swedish Elitserien. He was described by scouting reports as a defensively reliable player with physical play, mobility and puck-moving ability.

On June 6, 2014, Björk left Malmö of the HockeyAllsvenskan for a second time, in agreeing to a one-year contract with Austrian club, HC TWK Innsbruck of the EBEL. He returned to the Redhawks later in the season, and helped the club gain promotion to the SHL.

== Career statistics ==
=== Regular season and playoffs ===
			Regular season					Playoffs
Season	Team	League	GP	G	A	Pts	PIM	GP	G	A	Pts	PIM
1999–2000	MIF Redhawks	J18 Allsv	8	1	0	1	8	—	—	—	—	—
2000–01	MIF Redhawks	J18 Allsv	3	0	0	0	8	—	—	—	—	—
2000–01	MIF Redhawks	J20	19	0	1	1	12	3	0	1	1	0
2001–02	MIF Redhawks	J20	36	1	4	5	70	8	0	0	0	6
2001–02	MIF Redhawks	J18 Allsv	—	—	—	—	—	2	0	0	0	4
2002–03	MIF Redhawks	J20	22	7	12	19	36	6	0	2	2	6
2002–03	MIF Redhawks	SEL	21	0	0	0	6	—	—	—	—	—
2003–04	Malmö Redhawks	J20	16	4	5	9	6	3	0	0	0	0
2003–04	Malmö Redhawks	SEL	27	1	0	1	6	—	—	—	—	—
2004–05	Malmö Redhawks	J20	4	0	0	0	41	—	—	—	—	—
2004–05	Malmö Redhawks	SEL	31	0	0	0	6	—	—	—	—	—
2004–05	Mörrums GoIS IK	Allsv	21	0	3	3	10	9	0	0	0	4
2005–06	Malmö Redhawks	Allsv	33	4	4	8	51	10	1	4	5	12
2006–07	Malmö Redhawks	J20	4	4	2	6	14	—	—	—	—	—
2006–07	Malmö Redhawks	SEL	46	2	3	5	59	—	—	—	—	—
2007–08	Malmö Redhawks	Allsv	41	11	9	20	28	10	4	2	6	6
2008–09	Malmö Redhawks	Allsv	27	4	5	9	18	—	—	—	—	—
2008–09	HV71	SEL	7	0	2	2	0	15	0	0	0	2
2009–10	HV71	SEL	29	0	2	2	6	10	0	2	2	4
2010–11	HV71	J20	1	0	1	1	0	—	—	—	—	—
2010–11	HV71	SEL	39	0	2	2	12	4	0	0	0	2
2011–12	HK Acroni Jesenice	AUT	11	1	6	7	6	—	—	—	—	—
2011–12	Lukko	SM-liiga	12	0	0	0	2	—	—	—	—	—
2012–13	Malmö Redhawks	Allsv	46	1	8	9	28	—	—	—	—	—
2013–14	Malmö Redhawks	Allsv	50	0	9	9	28	9	2	0	2	2
2014–15	HC TWK Innsbruck	AUT	31	0	7	7	20	—	—	—	—	—
2014–15	Malmö Redhawks	Allsv	13	0	0	0	8	10	0	4	4	2
2015–16	Malmö Redhawks	SHL	19	0	0	0	2	—	—	—	—	—
2015–16	IK Pantern	Allsv	22	2	3	5	22	—	—	—	—	—
2016–17	IK Pantern	Allsv	46	12	12	24	18	5	0	2	2	2
2019–20	IK Pantern	SWE.4	22	7	13	20	10	3	1	2	3	2
2020–21	IK Pantern	SWE.4	4	2	3	5	4	—	—	—	—	—
2021–22	IK Pantern	SWE.4	22	7	24	31	16	—	—	—	—	—
SEL/SHL totals			219	3	9	12	97	29	0	2	2	8
Allsv totals			278	34	50	84	201	44	7	12	19	24

=== International ===
Year	Team	Event	GP	G	A	Pts	PIM
2002	Sweden	WJC18	8	0	0	0	2
2004	Sweden	WJC	6	0	2	2	2
Junior totals			14	0	2	2	4
