= Nicklas Jadeland =

Swedish ice hockey player (born 1986)

- Born: May 13, 1986 (age 39) Malmö, Sweden
- Height: 1.80 m (5 ft 11 in)
- Weight: 84 kg (185 lb; 13 st 3 lb)
- Position: Winger
- Shoots: Left
- Allsv team Former teams: IK Pantern; Malmö Redhawks
- Playing career: 2004–present

Nicklas Jadeland (born 13 May 1986) is a retired Swedish professional ice hockey player. He played for IK Pantern in the Hockeytrean after previously playing with the Malmö Redhawks in the Swedish Hockey League (SHL).
