= Jeremias Augustin =

Swedish ice hockey player

- Born: November 10, 1985 (age 40) Växjö, Sweden
- Height: 6 ft 0 in (183 cm)
- Weight: 198 lb (90 kg; 14 st 2 lb)
- Position: Defence
- Shot: Left
- Played for: Växjö Lakers; Malmö Redhawks
- NHL draft: Undrafted
- Playing career: 2003–2016

Jeremias Augustin (born November 10, 1985) is a Swedish former professional ice hockey defenceman.

== Career statistics ==
			Regular season					Playoffs
Season	Team	League	GP	G	A	Pts	PIM	GP	G	A	Pts	PIM
2002–03	Växjö Lakers HC	Division 1	—	2	1	3	—	9	0	0	0	2
2003–04	Växjö Lakers HC	Allsvenskan	35	1	0	1	2	—	—	—	—	—
2004–05	Växjö Lakers HC	Allsvenskan	29	1	1	2	4	2	0	0	0	0
2004–05	Osby IK	Division 1	11	3	3	6	12	—	—	—	—	—
2005–06	Växjö Lakers HC	HockeyAllsvenskan	41	2	0	2	20	—	—	—	—	—
2005–06	Osby IK	Division 1	5	0	0	0	4	—	—	—	—	—
2006–07	Växjö Lakers HC	HockeyAllsvenskan	44	1	2	3	22	3	0	0	0	4
2007–08	Växjö Lakers HC	HockeyAllsvenskan	36	1	4	5	20	3	1	0	1	0
2008–09	Växjö Lakers HC	HockeyAllsvenskan	41	2	5	7	42	10	1	1	2	0
2009–10	Växjö Lakers HC	HockeyAllsvenskan	43	0	3	3	28	10	1	1	2	6
2010–11	Växjö Lakers HC	HockeyAllsvenskan	42	0	5	5	22	7	0	1	1	4
2011–12	Växjö Lakers HC	Elitserien	54	2	0	2	30	—	—	—	—	—
2012–13	Växjö Lakers HC	Elitserien	53	1	5	6	8	—	—	—	—	—
2013–14	Växjö Lakers HC	SHL	40	0	0	0	22	1	0	0	0	0
2014–15	Malmö Redhawks	HockeyAllsvenskan	51	1	3	4	37	10	1	1	2	2
2015–16	Malmö Redhawks	SHL	48	0	3	3	22	—	—	—	—	—
SHL (Elitserien) totals			195	3	8	11	82	1	0	0	0	0
HockeyAllsvenskan totals			298	7	22	29	191	43	4	4	8	16
