= Henrik Hetta =

Swedish ice hockey player

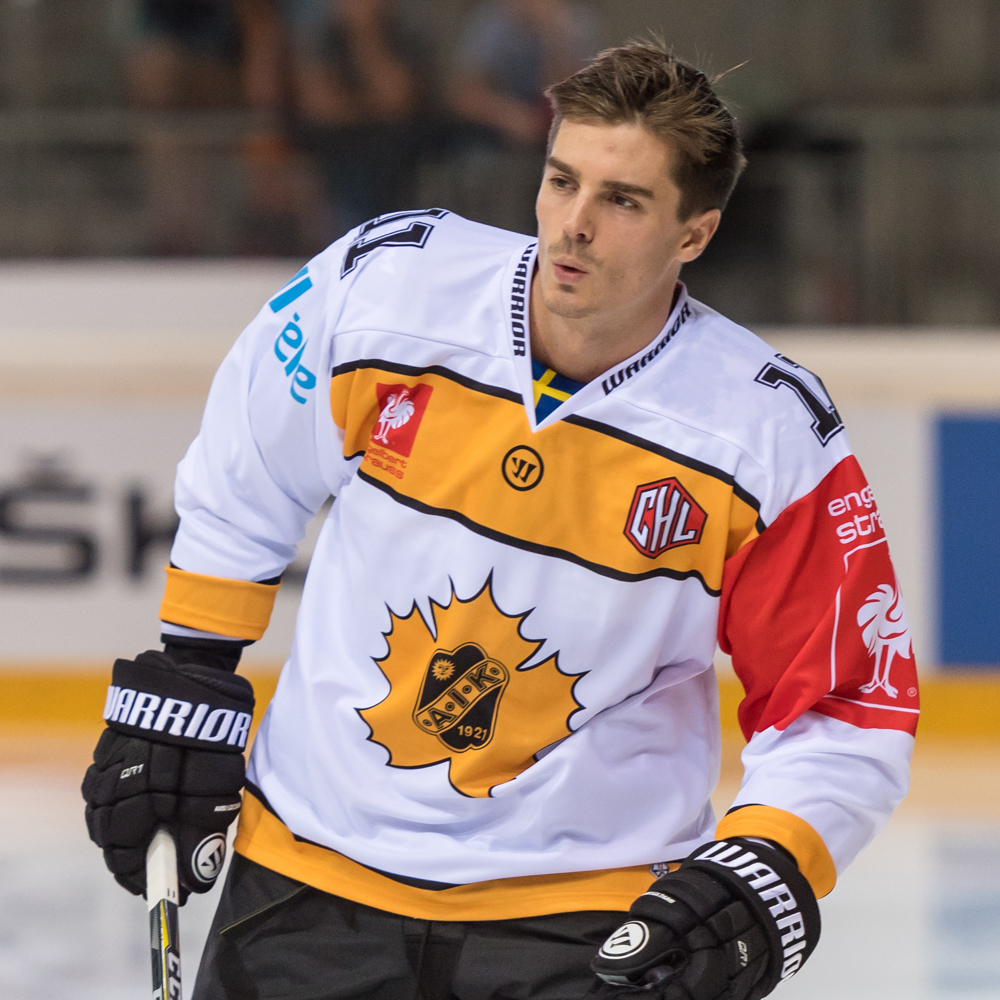
- Born: August 17, 1989 (age 36) Strömsund, Sweden
- Height: 6 ft 1 in (185 cm)
- Weight: 207 lb (94 kg; 14 st 11 lb)
- Position: Left wing
- Shot: Left
- Playing career: 2007–2022

Henrik Hetta (born 17 August 1989) is a Swedish former professional ice hockey player.

== Playing career ==
Hetta began his professional career with Östersunds IK in the Swedish Division 1, the third tier of professional hockey in Sweden.

In 2011-12 he played for Malmö Redhawks head coach Mats Lusth with the Division 1 club Olofströms IK Hetta played well for Lusth at the time and when Lusth moved to Malmö in 2012–13 Hetta was offered a tryout contract by the Redhawks. Hetta was successful with his tryout contract and was offered a two-year contract by Malmö which was signed January 4, 2013.

Hetta played two seasons with Skellefteå AIK in the SHL before leaving as a free agent following the 2017–18 season. On 8 May 2018, Hetta opted to return for a second tenure with the Malmö Redhawks, agreeing to a two-year contract.

== Career statistics ==
			Regular season					Playoffs
Season	Team	League	GP	G	A	Pts	PIM	GP	G	A	Pts	PIM
2007–08	Östersunds IK	Div.1	16	1	1	2	2	—	—	—	—	—
2007–08	Brunflo IK	Div.2	14	14	19	33	8	—	—	—	—	—
2008–09	Östersunds IK	Div.1	36	18	20	38	36	—	—	—	—	—
2009–10	Östersunds IK	Div.1	33	20	35	55	35	—	—	—	—	—
2010–11	Asplöven HC	Div.1	38	16	36	52	12	10	1	2	3	2
2011–12	Olofströms IK	Div.1	40	13	17	30	28	10	8	2	10	0
2012–13	Malmö Redhawks	Allsv	50	12	9	21	14	—	—	—	—	—
2013–14	Malmö Redhawks	Allsv	52	16	15	31	12	10	0	4	4	2
2014–15	Malmö Redhawks	Allsv	51	12	14	26	32	12	1	4	5	0
2015–16	Malmö Redhawks	SHL	40	3	7	10	31	—	—	—	—	—
2016–17	Skellefteå AIK	SHL	44	5	7	12	10	7	1	0	1	2
2017–18	Skellefteå AIK	SHL	50	9	4	13	14	16	2	2	4	31
2018–19	Malmö Redhawks	SHL	49	7	7	14	33	5	0	1	1	4
2019–20	Malmö Redhawks	SHL	48	2	6	8	37	—	—	—	—	—
2020-21	Västerås IK	Allsvenskan	52	7	13	20	10	6	1	1	2	8
2021-22	Rungsted Seier Capital	Metal Ligaen	37	16	9	25	39	5	2	2	4	2
SHL totals			231	26	31	57	125	28	3	3	6	37
