= Nils Bergström (ice hockey) =

Swedish ice hockey player

- Born: March 7, 1985 (age 40) Östersund, Sweden
- Height: 6 ft 1 in (185 cm)
- Weight: 192 lb (87 kg; 13 st 10 lb)
- Position: Centre
- Shot: Left
- Played for: Elitserien; Rögle BK; HockeyAllsvenskan; Timrå IK; Malmö Redhawks
- Playing career: 2005–2018

Nils Bergström (born March 7, 1985) is a Swedish ice hockey player.

Bergström made his Elitserien (now the SHL) debut playing with Rögle BK during the 2012–13 Elitserien season.

== Career statistics ==
			Regular season					Playoffs
Season	Team	League	GP	G	A	Pts	PIM	GP	G	A	Pts	PIM
2002–03	IF Vallentuna BK J20	J20 Elit	23	8	6	14	30	—	—	—	—	—
2003–04	Skellefteå AIK J20	J20 Elit	—	—	—	—	—	—	—	—	—	—
2004–05	Skellefteå AIK J20	J20 SuperElit	32	11	13	24	74	—	—	—	—	—
2004–05	Skellefteå AIK	Allsvenskan	6	0	0	0	0	—	—	—	—	—
2004–05	Clemensnäs HC	Division 1	2	1	2	3	4	—	—	—	—	—
2005–06	Brunflo IK	Division 1	34	16	29	45	54	—	—	—	—	—
2006–07	Kristianstads IK	Division 1	8	1	1	2	18	—	—	—	—	—
2006–07	Östersund/Brunflo IF	Division 1	28	10	18	28	30	—	—	—	—	—
2007–08	Östersund/Brunflo IF	Division 1	33	19	20	39	58	—	—	—	—	—
2008–09	HC Eppan Pirates	Italy2	37	22	22	44	46	—	—	—	—	—
2009–10	Östersund/Brunflo IF	Division 1	35	28	45	73	86	—	—	—	—	—
2010–11	Rögle BK	HockeyAllsvenskan	52	3	12	15	44	10	0	0	0	0
2011–12	Rögle BK	HockeyAllsvenskan	50	4	11	15	16	10	3	4	7	6
2012–13	Rögle BK	Elitserien	33	2	1	3	12	—	—	—	—	—
2012–13	Karlskrona HK	HockeyAllsvenskan	18	3	6	9	38	—	—	—	—	—
2013–14	Timrå IK	HockeyAllsvenskan	49	9	17	26	38	—	—	—	—	—
2014–15	Malmö Redhawks	HockeyAllsvenskan	36	1	2	3	16	—	—	—	—	—
2015–16	Östersunds IK	Hockeyettan	35	12	26	38	69	1	0	1	1	12
2016–17	Östersunds IK	Hockeyettan	35	9	22	31	40	—	—	—	—	—
2017–18	Östersunds IK	Hockeyettan	31	10	9	19	28	3	1	1	2	0
Elitserien totals			33	2	1	3	12	—	—	—	—	—
HockeyAllsvenskan totals			205	20	48	68	152	20	3	4	7	6
Hockeyettan (Division 1) totals			241	106	172	278	387	4	1	2	3	12
