= Mattias Persson =

Swedish ice hockey player

- Born: April 9, 1985 (age 41) Bohus-Malmön, Sweden
- Height: 5 ft 10 in (178 cm)
- Weight: 183 lb (83 kg; 13 st 1 lb)
- Position: Forward
- Shoots: Left
- Metal Ligaen team Former teams: Rungsted Seier Capital; Malmö Redhawks
- NHL draft: Undrafted
- Playing career: 2008–present

Mattias Persson (born April 9, 1985) is a Swedish professional ice hockey player. He currently plays for Rungsted Seier Capital of the Metal Ligaen.
