= Christoffer Forsberg =

Swedish ice hockey player

- Born: March 31, 1994 (age 31) Östersund, Sweden
- Height: 5 ft 11 in (180 cm)
- Weight: 185 lb (84 kg; 13 st 3 lb)
- Position: Centre
- Shoots: Left
- Liiga team Former teams: Lahti Pelicans; Färjestad BK; Malmö Redhawks
- Playing career: 2013–present

Christoffer Forsberg (born March 31, 1994) is a Swedish ice hockey player. He is currently playing with Lahti Pelicans of the Liiga.

Forsberg made his Swedish Hockey League debut playing with Färjestad BK during the 2013–14 SHL season. Forsberg played 11 seasons with the Malmö Redhawks before leaving the SHL to sign a two-year contract with Finnish club, Lahti Pelicans of the Liiga, on 26 July 2025.
