= Jens Jakobs =

Swedish ice hockey player (born 1985)

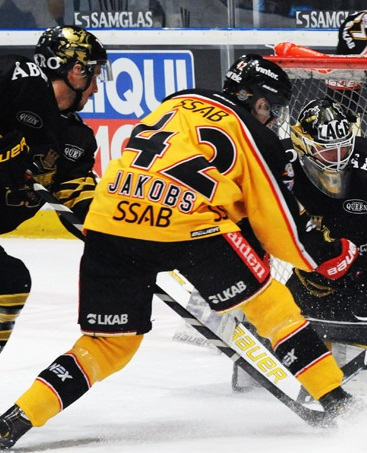
- Cropped photo of Jens Jakobs, forward of Luleå HF, during a Swedish Elite League ice hockey game against AIK inside Hovet.
- Born: March 5, 1985 (age 41) Säter, Sweden
- Height: 5 ft 9 in (175 cm)
- Weight: 176 lb (80 kg; 12 st 8 lb)
- Position: Right wing
- Shoots: Right
- Hockeyettan team Former teams: IK Pantern; Mora IK; Almtuna IS; Nyköpings Hockey; Luleå HF; Leksands IF; Djurgårdens IF; Malmö Redhawks; Linköpings HC; AIK IF; Storhamar Ishockey; Almtuna IS; Nottingham Panthers
- NHL draft: Undrafted
- Playing career: 2003–present

Jens Jakobs (born March 5, 1985) is a Swedish ice hockey player.

Jakobs made his Elitserien debut playing with Mora IK during the 2005–06 season.
