= Kim Rosdahl =

Swedish ice hockey player

- Born: May 12, 1996 (age 29) Malmö, Sweden
- Height: 6 ft 3 in (191 cm)
- Weight: 203 lb (92 kg; 14 st 7 lb)
- Position: Left wing
- Shoots: Right
- Allsv team Former teams: Västerås IK; Malmö Redhawks; IK Oskarshamn; Rögle BK
- Playing career: 2013–present

Kim Rosdahl (born 12 May 1996) is a Swedish professional ice hockey winger. He is currently playing with Västerås IK in the HockeyAllsvenskan (Allsv). He has previously played with Malmö Redhawks IK Oskarshamn and Rögle BK in the Swedish Hockey League (SHL).
