= Jens Olsson (ice hockey) =

Swedish ice hockey player (born 1984)

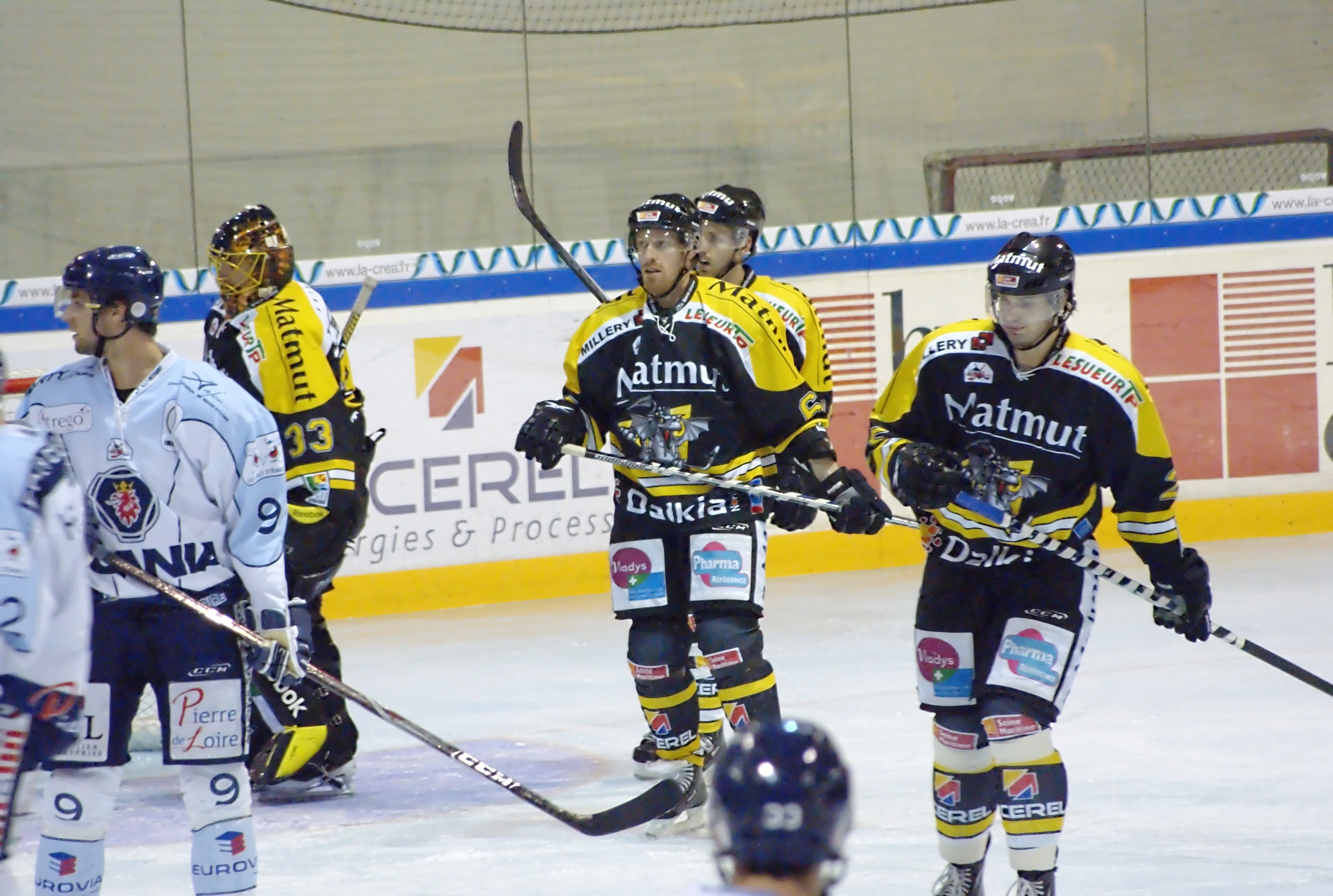
- Born: 9 December 1984 (age 41) Malmö, Sweden
- Height: 6 ft 0 in (183 cm)
- Weight: 190 lb (86 kg; 13 st 8 lb)
- Position: Defence
- Shoots: Left
- Slovak team Former teams: HC Košice; Malmö Redhawks; Södertälje SK; Dragons de Rouen; EHC München; Genève-Servette HC; HC TPS; Frölunda HC
- Playing career: 2003–present

Jens Olsson (born 9 December 1984) is a Swedish professional ice hockey defenceman who is currently playing for HC Košice of the Slovak Extraliga.

== Playing career ==
On September 25, 2019, Olsson joined Genève-Servette HC on a one-year deal as a replacement for injured Henrik Tömmernes. He played 7 games (1 assist) following his arrival before being sent to the stands as a healthy scratch.

On October 28, 2019, Olsson was released by Genève-Servette after only a month.

== Career statistics ==
=== Regular season and playoffs ===
| | | | Regular season | | | | | Playoffs |
| Season | Team | League | GP | G | A | Pts | PIM | GP | G | A | Pts | PIM |
|---|---|---|---|---|---|---|---|---|---|---|---|---|
| 2022–23 | HC Košice | Slovak | 50 | 4 | 17 | 21 | 30 | 17 | 2 | 5 | 7 | 8 |
| SHL totals | | | 499 | 31 | 77 | 108 | 227 | 61 | 3 | 11 | 14 | 30 |

== Awards and honors ==
| Award | Year |
Slovak
| Champion | 2023 |
