= Johan Ivarsson (ice hockey) =

Swedish ice hockey player

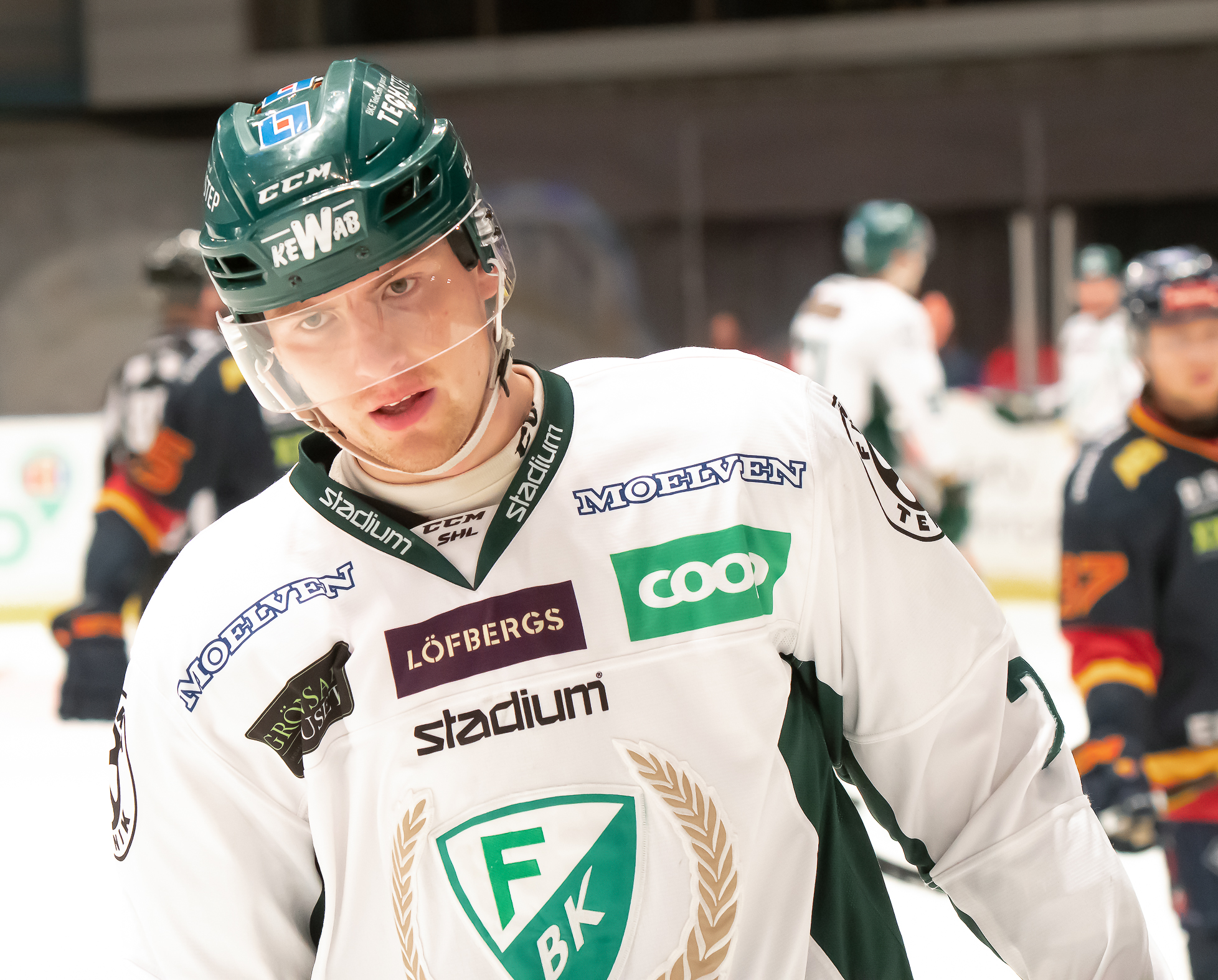
- Ivarsson in 2019
- Born: July 6, 1995 (age 30) Höör, Sweden
- Height: 6 ft 2 in (188 cm)
- Weight: 194 lb (88 kg; 13 st 12 lb)
- Position: Defence
- Shoots: Left
- SHL team Former teams: Malmö Redhawks; Färjestad BK; HC TPS
- Playing career: 2014–present

Johan Ivarsson (born 6 July 1995) is a Swedish professional ice hockey defenceman. He is currently playing for Malmö Redhawks of the Swedish Hockey League (SHL). He previously has played in the SHL with Färjestad BK.
