= 2011–12 Malmö Redhawks season =

Swedish ice hockey club season

2011–12 Malmö Redhawks
- League: 7th HockeyAllsvenskan
- 2011–12 record: 22–21–9
- Home record: 13–8–5
- Road record: 9–13–4
- Goals for: 139
- Goals against: 140

Team information
- General manager: Stefan Nyman
- Coach: Ulf Taavola
- Assistant coach: Patrik Sylvegård
- Captain: Linus Klasen
- Alternate captains: Morten Green; Robin Alvarez
- Arena: Malmö Arena
- Average attendance: 6,072

Team leaders
- Goals: Linus Klasen (20)
- Assists: Linus Klasen (30)
- Points: Linus Klasen (50)
- Penalty minutes: J-L. Grand-Pierre (91)
- Wins: Pontus Sjögren (21)
- Goals against average: Pontus Sjögren (2.24)

The 2011–12 Malmö Redhawks season was the Redhawks' 5th consecutive season in the HockeyAllsvenskan ice hockey league, the second tier of Swedish elite hockey. The regular season began on 17 September 2011 away against Mora IK, and concluded on 2 March 2012 away against Almtuna IS. The Playoff round began on 4 March and ended on 12 March 2012. The season saw Malmö Redhawks attempting to reach the Kvalserien qualification for Elitserien, after businessman Hugo Stenbeck bought the Redhawks in January 2011.

The Redhawks finished 7th in the league and qualified for the Playoff round, where they finished 2nd and failed to qualify for the 2012 Kvalserien for Elitserien.

== Summary ==
The Redhawks started the season with eight pre-season games against professional teams from Norway and Germany as well as Sweden. Malmö went 5–2–1 in those eight games (5 wins, 2 losses, 1 tie).

The regular season began pretty well. With 29 points and a top 3 spot in the first two months, everything seemed to be going as intended as the Redhawks fought for a direct spot to the 2012 Kvalserien. However, after only getting 18 points in November, as well as beginning December with three consecutive losses, Malmö jumped down to a spot below top 7, which would have been required to even guarantee a playoff spot. Malmö had enough of then head coach Leif Strömberg, who was fired from the club on 10 December as a result. Ulf Taavola, at that time assistant coach for the team, took over the head-coaching job and Patrik Sylvegård entered the team as new assistant coach.

Malmö continued to struggle for a playoff spot throughout January, despite getting 10 points that month, five more than the previous month. The team improved sharply in February, posting 16 points in seven games. As a result, Malmö returned to a playoff spot. In the two last games of February, Malmö had their chance to secure a spot in the playoffs with a win, but failed. As a result, the Redhawks were forced to win the last game of the season, which was against Almtuna. The game was a nail-biter for 59 minutes, but with just one minute left on the clock, Malmö captain Linus Klasen scored the only goal of the game to send the Redhawks to the Playoff round.

The Playoff round started well, but because Malmö only received one extra point due to the 7th seed in the regular season, the Redhawks were two points outside the spot for the 2012 Kvalserien going into the final game. While Malmö won their game 4–1, Rögle won their game 7–0 and took the Kvalserien spot due to better goal difference than Malmö, ending the Redhawks' 2011–12 season.

== Schedule and results ==
"@" indicates that the game was played on away ice.

=== Pre-season ===
2011 pre-season game log: 5–2–1 (home: 1–2–0; road: 4–0–1)
August 11 – September 11

#	Date	Opponent	Score	Decision	Record
1	August 11	Sparta Sarpsborg	4-0	Toivonen	1–0–0
2	August 12	@ SønderjyskE	3-2	Toivonen	2–0–0
3	August 20	@ Växjö Lakers	2-2	Toivonen	2–0–1
4	August 24	@ Sparta Sarpsborg	4-1	Sjögren	3–0–1
5	August 26	Hamburg Freezers	1-3	Toivonen	3–1–1
6	September 3	@ Hannover Scorpions	5-2	Sjögren	4–1–1
7	September 8	Växjö Lakers	1-2	Toivonen	4–2–1
8	September 11	@ Hamburg Freezers	5-3	Sjögren	5–2–1

Legend: Win Overtime win Loss Tie |}

=== Regular season ===
Pos	Team	Pld	W	OTW	OTL	L	GF	GA	GD	Pts	Qualification
4	VIK Västerås	52	29	1	6	16	157	116	+41	95	Advance to pre-qualifiers
5	Rögle BK	52	21	7	8	16	171	150	+21	85	Advance to pre-qualifiers
6	IK Oskarshamn	52	23	4	5	20	146	145	+1	82	Advance to pre-qualifiers
7	Malmö Redhawks	52	22	6	3	21	139	140	−1	81	Advance to pre-qualifiers
8	Mora IK	52	22	5	4	21	168	144	+24	80	
9	Södertälje SK	52	22	2	6	22	110	120	−10	76	
10	IF Troja/Ljungby	52	19	4	4	25	134	154	−20	69	

2011-12 Game Log: 22–21–9, 81 Points (home: 13–8–5; road: 9–13–4)
September: 5-1-0, 15 Points (home: 2-1-0; road: 3-0-0)

Game	September	Opponent	Score	Decision	Record
1	17	@ Mora	4-3	Toivonen	1-0-0
2	19	Bofors	5-0	Sjögren	2-0-0
3	24	Västerås	2-6	Toivonen	2-1-0
4	26	@ Rögle	5-2	Sjögren	3-1-0
5	28	Tingsryd	4-1	Sjögren	4-1-0
6	30	@ Sundsvall	3-2	Sjögren	5-1-0

October: 4-3-1, 14 Points (home: 3-0-1; road: 1-3-0)

Game	October	Opponent	Score	Decision	Record
7	5	@ Leksand	3-1	Toivonen	6-1-0
8	7	@ Troja/Ljungby	2-4	Toivonen	6-2-0
9	10	Oskarshamn	6-2	Sjögren	7-2-0
10	14	@ Örebro	3-6	Sjögren	7-3-0
11	19	Södertälje	3-2 SO	Toivonen	7-3-1
12	22	Borås	4-2	Toivonen	8-3-1
13	26	Almtuna	3-0	Toivonen	9-3-1
14	28	@ Bofors	2-3	Sjögren	9-4-1

November: 5-5-2, 18 Points (home: 3-2-1; road: 2-3-1)

Game	November	Opponent	Score	Decision	Record
15	2	Rögle	2-4	Toivonen	9-5-1
16	4	@ Tingsryd	3-4	Toivonen	9-6-1
17	6	Sundsvall	3-4 SO	Sjögren	9-6-2
18	8	Leksand	3-1	Sjögren	10-6-2
19	10	@ Västerås	1-4	Sjögren	10-7-2
20	14	Troja/Ljungby	3-2	Sjögren	11-7-2
21	16	@ Oskarshamn	4-3 SO	Sjögren	11-7-3
22	18	Örebro	5-4	Toivonen	12-7-3
23	21	@ Södertälje	1-4	Toivonen	12-8-3
24	24	@ Borås	3-1	Sjögren	13-8-3
25	26	Mora	2-5	Sjögren	13-9-3
26	30	@ Almtuna	4-1	Sjögren	14-9-3

December: 1-6-1, 5 Points (home: 1-3-0; road: 0-3-1)

Game	December	Opponent	Score	Decision	Record
27	2	@ Bofors	2-5	Sjögren	14-10-3
28	6	Västerås	0-2	Sjögren	14-11-3
29	8	@ Rögle	2-4	Sjögren	14-12-3
30	10	Tingsryd	1-2	Sjögren	14-13-3
31	14	@ Sundsvall	4-3 SO	Sjögren	14-13-4
32	19	Leksand	1-2	Sjögren	14-14-4
33	27	@ Troja/Ljungby	1-3	Sjögren	14-15-4
34	29	Oskarshamn	5-2	Toivonen	15-15-4

January: 2-3-3, 10 Points (home: 2-1-2; road: 0-2-1)

Game	January	Opponent	Score	Decision	Record
35	6	@ Örebro	1-2	Toivonen	15-16-4
36	8	Södertälje	2-3 SO	Toivonen	15-16-5
37	14	Borås	4-5	Toivonen	15-17-5
38	16	Almtuna	3-2	Sjögren	16-17-5
39	18	@ Mora	4-5 OT	Toivonen	16-17-6
40	25	Bofors	2-1	Sjögren	17-17-6
41	28	@ Västerås	2-5	Sjögren	17-18-6
42	30	Rögle	3-2 SO	Sjögren	17-18-7

February: 4-3-2, 16 Points (home: 2-1-1; road: 2-2-1)

Game	February	Opponent	Score	Decision	Record
43	1	@ Tingsryd	3-0	Sjögren	18-18-7
44	3	Sundsvall	2-1	Sjögren	19-18-7
45	6	@ Leksand	0-6	Toivonen	19-19-7
46	15	Troja/Ljungby	3-1	Sjögren	20-19-7
47	17	@ Oskarshamn	3-2 SO	Sjögren	20-19-8
48	19	Örebro	2-1 OT	Sjögren	20-19-9
49	24	@ Södertälje	3-2	Sjögren	21-19-9
50	27	@ Borås	1-4	Sjögren	21-20-9
51	29	Mora	1-4	Sjögren	21-21-9

March: 1-0-0, 3 Points (Road: 1-0-0)

Game	March	Opponent	Score	Decision	Record
52	2	@ Almtuna	1-0	Sjögren	22-21-9

Legend: Win (3 points) Overtime/Shootout win (2 points) Loss (0 points) Overtime/Shootout loss (1 point) |}

=== Playoff round ===
In the Playoff round, the 4th seed starts at four points, the 5th seed at three points, the 6th seed at two points, and the 7th seed at one point. As Malmö were the 7th-seeded team, they started at one point. The top team after six rounds advances to the 2012 Kvalserien.

Pos	Team	Pld	W	OTW/SOW	OTL/SOL	L	GF	GA	GD	BP	Pts
1	Rögle BK	6	2	2	0	2	22	14	+8	3	13
2	Malmö Redhawks	6	4	0	0	2	19	13	+6	1	13
3	IK Oskarshamn	6	3	0	1	2	11	17	−6	2	12
4	VIK Västerås	6	1	0	1	4	13	21	−8	4	8

Playoff game log: 4–2–0 (home: 1-2-0; road: 3-0-0)
March

Game	March	Opponent	Score	Decision	Record
1	4	Västerås	3-5	Sjögren	0–1–0
2	6	@ Rögle	3-1	Sjögren	1-1-0
3	7	@ Oskarshamn	4-2	Sjögren	2-1-0
4	9	Oskarshamn	0-1	Sjögren	2-2-0
5	11	Rögle	5-3	Sjögren	3-2-0
6	12	@ Västerås	4-1	Sjögren	4–2–0

=== Statistics ===
==== Players ====
Player	Team	GP	G	A	+/–	PIM	Pts

==== Goaltenders ====
Player	GP	TOI	SOG	GA	SO	GAA	SV%
(Sweden) Pontus Sjögren	36	2092:02	1020	78	3	2.24	92.35%
(Finland) Hannu Toivonen	19	1054:00	550	58	1	3.30	89.45%

== Final roster ==
No.	Nat	Player	Pos	S/G	Age	Acquired	Birthplace
40	(Sweden)	Pontus Sjögren	G	L	40	2011	Stockholm, Sweden
28	(Finland)	Hannu Toivonen	G	L	41	2011	Kalvola, Finland
3	(Sweden)	Robin Weihager	D	R	37	2009	Hässleholm, Sweden
6	(Sweden)	Emil Carnestad	D	L	33	2010	
23	(United States)	J. D. Forrest	D	L	44	2011	Auburn, New York
34	(Canada)	Jean-Luc Grand-Pierre	D	R	49	2011	Montreal, Quebec
74	(Sweden)	Tim Heed	D	R	35	2011	Gothenburg, Sweden
5	(Sweden)	Marcus Högström	D	L	37	2012	Sveg, Sweden
22	(Sweden)	Daniel Josefsson	D	L	44	2011	Tranås, Sweden
77	(Sweden)	Alexander Ribbenstrand	D	L	39	2011	Stockholm, Sweden
14	(Denmark)	Stefan Lassen	D	L	40	2011	Herning, Denmark
13	(Denmark)	Morten Green (A)	F	L	45	2009	Hørsholm, Denmark
16	(Sweden)	Magnus Häggström	W	R	39	2012	Örnsköldsvik, Sweden
86	(Sweden)	Linus Klasen (C)	W	L	40	2011	Stockholm, Sweden
29	(Sweden)	Tomas Kollar	W	L	43	2011	Stockholm, Sweden
4	(Sweden)	Roger Ohlsson	C	L	34	2007	Malmö, Sweden
15	(Germany)	Alexander Barta	C	R	43	2011	West Berlin
53	(Sweden)	Lukas Eriksson	C	L	37	2011	Karlstad, Sweden
71	(Sweden)	Pathrik Westerholm	C/LW	L	34	2008	Karlskrona, Sweden
21	(Sweden)	Jesper Mattsson	C/RW	R	50	2011	Malmö, Sweden
10	(Sweden)	Robin Alvarez (A)	LW	L	38	2004	Malmö, Sweden
11	(Sweden)	Robert Carlsson	LW	L	48	2011	Södertälje, Sweden
84	(Sweden)	Dragan Umicevic	RW	R	41	2011	Dubica, Bosnia and Herzegovina
17	(Sweden)	Ponthus Westerholm	RW	R	34	2008	Karlskrona, Sweden
7	(Slovakia)	Ivan Čiernik	RW	L	48	2011	Levice, Slovakia
81	(Slovakia)	Miroslav Lažo	RW	R	48	2011	Bratislava, Slovakia
