= Dubuque Fighting Saints =

American junior ice hockey team

- City: Dubuque, Iowa
- League: USHL
- Conference: East
- Founded: 2010
- Home arena: ImOn Arena
- Colors: Red, white
- Owners: Northern Lights Hockey, LLC (Brad Kwong, managing partner)
- General manager: Trevor Edwards (since 2024)
- Head coach: Evan Dixon (since 2024)
- Media: Telegraph Herald, KXGE, KCRG-TV, KWWL

Franchise history
- 2010–present: Dubuque Fighting Saints

Championships
- Regular season titles: Anderson Cup; 1 (2012–13)
- Conference titles: 4 (2010–11, 2012–13, 2015–16, 2023–24)
- Playoff championships: Clark Cup; 2 (2010–11, 2012–13)

The Dubuque Fighting Saints are a junior ice hockey team playing in the United States Hockey League (USHL) and are based in the city of Dubuque, Iowa, on the banks of the Mississippi River at the intersection of Iowa, Illinois, and Wisconsin. Home games are played at the ImOn Arena (capacity: 3,079).

== History ==
=== Re-establishment of the Fighting Saints and early success ===
The original Dubuque Fighting Saints played at the multi-purpose Dubuque Five Flags Center arena situated in downtown Dubuque from 1980 to 2001. In the early years of the franchise the Saints enjoyed much success with a number of championship seasons. In later years, the team struggled on the ice and crowds in the stands decreased putting the team into some financial trouble. During the 2000–01 season, team owner/GM/coach Brain Gallagher announced plans to relocate the team following the season to Tulsa, Oklahoma to play as the Tulsa Crude. In their first and only season in Tulsa, Gallagher's team would finish last in the league (12–43–6) and failed to generate the necessary fan support, and the franchise ceased operations.

To replace the hockey void in Dubuque, the Fighting Saints were replaced in the 2001–02 season by the Dubuque Thunderbirds in the Tier III Minnesota Junior Hockey League and later the Central States Hockey League. The Thunderbirds would prove to be a success and would win league championships in 2004, 2007, 2008, and 2009 while setting league attendance records along the way.

In the fall of 2009, construction began on the new Mystique Community Ice Center. Around that same time several former hockey teammates from Harvard formed Northern Lights Hockey, LLC. which included former team captain, Brad Kwong; Philip Falcone (part owner of NHL's Minnesota Wild); Peter Chiarelli (a general manager for the NHL's Boston Bruins and Edmonton Oilers); and former University of Denver player Mark Falcone (board member of the NHL's Minnesota Wild). The purpose of their group was to assemble and develop plans to obtain ownership of an USHL expansion team, announcing in late 2009 their intentions to bring USHL hockey back to Dubuque. The new team replaced the successful Dubuque Thunderbirds in 2010. After completion of voting from local hockey fans, it was revealed that the "Fighting Saints" moniker would once again represent Dubuque in the USHL.

In their first year back in the USHL for the 2010–11 season, the Saints would inaugurate the brand new Mystique Community Ice Center with Dubuque native Brooks Bertsch scoring the first goal. The expansion Fighting Saints had a successful season compiling a 37–14–9 record and taking first place in the Western Conference. The Saints would earn a 9–2 playoff record, defeating the Fargo Force 3-games-to-0 in the quarterfinals, Sioux Falls Stampede 3-games-to-1 in the semifinals, and defeating the defending Clark Cup Champion Green Bay Gamblers 3-games-to-1 in the best-of-five USHL Clark Cup championship series. Saints LW Rookie Johnny Gaudreau was recognized as the USHL Rookie of the Year and Jim Montgomery was recognized as the USHL General Manager of the Year.

In the 2011–12 season, the Saints were moved to the Eastern Conference. The defending champions would finish in third place with a 36–20–4 record and claim the inaugural "Cowbell Cup". They would go on to win the opening best-of-three qualifying round of the playoffs 2-games-to-0 over Team USA. The Saints were then swept in the best-of-five quarterfinals by the Indiana Ice.

The Fighting Saints would roll through the 2012–13 season with a 45–11–8 record, finishing first in the Eastern Conference and the overall league leaders, securing their first Anderson Cup regular season championship since the former Saints in the 1982–83 season, and repeat as Cowbell Cup champions. After securing a bye for the qualifying round, the Saints skated to a 3-games-to-0 quarterfinals win over the Muskegon Lumberjacks. The Youngstown Phantoms took Dubuque to a decisive fifth game in the Clark Cup semifinals, with the Saints advancing with the win. In the Clark Cup finals, the Saints would seal the championship with a win on the road, taking down the Fargo Force 3-games-to-0. Dan Lehv was recognized as the USHL Executive of the Year and Jim Montgomery was once again recognized as the USHL General Manager of the Year. Montgomery had served as the team's head coach and general manager from 2010 through the end of the 2012–13 season. In May 2013, Matt Shaw was hired as head coach and GM to replace Montgomery who was hired as head coach of the University of Denver Pioneers.

Prior to the start of the 2013–14 season, first-year coach Shaw and the Saints were invited to play in the Junior Club World Cup in Omsk, Russia, finishing with the bronze medal. Returning home, the defending champions skated to a 33–23–4 regular season record, finishing third in the Eastern Conference and qualifying for the postseason for the fourth time in four years. Prior to the start of the season, the USHL reduced the number of playoff teams from each conference from 6 to 4, eliminating the opening qualifying round. In the playoffs, the Saints would face-off in the quarterfinals against the Cedar Rapids RoughRiders for the first time and would win the series 3-games-to-1. The Saints were then swept out of the semifinals by the eventual Clark Cup Champion Indiana Ice, 3-games-to-0.

The Saints finished the 2014–15 regular season in third place in the Eastern Conference with a 36–19–5 record. For the fifth straight year since returning to the USHL, they qualified for the Clark Cup playoffs, extending the longest active playoff streak in the league. The Saints also claimed their third "Cowbell Cup" in the Prairie Farms Cowbell Cup Series over Cedar Rapids and Waterloo. The playoff quarterfinals pitted the Saints in a 2014 quarterfinals rematch against rival Cedar Rapids, a team that Dubuque had a 6–2 regular season record against. Dubuque would sweep Cedar Rapids 3-games-to-0 in the best-of-five series to move on. The best-of-five semifinals pitted Dubuque against the Muskegon Lumberjacks. In a back and forth five-game series with neither team notching back-to-back wins, Muskegon would prevail in game 5 by holding off a late game rally for the 3–4 win and take the series. Following the season, head coach Matt Shaw announced that he would be leaving the Saints after accepting a position as an assistant coach at the University of North Dakota.

The Saints under direction of first year coach Jason Lammers, finished the 2015–16 regular season in third place in the Eastern Conference. For the sixth straight year, the Saints qualified for a spot in the Clark Cup playoffs, further extending the longest active playoff streak in the league. Each of the four Eastern Conference playoff teams finished the season with better records than all teams in the Western Conference, gaining the eventual Eastern Conference champions a guaranteed home-ice advantage in the finals. In the quarterfinals, the Saints would close out a 3-games-to-1 series win against the second seeded Green Bay Gamblers. In the Eastern Conference finals, Dubuque took the first of a back and forth series against the Bloomington Thunder and took the series to game five at home in Dubuque, prevailing in a 3–0 shutout to earn a spot and home-ice advantage in the Clark Cup finals. Even with the home-ice advantage, the Fighting Saints would be swept in three games in the finals by the Tri-City Storm. Following the season, Saints net-minder Hunter Miska was recognized by USA Hockey as the Dave Peterson Goalie of the Year.

The Saints finished the 2016–17 regular season in second place in the Eastern Conference with forward Zach Solow garnering the USHL regular season scoring title. The Saints qualified for a spot in the Clark Cup playoffs a seventh straight year continuing the longest active playoff streak in the league. In the quarterfinals, the Saints faced the third seeded Muskegon Lumberjacks in a series with both teams almost statistically identical. Dubuque would skate to a 3-games-to-1 series win. The Saints faced off against top seeded Chicago in the Conference Finals. After splitting the first two games on the road, the Saints would be stopped in both games at home, dropping the series 3-games-to-1. Second year coach Jason Lammers announced that he would be accepting the head coaching position at Niagara University at the conclusion of the season. After leading the league in scoring, Saints forward Zach Solow was bestowed the Dave Tyler National Junior Player of the Year, the first Dubuque player to receive the honor.

In an injury-plagued 2017–18 regular season, the Saints finished in fifth place with 33 of 60 games being decided by a single point where they held a 14–19 record. Of the 33 single point games, 18 advanced to overtime, earning the Saints 18 bonus points in the standings, contributing to their fifth-place finish for the season. The Saints were 4–10 in games ending in overtime and 1–3 in games ending in a shootout. For the postseason, the USHL returned to an expanded playoff format with the top six teams in each conference qualifying for the Clark Cup playoffs, up from four in the previous seasons, allowing the Saints to earn a playoff berth for the eighth straight year, continuing the longest active streak. The best-of-three first round series had the Saints facing the fourth-seeded Green Bay Gamblers. The Saints swept the road series 2-games-to-none for their eighth consecutive year with a playoff series win, but were eliminated in the following round.

=== Expanded ownership ===
Prior to 2018–19 season, Philip Falcone sold his interest in Northern Lights Hockey to another group under the name Saints4Life Acquisitions, LLC. Saints4Life's investors were made up of many other individuals including Dan Bylsma, Johnny Gaudreau, Zemgus Girgensons, and Peter Luukko.

== Team colors and logo ==
The Fighting Saints team colors are red and white and a secondary color silver. Their main logo is a Gothic style D with a fleur-de-lis-hilted sword piercing the D and a halo on the top.

== Season records ==
Season	GP	W	L	OTL	SOL	Pts	GF	GA	PIM	Finish	Playoffs	Playoff record	Trophies
2010–11	60	37	14	9	—	83	195	152	961	1st, Western Conference	Quarterfinals (W) 3–0 vs Fargo; Semifinals (W) 3–1 vs Sioux Falls; Clark Cup Finals (W) 3–1 vs Green Bay	9–2	Clark Cup
2011–12	60	36	20	4	—	76	189	169	940	3rd, Eastern Conference	Qualifying round (W) 2–0 vs Team USA; Quarterfinals (L) 0–3 vs Indiana	2–3	Cowbell Cup
2012–13	64	45	11	8	—	98	247	154	1055	1st, Eastern Conference; League Champions	Quarterfinals (W) 3–0 vs Muskegon; Semifinals (W) 3–2 vs Youngstown; Clark Cup Finals (W) 3–0 vs Fargo	9–2	Clark Cup, Anderson Cup, Cowbell Cup
2013–14	60	33	23	4	—	70	201	186	957	3rd, Eastern Conference	Quarterfinals (W) 3–1 vs Cedar Rapids; Semifinals (L) 0–3 vs Indiana	3–4	
2014–15	60	36	19	5	—	77	207	167	1327	3rd, Eastern Conference	Quarterfinals (W) 3–0 vs Cedar Rapids; Semifinals (L) 2–3 vs Muskegon	5–3	Cowbell Cup
2015–16	60	39	19	1	1	80	209	159	1082	3rd, Eastern Conference	Quarterfinals (W) 3–1 vs Green Bay; Semifinals (W) 3–2 vs Bloomington; Clark Cup Finals (L) 0–3 vs Tri-City	6–6	Eastern Conference Champions
2016–17	60	36	17	5	2	79	201	163	1038	2nd, Eastern Conference	Quarterfinals (W) 3–1 vs Muskegon; Semifinals (L) 1–3 vs Chicago	4–4	
2017–18	60	26	21	10	3	65	179	194	606	5th, Eastern Conference	First Round (W) 2–0 vs Green Bay; Conf. Semifinals (L) 0–3 vs Youngstown	2–3	
2018–19	62	28	26	4	4	64	192	204	815	6th, Eastern Conference	First Round (W) 2–0 vs Youngstown; Conf. Semifinals (L) 1–3 vs Muskegon	3–3	
2019–20	48	33	13	2	0	68	180	123	588	2nd, Eastern Conference	Season cancelled due to COVID-19 pandemic	—	Cowbell Cup
2020–21	52	24	23	4	1	53	199	212	500	4th, Eastern Conference	Conf. Semifinals (L) 0–2 vs. Chicago	0–2	Cowbell Cup

=== Cowbell Cup Champions ===
Started in 2011–12 season and sponsored by Prairie Farms, the Cowbell Cup is awarded to the highest finisher in the "Cowbell Cup Regular Season Series" between the eastern Iowa USHL rivals; Cedar Rapids RoughRiders, Dubuque Fighting Saints, and Waterloo Blackhawks. At the start of the 2015–16 season, Dupaco Community Credit Union became the primary sponsor of the renamed "Dupaco Cowbell Cup". The Fighting Saints have won the Cowbell Cup in the following seasons:

- 2011–12
- 2012–13
- 2014–15
- 2019–20
- 2020–21

== Head coaches ==
- Jim Montgomery (2010–13): Assembling the new Fighting Saints was placed on shoulders of the new coach and general manager, Jim Montgomery. Montgomery was a standout at the University of Maine (301 points, 103 goals, 198 assists over 170 games) captaining 1992–93 NCAA Champions and was a finalist for the Hobey Baker Award before playing over a decade in the NHL. During Montgomery's three-year tenure at the helm, his teams was 118–45–21 in the regular season and 20–7 in three trips to the postseason winning two Clark Cup playoff championships and one Anderson Cup regular season championship. Montgomery was twice awarded the USHL's General Manager of the Year award. After three successful seasons with the Fighting Saints, Montgomery was hired to fill the head coaching position at the University of Denver Pioneers.
- Matt Shaw (2013–15): Came to Dubuque with 20 years of coaching experience including several coaching positions from 2007 to 2012 in the NHL. In his two seasons with the Saints, Shaw would guide the team to back-to-back Clark Cup semifinals appearances, with a 69–42–9 regular season record and notching an 8–7 playoff record. Shaw accepted a position as an assistant coach at the University of North Dakota following the 2014–15 season.
- Jason Lammers (2015–17): Arrived with 15 years of coaching experience after previously working in assistant and associate coaching positions at UMass Lowell, making four NCAA tournament appearances and advancing once to the Frozen Four. Prior to UMass, Shaw was an assistant coach at Colorado College and Ohio State. After two seasons, Lammers' Fighting Saints teams compiled a 75–36–9 record, reaching the conference finals twice and advancing once to the Clark Cup finals. During the 2017 Clark Cup playoffs it was announced that coach Lammers would be filling the head coaching position at Niagara University following the season.
- Oliver David (2017–2021): A former assistant coach for the Fighting Saints under Shaw and Lammers, David was most recently an assistant with the Portland Winterhawks of the Western Hockey League. David led the Fighting Saints to three playoff berths, and won USHL Coach of the Year in the curtailed 2019–20 season. After four seasons as head coach of the Fighting Saints, he accepted the assistant coach position with EHC Biel.
- Greg Brown (2021–present): Former assistant coach at Boston College and with the New York Rangers, Brown was hired for his first head coaching position by the Fighting Saints on June 28, 2021.

== Alumni in the NHL ==
Dubuque Fighting Saints alumni

Johnny Gaudreau (2010–11) - Selected as the Calgary Flames' fourth-round, 104th overall, in the 2011 NHL entry draft. "Johnny Hockey" was a member of the Boston College Eagles 2012 NCAA National Championship team, a finalist for the 2013 Hobey Baker Award, and the winner of the 2014 Hobey Baker Award as the top National Collegiate Athletic Association men's hockey player. He made his NHL debut with the Flames in the final game of the 2013–14 NHL season, scoring a goal in his first game. Selected as a rookie to play in the 2015 NHL All Star Game where he registered an assist. Johnny was a 2015 Calder Memorial Trophy finalist, finishing 3rd for the NHL rookie of the year award. Johnny has been selected as an NHL All Star on Team Pacific in 2016 and 2017. Bought a minority stake in the Fighting Saints' ownership group in 2018. On August 29, 2024; Johnny and his brother Matthew were tragically killed in a cycling accident.

Zemgus Girgensons (2010–11, 2011–12) - Selected as the Buffalo Sabres' first-round selection, 14th overall, in the 2012 NHL entry draft. He made his NHL debut with the Sabres during the 2013–14 NHL season, scoring a goal in his first game and becoming the first former Saint to play in the NHL since its return as a franchise. Zemgus was a member of Latvia's 2014 Olympic Men's Hockey Team held in Sochi, Russia. Zemgus was the first place vote-getter for the 2015 NHL All Star Game. Bought a minority stake in the Fighting Saints' ownership group in 2018.

Mike Matheson (2011–12) - Selected as the Florida Panthers' first-round selection, 23rd overall, in the 2012 NHL entry draft. After three seasons at Boston College, Matheson, a defenseman and team captain, signed with the Panthers and played with their AHL affiliate before making his NHL debut on February 20 of the 2015–16 NHL season.

Matt Benning (2012–13) - Selected by the Boston Bruins in the sixth-round, 175th overall in the 2012 NHL entry draft. After four seasons at Northeastern University, the defenseman signed an entry-level contract with the Edmonton Oilers and made his NHL debut against the Toronto Maple Leafs on November 1, 2016.

Riley Barber (2010–11) - Selected by the Washington Capitals in the sixth-round, 167th overall in the 2012 NHL entry draft. Barber played three seasons at Miami University in Oxford, Ohio, garnering a selection to the Central Collegiate Hockey Association All-Conference First Team. He was named captain of the 2014 United States Men's National Junior Ice Hockey Team and was a member of the 2013 United States gold medal-winning team. Made his NHL debut for the Washington Capitals on February 24, 2017. Signed a one-year contract with the Montreal Canadiens for 2019–20, and later traded to the Pittsburgh Penguins.
