= Kissinger Institute on China and the United States =

- Type: non-profit, membership and research organisation
- Established: 2008
- Director: Robert Daly
- Location: Washington, D.C.

The Kissinger Institute on China and the United States is a non-profit research organization dedicated to promoting greater understanding of issues in the relationship between the People's Republic of China and the United States and their impact on both countries and the world. It was inaugurated in 2008 and is part of the Woodrow Wilson International Center for Scholars. Its current director is Robert Daly.

== Founding Council Members ==
=== American Co-Chairman ===
- Henry Kissinger (1923–2023), former Secretary of State and National Security Adviser

=== Chinese Co-Chairman ===
- Xu Kuangdi, former President of the Chinese Academy of Engineering and Mayor of Shanghai

=== Vice Chairman ===
- Philip Falcone, Senior Managing Director, Harbinger Capital Partners

=== American Founding Council Members ===
- Richard Adkerson, President and CEO, Freeport McMoRan Copper and Gold
- Maurice "Hank" Greenberg, chairman and CEO, C.V. Starr and Company
- Barbara Hackman Franklin, President and CEO, Barbara Franklin Enterprises; former US Secretary of Commerce
- Carla A. Hills, chairman and CEO, Hills & Company, International Consultants; former U.S. Secretary of Housing and Urban Development; former US Trade Representative
- David Metzner, Managing Partner, American Continental Group
- Alexander Mirtchev, Founder and President, Krull Corp.
- Indra Nooyi, chairman and CEO, PepsiCo, Inc.
- David O'Reilly, former chairman and CEI, Chevron Corporation
- Robert Rubin, Co-chairman, Council on Foreign Relations; former US Secretary of the Treasury and Director of the National Economic Council
- George P. Shultz, Distinguished Fellow, Hoover Institution; former US Secretary of Labor, Secretary of the Treasury, and Secretary of State

=== Chinese Founding Council Members ===
- Tung Chee-hwa, former Hong Kong Chief Executive, Vice Chairman of the National Committee of the 11th Chinese People's Political Consultative Conference, and President of the China-US Exchange Foundation in Hong Kong
- Zhou Wenzhong, former PRC Ambassador to the United States
- Yang Wenchang, President of the Chinese People's Institute of Foreign Affairs, former Vice Minister of Foreign Affairs and Ambassador to Singapore
- Chen Yonglong, Vice President of the Chinese People's Institute of Foreign Affairs, former PRC Ambassador to Jordan and Israel
- Yang Jiemian, President of the Shanghai Institutes for International Studies and brother of PRC Foreign Minister Yang Jiechi
- Gao Xiqing, Vice Chairman, President, and CIO of China Investment Corporation (CIC), the PRC's principal sovereign wealth fund with over $200 billion under management
- Fu Chengyu, President of China National Offshore Oil Corporation (CNOOC)
- Wei Jiafu, Executive President and CEO of China Ocean Shipping (Group) Company (COSCO), one of the largest liner shipping companies worldwide and the largest dry bulk carrier in China
- Xu Lejiang, Chairman of Baosteel Group Corporation, China's largest iron and steel conglomerate and the third largest steel producer in the world

== Affiliated scholars ==
- Martin Dimitrov
