= List of Malmö Redhawks seasons =

This is a list of seasons of Malmö, Sweden-based ice hockey club, IF Malmö Redhawks, previously known as Malmö IF and MIF Redhawks.

Note: GP = Games played, W = Wins, L = Losses, T = Ties, Pts = Points, GF = Goals for, GA = Goals against

Season	Regular Season									Post–Season									Ref.
Season	League	GP	W	L	T/OT	Pts	GF	GA	Finish	Playoffs	GP	W	L	T	Pts	GF	GA	Finish	Ref.
1990–91	Elitserien	40	19	14	7	45	152	129	5th	Playoffs	2	0	2	—	—	3	8	Quarter-finals	
1991–92	Elitserien	40	21	13	6	48	163	134	2nd	Playoffs	10	7	3	—	—	36	21	Champions	
1992–93	Elitserien	40	21	14	5	47	152	130	3rd	Playoffs	6	3	3	—	—	16	27	Semi-finals	
1993–94	Elitserien	40	19	13	8	46	164	143	3rd	Playoffs	11	8	3	—	—	42	24	Champions	
1994–95	Elitserien	40	20	7	13	53	130	105	2nd	Playoffs	9	5	4	—	—	28	26	Semi-finals	
1995–96	Elitserien	40	15	18	7	37	129	147	8th	Playoffs	5	2	3	—	—	11	19	Quarter-finals	
1996–97	Elitserien	50	20	20	10	50	171	154	8th	Playoffs	4	1	3	—	—	7	13	Quarter-finals	
1997–98	Elitserien	46	17	21	8	42	134	121	9th	Did not qualify	—	—	—	—	—	—	—	—	
1998–99	Elitserien	50	18	23	9	68	140	144	8th	Playoffs	8	4	4	—	—	26	31	Semi-finals	
1999–2000	Elitserien	50	22	14	14	88	170	131	5th	Playoffs	6	2	4	—	—	13	16	Quarter-finals	
2000–01	Elitserien	50	19	17	14	78	156	134	5th	Playoffs	9	5	4	—	—	34	36	Semi-finals	
2001–02	Elitserien	50	19	21	10	74	138	143	6th	Playoffs	5	1	4	—	—	12	19	Quarter-finals	
2002–03	Elitserien	50	14	26	10	60	141	146	10th	Did not qualify	—	—	—	—	—	—	—	—	
2003–04	Elitserien	50	16	27	7	61	112	151	11th	Kvalserien	10	7	0	3	25	31	15	1st	
2004–05	Elitserien	50	12	35	3	39	111	171	12th	Kvalserien	10	4	3	3	15	29	22	3rd	
2005–06	HockeyAllsvenskan	42	33	6	3	104	180	70	1st	Kvalserien	10	8	2	0	24	43	22	1st	
2006–07	Elitserien	55	11	29	6	48	119	174	12th	Kvalserien	10	4	2	4	17	31	22	3rd	
2007–08	HockeyAllsvenskan	45	31	7	7	101	178	97	2nd	Kvalserien	10	5	3	2	17	35	30	3rd	
2008–09	HockeyAllsvenskan	45	17	16	12	72	145	108	8th	Did not qualify	—	—	—	—	—	—	—	—	
2009–10	HockeyAllsvenskan	52	25	16	11	92	165	146	5th	Playoff round	5	3	2	0	—	10	12	Round 2	
2010–11	HockeyAllsvenskan	52	21	18	13	80	153	144	8th	Did not qualify	—	—	—	—	—	—	—	—	
2011–12	HockeyAllsvenskan	52	22	21	9	81	139	140	7th	Playoff round	6	4	2	0	13	19	13	2nd	
2012–13	HockeyAllsvenskan	52	20	24	8	71	151	150	9th	Did not qualify	—	—	—	—	—	—	—	—	
2013–14	HockeyAllsvenskan	52	30	12	10	105	160	113	1st	Kvalserien	10	4	4	2	15	25	27	4th	
2014–15	HockeyAllsvenskan	52	25	14	13	95	168	122	3rd	Slutspelsserien Direktkval till SHL	5 7	1 4	3 3	1 —	8 —	8 23	13 18	3rd Winners	
2015–16	SHL	52	15	26	11	61	116	153	12th	Did not qualify	—	—	—	—	—	—	—	—	
2016–17	SHL	52	23	20	9	81	132	116	8th	Playoffs	13	4	5	4	—	35	38	Semi-finals	
2017–18	SHL	52	20	14	18	86	152	138	6th	Playoffs	10	4	5	1	—	22	22	Semi-finals	
2018–19	SHL	52	21	20	11	82	136	125	6th	Playoffs	5	1	4	0	—	9	22	Quarter-finals	
2019–20	SHL	52	25	21	6	77	131	130	9th	Playoffs	Playoffs cancelled due to the COVID-19 pandemic								
2020–21	SHL	52	23	27	2	67	123	151	9th	Playoffs	2	0	1	1	—	5	8	Eighth-finals	
2021–22	SHL	52	21	23	8	67	134	153	12th	Did not qualify	—	—	—	—	—	—	—	—	
2022–23	SHL	52	20	25	7	61	133	156	14th	Did not qualify	—	—	—	—	—	—	—	—	
2023–24	SHL	52	21	24	7	65	138	150	12th	Did not qualify	—	—	—	—	—	—	—	—	
2024–25	SHL	52	24	23	5	71	123	147	10th	Playoffs	8	4	4	0	—	20	21	Quarter-finals	
