= Robert Daly =

Robert Daly may refer to:

- Robert A. Daly (born 1936), American business executive
- Robert Daly (sprinter) (born 1978), Irish track and field sprinter
- Robert Daly (bishop) (1783–1872), bishop of Cashel and Waterford
- Robert Daly (bishop of Kildare), Anglican bishop of Kildare, 1564–1583
- Robert Daly (director), director of the Kissinger Institute on China and the United States
- Robert Daly, a character in the Black Mirror episode USS Callister

== See also ==
- Robert Daley (1930–2026), American author
- Robert Daley (producer), American film producer
- Bob Dailey (1953–2016), Canadian ice hockey player
- Bob Daily, American television producer and screenwriter
