= Harbinger Capital =

American private hedge fund

Harbinger Capital Partners
- Type: Private company
- Industry: Financials
- Founded: 2001 in Birmingham, Alabama by Harbert Management Corporation
- Headquarters: New York City, New York, USA
- Key people: Philip Falcone (Senior Managing Director)
- AUM: $336 million

Harbinger Capital Partners was a private hedge fund based in New York City, New York, founded by Philip Falcone. Harbinger was a highly diversified multi-strategy hedge fund. Notable investments included sub-prime mortgages in the United States and the United Kingdom, such as HBOS, and LightSquared, a wireless communications company that filed for bankruptcy in 2012. The fund was wound down after a series of legal problems.

== History ==
Harbinger was founded in 2001 by Philip Falcone and Harbert Management Corporation, a Birmingham, Alabama-based investment company that provided much of the original funding. Harbinger had funds under management of $26.5 billion (£13.4 billion) as of the end of June 2008. In 2009, Harbinger acquired the ownership of its funds from Harbert. Also in 2009, Harbinger acquired controlling stock of the Zapata Corporation from the Glazer family and changed its name to The Harbinger Group Inc. (NYSE: HRG). The hedge fund is based in New York, New York. The firm's hedge funds include the Harbinger Capital Partners Master Fund, the Credit Distressed BlueLine Fund, and Harbinger Capital Partners Special Situations Fund.

Harbinger has owned large stakes in The New York Times Company, Cleveland-Cliffs, and 28% stock ownership of satellite communications company Inmarsat. The company has also owned stakes in rival satellite operators SkyTerra and Terrestar, and British sugar producer Tate & Lyle. The company was ranked on the Wall Street Journal's "The Hedge Fund 100" list in 2008 and 2009. According to press accounts the assets under management at Harbinger peaked at $26 billion in 2008 and had declined to approximately $9 billion as of 2010 due to sizeable investor redemptions with approximately 40% of that total (approximately $3.5 billion) concentrated in investments related to building a high-speed wireless network in the United States.

Harbinger Capital, which owned Russell Hobbs, merged it with Spectrum Brands on June 16, 2010, for $661 million and now controls approximately 64% of the appliance maker, Spectrum.

In November 2014, Falcone announced his resignation as chief executive and chairman from Harbinger Group HRG, whose second-biggest shareholder is Harbinger Capital. Falcone was paid a lump sum of $40.3 million upon his resignation.

In March 2015, the lawsuit accusing Falcone and Harbinger Capital Partners of "misleading investors about the firm's stake in LightSquared Inc." was dismissed. That same month, a judge approved Harbinger Capital's restructuring plan of LightSquared, which paid off lender Charlie Ergen, and put LightSquared in the hands of investors, including JP Morgan Chase. As part of the deal, Harbinger maintained 44% equity, but Falcone would no longer be involved in day-to-day operations.

As of 2015, the top equity holdings of the firm were in the shares of the following companies: Spectrum Brands Inc, Harbinger Group Inc, North American Energy Partners Inc, and EXCO Resources Inc.

In December 2017, Harbinger Capital Partners filed a lawsuit against Apollo Global Management, alleging fraud over "pouring" "$2 billion into the ill-fated wireless venture formerly known as LightSquared Inc." The case was eventually dismissed in 2025 when it was shown that Harbinger failed to file the lawsuit before the six-year statute of limitations expired. By then, the fund had been wound down.

== SEC settlement ==
In August 2013, the firm reached a settlement with the SEC agreeing to pay more than $18 million and admit wrongdoing. As part of the settlement, Harbinger Senior Managing Director Philip Falcone was also barred from the securities industry for at least five years, but it did not prohibit him from working as an officer or director of a public company. Among the SEC's multiple allegations were that Falcone misused fund assets and diverted fund assets for personal use, that the fund engaged in redemption and other practices that favored certain investors over others, and that fund attempted to conduct an improper short squeeze on the bonds of Canadian manufacturing firm, partially in retaliation against a competitor investment firm. Harbinger and Falcone largely admitted to these allegations in the settlement.

July 4, 2014, the U.S. Security and Exchange Commission's Office of the Whistleblower issued a "Final Order" in matter number 2012 -81 ruling that rejected a claim made by an individual requesting a reward for assisting in the investigation. The SEC rejected the claim, asserting in the "Claimant did not provide information that led to the successful enforcement" and denying the application.

== See also ==
- Harbert Management Corporation
- HRG Group
