= Philip Falcone =

American businessman

Philip A. Falcone
- Born: Chisholm, Minnesota
- Education: Harvard University
- Occupation: CEO of HC2 Holdings
- Organization(s): Kidder, Peabody & Co. Kissinger Institute on China and the United States

Philip A. Falcone is an American businessman and the founder of Harbinger Capital and LightSquared.

== Early life and education ==
Philip Falcone grew up in Chisholm, Minnesota with nine siblings in a three-bedroom house. He attended Harvard University on financial aid and graduated with a Bachelor of Arts in Economics in 1984.

Growing up in Chisholm, Falcone was a stand-out hockey player. He went on to play Varsity hockey at Harvard. After graduating, Falcone played professionally for the Malmö Redhawks, a Swedish professional hockey team, until his playing career ended after one professional season when he sustained a leg injury.

== Career ==
In 1985, he started his career at Kidder, Peabody & Co. He also worked at Wachovia. He was also Senior High Yield trader at First Union Capital Markets in Charlotte, North Carolina. From 1990 to 1995, he served as president and CEO of AAB Manufacturing Corporation". He was the head of High Yield trading at Gleacher Natwest from 1997 to 1998, and at Barclays Capital from 1998 to 2000.

In 2000, he founded Harbinger Capital with Raymond J. Harbert. In 2008, Falcone became a minority owner of the NHL's Minnesota Wild hockey team when he purchased a 40% stake of the hockey team. Through Harbinger Capital, Falcone and Harbert owned 20% of The New York Times in 2009. That same year, Falcone became its majority owner, though Harbert remained an investor.

He is a founding council member of the Kissinger Institute on China and the United States. He has made further donations to the American Museum of Natural History.

In February 2013, Forbes listed Falcone as one of the 40 Highest-Earning hedge fund managers.

On November 25, 2014, it was announced that Falcone would step down as chief executive and chairman of Harbinger Group effective December 1 to focus on his other venture, HC2 Holdings.

=== Lightsquared ===
A significant focus on Phil Falcone's investment activities has been the telecommunications company Lightsquared, which attempted to build a multibillion-dollar satellite-based network that would have supplied 4G wireless broadband in competition with AT&T and Verizon Wireless. The plan, however, consisted of gaining wireless spectrum reserved for satellite uses and employing it for terrestrial communication. Critics described this use of wireless spectrum as a loophole meant to avoid paying royalties to the government. Lightsquared changed its name to Ligado Networks, and as of 2024, continues to operate under that name.

Republican legislators like Chuck Grassley, Ralph Hall and Darrell Issa expressed concerns that Falcone would receive special treatment to develop LightSquared over the United States Military's Global Positioning System. Falcone later denied the claim. On February 15, 2012, the Federal Communications Commission revoked the 2011 conditional approval for further development of the LightSquared network, stating it would interfere with GPS signals.

=== 2012 securities fraud charge ===
On June 27, 2012, the U.S. Securities and Exchange Commission filed securities fraud charges against Falcone and Harbinger Capital Partners, alleging that Falcone "used fund assets [of $113.2 million] to pay his taxes, conducted an illegal 'short squeeze' to manipulate bond prices, secretly favored certain customers at the expense of others, and that Harbinger unlawfully bought equity securities in a public offering, after having sold short the same security during a restricted period."

The short squeeze was performed by Falcone in relation to a series of high-yield bonds issued by MAAX Holdings. After hearing that a firm was shorting the bonds, Falcone purchased the entire issue of bonds. He also lent the bonds to the short-sellers, and then bought them back when the traders sold them. As a result, his total exposure exceeded the entire issue of the MAAX bonds. Falcone then stopped lending the bonds, so that short-sellers could not liquidate their positions anymore. The price of the bonds rose dramatically. The short-sellers could only liquidate their positions by contacting Falcone directly.

In May 2013, he accepted an SEC settlement in which he and Harbinger agreed to pay a total of $18 million. Under the deal, Falcone would have been banned from operating as an investment advisor for two years. However, in a rare move, the commissioners overruled the enforcement staff and threw out the deal, forcing the two sides back to the bargaining table. Reportedly, SEC chairwoman Mary Jo White felt the deal was too lenient. Finally, on August 19, the SEC and Falcone agreed to a deal in which he and Harbinger admitted breaking the securities laws. It was the first SEC settlement in years in which the defendant was required to admit wrongdoing; usually, defendants who accept SEC settlements do not admit or deny illegal activity.

Under the terms of the deal, Falcone paid a total of $11.5 million of his own money to settle the charges. He disgorged a total of $6.5 million in illicit profits and pay $1.01 million in prejudgment interest and $4 million in civil penalties, and also accepted a five-year ban from the securities industry. By comparison, the May deal required him to pay only $4 million out of his own pocket. Harbinger paid $6.5 million in civil penalties. Falcone admitted to siphoning off $113.2 million of Harbinger assets to pay his personal state and federal taxes and pay customer redemptions to favored clients. He also admitted to manipulating the bond price of MAAX Holdings, a Canadian bathroom products manufacturer, by buying up all of the outstanding bonds and demanding that Goldman Sachs settle all outstanding MAAX transactions and deliver the bonds it owed. Falcone was well aware Goldman couldn't deliver the bonds because all of them were tied up by Harbinger.

On July 4, 2014, the SEC Office of the Whistleblower rejected a claim made by an individual requesting a reward for assisting in the investigation. The SEC rejected the claim, asserting in the "Claimant did not provide information that led to the successful enforcement".

== Personal life ==
Falcone is married with two children, and lives in New York City. In 1997, Falcone married Lisa Velasquez . Lisa was born in 1961 and grew up in Spanish Harlem and has an associate's degree from Pace University. In 1985, she went to Milan Italy to model. In 2008, she started a film production company, Everest Entertainment, and she has produced Mother and Child, 127 Hours, and Win Win. She is active in philanthropic causes, including the American Museum of Natural History and sits on the board of the New York City Ballet. In 2009, the couple reportedly donated $10 million to New York City's High Line project. They have twin daughters, Liliana and Carolina (born February 2005).

In 1999, Falcone built a house in Sag Harbor, New York, which he sold in 2005 for $1.57 million.

In 2008, Falcone bought a house on the Upper East Side, formerly owned by Jeremiah Milbank and later Bob Guccione, for $49 million. Also in 2008, Falcone bought a Saint Barthélemy villa for $39 million, which he sold in 2019.

Falcone's former chef, Brian Villanueva, sued Falcone over an allegedly hostile work environment and alleged racist remarks and they had settled out of court for $60,000. In 2020, Villaneuva filed a new lawsuit claiming to not have been paid the settlement, while Falcone claimed to not have the funds.

As of 2026, the New York State Department of Taxation and Finance listed Philip and Lisa Falcone as the top tax delinquents in the state.
