= Mats Lusth =

Swedish ice hockey player and coach

- Born: 20 May 1962 (age 63) Gävle, Sweden
- Height: 6 ft 2 in (188 cm)
- Weight: 209 lb (95 kg; 14 st 13 lb)
- Position: Right Winger
- Shot: Right
- Played for: Malmö IF (SEL); Färjestad BK; Leksands IF; Mora IK; Västerås IK
- Playing career: 1979–2001

Mats Lusth (born May 20, 1962) is a former ice hockey player and coach. After working as an assistant coach for Malmö Redhawks of the SHL, he was the team's head coach for the 2013–2014 and 2014–15 seasons. As a player, Lusth spent most of his career playing in Elitserien. He has played for Mora IK, Färjestad BK, Malmö Redhawks, GCK Lions of National League B, Leksands IF and Västerås. Lusth has also coached a number of teams including Alleghe Hockey in the Italian Serie A and the Brûleurs de Loups of Grenoble in the French Ligue Magnus.

== Career statistics ==
			Regular season					Playoffs
Season	Team	League	GP	G	A	Pts	PIM	GP	G	A	Pts	PIM
1979–80	Mora IK	Division 1	1	0	0	0	0	--	--	--	--	--
1980–81	Mora IK	Division 1	23	2	2	4	18	5	0	0	0	8
1981–82	Mora IK	Division 1	33	5	15	20	76	4	2	1	3	20
1982–83	Mara IK	Division 1	31	12	9	10	19	34	--	--	--	--
1983–84	Färjestad BK	Elitserien	28	4	6	10	28	--	--	--	--	--
1984–85	Färjestad BK	Elitserien	36	5	8	13	46	3	0	2	2	10
1985–86	Färjestad BK	Elitserien	31	2	11	13	42	8	0	3	3	18
1986–87	Färjestad BK	Elitserien	28	6	5	11	38	7	0	1	1	12
1987–88	Färjestad BK	Elitserien	26	6	3	9	30	3	0	1	1	0
1988–89	Malmö Redhawks	Division 1	25	8	24	32	56	10	6	7	13	10
1989–90	Malmö Redhwaks	Division 1	36	16	18	34	59	3	1	1	2	2
1990–91	Malmö Redhawks	Elitserien	20	4	8	12	34	1	0	0	0	0
1991–92	Malmö Redhawks	Elitserien	29	8	12	20	72	10	1	2	3	12
1992–93	Malmö Redhawks	Elitserien	38	8	9	17	90	6	0	4	4	6
1993–94	GCK Lions	National League B	37	7	11	18	57	4	1	2	3	10
1994–95	Leksands IF	Elitserien	40	1	8	9	60	4	0	0	0	6
1995–96	VIK Västerås HK	Elitserien	33	6	15	21	42	--	--	--	--	--
1996–97	Malmö Redhawks	Elitserien	41	5	7	12	52	4	0	0	0	12
1997–98	Malmö Redhawks	Elitserien	46	11	9	20	114	--	--	--	--	--
1998–99	Malmö Redhawks	Elitserien	48	6	16	22	48	8	0	2	2	26
1999–00	Malmö Redhawks	Elitserien	37	5	7	12	81	5	1	2	3	10
2000–01	Mora IK	HockeyAllsvenskan	13	3	4	7	34	--	--	--	--	--
Division 1/Allsvenskan totals			162	43	73	106	277	22	9	9	18	40
Elitserien totals			481	77	124	201	777	59	2	17	19	112
