= Malmö Redhawks =

Ice hockey team in Sweden

- City: Malmö, Sweden
- League: Swedish Hockey League
- Founded: 28 February 1972; 54 years ago
- Home arena: Malmö Arena (capacity: 12,600)
- Colors
- Owner: Malmö Redhawks Holding
- General manager: Oscar Alsenfelt
- Head coach: Tomas Kollar
- Captain: Fredrik Händemark
- Website: malmoredhawks.com

Franchise history
- 1944–1972: Malmö FF Ishockey
- 1972–2001: Malmö IF
- 2001–2004: MIF Redhawks
- 2004–present: IF Malmö Redhawks

Championships
- Le Mat Trophy: 1992, 1994

The Malmö Redhawks (colloquially referred to simply as Malmö or by past abbreviation MIF) is a Swedish professional ice hockey team based in Malmö, Sweden, which plays in the SHL, with Malmö Arena as the venue for home games.

The history of the team dates back to 1944 as the ice hockey division of the now exclusively football club Malmö FF. In 1972 the team divested from Malmö FF, marking the start of the hockey association initially known as Malmö IF. The team name was changed to MIF Redhawks in 2001 and then to the present name IF Malmö Redhawks in 2004. Officially the team goes by the name Ishockeyföreningen Malmö Redhawks (Ice Hockey Association Malmö Redhawks). The current CEO is Patrik Sylvegård who represented the team during his senior playing career.

== History ==
The team was inaugurated on 28 February 1972 as Malmö Ishockeyförening (Malmö Ice Hockey Association, or MIF) when the ice hockey division of Malmö FF was transitioned into an independent association. The early history of the team was spent in the lower divisions of Swedish hockey. Relegation to Division 2 in 1984 became the spark to a series of events including the departure of Nils Yngvesson who had been chairman of the association since its creation in 1972. The team only played one season in Division 2 before being promoted back to Division 1, where Malmö IF made what it referred to as "the biggest investment in Swedish sports history".

The team's campaign to reach the top league failed that season, but in the 1989–90 season, the team finished first in both their autumn Division 1 group, as well as the Allsvenskan in the spring, and then won the Allsvenskan final 3–0 in games against MoDo to secure promotion to Elitserien (today called the SHL) for the first time. They would remain in the top flight for 15 seasons, a period that would bring two name changes (to MIF Redhawks in 1996 and to IF Malmö Redhawks (Note: Ishockeyföreningen Malmö Redhawks (Ice Hockey Association Malmö Redhawks) – the new name and logo also brought by a new color setup) in 2003), as well as two Swedish Championship titles, in 1992 and 1994, and the 1992–93 European championship.

=== Mid 2000s downturn ===
At the end of the 2004–05 season, the Redhawks participated in the qualification series to stay in Elitserien, where they did not manage to secure one of the spots for staying up, and were relegated. Thus, as of the 2005–06 season, they played in the HockeyAllsvenskan, the second division hockey league in Sweden; at the end of the season, the top four teams played the qualification series with the bottom two teams of Elitserien. Malmö won the qualification round and played in Elitserien during the 2006–07 season.

In 2007, the Malmö Redhawks participated in a qualification series (Kvalserien) consisting of the top four teams of HockeyAllsvenskan and the bottom two teams from Elitserien, having finished 12th in the 2006–07 Elitserien season. Malmö were considered favourites alongside the second team from Elitserien, Skellefteå AIK, but failed to re-qualify for Elitserien, falling two points behind Södertälje SK. In 2008 the team once again managed to reach Kvalserien, and had a golden opportunity to advance to Elitserien, leading the series for a majority of rounds. The Redhawks, however, lost in overtime of the final round while their arch rivals, Rögle BK, claimed the Elitserien spot with a margin of two points by scoring twice in the last minute of play. The Redhawks only managed to get 2 points in the 2008 Kvalserien last four rounds, despite having gotten 15 points after the first six games.

=== New arena and financial issues ===
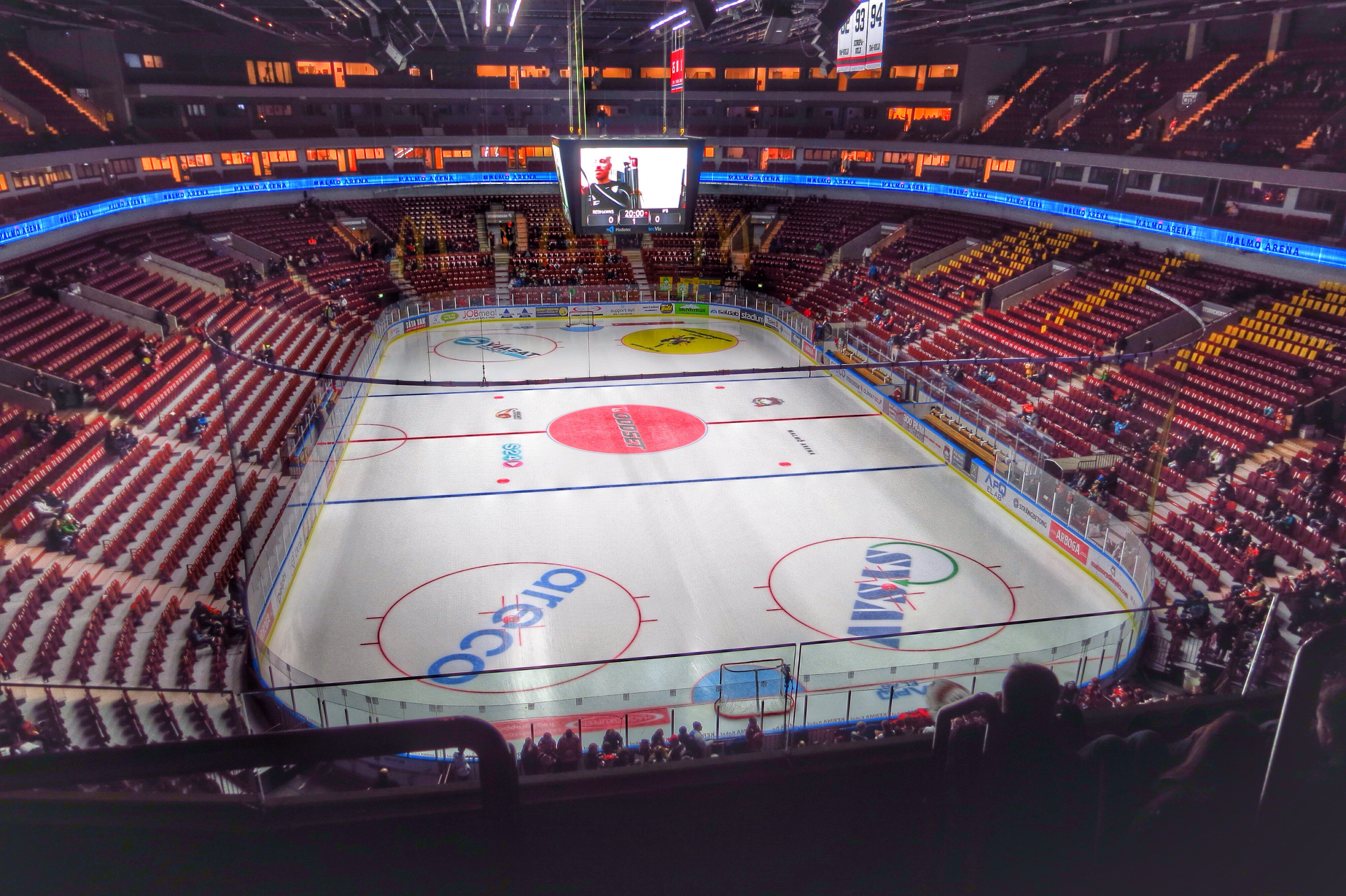
Interior of Malmö Arena.

During the 2008–09 season, the Redhawks moved to the newly inaugurated Malmö Arena, a state-of-the-art sports and entertainment venue, located in Hyllie in the southern parts of Malmö.

On 29 January 2009, while still playing in HockeyAllsvenskan, the team released all its contracted players due to financial debt and in order to avoid bankruptcy. The players were made free to find and sign with other teams. By then the Redhawks were ranked 10th in the league with only one month of games remaining to play, instead of the top three or seven required for Kvalserien and possible Elitserien qualification. The team finished 8th and thus missed the playoffs, although the team was just one point short from reaching the playoffs.

=== Failures to reach Kvalserien and started efforts ===
Malmö finished fifth in HockeyAllsvenskan in the 2009–10 season and thus reached the playoffs, which was an improvement over last season. The Redhawks started the playoffs by knocking out Bofors IK in two straight games, and the Redhawks were now set to face Almtuna IS for a series that would decide which team would be HockeyAllsvenskan's fourth one in Kvalserien. The Redhawks beat Almtuna 2–1 at home in the first game, but lost the two following games (which the Redhawks played on away ice) and thus were eliminated from the playoffs. In the 2010–11 season, things went worse as the Redhawks failed to reach the playoffs, finishing 8th and four points short from a playoff spot.

On 28 January 2011, during the 2010–11 season, the Redhawks announced that they had agreed to a 3-year 70-million SEK (10.6 million US$) deal with investor Hugo Stenbeck. The intention with the deal was to get Malmö Redhawks back to Elitserien.

Malmö's efforts to reach Elitserien started immediately prior to the 2011–12 season. Several players from higher divisions, including Hannu Toivonen, Daniel Josefsson, J. D. Forrest, Jean-Luc Grand-Pierre and Linus Klasen, joined the team. When Linus Klasen joined the team on 17 May 2011, he was immediately appointed the team's captain. Linus Klasen's three-year contract included an annual salary of 4 million SEK (US$0.6 million), which made Klasen the best paid ice hockey player in Sweden at that time.

The season started well with a top-three spot in the league after a couple of months, but after falling down to sixth place with 47 points, at that time 10 points away from the third Kvalserien spot, Redhawks then-head coach Leif Strömberg was fired on 10 December 2011. He was replaced by the team's then-assistant coach Ulf Taavola. Patrik Sylvegård was acquired as the team's new assistant coach. After continuing to struggle throughout January, the Malmö Redhawks improved in February, and managed a seventh-place finish in the league, which was enough for a playoff spot. In the Playoff round, Malmö finished second due to inferior goal difference than Rögle BK, and did not qualify the 2012 Kvalserien.

=== Reconstruction ===
In early 2012, the Malmö Redhawks stated that the financial situation needed to be reviewed, after Hugo Stenbeck had withdrawn from the organisation. They filed for economic reconstruction on 11 April 2012. The filing was granted the following day. The team re-negotiated the most expensive player contracts in order to reduce the total squad salary from 30 million SEK to 18 million.

On 17 May 2012 it was announced that the Malmö Redhawks and Hugo Stenbeck had agreed that Stenbeck would help buy out Linus Klasen and Hannu Toivonen due to their expensive contracts.

After the 2011–12 season, Patrik Sylvegård was appointed CEO and sports director, and Redhawks profile Mats Lusth was acquired as the new assistant coach. A Sports Committee was also created, which includes people with strong connection to the Malmö Redhawks. Ulf Taavola continued as head coach like the previous season when he took over Leif Strömberg. The Malmö Redhawks had to sign a lot of new players. The players who remained from last season were Pontus Sjögren, Emil Carnestad, Stefan Lassen, Alexander Ribbenstrand, Robin Alvarez, Lukas Eriksson, Magnus Häggström, Tomas Kollar and Roger Olsson.

The Malmö Redhawks started the 2012–13 season in poor fashion and after 17 games played, the team had only taken 21 points, which was far from even a playoff spot towards Kvalserien. Eventually, the team began a massive boost, which went through the month of November without a single loss after regulation time, and took a total of 24 out of 27 points that month. As a result of the great effort in November, the Redhawks were located in fifth place in the league by early December. In January, the team began a losing streak and lost eight games in a row. The team finished in ninth place, which was the worst placing the team had since the large investments during the late 1980s. In Malmö, the season was over on March 2, when the regular season was finished. Having won the 2013–14 HockeyAllsvenskan the year after they fell just short of qualifying for the first tier with a 4th place finish and 15 points in the 2014 Kvalserien.

=== SHL comeback ===
This was Malmö's eighth consecutive season in HockeyAllsvenskan, which is the second-highest league in Sweden. In the regular-season from 11 September 2014 to 26 February 2015 Malmö finished in third place which meant they qualified for 2015 Slutsspelsserien against Leksands IF. Coming into game seven it was tied 3-3 and the game was played on Leksand's arena Tegera Arena, after a hard-fought game Malmö Redhawks won 4-2 with one goal being with empty net. Winning against Leksands IF meant that Malmö now played in SHL.

Since the comeback to the top flight, the team has managed to reach the semi-final in 2017 and 2018, and an additional quarter final in 2019.

== Season-by-season record ==
This is a partial list of the last five seasons completed by the Redhawks. For the full season-by-season history, see List of Malmö Redhawks seasons

Note: GP = Games played, W = Wins, L = Losses, OTL = Overtime Losses, Pts = Points, GF = Goals for, GA = Goals against

Season	Regular Season									Post–Season									Ref.
Season	League	GP	W	L	OTL	Pts	GF	GA	Finish	Playoffs	GP	W	L	OTL	Pts	GF	GA	Finish	Ref.
2020–21	SHL	52	23	27	2	67	123	151	9th	Playoffs	2	0	1	1	—	5	8	Eighth-finals	
2021–22	SHL	52	21	23	8	67	134	153	12th	Did not qualify	—	—	—	—	—	—	—	—	
2022–23	SHL	52	20	25	7	61	133	156	14th	Did not qualify	—	—	—	—	—	—	—	—	
2023–24	SHL	52	21	24	7	65	138	150	12th	Did not qualify	—	—	—	—	—	—	—	—	
2024–25	SHL	52	24	23	5	71	123	147	10th	Playoffs	8	4	4	0	—	20	21	Quarter-finals	

== Players and personnel ==
=== Current roster ===
No.	Nat	Player	Pos	S/G	Age	Acquired	Birthplace
49	(Canada)	Seth Barton	D	R	27	2025	Kelowna, British Columbia, Canada
20	(Norway)	Thomas Berg-Paulsen	C	L	27	2023	Stavanger, Norway
41	(Sweden)	Joseph Berger	D	L	26	2024	Visby, Sweden
24	(Sweden)	Filip Björkman	RW	L	23	2025	Eskilstuna, Sweden
16	(Germany)	Maximilian Eisenmenger	C	L	28	2025	Münster, Germany
78	(Czech Republic)	Robin Hanzl	C	L	37	2024	Ústí nad Labem, Czech Republic
63	(Sweden)	Fredrik Händemark (C)	C	L	33	2021	Björbo, Sweden
32	(Finland)	Joona Ikonen	RW	R	28	2024	Tampere, Finland
17	(Sweden)	Johan Ivarsson	D	L	31	2023	Höör, Sweden
22	(Finland)	Janne Kuokkanen	C	L	28	2025	Oulunsalo, Finland
94	(Czech Republic)	Marek Langhamer	G	L	32	2024	Moravská Třebová, Czech Republic
15	(Sweden)	Freddie Larsson	RW	L	22	2022	Helsingborg, Sweden
7	(Finland)	Topi Niemelä	D	R	24	2025	Oulun, Finland
26	(Sweden)	Patrik Norén	D	L	33	2025	Säter, Sweden
12	(Sweden)	Linus Öberg	RW	R	26	2024	Vänersborg, Sweden
48	(Finland)	Lauri Pajuniemi	RW	R	27	2025	Tampere, Finland
95	(Sweden)	Carl Persson	LW	L	31	2018	Kristianstad, Sweden
42	(Finland)	Robin Salo	D	L	28	2024	Espoo, Finland
4	(Sweden)	Martin Schreiber	D	L	24	2025	Karlskoga, Sweden
91	(Sweden)	Axel Sundberg	RW	R	28	2023	Stockholm, Sweden
13	(Norway)	Petter Vesterheim	C	L	22	2024	Lørenskog, Norway
6	(Finland)	Eemil Viro	D	L	24	2025	Vantaa, Finland
10	(Sweden)	William von Barnekow	F	L	23	2020	Malmö, Sweden

Last updated on 27 November 2025.

=== Honored members ===
Malmö Redhawks retired numbers
No.	Player	Position	Career	No. retirement
1	Peter Lindmark	Goaltender	1988–97	8 November 2011
5	Roger Nordström	Goaltender	1983–98	16 February 2015
18	Patrik Sylvegård	Right wing	1987–99	21 September 2000
21	Jesper Mattsson	Center	1991-95; 1998-04; 2010-12	29 February 2020
25	Kaj Olsson	Left wing	1975–86	—
66	Mats Lusth	Defense	1988-93; 1996-00	12 January 2017

=== Notable alumni ===
- Philip Falcone
- Peter Andersson
- Róbert Švehla
- Richard Park
- Raimo Helminen
- Mats Näslund
- Mats Hallin
- Fedor Fedorov
- Peter Hammarström
- Andreas Lilja
- Kim Johnsson
- Juha Riihijärvi
- Daniel Rydmark
- Jani Hurme
- Tomas Sandström
- Gustav Nyquist
- Carl Söderberg
- Martin Fehérváry
- Rasmus Andersson
- André Burakovsky

== Trophies and awards ==
=== Team ===
- Le Mat Trophy (2): 1992, 1994
- European Cup (1): 1992

== See also ==
- Ice hockey in Sweden

== Notes ==
Preceded by Djurgårdens IF	Swedish ice hockey champions 1992	Succeeded by Brynäs IF
Preceded by Brynäs IF	Swedish ice hockey champions 1994	Succeeded by HV71
