= Ligado Networks =

American communications company

- Type: Private
- Industry: Satellite communications
- Founded: December 7, 2015
- Headquarters: Reston, Virginia, United States
- Area served: North America
- Key people: President and Chief Executive Officer Douglas Smith
- Products: Satellite communications
- Owner: Centerbridge Partners; Fortress Investment Group; JPMorgan Chase; (controlling owners)
- Website: www.ligado.com

Ligado Networks, formerly known as LightSquared, is an American satellite communications company.

After restructuring, emerging from bankruptcy and modifying its network plan, the new company, Ligado Networks, launched in 2016. It operates the SkyTerra 1 satellite.

== Operations ==
Ligado Networks is based in Reston, Virginia. The company is governed by a seven-member board of directors with Ivan Seidenberg as Chairman and Doug Smith as president and CEO. Fortress Investment Group, Centerbridge Partners and JPMorgan Chase own controlling stakes in Ligado Networks; Harbinger Capital Partners maintains a minority stake.

Ligado Networks has 40 MHz of spectrum licenses in the nationwide block of 1500 MHz to 1700 MHz spectrum in the L-Band. With it, the company is developing a satellite-terrestrial network to support the emerging 5G market and Internet of Things applications.

== Network and spectrum ==
The company (as LightSquared) reached a cooperation agreement in 2007 with Inmarsat, a British satellite telecommunications company, that rearranged the L-Band spectrum so the company could use a larger, contiguous stretch of spectrum. Potential interference issues at the time prevented LightSquared from deploying the network.

In 2010, the company acquired licenses to mid-band spectrum when it bought SkyTerra Communications. LightSquared's plans, which did not come to fruition, were to use the spectrum to create a 4G wireless mobile network covering North America.

=== 5G/GPS spectrum ===
Ligado received FCC's unanimous approval for use of spectrum near the L-bands used by GPS signals for their 5G networks in April 2020. The decision came after letters from the Department of Defense and members of Congress suggested that the company using spectrum would interfere with military capabilities. Secretary of Defense Mark Esper warned of the risks, and a spokesman for the Pentagon argued that the request should be denied. The request was also opposed by Iridium Communications and the Federal Aviation Administration.

After the FCC approval, Bradford Parkinson, lead architect of the Global Positioning System and member of the National Executive Committee for Space-Based Positioning, Navigation and Timing, said that the FCC had made a "grave error" in their approval. An advisory committee agreed that the approval was a risk. Major aviation associations including the Air Line Pilots Association, International, Aerospace Industries Association, Aircraft Owners and Pilots Association (AOPA), and others all filed statements in opposition to the order. Other major GPS users, including Lockheed, Garmin, Trimble, and others also filed statements in opposition. Additionally, after the ruling, the Department of Defense and Department of Transportation issued a joint statement of opposition; the latter noted safety losses from impacts to E-911 service. The HASC committee chairman, Rep. Adam Smith called it a security risk.

In early May, the SASC held a hearing on the effects of the decision. Referencing the COVID-19 pandemic, Chairman Sen. James Inhofe charged FCC, stating "a few powerful people made a hasty decision over the weekend, in the middle of a national crisis, against the judgment of every other agency involved". The DOD said they had filed multiple objections and believed the license would be denied. The DOD objected to a draft of the approval in October 2019 and communicated this back to the FCC, who shared their rejection with Ligado. The FCC was not invited to participate; it is overseen by another committee. Ligado was also not invited to participate, which their CEO and Chairman both complained about in a joint statement. The following day, the HASC wrote a letter on behalf of the entire committee denouncing the decision and asking oversight questions. HASC and FCC participated in a conference call on May 21. On the following day, the National Telecommunications and Information Administration formally petitioned the FCC to request for a reversal of the decision. Ligado stated AG William Barr, Secretary of State Mike Pompeo and others supported their license. On May 26, FCC Chairman Ajit Pai responded to the HASC, commenting on the interagency conflict and defending their decision.

In June 2020, Sen. Inhofe proposed legislation requiring Ligado to be liable for costs associated with their impact to GPS reception for any user of the service. Rep. Michael Turner added language to the annual defense funding bill that would effectively ban Ligado from receiving contracts with DoD, and Sen. Inhofe did the same in their version of the bill. Members of the HASC asked for an investigation into Dennis Roberson, who is both the head of FCC's Technical Advisory Council and the head of Roberson and Associates, which provided a report to the FCC on Ligado's behalf. The Keep GPS Working Coalition was created in late June, representing a broad range of industries including the Boat Owners Association, AOPA, AFBF, and others.

On October 13, 2023, Ligado announced that it would be preparing to file for Chapter 11 bankruptcy for the second time in eleven years after government talks over a multibillion-dollar claim asserted by the company collapsed and fell through. On October 16, 2023, Ligado sued the U.S. government, stating that the Department of Defense is using its spectrum illegally, alleging that the U.S. government misappropriated Ligado's exclusively talked spectrum to support secret DoD systems that have been using the spectrum without consent. Ligado Networks filed for Chapter 11 bankruptcy on January 5, 2025.

== History ==
Ligado Networks originated in 1988 with the company American Mobile Satellite Corporation (which became Motient Corporation), and later as Mobile Satellite Ventures after a merger between Motient Corporation and TMI Communications. The company originally operated two geostationary satellites covering the North American market: MSAT-2, licensed in the United States, launched in 1995; the next year, the company launched MSAT-1, which is licensed in Canada.

Mobile Satellite Ventures changed its name to SkyTerra Communications in 2008. LightSquared emerged from SkyTerra after Philip Falcone's Harbinger Capital Partners acquired SkyTerra in March 2010. The company received about $2.9 billion in assets from Harbinger and affiliates, as well as more than $2.3 billion in debt and equity financing. LightSquared sought to develop a 4G LTE wireless broadband network using spectrum in the L-Band.

The company launched its SkyTerra 1 satellite from Baikonur Cosmodrome in Kazakhstan on November 14, 2010. At its launch, the satellite contained the largest commercial reflector antenna put into service. SkyTerra 1 replaced MSAT-1 and MSAT-2 as most of the data from the company's MSAT satellites relocated to SkyTerra 1.

The spectrum the company controls was originally set aside for satellite communications only. That changed in 2004 when the FCC granted approval for the company to augment its satellite network with cellphone towers on land (serving as an "ancillary terrestrial component," or ATC). In January 2011, the FCC approved a conditional waiver to allow the company to use its spectrum for land-based-only LTE communications if the company resolved GPS interference. The GPS industry, aviators and military claimed the company's use of its spectrum would interfere with their communications. In February 2012, the FCC proposed to suspend indefinitely the ATC authorization due to the interference issues with satellite services. Three months later, LightSquared filed for chapter 11 bankruptcy.

On December 7, 2015, the company emerged from bankruptcy as a new company under the control of Centerbridge Partners, Fortress Investment Group and JPMorgan Chase; Harbinger retained minority ownership. Also in December 2015, the company reached settlements with GPS companies Garmin, John Deere and Trimble Navigation to establish how the company and GPS companies can coexist.

The company announced its new name, Ligado Networks, on February 10, 2016.

=== LightSquared proposals ===
On March 1, 2001, Ligado Networks' predecessor, Mobile Satellite Ventures applied to the FCC to use a "combination of spot-beam satellites and terrestrial base stations."

In 2011, LightSquared's plan for standalone-terrestrial broadband services met resistance over potential interference issues with GPS systems. In a January 12, 2011, letter to the FCC, National Telecommunications and Information Administration (NTIA) chief Lawrence Strickling said that LightSquared's hybrid mobile broadband services raise "significant interference concerns" and that several federal agencies wanted the FCC to defer action on LightSquared until the concerns were addressed.

On January 20, 2011, GPS industry representatives sent a letter to the FCC, sharing a study by Garmin International that said "widespread, severe GPS jamming will occur" if LightSquared's plans were approved. The study used two GPS models and simulated LightSquared transmitters.

Testing showed that LightSquared's proposed ground-based transmissions could "overpower" the fainter GPS signals from space-based satellites. With the band close to those GPS signals, "GPS devices could pick up the stronger LightSquared signals and become overloaded or saturated".

On January 26, 2011, The Federal Communications Commission granted a conditional waiver that allowed LightSquared and its wholesale customers to offer terrestrial-only devices rather than having to incorporate both satellite and terrestrial services. The waiver was conditioned on resolving concerns about interference to GPS. Companies that provide global positioning systems, in addition to the United States Air Force, the operator of the GPS system, opposed the FCC waiver, saying that more time was needed to resolve concerns that LightSquared's service might interfere with their satellite-based offerings. LightSquared promised to work with GPS providers and give the FCC monthly updates on a resolution to interference concerns.

On April 5, 2011, with respect to concerns raised by the U.S. GPS Industry Council and NTIA about LightSquared's proposed operations, the FCC stated that LightSquared could not commence offering a commercial terrestrial service until the agency concluded that the harmful interference concerns had been resolved.

On February 14, 2012, the FCC initiated proceedings to vacate LightSquared's Conditional Waiver Order based on the NTIA's conclusion that there was currently no practical way to mitigate potential GPS interference.

=== Challenges in Congress ===
On September 15, 2011, Representative Michael Turner (R-Ohio) called for the United States House Oversight and Government Committee to investigate LightSquared under the premise that the Federal Communications Commission waived a rule for LightSquared because of campaign contributions to Democrats. LightSquared officials, who had contributed to both Republicans and Democrats, denied the allegations.

Among the issues raised was whether political contributors and investors received favorable treatment by President Barack Obama's administration. Before he became president, Senator Obama had invested between $50,000 and $90,000 in SkyTerra, which later became LightSquared. An Air Force General claimed in a closed congressional hearing that he had received political pressure to soften his testimony regarding the negative effects of LightSquared technology. However, the General's spokesperson denied there was any improper influence and said that the general's testimony was reviewed appropriately by the Office of the Secretary of Defense and other executive agencies via the established Office of Management and Budget process.

Sen. Chuck Grassley (R-Iowa), a ranking minority member on the United States Senate Committee on the Judiciary, had also asked Falcone and LightSquared's CEO to disclose their contacts with the FCC, the White House and other government agencies.
