= Jordan A. Thomas =

American attorney, writer, speaker and media commentator

- Jordan A. Thomas
- Education: Bennington College (BA); Southwestern Law School (JD)
- Occupations: Attorney, Whistleblower Advocate
- Years active: 1995–present
- Organization(s): Chair, SEC Whistleblower Advocates by DiCello Levitt LLP
- Website: http://www.secwhistlebloweradvocate.com/

Jordan Andolini Thomas (born Paul Thompson) is an American attorney, writer, speaker and media commentator. He leads the SEC Whistleblower Advocates team at DiCello Levitt LLP, where he represents whistleblowers reporting violations of the federal securities laws to the U.S. Securities and Exchange Commission (SEC).

Thomas began his legal career in the public sector as a Judge Advocate General in the U.S. Navy (1995–1999). Thomas then became a trial attorney for the U.S. Department of Justice (1999–2003), before being hired by the SEC where he rose to the position of Assistant Director after serving as Assistant Chief Litigation Counsel in the SEC's Division of Enforcement (2003–2011).

== Early life and education ==
Thomas was born in Los Angeles, California. His mother was a white former nun turned school teacher and his father was a black former judge turned fixer.

In an NPR interview, Thomas described his father as someone who believed "the world is rigged, the ends justify the means, and you're either pulling the strings or you're the puppet." In his early years, Thomas idolized his father and acknowledged that he was willing "to do illegal and unethical things" to earn his love. He came to see the error of those ways and has long since made clear: "I am not proud of it and have spent the better part of my life trying to make amends."

Thomas described reinventing himself as a young adult, "essentially putting myself into a witness protection program of my own making." He moved to Vermont to get away from his past life, legally changing his name to Jordan Andolini Thomas. Thomas chose his new first name because he admired Michael Jordan. He chose the middle name "Andolini" because it was the actual surname of the fictional Corleone crime family in The Godfather (novel), and Thomas related to Michael Corleone's efforts to break away from his corrupt family. His new last name was simply based on similarity to his given, prior last name of Thompson.

While in Vermont, Thomas attended Bennington College, where he received his B.A. He then earned his J.D. from Southwestern University School of Law.

== Professional history ==
=== SEC Enforcement experience ===
While at the SEC, Thomas played a role in the development of the SEC Whistleblower Program, established under the Dodd-Frank Wall Street Reform and Consumer Protection Act. Thomas also developed and served as the first National Coordinator of the SEC's Cooperation Program, designed to encourage individuals and companies to self-report violations of the federal securities laws and to participate in the SEC's investigations and enforcement actions.

=== Private whistleblower representation ===
After leaving the SEC, Thomas joined Labaton Sucharow LLP as a partner. He founded and chairs a national legal practice exclusively devoted to protecting and advocating for whistleblowers who report possible securities violations to the SEC. The practice, SEC Whistleblower Advocates, is now part of DiCello Levitt LLP.

In explaining his decision to leave the Commission, Thomas said, "I believe the SEC whistleblower program will revolutionize the way the SEC enforces the securities laws. And having helped give birth to the program, I would like to be part of seeing it be successful."

In private practice, he has risen to national prominence. The Wall Street Journal has described him as "one of the most prominent attorneys representing whistleblowers before the government." Likewise, NPR has referred to him as "one of the top whistleblower lawyers in the country." And the New York Times has described his team as "one of the top legal practices in the country representing corporate whistle-blowers." Over the years, he represented the first officer of a public company to win an SEC whistleblower award, the first SEC whistleblower to receive criminal immunity and the first SEC whistleblower to receive an award because his company retaliated against him. In 2018, his clients won the then-largest SEC Whistleblower award in history for a single case, $83 million.

=== Whistleblower cases ===
JPMorgan—Thomas represented a whistleblower responsible for the SEC and Commodity Futures Trading Commission's $307 million settlements with two J.P. Morgan wealth management subsidiaries in December 2015. The New York Times called the settlement a "black mark for JPMorgan's asset management division," which had over $1 trillion of assets under management. From 2008 to 2015, the subsidiaries failed to disclose numerous material conflicts of interest including, but not limited to, their preference for investing in the firm's more expensive proprietary investment products or third-party managed hedge funds that made payments to a JPMorgan affiliate.

Merrill Lynch—Thomas represented the whistleblowers responsible for the SEC's $415 million settlement with Merrill Lynch in June 2016. In discussing the importance of the record-setting settlement, Andrew Ceresney, the SEC Director of Enforcement, said "[t]he rules concerning the safety of customer cash and securities are fundamental protections for investors and impose lines that simply can never be crossed." From 2009 to 2015, Merrill Lynch misused customer cash to generate profits for the firm, failed to safeguard customer securities from the claims of creditors and used illegal secrecy agreements that impeded employees from voluntarily providing information to the SEC. The wrongdoing in this case led to a new industry-wide initiative by the Commission to find similar violations by other firms and was "by far the largest customer protection settlement in SEC history."

Visium Asset Management—Thomas represented the whistleblower responsible for the Department of Justice and SEC investigations of Visium Asset Management, an $8 billion hedge fund. The whistleblower had himself been part of the scheme he reported. Law enforcement and regulatory authorities charged that three rogue portfolio managers at the firm had mishandled the valuation of its credit portfolio, and that two of them had engaged in insider trading. The investigation led to the 2016 wind-down of a Wall Street behemoth and the successful criminal prosecution of one rogue trader, as a second rogue trader pleaded guilty. It was the most high-profile shutdown since Steve Cohen's SAC Capital closed in 2013.

Harbert Management—Thomas represented, with co-counsel from Getnick & Getnick LLP, the whistleblower responsible for the New York Attorney General's $40 million settlement with Alabama-based Harbert Management Corporation and top executives at the firm in April 2017. Harbert Management was the fund sponsor for Harbinger Capital Partners, a $26 billion hedge fund based in New York City. The settlement, the largest-ever recovery of its kind, resolved whistleblower allegations that members of Harbinger's investment manager failed to pay millions in New York State tax on performance income for several years. Attorney General Schneiderman praised the whistleblower's "vital assistance in bringing this matter to light" and stated, "our investigation uncovered a brazen and deliberate decision to avoid paying millions in taxes owed to New York State. Harbert Management made a clear choice to skirt the rules and as a result, ordinary New York taxpayers were left footing the bill."

Orthofix International—Thomas represented two whistleblowers responsible for the SEC's $8.25 million settlement with Orthofix International, a Texas-based medical device company, in January 2017. His clients, Wall Street analysts, tipped the government to the most serious charges facing the company, accounting failures that caused the company to materially misstate financial statements from at least 2011 to the first quarter of 2013. "Orthofix's accounting failures were widespread and significant, causing Orthofix to make false statements to the public about its financial condition," said Antonia Chion, Associate Director in the SEC's Enforcement Division.

=== Public whistleblower advocacy ===
Domestically, Thomas has lobbied key stakeholders to preserve the pillars of the SEC Whistleblower Program—anonymous reporting, employment protections and monetary awards. As an invited whistleblowing panelist, he contributed to the United States' Phase 4 Report Implementing the OECD Anti-Bribery Convention. Troubled by the use of secrecy agreements and retaliation to silence SEC whistleblowers, in partnership with the Government Accountability Project, he led a coalition of more than 250 organizations and nearly two million citizens to petition the SEC for action. Following this grassroots advocacy, the Commission has aggressively prosecuted numerous prominent companies for engaging in these illegal practices.

Internationally, Thomas has been invited to engagements at the United Nations, UK House of Commons and Australian Parliament. Following public hearings which included his testimony about the SEC Whistleblower Program and its potential application in Ontario, the Ontario Securities Commission established a whistleblower program. Similarly, after a review of the issue that included several international assistance visits by him and his testimony before the Joint Committee on Corporations and Financial Services, the Australian government agreed to introduce stronger corporate whistleblower protections and to conduct a parliamentary inquiry into the merits of introducing a corporate whistleblower program in Australia.

He is one of several prominent experts who are regularly quoted on whistleblower issues.

=== Other advocacy ===
He has served as the Chair of the Investor Rights Committee of the District of Columbia Bar and as a board member of the City Bar Justice Center, the pro bono affiliate of the New York City Bar Association. (2013–16).

== Awards and recognition ==
In 2026, Chambers and Partners ranked Thomas in Band 1 for Whistleblower Representation in the USA Nationwide category.

In 2020, Thomas was named to the "Enforcement 40" by Securities Docket, and to the "500 Leading Plaintiff Financial Lawyers" by Lawdragon, which has recognized him on the list every year since.

In 2019, Thomas was named a "Distinguished Leader" by the New York Law Journal, and a "Top Thought Leader In Trust" by Trust Across America.

In 2018, Thomas was named "Lawyer of the Year" by Taxpayers Against Fraud Educational Fund, a "Plaintiff Trailblazer" by the National Law Journal, an "MVP in Securities Law" by Law360, and was shortlisted for "Plaintiff Attorney of the Year" by Benchmark Litigation.

In 2017, Labaton Sucharow was shortlisted among the Financial Times Most Innovative North American Law Firms List as a "Standout" in the Rule of Law and Access to Justice category and Thomas was specifically identified for his work exposing corporate wrongdoing.

In both 2013 and 2012, the Ethisphere Institute named Thomas to its listing of "Attorneys Who Matter," which recognizes practitioners in the world of corporate ethics and compliance.

In 2012, Thomas was named a "Legal Rebel" by the American Bar Association Journal.

While at the SEC, Thomas received four Chairman's Awards, four Division Director's Awards and a Letter of Commendation from the United States Attorney for the District of Columbia.

Thomas was twice awarded the Rear Admiral Hugh H. Howell Award of Excellence.
