= Robert Daly (director) =

American diplomat

- Other names: 戴博
- Education: Syracuse University (B.A., 1984)
- Occupation: Director of the Kissinger Institute on China and the United States
- Employer: Wilson Center

Robert Daly is director of the Kissinger Institute on China and the United States at the Woodrow Wilson Center and a former US Foreign Service officer and actor.

== Early life and education ==
Daly grew up in Syracuse, New York and received his B.A. in literature from Syracuse University in 1984.

== Career ==
Between 1986 and 1991 Daly was a Foreign Service officer, also working as cultural exchange officer at the US Embassy in Beijing. After leaving the Foreign Service, he taught Chinese at Cornell University until 1992. Between 1992 and 1999, he worked as a host, actor, and writer on TV and theater projects in China and helped to produce Chinese language versions of U.S children TV series. Daly also directed the Syracuse University China Seminar and was as a commentator on Chinese affairs for CNN, the Voice of America, and Chinese television and radio stations. In 2000 and 2001 he served as director of the U.S.-China Housing Initiative.

Between 2001 and 2007, he was American Director of the Johns Hopkins University Nanjing University Center for Chinese and American Studies in Nanjing, China.

Between 2007 and 2013, Daly was director of the Maryland China Initiative of the University of Maryland. .

In August 2013, Robert Daly was named the second director of the Kissinger Institute on China and the United States at the Woodrow Wilson Center. He succeeded Ambassador J. Stapleton Roy, who directed the Kissinger Institute since its founding in 2008.

Daly has testified before Congress on China–United States relations lectured at the Smithsonian Institution, the East-West Center, the Asia Society, and the National Committee on United States–China Relations.

Daly lived in China for 11 years. He has interpreted for American and Chinese politicians, including Jimmy Carter, Henry Kissinger, Jiang Zemin, and Li Yuanchao.

Daly is a participant of the Task Force on U.S.-China Policy convened by Asia Society's Center on US-China Relations.

== TV actor ==
In 1992, Daly took part as an actor in a TV series called "Beijinger in New York", broadcast on 1 October 1994. People in China still recognize Daly for his role in the drama.
