= Daniel Josefsson =

Swedish ice hockey player

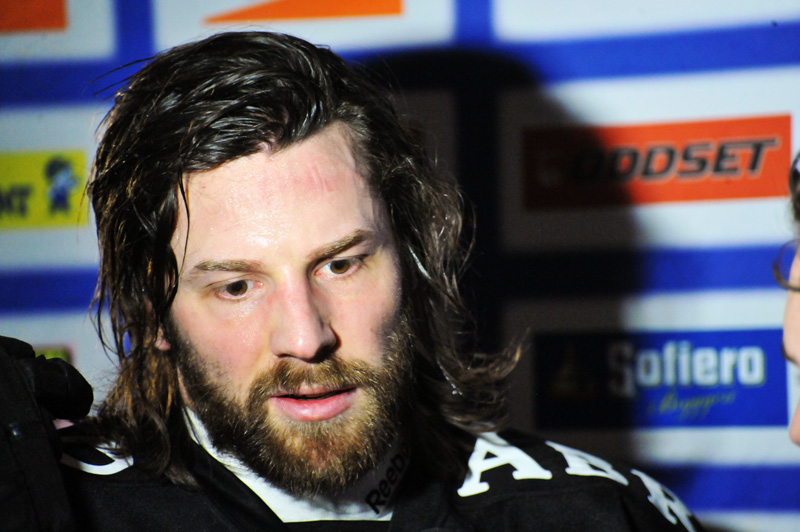
- Born: October 15, 1981 (age 44) Tranås, Sweden
- Height: 5 ft 11 in (180 cm)
- Weight: 194 lb (88 kg; 13 st 12 lb)
- Position: Defence
- Shot: Left
- Played for: HV71; Södertälje SK; Modo Hockey; AIK IF; Leksands IF; HC Vita Hästen
- Playing career: 2000–2019

Daniel Josefsson (born October 15, 1981) is a Swedish former professional ice hockey player who last played with HC Vita Hästen of the HockeyAllsvenskan (Allsv). Josefsson had previously played in the Swedish Hockey League (SHL) with HV71, Södertälje SK, Modo Hockey, AIK IF and Leksands IF.

== Career statistics ==
			Regular season					Playoffs
Season	Team	League	GP	G	A	Pts	PIM	GP	G	A	Pts	PIM
1997–98	HV71 J18	J18 Div.1	—	—	—	—	—	—	—	—	—	—
1997–98	HV71 J20	J20 SuperElit	12	0	3	3	2	—	—	—	—	—
1998–99	HV71 J18	J18 Elit	—	—	—	—	—	—	—	—	—	—
1998–99	HV71 J20	J20 SuperElit	—	—	—	—	—	—	—	—	—	—
1999–00	HV71 J20	J20 SuperElit	34	7	16	23	53	2	0	1	1	2
1999–00	HV71	Elitserien	4	0	0	0	0	2	0	0	0	0
2000–01	HV71 J20	J20 SuperElit	5	2	4	6	6	3	0	0	0	0
2000–01	HV71	Elitserien	18	1	1	2	4	—	—	—	—	—
2000–01	Tranås AIF	Allsvenskan	22	1	3	4	45	—	—	—	—	—
2001–02	HV71	Elitserien	48	1	1	2	29	8	0	0	0	0
2002–03	Rögle BK	Allsvenskan	38	10	10	20	10	10	1	2	3	8
2002–03	HV71	Elitserien	4	0	0	0	0	—	—	—	—	—
2003–04	Rögle BK	Allsvenskan	45	6	15	21	26	—	—	—	—	—
2004–05	Rögle BK	Allsvenskan	42	4	12	16	14	2	0	0	0	0
2005–06	Rögle BK	HockeyAllsvenskan	38	4	4	8	10	10	0	0	0	4
2006–07	Södertälje SK	HockeyAllsvenskan	45	6	18	24	14	10	3	1	4	0
2007–08	Södertälje SK	Elitserien	51	2	6	8	16	—	—	—	—	—
2008–09	Södertälje SK	Elitserien	26	0	3	3	10	—	—	—	—	—
2009–10	Södertälje SK	Elitserien	53	2	9	11	71	—	—	—	—	—
2010–11	Modo Hockey	Elitserien	45	1	6	7	6	—	—	—	—	—
2011–12	Malmö Redhawks	HockeyAllsvenskan	44	2	5	7	12	5	0	0	0	0
2012–13	AIK IF	Elitserien	30	1	2	3	10	—	—	—	—	—
2013–14	AIK IF	SHL	47	1	5	6	28	—	—	—	—	—
2014–15	Leksands IF	SHL	40	2	4	6	12	—	—	—	—	—
2015–16	HC Vita Hästen	HockeyAllsvenskan	34	2	9	11	10	—	—	—	—	—
2016–17	HC Vita Hästen	HockeyAllsvenskan	46	0	2	2	32	—	—	—	—	—
2017–18	HC Vita Hästen	HockeyAllsvenskan	45	3	3	6	26	—	—	—	—	—
2018–19	HC Vita Hästen	HockeyAllsvenskan	28	1	1	2	18	—	—	—	—	—
SHL (Elitserien) totals			366	11	37	48	186	10	0	0	0	0
HockeyAllsvenskan totals			280	18	42	60	122	25	3	1	4	4
Allsvenskan totals			147	21	40	61	95	12	1	2	3	8
