= Alexander Mirtchev =

American economist

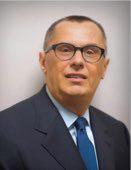
- Alexander Mirtchev
- Education: LLM, George Washington University, Ph.D., St. Kliment Ohridski University
- Occupations: Academic, Business Executive, Author

Alexander Mirtchev is an American academic, executive, and author whose work focuses on geopolitics, geoeconomics, global economic security, and political risk analysis and mitigation. He serves as vice chair of the Atlantic Council of the United States, where he is a member of the executive and strategy committees and the advisory council of the Scowcroft Center for Strategy and Security. He is a visiting professor at George Mason University's Schar School of Government and Policy.

Mirtchev is a founding council member of the Kissinger Institute on China and the United States at the Woodrow Wilson International Center for Scholars, where he previously served as a senior fellow and member of the Wilson National Cabinet. He has also served as vice president of the Royal United Services Institute for Defense and Security Studies (RUSI), in the United Kingdom and as executive chairman of RUSI International.

He is the president and founder of Krull Corp., a macro-economic geopolitical consultancy. He is the author of "The Prologue: The Alternative Energy Megatrend in the Age of Great Power Competition," which has been published in multiple languages.

== Early life and education ==
Mirtchev earned an LL.M. in international and comparative law from George Washington University in 1992 and a Ph.D. in philosophy from St. Kliment Ohridski University in 1983, where he later served as an associate professor. He also studied economics and finance at the London School of Economics and Harvard Business School, and political science at Boston University.

== Academic life and public policy domain ==
Mirtchev is a visiting professor at the Schar School of Government and Policy at George Mason University, where he has previously held the positions of professorial fellow and distinguished senior fellow.

He currently serves as a vice chair of the Atlantic Council of the United States and is a member of its board of directors, executive and strategy committees, and the advisory board to the Scowcroft Center for Strategy and Security. From 2010 to 2016, he served as a vice president of the Royal United Services Institute for Defense and Security in the United Kingdom and as the executive chairman of RUSI International. He is also a member of The Royal Institute of International Affairs, commonly known as Chatham House.

Mirtchev has been affiliated with the Woodrow Wilson International Center for Scholars. In 2008, he participated in the establishment of the Kissinger Institute on China and the United States and serves as a founding council member. From 2012 to 2017, he served on the Wilson National Cabinet, and he has also held the position of a senior fellow at the Wilson Center.

Since 2014, he has been a member of Friends of Fletcher Society at Tufts University. He has received honorary doctorates from the University of Foreign Trade and Finance in Kyiv, Ukraine, and other academic institutions.

== Business life ==
Mirtchev is the president of Krull Corp., a macroeconomic consultancy that he founded in 1992. From 1993 to 1999, he served as director of the International Business and Investment Division at the Law Offices of Stewart & Stewart in Washington, D.C. In 2007, he was appointed as an independent director and chairman of the Sustainable Development Fund 'Kazyna'. He also served as a chairman of Global Options Management, a risk-mitigation services joint venture with GlobalOptions, prior to its acquisition by Walker Digital, LLC.

== Media and publications ==
Mirtchev is the author of "The Prologue: The Alternative Energy Megatrend in the Age of Great Power Competition" which examines the relationship between alternative energy, geopolitics, and national security. The book has been published in English, Spanish, Russian and German. He has also authored several monographs and numerous policy articles on geopolitics, geo-economics, global economic security, energy security, political risk analysis and mitigation, including "The Greening of Geopolitics," "Our Best New Foreign Policy Tool: Energy," and "La finance sur le sentier de la guerre," among others.

Mirtchev has appeared as an analyst on media outelts, including BBC News, Reuters, Bloomberg, CNBC, Al Jazeera English, Voice of America, and E&ETV. He previously served as a member of the Fox Business Wall Street Week Advisory Board. He is an executive editor of the Atlantic Council Strategy Papers.

He also authored the introduction to Lee Kuan Yew's memoir "From Third World to First: The Singapore Story, 1965–2000, which includes a foreword by Henry Kissinger."
