= 2008 Kvalserien =

Swedish ice hockey league season

The 2008 Kvalserien was played between 19 March and 10 April 2008. The top two ranked teams, which were Brynäs and Rögle, qualified for the 2008–09 Elitserien season.

This year's Kvalserien maybe was one of the closest ones ever; the excitement went on until the end, when 4 out of 6 teams all had 16 points before the final round and had the chance to qualify for the 2008–09 Elitserien season. In the final round, Rögle beat former Elitserien club Mora at home 3–2 and Brynäs beat Västerås away 7–0, which made Brynäs win the group, followed by Rögle. Before the qualification began, no one believed Rögle could qualify, but they surprised everyone and qualified for the 2008–09 Elitserien season, despite finishing only third in HockeyAllsvenskan. Brynäs finished last in the 2007–08 Elitserien season, but succeeded to win the qualification and thus managed to stay in the highest division. Rögle's game-winning goal against Mora in the final round was scored with 26 seconds left of regulation time.

Leksand were a big disappointment for everyone; they were one of the favourites to have a possibility to qualify, but failed. Even Malmö were one of the favourites, having 15 points after the first six rounds and topping the Kvalserien at that time, but the team only managed two more points in the last four games.

Västerås was by far the worst team in the qualification. They were the 5th team in HockeyAllsvenskan and qualified for the qualification in a kind-of-playoff series between the teams from 4 to 7 in HockeyAllsvenskan to compete for the last spot in the qualification rounds for Elitserien. Västerås' only win in the 2008 Kvalserien came against Malmö.

== Standings ==
| # | Teams | GP | W | L | T | OTW | OTL | GF | GA | DIF | PTS |
|---|---|---|---|---|---|---|---|---|---|---|---|
| 1 | Brynäs IF (Q) | 10 | 6 | 3 | 1 | 0 | 0 | 40 | 23 | +17 | 19 |
| 2 | Rögle BK (Q) | 10 | 6 | 3 | 1 | 0 | 0 | 39 | 35 | +5 | 19 |
| 3 | Malmö Redhawks | 10 | 5 | 3 | 1 | 0 | 1 | 35 | 30 | +5 | 17 |
| 4 | Mora IK | 10 | 5 | 4 | 1 | 0 | 0 | 26 | 26 | 0 | 16 |
| 5 | Leksands IF | 10 | 4 | 5 | 0 | 1 | 0 | 34 | 30 | +4 | 14 |
| 6 | Västerås HK | 10 | 1 | 9 | 0 | 0 | 0 | 15 | 46 | −31 | 3 |

Q = Qualified for the 2008–09 Elitserien season

== Game log ==
2008 Kvalserien game log
March

| Round | Date | Home | Visitor | Result | Venue | Attendance |
|---|---|---|---|---|---|---|
| 1 | Wednesday, March 19 | Brynäs IF | VIK Västerås HK | 4–2 | Läkerol Arena | 5,360 |
| 1 | Wednesday, March 19 | Malmö Redhawks | Leksands IF | 3–0 | Malmö Isstadion | 5,388 |
| 1 | Wednesday, March 19 | Mora IK | Rögle BK | 2–1 | FM Mattsson Arena | 3,871 |
| 2 | Friday, March 21 | Rögle BK | Malmö Redhawks | 5–3 | Ängelholms Ishall | 4,185 |
| 2 | Friday, March 21 | Leksands IF | Brynäs IF | 2–3 | Ejendals Arena | 7,650 |
| 2 | Friday, March 21 | VIK Västerås HK | Mora IK | 1–3 | ABB Arena | 5,035 |
| 3 | Sunday, March 23 | Brynäs IF | Rögle BK | 6–1 | Läkerol Arena | 6,116 |
| 3 | Sunday, March 23 | IF Malmö Redhawks | Mora IK | 4–1 | Malmö Isstadion | 3,924 |
| 3 | Monday, March 24 | Leksands IF | Västerås IK | 9–1 | Ejendals Arena | 7,427 |
| 4 | Thursday, March 27 | Mora IK | Brynäs IF | 2–2 | FM Mattsson Arena | 4,112 |
| 4 | Thursday, March 27 | Rögle BK | Leksands IF | 2–5 | Ängelholms Ishall | 4,184 |
| 4 | Thursday, March 27 | VIK Västerås HK | IF Malmö Redhawks | 1–2 | ABB Arena | 2,791 |
| 5 | Saturday, March 29 | Brynäs IF | IF Malmö Redhawks | 2–3 | Läkerol Arena | 6,293 |
| 5 | Saturday, March 29 | Rögle BK | VIK Västerås HK | 7–4 | Ängelholms Ishall | 2,258 |
| 5 | Saturday, March 29 | Leksands IF | Mora IK | 2–0 | Ejendals Arena | 7,650 |

April

| Round | Date | Home | Visitor | Result | Venue | Attendance |
|---|---|---|---|---|---|---|
| 6 | Tuesday, April 1 | IF Malmö Redhawks | Brynäs IF | 7–5 | Malmö Isstadion | 5,673 |
| 6 | Tuesday, April 1 | Mora IK | Leksands IF | 4–3 | FM Mattsson Arena | 4,500 |
| 6 | Tuesday, April 1 | VIK Västerås HK | Rögle BK | 2–4 | ABB Arena | 1,532 |
| 7 | Friday, April 4 | Brynäs IF | Mora IK | 6–2 | Läkerol Arena | 6,704 |
| 7 | Friday, April 4 | IF Malmö Redhawks | VIK Västerås HK | 1–2 | Malmö Isstadion | 4,837 |
| 7 | Friday, April 4 | Leksands IF | Rögle BK | 4–8 | Ejendals Arena | 7,650 |
| 8 | Sunday, April 6 | Mora IK | IF Malmö Redhawks | 5–4 | FM Mattsson Arena | 3,478 |
| 8 | Sunday, April 6 | Rögle BK | Brynäs IF | 4–2 | Ängelholms Ishall | 4,600 |
| 8 | Sunday, April 6 | VIK Västerås HK | Leksands IF | 2–4 | ABB Arena | 4,918 |
| 9 | Tuesday, April 8 | Brynäs IF | Leksands IF | 3–0 | Läkerol Arena | 8,214 |
| 9 | Tuesday, April 8 | IF Malmö Redhawks | Rögle BK | 4–4 | Malmö Isstadion | 5,800 |
| 9 | Tuesday, April 8 | Mora IK | VIK Västerås HK | 5–0 | FM Mattsson Arena | 4,111 |
| 10 | Thursday, April 10 | Rögle BK | Mora IK | 3–2 | Ängelholms Ishall | 4,600 |
| 10 | Thursday, April 10 | Leksands IF | IF Malmö Redhawks | 5–4 (OT) | Ejendals Arena | 6,198 |
| 10 | Thursday, April 10 | VIK Västerås HK | Brynäs IF | 0–7 | ABB Arena | 5,103 |
