= Peter Luukko =

American ice hockey executive (born 1959)

Peter A. Luukko
- Born: 1959 (age 66–67); Boston, Massachusetts, U.S.
- Occupation: NHL Executive
- Years active: 1994-present

Peter A. Luukko (born 1959) is an American ice hockey executive. He is currently an executive chairman with the Florida Panthers of the National Hockey League (NHL) and serves on their board of governors.

In his capacity as president and chief operating officer of Comcast Spectacor, Luukko was the long-serving president of the Philadelphia Flyers of the NHL, a position he held until December 2013. In February 2014, Luukko accepted a position on the board of Pointstreaks, a sports technology company. He then joined the Florida Panthers as executive chairman in February 2015.

His son, Nick, was drafted by the Flyers in the sixth round of the 2010 NHL entry draft. Nick played parts of five seasons in the American Hockey League and ECHL and was named head coach and director of hockey operations for the ECHL's Jacksonville Icemen in 2021.
