= Leif Strömberg =

Swedish ice hockey player and coach

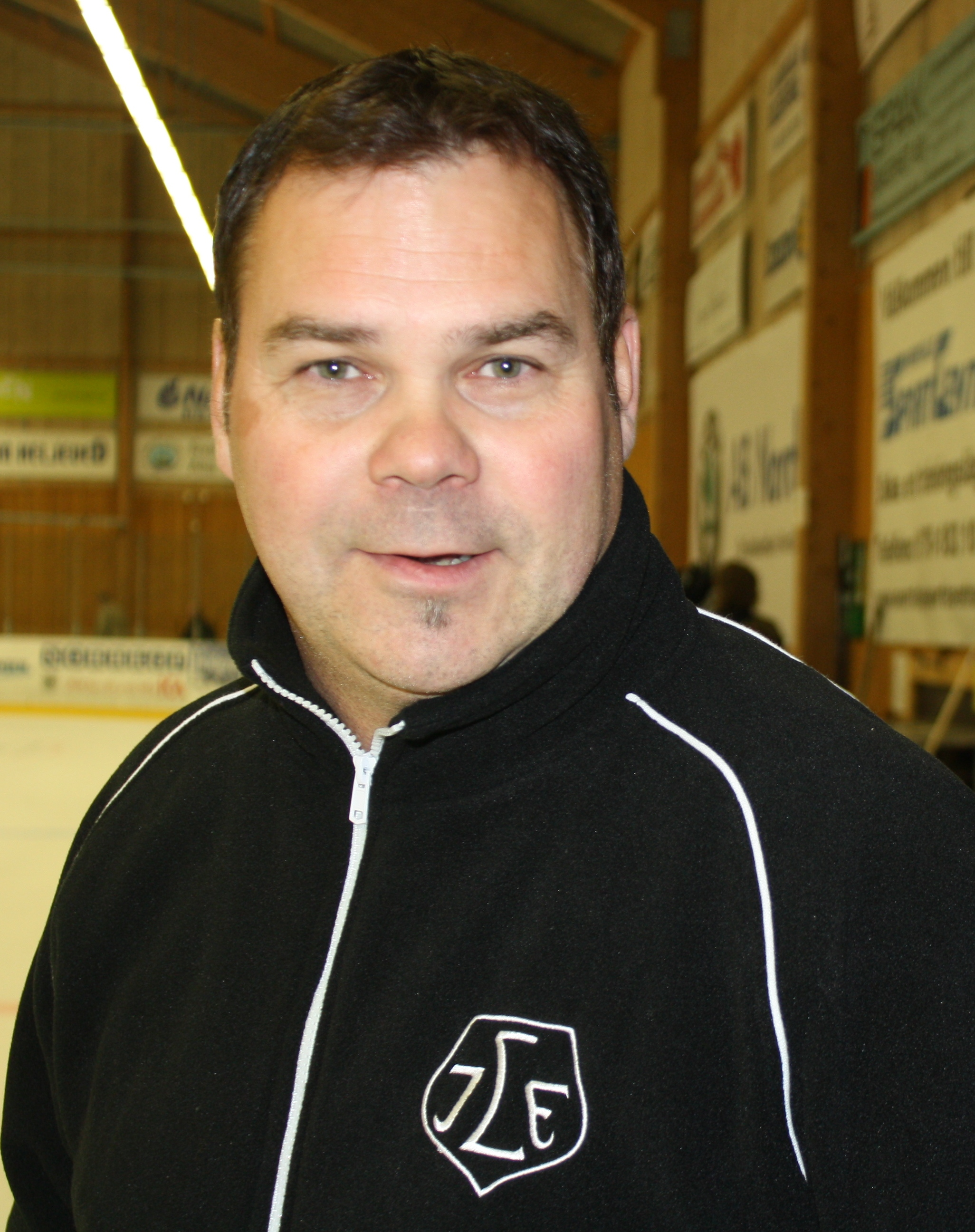
- Leif Strömberg in 2009.
- Born: January 4, 1962 (age 63); Stockholm, Sweden
- Height: 5 ft 9.3 in (176 cm)
- Weight: 168 lb (76 kg; 12 st 0 lb)
- Position: Defence & Forward
- Shot: Right
- Played for: Hammarby IF (J18) (1976–1978); Hammarby IF (J20) (1978-1979); Djurgårdens IF (J20) (1979-1980); Hammarby IF (J20) (1980-1981); Tingsryds AIF (J20) (1981-1982); Tyringe SoSS (1982-1983); Tingsryds AIF (1983-1984); Olofströms IK (1983-1984); Nybro IF (1984-1987); Lidingö HC (1987-1988); Nyköpings BIS (1988-1990); IK Göta (1990-1992); MB Hockey (1992-1993)
- Coached for: IK Göta (1993–1996); Hanvikens SK (1996–1998); MB Hockey (1998–2000); Bofors IK (2000–2004); Färjestad BK (2004–2006); Södertälje SK (2005–2009); Leksands IF (2009–2010); Malmö Redhawks (2011–2012); IF Sundsvall Hockey (2015–2016); Stjernen Hockey (2017–2018); HC Vita Hästen (2017–2019); CS Progym Gheorgheni (2019–2020); Krefeld Pinguine (2022)
- Playing career: 1976–1993

Leif Strömberg (born January 4, 1962, in Stockholm) is a Swedish ice hockey coach and former ice hockey player (forward and defence). Within Swedish hockey, he is regarded as an unconventional coach and a colorful character. Besides having coached a long list of Swedish teams he has an international coaching career. His latest international job was as head coach for German Krefeld Pinguine in 2022. Strömberg has often also worked as general manager for the clubs he has been the head coach for.

== Playing career ==
Leif Strömberg, nicknamed "Strumpan" = "The Sock", started his professional career in Hammarby IF's J18- and J20-teams, went on to Djurgårdens IF J20-team, and then back again to Hammarby. Following this, he had a long career away from Stockholm in several different teams in the Swedish Hockeyettan and Hockeytvåan leagues, and finally ended his career back in Stockholm again with Mälarhöjden/Bredäng Hockey / MB Hockey.

== Coaching career ==
Strömberg started as a coach in 1993 for IK Göta, the same year he ended his career as a professional player. He's worked as a coach all over Sweden, the longest stint being in Karlskoga for Bofors IK. In 2017 he began his international career as head coach for Norwegian Stjernen Hockey, and has worked as head coach in Romania and Germany too.

== Personal life ==
Tragedy struck Strömberg early in his coaching career as he lost his fiancé Karin to cancer on January 19, 2000. Working both as head coach and general manager for Bofors IK he was left alone with their young daughter Sofia.

Besides his career as a professional player and coach, Strömberg has been an expert TV commentator for several Swedish channels.
