= Alexander Ribbenstrand =

Swedish ice hockey player

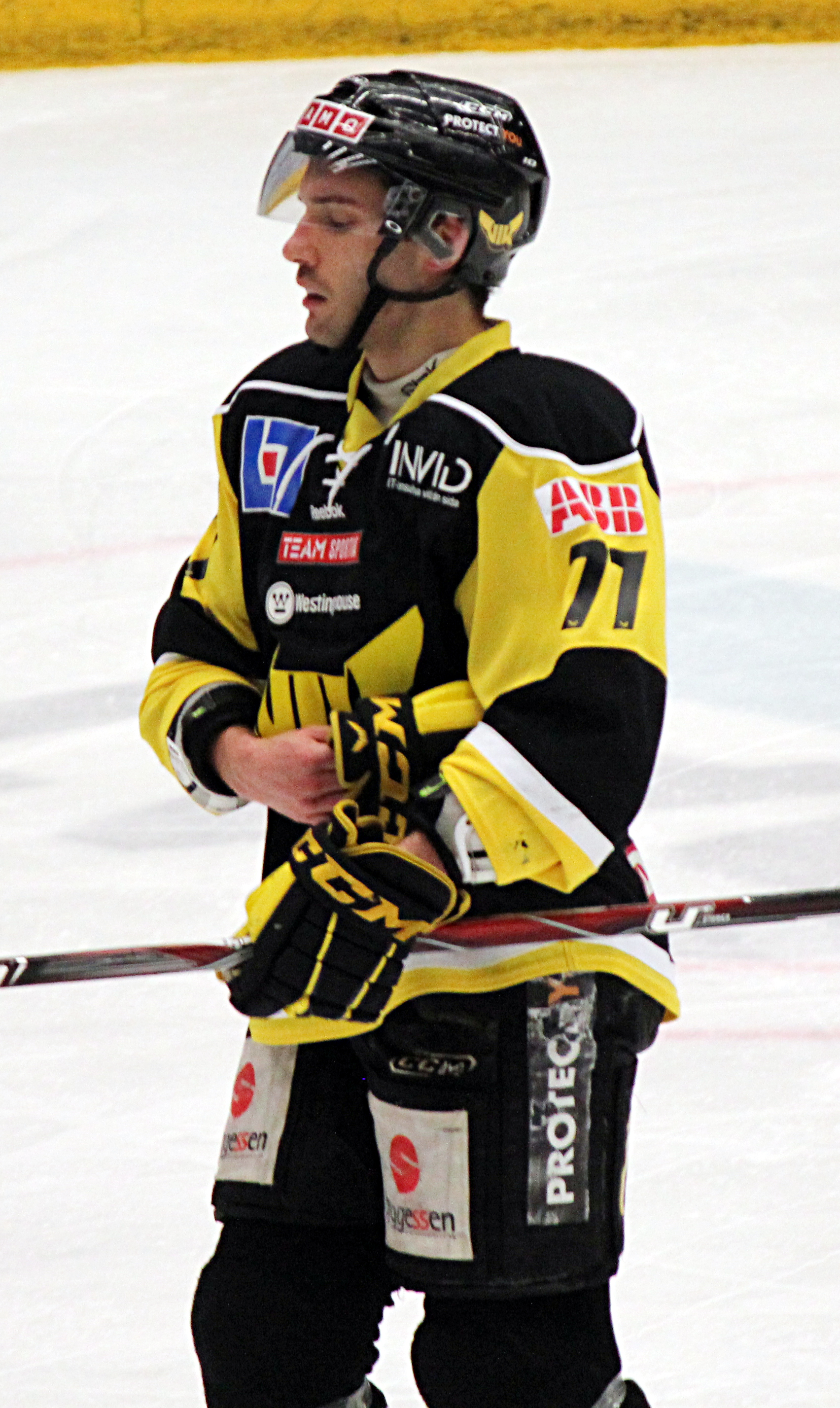
- Born: January 9, 1987 (age 39) Stockholm, Sweden
- Height: 6 ft 0 in (183 cm)
- Weight: 198 lb (90 kg; 14 st 2 lb)
- Position: Defence
- Shoots: Left
- team Former teams: Free Agent; Djurgårdens IF Hockey; Lørenskog IK; Ässät Pori; SønderjyskE Ishockey
- Playing career: 2005–present

Alexander Ribbenstrand (born January 9, 1987) is a Swedish professional ice hockey defenceman. He is currently an unrestricted free agent who most recently played with SønderjyskE Ishockey in the Danish Metal Ligaen.

Ribbenstrand made his Elitserien debut playing with Djurgårdens IF Hockey during the 2005–06 Elitserien season.

== Career statistics ==
			Regular season					Playoffs
Season	Team	League	GP	G	A	Pts	PIM	GP	G	A	Pts	PIM
2002–03	AIK IF J18	J18 Allsvenskan	14	1	1	2	28	—	—	—	—	—
2003–04	AIK IF J20	J20 SuperElit	32	1	4	5	46	—	—	—	—	—
2004–05	Djurgårdens IF J18	J18 Elit	1	0	0	0	0	—	—	—	—	—
2004–05	Djurgårdens IF J18	J18 Allsvenskan	2	1	0	1	0	6	0	1	1	54
2004–05	Djurgårdens IF J20	J20 SuperElit	29	3	10	13	89	—	—	—	—	—
2005–06	Djurgårdens IF J20	J20 SuperElit	2	0	0	0	6	4	1	0	1	8
2005–06	Djurgårdens IF	Elitserien	45	1	3	4	73	—	—	—	—	—
2006–07	Djurgårdens IF J20	J20 SuperElit	7	0	2	2	10	7	0	2	2	10
2006–07	Djurgårdens IF	Elitserien	45	2	3	5	60	—	—	—	—	—
2006–07	Almtuna IS	HockeyAllsvenskan	2	1	0	1	0	—	—	—	—	—
2007–08	Almtuna IS	HockeyAllsvenskan	45	3	5	8	100	—	—	—	—	—
2008–09	Almtuna IS	HockeyAllsvenskan	43	1	10	11	129	6	0	1	1	8
2009–10	VIK Västerås HK	HockeyAllsvenskan	50	4	7	11	91	—	—	—	—	—
2010–11	VIK Västerås HK	HockeyAllsvenskan	42	3	10	13	26	6	0	0	0	2
2011–12	Malmö Redhawks	HockeyAllsvenskan	16	0	0	0	12	—	—	—	—	—
2012–13	Malmö Redhawks	HockeyAllsvenskan	8	0	0	0	2	—	—	—	—	—
2012–13	IK Pantern	Hockeyettan	7	2	2	4	2	—	—	—	—	—
2012–13	Lørenskog IK	Norway	6	1	0	1	25	12	1	0	1	8
2013–14	Porin Ässät	Liiga	9	0	0	0	4	—	—	—	—	—
2013–14	Mora IK	HockeyAllsvenskan	34	2	5	7	79	—	—	—	—	—
2014–15	IF Björklöven	HockeyAllsvenskan	20	0	1	1	16	—	—	—	—	—
2014–15	SønderjyskE Ishockey	Denmark	9	1	1	2	6	6	0	1	1	8
2017–18	Stortorparna IF	Division 3	14	7	3	10	10	—	—	—	—	—
2021–22	Brödernas Hockey	Division 4	19	11	16	27	18	3	1	4	5	0
2022–23	Brödernas Hockey	Division 3	19	6	15	21	10	9	5	3	8	41
Elitserien totals			90	3	6	9	133	—	—	—	—	—
Liiga totals			9	0	0	0	4	—	—	—	—	—
Norway totals			6	1	0	1	25	12	1	0	1	8
Denmark totals			9	1	1	2	6	6	0	1	1	8
HockeyAllsvenskan totals			260	14	38	52	455	12	0	1	1	10
