= Patrik Sylvegård =

- Born: 10 June 1966 (age 60) Örebro, Sweden
- Height: 6 ft 2 in (188 cm)
- Weight: 209 lb (95 kg; 14 st 13 lb)
- Position: Right winger
- Shot: Left
- Played for: Malmö IF (SEL); Örebro IK; Limhamn Limeburners HC
- Playing career: 1984–2002

Patrik Sylvegård (born July 10, 1966) is a former ice hockey player, currently working as the CEO for Malmö Redhawks of the SHL. During his career he represented three teams: Örebro IK, Malmö Redhawks and Limhamn Limeburners HC. He has current record of most goals scored in Malmö Redhawks with 171 goals

== Playing career ==
He is one of Malmö Redhawks best players of all time. He is known for his tough style of play. He has won the Elitserien (SEL) two times in 1991-92 and 1993–94. He has also won the IIHF European Champions Cup once in 1993. Malmö Redhawks has retired his No. 18 jersey.

== Career statistics ==
			Regular season					Playoffs
Season	Team	League	GP	G	A	Pts	PIM	GP	G	A	Pts	PIM
1984–85	Örebro IK	SWE II	10	0	3	3	0	—	—	—	—	—
1985–86	Örebro IK	SWE II	5	0	1	1	0	—	—	—	—	—
1986–87	Örebro IK	SWE II	17	3	1	4	6	3	0	0	0	2
1987–88	Malmö IF	SWE II	31	27	27	54	24	3	0	3	3	4
1988–89	Malmö IF	SWE II	31	32	19	51	42	13	10	5	15	12
1989–90	Malmö IF	SWE II	35	41	20	61	38	3	1	1	2	2
1990–91	Malmö IF	SEL	39	12	6	18	65	2	1	0	1	0
1991–92	Malmö IF	SEL	36	4	5	9	18	10	1	1	2	4
1992–93	Malmö IF	SEL	38	9	12	21	25	6	1	0	1	4
1993–94	Malmö IF	SEL	37	8	11	19	32	11	2	2	4	6
1994–95	Malmö IF	SEL	31	9	6	15	12	—	—	—	—	—
1995–96	Malmö IF	SEL	39	6	4	10	28	4	0	0	0	2
1996–97	MIF Redhawks	SEL	35	9	6	15	26	4	3	1	4	2
1997–98	MIF Redhawks	SEL	33	7	14	21	54	—	—	—	—	—
1998–99	MIF Redhawks	SEL	48	7	10	17	28	8	0	0	0	0
SWE II totals			129	103	71	174	110	22	11	9	20	20
SEL totals			336	71	74	145	288	45	8	4	12	18
