= Tomas Kollar =

Swedish ice hockey player (born 1982)

- Born: April 20, 1982 (age 42); Stockholm, Sweden
- Height: 6 ft 2 in (188 cm)
- Weight: 211 lb (96 kg; 15 st 1 lb)
- Position: Left wing
- Shot: Left
- Played for: Hammarby IF; Djurgårdens IF; Skellefteå AIK; Södertälje SK; Leksands IF; Malmö Redhawks
- Current SHL coach: Malmö Redhawks
- NHL draft: 226th overall, 2003; Detroit Red Wings
- Playing career: 2000–2014
- Coaching career: 2020–present

Tomas Kollar (born April 20, 1982 in Stockholm, Sweden) is a professional Swedish ice hockey coach and former player. He is currently serving as head coach for Malmö Redhawks in the SHL. As a player, he represented Hammarby IF, Djurgårdens IF Hockey, Skellefteå AIK, Södertälje SK, Leksands IF and then lastly Malmö Redhawks whom after finishing his playing career in 2014 continued as a youth coach with J18 and since has served the club through its youth ranks and up to the first team.

== Career statistics ==
			Regular season					Playoffs
Season	Team	League	GP	G	A	Pts	PIM	GP	G	A	Pts	PIM
1999–2000	Hammarby IF	J20	36	6	12	18	50	6	4	3	7	2
2000–01	Hammarby IF	J20	8	2	4	6	12	—	—	—	—	—
2000–01	Hammarby IF	Allsv	31	3	2	5	14	7	1	0	1	0
2001–02	Hammarby IF	J20	3	0	3	3	6	—	—	—	—	—
2001–02	Hammarby IF	Allsv	46	9	9	18	24	2	3	0	3	2
2002–03	Hammarby IF	Allsv	41	13	9	22	55	8	2	4	6	8
2003–04	Djurgårdens IF	SEL	50	6	8	14	22	4	0	0	0	0
2004–05	Skellefteå AIK	Allsv	17	9	5	14	16	—	—	—	—	—
2004–05	Djurgårdens IF	SEL	32	1	6	7	46	12	0	1	1	30
2005–06	Södertälje SK	SEL	50	7	8	15	111	—	—	—	—	—
2006–07	Södertälje SK	Allsv	32	12	13	25	90	10	3	5	8	8
2007–08	Södertälje SK	SEL	47	5	8	13	34	—	—	—	—	—
2008–09	Södertälje SK	SEL	55	6	19	25	18	—	—	—	—	—
2009–10	Leksands IF	Allsv	52	10	31	41	46	10	1	5	6	4
2010–11	Leksands IF	Allsv	26	6	9	15	8	6	0	1	1	2
2011–12	Malmö Redhawks	Allsv	50	11	12	23	63	6	2	7	9	2
2012–13	Malmö Redhawks	Allsv	52	6	14	20	60	—	—	—	—	—
2013–14	Malmö Redhawks	Allsv	52	2	7	9	24	10	0	0	0	0
Allsv totals			399	81	111	192	400	59	12	22	34	26
SEL totals			234	24	49	74	231	16	0	1	1	30
