= SEC Office of the Whistleblower =

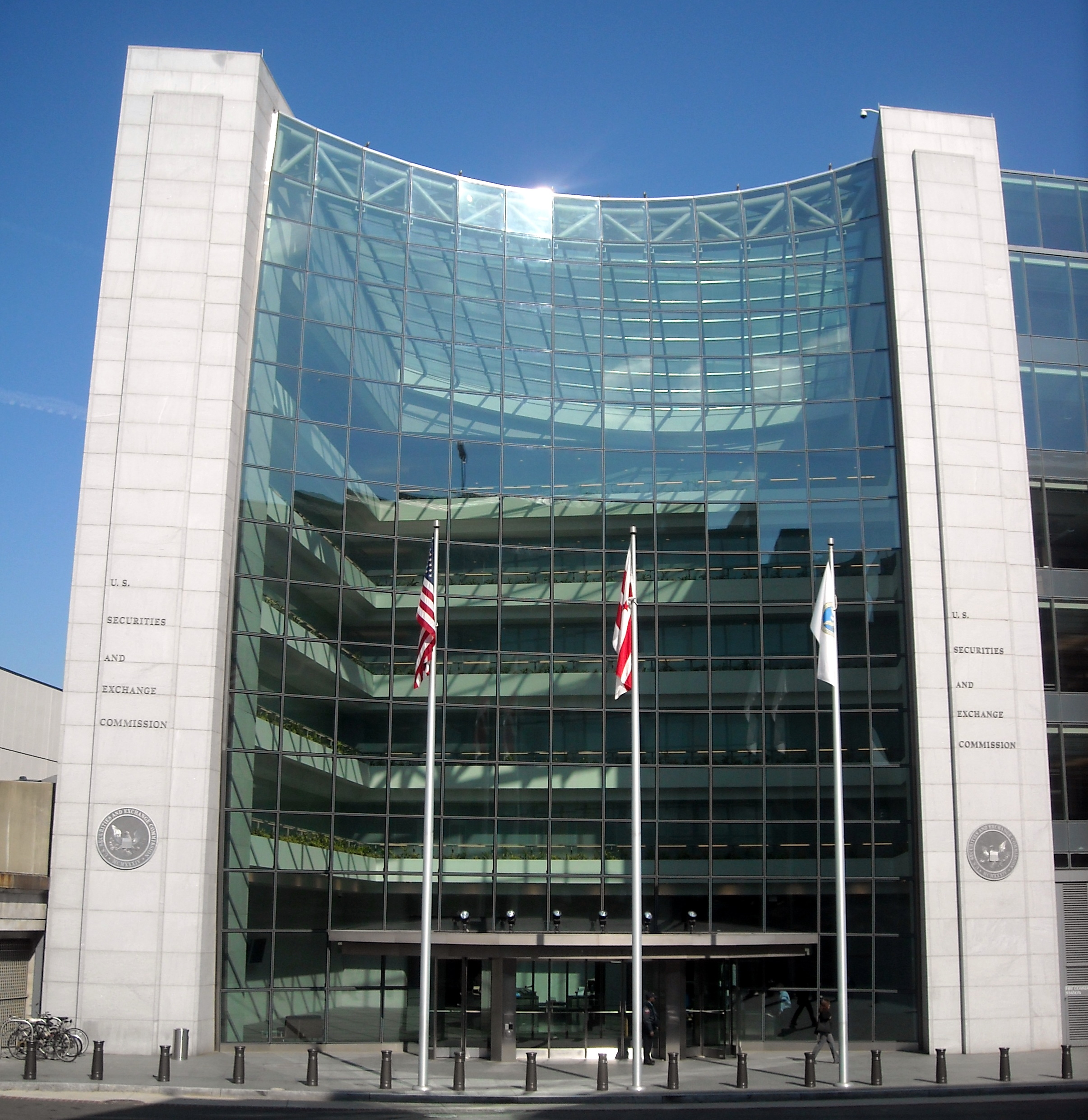
The Securities and Exchange Commission in Washington, D.C., near Washington Union Station

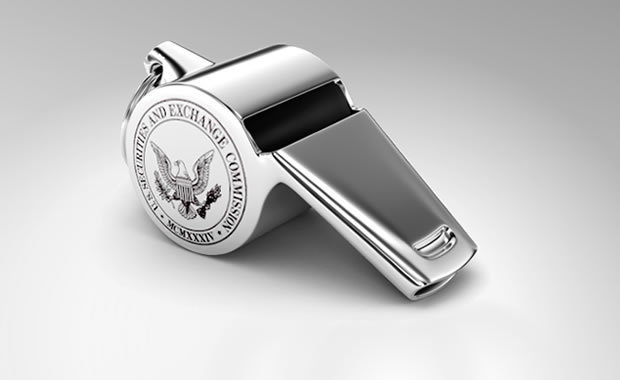
Symbol of the SEC Office of the Whistleblower

The U.S. Securities and Exchange Commission (SEC) whistleblower program went into effect on July 21, 2010, when the President signed into law the Dodd-Frank Wall Street Reform and Consumer Protection Act. The same law also established a whistleblower incentive program at the Commodity Futures Trading Commission to incentivize reporting of violations of the Commodity Exchange Act, which is run by former senior SEC enforcement attorney Christopher C. Ehrman. The SEC Whistleblower Program rewards people who submit tips related to violations of the federal securities laws. The program offers robust employment protections, monetary awards and the ability to report anonymously. SEC whistleblowers are entitled to awards ranging from 10 to 30 percent of the monetary sanctions collected, which are paid from a replenishing Investor Protection Fund. Since 2011, whistleblower tips have enabled the SEC to recover over $4.8 billion in financial penalties from wrongdoers. The SEC has awarded more than $1 billion to whistleblowers. The largest SEC whistleblower awards to date are $279 million, $114 million, $110 million, and $86 million.

== Overview ==
While the SEC had in place a bounty program for more than 20 years to reward whistleblowers for insider trading tips and complaints, an Office of the Inspector General's 2013 report found that the SEC's old program received very few applications from individuals seeking a bounty, and there were very few payments made under the program, possibly because the program was not widely recognized. The report also determined the program was not well-designed. After the 2008 financial crisis and the Madoff investment scandal, in July 2010, the SEC's bounty program was significantly enhanced after the President signed Dodd-Frank into law. Specifically, Section 922 of Dodd-Frank amended the Securities Exchange Act of 1934 (Exchange Act) by adding Section 21F, which created the SEC Whistleblower Program and the SEC Whistleblower Office.

Under the new whistleblower program, the SEC is authorized to make monetary awards to whistleblowers who voluntarily provide original information that leads to successful enforcement actions resulting in monetary sanctions over $1,000,000. Under the program, a whistleblower may receive an award of between 10 and 30 percent of the monetary sanctions collected.

The SEC's new whistleblower program represents a major benefit over other whistleblower reward programs that do not allow anonymous submissions, such as the IRS whistleblower program. Anonymous whistleblowers must sign a declaration in their complaint under the penalty of perjury "that the information contained herein is true, correct and complete to the best of my knowledge, information and belief." Whistleblower's attorneys are responsible for the retaining the original, signed copy of the declaration.

According to the 2017 Annual Report to Congress on the Dodd-Frank Whistleblower Program, a majority of tips received by the SEC related to corporate disclosures and financials (19 percent), offering fraud (18 percent), and manipulation (12 percent). The states that yielded the highest number of tips in Fiscal Year 2017 were California, New York, Texas, Florida, and New Jersey. The countries that yielded the highest number of tips in Fiscal Year 2017 were Canada, the United Kingdom, and Australia. Since the inception of the program, the SEC has received whistleblower tips from 114 countries.

== Violations ==
- Insider trading
- Accounting fraud
- Financial reporting violations
- Bribery or corruption
- Ponzi schemes
- Misuse of client funds
- Manipulation of securities prices
- Violations of the Foreign Corrupt Practices Act
- Release agreements that interfere with the ability of the SEC to investigate

=== Notable awards ===
Since 2011, whistleblowers' tips have enabled the SEC to recover more than $1.4 billion in financial penalties from wrongdoers. Former SEC Chair Mary Jo White called the new SEC whistleblower program a "game changer," in an April 2015 speech. "The program is a success – and we will work hard at the SEC to build on that success," she said.

Given that SEC investigations can take two to four years to complete, there were no awards made in the Program's first year of operation.

The first SEC whistleblower award was made on August 21, 2012 to a whistleblower who provided documents and information relating to an ongoing multimillion-dollar fraud. The whistleblower received $50,000, which represented 30 percent of the amount the Commission had collected at the end of the fiscal year.

Four awards were made in Fiscal Year 2013, which totaled over $14 million.

In Fiscal Year 2014, the Commission issued awards to 9 whistleblowers, with actual payouts during the year approaching $2 million. In 2014, the SEC announced an award of more than $300,000–the first to an employee in an audit or compliance function–who filed a submission with the SEC after reporting internally and the company failed to take action.

In Fiscal Year 2015, the Commission paid more than $37 million out of the Investor Protection Fund to eight whistleblowers. Among the awards, someone outside of the United States received more than $30 million, one of the largest award in the Program's history. Other precedent setting cases include the first award to a former company officer and the first award to a whistleblower who suffered retaliation for reporting possible securities violations to the SEC.

Fiscal Year 2016 proved to be record-breaking, with the SEC awarding $57 million in whistleblower awards, more than the total paid in all years combined. Among the significant awards, a former company employee received an award of more than $17 million for a detailed tip that substantially advanced the agency's investigation and another insider received $22 million for extensive assistance that helped the agency halt a well-hidden fraud.

While the financial incentive to report to the SEC is critical, approximately 84% of the award recipients to date raised concerns internally to their supervisors, compliance personnel or through internal reporting mechanisms before reporting violations to the SEC. When internal compliance systems fail, the monetary awards the program offers appropriately incentivize whistleblowers to continue their efforts to expose the wrongdoing by reporting directly to the SEC.

In Fiscal Year 2021, the SEC awarded its second-highest award to date, more than $50 million, to two whistleblowers. According to Jane Norberg, chief of the SEC Office of the Whistleblower, the joint whistleblowers played a critical role in alerting SEC staff to violations involving "highly complex transactions," and helping the agency recover tens of millions of dollars for investors. In a press release dated April 15, 2021, Norberg stated that the office had awarded more than $250 million to whistleblowers in Fiscal Year 2021 alone, with more than five months left to go in the government's fiscal year.

In Fiscal Year 2022, the SEC awarded whistleblowers approximately $229 million in 103 awards. They also received the largest number of whistleblower tips ever in a single fiscal year - 12,300 tips - from a variety of alleged misconduct categories that included Manipulation (21%), Offering Fraud (17%), Initial Coin Offerings and Cryptocurrencies (14%), and Corporate Disclosures and Financials (13%).

The former Chief of the Office of the Whistleblower, Sean McKessy, once said he understood the public's skepticism about the program. "I view it as already having been a very significant success, but I understand that people want to see the deliverable. And the deliverable, in our view, is paying people for good information," he said. He added that he welcomes the opportunity to make payouts: "The more, the better, obviously. The higher the amounts, the better," he said. "We are likely to see more awards at a faster pace now that the program has been up and running and the tips we have gotten are leading to successful cases," McKessy told the Wall Street Journal in June 2013. Sean McKessy left the agency in July 2016 after serving for five years and later joined a whistleblower law firm. He followed in the footsteps of Jordan A. Thomas, a former Assistant Director in the Enforcement Division, who had a leadership role in the development of the SEC Whistleblower Program. Thomas created a law firm specifically with the purpose of representing corporate whistleblowers in 2011. The SEC named Jane A. Norberg, the longtime Deputy Chief, Chief of the Office of the Whistleblower on September 28, 2016. On April 8, 2021, the SEC announced that Jane Norberg would be stepping down from her position sometime in April.

=== Appellate Court Challenges ===
On December 12, 2015 an anonymous party filed the first petition for a writ of mandamus in John Doe v. SEC. The motion is a rarely used motion that asks for intervention of the United States Court of Appeals for the District of Columbia Circuit into the SEC's alleged negligent dealing with the individual's claim. The motion claims that the SEC whistleblowers office had been negligent in a case originally posted as available for reward in 2012. The motion goes on to state that the anonymous petitioner applied for the reward in October 2012 and three years later there had been no preliminary determination made in the case USCA #15-1444. The petition went into detailed facts about the backlog of the program, and was highly redacted. It was later rendered as moot when the SEC issued an award to the anonymous party.

On December 5, 2017 the SEC program was again challenged by an anonymous party in John Doe V SEC (case number 16-1414) in the United States Court of Appeals for the District of Columbia Circuit.

== Use of the Investor Protection Fund ==
=== Establishment of the fund ===
The Investor Protection Fund was established in the fourth quarter of fiscal year 2010 to be available to the U.S. Securities and Exchange Commission, without further appropriation or fiscal year limitation for paying awards to whistleblowers and funding the work activities of Office of Inspector General’s employee suggestion program.

The SEC is required to annually request and obtain apportionments from the Office of Management and Budget to use these funds. OFM has developed policies and procedures for Investor Protection Fund that include a description of the whistleblower awards process, financial reporting requirements, budget request procedures, and procedures for replenishing the Investor Protection Fund.

The Investor Protection Fund was established in August 2010 with approximately $452 million of non-exchange revenue that was transferred to the fund from the U.S. Securities and Exchange Commission's disgorgement and penalties deposit fund. At the end of fiscal year 2016, the fund had $368 million in it.

If the Investor Protection Fund balance drops below $300 million, Enforcement will replenish it by identifying qualifying receipts for deposit.

The fund earns interest through short-term investments with the Bureau of Public Debt.

== Whistleblower process ==
=== Phase 1 – Intake/triage ===
During Phase 1 of intake and triage, whistleblowers submit a complaint to the SEC. Designated Division of Enforcement staff review the complaint to determine whether it should be assigned for further investigation or based on their initial review no further action (NFA) is warranted. Whistleblowers can submit a complaint using SEC form TCR to the SEC.

Online submissions are automatically uploaded into the SEC's Tips, Complaints, and Referrals system. Complaints received by mail and fax are manually entered into the TCR system by the Tips, Complaints, and Referrals intake group. The Office of Market Intelligence (OMI), located within Enforcement, reviews all Tips, Complaints, and Referrals and whistleblower complaints Enforcement receives.

OMI triages all tips, complaints, and referrals received by Enforcement. When OMI determines a complaint warrants further investigation, the complaint is assigned to one of the SEC's 11 regional offices, an Enforcement specialized unit, or an Enforcement associate director group located in the SEC's Headquarters. When it is determined that a complaint does not warrant further investigation or the complaint does not fall into Enforcement's priorities, OMI will designate the complaint as No Further Action (NFA). NFAs get a second review before a final decision is made to close the complaint. In some cases NFAs may be referred to an external government agency or other agency for action. On occasion the Office of the Whistleblower Chief will determine that a whistleblower's tip, complaint, or referral is sufficiently specific, timely, and credible which results in it being expedited through the triage process and assigned to investigative staff by OMI.

=== Phase 2 – Tracking ===
During Phase 2, Office of the Whistleblower personnel monitor whistleblower submissions that are assigned to investigative staff. The Office of the Whistleblower also documents the whistleblower's cooperation and the content and helpfulness of whistleblower information, answers questions, and aids Enforcement staff by providing subject matter expertise regarding the whistleblower program.

Furthermore, the Office of the Whistleblower documents information needed to process whistleblower awards. The office conducts quarterly conference calls with investigative staff to reconcile items that are tracked, with work that is assigned and resourced, and to discuss the quality of each whistleblower complaint.

A whistleblower complaint results in a successful action against a defendant if the monetary sanctions:

- Exceed $1 million. The whistleblower may then be eligible for a monetary award if all statutory criteria are met.
- The whistleblower is not immediately eligible for a monetary award if the monetary sanctions do not exceed $1 million. However, if the case is aggregated with related SEC actions that arise out of a common body of operative facts and the total monetary sanctions in the related SEC actions collectively exceed $1 million, then the whistleblower may be eligible for an award.

=== Phase 3 – Claim for an award ===
During Phase 3, a whistleblower can claim an award if information he or she provided to the Office of the Whistleblower leads to, or significantly contributes to, a successful U.S. Securities and Exchange Commission action. This action could result in the whistleblower receiving a monetary award if the sanctions ordered are over $1 million. The Office of the Whistleblower posts a Notice of Covered Action on its website for cases that result in monetary sanctions over $1 million. Whistleblowers have 90 days to submit a claim for an award using the Form WB-APP (application). The Office of the Whistleblower's website provides a notice date and a claim due date for each covered whistleblower action.

Whistleblowers receive their awards from the Securities and Exchange Commission Investor Protection Fund, established pursuant to Section 922 of the Dodd-Frank Act.

When the Office of the Whistleblower or Enforcement staff knows that a whistleblower has provided a tip that led or significantly contributed to a successful action, they should contact the whistleblower or the attorney for the whistleblower and inform him or her that a Notice of Covered Action has been posted on its website. The Office of the Whistleblower should advise the whistleblower on the process and timeline to apply for the award.

Office of the Whistleblower staff analyze the claims for awards to assess whether the whistleblower satisfied the eligibility and definitional requirements for an award. When a whistleblower is determined to have satisfied these criteria, the Office of the Whistleblower then uses four positive and three negative factors to derive a recommended award range between 10 and 30 percent of the dollar amount that was collected in the action.

The Office of the Whistleblower process for its analyses includes reviewing and comparing the facts of a claim to the whistleblower statute and regulations, reviewing relevant databases for information regarding the case and subsequent enforcement action, interviewing Enforcement staff regarding the case and the whistleblower's actions, interviewing the whistleblower and/or their counsel, and conducting due diligence and legal research to ensure proper consideration is given to each award claim.

In exercising its discretion to determine the award for SEC whistleblowers, the Commission will consider a variety of factors. Certain criteria may increase an award, such as the significance of the information provided by the whistleblower, the assistance provided by the whistleblower, the law enforcement interest in making an award and the participation of the whistleblower in internal reporting systems. Other factors may decrease an award, such as the culpability of the whistleblower, unreasonable reporting delay and interference with internal compliance and reporting systems.

When making an award recommendation, the Office of the Whistleblower submits a recommendation package to Enforcement's claims review staff. A preliminary determination is prepared and forwarded to the whistleblower. A whistleblower has 30 days to request a copy of the record the claims review staff based its decision on and/or to request a meeting with Office of the Whistleblower staff.

Should a whistleblower's claim be denied in the preliminary determination phase and the whistleblower fails to submit a timely response, the preliminary determination becomes the SEC's final order. If the whistleblower submits a timely response to appeal the preliminary determination decision, Office of the Whistleblower staff will assess the appeal and make a recommendation to the claims review staff. The Office of the Whistleblower then meets again with the claims review staff and the claims review staff makes a proposed final determination. The Office of the Whistleblower then notifies the Commission of the proposed final determination. The Commission has 30 days to review this determination. Any Commissioner can request within 30 days of receiving the proposed final determination notification, that the proposed final determination be reviewed by the Commission. If no Commissioner objects during the 30-day window, the proposed final determination becomes the final order and the Office of the Whistleblower then provides a copy of the final order to the whistleblower or the whistleblower's attorney.

After the final order has been issued, if a whistleblower has gotten an award that falls between 10 and 30 percent of the monetary sanctions collected in the action, the process is complete and the amount is not subject to appeal. However, if the whistleblower did not receive an award, or the award percentage is outside the statutory 10 to 30 percent that is collected from an action, the whistleblower may appeal the decision at the Federal Court of Appeals level. The Office of the General Counsel handles these appeals for the Commission.

Whistleblower awards are paid out of the Investor Protection Fund that was established in the Dodd-Frank Act. Payments from the IPF are made through the SEC's Office of Financial Management and are based on amounts that were collected from each individual case. A single payment can be made to the whistleblower if all monies are collected at the time the final order is issued, or the payment can occur on a rolling basis if the monies are collected over time, after the final order is issued.

To file a claim for a whistleblower award, one must file Form WB-APP, Application for Award for Original Information Provided Pursuant to Section 21F of the Securities Exchange Act of 1934.

=== Updating whistleblowers about the status of their applications ===
Below are the ways SEC Office of the Whistleblower communicates with whistleblowers after they submit an award application to the SEC:

- An acknowledgement or deficiency letter is sent to all applicants indicating whether the whistleblower's application is procedurally correct.
- An SEC Office of the Whistleblower attorney, who conducts a full review of a covered action, generally communicates with whistleblowers who have submitted award applications under a covered action.
- A written notification of the claims review staff's preliminary determination and a whistleblower's rights in the awards claims process are sent to the applicant.
- There's an opportunity for the whistleblower to request the record that was used by the claims review staff in making the preliminary determination.
- There's an opportunity for the whistleblower to request a meeting with Office of the Whistleblower to discuss the preliminary determination.
- If a claim is appealed to the claims review staff, (1) a written acknowledgment of receipt of appeal and (2) the results of the appeal (i.e., proposed final determination), will be sent to the whistleblower.
- If the preliminary determination is not appealed to the claims review staff and no award is made, OWB sends a letter enclosing the final order of the Commission to the whistleblower.
- Written notification of a proposed final determination being issued (whether pursuant to an appeal to the claims review staff or by virtue of the preliminary determination becoming a proposed final determination under the statute in the case of an award being recommended).
- Notification of the Commission's final order.

== Office of the Inspector General Evaluation ==
In the Office of the Inspector General Evaluation of the SEC's Whistleblower Program, January 18, 2013, the program was outlined by the Inspector General, providing some insight into its inner workings. Section 922 of the Dodd-Frank Wall Street Reform and Consumer Protection Act (Dodd-Frank), amended the Securities Exchange Act of 1934 (Exchange Act) by adding Section 21F, "Securities Whistleblower Incentives and Protection." Section 21F directs the SEC to make monetary awards to eligible individuals who voluntarily provide original information that leads to successful SEC enforcement actions resulting in the imposition of monetary sanctions over $1 million, and certain related successful actions. The SEC can make awards ranging from 10 to 30 percent of the monetary sanctions collected, which are paid from the SEC's Investor Protection Fund. In addition, Section 924(d) of Dodd-Frank directed the SEC to establish a separate office within the Commission to administer the whistleblower program. In February 2011, the Commission established the Office of the Whistleblower to carry out this function.

On May 25, 2011, the SEC adopted final Regulation 21F to implement the provisions of Section 21F of the Exchange Act. Regulation 21F became effective on August 12, 2011. Among other things, Regulation 21F defines terms that are essential to the whistleblower's program operations, establishes procedures for submitting tips and applying for awards, including appeals of SEC determinations, and whether and to whom to make an award; describes the criteria the SEC will consider in making award decisions, and implements Dodd-Frank's prohibition against retaliation for whistleblowing.

== Freedom of Information Act exemption ==
There are nine exemptions to the Freedom of Information Act, which the SEC and other federal agencies can use to deny the release of certain information which the public may request. Exemption 3, 5 U.S.C. Section 552(b)(3)(B) or (b)(3) pertains to information that is prohibited from disclosure by another federal law.

== Forms ==
The following are some related SEC forms:

- "SEC form TCR" (pdf), to submit information to the SEC Fax (703) 813-9322
- "WB-APP SEC Whistleblower Award Application" (pdf), to collect a reward from the SEC Fax (703) 813-9322
