= 2013–14 Malmö Redhawks season =

Swedish ice hockey club season

2013–14 Malmö Redhawks
- 2013–14 HockeyAllsvenskan champions
- League: Regular: 1st 2014 Kvalserien: 4th HockeyAllsvenskan
- 2013–14 record: 30–12–10
- Home record: 17–5–4
- Road record: 13–7–6
- Goals for: 160
- Goals against: 113

Team information
- General manager: Patrik Sylvegård
- Coach: Mats Lusth
- Assistant coach: Björn Hellkvist
- Captain: Tomas Kollar
- Alternate captains: Björn Karlsson
- Arena: Malmö Arena
- Average attendance: 5,667

Team leaders
- Goals: Daniel Viksten (23)
- Assists: Joey Tenute (34)
- Points: Joey Tenute (50)
- Penalty minutes: Teemu Kesä (112)
- Wins: Pontus Sjögren (22)
- Goals against average: Pontus Sjögren (1.89)

The 2013–14 season was Malmö Redhawks's seventh consecutive season in the HockeyAllsvenskan, the second-highest league in the Swedish ice hockey system. The regular season began on 12 September 2013 away against IF Björklöven, and finished on 4 March 2014 home against Timrå IK. The team finished in first place in the regular season and thus qualified for play in the 2014 Kvalserien. The Redhawks finished in fourth place in Kvalserien, this means that the club stayed in HockeyAllsvenskan for the 2014–15 season.

== Standings ==
=== 2013–14 HockeyAllsvenskan season ===
Pos	Team	Pld	W	OTW	OTL	L	GF	GA	GD	Pts	
1	Malmö Redhawks	52	30	5	5	12	160	113	+47	105	Advance to SHL qualifiers
2	VIK Västerås	52	26	9	4	13	134	104	+30	100	Advance to SHL qualifiers
3	Djurgårdens IF	52	23	8	11	10	152	111	+41	96	Advance to SHL qualifiers
4	BIK Karlskoga	52	25	5	9	13	158	120	+38	94	Advance to playoffs
5	Karlskrona HK	52	25	3	4	20	154	119	+35	85	Advance to playoffs

=== 2014 Kvalserien ===
2014 Kvalserien	GP	W	T	L	OTW	OTL	GF	GA	+/–	Pts
Örebro HK^{k}	10	6	2	2	1	1	32	21	+11	21
Djurgårdens IF^{k}	10	5	1	4	1	0	31	26	+5	17
Rögle BK^{e}	10	4	3	3	2	1	32	29	+3	17
Malmö Redhawks^{e}	10	4	2	4	1	1	25	27	–2	15
AIK^{e}	10	3	2	5	0	2	21	23	–2	11
VIK Västerås HK^{e}	10	2	2	6	1	1	19	34	–15	9

k – qualified for 2014–15 SHL season; e – qualified for 2014–15 HockeyAllsvenskan season

== Schedule and results ==
=== Preseason ===
2013 preseason game log: 3–3–1 (home: 1–1–0; road: 2–2–1)
#	Date	Home	Score	Visitor	OT	Decision	Attendance	Record	Recap
1	15 August	IK Pantern	2–3	Malmö Redhawks	SO	Brage	560	0–0–1
2	17 August	Kallinge-Ronneby IF	3–5	Malmö Redhawks		Brage	660	1–0–1
3	18 August	Malmö Redhawks	3–1	Karlskrona HK		Brage	920	2–0–1
4	21 August	IF Troja/Ljungby	1–2	Malmö Redhawks		Sjögren	515	3–0–1
5	31 August	Kölner Haie	5–2	Malmö Redhawks		Sjögren	Unknown	3–1–1
6	1 September	Krefeld Pinguine	3–1	Malmö Redhawks		Brage	Unknown	3–2–1
7	10 September	Malmö Redhawks	1–6	Växjö Lakers HC		Brage	Unknown	3–3–1

=== Regular season ===
2013-14 Game Log: 30–12–10, 105 Points (home: 17–5–4; road: 13–7–6)

September: 4–2–0, 12 Points (home: 3–0–0; road: 1–2–0)
#	Date	Home	Score	Visitor	OT	Decision	Attendance	Record	Pts	Recap
1	12 September	IF Björklöven	2–3	Malmö Redhawks		Sjögren	4,566	1–0–0	3
2	14 September	Malmö Redhawks	4–0	IF Troja/Ljungby		Sjögren	4,689	2–0–0	6
3	18 September	Asplöven HC	5–3	Malmö Redhawks		Brage	1,174	2–1–0	6
4	21 September	Malmö Redhawks	4–3	Rögle BK		Sjögren	9,221	3–1–0	9
5	23 September	Karlskrona HK	5–1	Malmö Redhawks		Sjögren	3,282	3–2–0	9
6	30 September	Malmö Redhawks	5–0	Södertälje SK		Sjögren	4,201	4–2–0	12

October: 4–2–3, 16 Points (home: 2–1–2; road: 2–1–1)
#	Date	Home	Score	Visitor	OT	Decision	Attendance	Record	Pts	Recap
7	2 October	IK Oskarshamn	3–2	Malmö Redhawks		Sjögren	2,105	4–3–0	12
8	6 October	Malmö Redhawks	4–2	VIK Västerås HK		Sjögren	4,214	5–3–0	15
9	8 October	Almtuna IS	0–3	Malmö Redhawks		Sjögren	1,071	6–3–0	18
10	12 October	Malmö Redhawks	3–2	BIK Karlskoga	SO	Sjögren	4,855	6–3–1	20
11	16 October	Malmö Redhawks	4–2	Mora IK		Sjögren	4,420	7–3–1	23
12	19 October	Timrå IK	2–3	Malmö Redhawks		Brage	2,798	8–3–1	26
13	24 October	Malmö Redhawks	1–2	IF Björklöven		Brage	4,475	8–4–1	26
14	27 October	Djurgårdens IF	4–3	Malmö Redhawks	OT	Sjögren	8,012	8–4–2	27
15	30 October	Malmö Redhawks	2–3	Asplöven HC	SO	Brage	4,513	8–4–3	28

November: 5–3–1, 16 Points (home: 3–2–0; road: 2–1–1)
#	Date	Home	Score	Visitor	OT	Decision	Attendance	Record	Pts	Recap
16	2 November	Rögle BK	2–0	Malmö Redhawks		Brage	4,711	8–5–3	28
17	4 November	Malmö Redhawks	3–4	Djurgårdens IF		Sjögren	8,170	8–6–3	28
18	11 November	Malmö Redhawks	5–0	Karlskrona HK		Sjögren	5,274	9–6–3	31
19	14 November	IF Troja/Ljungby	1–4	Malmö Redhawks		Sjögren	1,559	10–6–3	34
20	16 November	Malmö Redhawks	6–3	Södertälje SK		Sjögren	5,209	11–6–3	37
21	22 November	VIK Västerås HK	5–4	Malmö Redhawks	SO	Sjögren	3,423	11–6–4	38
22	25 November	Malmö Redhawks	2–0	IK Oskarshamn		Sjögren	4,376	12–6–4	41
23	27 November	Malmö Redhawks	2–5	Almtuna IS		Sjögren	4,328	12–7–4	41
24	29 November	BIK Karlskoga	3–5	Malmö Redhawks		Brage	3,114	13–7–4	44

December: 3–2–1, 11 Points (home: 2–1–1; road: 1–1–0)
#	Date	Home	Score	Visitor	OT	Decision	Attendance	Record	Pts	Recap
25	1 December	Mora IK	3–0	Malmö Redhawks		Brage	2,211	13–8–4	44
26	5 December	Malmö Redhawks	0–1	Timrå IK		Rahm	4,497	13–9–4	44
27	10 December	Malmö Redhawks	4–2	Djurgårdens IF		Rahm	5,361	14–9–4	47
28	13 December	Malmö Redhawks	3–2	Asplöven HC		Rahm	4,764	15–9–4	50
29	16 December	Malmö Redhawks	3–2	IF Troja/Ljungby	SO	Rahm	4,547	15–9–5	52
30	28 December	Karlskrona HK	3–5	Malmö Redhawks		Rahm	3,400	16–9–5	55

January: 5–3–2, 18 Points (home: 3–1–0; road: 2–2–2)
#	Date	Home	Score	Visitor	OT	Decision	Attendance	Record	Pts	Recap
31	6 January	Södertälje SK	1–2	Malmö Redhawks	SO	Rahm	3,704	16–9–6	57
32	8 January	IK Oskarshamn	6–2	Malmö Redhawks		Rahm	2,018	16–10–6	57
33	10 January	Malmö Redhawks	2–3	VIK Västerås HK		Rahm	5,752	16–11–6	57
34	13 January	Malmö Redhawks	4–1	Rögle BK		Rahm	8,677	17–11–6	60
35	16 January	Almtuna IS	2–4	Malmö Redhawks		Sjögren	1,338	18–11–6	63
36	18 January	BIK Karlskoga	4–3	Malmö Redhawks	SO	Rahm	5,029	18–11–7	64
37	20 January	Timrå IK	2–5	Malmö Redhawks		Rahm	3,148	19–11–7	67
38	22 January	Malmö Redhawks	2–0	Mora IK		Sjögren	4,751	20–11–7	70
39	26 January	Malmö Redhawks	3–1	IF Björklöven		Sjögren	12,800	21–11–7	73
40	29 January	Djurgårdens IF	5–2	Malmö Redhawks		Sjögren	5,227	21–12–7	73

February: 8–0–3, 29 Points (home: 3–0–1; road: 5–0–2)
#	Date	Home	Score	Visitor	OT	Decision	Attendance	Record	Pts	Recap
41	1 February	Asplöven HC	1–4	Malmö Redhawks		Sjögren	1,146	22–12–7	76
42	3 February	IF Björklöven	0–2	Malmö Redhawks		Sjögren	3,308	23–12–7	79
43	11 February	Rögle BK	1–5	Malmö Redhawks		Sjögren	4,585	24–12–7	82
44	13 February	Malmö Redhawks	2–1	Karlskrona HK	OT	Sjögren	7,048	24–12–8	84
45	15 February	IF Troja/Ljungby	0–4	Malmö Redhawks		Rahm	1,835	25–12–8	87
46	17 February	Södertälje SK	2–3	Malmö Redhawks		Rahm	2,554	26–12–8	90
47	20 February	Malmö Redhawks	3–1	IK Oskarshamn		Sjögren	5,656	27–12–8	93
48	22 February	VIK Västerås HK	2–3	Malmö Redhawks	SO	Rahm	3,913	27–12–9	95
49	24 February	Malmö Redhawks	4–0	Almtuna IS		Sjögren	4,525	28–12–9	98
50	26 February	Malmö Redhawks	2–1	BIK Karlskoga		Sjögren	5,684	29–12–9	101
51	28 February	Mora IK	7–6	Malmö Redhawks	SO	Rahm	3,576	29–12–10	102

March: 1–0–0, 3 Points (home: 1–0–0; road: 0–0–0)
#	Date	Home	Score	Visitor	OT	Decision	Attendance	Record	Pts	Recap
52	4 March	Malmö Redhawks	2–1	Timrå IK		Rahm	5,338	30–12–10	105

Legend: Win (3 points) Overtime/Shootout win (2 points) Loss (0 points) Overtime/Shootout loss (1 point)

=== 2014 Kvalserien ===
Malmö Redhawks qualified to the 2014 Kvalserien by finishing in first place in the regular season. The team last participated in the Kvalserien at the end of the 2007–08 season. The Redhawks will play the next season in HockeyAllsvenskan since the finished in fourth place in Kvalserien. The team won both matches against SHL team Örebro HK and fellow HockeyAllsvenskan team VIK Västerås HK, but lost both matches against HockeyAllsvenskan teams Rögle BK and Djurgårdens IF. They also won one of their matches against SHL team AIK.

2014 Kvalserien Game Log: 4–4–2, 15 Points (home: 1–2–2; road: 3–2–0)
#	Date	Home	Score	Visitor	OT	Decision	Attendance	Record	Pts	Recap
1	17 March	Malmö Redhawks	3–2	VIK Västerås HK	SO	Rahm	7,014	0–0–1	2
2	19 March	Djurgårdens IF	3–0	Malmö Redhawks		Rahm	8,003	0–1–1	2
3	21 March	Malmö Redhawks	3–2	Örebro HK		Sjögren	8,286	1–1–1	5
4	23 March	Rögle BK	5–2	Malmö Redhawks		Sjögren	5,100	1–2–1	5
5	25 March	VIK Västerås HK	1–3	Malmö Redhawks		Rahm	4,146	2–2–1	8
6	27 March	Malmö Redhawks	2–4	AIK		Rahm	9,055	2–3–1	8
7	29 March	AIK	1–2	Malmö Redhawks		Sjögren	6,443	3–3–1	11
8	1 April	Malmö Redhawks	3–5	Rögle BK		Sjögren	12,800	3–4–1	11
9	4 April	Malmö Redhawks	3–4	Djurgårdens IF	OT	Sjögren	9,221	3–4–2	12
10	7 April	Örebro HK	0–4	Malmö Redhawks		Sjögren	5,011	4–4–2	15

Legend: Win (3 points) Overtime/Shootout win (2 points) Loss (0 points) Overtime/Shootout loss (1 point)

== Player stats ==
Updated as of end of season

=== Skaters ===
Note: GP = Games played; G = Goals; A = Assists; Pts = Points; +/- = Plus–minus; PIM = Penalty minutes

Regular season

Player	GP	G	A	Pts	+/-	PIM
Joey Tenute	49	16	34	50	14	36
Daniel Viksten	45	23	14	37	–1	8
Björn Svensson	52	18	18	36	1	22
Jens Olsson	51	9	26	35	36	28
Henrik Hetta	52	16	15	31	21	12
Frederik Storm	52	13	17	30	9	51
Robin Álvarez	46	17	12	29	13	38
Mattias Persson	46	8	15	23	4	24
Björn Karlsson	38	4	19	23	–5	34
Nicklas Jadeland	52	10	9	19	7	50
Ludvig Rensfeldt	47	7	7	14	7	14
Tobias Ericsson	44	5	9	14	–1	16
Rasmus Andersson	43	3	10	13	4	26
Calle Andersson	43	2	10	12	2	10
Magnus Häggström	52	2	8	10	1	62
Tomas Kollar	52	2	7	9	–1	24
Johan Björk	50	0	9	9	23	28
Brian Ihnacak^{†}	7	3	2	5	3	4
Anton Blomqvist	51	1	3	4	–6	109
Teemu Kesä	34	0	2	2	8	112
Marcus Olsson^{†}	1	1	0	1	1	2
Sebastian Meijer	23	0	1	1	2	2
Emil Djuse^{‡}	3	0	0	0	0	2
Olle Wallberg^{(G)‡}	5	0	0	0	—	0
Filip Windlert^{‡}	5	0	0	0	0	2
Mads Larsen^{‡}	8	0	0	0	0	0
Amil Krupic^{‡}	10	0	0	0	0	2
Kim Rosdahl^{‡}	12	0	0	0	–1	0
Kalle Hult^{‡}	13	0	0	0	2	2
Patrik Blomberg	13	0	0	0	–2	4
Axel Brage^{(G)‡}	22	0	0	0	—	0
Robin Rahm^{(G)†}	25	0	0	0	—	2
David Liffiton^{†}	28	0	0	0	–3	108
Pontus Sjögren^{(G)}	52	0	0	0	—	12
Team Totals		160	247	407	-457	864

2014 Kvalserien

Player	GP	G	A	Pts	+/-	PIM
Frederik Storm	10	4	3	7	2	0
Daniel Viksten	10	3	3	6	1	0
Robin Álvarez	9	5	0	5	–1	2
Tobias Ericsson	10	2	3	5	–4	6
Joey Tenute	10	2	3	5	0	10
Jens Olsson	10	2	2	4	1	2
Henrik Hetta	10	0	4	4	2	2
Björn Svensson	8	0	3	3	1	2
Marcus Olsson	10	0	3	3	–5	2
Magnus Häggström	10	0	3	3	–1	6
Johan Björk	9	2	0	2	2	2
Brian Ihnacak	10	1	1	2	0	4
Mattias Persson	10	0	2	2	–1	2
Calle Andersson	6	1	0	1	0	2
Ludvig Rensfeldt	10	1	0	1	–1	2
Nicklas Jadeland	10	1	0	1	–1	4
David Liffiton	10	1	0	1	0	10
Teemu Kesä	5	0	1	1	0	0
Sebastian Meijer	3	0	0	0	0	0
Robin Rahm^{(G)}	10	0	0	0	—	0
Rasmus Andersson	10	0	0	0	–2	0
Tomas Kollar	10	0	0	0	–2	0
Pontus Sjögren^{(G)}	10	0	0	0	—	2
Anton Blomqvist	10	0	0	0	–4	4
Team Totals		25	31	56	8	64

- ^{†}Denotes player spent time with another team before joining Malmö Redhawks. Stats reflect time with the Redhawks only.
- ^{‡}Denotes player was traded mid-season. Stats reflect time with the Redhawks only.
- ^{(G)}Denotes goaltender.
- Team PIM totals include bench infractions.

=== Goaltenders ===
Note: GPI = Games played in; MIN = Minutes played; GAA = Goals against average; W = Wins; L = Losses; SO = Shutouts; SA = Shots against; GA = Goals against; SV% = Save percentage

Regular season

Player	GPI	MIN	GAA	W	L	SO	SA	GA	SV%
Pontus Sjögren	30	1718	1.89	22	7	8	684	54	.921
Robin Rahm	16	936	2.05	11	4	1	367	32	.912
Axel Brage	9	497	2.41	2	6	0	196	20	.898
Combined		3151	2.14	35	17	9	1247	106	.909

2014 Kvalserien

Player	GPI	MIN	GAA	W	L	SO	SA	GA	SV%
Pontus Sjögren	7	325	2.58	3	2	1	137	14	.898
Robin Rahm	6	276	2.82	2	3	0	120	13	.892
Combined		601	2.66	5	5	1	257	27	.895

== Final roster ==
No.	Nat	Player	Pos	S/G	Age	Acquired	Birthplace
10	(Sweden)	Robin Álvarez	LW	L	38	2007	Malmö, Sweden
57	(Sweden)	Calle Andersson	D	R	32	2012	Malmö, Sweden
75	(Sweden)	Rasmus Andersson	D	R	29	2012	Malmö, Sweden
95	(Denmark)	Mathias Bau Hansen	LW	L	33	2013	Glostrup, Denmark
14	(Sweden)	Patrik Blomberg	LW	L	32	2012	Stockholm, Sweden
4	(Sweden)	Anton Blomqvist	D	L	36	2013	Kristianstad, Sweden
5	(Sweden)	Johan Björk	D	L	41	2012	Malmö, Sweden
67	(Sweden)	Tobias Ericsson	W	L	39	2013	Stockholm, Sweden
20	(Sweden)	Henrik Hetta	LW	L	36	2012	Strömsund, Sweden
16	(Sweden)	Magnus Häggström	RW	R	39	2012	Örnsköldsvik, Sweden
64	(Canada)	Brian Ihnacak	C/RW	R	41	2014	Toronto, Ontario, Canada
61	(Sweden)	Nicklas Jadeland	LW	L	40	2012	Malmö, Sweden
3	(Sweden)	Björn Karlsson (A)	D	L	37	2013	Rävemåla, Sweden
55	(Finland)	Teemu Kesä	D	R	45	2013	Helsinki, Finland
29	(Sweden)	Tomas Kollar (C)	W	L	44	2011	Stockholm, Sweden
36	(Canada)	David Liffiton	D	L	41	2013	Windsor, Ontario, Canada
13	(Sweden)	Sebastian Meijer	C	L	41	2012	Ulricehamn, Sweden
28	(Sweden)	Jens Olsson	D	L	41	2012	Malmö, Sweden
24	(Sweden)	Marcus Olsson	C/LW	L	39	2014	Trelleborg, Sweden
90	(Sweden)	Mattias Persson	LW	L	41	2012	Bohus-Malmön, Sweden
30	(Sweden)	Robin Rahm	G	L	39	2014	Torsby, Sweden
79	(Sweden)	Ludvig Rensfeldt	W	L	34	2012	Gävle, Sweden
40	(Sweden)	Pontus Sjögren	G	L	41	2011	Stockholm, Sweden
9	(Denmark)	Frederik Storm	LW	L	37	2012	Gentofte, Denmark
91	(Sweden)	Björn Svensson	LW	L	40	2013	Ljungby, Sweden
11	(Canada)	Joey Tenute	C/LW	L	43	2013	Hamilton, Ontario, Canada
17	(Sweden)	Daniel Viksten	RW	R	36	2013	Mora, Sweden
