= Björn Karlsson =

Swedish ice hockey player

- Born: January 7, 1989 (age 37) Rävemåla, Sweden
- Height: 6 ft 2 in (188 cm)
- Weight: 196 lb (89 kg; 14 st 0 lb)
- Position: Defence
- Shot: Left
- Played for: Malmö Redhawks; Gislaveds SK; Växjö Lakers; IK Pantern; IK Oskarshamn; Tingsryds AIF
- NHL draft: Undrafted
- Playing career: 2008–2019

Björn Karlsson (born January 7, 1989) is a Swedish professional ice hockey defenceman.

== Career statistics ==
			Regular season					Playoffs
Season	Team	League	GP	G	A	Pts	PIM	GP	G	A	Pts	PIM
2004–05	Växjö Lakers HC J18	J18 Div.1	—	—	—	—	—	—	—	—	—	—
2005–06	Tingsryds AIF J18	J18 Elit	7	0	2	2	34	—	—	—	—	—
2005–06	Tingsryds AIF J20	J20 Elit	6	0	0	0	4	—	—	—	—	—
2006–07	Växjö Lakers HC J20	J20 Elit	25	1	4	5	—	—	—	—	—	—
2007–08	Rögle BK J20	J20 SuperElit	34	6	4	10	30	2	0	0	0	0
2008–09	Växjö Lakers HC J20	J20 Elit	8	4	3	7	8	—	—	—	—	—
2008–09	Växjö Lakers HC	HockeyAllsvenskan	21	0	0	0	8	10	0	4	4	2
2008–09	Gislaveds SK	Division 1	10	0	3	3	26	—	—	—	—	—
2009–10	Växjö Lakers HC	HockeyAllsvenskan	46	1	4	5	32	6	0	1	1	2
2010–11	Växjö Lakers HC J20	J20 Elit	2	1	0	1	4	—	—	—	—	—
2010–11	Växjö Lakers HC	HockeyAllsvenskan	47	0	8	8	42	10	0	0	0	10
2011–12	Växjö Lakers HC	Elitserien	53	1	10	11	30	—	—	—	—	—
2012–13	Växjö Lakers HC	Elitserien	42	1	2	3	12	—	—	—	—	—
2013–14	Malmö Redhawks	HockeyAllsvenskan	38	4	19	23	34	—	—	—	—	—
2014–15	Malmö Redhawks	HockeyAllsvenskan	—	—	—	—	—	—	—	—	—	—
2015–16	IK Pantern	HockeyAllsvenskan	15	2	4	6	14	—	—	—	—	—
2016–17	IK Oskarshamn	HockeyAllsvenskan	27	2	9	11	18	—	—	—	—	—
2017–18	IK Oskarshamn	HockeyAllsvenskan	30	2	1	3	16	6	0	4	4	2
2018–19	Tingsryds AIF	HockeyAllsvenskan	12	0	2	2	10	—	—	—	—	—
Elitserien totals			95	2	12	14	42	—	—	—	—	—
HockeyAllsvenskan totals			236	11	47	58	174	32	0	9	9	16
