= Arsi Piispanen =

Finnish ice hockey player

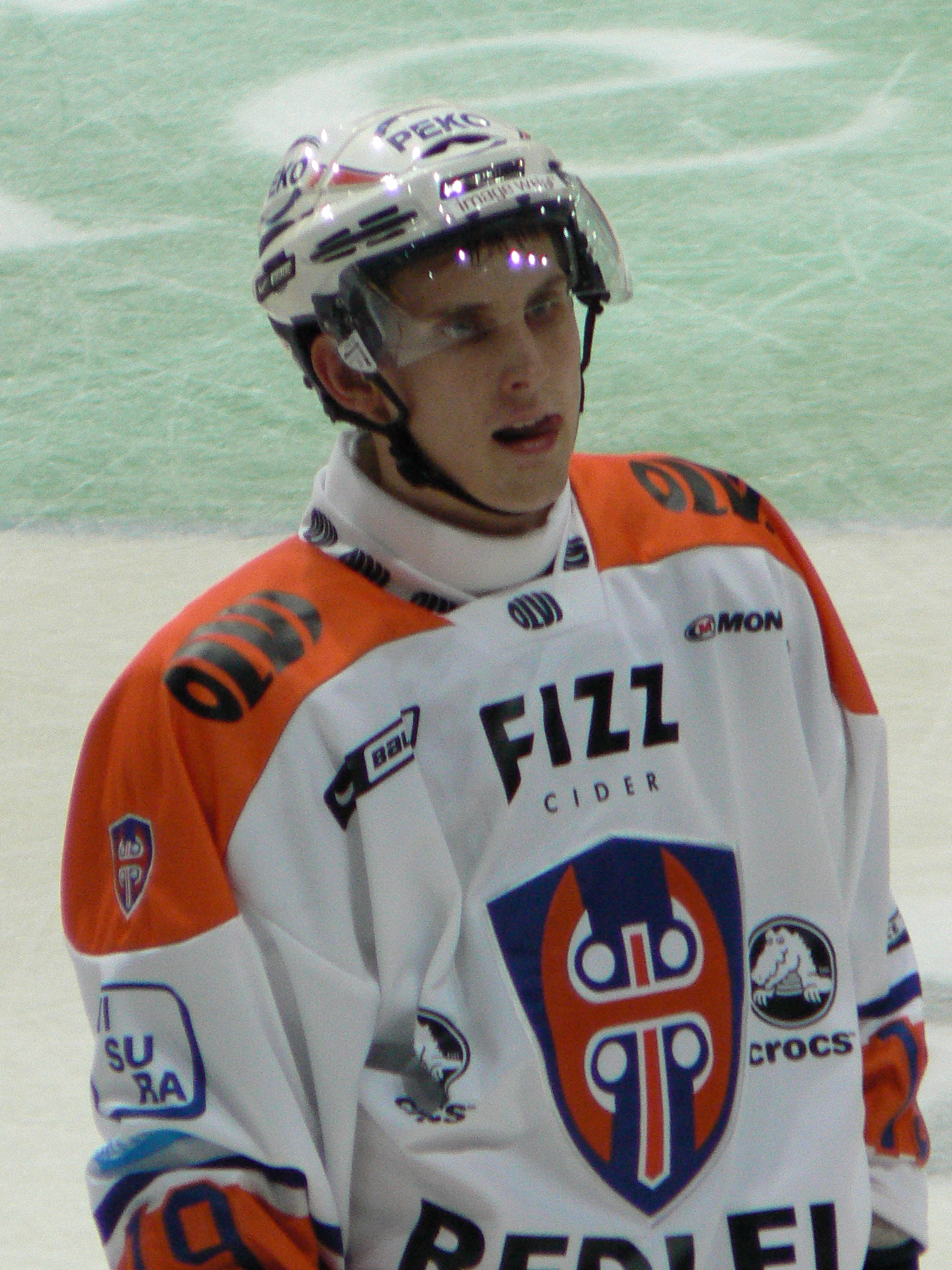
- Born: 25 July 1985 (age 41) Jyväskylä, Finland
- Height: 6 ft 4 in (193 cm)
- Weight: 192 lb (87 kg; 13 st 10 lb)
- Position: Forward
- Shot: Right
- SHL team Former teams: IK Oskarshamn; Jokerit; JYP Jyväskylä; Tappara; Lahti Pelicans; HPK
- NHL draft: 138th overall, 2003; Columbus Blue Jackets
- Playing career: 2003–2020

Arsi Piispanen (born 25 July 1985) is a Finnish former professional ice hockey forward who is currently the general manager for IK Oskarshamn in HockeyAllsvenskan. He was selected by the Columbus Blue Jackets in the fifth round, 138th overall, of the 2003 NHL entry draft.

Piispanen returned to JYP in the spring of 2004 and managed to become a regular in the national team's playing lineup the following season. Piispanen played for JYP for three seasons. In April 2007, he signed a three-year contract with Tappara. In the fall of 2008, he transferred to the Pelicans.

He previously played with HPK of the Finnish Liiga before joining Oskarshamn.

== Career statistics ==
=== Regular season and playoffs ===
			Regular season					Playoffs
Season	Team	League	GP	G	A	Pts	PIM	GP	G	A	Pts	PIM
2000–01	Jokerit	FIN U18	3	0	2	2	0	—	—	—	—	—
2001–02	Jokerit	FIN U18	16	7	19	26	8	8	4	3	7	12
2001–02	Jokerit	FIN U20	1	0	0	0	0	—	—	—	—	—
2002–03	Jokerit	FIN U18	10	12	6	18	2	6	2	3	5	2
2002–03	Jokerit	FIN U20	31	8	9	17	8	7	1	2	3	0
2003–04	Jokerit	FIN U20	36	5	20	25	12	10	3	3	6	2
2003–04	Jokerit	SM-l	5	0	0	0	0	4	0	0	0	0
2003–04	Suomi U20	Mestis	8	2	2	4	0	—	—	—	—	—
2004–05	JYP	FIN U20	1	0	0	0	0	—	—	—	—	—
2004–05	JYP	SM-l	52	2	10	12	12	3	0	1	1	0
2005–06	JYP	SM-l	52	9	8	17	14	3	1	1	2	2
2006–07	JYP	SM-l	36	2	4	6	16	—	—	—	—	—
2007–08	Tappara	SM-l	56	3	13	16	12	11	2	2	4	2
2008–09	Tappara	SM-l	18	0	2	2	0	—	—	—	—	—
2008–09	Pelicans	SM-l	38	2	9	11	18	9	2	5	7	0
2009–10	Pelicans	SM-l	49	4	10	14	10	—	—	—	—	—
2009–10	HeKi	Mestis	3	2	1	3	2	—	—	—	—	—
2010–11	HPK	SM-l	41	5	14	19	18	—	—	—	—	—
2011–12	HPK	SM-l	53	10	16	26	14	—	—	—	—	—
2012–13	HPK	SM-l	50	4	15	19	16	5	0	1	1	2
2013–14	IK Oskarshamn	Allsv	52	11	23	34	20	—	—	—	—	—
2014–15	IK Oskarshamn	Allsv	41	6	14	20	12	—	—	—	—	—
2015–16	IK Oskarshamn	Allsv	52	13	22	35	24	5	2	0	2	2
2016–17	IK Oskarshamn	Allsv	52	4	19	23	38	—	—	—	—	—
2017–18	IK Oskarshamn	Allsv	52	13	18	31	10	8	2	4	6	4
2018–19	IK Oskarshamn	Allsv	47	10	26	36	20	12	0	8	8	4
2019–20	IK Oskarshamn	SHL	52	2	15	17	10	—	—	—	—	—
SM-l totals			450	41	101	142	130	35	5	10	15	6
Allsv totals			296	57	122	179	124	25	4	12	16	10

=== International ===
Year	Team	Event	GP	G	A	Pts	PIM
2003	Finland	WJC18	6	4	1	5	4
2004	Finland	WJC	7	1	0	1	0
2005	Finland	WJC	6	0	0	0	0
Junior totals			19	5	1	6	4
