= Anton Blomqvist =

Swedish ice hockey player (born 1990)

- Born: March 7, 1990 (age 36) Kristianstad, Sweden
- Height: 6 ft 5 in (196 cm)
- Weight: 201 lb (91 kg; 14 st 5 lb)
- Position: Defence
- Shot: Left
- Played for: Malmö Redhawks; Springfield Falcons; IK Oskarshamn; IK Pantern
- NHL draft: 167th overall, 2009; Columbus Blue Jackets
- Playing career: 2008–2017

Anton Blomqvist (born March 7, 1990) is a Swedish former professional ice hockey defenceman who most notably played in the HockeyAllsvenskan (Allsv). He was most recently the head coach, of the SHL club HV71.

== Playing career ==
Before coming to North America, Blomqvist played over 100 games of professional hockey with the Swedish Malmö Redhawks in HockeyAllsvenskan and European Trophy. He was selected by the Columbus Blue Jackets in the 6th round (167th overall) of the 2009 NHL entry draft. During the 2010–11 season, he left the Redhawks and signed a three-year entry-level contract with the Blue Jackets on March 17, 2011.

In his two years in North America, he was assigned to the Blue Jackets American Hockey League affiliate, the Springfield Falcons and the Evansville IceMen of the ECHL. After making a negligible impact, Blomqvist returned on loan to Malmö for the final year of his contract with Columbus on June 18, 2013.

As an impending free agent with the Blue Jackets on May 22, 2014, Blomqvist opted to remain in the HockeyAllsvenskan signing with IK Oskarshamn.

== Career statistics ==
			Regular season					Playoffs
Season	Team	League	GP	G	A	Pts	PIM	GP	G	A	Pts	PIM
2006–07	Linköpings	J20	18	0	1	1	20	—	—	—	—	—
2007–08	Malmö Redhawks	J20	18	0	1	1	20	—	—	—	—	—
2008–09	Malmö Redhawks	J20	31	2	14	16	73	—	—	—	—	—
2008–09	Malmö Redhawks	Allsv	13	0	3	3	8	—	—	—	—	—
2009–10	Malmö Redhawks	Allsv	49	3	2	5	55	5	0	0	0	10
2009–10	Malmö Redhawks	J20	—	—	—	—	—	1	0	0	0	0
2010–11	Malmö Redhawks	Allsv	27	0	1	1	14	—	—	—	—	—
2010–11	Springfield Falcons	AHL	5	0	1	1	21	—	—	—	—	—
2011–12	Springfield Falcons	AHL	24	0	0	0	19	—	—	—	—	—
2012–13	Evansville IceMen	ECHL	36	1	2	3	46	—	—	—	—	—
2013–14	Malmö Redhawks	Allsv	51	1	3	4	109	10	0	0	0	4
2014–15	IK Oskarshamn	Allsv	45	1	7	8	69	—	—	—	—	—
2015–16	IK Pantern	Allsv	46	3	4	7	96	—	—	—	—	—
2016–17	IK Pantern	Allsv	3	0	0	0	4	—	—	—	—	—
Allsv totals			234	8	20	28	355	15	0	0	0	14
