= 2014 Kvalserien =

Swedish ice hockey tournament

The 2014 Kvalserien was the 40th and final Kvalserien, consisting of two Swedish Hockey League teams and four HockeyAllsvenskan teams. It began on 17 March 2014 and will end on 7 April 2014. The 2014 Kvalserien determined which two teams of the participating ones would play in the 2014–15 SHL season and which four teams would play in the 2014–15 HockeyAllsvenskan season. Örebro HK defended their SHL spot and Djurgårdens IF returned to the top-tier league after a two-year stint in HockeyAllsvenskan. AIK were relegated to HockeyAllsvenskan.

== Participating teams ==
Team	City	Arena	Capacity
AIK	Stockholm	Hovet	8,094
Djurgårdens IF	Stockholm	Hovet	8,094
Malmö Redhawks	Malmö	Malmö Arena	13,000
Rögle BK	Ängelholm	Lindab Arena	5,150
Västerås HK	Västerås	ABB Arena	5,800
Örebro HK	Örebro	Behrn Arena	5,200

From SHL (ranked 11–12)

- Örebro HK
- AIK

From HockeyAllsvenskan (ranked 1–3)

- Malmö Redhawks
- VIK Västerås HK
- Djurgårdens IF

From HockeyAllsvenskan playoff round

- Rögle BK

== Standings ==
2014 Kvalserien	GP	W	T	L	OTW	OTL	GF	GA	+/–	Pts
Örebro HK^{k}	10	6	2	2	1	1	32	21	+11	21
Djurgårdens IF^{k}	10	5	1	4	1	0	31	26	+5	17
Rögle BK^{e}	10	4	3	3	2	1	32	29	+3	17
Malmö Redhawks^{e}	10	4	2	4	1	1	25	27	–2	15
AIK^{e}	10	3	2	5	0	2	21	23	–2	11
VIK Västerås HK^{e}	10	2	2	6	1	1	19	34	–15	9

k – qualified for 2014–15 SHL season; e – qualified for 2014–15 HockeyAllsvenskan season

== Statistics ==
=== Scoring leaders ===
Updated as of the end of the 2014 Kvalserien.
GP = Games played; G = Goals; A = Assists; Pts = Points; +/– = Plus/minus; PIM = Penalty minutes

Player	Team	GP	G	A	Pts	+/–	PIM
(Sweden) Daniel Zaar	Rögle BK	10	2	12	14	+7	16
(Sweden) Marcus Sörensen	Djurgårdens IF	10	4	8	12	0	4
(Sweden) Marcus Högström	Djurgårdens IF	10	2	9	11	+5	4
(Sweden) Jens Jakobs	Djurgårdens IF	10	7	3	10	+4	0
(Canada) Jared Aulin	Örebro HK	7	2	7	9	+7	2
(Sweden) Daniel Sondell	Örebro HK	8	1	8	9	+9	4
(Sweden) Joakim Eriksson	Djurgårdens IF	10	1	8	9	0	14
(Sweden) Michael Holmqvist	Djurgårdens IF	10	6	2	8	+2	4
(Canada) Kelsey Tessier	Rögle BK	10	6	1	7	+3	8
(Finland) Jere Sallinen	Örebro HK	10	4	3	7	+5	8
(Denmark) Frederik Storm	Malmö Redhawks	10	4	3	7	+2	0

=== Leading goaltenders ===
These are the leaders in GAA among goaltenders who have played at least 40% of the team's minutes. Updated as of the end of the 2014 Kvalserien.

GP = Games played; TOI = Time on ice (minutes); GA = Goals against; SO = Shutouts; Sv% = Save percentage; GAA = Goals against average

Player	Team	GP	TOI	GA	SO	Sv%	GAA
(Sweden) Tim Sandberg	Örebro HK	7	423:23	13	1	.927	1.84
(Sweden) Daniel Larsson	AIK	10	601:55	21	0	.921	2.09
(Sweden) Pontus Sjögren	Malmö Redhawks	7	325:41	14	1	.898	2.58
(Sweden) Adam Reideborn	Djurgårdens IF	10	603:05	26	1	.910	2.59
(Sweden) Kevin Lindskoug	Rögle BK	10	606:47	27	0	.906	2.67
