= Eetu Qvist =

Finnish ice hockey centre

- Born: June 10, 1983 (age 41); Kuopio, Finland
- Height: 6 ft 1 in (185 cm)
- Weight: 187 lb (85 kg; 13 st 5 lb)
- Position: Centre
- Shot: Left
- Played for: SaiPa; KalPa
- Playing career: 2001–2015

Eetu Qvist (born June 10, 1983) is a Finnish former ice hockey centre.

Qvist played in the SM-liiga for SaiPa and KalPa between 2003 and 2007, playing a total of 210 games. He then spent the next seven seasons in Sweden, playing in the HockeyAllsvenskan for IK Oskarshamn, IF Björklöven, Bofors IK and Asplöven HC, as well as in Hockeyettan for IF Sundsvall Hockey.

On July 15, 2014, Qvist returned to Finland to sign for Iisalmen Peli-Karhut of the Suomi-sarja for one season before retiring.

== Career statistics ==
			Regular season					Playoffs
Season	Team	League	GP	G	A	Pts	PIM	GP	G	A	Pts	PIM
1998–99	KalPa U16	U16 SM-sarja	22	14	18	32	24	—	—	—	—	—
1999–00	KalPa U18	U18 SM-sarja	5	4	2	6	2	—	—	—	—	—
2000–01	KalPa U18	U18 SM-sarja	1	1	2	3	0	—	—	—	—	—
2000–01	KalPa U20	U20 SM-liiga	43	21	27	48	34	1	1	1	2	0
2000–01	KalPa	Suomi-sarja	—	—	—	—	—	8	2	1	3	0
2001–02	KalPa U20	U20 SM-liiga	26	14	26	40	32	—	—	—	—	—
2001–02	KalPa	Mestis	20	5	10	15	8	9	0	3	3	2
2002–03	HIFK U20	U20 SM-liiga	17	14	11	25	6	—	—	—	—	—
2003–04	SaiPa U20	U20 SM-liiga	7	2	6	8	2	—	—	—	—	—
2003–04	SaiPa	SM-liiga	51	3	10	13	18	—	—	—	—	—
2004–05	SaiPa	SM-liiga	56	8	11	19	22	—	—	—	—	—
2005–06	SaiPa	SM-liiga	15	2	1	3	8	—	—	—	—	—
2005–06	KalPa	SM-liiga	32	3	9	12	18	—	—	—	—	—
2006–07	KalPa	SM-liiga	56	1	7	8	50	—	—	—	—	—
2007–08	IK Oskarshamn	HockeyAllsvenskan	40	9	30	39	24	—	—	—	—	—
2008–09	IK Oskarshamn	HockeyAllsvenskan	40	10	31	41	26	—	—	—	—	—
2009–10	IF Björklöven	HockeyAllsvenskan	35	7	11	18	12	—	—	—	—	—
2010–11	Bofors IK	HockeyAllsvenskan	36	8	20	28	16	—	—	—	—	—
2011–12	Bofors IK	HockeyAllsvenskan	50	6	13	19	30	10	0	0	0	4
2012–13	IF Sundsvall Hockey	Hockeyettan	42	24	45	69	28	3	1	1	2	2
2013–14	Asplöven HC	HockeyAllsvenskan	49	3	15	18	16	—	—	—	—	—
2013–14	IF Sundsvall Hockey	Hockeyettan	—	—	—	—	—	2	1	0	1	0
2014–15	Iisalmen Peli-Karhut	Suomi-sarja	30	11	19	30	12	—	—	—	—	—
SM-liiga totals			210	17	38	55	116	—	—	—	—	—
HockeyAllsvenskan totals			250	43	120	163	124	10	0	0	0	4
