= Rasmus Andersson =

Swedish ice hockey player (born 1996)

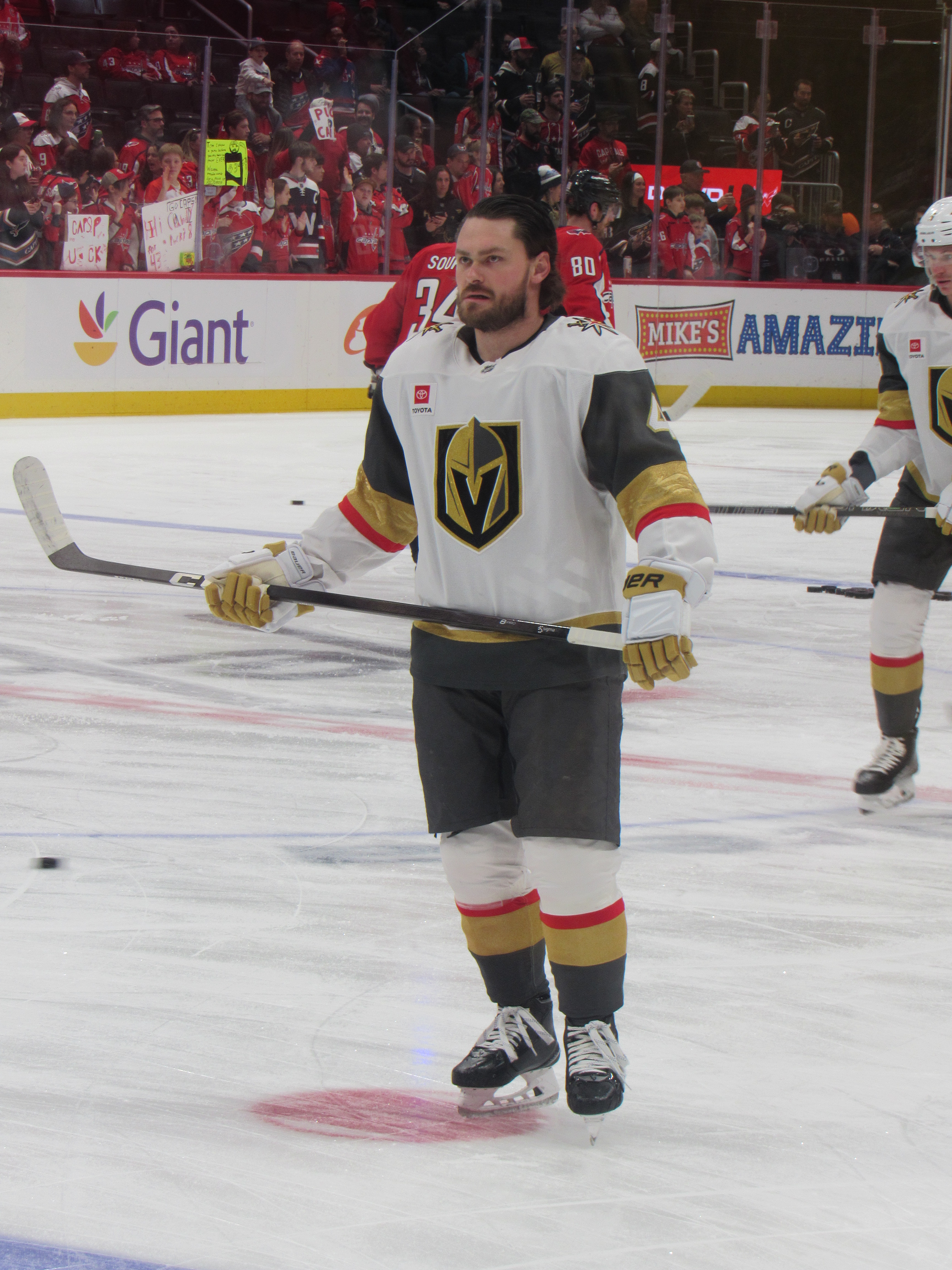
- Andersson with the Vegas Golden Knights in 2026
- Born: 27 October 1996 (age 29) Malmö, Sweden
- Height: 6 ft 1 in (185 cm)
- Weight: 202 lb (92 kg; 14 st 6 lb)
- Position: Defence
- Shoots: Right
- NHL team Former teams: Vegas Golden Knights; Calgary Flames
- National team: Sweden
- NHL draft: 53rd overall, 2015; Calgary Flames
- Playing career: 2012–present

Rasmus Andersson (born 27 October 1996) is a Swedish professional ice hockey player who is a defenceman for the Vegas Golden Knights of the National Hockey League (NHL). He was drafted 53rd overall by the Calgary Flames in the 2015 NHL entry draft.

Rasmus' older brother Calle and father Peter were both drafted by the New York Rangers, in 2012 and 1983, respectively.

== Early life ==
Andersson was born in Malmö, Sweden on 27 October 1996.

== Playing career ==
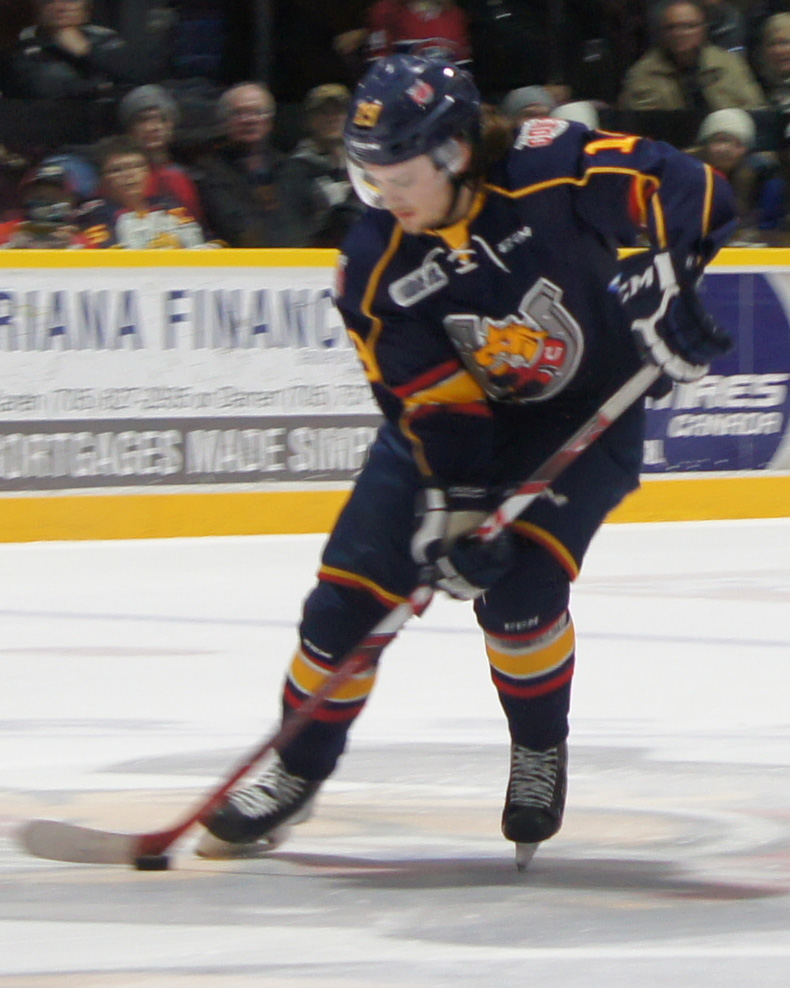
Andersson with the Barrie Colts.

Andersson made his professional debut in his native Sweden, with his local team Malmö Redhawks. He appeared in 38 games in the HockeyAllsvenskan for 11 points in the 2012–13 season. Andersson went on to record 13 points in 43 games in his second year stint in the Swedish second tier.

Andersson left Sweden and followed his family footsteps to North America by playing a major junior season with the Barrie Colts of the Ontario Hockey League (OHL) before he was selected by the Calgary Flames in the 2015 NHL entry draft. On 15 September 2015, Andersson was signed to a three-year, entry-level contract with the Flames.

Andersson began his professional career in North America during the 2016–17 season with the Stockton Heat of the American Hockey League (AHL), recording 22 points in 54 games. Andersson made his NHL debut on 8 April 2017, against the San Jose Sharks. The 3–1 loss was the Flames' final game of the regular season.

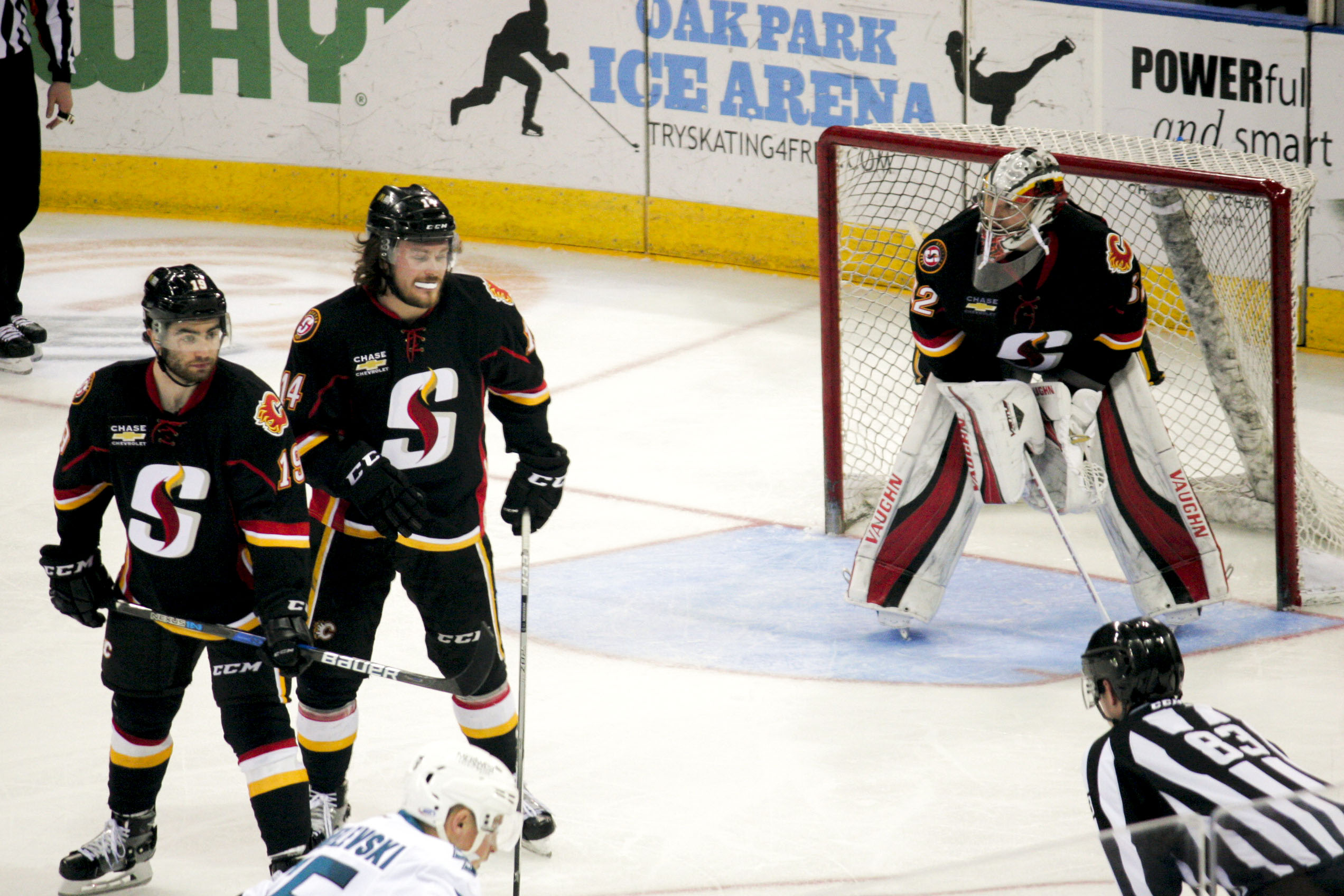
Andersson (centre) with the Stockton Heat in 2018

Andersson started the 2017–18 season with the Stockton Heat. He was called up to the NHL for the first time that season on 9 November 2017. His call up did not last long and he was sent back down to the AHL on 13 November, after playing one game. Andersson was selected as the sole representative of the Heat for the 2018 AHL All-Star Game. He was called up to the NHL for the second time that season on 19 March 2018.

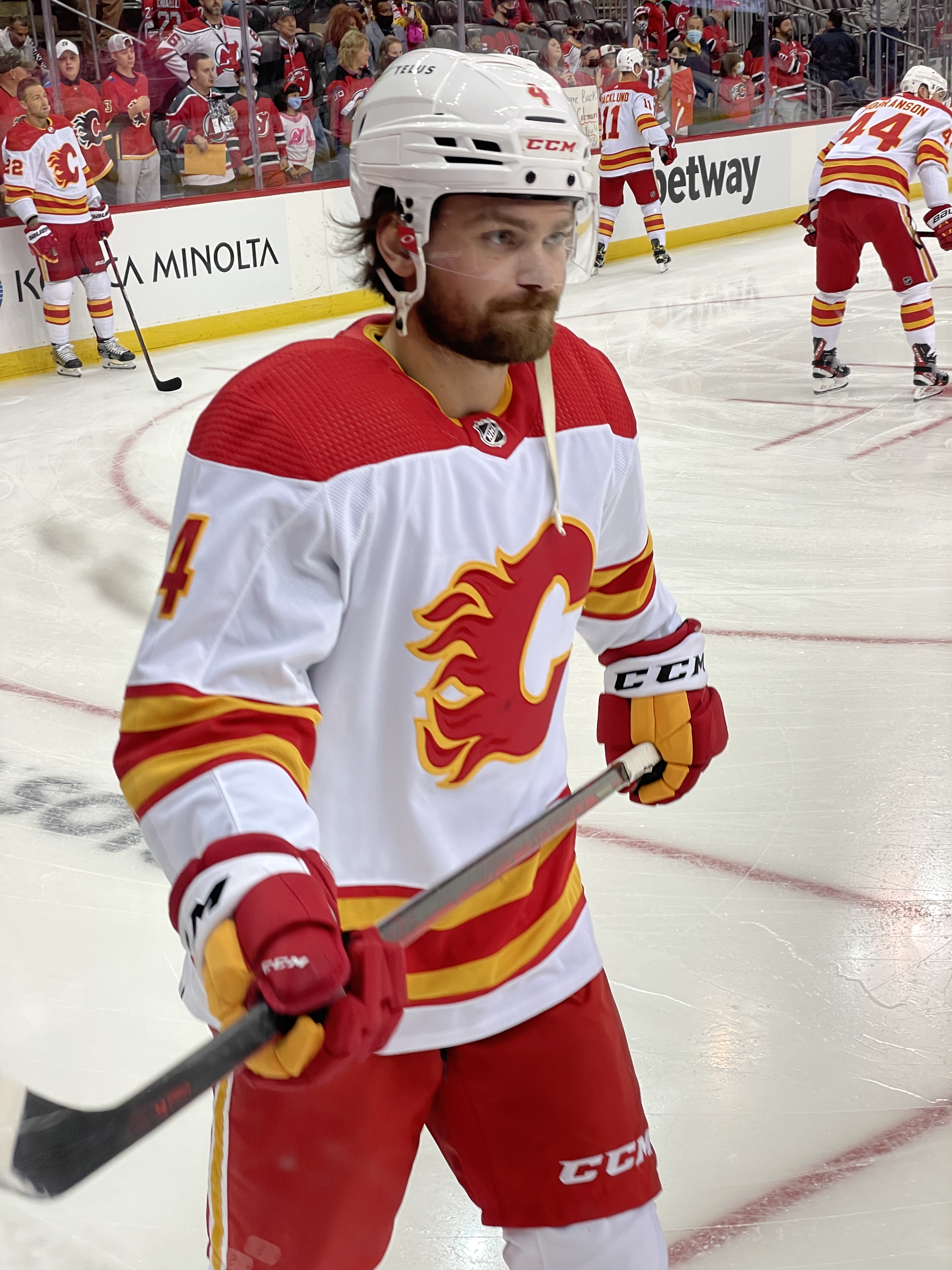
Andersson with the Flames in 2021

Andersson participated in the Flames' 2018–19 training camp but was cut before the final roster was finalized. His reassignment to the Heat was short lived, however, as following the Flames season opener, they placed Travis Hamonic on injured reserve and recalled Andersson to the NHL.

=== Calgary Flames ===
During the 2019–20 season, having established himself amongst the Flames as a top-four pairing defenseman, on 8 January 2020, Andersson signed a six-year, $27.3 million contract extension with the Flames.

Andersson was named alternate captain by the Flames before the 2023–24 season on 7 October 2023. On 21 October, Andersson was suspended for four games by the NHL for charging.

=== Vegas Golden Knights ===
Andersson was traded to the Vegas Golden Knights on 18 January 2026, in exchange for defencemen Zach Whitecloud and Abram Wiebe, a conditional 2027 first-round pick, and a conditional 2028 second-round pick. He signed a seven-year, $59.5 million contract with the Golden Knights on 1 July.

== Personal life ==
Andersson and his wife Tessa have two children, a son and a daughter. He was a close friend of Johnny Gaudreau.

Andersson has participated in the Calgary Flames Celebrity Charity Golf Classic to raise money for the Calgary Flames Foundation. He won the 43rd annual classic in 2024. He often visits the Special Olympics and Alberta Hospital.

== Career statistics ==
=== Regular season and playoffs ===
			Regular season					Playoffs
Season	Team	League	GP	G	A	Pts	PIM	GP	G	A	Pts	PIM
2010–11	Malmö Redhawks	J18	4	0	0	0	2	—	—	—	—	—
2010–11	Malmö Redhawks	J18 Allsv	13	0	1	1	20	—	—	—	—	—
2011–12	Malmö Redhawks	J18	23	6	16	22	47	5	1	1	2	18
2011–12	Malmö Redhawks	J20	13	0	3	3	6	3	0	0	0	0
2012–13	Malmö Redhawks	J18 Allsv	1	0	2	2	0	2	0	2	2	2
2012–13	Malmö Redhawks	J20	8	5	1	6	48	1	0	0	0	2
2012–13	Malmö Redhawks	Allsv	38	3	8	11	22	—	—	—	—	—
2013–14	Malmö Redhawks	J20	8	1	4	5	12	—	—	—	—	—
2013–14	Malmö Redhawks	Allsv	43	3	10	13	26	10	0	1	1	0
2014–15	Barrie Colts	OHL	67	12	52	64	88	9	1	3	4	6
2015–16	Barrie Colts	OHL	64	9	51	60	60	15	2	13	15	16
2016–17	Stockton Heat	AHL	54	3	19	22	38	5	0	0	0	6
2016–17	Calgary Flames	NHL	1	0	0	0	0	—	—	—	—	—
2017–18	Stockton Heat	AHL	56	9	30	39	41	—	—	—	—	—
2017–18	Calgary Flames	NHL	10	0	0	0	4	—	—	—	—	—
2018–19	Calgary Flames	NHL	79	2	17	19	23	5	1	2	3	2
2019–20	Calgary Flames	NHL	70	5	17	22	57	10	3	2	5	6
2020–21	Calgary Flames	NHL	56	6	15	21	34	—	—	—	—	—
2021–22	Calgary Flames	NHL	82	4	46	50	28	12	3	3	6	23
2022–23	Calgary Flames	NHL	79	11	38	49	26	—	—	—	—	—
2023–24	Calgary Flames	NHL	78	9	30	39	47	—	—	—	—	—
2024–25	Calgary Flames	NHL	81	11	20	31	60	—	—	—	—	—
2025–26	Calgary Flames	NHL	48	10	20	30	53	—	—	—	—	—
2025–26	Vegas Golden Knights	NHL	33	7	10	17	18	22	0	6	6	18
NHL totals			617	64	214	278	350	49	7	13	20	49

=== International ===
Rasmus Andersson
Medal record

Men's ice hockey

Representing Sweden

World Championships
Bronze medal – third place	2025 Sweden/Denmark	

Year	Team	Event	Result	GP	G	A	Pts	PIM
2013	Sweden	U18	5th	5	1	0	1	6
2013	Sweden	IH18	7th	4	0	4	4	10
2014	Sweden	U18	4th	7	2	1	3	14
2025	Sweden	4NF	3rd	1	0	0	0	0
2025	Sweden	WC	3rd place, bronze medalist(s)	10	2	4	6	4
2026	Sweden	OG	7th	2	0	0	0	0
Junior totals				16	3	5	8	30
Senior totals				13	2	4	6	4

== Awards and honours ==
Award	Year	Ref
OHL
OHL Second All-Star Team	2015	
CHL Top Prospects Game	2015	
OHL First All-Star Team	2016	
AHL
AHL All-Star Game	2018	
Calgary Flames
Ralph T. Scurfield Humanitarian Award	2024	
