= Peter Andersson (ice hockey, born 1965) =

Swedish ice hockey player and coach

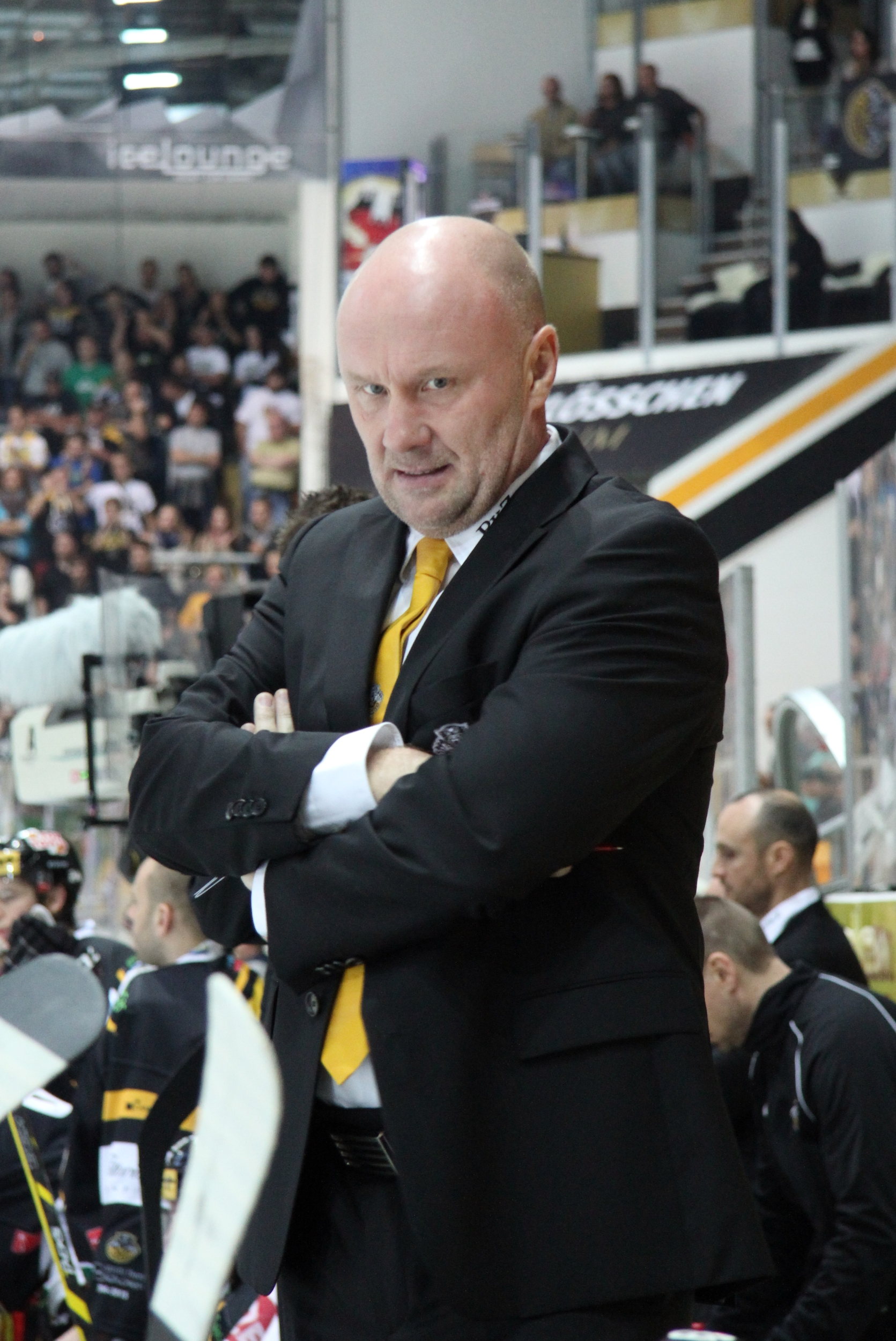
- Peter Andersson coaching HC Lugano during a home game against Genève-Servette HC in October 2014
- Born: 29 August 1965 (age 61) Örebro, Sweden
- Height: 6 ft 0 in (183 cm)
- Weight: 198 lb (90 kg; 14 st 2 lb)
- Position: Defence
- Shot: Left
- Played for: Färjestad BK; Malmö Redhawks; New York Rangers; Florida Panthers; Düsseldorfer EG; HC Lugano
- National team: Sweden
- NHL draft: 73rd overall, 1983; New York Rangers
- Playing career: 1981–2005

Anders Bengt Peter Andersson (born 29 August 1965) is a Swedish former professional ice hockey defenceman and former head coach of Brynäs IF in the Swedish Hockey League (SHL) from 2020 to 2021. In his National Hockey League (NHL) career, he played for the New York Rangers and Florida Panthers. In Europe, he represented Färjestads BK, Düsseldorf EG and IF Malmö Redhawks.

Upon retiring in 2005, Andersson was named general manager of the Redhawks. He stayed as GM for three years before becoming an assistant coach and also head of scouting department for the team. From 2009 to 2013, he was the head coach of Örebro HK. From 2013 to 2016, he served as an assistant coach of Swiss club, HC Lugano of the National League A before returning to his native Sweden in accepting the head coaching role again with the Malmö Redhawks.

Andersson's son, Calle, was selected 119th overall by the New York Rangers in the 2012 NHL entry draft, and his other son Rasmus was selected 53rd by the Calgary Flames in the 2015 NHL draft.

For his achievements during the 2012–2013 ice hockey season, he was awarded Swedish Coach of the Year.

== Career statistics ==
=== Regular season and playoffs ===
			Regular season					Playoffs
Season	Team	League	GP	G	A	Pts	PIM	GP	G	A	Pts	PIM
1981–82	Örebro IK	SWE.2	31	8	5	13	30	—	—	—	—	—
1982–83	Örebro IK	SWE.2	25	10	10	20	26	—	—	—	—	—
1983–84	Färjestad BK	SEL	36	4	7	11	22	—	—	—	—	—
1984–85	Färjestad BK	SEL	35	5	12	17	24	3	0	1	1	4
1985–86	Färjestad BK	SEL	34	4	10	14	18	8	2	2	4	10
1986–87	Färjestad BK	SEL	33	9	8	17	32	7	2	1	3	26
1987–88	Färjestad BK	SEL	39	12	20	32	44	9	2	12	14	8
1988–89	Färjestad BK	SEL	33	6	17	23	44	2	0	0	0	2
1989–90	Malmö IF	SWE.2	33	15	25	40	32	3	3	1	4	2
1990–91	Malmö IF	SEL	34	9	17	26	26	—	—	—	—	—
1991–92	Malmö IF	SEL	40	12	20	32	80	10	3	8	11	2
1992–93	New York Rangers	NHL	31	4	11	15	18	—	—	—	—	—
1992–93	Binghamton Rangers	AHL	27	11	22	33	16	—	—	—	—	—
1993–94	New York Rangers	NHL	8	1	1	2	2	—	—	—	—	—
1993–94	Florida Panthers	NHL	8	1	1	2	0	—	—	—	—	—
1994–95	Malmö IF	SEL	27	1	9	10	18	9	5	0	5	16
1995–96	Malmö IF	SEL	27	7	15	22	14	—	—	—	—	—
1995–96	Düsseldorfer EG	DEL	5	1	4	5	6	13	4	6	10	8
1996–97	Düsseldorfer EG	DEL	45	11	20	31	54	4	1	1	2	0
1996–97	HC Bolzano	ITA	6	0	5	5	8	—	—	—	—	—
1997–98	HC Lugano	NDA	36	11	16	27	26	7	1	5	6	0
1998–99	HC Lugano	NDA	43	11	29	40	38	16	4	15	19	20
1999–2000	HC Lugano	NLA	42	7	33	40	46	12	3	15	18	12
2000–01	HC Lugano	NLA	32	5	18	23	40	13	2	10	12	39
2001–02	MIF Redhawks	SEL	37	7	5	12	30	5	0	2	2	4
2002–03	MIF Redhawks	SEL	45	2	14	16	67	—	—	—	—	—
2003–04	Malmö Redhawks	SEL	46	2	21	23	55	—	—	—	—	—
2004–05	Malmö Redhawks	SEL	44	8	16	24	74	—	—	—	—	—
2008–09	Malmö Redhawks	Allsv	2	0	0	0	4	—	—	—	—	—
SEL totals			510	88	191	279	548	53	14	26	40	72
NHL totals			47	6	13	19	20	—	—	—	—	—
NDA/NLA totals			153	34	96	130	150	48	10	45	55	71

=== International ===
Year	Team	Event	GP	G	A	Pts	PIM
1982	Sweden	EJC	5	0	0	0	2
1983	Sweden	WJC	7	3	0	3	16
1983	Sweden	EJC	5	1	1	2	6
1984	Sweden	WJC	7	0	1	1	4
1985	Sweden	WJC	7	4	10	14	20
1992	Sweden	OG	8	0	1	1	4
1993	Sweden	WC	7	1	6	7	8
1994	Sweden	WC	8	0	1	1	6
2000	Sweden	WC	7	1	3	4	12
2001	Sweden	WC	7	0	0	0	2
Junior totals			31	8	12	20	48
Senior totals			37	2	11	13	32
