= Teemu Kesä =

Finnish ice hockey player

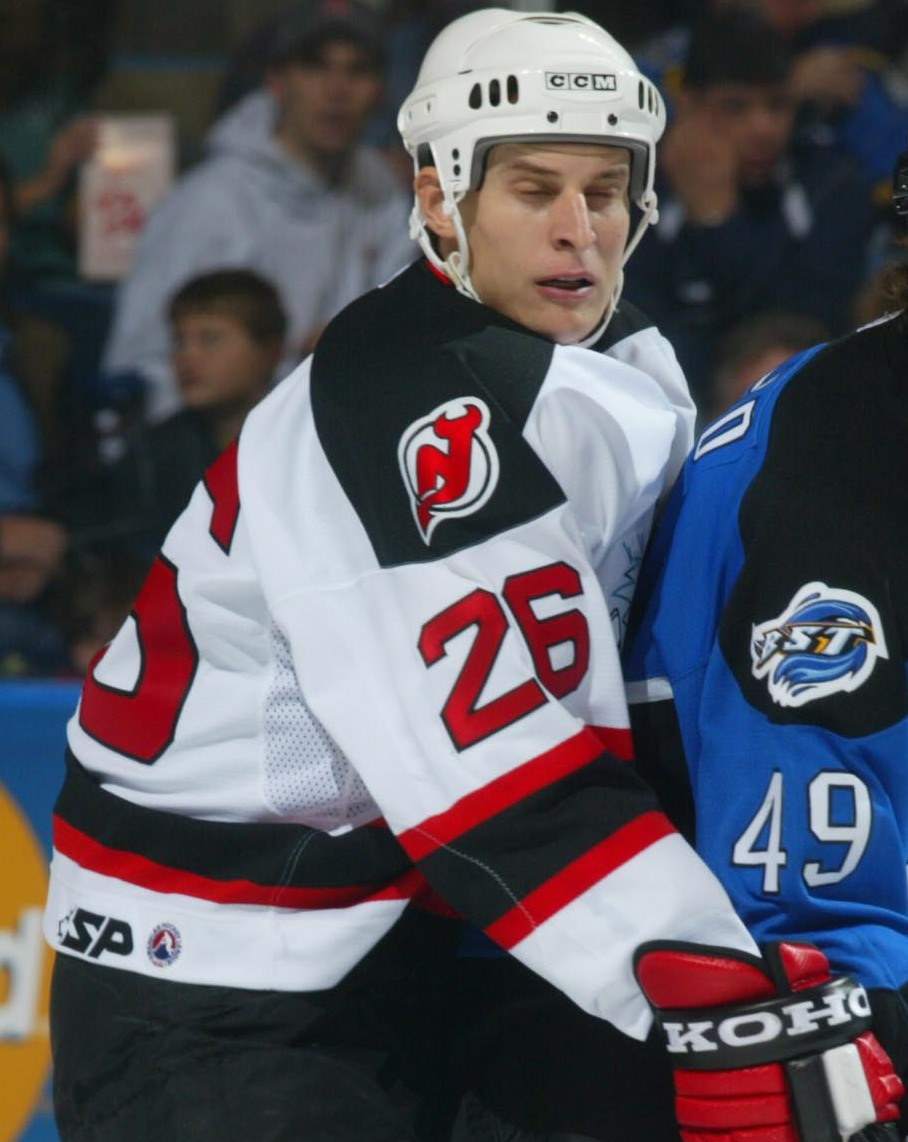
- Kesä with the Albany River Rats in 2004
- Born: June 7, 1981 (age 45) Helsinki, Finland
- Height: 6 ft 1 in (185 cm)
- Weight: 209 lb (95 kg; 14 st 13 lb)
- Position: Defence
- Shot: Right
- Played for: Ilves; Lukko; Albany River Rats; HC TPS; Ässät; SC Bietigheim-Bissingen; Odense Bulldogs; Malmö Redhawks
- NHL draft: 100th overall, 1999; New Jersey Devils
- Playing career: 1999–2014

Teemu Kesä (born June 7, 1981) is a Finnish former professional ice hockey defenceman. He last played for Malmö Redhawks of the Swedish Allsvenskan. He was selected by the New Jersey Devils in the 4th round (100th overall) of the 1999 NHL entry draft.

== Career statistics ==
| | | | Regular season | | | | | Playoffs |
| Season | Team | League | GP | G | A | Pts | PIM | GP | G | A | Pts | PIM |
|---|---|---|---|---|---|---|---|---|---|---|---|---|
| 1996–97 | Tappara U16 | U16 SM-sarja | 32 | 1 | 5 | 6 | 58 | 4 | 1 | 0 | 1 | 29 |
| 1997–98 | Ilves U18 | U18 SM-sarja | 20 | 6 | 1 | 7 | 66 | — | — | — | — | — |
| 1998–99 | Ilves U18 | U18 SM-sarja | 26 | 4 | 5 | 9 | 146 | — | — | — | — | — |
| 1998–99 | Ilves U20 | U20 SM-liiga | 6 | 0 | 1 | 1 | 10 | 10 | 0 | 0 | 0 | 12 |
| 1999–00 | Ilves U20 | U20 SM-liiga | 32 | 2 | 7 | 9 | 92 | — | — | — | — | — |
| 1999–00 | Ilves | SM-liiga | 5 | 0 | 0 | 0 | 8 | — | — | — | — | — |
| 2000–01 | Ilves U20 | U20 SM-liiga | 4 | 1 | 0 | 1 | 41 | — | — | — | — | — |
| 2000–01 | Vaasan Sport | Mestis | 1 | 0 | 1 | 1 | 0 | — | — | — | — | — |
| 2001–02 | Lukko U20 | U20 SM-liiga | 3 | 0 | 4 | 4 | 4 | — | — | — | — | — |
| 2001–02 | Lukko | SM-liiga | 34 | 2 | 0 | 2 | 32 | — | — | — | — | — |
| 2002–03 | Lukko | SM-liiga | 37 | 1 | 0 | 1 | 22 | — | — | — | — | — |
| 2003–04 | Lukko | SM-liiga | 49 | 2 | 2 | 4 | 62 | — | — | — | — | — |
| 2004–05 | Albany River Rats | AHL | 60 | 3 | 7 | 10 | 61 | — | — | — | — | — |
| 2005–06 | Albany River Rats | AHL | 19 | 0 | 2 | 2 | 39 | — | — | — | — | — |
| 2006–07 | HC TPS | SM-liiga | 16 | 1 | 0 | 1 | 16 | — | — | — | — | — |
| 2006–07 | Porin Ässät | SM-liiga | 31 | 2 | 6 | 8 | 45 | — | — | — | — | — |
| 2007–08 | Bietigheim Steelers | Germany2 | 44 | 6 | 16 | 22 | 186 | — | — | — | — | — |
| 2008–09 | Odense Bulldogs | Denmark | 31 | 6 | 11 | 17 | 153 | 11 | 0 | 5 | 5 | 20 |
| 2009–10 | Malmö Redhawks | HockeyAllsvenskan | 31 | 1 | 6 | 7 | 112 | — | — | — | — | — |
| 2010–11 | Ilves | SM-liiga | 47 | 2 | 6 | 8 | 139 | 5 | 0 | 0 | 0 | 6 |
| 2011–12 | Ilves | SM-liiga | 12 | 1 | 1 | 2 | 30 | — | — | — | — | — |
| 2012–13 | Ilves | SM-liiga | 5 | 0 | 0 | 0 | 6 | — | — | — | — | — |
| 2013–14 | Malmö Redhawks | HockeyAllsvenskan | 34 | 0 | 2 | 2 | 112 | 5 | 0 | 1 | 1 | 10 |
| AHL totals | | | 79 | 3 | 9 | 12 | 100 | — | — | — | — | — |
| SM-liiga totals | | | 236 | 11 | 15 | 26 | 360 | 5 | 0 | 0 | 0 | 6 |
