= Patrik Blomberg =

Swedish professional ice hockey player

Patrick Blomberg
- Born: January 27, 1994 (age 32) Stockholm, Sweden
- Height: 1.86 m (6 ft 1 in)
- Weight: 86 kg (190 lb; 13 st 8 lb)
- Position: Left wing
- Shoots: Left
- HockeyAllsvenskan team Former teams: HC Vita Hästen; Timrå IK
- National team: Sweden
- Playing career: 2012–present

Patrick Blomberg (born 27 January 1994) is a Swedish professional ice hockey player. He is currently playing for HC Vita Hästen in HockeyAllsvenskan.

== Career statistics ==
			Regular season					Playoffs
Season	Team	League	GP	G	A	Pts	PIM	GP	G	A	Pts	PIM
2012–13	Malmö Redhawks	Allsvenskan	2	0	0	0	0	—	—	—	—	—
2012–13	Boras HC	Division 1	2	0	0	0	0	—	—	—	—	—
2013–14	Malmö Redhawks	Allsvenskan	13	0	0	0	4	—	—	—	—	—
2014–15	Malmö Redhawks	Allsvenskan	12	0	1	1	0	—	—	—	—	—
2015–16	IK Pantern	Allsvenskan	31	6	8	14	6	—	—	—	—	—
Allsvenskan totals			57	6	9	15	10	—	—	—	—	—
