= Eero Savilahti =

Finnish ice hockey player

- Born: August 10, 1992 (age 32); Tampere, Finland
- Height: 6 ft 1 in (185 cm)
- Weight: 185 lb (84 kg; 13 st 3 lb)
- Position: Forward
- Shoots: Left
- HockeyAllsvenskan team Former teams: IK Oskarshamn; Heilbronner Falken; Ilves
- NHL draft: Undrafted
- Playing career: 2013–present

Eero Savilahti (born August 10, 1992) is a Finnish ice hockey player, who is currently with IK Oskarshamn in the HockeyAllsvenskan.

Savilahti made his Liiga debut playing with Ilves during the 2013–14 Liiga season. He went on to play 232 games for Ilves until he was released on May 2, 2019. In the 2019–20 season, he played for Kiekko-Vantaa and Kovee in the second Finnish league, Mestis, before leaving to play for the Heilbronner Falken.
