= Joakim Eriksson =

Swedish ice hockey player

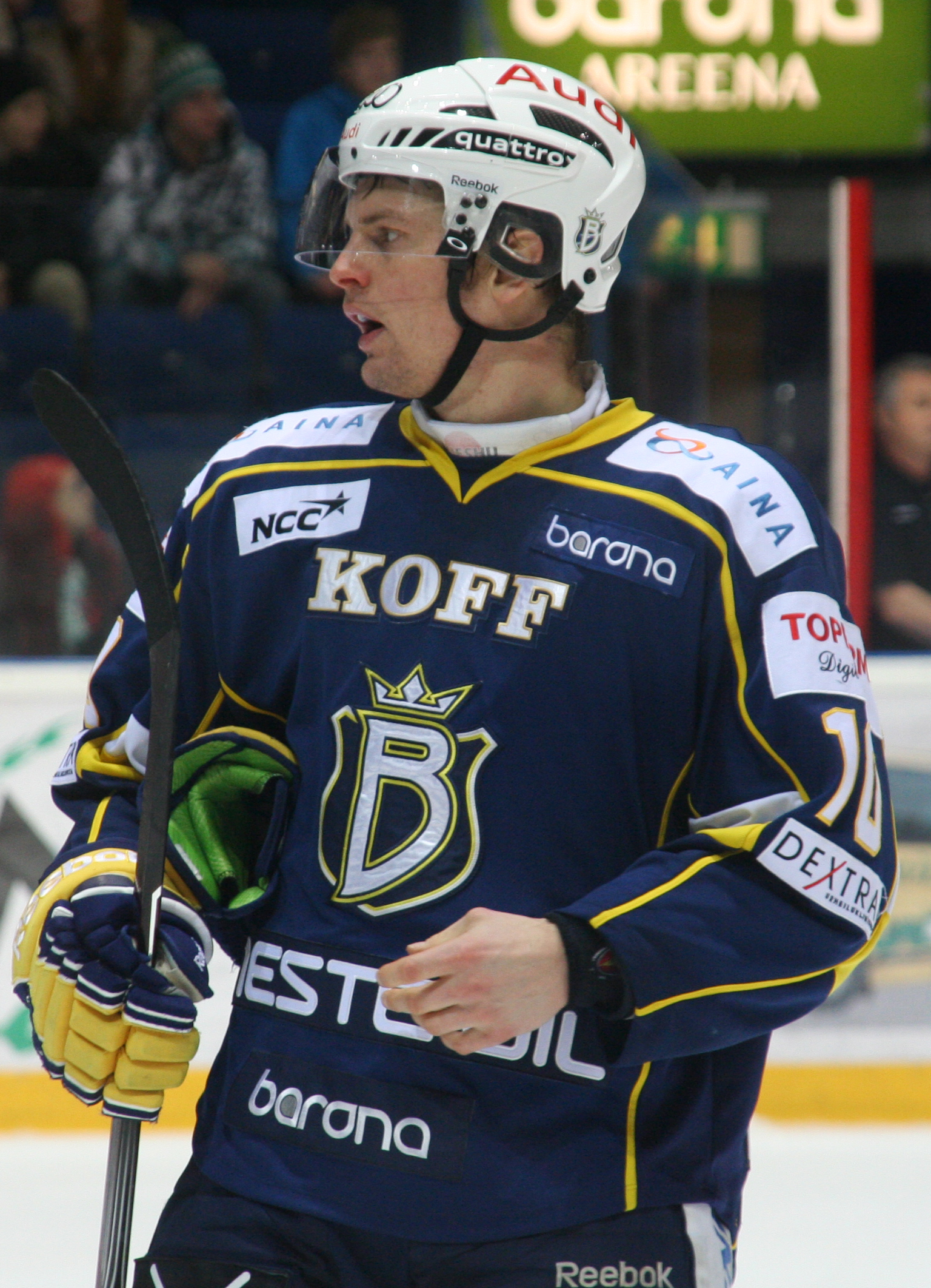
- Born: 22 June 1976 (age 50) Södertälje, Sweden
- Height: 5 ft 11 in (180 cm)
- Weight: 182 lb (83 kg; 13 st 0 lb)
- Position: Centre
- Shot: Left
- Played for: Södertälje SK; Djurgårdens IF; Espoo Blues; Linköpings HC; HIFK
- Playing career: 1996–2015

Joakim Eriksson (born 22 June 1976) is a Swedish retired professional ice hockey player and general manager. He has previously played for SHL teams Djurgårdens IF, Linköpings HC and Södertälje SK. Eriksson also played in Finland for Espoo Blues and HIFK in the SM-liiga.

In 2015, he became general manager of Djurgårdens IF of the Swedish Hockey League (SHL). He left the role in 2021.

== Career statistics ==
			Regular season					Playoffs
Season	Team	League	GP	G	A	Pts	PIM	GP	G	A	Pts	PIM
1992–93	Södertälje SK J18	J18 Elit	—	—	—	—	—	—	—	—	—	—
1993–94	Södertälje SK J18	J18 Elit	—	—	—	—	—	—	—	—	—	—
1993–94	Södertälje SK J18	Juniorserien	—	—	—	—	—	—	—	—	—	—
1993–94	Södertälje SK	Division 1	10	0	0	0	0	2	0	0	0	0
1994–95	Södertälje SK J20	J20 SuperElit	30	11	26	37	26	—	—	—	—	—
1994–95	Södertälje SK	Division 1	4	0	0	0	2	1	0	0	0	0
1995–96	Södertälje SK J20	J20 SuperElit	23	17	26	43	8	—	—	—	—	—
1995–96	Södertälje SK	Division 1	28	5	7	12	10	4	1	0	1	4
1996–97	Södertälje SK	Elitserien	50	4	9	13	12	—	—	—	—	—
1997–98	Södertälje SK	Elitserien	46	4	14	18	18	—	—	—	—	—
1998–99	Södertälje SK	Division 1	42	31	33	64	36	10	2	4	6	4
1999–00	Djurgårdens IF	Elitserien	50	8	9	17	32	13	1	3	4	12
2000–01	Djurgårdens IF	Elitserien	49	7	17	24	32	15	2	5	7	8
2001–02	Djurgårdens IF	Elitserien	50	6	15	21	24	5	0	0	0	2
2002–03	Djurgårdens IF	Elitserien	50	8	14	22	22	12	2	1	3	6
2003–04	Södertälje SK J20	J20 SuperElit	1	1	2	3	0	—	—	—	—	—
2003–04	Södertälje SK	Elitserien	50	15	29	44	24	—	—	—	—	—
2004–05	Södertälje SK	Elitserien	48	11	21	32	26	10	2	6	8	6
2005–06	Espoo Blues	SM-liiga	56	16	33	49	34	9	1	3	4	27
2006–07	Linköping HC	Elitserien	55	12	25	37	42	15	3	8	11	4
2007–08	Linköping HC	Elitserien	55	11	22	33	64	16	2	6	8	18
2008–09	Linköping HC	Elitserien	55	6	32	38	14	7	2	5	7	0
2009–10	Linköping HC	Elitserien	53	6	13	19	20	12	1	3	4	10
2010–11	Södertälje SK	Elitserien	53	8	20	28	46	—	—	—	—	—
2011–12	Linköping HC	Elitserien	12	0	1	1	10	—	—	—	—	—
2011–12	Espoo Blues	SM-liiga	47	12	25	37	30	16	2	7	9	28
2012–13	HIFK Hockey	SM-liig	60	14	23	37	30	8	1	1	2	6
2013–14	Djurgårdens IF	HockeyAllsvenskan	51	10	27	37	38	10	1	8	9	14
2014–15	Djurgårdens IF	SHL	53	7	18	25	32	2	0	1	1	2
SHL (Elitserien) totals			729	113	259	372	418	108	15	38	53	68
SM-liiga totals			163	42	81	123	94	33	4	11	15	61
