= Kalle Hult =

Swedish ice hockey player

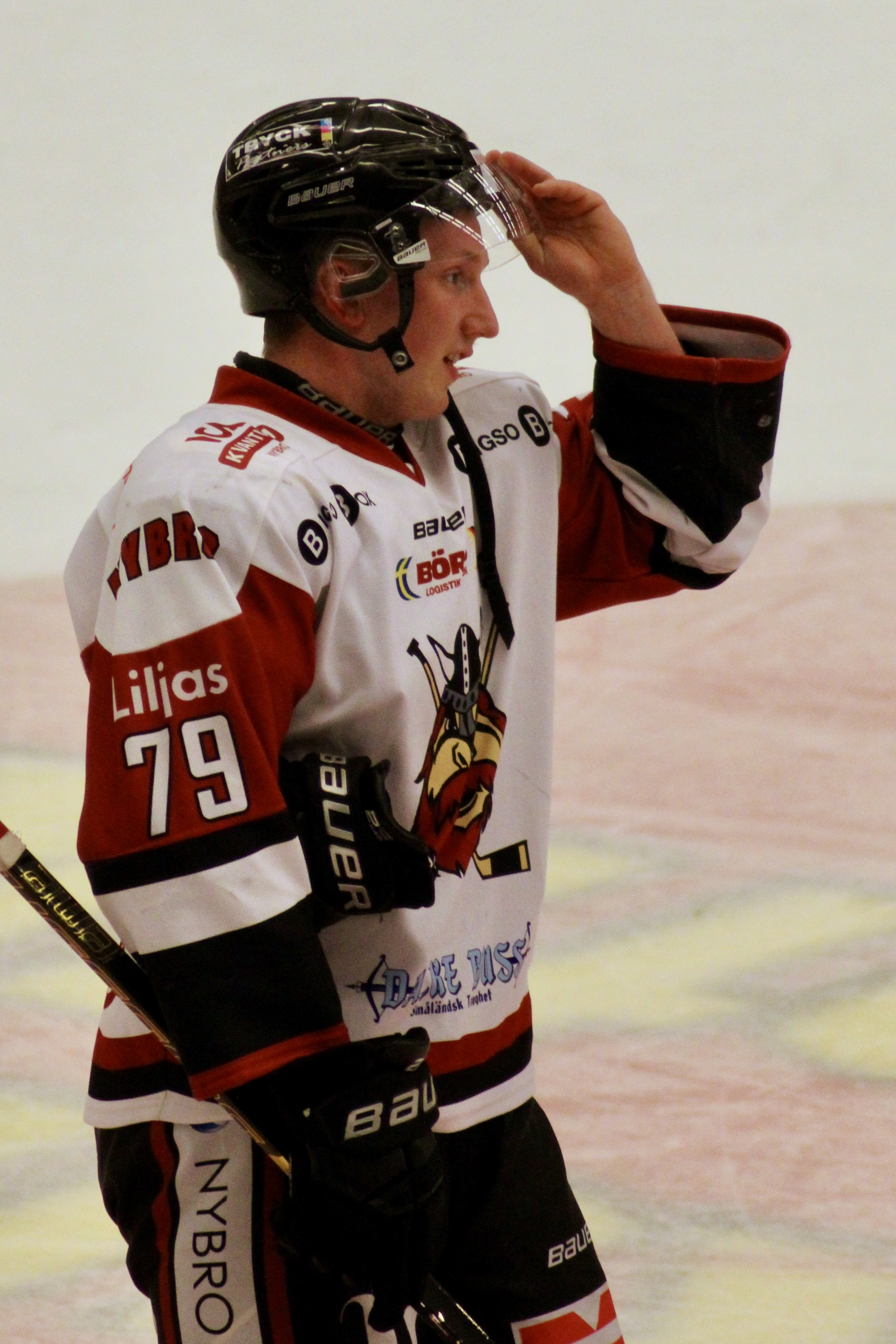
- Born: May 27, 1995 (age 29); Vänersborg, Sweden
- Height: 5 ft 10 in (178 cm)
- Weight: 181 lb (82 kg; 12 st 13 lb)
- Position: Forward
- Shoots: Left
- SHL team: HV71
- NHL draft: Undrafted
- Playing career: 2013–present

Kalle Hult (born May 27, 1995) is a Swedish ice hockey player. He is currently playing with HV71 of the Swedish Hockey League (SHL).

Hult made his Swedish Hockey League debut playing with HV71 during the 2014–15 SHL season.
