= Arena Polarica =

Indoor ice hockey arena in Haparanda, Sweden

Coordinates: 65°50′48″N 24°6′51″E

Norra Finans Arena
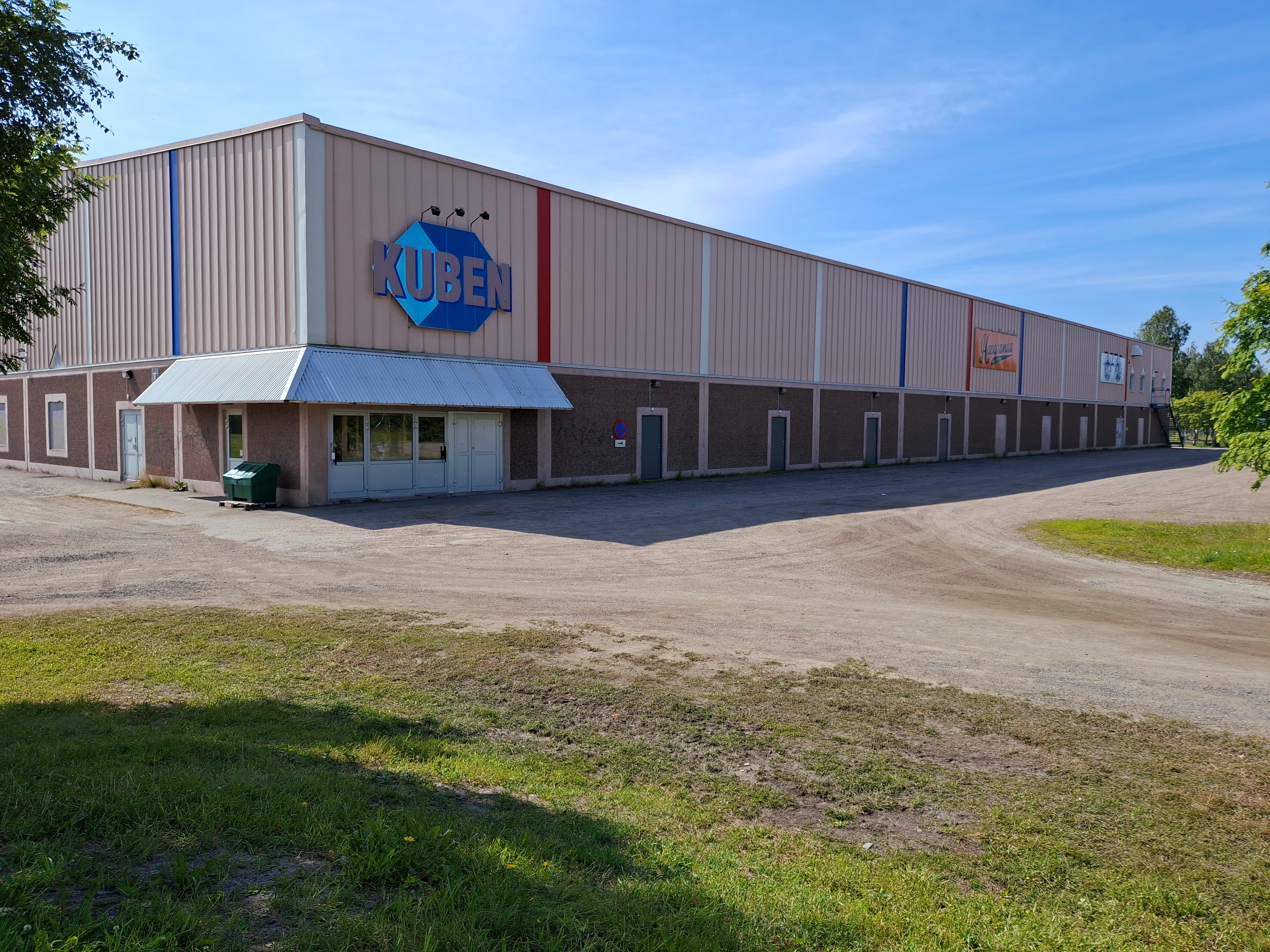
- Interactive map of Norra Finans Arena
- Capacity: 1500
- Surface: ice

Construction
- Opened: 1990

Tenant
- Asplöven HC

The Norra Finans Arena, also called Kuben, is an indoor ice hockey arena in Haparanda, Sweden. Opened in 1990, it has a capacity of 1650 spectators, and serves as the home arena for Asplöven HF of the HockeyEttan.
