= Calle Andersson =

Swedish ice hockey player

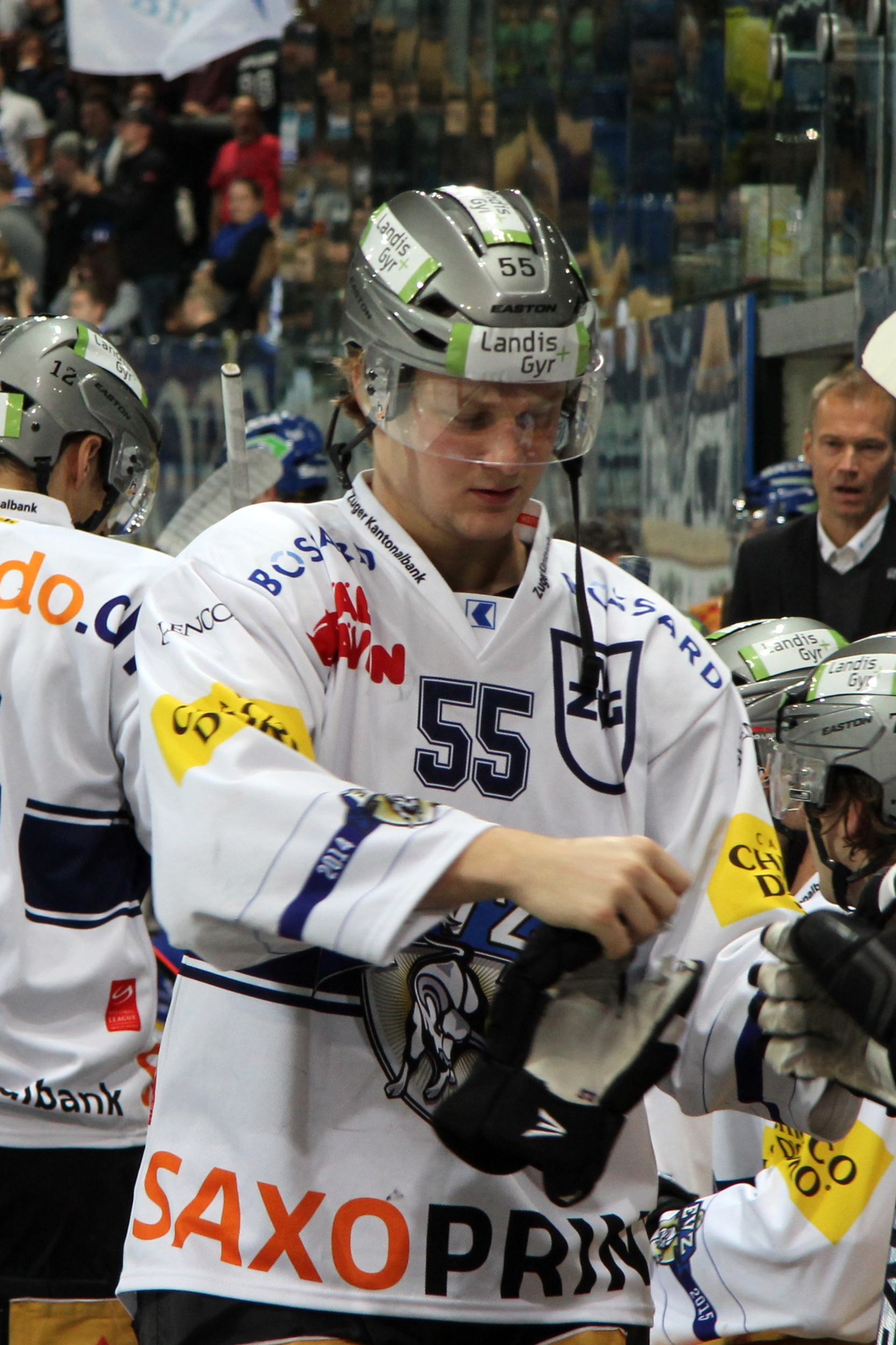
- Born: May 16, 1994 (age 32) Malmö, Sweden
- Height: 6 ft 2 in (188 cm)
- Weight: 212 lb (96 kg; 15 st 2 lb)
- Position: Defence
- Shoots: Right
- NL team Former teams: HC Lugano; Färjestads BK; EV Zug; Hartford Wolf Pack; SC Bern
- NHL draft: 119th overall, 2012; New York Rangers
- Playing career: 2012–present

Calle Andersson (born May 16, 1994) is a Swedish professional ice hockey defenseman who is currently playing with HC Lugano of the National League (NL). While playing with Färjestads BK in the Swedish Elitserien he was drafted as the 119th pick in the 2012 NHL entry draft by the New York Rangers. He is the son of former New York Rangers player, Peter Andersson.

== Playing career ==
On June 2, 2014, Andersson was signed to a three-year entry-level contract with the Rangers. In the 2014–15 season, Andersson left the Swedish leagues, and was loaned by the Rangers to the Swiss National League A with EV Zug and later HC Lugano. After a successful stint with Lugano, it was announced that Andersson would cross the Atlantic, and begin his North American career in the Rangers organization the following season.

In the midst of his second season with the Wolf Pack in 2016–17, Andersson posted 3 assists in just 4 games before he consented to a mutual termination of his contract with the Rangers on November 3, 2016. As a free agent, Andersson opted to return to the Swiss NLA, agreeing to a two-year deal with SC Bern on November 24, 2016.

Following six seasons with SC Bern, Andersson left the club and continued his tenure in the Swiss National League, signing a four-year contract in a return with HC Lugano on 28 March 2022 beginning in the 2022–23 season.

== Career statistics ==
=== Regular season and playoffs ===
			Regular season					Playoffs
Season	Team	League	GP	G	A	Pts	PIM	GP	G	A	Pts	PIM
2010–11	Malmö Redhawks	J20	25	2	4	6	24	—	—	—	—	—
2011–12	Färjestads BK	J20	49	12	24	36	56	6	2	3	5	0
2012–13	Färjestads BK	J20	22	11	16	27	14	4	1	0	1	4
2012–13	Färjestads BK	SEL	34	1	1	2	6	—	—	—	—	—
2012–13	Malmö Redhawks	Allsv	9	2	2	4	4	—	—	—	—	—
2013–14	Malmö Redhawks	J20	8	4	1	5	26	2	0	0	0	0
2013–14	Malmö Redhawks	Allsv	43	2	10	12	10	6	1	0	1	0
2013–14	IK Pantern	Div.1	2	1	0	1	0	—	—	—	—	—
2014–15	EV Zug	NLA	18	1	2	3	6	—	—	—	—	—
2014–15	HC Lugano	NLA	30	5	12	17	16	6	0	3	3	0
2015–16	Hartford Wolf Pack	AHL	43	5	4	9	14	—	—	—	—	—
2016–17	Hartford Wolf Pack	AHL	4	0	3	3	4	—	—	—	—	—
2016–17	SC Bern	NLA	26	2	9	11	14	16	0	1	1	4
2017–18	SC Bern	NL	46	6	12	18	8	11	2	4	6	2
2018–19	SC Bern	NL	50	6	27	33	6	14	0	4	4	0
2019–20	SC Bern	NL	50	10	12	22	42	—	—	—	—	—
2020–21	SC Bern	NL	45	9	18	27	10	9	1	0	1	4
2021–22	SC Bern	NL	49	5	15	20	26	—	—	—	—	—
SHL totals			34	1	1	2	6	—	—	—	—	—
NL totals			314	44	107	151	128	56	3	12	15	10

Medal record

Representing Sweden

Ice hockey

IIHF World U18 Championship
Silver medal – second place	2012 Brno	

=== International ===
Year	Team	Event	Result	GP	G	A	Pts	PIM
2011	Sweden	IH18	2nd place, silver medalist(s)	5	1	1	2	0
2012	Sweden	U18	2nd place, silver medalist(s)	6	0	3	3	0
Junior totals				11	1	4	5	0

== Awards and honours ==
Award	Year
NL
Champion (SC Bern)	2017, 2019
All-Star Team	2019
