= Joey Tenute =

Canadian ice hockey player

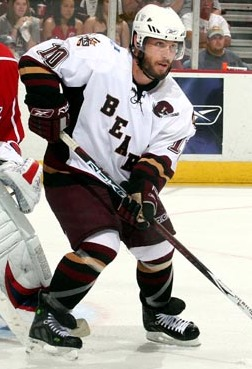
- Tenute in 2007
- Born: April 2, 1983 (age 43) Hamilton, Ontario, Canada
- Height: 5 ft 10 in (178 cm)
- Weight: 192 lb (87 kg; 13 st 10 lb)
- Position: Centre
- Shot: Left
- Played for: Washington Capitals; Jokerit; Frankfurt Lions; Hamburg Freezers; Tappara; EC KAC; Malmö Redhawks; Storhamar Ishockey
- NHL draft: 261st overall, 2003; New Jersey Devils
- Playing career: 2004–2017

Joseph Tenute (born April 2, 1983) is a Canadian former professional ice hockey player who appeared in the National Hockey League (NHL) with the Washington Capitals.

== Playing career ==
Tenute was originally drafted by the New Jersey Devils in 2003 NHL entry draft 261st overall, Tenute was later signed by the Washington Capitals as a free agent in 2005.

Playing primarily for the Hershey Bears of the American Hockey League during the 2005–06 season, he helped guide the team to the Calder Cup. To date he has played one game in the NHL with the Capitals. On July 9, 2007, Tenute was signed as a free agent by the Phoenix Coyotes.

Joey Tenute played for Finnish SM-liiga team Jokerit during the 2008–09 season under coach Glen Hanlon, coincidentally the same coach as in his only NHL game for Washington. During the 2009 off-season, Tenute signed with the Frankfurt Lions. The Lions would cease operations at the 2009–10 season due to financial difficulties and Tenute signed with the Hamburg Freezers.

After two seasons in Germany, Tenute returned to Finland and signed an optional two-year contract with Tappara of the SM-liiga on March 21, 2011.

Midway through the 2012–13 season, on January 7, 2013, Tenute signed a contract with his hometown team, the Hamilton Bulldogs, of the AHL.

On May 16, 2013, Tenute returned to continue his European career in signing an initial one-year contract with the Malmö Redhawks of the then HockeyAllsvenskan.

== Career statistics ==
| | | | Regular season | | | | | Playoffs |
| Season | Team | League | GP | G | A | Pts | PIM | GP | G | A | Pts | PIM |
|---|---|---|---|---|---|---|---|---|---|---|---|---|
| 1998–99 | Caledon Canadians | OPJHL | 4 | 0 | 0 | 0 | 2 | — | — | — | — | — |
| 1999–2000 | Georgetown Raiders | OPJHL | 47 | 27 | 43 | 70 | 34 | — | — | — | — | — |
| 2000–01 | Barrie Colts | OHL | 61 | 13 | 18 | 31 | 38 | 5 | 1 | 1 | 2 | 10 |
| 2001–02 | Barrie Colts | OHL | 66 | 19 | 31 | 50 | 76 | 20 | 7 | 7 | 14 | 28 |
| 2002–03 | Sarnia Sting | OHL | 68 | 41 | 71 | 112 | 75 | 3 | 1 | 2 | 3 | 0 |
| 2003–04 | Sarnia Sting | OHL | 58 | 22 | 56 | 78 | 70 | 3 | 2 | 2 | 4 | 17 |
| 2004–05 | South Carolina Stingrays | ECHL | 68 | 34 | 41 | 75 | 102 | 4 | 2 | 1 | 3 | 0 |
| 2005–06 | Hershey Bears | AHL | 61 | 20 | 30 | 50 | 60 | 19 | 2 | 3 | 5 | 12 |
| 2005–06 | Washington Capitals | NHL | 1 | 0 | 0 | 0 | 0 | — | — | — | — | — |
| 2006–07 | Hershey Bears | AHL | 68 | 28 | 39 | 67 | 58 | 9 | 4 | 1 | 5 | 8 |
| 2007–08 | San Antonio Rampage | AHL | 78 | 21 | 28 | 49 | 72 | 7 | 2 | 0 | 2 | 2 |
| 2008–09 | Jokerit | SM-l | 56 | 17 | 21 | 38 | 60 | 5 | 2 | 1 | 3 | 4 |
| 2009–10 | Frankfurt Lions | DEL | 53 | 15 | 30 | 45 | 59 | 4 | 0 | 1 | 1 | 0 |
| 2010–11 | Hamburg Freezers | DEL | 15 | 2 | 12 | 14 | 16 | — | — | — | — | — |
| 2011–12 | Tappara | SM-l | 18 | 2 | 5 | 7 | 8 | — | — | — | — | — |
| 2011–12 | EC KAC | AUT | 32 | 7 | 16 | 23 | 16 | 16 | 5 | 6 | 11 | 14 |
| 2012–13 | Hamilton Bulldogs | AHL | 40 | 8 | 17 | 25 | 51 | — | — | — | — | — |
| 2013–14 | Malmö Redhawks | Allsv | 49 | 16 | 34 | 50 | 36 | 10 | 2 | 3 | 5 | 10 |
| 2014–15 | Malmö Redhawks | Allsv | 39 | 12 | 23 | 35 | 30 | — | — | — | — | — |
| 2015–16 | Malmö Redhawks | SHL | 46 | 5 | 16 | 21 | 26 | — | — | — | — | — |
| 2016–17 | Storhamar Dragons | NOR | 28 | 10 | 18 | 28 | 26 | 6 | 0 | 1 | 1 | 14 |
| 2017–18 | Hamilton Steelhawks | ACH | 2 | 0 | 2 | 2 | 2 | 4 | 1 | 2 | 3 | 4 |
| AHL totals | | | 247 | 77 | 114 | 191 | 241 | 35 | 8 | 4 | 12 | 22 |
| NHL totals | | | 1 | 0 | 0 | 0 | 0 | — | — | — | — | — |
