= Rävemåla =

- Location within Kronoberg Location within Sweden
- Coordinates: 56°33′N 15°16′E
- Country: Sweden
- Province: Småland
- County: Kronoberg County
- Municipality: Tingsryd Municipality

Area
  - Total: 0.61 km^{2} (0.24 sq mi)

Population (31 December 2010)
  - Total: 294
  - Density: 480/km^{2} (1,200/sq mi)
- Time zone: UTC+1 (CET)
  - Summer (DST): UTC+2 (CEST)

Rävemåla is a locality situated in Tingsryd Municipality, Kronoberg County, Sweden with 294 inhabitants in 2010.
