= Pontus Sjögren =

Swedish ice hockey player

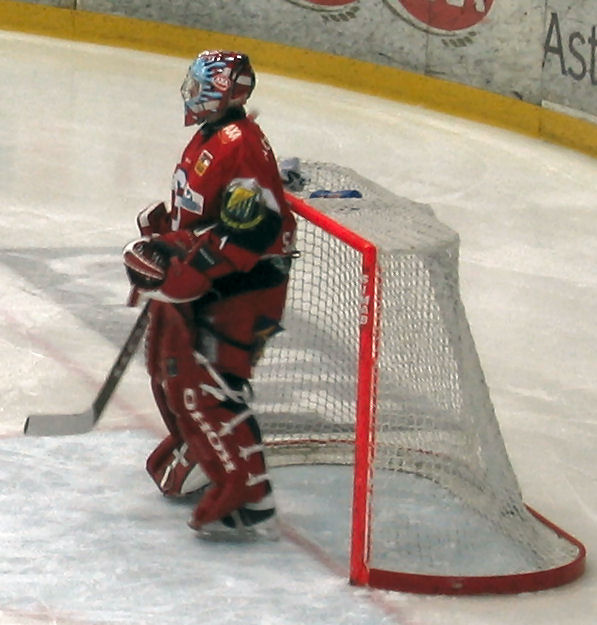
- Born: 13 April 1985 (age 41) Stockholm
- Height: 5 ft 11 in (180 cm)
- Weight: 174 lb (79 kg; 12 st 6 lb)
- Position: Goaltender
- Caught: Left
- EIHL team Former teams: Dundee Stars; Huddinge IK
- National team: Sweden
- NHL draft: Undrafted
- Playing career: 2005–2019

Pontus Sjögren (born 13 April 1985) is a former Swedish professional ice hockey goaltender, who last played for Dundee Stars in the EIHL. His youth team is IFK Tumba.
