= IK Oskarshamn =

Coordinates: 57°15′50.8″N 16°26′08″E

- City: Oskarshamn, Sweden
- League: HockeyAllsvenskan
- Founded: 1970
- Home arena: Be-Ge Hockey Center (capacity: 3,275)
- Colours
- General manager: Arsi Piispanen
- Head coach: Jeff Jakobs
- Website: ikoskarshamn.se

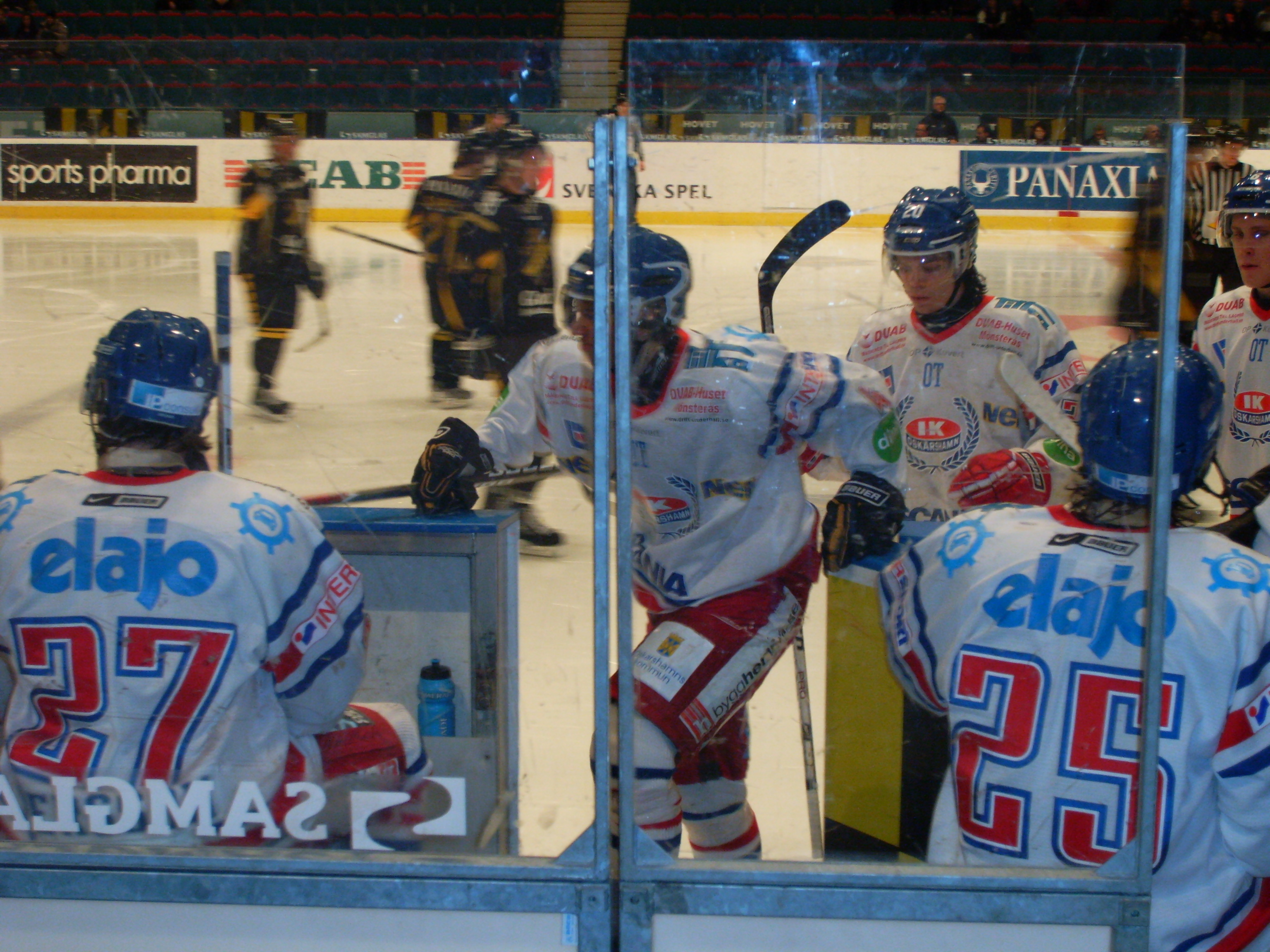
IK Oskarshamn (white uniforms) in a game against AIK.

Idrottsklubben Oskarshamn, commonly known as IK Oskarshamn, is a Swedish professional ice hockey club from Oskarshamn, Sweden. The team plays in the second-highest league, the HockeyAllsvenskan. The 2019–20 season was the team's first season in the top-tier league, the Swedish Hockey League.

== History ==
IK Oskarshamn (abbreviated as IKO) was founded on 27 May 1970, when the ice hockey sections of Oskarshamns AIK and IFK Oskarshamn, were merged into one club. Originally known as AIK–IFK Oskarshamn, the team adopted the name IK70, for the 1972–73 season, and finally IK Oskarshamn, for the 1986–87 season.

The team thrice reached the final qualification stage for the highest league in Sweden before their promotion there. This happened in the 2000–01, 2004–05 as well as the 2018–19 season, in which the club were promoted to the highest league in Sweden for the first time in club history. The team plays its home games in Be-Ge Hockey Center, which has a capacity for 3,275 people. The arena was first built in November 1974, but was completely renovated and enlarged during the 2004–05 season.

=== Seasons ===
In the 2000–01 season and in the 2004–05 seasons, IK Oskarshamn succeeded to reach the Kvalserien. In the Kvalserien, the team finished in 5th place the first year and in 6th place the second year. In the 2010–11 season, IK Oskarshamn finished 9th, six points from playing in the new pre-qualification.

Both in 2011–12 season and in 2012–13 season IK Oskarshamn finished in the top-7 and reached the playoff round. Evan McGrath was the top scorer in the HockeyAllsvenskan regular season with 50 points in 52 games.

== Players and personnel ==
=== Current roster ===
No.	Nat	Player	Pos	S/G	Age	Acquired	Birthplace
27	(United States)	Nolan Walker	C	R	28	2024	Anchorage, US
13	(Sweden)	Rasmus Bengtsson	D	L	33	2022	Landskrona, Sweden
22	(Canada)	Erik Bradford	C	L	32	2024	Orangeville, Canada
3	(Sweden)	Niclas Burström	D	L	35	2022	Skellefteå, Sweden
90	(Canada)	Liam Hawel	RW	R	27	2024	Arnprior, Ontario
20	(Sweden)	Joel Jonsson	LW	L	22	2024	Brunflo, Sweden
19	(Sweden)	Viktor Smeds	C	R	22	2024	Helsingborg, Sweden
26	(Sweden)	Ville Jonsson	D	L	22	2024	Örnsköldsvik, Sweden
49	(United States)	Michael Joyaux	D	R	29	2024	Bloomingdale, US
21	(Sweden)	Hampus Karlsson	C	L	25	2023	Landsbro, Sweden
9	(Finland)	Eero Savilahti	LW	L	34	2024	Tampere, Finland
58	(Sweden)	Hugo Jonasson	D	L	23	2024	Ljungby, Sweden
35	(Sweden)	Emil Kruse	G	L	31	2023	Karlstad, Sweden
24	(Sweden)	Axel Wemmenborn	C	L	34	2024	Kristianstad, Sweden
14	(Sweden)	Max Eriksson	D	L	21	2024	Sweden
71	(Sweden)	Filip Svenningsson	LW	L	27	2024	Gislaved, Sweden
38	(Sweden)	Axel Landén	D	R	21	2024	Jönköping, Sweden
14	(Sweden)	Lukas Vesterlund	C	L	22	2024	Härnösand, Sweden
57	(United States)	Evan Weinger	RW	R	29	2024	Los Angeles, US
25	(United States)	Carter Camper	RW	R	38	2024	Rocky River, Ohio, US
23	(Sweden)	Gustaf Westlund	C	L	28	2023	Paris, France
30	(Sweden)	Tomas Rydén	G	L	32	2024	Karlstad, Sweden
33	(Sweden)	Ludvig Östman	D	L	27	2024	Borlänge, Sweden
29	(Sweden)	Georg Weigelt	C	L	24	2024	Stockholm, Sweden

Source: eliteprospects.comAs of 17 November 2024.

=== Head coaches ===
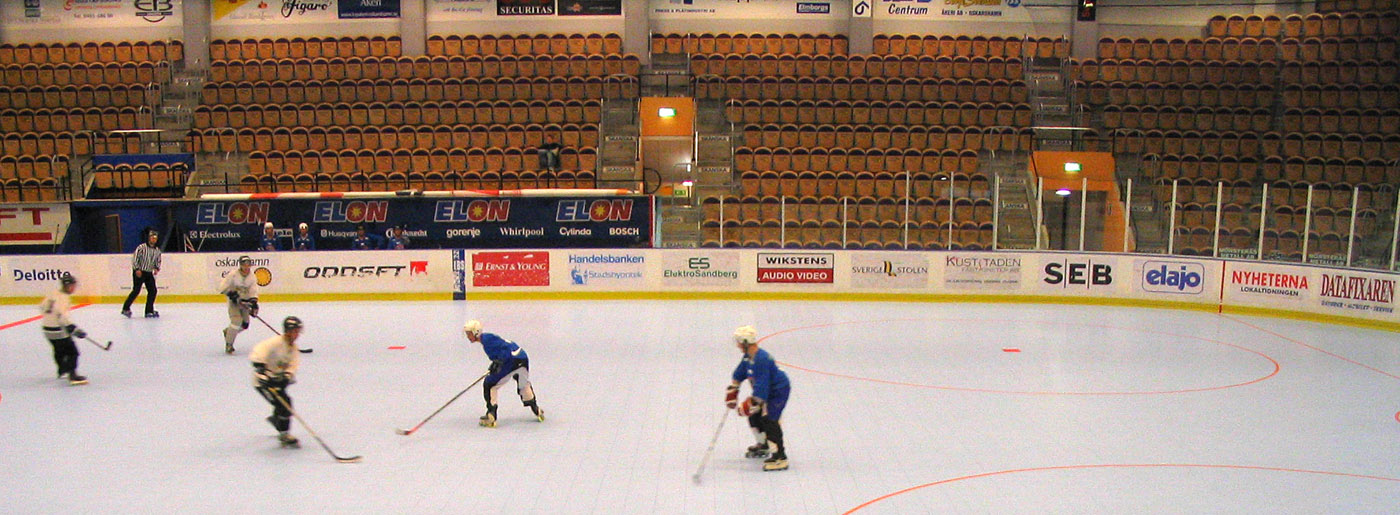
IKO play their home games in Arena Oskarshamn.

Head coaches of IK Oskarshamn
Name	Year
Gunnar Thallberg	1970–1972
Christer Myhren	1972–1974
Kurt Svensson	1974–1975
Tommy Pettersson	1975–1978
Per Bäckman	1978–1981
Rolf Marklund	1981–1982
Morgan Svensson	1982–1985
Ulf Woxö	1985–1986
Ulf Woxö, Göran Håkansson	1986
Ulf Woxö, Peder Liedberg	1986–1987
Göran Håkansson, Stig Forsberg	1987–1988
Karl-Axel Jönsson	1988–1989
Hansove Norberg	1989–1991
Torbjörn Hedvall	1991–1994
Hasse Sjöö	1994–1995
Torbjörn Hedvall	1995
Ivan Hansen	1995–1998
Björn Åkerblom	1998–1999
Mats Weiderståhl	1999–2000
Matti Heikklä	2000
Ola Hyden, Michael Larsson	2001
Joakim Fagervall	2001–2004
Daniel Broberg	2004–2006
Peter Ekroth	2006
Staffan Lundh	2006–2007
Michael Larsson, Mats Johansson	2007
Charles Franzén	2007–2009
Tommy Salo	2009–2010
Lenny Eriksson	2010
Lars Ivarsson	2010–2011
Fredrik Söderström	2011–2017
Björn Hellkvist	2017–2018
Håkan Åhlund	2018–2020
Per-Erik Johnsson	2020
Martin Filander	2020–2024
Björn Karlsson	2024–2025
Albin Blomqvist, Mikael Sandberg	2025
Tero Lehterä	2025
Jeff Jakobs	2025–

=== Honored members ===
IK Oskarshamn retired numbers
No.	Player	Position	Career	No. retirement
4	Skeeter Moore	C	1992–1996	6 December 2010
5	Peter Ekroth	D	1992–1997	6 December 2010
12	Alexander Johansson	D	1999–2011	27 December 2011
15	Fredric Jaensson	LW	1998–2008	20 September 2008
28	Thomas Gustafsson	RW	1996–2006	
17	Jonas Engström	LW	2015–2019; 2019–2024	31 October 2026

Thomas Gustafsson totaled 229 points for Oskarshamn in ten seasons. He is the first player in IK Oskarshamn to have his number retired and hoisted to the roof.

Fredric Jaensson played a total of nine seasons in the club. Notably, when he left the club after the 2007–08 season, he had a total of 318 points in the HockeyAllsvenskan. It was at that time the most points of all Allsvenskan players in franchise history. His Jersey was hoisted to the rafters on 20 September 2008.

Skeeter Moore and Peter Ekroth were recruited to the club in 1992 by then chairman Evert Mellström. The acquisitions were notable because the players came from the Elitserien with IK Oskarshamn then playing in Division 3. In only three seasons, the team climbed from division 3 to the division 1 (HockeyAllsvenskan) the country's second-tier competition. During a celebration ceremony on December 6, 2010, Ekroth's and Moore's jerseys were hoisted up in the roof of Arena Oskarshamn.

Alexander Johansson is an IKO icon that came to the club in the 1999–2000 season and played 528 matches in 12 seasons for the club. The 2010–11 season was his last season for IK Oskarshamn. The club raised his jersey to the rafters in a pre-game ceremony against Leksands IF on 27 December 2011.

== Notable former players ==
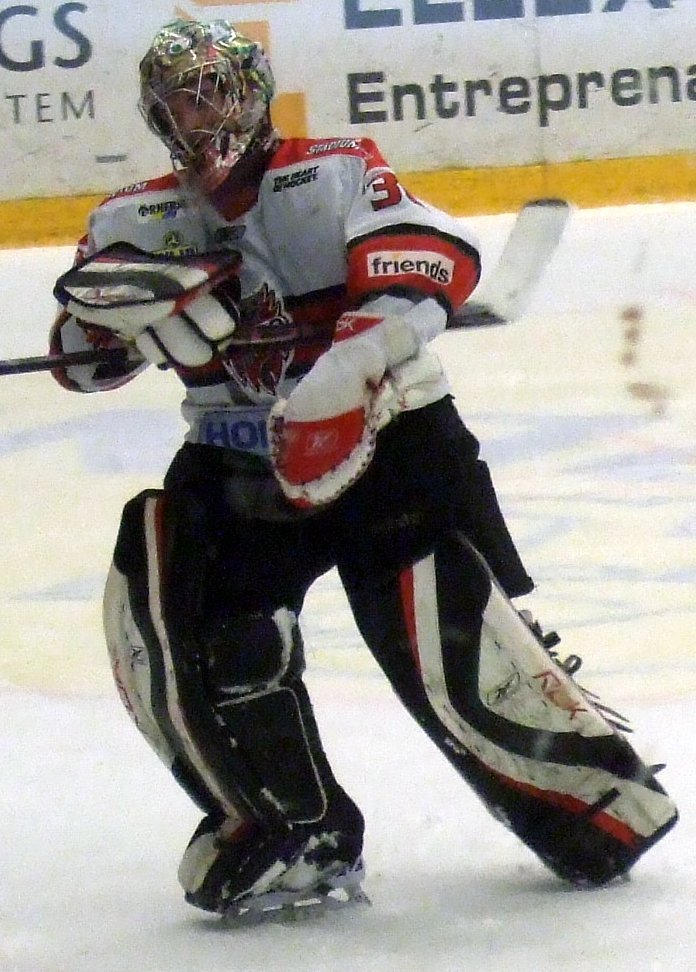
Goaltender Michal Zajkowski

- Per Gustafsson
- Mathias Johansson
- Greg Mauldin
- Niklas Hjalmarsson
- Stefan Pettersson
- David Rodman
- Evan McGrath
- Eetu Qvist
- Dale Weise
