= 2013–14 HockeyAllsvenskan season =

- League: HockeyAllsvenskan
- Sport: Ice hockey
- Teams: 14
- Total attendance: 1,097,855
- Average attendance: 3,016
- TV partner: Viasat
- First place: Malmö Redhawks
- Top scorer: Joey Tenute (MIF)
- Promoted to SHL: Djurgårdens IF
- Relegated to Division 1: IF Troja/Ljungby

HockeyAllsvenskan seasons
- 2012–13 2014–15

The 2013–14 HockeyAllsvenskan season began on 12 September 2013 and included 14 teams. IF Björklöven, Swedish champions in 1987, rejoined the league, following a three-year stint in Division 1 (now named Hockeyettan) after their near-bankruptcy in 2010. They replaced Tingsryds AIF, who were demoted to Division 1 following a third-place finish in the 2013 HockeyAllsvenskan qualifiers. Also new to the league were Timrå IK and Rögle BK, both of whom were demoted from Elitserien (now called the SHL), replacing Leksands IF and Örebro HK who were promoted up to the SHL in their stead.

The 2013–14 HockeyAllsvenskan was covered by media partner Viasat, who purchased the rights to the league in 2011.

== Format ==
In the regular season, each team plays every other team twice at home and twice away, which gives each team a 52-game schedule. Following the regular season, the two teams with the worst records are forced to play a qualification tournament (Swedish: Kvalserien till HockeyAllsvenskan) to avoid demotion to Sweden's third-tier league, Division 1 (now named Hockeyettan). The teams that finished 4th–7th advanced to a double-round robin playoff series, the winner of which joined the top three teams in the SHL qualifiers, where they will have a chance to qualify for promotion to the Swedish Hockey League, in competition with the two teams with the worst records from the 2013–14 SHL season.

== Participating teams ==
2013–14 HockeyAllsvenskan team map

Team	City	Arena	Capacity
Almtuna IS	Uppsala	Metallåtervinning Arena	2,800
Asplöven HC	Haparanda	Arena Polarica	1,500
IF Björklöven	Umeå	T3 Center	5,400
Djurgårdens IF	Stockholm	Hovet	8,094
BIK Karlskoga	Karlskoga	Nobelhallen	6,300
Karlskrona HK	Karlskrona	Telenor Arena Karlskrona	3,464
IF Malmö Redhawks	Malmö	Malmö Arena	13,000
Mora IK	Mora	FM Mattsson Arena	4,514
IK Oskarshamn	Oskarshamn	Arena Oskarshamn	3,346
Rögle BK	Ängelholm	Lindab Arena	5,150
Södertälje SK	Södertälje	AXA Sports Center	6,130
Timrå IK	Timrå	E.ON Arena	6,000
Troja/Ljungby	Ljungby	Sunnerbohov	3,700
VIK Västerås HK	Västerås	ABB Arena Nord	4,920

== Regular season ==
=== Standings ===
Pos	Team	Pld	W	OTW	OTL	L	GF	GA	GD	Pts	
1	Malmö Redhawks	52	30	5	5	12	160	113	+47	105	Advance to SHL qualifiers
2	VIK Västerås	52	26	9	4	13	134	104	+30	100	Advance to SHL qualifiers
3	Djurgårdens IF	52	23	8	11	10	152	111	+41	96	Advance to SHL qualifiers
4	BIK Karlskoga	52	25	5	9	13	158	120	+38	94	Advance to playoffs
5	Karlskrona HK	52	25	3	4	20	154	119	+35	85	Advance to playoffs
6	Mora IK	52	19	9	5	19	154	133	+21	80	Advance to playoffs
7	Rögle BK	52	21	6	5	20	131	141	−10	80	Advance to playoffs
8	Timrå IK	52	18	6	10	18	124	125	−1	76	
9	IK Oskarshamn	52	19	4	6	23	134	157	−23	71	
10	Almtuna IS	52	14	9	9	20	117	132	−15	69	
11	Asplöven HC	52	18	6	3	25	126	153	−27	69	
12	Södertälje SK	52	16	6	6	24	124	147	−23	66	
13	IF Troja/Ljungby	52	8	9	9	26	111	166	−55	51	Advance to HockeyAllsvenskan qualifiers
14	IF Björklöven	52	13	4	3	32	112	170	−58	50	Advance to HockeyAllsvenskan qualifiers

== Post-season ==
=== Playoffs ===
A playoff series (Swedish: PlayOff-serien, in previous seasons Förkvalserien) was played between the teams ranked fourth through seventh in the regular season. They played a double round-robin tournament, with the winner (Rögle BK) continuing to the qualifiers for the 2014–15 SHL season. The teams were allocated points before the start of the playoffs based on their position in the regular season standings. BIK Karlskoga were given four points, Karlskrona HK were given three points, Mora IK were given two points and Rögle BK were given one point.

Pos	Team	Pld	W	OTW	OTL	L	GF	GA	GD	Pts	Qualification
1	Rögle BK	6	4	2	0	0	21	11	+10	16	Advance to SHL qualifiers
2	Karlskrona HK	6	3	1	1	1	23	15	+8	12	Return to HockeyAllsvenskan for the 2014–15 season
3	BIK Karlskoga	6	1	0	1	4	13	23	−10	4	Return to HockeyAllsvenskan for the 2014–15 season
4	Mora IK	6	1	0	1	4	18	26	−8	4	Return to HockeyAllsvenskan for the 2014–15 season

=== SHL qualifiers ===
2014 Kvalserien	GP	W	T	L	OTW	OTL	GF	GA	+/–	Pts
Örebro HK^{k}	10	6	2	2	1	1	32	21	+11	21
Djurgårdens IF^{k}	10	5	1	4	1	0	31	26	+5	17
Rögle BK^{e}	10	4	3	3	2	1	32	29	+3	17
Malmö Redhawks^{e}	10	4	2	4	1	1	25	27	–2	15
AIK^{e}	10	3	2	5	0	2	21	23	–2	11
VIK Västerås HK^{e}	10	2	2	6	1	1	19	34	–15	9

k – qualified for 2014–15 SHL season; e – qualified for 2014–15 HockeyAllsvenskan season

== HockeyAllsvenskan qualifiers ==
Teams ranked 13th and 14th after the regular season, IF Troja/Ljungby and IF Björklöven, were forced to defend their spots in the league in the HockeyAllsvenskan qualifiers (Swedish: Kvalserien till HockeyAllsvenskan). They played a double round-robin tournament against the four playoff winners from the third-tier Division 1. IF Björklöven successfully defended their HockeyAllsvenskan spot while IF Troja/Ljungby were relegated to Division 1 at the expense of HC Vita Hästen.

Pos	Team	Pld	W	OTW	OTL	L	GF	GA	GD	Pts	
1	HC Vita Hästen (P)	10	6	2	1	1	44	28	+16	23	Qualify for play in the 2014–15 HockeyAllsvenskan season
2	IF Björklöven	10	6	0	3	1	31	23	+8	21	Qualify for play in the 2014–15 HockeyAllsvenskan season
3	IF Troja/Ljungby (R)	10	4	2	0	4	31	26	+5	16	Qualify for play in the 2014–15 Hockeyettan season
4	Tingsryds AIF	10	3	1	2	4	31	26	+5	13	Qualify for play in the 2014–15 Hockeyettan season
5	Kallinge-Ronneby IF	10	3	0	0	7	25	38	−13	9	Qualify for play in the 2014–15 Hockeyettan season
6	Piteå HC	10	2	1	0	7	24	37	−13	8	Qualify for play in the 2014–15 Hockeyettan season

(P) Promoted; (R) Relegated
