= List of HockeyAllsvenskan seasons =

This is a list of seasons of HockeyAllsvenskan, including its predecessor, "Allsvenskan". The name "Allsvenskan", meaning "All-Swedish", has been used unofficially since early in the history of ice hockey in Sweden, but first gained official use in 1983 as the name of a spring tournament for the best ranked teams from Division I, which at the time was the second tier of Swedish hockey. Allsvenskan first became a stand-alone league for the 1999–2000 season, then divided into a northern and southern group. During this period, the top teams from each group would break off after the Christmas break to play in a new group called SuperAllsvenskan. Starting with the 2005–06 season, the two groups of 12 teams were merged into one group of 16 (later reduced to 14), and the league gained its current name, HockeyAllsvenskan.

== List of Allsvenskan seasons ==
No.	Season	Best record (Allsvenskan Norra)	Best record (Allsvenskan Södra)	Best record (SuperAllsvenskan)	Promoted to Elitserien	Relegated to Division 1
1	1999–2000	IF Björklöven	Rögle BK	Timrå IK	Timrå IK; IF Björklöven	Arlanda Wings HC; Huddinge IK; Sunne IK; Grums IK
2	2000–01	IK Nyköpings NH 90	Linköpings HC	Södertälje SK	Södertälje SK; Linköpings HC	Vallentuna BK; IFK Kumla; Mölndals IF
3	2001–02	IF Björklöven	Leksands IF	Leksands IF	Leksands IF	Almtuna IS; Gislaveds SK; Tierps HK
4	2002–03	Hammarby IF	Rögle BK	Hammarby IF	none	Kiruna IF; Örnsköldsviks SK; Tranås AIF
5	2003–04	Skellefteå AIK	IK Oskarshamn	Mora IK	Mora IK	HC Örebro 90; Vallentuna BK
6	2004–05	Leksands IF	Rögle BK	Leksands IF	Leksands IF	League contraction: Bodens IK; Huddinge IK; IF Troja/Ljungby; Mörrums GoIS IK; Piteå HC; Skövde IK; Tegs SK; Team Uppsala HC

== List of HockeyAllsvenskan seasons ==
No.	Season	Start (regular season)	End (regular season)	End (post-season)	Best record	Promoted to Elitserien	Relegated to Division 1	Average atnd. (regular season)	Top scorer (regular season)
1 (7)	2005–06	28 September	8 March	12 April	IF Malmö Redhawks	IF Malmö Redhawks; Skellefteå AIK	none	1,996	Johan Åkerman (SAIK)
2 (8)	2006–07	27 September	23 February	3 April	Södertälje SK	Södertälje SK	IFK Arboga IK	1,887	Pär Arlbrandt (Rögle)
3 (9)	2007–08	14 September	5 March	10 April	Leksands IF	Rögle BK	Hammarby IF*; *Dissolved due to bankruptcy	2,007	Jens Bergenström (LIF)
4 (10)	2008–09	17 September	27 February	9 April	Leksands IF	none	Mariestad BoIS HC; Nybro Vikings IF; Huddinge IK	2,363	Pär Arlbrandt (VIK)
5 (11)	2009–10	16 September	7 March	11 April	Leksands IF	AIK	none	2,362	Conny Strömberg (ÖHK)
6 (12)	2010–11	14 September	2 March	8 April	Växjö Lakers HC	Växjö Lakers HC	none	2,363	Conny Strömberg (ÖHK)
7 (13)	2011–12	19 September	2 March	6 April	Örebro HK	Rögle BK	IF Sundsvall Hockey; Borås HC	2,610	Broc Little (VIK)
8 (14)	2012–13	12 September	2 March	5 April	Leksands IF	Leksands IF	Tingsryds AIF	2,252	Evan McGrath (IKO)
9 (15)	2013–14	12 September	4 March	April	Malmö Redhawks	Djurgårdens IF	IF Troja/Ljungby	3,016	Joey Tenute (MIF)
10 (16)	2014–15	10 September	28 February	2 April	Västerås IK	Karlskrona HK; Rögle BK; Malmö Redhawks	Södertälje SK	2,986	Jacob Lagacé (ASP)
11 (17)	2015–16	11 September	28 February	2 April	AIK	Leksands IF	Asplöven HC; IF Sundsvall Hockey	2,514	Marcus Nilsson (BIK)
12 (18)	2016–17	14 September	3 March	1 April	Mora IK	Mora IK	Västerås IK	2,637	Victor Ejdsell (BIK)
13 (19)	2017–18	19 September	7 March	6 April	Timrå IK	Timrå IK	IF Troja/Ljungby	2,705	Emil Molin (Modo)
14 (20)	2018–19	21 September	8 March	8 April	Timrå IK	Leksands IF; IK Oskarshamn	IK Pantern	2,713	Nicolai Meyer (SSK)
15 (21)	2019–20	18 September	6 March	April	IF Björklöven			2,606	Jonathan Johnson (Modo)
