= Jörgen Wännström =

Swedish ice hockey player (born 1969)

- Born: January 29, 1969 (age 57) Skellefteå, Sweden
- Height: 5 ft 9 in (175 cm)
- Weight: 183 lb (83 kg; 13 st 1 lb)
- Position: Centre
- Shot: Left
- Played for: Clemensnäs IF; Lejonströms SK; Skellefteå AIK; Burträsk HC
- Playing career: 1989–2006

Jörgen Wännström (born January 29, 1969), is a retired ice hockey player who spent 12 seasons with Skellefteå AIK.

At the start of Jörgen's career he played 6 Elitserien games before Skellefteå was relegated to Allsvenskan in 1990. Wännström spent the last five seasons of his playing career with Burträsk HC in Division 2.

== Career statistics ==
			Regular season					Playoffs
Season	Team	League	GP	G	A	Pts	PIM	GP	G	A	Pts	PIM
1988–89	Clemensnäs IF	Division 1	32	21	7	28	24	—	—	—	—	—
1989–90	Lejonströms SK	Division 1	12	7	3	10	8	—	—	—	—	—
1989–90	Skellefteå HC	Elitserien	6	1	1	2	2	—	—	—	—	—
1990–91	Skellefteå HC	Division 1	29	6	9	15	8	—	—	—	—	—
1991–92	Skellefteå AIK	Division 1	28	15	16	31	8	3	0	2	2	0
1992–93	Skellefteå AIK	Division 1	32	22	13	35	12	5	1	2	3	0
1993–94	Skellefteå AIK	Division 1	31	21	18	39	14	8	4	2	6	4
1994–95	Skellefteå AIK	Division 1	31	12	14	26	8	5	3	1	4	2
1995–96	Skellefteå AIK	Division 1	32	11	17	28	16	—	—	—	—	—
1996–97	Skellefteå AIK	Division 1	27	10	12	22	6	3	2	1	3	0
1997–98	Skellefteå AIK	Division 1	30	14	16	30	12	4	0	2	2	2
1998–99	Skellefteå AIK	Division 1	31	9	6	15	12	5	2	1	3	6
1999–00	Skellefteå AIK	Allsvenskan	44	8	16	24	20	5	0	0	0	0
2000–01	Skellefteå AIK	Allsvenskan	39	12	13	25	47	2	0	0	0	0
2001–02	Burträsk HC	Division 2	—	—	—	—	—	—	—	—	—	—
2002–03	Burträsk HC	Division 2	—	—	—	—	—	—	—	—	—	—
2003–04	Burträsk HC	Division 2	—	—	—	—	—	—	—	—	—	—
2004–05	Burträsk HC	Division 2	12	8	12	20	12	—	—	—	—	—
2005–06	Burträsk HC	Division 2	—	—	—	—	—	—	—	—	—	—
2018–19	Burträsk HC	Division 2	1	0	0	0	4	—	—	—	—	—
Elitserien totals			6	1	1	2	2	—	—	—	—	—
Division 1 totals			315	148	131	279	128	33	12	11	23	14
