= Daniel Pettersson =

Swedish ice hockey player (born 1969)

- Born: June 19, 1969 (age 57) Piteå, Sweden
- Height: 5 ft 11 in (180 cm)
- Weight: 165 lb (75 kg; 11 st 11 lb)
- Position: Centre
- Shot: Left
- Played for: Skellefteå AIK
- Playing career: 1988–2001

Daniel Pettersson (born July 19, 1969) is a retired ice hockey player who spent 14 seasons with Skellefteå AIK and played 56 Elitserien games with them. His son, Marcus Pettersson, currently plays with the New York Rangers of the NHL.

== Career statistics ==
			Regular season					Playoffs
Season	Team	League	GP	G	A	Pts	PIM	GP	G	A	Pts	PIM
1984–85	Piteå IF J18	J18 Div.1	—	—	—	—	—	—	—	—	—	—
1985–86	Piteå IF J18	J18 Div.1	—	—	—	—	—	—	—	—	—	—
1986–87	Skellefteå HC J20	Juniorserien	—	—	—	—	—	—	—	—	—	—
1987–88	Skellefteå HC J20	Juniorserien	—	—	—	—	—	—	—	—	—	—
1987–88	Skellefteå HC	Elitserien	2	0	0	0	0	—	—	—	—	—
1988–89	Skellefteå HC	Elitserien	33	5	3	8	6	—	—	—	—	—
1989–90	Skellefteå HC	Elitserien	21	2	6	8	2	—	—	—	—	—
1990–91	Skellefteå HC	Division 1	20	6	10	16	4	—	—	—	—	—
1991–92	Skellefteå AIK	Division 1	29	9	15	24	10	3	0	0	0	2
1992–93	Skellefteå AIK	Division 1	32	8	26	34	12	5	1	2	3	2
1993–94	Skellefteå AIK	Division 1	28	15	16	31	16	8	4	2	6	4
1994–95	Skellefteå AIK	Division 1	32	9	13	22	28	5	1	2	3	0
1995–96	Skellefteå AIK	Division 1	31	12	22	34	4	—	—	—	—	—
1996–97	Skellefteå AIK	Division 1	29	11	17	28	10	6	1	6	7	2
1997–98	Skellefteå AIK	Division 1	5	2	4	6	11	4	2	1	3	2
1998–99	Skellefteå AIK	Division 1	26	7	15	22	10	—	—	—	—	—
1999–00	Skellefteå AIK	Allsvenskan	42	16	17	33	37	4	1	0	1	2
2000–01	Skellefteå AIK	Allsvenskan	40	5	12	17	22	2	0	0	0	4
Elitserien totals			56	7	9	16	8	—	—	—	—	—
Allsvenskan totals			82	21	29	50	59	6	1	0	1	6
Division 1 totals			232	79	138	217	105	31	9	13	22	12
