= Conny Strömberg =

Swedish ice hockey player

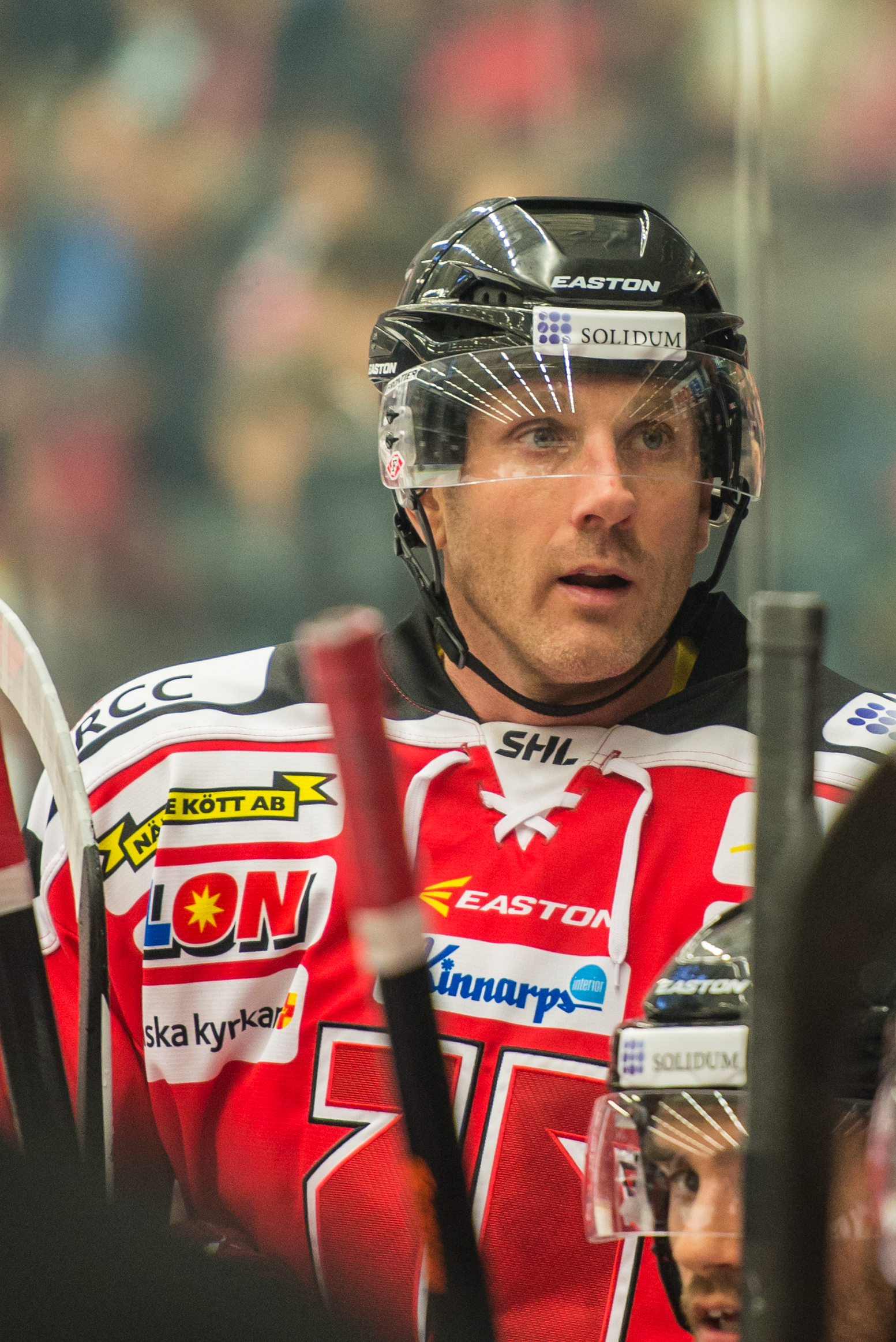
- Born: November 10, 1975 (age 50) Örnsköldsvik, Sweden
- Height: 5 ft 11 in (180 cm)
- Weight: 198 lb (90 kg; 14 st 2 lb)
- Position: Left wing
- Shot: Left
- Played for: Modo Hockey; Örebro HK
- Playing career: 1999–2020

Conny Strömberg (born November 10, 1975) is a Swedish former professional ice hockey left winger. He last played for Tegs SK Hockey of HockeyEttan.

Strömberg played in SHL with Modo and Örebro HK.

== Career statistics ==
			Regular season					Playoffs
Season	Team	League	GP	G	A	Pts	PIM	GP	G	A	Pts	PIM
1992–93	MoDo Hockey J18	J18 Div1	—	—	—	—	—	—	—	—	—	—
1992–93	MoDo Hockey J20	Juniorallsvenskan	5	0	0	0	2	—	—	—	—	—
1993–94	MoDo Hockey J20	Juniorallsvenskan	14	10	9	19	35	—	—	—	—	—
1994–95	IK Vita Hästen	Division 1	33	6	4	10	4	—	—	—	—	—
1995–96	Husums IF	Division 1	31	20	19	39	62	—	—	—	—	—
1996–97	IF Sundsvall Hockey	Division 1	14	2	4	6	4	—	—	—	—	—
1996–97	Husums IF	Division 1	13	2	2	4	22	—	—	—	—	—
1997–98	IFK Arboga IK	Division 1	11	6	5	11	20	—	—	—	—	—
1997–98	Husums IF	Division 1	17	10	9	19	62	—	—	—	—	—
1998–99	IFK Arboga IK	Division 1	41	26	30	56	36	—	—	—	—	—
1999–00	MoDo Hockey	Elitserien	25	1	1	2	2	—	—	—	—	—
1999–00	IFK Arboga IK	Allsvenskan	16	10	8	18	18	—	—	—	—	—
2000–01	Tierps HK	Allsvenskan	38	15	24	39	91	—	—	—	—	—
2001–02	Herlev Eagles	Denmark	30	25	39	64	71	6	1	1	2	29
2002–03	Blue Devils Weiden	Germany3	53	48	78	126	94	7	0	11	11	12
2003–04	Blue Devils Weiden	Germany2	41	29	36	65	89	—	—	—	—	—
2004–05	Graz 99ers	EBEL	36	16	33	49	22	—	—	—	—	—
2004–05	IFK Arboga IK	Allsvenskan	7	3	5	8	2	8	4	7	11	8
2005–06	Landshut Cannibals	Germany2	52	23	47	70	50	7	1	8	9	2
2006–07	Moskitos Essen	Germany2	42	12	51	63	54	3	0	2	2	4
2007–08	Vaasan Sport	Mestis	5	2	3	5	2	—	—	—	—	—
2007–08	HK Jesenice	EBEL	37	21	19	40	24	4	3	1	4	16
2007–08	HK Jesenice	Slovenia	—	—	—	—	—	8	4	6	10	28
2008–09	HK Jesenice	EBEL	53	17	37	54	34	5	1	1	2	2
2008–09	HK Jesenice	Slovenia	—	—	—	—	—	6	4	5	9	2
2009–10	Örebro HK	HockeyAllsvenskan	51	18	46	64	73	—	—	—	—	—
2010–11	Örebro HK	HockeyAllsvenskan	44	12	46	58	52	10	1	7	8	38
2010–11	Asplöven HC	Division 1	3	0	4	4	2	—	—	—	—	—
2011–12	Örebro HK	HockeyAllsvenskan	51	9	48	57	12	5	1	2	3	4
2012–13	Asplöven HC	HockeyAllsvenskan	17	3	11	14	29	—	—	—	—	—
2012–13	Västerviks IK	HockeyEttan	1	0	1	1	0	—	—	—	—	—
2012–13	Tingsryds AIF	HockeyAllsvenskan	16	0	11	11	6	—	—	—	—	—
2012–13	Örebro HK	HockeyAllsvenskan	16	4	10	14	8	16	3	18	21	2
2013–14	Örebro HK	SHL	47	4	9	13	8	—	—	—	—	—
2014–15	VIK Västerås HK	HockeyAllsvenskan	31	4	18	22	24	—	—	—	—	—
2014–15	AIK IF	HockeyAllsvenskan	17	1	10	11	6	5	0	4	4	2
2015–16	Herlev Eagles	Denmark	25	5	24	29	24	—	—	—	—	—
2015–16	Sheffield Steelers	EIHL	20	4	10	14	18	2	0	1	1	0
2016–17	Västerviks IK	HockeyAllsvenskan	38	7	20	27	28	—	—	—	—	—
2017–18	Lørenskog IK	Norway	15	1	12	13	8	—	—	—	—	—
2017–18	Västerviks IK	HockeyAllsvenskan	23	0	10	10	14	—	—	—	—	—
2017–18	VIK Västerås HK	HockeyEttan	3	1	0	1	4	13	4	9	13	12
2018–19	IFK Arboga IK	HockeyEttan	11	1	13	14	12	—	—	—	—	—
2018–19	Örnsköldsvik HF	HockeyEttan	14	6	20	26	12	—	—	—	—	—
2018–19	Hudiksvalls HC	HockeyEttan	4	0	5	5	2	—	—	—	—	—
2019–20	Surahammars IF	HockeyEttan	31	4	23	27	88	—	—	—	—	—
2019–20	Tegs SK Hockey	HockeyEttan	7	1	3	4	4	—	—	—	—	—
2021–22	Brödernas Hockey	Division 4	1	1	0	1	0	—	—	—	—	—
2022–23	Vännäs HC	HockeyEttan	1	0	1	1	0	—	—	—	—	—
SHL (Elitserien) totals			72	5	10	15	10	—	—	—	—	—
Allsvenskan totals			61	28	37	65	111	8	4	7	11	8
HockeyAllsvenskan totals			304	58	230	288	252	36	5	31	36	46
Germany2 totals			135	64	134	198	193	10	1	10	11	6
EBEL totals			126	54	89	143	80	9	4	2	6	18
Division 1 totals			160	72	73	145	210	—	—	—	—	—
HockeyEttan totals			75	13	70	83	124	13	4	9	13	12
