= Andreas Pihl =

Swedish ice hockey player

- Born: February 25, 1973 (age 52); Uppsala, SWE
- Height: 6 ft 4 in (193 cm)
- Weight: 231 lb (105 kg; 16 st 7 lb)
- Position: Defence
- Shot: Left
- SEL team Former teams: Linköpings HC; Almtuna IS; Mora; Modo Hockey; Red Bull Salzburg EC
- Playing career: 1999–2011

Andreas Pihl (born February 25, 1973, in Uppsala, Sweden) is a Swedish retired professional ice hockey defenceman.

== Playing career ==
Pihl began his career in 92/93, playing for Almtuna IS in his hometown of Uppsala. He stayed there for five seasons and then made a two-season-stint in Mora. Thereafter he made his debut in Elitserien with Modo Hockey.

After three years in Örnsköldsvik he joined the club Linköpings HC (LHC). He spent four seasons in LHC before leaving for play in Red Bull Salzburg EC in the Austrian Hockey League, however this lasted for only one, though highly successful, season. He decided to return to Linköping for the season of 07/08. On July 7, 2011, Pihl officially retired as a player.

== Career statistics ==
			Regular season					Playoffs
Season	Team	League	GP	G	A	Pts	PIM	GP	G	A	Pts	PIM
1992–93	Uppsala AIS	Division 1	28	2	2	4	22	—	—	—	—	—
1993–94	Uppsala AIS	Division 1	24	2	0	2	34	3	1	0	1	0
1994–95	Uppsala AIS	Division 1	28	0	5	5	63	—	—	—	—	—
1995–96	Uppsala AIS	Division 1	31	5	7	12	36	—	—	—	—	—
1996–97	Uppsala AIS	Division 1	32	12	11	23	129	2	0	1	1	2
1997–98	Mora IK	Division 1	17	1	4	5	68	4	1	0	1	4
1998–99	Mora IK J20	J20 SuperElit	1	0	0	0	0	—	—	—	—	—
1998–99	Mora IK	Division 1	33	6	10	16	46	14	4	0	4	22
1999–00	Modo Hockey	Elitserien	50	5	7	12	76	13	2	5	7	16
2000–01	Modo Hockey	Elitserien	48	1	4	5	88	6	2	0	2	45
2001–02	Modo Hockey	Elitserien	50	5	5	10	113	14	2	4	6	20
2002–03	Linköping HC	Elitserien	48	2	1	3	56	—	—	—	—	—
2003–04	Linköping HC	Elitserien	50	4	2	6	64	5	0	0	0	8
2004–05	Linköping HC	Elitserien	47	3	6	9	81	6	1	0	1	8
2005–06	Linköping HC	Elitserien	46	1	7	8	146	13	2	1	3	49
2006–07	EC Salzburg	EBEL	47	6	12	18	96	—	—	—	—	—
2007–08	Linköping HC	Elitserien	49	3	7	10	98	9	3	1	4	39
2008–09	Linköping HC	Elitserien	49	5	8	13	108	7	0	0	0	12
2009–10	Linköping HC	Elitserien	42	1	4	5	42	12	1	0	1	32
2010–11	Linköping HC	Elitserien	46	2	1	3	53	7	0	0	0	12
Elitserien totals			525	32	52	84	925	92	12	9	21	241
Division 1 totals			193	28	39	67	398	23	6	1	7	28
