= Björn Danielsson =

Swedish ice hockey player

- Born: August 14, 1977 (age 48) Märsta, SWE
- Height: 5 ft 9 in (175 cm)
- Weight: 176 lb (80 kg; 12 st 8 lb)
- Position: Centre
- Shot: Left
- Played for: Arlanda HC; AIK; Brynäs IF; Team Gävle; Strömsbro IF
- Playing career: 1994–2014

Björn Danielsson (born August 14, 1977) is a retired Swedish professional ice hockey player currently assistant coach in IF Sundsvall Hockey team in the Swedish HockeyAllsvenskan league.

== Career statistics ==
| | | | Regular season | | | | | Playoffs |
| Season | Team | League | GP | G | A | Pts | PIM | GP | G | A | Pts | PIM |
|---|---|---|---|---|---|---|---|---|---|---|---|---|
| 1994–95 | Arlanda HC | Division 1 | 30 | 3 | 5 | 8 | 10 | — | — | — | — | — |
| 1995–96 | Arlanda HC | Division 1 | 31 | 5 | 6 | 11 | 16 | 4 | 0 | 0 | 0 | 0 |
| 1996–97 | Arlanda HC | Division 1 | 32 | 16 | 10 | 26 | 10 | — | — | — | — | — |
| 1997–98 | Arlanda HC | Division 1 | 32 | 11 | 20 | 31 | 26 | 2 | 3 | 2 | 5 | 0 |
| 1998–99 | Arlanda HC | Division 1 | 33 | 20 | 24 | 44 | 22 | — | — | — | — | — |
| 1999–00 | Arlanda HC | Allsvenskan | 46 | 23 | 26 | 49 | 28 | — | — | — | — | — |
| 2000–01 | AIK IF | Elitserien | 47 | 11 | 14 | 25 | 20 | 5 | 0 | 2 | 2 | 2 |
| 2001–02 | Brynäs IF | Elitserien | 49 | 6 | 12 | 18 | 16 | 4 | 0 | 1 | 1 | 4 |
| 2002–03 | Brynäs IF | Elitserien | 40 | 3 | 6 | 9 | 18 | — | — | — | — | — |
| 2003–04 | Brynäs IF | Elitserien | 50 | 15 | 9 | 24 | 46 | — | — | — | — | — |
| 2004–05 | Brynäs IF | Elitserien | 44 | 7 | 13 | 20 | 20 | — | — | — | — | — |
| 2005–06 | Brynäs IF J20 | J20 SuperElit | 1 | 0 | 0 | 0 | 0 | — | — | — | — | — |
| 2005–06 | Brynäs IF | Elitserien | 39 | 7 | 9 | 16 | 12 | 4 | 1 | 0 | 1 | 0 |
| 2006–07 | Brynäs IF | Elitserien | 54 | 7 | 17 | 24 | 46 | 7 | 0 | 2 | 2 | 0 |
| 2007–08 | Brynäs IF | Elitserien | 47 | 3 | 13 | 16 | 45 | — | — | — | — | — |
| 2008–09 | Brynäs IF | Elitserien | 9 | 0 | 1 | 1 | 10 | — | — | — | — | — |
| 2009–10 | Team Gävle | Division 2 | 2 | 1 | 4 | 5 | 0 | — | — | — | — | — |
| 2011–12 | Team Gävle | Division 2 | 1 | 0 | 1 | 1 | 6 | 3 | 0 | 4 | 4 | 2 |
| 2013–14 | Strömsbro IF | Division 3 | 1 | 0 | 0 | 0 | 0 | — | — | — | — | — |
| Elitserien totals | | | 379 | 59 | 94 | 153 | 233 | 20 | 1 | 5 | 6 | 6 |
| Division 1 totals | | | 158 | 55 | 65 | 120 | 84 | 6 | 3 | 2 | 5 | 0 |
