= 2001–02 Allsvenskan (ice hockey) season =

Swedish ice hockey season

The 2001–02 Allsvenskan season was the third season of the Allsvenskan, the second level of ice hockey in Sweden. 24 teams participated in the league, and Leksands IF, Bodens IK, Bofors IK, and IF Björklöven qualified for the Kvalserien.

== Regular season ==
=== Northern Group ===
	Club	GP	W	OTW	OTL	L	GF	GA	Pts
1.	IF Björklöven	32	26	1	1	4	154	73	81
2.	Nyköpings Hockey 90	32	25	0	2	5	159	76	77
3.	Skellefteå AIK	32	17	5	2	8	125	86	63
4.	Bodens IK	32	17	2	4	9	117	91	59
5.	Hammarby IF	32	16	1	3	12	106	89	53
6.	Piteå HC	32	12	3	4	13	117	116	46
7.	IF Sundsvall Hockey	32	13	1	2	16	96	97	43
8.	IFK Arboga IK	32	10	4	2	16	90	110	40
9.	Huddinge IK	32	11	2	0	19	96	128	37
10.	Almtuna IS	32	6	3	4	19	84	126	28
11.	Tierps HK	32	7	2	2	21	63	134	27
12.	Kiruna IF	32	5	2	2	23	60	141	22

=== Southern Group ===
	Club	GP	W	OTW	OTL	L	GF	GA	Pts
1.	Leksands IF	32	30	0	1	1	176	68	91
2.	Rögle BK	32	20	1	0	11	106	87	62
3.	Tingsryds AIF	32	18	0	4	10	119	94	58
4.	Bofors IK	32	17	2	3	6	117	78	58
5.	IF Troja-Ljungby	32	16	2	0	14	109	109	52
6.	Mora IK	32	15	1	2	14	110	92	49
7.	Halmstad Hammers HC	32	12	3	1	16	86	105	43
8.	Mörrums GoIS IK	32	11	3	0	18	109	124	39
9.	Tranås AIF	32	11	1	2	18	106	129	37
10.	IK Oskarshamn	32	9	3	0	20	87	121	33
11.	Gislaveds SK	32	9	0	4	19	93	133	31
12.	HC Örebro 90	32	5	4	0	23	92	152	23

== SuperAllsvenskan ==
	Club	GP	W	OTW	OTL	L	GF	GA	Pts
1.	Leksands IF	14	12	1	0	1	81	33	38
2.	Bodens IK	14	6	2	1	5	47	55	23
3.	Bofors IK	14	6	1	2	5	47	48	22
4.	Tingsryds AIF	14	6	1	0	7	51	58	20
5.	IF Björklöven	14	5	1	1	7	51	49	18
6.	Skellefteå AIK	14	4	2	2	6	48	53	18
7.	Rögle BK	14	4	1	1	8	44	55	15
8.	Nyköpings Hockey 90	14	4	0	2	8	39	57	14

== Qualification round ==
=== Northern Group ===
	Club	GP	W	OTW	OTL	L	GF	GA	Pts (Bonus)
1.	Hammarby IF	14	10	0	1	3	49	29	38(7)
2.	IFK Arboga IK	14	8	2	0	4	46	36	32(4)
3.	Piteå HC	14	5	1	4	4	47	47	27(6)
4.	Huddinge IK	14	5	3	1	5	42	37	25(3)
5.	IF Sundsvall Hockey	14	5	1	0	8	42	40	22(5)
6.	Kiruna IF	14	4	3	0	7	35	38	18(0)
7.	Almtuna IS	14	4	0	3	7	36	48	17(2)
8.	Tierps HK	14	5	0	1	8	32	54	17(1)

=== Southern Group ===
	Club	GP	W	OTW	OTL	L	GF	GA	Pts (Bonus)
1.	Mora IK	14	8	3	0	3	46	28	36(6)
2.	IF Troja-Ljungby	14	8	0	2	4	48	40	33(7)
3.	Tranås AIF	14	7	1	2	4	52	49	28(3)
4.	HC Örebro 90	14	7	2	0	5	50	48	25(0)
5.	IK Oskarshamn	14	6	0	4	4	42	48	24(2)
6.	Halmstad Hammers HC	14	5	1	0	8	45	41	22(5)
7.	Gislaveds SK	14	4	1	0	9	47	56	15(1)
8.	Mörrums GoIS IK	14	2	1	1	10	41	61	13(4)

== Playoffs ==
=== First round ===
- Mora IK - Skellefteå AIK 1:2 (4:1, 3:4 OT, 1:2)
- IFK Arboga IK - Bofors IK 1:2 (3:2 OT, 2:4, 2:5)
- IF Troja-Ljungby - Tingsryds AIF 2:0 (4:2, 4:3)
- Hammarby IF - IF Björklöven 0:2 (5:6 OT, 4:5)

=== Second round ===
- IF Troja-Ljungby - Bofors IK 1:2 (2:1 OT, 1:3, 2:3 OT)
- Skellefteå AIK - IF Björklöven 1:2 (5:3, 1:5, 3:4 OT)

== Relegation round ==
=== Northern Group ===
	Club	GP	W	OTW	OTL	L	GF	GA	Pts
1.	Vallentuna BK	10	7	0	0	3	39	29	21
2.	Örnsköldsviks SK	10	5	2	1	2	48	31	20
3.	Botkyrka HC	10	6	0	2	2	43	34	20
4.	Almtuna IS	10	4	1	0	5	31	28	14
5.	Tierps HK	10	3	0	1	6	25	41	10
6.	Tegs SK	10	1	1	0	8	29	52	5

=== Southern Group ===
	Club	GP	W	OTW	OTL	L	GF	GA	Pts
1.	Nybro IF	10	5	2	0	3	40	29	19
2.	Mörrums GoIS IK	10	6	0	0	4	43	31	18
3.	Västerås IK	10	5	0	1	4	31	23	16
4.	Växjö HC	10	4	0	1	5	33	36	13
5.	Sunne IK	10	4	0	1	5	39	52	13
6.	Gislaveds SK	10	3	1	0	6	31	46	11
