= Mikael Samuelsson =

Swedish ice hockey player (born 1976)

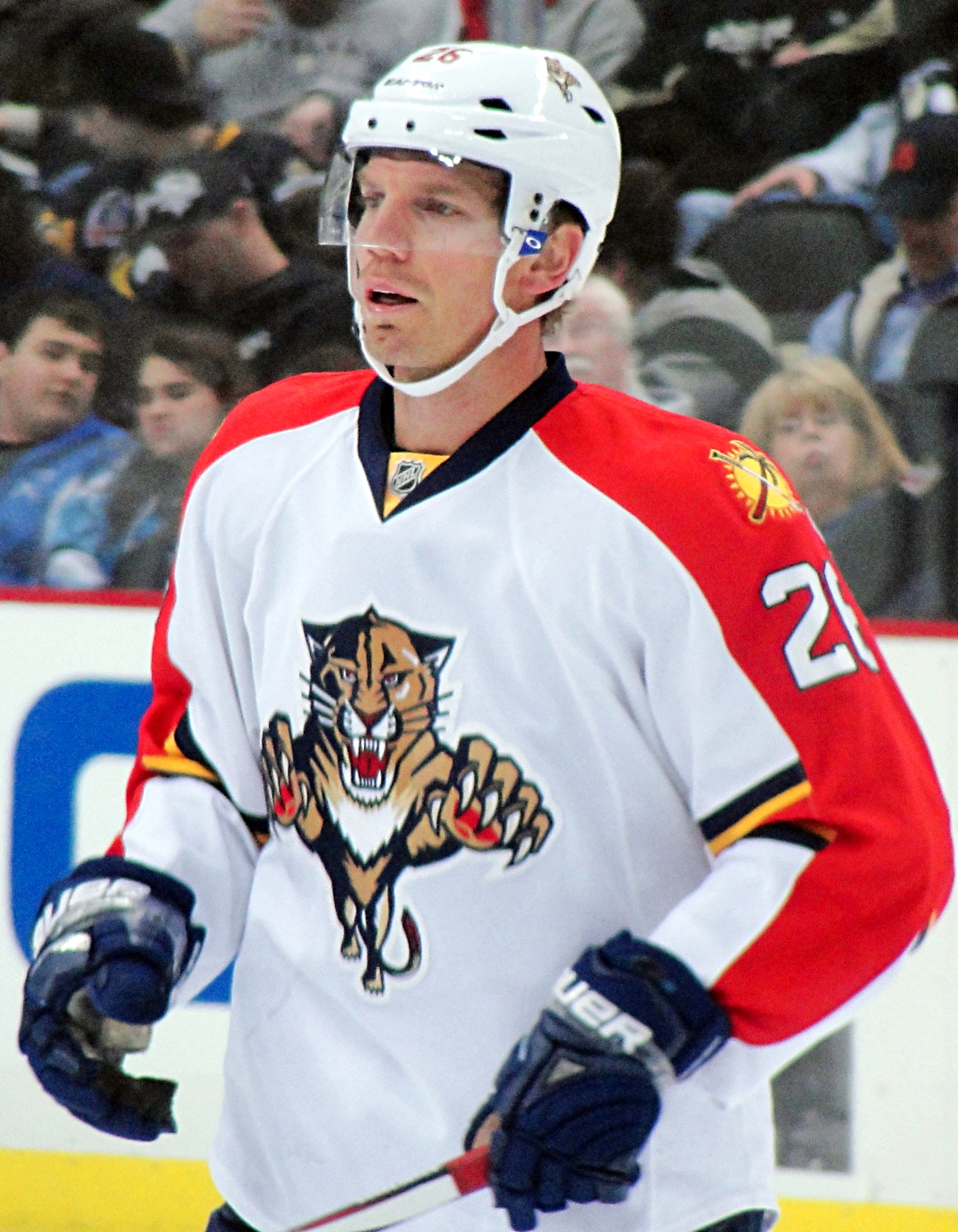
- Samuelsson with the Florida Panthers in March 2012
- Born: 23 December 1976 (age 49) Mariefred, Sweden
- Height: 6 ft 2 in (188 cm)
- Weight: 218 lb (99 kg; 15 st 8 lb)
- Position: Right wing
- Shot: Right
- Played for: NHL; San Jose Sharks; New York Rangers; Florida Panthers; Pittsburgh Penguins; Detroit Red Wings; Vancouver Canucks; Swiss-A; Genève-Servette HC; Rapperswil-Jona Lakers; SHL; Brynäs IF; Djurgårdens IF; Frölunda HC; Södertälje SK
- National team: Sweden
- NHL draft: 145th overall, 1998; San Jose Sharks
- Playing career: 1996–2015

Karl Mikael Samuelsson (born 23 December 1976) is a Swedish former professional ice hockey player and current player development coach for the Vancouver Canucks of the National Hockey League (NHL).

A right winger, Samuelsson began his career in Sweden, starting with small-town team IFK Mariefred, followed by Södertälje SK as a junior in 1994. He went on to also play for Swedish teams IK Nyköping, Frölunda HC, and Brynäs IF. After being selected 145th overall in the 1998 NHL entry draft by the San Jose Sharks, he moved to North America for the 2000–01 NHL season. Samuelsson spent short stints with the Sharks, New York Rangers, Pittsburgh Penguins, and Florida Panthers, before returning to Europe during the 2004–05 NHL lockout. As NHL play resumed, Samuelsson signed with the Detroit Red Wings, where he enjoyed individual and team success, winning the Stanley Cup with the club in 2008. After four seasons in Detroit, he signed with the Vancouver Canucks in July 2009. He enjoyed the two most successful individual seasons of his career with Vancouver, recording back-to-back 50-point campaigns in 2009–10 and 2010–11. In his third year with the club, he was traded to the Panthers for his second stint in Florida. At the end of the season, he re-signed with the Red Wings in July 2012. Internationally, Samuelsson is a member of the Triple Gold Club. In addition to his Stanley Cup championship, he has won gold medals with the Swedish national team at the 2006 Winter Olympics and 2006 World Championships.

== Playing career ==
=== Swedish career (1994–2000) ===
After playing for IFK Mariefred during his childhood, Samuelsson played junior with Södertälje SK of the J20 SuperElit, beginning in 1994–95. Scoring at a point-per-game pace at the junior level the following season, he was called up to the club's professional club, scoring five goals and an assist in 18 games. He helped Södertälje SK earn a promotion from the second-tier HockeyAllsvenskan to Sweden's premier league, the Elitserien, for the 1996–97 campaign. Debuting in the Elitserien, Samuelsson recorded six points over 29 games. While improving to 16 points in 31 games the following season, he also played in ten games for IK Nyköping in the Allsvenskan. During the subsequent off-season, Samuelsson was selected in the fifth round, 145th overall, by the San Jose Sharks in the 1998 NHL entry draft.

Upon being drafted, he remained in Sweden for two more seasons. As Södertälje SK was demoted back to the Allsvenskan for the 1998–99 season, Samuelsson remained in the Elitserien by joining Frölunda HC, playing with both teams over the course of the season. While scoring 23 points over 18 games with Södertälje, he managed five points over 27 games with Frölunda. The following season, 1999–2000, Samuelsson transferred to Brynäs IF of the Elitserien and recorded seven points in 40 games. He helped the club to the second-best record in the regular season, before losing in the semifinals to Modo Hockey. He ranked second in team-scoring with nine points in 11 post-season games.

=== Early NHL career (2000–2005) ===
Samuelsson moved to North America in 2000–01 to begin playing within the San Jose Sharks organization. He was assigned to the club's American Hockey League (AHL) affiliate, the Kentucky Thoroughblades, out of training camp, where he spent the majority of the season. He had 32 goals and 78 points over 66 games in the AHL to finish seventh in League scoring. Called up to the Sharks on two occasions over the course of the season, he appeared in his first four NHL games, recording no points.

In the subsequent off-season, Samuelsson was traded to the New York Rangers, along with fellow prospect Christian Gosselin, in exchange for veteran forward Adam Graves on June 24, 2001. He began the 2001–02 season with the Rangers' AHL affiliate, the Hartford Wolf Pack, but after notching nine points in eight games, he was recalled to the NHL on November 5. He scored his first two NHL goals on November 20 against goaltender Patrick Roy in a 5–3 win against the Colorado Avalanche. Samuelsson's first goal came short-handed and broke Roy's three-game shutout streak, which was in contention to tie the modern-day NHL record at the time of four games. Samuelsson remained with the Rangers for the rest of the season and recorded six goals and 16 assists over 67 games as an NHL rookie. He was utilized in primarily defensive roles during his time in New York, playing on the penalty kill and matching up against opposing teams' top offensive lines.

In the off-season, Samuelsson was re-signed by the Rangers and made the club's opening roster for the 2002–03 campaign. Late in the season, he was dealt to the Pittsburgh Penguins in an eight-player trade on February 10, 2003. Along with Samuelsson, the Rangers sent Rico Fata, Joël Bouchard, Richard Lintner and cash to the Penguins in exchange for Alexei Kovalev, Dan LaCouture, Janne Laukkanen and Mike Wilson. Samuelsson scored two goals in 22 games with the Penguins to finish his second NHL season with a combined 10 goals and 24 points between Pittsburgh and New York. Looking to move up in the 2003 NHL entry draft, the Penguins traded him on draft-day, along with their first- and second-round picks (used to select Nathan Horton and Stefan Meyer, respectively), to the Florida Panthers in exchange for the first overall selection that year (used to pick goaltender Marc-André Fleury) and a third-round pick (Daniel Carcillo) on June 21, 2003.

Samuelsson spent most of his time with the Panthers on the injured reserve list, beginning with a fractured jaw after receiving a high-stick from Branislav Mezei on November 22, 2003. He did not return until January 2004, missing 22 games. That same month, Samuelsson fractured his hand, missing another 21 games. After finishing the campaign with nine points in 37 games, he was not tendered a qualifying offer by the Panthers and subsequently became a free agent.

As it became apparent that the following NHL season would be suspended due to a lockout, Samuelsson initially signed with Genève-Servette HC of the Swiss National League A in September 2004. He appeared in 12 games for the club, recording six points. A month after signing in Switzerland, he returned to Södertälje SK of the Elitserien in late October. He recorded 20 points over 29 games as the club qualified for the eighth and final playoff spot, where they were defeated by Färjestad BK in four-straight games. Samuelsson notched six points in ten post-season games.

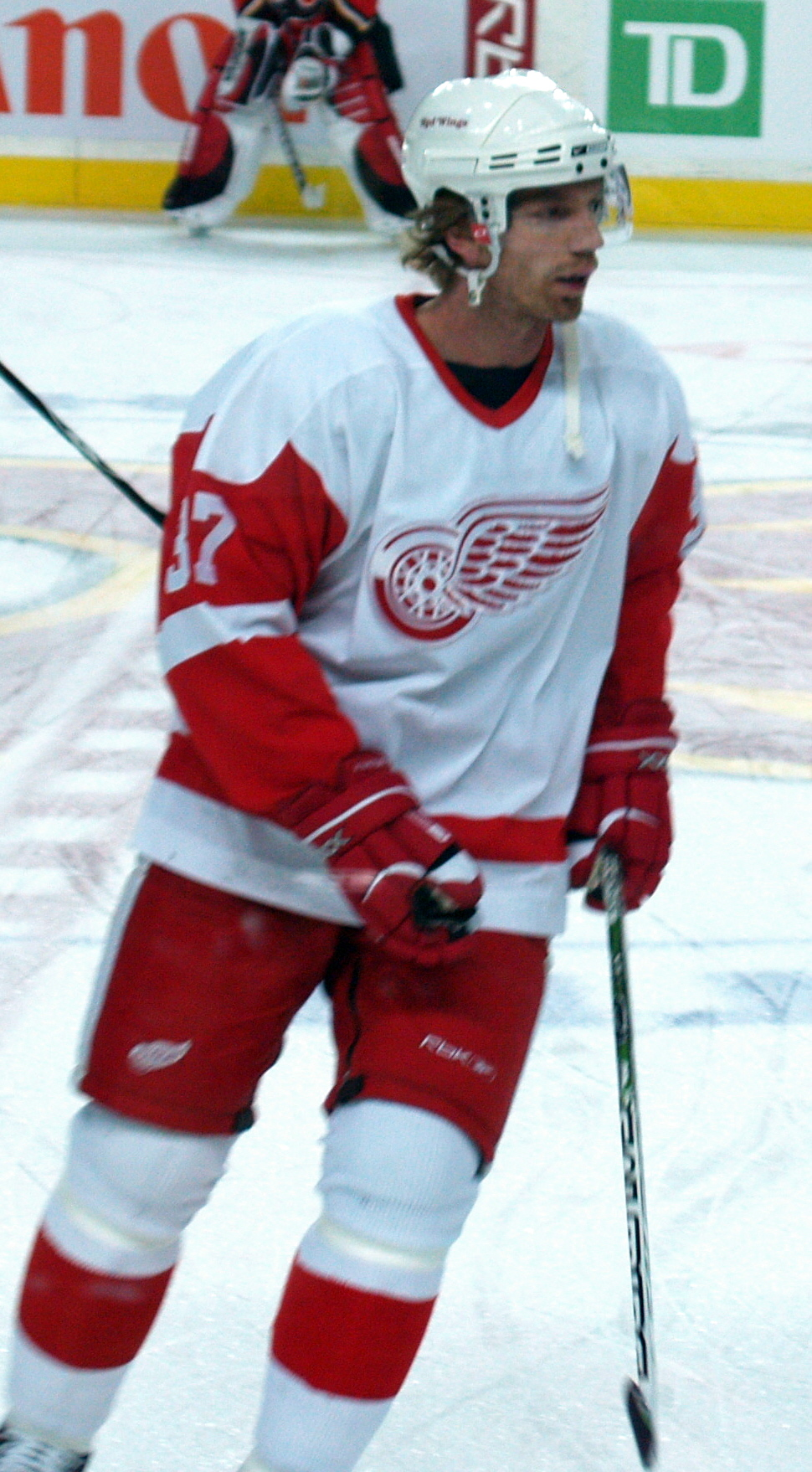
Samuelsson with the Red Wings in November 2006

=== Detroit Red Wings (2005–2009) ===
With NHL play set to resume following the lockout, Samuelsson was contacted by Håkan Andersson, director of European scouting for the Detroit Red Wings, in the summer of 2005. Still in Europe, he was loaned from Södertälje SK to the Swiss Rapperswil-Jona Lakers for two games in early-September. Samuelsson competed in one game for the Lakers before signing a one-year contract with the Red Wings. Joining Detroit marked a turning point in his career. Playing mainly on the third line, he was used on the power play and emerged as a legitimate offensive player in the NHL. During his first season with the Red Wings, he recorded 23 goals, 22 assists and 45 points in 71 games. He missed nine games late in the campaign due to a wrist injury, but returned for the playoffs. Seeded first overall in the Western Conference, Detroit was eliminated in the opening round by the Edmonton Oilers. Samuelsson notched an assist while appearing in the first six NHL playoff games of his career.

In March 2006, Samuelsson signed a three-year contract extension with the Red Wings. He recorded 34 points in 53 games the following season, while missing 18 games to a broken right foot. Finishing first overall in the West once more, Detroit advanced to the Conference Final, where they were eliminated by the Anaheim Ducks. Samuelsson contributed 11 points in 18 post-season games.

After a 40-point campaign in 2007–08, Samuelsson helped the Red Wings to a Stanley Cup championship. He recorded 13 points in 22 post-season games, including the first two goals in game one of the Stanley Cup Final against the Pittsburgh Penguins. Helping the Red Wings defeat the Penguins in six games, the victory made Samuelsson a member of the Triple Gold Club, having won gold medals at the Winter Olympics and World Championships two years prior. Also accomplishing the feat were teammates and fellow Swedes Henrik Zetterberg and Niklas Kronwall.

The following season, Samuelsson recorded a second consecutive 40-point campaign. In the ensuing playoffs, he scored the overtime-winning goal in game two of the Semifinals against the Chicago Blackhawks. He advanced with the Red Wings to the 2009 Stanley Cup Final, where they met the Penguins for the second consecutive year despite initially building a 3–2 series lead. Detroit was defeated in seven games, missing out on back-to-back championships. Samuelsson contributed 10 points in 21 playoff games.

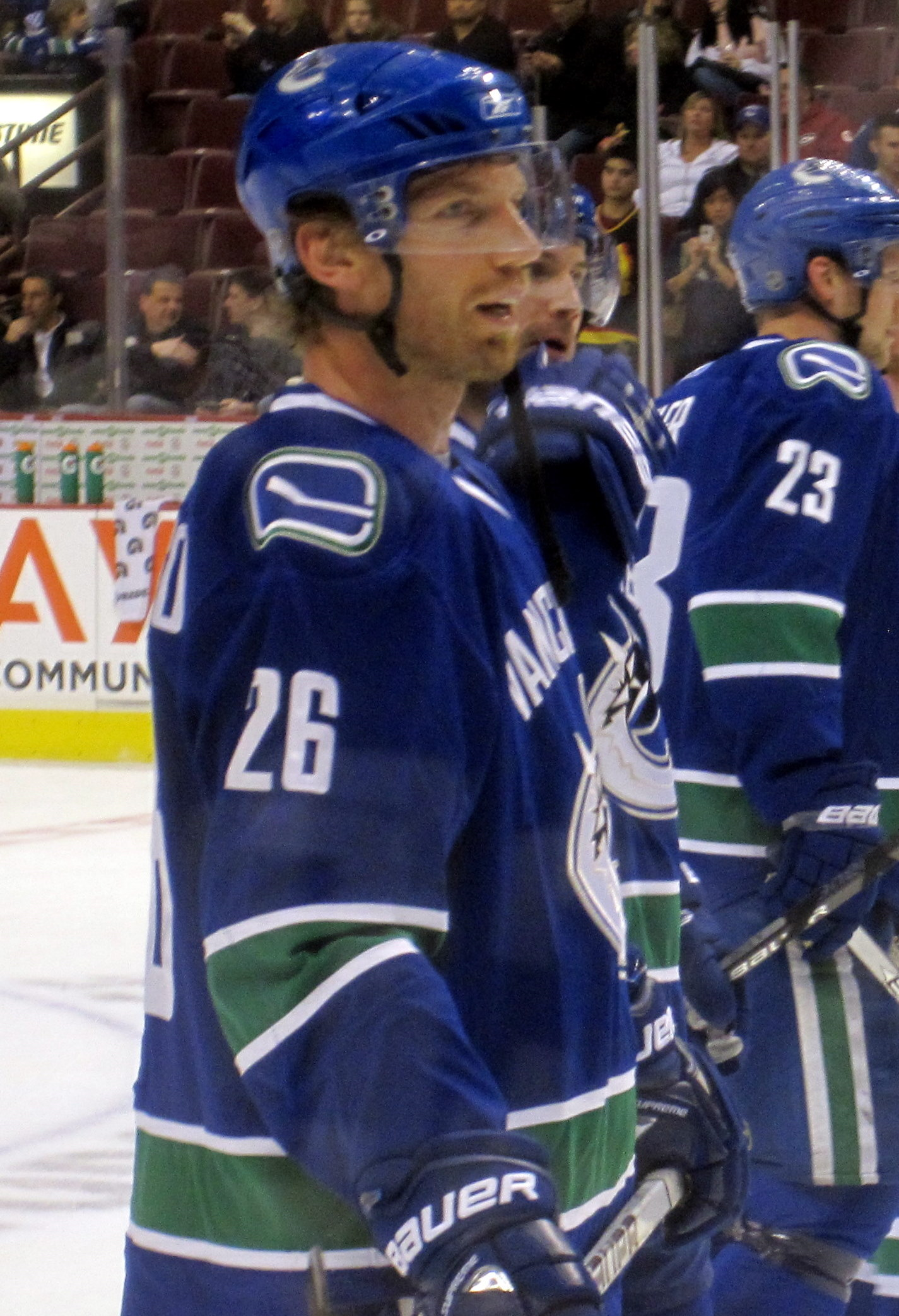
Samuelsson with the Canucks in March 2010

=== Vancouver Canucks (2009–2011) ===
Becoming an unrestricted free agent in the 2009 off-season, Samuelsson signed a three-year deal with the Vancouver Canucks on July 3, 2009, worth an annual average value of $2.5 million. He signed with the Canucks anticipating an expanded offensive role with more ice time, while also commenting that Detroit's efforts to re-sign him "came up too short, too late."

He scored his first goal as a Canuck in the 2009–10 season opener against the Calgary Flames in a 5–3 loss on October 1. On March 9, 2010, Samuelsson scored his first career hat trick in a 6–4 win against the Colorado Avalanche. All three goals were scored in the second period and assisted by countryman Henrik Sedin. He later earned NHL First Star of the Week honours on March 15 for notching six goals and four assists in four games. The following day, Samuelsson injured his shoulder in a game against the New York Islanders. He missed eight games, returning in time for the 2010 playoffs. He reached the 30-goal plateau for the first time in his career and added 23 assists for a career-high 53 points. Then-Head Coach Alain Vigneault played Samuelsson primarily on the second line with Ryan Kesler and Mason Raymond, while he also earned time on the top unit of Henrik and Daniel Sedin at times. Facing the Los Angeles Kings in the opening round of the 2010 playoffs, Samuelsson tied two Canucks playoff records. With seven goals in six games, he tied Pavel Bure for most goals in a series and with goals in the first five games of the series, he tied Cliff Ronning for longest goal-scoring streak. The Canucks advanced to the second round, where they were defeated by the Chicago Blackhawks in six games for the second consecutive year. Samuelsson finished the post-season with eight goals and 15 points in 12 games to lead the Canucks in scoring.

Samuelsson suffered a mild concussion after colliding with St. Louis Blues forward Vladimír Sobotka on December 5, 2010, causing him to miss one game. Two months later, he was named the NHL's Second Star for the week ending February 6, 2011. He scored two goals and six points in three Canucks victories to earn the distinction. While his goals total decreased to 18 in 2010–11, Samuelsson recorded his second consecutive 50-point campaign with a career-high 32 assists. Ranking fourth in team point-scoring behind the Sedins and Kesler, he helped the Canucks to the franchise's first Presidents' Trophy as the team with the NHL's best regular season record. Samuelsson struggled in the 2011 playoffs, as he returned from a lower-body injury that kept him from the six games near the end of the regular season. Recording three points over 11 games against the Blackhawks and Nashville Predators in the first two rounds, he was demoted at one point to the Canucks' fourth line in the second round against Nashville; it was suspected he was playing through an injury. In game three of the second round against Nashville, he fell to the ice while stretching to retrieve a loose puck and needed to be helped off the ice. Twelve days later, on May 19, he underwent surgery for his adductor tendon and a sports hernia, sidelining him for the remainder of the playoffs. With Samuelsson out of the lineup, Vancouver advanced to the 2011 Stanley Cup Final, where they were defeated in seven games by the Boston Bruins, despite initially holding a 3–2 series lead.

=== Returns to Florida and Detroit (2011–2014) ===
Recovering in time for the start of the 2011–12 season, Samuelsson played six games for Vancouver before being traded away on October 22, 2011. He was sent back to Florida for his second stint with the Panthers, along with fellow veteran forward Marco Sturm, in exchange for forwards David Booth and Steven Reinprecht, as well as a third-round draft pick in 2013. In an interview with HockeySverige.se at the end of the season, he told Swedish reporters that while he enjoyed playing in Vancouver, competing alongside countrymen Alexander Edler and the Sedins in particular, he "didn't think very highly of management." He also criticized Alexandre Burrows for his actions during game one of the Finals, when he bit Patrice Bergeron's finger after the Bruins forward had put it in his mouth, citing it a rallying point for the Bruins in their defeat of the Canucks. Samuelsson did not make his Panthers debut until December 8, 2011, missing the team's first 20 games following the trade due to groin complications that had not fully healed in the off-season. In his first month with the team, he suffered another lower-body injury after being checked by Phoenix Coyotes forward Shane Doan during a game on December 20; he missed five games. Upon returning, he scored his first goal as a Panther since the 2003–04 season on January 6, 2012, in a 5–2 loss to the New Jersey Devils. Samuelsson finished the campaign with 14 goals and 31 points over 54 games, split between Vancouver and Florida. His points-per-game ranked fifth on the Panthers.

Becoming an unrestricted free agent in the off-season, Samuelsson signed a two-year, $6 million deal to return to the Detroit Red Wings on July 1, 2012. The deal included a full no-trade clause.

=== Djurgårdens IF (2014–2015) ===
After two injury plagued seasons with the Red Wings, Samuelsson agreed to a one-year contract with Djurgårdens IF of the Swedish Hockey League (SHL) on July 29, 2014. Samuelsson's season in Djurgården began with the premiere season of the European Champions Hockey League. In the three group stage games he participated in, Samuelsson scored two goals and three points. He scored his first goal for Djurgården in the sixth round of the SHL regular season, a 4–5 loss against Örebro HK. He then injured his knee on October 16 and was out of play until October 28. Samuelsson was again out of the lineup between January 10 and February 19 due to a groin injury, missing 11 games. At the end of the SHL regular season, Samuelsson had scored 13 goals and 26 points in 37 games. He announced his retirement from professional hockey on March 26, 2015.

== International play ==
Medal record

Representing Sweden

Ice hockey

Olympic Games
Gold medal – first place	2006 Turin	

World Championship
Gold medal – first place	2006 Latvia	

Samuelsson debuted for the Swedish national team at the 2005 World Championships in Austria. He recorded five points in nine games as Sweden finished in fourth place, losing the bronze medal game to Russia. The following year, he competed in the 2006 Winter Olympics in Turin. He contributed four points in eight games, while playing on a line with future Canucks teammates Henrik and Daniel Sedin. Samuelsson recorded an assist against Finland in the final, helping Sweden win gold. Later that year, he played for Sweden at the 2006 World Championships in Latvia, a tournament in which Sweden defeated the Czech Republic 4–0 in the final. Sweden became the first team in hockey history to win the Olympic gold and the World Championship in the same year. He recorded an international career-high nine points over eight games to tie for second in team scoring, while also leading Sweden in shots on goal.

Four years later, Samuelsson attracted media attention after being left off the Swedish roster for the 2010 Winter Olympics. He told reporters, "I pretty much have one comment and maybe I'll regret it. But they [Team Sweden officials] can go fuck themselves," adding that he was not interested in being later added to the roster in the event of an injury. His omission was highly publicized by Swedish media as he was in the midst of a career season with the Canucks (he went on to record the second-highest goals total among Swedish NHLers that season in 2009–10, with 30). Sweden went on to lose to Slovakia in the quarterfinal, failing to medal.

== Coaching career ==
On May 30, 2022, the Vancouver Canucks announced that Mikael Samuelsson would be joining their department of player development.

== Playing style ==
Samuelsson's primary offensive attribute is his shot. Rather than relying on stickhandling in the offensive zone, his primary tendency is to direct the puck towards the net, hoping for a rebound. Before becoming an offensive threat later in his career, he established himself first as a defensively responsible forward in the NHL, earning time on the penalty kill and against opposing team's top players. Strong on his skates, he is also noted to play aggressively, as well. As a result, Samuelsson is known as a versatile, two-way player.

== Personal life ==
Samuelsson was born in Mariefred, a town 65 kilometres (40 mi) from the Swedish capital of Stockholm. He and his wife Sandra have two children, a son, William, and a daughter, Stina. In the off-seasons, Samuelsson returns with his family to the Stockholm area, where he owns a home in Nykvarn. After the Red Wings' championship victory in 2008, he brought the Stanley Cup with him to Nykvarn and had a civic reception with the Cup in Mariefred on July 29, 2008. Aside from hockey, Samuelsson is an avid golfer.

In September 2010, Samuelsson posted an online charity auction for fans in Sweden to benefit minor hockey in Mariefred. The highest bidder at $6,500, won an all-expenses paid trip for two to Vancouver, featuring tickets to two Canucks games at Rogers Arena, access to the team's locker room and a five-night stay in Samuelsson's personal home. Samuelsson has also been involved in the National Hockey League Players' Association (NHLPA)'s Goals and Dreams program, which provides equipment to minor hockey teams around the world, including Mariefred.

== Career statistics ==
=== Regular season and playoffs ===
			Regular season					Playoffs
Season	Team	League	GP	G	A	Pts	PIM	GP	G	A	Pts	PIM
1994–95	Södertälje SK	J20	30	8	6	14	12	—	—	—	—	—
1995–96	Södertälje SK	J20	22	13	12	25	20	—	—	—	—	—
1995–96	Södertälje SK	SWE–2	18	5	1	6	0	4	0	0	0	0
1996–97	Södertälje SK	J20	2	2	1	3	0	—	—	—	—	—
1996–97	Södertälje SK	SEL	29	4	2	6	10	—	—	—	—	—
1997–98	Södertälje SK	SEL	31	8	8	16	47	—	—	—	—	—
1997–98	IK Nyköping Hockey 90	SWE–2	10	5	1	6	4	—	—	—	—	—
1998–99	Västra Frölunda HC	SEL	27	0	5	5	10	—	—	—	—	—
1998–99	Södertälje SK	SWE–2	18	13	10	23	26	10	2	2	4	6
1999–2000	Brynäs IF	SEL	40	4	3	7	76	11	7	2	9	6
2000–01	Kentucky Thoroughblades	AHL	66	32	46	78	58	3	1	0	1	0
2000–01	San Jose Sharks	NHL	4	0	0	0	0	—	—	—	—	—
2001–02	Hartford Wolf Pack	AHL	8	3	6	9	12	—	—	—	—	—
2001–02	New York Rangers	NHL	67	6	10	16	23	—	—	—	—	—
2002–03	New York Rangers	NHL	58	8	14	22	32	—	—	—	—	—
2002–03	Pittsburgh Penguins	NHL	22	2	0	2	8	—	—	—	—	—
2003–04	Florida Panthers	NHL	37	3	6	9	35	—	—	—	—	—
2004–05	Genève–Servette HC	NLA	12	2	4	6	14	—	—	—	—	—
2004–05	Södertälje SK	SEL	29	7	13	20	45	10	3	3	6	24
2005–06	Rapperswil–Jona Lakers	NLA	1	0	0	0	0	—	—	—	—	—
2005–06	Detroit Red Wings	NHL	71	23	22	45	42	6	0	1	1	6
2006–07	Detroit Red Wings	NHL	53	14	20	34	28	18	3	8	11	14
2007–08	Detroit Red Wings	NHL	73	11	29	40	26	22	5	8	13	8
2008–09	Detroit Red Wings	NHL	81	19	21	40	50	23	5	5	10	6
2009–10	Vancouver Canucks	NHL	74	30	23	53	64	12	8	7	15	16
2010–11	Vancouver Canucks	NHL	75	18	32	50	36	11	1	2	3	8
2011–12	Vancouver Canucks	NHL	6	1	2	3	6	—	—	—	—	—
2011–12	Florida Panthers	NHL	48	13	15	28	14	7	0	5	5	2
2012–13	Detroit Red Wings	NHL	4	0	1	1	0	5	1	1	2	2
2013–14	Grand Rapids Griffins	AHL	2	0	0	0	0	—	—	—	—	—
2013–14	Detroit Red Wings	NHL	26	1	2	3	6	—	—	—	—	—
2014–15	Djurgårdens IF	SHL	37	13	13	26	34	2	0	0	0	0
NHL totals			699	149	197	346	370	104	23	37	60	62
SEL/SHL totals			193	35	44	79	222	23	10	5	15	30

=== International ===
Year	Team	Event	Result	GP	G	A	Pts	PIM
2005	Sweden	WC	4th	9	1	4	5	4
2006	Sweden	Oly	1st place, gold medalist(s)	8	1	3	4	2
2006	Sweden	WC	1st place, gold medalist(s)	8	4	5	9	4
Senior totals				25	6	12	18	10

Statistics taken from Eliteprospects.com

== Awards ==
Award	Year
Winter Olympic gold medal (with Sweden)	2006
World Championship gold medal (with Sweden)	2006
Stanley Cup (with Detroit Red Wings)	2008
Triple Gold Club	2008
NHL First Star of the Week	March 15, 2010
NHL Second Star of the Week	February 6, 2011
