= 2000–01 Allsvenskan (ice hockey) season =

Swedish ice hockey season

The 2000–01 Allsvenskan season was the second season of the Allsvenskan, the second level of ice hockey in Sweden. 23 teams participated in the league, and Södertälje SK, Linköpings HC, Hammarby IF, and IK Okarshamn qualified for the Kvalserien.

== Regular season ==
=== Northern Group ===
	Club	GP	W	OTW	OTL	L	GF	GA	Pts
1.	Nyköpings Hockey 90	26	17	1	3	5	119	66	56
2.	Hammarby IF	26	16	1	3	6	122	83	53
3.	Skellefteå AIK	26	16	1	1	8	96	66	51
4.	Södertälje SK	26	14	3	2	7	94	63	50
5.	Bodens IK	26	14	3	1	8	90	73	49
6.	IF Sundsvall Hockey	26	14	2	1	9	86	66	47
7.	Piteå HC	26	8	3	0	15	66	93	30
8.	Mora IK	26	8	0	4	14	71	89	28
9.	Tierps HK	26	5	4	2	15	75	110	25
10.	Kiruna IF	26	6	1	2	17	64	103	22
11.	Vallentuna BK	26	4	2	2	18	73	144	18

=== Southern Group ===
	Club	GP	W	OTW	OTL	L	GF	GA	Pts
1.	Linköpings HC	28	22	2	1	3	134	47	71
2.	Bofors IK	28	17	2	3	6	117	78	58
3.	Rögle BK	28	15	2	7	4	106	70	56
4.	Tingsryds AIF	28	14	2	2	10	97	81	48
5.	IK Oskarshamn	28	14	2	2	10	93	79	48
6.	Gislaveds SK	28	12	4	3	9	92	88	47
7.	IFK Kumla	28	12	1	1	14	74	86	39
8.	Tranås AIF	28	9	4	2	13	98	99	37
9.	IF Troja-Ljungby	28	10	2	1	15	94	102	35
10.	IFK Arboga IK	28	7	2	1	18	68	121	26
11.	Mölndals IF	28	5	2	1	20	81	152	20
12.	Mörrums GoIS IK	28	5	1	2	20	68	119	19

== SuperAllsvenskan ==
	Club	GP	W	OTW	OTL	L	GF	GA	Pts
1.	Södertälje SK	14	8	1	0	5	45	36	26
2.	Linköpings HC	14	6	2	2	4	49	33	24
3.	Hammarby IF	14	6	2	1	5	36	29	23
4.	Tingsryds AIF	14	6	1	2	5	37	37	22
5.	Skellefteå AIK	14	5	2	3	4	39	40	22
6.	Nyköpings Hockey 90	14	5	1	3	5	38	46	20
7.	Bofors IK	14	5	2	0	7	41	47	19
8.	Rögle BK	14	3	1	1	9	36	53	12

== Qualification round ==
=== Northern Group ===
	Club	GP	W	OTW	OTL	L	GF	GA	Pts (Bonus)
1.	Bodens IK	12	9	0	0	3	59	29	34(7)
2.	Mora IK	12	9	0	1	2	48	24	32(4)
3.	IF Sundsvall Hockey	12	7	0	1	4	38	32	28(6)
4.	Piteå HC	12	3	2	1	6	31	45	19(5)
5.	Kiruna IF	12	4	1	1	6	41	40	17(2)
6.	Tierps HK	12	3	2	1	6	33	51	17(3)
7.	Vallentuna BK	12	1	1	1	9	30	59	7(1)

=== Southern Group ===
	Club	GP	W	OTW	OTL	L	GF	GA	Pts (Bonus)
1.	IK Oskarshamn	14	8	1	1	4	68	49	34(7)
2.	IF Troja-Ljungby	14	8	1	0	5	56	56	29(3)
3.	Gislaveds SK	14	5	2	2	5	43	44	27(6)
4.	Tranås AIF	14	6	1	1	6	61	40	25(4)
5.	IFK Arboga IK	14	4	3	5	2	43	41	25(2)
6.	Mörrums GoIS IK	14	6	2	2	4	47	37	24(0)
7.	IFK Kumla	14	4	2	2	6	39	51	23(5)
8.	Mölndals IF	14	2	1	0	11	33	72	9(1)

== Playoffs ==
=== First round ===
- Bodens IK - Nyköpings Hockey 90 2:1 (1:0, 1:2, 3:2 OT)
- Mora IK - Tingsryds AIF 2:1 (2:1, 2:5, 5:0)
- IF Troja-Ljungby - Hammarby IF 0:2 (2:3, 3:7)
- IK Oskarshamn - Skellefteå AIK 2:0 (4:0, 5:2)

=== Second round ===
- Mora IK - Hammarby IF 1:2 (4:5, 3:2, 0:4)
- Bodens IK - IK Oskarshamn 1:2 (3:5, 3:2 SO, 2:5)

== Relegation round ==
=== Northern Group ===
	Club	GP	W	OTW	OTL	L	GF	GA	Pts
1.	Huddinge IK	8	8	0	0	0	55	15	24
2.	Almtuna IS	8	5	0	0	3	44	23	15
3.	AIK Hockey Härnösand	8	4	0	0	4	36	47	12
4.	Vallentuna BK	8	3	0	0	5	24	43	9
5.	Örnsköldsviks SK	8	0	0	0	8	22	53	0

=== Southern Group ===
	Club	GP	W	OTW	OTL	L	GF	GA	Pts
1.	Halmstad Hammers HC	10	7	0	1	2	43	30	22
2.	HC Örebro 90	10	5	3	0	2	44	34	21
3.	IFK Kumla	10	5	2	1	2	35	28	20
4.	Borås HC	10	6	0	1	3	43	33	19
5.	Mölndals IF	10	1	1	2	6	45	62	7
6.	Grums IK	10	0	0	1	9	30	53	1
