= 2007–08 HockeyAllsvenskan season =

- League: HockeyAllsvenskan
- Sport: Ice hockey
- Total attendance: 722,405 (regular season)
- Average attendance: 2,007 (regular season)
- First place: Leksands IF
- Top scorer: Jens Bergenström (Leksand)
- Promoted to HockeyAllsvenskan to Elitserien: Rögle BK
- Relegated to Division 1 from HockeyAllsvenskan: Nyköpings HK*; *Denied elite license for the following season Hammarby IF**; **Later dissolved due to bankruptcy

HockeyAllsvenskan seasons
- ← 2006–07 2008–09 →

The 2007–08 HockeyAllsvenskan season was the third season of the HockeyAllsvenskan, the second level of ice hockey in Sweden. 16 teams participated in the league, and the top four qualified for the Kvalserien, with the opportunity to be promoted to the Elitserien.

== Participating teams ==
2007–08 HockeyAllsvenskan teams

== Regular season ==
	Club	GP	W	OTW	T	OTL	L	GF	GA	Pts
1.	Leksands IF	45	33	3	2	1	6	190	88	108
2.	Malmö Redhawks	45	31	1	2	4	7	178	97	101
3.	Rögle BK	45	26	4	2	2	11	150	107	90
4.	IF Björklöven	45	26	2	3	1	13	137	103	86
5.	VIK Västerås HK	45	24	1	2	4	14	143	110	80
6.	Växjö Lakers Hockey	45	20	4	5	1	15	133	109	74
7.	Borås HC	45	16	5	4	3	17	131	144	65
8.	IK Oskarshamn	45	16	6	2	1	20	138	131	63
9.	Bofors IK	45	17	3	4	2	19	135	128	63
10.	AIK	45	17	3	2	1	22	129	142	60
11.	Nybro IF	45	15	3	0	3	24	117	163	54
12.	Almtuna IS	45	13	2	6	3	21	100	142	52
13.	Nyköpings HK*	45	14	1	3	4	23	139	152	51
14.	IF Sundsvall Hockey	45	12	2	4	5	22	98	133	49
15.	Huddinge IK	45	12	0	3	3	27	99	151	42
16.	Hammarby IF**	45	4	1	2	3	35	93	210	19

*Nyköpings HK was relegated to Division 1 due to no elite license. Huddinge IK took their spot for the following HockeyAllsvenskan season.
**Hammarby IF chose not to participate in the relegation round due to their financial situation. The club later went bankrupt in April 2008.

== Playoffs ==
=== First round ===
- Borås HC - IF Björklöven 2:0 (4:1, 3:2 OT)
- Växjö Lakers Hockey - VIK Västerås HK 1:2 (3:6, 3:1, 1:4)

=== Second round ===
- Borås HC - VIK Västerås HK 0:2 (2:3 OT, 1:4)

== Relegation round ==
	Club	GP	W	OTW	T	OTL	L	GF	GA	Pts
1.	IF Troja-Ljungby	8	5	0	2	0	1	33	16	17
2.	Mariestad BoIS HC	8	5	0	1	0	2	27	28	16
3.	Huddinge IK*	8	3	0	1	0	4	21	25	10
4.	Väsby IK	8	2	0	1	1	4	26	28	8
5.	Asplöven HC	8	0	1	3	0	4	18	28	5

*Nyköpings HK was relegated to Division 1 due to no elite license. Huddinge IK took their spot for the following HockeyAllsvenskan season.
