= 1993–94 Division 1 season (Swedish ice hockey) =

- League: Division 1
- Sport: Ice hockey
- Number of teams: 42
- Promoted to Division 1: AIK to Elitserien
- Relegated to Division 2: Vännäs HC; Hofors HC; Väsby IK; Roma IF; Hanhals HF

Division 1 seasons
- ← 1992–93 1994–95 →

1993-94 was the 19th season that Division 1 operated as the second tier of ice hockey in Sweden, below the top-flight Elitserien (now the SHL).

== Format ==
Division 1 was divided into four starting groups. The Eastern Group consisted of 12 teams, and the other groups were made up of 10 teams each. The top two teams in each group qualified for the Allsvenskan, while the remaining eight teams had to compete in a qualifying round. The teams were given zero to seven bonus points based on their finish in the first round. The top two teams from each qualifying round qualified for the playoffs. The two lowest placed teams in the Eastern Group were relegated directly to Division 2, while the third-to-last-place team had to play in a relegation series to retain their spot in Division 1 for the following season. The last-place team in each of the other three qualifying groups was relegated directly to Division 2, while the second-to-last-place team had to play in a relegation series.

Of the 10 teams in the Allsvenskan - in addition to the eight participants from Division 1, the two last place teams from the Elitserien also participated - the top two teams qualified directly for the Allsvenskan final, from which the winner was promoted directly to the Elitserien (now the SHL). The second place team qualified for the Kvalserien, which offered another opportunity to be promoted. The third and fourth place teams in the Allsvenskan qualified for the third round of the playoffs, while teams that finished fifth through eighth played in the second round. The three playoff winners qualified for the Kvalserien, in which the first-place team qualified for the following Elitserien season.

== Regular season ==
=== Northern Group ===
==== First round ====
	Club	GP	W	T	L	GF	GA	Pts
1.	Bodens IK	18	14	2	2	101	38	30
2.	Kiruna IF	18	14	1	3	105	40	29
3.	Skellefteå AIK	18	14	0	4	83	38	28
4.	IF Sundsvall/Timrå IK	18	11	1	6	76	53	23
5.	Husums IF	18	9	1	8	72	83	19
6.	Piteå HC	18	6	2	10	60	83	14
7.	CRIF	18	6	2	10	46	80	14
8.	Östersunds IK	18	5	2	11	53	96	12
9.	Antjärns IK	18	2	2	14	52	101	6
10.	Vännäs HC	18	2	1	15	37	73	5

==== Qualification round ====
	Club	GP	W	T	L	GF	GA	Pts (Bonus)
1.	Skellefteå AIK	14	11	1	2	70	25	30(7)
2.	IF Sundsvall/Timrå IK	14	10	1	3	69	34	27(6)
3.	CRIF	14	9	2	3	62	46	23(3)
4.	Piteå HC	14	7	0	7	53	48	18(4)
5.	Husums IF	14	5	0	9	50	57	15(5)
6.	Östersunds IK	14	3	3	8	54	86	11(2)
7.	Antjärns IK	14	3	2	9	35	50	9(1)
8.	Vännäs HC	14	2	3	9	42	59	7(0)

=== Western Group ===
==== First round ====
	Club	GP	W	T	L	GF	GA	Pts
1.	Örebro IK	18	14	2	2	112	45	30
2.	Mora IK	18	12	5	1	102	42	29
3.	Gävle HF	18	11	5	2	82	37	27
4.	Uppsala AIS	18	8	2	8	69	65	18
5.	Grums IK	18	6	4	8	56	70	16
6.	IFK Kumla	18	6	2	10	56	80	14
7.	Arvika HC	18	5	4	9	45	74	14
8.	Sunne IK	18	4	4	10	57	91	12
9.	Avesta BK	18	5	1	12	54	89	11
10.	Hofors HC	18	4	1	13	47	87	9

==== Qualification round ====
	Club	GP	W	T	L	GF	GA	Pts (Bonus)
1.	Uppsala AIS	14	10	1	3	54	36	27(6)
2.	Gävle HF	14	9	0	5	57	43	25(7)
3.	Grums IK	14	8	3	3	63	41	24(5)
4.	Arvika HC	14	6	2	6	52	53	17(3)
5.	IFK Kumla	14	5	1	8	43	46	15(4)
6.	Avesta BK	14	5	3	6	51	49	14(1)
7.	Sunne IK	14	3	3	8	43	54	11(2)
8.	Hofors HC	14	3	1	10	37	78	7(0)

=== Eastern Group ===
==== First round ====
	Club	GP	W	T	L	GF	GA	Pts
1.	AIK	22	17	3	2	137	45	37
2.	Huddinge IK	22	17	2	3	110	44	36
3.	Södertälje SK	22	14	5	3	70	34	33
4.	Hammarby IF	22	13	4	5	112	67	30
5.	Vallentuna BK	22	8	4	10	69	72	20
6.	Nyköpings Hockey	22	10	0	12	73	90	20
7.	IK Tälje	22	8	3	11	75	96	19
8.	Danderyd/Täby	22	7	3	12	63	99	17
9.	Väsby IK	22	5	5	12	63	78	15
10.	IFK Österåker	22	7	1	14	50	103	15
11.	Arlanda HC	22	5	2	15	58	100	12
12.	Roma IF	22	5	0	17	64	116	10

==== Qualification round ====
	Club	GP	W	T	L	GF	GA	Pts (Bonus)
1.	Hammarby IF	18	13	2	3	106	40	37(8)
2.	Södertälje SK	18	10	6	2	69	31	35(9)
3.	Vallentuna BK	18	12	3	3	68	39	34(7)
4.	Arlanda HC	18	9	2	7	64	52	21(1)
5.	Nyköpings Hockey	18	6	3	9	57	66	21(6)
6.	IK Tälje	18	4	4	10	50	77	17(5)
7.	Danderyd/Täby	18	2	8	8	40	57	16(4)
8.	IFK Österåker	18	6	2	10	40	80	16(2)
9.	Väsby IK	18	5	2	11	52	86	15(3)
10.	Roma IF	18	6	1	11	57	75	13(0)

=== Southern Group ===
==== First round ====
	Club	GP	W	T	L	GF	GA	Pts
1.	IF Troja-Ljungby	18	15	0	3	130	54	30
2.	IK Vita Hästen	18	13	1	4	82	49	27
3.	IK Pantern	18	8	4	6	74	53	20
4.	Borås HC	18	10	0	8	54	63	20
5.	Linköpings HC	18	9	1	8	64	68	19
6.	Tingsryds AIF	18	7	3	8	69	64	17
7.	Mölndals IF	18	7	2	9	72	82	16
8.	Mörrums GoIS	18	6	2	10	84	103	14
9.	Hanhals HF	18	4	1	13	57	110	9
10.	Västerviks IK	18	3	2	13	56	96	8

==== Qualification round ====
	Club	GP	W	T	L	GF	GA	Pts (Bonus)
1.	IK Pantern	14	10	2	2	77	38	29(7)
2.	Tingsryds AIF	14	8	3	3	56	32	23(4)
3.	Borås HC	14	7	2	5	54	47	22(6)
4.	Mörrums GoIS	14	4	5	5	47	54	15(2)
5.	Mölndals IF	14	5	1	8	47	61	14(3)
6.	Linköpings HC	14	3	3	8	45	60	14(5)
7.	Västerviks IK	14	5	2	7	33	42	12(0)
8.	Hanhals HF	14	4	2	8	43	68	11(1)

== Allsvenskan ==
	Club	GP	W	T	L	GF	GA	Pts
1.	Färjestad BK	18	11	5	2	75	36	27
2.	Bodens IK	18	13	1	4	76	41	27
3.	AIK	18	10	4	4	72	52	24
4.	Huddinge IK	18	9	4	5	65	48	22
5.	Mora IK	18	6	5	7	54	65	17
6.	IF Troja-Ljungby	18	6	4	8	52	65	16
7.	IF Björklöven	18	5	4	9	51	65	14
8.	IK Vita Hästen	18	5	3	10	46	66	13
9.	Örebro IK	18	5	2	11	57	71	12
10.	Kiruna IF	18	2	4	12	40	79	8

=== Final ===
- Färjestad BK - Bodens IK 3:0 (7:3, 6:0, 6:2)

== Playoffs ==
=== First round ===
- Skellefteå AIK - Södertälje SK 2:1 (3:4, 3:2 OT, 3:2)
- Uppsala AIS - Tingsryds AIF 1:2 (6:2, 4:7, 4:5 OT)
- Hammarby IF - IF Sundsvall/Timrå IK 2:0 (7:2, 4:2)
- IK Pantern - Gävle HF 2:1 (5:3, 3:4, 5:1)

=== Second round ===
- Mora IK - Hammarby IF 2:1 (8:2, 3:5, 4:3 OT)
- IF Troja-Ljungby - IK Pantern 2:1 (3:7, 8:6, 6:3)
- IF Björklöven - Skellefteå AIK 0:2 (3:4, 3:6)
- IK Vita Hästen - Tingsryds AIF 2:0 (3:2 OT, 3:2)

=== Third round ===
- Huddinge IK - IF Troja-Ljungby 0:2 (2:5, 1:6)
- AIK - Skellefteå AIK 2:1 (5:2, 1:4, 5:1)
- IK Vita Hästen - Mora IK 2:0 (6:3, 5:1)
