= 2004–05 Allsvenskan (ice hockey) season =

Swedish ice hockey season

The 2004–05 Allsvenskan season was the sixth season of the Allsvenskan, the second level of ice hockey in Sweden. 23 teams participated in the league, and Leksands IF, Skellefteå AIK, IK Nyköping, and IK Oskarshamn qualified for the Kvalserien.

== Regular season ==
=== Northern Group ===
	Club	GP	W	OTW	T	OTL	L	GF	GA	Pts
1.	Leksands IF	32	26	1	1	0	4	142	65	81
2.	Skellefteå AIK	32	21	4	1	0	6	164	83	72
3.	IF Björklöven	32	19	2	1	3	7	128	86	65
4.	Bofors IK	32	20	2	1	0	9	120	82	65
5.	Västerås IK	32	18	1	5	1	9	105	71	62
6.	Piteå HC	32	9	5	0	3	15	75	101	40
7.	IFK Arboga IK	32	11	0	3	2	16	99	105	38
8.	IF Sundsvall Hockey	32	9	2	1	6	14	92	99	38
9.	Almtuna IS	32	10	2	3	0	17	73	109	37
10.	Tegs SK	32	9	1	0	1	21	78	122	30
11.	Uppsala Hockey	32	8	0	0	2	22	84	136	26
12.	Bodens IK	32	4	0	0	2	26	48	149	14

=== Southern Group ===
	Club	GP	W	OTW	T	OTL	L	GF	GA	Pts
1.	Rögle BK	30	19	2	4	0	5	120	75	65
2.	IK Oskarshamn	30	17	2	7	0	4	95	61	62
3.	Hammarby IF	30	15	3	3	3	6	94	59	57
4.	IK Nyköping	30	16	1	3	1	9	106	86	54
5.	Växjö Lakers	30	13	2	4	2	9	81	70	49
6.	Skövde IK	30	12	0	2	2	14	83	101	40
7.	IF Troja-Ljungby	30	10	3	3	0	14	87	91	39
8.	Halmstad Hammers HC	30	9	0	4	2	15	73	93	33
9.	Nybro IF	30	5	3	3	2	17	85	106	26
10.	Mörrums GoIS IK	30	7	0	2	3	18	68	108	26
11.	Huddinge IK	30	6	1	4	2	18	69	111	25

== SuperAllsvenskan ==
	Club	GP	W	OTW	T	OTL	L	GF	GA	Pts
1.	Leksands IF	14	8	3	0	1	2	54	32	31
2.	Skellefteå AIK	14	10	0	1	0	3	46	37	31
3.	IK Nyköping	14	8	1	1	1	3	39	34	28
4.	Rögle BK	14	9	0	0	0	5	53	34	27
5.	IK Oskarshamn	14	5	0	1	1	7	28	33	17
6.	Bofors IK	14	4	0	3	0	7	38	52	15
7.	Hammarby IF	14	2	0	1	1	10	31	45	8
8.	IF Björklöven	14	2	0	1	0	11	34	56	7

== Qualification round ==
=== Northern Group ===
	Club	GP	W	OTW	T	OTL	L	GF	GA	Pts (Bonus)
1.	Almtuna IS	14	11	0	2	0	1	64	29	38(3)
2.	Västerås IK	14	9	1	1	0	3	66	29	37(7)
3.	IFK Arboga IK	14	8	0	1	1	4	54	37	31(5)
4.	IF Sundsvall Hockey	14	6	2	1	1	4	38	33	28(4)
5.	Piteå HC	14	6	0	1	2	5	36	36	27(6)
6.	Bodens IK	14	5	0	0	0	9	29	58	15(0)
7.	Tegs SK	14	2	0	0	1	11	29	61	9(2)
8.	Uppsala Hockey	14	1	2	0	0	11	36	69	8(1)

=== Southern Group ===
	Club	GP	W	OTW	T	OTL	L	GF	GA	Pts (Bonus)
1.	Halmstad Hammers HC	12	8	1	1	0	2	43	26	31(4)
2.	Växjö Lakers	12	6	2	1	0	3	40	25	30(7)
3.	Skövde IK	12	6	0	1	1	4	34	27	26(6)
4.	IF Troja-Ljungby	12	4	1	1	2	4	40	40	22(5)
5.	Nybro IF	12	4	1	0	0	7	36	38	17(3)
6.	Mörrums GoIS IK	12	4	0	0	2	6	28	46	16(2)
7.	Huddinge IK	12	2	1	0	1	8	38	57	10(1)

== Playoffs ==
=== First round ===
- Almtuna IS - Bofors IK 1:2 (4:2, 2:4, 2:4)
- Halmstad Hammers HC - IK Oskarshamn 0:2 (2:5, 1:2)
- Västerås IK - Rögle BK 2:0 (3:1, 1:0 OT)
- Växjö Lakers - IK Nyköping 0:2 (1:3, 2:3)

=== Second round ===
- Västerås IK - IK Nyköping 1:2 (2:0, 0:3, 3:5)
- Bofors IK - IK Oskarshamn 0:2 (2:4, 1:7)

== Relegation round ==
=== Northern Group ===
	Club	GP	W	OTW	T	OTL	L	GF	GA	Pts
1.	IFK Arboga IK	8	5	0	2	0	1	32	18	17
2.	IF Sundsvall Hockey	8	5	0	1	0	2	20	16	16
3.	HC Örebro 90	8	4	0	1	0	3	30	20	13
4.	Piteå HC	8	4	0	0	0	4	23	19	12
5.	Kovlands IF	8	0	0	0	0	8	5	37	0

=== Southern Group ===
	Club	GP	W	OTW	T	OTL	L	GF	GA	Pts
1.	AIK	10	6	0	2	0	2	38	21	20
2.	Nybro IF	10	6	0	1	0	3	23	22	19
3.	Skövde IK	10	6	0	0	0	4	27	22	18
4.	IF Troja-Ljungby	10	5	0	2	0	3	32	26	17
5.	Borås HC	10	2	1	1	0	6	20	28	9
6.	Mörrums GoIS IK	10	1	0	0	1	8	17	38	4
