= 1994–95 Division 1 season (Swedish ice hockey) =

- League: Division 1
- Sport: Ice hockey
- Number of teams: 40
- Promoted to Division 1: none to Elitserien
- Relegated to Division 2: Östersunds IK; Avesta BK; Danderyd/Täby; Mölndals IF

Division 1 seasons
- ← 1993–94 1995–96 →

1994-95 was the 20th season that Division 1 operated as the second tier of ice hockey in Sweden, below the top-flight Elitserien (now the SHL).

== Format ==
Division 1 was divided into four starting groups of 10 teams each. The top two teams in each group qualified for the Allsvenskan, while the remaining eight teams had to compete in a qualifying round. The teams were given zero to seven bonus points based on their finish in the first round. The top two teams from each qualifying round qualified for the playoffs. The last-place team in each of the qualifying groups was relegated directly to Division 2, while the second-to-last-place team had to play in a relegation series.

Of the 10 teams in the Allsvenskan - in addition to the eight participants from Division 1, the two last place teams from the Elitserien also participated - the top two teams qualified directly for the Allsvenskan final, from which the winner was promoted directly to the Elitserien (now the SHL). The second place team qualified for the Kvalserien, which offered another opportunity to be promoted. The third and fourth place teams in the Allsvenskan qualified for the third round of the playoffs, while teams that finished fifth through eighth played in the second round. The three playoff winners qualified for the Kvalserien, in which the first-place team qualified for the following Elitserien season.

== Regular season ==
=== Northern Group ===
==== First round ====
	Club	GP	W	T	L	GF	GA	Pts
1.	Bodens IK	18	14	1	3	105	27	29
2.	Kiruna IF	18	14	1	3	100	56	29
3.	Skellefteå AIK	18	13	1	4	74	35	27
4.	IF Björklöven	18	9	2	7	86	61	20
5.	S/T Hockey	18	8	2	8	62	69	18
6.	IF Sundsvall	18	5	4	9	56	77	14
7.	Husums IF	18	5	3	10	63	88	13
8.	Piteå HC	18	6	1	11	56	98	13
9.	Östersunds IK	18	4	1	13	41	78	9
10.	CRIF	18	2	4	12	46	108	8

==== Qualification round ====
	Club	GP	W	T	L	GF	GA	Pts (Bonus)
1.	IF Björklöven	14	12	2	0	75	34	32(6)
2.	Skellefteå AIK	14	11	0	3	62	30	29(7)
3.	S/T Hockey	14	9	0	5	61	40	23(5)
4.	Piteå HC	14	5	5	4	47	48	17(2)
5.	IF Sundsvall	14	4	3	7	47	56	15(4)
6.	Husums IF	14	3	2	9	56	72	11(3)
7.	CRIF	14	3	2	9	39	65	8(0)
8.	Östersunds IK	14	1	2	11	34	76	5(1)

=== Western Group ===
==== First round ====
	Club	GP	W	T	L	GF	GA	Pts
1.	Mora IK	18	11	6	1	93	43	28
2.	Örebro IK	18	12	3	3	88	47	27
3.	Sunne IK	18	9	4	5	66	53	22
4.	Surahammars IF	18	8	4	6	70	61	20
5.	Gävle HF	18	8	4	6	63	57	20
6.	Grums IK	18	8	2	8	69	64	18
7.	Avesta BK	18	7	4	7	62	63	18
8.	Arvika HC	18	5	2	11	52	83	12
9.	IFK Munkfors	18	2	4	12	50	93	8
10.	IFK Kumla	18	3	1	14	45	95	7

==== Qualification round ====
	Club	GP	W	T	L	GF	GA	Pts (Bonus)
1.	Sunne IK	14	9	1	4	60	50	26(7)
2.	Surahammars IF	14	7	1	6	59	53	21(6)
3.	Gävle HF	14	6	2	6	46	44	19(5)
4.	Grums IK	14	4	5	5	60	49	17(4)
5.	IFK Munkfors	14	7	1	6	56	60	16(1)
6.	Arvika HC	14	4	5	5	47	51	15(2)
7.	IFK Kumla	14	5	3	6	45	51	13(0)
8.	Avesta BK	14	4	2	8	39	56	13(3)

=== Eastern Group ===
==== First round ====
	Club	GP	W	T	L	GF	GA	Pts
1.	Huddinge IK	18	14	2	2	93	45	30
2.	Hammarby IF	18	12	2	4	81	55	26
3.	Södertälje SK	18	9	6	3	63	39	24
4.	Uppsala AIS	18	8	3	7	60	57	19
5.	Nyköpings Hockey 90	18	7	4	7	61	69	18
6.	Östervåla IF	18	7	3	8	63	74	17
7.	Arlanda HC	18	5	3	10	63	74	13
8.	Haninge HC	18	6	1	11	58	77	13
9.	Vallentuna BK	18	4	3	11	52	71	11
10.	Danderyd/Täby	18	3	3	12	49	82	9

==== Qualification round ====
	Club	GP	W	T	L	GF	GA	Pts (Bonus)
1.	Södertälje SK	14	12	0	2	73	28	31(7)
2.	Nyköpings Hockey 90	14	7	2	5	63	59	21(5)
3.	Haninge HC	14	8	2	4	56	54	20(2)
4.	Uppsala AIS	14	6	1	7	60	55	19(6)
5.	Östervåla IF	14	6	1	7	50	55	17(4)
6.	Arlanda HC	14	6	1	7	48	55	16(3)
7.	Vallentuna BK	14	3	2	9	41	64	14(1)
8.	Danderyd/Täby	14	3	1	10	58	79	7(0)

=== Southern Group ===
==== First round ====
	Club	GP	W	T	L	GF	GA	Pts
1.	IF Troja-Ljungby	18	15	1	2	89	37	31
2.	IK Vita Hästen	18	13	3	2	79	48	29
3.	Tingsryds AIF	18	13	2	3	82	43	28
4.	IK Pantern	18	10	3	5	81	63	23
5.	Mariestads BoIS	18	5	5	8	62	65	15
6.	Borås HC	18	5	2	11	51	85	12
7.	Mörrums GoIS	18	5	1	12	70	87	11
8.	Tranås AIF	18	4	3	11	47	71	11
9.	Linköpings HC	18	5	0	13	43	71	10
10.	Mölndals IF	18	3	4	11	46	80	10

==== Qualification round ====
	Club	GP	W	T	L	GF	GA	Pts (Bonus)
1.	Tingsryds AIF	14	9	2	3	57	23	27(7)
2.	IK Pantern	14	9	2	3	67	47	26(6)
3.	Mariestads BoIS	14	9	2	3	52	39	25(5)
4.	Linköpings HC	14	9	1	4	65	50	20(1)
5.	Mörrums GoIS	14	4	3	7	46	52	14(3)
6.	Borås HC	14	4	2	8	41	63	14(4)
7.	Tranås AIF	14	3	1	10	54	77	9(2)
8.	Mölndals IF	14	2	1	11	38	69	5(0)

== Allsvenskan ==
	Club	GP	W	T	L	GF	GA	Pts
1.	Rögle BK	18	13	3	2	84	46	29
2.	Västra Frölunda HC	18	12	2	4	106	50	26
3.	IF Troja-Ljungby	18	11	2	5	70	51	24
4.	Kiruna IF	18	7	6	5	54	54	20
5.	Bodens IK	18	8	1	9	71	65	17
6.	Huddinge IK	18	5	5	8	57	73	15
7.	IK Vita Hästen	18	6	2	10	54	61	14
8.	Mora IK	18	5	4	9	55	81	14
9.	Örebro IK	18	5	2	11	51	80	12
10.	Hammarby IF	18	3	3	12	46	87	9

=== Final ===
- Rögle BK - Västra Frölunda HC 2:3 (4:7, 5:2, 3:2, 4:5 OT, 0:5)

== Playoffs ==
=== First round ===
- IF Björklöven - Surahammars IF 2:0 (7:1, 4:1)
- Sunne IK - Skellefteå AIK 1:2 (4:1, 3:4, 4:3)
- Södertälje SK - IK Pantern 1:2 (5:2, 3:7, 4:5)
- Tingsryds AIF - Nyköpings Hockey 2:1 (3:5, 3:2, 4:3)

=== Second round ===
- Bodens IK - Skellefteå AIK 2:0 (5:2, 5:0)
- Huddinge IK - Tingsryds AIF 0:2 (2:3, 1:2)
- IK Vita Hästen - IF Björklöven 2:0 (5:1, 5:3)
- Mora IK - IK Pantern 1:2 (3:6, 5:2, 3:5)

=== Third round ===
- IF Troja-Ljungby - Tingsryds AIF 2:0 (4:2, 7:4)
- Kiruna IF - IK Vita Hästen 1:2 (4:1, 2:3, 2:6)
- Bodens IK - IK Pantern 2:0 (6:2, 6:5)
