= 1992–93 Division 1 season (Swedish ice hockey) =

- League: Division 1
- Sport: Ice hockey
- Number of teams: 40
- Promoted to Division 1: IF Björklöven to Elitserien
- Relegated to Division 2: Tegs SK; Nacka HK; Östervåla IF; Tyringe SoSS

Division 1 seasons
- ← 1991–92 1993–94 →

1992–93 was the 18th season that Division 1 operated as the second tier of ice hockey in Sweden, below the top-flight Elitserien (now the SHL).

== Format ==
Division 1 was divided into four starting groups of 10 teams each. The top two teams in each group qualified for the Allsvenskan, while the remaining eight teams had to compete in a qualifying round. The teams were given zero to seven bonus points based on their finish in the first round. The top two teams from each qualifying round qualified for the playoffs. The last-place team in each of the qualifying groups was relegated directly to Division 2, while the second-to-last-place team had to play in a relegation series.

Of the 10 teams in the Allsvenskan - in addition to the eight participants from Division 1, the two last place teams from the Elitserien also participated - the top two teams qualified directly for the Allsvenskan final, from which the winner was promoted directly to the Elitserien (now the SHL). The second place team qualified for the Kvalserien, which offered another opportunity to be promoted. The third and fourth place teams in the Allsvenskan qualified for the third round of the playoffs, while teams that finished fifth through eighth played in the second round. The three playoff winners qualified for the Kvalserien, in which the first-place team qualified for the following Elitserien season.

== Regular season ==
=== Northern Group ===
==== First round ====
	Club	GP	W	T	L	GF	GA	Pts
1.	Bodens IK	18	15	0	3	83	47	30
2.	IF Björklöven	18	14	1	3	99	39	29
3.	Skellefteå AIK	18	14	1	3	88	48	29
4.	IF Sundsvall/Timrå IK	18	13	0	5	84	45	26
5.	Kiruna IF	18	10	1	7	89	54	21
6.	Husums IF	18	8	1	9	79	66	17
7.	Vännäs HC	18	4	1	13	47	87	9
8.	Piteå HC	18	3	2	13	50	97	8
9.	Antjärns IK	18	3	2	13	60	129	8
10.	Tegs SK	18	1	1	16	41	108	3

==== Qualification round ====
	Club	GP	W	T	L	GF	GA	Pts (Bonus)
1.	IF Sundsvall/Timrå IK	14	13	0	1	81	31	32(6)
2.	Skellefteå AIK	14	11	1	2	83	39	30(7)
3.	Kiruna IF	14	9	1	4	69	46	24(5)
4.	Vännäs HC	14	6	1	7	39	58	16(3)
5.	Husums IF	14	5	1	8	57	64	15(4)
6.	Piteå HC	14	4	1	9	58	64	11(2)
7.	Antjärns IK	14	3	0	11	33	70	7(1)
8.	Tegs SK	14	2	1	11	37	85	5(0)

=== Western Group ===
==== First round ====
	Club	GP	W	T	L	GF	GA	Pts
1.	Huddinge IK	18	13	3	2	123	36	29
2.	Örebro IK	18	12	5	1	82	32	29
3.	Södertälje SK	18	14	0	4	99	46	28
4.	Hammarby IF	18	11	1	6	106	58	23
5.	Grums IK	18	10	2	6	75	60	22
6.	IK Tälje	18	8	3	7	78	83	19
7.	Arvika HC	18	7	1	10	62	83	15
8.	IK Westmannia Köping	18	5	1	12	58	80	11
9.	IFK Kumla	18	1	1	16	34	132	3
10.	Nacka HK	18	0	1	17	43	150	1

==== Qualification round ====
	Club	GP	W	T	L	GF	GA	Pts (Bonus)
1.	Hammarby IF	14	13	1	0	87	29	33(6)
2.	Södertälje SK	14	8	4	2	57	36	27(7)
3.	Grums IK	14	6	3	5	52	49	20(5)
4.	Arvika HC	14	6	3	5	64	40	18(3)
5.	IK Tälje	14	7	0	7	66	63	18(4)
6.	IK Westmannia Köping	14	5	1	8	48	58	13(2)
7.	IFK Kumla	14	2	2	10	36	66	7(1)
8.	Nacka HK	14	2	0	12	39	88	4(0)

=== Eastern Group ===
==== First round ====
	Club	GP	W	T	L	GF	GA	Pts
1.	Mora IK	18	15	2	1	97	36	32
2.	Gävle HF	18	9	3	6	73	67	21
3.	Roma IF	18	9	2	7	76	72	20
4.	Avesta BK	18	9	2	7	71	67	20
5.	Danderyd/Täby	18	7	5	6	62	57	19
6.	Vallentuna BK	18	7	4	7	71	72	18
7.	Arlanda HC	18	7	4	7	49	61	18
8.	Väsby IK	18	6	4	8	63	66	16
9.	Uppsala AIS	18	5	4	9	56	62	14
10.	Östervåla IF	18	0	2	16	29	87	2

==== Qualification round ====
	Club	GP	W	T	L	GF	GA	Pts (Bonus)
1.	Danderyd/Täby	14	9	4	1	63	36	27(5)
2.	Roma IF	14	7	4	3	66	44	24(6)
3.	Vallentuna BK	14	8	2	4	51	43	22(4)
4.	Avesta BK	14	5	4	5	53	60	21(7)
5.	Uppsala AIS	14	6	1	7	49	44	14(1)
6.	Väsby IK	14	4	3	7	38	46	13(2)
7.	Arlanda HC	14	2	4	8	33	49	11(3)
8.	Östervåla IF	14	4	0	10	33	64	8(0)

=== Southern Group ===
==== First round ====
	Club	GP	W	T	L	GF	GA	Pts
1.	IF Troja-Ljungby	18	16	1	1	107	40	33
2.	IK Vita Hästen	18	14	2	2	97	45	30
3.	IK Pantern	18	11	3	4	81	71	25
4.	Hanhals HF	18	8	3	7	65	76	19
5.	Mörrums GoIS	18	7	4	7	80	79	18
6.	Mölndals IF	18	7	1	10	71	68	15
7.	Nyköpings NH90	18	6	3	9	50	66	15
8.	Västerviks IK	18	5	4	9	67	88	14
9.	Borås HC	18	4	1	13	69	86	9
10.	Tyringe SoSS	18	1	0	17	37	105	2

==== Qualification round ====
	Club	GP	W	T	L	GF	GA	Pts (Bonus)
1.	IK Pantern	14	10	3	1	70	51	30(7)
2.	Mörrums GoIS	14	7	2	5	63	61	21(5)
3.	Nyköpings NH90	14	8	1	5	76	54	20(3)
4.	Hanhals HF	14	5	2	7	56	61	18(6)
5.	Mölndals IF	14	4	4	6	49	59	16(4)
6.	Borås HC	14	5	4	5	62	63	15(1)
7.	Västerviks IK	14	4	2	8	45	58	12(2)
8.	Tyringe SoSS	14	3	2	9	46	60	8(0)

== Allsvenskan ==
	Club	GP	W	T	L	GF	GA	Pts
1.	Västra Frölunda HC	18	14	2	2	91	40	30
2.	Huddinge IK	18	12	3	3	74	42	27
3.	IF Björklöven	18	12	2	4	75	41	26
4.	AIK	18	10	4	4	77	57	24
5.	IF Troja-Ljungby	18	8	3	7	79	70	19
6.	Mora IK	18	7	2	9	64	65	16
7.	Örebro IK	18	3	8	7	63	60	14
8.	IK Vita Hästen	18	4	3	11	61	87	11
9.	Gävle HF	18	3	1	14	42	105	7
10.	Bodens IK	18	3	0	15	41	100	6

=== Attendance ===
#	Club	Average home attendance	Average away attendance	Average overall attendance
1	Västra Frölunda HC	5,298	2,872	4,085
2	AIK	4,627	4,690	4,658
3	IK Vita Hästen	3,077	2,319	2,698
4	IF Björklöven	3,069	2,882	2,976
5	Huddinge IK	2,713	3,692	3,203
6	Örebro IK	2,221	2,089	2,155
7	IF Troja/Ljungby	2,094	2,135	2,115
8	Mora IK	1,780	2,469	2,124
9	Bodens IK	1,239	2,151	1,695
10	Team Gävle HF	455	2,039	1,247

=== Final ===
- Västra Frölunda HC - Huddinge IK 3:0 (6:2, 5:2, 4:0)

== Playoffs ==
=== First round ===
- IF Sundsvall/Timrå IK - Roma IF 2:0 (2:1, 5:4)
- Hammarby IF - Mörrums GoIS 2:1 (5:0, 2:4, 8:2)
- Danderyd/Täby - Skellefteå AIK 0:2 (1:2, 2:3 OT)
- IK Pantern - Södertälje SK 2:0 (4:2, 4:3)

=== Second round ===
- IF Troja-Ljungby - IK Pantern 2:0 (4:3 OT, 9:6)
- Örebro IK - Skellefteå AIK 2:1 (4:3 OT, 2:3, 2:1)
- Mora IK - IF Sundsvall/Timrå IK 2:1 (2:8, 4:3 OT, 5:3)
- IK Vita Hästen - Hammarby IF 0:2 (1:4, 2:4)

=== Third round ===
- IF Björklöven - Örebro IK 2:1 (3:0, 3:5, 3:1)
- AIK - Hammarby IF 0:2 (4:5, 4:6)
- Mora IK - IF Troja-Ljungby 0:2 (2:4, 0:4)
