= 1996–97 Division 1 season (Swedish ice hockey) =

- League: Division 1
- Sport: Ice hockey
- Number of teams: 40
- Promoted to Division 1: none to Elitserien
- Relegated to Division 2: Tegs SK; Borlänge HF; Österåker; Olofströms IK

Division 1 seasons
- ← 1995–96 1997–98 →

1996-97 was the 22nd season that Division 1 operated as the second tier of ice hockey in Sweden, below the top-flight Elitserien (now the SHL).

== Format ==
Division 1 was divided into four starting groups of 10 teams each. The top two teams in each group qualified for the Allsvenskan, while the remaining eight teams had to compete in a qualifying round. The teams were given zero to seven bonus points based on their finish in the first round. The top two teams from each qualifying round qualified for the playoffs. The last-place team in each of the qualifying groups was relegated directly to Division 2, while the second-to-last-place team had to play in a relegation series to retain their spot in Division 1 for the following season.

Of the eight teams in the Allsvenskan, the top two qualified directly for the Kvalserien. The third-sixth place teams qualified for the second round of the playoffs. The two playoff winners qualified for the Kvalserien, in which the top two teams qualified for the following Elitserien season.

== Regular season ==
=== Northern Group ===
==== First round ====
	Club	GP	W	T	L	GF	GA	Pts
1.	IF Björklöven	18	15	2	1	95	29	32
2.	Skellefteå AIK	18	14	1	3	80	49	29
3.	Timrå IK	18	12	1	5	79	48	25
4.	Kiruna IF	18	10	2	6	77	54	22
5.	IF Sundsvall	18	8	2	8	53	44	18
6.	Bodens IK	18	8	1	9	64	75	17
7.	Husums IF	18	4	4	10	56	74	12
8.	Örnsköldsviks SK	18	5	2	11	53	86	12
9.	Piteå HC	18	4	0	14	43	82	8
10.	Tegs SK	18	2	1	15	39	98	5

==== Qualification round ====
	Club	GP	W	T	L	GF	GA	Pts (Bonus)
1.	Timrå IK	14	13	1	0	84	25	34(7)
2.	Kiruna IF	14	8	3	3	63	36	25(6)
3.	IF Sundsvall	14	6	3	5	45	41	20(5)
4.	Bodens IK	14	4	6	4	38	43	18(4)
5.	Husums IF	14	3	3	8	39	66	12(3)
6.	Piteå HC	14	4	2	8	40	63	11(1)
7.	Örnsköldsviks SK	14	3	2	9	57	67	10(2)
8.	Tegs SK	14	3	4	7	40	65	10(0)

=== Western Group ===
==== First round ====
	Club	GP	W	T	L	GF	GA	Pts
1.	Mora IK	18	14	2	2	99	39	30
2.	IFK Kumla	18	12	3	3	87	52	27
3.	Grums IK	18	10	3	5	88	61	23
4.	Sunne IK	18	8	4	6	76	65	20
5.	Surahammars IF	18	8	2	8	88	79	18
6.	Falun HF	18	6	5	7	63	57	17
7.	Örebro IK	18	6	4	8	74	71	16
8.	Fagersta AIK	18	5	2	11	58	103	12
9.	Borlänge HF	18	4	4	10	53	99	12
10.	IFK Munkfors	18	2	1	15	49	109	5

==== Qualification round ====
	Club	GP	W	T	L	GF	GA	Pts (Bonus)
1.	Sunne IK	14	9	2	3	71	49	26(6)
2.	Grums IK	14	9	1	4	68	47	26(7)
3.	Falun HF	14	8	1	5	45	44	21(4)
4.	Örebro IK	14	8	1	5	63	43	20(3)
5.	Surahammars IF	14	5	2	7	63	54	17(5)
6.	IFK Munkfors	14	5	3	6	41	63	13(0)
7.	Fagersta AIK	14	2	4	8	42	70	10(2)
8.	Borlänge HF	14	3	0	11	40	63	7(1)

=== Eastern Group ===
==== First round ====
	Club	GP	W	T	L	GF	GA	Pts
1.	Hammarby IF	18	14	2	2	93	35	30
2.	Huddinge IK	18	13	4	1	87	37	30
3.	Nyköpings HC	18	11	3	4	66	50	25
4.	Östervåla IF	18	10	2	6	65	63	22
5.	Uppsala AIS	18	8	4	6	63	64	20
6.	Arlanda HC	18	8	0	10	69	61	16
7.	Väsby IK	18	6	3	9	59	59	15
8.	Haninge HC	18	5	1	12	50	86	11
9.	Wisby	18	2	2	14	51	121	6
10.	Österåker	18	1	3	14	43	80	5

==== Qualification round ====
	Club	GP	W	T	L	GF	GA	Pts (Bonus)
1.	Uppsala AIS	14	10	1	3	72	41	26(5)
2.	Nyköpings HC	14	4	8	2	43	34	23(7)
3.	Arlanda HC	14	5	6	3	64	48	20(4)
4.	Östervåla IF	14	4	6	4	60	55	20(6)
5.	Wisby	14	4	6	4	49	51	15(1)
6.	Haninge HC	14	5	3	6	52	57	15(2)
7.	Väsby IK	14	4	3	7	43	55	14(3)
8.	Österåker	14	2	3	9	32	74	7(0)

=== Southern Group ===
==== First round ====
	Club	GP	W	T	L	GF	GA	Pts
1.	Linköpings HC	18	14	2	2	83	35	30
2.	IF Troja-Ljungby	18	13	3	2	86	37	29
3.	Västerviks IK	18	8	4	6	50	58	20
4.	IK Oskarshamn	18	8	2	8	68	64	18
5.	Tingsryds AIF	18	8	2	8	52	58	18
6.	Mörrums GoIS	18	6	5	7	52	55	17
7.	Mariestads BoIS	18	6	3	9	53	62	15
8.	Olofströms IK	18	5	4	9	40	66	14
9.	Rögle BK	18	6	1	11	55	72	13
10.	Tranås AIF	18	3	0	15	51	86	6

==== Qualification round ====
	Club	GP	W	T	L	GF	GA	Pts (Bonus)
1.	Tingsryds AIF	14	8	2	4	52	39	23(7)
2.	Västerviks IK	14	4	4	6	42	49	19(5)
3.	Tranås AIF	14	8	2	4	58	38	18(0)
4.	Mörrums GoIS	14	6	2	6	47	46	18(4)
5.	IK Oskarshamn	14	5	2	7	50	58	18(6)
6.	Mariestads BoIS	14	5	4	5	38	34	17(3)
7.	Rögle BK	14	6	1	7	41	48	14(1)
8.	Olofströms IK	14	5	1	8	32	48	13(2)

== Allsvenskan ==
	Club	GP	W	T	L	GF	GA	Pts
1.	IF Troja-Ljungby	14	10	2	2	55	32	22
2.	IF Björklöven	14	9	2	3	66	41	20
3.	Skellefteå AIK	14	6	4	4	54	42	16
4.	Linköpings HC	14	6	3	5	53	42	15
5.	Mora IK	14	6	2	6	49	45	14
6.	Huddinge IK	14	3	6	5	42	39	12
7.	Hammarby IF	14	4	2	8	34	60	10
8.	IFK Kumla	14	0	3	11	29	81	3

== Playoffs ==
=== First round ===
- Timrå IK - Nyköpings HC 0:2 (5:6 OT, 2:3 OT)
- Sunne IK - Västerviks IK 0:2 (3:4, 2:4)
- Uppsala AIS - Kiruna IF 0:2 (2:3, 1:2 OT)
- Tingsryds AIF - Grums IK 2:0 (3:0, 5:3)

=== Second round ===
- Mora IK - Tingsryds AIF 2:0 (5:3, 3:2 OT)
- Skellefteå AIK - Kiruna IF 2:1 (2:0, 3:4, 5:0)
- Linköpings HC - Nyköpings HC 2:0 (5:2, 7:3)
- Huddinge IK - Västerviks IK 0:2 (1:2, 1:2)

=== Third round ===
- Linköpings HC - Västerviks IK 2:0 (5:2, 3:0)
- Skellefteå AIK - Mora IK 1:2 (3:2 OT, 2:3, 2:3 OT)
