= 1997–98 Division 1 season (Swedish ice hockey) =

- League: Division 1
- Sport: Ice hockey
- Number of teams: 39
- Promoted to Division 1: IF Björklöven to Elitserien
- Relegated to Division 2: Kalix HF; Haninge HC; Östervåla IF; Väsby IK; Västerviks IK; Mariestads BoIS

Division 1 seasons
- ← 1996–97 1998–99 →

1997-98 was the 23rd season that Division 1 operated as the second tier of ice hockey in Sweden, below the top-flight Elitserien (now the SHL).

== Format ==
Division 1 was divided into four starting groups of 10 teams each (except for the Western Group, which only had nine). The top two teams in each group qualified for the Allsvenskan, while the remaining eight teams had to compete in a qualifying round. The teams were given zero to seven bonus points based on their finish in the first round. The top two teams in each qualifying round qualified for the playoffs. The 14 worst teams in the qualifying round had to play in a relegation round to decide their participation in the following season.

Of the eight teams in the Allsvenskan, the top two qualified directly for the Kvalserien. The third-sixth place teams qualified for the second round of the playoffs. The two playoff winners qualified for the Kvalserien, in which the top two teams qualified for the following Elitserien season.

== Regular season ==
=== Northern Group ===
==== First round ====
	Club	GP	W	T	L	GF	GA	Pts
1.	IF Björklöven	18	14	1	3	95	31	29
2.	Timrå IK	18	13	2	3	75	28	28
3.	Bodens IK	18	12	2	4	68	33	26
4.	Skellefteå AIK	18	11	2	5	70	45	24
5.	IF Sundsvall	18	10	3	5	68	48	24
6.	Kalix HF	18	8	2	8	50	57	18
7.	Örnsköldsviks SK	18	3	5	10	51	101	11
8.	Husums IF	18	4	1	13	50	73	9
9.	Kiruna IF	18	3	1	14	36	78	7
10.	Piteå HC	18	2	1	15	32	101	4

==== Qualification round ====
	Club	GP	W	T	L	GF	GA	Pts
1.	Bodens IK	12	10	1	1	48	29	28
2.	Skellefteå AIK	12	6	1	5	42	34	19
3.	IF Sundsvall	12	6	2	4	43	40	19
4.	Örnsköldsviks SK	12	5	2	5	44	41	15
5.	Piteå HC	12	6	2	4	42	35	14
6.	Kalix HF	12	2	0	10	27	52	8
7.	Kiruna IF	12	3	0	9	34	49	7

=== Western Group ===
==== First round ====
	Club	GP	W	T	L	GF	GA	Pts
1.	Mora IK	14	10	2	2	79	23	22
2.	Grums IK	15	9	3	3	70	43	21
3.	Örebro IK	14	9	1	4	51	37	19
4.	Bofors IK	15	6	5	4	51	46	17
5.	IFK Kumla	14	6	2	6	55	43	14
6.	Sunne IK	14	5	4	5	49	50	14
7.	Surahammars IF	14	4	3	7	41	72	11
8.	IFK Arboga	14	2	2	10	38	56	6
9.	IFK Munkfors	14	1	2	11	28	92	4

==== Qualification round ====
	Club	GP	W	T	L	GF	GA	Pts
1.	Örebro IK	12	7	2	3	59	28	23
2.	Bofors IK	12	7	0	5	46	30	19
3.	IFK Kumla	12	6	2	4	44	35	18
4.	IFK Arboga	12	5	4	3	46	42	16
5.	Sunne IK	12	4	2	6	23	42	16
6.	IFK Munkfors	12	4	1	7	34	53	10
7.	Surahammars IF	12	3	1	8	39	61	10

=== Eastern Group ===
==== First round ====
	Club	GP	W	T	L	GF	GA	Pts
1.	Arlanda HC	18	14	3	1	100	48	31
2.	Huddinge IK	18	13	3	2	66	25	29
3.	Lidingö HC	18	11	3	4	81	50	25
4.	Nyköpings HC	18	7	4	7	69	62	18
5.	Hammarby IF	18	8	2	8	64	58	18
6.	Uppsala AIS	18	7	3	8	52	59	17
7.	Östervåla IF	18	7	2	9	45	55	16
8.	Haninge HC	18	4	2	12	53	80	10
9.	IFK Tumba	18	4	1	13	51	74	9
10.	Väsby IK	18	3	1	14	34	104	7

==== Qualification round ====
	Club	GP	W	T	L	GF	GA	Pts
1.	Lidingö HC	14	7	2	5	73	46	23
2.	Uppsala AIS	14	9	1	4	52	39	23
3.	IFK Tumba	14	10	1	3	53	40	22
4.	Nyköpings HC	14	7	2	5	50	43	22
5.	Hammarby IF	14	6	4	4	46	41	21
6.	Haninge HC	14	6	1	7	58	50	15
7.	Östervåla IF	14	4	2	8	39	60	13
8.	Väsby IK	14	0	1	13	28	80	1

=== Southern Group ===
==== First round ====
	Club	GP	W	T	L	GF	GA	Pts
1.	Linköpings HC	18	15	2	1	102	42	32
2.	IF Troja-Ljungby	18	12	2	4	86	39	26
3.	Rögle BK	18	10	1	7	88	60	21
4.	Tranås AIF	18	9	1	8	75	66	19
5.	Tingsryds AIF	18	9	1	8	56	53	19
6.	Mörrums GoIS	18	8	1	9	71	75	17
7.	IK Oskarshamn	18	7	1	10	52	68	15
8.	Västerviks IK	18	6	1	11	43	83	13
9.	Olofströms IK	18	4	2	12	50	83	10
10.	Mariestads BoIS	18	4	0	14	39	93	8

==== Qualification round ====
	Club	GP	W	T	L	GF	GA	Pts
1.	Rögle BK	14	9	4	1	71	38	29
2.	Tingsryds AIF	14	8	4	2	48	24	25
3.	Tranås AIF	14	6	2	6	45	50	20
4.	IK Oskarshamn	14	7	2	5	63	48	19
5.	Mörrums GoIS	14	5	4	5	58	58	18
6.	Olofströms IK	14	3	5	6	36	49	12
7.	Västerviks IK	14	4	0	10	32	64	10
8.	Mariestads BoIS	14	3	1	10	27	49	7

== Promotion round ==
=== Allsvenskan ===
	Club	GP	W	T	L	GF	GA	Pts
1.	IF Troja-Ljungby	14	8	3	3	52	37	19
2.	Linköpings HC	14	7	5	2	55	41	19
3.	IF Björklöven	14	7	4	3	56	38	18
4.	Mora IK	14	8	2	4	44	34	18
5.	Timrå IK	14	6	2	6	50	43	14
6.	Arlanda HC	14	3	5	6	51	59	11
7.	Grums IK	14	3	1	10	41	75	7
8.	Huddinge IK	14	1	4	9	34	56	6

=== Playoffs ===
==== First round ====
- Uppsala AIS - Rögle BK 4:4/2:3
- Skellefteå AIK - Örebro IK 2:2/5:2
- Tingsryds AIF - IFK Lidingö 3:2/2:5
- Bofors IK - Bodens IK 0:1/2:4

==== Second round ====
- Skellefteå AIK - IF Björklöven 1:2/0:1
- Rögle BK - Mora IK 5:3/0:7
- Bodens IK - Timrå IK 1:5/2:3
- IFK Lidingö - Arlanda HC 4:6/5:2

==== Third round ====
- IFK Lidingö - Timrå IK 2:7/3:4
- Mora IK - IF Björklöven 2:2/1:9

== Relegation round ==
=== Northern Group ===
	Club	GP	W	T	L	GF	GA	Pts
1.	Piteå HC	8	6	0	2	37	26	12
2.	Kiruna IF	8	4	1	3	33	25	9
3.	AIK Härnösand	8	4	1	3	34	35	9
4.	Kalix HF	8	3	1	4	28	33	7
5.	Tegs SK	8	1	1	6	23	38	3

=== Western Group ===
	Club	GP	W	T	L	GF	GA	Pts
1.	Surahammars IF	10	8	2	0	52	26	18
2.	Sunne IK	10	6	3	1	56	24	15
3.	Arvika HC	10	5	2	3	39	37	12
4.	Skåre BK	10	5	1	4	44	45	11
5.	IFK Munkfors	10	1	0	9	27	43	2
6.	Valbo AIF	10	1	0	9	20	63	2

=== Eastern Group ===
	Club	GP	W	T	L	GF	GA	Pts
1.	Hammarby IF	10	8	0	2	37	17	16
2.	Vallentuna BK	10	5	3	2	32	24	13
3.	Östervåla IF	10	5	2	3	35	22	12
4.	Haninge HC	10	3	3	4	27	27	9
5.	Järfälla HC	10	2	1	7	23	43	5
6.	Väsby IK	10	2	1	7	23	43	5

=== Southern Group ===
	Club	GP	W	T	L	GF	GA	Pts
1.	Olofströms IK	10	6	2	2	33	25	14
2.	Mörrums GoIS	10	4	4	2	36	29	12
3.	Västervik IK	10	4	2	4	35	28	10
4.	Kings HC	10	3	3	4	27	34	9
5.	Kristianstad IK	10	3	2	5	30	42	8
6.	Mariestads BoIS	10	2	3	5	26	29	7
