= 1998–99 Division 1 season (Swedish ice hockey) =

- League: Division 1
- Sport: Ice hockey
- Number of teams: 32
- Promoted to Division 1: Linköpings HC to Elitserien

Division 1 seasons
- ← 1997–98 1999–2000 →

The 1998–99 Division 1 season was the 24th and last season that Division 1 operated as the second tier of ice hockey in Sweden, below the top-flight Elitserien (now the SHL). The Allsvenskan was founded as the new second-level league for the 1999-2000 season. Division 1 became the new third-level league for the following season.

== Format ==
Division 1 was divided into four starting groups of eight teams each. The top two teams in each group qualified for the Allsvenskan, while the remaining six teams had to compete in a qualifying round. The teams were given zero to five bonus points based on their finish in the first round. The top two teams in each qualifying round qualified for the playoffs. The four worst teams in each qualifying group had to play in a relegation round in an attempt to qualify for the new Allsvenskan for the following season.

Of the eight teams in the Allsvenskan, the top two qualified directly for the Kvalserien. The third-sixth place teams qualified for the second round of the playoffs. The two playoff winners qualified for the Kvalserien, in which the top two teams qualified for the following Elitserien season.

== Regular season ==
=== Northern Group ===
==== First round ====
	Club	GP	W	T	L	GF	GA	Pts
1.	Timrå IK	28	23	2	3	152	47	48
2.	IF Sundsvall	28	15	7	6	107	65	37
3.	Skellefteå AIK	28	15	4	9	111	79	34
4.	Bodens IK	28	11	7	10	84	86	29
5.	Piteå HC	28	13	3	12	114	118	29
6.	Kiruna IF	28	11	4	13	96	109	26
7.	Örnsköldsviks SK	28	8	1	19	74	121	17
8.	AIK Härnösand	28	1	2	25	56	169	4

==== Qualification round ====
	Club	GP	W	T	L	GF	GA	Pts (Bonus)
1.	Piteå HC	10	9	0	1	54	24	21(3)
2.	Skellefteå AIK	10	8	0	2	47	17	21(5)
3.	Bodens IK	10	4	1	5	36	40	13(4)
4.	Örnsköldsviks SK	10	3	3	4	39	39	10(1)
5.	Kiruna IF	10	1	4	5	26	40	8(2)
6.	AIK Härnösand	10	0	2	8	23	65	2(0)

=== Western Group ===
==== First round ====
	Club	GP	W	T	L	GF	GA	Pts
1.	Mora IK	28	19	5	4	137	61	43
2.	IFK Arboga	28	15	6	7	115	84	36
3.	IFK Kumla	28	15	3	10	108	87	33
4.	Bofors IK	28	11	8	9	97	97	30
5.	Grums IK	28	11	6	11	112	115	28
6.	Örebro IK	28	8	7	13	93	112	23
7.	Surahammars IF	28	10	0	18	87	127	20
8.	Sunne IK	28	3	5	20	70	136	11

==== Qualification round ====
	Club	GP	W	T	L	GF	GA	Pts (Bonus)
1.	Bofors IK	8	5	3	0	44	20	17(4)
2.	IFK Kumla	8	4	3	1	31	21	16(5)
3.	Grums IK	8	4	1	3	29	26	12(3)
4.	Sunne IK	8	2	1	5	26	31	5(0)
5.	Surahammars IF	8	1	0	7	23	55	3(1)

=== Eastern Group ===
==== First round ====
	Club	GP	W	T	L	GF	GA	Pts
1.	Södertälje SK	28	20	3	5	112	54	43
2.	Huddinge IK	28	19	4	5	84	49	42
3.	Arlanda HC	28	16	9	3	116	69	41
4.	Lidingö HC	28	14	6	8	88	66	34
5.	Hammarby IF	28	9	4	15	87	95	22
6.	Nyköpings HC	28	6	2	20	73	106	14
7.	Tumba/Botkyrka HC	28	7	0	21	69	127	14
8.	Uppsala AIS	28	6	2	20	63	126	14

==== Qualification round ====
	Club	GP	W	T	L	GF	GA	Pts (Bonus)
1.	Arlanda HC	10	6	1	3	46	34	18(5)
2.	Hammarby IF	10	7	0	3	43	22	17(3)
3.	Lidingö HC	10	5	1	4	44	36	15(4)
4.	Nyköpings HC	10	5	1	4	44	41	13(2)
5.	Uppsala AIS	10	2	3	5	24	48	7(0)
6.	Tumba/Botkyrka HC	10	1	2	7	25	45	5(1)

=== Southern Group ===
==== First round ====
	Club	GP	W	T	L	GF	GA	Pts
1.	Linköpings HC	28	18	7	3	132	72	43
2.	IF Troja-Ljungby	28	14	7	7	120	85	35
3.	Rögle BK	28	11	12	5	102	80	34
4.	Tranås AIF	28	13	4	11	106	105	30
5.	Tingsryds AIF	28	12	5	11	132	112	29
6.	IK Oskarshamn	28	9	5	14	101	125	23
7.	Olofströms IK	28	7	3	18	97	137	17
8.	Mörrums GoIS	28	6	1	21	67	141	13

==== Qualification round ====
	Club	GP	W	T	L	GF	GA	Pts (Bonus)
1.	Rögle BK	10	8	0	2	59	25	21(5)
2.	Tranås AIF	10	8	0	2	49	26	20(4)
3.	Tingsryds AIF	10	6	1	3	50	30	16(3)
4.	Mörrums GoIS	10	3	2	5	32	59	8(0)
5.	IK Oskarshamn	10	2	1	7	28	52	7(2)
6.	Olofströms IK	10	0	2	8	33	59	3(1)

== Promotion round ==
=== Allsvenskan ===
	Club	GP	W	T	L	GF	GA	Pts
1.	Södertälje SK	14	9	3	2	58	31	21
2.	Linköpings HC	14	9	3	2	52	36	21
3.	Mora IK	14	7	4	3	46	28	18
4.	Timrå IK	14	6	1	7	39	34	13
5.	IF Troja-Ljungby	14	4	4	6	33	44	12
6.	IF Sundsvall	14	3	5	6	35	46	11
7.	Huddinge IK	14	3	3	8	27	35	9
8.	IFK Arboga	14	2	3	9	28	64	7

=== Playoffs ===
==== First round ====
- IFK Kumla - Bofors IK 2:1 (6:2, 3:4, 4:2)
- Hammarby IF - Arlanda HC 2:0 (7:1, 4:2)
- Skellefteå AIK - Piteå HC 2:0 (5:3, 6:4)
- Tranås AIF - Rögle BK 1:2 (2:3 OT., 4:3, 2:6)

==== Second round ====
- IFK Kumla - Timrå IK 0:2 (1:8, 4:6)
- Hammarby IF - IF Sundsvall 1:2 (1:3, 2:1 SO, 4:7)
- Rögle BK - Mora IK 0:2 (4:6, 4:6)
- Skellefteå AIK - IF Troja-Ljungby 1:2 (2:1 OT, 1:3, 4:5 OT)

==== Third round ====
- Timrå IK - Mora IK 0:2 (2:4, 1:3)
- IF Sundsvall - IF Troja-Ljungby 0:2 (0:1, 1:2 OT)

== Relegation round ==
=== Northern Group ===
	Club	GP	W	T	L	GF	GA	Pts
1.	Bodens IK	10	8	1	1	47	21	17
2.	Kiruna IF	10	8	1	1	40	21	17
3.	Kalix HF	10	4	2	4	37	39	10
4.	AIK Härnösand	10	4	0	6	31	37	8
5.	Örnsköldsviks SK	10	3	1	6	36	35	7
6.	KB-65	10	0	1	9	18	65	1

=== Western Group ===
	Club	GP	W	T	L	GF	GA	Pts
1.	Grums IK	8	8	0	0	61	17	16
2.	Sunne IK	8	4	0	4	29	28	8
3.	Surahammars IF	8	4	0	4	27	30	8
4.	Arvika HC	8	3	1	4	26	35	7
5.	Valbo AIF	8	0	1	7	18	51	1

=== Eastern Group ===
	Club	GP	W	T	L	GF	GA	Pts
1.	Lidingö HC	10	9	0	1	53	24	18
2.	Nyköpings HC	10	6	2	2	51	31	14
3.	Uppsala AIS	10	4	2	4	39	40	10
4.	Tumba/Botkyrka HC	10	3	2	5	43	32	8
5.	Mälarhöjden-Bredäng	10	2	3	5	26	41	7
6.	Tierps IF	10	1	1	8	22	66	3

=== Southern Group ===
	Club	GP	W	T	L	GF	GA	Pts
1.	Tingsryds AIF	10	8	1	1	64	21	17
2.	IK Oskarshamn	10	6	1	3	46	34	13
3.	Gislaveds SK	10	5	2	3	45	44	12
4.	Olofströms IK	10	4	2	4	35	42	10
5.	Mörrums GoIS	10	1	2	7	29	47	4
6.	Nittorps IK	10	1	2	7	23	54	4
