= 1995–96 Division 1 season (Swedish ice hockey) =

- League: Division 1
- Sport: Ice hockey
- Number of teams: 40
- Promoted to Division 1: Södertälje SK to Elitserien
- Relegated to Division 2: CRIF; Arvika HC; Vallentuna BK; IK Pantern

Division 1 seasons
- ← 1994–95 1996–97 →

1995-96 was the 21st season that Division 1 operated as the second tier of ice hockey in Sweden, below the top-flight Elitserien (now the SHL).

== Format ==
Division 1 was divided into four starting groups of 10 teams each. The top two teams in each group qualified for the Allsvenskan, while the remaining eight teams had to compete in a qualifying round. The teams were given zero to seven bonus points based on their finish in the first round. The top two teams from each qualifying round qualified for the playoffs. The last-place team in each of the qualifying groups was relegated directly to Division 2, while the second-to-last-place team had to play in a relegation series.

Of the 10 teams in the Allsvenskan - in addition to the eight participants from Division 1, the two last place teams from the Elitserien also participated - the top two teams qualified directly for the Allsvenskan final, from which the winner was promoted directly to the Elitserien (now the SHL). The second place team qualified for the Kvalserien, which offered another opportunity to be promoted. The third and fourth place teams in the Allsvenskan qualified for the third round of the playoffs, while teams that finished fifth through eighth played in the second round. The three playoff winners qualified for the Kvalserien, in which the first-place team qualified for the following Elitserien season.

== Regular season ==
=== Northern Group ===
==== First round ====
	Club	GP	W	T	L	GF	GA	Pts
1.	Kiruna IF	18	13	2	3	85	37	28
2.	IF Björklöven	18	13	1	4	109	40	27
3.	Timrå IK	18	12	2	4	72	46	26
4.	Bodens IK	18	11	3	4	94	50	25
5.	IF Sundsvall	18	8	4	6	56	61	20
6.	Skellefteå AIK	18	6	6	6	59	62	18
7.	Piteå HC	18	7	3	8	61	64	17
8.	AIK Härnösand	18	4	1	13	52	87	9
9.	Husums IF	18	3	2	13	48	110	8
10.	CRIF	18	1	0	17	29	108	2

==== Qualification round ====
	Club	GP	W	T	L	GF	GA	Pts (Bonus)
1.	Timrå IK	14	12	1	1	72	36	32(7)
2.	Bodens IK	14	11	1	2	90	32	29(6)
3.	IF Sundsvall	14	10	1	3	68	35	26(5)
4.	Skellefteå AIK	14	4	4	6	41	47	16(4)
5.	Piteå HC	14	5	2	7	55	59	15(3)
6.	Husums IF	14	4	3	7	58	70	12(1)
7.	AIK Härnösand	14	1	2	11	38	77	6(2)
8.	CRIF	14	1	2	11	34	100	4(0)

=== Western Group ===
==== First round ====
	Club	GP	W	T	L	GF	GA	Pts
1.	Mora IK	18	16	0	2	106	49	32
2.	Surahammars IF	18	12	1	5	83	52	25
3.	Falun HF	18	11	2	5	81	62	24
4.	Grums IK	18	11	1	6	80	68	23
5.	Sunne IK	18	9	2	7	54	58	20
6.	Gävle HF	18	7	2	9	71	55	16
7.	Fagersta AIK	18	4	4	10	62	75	12
8.	Arvika HC	18	5	1	12	61	87	11
9.	Örebro IK	18	4	2	12	45	90	10
10.	IFK Munkfors	18	3	1	14	53	100	7

==== Qualification round ====
	Club	GP	W	T	L	GF	GA	Pts (Bonus)
1.	Grums IK	14	11	2	1	74	39	30(6)
2.	Sunne IK	14	8	3	3	53	38	24(5)
3.	Gävle HF	14	5	6	7	57	41	20(4)
4.	IFK Munkfors	14	5	5	4	42	45	17(0)
5.	Falun HF	14	2	3	9	39	62	14(7)
6.	Fagersta AIK	14	3	4	7	46	56	13(3)
7.	Örebro IK	14	5	1	8	53	64	12(1)
8.	Arvika HC	14	4	2	8	50	69	12(2)

=== Eastern Group ===
==== First round ====
	Club	GP	W	T	L	GF	GA	Pts
1.	Södertälje SK	18	16	2	0	93	35	34
2.	Huddinge IK	18	10	3	5	84	44	23
3.	Hammarby IF	18	9	5	4	72	48	23
4.	Uppsala AIS	18	7	4	7	61	57	18
5.	Arlanda HC	18	7	4	7	59	71	18
6.	Östervåla IF	18	7	2	9	68	70	16
7.	Väsby IK	18	7	1	10	52	68	15
8.	Vallentuna BK	18	4	3	11	53	81	11
9.	Haninge HC	18	4	3	11	54	86	11
10.	Nyköpings Hockey 90	18	3	5	10	48	83	11

==== Qualification round ====
	Club	GP	W	T	L	GF	GA	Pts (Bonus)
1.	Arlanda HC	14	11	1	2	66	46	28(5)
2.	Hammarby IF	14	9	2	3	64	46	27(7)
3.	Uppsala AIS	14	9	2	3	65	37	26(6)
4.	Östervåla IF	14	4	4	6	37	42	16(4)
5.	Väsby IK	14	5	2	7	40	52	15(3)
6.	Nyköpings Hockey 90	14	6	1	7	44	58	13(0)
7.	Haninge HC	14	4	2	8	46	51	11(1)
8.	Vallentuna BK	14	1	0	13	36	66	4(2)

=== Southern Group ===
==== First round ====
	Club	GP	W	T	L	GF	GA	Pts
1.	IF Troja-Ljungby	18	12	2	4	92	46	26
2.	Tingsryds AIF	18	11	4	3	77	31	26
3.	Mariestads BoIS	18	10	3	5	60	42	23
4.	Linköpings HC	18	8	4	6	66	57	20
5.	Västerviks IK	18	8	4	6	57	68	20
6.	Mörrums GoIS	18	6	5	7	52	50	17
7.	IK Vita Hästen	18	4	7	7	46	54	15
8.	Tranås AIF	18	6	2	10	50	89	14
9.	Borås HC	18	4	3	11	45	74	11
10.	IK Pantern	18	2	4	12	36	70	8

==== Qualification round ====
	Club	GP	W	T	L	GF	GA	Pts (Bonus)
1.	Linköpings HC	14	10	1	3	64	35	27(6)
2.	Västerviks IK	14	9	1	4	44	29	24(5)
3.	Mörrums GoIS	14	7	3	4	48	44	21(4)
4.	Tranås AIF	14	7	1	6	54	52	17(2)
5.	Mariestads BoIS	14	4	0	10	44	45	15(7)
6.	IK Vita Hästen	14	5	2	7	37	43	15(3)
7.	Borås HC	14	6	1	7	33	50	14(1)
8.	IK Pantern	14	3	1	10	35	61	7(0)

== Allsvenskan ==
	Club	GP	W	T	L	GF	GA	Pts
1.	Brynäs IF	18	17	0	1	95	37	34
2.	Södertälje SK	18	9	4	5	68	42	22
3.	IF Björklöven	18	10	2	6	69	56	22
4.	Kiruna IF	18	10	1	7	56	56	21
5.	Rögle BK	18	9	2	7	82	57	20
6.	IF Troja-Ljungby	18	6	7	5	69	56	19
7.	Huddinge IK	18	7	3	8	61	59	17
8.	Mora IK	18	6	2	10	63	89	14
9.	Tingsryds AIF	18	3	3	12	45	67	9
10.	Surahammars IF	18	1	0	17	43	132	2

=== Final ===
- Brynäs IF - Södertälje SK 1:3 (4:2, 2:5, 3:4, 2:5)

== Playoffs ==
=== First round ===
- Timrå IK - Hammarby IF 2:1 (3:1, 4:5, 4:0)
- Arlanda HC - Bodens IK 2:0 (4:3, 4:3)
- Grums IK - Västerviks IK 2:0 (7:1, 3:0)
- Linköpings HC - Sunne IK 2:0 (8:5, 8:1)

=== Second round ===
- Rögle BK - Timrå IK 2:1 (4:5 OT, 3:2 OT, 5:3)
- IF Troja-Ljungby - Linköpings HC 2:0 (5:2, 2:1)
- Huddinge IK - Arlanda HC 2:0 (3:2, 5:4)
- Mora IK - Grums IK 2:1 (4:3, 3:4 OT, 7:3)

=== Third round ===
- IF Björklöven - Huddinge IK 2:0 (4:2, 4:3 OT)
- Kiruna IF - IF Troja-Ljungby 0:2 (2:3 OT, 2:3)
- Rögle BK - Mora IK 2:1 (4:3, 2:7, 8:4)
