= Mörrums GoIS IK =

Ice hockey club in Mörrum, Sweden

Mörrums GoIS IK is an ice hockey club in Sweden. They play in one of the six Division 1-series in Sweden.
