= IFK Kumla =

Swedish football club

- Full name: Idrottsföreningen Kamraterna Kumla
- Ground: Kumla IP; Kumla; Sweden
- League: Division 2 Södra Svealand

IFK Kumla is a Swedish football club located in Kumla.

== Background ==
IFK Kumla currently plays in Division 3 which is the fifth tier of Swedish football pyramid.

The club is affiliated to Örebro Läns Fotbollförbund.
