= Tranås AIF =

Tranås AIF Hockey
- City: Tranås, Sweden
- League: (Sweden) Division 1 as of the 2013–14 season
- Division: 1 Södra
- Founded: 1905
- Home arena: Stiga Arena
- Website: www.taif.se

Tranås AIF (sometimes abbreviated "TAIF") is a Swedish sports club active in a number of sports including ice hockey. The ice hockey club, Tranås AIF Ishockeyförening, better known as Tranås AIF Hockey (or Tranås AIF IF), played several season in Sweden's second-highest league, Allsvenskan, but since being relegated in 2003 has played in Division 1, the third tier of ice hockey in Sweden.

The club has also had a bandy section and used to play in the top-tier Swedish bandy league.
