= Wings HC Arlanda =

- City: Märsta, Sweden
- League: Division 1
- Division: 1D
- Founded: 1973
- Home arena: Pinbackshallen
- Colors: Navy, gold, silver
- General manager: (Sweden) Björn Danielsson
- Head coach: (Sweden) Johan Silfwerplatz
- Website: www.lagsidan.se/wings

Franchise history
- ?–?: RA 73
- ?–2008: Arlanda Wings
- 2008–present: Wings HC Arlanda

Wings Hockey Club Arlanda (or simply "Wings HC", formerly "RA 73" and "Arlanda Wings") is a Swedish hockey club based in the northern exurb of Märsta in Stockholm County. The club currently plays in group 1D of Division 1, the third tier of the Swedish hockey system.
