= Nyköpings Hockey =

Nyköpings HK
- City: Nyköping, Sweden
- Operated: 1990–2014
- Home arena: PEAB Arena
- Colours: Black, white, red
- Website: www.nykopingshockey.se

Franchise history
- Until 1990: Nyköpings BIS; Nyköpings HL
- 1990–2003: IK Nyköping Hockey 90 (NH90)
- 2003–2007: IK Nyköpings Hockey
- 2007–2014: Nyköpings HK

Nyköpings Hockeyklubb (English: Nyköping Hockey Club, often referred to as Nyköpings HK or Nyköpings Hockey) was an ice hockey club from Nyköping, Sweden, which last played in the Division 1, the third tier of ice hockey in Sweden. The club was founded in 1990 as IK Nyköping Hockey 90 (or NH90), formed through the merger of Nyköpings HL and the ice hockey section of Nyköpings BIS. The club was renamed IK Nyköpings Hockey in 2003, before being given its final name in 2007.

On 15 April 2014, after experiencing financial difficulties for several years, the club went bankrupt and ceased to exist.

== History ==
=== Nyköpings BIS ===
Nyköpings BIS was formed in 1967 though the merger of Nyköpings AIK and Nyköpings SK, and merged as they often found themselves competing in the same division. After 1967, Nyköpings BIS played in the second-level league, Division 1, until the inauguration of the Elitserien as the new top flight of Swedish hockey in 1975. BIS didn't make it to the new slimmer second-level Division 1, and played in the now the third-tier Division 2 until the merger in 1990.

=== Nyköpings HK ===
In 1990, Nyköpings BIS was merged with Nyköpings Hockeylag (Nyköpings HL), created the club as it exists today, though at the time it was given the name Nyköping Hockey 90, or NH90. The newly founded club won their group in that season of Division 2, and—after playoffs and a promotion qualifier—was promoted to Division 1. During their division 1 seasons they used to end up in the middle or bottom of the league, having to play qualification rounds to remain in the league at some point, but when the new second-level league Allsvenskan Norra/Södra (north/south) was inaugurated in the 1999/2000 season, Nyköping became a top team.

They finished fourth in the fall season of the north league and made it to the Superallsvenskan after the New Year, a league for the eight best teams. It had been around since the 1982/83 season, previously called Allsvenskan, then too for the eight best division 1 teams, i.e. two teams each from the four division 1 groups (north, east, west and south). (Furthermore, from 1987/88 to 1995/96 it was played with ten teams, with the two last teams in the Elitserien by New Year joining as well.)

Nyköping avoided the two last spots and got to continue with playoffs for a possible Elitserien promotion and made it through both rounds and played in the final qualification league, kvalserien.

However, even before this season it had been questionable until not long at all before the start of the season whether the club would have the financial means to participate. They made it at the last moment and got a really good season, but the financial problems would more or less remain until the problems led all the way to relegation in 2008.

The team continued to often have good results in the league. They were promoted to the Superallsvenska after New Year in 2000/01 (winning the Allsvenskan Norra in the fall), 2001/02 and 2004/05. In the playoffs they made it all the way to the Kvalserien once more in 2004/05.

In the 2005/06 season the two Allsvenskan leagues were combined into one league, the present HockeyAllsvenskan with sixteen teams. The first season only the four best teams were promoted to the Kvalserien directly, Nyköping came in on 11th place. From the 2006/07 season a playoff was re-inaugurated, the top three teams are promoted to the Kvalserien directly, and the teams ranked 4 through 7 play each other in two playoff rounds for the fourth spot. Nyköping came in on the 7th spot and beat the 4th team, VIK Västerås HK, in the first playoff round, but lost in the next round to IF Björklöven.

In the 2007/08 season the financial situation in the club was really harsh, and a new board of the club fought persistently to get the affairs of the club in order to meet the financial demands for being approved to remain in the league. The team also fought for a long time in the bottom of the league, but finally made a 13th place, nine points ahead of the 15th team Huddinge IK, which then played in the qualification and relegation league and only came in third after two promoted teams from division 1, but would eventually be promoted on the relegation of Nyköping.

However, the financial situation was only solved almost all the way. Since the previous season the financial demands on clubs in Elitserien and HockeyAllsvenskan included the right to have a negative shareholders' equity for one season, but not for two in a row. The club had a negative equity per April 30, 2007, and didn't manage to avoid the same thing also per April 30, 2008, and by these means, they did not meet up to all necessary demands to be approved to participate. The control board for these issues decided on June 11 that Nyköping could not be approved, and the Ice Hockey Association turned down an appeal from the club and decided on relegation on June 26. The club tried an appeal to the Riksidrottsnämnden (RIN), a deciding board within the National Sports Association. The RIN decided on July 17 that there were no formal faults in the decision made by the ice hockey association and that they would not look into the matter at all.

On 15 April 2014, after experiencing financial difficulties for several years, the club went bankrupt and ceased to exist.

=== Season-by-season ===
List of Nyköpings HK seasons
Season	Level	Division	Record		Avg. home atnd.	Notes	Ref.
Season	Level	Division	Position	W-T-L W-OT-L	Avg. home atnd.	Notes	Ref.
2009–10	Tier 3	Division 1D	2nd	16–2–0–4	784		
2009–10	Tier 3	AllEttan Central	4th	6–1–0–7	813		
2009–10	Tier 3	Playoff 1 Playoff 2	— —	1–1–0–0; 0–0–0–2	650; 1,038	vs Visby/Roma HK vs Olofströms IK	
2010–11	Tier 3	Division 1D	2nd	18–0–0–9	714		
2010–11	Tier 3	AllEttan Central	8th	3–0–0–11	565		
2011–12	Tier 3	Division 1D	2nd	16–2–3–6	776		
2011–12	Tier 3	AllEttan Central	1st	10–1–1–2	1,405	Bye to Playoff 3	
2011–12	Tier 3	Playoff 3	—	1–0–1–1	2,529	vs Kallinge-Ronneby IF	
2012–13	Tier 3	Division 1D	2nd	21–1–0–5	908		
2012–13	Tier 3	AllEttan Central	5th	8–0–0–6	1,075		
2013–14	Tier 3	Division 1D	3rd	17–3–1–6	723		
2013–14	Tier 3	AllEttan Central	1st	12–0–0–2	1,306	Bye to Playoff 3	
2013–14	Tier 3	Playoff 3	—	0–0–0–2	2,302	vs Tingsryds AIF	
