= Bodens IK =

- Full name: Bodens ishockeyklubb
- Sport: ice hockey
- Founded: 1987
- Folded: 1 December 2005
- Based in: Boden, Sweden
- Arena: Björknäshallen

Bodens IK is a defunct ice hockey team based in Boden, Sweden. Founded in 1987 out of the Bodens BK ice hockey section, the team operated within HockeyAllsvenskan. During the 1993–1994 season, the club was one penalty shot away from Elitserien against AIK and during the 1994–1995 season the club was one victory away from Elitserien. Also, the club played Kvalserien in 2002.

The club went into bankruptcy on 1 December 2005.
