= IF Troja-Ljungby =

Swedish ice hockey club

- City: Ljungby, Sweden
- League: Men: Hockeyettan; Women: NDHL Damettan
- Division: Södra
- Founded: 22 March 1948
- Home arena: Ljungby Arena (capacity 3620)
- Colours: Red, white
- Head coach: Men: Jens Gustavsson; Women: Martin Lindh
- Website: Official website

IF Troja-Ljungby is an ice hockey club that plays in Ljungby, Sweden at Ljungby Arena. The club was founded as IF Troja on 22 March 1948.

The IF Troja-Ljungby men's representative team currently plays in the Södra ('South') division of the Hockeyettan, the third-highest league in Sweden. The women's representative team plays in the Södra division of the NDHL Damettan, the second-highest league in Sweden.
