= IF Sundsvall Hockey =

- City: Sundsvall, Sweden
- League: Hockeyettan
- Founded: 1976 (1896)
- Home arena: Gärdehov
- Colors: Blue, white, yellow
- Website: www.sundsvallhockey.se/index.php

Franchise history
- 1896–1976: Tunadals Skid och Skridskoförening
- 1976–1985: Sundsvall/Tunadals IF
- 1985–present: IF Sundsvall Hockey

IF Sundsvall Hockey is a Swedish ice hockey club based in Sundsvall. The club currently competes in Hockeyettan, the third tier of ice hockey in Sweden. Sundsvall plays their home matches at Gärdehov, with a capacity of 2,500.

== History ==
The club was founded in 1896 as Tunadals Skid och Skridskoförening (Tundal Ski and Skate Club), which was active mainly in ice skating, but also participated in athletics, association football, and orienteering. Participation in ice hockey wouldn't begin until 1952. In 1976, the club was reorganized as Sundsvall/Tunadals IF, which was later given its current name of IF Sundsvall Hockey in 1985.

Sundsvall has previously spent many years playing in the second-tier of Swedish hockey, but was relegated to the third tier following the 2011–12 HockeyAllsvenskan season.

== Season-by-season ==
Season	Level	Division	Record		Avg. home atnd.	Notes	Ref.
Season	Level	Division	Position	W-T-L W-OT-L	Avg. home atnd.	Notes	Ref.
2009–10	Tier 2	HockeyAllsvenskan	13th	12–7–5–28	886		
2009–10	HockeyAllsvenskan qualifiers		3rd	4–1–2–3	910	Failed to secure a spot in HockeyAllsvenskan for 2010–11 season, but avoided relegation by replacing IF Björklöven, who were relegated due to financial trouble.	
2010–11	Tier 2	HockeyAllsvenskan	12th	11–5–7–29	926		
2011–12	Tier 2	HockeyAllsvenskan	14th	11–7–3–31	1,171		
2011–12	HockeyAllsvenskan qualifiers		5th	4–1–0–5	1,414	▼ Relegated to Division 1	
2012–13	Tier 3	Division 1B	1st	23–4–0–1	670		
2012–13	Tier 3	AllEttan North	2nd	10–1–1–2	1,210	Bye to round 3	
2012–13	Tier 3	Playoff to HA qualifiers	Round 3	1–0–0–2	1,456	Lost 1–2 in games vs Piteå HC	
2013–14	Tier 3	Division 1 North	2nd	32–3–3–6	546	Bye to round 3	
2013–14	Tier 3	Playoff to HA qualifiers	Round 3	0–0–0–2	2,343	Lost 0–2 in games vs KRIF	
2014–15	Tier 3	Hockeyettan North	1st of 11	17–1–2–0	650		
2014–15	Tier 3	Allettan North	1st of 8	2–1–0–11	1,500		
2014–15	HockeyAllsvenskan qualifiers		4th of 6	4–1–1–4	2,047	▲ Promoted to HockeyAllsvenskan in conjunction with the SHL's expansion to 14 teams.	
2015–16	Tier 2	HockeyAllsvenskan	14th of 14	8–7–4–33	1,295		
2015–16	HockeyAllsvenskan qualifiers		4th of 6	3–1–2–4	1,134	▼ Relegated to Hockeyettan	
2016–17	Tier 3	Hockeyettan North	3rd of 12	16–1–0–5	542		
2016–17	Tier 3	Allettan North	3rd of 10	8–5–1–4	693	Bye to round 2	
2016–17	Tier 3	Playoff to HA qualifiers	Round 2	1–0–0–2	1,050	Lost 1–2 in games vs Vimmerby HC	

== Women's side ==
In May 2017, the club eliminated its women's side, despite them having just managed to save their place in the top-flight Swedish Women's Hockey League (SDHL) during the qualification playoffs. The organisation cited a need to save money for its third-tier men's side. The club was criticised for the decision, with forward Mathilda Gustafsson stating that "If we were a company instead of an association, you would never shut down a department which only employed women because the cost inhibits the male employees."
