= 2002–03 Division 1 season (Swedish ice hockey) =

- League: Division 1
- Sport: Ice hockey
- Number of teams: 68
- Promoted to Division 1: Almtuna IS; Tegs SK; Växjö Lakers Hockey
- Relegated to Division 2: Lycksele SK, Svedjeholmens IF, Avesta BK; Nor IK, Söderhamn/Ljusne, Åmåls SK; Hammarö HC, Nacka HK, Mälarhöjden/Bredäng; IFK Salem, Gislaveds SK, Kristianstads IK

Division 1 seasons
- ← 2001–02 2003–04 →

2002–03 was the fourth season that Division 1 functioned as the third-level of ice hockey in Sweden, below the second-level Allsvenskan and the top-level Elitserien (now the SHL).

== Format ==
The league was divided into four regional groups. In each region, the top teams qualified for the Kvalserien till Allsvenskan, for the opportunity to be promoted to the Allsvenskan. The bottom teams in each group were forced to play in a relegation round against the top teams from Division 2 in order to retain their spot in Division 1 for the following season. These were also conducted within each region.

== Season ==
=== Northern region ===
==== First round ====
===== Group A =====
	Club	GP	W	T	L	GF	GA	Pts
1.	Vännäs HC	14	9	3	2	81	40	21
2.	Tegs SK	14	10	0	4	99	46	20
3.	Clemensnäs HC	14	9	2	3	62	35	20
4.	Asplöven HC	14	8	1	5	72	51	17
5.	Kalix HF	14	8	0	6	52	55	16
6.	Malå IF	14	4	1	9	31	83	9
7.	Älvsby IF	14	3	2	9	39	69	8
8.	Lycksele SK	14	0	1	13	30	110	1

===== Group B =====
	Club	GP	W	T	L	GF	GA	Pts
1.	Östersunds IK	18	13	1	4	112	56	27
2.	Husum Hockey	18	13	1	4	93	72	27
3.	Sollefteå HK	18	12	2	4	76	46	26
4.	Brunflo IK	18	11	2	5	79	57	24
5.	AIK Härnösand	18	10	3	5	81	54	23
6.	LN 91	18	6	2	10	60	73	14
7.	Kramfors	18	6	0	12	64	89	12
8.	Bräcke IK	18	5	1	12	51	100	11
9.	Kovlands IF	18	4	2	12	65	88	10
10.	Svedjeholmens IF	18	2	2	14	47	93	6

==== Allettan ====
	Club	GP	W	T	L	GF	GA	Pts
1.	Tegs SK	14	9	3	2	70	46	21
2.	Asplöven HC	14	9	2	3	79	49	20
3.	Östersunds IK	14	8	2	4	64	48	18
4.	Brunflo IK	14	7	2	5	61	42	16
5.	Clemensnäs HC	14	6	2	6	60	50	14
6.	Sollefteå HK	14	5	1	8	45	67	11
7.	Vännäs HC	14	4	2	8	50	66	10
8.	Husum Hockey	14	0	2	12	40	101	2

==== Qualification round ====
===== Group A =====
	Club	GP	W	T	L	GF	GA	Pts
1.	Malå IF	10	7	0	3	51	43	17
2.	Älvsby IF	10	7	0	3	41	37	16
3.	Kalix HF	10	5	1	4	41	33	15
4.	Brooklyn Tigers	10	5	1	4	41	37	11
5.	Lycksele SK	10	2	1	7	36	46	6
6.	Medle SK	10	1	3	6	34	48	5

===== Group B =====
	Club	GP	W	T	L	GF	GA	Pts
1.	Bräcke IK	14	12	0	2	70	35	27
2.	AIK Härnösand	14	9	2	3	82	40	26
3.	Kovlands IF	14	8	3	3	62	38	21
4.	LN 91	14	6	1	7	47	51	18
5.	Svedjeholmens IF	14	7	1	6	50	42	16
6.	Kramfors	14	5	1	8	52	60	15
7.	Njurunda SK	14	5	0	9	45	62	10
8.	KB 65	14	0	0	14	22	108	0

==== Playoffs ====
===== First round =====
- Malå IF - Asplöven HC 3:5/0:5
- Bräcke IK - Östersunds IK 0:6/1:4

===== Second round =====
- Östersunds IK - Asplöven HC 3:5/1:4

==== Relegation ====
===== Group A =====
- The Brooklyn Tigers and Kalix HF qualified for the league.

===== Group B =====
	Club	GP	W	T	L	GF	GA	Pts
1.	Kramfors	6	6	0	0	41	10	12
2.	Svedjeholmens IF	6	4	0	2	31	21	8
3.	Njurunda SK	6	2	0	4	18	25	4
4.	Ånge IK	6	0	0	6	12	46	0

=== Western region ===
==== First round ====
===== Group A =====
	Club	GP	W	T	L	GF	GA	Pts
1.	Borlänge HF	20	13	3	4	116	65	29
2.	Skutskärs SK	20	11	6	3	87	61	28
3.	Valbo AIF	20	12	3	5	80	51	27
4.	Surahammars IF	20	10	6	4	99	66	26
5.	Hedemora SK	20	12	1	7	98	80	25
6.	Hudiksvalls HC	20	9	5	6	77	72	23
7.	Hille/Åbyggeby IK	20	5	8	7	90	99	18
8.	Smedjebacken HC	20	6	2	12	81	101	14
9.	Västerås HC	20	5	4	11	64	90	14
10.	Söderhamn/Ljusne	20	6	2	12	55	86	14
11.	Avesta BK	20	0	2	18	41	117	2

===== Group B =====
	Club	GP	W	T	L	GF	GA	Pts
1.	Sunne IK	20	18	1	1	109	37	37
2.	IFK Hallsberg	20	15	0	5	90	50	30
3.	IFK Kumla	20	14	0	6	77	40	28
4.	Grums IK	20	11	4	5	91	61	26
5.	IK Viking	20	10	1	9	79	70	21
6.	Skåre BK	20	8	4	8	79	67	20
7.	Karlskoga HC	20	7	2	11	69	89	16
8.	Åmåls SK	20	5	3	12	66	107	13
9.	Arvika HC	20	3	5	12	69	119	11
10.	Hammarö HC	20	4	2	14	57	91	10
11.	Nor IK	20	4	0	16	48	103	8

==== Allettan ====
	Club	GP	W	T	L	GF	GA	Pts
1.	Sunne IK	14	13	0	1	66	27	26
2.	Grums IK	14	9	1	4	72	44	19
3.	Skutskärs SK	14	5	5	4	55	43	15
4.	IFK Kumla	14	6	2	6	42	39	14
5.	IFK Hallsberg	14	5	2	7	45	55	12
6.	Surahammars IF	14	4	3	7	49	68	11
7.	Borlänge HF	14	3	2	9	46	72	8
8.	Valbo AIF	14	2	3	9	37	64	7

==== Qualification round ====
===== Group A =====
	Club	GP	W	T	L	GF	GA	Pts (Bonus)
1.	Hedemora SK	12	9	2	1	55	36	26(6)
2.	Hille/Åbyggeby IK	12	5	5	2	59	42	19(4)
3.	Hudiksvalls HC	12	6	2	4	47	45	19(5)
4.	Västerås HC	12	4	4	4	39	36	14(2)
5.	Smedjebacken HC	12	4	0	8	40	57	11(3)
6.	Söderhamn/Ljusne	12	1	6	5	39	45	9(1)
7.	Avesta BK	12	3	1	8	37	55	7(0)

===== Group B =====
	Club	GP	W	T	L	GF	GA	Pts (Bonus)
1.	IK Viking	12	9	1	2	72	30	25(6)
2.	Skåre BK	12	6	1	5	53	48	18(5)
3.	Karlskoga HC	12	5	3	4	58	46	17(4)
4.	Arvika HC	12	6	3	3	51	52	17(2)
5.	Hammarö HC	12	5	3	4	42	50	14(1)
6.	Åmåls SK	12	3	4	5	43	44	13(1)
7.	Nor IK	12	0	1	11	20	69	1(0)

==== Final round ====
===== Group A =====
	Club	GP	W	T	L	GF	GA	Pts
1.	Sunne IK	6	5	0	1	27	11	10
2.	IFK Kumla	6	5	0	1	24	12	10
3.	IK Viking	6	1	0	5	11	22	2
4.	IFK Hallsberg	6	1	0	5	10	27	2

===== Group B =====
	Club	GP	W	T	L	GF	GA	Pts
1.	Grums IK	6	3	1	2	23	21	7
2.	Skutskärs SK	6	3	1	2	22	24	7
3.	Hedemora SK	6	3	0	3	25	20	6
4.	Surahammars IF	6	2	0	4	20	25	4

==== Relegation ====
===== Group A =====
	Club	GP	W	T	L	GF	GA	Pts
1.	Falu IF	6	5	1	0	35	12	11
2.	Smedjebacken HC	6	3	0	3	25	25	6
3.	IF Noretpojkarna	6	2	1	3	25	28	5
4.	Söderhamn/Ljusne	6	1	0	5	17	37	2

===== Group B =====
	Club	GP	W	T	L	GF	GA	Pts
1.	Köping Hockey	6	3	2	1	17	15	8
2.	Forshaga IF	6	3	1	2	21	19	7
3.	Åmåls SK	6	3	0	3	21	19	6
4.	Hammarö HC	6	1	1	4	16	22	3

=== Eastern region ===
==== First round ====
===== Group A =====
	Club	GP	W	T	L	GF	GA	Pts
1.	Almtuna IS	14	13	0	1	86	27	26
2.	Tierps IF	14	8	1	5	43	29	17
3.	Järfälla HC	14	8	0	6	49	39	16
4.	Uppsala Hockey	14	6	3	5	49	57	15
5.	Väsby IK	14	5	2	7	49	52	12
6.	Arlanda HC	14	4	2	8	37	53	10
7.	Gimo IF	14	3	3	8	42	73	9
8.	Skå IK	14	2	3	9	38	63	7

===== Group B =====
	Club	GP	W	T	L	GF	GA	Pts
1.	Botkyrka HC	14	7	6	1	50	28	20
2.	Trångsund	14	5	6	3	56	44	16
3.	Gnesta IK	14	5	5	4	47	40	15
4.	Linden HC	14	6	3	5	44	43	15
5.	Mälarhöjden/Bredäng	14	7	1	6	54	63	15
6.	Värmdö HC	14	4	4	6	50	60	12
7.	Nacka HK	14	4	2	8	40	49	10
8.	IKF Salem	14	3	3	8	43	57	9

==== Allettan ====
	Club	GP	W	T	L	GF	GA	Pts
1.	Almtuna IS	21	18	1	2	114	40	37
2.	Botkyrka HC	21	13	5	3	92	62	31
3.	Tierps IF	21	12	3	6	75	40	27
4.	Järfälla HC	21	10	3	8	65	59	23
5.	Uppsala Hockey	21	8	4	9	74	83	20
6.	Linden HC	21	5	3	13	38	79	13
7.	Gnesta IK	21	3	3	15	43	95	9
8.	Trångsund	21	3	2	16	65	108	8

===== Qualification round =====
	Club	GP	W	T	L	GF	GA	Pts
1.	Arlanda HC	21	10	5	6	97	60	25
2.	Väsby IK	21	10	5	6	97	61	25
3.	Skå IK	21	11	2	8	104	89	24
4.	Värmdo HC	21	10	4	7	88	80	24
5.	Gimo IF	21	9	3	9	75	92	21
6.	Nacka HK	21	9	1	11	88	93	19
7.	Mälarhöjden/Bredäng	21	9	1	11	72	102	19
8.	IFK Salem	21	3	5	13	64	108	11

===== Final round =====
	Club	GP	W	T	L	GF	GA	Pts
1.	Botkyrka HC	6	4	1	1	23	13	9
2.	Tierps IF	6	4	0	2	21	13	8
3.	Arlanda Wings	6	2	2	2	18	19	6
4.	Järfälla HC	6	0	1	5	13	30	1

===== Relegation =====
	Club	GP	W	T	L	GF	GA	Pts
1.	Skå IK	6	3	2	1	27	16	8
2.	Värmdö HC	6	4	0	2	17	23	8
3.	Haninge HF	6	2	3	1	26	18	7
4.	Sollentuna HC	6	0	1	5	15	28	1

=== Southern region ===
==== First round ====
	Club	GP	W	T	L	GF	GA	Pts
1.	Växjö Lakers Hockey	44	34	7	3	240	94	75
2.	Tingsryds AIF	44	21	10	13	165	128	52
3.	Skövde IK	44	23	6	15	141	111	52
4.	Borås HC	44	21	7	16	175	125	49
5.	Mariestads BoIS	44	20	8	16	154	144	48
6.	Hästen Hockey	44	21	5	18	155	135	47
7.	Tyringe SoSS	44	19	5	20	149	163	43
8.	Jonstorps IF	44	20	3	21	161	176	43
9.	IK Pantern	44	16	5	23	142	172	37
10.	Kristianstads IK	44	14	8	22	149	172	36
11.	Mölndals IF	44	12	6	26	114	179	30
12.	Gislaveds SK	44	6	4	34	98	244	16

==== Final round ====
===== Group A =====
	Club	GP	W	T	L	GF	GA	Pts
1.	Växjö Lakers Hockey	6	6	0	0	40	12	12
2.	Borås HC	6	3	0	3	20	18	6
3.	Hästen Hockey	6	1	1	4	18	26	3
4.	Tyringe SoSS	6	1	1	4	15	37	3

===== Group B =====
	Club	GP	W	T	L	GF	GA	Pts
1.	Mariestads BoIS	6	4	1	1	21	17	9
2.	Tingsryds AIF	6	3	1	2	20	15	7
3.	Skövde IK	6	3	0	3	18	13	6
4.	Jonstrop IK	6	0	2	4	12	26	2

==== Relegation ====
===== Group A =====
	Club	GP	W	T	L	GF	GA	Pts
1.	Trollhättan	10	9	0	1	51	31	18
2.	Mölndals IF	10	5	1	4	48	34	11
3.	Nittorps IK	10	4	3	3	26	31	11
4.	HK Kungsbacka	10	5	0	5	41	39	10
5.	Gislaveds SK	10	4	1	5	38	38	9
6.	Göteborgs IK	10	0	1	9	22	53	1

===== Group B =====
	Club	GP	W	T	L	GF	GA	Pts
1.	IK Pantern	10	7	1	2	51	26	15
2.	Olofströms IK	10	7	0	3	42	31	14
3.	Osby IK	10	5	2	3	40	31	12
4.	Kristianstads IK	10	5	1	4	39	29	11
5.	Vimmerby Hockey	10	2	3	5	25	45	7
6.	Helsingborgs HC	10	0	1	9	17	52	1
