= 2003–04 Division 1 season (Swedish ice hockey) =

- League: Division 1
- Sport: Ice hockey
- Number of teams: 62
- Promoted to Division 1: Uppsala HC; Skövde IK
- Relegated to Division 2: Malmbergets AIF, Sollefteå HK, Kramfors, Svedjeholmens IF; Bräcke IK, AIK Härnösand, Överkalix IF, Hedemora SK; Smedjebacken HC, Västerås HC, IK Viking, Arvika HC; Hudiksvalls HC, IFK Hallsberg, Karlskoga HC

Division 1 seasons
- ← 2002–03 2004–05 →

2003–04 was the fifth season that Division 1 functioned as the third-level of ice hockey in Sweden, below the second-level Allsvenskan and the top-level Elitserien (now the SHL).

== Format ==
The league was divided into four regional groups. In each region, the top teams qualified for the Kvalserien till Allsvenskan, for the opportunity to be promoted to the Allsvenskan. The bottom teams in each group were forced to play in a relegation round against the top teams from Division 2 in order to retain their spot in Division 1 for the following season. These were also conducted within each region.

== Season ==
=== Northern region ===
==== First round ====
===== Group A =====
	Club	GP	W	T	L	GF	GA	Pts
1.	Kiruna IF	14	10	2	2	58	33	22
2.	Asplöven HC	14	10	2	2	64	41	22
3.	Älvsby IF	14	7	3	4	47	42	17
4.	Clemensnäs HC	14	7	1	6	63	47	15
5.	Vännäs HC	14	6	3	5	56	51	15
6.	Brooklyn HC	14	6	1	7	51	44	13
7.	Malmbergets AIF	14	2	1	11	36	88	5
8.	Överkalix IF	14	1	1	12	28	67	3

===== Group B =====
	Club	GP	W	T	L	GF	GA	Pts
1.	Jämtland Hockey	18	15	2	1	112	46	32
2.	Brunflo IK	18	11	3	4	75	55	25
3.	Husum Hockey	18	8	7	3	82	64	23
4.	Kovlands IF	18	8	3	7	66	50	19
5.	Kramfors	18	8	3	7	62	66	19
6.	LN 91	18	7	3	8	73	54	17
7.	Bräcke IK	18	8	1	9	61	76	17
8.	AIK Härnösand	18	7	2	9	62	74	16
9.	Sollefteå HK	18	4	2	12	54	82	10
10.	Svedjeholmens IF	18	1	0	17	52	132	2

==== Allettan ====
	Club	GP	W	T	L	GF	GA	Pts
1.	Asplöven HC	14	10	2	2	63	31	22
2.	Jämtland Hockey	14	9	2	3	58	35	20
3.	Kovlands IF	14	7	3	4	59	50	17
4.	Brunflo IK	14	7	2	5	55	42	16
5.	Husum Hockey	14	5	4	5	47	48	14
6.	Kiruna IF	14	5	3	6	46	55	13
7.	Clemensnäs HC	14	2	2	10	34	62	6
8.	Älvsby IF	14	1	2	11	31	70	4

==== Playoffs ====
===== First round =====
- Husum Hockey – Jämtland Hockey 2:5/0:4
- Brunflo IK – Kovlands IF 5:3/4:5

===== Second round =====
- Jämtland Hockey – Brunflo IK 3:3/1:2

==== Relegation ====
===== Group A =====
	Club	GP	W	T	L	GF	GA	Pts
1.	Vännäs HC	10	9	0	1	56	23	18
2.	Storfors AIK	10	7	1	2	49	34	15
3.	Brooklyn HC	10	5	2	3	57	40	12
4.	Överkalix IF	10	5	0	5	44	53	10
5.	Malmbergets AIF	10	1	1	8	31	65	3
6.	Bolidens FFI	10	0	2	8	27	49	2

===== Group B =====
	Club	GP	W	T	L	GF	GA	Pts
1.	LN 91	14	11	1	2	63	21	23
2.	AIK Härnösand	14	10	1	3	76	36	21
3.	Bräcke IK	14	9	2	3	85	43	20
4.	Sollefteå HK	14	7	0	7	51	51	14
5.	Kramfors	14	5	3	6	40	45	13
6.	IFK Strömsund	14	3	4	7	49	69	10
7.	Svedjeholmens IF	14	3	2	9	38	60	8
8.	Järveds IF	14	1	1	12	29	106	3

==== Qualification round ====
	Club	GP	W	T	L	GF	GA	Pts
1.	Brooklyn HC	6	4	1	1	18	6	9
2.	Bräcke IK	6	4	0	2	26	23	8
3.	AIK Härnösand	6	3	0	3	21	18	6
4.	Överkalix IF	6	0	1	5	15	33	1

=== Western region ===
==== First round ====
===== Group A =====
	Club	GP	W	T	L	GF	GA	Pts
1.	Borlänge HF	18	15	1	2	84	46	31
2.	Hille/Åbyggeby IK	18	13	0	5	94	47	26
3.	Valbo AIF	18	10	2	6	75	46	22
4.	Surahammars IF	18	10	2	6	69	55	22
5.	Falu IF	18	10	2	6	66	68	22
6.	Skutskärs SK	18	8	4	6	72	63	20
7.	Hudiksvalls HC	18	9	1	8	71	64	19
8.	Hedemora SK	18	2	4	12	62	91	8
9.	Smedjebacken HC	18	2	2	14	48	110	6
10.	Västerås HC	18	1	2	15	51	102	4

===== Group B =====
	Club	GP	W	T	L	GF	GA	Pts
1.	Sunne IK	18	15	1	2	117	39	31
2.	IFK Kumla	18	13	1	4	84	44	27
3.	Skåre BK	18	11	1	6	78	65	23
4.	Grums IK	18	9	3	6	75	82	21
5.	Forshaga IF	18	8	1	9	80	77	17
6.	IFK Hallsberg	18	7	2	9	62	64	16
7.	Köping HC	18	6	3	9	67	78	15
8.	IK Viking	18	6	1	11	50	72	13
9.	Arvika HC	18	4	2	12	56	105	10
10.	Karlskoga HC	18	2	3	13	45	88	7

==== Allettan ====
	Club	GP	W	T	L	GF	GA	Pts
1.	Skåre BK	14	10	1	3	62	44	21
2.	IFK Kumla	14	8	4	2	58	33	20
3.	Borlänge HF	14	8	3	3	69	49	19
4.	Sunne IK	14	8	0	6	61	48	16
5.	Valbo AIF	14	7	2	5	49	41	16
6.	Surahammars IF	14	4	2	8	48	61	10
7.	Hille/Åbyggeby IK	14	4	0	10	51	69	8
8.	Grums IK	14	1	0	13	31	84	2

==== Final round ====
	Club	GP	W	T	L	GF	GA	Pts
1.	IFK Kumla	6	4	1	1	18	10	11
2.	Skåre BK	6	1	3	2	15	21	8
3.	Sunne IK	6	3	1	2	18	12	7
4.	Borlänge HF	6	0	3	3	15	23	4

==== Relegation ====
===== Group A =====
	Club	GP	W	T	L	GF	GA	Pts (Bonus)
1.	Skutskärs SK	15	12	0	3	74	46	28(4)
2.	Falu IF	15	10	1	4	76	38	26(5)
3.	Hudiksvalls HC	15	11	0	4	73	50	25(3)
4.	Hedemora SK	15	4	1	10	54	76	11(2)
5.	Smedjebacken HC	15	4	0	11	52	74	9(1)
6.	Västerås HC	15	2	2	11	37	82	6(0)

===== Group B =====
	Club	GP	W	T	L	GF	GA	Pts (Bonus)
1.	Forshaga IF	12	8	2	2	47	21	23(5)
2.	IFK Hallsberg	12	6	4	2	39	20	20(4)
3.	Karlskoga HC	12	7	2	3	48	44	17(1)
4.	IK Viking	12	4	1	7	37	54	12(3)
5.	Arvika HC	12	0	1	11	29	61	1(2)

===== Qualification =====
- Alfta – Hudiksvalls HC 4:3/4:6
- Hammarö – Karlskoga HC 5:3/3:6

==== Qualification round ====
	Club	GP	W	T	L	GF	GA	Pts
1.	Falu IF	10	7	2	1	49	24	16
2.	Forshaga IF	10	7	2	1	46	25	16
3.	Skutskärs SK	10	4	2	4	30	30	10
4.	Hudiksvalls HC	10	3	3	4	41	46	9
5.	IFK Hallsberg	10	4	0	6	38	46	8
6.	Karlskoga HC	10	0	1	9	24	57	1

=== Eastern region ===
==== First round ====
	Club	GP	W	T	L	GF	GA	Pts
1.	Uppsala Hockey	33	26	2	5	148	73	54
2.	Botkyrka HC	33	19	5	9	129	92	43
3.	Väsby IK	33	18	2	13	120	107	38
4.	Järfälla HC	33	16	4	13	104	103	36
5.	Trångsunds IF	33	16	3	14	110	92	35
6.	Arlanda HC	33	17	0	16	137	142	34
7.	Värmdö HC	33	13	5	15	96	109	31
8.	Linden Hockey	33	13	3	17	116	120	29
9.	Haninge Hockey	33	11	7	15	105	115	29
10.	Sollentuna HC	33	11	3	19	94	134	25
11.	Tierp Hockey	33	10	3	20	89	108	23
12.	Skå IK	33	7	5	21	86	139	19

==== Final round ====
	Club	GP	W	T	L	GF	GA	Pts
1.	Botkyrka HC	6	4	1	1	23	13	9
2.	Väsby IK	6	4	0	2	21	13	8
3.	Trångsunds IF	6	2	2	2	18	19	6
4.	Järfälla HC	6	0	1	5	13	30	1

==== Relegation ====
	Club	GP	W	T	L	GF	GA	Pts
1.	Sollentuna HC	10	6	3	1	41	26	15
2.	Tierp Hockey	10	7	0	3	46	28	14
3.	Enköpings SK	10	5	3	2	56	32	13
4.	Flemingsbergs IF	10	5	0	5	43	32	10
5.	Spånga HC	10	2	3	5	33	44	7
6.	IFK Salem	10	0	1	9	27	84	1

=== Southern region ===
==== First round ====
	Club	GP	W	T	L	GF	GA	Pts
1.	Tingsryds AIF	32	21	6	5	149	83	48
2.	Skövde IK	32	22	3	7	137	73	47
3.	Borås HC	32	21	4	7	130	88	46
4.	IK Pantern	32	16	7	9	100	85	39
5.	Mariestads BoIS	32	16	6	10	122	95	38
6.	Tranås AIF	32	15	5	12	120	106	35
7.	Tyringe SoSS	32	10	7	15	115	117	27
8.	Olofströms IK	32	10	7	15	81	99	27
9.	IK Hästen	32	10	6	16	102	113	26
10.	Jonstorps IF	32	8	7	17	99	123	23
11.	Osby IK	32	7	5	20	98	141	19
12.	Tvåstad Cobras	32	3	3	26	58	188	9

==== Final round ====
===== Group A =====
	Club	GP	W	T	L	GF	GA	Pts
1.	Borås HC	6	5	0	1	27	11	10
2.	Tingsryds AIF	6	4	0	2	29	20	6
3.	Tyringe SoSS	6	3	0	3	24	34	6
4.	Tranås AIF	6	0	0	6	16	31	6

===== Group B =====
	Club	GP	W	T	L	GF	GA	Pts
1.	Skövde IK	6	4	1	1	19	11	9
2.	Mariestads BoIS	6	3	1	2	19	16	7
3.	IK Pantern	6	3	1	2	16	14	7
4.	Olofströms IK	6	0	1	5	6	19	6

==== Relegation ====
===== Group A =====
	Club	GP	W	T	L	GF	GA	Pts
1.	Mölndals IF	10	8	2	0	47	24	18
2.	IK Hästen	10	6	2	2	46	33	14
3.	Motala AIF	10	4	2	4	26	25	10
4.	Nittorps IK	10	3	2	5	23	29	8
5.	Vimmerby Hockey	10	3	2	5	26	36	8
6.	Ulricehamns IF	10	1	0	9	25	46	2

===== Group B =====
	Club	GP	W	T	L	GF	GA	Pts
1.	Jonstorps IF	10	10	0	0	60	25	20
2.	Osby IK	10	8	0	2	51	28	16
3.	Kallinge-Ronneby IF	10	3	3	4	33	41	9
4.	Gislaveds SK	10	3	2	5	32	36	8
5.	Värnamo GIK	10	1	2	7	28	60	4
6.	Kristianstads IK	10	1	1	8	36	50	3
