= 2000–01 Division 1 season (Swedish ice hockey) =

- League: Division 1
- Sport: Ice hockey
- Number of teams: 73
- Promoted to Division 1: Huddinge IK; Almtuna IS; Halmstad HC; HC Örebro 90
- Relegated to Division 2: Husum, Österåkers IK, Sudrets HC, Tibro IK, Kungälvs IK, Grästorps IK, Alvesta SK, Boro-Vetlanda HC

Division 1 seasons
- ← 1999–2000 2001–02 →

2000–01 was the second season that Division 1 functioned as the third-level of ice hockey in Sweden, below the second-level Allsvenskan and the top-level Elitserien (now the SHL).

== Format ==
The league was divided into four regional groups. In each region, the top teams qualified for the Kvalserien till Allsvenskan, for the opportunity to be promoted to the Allsvenskan. The bottom teams in each group were forced to play in a relegation round against the top teams from Division 2 in order to retain their spot in Division 1 for the following season. These were also conducted within each region.

== Season ==
=== Northern region ===
==== First round ====
===== Group A =====
	Club	GP	W	T	L	GF	GA	Pts
1.	Clemensnäs HC	28	22	3	3	184	79	47
2.	Tegs SK	28	17	4	7	158	105	38
3.	Vännäs HC	28	16	5	7	156	110	37
4.	SK Lejon	28	14	6	8	111	87	34
5.	Kalix HF	28	12	3	13	137	129	27
6.	Överkalix IF	28	7	5	16	99	134	19
7.	Lycksele SK	28	4	3	21	70	162	11
8.	Tuolluvaara IF	28	4	3	21	68	177	11

===== Group B =====
	Club	GP	W	T	L	GF	GA	Pts
1.	Örnsköldsviks SK	27	20	5	2	143	85	45
2.	AIK Härnösand	27	15	7	5	119	70	37
3.	Kovland	27	13	5	9	125	124	31
4.	KB 65	27	10	6	11	100	92	26
5.	Kramfors	27	10	5	12	107	111	25
6.	Östersunds IK	27	9	5	13	84	98	23
7.	Brunflo IK	27	8	7	12	89	109	23
8.	Svedjeholmen	27	8	7	12	75	98	23
9.	LN 91	27	7	6	14	94	102	20
10.	Husum	27	6	5	16	93	140	17

==== Playoffs ====
- Clemensnäs HC - AIK Härnösand 5:5/4:5
- Örnsköldsviks SK defeated Tegs SK

==== Relegation ====
	Club	GP	W	T	L	GF	GA	Pts
1.	Sollefteå	6	4	0	2	29	19	8
2.	LN 91	6	3	1	2	28	20	7
3.	Husum	6	3	1	2	25	24	7
4.	Njurunda SK	6	1	0	5	14	33	2

=== Western region ===
==== First round ====
===== Group A =====
	Club	GP	W	T	L	GF	GA	Pts
1.	Borlänge HF	18	13	3	2	80	40	29
2.	Valbo AIF	18	11	5	2	88	43	27
3.	Surahammars IF	18	12	3	3	91	50	27
4.	Skutskärs SK	18	9	4	5	87	55	22
5.	Hedemora SK	18	9	1	8	69	64	19
6.	Hille/Åbyggeby IK	18	8	2	8	68	56	18
7.	Avesta BK	18	7	3	8	68	59	17
8.	Hudiksvalls HC	18	6	1	11	60	90	13
9.	Västerås HC	18	2	2	14	54	113	6
10.	Hofors HC	18	1	0	17	36	131	2

===== Group B =====
	Club	GP	W	T	L	GF	GA	Pts
1.	HC Örebro	18	16	0	2	97	25	32
2.	Sunne IK	18	13	2	3	120	53	28
3.	Arvika HC	18	12	2	4	96	53	26
4.	Grums IK	18	11	2	5	90	51	24
5.	Skåre BK	18	9	3	6	84	64	21
6.	Åmåls SK	18	6	4	8	63	66	16
7.	Hammarö HC	18	4	4	10	58	92	12
8.	Kristinehamns HT	18	4	4	10	54	109	12
9.	Forshaga IF	18	2	1	15	38	104	5
10.	Nor IK	18	1	2	15	39	122	4

==== Allettan ====
	Club	GP	W	T	L	GF	GA	Pts
1.	HC Örebro	14	9	2	3	56	30	20
2.	Grums IK	14	7	4	3	57	47	18
3.	Sunne IK	14	8	2	4	47	37	18
4.	Skutskärs SK	14	7	1	6	42	48	15
5.	Surahammars IF	14	5	3	6	49	50	13
6.	Arvika HC	14	6	1	7	52	54	13
7.	Valbo AIK	14	4	2	8	49	63	10
8.	Borlänge HF	14	2	1	11	42	65	5

==== Qualification round ====
===== Group A =====
	Club	GP	W	T	L	GF	GA	Pts (Bonus)
1.	Hille/Åbyggeby IK	15	11	1	3	78	47	27(4)
2.	Avesta BK	15	9	3	3	55	33	24(3)
3.	Hedemora SK	15	7	2	6	60	59	21(5)
4.	Västerås HC	15	5	5	5	53	59	16(1)
5.	Hudiksvalls HC	15	3	5	7	50	61	13(2)
6.	Hofors HC	15	1	2	12	38	75	4(0)

===== Group B =====
	Club	GP	W	T	L	GF	GA	Pts (Bonus)
1.	Skåre BK	15	12	1	2	103	40	30(5)
2.	Åmåls SK	15	9	2	4	64	45	24(4)
3.	Hammarö HC	15	8	3	4	70	61	22(3)
4.	Kristinehamns HT	15	6	2	7	67	79	16(2)
5.	Forshaga IF	15	3	0	12	39	79	7(1)
6.	Nor IK	15	2	2	11	39	78	6(0)

==== Final round ====
===== Group A =====
	Club	GP	W	T	L	GF	GA	Pts
1.	HC Örebro	6	4	1	1	25	15	9
2.	Sunne IK	6	3	1	2	35	15	7
3.	Surahammars IF	6	2	2	2	23	23	6
4.	Skåre BK	6	1	0	5	13	43	2

===== Group B =====
	Club	GP	W	T	L	GF	GA	Pts
1.	Grums IK	6	4	2	0	31	18	10
2.	Hille/Åbyggeby IK	6	4	1	1	25	14	9
3.	Arvika HC	6	2	1	3	23	25	5
4.	Skutskärs SK	6	0	0	6	12	34	0

==== Relegation ====
===== Group A =====
	Club	GP	W	T	L	GF	GA	Pts
1.	Hudiksvalls HC	6	3	2	1	23	17	8
2.	Falu HC	6	3	1	2	34	23	7
3.	Björbo IF	6	3	0	3	28	25	6
4.	Hofors HC	6	1	1	4	14	34	3

===== Group B =====
	Club	GP	W	T	L	GF	GA	Pts
1.	Våsteras IK	6	5	1	0	29	5	11
2.	IFK Hallsberg	6	4	0	2	21	16	8
3.	Nor IK	6	1	1	4	8	23	3
4.	Forshaga IF	6	1	0	5	15	29	2

=== Eastern region ===
==== First round ====
===== Group A =====
	Club	GP	W	T	L	GF	GA	Pts
1.	Almtuna IS	28	19	3	6	174	80	41
2.	Järfälla HC	28	16	6	6	116	76	38
3.	Arlanda HC	28	16	5	7	145	84	37
4.	Väsby IK	28	13	7	8	105	81	33
5.	IK Waxholm	28	12	4	12	110	122	28
6.	Gimo IF	28	8	5	15	86	138	21
7.	IFK Österåker	28	5	5	18	76	157	15
8.	Sudrets HC	28	2	7	19	68	142	11

===== Group B =====
	Club	GP	W	T	L	GF	GA	Pts
1.	Mälarhöjden/Bredäng	28	24	2	2	162	48	50
2.	Huddinge IK	28	22	2	4	153	65	46
3.	IK Tälje	28	16	3	9	121	87	35
4.	Trångsund IF	28	14	2	12	104	107	30
5.	Tumba-Botkyrka	28	10	4	14	88	102	24
6.	Skå IK	28	7	2	19	90	153	16
7.	Nacka HK	28	6	3	19	78	129	15
8.	Eskilstuna WHT	28	4	0	24	72	177	8

==== Allettan ====
	Club	GP	W	T	L	GF	GA	Pts
1.	Almtuna IS	14	11	0	3	62	38	22
2.	Huddinge IK	14	10	1	3	64	38	21
3.	Mälarhöjden/Bredäng	14	10	1	3	66	26	21
4.	Väsby IK	14	6	1	7	55	62	13
5.	IK Tälje	14	6	0	8	46	60	12
6.	Arlanda HC	14	4	3	7	61	69	11
7.	Trångsund IF	14	3	2	9	42	64	8
8.	Järfälla HC	14	1	2	11	34	73	4

===== Qualification round =====
	Club	GP	W	T	L	GF	GA	Pts
1.	Tumba-Botkyrka	14	10	3	1	85	51	23
2.	Nacka HK	14	10	2	2	64	33	22
3.	Skå IK	14	7	2	5	58	48	16
4.	Eskilstuna WHT	14	7	1	6	51	59	15
5.	Gimo IF	14	6	2	6	68	59	14
6.	IK Waxholm	14	4	2	8	55	56	10
7.	Österåkers IK	14	3	0	11	39	70	6
8.	Sudrets HC	14	3	0	11	40	84	6

===== Relegation =====
	Club	GP	W	T	L	GF	GA	Pts
1.	Gnesta IK	8	5	2	1	32	26	12
2.	Haninge	8	4	0	4	30	26	8
3.	IFK Salem	8	3	2	3	31	37	8
4.	Österåkers IK	8	3	0	5	31	33	6
5.	Sudrets HC	8	2	2	4	27	29	6

=== Southern region ===
==== First round ====
===== Group A =====
	Club	GP	W	T	L	GF	GA	Pts
1.	Mariestads BoIS	18	14	1	3	90	49	29
2.	Hästen Hockey	18	13	2	3	79	30	28
3.	Borås HC	18	12	1	5	94	51	25
4.	Skövde IK	18	12	0	6	80	54	24
5.	Vänersborg HC	18	9	2	7	62	66	20
6.	Nittorps IK	18	8	2	8	75	68	18
7.	HK Kings	18	7	1	10	52	76	15
8.	Södra Hockey	18	6	1	11	54	65	13
9.	HC Dalen	18	4	0	14	58	85	8
10.	Kungälvs IK	18	0	0	18	28	128	0

===== Group B =====
	Club	GP	W	T	L	GF	GA	Pts
1.	Tyringe SoSS	16	8	5	3	67	39	21
2.	Halmstads HK	16	8	5	3	62	35	21
3.	IK Pantern	16	9	2	5	57	41	20
4.	Nybro Vikings IF	16	8	3	5	66	44	19
5.	Olofströms IK	16	8	2	6	56	58	18
6.	Kristianstads IK	16	7	2	7	54	47	16
7.	Limhamn HC	16	6	3	7	47	56	15
8.	Jonstorps IF	16	4	3	9	64	73	11
9.	Alvesta SK	16	1	1	14	31	111	3

==== Allettan ====
	Club	GP	W	T	L	GF	GA	Pts
1.	Halmstads HK	14	8	4	2	56	32	20
2.	Borås HC	14	8	3	3	57	33	19
3.	Nybro Vikings IF	14	8	1	5	55	37	17
4.	IK Pantern	14	8	0	6	49	49	16
5.	Skövde IK	14	5	3	6	47	56	13
6.	Hästen Hockey	14	4	3	7	33	44	11
7.	Tyringe SoSS	14	3	3	8	34	44	9
8.	Mariestads BoIS	14	3	1	10	26	62	7

==== Qualification round ====
===== Group A =====
	Club	GP	W	T	L	GF	GA	Pts
1.	Mjölby Hockey	14	9	3	2	58	31	21
2.	Nittorps IK	14	9	2	3	70	36	20
3.	Vänersborgs HC	14	9	0	5	53	41	18
4.	HK Kings	14	8	1	5	49	45	17
5.	Kungälvs IK	14	5	1	8	37	67	11
6.	Partille Hockey	14	4	2	8	43	69	10
7.	Grästorps IK	14	4	0	10	43	61	8
8.	Tibro IK	14	3	1	10	48	61	7

===== Group B =====
	Club	GP	W	T	L	GF	GA	Pts
1.	Växjö Lakers Hockey	14	11	1	2	76	36	23
2.	Olofströms IK	14	11	0	3	62	39	22
3.	Kristianstads IK	14	9	0	5	59	40	18
4.	Limhamn HC	14	8	1	5	54	42	17
5.	Jonstorps IF	14	6	1	7	64	69	13
6.	Boro-Vetlanda HC	14	5	2	7	52	63	12
7.	HC Dalen	14	2	0	12	40	71	4
8.	Alvesta SK	14	1	1	12	32	79	3

==== Final round ====
===== Group A =====
	Club	GP	W	T	L	GF	GA	Pts
1.	Halmstads HK	6	3	2	1	23	14	8
2.	Hästen Hockey	6	3	2	1	20	15	8
3.	IK Pantern	6	3	1	2	21	14	7
4.	Mjölby Hockey	6	0	1	5	8	29	1

===== Group B =====
	Club	GP	W	T	L	GF	GA	Pts
1.	Borås HC	6	4	1	1	16	9	9
2.	Växjö Lakers Hockey	6	3	1	2	23	18	7
3.	Skövde IK	6	2	1	3	20	23	5
4.	Nybro Vikings IF	6	1	1	4	15	24	3

==== Relegation ====
===== Group A =====
	Club	GP	W	T	L	GF	GA	Pts
1.	Bäcken HC	10	7	2	1	60	25	16
2.	Partille Hockey	10	7	0	3	57	37	14
3.	Tibro IK	10	4	2	4	42	43	10
4.	Kungälvs IK	10	5	0	5	34	35	10
5.	Grästorps IK	10	3	1	6	36	39	7
6.	Trollhättans HC	10	1	1	8	17	67	3

===== Group B =====
	Club	GP	W	T	L	GF	GA	Pts
1.	HC Dalen	10	8	1	1	42	21	17
2.	Jonstorps IF	10	8	0	2	54	26	16
3.	Helsingborgs HC	10	5	1	4	48	45	11
4.	Värnamo GIK	10	4	0	6	45	39	8
5.	Alvesta SK	10	3	1	6	33	59	7
6.	Boro-Vetlanda HC	10	0	1	9	25	57	1
