= 2001–02 Division 1 season (Swedish ice hockey) =

- League: Division 1
- Sport: Ice hockey
- Number of teams: 75
- Promoted to Division 1: Vallentuna BK; Örnsköldsviks SK; Nybro Vikings IF
- Relegated to Division 2: Överkalix IF, KB 65, Hedemora, Kristinehamn HT, Waxholm, Haninge HF, Tibro IK, Vänersborgs HC, Partille Hockey, Hanhals/Kungsbacka, Boro-Vetlanda HC, HC Dalen, Nittorps IK, Mjölby Hockey, Göteborgs IK, Backen HC, Jonstorps IF, Helsingborgs HC, Olofströms IK, Limhamn HC

Division 1 seasons
- ← 2000–01 2002–03 →

2001–02 was the third season that Division 1 functioned as the third-level of ice hockey in Sweden, below the second-level Allsvenskan and the top-level Elitserien (now the SHL).

== Format ==
The league was divided into four regional groups. In each region, the top teams qualified for the Kvalserien till Allsvenskan, for the opportunity to be promoted to the Allsvenskan. The bottom teams in each group were forced to play in a relegation round against the top teams from Division 2 in order to retain their spot in Division 1 for the following season. These were also conducted within each region.

== Season ==
=== Northern region ===
==== First round ====
===== Group A =====
	Club	GP	W	T	L	GF	GA	Pts
1.	Tegs SK	28	25	0	3	244	74	50
2.	Clemensnäs HC	28	21	2	5	174	80	44
3.	Vännäs HC	28	19	1	8	158	99	39
4.	Asplöven HC	28	15	0	13	133	137	30
5.	Lycksele SK	28	9	2	17	112	150	20
6.	Kalix HF	28	9	1	18	114	153	19
7.	SK Lejon	28	6	2	20	80	174	14
8.	Överkalix IF	28	2	4	22	75	223	8

===== Group B =====
	Club	GP	W	T	L	GF	GA	Pts
1.	Örnsköldsviks SK	27	24	3	0	206	61	51
2.	Östersunds IK	27	22	1	4	152	75	45
3.	AIK Härnösand	27	13	6	8	125	120	32
4.	Sollefteå	27	12	7	8	135	95	31
5.	Brunflo IK	27	13	3	11	110	96	29
6.	Kovland	27	9	3	15	93	110	21
7.	Svedjeholmen	27	8	5	14	89	135	21
8.	Kramfors	27	5	6	16	79	141	16
9.	LN 91	27	6	2	19	83	128	14
10.	KB 65	27	4	2	21	77	189	10

==== Playoffs ====
- Östersunds IK - Tegs SKK 3:4, 1:5
- Clemensnäs HC - Örnsköldsviks SK 4:5, 5:5 OT

==== Relegation ====
===== Group A =====
	Club	GP	W	T	L	GF	GA	Pts
1.	Malå	6	4	1	1	28	20	9
2.	SK Lejon	6	2	2	2	19	18	6
3.	Älvsby	6	2	1	3	19	27	5
4.	Överkalix IF	6	2	0	4	22	23	4

===== Group B =====
	Club	GP	W	T	L	GF	GA	Pts
1.	LN 91	6	3	3	0	26	14	9
2.	Bräcke	6	3	2	1	27	28	8
3.	KB 65	6	1	2	3	19	23	4
4.	Husum	6	1	1	4	18	25	3

=== Western region ===
==== First round ====
===== Group A =====
	Club	GP	W	T	L	GF	GA	Pts
1.	Västerås IK	18	13	3	2	77	39	29
2.	Surahammars IF	18	9	4	5	82	54	22
3.	Borlänge HF	18	8	4	6	67	57	20
4.	Hille/Åbyggeby IK	18	8	4	6	63	59	20
5.	Valbo AIF	18	7	4	7	55	58	18
6.	Avesta BK	18	7	4	7	55	64	18
7.	Västerås HC	18	7	2	9	63	69	16
8.	Skutskärs SK	18	6	3	9	65	79	15
9.	Hedemora SK	18	5	2	11	72	96	12
10.	Hudiksvalls HC	18	4	2	12	57	81	10

===== Group B =====
	Club	GP	W	T	L	GF	GA	Pts
1.	Sunne IK	18	16	0	2	155	32	32
2.	IFK Kumla	18	16	0	2	110	35	32
3.	Grums IK	18	14	1	3	133	47	29
4.	IFK Hallsberg	18	8	2	8	75	58	18
5.	Åmåls SK	18	6	3	9	68	83	15
6.	Nor IK	18	7	0	11	60	105	14
7.	Arvika HC	18	6	1	11	67	80	13
8.	Skåre BK	18	5	3	10	56	79	13
9.	Hammarö HC	18	6	1	11	52	104	13
10.	Kristinehamns HT	18	0	1	17	31	184	1

==== Allettan ====
	Club	GP	W	T	L	GF	GA	Pts
1.	Sunne IK	14	12	0	2	71	32	24
2.	Västerås IK	14	10	2	2	55	29	22
3.	Grums IK	14	7	2	5	49	42	16
4.	IFK Kumla	14	6	2	6	47	49	14
5.	Borlänge HF	14	7	0	7	46	49	14
6.	Surahammars IF	14	4	2	8	53	65	10
7.	Hille/Åbyggeby IK	14	4	2	8	49	63	8
8.	IFK Hallsberg	14	1	2	11	30	65	4

==== Qualification round ====
===== Group A =====
	Club	GP	W	T	L	GF	GA	Pts (Bonus)
1.	Valbo AIF	15	8	1	6	53	45	22(5)
2.	Skutskärs SK	15	8	3	4	78	59	21(2)
3.	Västerås HC	15	8	1	6	61	58	20(3)
4.	Avesta BK	15	6	1	8	40	45	17(4)
5.	Hedemora SK	15	5	3	7	58	66	14(1)
6.	Hudiksvalls HC	15	4	3	8	37	54	11(0)

===== Group B =====
	Club	GP	W	T	L	GF	GA	Pts (Bonus)
1.	Arvika HC	15	10	2	3	73	44	25(3)
2.	Skåre BK	15	8	2	5	71	53	20(2)
3.	Hammarö HC	15	9	1	5	56	55	20(1)
4.	Nor IK	15	7	1	7	55	57	19(4)
5.	Åmåls SK	15	5	1	9	55	63	16(5)
6.	Kristinehamns HT	15	1	3	11	47	85	5(0)

==== Final round ====
===== Group A =====
	Club	GP	W	T	L	GF	GA	Pts
1.	Sunne IK	6	2	3	1	29	16	7
2.	IFK Kumla	6	2	2	2	16	19	6
3.	Borlänge HF	6	2	2	2	16	24	6
4.	Valbo AIF	6	1	3	2	11	13	5

===== Group B =====
	Club	GP	W	T	L	GF	GA	Pts
1.	Västerås IK	6	5	1	0	29	7	11
2.	Grums IK	6	3	1	2	45	19	7
3.	Surahammars IF	6	2	0	4	30	37	4
4.	Arvika HC	6	1	0	5	16	57	2

==== Relegation ====
===== Group A =====
	Club	GP	W	T	L	GF	GA	Pts
1.	Hudiksvall	6	4	1	1	36	16	9
2.	Söderhamn/Ljusne	6	3	1	2	27	23	7
3.	Smedjebacken	6	2	1	3	24	40	5
4.	Hedemora	6	1	1	4	26	34	3

===== Group B =====
	Club	GP	W	T	L	GF	GA	Pts
1.	IK Viking	6	4	1	1	38	21	9
2.	Åmåls SK	6	4	0	2	39	26	8
3.	Karlskoga HC	6	3	1	2	35	19	7
4.	Kristinehamns HT	6	0	0	6	15	61	0

=== Eastern region ===
==== First round ====
===== Group A =====
	Club	GP	W	T	L	GF	GA	Pts
1.	Arlanda HC	14	11	2	1	67	40	24
2.	Trångsund	14	8	4	2	51	30	20
3.	Väsby IK	14	7	3	4	61	52	17
4.	Vallentuna BK	14	6	3	5	56	41	15
5.	Gimo IF	14	6	3	5	71	65	15
6.	Järfälla HC	14	5	1	8	43	54	11
7.	Haninge HF	14	3	2	9	40	56	8
8.	Waxholm	14	1	0	13	32	83	2

===== Group B =====
	Club	GP	W	T	L	GF	GA	Pts
1.	Botkyrka HC	14	9	1	4	61	43	19
2.	Skå IK	14	9	0	5	68	54	18
3.	Mälarhöjden/Bredäng	14	7	4	3	61	51	18
4.	IK Tälje	14	6	1	7	59	58	13
5.	Gnesta IK	14	6	1	7	53	63	13
6.	Nacka HK	14	5	2	7	67	57	12
7.	Linden HC	14	5	1	8	45	51	11
8.	IKF Salem	14	3	2	9	56	93	8

==== Allettan ====
	Club	GP	W	T	L	GF	GA	Pts
1.	Vallentuna BK	21	14	2	5	103	69	30
2.	Botkyrka HC	21	12	5	4	97	65	29
3.	Arlanda HC	21	13	3	5	88	65	29
4.	Mälarhöjden/Bredäng	21	9	4	8	87	89	22
5.	Trångsund	21	9	2	10	78	72	20
6.	Väsby IK	21	7	4	10	76	103	18
7.	Skå IK	21	3	4	14	76	106	10
8.	IK Tälje	21	4	2	15	61	97	10

===== Qualification round =====
	Club	GP	W	T	L	GF	GA	Pts
1.	Gimo IF	21	15	1	5	127	79	31
2.	Nacka HK	21	11	3	7	93	79	25
3.	Linden HC	21	10	3	8	75	59	23
4.	Järfälla HC	21	10	2	9	74	68	22
5.	Gnesta IK	21	9	3	9	87	89	21
6.	IFK Salem	21	7	5	9	86	89	19
7.	Haninge Hockey	21	6	5	10	68	87	17
8.	Waxholm	21	4	2	15	57	117	10

===== Final round =====
	Club	GP	W	T	L	GF	GA	Pts
1.	Botkyrka HC	6	4	0	2	37	23	8
2.	Arlanda Wings HC	6	3	0	3	39	32	6
3.	Mälarhöjden/Bredäng	6	2	2	2	28	33	6
4.	Gimo IF	6	1	2	3	20	36	4

===== Relegation =====
	Club	GP	W	T	L	GF	GA	Pts
1.	Team Uppsala	6	3	2	1	32	21	8
2.	Värmdö HC	6	4	0	2	30	20	8
3.	Waxholm	6	2	2	2	25	29	6
4.	Haninge HF	6	0	2	4	17	34	2

=== Southern region ===
==== First round ====
===== Group A =====
	Club	GP	W	T	L	GF	GA	Pts
1.	Skövde IK	18	14	0	4	111	50	28
2.	Borås HC	18	12	4	2	90	50	28
3.	Hästen Hockey	18	11	3	4	71	56	25
4.	Mariestads BoIS	18	11	2	5	90	56	24
5.	Nittorps IK	18	9	5	4	84	64	23
6.	Mölndals IF	18	7	2	9	72	68	16
7.	Bäcken HC	18	5	2	11	61	94	12
8.	Mjölby Hockey	18	3	5	10	53	79	11
9.	Vänersborg HC	18	3	4	11	50	94	10
10.	Partille	18	0	3	15	34	105	3

===== Group B =====
	Club	GP	W	T	L	GF	GA	Pts
1.	Växjö Lakers Hockey	18	14	2	2	104	42	30
2.	Nybro Vikings IF	18	10	5	3	101	52	25
3.	IK Pantern	18	9	5	4	60	57	23
4.	Tyringe SoSS	18	9	4	5	86	52	22
5.	Kristianstads IK	18	7	4	7	65	69	18
6.	Jonstorps IF	18	5	6	7	59	63	16
7.	Limhamn HC	18	6	4	8	50	66	16
8.	Olofströms IK	18	5	3	10	52	72	13
9.	HC Dalen	18	3	3	12	45	81	9
10.	Hanhals/Kungsbacka	18	3	2	13	48	116	8

==== Allettan ====
	Club	GP	W	T	L	GF	GA	Pts
1.	Nybro Vikings IF	14	9	2	3	56	37	20
2.	Borås HC	14	6	4	4	45	38	16
3.	Skövde IK	14	5	5	4	46	42	15
4.	Växjö Lakers Hockey	14	7	0	7	43	51	14
5.	Hästen Hockey	14	4	5	5	47	51	13
6.	Mariestads BoIS	14	6	1	7	45	50	13
7.	Tyringe SoSS	14	4	4	6	49	50	12
8.	IK Pantern	14	4	1	9	39	51	9

==== Final round ====
	Club	GP	W	T	L	GF	GA	Pts
1.	Växjö Lakers Hockey	6	4	0	2	27	18	8
2.	Nybro Vikings IF	6	3	2	1	14	13	8
3.	Skövde IK	6	1	2	3	22	26	4
4.	Borås HC	6	1	2	3	16	22	4

==== Qualification round ====
===== Group A =====
	Club	GP	W	T	L	GF	GA	Pts
1.	Mölndals IF	14	10	1	3	78	40	21
2.	Nittorps IK	14	9	2	3	79	44	20
3.	Mjölby Hockey	14	9	1	4	53	32	19
4.	Göteborgs IK	14	5	2	7	61	62	12
5.	Bäcken HC	14	6	0	8	57	61	12
6.	Tibro IK	14	5	1	8	51	79	11
7.	Vänersborgs HC	14	3	3	8	44	71	9
8.	Partille Hockey	14	3	2	9	41	75	8

===== Group B =====
	Club	GP	W	T	L	GF	GA	Pts
1.	Jonstorps IF	14	10	1	3	47	34	21
2.	Kristianstads IK	14	8	3	3	59	37	19
3.	Limhamn HC	14	6	3	5	54	49	15
4.	Helsingborgs HC	14	7	1	6	59	67	15
5.	Olofströms IK	14	5	4	5	59	56	14
6.	Hanhals/Kungsbacka	14	5	2	7	51	58	12
7.	Boro-Vetlanda HC	14	5	1	8	47	51	11
8.	HC Dalen	14	2	1	11	38	62	5

==== Relegation ====
===== Group A =====
	Club	GP	W	T	L	GF	GA	Pts
1.	Mölndals IF	10	8	1	1	38	31	17
2.	Tyringe SoSS	10	7	1	2	58	28	15
3.	Nittorps IK	10	5	1	4	47	25	11
4.	Mjölby Hockey	10	3	3	4	31	33	9
5.	Göteborgs IK	10	2	2	6	32	45	6
6.	Bäcken HC	10	1	0	9	28	72	2

===== Group B =====
	Club	GP	W	T	L	GF	GA	Pts
1.	IK Pantern	10	7	2	1	46	19	16
2.	Kristianstads IK	10	5	4	1	55	39	14
3.	Jonstorps IF	10	5	2	3	40	35	12
4.	Helsingborgs HC	10	2	3	5	39	51	7
5.	Olofströms IK	10	3	0	7	36	55	6
6.	Limhamn HC	10	2	1	7	29	46	5
