= 2013–14 Division 1 season (Swedish ice hockey) =

- League: Division 1
- Sport: Ice hockey
- Duration: 11 September 2013 – 5 April 2014
- Number of teams: 53
- Relegated to Division 2: Borås HC; Brunflo IK*; Falu IF**; Gnesta IK*; Hedemora SK; IFK Tumba Hockey; Mjölby HC; Nacka HK; Nittorps IK; Skedvi/Säter IF; *Dropped out of Hockeyettan qualifiers due to financial reasons **Voluntarily accepted relegation after Hockeyettan qualifier due to financial reasons

Division 1 seasons
- ← 2012–13 2014–15 →

The 2013–14 season of Division 1, the third tier of ice hockey in Sweden, organized by the Swedish Ice Hockey Association (SIHA), began on 11 September 2013. The regular season concluded on 16 February 2014. The following playoffs towards the qualifier to the second-tier league HockeyAllsvenskan began on 19 February 2014 and ended on 7 March 2014. The qualifiers to Division 1 began on 2 March 2014 and ended on 26 March 2014. The qualifier to HockeyAllsvenskan began on 13 March 2014 and ended on 5 April 2014. The 2013–14 season was the last season the league was named "Division 1"; in April 2014, the league was renamed "Hockeyettan".

== Format ==
The league featured 53 teams (a contraction from the 56 of the 2012–13 season), divided into five geographical groups. This was another change from past seasons, which featured six groups, lettered A through F. This season, however, groups A and B were merged into Division 1 Norra ("North"). With the exception of Division 1 North, the teams played each team in their initial groups three times, at least once at home and once on the road. In North, the teams played each team four times, twice at home and twice on the road. As with previous years, groups C through F played until the new year, when the top four teams from each group moved into two new groups, Allettan Mellan ("central") and Allettan Södra ("south"), while the remaining teams played a continuation series in the original groups. Division 1 North, however, continued playing in the same group until the conclusion of the regular season. In the continuation groups, the teams received "starting points", dependent on their rankings in their initial groups; the lowest-ranked team received no points, the second-lowest-ranked 2 points, the third-lowest-ranked 4 points, and so on. In the Allettan groups and the 1F continuation group, the teams played each team in their group twice, once at home and once on the road. In the other continuation groups, the teams played each team in their groups three times, at least once at home and once on the road. After the conclusion of the spring series and Division 1 North, the best-ranked teams of Division 1 North, Allettan Central, and Allettan South continued to the playoffs. The four teams that survived the playoffs would continue to the 2014 HockeyAllsvenskan qualifier (Swedish: Kvalserien till HockeyAllsvenskan). Meanwhile, the teams with the poorest records in North, as well as the continuation groups C through F, would play in the Division 1 qualifiers to retain their spots in Division 1 for the 2014–15 season.

Two teams from Division 1 North, three teams from each of the continuation groups of Division 1 C, D and E, and four teams from the Division 1 F continuation group had to participate in the Division 1 qualifier (Hockeyettan) groups. Only the top team from each of those groups would be guaranteed a Hockeyettan spot in the 2014–15 season, meaning that the league would be cut short by 10 teams and that at least 10 teams would be relegated to Division 2. The SIHA contracted the league down to 47 teams for the 2014–15 season, requiring the SIHA to promote the four second-placed teams in Division 1 qualifiers C–F, the third-placed team from qualifier E, and the third-placed team from qualifier F (the latter two to replace Falu IF, who voluntarily demanded relegation, and bankrupt Nyköpings HK).

=== Playing format ===
Each game consisted of three 20-minute regulation periods, for a total of 60 minutes. After the 60 regulation minutes, the team with the most goals scored won the game. If the game was tied after regulation time, a five-minute overtime period ensued, in which the team scoring the next goal won the game. If no team scored during the overtime period, a shootout ensued, with each team taking three penalty shots against the opposing team's goaltender. If the game was still tied after the three penalty shot rounds, additional rounds ensued until one team scored and the other team didn't. Points were awarded for each game, with a win in regulation time giving 3 points, an overtime/shootout win 2 points, an overtime/shootout loss 1 point, and a regulation loss 0 points.

=== Tiebreak ===
In case two or more teams ended up tied in points, the following tiebreakers were used:

1. Better goal difference;
2. Higher number of goals scored;
3. Results in games between the tied teams.

== Participating teams ==
Division 1 North	Division 1C	Division 1D	Division 1E	Division 1F
Brunflo IK; IF Sundsvall Hockey; Kalix UHC; Kiruna IF; Kovlands IshF; Örnsköldsvik HF; Östersunds IK; Piteå HC; SK Lejon; Sollefteå HK; Tegs SK; Vännäs HC	Åker/Strängnäs HC; Borlänge HF; Enköpings SK; Falu IF; Hedemora SK; Hudiksvalls HC; Lindlövens IF; Skedvi/Säter IF; Surahammars IF; Tierps HK	Gnesta IK; Hammarby IF (p); Huddinge IK; IFK Tumba Hockey; IF Vallentuna BK; Nacka HK; Nyköpings HK; Wings HC Arlanda; Visby/Roma HK; Väsby IK HK	Forshaga IF (p); Grästorps IK; HC Vita Hästen; Kumla HC Black Bulls; Mariestad BoIS HC; Mjölby HC; Skövde IK; Tranås AIF IF; Vimmerby HC; Västerviks IK	Borås HC; Halmstad HF; Helsingborgs HC; IK Pantern; Kallinge-Ronneby IF; Kristianstads IK; Mörrums GoIS IK; Nittorps IK; Nybro Vikings IF; Olofströms IK; Tingsryds AIF (r)

r = Relegated from 2012–13 HockeyAllsvenskan
p = Promoted from 2012–13 Division 2

Note that Botkyrka HC merged with IFK Tumba Hockey during the off-season.

== Initial groups ==
=== Division 1 North ===
Division 1 North was formed out of a merger of Division 1A and 1B. It consisted of 12 teams, and play continued in this group through the entire regular season.

* Qualifies for Playoff 3
* Qualifies for Playoff 2
* Qualifies for Playoff 1
* Forced to play Qualifier A to requalify for Division 1

#	Team	GP	W	T	L	GF	GA	GD	TP	OTW	OTL	GWSW	GWSL
1	Piteå HC	44	31	8	5	195	87	+108	107	6	1	0	1
2	IF Sundsvall Hockey	44	32	6	6	180	71	+109	105	2	2	1	1
3	Kiruna IF	44	27	6	11	161	78	+83	92	3	1	2	0
4	Östersunds IK	44	23	8	13	151	107	+44	80	2	1	1	4
5	Tegs SK	44	23	6	15	134	114	+20	77	0	4	2	0
6	Kalix UHC	44	22	7	15	116	94	+22	76	1	3	2	1
7	Örnsköldsvik HF	44	21	4	19	136	130	+6	68	0	1	1	2
8	Vännäs HC	44	13	6	25	121	163	–42	48	0	2	3	1
9	Sollefteå HK	44	14	5	25	105	165	–60	48	1	1	0	3
10	SK Lejon	44	12	5	27	95	161	–66	46	4	0	1	0
11	Brunflo IK	44	5	6	33	84	182	–88	24	2	2	1	1
12	Kovlands IshF	44	6	3	35	74	210	–136	21	0	3	0	0

=== Division 1C ===
* Teams 1–4 play the second half of the season in Allettan Central.
* Teams 5–10 continue in the same group

#	Team	GP	W	T	L	GF	GA	GD	TP	OTW	OTL	GWSW	GWSL
1	Hudiksvalls HC	27	18	7	2	131	71	+60	63	1	4	1	1
2	Åker/Strängnäs HC	27	16	5	6	141	85	+56	57	3	1	1	0
3	Borlänge HF	27	13	8	6	103	83	+20	52	2	1	3	2
4	Enköpings SK	27	12	7	8	103	77	+26	49	2	1	4	0
5	Tierps HK	27	11	8	8	79	73	+6	44	2	1	1	4
6	Surhammars IF	27	12	3	12	83	95	–12	39	0	1	0	2
7	Lindlövens IF	27	10	5	12	87	82	+5	38	1	0	2	2
8	Falu IF	27	10	3	14	101	111	–10	33	0	2	0	1
9	Hedemora SK	27	7	2	18	76	133	–57	24	1	1	0	0
10	Skedvi/Säter IF	27	1	2	24	56	150	–94	6	1	1	0	0

==== Division 1C continuation ====
* Team 1 continues to Playoff 1
* Teams 4–6 are forced to play Qualifier C to requalify for Division 1

#	Team	GP	W	T	L	GF	GA	GD	TP	OTW	OTL	GWSW	GWSL
1	Tierps HK	15	11	2	2	64	43	+21	44 (10)	0	0	1	1
2	Surahammars IF	15	8	3	4	55	36	+19	34 (8)	1	0	0	2
3	Lindlövens IF	15	8	2	5	65	39	+26	32 (6)	0	0	2	0
4	Falu IF	15	8	3	4	57	45	+12	30 (4)	0	1	1	1
5	Hedemora SK	15	2	1	12	34	72	–38	8 (2)	0	0	0	1
6	Skedvi/Säter IF	15	2	1	12	36	76	–40	8 (0)	0	0	1	0

=== Division 1D ===
* Teams 1–4 play the second half of the season in Allettan Central.
* Teams 5–10 continue in the same group

#	Team	GP	W	T	L	GF	GA	GD	TP	OTW	OTL	GWSW	GWSL
1	Huddinge IK	27	19	5	3	126	43	+83	66	2	0	2	1
2	Visby/Roma HK	27	17	6	4	106	61	+45	60	2	2	1	1
3	Nyköpings HK	27	17	4	6	123	57	+66	58	0	0	3	1
4	IF Vallentuna BK	27	16	3	8	105	72	+33	53	2	0	0	1
5	Wings HC Arlanda	27	15	6	6	101	70	+31	53	2	2	0	2
6	Väsby IK HK	27	10	2	15	83	93	–10	33	0	1	1	0
7	Hammarby IF	27	9	3	15	86	107	–21	31	0	2	1	0
8	IFK Tumba Hockey	27	7	3	17	82	122	–40	26	1	0	1	1
9	Gnesta IK	27	6	1	20	56	116	–60	19	0	0	0	1
10	Nacka HK	27	1	3	23	50	177	–127	6	0	2	0	1

==== Division 1D continuation ====
* Team 1 continues to Playoff 1
* Teams 4–6 are forced to play Qualifier D to requalify for Division 1

#	Team	GP	W	T	L	GF	GA	GD	TP	OTW	OTL	GWSW	GWSL
1	Wings HC Arlanda	15	10	2	3	66	35	+31	42 (10)	1	0	1	0
2	Väsby IK HK	15	7	6	2	64	48	+16	36 (8)	1	1	2	2
3	Hammarby IF	15	8	3	4	54	37	+17	32 (6)	0	0	1	2
4	IFK Tumba Hockey	15	5	4	6	53	56	–3	21 (4)	0	1	0	3
5	Nacka HK	15	2	4	9	31	65	–34	13 (0)	0	1	3	0
6	Gnesta IK	15	2	3	10	43	70	–27	12 (2)	1	0	1	1

=== Division 1E ===
* Teams 1–4 play the second half of the season in Allettan South.
* Teams 5–10 continue in the same group

#	Team	GP	W	T	L	GF	GA	GD	TP	OTW	OTL	GWSW	GWSL
1	HC Vita Hästen	27	18	6	3	131	67	+64	62	1	2	1	2
2	Vimmerby HC	27	17	6	4	106	64	+42	60	1	0	2	3
3	Mariestad BoIS HC	27	15	4	8	80	65	+15	52	1	0	2	1
4	Skövde IK	27	14	6	7	92	82	+10	48	0	2	0	4
5	Västerviks IK	27	14	2	11	104	75	+29	45	1	0	0	1
6	Tranås AIF IF	27	11	6	10	91	81	+10	42	3	1	0	2
7	Kumla HC Black Bulls	27	8	5	14	67	97	–30	33	1	1	3	0
8	Forshaga IF	27	6	3	18	81	116	–35	24	1	0	2	0
9	Mjölby HC	27	6	3	18	73	122	–49	22	0	2	1	0
10	Grästorps IK	27	4	3	20	62	118	–56	17	0	1	2	0

==== Division 1E continuation ====
* Team 1 continues to Playoff 1
* Teams 4–6 are forced to play Qualifier E to requalify for Division 1

#	Team	GP	W	T	L	GF	GA	GD	TP	OTW	OTL	GWSW	GWSL
1	Västerviks IK	15	14	0	1	72	32	+40	50 (10)	0	0	0	0
2	Tranås AIF IF	15	11	1	3	64	30	+34	41 (8)	1	0	0	0
3	Kumla HC Black Bulls	15	6	1	8	32	51	–19	23 (6)	0	0	0	1
4	Forshaga IF	15	2	5	8	42	60	–18	15 (4)	0	2	2	1
5	Mjölby HC	15	4	1	10	41	62	–21	15 (2)	0	0	1	0
6	Grästorps IK	15	3	2	10	42	58	–16	12 (0)	1	0	0	1

=== Division 1F ===
* Teams 1–4 play the second half of the season in Allettan South.
* Teams 5–11 continue in the same group

#	Team	GP	W	T	L	GF	GA	GD	TP	OTW	OTL	GWSW	GWSL
1	Tingsryds AIF	30	21	5	4	125	59	+66	73	3	0	2	0
2	Kallinge-Ronneby IF	30	18	4	8	93	62	+31	60	1	2	1	0
3	Helsingborgs HC	30	16	7	7	107	76	+31	57	2	2	0	3
4	Mörrums GoIS IK	30	18	3	9	99	80	+19	57	0	2	0	1
5	Kristianstads IK	30	17	4	9	106	88	+18	57	1	0	1	2
6	Halmstad HF	30	12	7	11	121	102	+19	46	3	2	0	2
7	IK Pantern	30	12	4	14	82	81	+1	42	0	2	2	0
8	Olofströms IK	30	12	4	14	96	97	–1	42	0	1	2	1
9	Nybro Vikings IF	30	9	4	17	86	91	–5	34	2	1	1	0
10	Borås HC	30	3	5	22	51	126	–75	17	2	1	1	1
11	Nittorps IK	30	1	5	24	50	154	–104	10	1	2	1	1

==== Division 1F continuation ====
* Team 1 continues to Playoff 1
* Teams 4–7 are forced to play Qualifier F to requalify for Division 1

#	Team	GP	W	T	L	GF	GA	GD	TP	OTW	OTL	GWSW	GWSL
1	Kristianstads IK	12	8	0	4	41	29	+12	32 (12)	0	0	0	0
2	Halmstad HF	12	6	4	2	44	30	+14	29 (10)	0	2	1	1
3	Olofströms IK	12	8	1	3	42	37	+5	28 (6)	1	0	0	0
4	Nybro Vikings IF	12	7	2	3	53	27	+26	26 (4)	2	0	0	0
5	IK Pantern	12	5	2	5	39	36	+3	22 (8)	0	1	1	0
6	Borås HC	12	2	0	10	22	48	–26	6 (2)	0	0	0	0
7	Nittorps IK	12	1	1	10	20	54	–34	4 (0)	0	0	0	1

== Allettan Central ==
* Qualifies for Playoff 3
* Qualifies for Playoff 2
* Qualifies for Playoff 1

#	Team	GP	W	T	L	GF	GA	GD	TP	OTW	OTL	GWSW	GWSL
1	Nyköpings HK	14	12	0	2	71	31	+40	36	0	0	0	0
2	Visby/Roma HK	14	7	5	2	45	27	+18	30	1	0	3	1
3	Hudiksvalls HC	14	9	1	4	42	33	+9	29	0	0	1	0
4	Huddinge IK	14	8	3	3	43	30	+13	27	0	0	0	3
5	Borlänge HF	14	6	0	8	54	52	+2	18	0	0	0	0
6	Åker/Strängnäs HC	14	2	3	9	35	53	–18	11	0	1	2	0
7	IF Vallentuna BK	14	2	3	9	42	66	–24	11	1	0	1	1
8	Enköpings SK	14	1	3	10	34	74	–40	6	0	1	0	2

== Allettan South ==
* Qualifies for Playoff 3
* Qualifies for Playoff 2
* Qualifies for Playoff 1

#	Team	GP	W	T	L	GF	GA	GD	TP	OTW	OTL	GWSW	GWSL
1	HC Vita Hästen	14	9	3	2	49	33	+16	31	0	0	1	2
2	Kallinge-Ronneby IF	14	9	1	4	48	27	+21	29	1	0	0	0
3	Tingsryds AIF	14	6	3	5	47	40	+7	24	1	0	2	0
4	Mariestad BoIS HC	14	4	6	4	46	39	+7	22	0	1	4	1
5	Vimmerby HC	14	5	4	5	45	47	–2	21	0	1	2	1
6	Mörrums GoIS IK	14	5	2	7	31	48	–17	17	0	0	0	2
7	Helsingborgs HC	14	4	3	7	26	45	–19	15	0	0	0	3
8	Skövde IK	14	1	4	9	34	47	–13	9	0	0	2	2

== Promotion playoffs ==
The promotion playoffs was divided into three rounds: Playoff 1, Playoff 2, and Playoff 3. The six top-ranked teams from Division 1 North, the four top-ranked teams from each of the Allettan groups, and the top ranked team from each of the continuation groups qualified for the playoffs. Each playoff match-up was a best-of-three series, with the winners of each playoff round continuing to the next round. In each series the higher-seeded team received home advantage and played an eventual third game at home if necessary to determine a winner of the series. The four teams winning the final round, Playoff 3, continued to the 2014 HockeyAllsvenskan qualifier (Kval till HockeyAllsvenskan) and attempted promotion to the second-tier league HockeyAllsvenskan.

Piteå, Nyköping, and Vita Hästen won the North and Allettan groups, and therefore received byes to the third round. Sundsvall had the best points average of the second-place North and Allettan teams, and therefore also skipped to the third round. The two other second-place teams, KRIF and Visby also finished, received byes to the second round.

In Playoff 1, match-ups were determined by the standings in each spring series (including Division 1 North). In Playoff 2 and Playoff 3, match-ups were determined through random draw.

=== Playoff 1 ===
Kiruna IF, Östersunds IK, Hudiksvalls HC, Huddinge IK, Tingsryds AIF, and Kristianstads IK won their match-ups, and continued to Playoff 2. They defeated Kalix UHC, Tegs SK, Tierps HK, Wings HC Arlanda, Västerviks IK, and Mariestad BoIS HC respectively.

==== Kiruna vs Kalix (2–0) ====
February 20, 2014; 19:00	Kalix UHC	2 – 3 (0–3, 1–0, 1–0)	Kiruna IF	Fururinken, Kalix; Attendance: 553

Game reference
8 min	Penalties	18 min
26	Shots	36

February 22, 2014; 15:00	Kiruna IF	2 – 1 (1–0, 0–0, 1–1)	Kalix UHC	Lombiahallen, Kiruna; Attendance: 400

Game reference
6 min	Penalties	8 min
45	Shots	25

==== Östersund vs Teg (2–0) ====
February 19, 2014; 19:00	Tegs SK	2 – 4 (1–0, 1–2, 0–2)	Östersunds IK	T3 Center, Umeå; Attendance: 336

Game reference
6 min	Penalties	8 min
19	Shots	25

February 22, 2014; 18:30	Östersunds IK	4 – 1 (0–0, 1–0, 3–1)	Tegs SK	Z-Hallen, Östersund; Attendance: 731

Game reference
6 min	Penalties	8 min
36	Shots	25

==== Hudiksvall vs Tierp (2–1) ====
February 20, 2014; 19:00	Tierps HK	5 – 4 (1–2, 1–1, 3–1)	Hudiksvalls HC	Vegahallen, Tierp; Attendance: 187

Game reference
8 min	Penalties	0 min
27	Shots	26

February 22, 2014; 15:00	Hudiksvalls HC	3 – 1 (0–0, 1–1, 2–0)	Tierps HK	Glysishallen, Hudiksvall; Attendance: 751

Game reference
38 min	Penalties	57 min
36	Shots	15

February 23, 2014; 16:00	Hudiksvalls HC	8 – 2 (3–0, 2–1, 3–1)	Tierps HK	Glysishallen, Hudiksvall; Attendance: 773

Game reference
12 min	Penalties	22 min
46	Shots	23

==== Huddinge vs Wings (2–1) ====
February 20, 2014; 19:00	Wings HC Arlanda	1 – 0 (1–0, 0–0, 0–0)	Huddinge IK	Pinbackshallen, Märsta; Attendance: 321

Game reference
14 min	Penalties	8 min
24	Shots	38

February 22, 2014; 13:00	Huddinge IK	3 – 2 (1–1, 2–0, 0–1)	Wings HC Arlanda	Björkängshallen, Huddinge; Attendance: 397

Game reference
8 min	Penalties	12 min
35	Shots	25

February 23, 2014; 18:00	Huddinge IK	3 – 2 (1–0, 2–1, 0–1)	Wings HC Arlanda	Björkängshallen, Huddinge; Attendance: 391

Game reference
8 min	Penalties	14 min
22	Shots	26

==== Tingsryd vs Västervik (2–1) ====
February 20, 2014; 19:00	Västerviks IK	4 – 5 OT (1–0, 1–3, 2–1, 0–1)	Tingsryds AIF	Plivit Trade hallen, Västervik; Attendance: 1,057

Game reference
10 min	Penalties	4 min
29	Shots	39

February 22, 2014; 15:00	Tingsryds AIF	2 – 3 OT (0–1, 1–1, 1–0, 0–1)	Västerviks IK	Nelson Garden Arena, Tingsryd; Attendance: 1,711

Game reference
6 min	Penalties	10 min
26	Shots	46

February 23, 2014; 18:00	Tingsryds AIF	5 – 2 (1–0, 1–2, 3–0)	Västerviks IK	Nelson Garden Arena, Tingsryd; Attendance: 1,222

Game reference
14 min	Penalties	28 min
29	Shots	34

==== Mariestad vs Kristianstad (1–2) ====
February 20, 2014; 19:00	Kristianstads IK	4 – 3 (1–0, 2–2, 1–1)	Mariestad BoIS HC	Kristianstads Ishall, Kristianstad; Attendance: 1,218

Game reference
16 min	Penalties	16 min
21	Shots	28

February 22, 2014; 15:00	Mariestad BoIS HC	3 – 2 (2–1, 1–0, 0–1)	Kristianstads IK	Katrinhallen Ishall, Mariestad; Attendance: 1,260

Game reference
8 min	Penalties	34 min
32	Shots	32

February 23, 2014; 18:00	Mariestad BoIS HC	4 – 5 (2–2, 1–2, 1–1)	Kristianstads IK	Katrinhallen Ishall, Mariestad; Attendance: 1,199

Game reference
4 min	Penalties	10 min
32	Shots	26

=== Playoff 2 ===
The six Playoff 1 winners were ranked by their record in their spring series, on the basis of 1) which spring series the teams played in (i.e. Allettan or the continuation series, except Division 1 North), 2) ranking in the standings, 3) points average, 4) goal difference, and 5) goals scored. The two highest-ranked Playoff 1 winners and the two directly-qualified teams faced the four other Playoff 1 winners. The four match-ups were determined through random draw.

==== Kiruna IF vs Tingsryds AIF (0–2) ====
February 27, 2014; 19:00	Tingsryds AIF	6 – 1 (2–0, 2–1, 2–0)	Kiruna IF	Nelson Garden Arena, Tingsryd; Attendance: 1,779

Game reference
10 min	Penalties	16 min
40	Shots	20

March 1, 2014; 15:00	Kiruna IF	1 – 2 (0–1, 1–1, 0–0)	Tingsryds AIF	Lombiahallen, Kiruna; Attendance: 407

Game reference
6 min	Penalties	12 min
48	Shots	16

==== Hudiksvalls HC vs Kristianstads IK (0–2) ====
February 27, 2014; 19:00	Kristianstads IK	1 – 0 OT (0–0, 0–0, 0–0, 1–0)	Hudiksvalls HC	Kristianstads Ishall, Kristianstad; Attendance: 1,557

Game reference
20 min	Penalties	22 min
34	Shots	28

March 1, 2014; 18:00	Hudiksvalls HC	4 – 5 (2–1, 1–3, 1–1)	Kristianstads IK	Glysishallen, Hudiksvall; Attendance: 1,187

Game reference
12 min	Penalties	12 min
27	Shots	28

==== Visby/Roma HK vs Huddinge IK (2–0) ====
February 27, 2014; 19:00	Huddinge IK	2 – 3 OT (1–0, 1–2, 0–0, 0–1)	Visby/Roma HK	Björkängshallen, Huddinge; Attendance: 618

Game reference
10 min	Penalties	6 min
40	Shots	33

March 1, 2014; 15:00	Visby/Roma HK	2 – 1 (1–1, 1–0, 0–0)	Huddinge IK	Visby Ishall, Visby; Attendance: 1,312

Game reference
12 min	Penalties	22 min
21	Shots	35

==== Kallinge-Ronneby IF vs Östersunds IK (2–0) ====
February 27, 2014; 19:00	Östersunds IK	1 – 4 (0–1, 1–2, 0–1)	Kallinge-Ronneby IF	Z-Hallen, Östersund; Attendance: 1,250

Game reference
4 min	Penalties	14 min
30	Shots	24

March 1, 2014; 15:00	Kallinge-Ronneby IF	2 – 0 (1–0, 0–0, 1–0)	Östersunds IK	Kockumhallen, Kallinge; Attendance: 1,033

Game reference
8 min	Penalties	18 min
29	Shots	24

=== Playoff 3 ===
The four directly-qualified teams faced the four Playoff 2 winners. The four match-ups were determined through random draw. Piteå HC, Tingsryds AIF, HC Vita Hästen, and Kallinge-Ronneby IF both swept their series and proceeded to the 2014 HockeyAllsvenskan qualifier.

==== Piteå HC vs Kristianstads IK (2–0) ====
5 March 2014; 19:00	Kristianstads IK	1 – 6 (0–0, 0–3, 1–3)	Piteå HC	Kristianstads Ishall, Kristianstad; Attendance: 1,938

Game reference
107 min	Penalties	31 min
28	Shots	49

7 March 2014; 19:00	Piteå HC	4 – 2 (2–0, 0–2, 2–0)	Kristianstads IK	LF Arena, Piteå; Attendance: 1,259

Game reference
4 min	Penalties	35 min
34	Shots	32

==== Nyköpings HK vs Tingsryds AIF (0–2) ====
5 March 2014; 19:00	Tingsryds AIF	5 – 2 (0–1, 2–1, 3–0)	Nyköpings HK	Nelson Garden Arena, Tingsryd; Attendance: 1,913

Game reference
16 min	Penalties	8 min
35	Shots	30

7 March 2014; 19:00	Nyköpings HK	2 – 4 (0–0, 1–2, 1–2)	Tingsryds AIF	Stora Hallen, Nyköping; Attendance: 2,302

Game reference
12 min	Penalties	10 min
28	Shots	30

==== HC Vita Hästen vs Visby/Roma HK (2–0) ====
5 March 2014; 19:00	Visby/Roma HK	4 – 5 (OT) (2–4, 1–0, 1–0, 0–1)	HC Vita Hästen	Visby Ishall, Visby; Attendance: 1,543

Game reference
4 min	Penalties	10 min
27	Shots	38

7 March 2014; 19:00	HC Vita Hästen	6 – 0 (3–0, 0–0, 3–0)	Visby/Roma HK	Himmelstalundshallen, Nyköping; Attendance: 3,729

Game reference
24 min	Penalties	18 min
38	Shots	22

==== IF Sundsvall Hockey vs Kallinge-Ronneby IF (0–2) ====
5 March 2014; 19:00	Kallinge-Ronneby IF	3 – 2 (1–0, 1–2, 1–0)	IF Sundsvall Hockey	Kockumhallen, Kallinge; Attendance: 1,023

Game reference
22 min	Penalties	34 min
29	Shots	30

7 March 2014; 19:00	IF Sundsvall Hockey	2 – 3 (0–1, 1–1, 1–1)	Kallinge-Ronneby IF	Gärdehov, Sundsvall; Attendance: 2,343

Game reference
8 min	Penalties	8 min
25	Shots	18

== Division 1 qualifiers (Hockeyettan) ==
The winners of the five qualifiers were guaranteed spots in the league for the 2014–15 season. In order to get 47 teams in the 2014–15 season, the SIHA also promoted the four second-placed teams from qualifiers C–F. However, two of those 47 teams pulled out of the league during the preseason, resulting in two other teams from the qualifiers being promoted:

- Nyköpings HK, who had qualified for the following Hockeyettan season by reaching Allettan Central and been placed in the West group, went bankrupt on 15 April 2014 and ceased to exist. In response, the SIHA promoted third-placed Varberg Vipers from qualifier F and placed them in the South group; moved HC Dalen from the West group to the South group; and moved Västerviks IK and Vimmerby HC from the South group to the West group.
- Falu IF, who won qualifier C and were seated in the West group, demanded relegation to Division 2 on 13 May 2014 due to financial problems. The SIHA responded by promoting third-placed Grästorps IK from qualifier E to replace Falu's spot in Hockeyettan West.

Key
* Play in the 2014–15 Hockeyettan season.
* Play in Division 2 for the 2014–15 season.
▲ Team was promoted	▼ Team was relegated

=== Qualifier A ===
#	Team	GP	W	T	L	GF	GA	GD	TP	OTW	OTL	GWSW	GWSL
1	Kovlands IshF	4	3	1	0	17	7	+10	10	0	1	0	0
2	Husum HK	4	1	1	2	19	20	–1	5	1	0	0	0
3	AIK-Hockey Härnösand	4	1	0	3	13	22	–9	3	0	0	0	0

=== Qualifier C ===
#	Team	GP	W	T	L	GF	GA	GD	TP	OTW	OTL	GWSW	GWSL
1	▼ Falu IF	8	7	1	0	50	19	+31	23	0	0	1	0
2	▲IFK Arboga IK	8	5	1	2	38	22	+16	17	0	0	1	0
3	Valbo HC	8	4	0	4	30	30	±0	12	0	0	0	0
4	▼ Hedemora SK	8	2	2	4	16	30	–14	8	0	0	0	2
5	▼ Skedvi/Säter IF	8	0	0	8	11	44	–33	0	0	0	0	0

=== Qualifier D ===
#	Team	GP	W	T	L	GF	GA	GD	TP	OTW	OTL	GWSW	GWSL
1	▲ Värmdö HC	8	6	1	1	34	16	+18	20	1	0	0	0
2	▲ Haninge Anchors HC	8	5	1	2	39	21	+18	16	0	1	0	0
3	▼IFK Tumba Hockey	8	3	1	4	29	24	+5	11	0	0	1	0
4	▼ Nacka HK	8	2	1	5	25	42	–17	8	0	0	1	0
5	Tyresö Hanviken Hockey	8	1	2	5	18	42	–24	5	0	0	0	2

=== Qualifier E ===
#	Team	GP	W	T	L	GF	GA	GD	TP	OTW	OTL	GWSW	GWSL
1	▲HC Dalen	8	5	2	1	28	19	+9	18	0	1	1	0
2	Forshaga IF	8	5	1	2	28	17	+11	17	0	0	1	0
3	Grästorps IK	8	4	1	3	32	24	+8	13	0	0	0	1
4	▼ Mjölby HC	8	3	1	4	27	26	+1	10	0	0	0	1
5	Grums IK Hockey	8	0	1	7	19	48	–29	2	1	0	0	0

=== Qualifier F ===
#	Team	GP	W	T	L	GF	GA	GD	TP	OTW	OTL	GWSW	GWSL
1	IK Pantern	10	8	0	2	52	22	+30	24	0	0	0	0
2	Nybro Vikings IF	10	7	2	1	51	28	+23	23	0	0	0	2
3	▲ Varberg Vipers	10	5	2	3	37	34	+3	19	0	0	2	0
4	▼ Borås HC	10	3	2	5	30	35	–5	12	0	0	1	1
5	▼ Nittorps IK	10	2	1	7	26	51	–25	7	0	0	0	1
6	Tyringe SoSS	10	1	1	8	25	51	–26	5	0	0	1	0

== HockeyAllsvenskan qualifier ==
The four playoff winners—HC Vita Hästen, Kallinge-Ronneby IF, Piteå HC, and Tingsryds AIF—played the two lowest-ranked teams from HockeyAllsvenskan—IF Björklöven and IF Troja/Ljungby—in a double round-robin tournament, facing each team once at home and once on the road for a total of 10 games per team. HC Vita Hästen managed to promote to HockeyAllsvenskan at the expense of IF Troja/Ljungby, while IF Björklöven defended their HockeyAllsvenskan spot.

* Teams 1–2 qualify for 2014–15 HockeyAllsvenskan season
* Teams 3–6 qualify for 2014–15 Hockeyettan season
▲ Promoted to HockeyAllsvenskan	▼ Relegated to Hockeyettan

#	Team	GP	W	T	L	GF	GA	GD	TP	OTW	OTL	GWSW	GWSL
1	▲HC Vita Hästen	10	6	3	1	44	28	+16	23	2	1	0	0
2	IF Björklöven	10	6	3	1	31	23	+8	21	0	2	0	1
3	▼IF Troja/Ljungby	10	4	2	4	33	36	–3	16	1	0	1	0
4	Tingsryds AIF	10	3	3	4	31	26	+5	13	1	2	0	0
5	Kallinge-Ronneby IF	10	3	0	7	25	38	–13	9	0	0	0	0
6	Piteå HC	10	2	1	7	24	37	–13	8	1	0	0	0
