= 2006–07 Division 1 season (Swedish ice hockey) =

- League: Division 1
- Sport: Ice hockey
- Number of teams: 52
- Promoted to Division 1: Borås HC
- Relegated to Division 2: Vallentuna BK

Division 1 seasons
- ← 2005–06 2007–08 →

2006–07 was the eighth season that Division 1 functioned as the third-level of ice hockey in Sweden, below the second-level HockeyAllsvenskan and the top-level Elitserien (now the SHL).

== Format ==
The 52 participating teams played the first half of the season in six groups divided geographically. The successful teams then moved into three new groups (the Allettan groups), while the remaining teams played in a continuation of their smaller existing groups. The teams with the worst records in these continuation groups were then forced to defend their places in Division 1 against challengers from Division 2 (see "relegation tournament" below) in a round-robin tournament called Kvalserien till Division 1. Meanwhile, the successful teams from the Allettan groups along with the group winners of the continuation groups played a playoff to determine who would have a chance to compete for promotion to the second-tier league HockeyAllsvenskan in Kvalserien till HockeyAllsvenskan.

== First round ==
=== Division 1A ===
	Club	GP	W	OTW	T	OTL	L	GF	GA	Pts
1.	Piteå HC	32	28	0	3	0	1	174	56	87
2.	Kiruna IF	32	20	0	3	0	9	151	101	63
3.	Asplöven HC	32	16	1	4	1	10	137	109	55
4.	Tegs SK	32	15	0	2	0	15	160	113	47
5.	Clemensnäs HC	32	4	0	2	1	25	75	179	15
6.	Luleå Rebels HC	32	2	0	2	0	28	62	222	8

=== Division 1B ===
	Club	GP	W	OTW	T	OTL	L	GF	GA	Pts
1.	Östersund/Brunflo IF	32	19	2	1	0	10	145	86	62
2.	AIK Härnösand	32	19	1	1	0	11	117	98	60
3.	Hudiksvalls HC	32	15	2	3	0	12	117	91	52
4.	Kovlands IF	32	14	0	2	0	16	107	105	44
5.	Örnsköldsviks SK	32	11	0	3	3	15	126	144	39
6.	Kramfors-Alliansen	32	9	0	2	1	20	96	163	30

=== Division 1C ===
	Club	GP	W	OTW	T	OTL	L	GF	GA	Pts
1.	Örebro HK	36	32	1	1	0	2	190	58	99
2.	Enköpings SK	36	23	1	2	3	7	135	91	76
3.	Borlänge HF	36	19	4	3	0	10	142	105	68
4.	Tierps HK	36	16	1	0	2	17	124	145	52
5.	Lindlövens IF	36	15	1	3	1	16	114	125	51
6.	Linden HC	36	13	3	2	2	16	121	133	49
7.	Valbo AIF	36	9	4	4	1	18	105	125	40
8.	Uppsala HC	36	9	1	5	5	16	104	128	39
9.	Surahammars IF	36	7	1	4	2	22	106	169	29
10.	Falu IF	36	5	1	4	2	24	85	147	23

=== Division 1D ===
	Club	GP	W	OTW	T	OTL	L	GF	GA	Pts
1.	Väsby IK	36	27	1	2	1	5	201	96	86
2.	Nacka HK	36	19	2	5	2	8	136	101	68
3.	Haninge HF	36	20	0	2	1	13	126	102	63
4.	IK Hästen	36	18	2	2	2	12	148	120	62
5.	Mälarhöjden/B.	36	15	3	2	2	14	129	123	55
6.	Järfälla HC	36	14	3	0	2	17	128	126	50
7.	Arlanda HC	36	11	5	4	2	14	120	140	49
8.	Vallentuna BK	36	11	1	2	4	18	112	131	41
9.	Botkyrka HC	36	11	3	1	1	20	106	170	41
10.	Trångsunds IF	36	3	0	2	3	28	79	176	14

=== Division 1E ===
	Club	GP	W	OTW	T	OTL	L	GF	GA	Pts
1.	Borås HC	36	32	0	1	0	3	211	61	97
2.	Skövde IK	36	29	1	1	2	3	174	72	92
3.	Tranås AIF	36	24	1	2	1	8	161	95	77
4.	Mariestads BoIS	36	18	1	3	3	11	135	102	62
5.	Skåre BK	36	16	3	1	0	16	131	127	55
6.	Sunne IK	36	13	0	1	1	21	90	123	41
7.	Kungälvs IK	36	12	0	1	1	22	116	170	38
8.	IFK Kumla	36	7	6	1	1	21	94	132	35
9.	Grums IK	36	8	1	2	1	26	111	189	27
10.	Motala AIF	36	2	0	1	3	30	66	218	10

=== Division 1F ===
	Club	GP	W	OTW	T	OTL	L	GF	GA	Pts
1.	IF Troja-Ljungby	36	31	2	1	0	2	191	56	98
2.	Kristianstad	36	20	4	2	3	7	147	94	73
3.	Tingsryds AIF	36	19	4	6	0	7	153	83	71
4.	Olofströms IK	36	19	1	5	1	10	155	125	65
5.	IK Pantern	36	18	1	2	2	13	115	120	60
6.	Gislaveds SK	36	13	2	1	0	20	95	108	44
7.	Helsingborgs HC	36	12	0	4	3	17	110	122	43
8.	Mörrums GoIS	36	11	0	2	2	21	127	155	37
9.	Jonstorps IF	36	4	2	4	2	24	83	177	22
10.	Tyringe SoSS	36	2	0	3	3	28	90	226	12

== AllEttan ==
=== Northern Group ===
	Club	GP	W	OTW	T	OTL	L	GF	GA	Pts
1.	Piteå HC	6	5	0	1	0	0	37	15	16
2.	AIK Härnösand	6	2	1	1	0	2	22	26	9
3.	Östersund/Brunflo IF	6	2	0	1	1	3	18	23	7
4.	Kiruna IF	6	1	0	0	0	5	19	32	3

=== Western Group ===
	Club	GP	W	OTW	T	OTL	L	GF	GA	Pts
1.	Borås HC	6	6	0	0	0	0	33	11	18
2.	Kristianstads IK	6	4	0	0	0	2	29	20	12
3.	Nacka HK	6	1	0	0	0	5	18	32	3
4.	Haninge HF	6	1	0	0	0	5	15	32	3

=== Eastern Group ===
	Club	GP	W	OTW	T	OTL	L	GF	GA	Pts
1.	Väsby IK	6	4	1	0	0	1	25	16	14
2.	Örebro HK	6	4	0	0	0	2	22	14	12
3.	Borlänge HF	6	2	0	0	1	3	19	24	7
4.	Tranås AIF	6	1	0	0	0	5	9	26	3

=== Southern Group ===
	Club	GP	W	OTW	T	OTL	L	GF	GA	Pts
1.	Tingsryds AIF	6	4	1	0	0	1	26	14	14
2.	IF Troja-Ljungby	6	3	1	1	0	1	24	13	12
3.	Skövde IK	6	1	1	0	1	3	22	24	6
4.	Enköpings SK	6	0	0	1	2	3	10	31	3

== Playoffs ==
- Kristianstads IK - Väsby IK 0:4/2:7
- Örebro HK - Piteå HC 3:5/1:2 OT
- AIK Härnösand - Tingsryds AIF 3:6/2:4
- IF Troja-Ljungby - Borås HC 1:6/1:2

== Qualification round ==
=== Division 1A ===
	Club	GP	W	OTW	T	OTL	L	GF	GA	Pts (Bonus)
1.	Tegs SK	6	3	1	0	0	2	20	14	13(4)
2.	Asplöven HC	6	3	0	0	0	3	17	15	12(3)
3.	Clemensnäs HC	6	3	0	0	0	3	14	22	10(1)
4.	Luleå Rebels HC	6	2	0	0	1	3	16	16	7(2)

=== Division 1B ===
	Club	GP	W	OTW	T	OTL	L	GF	GA	Pts (Bonus)
1.	Kovlands IF	6	5	0	0	0	1	23	12	17(2)
2.	Hudiksvalls HC	6	3	0	0	0	3	21	18	12(3)
3.	Örnsköldsviks SK	6	3	0	0	0	3	25	26	10(1)
4.	Kramfors	6	1	0	0	0	5	17	30	3(0)

=== Division 1C ===
	Club	GP	W	OTW	T	OTL	L	GF	GA	Pts (Bonus)
1.	Valbo AIF	6	5	0	0	0	1	22	12	18(3)
2.	Linden HC	6	4	0	1	0	1	20	10	17(4)
3.	Lindlövens IF	6	3	0	1	1	1	24	18	16(5)
4.	Tierps HK	6	2	0	0	0	4	22	24	12(6)
5.	Surahammars IF	6	3	0	1	0	2	24	19	11(1)
6.	Uppsala HC	6	1	1	1	0	3	11	16	8(2)
7.	Falu IF	6	25	0	0	0	6	9	33	0(0)

=== Division 1D ===
	Club	GP	W	OTW	T	OTL	L	GF	GA	Pts (Bonus)
1.	IK Hästen	6	5	0	0	0	1	28	16	21(6)
2.	Järfälla HC	6	5	0	0	0	1	25	14	19(4)
3.	Arlanda HC	6	3	1	0	0	2	18	16	14(3)
4.	Botkyrka HC	6	3	0	0	0	3	18	20	10(1)
5.	Mälarh./Bredäng	6	1	0	0	1	4	13	21	9(5)
6.	Vallentuna BK	6	2	0	0	0	4	15	24	8(2)
7.	Trångsunds IF	6	1	0	0	0	5	15	21	3(0)

=== Division 1E ===
	Club	GP	W	OTW	T	OTL	L	GF	GA	Pts (Bonus)
1.	Skåre BK	6	3	1	0	0	2	27	16	16(5)
2.	Mariestads BoIS	6	3	0	1	0	2	21	13	16(6)
3.	Sunne IK	6	4	0	0	0	2	17	12	16(4)
4.	IFK Kumla	6	4	0	0	0	2	25	18	14(2)
5.	Kungälvs IK	6	3	0	1	1	1	19	16	14(3)
6.	Grums IK	6	1	0	0	0	5	19	33	4(1)
7.	Motala AIF	6	1	0	0	0	5	13	33	3(0)

=== Division 1F ===
	Club	GP	W	OTW	T	OTL	L	GF	GA	Pts (Bonus)
1.	IK Pantern	6	5	0	0	0	1	46	18	20(5)
2.	Gislaveds SK	6	4	0	0	0	2	19	20	16(4)
3.	Olofströms IK	6	3	0	0	0	3	33	19	15(6)
4.	Helsingborgs HC	6	4	0	0	0	2	30	17	15(3)
5.	Mörrums GoIS	6	3	0	0	0	3	31	26	11(2)
6.	Jonstorps IF	6	1	0	0	0	5	13	47	4(1)
7.	Tyringe SoSS	6	1	0	0	0	5	16	41	3(0)

== Relegation ==
=== Division 1A ===
- Lycksele - Bodens HF 2:4/1:6

=== Division 1B ===
Kramfors qualified for the league.

=== Division 1C ===
Falu and Uppsala qualified for the league.

=== Division 1D ===
Skå was promoted to the league, while Vallentuna was relegated.

=== Division 1E ===
Hammarö and Munkfors were promoted to the league.

=== Division 1F ===
Göteborg and Ulricehamn were promoted to the league.
