= 1999–2000 Division 1 season (Swedish ice hockey) =

- League: Division 1
- Sport: Ice hockey
- Number of teams: 78
- Promoted to Division 1: Kiruna IF, Skåre BK, Avesta BK, Tierp IF, Mörrums GoIS
- Relegated to Division 2: Överkalix, Sollefteå, Njurunda, IFK Munkfors, Säffle HC, Sollent HC, Gnesta IK, Östervåla, IFK Täby, Haninge, Tyresö HK, Sudret HC, Lysekil, Tibro IK, Göteborg IK, Södra, HC Dalen, Västervik IK, HK Kings, Helsingborg HC, Kallinge-Ronneby IF

Division 1 seasons
- ← 1998–99 2000–01 →

1999–2000 was the first season that Division 1 functioned as the third-level of ice hockey in Sweden, below the second-level Allsvenskan and the top-level Elitserien (now the SHL).

== Format ==
The league was divided into four regional groups. In each region, the top teams qualified for a promotion round for the opportunity to be promoted to the Allsvenskan. The bottom teams in each group were forced to play in a relegation round in order to retain their spot in Division 1 for the following season. These were also conducted within each region.

== Season ==
=== Northern region ===
==== First round ====
===== Group A =====
	Club	GP	W	T	L	GF	GA	Pts
1.	Kiruna IF	28	21	2	5	145	69	44
2.	Tegs SK	28	17	2	9	114	92	36
3.	Lejon	28	15	3	10	119	97	33
4.	Brooklyn	28	14	1	13	113	111	29
5.	Clemensnäs	28	13	1	14	113	113	27
6.	Kalix	28	11	2	15	104	113	24
7.	Vännäs	28	9	6	13	112	118	24
8.	Överkalix	28	2	3	23	73	180	7

===== Group B =====
	Club	GP	W	T	L	GF	GA	Pts
1.	Örnsköldsviks SK	27	21	3	3	194	78	45
2.	AIK Härnösand	27	18	2	7	131	75	38
3.	Kovland	27	17	1	9	124	104	35
4.	KB 65	27	14	3	10	108	114	31
5.	Kramfors	27	12	6	9	117	95	30
6.	Östersunds IK	27	14	1	12	104	113	29
7.	Svedjeholmen	27	9	2	16	91	121	20
8.	LN 91	27	7	3	17	92	151	17
9.	Sollefteå	27	5	5	17	107	144	15
10.	Njurunda SK	27	2	6	19	89	162	10

==== Promotion round ====
	Club	GP	W	T	L	GF	GA	Pts
1.	Kiruna IF	6	5	1	0	33	13	11
2.	Örnsköldsviks SK	6	3	1	2	28	19	7
3.	Tegs SK	6	2	0	4	25	31	4
4.	AIK Härnösand	6	1	0	5	15	38	2

==== Relegation round ====
===== Group A =====
	Club	GP	W	T	L	GF	GA	Pts
1.	Vännäs	6	4	1	1	24	13	9
2.	Tuollavaara	6	3	2	1	23	19	8
3.	Överkalix	6	2	1	3	23	31	5
4.	Lycksele	6	1	0	5	18	25	2

===== Group B =====
	Club	GP	W	T	L	GF	GA	Pts
1.	LN 91	6	6	0	0	47	14	12
2.	Svedjeholmen	6	4	0	2	36	22	8
3.	Ånge	6	1	0	5	12	33	2
4.	Höga Kusten	6	1	0	5	13	38	2

=== Western region ===
==== First round ====
===== Group A =====
	Club	GP	W	T	L	GF	GA	Pts
1.	Avesta BK	18	12	4	2	104	44	28
2.	Borlänge HF	18	13	0	5	87	47	26
3.	Hille/Åbyggeby IK	18	10	2	6	83	73	22
4.	Skutskärs SK	18	10	2	6	73	69	22
5.	Hedemora SK	18	9	3	6	103	70	21
6.	Hudiksvall HC	18	8	1	9	63	77	17
7.	Valbo AIF	18	5	4	9	63	65	14
8.	IF Noretpojkarna	18	5	3	10	41	84	13
9.	Västerås HC	18	4	2	12	59	93	10
10.	Hofors HC	18	3	1	14	47	101	7

===== Group B =====
	Club	GP	W	T	L	GF	GA	Pts
1.	Skåre BK	18	13	4	1	103	45	30
2.	Arvika HC	18	12	4	2	82	46	28
3.	HC Örebro	18	11	4	3	91	43	26
4.	Hammarö HC	18	9	1	8	77	70	19
5.	Kristinehamns HT	18	7	3	8	80	72	17
6.	IFK Munkfors	18	7	2	9	65	69	16
7.	Surahammar IF	18	7	1	10	63	84	15
8.	Forshaga IF	18	4	5	9	48	77	13
9.	Åmåls SK	18	3	5	10	45	70	11
10.	Säffle HC	18	2	1	15	36	114	5

==== Promotion round ====
	Club	GP	W	T	L	GF	GA	Pts
1.	Skåre BK	14	9	2	3	57	40	20
2.	Avesta BK	14	7	3	4	50	39	17
3.	Borlänge HF	14	7	2	5	62	52	16
4.	Arvika HC	14	6	3	5	54	43	15
5.	HC Örebro	14	6	3	5	50	43	15
6.	Hille/Åbyggeby IK	14	4	4	6	46	46	12
7.	Skutskärs SK	14	4	1	9	39	70	9
8.	Hammarö HC	14	3	2	9	40	65	8

==== Relegation round ====
	Club	GP	W	T	L	GF	GA	Pts
1.	Nor IK	6	4	0	2	35	16	8
2.	Fagersta AIK	6	3	1	2	29	25	7
3.	IFK Munkfors	6	2	1	3	23	31	5
4.	Säffle HC	6	2	0	4	23	38	4

=== Eastern region ===
==== First round ====
===== Group A =====
	Club	GP	W	T	L	GF	GA	Pts
1.	Gimo IF	18	14	1	3	92	62	29
2.	Uppsala AIS	18	11	2	5	78	47	24
3.	Tierp IF	18	10	4	4	86	62	24
4.	Vallentuna BK	18	10	2	6	70	57	22
5.	Väsby IK	18	8	5	5	82	71	21
6.	IK Waxholm	18	8	2	8	77	75	18
7.	IFK Österåker	18	6	2	10	70	79	14
8.	Östervåla	18	4	2	12	51	75	10
9.	Sollent HC	18	4	2	12	67	99	10
10.	IFK Täby	18	3	2	13	46	92	8

===== Group B =====
	Club	GP	W	T	L	GF	GA	Pts
1.	Mälarhöjden/Bredäng	18	15	1	2	97	41	31
2.	Järfälla HC	18	11	4	3	75	49	26
3.	Tumba-Botkyrka	18	11	3	4	70	42	25
4.	Trångsund IF	18	11	2	5	75	55	24
5.	Eskilstuna WHT	18	8	5	5	49	47	21
6.	Nacka HK	18	6	5	7	56	67	17
7.	Tyresö HK	18	3	5	10	47	77	11
8.	Haninge	18	2	5	11	49	85	9
9.	Skå IK	18	2	4	12	51	75	8
10.	Gnesta IK	18	3	2	13	57	88	8

==== Second round ====
===== Main group =====
	Club	GP	W	T	L	GF	GA	Pts
1.	Vallentuna BK	14	10	2	2	65	41	22
2.	Mälarhöjden/Bredäng	14	9	1	4	50	42	19
3.	Tierp IF	14	7	3	4	57	41	17
4.	Järfälla HC	14	8	0	6	52	55	16
5.	Tumba-Botkyrka	14	6	2	6	44	40	14
6.	Uppsala AIS	14	6	0	8	52	53	12
7.	Gimo IF	14	4	2	8	52	58	10
8.	Trångsund IF	14	1	0	13	26	68	2

===== Qualification round =====
====== Group A ======
	Club	GP	W	T	L	GF	GA	Pts (Bonus)
1.	Väsby IK	16	11	1	4	78	58	28(5)
2.	IFK Österåker	16	8	1	7	67	59	20(3)
3.	Waxholm	16	5	4	7	68	65	18(4)
4.	Östervåla	16	6	2	8	54	53	16(2)
5.	IFK Täby	16	5	5	6	56	62	15(0)
6.	Sollent HC	16	3	2	11	60	74	9(1)

====== Group B ======
	Club	GP	W	T	L	GF	GA	Pts (Bonus)
1.	Skå IK	16	14	1	1	70	28	30(1)
2.	Eskilstuna WHT	16	9	3	4	52	47	26(5)
3.	Nacka HK	16	6	4	6	48	46	20(4)
4.	Haninge	16	6	4	6	47	54	18(2)
5.	Tyresö HK	16	5	2	9	53	81	15(3)
6.	Gnesta IK	16	3	1	12	50	86	7(0)

====== Final games ======
- Tierp IF - Väsby IK 2:2/4:2
- Järfälla HC - Skå IK 3:3/3:4

==== Promotion round ====
	Club	GP	W	T	L	GF	GA	Pts
1.	Tierp IF	6	3	2	1	19	10	8
2.	Vallentuna BK	6	3	2	1	15	16	8
3.	Mälarhöjden/Bredäng	6	3	0	3	20	16	6
4.	Skå IK	6	1	0	5	10	22	2

==== Relegation round ====
===== Group A =====
	Club	GP	W	T	L	GF	GA	Pts
1.	IK Tälje	6	4	1	1	20	15	9
2.	Östervåla	6	3	2	1	22	14	8
3.	IFK Täby	6	2	1	3	25	23	5
4.	IFK Salem	6	1	0	5	18	33	2

===== Group B =====
	Club	GP	W	T	L	GF	GA	Pts
1.	Sudret HC	6	5	0	1	22	12	10
2.	Haninge	6	4	0	2	23	15	8
3.	Tyresö HK	6	2	1	3	15	19	5
4.	Tullinge TP	6	0	1	5	7	21	1

===== Relegation game =====
- IK Tälje - Sudret HC 6:2/4:2

=== Southern region ===
==== First round ====
===== Group A =====
	Club	GP	W	T	L	GF	GA	Pts
1.	Mölndals IF	18	10	6	2	89	44	26
2.	Skövde IK	18	11	3	4	81	54	25
3.	Borås HC	18	10	4	4	65	43	24
4.	Vänersborg HC	18	8	7	3	72	49	23
5.	Nittorp IK	18	11	0	7	81	41	22
6.	Södra HC	18	9	3	6	79	69	21
7.	Hästen Hockey	18	7	3	8	66	68	17
8.	Kungälvs IK	18	6	2	10	61	88	14
9.	HK Kings	18	4	0	14	49	90	8
10.	Göteborg IK	18	0	0	18	34	131	0

===== Group B =====
	Club	GP	W	T	L	GF	GA	Pts
1.	Mörrums GoIS	18	12	2	4	73	41	26
2.	Nybro Vikings IF	18	11	4	3	83	52	26
3.	Tyringe SoS	18	9	5	4	56	47	23
4.	Olofström IK	18	8	6	4	78	47	22
5.	Kristianstad IK	18	9	2	7	69	53	20
6.	IK Pantern	18	9	1	8	66	62	19
7.	Limhamn HC	18	7	4	7	50	59	18
8.	Alvesta SK	18	7	1	10	64	79	15
9.	Helsingborg HC	18	3	2	13	42	77	8
10.	Västervik IK	18	1	1	16	28	92	2

==== Second round ====
===== Main group =====
	Club	GP	W	T	L	GF	GA	Pts
1.	Mölndals IF	14	9	3	2	54	32	21
2.	Mörrums GoIS	14	9	1	4	53	35	19
3.	Skövde IK	14	6	3	5	37	40	15
4.	Tyringe SoS	14	5	4	5	58	48	14
5.	Borås HC	14	5	4	5	37	39	14
6.	Nybro Vikings IF	14	5	0	9	47	52	10
7.	Olofström IK	14	5	0	9	43	55	10
8.	Vänersborg HC	14	4	1	9	29	57	9

==== Qualification round ====
===== Group A =====
	Club	GP	W	T	L	GF	GA	Pts
1.	Hästen Hockey	14	12	2	0	68	32	26
2.	Nittorp IK	14	9	2	3	66	39	20
3.	Halmstad	14	8	3	3	79	43	19
4.	Mariestads BoIS	14	7	1	6	54	42	15
5.	Södra HC	14	5	3	6	42	44	13
6.	Kungälvs IK	14	5	3	6	52	64	13
7.	HK Kinga	14	1	1	12	39	74	3
8.	Göteborg IK	14	1	1	12	25	87	3

===== Group B =====
	Club	GP	W	T	L	GF	GA	Pts
1.	IK Pantern	14	10	2	2	59	39	22
2.	Kristianstad IK	14	10	0	4	80	38	20
3.	Alvesta SK	14	9	1	4	52	47	19
4.	Limhamn HC	14	7	2	5	45	47	16
5.	Kalmar HC	14	6	0	8	55	51	12
6.	Helsingborg HC	14	3	3	8	28	40	9
7.	Kallinge-Ronneby IF	14	3	2	9	42	64	8
8.	Västervik IK	14	2	2	10	27	62	6

==== Final round ====
===== Group A =====
	Club	GP	W	T	L	GF	GA	Pts
1.	Skövde IK	6	3	3	0	21	14	9
2.	Nybro Vikings IF	6	3	1	2	19	20	7
3.	Kristianstads IK	6	1	2	3	19	17	4
4.	Hästen Hockey	6	1	2	3	17	25	4

===== Group B =====
	Club	GP	W	T	L	GF	GA	Pts
1.	Nittorp IK	28	23	2	3	21	11	10
2.	IK Pantern	28	15	7	6	22	18	8
3.	Tyringe SoS	28	15	4	9	14	20	5
4.	Borås HC	28	11	7	10	15	23	1

==== Promotion round ====
	Club	GP	W	T	L	GF	GA	Pts
1.	Mörrums GoIS	6	4	1	1	26	12	9
2.	Mölndals IF	6	3	1	2	22	18	7
3.	Nittorp IK	6	2	1	3	16	23	5
4.	Skövde IK	6	1	1	4	16	27	3

==== Relegation round ====
===== Group A =====
	Club	GP	W	T	L	GF	GA	Pts
1.	Kungälvs IK	6	4	0	2	29	23	8
2.	Lysekil	6	4	0	2	28	23	8
3.	Tibro IK	6	2	0	4	25	30	4
4.	Göteborg IK	6	2	0	4	18	24	4

===== Group B =====
	Club	GP	W	T	L	GF	GA	Pts
1.	Kalmar HC	6	5	0	1	23	25	10
2.	Södra	6	4	0	2	35	26	8
3.	HC Dalen	6	3	0	3	32	22	6
4.	Västervik IK	6	0	0	6	19	36	0

===== Group C =====
	Club	GP	W	T	L	GF	GA	Pts
1.	Jonstorp IF	6	4	1	1	27	15	9
2.	HK Kings	6	4	1	1	20	17	9
3.	Helsingborg HC	6	3	0	3	25	18	6
4.	Kallinge-Ronneby IF	6	0	0	6	13	35	0
