= Jimmie Ericsson =

Swedish ice hockey player (born 1980)

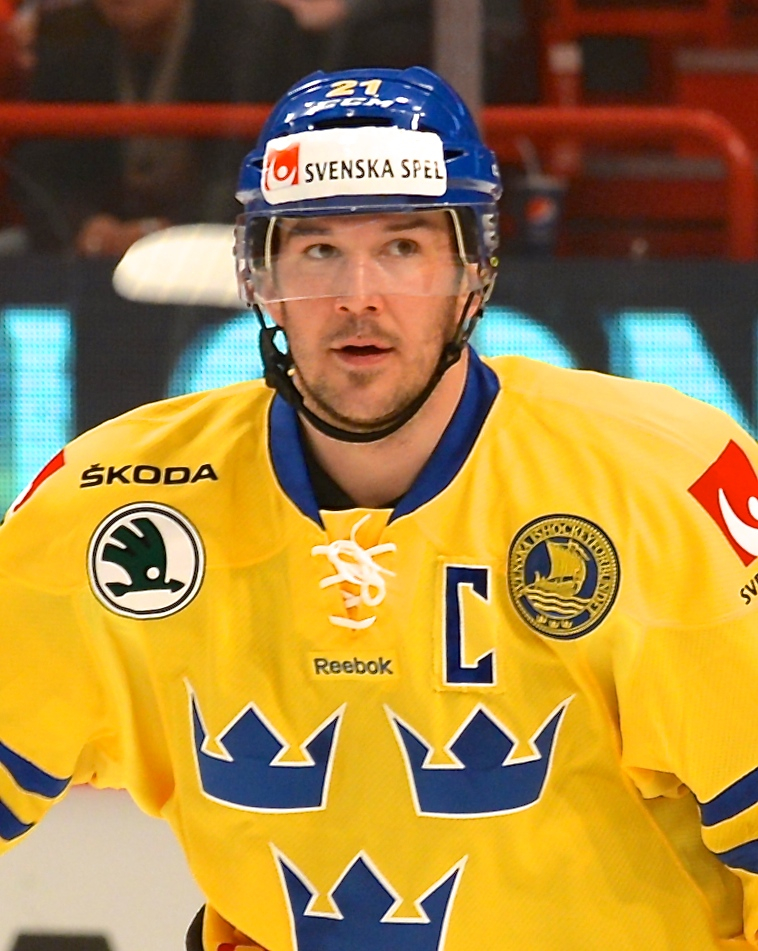
- Jimmie Ericsson playing for Team Sweden against Russia during the Sweden Hockey Games in Stockholm, Sweden in May 2014
- Born: 22 February 1980 (age 46) Skellefteå, Sweden
- Height: 6 ft 2 in (188 cm)
- Weight: 207 lb (94 kg; 14 st 11 lb)
- Position: Left wing
- Shot: Left
- Played for: Skellefteå AIK; Leksands IF; SKA Saint Petersburg
- National team: Sweden
- Playing career: 2001–2019

Jimmie Sven Ericsson (born 22 February 1980) is a Swedish former professional ice hockey Left wing who played for Skellefteå AIK of the Swedish Hockey League (SHL).

== Playing career ==
In 2013 Ericsson was awarded the Guldpucken and Peter Forsberg Trophy after a season where Skellefteå AIK won the Swedish Championship for the first time since 1978.

In 2014 Ericsson help lead Skellefteå AIK to the Swedish Championship for the second year in a row, becoming the first club to repeat as champions since Djurgårdens IF in 2000 and 2001. Ericsson was the third-leading scorer during the playoffs, recording twelve goals and two assists in fourteen games.

After 8 seasons in the SHL with Skellefteå, Ericsson opted for a new challenge in signing a one-year contract with Russian club, SKA Saint Petersburg of the KHL on 28 May 2014.

== International play ==
Medal record

Representing Sweden

Ice Hockey

Olympic Games
Silver medal – second place	2014 Sochi	

World Championships
Gold medal – first place	2013 Sweden/Finland	
Silver medal – second place	2011 Slovakia	
Bronze medal – third place	2010 Germany	
Bronze medal – third place	2014 Belarus	

Ericsson won a gold medal with Tre Kronor at the 2013 World Championship. Ericsson broke a rib in a preliminary game against Norway, but he continued to play in the remaining six games of the tournament.

Jimmie's younger brother Jonathan is a defenseman who is currently playing for the Detroit Red Wings. The Ericsson brothers were set to play together professionally for the first time at the 2010 World Championships. Following Detroit's elimination in the 2010 Stanley Cup playoffs, Jonathan joined Sweden's national team at the World Championships. The brothers were in the lineup together, however; Jimmie injured his knee on his first shift, and missed the rest of the tournament, so they were never on the ice together. The brothers played together for the first time at the 2014 Winter Olympics in Sochi, where they won the silver medal. Jimmie was the only non-NHL player on the team.

Ericsson represented Sweden at the 2014 IIHF World Championship, where he recorded two goals in ten games, and won a bronze medal. Ericsson represented Sweden at the 2015 IIHF World Championship, where he recorded two assists in eight games. Ericsson represented Sweden at the 2016 IIHF World Championship, where he captained the team, and recorded one goal and three assists in eight games.

== Career statistics ==
=== Regular season and playoffs ===
			Regular season					Playoffs
Season	Team	League	GP	G	A	Pts	PIM	GP	G	A	Pts	PIM
1997–98	Södertälje SK	SWE.2 U18
1998–99	Södertälje SK	J20
1998–99	Södertälje SK	Div.1	2	0	0	0	0	—	—	—	—	—
1999–2000	HC Vita Hästen	Div.1
2000–01	HC Vita Hästen	Div.1
2001–02	HC Vita Hästen	Div.1	31	13	24	37		—	—	—	—	—
2002–03	Skellefteå AIK	Allsv	39	6	11	17	65	10	2	4	6	0
2003–04	Skellefteå AIK	Allsv	42	9	16	25	126	10	3	3	6	8
2004–05	Skellefteå AIK	Allsv	45	14	23	37	93	9	4	5	9	18
2005–06	Leksands IF	SEL	40	3	6	9	64	—	—	—	—	—
2006–07	Skellefteå AIK	SEL	53	6	11	17	72	—	—	—	—	—
2007–08	Skellefteå AIK	SEL	44	4	11	15	69	5	0	0	0	4
2008–09	Skellefteå AIK	SEL	46	7	12	19	38	11	2	0	2	2
2009–10	Skellefteå AIK	SEL	46	17	14	31	24	12	2	2	4	10
2010–11	Skellefteå AIK	SEL	53	13	20	33	34	18	6	5	11	20
2011–12	Skellefteå AIK	SEL	45	10	21	31	40	19	7	9	16	38
2012–13	Skellefteå AIK	SEL	45	8	27	35	22	13	3	2	5	10
2013–14	Skellefteå AIK	SHL	48	13	16	29	68	14	12	2	14	12
2014–15	SKA Saint Petersburg	KHL	56	13	10	23	40	22	3	4	7	16
2015–16	Skellefteå AIK	SHL	37	8	15	23	59	15	3	7	10	20
2016–17	Skellefteå AIK	SHL	42	10	11	21	47	6	1	1	2	4
2017–18	SK Lejon	Div.1	1	1	1	2	0	—	—	—	—	—
2017–18	Skellefteå AIK	SHL	17	1	4	5	14	16	4	3	7	30
2018–19	Skellefteå AIK	SHL	42	8	11	19	28	—	—	—	—	—
SHL totals			558	108	179	287	579	129	40	31	71	175

=== International ===
Year	Team	Event	Result	GP	G	A	Pts	PIM
2010	Sweden	WC	3rd place, bronze medalist(s)	3	0	0	0	4
2011	Sweden	WC	2nd place, silver medalist(s)	8	2	1	3	2
2013	Sweden	WC	1st place, gold medalist(s)	7	1	0	1	6
2014	Sweden	OG	2nd place, silver medalist(s)	6	1	1	2	6
2014	Sweden	WC	3rd place, bronze medalist(s)	10	2	0	2	12
2015	Sweden	WC	5th	8	0	2	2	2
2016	Sweden	WC	6th	8	1	3	4	10
Senior totals				50	7	8	15	42

== Awards and honors ==
Award	Year
SHL
Guldpucken	2013
Le Mat Trophy (Skellefteå AIK)	2013, 2014

== See also ==
- List of Olympic medalist families

Awards and achievements
Preceded by Jakob Silfverberg	Winner of the Guldpucken; 2013	Succeeded by Joakim Lindström
