= Tony Lagerström =

Swedish ice hockey player

- Born: July 19, 1988 (age 38) Stockholm, Sweden
- Height: 6 ft 1 in (185 cm)
- Weight: 191 lb (87 kg; 13 st 9 lb)
- Position: Left wing
- Shoots: Left
- Div.2 team Former teams: Gnesta IK; Södertälje SK
- NHL draft: 76th overall, 2006; Chicago Blackhawks
- Playing career: 2005–present

Tony Lagerström (born July 19, 1988) is a Swedish professional ice hockey player. He is currently playing with Gnesta IK in the Hockeytvåan, the fourth highest division of hockey in Sweden.

He was drafted by the Chicago Blackhawks in the third round of the 2006 NHL entry draft, 76th overall. He began his youth career with Tullinge TP. He played a solitary game in the Swedish Hockey League with Södertälje SK during the 2005–06 season.

== Career statistics ==
=== Regular season and playoffs ===
			Regular season					Playoffs
Season	Team	League	GP	G	A	Pts	PIM	GP	G	A	Pts	PIM
2003–04	Huddinge IK	J18 Allsv	12	5	1	6	6	—	—	—	—	—
2004–05	Södertälje SK	J18 Allsv	2	3	2	5	4	1	0	0	0	0
2004–05	Södertälje SK	J20	28	13	11	24	16	3	2	1	3	2
2005–06	Södertälje SK	J18 Allsv	7	9	5	14	2	1	0	0	0	0
2005–06	Södertälje SK	J20	37	14	19	33	69	4	1	2	3	14
2005–06	Södertälje SK	SEL	1	0	0	0	0	—	—	—	—	—
2006–07	Södertälje SK	J20	23	7	11	18	16	3	0	3	3	6
2006–07	Södertälje SK	Allsv	33	0	1	1	2	3	0	0	0	0
2007–08	Södertälje SK	J20	3	1	2	3	0	—	—	—	—	—
2007–08	Huddinge IK	Allsv	30	8	4	12	28	—	—	—	—	—
2008–09	Mora IK	Allsv	45	12	18	30	14	3	0	0	0	0
2009–10	Mora IK	Allsv	52	12	15	27	14	2	1	3	4	0
2010–11	Mora IK	Allsv	51	8	14	22	12	10	1	1	2	4
2011–12	Södertälje SK	Allsv	46	9	14	23	16	—	—	—	—	—
2012–13	Södertälje SK	Allsv	51	2	10	12	18	6	0	0	0	2
2013–14	Åker/Strängnäs HC	SWE.3	34	16	44	60	16	—	—	—	—	—
2013–14	Falu IF	SWE.3	1	0	0	0	0	—	—	—	—	—
2014–15	Åker/Strängnäs HC	SWE.3	33	13	37	50	28	2	1	1	2	0
2015–16	Åker/Strängnäs HC	SWE.3	35	17	46	63	14	2	0	1	1	0
2016–17	Åker/Strängnäs HC	SWE.3	24	4	18	22	20	—	—	—	—	—
2017–18	Gnesta IK	SWE.6	10	10	15	25	0	—	—	—	—	—
2018–19	Gnesta IK	SWE.5	31	41	71	112	14	—	—	—	—	—
2019–20	Gnesta IK	SWE.4	28	16	33	49	26	—	—	—	—	—
2021–22	Gnesta IK	SWE.6	4	9	9	18	0	1	3	6	9	0
Allsv totals			308	51	76	127	104	24	2	4	6	6
SWE.3 totals			127	50	145	195	78	4	1	2	3	0

=== International ===
Year	Team	Event	GP	G	A	Pts	PIM
2004	Sweden	U18	5	1	1	2	4
2005	Sweden	U18	5	2	1	3	4
2006	Sweden	WJC18	6	3	3	6	10
2008	Sweden	WJC	6	3	3	6	4
Junior totals			22	9	8	17	22
