= Roni Viirlas =

Finnish ice hockey player

- Born: May 20, 1993 (age 32) Turku, Finland
- Height: 6 ft 3 in (191 cm)
- Weight: 209 lb (95 kg; 14 st 13 lb)
- Position: Defence
- Shoots: Left
- Hockeyettan team Former teams: Borås HC; Lukko
- Playing career: 2013–present

Roni Viirlas (born May 20, 1993) is a Finnish ice hockey defenceman. He is currently playing for Borås HC of the Hockeyettan.

Viirlas made his SM-liiga debut playing with Lukko during the 2012–13 SM-liiga season.

== Awards and honours ==
Honours	Year
Jr. A SM-Liiga All-Star Team	2012–13
