= Robin Byström =

Swedish ice hockey player

- Born: March 3, 1995 (age 30) Örnsköldsvik, Sweden
- Height: 5 ft 8 in (173 cm)
- Weight: 161 lb (73 kg; 11 st 7 lb)
- Position: Left wing
- Shoots: Left
- Hockeyettan team Former teams: Borlänge HF; Modo Hockey
- NHL draft: Undrafted
- Playing career: 2013–present

Robin Byström (born March 3, 1995) is a Swedish ice hockey player. He is currently playing with Borlänge HF of the Hockeyettan.

Byström played three games in the Swedish Hockey League for Modo Hockey during the 2013–14 SHL season.
