= Mattias Remstam =

Swedish ice hockey player

- Born: January 25, 1975 (age 51) Nittorp, SWE
- Height: 6 ft 2 in (188 cm)
- Weight: 214 lb (97 kg; 15 st 4 lb)
- Position: Right wing
- Shoots: Left
- Swe-2 team Former teams: Borås HC; HV71 (SEL)
- Playing career: 1999–present

Mattias Remstam (born January 25, 1975, in Nittorp, Sweden) is a professional Swedish ice hockey player, currently playing for Borås HC in the Swedish tier two division HockeyAllsvenskan.

== Playing career ==
Remstam is big, physical player who often uses his 214 pounds on the ice. He has got good scoring abilities but has from 2006 to 2007 suffered from several injuries. He started playing ice hockey with his hometown hockey club Nittorps IK in the Swedish tier four league system. After seven seasons with the club he was picked up by the Elitserien club HV71 and played for them from 1999 to 2008.

During HV71's last pre-season training match against Södertälje SK Remstam was hit by a hip tackle from Stefan Bemström. Remstam fell to the ice with an injured knee and a cut to his forehead. Later it was concluded that he had suffered a concussion and probably one of his ligaments in the knee was badly injured On October 4, 2006, Remstam played his first 2006–07 Elitserien game after a quick recovery. After five games of season 2007–08, Remstam broke his contract with HV71 due to lacking motivation of playing ice hockey on a professional level. He finished the season, first with KalPa in the Finnish SM-liiga and then Nordsjælland Cobras in the Danish Oddset Ligaen. In the 2008–09 pre-season he signed with Borås HC in the Swedish tier two division HockeyAllsvenskan.

== Awards ==
- Played in the Elitserien All-Star Game in 2000 and 2001.
- Elitserien playoff winner with HV71 in 2004.

== Career statistics ==
			Regular season					Playoffs
Season	Team	League	GP	G	A	Pts	PIM	GP	G	A	Pts	PIM
1999–00	HV71	SEL	41	13	11	24	35	6	0	1	1	20
2000–01	HV71	SEL	43	11	14	25	49	--	--	--	--	--
2001–02	HV71	SEL	37	8	9	17	16	8	2	0	2	12
2002–03	HV71	SEL	33	3	8	11	26	7	2	0	2	12
2003–04	HV71	SEL	46	9	17	26	75	17	3	4	7	18
2004–05	HV71	SEL	20	2	2	4	24	--	--	--	--	--
2005–06	HV71	SEL	46	11	11	22	86	12	0	1	1	20
2006–07	HV71	SEL	45	5	4	9	40	11	0	1	1	12
2007–08	HV71	SEL	5	0	0	0	0	--	--	--	--	--
2007–08	KalPa	SM-l	15	0	3	3	39	--	--	--	--	--
2007–08	Nordsjælland Cobras	Den	22	5	11	16	88	4	0	0	0	8
2008–09	Borås HC	SWE1	36	6	17	23	52	--	--	--	--	--
SEL totals			311	62	76	128	351	61	7	7	14	94

Statistics as of end of season 2007–08
