= Tegs SK Hockey =

- City: Umeå, Sweden
- League: (Sweden) Division 1
- Division: Norra
- Founded: 1898
- Home arena: T3 Center
- Colors: Red, white

The ice hockey section of Umeå-based Swedish sports club Tegs SK currently (as of the 2013–14 season) plays in Division 1, the third tier of ice hockey in Sweden. The club had its greatest success in 1967 when it managed promotion to the previous Division 1 which was at the time the top-tier hockey league in Sweden. Their time in the top flight was short-lived however, as they were relegated again after the 1967–68 season. More recently, the club played two seasons (2003–2005) in Sweden's second-tier Allsvenskan before being relegated back down to Division 1 in its current format as Sweden's third-tier league.

Tegs SK plays their home matches in T3 Center, a venue they share with HockeyAllsvenskan's IF Björklöven.
