= IK Waxholm =

- City: Vaxholm, Sweden
- Operated: 1993–Present
- Colors: red, blue
- Website: https://www.svenskalag.se/ikwaxholm

IK Waxholm is a Swedish ice hockey club based in the city of Vaxholm

== History ==
Founded in 1993, Waxholm initially played in Hockeytrean, which was then the 4th-level of professional hockey in Sweden. In its 5th season, the team was able to earn a promotion to Hockeytvåan. Two years later, Swedish hockey had a league realignment and Waxholm was moved to Division 1, though they still remained a 3rd-tier club. In 2002, after posting a deplorable 1–13 record, the team was dropped back to Hockeytrean which had become a 5th-tier league in the interim. Waxholm sunk even further when they were relegated to Division 4 (6th-tier) in 2006 and, though they briefly recovered, the club remained there for over a decade. In 2018, Waxholm earned a promotion back to Hockeytrean and nearly earned another promotion in 2023.

== Season records ==
Last 5 seasons
Note: W = Wins, L = Losses, OTW = Overtime Wins, OTL = Overtime losses, Pts = Points, GF = Goals for, GA = Goals against

Season	League	Tier	GP	W	L	OTW	OTL	Pts	PCT	GF	GA
2018–19	Hockeytrean	5th	12	5	5	1	1	18	.500	45	49
2019–20	Hockeytrean	5th	14	3	10	1	0	11	.286	34	61
2020–21	Hockeytrean	5th	4	1	3	0	0	3	.250	17	23
2021–22	Hockeytrean	5th	14	8	6	0	0	24	.571	48	24
2022–23	Hockeytrean	5th	20	17	0	2	1	56	.950	120	43
