= Kvalserien (HockeyAllsvenskan) =

Swedish ice hockey tournament

- Current season, competition or edition: 2014 HockeyAllsvenskan Kvalserien
- Sport: Ice hockey
- Founded: 2001
- No. of teams: 6
- Country: Sweden
- Most recent champions: HC Vita Hästen, IF Björklöven
- Promotion to: HockeyAllsvenskan
- Relegation to: Hockeyettan
- Website: Kvalserien @ HockeyAllsvenskan.se

Kvalserien, also known as Kvalserien till HockeyAllsvenskan, is the name of the Swedish round-robin ice hockey tournament to qualify for play in the next season of HockeyAllsvenskan (formerly named Allsvenskan), Sweden's second highest ice hockey league for men.

== Teams ==
Kvalserien is formed after the regular seasons of HockeyAllsvenskan and Hockeyettan (formerly named Division 1) are played. Prior to 2006, the two worst ranked teams in Allsvenskan Södra Vår and Allsvenskan Norra Vår, and the two best ranked teams in each Division 1 series, formed the leagues (one qualification league for the southern Allsvenskan, and another for the northern Allsvenskan). However, since 2006, the two worst ranked teams in HockeyAllsvenskan, and the four winning teams in the Division 1 playoffs, form the league. The six teams play each other twice, once at home and once on the road, for a total of 10 games per team and a total of 30 games. The teams finishing first and second are promoted to HockeyAllsvenskan the next season, while the other four teams play in Division 1 the following season.

The exception was the 2009 HockeyAllsvenskan Kvalserien, when the teams ranked 14th and 15th in HockeyAllsvenskan, and the four winning teams in the Division 1 playoffs, formed the league. The worst ranked team in HockeyAllsvenskan was automatically relegated to Division 1, and only the best team in the 2009 HockeyAllsvenskan Kvalserien was promoted to HockeyAllsvenskan, to allow a change in HockeyAllsvenskan from 16 to 14 teams.

Although Allsvenskan (currently named HockeyAllsvenskan) was formed in the 1999–2000 season, no Kvalserien was played in 2000; instead, the four worst teams in Allsvenskan were relegated to Division 1 while the four best teams in Division 1 were promoted to Allsvenskan.

== Previous winners ==
- 2001 - Halmstad Hammers HC, HC Örebro 90; Huddinge IK, Almtuna IS
- 2002 - Nybro Vikings IF, Mörrums IK; IF Vallentuna BK, Örnsköldsviks SK
- 2003 - Växjö Lakers HC, IF Troja/Ljungby; Almtuna IS, Tegs SK
- 2004 - IF Troja/Ljungby, Skövde IK; Uppsala Hockey, Tegs SK
- 2005 - AIK, Nybro Vikings IF; IFK Arboga IK, IF Sundsvall Hockey
- 2006 - Huddinge IK, IFK Arboga IK, Hammarby IF
- 2007 - Huddinge IK, Borås HC
- 2008 - IF Troja/Ljungby, Mariestad BoIS HC, Huddinge IK
- 2009 - Örebro HK
- 2010 - IK Oskarshamn, Tingsryds AIF, IF Sundsvall Hockey
- 2011 - IF Troja/Ljungby, Tingsryds AIF
- 2012 - Karlskrona HK, Asplöven HC (Borås HC relegated due to no elite license)
- 2013 - IF Björklöven, Karlskrona HK
- 2014 - HC Vita Hästen, IF Björklöven

== Previous seasons ==
=== 2001 season ===
Halmstad Hammers HC, HC Örebro 90, Huddinge IK, and Almtuna IS were promoted to Allsvenskan. IFK Kumla, IF Mölndal Hockey, Tierps HK, and IF Vallentuna BK were relegated to Division 1.

=== 2013 season ===
IF Björklöven returned to HockeyAllsvenskan after a three-year absence, and Karlskrona HK remained in the second-tier league for the 2013–14 season. Tingsryds AIF were relegated to Division 1.
