= Älvsby IF =

Swedish football club

- Full name: Älvsby Idrottsförening
- Ground: Älvåkra IP; Älvsbyn; Sweden
- League: Division 4 Norrbotten Södra
Home colours

Älvsby IF is a Swedish football club located in Älvsbyn.

== Background ==
Älvsby IF currently plays in Division 4 Norrbotten Södra which is the sixth tier of Swedish football. They play their home matches at the Älvåkra IP in Älvsbyn.

The club is affiliated to Norrbottens Fotbollförbund.

== Season to season ==
Season	Level	Division	Section	Position	Movements
1993	Tier 4	Division 3	Norra Norrland	9th	
1994	Tier 4	Division 3	Norra Norrland	10th	Relegated
1995	Tier 5	Division 4	Norrbotten Södra	3rd	
1996	Tier 5	Division 4	Norrbotten Södra	6th	
1997	Tier 5	Division 4	Norrbotten Södra	1st	Promoted
1998	Tier 4	Division 3	Norra Norrland	9th	Relegation Playoffs – Relegated
1999	Tier 5	Division 4	Norrbotten Södra	3rd	
2000	Tier 5	Division 4	Norrbotten Södra	1st	Promoted
2001	Tier 4	Division 3	Norra Norrland	2nd	Promotion Playoffs – Promoted
2002	Tier 3	Division 2	Norrland	12th	Relegated
2003	Tier 4	Division 3	Norra Norrland	12th	Relegated
2004	Tier 5	Division 4	Norrbotten Södra	6th	
2005	Tier 5	Division 4	Norrbotten Södra	5th	
2006*	Tier 6	Division 4	Norrbotten Södra	4th	
2007	Tier 6	Division 4	Norrbotten Södra	1st	Promoted
2008	Tier 5	Division 3	Norra Norrland	11th	Relegated
2009	Tier 6	Division 4	Norrbotten Södra	6th	
2010	Tier 6	Division 4	Norrbotten Södra	4th	
2011	Tier 6	Division 4	Norrbotten Södra	3rd	Promotion Playoffs

* League restructuring in 2006 resulted in a new division being created at Tier 3 and subsequent divisions dropping a level.
