= Tierps HK =

- City: Tierp, Uppsala County, Sweden
- League: (Sweden) Division 1
- Division: 1C
- Founded: 1957
- Home arena: Vegahallen
- Colors: Red, black
- Website: www2.idrottonline.se/TierpsHK-Ishockey

Tierps HK is a Swedish ice hockey club, based in Tierp, Uppsala County. The club, which was founded in 1957, played two seasons in Sweden's second-tier hockey league 2000–2002, but since then has been playing in the third-tier league, Division 1.
