= Värmdö HC =

- City: Värmdö, Stockholm, Sweden
- League: Hockeytvåan
- Division: East
- Founded: 1975
- Home arena: Ekhallen (capacity 500)
- Colors: Dark blue, red, white
- Head coach: (Sweden) Johan Sörman
- Captain: Marcus Milemark
- Website: Official website

Franchise history
- 1975–present: Värmdö HC

Värmdö HC, also known as Värmdö Hockey, is a Swedish ice hockey club located on the island of Värmdö. The club will play the 2017 –18 season in group East of Hockeytvåan, the fourth tier of Swedish ice hockey. The club plays its home games in Ekhallen, which has a capacity of 500 spectators.
