= Kovlands Ishockeyförening =

Kovlands Ishockeyförening Kovlands IshF
- City: Kovland, Sweden
- League: Hockeyettan
- Division: Norra
- Founded: 2000 split from 1903–founded Kovlands IF
- Home arena: Ånäshallen
- Colors: Blue, white, red
- Website: www.svenskalag.se/kovlandhockey

Franchise history
- 1903–2000: Kovlands IF
- 2000–present: Kovlands IshF

Kovlands Ishockeyförening (English: Kovlands Ice Hockey Club, also called Kovland Hockey, abbreviated "Kovlands IshF" or "KIF") is a Swedish ice hockey club founded in 2000 when the ice hockey section of Kovlands IF split off to form an independent club. The team played in Hockeyettan, the third tier of ice hockey in Sweden, but withdrew from the league in 2016 for play in lower divisions for financial reasons.
