= Skå IK =

Swedish football club

- Full name: Skå Idrottsklubb
- Founded: 1934
- Ground: Svanängens IP; Skå; Sweden
- Chairman: Finn Dobson
- League: Division 4 Stockholm Mellersta
Home colours

Skå IK is a Swedish football club located in Skå in Ekerö Municipality.

== Background ==
Skå IK currently plays in Division 4 Stockholm Mellersta which is the sixth tier of Swedish football. They play their home matches at the Svanängens IP in Skå.

The club is affiliated to Stockholms Fotbollförbund.

== Season to season ==
Season	Level	Division	Section	Position	Movements
2006*	Tier 8	Division 6	Stockholm B	1st	Promoted
2007	Tier 7	Division 5	Stockholm Mellersta	4th	
2008	Tier 7	Division 5	Stockholm Mellersta	3rd	Promoted
2009	Tier 6	Division 4	Stockholm Mellersta	7th	
2010	Tier 6	Division 4	Stockholm Mellersta	3rd	
2011	Tier 6	Division 4	Stockholm Mellersta	4th	

* League restructuring in 2006 resulted in a new division being created at Tier 3 and subsequent divisions dropping a level.
