= Gnesta IK =

Swedish ice hockey team

- City: Gnesta, Sweden
- League: Division 3
- Founded: 1972
- Home arena: Gnesta Ishall
- Colors: Blue and white
- General manager: (Sweden) Jörgen Ahlbom
- Head coach: (Sweden) Per Theorén
- Captain: (Sweden) Rasmus Ahlbom
- Website: www.laget.se/gnestaik

Gnesta IK, also known as the Gnesta Ishockeyklubb, formerly Gnesta Bluewings, is an ice hockey club based in Gnesta, Sweden, founded in 1972. Following a poor finish in the 2013–14 Division 1 season, Gnesta chose not to participate in the Division 1 qualifiers due to the state of their finances following rink fee hikes, and as such Gnesta were relegated to Division 2 starting in the 2014–15 season. During the 2022-2023 season, the team played in the Division 4 and won which promoted them to play in the Division 3 the following season. 2023-2024 marked a new era for the club, walking away from the Bluewings name and logo to go for a completely new look and back to the traditional name. Gnesta IK finished the season one point shy from advancing to the Division 2.
