= Hedemora SK =

Swedish hockey club

- City: Hedemora, Sweden
- League: HockeyTrean
- Division: 1C
- Founded: 1930
- Home arena: Sparbankshallen
- Colors: White, red
- General manager: (Sweden) Jonas Suvanto
- Head coach: (Sweden) Alf Spolander
- Website: www.laget.se/hskalaget

Hedemora SK is a Swedish hockey club located in the town of Hedemora in Dalarna. The club's A-team currently competes in the 3C-group of HockeyTrean, the fifth tier of Swedish hockey.
