= Hudiksvalls HC =

Hudikvalls HC
- City: Hudiksvall, Sweden
- League: Hockeyettan
- Founded: 1978
- Home arena: Glysishallen
- Colors: Red, black, white
- Head coach: (Sweden) Fredrik Johansson
- Captain: (Sweden) Magnus Nilsson
- Website: hockeyettan.se/hudikhockey

Hudiksvalls Hockey Club (or Hudiksvalls HC) is a Swedish hockey club based in Hudiksvall. The team currently plays in group 1C of Division 1, the third tier of Swedish ice hockey. Hudiksvalls HC was founded in 1978. Since the 1999/2000 season, the team has regularly participated in the third-rate Division 1, which is now called Hockeyettan.
