= IK Pantern =

Swedish ice hockey club

- City: Malmö, Sweden
- League: Hockeyettan
- Founded: 1959
- Dissolved: 2019 and 2025.
- Home arena: Kirsebergs Ishall
- Colors

Ishockeyklubben Pantern, also known as IK Pantern, were a Swedish ice hockey club based in Malmö. They formerly play in Hockeyettan, the third tier of ice hockey in Sweden. they were reformed in 2019.

== History ==
IK Pantern was founded in 1959. On June 23, 1960, the association's first annual meeting was held, whereby Göran Pettersson was elected chairman with Jan Magnusson as deputy, treasurer Lars-Erik Hansson and secretary Berth Danefors with Kjell Olofsson as deputy. The first official match of the Panther was played in December 1960 and ended with a 8-1 victory in over Lund IS.

The club was in danger of facing an automatic relegation prior to the 2019–20 season due to having insufficient funds in order to meet the requirements to play in HockeyAllsvenskan and later withdrew its place in the league. The league allowed Almtuna IS to fill the void left by IK Pantern. On 7 June 2019, The club IK Pantern filed for bankruptcy.

== Season-by-season records ==
| Season | Level | Division | Record | | Avg. home atnd. | Notes | Ref. |
| Season | Level | Division | Position | W-T-L W-OT-L | Avg. home atnd. | Notes | Ref. |
|---|---|---|---|---|---|---|---|
| 2011–12 | Tier 3 | Division 1F | 8th of 10 | 9–1–2–15 | 115 | | |
| 2011–12 | Tier 3 | Division 1F (spring) | 5th of 6 | 4–0–2–9 | 138 | | |
| 2011–12 | Division 1 qualifier F | | 2nd of 5 | 1-0-0-7 | | | |
| 2012–13 | Tier 3 | Division 1F | 8th of 11 | 11–1–4–14 | 89 | | |
| 2012–13 | Tier 3 | Division 1F (spring) | 3rd of 7 | 6–1–1–4 | 113 | | |
| 2013–14 | Tier 3 | Division 1F | 7th of 11 | 12–2–2–14 | 137 | | |
| 2013–14 | Tier 3 | Division 1F (spring) | 5th of 7 | 5–1–1–5 | 136 | | |
| 2014–15 | Tier 3 | HockeyEttan South | 2nd of 12 | 14–3–0–5 | 215 | | |
| 2014–15 | Tier 3 | AllEttan South | 1st of 8 | 9–1–1–3 | 390 | | |
| 2014–15 | HockeyAllsvenskan qualifiers | | 3rd of 6 | 5–1–0–4 | 506 | ▲ Promoted to HockeyAllsvenskan | |
| 2015–16 | Tier 2 | HockeyAllsvenskan | 10th of 14 | 21–2–6–23 | 625 | | |
| 2016–17 | Tier 2 | HockeyAllsvenskan | 4th of 14 | 22–7–9–14 | 912 | | |
| 2016–17 | Tier 2 | Playoffs | 3rd of 6 | 2–0–0–3 | 942 | | |
| 2017–18 | Tier 2 | HockeyAllsvenskan | 6th of 14 | 18–10–5–19 | 601 | | |
| 2017–18 | Tier 2 | Playoffs | 6th of 6 | 0–0–2–3 | 482 | | |
| 2018–19 | Tier 2 | HockeyAllsvenskan | 11th of 14 | 16–6–5–25 | 394 | Filed for Bankruptcy | |
