= Skövde IK =

- City: Skövde, Sweden
- League: (Sweden) Division 1 as of the 2013–14 season
- Division: 1E
- Founded: 1957
- Home arena: Billingehov
- Colors: Red, gold, blue
- Website: www.skovdeik.se

Skövde IK is an ice hockey club from Skövde, Sweden that was founded in 1957. The club played one season in Allsvenskan, Sweden's second-highest hockey league, in 2004–05. As of the 2013–14 season, they compete in Division 1, the third tier of ice hockey in Sweden.
