= Tegs SK =

Swedish football club

Teg SK
- Full name: Tegs Sportklubb
- Founded: 1898 as Tegs SK
- Ground: Umeå Energi Arena, Umeå; Sweden
- Capacity: 5,000
- League: Division 4 Södra
Home colours	Away colours

Tegs SK is a Swedish football club located in Umeå. The club was founded in 1898.

== Background ==
Tegs SK is a sports club that was founded in 1898. The club has specialised in ice-hockey, football and orienteering. In 1987 the club's football section was merged with the football section of Sandåkerns SK to become Umeå FC. However Tegs SK has re-introduced its football programme.

== Football ==
Since their foundation Tegs SK has participated mainly in the lower divisions of the Swedish football league system. The club currently plays in Division 4 Södra Västerbotten. They play their home matches at the Tegstunets IP in Umeå.

The club is affiliated to the Västerbottens Fotbollförbund.

=== Season to season ===
Season	Level	Division	Section	Position	Movements
1999	Tier 6	Division 5	Västerbotten Södra	3rd	
2000	Tier 6	Division 5	Västerbotten Södra	8th	
2001	Tier 6	Division 5	Västerbotten Södra	1st	Promoted
2002	Tier 5	Division 4	Västerbotten Södra	10th	
2003	Tier 5	Division 4	Västerbotten Södra	9th	
2004	Tier 5	Division 4	Västerbotten Södra	8th	
2005	Tier 5	Division 4	Västerbotten Södra	8th	
2006*	Tier 6	Division 4	Västerbotten Södra	9th	
2007	Tier 6	Division 4	Västerbotten Södra	3rd	
2008	Tier 6	Division 4	Västerbotten Södra	1st	Promoted
2009	Tier 5	Division 3	Norra Norrland	1st	Promoted
2010	Tier 4	Division 2	Norrland	12th	Relegated
2011	Tier 5	Division 3	Mellersta Norrland	1st	Promoted
2012	Tier 4	Division 2	Norrland	10th	Relegated
2013	Tier 5	Division 3	Norra Norrland	1st	Promoted
2014	Tier 4	Division 2	Norrland	6th	
2015	League position taken by Team TG FF				
2016	Tier 7	Division 5	Västerbotten Södra	7th	
2017	Tier 7	Division 5	Västerbotten Södra	2nd	Promoted
2018	Tier 6	Division 4	Västerbotten Södra	1st	Not Promoted!?
2019	Tier 6	Division 4	Västerbotten Södra	2nd	Promotion Playoffs - Promoted
2020	Tier 5	Division 3	Norra Norrland		

* League restructuring in 2006 resulted in a new division being created at Tier 3 and subsequent divisions dropping a level.

=== Attendances ===
In recent seasons Tegs SK have had the following average attendances:

Season	Average attendance	Division / Section	Level
2008	Not available	Div 4 Västerbotten Södra	Tier 6
2009	135	Div 3 Norra Norrland	Tier 5
2010	168	Div 2 Norrland	Tier 4

* Attendances are provided in the Publikliga sections of the Svenska Fotbollförbundet website.

== Ice hockey ==
See Tegs SK (ice hockey).
