= Borlänge HF =

Borlänge HF Borlänge Hockeyförening
- City: Borlänge, Dalarna, Sweden
- League: Hockeyettan
- Division: West
- Founded: 1961 as IF Tunabro; 1993 under its current name
- Home arena: Borlänge Ishall
- Colors: Navy, white, yellow, red
- General manager: (Sweden) Mats Johansson
- Head coach: (Sweden) Christer Sjöberg
- Captain: (Sweden) Daniel Eklund
- Website: www1.idrottonline.se/BorlangeHF-Ishockey

Borlänge Hockeyförening (literally Borlänge Hockey Association) or Borlänge HF is a Swedish ice hockey club located in Borlänge. The club has origins in IF Tunabro, founded in 1961, which played three seasons in Sweden's top hockey league (then called Division I) from 1971 but in 1974 was demoted to the second tier (then called Division 1) and in 1977 was further demoted to the third tier (then Division 2). This created a situation where three Borlänge teams played in the same league, resulting in a series of mergers ending in 1981. The unified club was given its current name in 1993.

Borlänge HF currently plays in the West group of Hockeyettan, the third tier of Swedish ice hockey.
