= Borås HC =

Borås Hockey
- City: Borås, Sweden
- League: Hockeyettan
- Founded: 1969
- Home arena: Borås Ishall (capacity 3,700)
- Colours: Red, Blue, White
- Head coach: (Sweden) Johan Hellström
- Website: www.borashockey.se

Borås HC is a Swedish professional ice hockey club, based in Borås, currently playing in HockeyEttan in Sweden.

The club played constantly in the second-tier league HockeyAllsvenskan between 2007 and 2012, but due to economical problems the Board of HockeyAllsvenskan announced on 27 June 2012 that they would not grant Borås HC elite license for the 2012–13 season and the club was therefore relegated to Division 1. They appealed the decision to the Swedish Ice Hockey Association, but the appeal was effectively turned down on 6 July 2012.

== Notable players ==
- Nikolai Drozdetsky (1989–1995)
- Sergei Fokin (2002–2005)
- Stefan Persson (1986–1990)
- Fabian Brunnström (2006–2007)
- Mattias Remstam (2008–)
