= 1990–91 Division 1 season (Swedish ice hockey) =

- League: Division 1
- Sport: Ice hockey
- Number of teams: 40
- Promoted to Division 1: none to Elitserien
- Relegated to Division 2: CRIF; Bofors IK; Vallentuna BK; Nybro IF

Division 1 seasons
- ← 1989–90 1991–92 →

1990–91 was the 16th season that Division 1 operated as the second tier of ice hockey in Sweden, below the top-flight Elitserien (now the SHL).

== Format ==
Division 1 was divided into four starting groups of 10 teams each. The top two teams in each group qualified for the Allsvenskan, while the remaining eight teams had to compete in a qualifying round. The teams were given zero to seven bonus points based on their finish in the first round. The top two teams from each qualifying round qualified for the playoffs. The last-place team in each of the qualifying groups was relegated directly to Division 2, while the second-to-last-place team had to play in a relegation series.

Of the 10 teams in the Allsvenskan - in addition to the eight participants from Division 1, the two last place teams from the Elitserien also participated - the top two teams qualified directly for the Allsvenskan final, from which the winner was promoted directly to the Elitserien (now the SHL). The second place team qualified for the Kvalserien, which offered another opportunity to be promoted. The third and fourth place teams in the Allsvenskan qualified for the third round of the playoffs, while teams that finished fifth through eighth played in the second round. The three playoff winners qualified for the Kvalserien, in which the first-place team qualified for the following Elitserien season.

== Regular season ==
=== Northern Group ===
==== First round ====
	Club	GP	W	T	L	GF	GA	Pts
1.	IF Björklöven	18	16	1	1	94	33	33
2.	Skellefteå AIK	18	14	3	1	82	38	31
3.	IF Sundsvall/Timrå IK	18	13	0	5	104	68	26
4.	Bodens IK	18	8	2	8	86	77	18
5.	Kiruna IF	18	8	1	9	71	76	17
6.	IF Tunadal	18	6	4	8	78	78	16
7.	Husums IF	18	6	1	11	60	76	13
8.	Lejonströms SK	18	6	0	12	66	104	12
9.	Piteå HC	18	4	2	12	65	85	10
10.	Sollefteå HK	18	2	0	16	46	117	4

==== Qualification round ====
	Club	GP	W	T	L	GF	GA	Pts (Bonus)
1.	Bodens IK	14	10	2	2	69	44	28(6)
2.	IF Sundsvall/Timrå IK	14	8	3	3	66	46	26(7)
3.	Kiruna IF	14	7	3	4	74	61	22(5)
4.	IF Tunadal	14	6	1	7	57	69	17(4)
5.	Piteå HC	14	5	5	4	57	56	16(1)
6.	Husums IF	14	5	2	7	51	46	15(3)
7.	Lejonströms SK	14	5	2	7	58	57	14(2)
8.	Sollefteå HK	14	1	0	13	35	88	2(0)

=== Western Group ===
==== First round ====
	Club	GP	W	T	L	GF	GA	Pts
1.	IK Vita Hästen	18	17	0	1	109	37	34
2.	Mora IK	18	13	2	3	103	43	28
3.	Örebro IK	18	11	1	6	83	45	23
4.	Grums IK	18	8	2	8	75	80	18
5.	IK Westmannia Köping	18	7	3	8	71	74	17
6.	Strömsbro/Gävle	18	6	4	8	71	60	16
7.	IK Tälje	18	7	2	9	63	75	16
8.	Arvika HC	18	6	4	8	63	85	16
9.	Falu IF	18	3	1	14	47	119	7
10.	Avesta BK	18	1	3	14	41	108	5

==== Qualification round ====
	Club	GP	W	T	L	GF	GA	Pts (Bonus)
1.	Örebro IK	14	12	0	2	78	32	31(7)
2.	Arvika HC	14	9	1	4	60	48	21(2)
3.	IK Westmannia Köping	14	7	1	6	63	41	20(5)
4.	Grums IK	14	6	1	7	66	59	19(6)
5.	IK Tälje	14	7	1	6	72	61	18(3)
6.	Strömsbro/Gävle	14	6	1	7	60	65	17(4)
7.	Avesta BK	14	3	2	9	42	82	8(0)
8.	Falu IF	14	2	1	11	50	103	6(1)

=== Eastern Group ===
==== First round ====
	Club	GP	W	T	L	GF	GA	Pts
1.	Huddinge IK	18	16	2	0	100	33	34
2.	R/A 73 HC	18	13	1	4	77	50	27
3.	Väsby IK	18	11	3	4	101	49	25
4.	Hammarby IF	18	8	4	6	67	48	20
5.	Uppsala AIS	18	8	1	9	75	83	17
6.	Danderyds SK	18	5	5	8	60	64	15
7.	IFK Lidingö	18	5	3	10	64	85	13
8.	IFK Tumba	18	5	2	11	54	107	12
9.	Nacka HK	18	4	2	12	47	69	10
10.	Östersunds IK	18	3	1	14	44	101	7

==== Qualification round ====
	Club	GP	W	T	L	GF	GA	Pts (Bonus)
1.	Väsby IK	14	12	1	1	62	28	32(7)
2.	Uppsala AIS	14	8	4	2	64	39	25(5)
3.	Hammarby IF	14	7	3	4	63	37	23(6)
4.	Danderyds SK	14	7	3	4	57	37	21(4)
5.	Nacka HK	14	4	1	9	37	50	10(1)
6.	IFK Tumba	14	3	2	9	34	66	10(2)
7.	IFK Lidingö	14	3	1	10	43	78	10(3)
8.	Östersunds IK	14	4	1	9	31	56	9(0)

=== Southern Group ===
==== First round ====
	Club	GP	W	T	L	GF	GA	Pts
1.	Boro HC	18	12	5	1	106	65	29
2.	Mölndals IF	18	11	5	2	97	59	27
3.	Rögle BK	18	11	2	5	100	48	24
4.	Tyringe SoSS	18	11	2	5	89	65	24
5.	IF Troja-Ljungby	18	9	3	6	84	69	21
6.	Mörrums GoIS	18	6	4	8	71	69	16
7.	Hanhals HF	18	6	2	10	72	84	14
8.	Karlskrona IK	18	4	4	10	74	112	12
9.	Linköpings HC	18	4	0	14	53	121	8
10.	Osby IK	18	2	1	15	66	120	5

==== Qualification round ====
	Club	GP	W	T	L	GF	GA	Pts (Bonus)
1.	Rögle BK	14	12	1	1	89	37	32(7)
2.	IF Troja-Ljungby	14	11	1	2	66	37	28(5)
3.	Tyringe SoSS	14	8	2	4	63	45	24(6)
4.	Mörrums GoIS	14	7	1	6	58	54	19(4)
5.	Linköpings HC	14	5	1	8	48	82	12(1)
6.	Hanhals HF	14	3	2	9	50	63	11(3)
7.	Karlskrona IK	14	3	1	10	50	70	9(2)
8.	Osby IK	14	2	1	11	36	72	5(0)

== Allsvenskan ==
	Club	GP	W	T	L	GF	GA	Pts
1.	Västra Frölunda HC	18	13	2	3	82	51	28
2.	Leksands IF	18	10	6	2	67	44	26
3.	Huddinge IK	18	10	3	5	78	64	23
4.	IF Björklöven	18	9	3	6	66	50	21
5.	Mora IK	18	8	3	7	80	50	19
6.	IK Vita Hästen	18	7	4	7	59	64	18
7.	Mölndals IF	18	7	3	8	60	67	17
8.	Boro HC	18	4	4	10	49	66	12
9.	Skellefteå HC	18	2	7	9	44	57	11
10.	R/A 73 HC	18	2	1	15	52	114	5

=== Final ===
- Västra Frölunda HC - Leksands IF 1:3 (3:6, 1:2, 8:2, 1:5)

== Playoffs ==
=== First round ===
- Bodens IK - Uppsala AIS 2:0 (6:5 OT, 6:5)
- Väsby IK - Sundsvall IF/Timrå IK 2:0 (3:2, 2:0)
- Rögle BK - Arvika HC 2:0 (6:2, 7:2)
- IF Troja-Ljungby - Örebro IK 2:0 (4:3 OT, 4:3 OT)

=== Second round ===
- Mora IK - Rögle BK 0:2 (3:5, 1:7)
- IK Vita Hästen - Bodens IK 2:1 (7:0, 4:5 OT, 2:1)
- Mölndals IF - Väsby IK 2:0 (7:4, 4:1)
- Boro HC - IF Troja-Ljungby 2:1 (2:3 OT, 4:3 OT, 5:2)

=== Third round ===
- Huddinge IK - Boro HC 0:2 (2:3 OT, 2:5)
- IF Björklöven - Mölndals IF 0:2 (2:5, 2:3)
- Rögle BK - IK Vita Hästen 2:1 (2:1 OT, 3:4 OT, 5:1)
