= 1989–90 Division 1 season (Swedish ice hockey) =

- League: Division 1
- Sport: Ice hockey
- Number of teams: 40
- Promoted to Division 1: Malmö IF to Elitserien
- Relegated to Division 2: CRIF; Bofors IK; Vallentuna BK; Nybro IF

Division 1 seasons
- ← 1988–89 1990–91 →

1989–90 was the 15th season that Division 1 operated as the second tier of ice hockey in Sweden, below the top-flight Elitserien (now the SHL).

== Format ==
Division 1 was divided into four starting groups of 10 teams each. The top two teams in each group qualified for the Allsvenskan, while the remaining eight teams had to compete in a qualifying round. The teams were given zero to seven bonus points based on their finish in the first round. The top two teams from each qualifying round qualified for the playoffs. The last-place team in each of the qualifying groups was relegated directly to Division 2, while the second-to-last-place team had to play in a relegation series.

Of the 10 teams in the Allsvenskan - in addition to the eight participants from Division 1, the two last place teams from the Elitserien also participated - the top two teams qualified directly for the Allsvenskan final, from which the winner was promoted directly to the Elitserien. The second place team qualified for the Kvalserien, which offered another opportunity to be promoted. The third and fourth place teams in the Allsvenskan qualified for the third round of the playoffs, while teams that finished fifth through eighth played in the second round. The three playoff winners qualified for the Kvalserien, in which the first-place team qualified for the following Elitserien season.

== Regular season ==
=== Northern Group ===
==== First round ====
| | Club | GP | W | T | L | GF | GA | Pts |
|---|---|---|---|---|---|---|---|---|
| 1. | IF Björklöven | 18 | 15 | 0 | 3 | 114 | 52 | 30 |
| 2. | Bodens IK | 18 | 14 | 0 | 4 | 86 | 60 | 28 |
| 3. | Timrå IK | 18 | 12 | 1 | 5 | 86 | 55 | 25 |
| 4. | IF Sundsvall | 18 | 10 | 0 | 8 | 96 | 77 | 20 |
| 5. | Husums IF | 18 | 7 | 4 | 7 | 78 | 90 | 18 |
| 6. | Piteå HC | 18 | 8 | 1 | 9 | 79 | 72 | 17 |
| 7. | Kiruna IF | 18 | 7 | 2 | 9 | 80 | 86 | 16 |
| 8. | Lejonströms SK | 18 | 5 | 2 | 11 | 78 | 82 | 12 |
| 9. | Sollefteå HK | 18 | 3 | 1 | 14 | 63 | 109 | 7 |
| 10. | CRIF | 18 | 3 | 1 | 14 | 47 | 124 | 7 |

==== Qualification round ====
| | Club | GP | W | T | L | GF | GA | Pts (Bonus) |
|---|---|---|---|---|---|---|---|---|
| 1. | IF Sundsvall | 14 | 11 | 0 | 3 | 93 | 48 | 28(6) |
| 2. | Timrå IK | 14 | 9 | 1 | 4 | 60 | 49 | 26(7) |
| 3. | Husums IF | 14 | 7 | 1 | 6 | 62 | 51 | 20(5) |
| 4. | Lejonströms SK | 14 | 7 | 1 | 6 | 77 | 61 | 17(2) |
| 5. | Kiruna IF | 14 | 6 | 2 | 6 | 65 | 56 | 17(3) |
| 6. | Piteå HC | 14 | 5 | 0 | 9 | 58 | 59 | 14(4) |
| 7. | Sollefteå HK | 14 | 6 | 0 | 8 | 55 | 76 | 13(1) |
| 8. | CRIF | 14 | 2 | 1 | 11 | 37 | 107 | 5(0) |

=== Western Group ===
==== First round ====
| | Club | GP | W | T | L | GF | GA | Pts |
|---|---|---|---|---|---|---|---|---|
| 1. | IK Vita Hästen | 18 | 16 | 0 | 2 | 118 | 38 | 32 |
| 2. | Mora IK | 18 | 12 | 2 | 4 | 77 | 52 | 26 |
| 3. | Örebro IK | 18 | 12 | 1 | 5 | 116 | 67 | 25 |
| 4. | Falu IF | 18 | 8 | 3 | 7 | 81 | 83 | 19 |
| 5. | Strömsbro/Gävle | 18 | 9 | 0 | 9 | 95 | 91 | 18 |
| 6. | Arvika HC | 18 | 8 | 1 | 9 | 67 | 77 | 17 |
| 7. | Bofors IK | 18 | 7 | 0 | 11 | 76 | 95 | 14 |
| 8. | Linköpings HC | 18 | 6 | 0 | 12 | 92 | 94 | 12 |
| 9. | Grums IK | 18 | 5 | 1 | 12 | 62 | 97 | 11 |
| 10. | Avesta BK | 18 | 2 | 2 | 14 | 45 | 135 | 6 |

==== Qualification round ====
| | Club | GP | W | T | L | GF | GA | Pts (Bonus) |
|---|---|---|---|---|---|---|---|---|
| 1. | Örebro IK | 14 | 12 | 1 | 1 | 85 | 37 | 32(7) |
| 2. | Strömsbro/Gävle | 14 | 9 | 0 | 5 | 59 | 53 | 23(5) |
| 3. | Linköpings HC | 14 | 7 | 3 | 4 | 67 | 58 | 19(2) |
| 4. | Arvika HC | 14 | 7 | 1 | 6 | 57 | 54 | 19(4) |
| 5. | Falu IF | 14 | 4 | 1 | 9 | 60 | 66 | 15(6) |
| 6. | Grums IK | 14 | 5 | 1 | 8 | 57 | 67 | 12(1) |
| 7. | Avesta BK | 14 | 5 | 2 | 7 | 57 | 73 | 12(0) |
| 8. | Bofors IK | 14 | 2 | 1 | 11 | 43 | 77 | 8(3) |

=== Eastern Group ===
==== First round ====
| | Club | GP | W | T | L | GF | GA | Pts |
|---|---|---|---|---|---|---|---|---|
| 1. | Huddinge IK | 18 | 14 | 1 | 3 | 90 | 52 | 29 |
| 2. | IK Tälje | 18 | 14 | 0 | 4 | 83 | 61 | 28 |
| 3. | Hammarby IF | 18 | 13 | 1 | 4 | 90 | 53 | 27 |
| 4. | Väsby IK | 18 | 12 | 0 | 6 | 102 | 56 | 24 |
| 5. | Nacka HK | 18 | 8 | 2 | 8 | 73 | 63 | 18 |
| 6. | IFK Lidingö | 18 | 8 | 0 | 10 | 73 | 90 | 16 |
| 7. | Uppsala AIS | 18 | 7 | 1 | 10 | 63 | 65 | 15 |
| 8. | Östersunds IK | 18 | 5 | 0 | 13 | 55 | 100 | 10 |
| 9. | Vallentuna BK | 18 | 4 | 1 | 13 | 58 | 95 | 9 |
| 10. | Danderyds SK | 18 | 2 | 0 | 16 | 53 | 105 | 4 |

==== Qualification round ====
| | Club | GP | W | T | L | GF | GA | Pts (Bonus) |
|---|---|---|---|---|---|---|---|---|
| 1. | Hammarby IF | 14 | 10 | 1 | 3 | 65 | 39 | 28(7) |
| 2. | Väsby IK | 14 | 8 | 2 | 4 | 74 | 40 | 24(6) |
| 3. | Nacka HK | 14 | 7 | 2 | 5 | 50 | 44 | 21(5) |
| 4. | IFK Lidingö | 14 | 6 | 2 | 6 | 62 | 65 | 18(4) |
| 5. | Östersunds IK | 14 | 5 | 2 | 7 | 35 | 50 | 14(2) |
| 6. | Uppsala AIS | 14 | 5 | 0 | 9 | 44 | 59 | 13(3) |
| 7. | Danderyds SK | 14 | 5 | 1 | 8 | 54 | 69 | 11(0) |
| 8. | Vallentuna BK | 14 | 4 | 2 | 8 | 47 | 65 | 11(1) |

=== Southern Group ===
==== First round ====
| | Club | GP | W | T | L | GF | GA | Pts |
|---|---|---|---|---|---|---|---|---|
| 1. | Malmö IF | 18 | 17 | 0 | 1 | 151 | 33 | 34 |
| 2. | Rögle BK | 18 | 14 | 2 | 2 | 105 | 48 | 30 |
| 3. | Tyringe SoSS | 18 | 13 | 0 | 5 | 96 | 73 | 26 |
| 4. | Boro HC | 18 | 9 | 1 | 8 | 79 | 76 | 19 |
| 5. | IF Troja-Ljungby | 18 | 8 | 3 | 7 | 83 | 83 | 19 |
| 6. | Mölndals IF | 18 | 8 | 1 | 9 | 70 | 81 | 17 |
| 7. | Osby IK | 18 | 6 | 0 | 12 | 69 | 123 | 12 |
| 8. | Mörrums GoIS | 18 | 5 | 1 | 12 | 77 | 103 | 11 |
| 9. | Nybro IF | 18 | 4 | 1 | 13 | 54 | 87 | 9 |
| 10. | Mariestad BoIS | 18 | 1 | 1 | 16 | 50 | 125 | 3 |

==== Qualification round ====
| | Club | GP | W | T | L | GF | GA | Pts (Bonus) |
|---|---|---|---|---|---|---|---|---|
| 1. | Tyringe SoSS | 14 | 12 | 0 | 2 | 95 | 56 | 31(7) |
| 2. | Boro HC | 14 | 9 | 2 | 3 | 84 | 62 | 26(6) |
| 3. | Mölndals IF | 14 | 7 | 3 | 4 | 74 | 50 | 21(4) |
| 4. | IF Troja-Ljungby | 14 | 7 | 1 | 6 | 65 | 69 | 20(5) |
| 5. | Mörrums GoIS | 14 | 6 | 4 | 4 | 70 | 57 | 18(2) |
| 6. | Osby IK | 14 | 3 | 2 | 9 | 52 | 71 | 11(3) |
| 7. | Mariestads BoIS | 14 | 5 | 0 | 9 | 64 | 93 | 10(0) |
| 8. | Nybro IF | 14 | 0 | 2 | 12 | 43 | 89 | 3(1) |

== Allsvenskan ==
| | Club | GP | W | T | L | GF | GA | Pts |
|---|---|---|---|---|---|---|---|---|
| 1. | Malmö IF | 18 | 15 | 3 | 0 | 83 | 37 | 33 |
| 2. | MoDo AIK | 18 | 12 | 2 | 4 | 92 | 53 | 26 |
| 3. | Skellefteå HC | 18 | 10 | 1 | 7 | 76 | 59 | 21 |
| 4. | IF Björklöven | 18 | 9 | 2 | 7 | 78 | 72 | 20 |
| 5. | IK Vita Hästen | 18 | 9 | 2 | 7 | 63 | 62 | 20 |
| 6. | Rögle BK | 18 | 9 | 1 | 8 | 81 | 65 | 19 |
| 7. | Bodens IK | 18 | 7 | 1 | 10 | 78 | 80 | 15 |
| 8. | Huddinge IK | 18 | 7 | 1 | 10 | 63 | 69 | 15 |
| 9. | Mora IK | 18 | 3 | 1 | 14 | 47 | 93 | 7 |
| 10. | IK Tälje | 18 | 1 | 2 | 15 | 35 | 106 | 4 |

=== Final ===
- Malmö IF - MoDo AIK 3:0 (7:0, 5:2, 4:3 OT)

== Playoffs ==
=== First round ===
- IF Sundsvall - Strömsbro/Gävle 2:0 (5:4, 8:2)
- Örebro IK - Timrå IK 2:1 (2:4, 7:2, 3:1)
- Tyringe SoSS - Väsby IK 2:0 (5:2, 8:3)
- Hammarby IF - Boro HC 2:1 (7:3, 2:3, 12:0)

=== Second round ===
- IK Vita Hästen - Tyringe SoSS 2:0 (5:4 OT, 6:1)
- Rögle BK - Hammarby IF 2:0 (7:6, 6:1)
- Bodens IK - IF Sundsvall 1:2 (2:6, 7:5, 3:5)
- Huddinge IK - Örebro IK 2:1 (0:6, 4:3, 5:2)

=== Third round ===
- Skellefteå HC - IK Vita Hästen 1:2 (1:2 OT, 2:1, 2:3)
- IF Björklöven - IF Sundsvall 2:0 (5:4, 5:1)
- Rögle BK - Huddinge IK 2:0 (5:3, 9:1)
