= 1987–88 Division 1 season (Swedish ice hockey) =

- League: Division 1
- Sport: Ice hockey
- Number of teams: 40
- Promoted to Division 1: MoDo AIK; HV71 to Elitserien
- Relegated to Division 2: Tegs SK; IK Viking; Östersunds IK; Karlskrona IK

Division 1 seasons
- ← 1986–87 1988–89 →

1987–88 was the 13th season that Division 1 operated as the second tier of ice hockey in Sweden, below the top-flight Elitserien (now the Swedish Hockey League).

== Format ==
Division 1 was divided into four starting groups of 10 teams each. The top two teams in each group qualified for the Allsvenskan, while the remaining eight teams had to compete in a qualifying round. The teams were given zero to seven bonus points based on their finish in the first round. The top two teams from each qualifying round qualified for the playoffs. The last-place team in each of the qualifying groups was relegated directly to Division 2, while the second-to-last-place team had to play in a relegation series.

Of the 10 teams in the Allsvenskan - in addition to the eight participants from Division 1, the two last place teams from the Elitserien also participated - the top two teams qualified directly for the Allsvenskan final, from which the winner was promoted directly to the Elitserien (now the SHL). The second place team qualified for the Kvalserien, which offered another opportunity to be promoted. The third and fourth place teams in the Allsvenskan qualified for the third round of the playoffs, while teams that finished fifth through eighth played in the second round. The three playoff winners qualified for the Kvalserien, in which the first-place team qualified for the following Elitserien season.

== Regular season ==
=== Northern Group ===
==== First round ====
	Club	GP	W	T	L	GF	GA	Pts
1.	Sollefteå HK	18	12	1	5	89	93	25
2.	IF Sundsvall	18	12	0	6	93	52	24
3.	Timrå IK	18	11	1	6	90	67	23
4.	Piteå HC	18	10	1	7	82	67	21
5.	Kiruna HC	18	9	1	8	63	56	19
6.	Bodens IK	18	9	1	8	80	81	19
7.	Kiruna AIF	18	8	0	10	71	74	16
8.	CRIF	18	8	0	10	63	72	16
9.	Bergnäsets IF	18	5	1	12	66	100	11
10.	Tegs SK	18	3	0	15	63	98	6

==== Qualification round ====
	Club	GP	W	T	L	GF	GA	Pts (Bonus)
1.	Timrå IK	14	9	0	5	73	57	25(7)
2.	Piteå HC	14	8	0	6	62	58	22(6)
3.	Bergnäsets IF	14	9	0	5	69	57	19(1)
4.	CRIF	14	7	2	5	61	48	18(2)
5.	Kiruna AIF	14	6	2	6	55	63	17(3)
6.	Bodens IK	14	5	2	7	80	82	16(4)
7.	Kiruna HC	14	4	1	9	46	50	14(5)
8.	Tegs SK	14	4	1	9	57	88	9(0)

=== Western Group ===
==== First round ====
	Club	GP	W	T	L	GF	GA	Pts
1.	Örebro IK	18	17	0	1	120	38	34
2.	IK Vita Hästen	18	15	0	3	115	55	30
3.	Västerås IK	18	13	0	5	131	64	26
4.	Falu IF	18	11	0	7	85	71	22
5.	Grums IK	18	9	1	8	67	98	19
6.	Mora IK	18	8	1	9	80	83	17
7.	Mariestads BoIS	18	5	1	12	68	93	11
8.	Bofors IK	18	5	1	12	65	109	11
9.	IK Tälje	18	3	2	13	68	113	8
10.	IK Viking	18	1	0	17	47	122	2

==== Qualification round ====
	Club	GP	W	T	L	GF	GA	Pts (Bonus)
1.	Västerås IK	14	12	0	2	101	31	31(7)
2.	Mora IK	14	9	3	2	70	44	25(4)
3.	Falu IF	14	8	1	5	85	54	23(6)
4.	Mariestads BoIS	14	4	4	6	57	51	15(3)
5.	Bofors IK	14	5	1	8	61	85	13(2)
6.	IK Tälje	14	5	1	8	51	76	12(1)
7.	Grums IK	14	2	3	9	45	92	12(5)
8.	IK Viking	14	4	1	9	54	91	9(0)

=== Eastern Group ===
==== First round ====
	Club	GP	W	T	L	GF	GA	Pts
1.	Huddinge IK	18	16	0	2	109	26	32
2.	Nacka HK	18	14	0	4	92	61	28
3.	Hammarby IF	18	10	2	6	92	67	22
4.	Uppsala AIS	18	9	2	7	63	72	20
5.	Vallentuna BK	18	9	0	9	67	70	18
6.	Strömsbro/Gävle	18	7	3	8	72	75	17
7.	IFK Lidingö	18	7	2	9	67	73	16
8.	Skutskärs SK	18	5	2	11	54	83	12
9.	Östersunds IK	18	4	1	13	74	102	9
10.	R/A 73 HC	18	3	0	15	70	131	6

==== Qualification round ====
	Club	GP	W	T	L	GF	GA	Pts (Bonus)
1.	Vallentuna BK	14	9	1	4	51	31	24(5)
2.	Hammarby IF	14	8	1	5	71	53	24(7)
3.	Uppsala AIS	14	8	1	5	58	51	23(6)
4.	IFK Lidingö	14	7	0	7	59	58	17(3)
5.	Strömsbro/Gävle	14	6	0	8	57	60	16(4)
6.	Skutskärs SK	14	5	1	8	42	54	13(2)
7.	R/A 73 HC	14	6	0	8	51	58	12(0)
8.	Östersunds IK	14	5	0	9	34	58	11(1)

=== Southern Group ===
==== First round ====
	Club	GP	W	T	L	GF	GA	Pts
1.	Västra Frölunda HC	18	15	1	2	130	48	31
2.	Rögle BK	18	12	1	5	91	60	25
3.	Malmö IF	18	11	1	6	101	68	23
4.	IF Troja-Ljungby	18	10	2	6	81	55	22
5.	Mölndals IF	18	10	1	7	73	66	21
6.	Tyringe SoSS	18	9	2	7	92	60	20
7.	Karlskrona IK	18	5	2	11	69	110	12
8.	Mörrums GoIS	18	5	1	12	72	130	11
9.	Tingsryds AIF	18	5	0	13	64	108	10
10.	Nybro IF	18	2	1	15	39	107	5

==== Qualification round ====
	Club	GP	W	T	L	GF	GA	Pts (Bonus)
1.	Tyringe SoSS	14	10	0	4	89	48	24(4)
2.	Malmö IF	14	8	1	5	77	57	24(7)
3.	IF Troja-Ljungby	14	9	0	5	73	55	24(6)
4.	Mölndals IF	14	7	1	6	65	59	20(5)
5.	Nybro IF	14	5	4	5	46	48	14(0)
6.	Tingsryds AIF	14	5	2	7	53	60	13(1)
7.	Mörrums GoIS	14	5	0	9	55	69	12(2)
8.	Karlskrona IK	14	2	2	10	47	109	9(3)

== Allsvenskan ==
	Club	GP	W	T	L	GF	GA	Pts
1.	Västra Frölunda HC	18	14	0	4	106	69	28
2.	Skellefteå HC	18	13	0	5	85	49	26
3.	Rögle BK	18	12	2	4	87	57	26
4.	Örebro IK	18	12	1	5	75	51	25
5.	Väsby IK	18	8	3	7	67	68	19
6.	IF Sundsvall	18	7	3	8	70	79	17
7.	Huddinge IK	18	7	1	10	77	77	15
8.	Nacka HK	18	4	2	12	54	73	10
9.	IK Vita Hästen	18	3	3	12	61	88	9
10.	Sollefteå HK	18	2	1	15	51	122	5

=== Final ===
- Västra Frölunda HC - Skellefteå HC 2:3 (2:4, 1:5, 6:5, 6:5 OT, 1:10)

== Playoffs ==
=== First round ===
- Timrå IK - Mora IK 2:0 (5:4 OT, 3:2)
- Västerås IK - Piteå HC 2:1 (5:3, 3:4 OT, 11:2)
- Vallentuna BK - Malmö IF 2:1 (3:9, 7:3, 4:3)
- Tyringe SoSS - Hammarby IF 2:1 (7:4, 4:5, 11:5)

=== Second round ===
- Väsby IK - Timrå IK 2:1 (2:0, 2:5, 7:2)
- IF Sundsvall - Tyringe SoSS 2:1 (5:4, 3:4, 7:5)
- Huddinge IK - Vallentuna BK 2:0 (5:4, 10:3)
- Nacka HK - Västerås IK 1:2 (6:5 OT, 1:2, 2:4)

=== Third round ===
- Rögle BK - Väsby IK 0:2 (4:5, 4:5 OT)
- Örebro IK - Huddinge IK 2:1 (4:1, 4:5, 4:1)
- IF Sundsvall - Västerås IK 0:2 (1:5, 3:8)
