= 1988–89 Division 1 season (Swedish ice hockey) =

- League: Division 1
- Sport: Ice hockey
- Number of teams: 40
- Promoted to Division 1: Västra Frölunda HC to Elitserien
- Relegated to Division 2: Bergnäsets IF; Surahammars IF; Skutskärs SK; Tingsryds AIF

Division 1 seasons
- ← 1987–88 1989–90 →

1988–89 was the 14th season that Division 1 operated as the second tier of ice hockey in Sweden, below the top-flight Elitserien (now the Swedish Hockey League).

== Format ==
Division 1 was divided into four starting groups of 10 teams each. The top two teams in each group qualified for the Allsvenskan, while the remaining eight teams had to compete in a qualifying round. The teams were given zero to seven bonus points based on their finish in the first round. The top two teams from each qualifying round qualified for the playoffs. The last-place team in each of the qualifying groups was relegated directly to Division 2, while the second-to-last-place team had to play in a relegation series.

Of the 10 teams in the Allsvenskan - in addition to the eight participants from Division 1, the two last place teams from the Elitserien also participated - the top two teams qualified directly for the Allsvenskan final, from which the winner was promoted directly to the Elitserien. The second place team qualified for the Kvalserien, which offered another opportunity to be promoted. The third and fourth place teams in the Allsvenskan qualified for the third round of the playoffs, while teams that finished fifth through eighth played in the second round. The three playoff winners qualified for the Kvalserien, in which the first-place team qualified for the following Elitserien season.

== Regular season ==
=== Northern Group ===
==== First round ====
	Club	GP	W	T	L	GF	GA	Pts
1.	IF Sundsvall	18	14	2	2	116	53	30
2.	Kiruna IF	18	12	2	4	84	56	26
3.	Timrå IK	18	11	3	4	85	51	25
4.	Piteå HC	18	9	2	7	78	72	20
5.	Bodens IK	18	9	1	8	84	61	19
6.	Husums IF	18	9	0	9	90	88	18
7.	CRIF	18	7	2	9	65	87	16
8.	Sollefteå HK	18	4	1	13	59	104	9
9.	Bergnäsets IF	18	4	1	13	46	96	9
10.	Lejonströms SK	18	4	0	14	61	100	8

==== Qualification round ====
	Club	GP	W	T	L	GF	GA	Pts (Bonus)
1.	Bodens IK	14	10	2	2	78	42	27(5)
2.	Timrå IK	14	9	0	5	74	42	25(7)
3.	Piteå HC	14	9	0	5	67	58	24(6)
4.	Husums IF	14	8	1	5	64	57	21(4)
5.	Sollefteå HK	14	5	0	9	59	73	12(2)
6.	Lejonströms SK	14	6	0	8	55	70	12(0)
7.	CRIF	14	4	1	9	54	75	12(3)
8.	Bergnäsets IF	14	3	0	11	46	80	7(1)

=== Western Group ===
==== First round ====
	Club	GP	W	T	L	GF	GA	Pts
1.	Örebro IK	18	16	0	2	127	48	32
2.	IK Vita Hästen	18	14	2	2	97	54	30
3.	Falu IF	18	10	2	6	81	64	22
4.	Mora IK	18	10	0	8	57	55	20
5.	Linköpings HC	18	9	1	8	87	84	19
6.	Mariestads BoIS	18	6	2	10	68	80	14
7.	Grums IK	18	6	0	12	73	99	12
8.	Surahammars IF	18	5	2	11	59	87	12
9.	Bofors IK	18	5	1	12	77	104	11
10.	Arvika HC	18	4	0	14	62	113	8

==== Qualification round ====
	Club	GP	W	T	L	GF	GA	Pts (Bonus)
1.	Mora IK	14	9	1	4	63	42	25(6)
2.	Grums IK	14	9	2	3	78	60	23(3)
3.	Mariestads BoIS	14	7	1	6	58	65	19(4)
4.	Falu IF	14	5	1	8	53	63	18(7)
5.	Linköpings HC	14	5	1	8	70	70	16(5)
6.	Bofors IK	14	7	0	7	62	68	15(1)
7.	Arvika HC	14	7	1	6	59	65	15(0)
8.	Surahammars IF	14	3	1	10	54	64	9(2)

=== Eastern Group ===
==== First round ====
	Club	GP	W	T	L	GF	GA	Pts
1.	Hammarby IF	18	13	1	4	98	69	27
2.	Uppsala AIS	18	12	2	4	87	62	26
3.	Väsby IK	18	10	4	4	84	49	24
4.	Huddinge IK	18	10	1	7	83	66	21
5.	IK Tälje	18	10	1	7	69	62	21
6.	Nacka HK	18	8	1	9	70	66	17
7.	IFK Lidingö	18	6	2	10	70	81	14
8.	Strömsbro/Gävle	18	6	2	10	57	85	14
9.	Vallentuna BK	18	5	1	12	55	82	11
10.	Skutskärs SK	18	2	1	15	42	93	5

==== Qualification round ====
	Club	GP	W	T	L	GF	GA	Pts (Bonus)
1.	Huddinge IK	14	13	0	1	83	34	32(6)
2.	Väsby IK	14	9	0	5	66	42	25(7)
3.	Nacka HK	14	7	1	6	60	53	19(4)
4.	Strömsbro/Gävle	14	7	0	7	52	59	16(2)
5.	IK Tälje	14	5	1	8	58	74	16(5)
6.	Vallentuna BK	14	7	0	7	59	64	15(1)
7.	IFK Lidingö	14	5	0	9	60	76	13(3)
8.	Skutskärs SK	14	2	0	12	39	75	4(0)

=== Southern Group ===
==== First round ====
	Club	GP	W	T	L	GF	GA	Pts
1.	Västra Frölunda HC	18	15	1	2	127	48	31
2.	Rögle BK	18	15	0	3	136	67	30
3.	Malmö IF	18	14	1	3	115	48	29
4.	Mölndals IF	18	9	3	6	79	84	21
5.	Tyringe SoSS	18	8	1	9	101	101	17
6.	Mörrums GoIS	18	7	1	10	90	96	15
7.	IF Troja-Ljungby	18	7	1	10	76	87	15
8.	Osby IK	18	7	0	11	84	100	14
9.	Nybro IF	18	3	1	14	50	120	7
10.	Tingsryds AIF	18	0	1	17	45	152	1

==== Qualification round ====
	Club	GP	W	T	L	GF	GA	Pts (Bonus)
1.	Malmö IF	14	12	0	2	100	39	31(7)
2.	Mölndals IF	14	11	1	2	84	43	29(6)
3.	IF Troja-Ljungby	14	12	0	2	96	62	27(3)
4.	Tyringe SoSS	14	6	2	6	84	73	19(5)
5.	Mörrums GoIS	14	2	3	9	47	75	11(4)
6.	Osby IK	14	4	0	10	42	90	10(2)
7.	Nybro IF	14	3	2	9	50	72	9(1)
8.	Tingsryds AIF	14	2	0	12	40	89	4(0)

== Allsvenskan ==
	Club	GP	W	T	L	GF	GA	Pts
1.	Västerås IK	18	14	0	4	83	58	28
2.	Västra Frölunda HC	18	13	1	4	97	56	27
3.	Rögle BK	18	10	2	6	87	61	22
4.	IF Björklöven	18	11	0	7	73	62	22
5.	IK Vita Hästen	18	10	1	7	65	55	21
6.	Örebro IK	18	7	2	9	64	60	16
7.	Hammarby IF	18	8	0	10	79	88	16
8.	IF Sundsvall	18	6	1	11	77	88	13
9.	Kiruna IF	18	3	3	12	49	103	9
10.	Uppsala AIS	18	2	2	14	48	91	6

=== Final ===
- Västerås IK - Västra Frölunda HC 3:2 (5:3, 3:6, 8:3, 3:10, 4:2)

== Playoffs ==
=== First round ===
- Bodens IK - Väsby IK 1:2 (6:4, 3:8, 1:8)
- Huddinge IK - Timrå IK 1:2 (6:0, 4:5 OT, 0:4)
- Mora IK - Mölndals IF 1:2 (7:5, 2:8, 5:6 OT)
- Malmö IF - Grums IK 2:0 (7:2, 6:0)

=== Second round ===
- IK Vita Hästen - Timrå IK 2:1 (4:5, 1:0, 5:4 OT)
- Örebro IK - Mölndals IF 2:1 (7:6 OT, 4:7, 10:3)
- Hammarby IF - Väsby IK 0:2 (2:7, 4:5 OT)
- IF Sundsvall - Malmö IF 0:2 (1:3, 3:10)

=== Third round ===
- Rögle BK - Örebro IK 1:2 (8:2, 3:8, 2:4)
- IF Björklöven - Väsby IK 2:0 (5:1, 6:3)
- IK Vita Hästen - Malmö IF 1:2 (4:3, 2:8, 1:3)
