= 2012–13 Division 1 season (Swedish ice hockey) =

- League: Division 1
- Sport: Ice hockey
- Number of teams: 56
- Top scorer: (Sweden) Fredrik Näslund (Falu IF); 39 goals in 32 GP
- Promoted to Division 1: IF Björklöven to HockeyAllsvenskan
- Relegated to Division 2: Bodens HF; Kramfors-Alliansen; Njurunda SK*; IFK Ore; Järfälla HC*; Kungälvs IK; *Accepted demotion voluntarily

Division 1 seasons
- ← 2011–12 2013–14 →

The 2012–13 Division 1 season in Swedish hockey was played from 12 September 2012 to 17 February 2013, with a number of playoff and promotion/relegation tournaments continuing until 27 March. The season resulted in IF Björklöven (which has previously played in the upper leagues of Swedish hockey) being promoted to the second-tier league HockeyAllsvenskan.

== Format ==
The 56 participating teams played the first half of the season in six groups divided geographically. The successful teams then moved into three new groups (the Allettan groups), while the remaining teams played in a continuation of their smaller existing groups. The teams with the worst records in these continuation groups were then forced to defend their places in Division 1 against challengers from Division 2 (see "relegation tournament" below) in a round-robin tournament called Kvalserien till Division 1. Meanwhile, the successful teams from the Allettan groups along with the group winners of the continuation groups played a playoff to determine who would have a chance to compete for promotion to the second-tier league HockeyAllsvenskan in Kvalserien till HockeyAllsvenskan.

== Participating clubs ==
Division 1A	Division 1B	Division 1C	Division 1D	Division 1E	Division 1F
IF Björklöven; Bodens HF; Kalix UHC; Kiruna IF; Piteå HC; Tegs SK; Vännäs HC	Brunflo IK; Kovlands IshF; Kramfors-Alliansen; Njurunda SK; Sollefteå HK; IF Sundsvall Hockey; Örnsköldsvik HF; Östersunds IK	Borlänge HF; Enköpings SK HK; Falu IF; Hedemora SK; Hudiksvalls HC; Lindlövens IF; IFK Ore; Surahammars IF; Tierps HK; Valbo HC	Botkyrka HC; Huddinge IK; Järfälla HC; Nacka HK; Nyköpings HK; IF Vallentuna BK; Visby/Roma HK; Väsby IK HK; Wings HC Arlanda; Åker/Strängnäs HC	IFK Arboga IK; Grästorps IK; Kumla HC Black Bulls; Skövde IK; Mariestad BoIS HC; Mjölby HC; Tranås AIF IF; Vimmerby HC; Västerviks IK; HC Vita Hästen	Borås HC; Halmstad HF; Helsingborgs HC; Kallinge-Ronneby IF; Kungälvs IK; Kristianstads IK; Mörrums GoIS IK; Nittorps IK; Nybro Vikings; Olofströms IK; IK Pantern

== Initial groups ==
=== Division 1A ===
* Teams 1–4 play the second half of the season in Allettan Norra.
* Teams 5–7 continue in the same group

#	Team	GP	W	T	L	GF	GA	GD	TP	OTW	OTL	GWSW	GWSL
1	IF Björklöven	24	22	1	1	130	32	+98	67	0	0	0	1
2	Kiruna IF	24	16	1	7	98	49	+49	50	1	0	0	0
3	Piteå HC	24	15	1	8	100	50	+50	47	0	0	1	0
4	Tegs SK	24	8	7	9	63	66	–3	34	1	2	2	2
5	Kalix UHC	24	7	1	16	57	95	–38	23	1	0	0	0
6	Vännäs HC	24	6	2	16	63	109	–46	21	0	1	1	0
7	Bodens HF	24	3	1	20	46	156	–110	10	0	0	0	1

==== Division 1A continuation series ====
* Team 1 continues to Playoff 1
* Teams 2 and 3 are forced to play Kvalserie A to requalify for Division 1

#	Team	GP	W	T	L	GF	GA	GD	TP	OTW	OTL	GWSW	GWSL
1	Vännäs HC	8	6	1	1	43	21	+22	21	1	0	0	0
2	Kalix UHC	8	4	1	3	31	26	+5	15	0	1	0	0
3	Bodens HF	8	1	0	7	18	45	–27	3	0	0	0	0

=== Division 1B ===
* Teams 1–4 play the second half of the season in Allettan Norra.
* Teams 5–8 continue in the same group

#	Team	GP	W	T	L	GF	GA	GD	TP	OTW	OTL	GWSW	GWSL
1	IF Sundsvall Hockey	28	23	4	1	185	53	+132	77	2	0	2	0
2	Östersunds IK	28	18	4	6	116	61	+55	60	2	1	0	1
3	Örnsköldsvik HF	28	13	4	11	110	88	+22	46	1	0	2	1
4	Kovlands IshF	28	9	10	9	96	101	–5	39	0	3	2	5
5	Kramfors-Alliansen	28	8	5	15	103	149	–46	34	5	0	0	0
6	Sollefteå HK	28	6	9	13	76	111	–35	30	2	5	1	1
7	Brunflo IK	28	6	6	16	72	119	–47	27	1	2	2	1
8	Njurunda SK	28	7	2	19	69	145	–76	23	0	2	0	0

==== Division 1B continuation series ====
* Team 1 continues to Playoff 1
* Teams 2 through 4 are forced to play Kvalserie B to requalify for Division 1

#	Team	GP	W	T	L	GF	GA	GD	TP	OTW	OTL	GWSW	GWSL
1	Sollefteå HK	12	9	1	2	55	29	+26	30	0	0	0	1
2	Brunflo IK	12	7	2	3	39	31	+8	25	0	1	1	0
3	Kramfors-Alliansen	12	5	2	5	43	43	±0	23	1	0	1	0
4	Njurunda SK	12	0	1	11	25	59	–34	1	0	0	0	1

=== Division 1C ===
* Teams 1–4 play the second half of the season in Allettan Mellan.
* Teams 5–10 continue in the same group

#	Team	GP	W	T	L	GF	GA	GD	TP	OTW	OTL	GWSW	GWSL
1	Falu IF	27	18	3	6	113	71	+42	59	1	1	1	0
2	Hudiksvalls HC	27	17	6	4	94	66	+28	59	0	2	2	2
3	Enköpings SK HK	27	16	1	10	108	82	+26	50	1	0	0	0
4	Lindlövens IF	27	15	3	9	121	81	+40	49	0	1	1	1
5	Surahammars IF	27	13	6	8	96	77	+19	47	0	2	2	2
6	Tierps HK	27	12	5	10	95	81	+14	46	2	0	3	0
7	Borlänge HF	27	11	6	10	117	102	+15	42	3	0	0	3
8	Hedemora SK	27	9	3	15	75	89	–14	31	0	1	1	1
9	Valbo HC	27	6	3	18	73	109	–36	22	0	0	1	2
10	IFK Ore	27	0	0	27	31	165	–134	0	0	0	0	0

==== Division 1C continuation series ====
* Team 1 continues to Playoff 1
* Teams 5 and 6 are forced to play Kvalserie C to requalify for Division 1

#	Team	GP	W	T	L	GF	GA	GD	TP	OTW	OTL	GWSW	GWSL
1	Borlänge HF	15	11	2	2	60	21	+39	40	0	1	1	0
2	Surahammars IF	15	8	4	3	59	55	+4	38	2	1	0	1
3	Tierps HK	15	6	4	5	61	59	+2	31	1	0	2	1
4	Hedemora SK	15	8	1	6	53	50	+3	27	0	0	0	1
5	Valbo HC	15	4	2	9	53	50	+3	17	1	0	1	0
6	IFK Ore	15	0	3	12	34	85	–51	3	0	2	0	1

=== Division 1D ===
* Teams 1–4 play the second half of the season in Allettan Mellan.
* Teams 5–10 continue in the same group

#	Team	GP	W	T	L	GF	GA	GD	TP	OTW	OTL	GWSW	GWSL
1	Visby/Roma HK	27	20	4	3	125	71	+54	66	2	1	0	1
2	Nyköpings HK	27	21	1	5	111	59	+52	65	1	0	0	0
3	Huddinge IK	27	16	1	10	114	80	+34	50	0	0	1	0
4	Åker/Strängnäs HC	27	12	3	12	83	90	–7	40	1	1	0	1
5	Väsby IK HK	27	11	3	13	95	101	–6	38	1	1	1	0
6	Wings HC Arlanda	27	10	3	14	77	86	–9	35	0	1	2	0
7	IF Vallentuna BK	27	10	4	13	91	102	–11	35	1	2	0	1
8	Järfälla HC	27	9	6	12	63	90	–27	35	1	3	1	1
9	Botkyrka HC	27	5	4	18	81	112	–31	21	2	1	0	1
10	Nacka HK	27	5	3	19	75	124	–49	20	2	1	0	0

==== Division 1D continuation series ====
* Team 1 continues to Playoff 1
* Teams 5 and 6 are forced to play Kvalserie D to requalify for Division 1

#	Team	GP	W	T	L	GF	GA	GD	TP	OTW	OTL	GWSW	GWSL
1	Wings HC Arlanda	15	11	1	3	78	45	+33	40	0	0	0	1
2	Väsby IK HK	15	9	2	4	55	43	+12	38	1	1	0	0
3	Botkyrka HC	15	7	1	7	55	50	+5	24	0	0	1	0
4	IF Vallentuna BK	15	6	1	8	60	73	–13	23	0	1	0	0
5	Järfälla HC	15	4	2	9	56	73	–17	18	1	0	1	0
6	Nacka HK	15	4	1	10	49	69	–20	13	0	0	0	1

=== Division 1E ===
* Teams 1–4 play the second half of the season in Allettan Södra.
* Teams 5–10 continue in the same group

#	Team	GP	W	T	L	GF	GA	GD	TP	OTW	OTL	GWSW	GWSL
1	HC Vita Hästen	27	21	4	2	112	55	+57	70	2	0	1	1
2	Skövde IK	27	15	5	7	91	75	+16	55	4	0	1	0
3	Vimmerby HC	27	15	3	9	102	62	+40	49	1	0	0	2
4	Mariestad BoIS HC	27	11	9	7	88	77	+11	48	4	♙	2	1
5	Västerviks IK	27	13	4	10	93	81	+12	45	1	1	1	1
6	Tranås AIF IF	27	12	5	10	88	71	+17	42	0	3	1	1
7	Kumla HC "Black Bulls"	27	9	6	12	75	88	–13	34	0	3	1	2
8	IFK Arboga IK	27	6	5	16	83	111	–28	25	1	3	1	0
9	Grästorps IK	27	7	0	20	6	122	–59	21	0	0	0	0
10	Mjölby HC	27	3	5	19	57	110	–53	16	2	3	0	0

==== Division 1E continuation series ====
* Team 1 continues to Playoff 1
* Teams 5 and 6 are forced to play Kvalserie E to requalify for Division 1

#	Team	GP	W	T	L	GF	GA	GD	TP	OTW	OTL	GWSW	GWSL
1	Tranås AIF IF	15	10	2	3	61	41	+20	40	1	0	1	0
2	Västerviks IK	15	9	1	5	58	38	+20	37	1	0	0	0
3	Kumla HC "Black Bulls"	15	10	0	5	53	27	+26	34	0	0	0	0
4	Mjölby HC	15	5	3	7	38	59	–21	19	1	1	0	1
5	IFK Arboga IK	15	4	1	10	48	61	–13	16	0	0	1	0
6	Grästorps IK	15	2	3	10	27	59	–32	10	0	2	0	1

=== Division 1F ===
* Teams 1–4 play the second half of the season in Allettan Södra.
* Teams 5–11 continue in the same group

#	Team	GP	W	T	L	GF	GA	GD	TP	OTW	OTL	GWSW	GWSL
1	Kallinge-Ronneby IF	30	23	5	2	124	57	+67	77	0	0	3	2
2	Olofströms IK	30	16	3	11	114	83	+31	54	0	0	3	0
3	Kristianstads IK	30	15	5	10	79	71	+8	52	0	2	2	1
4	Mörrums GoIS IK	30	14	5	11	92	73	+19	51	2	0	2	1
5	Helsingborgs HC	30	12	9	9	87	81	+6	49	1	1	3	4
6	Halmstad HF	30	12	5	13	78	82	–4	42	0	1	1	3
7	Nybro Vikings	30	10	7	13	65	67	–2	40	1	1	2	3
8	IK Pantern	30	11	5	14	82	85	–3	39	1	1	0	3
9	Nittorps IK	30	12	2	16	69	110	–41	39	1	0	0	1
10	Borås HC	30	9	5	16	68	87	–19	35	1	1	2	1
11	Kungälvs IK	30	3	5	22	54	116	–62	17	2	2	1	0

==== Division 1F continuation series ====
* Team 1 continues to Playoff 1
* Teams 5–7 are forced to play Kvalserie F to requalify for Division 1

#	Team	GP	W	T	L	GF	GA	GD	TP	OTW	OTL	GWSW	GWSL
1	Halmstad HF	12	9	0	3	43	24	+19	33	0	0	0	0
2	Helsingborgs HC	12	7	2	3	40	26	+14	32	0	1	1	0
3	IK Pantern	12	6	2	4	36	27	+9	23	0	0	1	1
4	Nybro Vikings	12	5	2	5	29	26	+3	22	1	1	0	0
5	Borås HC	12	5	1	6	30	36	–6	17	0	0	1	0
6	Kungälvs IK	12	4	3	5	24	30	–6	17	1	0	1	1
7	Nittorps IK	12	0	2	10	16	49	–33	3	0	0	0	2

== Allettan groups ==
=== Allettan Norra ===
* Qualifies for Playoff 3
* Qualifies for Playoff 2
* Qualifies for Playoff 1

#	Team	GP	W	T	L	GF	GA	GD	TP	OTW	OTL	GWSW	GWSL
1	IF Björklöven	14	13	0	1	66	19	+47	39	0	0	0	0
2	IF Sundsvall Hockey	14	10	2	2	66	30	+36	33	1	0	0	1
3	Piteå HC	14	8	3	3	66	30	+36	28	0	1	1	1
4	Kiruna IF	14	6	3	5	48	40	+8	24	2	0	1	0
5	Östersunds IK	14	8	0	6	41	33	+8	24	0	0	0	0
6	Tegs SK	14	3	1	10	26	54	–28	10	0	1	0	0
7	Örnsköldsvik HF	14	1	1	12	22	67	–45	5	1	0	0	0
8	Kovlands IshF	14	1	2	11	26	74	–48	5	0	2	0	0

=== Allettan Mellan ===
* Qualifies for Playoff 3
* Qualifies for Playoff 2
* Qualifies for Playoff 1

#	Team	GP	W	T	L	GF	GA	GD	TP	OTW	OTL	GWSW	GWSL
1	Visby/Roma HK	14	10	2	2	52	37	+15	33	1	1	0	0
2	Huddinge IK	14	8	5	1	66	39	+27	31	2	0	0	3
3	Enköpings SK HK	14	7	3	4	62	44	+18	26	0	1	2	0
4	Åker/Strängnäs HC	14	8	1	5	55	60	–5	25	0	1	0	0
5	Nyköpings HK	14	8	0	6	60	39	+21	24	0	0	0	0
6	Hudiksvalls HC	14	4	2	8	45	51	–6	15	0	0	1	1
7	Falu IF	14	2	1	11	46	75	–29	8	0	0	1	0
8	Lindlövens IF	14	2	0	12	33	74	–41	6	0	0	0	0

=== Allettan Södra ===
* Qualifies for Playoff 3
* Qualifies for Playoff 2
* Qualifies for Playoff 1

#	Team	GP	W	T	L	GF	GA	GD	TP	OTW	OTL	GWSW	GWSL
1	HC Vita Hästen	14	10	1	3	43	29	+14	31	0	0	0	1
2	Olofströms IK	14	7	5	2	46	28	+18	28	0	1	2	2
3	Kallinge-Ronneby IF	14	8	2	4	46	35	+11	26	0	0	0	2
4	Vimmerby HC	14	5	3	6	37	33	+4	21	1	0	2	0
5	Mariestad BoIS HC	14	6	2	6	34	41	–7	21	1	1	0	0
6	Skövde IK	14	4	3	7	38	46	–8	16	0	2	1	0
7	Kristianstads IK	14	3	2	9	36	51	–15	13	2	0	0	0
8	Mörrums GoIS IK	14	2	4	8	27	44	–17	12	1	1	1	1

== Promotion playoffs ==
The top four teams from the Allettan groups, as well as the group winner in each of the continuation series, qualify for the playoffs. At the end of the playoffs there are four teams left, which get to participate in Kvalserien till HockeyAllsvenskan, which determines which clubs will play in Sweden's second-tier league HockeyAllsvenskan for the following season.

The Allettan group winners, along with the best-ranked second place team, skip to the third round. The remaining second place teams, plus one third place team enter in the second round. The remaining third and fourth place teams from the Allettan groups meet the winners of the continuation groups in the first round.

All of the playoff match-ups are best-of-three series with the lower seeded team starting with one game at home, followed by two games (if necessary) on the home ice of the higher-seed.

=== Playoff 1 ===
==== Kiruna IF vs Vännäs HC (2 – 0) ====
February 21, 2013; 19:00	Vännäs HC	3 – 4 (0–1, 1–2, 2–1)	Kiruna IF	Vännäs Ishall, Vännäs; Attendance: 314

Game reference
6 min	Penalties	6 min
29	Shots	39

February 23, 2013; 15:00	Kiruna IF	10 – 3 (6–0, 2–3, 2–0)	Vännäs HC	Lombiahallen, Kiruna; Attendance: 525

Game reference
6 min	Penalties	33 min
48	Shots	20

==== Piteå HC vs Sollefteå HK (2 – 0) ====
February 21, 2013; 19:00	Sollefteå HK	2 – 5 (1–3, 1–0, 0–2)	Piteå HC	Niphallen, Sollefteå; Attendance: 397

Game reference
12 min	Penalties	10 min
28	Shots	35

February 23, 2013; 15:00	Piteå HC	10 – 2 (2–0, 4–1, 4–1)	Sollefteå HK	LF Arena, Piteå; Attendance: 503

Game reference
8 min	Penalties	10 min
49	Shots	16

==== Åker/Strängnäs HC vs Borlänge HF (0 – 2) ====
February 21, 2013; 19:00	Borlänge HF	2 – 3 (0–1, 2–0, 0–2)	Åker/Strängnäs HC	Borlänge Ishall, Borlänge; Attendance: 520

Game reference
6 min	Penalties	8 min
33	Shots	28

February 23, 2013; 15:00	Åker/Strängnäs HC	6 – 1 (1–0, 3–1, 2–0)	Borlänge HF	Åkers Ishall, Åkers styckebruk Attendance: 566

Game reference
24 min	Penalties	12 min
38	Shots	35

==== Enköpings SK HK vs Wings HC Arlanda (2 – 0) ====
February 21, 2012; 19:00	Wings HC Arlanda	2 – 3 OT (1–2, 0–0, 1–2, 0–1)	Enköpings SK HK	Pinbackshallen, Märsta; Attendance: 353

Game reference
6 min	Penalties	6 min
43	Shots	35

February 23, 2012; 18:30	Enköpings SK HK	3 – 2 (3–0, 0–1, 0–1)	Wings HC Arlanda	Bahcohallen, Enköping; Attendance: 627

Game reference
6 min	Penalties	10 min
27	Shots	31

==== Vimmerby HC vs Tranås AIF IF (1 – 2) ====
February 21, 2013; 19:00	Tranås AIF IF	6 – 3 (0–2, 2–1, 4–0)	Vimmerby HC	Bredstorpshallen, Tranås; Attendance: 1502

Game reference
10 min	Penalties	8 min
39	Shots	38

February 23, 2013; 15:00	Vimmerby HC	5 – 2 (3–1, 0–1, 2–0)	Tranås AIF IF	Vimmerby Ishall, Vimmerby; Attendance: 1248

Game reference
10 min	Penalties	53 min
50	Shots	32

February 24, 2013; 16:00	Vimmerby HC	2 – 4 (1–1, 1–0, 0–3)	Tranås AIF IF	Vimmerby Ishall, Vimmerby; Attendance: 1210

Game reference
14 min	Penalties	6 min
30	Shots	38

==== Kallinge-Ronneby IF vs Halmstad HF (2 – 0) ====
February 21, 2013; 19:00	Halmstad HF	1 – 2 (1–0, 0–2, 0–0)	Kallinge-Ronneby IF	Halmstad Arena, Halmstad; Attendance: 1685

Game reference
31 min	Penalties	35 min
27	Shots	21

February 23, 2013; 15:00	Kallinge-Ronneby IF	3 – 2 OT (1–1, 1–1, 0–0, 1–0)	Halmstad HF	Kockumhallen, Kallinge; Attendance: 1099

Game reference
12 min	Penalties	22 min
41	Shots	23

=== Playoff 2 ===
==== Piteå HC vs Åker/Strängnäs HC (2 – 0) ====
February 28, 2013; 19:00	Åker/Strängnäs HC	2 – 3 (0–1, 1–1, 1–1)	Piteå HC	Åkers Ishall, Åkers styckebruk Attendance: 635

Game reference
12 min	Penalties	8 min
22	Shots	31

March 2, 2013; 15:00	Piteå HC	8 – 3 (1–1, 5–2, 2–0)	Åker/Strängnäs HC	LF Arena, Piteå; Attendance: 839

Game reference
28 min	Penalties	18 min
29	Shots	23

==== Enköpings SK HK vs Kiruna IF (0 – 2) ====
February 28, 2013; 19:00	Kiruna IF	6 – 3 (4–0, 0–2, 2–1)	Enköpings SK HK	Lombiahallen, Kiruna; Attendance: 1525

Game reference
31 min	Penalties	12 min
48	Shots	25

March 2, 2013; 15:00	Enköpings SK HK	3 – 5 (1–1, 0–4, 2–0)	Kiruna IF	Bahcohallen, Enköping; Attendance: 775

Game reference
8 min	Penalties	4 min
25	Shots	36

==== Huddinge IK vs Kallinge-Ronneby IF (2 – 1) ====
February 28, 2013; 19:00	Kallinge-Ronneby IF	4 – 3 (3–1, 0–2, 1–0)	Huddinge IK	Kockumhallen, Kallinge; Attendance: 1219

Game reference
8 min	Penalties	12 min
33	Shots	23

March 2, 2013; 15:00	Huddinge IK	4 – 1 (1–0, 2–1, 1–0)	Kallinge-Ronneby IF	Björkängshallen, Huddinge; Attendance: 873

Game reference
12 min	Penalties	6 min
26	Shots	46

March 3, 2013; 16:00	Huddinge IK	6 – 3 (3–2, 1–0, 2–1)	Kallinge-Ronneby IF	Björkängshallen, Huddinge; Attendance: 674

Game reference
12 min	Penalties	10 min
26	Shots	33

==== Olofströms IK vs Tranås AIF IF (2 – 0) ====
February 28, 2013; 19:00	Tranås AIF IF	2 – 6 (0–1, 1–2, 1–3)	Olofströms IK	Bredstorpshallen, Tranås; Attendance: 1363

Game reference
16 min	Penalties	16 min
33	Shots	33

March 2, 2013; 15:00	Olofströms IK	4 – 1 (2–0, 1–1, 1–0)	Tranås AIF IF	HBM Arena, Sölvesborg; Attendance: 1092

Game reference
32 min	Penalties	12 min
41	Shots	32

=== Playoff 3 ===
==== IF Björklöven vs Olofströms IK (2 – 0) ====
March 6, 2013; 19:00	Olofströms IK	1 – 4 (0–0, 1–2, 0–2)	IF Björklöven	HBM Arena, Sölvesborg; Attendance: 1489

Game reference
8 min	Penalties	12 min
19	Shots	38

March 8, 2013; 19:00	IF Björklöven	6 – 3 (3–0, 0–0, 3–3)	Olofströms IK	Umeå Arena, Umeå; Attendance: 4369

Game reference
2 min	Penalties	10 min
38	Shots	18

==== Visby/Roma HK vs Huddinge IK (0 – 2) ====
March 6, 2013; 19:00	Huddinge IK	5 – 1 (1–0, 0–0, 4–1)	Visby/Roma HK	Björkängshallen, Huddinge; Attendance: 620

Game reference
4 min	Penalties	18 min
35	Shots	27

March 8, 2013; 19:00	Visby/Roma HK	3 – 4 OT (0–1, 2–2, 1–0, 0–1)	Huddinge IK	Visby Ishall, Visby; Attendance: 1525

Game reference
12 min	Penalties	4 min
42	Shots	27

==== HC Vita Hästen vs Kiruna IF (2 – 0) ====
March 6, 2013; 19:00	Kiruna IF	1 – 3 (0–1, 0–1, 1–1)	HC Vita Hästen	Lombiahallen, Kiruna; Attendance: 2704

Game reference
14 min	Penalties	37 min
26	Shots	24

March 8, 2013; 19:00	HC Vita Hästen	3 – 2 OT (0–0, 2–1, 0–1, 1–0)	Kiruna IF	Himmelstalundshallen, Norrköping; Attendance: 3580

Game reference
33 min	Penalties	41 min
46	Shots	27

==== IF Sundsvall Hockey vs Piteå HC (1 – 2) ====
March 6, 2013; 19:00	Piteå HC	1 – 4 (1–3, 0–0, 0–1)	IF Sundsvall Hockey	LF Arena, Piteå; Attendance: 1359

Game reference
4 min	Penalties	6 min
32	Shots	24

March 8, 2013; 19:00	IF Sundsvall Hockey	1 – 2 (0–1, 1–0, 0–1)	Piteå HC	Gärdehov, Sundsvall; Attendance: 2108

Game reference
12 min	Penalties	14 min
32	Shots	28

March 9, 2013; 15:00	IF Sundsvall Hockey	2 – 5 (0–2, 1–1, 1–2)	Piteå HC	Gärdehov, Sundsvall; Attendance: 804

Game reference
40 min	Penalties	8 min
39	Shots	26

== Kvalserien till HockeyAllsvenskan ==
Joining the Division 1 playoff winners (IF Björklöven, HC Vita Hästen, Huddinge IK and Piteå HC) in this tournament were the two teams from HockeyAllsvenskan with the worst records, Karlskrona HK and Tingsryds AIF. The teams played a double-round robin tournament called Kvalserien till HockeyAllsvenskan, with the top two teams playing the 2013–14 season in HockeyAllsvenskan and the remaining four playing in Division 1.

Umeå-based IF Björklöven, who were Swedish champions in 1987 and were in Sweden's top hockey league as recently as 2001, finished first in the standings, resulting in their return to HockeyAllsvenskan three years after their 2010 demotion to Division 1 due to financial difficulties.

The second and final spot in HockeyAllsvenskan was decided dramatically in the final round. Karlskrona went into the final round one point ahead of Tingsryd in the standings. Each team ended up losing their final match in game winning shots, resulting in Tingsryd being demoted to the 2013–14 Division 1 season.

Key
* Teams 1 and 2 play in the 2013–14 HockeyAllsvenskan.
* Teams 3 through 6 play in Division 1 for the 2013–14 season.
▲ Team was promoted	▼ Team was relegated

#	Team	GP	W	T	L	GF	GA	GD	TP	OTW	OTL	GWSW	GWSL
1	▲IF Björklöven	10	7	0	3	26	19	+7	21	0	0	0	0
2	Karlskrona HK	10	5	2	3	31	27	+4	18	0	0	1	1
3	▼ Tingsryds AIF	10	4	4	2	29	26	+3	17	1	1	0	2
4	HC Vita Hästen	10	4	2	4	31	28	+3	15	0	0	1	1
5	Huddinge IK	10	2	2	6	28	32	–4	10	1	0	1	0
6	Piteå HC	10	2	2	6	19	32	–13	9	0	1	1	0

== Relegation tournaments ==
The worst teams from each continuation series play a relegation tournament called Kvalserien till Division 1 with the winners from Division 2, in order to qualify for the 2013–14 Division 1 season.

Division 1 was contracted to 53 teams for the 2013–14 season. This, along with the fact that some clubs chose not to contest relegation, caused some situations where a team was relegated without a team being promoted, or vice versa.

Key
* Teams play in the 2013–14 Division 1 season.
* Teams play in Division 2 for the 2013–14 season.
▲ Team was promoted	▼ Team was relegated

=== Kvalserie A ===
Kvalserie A resulted in Kalix UHC retaining their spot in Division 1, and Bodens HF being demoted to Division 2 for 2013–14.

#	Team	GP	W	T	L	GF	GA	GD	TP	OTW	OTL	GWSW	GWSL
1	Kalix UHC	4	4	0	0	22	7	+15	12	0	0	0	0
2	SK Lejon	4	2	0	2	15	20	–5	6	0	0	0	0
3	▼ Bodens HF	4	0	0	4	14	24	–10	0	0	0	0	0

=== Kvalserie B ===
From group B, Njurunda SK, who finished last in Division 1B's continuation round, elected to drop out of Division 1 prior to the start of Kvalserien. What resulted was a competition with two Division 1B teams (Brunflo IK and Kramfors-Alliansen) competing over a single Division 1 spot against two challengers from Division 2 (Husum HK and IFK Nyland). Kvalserie B ended with Brunflo IK in first place, successfully defending their position in Division 1, and with Kramfors-Alliansen being demoted to Division 2 for the 2013–14 season.

#	Team	GP	W	T	L	GF	GA	GD	TP	OTW	OTL	GWSW	GWSL
1	Brunflo IK	6	5	0	1	49	19	+30	15	0	0	0	0
2	▼ Kramfors-Alliansen	6	5	0	1	38	15	+23	15	0	0	0	0
3	Husum HK	6	1	1	4	21	30	–9	5	0	0	1	0
4	IFK Nyland	6	0	1	5	11	55	–44	1	0	0	0	1

=== Kvalserie C ===
#	Team	GP	W	T	L	GF	GA	GD	TP	OTW	OTL	GWSW	GWSL
1	▲ Gnesta IK	6	4	0	2	23	14	+9	12	0	0	0	0
2	Skedvi/Säter IF	6	4	0	2	17	13	+4	12	0	0	0	0
3	▼ Valbo HC	6	3	0	3	17	18	–1	9	0	0	0	0
4	Hofors HC	6	1	0	5	11	2	–11	3	0	0	0	0

=== Kvalserie D ===
From group D, Järfälla HC opted not to defend their spot in Division 1 due to their financial situation, and thereby accepted relegation to Division 2. This meant that there was an open spot available in Division 1D for one of the challengers from Division 2, Bajen Fans IF, Haninge HF and Värmdö HC. Kvalserie D resulted in Bajen Fans IF (which the following off-season was renamed Hammarby Hockey) winning the group, thereby securing promotion, while Nacka HK came in second, thereby successfully defending their spot in Division 1.

#	Team	GP	W	T	L	GF	GA	GD	TP	OTW	OTL	GWSW	GWSL
1	▲ Bajen Fans IF	6	5	1	0	32	21	+11	16	0	1	0	0
2	Nacka HK	6	4	0	2	28	23	+5	12	0	0	0	0
3	Haninge HF	6	0	2	4	20	26	–6	4	2	0	0	0
4	Värmdö HC	6	1	1	4	19	29	–10	4	0	1	0	0

=== Kvalserie E ===
#	Team	GP	W	T	L	GF	GA	GD	TP	OTW	OTL	GWSW	GWSL
1	Grästorps IK	8	5	0	3	2	1	+4	15	0	0	0	0
2	▲ Forshaga IF	8	4	2	2	18	16	+2	15	0	1	1	0
3	Grums IK	8	4	2	2	30	27	+3	14	0	0	0	2
4	▼IFK Arboga IK	8	3	2	3	29	2	+5	13	1	0	1	0
5	HC Dalen	8	1	0	7	17	31	–14	3	0	0	0	0

=== Kvalserie F ===
#	Team	GP	W	T	L	GF	GA	GD	TP	OTW	OTL	GWSW	GWSL
1	Borås HC	10	7	1	2	3	17	+18	23	0	0	1	0
2	Nittorps IK	10	7	1	2	3	21	+13	23	0	0	1	0
3	▼ Kungälvs IK	10	6	2	2	23	1	+7	21	1	0	0	1
4	Tyringe SoSS	10	4	1	5	3	3	–2	13	0	0	0	1
5	Lund Giants HC	10	2	1	7	19	3	–16	7	0	1	0	0
6	Alvesta SK	10	0	2	8	17	37	–20	3	0	0	1	1
