= 1985–86 Division 1 season (Swedish ice hockey) =

- League: Division 1
- Sport: Ice hockey
- Teams: 40
- Promoted to Division 1: Skellefteå AIK to Elitserien
- Relegated to Division 2: IFK Kiruna; Skövde IK; Malungs IF; Hanhals BK

Division 1 seasons
- ← 1984–85 1986–87 →

1985–86 was the 11th season that Division 1 operated as the second tier of ice hockey in Sweden, below the top-flight Elitserien (now the Swedish Hockey League).

== Format ==
Division 1 was divided into four starting groups of 10 teams each. The top two teams in each group qualified for the Allsvenskan, while the remaining eight teams had to compete in a qualifying round in which the results carried over from the first round. The top two teams from each qualifying round qualified for the playoffs. The last team in each of the qualifying groups was relegated directly to Division 2, while the second-to-last-place team had to play in a relegation series.

Of the eight teams in the Allsvenskan, the top two teams played a best out of five final, where the winning team qualified directly for promotion to the Elitserien (now the SHL), while the losing team qualified for the Kvalserien, which offered another opportunity to be promoted. The third to sixth ranked teams in the Allsvenskan qualified for the second round of the playoffs. The two playoff winners qualified for the Kvalserien, in which the first-place team qualified for the following Elitserien season.

== Regular season ==
=== Northern Group ===
==== First round ====
	Club	GP	W	T	L	GF	GA	Pts
1.	Skellefteå AIK	18	17	1	0	143	27	35
2.	Timrå IK	18	11	4	3	98	62	26
3.	Piteå HC	18	10	1	7	93	88	21
4.	CRIF	18	9	2	7	76	85	20
5.	Tegs SK	18	8	2	8	72	82	18
6.	Sollefteå HK	18	7	1	10	71	74	15
7.	Östersunds IK	18	6	0	12	54	72	12
8.	IFK Kiruna	18	6	0	12	71	110	12
9.	Bodens BK	18	5	1	12	63	109	11
10.	Kiruna AIF	18	3	4	11	58	90	10

==== Qualification round ====
	Club	GP	W	T	L	GF	GA	Pts
1.	Piteå HC	32	18	4	10	166	149	40
2.	CRIF	32	17	2	13	140	136	36
3.	Sollefteå HK	32	14	3	15	122	127	31
4.	Tegs SK	32	13	2	17	124	148	28
5.	Bodens BK	32	12	2	18	130	165	26
6.	Östersunds IK	32	12	1	19	98	127	25
7.	Kiruna AIF	32	9	5	18	107	145	23
8.	IFK Kiruna	32	10	2	20	130	172	22

=== Eastern Group ===
==== First round ====
	Club	GP	W	T	L	GF	GA	Pts
1.	Örebro IK	18	13	3	2	111	47	29
2.	Huddinge IK	18	12	4	2	125	52	28
3.	IK Vita Hästen	18	13	2	3	102	76	28
4.	Västerås IK	18	12	1	5	109	72	25
5.	Mariestads BoIS	18	9	3	6	92	77	21
6.	Grums IK	18	6	4	8	77	103	16
7.	Nacka HK	18	6	2	10	81	77	14
8.	Bofors IK	18	6	2	10	84	102	14
9.	IK Westmannia	18	1	1	16	48	132	3
10.	Skövde IK	18	1	0	17	44	135	2

==== Qualification round ====
	Club	GP	W	T	L	GF	GA	Pts
1.	Västerås IK	32	21	3	8	208	117	45
2.	IK Vita Hästen	32	21	2	9	184	142	44
3.	Mariestads BoIS	32	16	4	12	173	145	36
4.	Grums IK	32	14	7	11	157	177	35
5.	Bofors IK	32	14	3	15	172	174	31
6.	Nacka HK	32	13	4	15	160	151	30
7.	IK Westmannia	32	3	1	28	111	250	7
8.	Skövde IK	32	3	1	28	100	246	7

=== Western Group ===
==== First round ====
	Club	GP	W	T	L	GF	GA	Pts
1.	Strömsbro/Gävle	18	14	2	2	127	50	30
2.	Hammarby IF	18	14	2	2	112	45	30
3.	Mora IK	18	11	2	5	100	77	24
4.	Sundsvall IF	18	10	2	6	82	65	22
5.	Skutskärs SK	18	8	1	9	77	89	17
6.	Väsby IK	18	7	2	9	74	76	16
7.	Vallentuna BK	18	7	1	10	79	83	15
8.	Falu IF	18	6	1	11	71	93	13
9.	Hofors HC	18	3	2	13	51	113	8
10.	Malungs IF	18	2	1	15	46	128	5

==== Qualification round ====
	Club	GP	W	T	L	GF	GA	Pts
1.	Mora IK	32	22	3	7	184	118	47
2.	Sundsvall IF	32	20	3	9	164	107	43
3.	Vallentuna BK	32	19	1	12	152	123	39
4.	Skutskärs SK	32	15	2	15	134	139	32
5.	Väsby IK	32	13	2	17	142	128	28
6.	Falu IF	32	9	2	21	129	168	20
7.	Hofors HC	32	4	4	24	75	224	12
8.	Malungs IF	32	4	3	25	93	210	11

=== Southern Group ===
==== First round ====
	Club	GP	W	T	L	GF	GA	Pts
1.	Västra Frölunda HC	18	15	1	2	107	50	32
2.	IF Troja-Ljungby	18	13	0	5	109	42	31
3.	Rögle BK	18	11	3	4	84	53	22
4.	Malmö IF	18	11	1	6	109	87	20
5.	Mölndals IF	18	9	0	9	76	92	19
6.	HC Dalen	18	7	1	10	79	98	17
7.	Mörrums GoIS	18	6	1	11	92	104	13
8.	Tingsryds AIF	18	5	2	11	73	84	11
9.	Nybro IF	18	5	0	13	62	98	9
10.	Hanhals BK	18	3	1	14	67	150	6

==== Qualification round ====
	Club	GP	W	T	L	GF	GA	Pts
1.	Rögle BK	32	21	5	6	174	98	47
2.	Malmö IF	32	21	3	8	199	136	45
3.	Mölndals IF	32	14	2	16	132	152	30
4.	HC Dalen	32	13	3	16	156	177	29
5.	Mörrums GoIS	32	12	3	17	165	172	27
6.	Nybro IF	32	13	1	18	121	146	27
7.	Tingsryds AIF	32	9	5	18	131	150	23
8.	Hanhals BK	32	3	1	28	106	277	7

== Allsvenskan ==
	Club	GP	W	T	L	GF	GA	Pts
1.	Skellefteå AIK	14	10	2	2	74	37	22
2.	Huddinge IK	14	7	3	4	57	37	17
3.	Strömsbro/Gävle	14	6	3	5	56	40	15
4.	Västra Frölunda HC	14	5	5	4	58	48	15
5.	Örebro IK	14	6	3	5	56	56	15
6.	Hammarby IF	14	5	4	5	44	45	14
7.	IF Troja-Ljungby	14	5	1	8	43	53	11
8.	Timrå IK	14	1	1	12	37	109	3

== Playoffs ==
=== Allsvenskan final ===
- Skellefteå HC - Huddinge IK 3:0 (4:3 otw, 5:4 otw, 6:4)

=== First round ===
- Piteå HC - IK Vita Hästen 0:2 (1:8, 3:10)
- Västerås IK - CRIF 2:0 (6:1, 14:3)
- Mora IK - Malmö IF 0:2 (5:6, 5:10)
- Rögle BK - Sundsvall IF 2:0 (4:3, 5:4)

=== Second round ===
- Strömsbro/Gävle - IK Vita Hästen 2:1 (5:8, 5:4, 4:3)
- Västra Frölunda HC - Västerås IK 1:2 (5:4, 5:8, 7:8)
- Örebro IK - Malmö IF 2:0 (8:0, 4:3)
- Hammarby IF - Rögle BK 2:1 (1:2, 2:1, 9:2)

=== Third round ===
- Örebro IK - Västerås IK 0:2 (3:4, 4:9)
- Hammarby IF - Strömsbro/Gävle 2:0 (9:4, 4:2)
