= 2004–05 Division 1 season (Swedish ice hockey) =

- League: Division 1
- Sport: Ice hockey
- Number of teams: 48
- Promoted to Division 1: AIK
- Relegated to Division 2: Bräcke IK; Sollentuna HC; Mölndals IF; Tyringe SoSS

Division 1 seasons
- ← 2003–04 2005–06 →

2004–05 was the sixth season that Division 1 functioned as the third-level of ice hockey in Sweden, below the second-level Allsvenskan and the top-level Elitserien (now the SHL).

== Format ==
The league was divided into four regional groups. In each region, the top teams qualified for the Kvalserien till Allsvenskan, for the opportunity to be promoted to the Allsvenskan. The bottom teams in each group were forced to play in a relegation round against the top teams from Division 2 in order to retain their spot in Division 1 for the following season. These were also conducted within each region.

== Season ==
=== Northern region ===
==== Regular season ====
	Club	GP	W	OTW	T	OTL	L	GF	GA	Pts
1.	Kovlands IF	32	20	4	0	3	5	140	99	71
2.	Kiruna IF	32	22	0	2	2	6	143	88	70
3.	Jämtland HF	32	20	2	0	1	9	145	91	65
4.	Asplöven HC	32	19	2	0	2	9	159	112	63
5.	LN 91	32	15	5	4	1	7	124	90	60
6.	Brunflo IK	32	14	2	2	3	11	133	122	51
7.	Vännäs HC	32	9	4	1	1	17	117	130	37
8.	Clemensnäs HC	32	10	1	2	3	16	104	131	37
9.	Älvsby IF	32	10	1	2	3	16	97	133	37
10.	AIK Härnösand	32	7	1	2	3	19	103	140	28
11.	Överkalix IF	32	6	2	3	1	20	87	144	26
12.	Bräcke IK	32	4	1	4	2	21	74	146	20

==== Relegation ====
	Club	GP	W	T	L	GF	GA	Pts
1.	Överkalix IF	6	4	0	2	24	24	12
2.	Storfors AIK	6	3	2	1	21	15	11
3.	Njurunda SK	6	2	1	3	18	19	7
4.	Kramfors	6	1	1	4	19	24	4

=== Western region ===
==== Regular season ====
	Club	GP	W	OTW	T	OTL	L	GF	GA	Pts
1.	Örebro HK	30	24	1	1	0	4	173	79	75
2.	Grums IK	30	20	2	1	1	6	119	88	66
3.	IFK Kumla	30	17	1	1	2	9	130	97	56
4.	Borlänge HF	30	15	1	3	2	9	101	83	52
5.	Sunne IK	30	12	2	0	4	12	99	93	44
6.	Skåre BK	30	11	3	3	1	12	109	100	43
7.	Valbo AIF	30	12	0	0	1	17	88	95	37
8.	Surahammars IF	30	8	1	4	1	16	102	143	31
9.	Falu IF	30	9	1	1	0	19	87	120	30
10.	Forshaga IF	30	8	1	0	1	20	86	140	27
11.	Hille/Åbyggeby IK	30	6	3	0	3	18	93	149	27

==== Relegation ====
	Club	GP	W	T	L	GF	GA	Pts
1.	Lindlövens IF	4	3	0	1	20	10	9
2.	Hille/Åbyggeby IK	4	2	0	2	12	16	6
3.	Malungs IF	4	1	0	3	12	18	3

=== Eastern region ===
==== Regular season ====
	Club	GP	W	OTW	T	OTL	L	GF	GA	Pts
1.	AIK	36	27	1	1	4	3	153	61	88
2.	Arlanda HC	36	25	1	3	2	5	173	81	82
3.	Väsby IK	36	19	5	5	3	4	144	108	75
4.	Järfälla HC	36	17	4	3	1	11	125	105	63
5.	Botkyrka HC	36	17	3	2	2	12	138	113	61
6.	Haninge Hockey	36	16	0	2	3	15	133	126	53
7.	Trångsunds IF	36	16	0	1	1	18	129	125	50
8.	Värmdö HC	36	12	3	2	2	17	118	133	46
9.	Linden Hockey	36	13	0	4	0	19	112	115	43
10.	Mälarhöjden/Bredäng	36	13	0	0	2	21	122	177	41
11.	Vallentuna BK	36	10	2	2	1	21	107	149	37
12.	Sollentuna HC	36	7	2	1	2	24	96	162	28
13.	Tierp Hockey	36	5	2	2	0	27	84	179	21

==== Relegation ====
	Club	GP	W	OTW	T	OTL	L	GF	GA	Pts
1.	Enköpings SK	10	8	0	0	0	2	35	20	24
2.	Tierp Hockey	10	7	0	0	0	3	48	28	21
3.	Lidingö HC	10	5	0	0	0	5	34	31	15
4.	Skå IK	10	4	0	0	0	6	33	42	12
5.	Sollentuna HC	10	3	0	0	0	7	27	38	9
6.	IFK Osteråker	10	3	0	0	0	7	25	43	9

=== Southern region ===
==== First round ====
	Club	GP	W	OTW	T	OTL	L	GF	GA	Pts
1.	Borås HC	36	26	3	0	1	6	149	71	85
2.	Tingsryds AIF	36	22	4	2	3	5	157	107	79
3.	Jonstorps IF	36	21	2	2	2	9	173	124	71
4.	Mariestads BoIS	36	19	4	2	1	10	141	110	68
5.	IK Pantern	36	16	3	2	2	13	120	98	58
6.	Tranås AIF	36	15	3	2	2	14	135	119	55
7.	Olofströms IK	36	15	2	2	2	15	114	113	53
8.	IK Hästen	36	16	0	2	2	16	114	127	52
9.	Osby IK	36	10	1	6	2	17	106	122	40
10.	Motala AIF	36	8	2	3	3	21	91	152	33
11.	Mölndals IF	36	7	1	1	4	23	98	150	28
12.	Tyringe SoSS	36	3	1	1	2	29	90	195	14

==== Final round ====
	Club	GP	W	OTW	T	OTL	L	GF	GA	Pts
1.	Borås HC	6	4	0	0	0	2	24	18	12
2.	Mariestads BoIS	6	2	1	0	1	2	20	20	9
3.	Jonstorps IF	6	2	1	0	0	3	19	28	8
4.	Tingsryds AIF	6	2	0	0	1	3	23	20	0

==== Relegation ====
===== Group A =====
	Club	GP	W	OTW	T	OTL	L	GF	GA	Pts
1.	Motala AIF	10	6	1	2	1	0	47	23	23
2.	Gislaveds SK	10	6	0	1	1	2	38	28	20
3.	Nittorps IK	10	3	2	2	0	3	33	31	15
4.	Mölndals IF	10	4	0	0	1	5	38	39	13
5.	Grästorps IK	10	2	0	2	1	5	33	43	9
6.	Ulricehamns IF	10	1	0	2	0	7	25	50	5

===== Group B =====
	Club	GP	W	OTW	T	OTL	L	GF	GA	Pts
1.	Osby IK	10	7	1	0	0	2	45	23	23
2.	Kristianstads IK	10	6	2	0	1	1	53	32	23
3.	Tyringe SoSS	10	6	0	0	1	3	45	29	19
4.	Helsingborgs HC	10	4	0	1	1	4	44	34	14
5.	Kallinge-Ronneby	10	2	0	1	0	7	30	59	7
6.	HC Dalen	10	1	0	0	0	9	22	62	3
