= 2005–06 Division 1 season (Swedish ice hockey) =

- League: Division 1
- Sport: Ice hockey
- Number of teams: 54
- Promoted to Division 1: Huddinge IK
- Relegated to Division 2: Hille/Åbyggeby; Värmdö HC; Osby IK

Division 1 seasons
- ← 2004–05 2006–07 →

2005–06 was the seventh season that Division 1 functioned as the third-level of ice hockey in Sweden, below the second-level HockeyAllsvenskan and the top-level Elitserien (now the SHL).

== Format ==
The league was divided into six regional groups. In each region, the top teams qualified for the playoffs, from which the winners advanced to the Kvalserien till HockeyAllsvenskan, for the opportunity to be promoted to the HockeyAllsvenskan. The bottom teams in each group were forced to play in a relegation round against the top teams from Division 2 in order to retain their spot in Division 1 for the following season. These were also conducted within each region.

== First round ==
=== Division 1A ===
	Club	GP	W	OTW	T	OTL	L	GF	GA	Pts
1.	Piteå HC	20	19	0	0	1	0	114	31	58
2.	Asplöven HC	20	11	1	3	0	5	75	47	38
3.	Kiruna IF	20	10	1	1	1	7	101	71	34
4.	Clemensnäs HC	20	5	2	4	0	9	64	78	23
5.	Tegs SK	20	4	0	3	1	12	50	96	16
6.	Storfors AIK	20	0	0	3	1	16	40	121	4

==== Placing round 1A ====
	Club	GP	W	OTW	T	OTL	L	GF	GA	Pts
1.	Clemensnäs HC	2	1	0	1	0	0	9	2	4
2.	Tegs SK	2	1	0	1	0	0	10	4	4
3.	Storfors AIK	2	0	0	0	0	2	2	15	0

=== Division 1B ===
	Club	GP	W	OTW	T	OTL	L	GF	GA	Pts
1.	Jämtland HF	24	15	1	4	1	3	102	45	52
2.	AIK Härnösand	24	13	3	2	1	5	101	73	48
3.	Brunflo IK	24	12	0	3	1	8	100	65	40
4.	Kovlands IF	24	11	0	2	3	8	93	76	38
5.	LN 91	24	9	3	4	0	8	95	73	37
6.	Njurunda SK	24	3	0	3	2	16	55	114	14
7.	Kramfors	24	3	1	2	0	18	55	155	13

==== Placing round 1B ====
	Club	GP	W	OTW	T	OTL	L	GF	GA	Pts
1.	Kovlands IF	6	5	0	1	0	0	42	14	16
2.	LN 91	6	4	0	1	0	1	31	18	13
3.	Kramfors	6	1	0	1	0	4	18	28	4
4.	Njurunda SK	6	0	0	1	0	5	11	42	1

=== Division 1C ===
	Club	GP	W	OTW	T	OTL	L	GF	GA	Pts
1.	Borlänge HF	36	25	0	3	1	7	183	83	79
2.	Valbo AIF	36	21	2	1	2	10	149	90	70
3.	Uppsala HC	36	18	5	4	1	10	157	113	69
4.	Linden HC	36	19	0	4	2	11	120	105	63
5.	Tierps HK	36	17	0	2	3	14	144	130	56
6.	Falu IF	36	15	1	4	2	14	111	107	53
7.	Arlanda HC	36	14	2	2	1	17	123	136	49
8.	Enköpings SK	36	13	1	3	4	15	114	113	48
9.	Surahammars IF	36	10	5	1	0	20	107	156	31
10.	Hille/Åbyggeby	36	0	0	0	0	36	55	230	0

=== Division 1D ===
	Club	GP	W	OTW	T	OTL	L	GF	GA	Pts
1.	Huddinge IK	36	28	2	2	1	3	180	61	91
2.	Väsby IK	36	27	1	2	0	6	174	97	85
3.	IK Hästen	36	19	1	4	0	12	143	120	63
4.	Vallentuna BK	36	19	1	1	1	14	151	119	61
5.	Mälarhöjden/B.	36	16	1	1	1	17	128	121	52
6.	Järfälla HC	36	13	1	1	1	20	121	139	43
7.	Botkyrka HC	36	13	0	0	4	19	118	160	43
8.	Haninge Hockey	36	13	0	0	2	21	122	146	41
9.	Trångsunds IF	36	11	1	2	1	21	105	157	38
10.	Värmdö HC	36	3	3	1	0	29	80	202	16

=== Division 1E ===
	Club	GP	W	OTW	T	OTL	L	GF	GA	Pts
1.	Mariestads BoIS	32	26	0	0	0	6	150	70	78
2.	Örebro HK	32	23	2	2	0	5	165	72	75
3.	Skövde IK	32	19	0	1	1	11	123	83	59
4.	Grums IK	32	13	2	4	0	13	109	99	47
5.	IFK Kumla	32	12	1	3	2	14	87	122	43
6.	Skåre BK	32	11	1	0	3	17	96	140	38
7.	Montala AIF	32	8	1	3	3	17	97	144	32
8.	Sunne IK	32	7	3	4	0	18	77	114	31
9.	Lindlövens IF	32	5	0	4	1	23	71	131	19

=== Division 1F ===
	Club	GP	W	OTW	T	OTL	L	GF	GA	Pts
1.	Tingsryds AIF	44	28	1	4	2	9	199	119	92
2.	IK Pantern	44	27	1	4	4	8	182	124	91
3.	Borås HC	44	27	2	3	0	12	185	87	88
4.	IF Troja-Ljungby	44	24	1	4	1	14	167	111	79
5.	Jonstorps IF	44	23	2	1	2	16	172	157	76
6.	Kristianstad	44	23	1	3	0	17	157	138	74
7.	Tranås AIF	44	21	1	4	1	17	174	148	70
8.	Olofströms IK	44	19	1	2	2	20	153	146	63
9.	Mörrums GoIS	44	13	4	2	1	24	140	175	50
10.	Gislaveds SK	44	9	2	3	1	29	106	208	35
11.	Tyringe SoSS	44	9	0	2	1	32	100	200	30
12.	Osby IK	44	7	1	2	2	32	106	228	27

== Playoffs ==
=== Final round A/B ===
	Club	GP	W	OTW	T	OTL	L	GF	GA	Pts
1.	Piteå HC	10	8	1	0	0	1	46	11	26
2.	AIK Härnösand	10	6	0	0	1	3	36	28	19
3.	Asplöven HC	10	6	0	0	1	3	34	32	19
4.	Kiruna IF	10	3	1	1	0	5	32	35	12
5.	Brunflo IK	10	2	0	0	1	7	21	41	7
6.	Jämtlands HF	10	1	1	1	0	7	15	37	6

=== Playoffs C/D ===
==== Semifinals ====
- Valbo AIF - Huddinge IK 0:2 (1:6, 2:5)
- Väsby IK - Borlänge HF 1:2 (5:2, 1:4, 1:4)

==== Final ====
- Huddinge IK - Borlänge HF 2:1 (3:0, 2:3 OT, 6:1)

=== Playoffs E/F ===
==== Semifinals ====
- Örebro HK - Tingsryds AIF 2:1 (2:5, 3:1, 3:2 OT)
- IK Pantern - Mariestads BoIS 1:2 (0:6, 5:3, 2:9)

==== Final ====
- Örebro HK - Mariestads BoIS 0:2 (1:2, 2:3 OT)

== Relegation ==
=== Division 1B ===
	Club	GP	W	OTW	T	OTL	L	GF	GA	Pts
1.	Örnsköldsviks SK	4	2	0	0	0	2	15	12	6
2.	Järpens IF	4	1	1	0	1	1	11	10	6
3.	Sunderby SK	4	1	1	0	1	1	9	13	6

=== Division 1C ===
	Club	GP	W	OTW	T	OTL	L	GF	GA	Pts
1.	Surahammars IF	6	4	0	1	1	0	29	12	14
2.	Hudiksvalls HC	6	4	0	0	0	2	34	17	12
3.	Norrtälje IK	6	1	1	0	1	3	22	31	6
4.	Hille/Åbyggeby	6	0	1	1	0	4	16	41	3

=== Division 1D ===
	Club	GP	W	OTW	T	OTL	L	GF	GA	Pts
1.	Nacka HK	6	3	0	2	0	1	23	16	11
2.	Trångsunds IF	6	3	0	1	0	2	22	20	10
3.	Värmdö HC	6	2	0	2	1	1	18	20	9
4.	Skå IK	6	0	1	1	0	4	15	22	3

=== Division 1E ===
	Club	GP	W	OTW	T	OTL	L	GF	GA	Pts
1.	Lindlövens IF	6	3	0	1	0	2	21	18	10
2.	Kungälvs IK	6	2	1	0	1	2	19	23	9
3.	Karlskoga HC	6	2	0	1	1	2	21	20	8
4.	Åmåls SK	6	1	2	0	1	2	23	23	8

=== Division 1F ===
	Club	GP	W	OTW	T	OTL	L	GF	GA	Pts
1.	Tyringe SoSS	6	3	1	0	0	2	29	28	11
2.	Helsingborgs HC	6	3	0	0	1	2	27	22	10
3.	Boro/Vetlanda HC	6	3	0	0	1	2	29	25	10
4.	Osby IK	6	1	1	0	0	4	26	36	1
