= 1986–87 Division 1 season (Swedish ice hockey) =

- League: Division 1
- Sport: Ice hockey
- Number of teams: 40
- Promoted to Division 1: AIK; Väsby IK to Elitserien

Division 1 seasons
- ← 1985–86 1987–88 →

1986–87 was the 12th season that Division 1 operated as the second tier of ice hockey in Sweden, below the top-flight Elitserien (now the Swedish Hockey League).

== Format ==
Division 1 was divided into four starting groups of 10 teams each. The top two teams in each group qualified for the Allsvenskan, while the remaining eight teams had to compete in a qualifying round. The teams were given zero to seven bonus points based on their finish in the first round. The top team from each qualifying round qualified for the playoffs. The last-place team in each of the qualifying groups had to play in a relegation series in an attempt to avoid relegation to Division 2.

Of the eight teams in the Allsvenskan, the top team qualified directly for promotion to the Elitserien (now the SHL), while the second place team qualified for the Kvalserien, which offered another opportunity to be promoted. The third to sixth place teams in the Allsvenskan qualified for the playoffs. The two playoff winners qualified for the Kvalserien, in which the first-place team qualified for the following Elitserien season.

== Regular season ==
=== Northern Group ===
==== First round ====
	Club	GP	W	T	L	GF	GA	Pts
1.	Timrå IK	18	14	1	3	121	77	29
2.	IF Sundsvall	18	13	2	3	92	56	28
3.	Östersunds IK	18	10	3	5	86	76	23
4.	CRIF	18	10	2	6	85	68	22
5.	Sollefteå HK	18	10	1	7	96	86	21
6.	Piteå HC	18	9	0	9	88	94	18
7.	Kiruna AIF	18	5	6	7	78	74	16
8.	Bergnäsets AIK	18	4	2	12	63	104	10
9.	Bodens BK	18	3	1	14	85	126	7
10.	Tegs SK	18	2	2	14	39	72	6

==== Qualification round ====
	Club	GP	W	T	L	GF	GA	Pts (Bonus)
1.	Piteå HC	14	11	2	1	77	56	28(4)
2.	Sollefteå HK	14	7	1	6	58	63	20(5)
3.	Kiruna AIF	14	7	1	6	58	55	18(3)
4.	Bergnäsets AIK	14	6	2	6	62	58	16(2)
5.	Bodens BK	14	7	0	7	77	67	15(1)
6.	Östersunds IK	14	3	2	9	52	64	15(7)
7.	CRIF	14	4	1	9	55	68	15(6)
8.	Tegs SK	14	6	1	7	50	58	13(0)

=== Western Group ===
==== First round ====
	Club	GP	W	T	L	GF	GA	Pts
1.	Västerås IK	18	16	1	1	112	64	33
2.	Örebro IK	18	15	0	3	93	41	30
3.	Huddinge IK	18	13	0	5	96	45	26
4.	Nacka HK	18	12	0	6	76	59	24
5.	Mariestads BoIS	18	9	0	9	68	79	18
6.	IK Vita Hästen	18	8	0	10	65	75	16
7.	Bofors IK	18	7	0	11	76	91	14
8.	IFK Lidingö	18	5	0	13	57	79	10
9.	Grums IK	18	3	1	14	65	107	7
10.	Hammarö HC	18	2	0	16	44	112	4

==== Qualification round ====
	Club	GP	W	T	L	GF	GA	Pts (Bonus)
1.	Huddinge IK	14	12	0	2	85	30	31(7)
2.	Nacka HK	14	11	0	3	83	44	28(6)
3.	Mariestads BoIS	14	8	0	6	54	51	21(5)
4.	IK Vita Hästen	14	8	0	6	63	51	20(4)
5.	Bofors IK	14	6	0	8	61	81	15(3)
6.	IFK Lidingö	14	4	0	10	43	72	10(2)
7.	Grums IK	14	4	0	11	46	71	9(1)
8.	Hammarö HC	14	3	0	11	51	86	6(0)

=== Eastern Group ===
==== First round ====
	Club	GP	W	T	L	GF	GA	Pts
1.	AIK	18	18	0	0	140	33	36
2.	Hammarby IF	18	13	1	4	113	47	27
3.	Väsby IF	18	12	0	6	90	60	24
4.	Mora IK	18	11	1	6	100	71	23
5.	Vallentuna BK	18	8	0	10	60	68	16
6.	Strömsbro/Gävle	18	7	0	11	61	78	14
7.	Skutskärs SK	18	6	1	11	63	84	13
8.	R/A 73 HC	18	6	1	11	69	99	13
9.	Falu IF	18	5	0	13	58	122	10
10.	Hofors HC	18	2	0	16	48	140	4

==== Qualification round ====
	Club	GP	W	T	L	GF	GA	Pts (Bonus)
1.	Väsby IK	14	11	2	1	88	49	31(7)
2.	Mora IK	14	9	0	5	84	50	24(6)
3.	Strömsbro/Gävle	14	7	2	5	55	49	20(4)
4.	Skutskärs SK	14	8	1	5	52	54	20(3)
5.	Vallentuna BK	14	6	2	6	62	58	19(5)
6.	R/A 73 HC	14	5	1	8	63	74	13(2)
7.	Falu IF	14	2	4	8	60	71	9(1)
8.	Hofors HC	14	1	2	11	37	96	4(0)

=== Southern Group ===
==== First round ====
	Club	GP	W	T	L	GF	GA	Pts
1.	Västra Frölunda HC	18	16	1	1	113	45	33
2.	Rögle BK	18	14	2	2	102	61	30
3.	IF Troja-Ljungby	18	10	2	6	86	72	22
4.	Malmö IF	18	8	3	7	79	75	19
5.	Nybro IF	18	9	1	8	69	71	19
6.	Mölndals IF	18	8	2	8	72	66	18
7.	Tyringe SoSS	18	7	0	11	71	83	14
8.	Mörrums GoIS	18	4	2	12	72	110	10
9.	HC Dalen	18	4	1	13	57	94	9
10.	Tingsryds AIF	18	3	0	15	57	101	6

==== Qualification round ====
	Club	GP	W	T	L	GF	GA	Pts (Bonus)
1.	IF Troja-Ljungby	14	11	0	3	80	48	29(7)
2.	Malmö IF	14	9	0	5	74	60	24(6)
3.	Mölndals IF	14	7	0	7	64	50	18(4)
4.	Nybro IF	14	5	1	8	51	59	16(5)
5.	Tingsryds AIF	14	6	2	6	61	67	14(0)
6.	Tyringe SoSS	14	5	0	9	54	60	13(3)
7.	Mörrums GoIS	14	5	1	8	59	77	13(2)
8.	HC Dalen	14	6	0	8	55	77	13(1)

== Allsvenskan ==
	Club	GP	W	T	L	GF	GA	Pts
1.	AIK	14	12	1	1	89	45	25
2.	Örebro IK	14	11	0	3	77	44	22
3.	Västra Frölunda HC	14	10	0	4	73	40	20
4.	Västerås IK	14	7	0	7	54	55	14
5.	Rögle BK	14	5	1	8	53	80	11
6.	Hammarby IF	14	4	2	8	49	60	10
7.	Sundsvall IF	14	3	2	9	53	71	8
8.	Timrå IK	14	1	0	13	48	101	2

== Playoffs ==
=== First round ===
- Västra Frölunda HC - Väsby IK 0:2 (4:5 OT, 1:6)
- Västerås IK - IF Troja-Ljungby 2:1 (10:2, 7:8, 6:2)
- Rögle BK - Huddinge IK 1:2 (2:4, 4:2, 3:5)
- Hammarby IF - Piteå HC 2:0 (4:2, 6:5 OT)

=== Second round ===
- Västerås IK - Huddinge IK 2:1 (6:5, 3:6, 6:1)
- Väsby IK - Hammarby IF 2:1 (3:2 OT, 2:6, 7:2)
