= 2007–08 Division 1 season (Swedish ice hockey) =

- League: Division 1
- Sport: Ice hockey
- Number of teams: 52
- Promoted to Division 1: IF Troja-Ljungby; Mariestad BoIS
- Relegated to Division 2: Falu IF; Uppsala HC; Järfälla HC; Mörrums GoIS; Göteborgs IK

Division 1 seasons
- ← 2006–07 2008–09 →

2007–08 was the ninth season that Division 1 functioned as the third-level of ice hockey in Sweden, below the second-level HockeyAllsvenskan and the top-level Elitserien (now the SHL).

== Format ==
The 52 participating teams played the first half of the season in six groups divided geographically. The successful teams then moved into three new groups (the Allettan groups), while the remaining teams played in a continuation of their smaller existing groups. The teams with the worst records in these continuation groups were then forced to defend their places in Division 1 against challengers from Division 2 (see "relegation tournament" below) in a round-robin tournament called Kvalserien till Division 1. Meanwhile, the successful teams from the Allettan groups along with the group winners of the continuation groups played a playoff to determine who would have a chance to compete for promotion to the second-tier league HockeyAllsvenskan in Kvalserien till HockeyAllsvenskan.

== First round ==
=== Division 1A ===
	Club	GP	W	OTW	T	OTL	L	GF	GA	Pts
1.	Asplöven HC	25	20	0	0	3	2	145	49	63
2.	Kiruna IF	25	18	2	0	0	5	107	54	58
3.	Piteå HC	25	17	2	0	0	6	117	45	55
4.	Clemensnäs HC	25	7	1	1	1	15	55	92	25
5.	Bodens HF	25	4	1	1	1	18	45	108	16
6.	Lycksele SK	25	2	0	0	1	22	36	157	7

=== Division 1B ===
	Club	GP	W	OTW	T	OTL	L	GF	GA	Pts
1.	Kovlands IF	25	16	2	1	1	5	108	65	54
2.	Östersund/Brunflo IF	25	13	2	0	2	8	102	70	45
3.	Hudiksvalls HC	25	14	0	1	1	9	92	77	44
4.	LN 91	25	10	2	1	1	12	93	81	36
5.	AIK Härnösand	25	10	0	0	1	14	70	88	31
6.	Ånge IK	25	4	0	1	0	20	69	153	13

=== Division 1C ===
	Club	GP	W	OTW	T	OTL	L	GF	GA	Pts
1.	Enköpings SK	27	17	4	2	2	2	130	67	63
2.	Borlänge HF	27	15	3	2	1	6	104	75	54
3.	Valbo AIF	27	15	1	2	2	7	100	74	51
4.	IFK Arboga	27	16	0	1	1	9	96	57	50
5.	Surahammars IF	27	14	1	0	2	10	101	83	46
6.	Lindlövens IF	27	8	4	2	1	12	78	96	35
7.	Linden HC	27	10	0	2	2	13	88	86	34
8.	Falu IF	27	9	2	0	0	16	70	105	31
9.	Uppsala HC	27	7	0	3	3	14	69	106	27
10.	Tierps HK	27	1	0	2	1	23	48	135	6

=== Division 1D ===
	Club	GP	W	OTW	T	OTL	L	GF	GA	Pts
1.	HC Vita Hästen	27	22	0	2	0	3	126	62	68
2.	Väsby IK	27	20	2	0	0	5	104	67	64
3.	Mälarhöjden/Br.	27	13	2	0	0	12	105	88	43
4.	Haninge HF	27	12	2	1	2	10	84	90	43
5.	Botkyrka HC	27	11	0	0	4	12	86	93	37
6.	Skå IK	27	12	0	0	1	14	91	109	37
7.	Nacka HK	27	10	0	0	1	16	102	122	31
8.	Trångsunds IF	27	9	0	1	2	15	95	108	30
9.	Arlanda HC	27	7	3	0	0	17	83	105	27
10.	Järfälla HC	27	6	2	0	1	18	83	115	23

=== Division 1E ===
	Club	GP	W	OTW	T	OTL	L	GF	GA	Pts
1.	Örebro HK	27	22	1	1	0	3	140	43	69
2.	Mariestads BoIS	27	19	0	0	2	6	122	64	59
3.	Skåre BK	27	15	1	3	1	7	101	64	51
4.	Skövde IK	27	14	3	1	0	9	106	69	49
5.	Sunne IK	27	14	2	2	1	8	81	70	49
6.	Tranås AIF	27	13	2	2	0	10	106	72	45
7.	IFK Kumla	27	12	0	0	1	14	95	74	37
8.	Ulricehamns IF	27	7	0	0	2	18	70	107	23
9.	IFK Munkfors	27	4	0	1	2	20	58	140	15
10.	Hammarö HC	27	1	0	0	0	26	40	206	3

=== Division 1F ===
	Club	GP	W	OTW	T	OTL	L	GF	GA	Pts
1.	IF Troja-Ljungby	27	20	2	0	1	4	155	57	65
2.	IK Pantern	27	15	2	5	0	5	110	70	54
3.	Tingsryds AIF	27	15	1	2	1	8	111	80	50
4.	Olofströms IK	27	12	0	4	4	7	155	84	44
5.	Kristianstad	27	12	2	3	1	9	97	84	44
6.	Mörrums GoIS	27	13	1	2	1	10	99	102	44
7.	Kungälvs IK	27	9	2	3	2	11	80	83	36
8.	Helsingborgs HC	27	10	1	0	0	16	94	106	32
9.	Gislaveds SK	27	7	1	1	1	17	71	86	25
10.	Göteborgs IK	27	0	0	0	1	26	43	223	1

== AllEttan ==
=== Northern Group (A/B) ===
	Club	GP	W	OTW	T	OTL	L	GF	GA	Pts
1.	Asplöven HC	10	7	0	2	0	1	38	20	23
2.	Östersund/Brunflo IF	10	6	0	0	2	2	45	31	20
3.	Piteå HC	10	3	2	1	2	2	34	31	16
4.	Kiruna IF	10	2	3	1	0	4	36	39	13
5.	Hudiksvalls HC	10	3	0	1	0	6	27	37	10
6.	Kovlands IF	10	1	0	1	1	7	24	46	5

=== Central Group (C/D) ===
	Club	GP	W	OTW	T	OTL	L	GF	GA	Pts
1.	Väsby IK	14	9	0	1	1	3	59	37	29
2.	Valbo AIF	14	9	0	1	1	3	54	38	29
3.	Enköpings SK	14	7	2	1	0	4	41	25	26
4.	HC Vita Hästen	14	6	3	0	1	4	49	37	25
5.	IFK Arboga	14	5	0	1	3	5	37	44	19
6.	Mälarhöjden/Bre.	14	2	1	5	1	5	44	54	14
7.	Borlänge HF	14	3	1	2	0	8	40	55	13
8.	Haninge HF	14	1	0	3	0	10	29	63	6

=== Southern Group (E/F) ===
	Club	GP	W	OTW	T	OTL	L	GF	GA	Pts
1.	IF Troja-Ljungby	14	12	1	0	0	1	65	29	38
2.	Mariestads BoIS	14	9	1	0	0	4	57	32	29
3.	Örebro HK	14	8	0	0	1	5	59	46	25
4.	Tingsryds AIF	14	7	0	2	1	4	55	45	24
5.	Olofströms IK	14	4	0	2	0	8	37	47	14
6.	Skåre BK	14	4	0	0	0	10	38	60	12
7.	IK Pantern	14	2	1	2	1	8	35	59	11
8.	Skövde IK	14	2	1	2	1	8	39	67	11

== Qualification round ==
=== Division 1A ===
	Club	GP	W	OTW	T	OTL	L	GF	GA	Pts (Bonus)
1.	Clemensnäs HC	6	4	2	0	0	0	17	7	18(2)
2.	Bodens HF	6	2	1	0	1	2	21	16	10(1)
3.	Lycksele SK	6	0	0	0	2	4	8	23	2(0)

=== Division 1B ===
	Club	GP	W	OTW	T	OTL	L	GF	GA	Pts (Bonus)
1.	LN 91	6	3	1	0	1	1	29	24	14(2)
2.	AIK Härnösand	6	3	1	0	1	1	29	16	13(1)
3.	Ange IK	6	0	1	0	1	4	22	40	3(0)

=== Division 1C ===
	Club	GP	W	OTW	T	OTL	L	GF	GA	Pts (Bonus)
1.	Lindlövens IF	10	7	1	1	1	0	41	28	31(6)
2.	Linden HC	10	4	1	1	1	3	40	28	20(4)
3.	Surahammars IF	10	1	3	0	1	5	26	39	18(8)
4.	Tierps HK	10	5	0	1	0	4	28	30	16(0)
5.	Falu IF	10	3	0	2	2	3	32	33	15(2)
6.	Uppsala HC	10	1	1	1	1	6	29	38	8(1)

=== Division 1D ===
	Club	GP	W	OTW	T	OTL	L	GF	GA	Pts (Bonus)
1.	Nacka HK	10	6	0	1	1	2	38	27	24(4)
2.	Botkyrka HC	10	5	0	0	0	5	28	30	23(8)
3.	Trångsunds IF	10	5	1	0	0	4	30	27	19(2)
4.	Skå IK	10	4	0	0	0	6	33	44	18(6)
5.	Arlanda HC	10	4	0	1	1	4	32	29	15(1)
6.	Järfälla HC	10	3	1	0	0	6	31	35	11(0)

=== Division 1E ===
	Club	GP	W	OTW	T	OTL	L	GF	GA	Pts (Bonus)
1.	Tranås AIF	10	7	0	1	0	2	50	18	28(6)
2.	IFK Kumla	10	7	0	1	0	2	40	25	26(4)
3.	Sunne IK	10	5	1	0	0	4	40	31	25(8)
4.	IFK Munkfors	10	6	0	1	0	3	38	29	20(1)
5.	Ulricehamns IF	10	2	0	1	0	7	20	34	9(2)
6.	Hammarö HC	10	0	0	0	1	9	12	63	1(0)

=== Division 1F ===
	Club	GP	W	OTW	T	OTL	L	GF	GA	Pts (Bonus)
1.	Kristianstads IK	10	5	2	0	0	3	52	27	27(8)
2.	Gislaveds SK	10	8	0	1	0	1	48	17	26(1)
3.	Helsingborgs HC	10	5	0	2	1	2	45	33	20(1)
4.	Kungälvs IK	10	5	0	1	0	4	35	27	20(4)
5.	Mörrums GoIS	10	2	0	2	1	5	32	31	15(6)
6.	Göteborgs IK	10	0	0	0	0	10	13	90	0(0)

== Playoffs ==
=== First round ===
- Nacka HK - Lindlövens IF 2:0 (5:3, 5:2)
- Kristianstads IK - Tranås AIF 0:2 (2:3 OT, 2:6)
- LN 91 - Clemensnäs HC 1:2 (4:7, 7:3, 2:3)

=== Second round ===
- Tranås AIF - Örebro HK 0:2 (1:5, 1:8)
- Clemensnäs HC - Östersund/Brunflo IF 0:2 (2:7, 1:8)
- Nacka HK - Enköpings SK 0:2 (2:5, 2:12)

=== Final round ===
- Örebro HK - Asplöven HC 1:2 (5:4, 1:4, 3:5)
- Östersund/Brunflo IF - Väsby IK 0:2 (3:4, 4:5)
- Enköpings SK - IF Troja-Ljungby 0:2 (3:4, 2:5)
- Valbo AIF - Mariestads BoIS 1:2 (4:3 OT, 0:3, 5:8)

== Relegation ==
=== Division 1B ===
	Club	GP	W	OTW	T	OTL	L	GF	GA	Pts
1.	Näldens HF	6	4	1	0	0	1	26	20	18
2.	KB 65	6	4	0	0	0	2	28	18	12
3.	Örnsköldsviks SK	6	3	0	0	0	3	24	23	9
4.	Njurunda SK	6	0	0	0	1	5	14	31	1

=== Division 1C ===
	Club	GP	W	OTW	T	OTL	L	GF	GA	Pts
1.	Bålsta HC	8	5	1	0	0	2	35	26	17
2.	Hedemora SK	8	5	0	1	0	2	26	24	16
3.	Falu IF	8	3	0	1	1	3	23	22	11
4.	Uppsala HC	8	3	0	1	0	4	22	23	10
5.	Skedvi/Säter IF	8	1	0	1	0	6	23	34	4

=== Division 1D ===
	Club	GP	W	OTW	T	OTL	L	GF	GA	Pts
1.	Arlanda Wings HC	8	6	1	0	0	1	38	19	20
2.	Visby-Roma HK	8	4	1	0	0	3	40	20	14
3.	Järfälla HC	8	4	0	0	2	2	33	31	14
4.	Nynäshamns IF	8	4	0	0	0	4	28	28	12
5.	Sollentuna HC	8	0	0	0	0	8	10	51	0

=== Division 1E ===
	Club	GP	W	OTW	T	OTL	L	GF	GA	Pts
1.	Ulricehamns IF	6	4	1	0	0	1	18	12	14
2.	Mjölby HC	6	3	0	0	0	3	25	22	9
3.	Grums IK	6	2	1	0	0	3	23	26	8
4.	Karlskoga HF	6	1	0	0	2	3	20	26	5

=== Division 1F ===
	Club	GP	W	OTW	T	OTL	L	GF	GA	Pts
1.	Karlskrona HK	8	8	0	0	0	0	52	27	24
2.	Västerviks IK	8	5	0	0	0	3	48	17	15
3.	Mörrums GoIS	8	4	0	0	0	4	36	21	12
4.	Tyringe SoSS	8	2	0	0	0	6	31	52	6
5.	Göteborgs IK	8	1	0	0	0	7	22	63	3
