= Kvalserien (Hockeyettan) =

Swedish ice hockey tournament

- Current season, competition or edition: 2014 Hockeyettan Kvalserien
- Sport: Ice hockey
- Founded: 1975
- No. of teams: 26
- Country: Sweden
- Promotion to: Hockeyettan
- Relegation to: Division 2
- Website: swehockey.se

Kvalserien, also known as Kvalserien till Hockeyettan, is the Swedish round-robin ice hockey tournament to qualify for participation in the next season of Hockeyettan (formerly named Division 1 until 2014), Sweden's third highest ice hockey league for men.

== Winners 2006–2014 ==
=== Division 1A ===
- 2014: Kovlands IshF
- 2013: Kalix UHC
- 2012: Kalix UHC
- 2011: Kalix UHC, Luleå Rebels HC
- 2010: Clemensnäs HC, Luleå Rebels HC
- 2009: Luleå Rebels HC, Lycksele SK
- 2008: no Kvalserien played
- 2007: Bodens HF
- 2006: no Kvalserien played

=== Division 1B ===
- 2014: Part of Division 1A
- 2013: Brunflo IK
- 2012: Brunflo IK, Kramfors-Alliansen
- 2011: AIK Härnösand, Ånge IK
- 2010: Örnsköldsviks SK, Kramfors-Alliansen
- 2009: Njurunda SK, Örnsköldsviks SK
- 2008: Näldens HF, KB 65
- 2007: Kramfors-Alliansen
- 2006: Örnsköldsviks SK, Järpens IF

=== Division 1C ===
- 2014: Falu IF, IFK Arboga IK
- 2013: Gnesta IK, Skedvi/Säter IF
- 2012: Valbo HC, Surahammars IF
- 2011: Falu IF, Söderhamn/Ljusne
- 2010: IFK Ore, Falu IF
- 2009: Hedemora SK, Järfälla HC
- 2008: Bålsta HC, Hedemora SK
- 2007: Falu IF, Uppsala HC
- 2006: Surahammars IF, Hudiksvalls HC

=== Division 1D ===
- 2014: Värmdö HC, Haninge Anchors HC
- 2013: Bajen Fans IF, Nacka HK
- 2012: Botkyrka HC, Väsby IK HK
- 2011: Värmdö HC, Åkers IF
- 2010: Nacka HK, Järfälla HC
- 2009: Nynäshamns IF, IF Vallentuna BK
- 2008: Wings HC Arlanda, Visby/Roma HK
- 2007: Trångsunds IF, Skå IF
- 2006: Nacka HK, Trångsunds IF

=== Division 1E ===
- 2014: HC Dalen, Forshaga IF
- 2013: Grästorps IK, Forshaga IF
- 2012: Grästorps IK, Västerviks IK
- 2011: Vimmerby HC, Sunne IK
- 2010: Mjölby HC, Grästorps IK
- 2009: Sunne IK, IFK Munkfors
- 2008: Ulricehamns IF, Mjölby HC
- 2007: Hammarö HC, IFK Munkfors
- 2006: Lindlövens IF, Kungälvs IK

=== Division 1F ===
- 2014: IK Pantern, Nybro Vikings IF
- 2013: Borås HC, Nittorps IK
- 2012: Kungälvs IK, IK Pantern
- 2011: Helsingborgs HC, Kallinge-Ronneby
- 2010: Kungälvs IK, Mörrums GoIS IK
- 2009: Halmstad HF, Mörrums GoIS IK
- 2008: Karlskrona HK, Västerviks IK
- 2007: Göteborgs IK, Ulricehamns IF
- 2006: Tyringe SoSS, Helsingborgs HC

== Winners 2015–present ==
=== Hockeyettan North ===
- 2015: TBD

=== Hockeyettan South ===
- 2015: TBD

=== Hockeyettan East ===
- 2015: TBD

=== Hockeyettan West ===
- 2015: TBD
