= Patric Kjellberg =

Swedish ice hockey player

- Born: June 17, 1969 (age 57) Trelleborg, Sweden
- Height: 6 ft 2 in (188 cm)
- Weight: 196 lb (89 kg; 14 st 0 lb)
- Position: Left wing
- Shot: Left
- Played for: AIK; Montreal Canadiens; HV71; Djurgårdens IF; Nashville Predators; Mighty Ducks of Anaheim
- National team: Sweden
- NHL draft: 83rd overall, 1988; Montreal Canadiens
- Playing career: 1988–2003

Patric Göran Kjellberg (born June 17, 1969) is a Swedish former professional ice hockey left wing. He was drafted in the fourth round, 83rd overall, by the Montreal Canadiens in the 1988 NHL entry draft.

== Career ==
Drafted from the Swedish Elite League's AIK, Kjellberg made his North American professional debut during the 1992–93 season with Montreal's AHL affiliate, the Fredericton Canadiens. He also made his NHL debut that same season with Montreal, appearing in seven games. After the season, however, Kjellberg returned to Sweden and played five more seasons in Elitserien. With HV71, he won the Swedish National Championship during the season of 1994–1995.

Kjellberg returned to the NHL in the 1998–99 season to play with the Nashville Predators. He was traded during the 2001–02 season to the Mighty Ducks of Anaheim in exchange for Petr Tenkrat.

In his NHL career, Kjellberg appeared in 394 games. He scored 64 goals and added 96 assists. He also appeared in ten Stanley Cup playoff games with Anaheim during the 2003 playoffs, going scoreless.

After his playing career, Kjellberg has worked for Leksands IF as sports manager.

== Career statistics ==
=== Regular season and playoffs ===
			Regular season					Playoffs
Season	Team	League	GP	G	A	Pts	PIM	GP	G	A	Pts	PIM
1985–86	Falu IF	SWE.2	5	0	2	2	0	—	—	—	—	—
1986–87	Falu IF	SWE.2	32	11	13	24	16	—	—	—	—	—
1987–88	Falu IF	SWE.2	29	15	10	25	6	—	—	—	—	—
1988–89	AIK	SEL	25	7	8	15	8	2	1	0	1	2
1989–90	AIK	SEL	32	8	15	23	6	3	1	0	1	0
1990–91	AIK	SEL	38	4	11	15	18	—	—	—	—	—
1991–92	AIK	SEL	40	20	13	33	14	3	1	0	1	2
1992–93	Montreal Canadiens	NHL	7	0	0	0	2	—	—	—	—	—
1992–93	Fredericton Canadiens	AHL	41	10	27	37	14	5	2	2	4	0
1993–94	HV71	SEL	40	11	17	28	18	—	—	—	—	—
1994–95	HV71	SEL	29	5	15	20	12	—	—	—	—	—
1995–96	Djurgårdens IF	SEL	40	9	7	16	10	4	0	2	2	2
1996–97	Djurgårdens IF	SEL	49	29	11	40	18	4	2	3	5	4
1997–98	Djurgårdens IF	SEL	46	30	18	48	16	15	7	3	10	12
1998–99	Nashville Predators	NHL	71	11	20	31	24	—	—	—	—	—
1999–2000	Nashville Predators	NHL	82	23	23	46	14	—	—	—	—	—
2000–01	Nashville Predators	NHL	81	14	31	45	12	—	—	—	—	—
2001–02	Nashville Predators	NHL	12	1	3	4	6	—	—	—	—	—
2001–02	Mighty Ducks of Anaheim	NHL	65	7	8	15	10	—	—	—	—	—
2002–03	Mighty Ducks of Anaheim	NHL	76	8	11	19	16	10	0	0	0	0
2011–12	Falu IF	SWE.3	3	0	2	2	0	—	—	—	—	—
SEL totals			339	123	115	238	120	31	12	8	20	20
NHL totals			394	64	96	160	84	10	0	0	0	0

=== International ===
Year	Team	Event	GP	G	A	Pts	PIM
1987	Sweden	EJC	7	8	3	11	2
1989	Sweden	WJC	7	3	4	7	4
1992	Sweden	OLY	8	1	3	4	0
1992	Sweden	WC	8	2	2	4	2
1994	Sweden	OLY	8	0	1	1	2
1998	Sweden	OLY	4	1	0	1	0
1998	Sweden	WC	10	2	4	6	0
Junior totals			14	11	7	18	6
Senior totals			38	6	10	16	4
