= Fredrik Näslund =

Swedish ice hockey player

- Born: February 11, 1986 (age 40) Bromma, Sweden
- Height: 6 ft 4 in (193 cm)
- Weight: 229 lb (104 kg; 16 st 5 lb)
- Position: Left wing
- Shot: Right
- Div.1C team Former teams: Falu IF; VIK Västerås HK; Nyköping
- NHL draft: 104th overall, 2004; Dallas Stars
- Playing career: 2003–2014

Fredrik Näslund (born February 11, 1986, in Bromma, Sweden) is a Swedish ice hockey player who plays for the Falu IF in Div.1C.

Näslund, who now lives in Falun, was a member of the Västerås Juniors in his home country of Sweden for three years. He was drafted in the 4th round (104th overall) of the 2004 NHL entry draft to the Dallas Stars. Jeff Twohey, the general manager of the Peterborough Petes of the OHL, saw great potential in Näslund as a player. He had the 6'4", 210-pound Swedish winger drafted in the first round of the 2005 CHL Import Draft.

Näslund's acclimatization to the North American style of hockey helped the Peterborough Petes in their obtainment of the Ontario Hockey League championship in 2006, in the team's 50th anniversary. He played on a line with Philadelphia Flyers prospect Steve Downie and with OHL superstar Jordan Staal. The big European rookie was one of two imports on the Petes that season, along with Czech Republic native Lubomír Štach, a defenceman who was traded to the Petes from the Guelph Storm.

Other than Oshawa Generals free agent Nathaniel Brooks (who was signed out of Tier II) and Justin Sawyer (who could not qualify due to playing ten games during the 2004/2005 season), Näslund was the oldest rookie in the OHL last year.

He returned to Sweden the next season.

== Career statistics ==
=== Regular season and playoffs ===
			Regular season					Playoffs
Season	Team	League	GP	G	A	Pts	PIM	GP	G	A	Pts	PIM
2002–03	Västerås IK Ungdom	J18 Allsv	3	3	2	5	2	—	—	—	—	—
2002–03	Västerås IK Ungdom	J20	28	6	7	13	6	—	—	—	—	—
2003–04	Västerås IK Ungdom	J18 Allsv	14	12	15	27	6	3	0	1	1	4
2003–04	Västerås IK Ungdom	SWE.2 U20	—	—	—	—	—	3	1	0	1	0
2003–04	Västerås IK Ungdom	Allsv	32	2	4	6	0	—	—	—	—	—
2004–05	Västerås IK Ungdom	J20	21	7	7	14	2	—	—	—	—	—
2004–05	Västerås IK Ungdom	Allsv	3	0	0	0	0	—	—	—	—	—
2005–06	Peterborough Petes	OHL	66	9	21	30	30	19	6	5	11	6
2006–07	IK Nyköpings Hockey	Allsv	45	13	13	26	38	5	2	2	4	4
2007–08	Nybro Vikings	Allsv	33	7	12	19	14	—	—	—	—	—
2008–09	Nybro Vikings	Allsv	40	2	9	11	34	—	—	—	—	—
2009–10	Nybro Vikings	SWE.3	40	26	25	51	28	10	0	6	6	4
2010–11	Nybro Vikings	SWE.3	41	16	16	32	20	5	0	1	1	0
2011–12	Falu IF	SWE.3	30	15	28	43	20	—	—	—	—	—
2012–13	Falu IF	SWE.3	32	39	25	64	12	—	—	—	—	—
2013–14	Falu IF	SWE.3	35	38	34	72	38	—	—	—	—	—
2019–20	Falu IF	SWE.4	2	1	1	2	0	—	—	—	—	—
Allsv totals			143	24	38	62	86	5	2	2	4	4
SWE.3 totals			178	134	128	262	118	15	0	7	7	4

=== International ===
Year	Team	Event	GP	G	A	Pts	PIM
2004	Sweden	WJC18	6	0	1	1	4
Junior totals			6	0	1	1	4
