= Johan Sellerstrand =

Swedish ice hockey player

- Born: March 30, 1994 (age 31) Sweden
- Height: 6 ft 2 in (188 cm)
- Weight: 228 lb (103 kg; 16 st 4 lb)
- Position: Right wing
- Shoots: Left
- SHL team: AIK IF
- NHL draft: Undrafted
- Playing career: 2009–present

Johan Sellerstrand (born March 30, 1994) is a Swedish ice hockey player. Known for his on-ice vision and physical play, Sellerstrand is considered a very competitive team player with a great physique. During the years 2012-2015 he played with AIK IF, in both J20 Superelit, Allsvenskan and the Swedish Hockey League (SHL). He is currently playing with Väsby IK of the Division 1 (Div. 1).

Sellerstrand made his Swedish Hockey League debut playing with AIK IF during the 2013–14 SHL season. Elitserien, the highest-level professional ice hockey league in Sweden, and scored a goal in one of his six games in Allsvenskan.
