= Kvalserien (disambiguation) =

Kvalserien is the name of round-robin tournaments to qualify for play in ice hockey leagues in Sweden. It may refer to:

- Kvalserien for SHL, the top-tier league. Ceased in 2014, replaced by a playoff round.
- Kvalserien for HockeyAllsvenskan, the second-tier league.
- Kvalserien for Hockeyettan, the third-tier league.
