= Kramfors-Alliansen =

- City: Kramfors, Sweden
- League: Swedish Division 2
- Founded: 1904
- Home arena: Latbergshallen

Kramfors-Alliansen is a sports club in Kramfors, Sweden. The ice hockey section currently participates in the Swedish Division 2, the fourth-level of ice hockey in Sweden. They have previously participated in the Swedish Division 1, both when it was the second and third-level Swedish league.

The club was known as "Kramfors IF" until 1971, when Kramfors IF and Östby IF merged to form Kramfors-Alliansen.
