= Nittorps IK =

- City: Nittorp, Sweden
- League: (Sweden) Division 1
- Division: 1F
- Home arena: Nittorps Ishall
- Colors: Red, white, black
- Website: www.nittorpsik.o.se

Nittorps IK is a Swedish sports club based in Nittorp and active in multiple sports including ice hockey. The ice hockey team plays in Division 1, the third tier of ice hockey in Sweden, as of the 2013–14 season. They were promoted from Division 2 in 2012 to fill the vacancy left in Division 1F due to the promotion of Karlskrona HK to HockeyAllsvenskan.

== Season-by-season (ice hockey) ==
Year	Level	Division	Record		Notes
Year	Level	Division	Position	W-T-L W-OT-L	Notes
2008–09	Tier 4	Division 2	1st	16–4–7	
2009–10	Tier 4	Division 2	1st	22–7–7	
2010–11	Tier 4	Division 2	4th	18–4–2–9	
2011–12	Tier 4	Division 2	3rd	18–1–2–9	
2011–12	Division 1 qualifier		3rd	4–0–0–4	▲ Promoted to Division 1
2012–13	Tier 3	Division 1F	9th	12–1–1–16	
2012–13	Tier 3	Division 1F continuation	7th	0–0–2–10	
2012–13	Division 1 qualifier		2nd	7–1–0–2	
2013–14	Tier 3	Division 1F	TBD	TBD	
