= Njurunda SK =

- City: Njurunda, Sweden
- League: Swedish Division 2
- Founded: 1971
- Home arena: Njurunda ishall

Njurunda SK is an ice hockey team in Njurunda, Sweden. They play in the Swedish Division 2, the fourth level of ice hockey in Sweden. Their home arena is the Njurunda ishall, which opened in 1986. Henrik Zetterberg used to play for the club's youth team.

Njurunda had previously played in the third-level Division 1, but elected to drop out of the league during the 2012-13 season, following the conclusion of the Division 1B continuation series.
