= Lindlövens IF =

- City: Lindesberg, Sweden
- League: Division 1
- Division: 1C
- Founded: 1976
- Home arena: Lindehov
- Colors: Blue, orange
- Head coach: (Sweden) Jussi Salo
- Website: www.lindloven.com

Lindlövens IF is a Swedish hockey team located in the town of Lindesberg. The team was founded in 1976 and since 2005 has played in HockeyEttan, the third level of Swedish ice hockey, where they are currently situated in group West
