= Järfälla HC =

Järfälla Hockey Club, often known by its initials JHC, is an ice hockey club based in Järfälla, Stockholm, Sweden. It was founded in 1976 when the clubs Jakobsbergs GoIF and IK Bele assembled their senior and junior sections. The club is one of the biggest in Stockholm with over 350 players. Järfälla HC plays their home games at Järfälla Ishall.

Internationally, it is most famous for being the parent club of Niklas Kronwall, Staffan Kronwall, Mikael Tellqvist and Marcus Nilson who all have played in the National Hockey League (NHL).
