= IFK Lidingö =

Sports club in Lidingö, Sweden

- Full name: Idrottsföreningen kamraterna Lidingö
- Sport: alpine skiing, association football, cross-country skiing, badminton, orienteering, speed skating, swimming, table tennis, track and field athletics earlier also ice hockey
- Founded: 1932
- Based in: Lidingö, Sweden
- Stadium: Lidingövallen

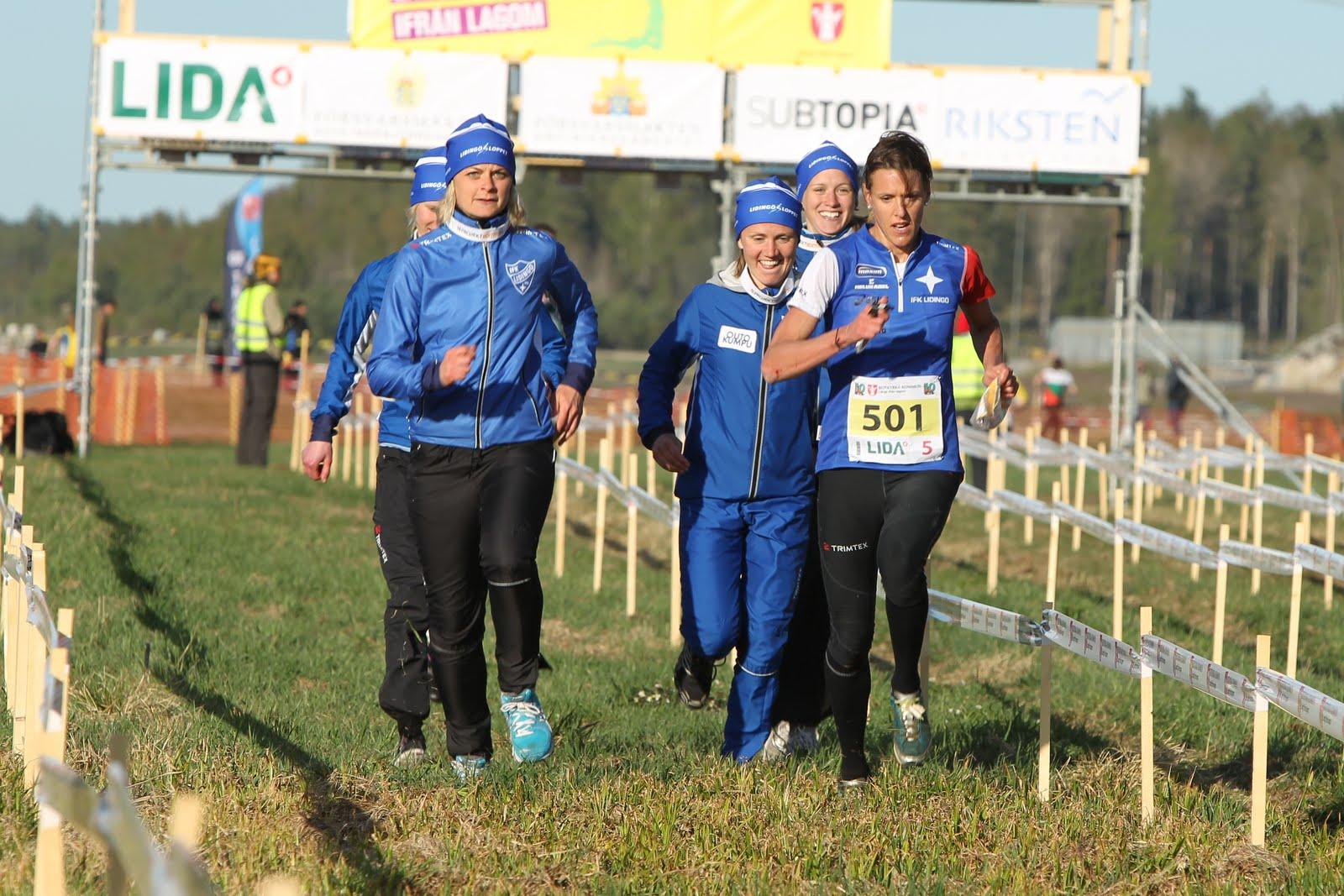
Tiomila 2011. Lidingö SOK

IFK Lidingö is a Swedish sports club, part of the IFK system, based on the island of Lidingö outside Stockholm. Although the club takes part in numerous sports, it is most famous for its football, athletics and orienteering sections. The football team are called IFK Lidingö FK.

The club was founded in 1932 and in 1985 it became an alliance club with independent sections. It currently has 400 members, most of them under around 15 years of age. The club arranges Lidingöloppet, which attracts nationwide attention.

== Athletics ==
Most notable among former athletes at the club is Ludmila Engquist and Mattias Sunneborn.

== Football ==
Famous former football players include Mikael Dorsin and Magnus Pehrsson.

== Orienteering ==
The club won the 10-mila relay in 1951, the women's relay in 10-mila in 2010 and 25-manna in 1999. The runners became world champions: Lucie Böhm (1997) and Graham Gristwood (2008). Other runners are: Marthe Andersson, Annika Billstam, Mårten Boström, Holger Hott, Fredrik Bakkman, Signe Søes and Chris Terkelsen.
