= Östersunds IK =

- City: Östersund, Sweden
- League: HockeyAllsvenskan
- Founded: 1965
- Home arena: Östersund Arena
- Colors: Green, yellow
- General manager: Tommy Wahlund
- Head coach: Kjell-Åke Andersson
- Captain: Linus Rotbakken
- Website: ostersundik.com

Franchise history
- 1965–2003: Östersunds IK
- 2003–2006: Jämtland Hockey
- 2006–present: Östersunds IK

Östersunds IK is a Swedish professional ice hockey club from Östersund. The club was founded in 1965 and has played 21 seasons in Sweden's second-tier hockey league. In 2003, the club transferred its A-team to Jämtland Hockey and played three years under that name while Östersunds IK was left with only its youth hockey programs. Then in 2006, Östersunds IK merged with Brunflo IK and took over Jämtland Hockey's position in Division 1.

On 29 April 2022, the club was promoted to the HockeyAllsvenskan, the current second tier of Swedish ice hockey, for the first time, after winning the Hockeyettan playoffs. They would make their Allsvenskan debut in the 2022–23 season.
