= Örebro IK =

- City: Örebro, Sweden
- League: Division 1 at time of bankruptcy. Previously Elitserien and Allsvenskan.
- Founded: 1972
- Operated: 1972–1999

Franchise history
- Years in highest league: 9
- Years in the SHL: 2

Championships
- Le Mat Trophy: 0

Örebro IK was an ice hockey team from Örebro, Sweden that was founded in 1972. The team filed for bankruptcy and was liquidated in 1999, after many years of playing elite-level hockey. Today, Örebro is represented in Sweden's upper-tier hockey leagues by Örebro HK.
