= Sollefteå HK =

Swedish ice hockey clup

- City: Sollefteå, Sweden
- League: (Sweden) Division 1
- Division: Norra
- Founded: 1977
- Home arena: Niphallen
- Colors: Green, yellow, white

Franchise history
- –1977: Sollefteå IK; Långsele AIF
- 1977–1985: IK Polar
- 1985–present: Sollefteå HK

Sollefteå HK, also sometimes referred to as Sollefteå Hockey, is a Swedish ice hockey club which, as of the 2013–14 season, plays in Division 1, the third tier of ice hockey in Sweden. The team's most successful era came in the 1980s when they played in Sweden's second-tier league.
