= Vallentuna BK =

Swedish football club

- Full name: Vallentuna Bollklubb
- Nickname: VBK
- Founded: 1919
- Ground: Vallentuna IP; Vallentuna; Sweden
- Capacity: 2,000
- Chairman: Jonny Ullgren
- Head coach: Stefan Karlsson
- Coach: Daniel Lundkvist
- League: Division 4 Stockholm Norra
- 2011: Division 3 Norra Svealand, 11th
Home colours	Away colours

Vallentuna BK is a Swedish football club located in Vallentuna.

== Background ==
Since their foundation in 1919 Vallentuna Bollklubb has participated mainly in the lower divisions of the Swedish football league system. The club currently plays in Division 3 Norra Svealand which is the fifth tier of Swedish football. They play their home matches at the Vallentuna IP in Vallentuna.

The club is affiliated to the Stockholms Fotbollförbund.

== Season to season ==
Season	Level	Division	Section	Position	Movements
1993	Tier 4	Division 3	Norra Svealand	4th	
1994	Tier 4	Division 3	Norra Svealand	4th	
1995	Tier 4	Division 3	Norra Svealand	1st	Promoted
1996	Tier 3	Division 2	Östra Svealand	3rd	
1997	Tier 3	Division 2	Östra Svealand	7th	
1998	Tier 3	Division 2	Östra Svealand	9th	
1999	Tier 3	Division 2	Östra Svealand	4th	
2000	Tier 3	Division 2	Östra Svealand	10th	Relegation Playoffs
2001	Tier 3	Division 2	Östra Svealand	5th	
2002	Tier 3	Division 2	Västra Svealand	8th	
2003	Tier 3	Division 2	Östra Svealand	8th	
2004	Tier 3	Division 2	Östra Svealand	11th	Relegated
2005	Tier 4	Division 3	Norra Svealand	4th	Promotion Playoffs – Promoted
2006*	Tier 4	Division 2	Norra Svealand	6th	
2007	Tier 4	Division 2	Norra Svealand	8th	
2008	Tier 4	Division 2	Norra Svealand	4th	
2009	Tier 4	Division 2	Norra Svealand	8th	
2010	Tier 4	Division 2	Södra Svealand	12th	Relegated
2011	Tier 5	Division 3	Norra Svealand	11th	Relegated

* League restructuring in 2006 resulted in a new division being created at Tier 3 and subsequent divisions dropping a level.
