= Nacka HK =

Nacka HK Nacka Hockeyklubb
- City: Nacka, Sweden
- League: Division 1
- Division: Group D
- Founded: 1976 (1906)
- Home arena: Nacka ishall
- Colors: Blue, white, black
- Website: nackahockey.se

Franchise history
- 1906–1976: Nacka SK
- ?–1976: Atlas Copco IF
- ?–1976: Skuru IK
- 1976–1981: NSA-76
- 1981–present: Nacka HK

Nacka HK, officially Nacka Hockeyklubb (English: Nacka Hockey Club), is a Swedish ice hockey club based in the Stockholm suburb of Nacka. As of the 2013–14 season, Nacka plays in group D of Division 1, the third tier of ice hockey in Sweden.

The club traces its roots to Nacka SK, a sports club founded in 1906 that initially competed in bandy. Nacka SK's hockey department played 23 seasons in Sweden's top-tier league, most recently the 1971–72 season. However, they never won a Swedish championship. Following their failure to achieve promotion to Elitserien (now the SHL) in the 1976 qualifiers, Nacka SK merged with Atlas Copco IF and Skuru IK to form NSA-76. The new club renamed itself Nacka HK in 1980.

Mats Sundin, Marcus Ragnarsson, Johan Garpenlöv, Fredrik Lindquist and Leif Svensson are well known players who have played hockey for Nacka HK or its predecessors.

== Women's ice hockey ==
The club won the Swedish championship in 1988, 1989, 1990, 1991, 1992, 1993, 1994, 1996 and 1998. Following the 1997–1998 season, the women's team was disbanded as the players meant the support they got from their club wasn't enough.

In 1985, 1986 and 1987 the club also won the Swedish realm championship for women.

== Season-by-season ==
This is an incomplete list, featuring only recent Nacka SK seasons.

| Year | Level | Division | Record | | Avg. home atnd. | Notes |
| Year | Level | Division | Position | W-T-L W-OT-L | Avg. home atnd. | Notes |
|---|---|---|---|---|---|---|
| 2008–09 | Tier 3 | Division 1D | 6th | 9–3–4–11 | | |
| 2008–09 | Tier 3 | Division 1D continuation | 2nd | 6–0–1–3 | | |
| 2009–10 | Tier 3 | Division 1D | 8th | 10–1–1–10 | | |
| 2009–10 | Tier 3 | Division 1D continuation | 5th | 6–1–1–6 | | |
| 2009–10 | Division 1 qualifier | | 1st | 6–1–2–1 | | |
| 2010–11 | Tier 3 | Division 1D | 4th | 15–1–2–9 | | |
| 2010–11 | Tier 3 | Allettan Mellan | 6th | 4–0–1–9 | | |
| 2011–12 | Tier 3 | Division 1D | 9th | 6–2–3–16 | | |
| 2011–12 | Tier 3 | Division 1D continuation | 2nd | 9–0–1–5 | | |
| 2012–13 | Tier 3 | Division 1D | 10th | 5–2–1–19 | | |
| 2012–13 | Tier 3 | Division 1D continuation | 6th | 4–0–1–10 | | |
| 2012–13 | Division 1 qualifier D | | 2nd | 4–0–0–2 | | |
| 2013–14 | Tier 3 | Division 1D | 10th | 1–0–3–23 | 118 | |
| 2013–14 | Tier 3 | Division 1D continuation | 5th | 2–3–1–9 | 82 | |
| 2013–14 | Division 1 qualifier D | | 4th | 2-1-5 | | |
| 2014–15 | Tier 3 | Division 1D | | | | |
| 2014–15 | Tier 3 | Division 1D continuation | | | | |
| 2014–15 | Division 1 qualifier D | | | | | |
