= Falu IF =

Swedish ice hockey club

Falu IF Falu Ishockeyförening
- City: Falun, Sweden
- League: Hockeyettan
- Founded: 1997
- Home arena: Lugnets Ishall
- Colors: Red, blue, white
- Head coach: (Sweden) Christer Elfsberg
- Asst. coach: (Sweden) Conny Elfsberg
- Website: faluif.se

Falu Ishockeyförening (literally Falu Ice Hockey Association) or Falu IF is an ice hockey club located in the Swedish city of Falun in Dalarna. The club currently plays in the Western group of Hockeyettan, the third tier of the Swedish ice hockey system, and plays their matches in Lugnets Ishall with a capacity for 2500 spectators.

The most successful season during this period was 1983/1984 when they reached Allsvenskan, which at that time was a playoff series for Division I. Falu IF's junior team has played in J18 Region and J20 Region during most seasons in the 2010s. The club also has a women's team that competes in the Nationella Damhockeyligan, where they have been very successful. The association's home arena is Lugnets Ishall, located at Lugnet in Falun.

After the completion of the 2022/2023 season, Falu IF was offered a spot in Hockeyettan, following the bankruptcy of HC Vita Hästen. Falu IF was offered the spot as the highest-ranked second-place team in the qualifying series. This means that in the 2023/2024 season, they will be playing in Hockeyettan Västra.

== Recent seasons ==
List of recent Falu IF seasons
Year	Level	League	Record		Avg home atnd.	Notes	Ref.
Year	Level	League	Position	W–T–L W–OT–L	Avg home atnd.	Notes	Ref.
2004–05	Tier 3	Division 1C	9th	9–2–19			
2005–06	Tier 3	Division 1C	6th	15–7–14			
2006–07	Tier 3	Division 1C	10th	5–7–24			
2006–07	Tier 3	Division 1C spring series	7th	0–0–6			
2006–07	2007 Division 1 qualifier (Group C)		1st	3–1–2			
2007–08	Tier 3	Division 1C	8th	9–2–16			
2007–08	Tier 3	Division 1C continuation	5th	3–4–3			
2007–08	Division 1 qualifier (Group C)		3rd	3–2–3		▼ Relegated to Division 2	
2008–09	Tier 4	Division 2	?	?			
2009–10	Tier 4	Division 2	?	?			
2009–10	Division 1 qualifier (Group C)		2nd	3–3–2		▲ Promoted to Division 1	
2010–11	Tier 3	Division 1C	10th	3–4–20	184		
2010–11	Tier 3	Division 1C continuation	5th	5–1–4	223		
2010–11	Division 1 qualifier (Group C)		1st	6–0–2	213		
2011–12	Tier 3	Division 1C	3rd	14–6–7	486		
2011–12	Tier 3	Allettan Mellan	6th	3–4–7	410		
2012–13	Tier 3	Division 1C	1st	18–3–6	466		
2012–13	Tier 3	Allettan Mellan	7th	2–1–11	285		
2013–14	Tier 3	Division 1C	8th	10–0–3–14	288		
2013–14	Tier 3	Division 1C continuation	4th	8–1–2–4	149		
2013–14	Division 1 qualifier C		1st	7–1–0–0	202	▼ Relegated to Division 2	
2014-2022	Tier 4	Division 2	?	?			
2022-2023	Tier 4	Division 2	1st	21-3-4			
2022-2023	Hockeyettan qualifier (West)		2nd	4–0–2	535	▲ Promoted to Division 1	
2023-2024	Tier 3	Hockeyettan (West)					
