= Väsby IK HK =

Väsby IK Hockey
- City: Upplands Väsby, Sweden
- League: Hockeyettan
- Division: East
- Founded: 1956
- Home arena: Renew Arena
- Colors: White, green, red
- Head coach: Niklas Flodin, André Smulter
- Affiliate: AIK IF
- Website: www.svenskalag.se/vasbyhockey

Championships
- Division titles: all-ettan winners 2020

Väsby IK HK is an ice hockey club based in Upplands Väsby, Sweden. Since the 2021–22 season the club is back in the third tier, Hockeyettan, having been relegated from HockeyAllsvenskan after losing to Kristianstads IK in the 2020–21 Play Out series, ending a one-year stint in HockeyAllsvenskan.

At the end of the 1986–87 season, Väsby achieved one of the greatest upsets in the history of Swedish hockey by achieving promotion to the top division of Swedish ice hockey. The team's time in the top league would be short however, as the team finished last in the first round of the following year's Elitserien season and were sent down to the Allsvenskan spring series after Christmas, where they failed to re-qualify for the following Elitserien season and were ultimately relegated to the second tier league. They were granted promotion to the second-tier league HockeyAllsvenskan for the 2020–21 season, after Karlskrona HK was relegated due to that club's financial struggles.

== Season-by-season ==
Season	Level	Division	Record		Avg. home atnd.	Notes	Ref.
Season	Level	Division	Position	W-T-L W-OT-L	Avg. home atnd.	Notes	Ref.
2009–10	Tier 3	Division 1D	6th	10–1–2–9	308		
2009–10	Tier 3	Division 1D (spring)	2nd	8–1–2–3	229		
2010–11	Tier 3	Division 1D	8th	8–1–2–16	221		
2010–11	Tier 3	Division 1D continuation	6th	1–0–0–9	244		
2010–11	Division 1 qualifier (Group D)		5th	1–1–1–5	190	▼ Relegated to Division 2	
2011–12	Tier 4	Division 2 North (East regional)	2nd	9–0–0–5	233		
2011–12	Tier 4	Alltvåan (East regional)	2nd	14–1–0–6	292		
2011–12	Division 1 qualifier (Group D)		2nd	3–1–1–1	395	▲ Promoted to Division 1	
2012–13	Tier 3	Division 1D	5th	11–2–1–13	226		
2012–13	Tier 3	Division 1D continuation	2nd	9–1–1–4	194		
2013–14	Tier 3	Division 1D	6th	10–1–1–15	268		
2013–14	Tier 3	Division 1D continuation	2nd	7–3–3–2	210		
2014–15	Tier 3	Hockeyettan East	6th of 12	10–1–2–9	243		
2014–15	Tier 3	Hockeyettan East continuation	6th of 8	5–0–1–8	236		
2015–16	Tier 3	Hockeyettan East	9th of 12	6–2–3–11	262		
2015–16	Tier 3	Hockeyettan East continuation	4th of 8	6–2–0–6	227		
2016–17	Tier 3	Hockeyettan East	4th of 12	14–1–0–7	304		
2016–17	Tier 3	Allettan East	4th of 10	9–0–4–5	414		
2016–17	Tier 3	Playoffs	—	3–0–1–1	810	Round 1: Won 2–0 in games vs Tranås; Round 2: Lost 1–2 in games vs Piteå	
