= Kiruna IF =

- City: Kiruna, Sweden
- League: (Sweden) Hockeyettan as of the 2014–15 season
- Division: Norra
- Founded: 1988
- Home arena: Lombiahallen
- Colors: Red, white

Franchise history
- 1988–2007: Team Kiruna IF
- 2007–present: Kiruna IF

Kiruna IF is an ice hockey club based in Kiruna, Sweden. As of the 2014–15 season, they will play in Hockeyettan (formerly named Division 1), the third level of ice hockey in Sweden. Their home arena is the Lombiahallen.

The club was founded in 1988 as Team Kiruna IF, a merger of the hockey departments of Kiruna AIF and IFK Kiruna. They made their debut playing in Division 1 when it was the second tier of Swedish hockey. Following the 2002–03 season, the club voluntarily withdrew from the second-tier league Allsvenskan due to financial problems. They have competed in the third-level league Hockeyettan (formerly named Division 1) since the 2003–04 season.

In June 2014, Kiruna IF announced that they would play the 2014–15 season with rainbow-coloured match jerseys to support the LGBT community, becoming the first LGBT-certified sports club in Sweden.
