= Grums IK =

Sports club in Grums, Sweden

Grums IK is a Swedish sports club based in the town of Grums, founded in 1920. The ice hockey club, Grums IK Hockey, currently competes in Division 2, the fourth tier league in ice hockey in Sweden. The football club, Grums IK Fotboll, currently plays in Division 3, the fifth tier league in football in Sweden.
