= 2013 Kvalserien =

Swedish ice hockey tournament

The 2013 Kvalserien was the 39th Kvalserien, consisting of two Elitserien (SHL) teams and four HockeyAllsvenskan teams. It began on 14 March 2013 and ended on 5 April 2013. The 2013 Kvalserien determined which two teams of the participating ones would play in the 2013–14 SHL season and which four teams would play in the 2013–14 HockeyAllsvenskan season.

For the first time since 2006, neither of the two Elitserien teams – Timrå IK and Rögle BK – managed to defend their spot in the top-tier league. Instead, HockeyAllsvenskan teams Örebro HK and Leksands IF took the two available spots for the 2013–14 SHL season. Örebro went undefeated in regulation time throughout the ten games and secured promotion in the seventh round (of ten), while Leksand secured their SHL spot in the following round. Örebro promoted to the SHL for the first time in club history (another Örebro team, Örebro IK, last played in the Elitserien in 1978–79), while Leksand returned to the SHL for the first time since the 2005–06 season. Timrå were relegated to HockeyAllsvenskan for the first time since 2000, while Rögle's return to Elitserien lasted for only one season.

== Participating teams ==
Team	City	Arena	Capacity
Leksands IF	Leksand	Tegera Arena	7,650
Rögle BK	Ängelholm	Lindab Arena	5,150
Södertälje SK	Södertälje	AXA Sports Center	6,130
Timrå IK	Timrå	E.ON Arena	6,000
Västerås HK	Västerås	ABB Arena Nord	5,800
Örebro HK	Örebro	Behrn Arena	5,150

From Elitserien (ranked 11–12)

- Timrå IK
- Rögle BK

From HockeyAllsvenskan (ranked 1–3)

- Leksands IF
- Södertälje SK
- VIK Västerås HK

From HockeyAllsvenskan playoff round

- Örebro HK

== Standings ==
2013 Kvalserien		GP	W	T	L	OTW/SOW	OTL/SOL	GF	GA	DIF	PTS
1	Örebro HK	10	6	4	0	2	2	29	16	+13	24
2	Leksands IF	10	7	1	2	0	1	36	19	+17	22
3	Timrå IK	10	4	3	3	2	1	30	30	0	17
4	VIK Västerås HK	10	3	2	5	1	1	19	23	–4	12
5	Rögle BK	10	2	1	7	1	0	18	27	–9	8
6	Södertälje SK	10	2	1	7	0	1	16	33	–17	7

Legend: Qualified for the 2013–14 SHL season; Play in the 2013–14 HockeyAllsvenskan season

== Game log ==
2013 Kvalserien game log
March

Round	Date	Home	Result	Away	Venue	Attendance
1	March 14	Timrå IK	3–2 SO	Örebro HK	E.ON Arena	4,377
1	March 14	Rögle BK	2–3	VIK Västerås HK	Lindab Arena	3,752
1	March 14	Leksands IF	3–1	Södertälje SK	Tegera Arena	6,772
2	March 16	Södertälje SK	1–4	Rögle BK	AXA Sports Center	4,582
2	March 16	VIK Västerås HK	2–1 SO	Timrå IK	ABB Arena Nord	4,902
2	March 16	Örebro HK	5–2	Leksands IF	Behrn Arena	5,065
3	March 19	Timrå IK	4–1	Södertälje SK	E.ON Arena	4,266
3	March 19	Rögle BK	0–4	Leksands IF	Lindab Arena	4,651
3	March 19	VIK Västerås HK	0–1	Örebro HK	ABB Arena Nord	4,590
4	March 21	Leksands IF	6–2	Timrå IK	Tegera Arena	7,650
4	March 21	Södertälje SK	3–2	VIK Västerås HK	AXA Sports Center	3,538
4	March 21	Örebro HK	2–0	Rögle BK	Behrn Arena	4,172
5	March 23	Södertälje SK	2–3	Örebro HK	AXA Sports Center	4,255
5	March 23	VIK Västerås HK	1–3	Leksands IF	ABB Arena Nord	4,902
5	March 23	Timrå IK	3–5	Rögle BK	E.ON Arena	4,375
6	March 26	Rögle BK	0–1	Timrå IK	Lindab Arena	3,744
6	March 26	Leksands IF	4–1	VIK Västerås HK	Tegera Arena	7,650
6	March 26	Örebro HK	3–0	Södertälje SK	Behrn Arena	5,208
7	March 28	Timrå IK	3–8	Leksands IF	E.ON Arena	5,625
7	March 28	Rögle BK	2–5	Örebro HK	Lindab Arena	2,356
7	March 28	VIK Västerås HK	1–0	Södertälje SK	ABB Arena Nord	2,631
8	March 30	Leksands IF	3–1	Rögle BK	Tegera Arena	7,650
8	March 30	Södertälje SK	3–8	Timrå IK	AXA Sports Center	2,698
8	March 30	Örebro HK	5–4 SO	VIK Västerås HK	Behrn Arena	4,906

April

Round	Date	Home	Result	Away	Venue	Attendance
9	April 2	Timrå IK	3–2	VIK Västerås HK	E.ON Arena	2,736
9	April 2	Rögle BK	3–2 OT	Södertälje SK	Lindab Arena	2,188
9	April 2	Leksands IF	1–2 OT	Örebro HK	Tegera Arena	7,258
10	April 5	Södertälje SK	3–2	Leksands IF	AXA Sports Center	5,058
10	April 5	VIK Västerås HK	3–1	Rögle BK	ABB Arena Nord	2,564
10	April 5	Örebro HK	1–2 SO	Timrå IK	Behrn Arena	4,808

== Statistics ==
=== Scoring leaders ===
Updated as of the end of the season.
GP = Games played; G = Goals; A = Assists; Pts = Points; +/– = Plus/minus; PIM = Penalty minutes

Player	Team	GP	G	A	Pts	+/–	PIM
(Sweden) Marcus Weinstock	Örebro HK	10	4	9	13	+6	8
(Sweden) Jacob Blomqvist	Leksands IF	10	6	5	11	+6	4
(Sweden) Jens Bergenström	Leksands IF	10	6	5	11	+2	4
(Sweden) Conny Strömberg	Örebro HK	10	1	10	11	+4	2
(United States) Matt Murley	Timrå IK	10	4	6	10	+5	2
(Sweden) Johan Ryno	Leksands IF	10	1	9	10	+1	6
(Sweden) Pär Edblom	Leksands IF	10	1	9	10	+7	8
(Sweden) Filip Forsberg	Leksands IF	9	5	4	9	+7	6
(France) Damien Fleury	Södertälje SK	10	4	5	9	–3	10
(Sweden) Gabriel Karlsson	Leksands IF	9	3	4	7	+3	2

=== Leading goaltenders ===
These are the leaders in GAA among goaltenders who have played at least 40% of the team's minutes. Updated as of the end of the season.

GP = Games played; TOI = Time on ice (minutes); GA = Goals against; SO = Shutouts; Sv% = Save percentage; GAA = Goals against average

Player	Team	GP	TOI	GA	SO	Sv%	GAA
(Sweden) Tim Sandberg	Örebro HK	6	360:00	6	3	.957	1.00
(Sweden) Oscar Alsenfelt	Leksands IF	6	360:00	8	1	.951	1.33
(Sweden) Lars Johansson	VIK Västerås HK	10	602:19	21	1	.926	2.09
(Sweden) Erik Hanses	Leksands IF	4	242:55	11	0	.899	2.72
(Switzerland) Martin Gerber	Rögle BK	8	454:00	21	0	.908	2.78
