= List of Örebro HK seasons =

This is a list of seasons of Örebro-based Swedish ice hockey club Örebro HK, formerly named HC Örebro 90.

Season	Level	Division	Record		Avg. home atnd.	Notes
Season	Level	Division	Position	W-T-L W-OT-L W-OTW-OTL-L	Avg. home atnd.	Notes
2004–05	Tier 3	Division 1C	1st	24–2–4		
2004–05	2005 Allsvenskan qualifier		3rd	4–1–3	2,296	
Club renamed Örebro HK
2005–06	Tier 3	Division 1E	2nd	23–4–5	900	
2005–06	Tier 3	Playoff E/F	—	2–3	1,977	
2006–07	Tier 3	Division 1C	1st	32–2–2	517	
2006–07	Tier 3	Allettan South	2nd	4–0–2	1,344	
2006–07	Tier 3	Playoff to Allsvenskan qual.	—	0–2	1,566	0–2 in games vs Piteå HC (3–5, 1–2)
2007–08	Tier 3	Division 1E	1st	22–2–3	520	
2007–08	Tier 3	Allettan South	3rd	8–1–5	1,123	
2007–08	Tier 3	Playoff to Allsvenskan qual.	—	3–2	1,292	2–0 vs Tranås AIF, 1–2 vs Asplöven HC
2008–09	Tier 3	Division 1E	1st	21–3–3	505	
2008–09	Tier 3	Allettan South	2nd	8–4–2	1,241	Bye to final playoff round
2008–09	Tier 3	Playoff to Allsvenskan qual.	—	2–0	2,539	Won 2–0 in games vs Enköpings SK HK (4–1, 5–1)
2008–09	HockeyAllsvenskan qualifier		1st	6–3–1	2,613	▲ Promoted to HockeyAllsvenskan
2009–10	Tier 2	HockeyAllsvenskan	10th	13–16–23	1,549	
2010–11	Tier 2	HockeyAllsvenskan	3rd	26–12–14	2,163	
2010–11	2011 Elitserien qualifier		5th	2–2–6	2,849	
2011–12	Tier 2	HockeyAllsvenskan	1st	32–4–16	2,445	
2011–12	2012 Elitserien qualifier		5th	3–1–6	3,381	
2012–13	Tier 2	HockeyAllsvenskan	6th	26–7–19	3,618	
2012–13	Tier 2	Playoff to Elitserien qual.	1st	4–1–1	4,073	
2012–13	2013 Elitserien qualifier		1st	6–2–2–0	4,832	▲ Promoted to Elitserien (later renamed SHL)
2013–14	Tier 1	SHL	11th	13–5–12–25	5,027	
2014–15	Tier 1	SHL	6th	21–10–7–17	5,148	
2014–15	Swedish Championship playoffs			2–4		Lost in Quarterfinals, 2–4 vs Växjö Lakers
2015–16	Tier 1	SHL	8th	19–6–8–19	5,446	
2015–16	Tier 1	Playoff qualifier		0–2		Lost 0–2 vs HV71
2016–17	Tier 1	SHL	12th	11–7–6–28	5,317	
2017–18	Tier 1	SHL	12th	14–4–8–26	5,143	
2018–19	Tier 1	SHL	10th	16–7–7–22	5,178	
2018–19	Tier 1	Eighth-finals		0–2	5,416	Lost 0–2 vs Växjö Lakers
2019–20	Tier 1	SHL	8th	26–2–3–21	5,333	Playoffs were cancelled
2020–21	Tier 1	SHL	6th	25–4–4–19	33	
2020–21	Swedish Championship playoffs			6–3	0	Lost in Semifinals, 2–3 vs Växjö Lakers
2021–22	Tier 1	SHL	7th	20–8–5–19	4,377	
2021–22	Tier 1	Eighth-finals		2–1	5,014	Won 2–1 vs Brynäs IF
2021–22	Swedish Championship playoffs			1–4	5,257	Lost in quarterfinals, 1–4 vs Luleå HF
2022–23	Tier 1	SHL	4th	21–7–6–18	5,334	
2022–23	Swedish Championship playoffs			6–7	5,493	Lost in Semifinals, 2–4 vs Skellefteå AIK
2023–24	Tier 1	SHL	10th	14–9–7–22	5,392	
2023–24	Tier 1	Eighth-finals		1–2	5,500	Lost 1–2 vs Luleå HF
2024–25	Tier 1	SHL	9th	18–4–9–21	5,363	
2024–25	Tier 1	Eighth-finals		1–2	5,217	Lost 1–2 vs Växjö Lakers
