= Henrik Löwdahl =

Swedish ice hockey player

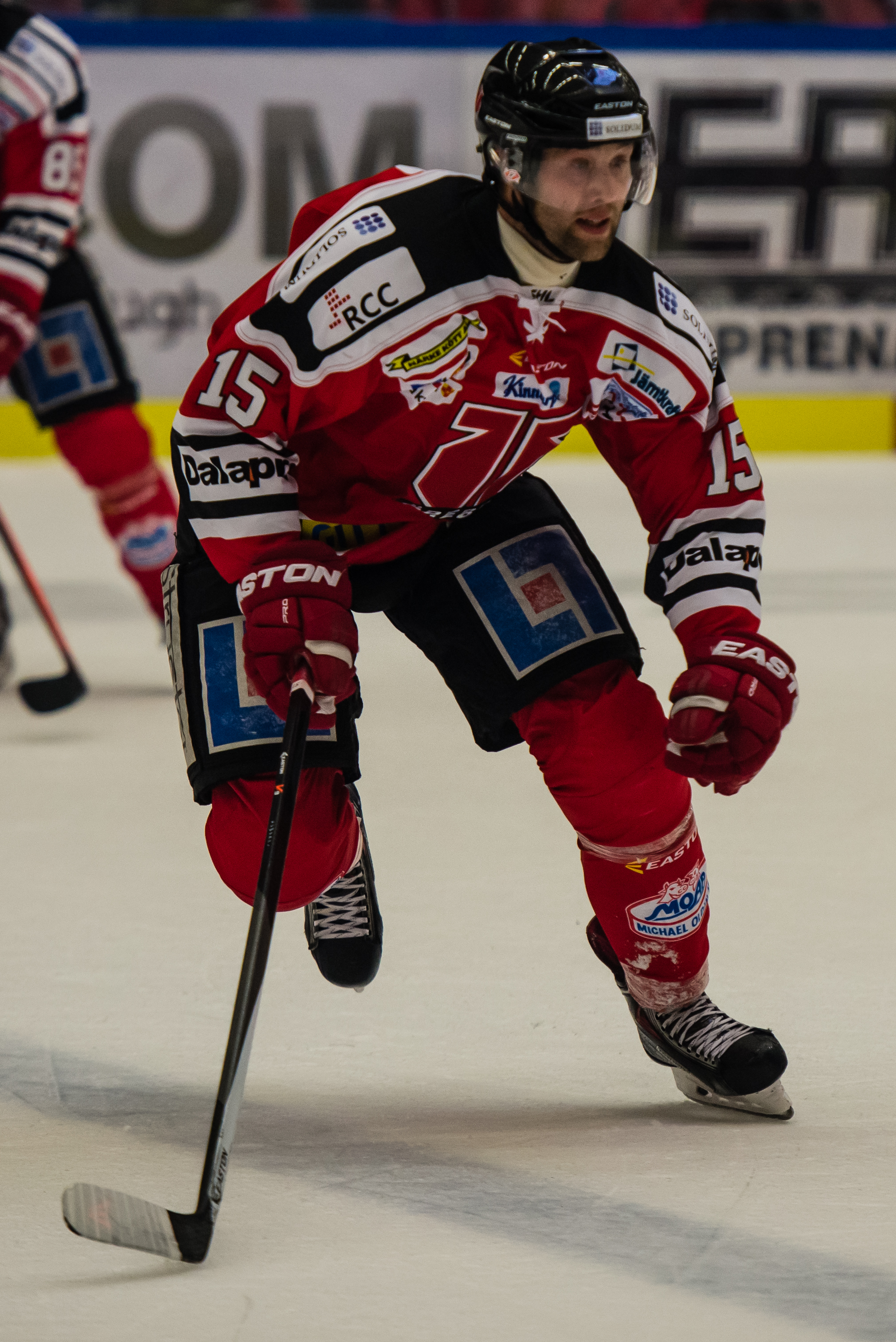
- Born: June 6, 1981 (age 44) Örebro, Sweden
- Height: 6 ft 3 in (191 cm)
- Weight: 196 lb (89 kg; 14 st 0 lb)
- Position: Centre
- Shot: Left
- Played for: Örebro HK
- NHL draft: Undrafted
- Playing career: 2001–2016

Henrik Löwdahl (born June 6, 1981) is a Swedish former ice hockey player. He last played with Örebro HK of the Swedish Hockey League (SHL).

Lowdahl made his Swedish Hockey League debut playing with Örebro HK during the 2013–14 SHL season.

== Career statistics ==
			Regular season					Playoffs
Season	Team	League	GP	G	A	Pts	PIM	GP	G	A	Pts	PIM
1998–99	Örebro IK	Division 1	18	0	2	2	4	—	—	—	—	—
1999–00	HC Örebro 90	Division 1	—	14	10	24	—	—	—	—	—	—
2000–01	HC Örebro 90	Division 1	30	15	16	31	16	9	5	6	11	2
2001–02	HC Örebro 90	Allsvenskan	46	14	16	30	22	—	—	—	—	—
2002–03	HC Örebro 90	Allsvenskan	41	5	11	16	14	—	—	—	—	—
2003–04	HC Örebro 90	Allsvenskan	44	13	11	24	16	—	—	—	—	—
2004–05	HC Örebro 90	Division 1	—	17	34	51	—	8	4	9	13	4
2005–06	Örebro HK	Division 1	16	12	23	35	16	5	3	1	4	2
2006–07	Örebro HK	Division 1	20	7	19	26	10	1	0	0	0	0
2007–08	Örebro HK	Division 1	37	18	44	62	22	5	3	5	8	10
2008–09	Örebro HK	Division 1	25	19	38	57	12	—	—	—	—	—
2009–10	Örebro HK	HockeyAllsvenskan	49	27	29	56	34	—	—	—	—	—
2010–11	Örebro HK	HockeyAllsvenskan	44	18	23	41	32	10	7	7	14	2
2011–12	Örebro HK	HockeyAllsvenskan	50	24	23	47	22	8	1	2	3	12
2012–13	Örebro HK	HockeyAllsvenskan	45	12	9	21	30	14	8	0	8	4
2013–14	Örebro HK	SHL	42	10	10	20	14	—	—	—	—	—
2014–15	Örebro HK	SHL	46	7	11	18	22	6	2	1	3	0
2015–16	Örebro HK	SHL	36	2	4	6	12	2	0	0	0	0
SHL totals			124	19	25	44	48	8	2	1	3	0
HockeyAllsvenskan totals			188	81	84	165	118	32	16	9	25	18
Allsvenskan totals			131	32	38	70	52	—	—	—	—	—
