= Rodrigo Ābols =

Latvian ice hockey player (born 1996)

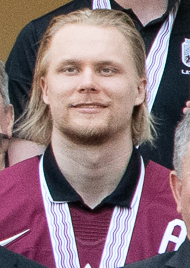
- Born: 5 January 1996 (age 30) Riga, Latvia
- Height: 6 ft 4 in (193 cm)
- Weight: 187 lb (85 kg; 13 st 5 lb)
- Position: Forward
- Shoots: Left
- NL team Former teams: SC Bern; Dinamo Riga; Örebro HK; Rögle BK; Philadelphia Flyers
- National team: Latvia
- NHL draft: 184th overall, 2016; Vancouver Canucks
- Playing career: 2014–present

Rodrigo Ābols (born 5 January 1996) is a Latvian professional ice hockey forward who plays for SC Bern of the Swiss National League. Ābols was selected in the seventh round, 184th overall, by the Vancouver Canucks in the 2016 NHL entry draft. He previously played in the National Hockey League (NHL) for the Philadelphia Flyers.

== Playing career ==
During the 2014–15 season, Ābols skated for both Dinamo Riga of the Kontinental Hockey League (KHL) and HK Rīga of the Minor Hockey League (MHL). He made his KHL debut on 27 December 2014 with Riga, whom his father, Artis Ābols, coached.

Ābols joined the Portland Winterhawks of the Western Hockey League (WHL) for the 2015–16 season. In 62 games, Ābols registered 20 goals and 49 points. During the 2016 NHL entry draft, Ābols was selected in the seventh round, 184th overall, by the Vancouver Canucks. Ābols split the 2016–17 season between the Winterhawks and the Acadie–Bathurst Titan of the Quebec Major Junior Hockey League.

Ābols skated for Örebro HK of the Swedish Hockey League (SHL) during the 2017–18 season. While on loan, he also played for BIK Karlskoga of HockeyAllsvenskan. With his rights expired from the Canucks, he continued his tenure with Örebro HK in the 2018–19 season, increasing his production with 18 goals and 26 points in 45 games.

On 28 May 2019, the Florida Panthers signed Ābols to a two-year, entry-level contract.

Approaching his second season under contract with the Panthers, on 3 August 2020, Ābols returned to Sweden to begin the 2020–21 season on loan with his former club, Örebro HK. He returned to the SHL with the North American season delayed until mid-November due to the COVID-19 pandemic. On 13 January 2021, Ābols was released by the Florida Panthers.

Following four seasons in the Swedish Hockey League (SHL), Ābols returned to North America after securing a one-year, two-way contract with the Philadelphia Flyers for the 2024–25 season on 16 June 2024. On 21 January 2025, Ābols made his NHL debut in Philadelphia's 2–1 overtime win against the Detroit Red Wings.

On 13 July 2026, he signed a three-year contract with SC Bern of the Swiss National League.

== International play ==
Ābols participated at the 2013 World Junior Ice Hockey Championships as a member of the Latvian national junior team. He made his senior international debut in Prague at the 2015 IIHF World Championships.

He represented Latvia at the 2023 IIHF World Championship where he recorded five goals and two assists and won a bronze medal, Latvia's first ever IIHF World Championship medal.

Ābols was named to the roster for the 2026 Winter Olympics, however he suffered an injury and was subsequently removed from the roster.

== Personal life ==
Ābols is the son of Artis Ābols, who also played ice hockey and has been the head coach of Dinamo Riga and Lada Togliatti of the Kontinental Hockey League, and Zemgale of the Latvian Hockey Higher League, as well as assistant coach of the Latvia men's national ice hockey team.

== Career statistics ==
=== Regular season and playoffs ===
			Regular season					Playoffs
Season	Team	League	GP	G	A	Pts	PIM	GP	G	A	Pts	PIM
2011–12	SK Rīga 16	LAT U18	22	20	18	38	18	—	—	—	—	—
2012–13	SK Rīga 17	LHHL	14	10	13	23	6	—	—	—	—	—
2013–14	HK Rīga	MHL	44	7	9	16	34	10	1	0	1	12
2013–14	HK Rīga	LHHL	1	1	3	4	0	—	—	—	—	—
2014–15	HK Rīga	MHL	35	20	18	38	61	3	0	1	1	2
2014–15	Dinamo Rīga	KHL	14	1	4	5	4	—	—	—	—	—
2015–16	Portland Winterhawks	WHL	62	20	29	49	42	4	0	1	1	4
2016–17	Portland Winterhawks	WHL	2	0	1	1	7	—	—	—	—	—
2016–17	Acadie–Bathurst Titan	QMJHL	52	18	32	50	43	11	5	6	11	12
2017–18	Örebro HK	SHL	26	0	1	1	6	—	—	—	—	—
2017–18	BIK Karlskoga	Allsv	18	7	10	17	20	—	—	—	—	—
2018–19	Örebro HK	SHL	45	18	8	26	20	2	0	1	1	0
2019–20	Springfield Thunderbirds	AHL	36	7	16	23	15	—	—	—	—	—
2019–20	Greenville Swamp Rabbits	ECHL	4	3	1	4	4	—	—	—	—	—
2020–21	Örebro HK	SHL	47	20	15	35	16	9	3	7	10	2
2021–22	Örebro HK	SHL	47	14	20	34	6	8	7	3	10	0
2022–23	Örebro HK	SHL	51	19	22	41	12	13	0	6	6	2
2023–24	Rögle BK	SHL	50	14	12	26	10	15	5	7	12	2
2024–25	Lehigh Valley Phantoms	AHL	47	15	17	32	12	7	2	0	2	0
2024–25	Philadelphia Flyers	NHL	22	2	3	5	4	—	—	—	—	—
2025–26	Philadelphia Flyers	NHL	42	3	7	10	22	—	—	—	—	—
KHL totals			14	1	4	5	4	—	—	—	—	—
SHL totals			266	85	78	163	70	47	15	24	39	6
NHL totals			64	5	10	15	26	—	—	—	—	—

=== International ===
Medal record

Representing Latvia

Men's ice hockey

World Championships
Bronze medal – third place	2023 Finland/Latvia	

Year	Team	Event	Result	GP	G	A	Pts	PIM
2013	Latvia	EYOF	5th	3	1	3	4	0
2014	Latvia	WJC D1A	2nd place, silver medalist(s)	5	3	2	5	2
2014	Latvia	U18 D1A	1st place, gold medalist(s)	5	1	3	4	2
2015	Latvia	WJC D1A	3rd place, bronze medalist(s)	5	2	2	4	2
2015	Latvia	WC	13th	7	0	0	0	0
2016	Latvia	WJC D1A	1st place, gold medalist(s)	5	4	1	5	0
2016	Latvia	WC	13th	7	0	1	1	0
2016	Latvia	OGQ	DNQ	3	1	2	3	0
2018	Latvia	WC	8th	8	1	4	5	4
2019	Latvia	WC	10th	2	1	0	1	0
2021	Latvia	WC	11th	7	1	1	2	2
2021	Latvia	OGQ	Q	3	3	1	4	0
2022	Latvia	OG	11th	4	1	1	2	2
2022	Latvia	WC	10th	7	1	1	2	4
2023	Latvia	WC	3rd place, bronze medalist(s)	10	5	2	7	4
2024	Latvia	WC	9th	7	2	2	4	8
2024	Latvia	OGQ	Q	3	2	2	4	0
2025	Latvia	WC	10th	3	2	0	2	2
Junior totals				20	10	8	18	6
Senior totals				62	14	12	26	26

== Awards and honours ==
Award	Year
Juniors
MHL All-Star game	2015
SHL
SHL Best Plus/Minus	2022
International
Team Latvia Top 3 Player	2023, 2024

Sporting positions
Preceded by Stefan Warg	Örebro HK captain 2021–23	Succeeded by Glenn Gustafsson
