= Kalle Jellvert =

Swedish ice hockey player

- Born: August 5, 1995 (age 30) Örebro, Sweden
- Height: 6 ft 0 in (183 cm)
- Weight: 181 lb (82 kg; 12 st 13 lb)
- Position: Centre
- Shoots: Left
- Allsv team Former teams: Modo Hockey; Örebro HK
- Playing career: 2014–present

Kalle Jellvert (born August 5, 1995) is a Swedish professional ice hockey player. He is currently playing with Modo Hockey of the HockeyAllsvenskan (Allsv).

Jellvert made his Swedish Hockey League debut playing with Örebro HK during the 2014–15 SHL season.
