= Erik Gustafsson (ice hockey, born 1992) =

Swedish ice hockey player (born 1992)

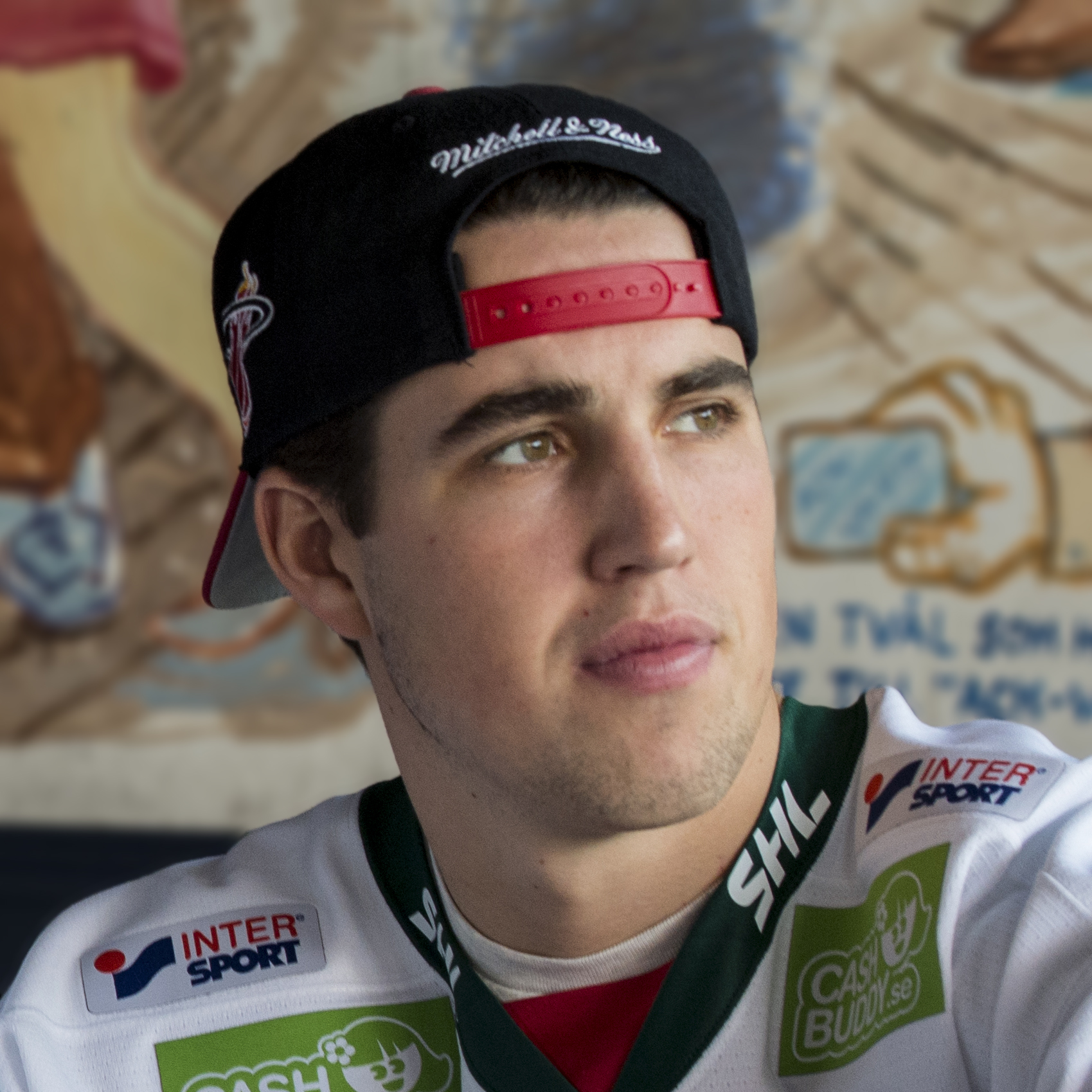
- Gustafsson with Frölunda HC in 2013
- Born: 14 March 1992 (age 34) Nynäshamn, Sweden
- Height: 6 ft 0 in (183 cm)
- Weight: 197 lb (89 kg; 14 st 1 lb)
- Position: Defence
- Shoots: Left
- NHL team Former teams: Los Angeles Kings; Djurgårdens IF; Frölunda HC; Chicago Blackhawks; Calgary Flames; Philadelphia Flyers; Montreal Canadiens; Washington Capitals; Toronto Maple Leafs; New York Rangers; Detroit Red Wings
- National team: Sweden
- NHL draft: 93rd overall, 2012; Edmonton Oilers
- Playing career: 2011–present

Erik Gustafsson (born 14 March 1992) is a Swedish professional ice hockey defenceman for the Los Angeles Kings of the National Hockey League (NHL). He previously played for the Chicago Blackhawks, Calgary Flames, Philadelphia Flyers, Montreal Canadiens, Washington Capitals, Toronto Maple Leafs, New York Rangers, and Detroit Red Wings. Gustafsson was selected by the Edmonton Oilers in the fourth round, 93rd overall, of the 2012 NHL entry draft.

== Playing career ==
Gustafsson began playing hockey in Nynäshamns IF, before moving to Djurgårdens IF's youth organisation. Gustafsson represented team Stockholm in the 2008 TV-pucken, a national junior tournament, scoring four assists. He played the 2008–09 season with Djurgården's under-18 team. In the following season, Gustafsson played for both the under-18 team and the J20-team. For the 2010–11 season, Gustafsson had a permanent place in the J20-team which won their division and ended up third in the playoffs. He extended his contract with Djurgårdens IF in May 2011 through to the 2013–14 season.

Gustafsson was called to make his Elitserien (now the Swedish Hockey League (SHL)) debut in the 2011–12 season opener against HV71 on 15 September 2011, but did not receive any game-time. In his second game, against Brynäs IF on 27 September 2011, he made his on-ice debut, playing six minutes of the game. Gustafsson scored his first Elitserien goal on 26 December 2011 against Fredrik Norrena of Linköpings HC.

On 23 June 2012, at the 2012 NHL entry draft, Gustafsson was selected in the fourth round, 93rd overall by the Edmonton Oilers.

On 4 April 2013, with Djurgårdens IF demoted to the second-tier HockeyAllsvenskan, Gustafsson left the team to sign a contract with SHL club Frölunda HC.

After two successful seasons establishing himself with Frölunda, and with his NHL playing rights not retained by Edmonton, on 30 April 2015, Gustafsson signed a two-year contract with the Chicago Blackhawks.

=== Chicago Blackhawks ===
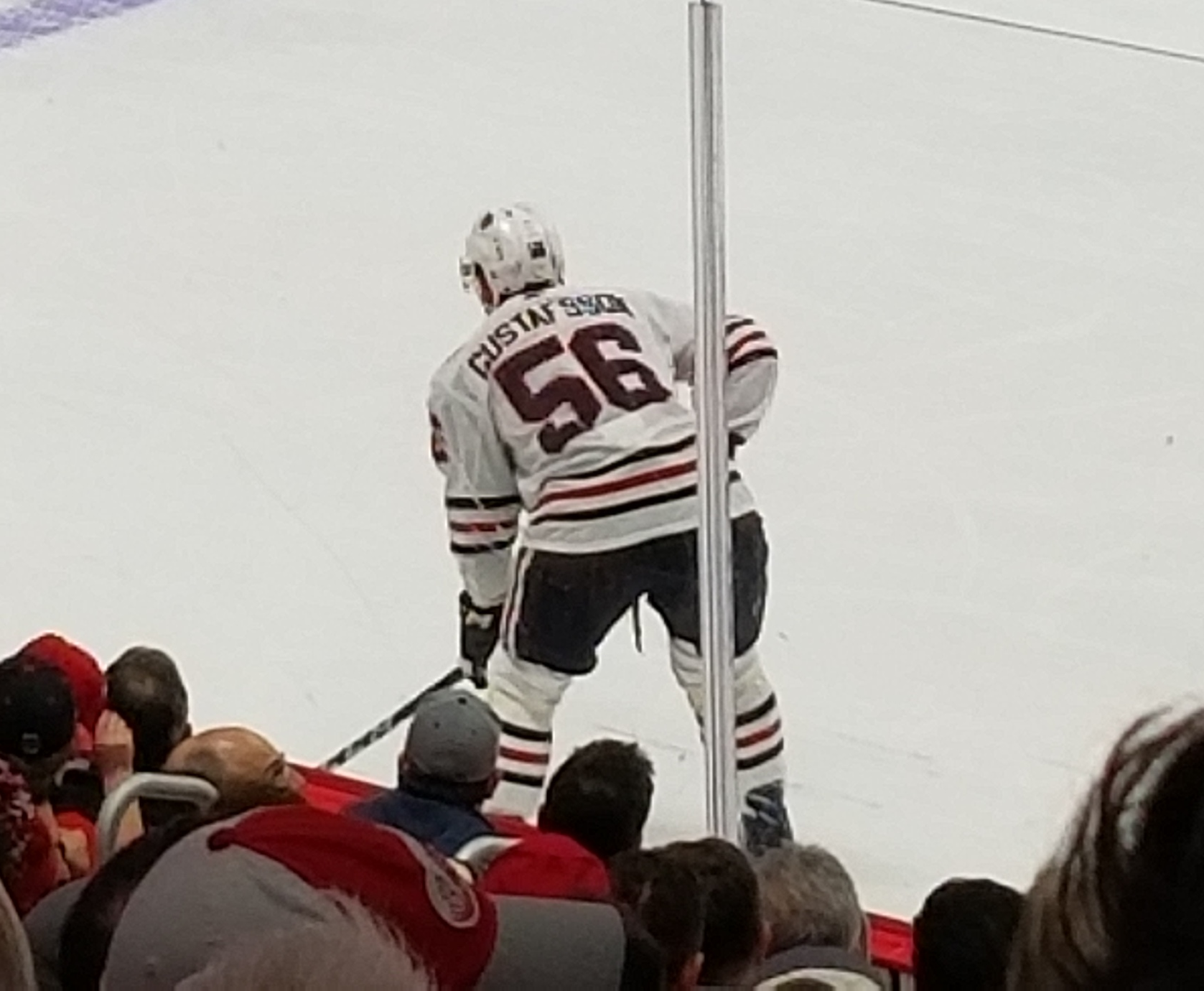
Gustafsson playing with the Chicago Blackhawks in January 2018

Gustafsson began the 2017–18 season with Chicago's American Hockey League (AHL) affiliate, the Rockford IceHogs, but was recalled to the NHL on 9 January 2018. He recorded his first NHL goal and added an assist in a 7–3 loss to the New York Islanders on 20 January. On 6 March, Gustafsson signed a two-year contract extension with Chicago.

=== Calgary Flames ===
In the 2019–20 season, Gustafsson entering the final season of his contract was unable to keep his scoring pace from the previous season. Adding 6 goals and 26 points in 59 games and with the Blackhawks out of contention for a playoff berth, Gustafsson was dealt by Chicago at the NHL trade deadline to the Calgary Flames in exchange for a 2020 third-round pick on 24 February 2020.

=== Philadelphia Flyers ===
Un-signed from the Flames, Gustafsson left as a free agent at the conclusion of his contract and later agreed to a one-year, $3 million contract with the Philadelphia Flyers on 12 October 2020. In the pandemic delayed 2020–21 season, he appeared in 24 games with the Flyers recording 1 goal and 10 points. Unable to cement a role within the Flyers blueline he was dealt at the trade deadline to the Montreal Canadiens in exchange for a seventh-round pick in 2022 on 12 April 2021.

=== Return to Chicago ===
On 21 September 2021, Gustafsson was signed to a professional tryout contract (PTO) by the New York Islanders. On 10 October, Gustafsson was released from his PTO and signed a one-year, $800,000 contract with the Chicago Blackhawks, marking his second stint with the team.

=== Washington Capitals and Toronto Maple Leafs ===
At the conclusion of his contract with the Blackhawks, Gustafsson left as a free agent and was signed to a one-year, $800,000 contract with the Washington Capitals on 13 July 2022. In the 2022–NHL season, on 17 December, Gustafsson scored his first three goals of the season for his first career hat-trick in a win over the visiting Toronto Maple Leafs. With his ice-time elevated due to an injury to leading defenceman John Carlson, Gustafsson was rejuvenated with the Capitals, scoring 7 goals and 31 assist for 38 points in 61 regular season games. As a pending free agent and with the Capitals looking out of the playoffs, on 28 February, 2023, three days before the trade deadline, Gustafsson was traded to the Maple Leafs, along with a first-round pick in the 2023 NHL entry draft, in exchange for defenceman Rasmus Sandin.

=== New York Rangers ===
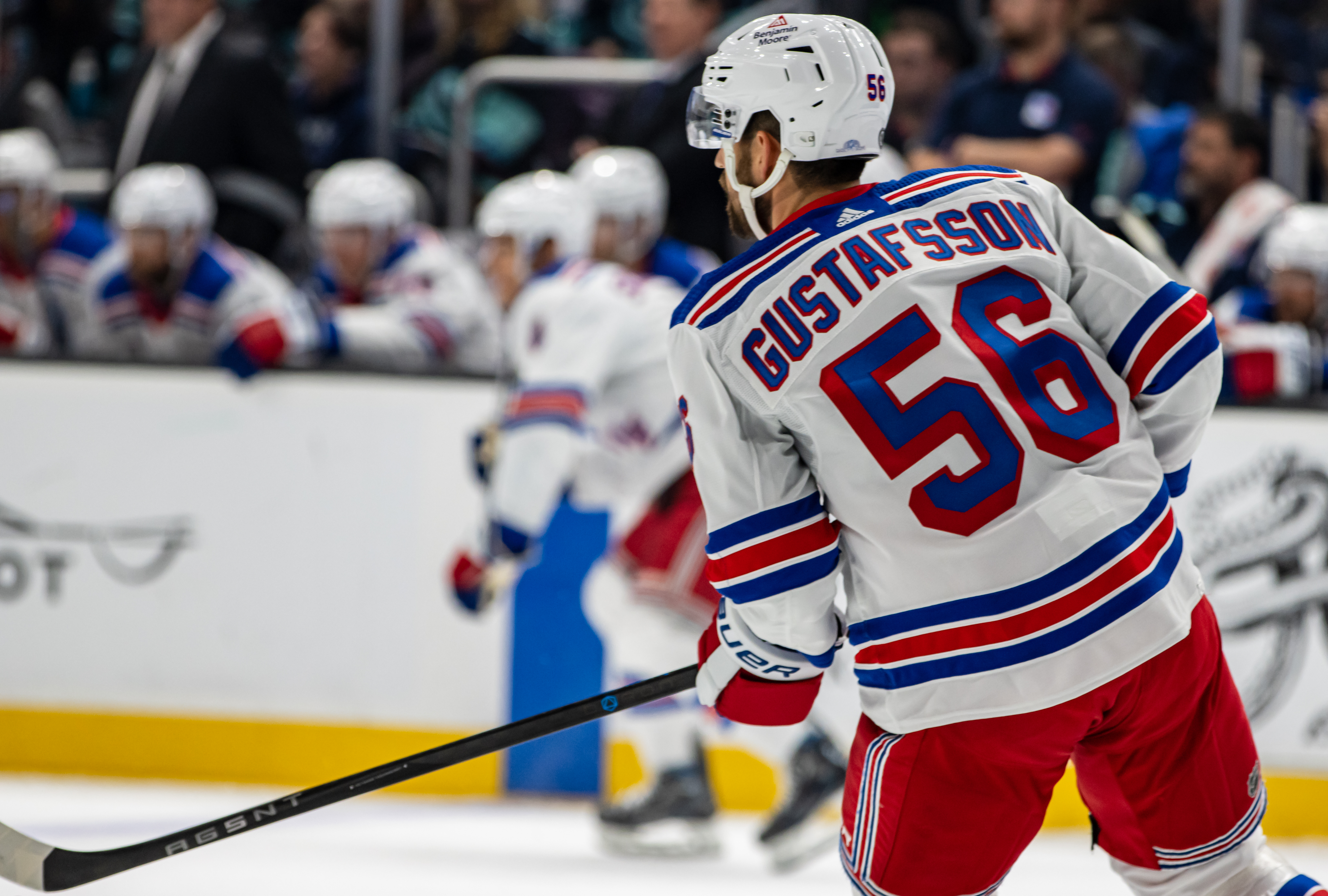
Gustafsson playing with the New York Rangers in 2023

As a free agent from the Maple Leafs, Gustafsson signed a one-year, $825,000 contract with the New York Rangers on 1 July 2023. During the 2023–24 season he recorded six goals and 25 assists in 76 games for the Rangers.

=== Detroit Red Wings ===
On 1 July 2024, Gustafsson signed a two-year, $4 million contract with the Detroit Red Wings.

=== Los Angeles Kings ===
As a free agent at the conclusion of his contract with the Red Wings, Gustafsson continued his career in the NHL securing a one-year, $1 million contract with the Los Angeles Kings for the 2026–27 season on 1 July 2026.

== Personal life ==
Gustafsson's younger brother Glenn is also a professional hockey player, currently playing for Örebro HK in the SHL.

== International play ==
Medal record

Representing Sweden

Ice hockey

World Championships
Gold medal – first place	2018 Denmark	
Bronze medal – third place	2025 Sweden/Denmark	

Gustafsson represented Sweden at the 2018 IIHF World Championship and recorded one assist in six games and won a gold medal.

== Career statistics ==
=== Regular season and playoffs ===
			Regular season					Playoffs
Season	Team	League	GP	G	A	Pts	PIM	GP	G	A	Pts	PIM
2008–09	Djurgårdens IF	J18	22	2	7	9	10	—	—	—	—	—
2008–09	Djurgårdens IF	J18 Allsv	11	0	1	1	12	2	0	0	0	0
2009–10	Djurgårdens IF	J18	15	4	7	11	24	—	—	—	—	—
2009–10	Djurgårdens IF	J18 Allsv	12	3	6	9	30	3	0	0	0	0
2009–10	Djurgårdens IF	J20	24	0	8	8	26	—	—	—	—	—
2010–11	Djurgårdens IF	J20	38	2	21	23	104	4	0	1	1	6
2011–12	Djurgårdens IF	J20	21	3	11	14	14	—	—	—	—	—
2011–12	Djurgårdens IF	SEL	41	3	4	7	16	—	—	—	—	—
2012–13	Djurgårdens IF	Allsv	49	7	16	23	52	6	1	0	1	30
2013–14	Frölunda HC	SHL	50	2	18	20	16	—	—	—	—	—
2014–15	Frölunda HC	SHL	55	4	25	29	22	12	1	2	3	31
2015–16	Rockford IceHogs	AHL	27	3	8	11	38	—	—	—	—	—
2015–16	Chicago Blackhawks	NHL	41	0	14	14	4	5	0	1	1	0
2016–17	Rockford IceHogs	AHL	68	5	25	30	40	—	—	—	—	—
2017–18	Rockford IceHogs	AHL	25	3	14	17	18	—	—	—	—	—
2017–18	Chicago Blackhawks	NHL	35	5	11	16	6	—	—	—	—	—
2018–19	Chicago Blackhawks	NHL	79	17	43	60	34	—	—	—	—	—
2019–20	Chicago Blackhawks	NHL	59	6	20	26	25	—	—	—	—	—
2019–20	Calgary Flames	NHL	7	0	3	3	2	10	0	4	4	2
2020–21	Philadelphia Flyers	NHL	24	1	9	10	0	—	—	—	—	—
2020–21	Montreal Canadiens	NHL	5	0	2	2	0	16	1	2	3	0
2021–22	Chicago Blackhawks	NHL	59	3	15	18	14	—	—	—	—	—
2022–23	Washington Capitals	NHL	61	7	31	38	21	—	—	—	—	—
2022–23	Toronto Maple Leafs	NHL	9	0	4	4	2	2	1	0	1	0
2023–24	New York Rangers	NHL	76	6	25	31	35	16	0	3	3	8
2024–25	Detroit Red Wings	NHL	60	2	16	18	20	—	—	—	—	—
2025–26	Grand Rapids Griffins	AHL	39	4	33	37	32	8	1	5	6	2
2025–26	Detroit Red Wings	NHL	2	0	0	0	2	—	—	—	—	—
SHL totals			146	9	47	56	54	12	1	2	3	31
NHL totals			517	47	193	240	165	49	2	10	12	10

=== International ===
Year	Team	Event	Result	GP	G	A	Pts	PIM
2016	Sweden	WC	6th	8	0	2	2	0
2018	Sweden	WC	1st place, gold medalist(s)	6	0	1	1	2
2019	Sweden	WC	5th	8	2	2	4	2
2022	Sweden	WC	6th	8	0	7	7	4
2025	Sweden	WC	3rd place, bronze medalist(s)	10	0	7	7	4
Senior totals				40	2	19	21	12
