= Artis Ābols =

Latvian ice hockey player and coach

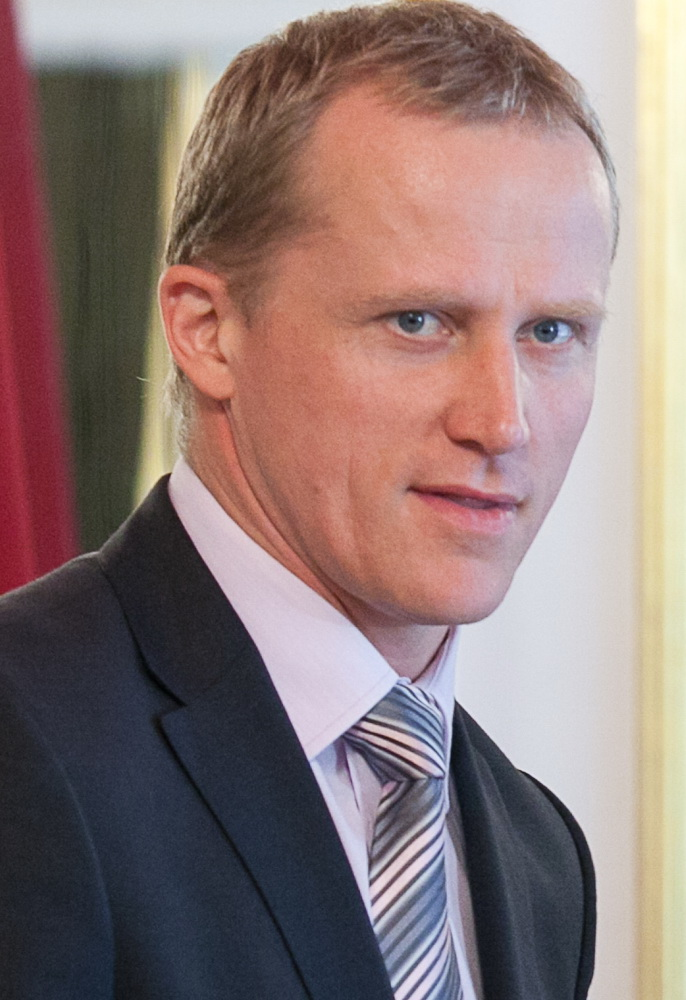
- Born: January 3, 1973 (age 53) Riga, Latvian SSR, Soviet Union
- Height: 6 ft 0 in (183 cm)
- Weight: 203 lb (92 kg; 14 st 7 lb)
- Position: Forward
- Shot: Left
- Played for: HK Pārdaugava Rīga; Odense IK; HK Metalurgs Liepāja; Vojens IK; HK Rīga 2000
- National team: Latvia
- Playing career: 1991–2008

Artis Ābols (born January 3, 1973) is a Latvian former professional ice hockey forward and coach. He is the current head coach of HK Zemgale/LLU of the Latvian Hockey Higher League, as well as an assistant coach of the Latvia men's national ice hockey team. His son, Rodrigo Ābols, is also an ice hockey player and was selected by the Vancouver Canucks in the 2016 NHL entry draft.

== Career statistics ==
=== Regular season and playoffs ===
			Regular season					Playoffs
Season	Team	League	GP	G	A	Pts	PIM	GP	G	A	Pts	PIM
1991–92	HK Pārdaugava Rīga	LHL	16	24	12	36	14	—	—	—	—	—
1992–93	HK Pārdaugava Rīga	IHL	36	4	4	8	26	2	0	1	1	5
1992–93	HK Pārdaugava Rīga	LHL	11	11	8	19	6	—	—	—	—	—
1993–94	HK Pārdaugava Rīga	IHL	32	7	7	14	10	—	—	—	—	—
1994–95	HK Pārdaugava Rīga	IHL	13	0	0	0	10	—	—	—	—	—
1994–95	HK Pārdaugava Rīga	LHL	12	15	14	29	12	—	—	—	—	—
1995–96	HK Pārdaugava Rīga	LHL	35	40	—	40	—	—	—	—	—	—
1996–97	Nittorps IK	Division 2	32	26	27	53	—	—	—	—	—	—
1997–98	Odense Bulldogs	Denmark	49	42	52	94	80	—	—	—	—	—
1998–99	Kokkolan Hermes	Mestis	12	4	5	9	12	—	—	—	—	—
1998–99	Kiekko-Pojat	Mestis	26	14	11	25	55	—	—	—	—	—
1999–00	HK Liepājas Metalurgs	EEHL	2	0	1	1	0	—	—	—	—	—
1999–00	IK Nyköpings NH 90	HockeyAllsvenskan	42	13	23	36	24	—	—	—	—	—
2000–01	IK Nyköpings NH 90	HockeyAllsvenskan	38	19	24	43	34	3	1	0	1	0
2001–02	IK Nyköpings NH 90	HockeyAllsvenskan	41	19	23	42	50	—	—	—	—	—
2002–03	Vojens IK	Denmark	25	11	11	22	38	—	—	—	—	—
2003–04	IK Nyköpings NH 90	HockeyAllsvenskan	25	7	9	16	16	—	—	—	—	—
2003–04	HK Riga 2000	EEHL	15	5	5	10	22	—	—	—	—	—
2003–04	HK Rīga 2000	LHL	11	3	16	19	10	6	3	6	9	4
2004–05	HK Rīga 2000	BXL	33	8	16	24	22	3	0	2	2	2
2004–05	HK Rīga 2000	LHL	4	1	5	6	2	11	2	12	14	10
2005–06	HK Rīga 2000	BXL	48	15	27	42	72	—	—	—	—	—
2005–06	HK Rīga 2000	LHL	—	2	1	3	4	—	—	—	—	—
2006–07	HK Rīga 2000	LHL	50	24	40	64	66	—	—	—	—	—
2007–08	HK Rīga 2000	LHL	40	12	30	42	32	—	—	—	—	—
Career totals			648	326	371	697	617	26	6	21	27	23

=== International ===
Year	Team	Event	GP	G	A	Pts	PIM
1993	Latvia	WC C	7	10	8	18	6
1993	Latvia	OQ	4	1	0	1	0
1999	Latvia	WC	4	0	0	0	0
2000	Latvia	WC	7	0	0	0	2
2001	Latvia	WC	6	1	3	4	4
2002	Latvia	WC	6	0	0	0	4
Senior Int'l totals			34	12	11	23	16
