= Gustav Backström =

Swedish ice hockey player

- Born: January 3, 1995 (age 30) Lindesberg, Sweden
- Height: 6 ft 2 in (188 cm)
- Weight: 198 lb (90 kg; 14 st 2 lb)
- Position: Defence
- Shoots: Left
- SHL team: Örebro HK
- Playing career: 2013–present

Gustav Backström (born January 3, 1995) is a Swedish professional ice hockey defenceman. He is currently playing with Örebro HK of the Swedish Hockey League (SHL).

== Playing career ==
Backström made his Swedish Hockey League debut playing with Örebro HK during the 2013–14 SHL season.

Backström featured in the opening two games of the 2016–17 season with Örebro HK before he was familiarly reassigned to Allsvenskan affiliate, HC Vita Hästen, on September 26, 2016.
