= 2008–09 Division 1 season (Swedish ice hockey) =

- League: Division 1
- Sport: Ice hockey
- Number of teams: 55
- Promoted to Division 1: Örebro HK
- Relegated to Division 2: Näldens IF; AIK Härnösand; Haninge HF; Skå IK; Ulricehamns IF; Helsingborgs HC

Division 1 seasons
- ← 2007–08 2009–10 →

2008–09 was the 10th season that Division 1 functioned as the third-level of ice hockey in Sweden, below the second-level HockeyAllsvenskan and the top-level Elitserien (now the SHL).

== Format ==
The 55 participating teams played the first half of the season in six groups divided geographically. The successful teams then moved into three new groups (the Allettan groups), while the remaining teams played in a continuation of their smaller existing groups. The teams with the worst records in these continuation groups were then forced to defend their places in Division 1 against challengers from Division 2 (see "relegation tournament" below) in a round-robin tournament called Kvalserien till Division 1. Meanwhile, the successful teams from the Allettan groups along with the group winners of the continuation groups played a playoff to determine who would have a chance to compete for promotion to the second-tier league HockeyAllsvenskan in Kvalserien till HockeyAllsvenskan.

== First round ==
=== Division 1A ===
	Club	GP	W	OTW	SOW	SOL	OTL	L	GF	GA	Pts
1.	Asplöven HC	24	16	2	2	2	0	2	144	50	58
2.	Kiruna IF	24	17	0	1	1	0	5	139	54	54
3.	Piteå HC	24	16	0	1	3	1	3	107	51	54
4.	Lycksele SK	24	7	0	3	2	2	10	69	102	31
5.	Bodens HF	24	6	1	2	1	0	14	82	125	25
6.	Clemensnäs HC	24	5	1	1	1	0	16	54	118	20
7.	Kalix HF	24	2	1	0	0	2	19	57	152	10

=== Division 1B ===
	Club	GP	W	OTW	SOW	SOL	OTL	L	GF	GA	Pts
1.	Östersund/Brunflo IF	28	16	2	1	3	1	5	111	74	58
2.	KB 65	28	14	3	1	1	0	9	102	83	51
3.	LN 91	28	13	1	3	0	2	9	106	93	49
4.	Hudiksvalls HC	28	13	1	1	1	4	8	89	80	48
5.	Kovlands IF	28	13	2	0	1	2	10	105	92	46
6.	AIK Härnösand	28	9	3	3	1	0	12	94	98	40
7.	Ånge IK	28	5	1	2	1	2	17	81	131	24
8.	Näldens IF	28	4	1	0	3	3	17	78	115	20

=== Division 1C ===
	Club	GP	W	OTW	SOW	SOL	OTL	L	GF	GA	Pts
1.	Valbo HC	27	17	1	2	0	2	5	129	75	59
2.	Enköpings SK	27	13	5	0	1	2	6	105	75	52
3.	Surahammars IF	27	16	1	0	0	1	9	97	86	51
4.	IFK Arboga	27	15	1	0	2	0	9	103	75	49
5.	Linden HC	27	12	2	1	0	1	11	93	96	43
6.	Borlänge HF	27	13	0	0	0	1	13	89	106	40
7.	Bålsta HC	27	10	2	1	1	2	11	88	93	39
8.	Tierps HK	27	6	2	1	2	4	12	85	107	30
9.	Hedemora SK	27	6	0	2	1	2	16	71	107	25
10.	Järfälla HC	27	4	1	1	1	0	20	79	119	17

=== Division 1D ===
	Club	GP	W	OTW	SOW	SOL	OTL	L	GF	GA	Pts
1.	Nyköpings HK	27	21	0	1	1	1	3	148	60	67
2.	Väsby IK	27	13	3	5	0	0	6	101	80	55
3.	Wings HC Arlanda	27	13	2	2	0	1	9	100	73	48
4.	Visby-Roma HK	27	11	2	1	2	2	9	103	101	43
5.	Botkyrka HC	27	11	2	1	1	1	11	119	116	41
6.	Nacka HK	27	9	3	0	1	3	11	100	101	37
7.	Haninge HF	27	8	3	1	1	2	12	84	103	35
8.	Mälarhöjden/Br.	27	7	4	0	2	4	10	83	111	35
9.	Trångsunds IF	27	8	0	1	2	2	14	91	107	30
10.	Skå IK	27	3	0	0	2	3	19	85	162	14

=== Division 1E ===
	Club	GP	W	OTW	SOW	SOL	OTL	L	GF	GA	Pts
1.	Örebro HK	27	21	1	0	2	0	3	134	61	67
2.	HC Vita Hästen	27	21	1	1	0	0	4	132	62	67
3.	Skåre BK	27	18	0	0	1	1	7	105	65	56
4.	Tranås AIF	27	16	0	1	1	1	8	118	72	52
5.	Mjölby HC	27	14	0	1	1	0	11	98	89	45
6.	Västerviks IK	27	11	1	2	0	0	13	114	112	39
7.	Lindlövens IF	27	7	0	2	0	1	17	74	131	26
8.	IFK Munkfors	27	7	0	1	2	0	17	79	135	25
9.	IFK Kumla	27	7	0	0	1	0	19	66	116	22
10.	Sunne IK	27	2	0	0	0	0	25	59	136	6

=== Division 1F ===
	Club	GP	W	OTW	SOW	SOL	OTL	L	GF	GA	Pts
1.	Tingsryds AIF	27	17	2	3	0	0	5	116	56	61
2.	IK Pantern	27	15	0	3	3	1	5	88	56	55
3.	Kungälvs IK	27	14	2	1	3	0	7	94	66	51
4.	Skövde IK	27	14	1	1	1	4	6	100	76	51
5.	Olofströms IK	27	13	2	1	2	1	8	110	80	48
6.	Karlskrona HK	27	11	3	0	1	3	9	91	73	43
7.	Kristianstads IK	27	9	3	2	0	1	12	92	88	38
8.	Ulricehamns IF	27	6	3	0	0	2	16	50	92	26
9.	Gislaveds SK	27	5	0	0	1	3	18	60	116	19
10.	Helsingborgs HC	27	4	0	0	0	1	22	49	147	13

== AllEttan ==
=== Northern Group (A/B) ===
	Club	GP	W	OTW	SOW	SOL	OTL	L	GF	GA	Pts
1.	Asplöven HC	10	6	1	1	0	0	2	59	29	22
2.	Piteå HC	10	7	0	0	0	1	2	41	23	22
3.	Östersund/Brunflo IF	10	6	1	0	0	0	3	37	26	20
4.	Kiruna IF	10	5	0	0	1	0	4	48	35	16
5.	KB 65	10	2	0	0	0	0	8	32	65	6
6.	LN 91	10	1	0	0	0	1	8	26	65	4

=== Central Group (C/D) ===
	Club	GP	W	OTW	SOW	SOL	OTL	L	GF	GA	Pts
1.	Valbo HC	14	9	1	0	1	1	2	70	41	31
2.	Enköpings SK	14	8	0	1	0	1	4	53	39	27
3.	Nyköpings HK	14	7	0	1	0	0	6	58	48	23
4.	Visby Roma HK	14	7	0	0	2	0	5	42	49	23
5.	IFK Arboga IK	14	5	2	0	0	0	7	44	37	19
6.	Surahammars IF	14	6	0	0	1	0	7	39	44	19
7.	Väsby IK	14	4	0	1	0	1	8	38	55	15
8.	Wings HC Arlanda	14	3	0	1	0	0	10	37	68	11

=== Southern Group (E/F) ===
	Club	GP	W	OTW	SOW	SOL	OTL	L	GF	GA	Pts
1.	Tingsryds AIF	14	9	1	3	0	0	1	49	24	35
2.	Örebro HK	14	8	2	0	2	0	2	59	33	30
3.	Skåre BK	14	8	0	0	1	0	5	40	37	25
4.	IK Pantern	14	6	1	1	1	1	4	46	41	24
5.	HC Vita Hästen	14	7	0	0	0	1	6	44	41	22
6.	Skövde IK	14	5	0	1	0	1	7	53	55	18
7.	Tranås AIF	14	3	0	1	1	1	8	38	60	13
8.	Kungälvs IK	14	0	0	0	1	0	13	23	61	1

== Qualification round ==
=== Division 1A continuation ===
	Club	GP	W	OTW	SOW	SOL	OTL	L	GF	GA	Pts (Bonus)
1.	Clemensnäs HC	6	5	0	0	0	0	1	24	13	16(1)
2.	Bodens HF	6	3	0	0	0	0	3	17	17	11(2)
3.	Kalix HC	6	3	0	0	0	0	3	18	19	9(0)
4.	Lycksele SK	6	1	0	0	0	0	5	13	23	7(4)

=== Division 1B continuation ===
	Club	GP	W	OTW	SOW	SOL	OTL	L	GF	GA	Pts (Bonus)
1.	Hudiksvalls HC	8	6	0	0	0	0	2	36	18	24(6)
2.	Kovlands IF	8	6	0	0	0	0	2	34	21	22(4)
3.	Ånge IK	8	5	0	0	0	0	3	34	28	16(1)
4.	AIK Härnösand	8	1	0	1	0	0	6	14	35	7(2)
5.	Näldens IF	8	1	0	0	1	0	6	18	34	4(0)

=== Division 1C continuation ===
	Club	GP	W	OTW	SOW	SOL	OTL	L	GF	GA	Pts (Bonus)
1.	Borlänge HF	10	7	0	0	0	0	3	50	37	27(6)
2.	Tierps HK	10	7	0	0	1	0	2	49	36	24(2)
3.	Bålsta HC	10	6	1	0	0	0	3	38	35	24(4)
4.	Linden HC	10	5	0	0	0	0	5	43	37	23(8)
5.	Hedemora SK	10	1	0	1	0	2	6	29	48	8(1)
6.	Järfälla HC	10	1	1	0	0	0	8	34	50	5(0)

=== Division 1D continuation ===
	Club	GP	W	OTW	SOW	SOL	OTL	L	GF	GA	Pts (Bonus)
1.	Botkyrka HC	10	4	3	0	0	0	3	52	38	26(8)
2.	Nacka HK	10	6	0	0	0	1	3	39	30	25(6)
3.	Mälarh./Bredäng	10	7	0	0	0	0	3	41	31	23(2)
4.	Trångsunds IF	10	5	0	1	0	0	4	37	26	18(1)
5.	Haninge HF	10	3	0	0	2	2	3	26	34	17(4)
6.	Skå IK	10	0	0	1	0	0	9	25	61	2(0)

=== Division 1E continuation ===
	Club	GP	W	OTW	SOW	SOL	OTL	L	GF	GA	Pts (Bonus)
1.	Mjölby HC	10	7	1	0	0	2	0	44	25	33(8)
2.	IFK Kumla	10	7	1	0	0	0	2	40	25	24(1)
3.	Västerviks IK	10	5	0	0	0	0	5	35	32	21(6)
4.	Lindlövens IF	10	4	1	1	0	0	4	42	40	20(4)
5.	IFK Munkfors	10	3	0	0	0	0	7	37	51	11(2)
6.	Sunne IK	10	0	0	0	1	1	8	17	42	2(0)

=== Division 1F continuation ===
	Club	GP	W	OTW	SOW	SOL	OTL	L	GF	GA	Pts (Bonus)
1.	Karlskrona HK	10	5	1	0	0	1	3	39	25	24(6)
2.	Gislaveds SK	10	5	1	2	0	1	1	38	35	23(1)
3.	Olofströms IK	10	4	1	0	0	0	5	37	31	22(8)
4.	Kristianstads IK	10	5	0	0	1	0	4	24	22	20(4)
5.	Ulricehamns IF	10	3	0	0	1	1	5	24	32	13(2)
6.	Helsingborgs HC	10	3	0	0	0	0	7	26	43	9(0)

== Playoffs ==
=== First round ===
- Clemensnäs HC - Hudiksvalls HC 1:2 (3:7, 3:2, 2:4)
- Botkyrka HC - Borlänge HF 0:2 (5:6 OT, 4:5)
- Karlskrona HK - Mjölby HC 2:0 (7:3, 1:0)

=== Second round ===
- Hudiksvalls HC - Piteå HC 0:2 (0:1, 1:8)
- Borlänge HF - Nyköpings HK 0:2 (1:4, 4:5 OT)
- Karlskrona HK - Skåre BK 0:2 (3:5, 5:7)

=== Final round ===
- Piteå HC - Asplöven HC 1:2 (3:2, 1:4, 1:4)
- Nyköpings HK - Tingsryds AIF 0:2 (1:4, 2:8)
- Enköpings SK - Örebro HK 0:2 (1:4, 2:5)
- Skåre BK - Valbo HC 1:2 (4:3 OT, 2:6, 0:2)

== Relegation ==
=== Division 1A ===
	Club	GP	W	OTW	SOW	SOL	OTL	L	GF	GA	Pts
1.	Luleå Rebels HC	4	3	0	0	0	0	1	10	6	9
2.	Lycksele SK	4	2	0	0	0	0	2	13	9	6
3.	Rosvik IK	4	1	0	0	0	0	3	6	14	3

=== Division 1B ===
	Club	GP	W	OTW	SOW	SOL	OTL	L	GF	GA	Pts
1.	Njurunda SK	6	4	1	0	0	0	1	30	13	14
2.	Örnsköldsviks SK	6	4	0	0	0	0	2	21	18	12
3.	AIK Härnösand	6	2	1	0	0	1	2	19	16	9
4.	Sollefteå HK	6	0	0	0	0	1	5	11	34	1

=== Division 1C ===
	Club	GP	W	OTW	SOW	SOL	OTL	L	GF	GA	Pts
1.	Hedemora SK	8	6	1	0	0	1	0	55	21	21
2.	Järfälla HC	8	5	1	0	0	1	1	52	21	18
3.	Skedvi/Säter IF	8	5	0	0	0	0	3	39	39	15
4.	Avesta BK	8	2	0	0	0	0	6	34	41	6
5.	Uppsala HC	8	0	0	0	0	0	8	16	74	0

=== Division 1D ===
	Club	GP	W	OTW	SOW	SOL	OTL	L	GF	GA	Pts
1.	Nynäshamns IF	8	6	0	0	0	0	2	32	23	18
2.	Vallentuna BK	8	3	2	0	0	2	1	27	19	15
3.	Haninge HF	8	3	2	0	0	1	2	26	18	14
4.	Lidingö HC	8	2	2	0	0	1	3	25	21	11
5.	Skå IK	8	0	0	0	0	2	6	18	47	2

=== Division 1E ===
	Club	GP	W	OTW	SOW	SOL	OTL	L	GF	GA	Pts
1.	Sunne IK	8	8	0	0	0	0	0	37	16	24
2.	IFK Munkfors	8	5	0	0	0	0	3	34	28	15
3.	Boro/Vetlanda HC	8	5	0	0	0	0	3	29	23	15
4.	Arvika HC	8	2	0	0	0	0	6	28	41	6
5.	Grums IK	8	0	0	0	0	0	8	21	41	0

=== Division 1F ===
	Club	GP	W	OTW	SOW	SOL	OTL	L	GF	GA	Pts
1.	Halmstad HF	8	6	1	0	0	0	1	38	19	20
2.	Mörrums GoIS	8	5	0	0	0	0	3	34	25	15
3.	Ulricehamns IF	8	4	0	0	0	1	3	27	26	13
4.	Helsingborgs HC	8	2	0	0	0	0	6	18	31	6
5.	Jonstorps IF	8	2	0	0	0	0	6	20	36	6
