= Glenn Gustafsson =

Swedish ice hockey player

- Born: 4 September 1998 (age 27) Stockholm, Sweden
- Height: 5 ft 10 in (178 cm)
- Weight: 203 lb (92 kg; 14 st 7 lb)
- Position: Left Wing
- Shoots: Left
- SHL team Former teams: Örebro HK; Växjö Lakers
- Playing career: 2016–present

Glenn Gustafsson (born 4 September 1998) is a Swedish professional ice hockey forward currently playing for Örebro HK of the Swedish Hockey League (SHL).

== Personal life ==
Gustafsson's older brother Erik currently plays for the Detroit Red Wings organization.
