= Behrn Arena (ice hockey) =

Ice hockey arena in Örebro, Sweden

Coordinates: 59°15′58″N 15°13′33″E

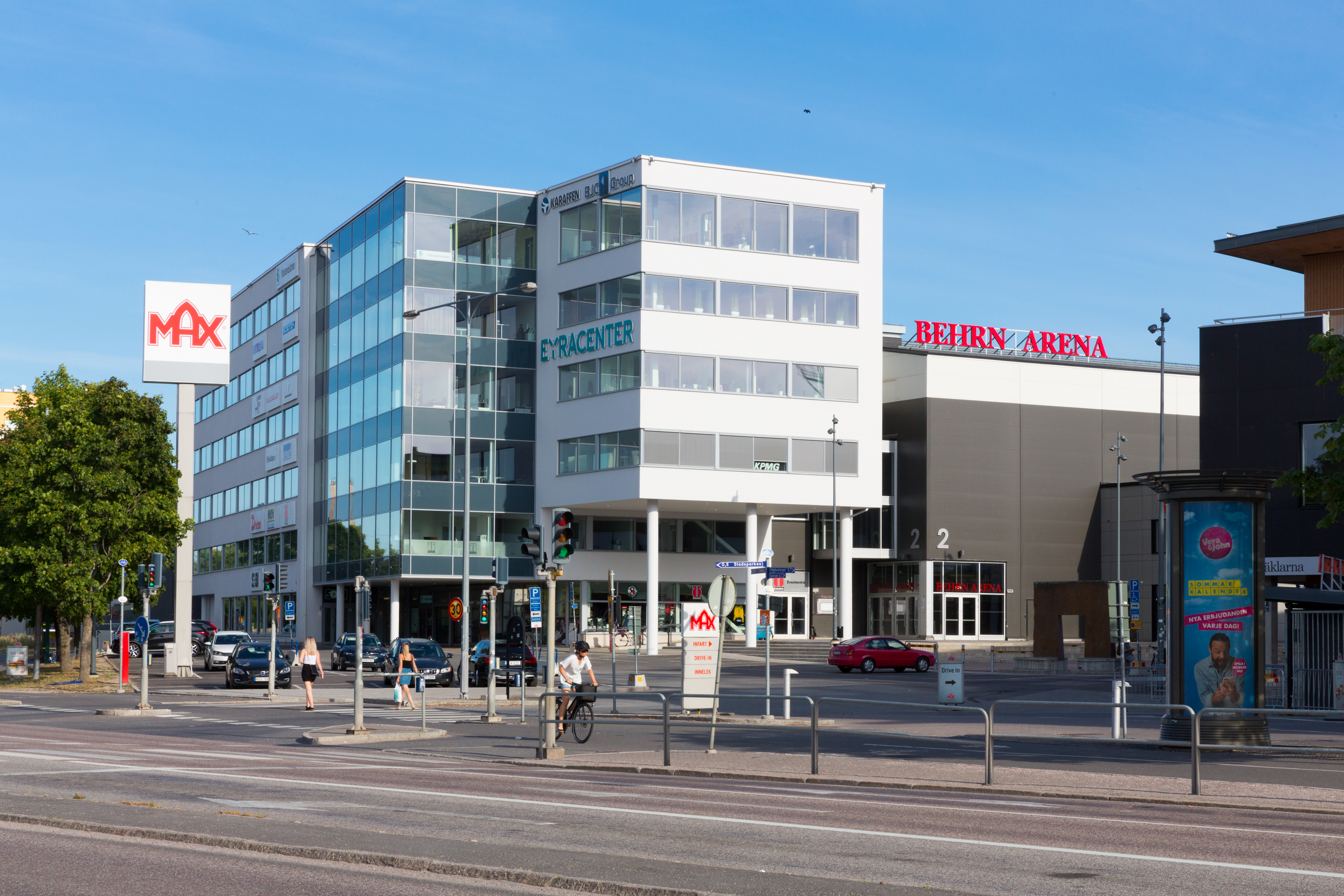
- Behrn Arena in July 2018
- Interactive map of Behrn Arena
- Location: Örebro, Sweden
- Capacity: 5,500
- Type: indoor arena

Construction
- Opened: 1 January 1965
- Renovated: 2010–2011

Tenant
- Örebro HK

Behrn Arena is an indoor arena located in Örebro, Sweden. It is the ice hockey club Örebro HK's home arena. The arena opened on 1 January 1965 and previously had a capacity of 4,400 spectators, but after a renovation that began in 2010 and finished in September 2011, this number increased to 5,200. The finished renovation of the arena was inaugurated on 28 September 2011. The current capacity is 5,500.

On 27 March 1967, the Rolling Stones performed two shows at the arena, during their sixth European tour. Which was the only concert that was held at the venue.

== See also ==
- List of indoor arenas in Sweden
- List of indoor arenas in Nordic countries
