= Jens Bergenström =

Swedish ice hockey player (born 1980)

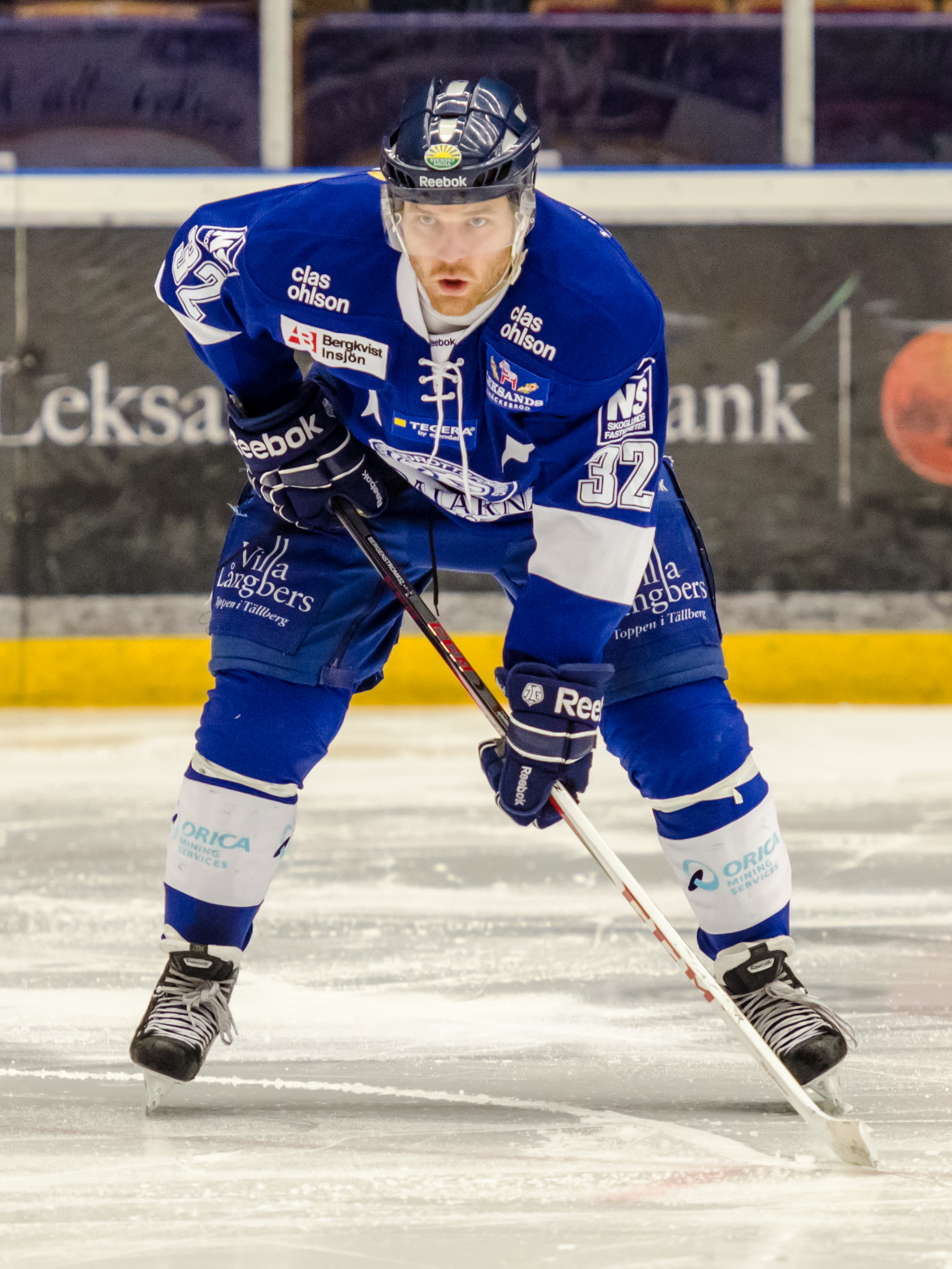
- Born: September 12, 1980 (age 45) Borlänge, Sweden
- Height: 6 ft 1 in (185 cm)
- Weight: 205 lb (93 kg; 14 st 9 lb)
- Position: Winger
- Shot: Left
- Played for: Leksands IF; SaiPa
- Playing career: 2000–2019

Jens Bergenström (born November 11, 1980) is a Swedish former professional ice hockey winger who last played for Leksands IF of the Swedish Hockey League (SHL).

== Playing career ==
Bergenström played with the legendary club Leksands IF since 2004, including 3 Elitserien games in 2003–04 and 49 games in 2005–06. He also had tenures with Mörrums GoIS IK of the HockeyAllsvenskan and SaiPa of the Finnish Liiga.

On April 8, 2013, Bergenström extended his stay in the SHL with Leksands in agreeing to a two-year contract extension. On January 15, 2016, Bergenström announced his retirement from the SHL.

He made an informal return from his retirement, featuring in the lower Divisions each year with Ludvika HF and Smedjebacken HC through 2019.

== Career statistics ==
| | | | Regular season | | | | | Playoffs |
| Season | Team | League | GP | G | A | Pts | PIM | GP | G | A | Pts | PIM |
|---|---|---|---|---|---|---|---|---|---|---|---|---|
| 1998–99 | Borlänge HF | Division 2 | 31 | 6 | 6 | 12 | 6 | — | — | — | — | — |
| 1999–00 | Borlänge HF | Division 1 | 27 | 18 | 21 | 39 | — | — | — | — | — | — |
| 2000–01 | Mörrums GoIS IK | Allsvenskan | 25 | 4 | 2 | 6 | 2 | — | — | — | — | — |
| 2001–02 | Mörrums GoIS IK | Allsvenksan | 35 | 11 | 7 | 18 | 8 | 10 | 6 | 5 | 11 | 0 |
| 2002–03 | Mörrums GoIS IK | Allsvenskan | 41 | 12 | 10 | 22 | 14 | — | — | — | — | — |
| 2003–04 | Mörrums GoIS IK | Allsvenskan | 45 | 31 | 21 | 52 | 22 | — | — | — | — | — |
| 2003–04 | Leksands IF | SHL | 3 | 0 | 0 | 0 | 2 | — | — | — | — | — |
| 2004–05 | Leksands IF J20 | J20 SuperElit | 2 | 3 | 2 | 5 | 2 | — | — | — | — | — |
| 2004–05 | Leksands IF | Allsvenskan | 44 | 11 | 10 | 21 | 10 | 10 | 0 | 1 | 1 | 0 |
| 2005–06 | Leksands IF | SHL | 49 | 8 | 4 | 12 | 16 | 10 | 6 | 2 | 8 | 2 |
| 2006–07 | SaiPa | Liiga | 21 | 2 | 3 | 5 | 16 | — | — | — | — | — |
| 2006–07 | Leksands IF | Allsvenksan | 25 | 10 | 19 | 29 | 16 | 10 | 4 | 1 | 5 | 0 |
| 2007–08 | Leksands IF | Allsvenskan | 41 | 29 | 29 | 58 | 28 | 10 | 0 | 2 | 2 | 0 |
| 2008–09 | Leksands IF | Allsvenskan | 41 | 17 | 27 | 44 | 14 | 5 | 0 | 1 | 1 | 8 |
| 2009–10 | Leksands IF J20 | J20 SuperElit | 3 | 2 | 1 | 3 | 2 | — | — | — | — | — |
| 2009–10 | Leksands IF | Allsvenskan | 16 | 1 | 4 | 5 | 4 | 10 | 1 | 1 | 2 | 0 |
| 2010–11 | Leksands IF | Allsvenskan | 45 | 26 | 23 | 49 | 28 | — | — | — | — | — |
| 2011–12 | Leksands IF | Allsvenskan | 45 | 19 | 16 | 35 | 12 | 10 | 6 | 1 | 7 | 0 |
| 2012–13 | Leksands IF | Allsvenskan | 51 | 18 | 22 | 40 | 12 | 10 | 6 | 5 | 11 | 4 |
| 2013–14 | Leksands IF | SHL | 47 | 8 | 11 | 19 | 16 | 3 | 0 | 0 | 0 | 0 |
| 2014–15 | Leksands IF | SHL | 53 | 15 | 7 | 22 | 10 | — | — | — | — | — |
| 2015–16 | Ludvika HF | Division 2 | 1 | 1 | 2 | 3 | 0 | — | — | — | — | — |
| 2016–17 | Ludvika HF | Division 2 | 2 | 1 | 1 | 2 | 2 | — | — | — | — | — |
| 2017–18 | Smedjebacken HC | Division 3 | 2 | 2 | 0 | 2 | 0 | — | — | — | — | — |
| 2018–19 | Smedjebacken HC | Division 2 | 4 | 5 | 1 | 6 | 0 | — | — | — | — | — |
| SHL totals | | | 152 | 31 | 22 | 53 | 44 | 18 | 6 | 3 | 9 | 2 |
| Allsvenskan totals | | | 454 | 189 | 190 | 379 | 170 | 83 | 24 | 21 | 45 | 12 |
