= Kungälvs IK =

- City: Kungälv, Sweden
- League: Division 2
- Founded: 1952
- Head coach: Richard Andersson
- Website: Kungälvs IK website

Kungälvs IK is an ice-hockey club in Sweden. They play in the fourth tier of Swedish ice hockey, Division 2.

== Roster ==
updated November 27, 2013

#	Name	Position	Birth date	Birthplace
Goaltenders
1	Anton Ekberg	G	1994-02-28	Sweden
35	Axel Pietilä	G	1989-10-05	Gothenburg, Sweden
Defenceman
5	Joachim Röjdvall	D	1994-12-30	Sweden
8	Jacob Adriansson	D	1993-10-12	Sweden
15	Simon Ackeström	D	1994-11-18	Sweden
19	Hampus Söderberg	D	1990-09-14	Sweden
22	Fredrik Sjögren	D	1992-03-19	Sweden
28	Johannes Hjelm	D	1992-06-08	Sweden
44	Tom Larsson	D	1992-05-03	Sweden
56	Oscar Svärdström	D	1994-03-20	Sweden
84	Jens Andersson	D	1989-01-08	Sweden
Forwards
6	Niklas Åkesson	RW	1994-05-11	Sweden
7	James Sockander	C	1995-08-04	Sweden
9	Daniel Camermo	C	1994-03-31	Gothenburg, Sweden
13	Alexander Sjöström	RW	1993-01-10	Sweden
14	Marcus Eriksson	F	1988-11-02	Östersund, Sweden
16	Sebastian Schelin	F	1994-02-03	Sweden
17	Andreas Lindblom	LW	1992-05-16	Sweden
20	Magnus Burgren	F	1995-08-20	Sweden
24	Andreas Djuse	LW	1988-02-12	Östersund, Sweden
26	Sebastian Marcusson	C	1993-06-04	Sweden
27	Marcus Hellman	F	1990-11-04	Nynäshamn, Sweden
29	Johan Garpsäter	F	1991-04-21	Sweden
33	Anton Robertsson	RW	1994-09-30	Sweden
43	William Meander	LW	1988-01-12	Sweden
66	Jacob Martinsson	C	1993-02-11	Sweden
77	Viktor Gustafsson Spång	RW	1991-03-31	Gothenburg, Sweden
83	Arwid Johansson	C/LW	1993-10-09	Sweden

== Season-by-season record ==
record since 1998-99

Season	League	GP	W	T	L	OTW	OTL	Pts	GF	GA	Finish	Playoffs
1998-99	Division 3	16	15	0	1	-	-	140	40	30	1st	-
1999-00	Division 1	18	6	2	10	-	-	61	88	14	8th	-
2000-01	Division 1	18	0	0	18	-	-	27	128	0	10th	Relegated
2001-02	Division 2	14	8	3	3	-	-	82	36	19	2nd	-
2002-03	Division 2	26	10	5	11	-	-	93	104	25	7th	-
2003-04	Division 2	26	14	4	8	-	-	109	95	32	5th	-
2004-05	Division 2	24	13	5	6	-	-	83	55	31	5th	-
2005-06	Division 2	26	23	1	2	-	-	145	48	47	1st	Promoted
2006-07	Division 1	36	12	1	22	0	1	116	170	38	7th	-
	Division 1 Continuation	6	3	1	1	0	1	19	16	14	5th	-
2007-08	Division 1	27	9	3	11	2	2	80	83	36	7th	-
	Division 1 Continuation	10	5	1	4	0	0	35	27	20	4th	-
2008-09	Division 1	27	14	-	7	3	3	94	66	51	3rd	-
	Division 1 Continuation	14	0	-	13	0	1	23	61	1	8th	-
2009-10	Division 1	27	1	-	23	3	0	58	132	9	10th	-
	Division 1 Continuation	10	3	-	6	0	1	30	40	10	6th	Qualified for Kvalserien
	Kvalserien	8	6	-	1	1	0	33	15	20	1st	Saved from Relegation
2010-11	Division 1	27	14	-	13	0	0	86	79	42	5th	-
	Division 1 Continuation	10	5	-	4	0	1	33	32	24	2nd	-
2011-12	Division 1	27	5	-	19	1	2	53	118	19	9th	-
	Division 1 Continuation	15	3	-	8	2	2	30	46	16	6th	Qualified for Kvalserien
	Kvalserien	8	6	-	1	1	0	34	20	20	1st	Saved from Relegation
2012-13	Division 1	30	3	-	22	3	2	54	116	17	11th	-
	Division 1 Continuation	12	4	-	5	2	1	24	30	17	6th	Qualified for Kvalserien
	Kvalserien	10	6	-	2	1	1	23	16	21	3rd	Relegated
