= Marcus Weinstock =

Swedish ice hockey player

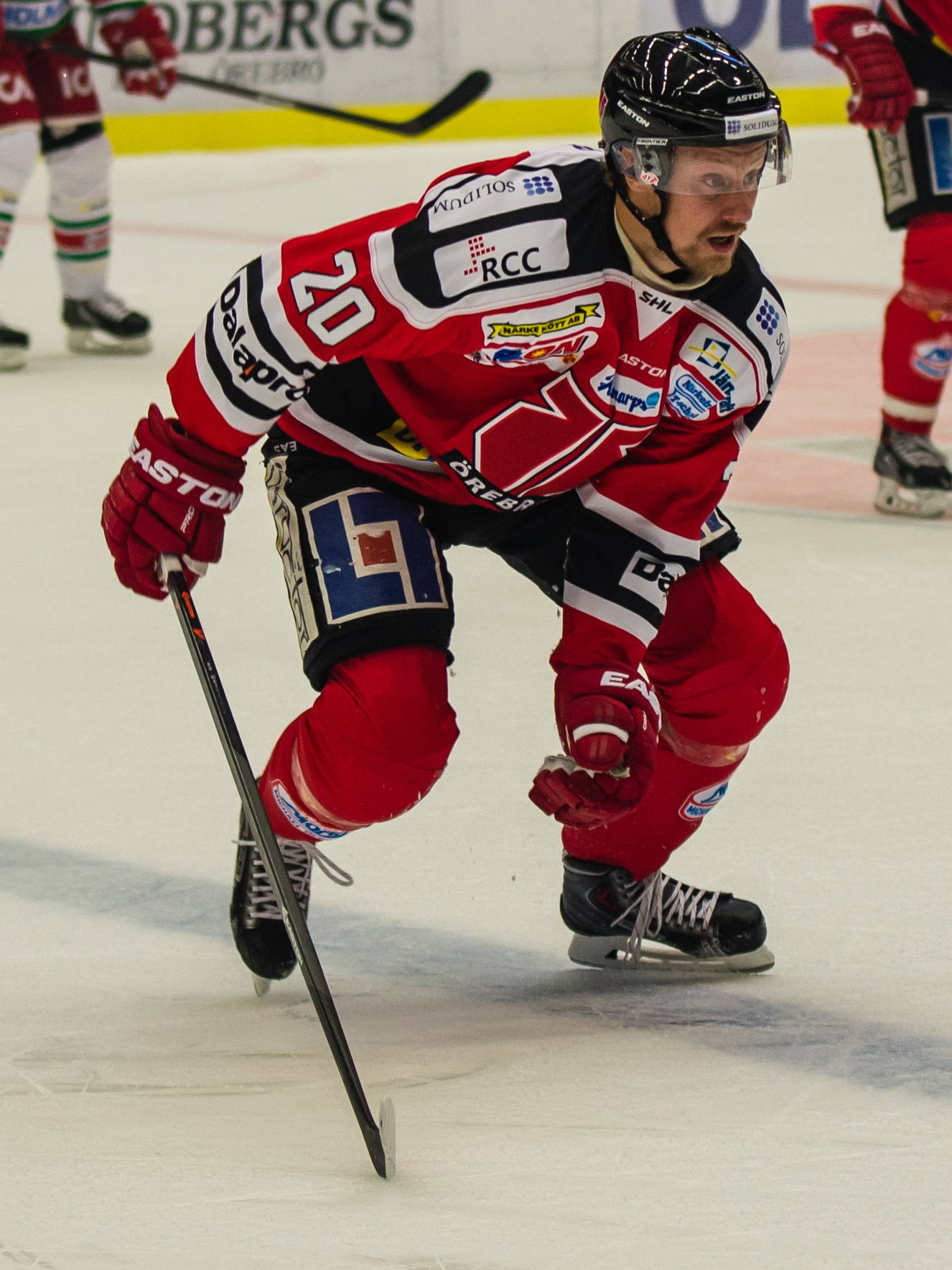
- Weinstock in 2013
- Born: 15 February 1984 (age 41); Varberg, Sweden
- Height: 6 ft 1 in (185 cm)
- Weight: 192 lb (87 kg; 13 st 10 lb)
- Position: Forward
- Shot: Left
- Played for: Färjestad BK; Örebro HK
- Playing career: 2003–2020

Marcus Weinstock (born 15 February 1984) is a Swedish former professional ice hockey forward. He most notably played for Örebro HK in the Swedish Hockey League (SHL).

== Playing career ==
Weinstock came to Färjestads BK as a junior. After playing for the club's junior team he was loaned out to second league club Bofors IK in 2003. He played with Bofors until the 2005–06 season when Bofors no longer wanted him. Instead, Färjestad loaned him to IFK Arboga, where Weinstock's uncle, Ulf Weinstock, was the coach. Weinstock played very well while with Arboga, scoring 15 points in 20 games. During the 2005–06 season he also played one game with Färjestads BK in Elitserien.

Before the 2006–07 season, he signed with Allsvenskan club Växjö Lakers. He stayed there for two seasons before signing with Leksands IF before the 2008–09 season. Since the 2010–11 season he has played for Örebro HK, helping the club secure their status from the Allsvenskan to the SHL.

In his tenth season with Örebro HK, Weinstock served as an alternate captain posting 6 goals and 14 points in 46 games, before the remainder of the 2019–20 season was cancelled due to the COVID-19 pandemic. The abrupt finish to the season ended his 17-year professional playing career, opting to remain with Örebro HK as the new Talent Developer and Head Coach at the U16 level on 1 June 2020.

== Career statistics ==
			Regular season					Playoffs
Season	Team	League	GP	G	A	Pts	PIM	GP	G	A	Pts	PIM
2003–04	Skåre BK	Div.1	4	8	5	13	4	—	—	—	—	—
2003–04	Bofors IK	Allsv	25	2	2	4	0	5	0	0	0	0
2004–05	Bofors IK	Allsv	46	6	8	14	43	5	1	0	1	0
2005–06	Bofors IK	Allsv	22	3	1	4	12	—	—	—	—	—
2005–06	Färjestad BK	SEL	1	0	0	0	0	—	—	—	—	—
2005–06	IFK Arboga	Allsv	20	7	8	15	22	—	—	—	—	—
2006–07	Växjö Lakers	Allsv	45	14	16	30	46	3	1	1	2	6
2007–08	Växjö Lakers	Allsv	45	12	21	33	38	3	1	1	2	6
2008–09	Leksands IF	Allsv	39	8	23	31	14	—	—	—	—	—
2008–09	Huddinge IK	Allsv	5	3	4	7	0	—	—	—	—	—
2009–10	Leksands IF	Allsv	52	8	22	30	63	7	0	0	0	0
2010–11	Örebro HK	Allsv	46	10	15	25	42	10	1	2	3	12
2011–12	Örebro HK	Allsv	52	18	29	47	26	10	3	2	5	8
2012–13	Örebro HK	Allsv	52	21	22	43	50	16	8	13	21	8
2013–14	Örebro HK	SHL	54	6	13	19	35	—	—	—	—	—
2014–15	Örebro HK	SHL	55	8	15	23	20	6	1	4	5	4
2015–16	Örebro HK	SHL	52	5	16	21	16	2	0	0	0	0
2016–17	Örebro HK	SHL	52	7	23	30	30	—	—	—	—	—
2017–18	Örebro HK	SHL	52	11	16	27	10	—	—	—	—	—
2018–19	Örebro HK	SHL	46	7	13	20	45	2	0	1	1	2
2019–20	Örebro HK	SHL	46	6	8	14	37	—	—	—	—	—
SHL totals			358	50	104	154	193	10	1	5	6	6
