= Örebro HK =

- City: Örebro, Sweden
- League: Swedish Hockey League
- Founded: 1990
- Home arena: Behrn Arena (capacity: 5,500)
- Colors
- General manager: Henrik Löwdahl
- Head coach: Niklas Eriksson
- Captain: Glenn Gustafsson
- Website: orebrohockey.se

Franchise history
- 1990–2005: HC Örebro 90
- 2005–present: Örebro HK

Örebro Hockeyklubb, commonly referred to as Örebro HK or Örebro Hockey, (formerly HC Örebro 90) is a Swedish professional ice hockey club located in Örebro. The team is currently playing in the Swedish Hockey League (SHL; formerly Elitserien), the top tier of Swedish ice hockey, since the 2013–14 season. The team's home arena is Behrn Arena, which seats 5,500 spectators.

== History ==
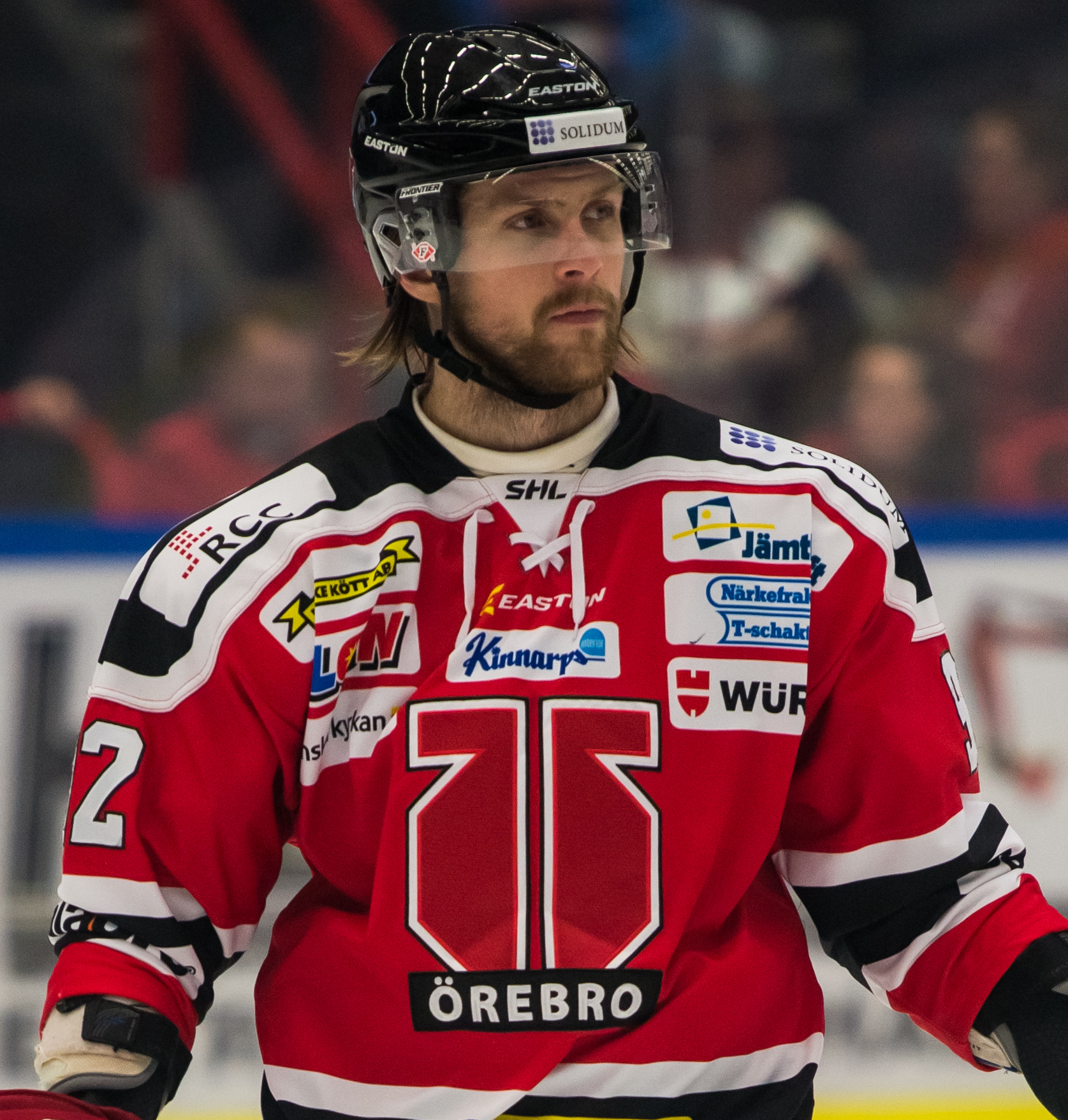
Former Örebro HK player Robin Dahlstrøm in 2013.

The club was formed in 1990 as HC Örebro 90. While Örebro IK existed, HC Örebro 90's goal was to make sure that ice hockey players who didn't get a spot in Örebro IK could still play ice hockey in Örebro. Following Örebro IK's bankruptcy in 1999, several Örebro IK players moved to HC Örebro 90. The club changed its name to Örebro HK in 2005.

The team promoted to the second-tier league Allsvenskan (now HockeyAllsvenskan) in the 2000–01 season, but were relegated to Division 1 in the 2003–04 season. The team would spend five seasons in Division 1 after the relegation. The team reached the Kvalserien qualification for HockeyAllsvenskan in the 2008–09 season and successfully promoted back to HockeyAllsvenskan, ending first in the Kvalserien qualification. The team finished tenth in the 2009–10 HockeyAllsvenskan season and thus missed the playoffs.

In the 2010–11 season they improved significantly, finishing third in the standings and thus reaching the 2011 Kvalserien qualification for the top-tier league Elitserien/SHL. The team ended fifth in the qualification and thus failed to promote to Elitserien that year. Two years later, in the 2013 Kvalserien, the team was promoted to the SHL. The team made their SHL debut in the 2013–14 season. It was their first SHL season in club history and the first SHL season for an Örebro club since 1978–79.

== Season-by-season record ==
Season	Level	Division	Record		Avg. home atnd.	Notes
Season	Level	Division	Position	W-OTW-OTL-L	Avg. home atnd.	Notes
This is a partial list, featuring the five most recent seasons. For a more complete list, see List of Örebro HK seasons.
2020–21	Tier 1	SHL	6th	25–4–4–19	33	
2020–21	Swedish Championship playoffs			6–3	0	Lost in Semifinals, 2–3 vs Växjö Lakers
2021–22	Tier 1	SHL	7th	20–8–5–19	4,377	
2021–22	Tier 1	Eighth-finals		2–1	5,014	Won 2–1 vs Brynäs IF
2021–22	Swedish Championship playoffs			1–4	5,257	Lost in quarterfinals, 1–4 vs Luleå HF
2022–23	Tier 1	SHL	4th	21–7–6–18	5,334	
2022–23	Swedish Championship playoffs			6–7	5,493	Lost in Semifinals, 2–4 vs Skellefteå AIK
2023–24	Tier 1	SHL	10th	14–9–7–22	5,392	
2023–24	Tier 1	Eighth-finals		1–2	5,500	Lost 1–2 vs Luleå HF
2024–25	Tier 1	SHL	9th	18–4–9–21	5,363	
2024–25	Tier 1	Eighth-finals		1–2	5,217	Lost 1–2 vs Växjö Lakers

== Players and personnel ==
=== Current roster ===
No.	Nat	Player	Pos	S/G	Age	Acquired	Birthplace
28	(Sweden)	Linus Arnesson	D	L	31	2023	Stockholm, Sweden
31	(Norway)	Jonas Arntzen	G	L	28	2019	Oslo, Norway
5	(Sweden)	Gustav Backström (A)	D	L	31	2013	Lindesberg, Sweden
6	(Sweden)	Filip Berglund	D	R	29	2022	Skellefteå, Sweden
14	(Sweden)	Liam Danielsson	RW	R	20	2024	Gävle, Sweden
1	(Sweden)	Jhonas Enroth	G	L	38	2020	Stockholm, Sweden
44	(Sweden)	Melvin Fernström	RW	R	20	2023	Bålsta, Sweden
37	(Sweden)	Glenn Gustafsson (C)	LW	L	27	2023	Stockholm, Sweden
41	(Sweden)	Theodor Hallquisth	D	R	19	2024	Täby, Sweden
89	(Sweden)	Patrik Karlkvist	RW	R	34	2024	Trosa, Sweden
11	(Finland)	Kalle Kossila	C	L	33	2024	Neuilly-sur-Seine, France
19	(United States)	Sean Malone	C	L	32	2025	Buffalo, New York, United States
7	(United States)	Luke Martin	D	R	27	2025	St. Louis, Missouri, United States
33	(Sweden)	Christopher Mastomäki	C	L	29	2017	Nacka, Sweden
9	(Sweden)	Niklas Nilsson	D	L	23	2021	Tyresö, Sweden
39	(Sweden)	Milton Oscarson	RW	L	23	2020	Örebro, Sweden
23	(Sweden)	Egor Polin	LW	R	22	2025	Pervouralsk, Russia
21	(Finland)	Patrik Puistola	RW	L	25	2024	Tampere, Finland
55	(Canada)	David Quenneville	D	R	28	2024	Edmonton, Alberta, Canada
10	(Finland)	Sampo Ranta	W	L	26	2025	Naantali, Finland
27	(Finland)	Peetro Seppälä	D	L	26	2024	Kuusankoski, Finland
12	(Norway)	Noah Steen	LW	L	22	2024	Oslo, Norway
77	(Finland)	Teemu Turunen	LW	L	30	2025	Helsinki, Finland
17	(Sweden)	William Wikman	LW	L	28	2022	Danderyd, Sweden

Updated 31 July 2025.

=== Team captains ===
- Henrik Löwdahl, 2008–16
- Viktor Ekbom, 2016–18
- Jere Sallinen, 2017–19
- Christopher Mastomäki, 2019–20
- Stefan Warg, 2020–21
- Rodrigo Ābols, 2021–23
- Glenn Gustafsson, 2023–present

=== Honored members ===
Örebro HK retired numbers
No.	Player	Position	Career	No. retirement
3	Lars Andersson	F	1974–1988	–
13	Björn Johansson	D	1971–1976, 1978–1989	–

== Club records and leaders ==
=== Scoring leaders ===
These are the top-ten point-scorers of Örebro HK since their promotion to the SHL in the 2013–14 season. Figures are updated after each completed season.

Note: Pos = Position; GP = Games played; G = Goals; A = Assists; Pts = Points; P/G = Points per game; = current Örebro HK player

Points
Player	Pos	GP	G	A	Pts	P/G
Marcus Weinstock	D	356	50	104	154	.43
Rodrigo Ābols	C	216	71	66	137	.63
Robert Leino	C	253	39	96	135	.53
Mathias Bromé	LW	176	48	80	128	.73
Martin Johansson	LW	186	60	61	121	.65
Kristian Näkyvä	D	217	30	87	117	.54
Christopher Mastomäki	C	378	37	68	105	.28
Daniel Viksten	RW	172	42	52	101	.59
Robin Kovacs	RW	121	42	49	91	.75
Emil Larsson	LW	201	47	40	87	.43

== Trophies and awards ==
=== Individual ===
Guldhjälmen

- Derek Ryan: 2014–15

Peter Forsberg Trophy

- Derek Ryan: 2014–15
