= List of Frölunda HC players =

This is a list of players who have played for Frölunda HC, including the years when the team was named Västra Frölunda IF (1944-1984) and Västra Frölunda HC (1984-2004).

== B ==
Torsten Basth, Aleksander Beliavski, Sean Bergenheim, Roger Bergman, Thommie Bergman, Kenneth Bergqvist, Peter Berndtsson, Lars Björklund, Gert Blomé, Arto Blomsten, Serge Boisvert, Jörgen Bood, Göte Boström, Per Boström, Darren Boyko, Sune Brasar, Tor Bratås, Anders Broström, Maurice Brunel, Mario Brunetta, Anders Burge, Lennart Bårman, Christian Bäckman, Peter Bäckström, Mikkel Bödker

== C ==
Gösta Caris, Ingemar Caris, Arne Carlsson, Kurt Carlsson, Leif Carlsson, Leif R Carlsson, Patrik Carlsson, Sten Carlsson, Tommy Carlsson, Willis Carlsson, Gunnar Carlstrand, Patrik Carnbäck, Martin Cibak

== D ==
Lars Dahlkvist, Lars Dahlström, Ron Davidson, Richard Demén-Willaume, Pär Djoos, Niklas Dyrén

== E ==
Hans Edlund, Pär Edlund, Lars Edström, Simon Edvinsson, Rolf Ek, Rolf Eklöf, Gösta Ekman, Peter Ekroth, Mats Ekström, Peter Elander, Kenth Elfsberg, Lars Eller, Thor Englund, Ulf Engström, Dan Enqvist, Anders Eriksson, Arne Eriksson, Birger Eriksson, Jan Eriksson, Joakim Eriksson, Karl-Erik Eriksson, Kent Eriksson, Lars Eriksson, Lennon Eriksson, Loui Eriksson, Hans Erixon, Håkan Erngren, Kimmo Eronen, Joakim Esbjörs, Jonas Esbjörs, Lars-Erik Esbjörs, Henrik Espe

== F ==
Karl Fabricius, Linus Fagemo, Nils Felldin, Robin Figren, Michael Ford, Johan Fransson, Thomas Fredlund, Anders Fröjd

== G ==
Hans-Arvid Genberg, Gunnar Gerdne, Joel Gistedt, Nils Glifberg, Nils Graf, Svante Granholm, Pål Grotnes, Björn Gustafsson, Kjell Owe Gustafsson, Mats Gustafsson, Åke Gustafsson, Christer Gustavsson, Peter Gustavsson

== H ==
Isaac Haag, Melker Hagberg, Radek Hamr, Karl-Axel Hansén, Göte Hansson, Pontus Hansson, Otakar Hascak, Henric Hedlund, Jonas Heed, Jens Hellgren, Per Helmersson, Leif Henriksson, Johan Herberts, Johan Hesslind, Mats Hjalmarsson, Pelle Hjelm, Geir Hoff, Claes Holmberg, Staffan Holmén, Alf Holmqvist, Andreas Holmqvist, Martin Holst, Kristian Huselius, Stig Hylland, Roger Hägglund, Peter Högardh, Göran Högosta, Jerk Högström, Joakim Hökegård

== I ==
Juha Ikonen, Jim Ivars

== J ==
Kari Jaako, Pat Jablonski, Jonas Jakobsen, Hannu Jalonen, Lars-Göran Janesjö, Alvar Jansson, Hans-Erik Jansson, Helge Jansson, Ulf Jansson, Marko Jantunen, Anders Johansson, Björn Johansson, Bo Johansson, Calle Johansson, Dan Johansson, Fredrik Johansson, Jan Johansson), Lars-Erik Johansson, Magnus Johansson, Mats Johansson, Mikael Johansson, Mikael Johansson, Patrik Johansson, Rune Johansson, Stefan Johansson, Sören Johansson, Ulf Johansson, Jonas Johnson, Johan Jönfeldt, Hans Jönsson, Kjell Jönsson

== K ==
Marian Kacir, Magnus Kahnberg, Erik Kakko, Tomi Kallio, Steve Kariya, Alf Karlsson, Berny Karlsson, Gunnar Karlsson, Jan Karlsson, Jens Karlsson, Lennart Karlsson, Ove Karlsson, Sebastian Karlsson, Christer Kellgren, Risto Kerminen, Stefan Ketola, Bengt Kinell, Tom Koivisto, Terho Koskela, Vladimir Kramskoj, Bertil Kristiansson, Jason Krog, Lennart Käll, Rolf Källström, Thomas Kärrbrandt

== L ==
Ulf Labraaten, Philip Larsen Stefan Larsson, Fredrik Last, Christian Lechtaler, Jonas Leetma, Markus Lehto, Åke Liljebjörn, Björn Lindberg, Göran Lindberg, Stefan Lindberg, Thomas Lindberg, Mats Lindh, Evert Lindström, Willy Lindström, Bernt Lindvall, Joni Lius, Erik Ljunggren, Per Ljusteräng, Ola Lund, Per Lundbergh, Janne Lundell, Henrik Lundin, Thomas Lundin, Henrik Lundqvist, Joel Lundqvist, Finn Lundström, Mats Lundström, Lars Erik Lundvall, Mattias Luukkonen, Stig Lövqvist

== M ==
Morten Madsen, Trond Magnussen, Gösta Magnusson, Henrik Malmström, Dejan Matejic, John McNamara, Thomas Mellor, Johan Mellström, Emil Meszaros, Kjell-Rune Milton, Åke Moberg, Stig Modig, Dan Mohlin, Carl-Fredrik Montan, Darwin Mott, Morris Mott, Jere Myllyniemi, Tuukka Mäntylä

== N ==
John Newberry, Antti-Jussi Niemi, Mattias Nilimaa, Göran Nilsson, Henrik Nilsson, Leif Nilsson, Per Nilsson, Peter Nilsson, Petter Nilsson, Ulf Nilsson, Håkan Nordin, Robert Nordmark, Bertil Nordström, Fredrik Norlin, Fredrik Norrena, Håkan Norström, Petteri Nummelin, Kai Nurminen, Stig Nylén, Stefan Nyman, David Nyström, Gert Nyström

== O ==
Johnny Oduya, Eine Ohlsson, Mikael Oksanen, Walter Olds, Kurt Olofsson, Jan Olsén, Christer Olsson, Göran Olsson, Kalle Olsson, Magnus Olsson, Roger Olsson

== P ==
Seppo Pakola, Jörgen Palm, Ville Peltonen, Benno Persson, Jerry Persson, Linus Persson, Mikael Persson, Rolf Persson, Tommy Persson, Lars Peterson, Jörgen Pettersson, Kjell-Ronnie Pettersson, Peter Pettersson, Ronald Pettersson, Timmy Pettersson, Tomi Pettinen, Michel Picard, Lasse Pirjetä, Martin Plüss, Mathias Porseland, Pelle Prestberg, Samuel Påhlsson

== R ==
Nicklas Rahm, Robin Rahm, Tomas Rask, Veinö Rikkinen, Anders Roddar, Lennart Roslund, Sven-Åke Rudby, Christian Ruuttu, Clifton John Ryan, Anders Rybrink, Jan Ryde, Johan Ryno, Petter Rönnqvist

== S ==
Pasi Saarela, Robin Sadler, Jorma Salmi, Sami Salo, Tommy Salo, Mikael Samuelsson, Mikael Sandberg, Ulrik Sanne, Åke Schön, Markus Seikola, Teemu Sillanpää, Reid Simonton, Arto Sirviö, Lars-Erik Sjöberg, Thomas Sjögren, Bengt Sjöholm, Fredrik Sjöström, Hasse Sjöö, Rolf Skog, Per-Åge Skrøder, Pasi Sormunen, Martin Spångberg, Kirill Starkov, Alexander Steen, Folke Stenberg, Krister Sterner, Owe Sterner, Ulf Sterner, Daniel Ström, Peter Ström, Roger Ström, Gunnar Strömberg, Christer Ståhl, Per-Inge Sundin, Ronnie Sundin, Magnus Sundqvist, Mikael Svensk, Ingmar Svensson, Lars Svensson, Stefan Svensson, Jan Säfström, Roland Särnholm, Toni Söderholm, Patrik Söderkvist, Bert Söderlind, Richard Söhrman

== T ==
Erik Thelander, Mikael Tjälldén, Jari Tolsa, Arto Tukio, Risto Tuomi, Alexander Täng, Nils Törnblom

== V ==
Ari Vallin

== W ==
Sven-Olof Wahlberg, Lars Wallin, Lennart Warberg, Ulf Weinstock, Benny Westblom, Jan Wickberg, Ulf Wikgren, Lars-Göran Wiklander, Jan Wikström, Johan Witehall

== Y ==
David Ytfeldt

== Z ==
Patrik Zackrisson, Fredrik von Zweigbergk

== Å ==
Patric Åberg, Peter Ådeby, Thomas Åhman, Daniel Åhsberg, Roger Åhsberg

== Ö ==
Sune Ödling, Roger Öhman, Per Anders Örtendahl

== Player nationalities ==
	Country	Players
(Sweden)	Sweden	343
(Finland)	Finland	35
(Canada)	Canada	15
(United States)	United States	4
(Denmark)	Denmark	4
(Norway)	Norway	3
(Russia)	Russia	2
(Slovakia)	Slovakia	2
(Latvia)	Latvia	1
(Switzerland)	Switzerland	1
(Czech Republic)	Czech Republic	1
	Total	411
