= Knight of the Rink =

- Native name: Rinkens riddare
- Type: ice hockey award
- Awarded for: sportsmanship
- Country: Sweden
- First award: 1963

The Knight of the Rink (Swedish: Rinkens riddare) is awarded to the most gentlemanly individual of the Swedish Hockey League (SHL). It was first awarded in 1962. From 1978-1997, the award was not given out, and it started up again in 1998.

== Winners ==
Season	Player	Club
1962–63	Hans Öberg	Gävle GIK
1963–64	Sven Tumba	Djurgårdens IF
1964–65	Lars-Eric Lundvall	Västra Frölunda IF
1965–66	Roland Stoltz	Djurgårdens IF
1966–67	Nils Nilsson	Leksands IF
1967–68	Leif Holmqvist	AIK
1968–69	Lars Bylund	Brynäs IF
1969–70	Håkan Wickberg	Brynäs IF
1970–71	Nils Johansson	Färjestad BK
1971–72	Jan-Erik Lyck	Brynäs IF
1972–73	Lars-Erik Sjöberg	Västra Frölunda IF
1973–74	Ulf Mårtensson	Leksands IF
1974–75	Olle Åhman	Timrå IK
1975–76	Kent-Erik Andersson	Färjestad BK
1976–77	Per-Olov Brasar	Leksands IF
1977–78	Stig Larsson	Djurgårdens IF
1997–98	Patric Kjellberg	Djurgårdens IF
1998–99	Frantisek Kaberle	Modo Hockey
1999–00	Mats Lindberg	AIK
2000–01	Mikael Johansson	Djurgårdens IF
2001–02	Mattias Weinhandl	Modo Hockey
2002–03	Johan Davidsson	HV71
2003–04	Johan Davidsson	HV71
2004–05	Johan Davidsson	HV71
2005–06	Fredrik Bremberg	Djurgårdens IF
2006–07	Anders Söderberg	Skellefteå AIK
2007–08	Kenny Jönsson	Rögle BK
2008–09	Jörgen Jönsson	Färjestad BK
2009–10	Referee Wolmer Edqvist	Grums
2010–11	Andreas Dackell	Brynäs IF
2011–12	Jakob Silfverberg	Brynäs IF
2012–13	Jesper Fast	HV71
2013–14	Oscar Möller	Skellefteå AIK
2014–15	Chairman Johan Köhler	Kiruna IF
2015–16	Daniel Viksten	Örebro HK
2016–17	Martin Thörnberg	HV71
2017–18	Jonathan Dahlén	Timrå IK
2018–19	Markus Ljungh	HV71
2019–20	Not awarded due to Covid-19	
2020–21	Oscar Möller	Skellefteå AIK
2021–22	Erik Gustafsson	Luleå HF
2022–23	Joel Persson	Växjö Lakers
2023–24	Pontus Näsén	Modo Hockey
2024–25	Jakob Silfverberg	Brynäs IF
