= Lars-Erik Sjöberg =

Swedish ice hockey player

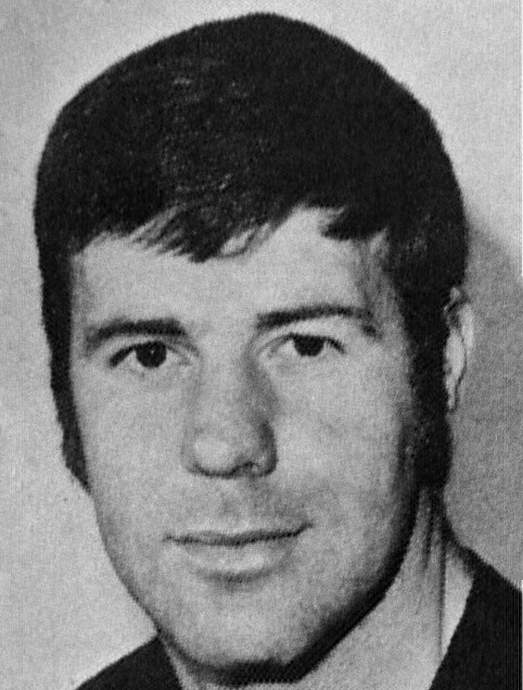
- Born: 4 May 1944 Falun, Sweden
- Died: 20 October 1987 (aged 43) Uppsala, Sweden
- Height: 5 ft 8 in (173 cm)
- Weight: 179 lb (81 kg; 12 st 11 lb)
- Position: Defense
- Shot: Left
- Played for: Leksands IF; Djurgårdens IF Hockey; Västra Frölunda IF; Winnipeg Jets
- National team: Sweden
- Playing career: 1962–1980
Medal record
Representing Sweden
Ice hockey
World Championships
| Silver medal – second place | 1969 Sweden |
| Silver medal – second place | 1970 Sweden |
| Silver medal – second place | 1973 Soviet Union |
| Bronze medal – third place | 1971 Switzerland |

Lars-Erik "Taxen" Sjöberg (4 May 1944 – 20 October 1987) was a Swedish ice hockey defenceman. He played in Sweden from 1962 to 1974 (Leksands IF 1962–1965 and 1967–1969, Djurgårdens IF Hockey 1965–1967, and Västra Frölunda IF 1969–1974), and in North America for the Winnipeg Jets in the WHA and NHL from 1974 to 1980.

Sjöberg won the Golden Puck as the Swedish player of the Year in 1968–69 and was named best defenceman at the 1974 World Ice Hockey Championships. He was the first non-North American born and raised captain in the NHL, wearing the "C" for the Winnipeg Jets during their first season in the NHL. He was nicknamed "The Professor" and "The Little General" while playing for the Jets. Sjöberg captained the Swedish national team at the 1976 Canada Cup.

Sjöberg was working as a scout for the New York Rangers when he died of cancer in 1987. To honour him the Rangers each year gives out the Lars-Erik Sjöberg Award to the best rookie in the training camp.

== Career statistics ==
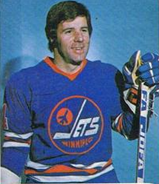
Sjöberg in 1975-76 season for Winnipeg

=== Regular season and playoffs ===
| | | | Regular season | | | | | Playoffs |
| Season | Team | League | GP | G | A | Pts | PIM | GP | G | A | Pts | PIM |
|---|---|---|---|---|---|---|---|---|---|---|---|---|
| 1962–63 | Leksands IF | SWE | 6 | 1 | 0 | 1 | 0 | — | — | — | — | — |
| 1963–64 | Leksands IF | SWE | 14 | 0 | 2 | 2 | 2 | 7 | 1 | 1 | 2 | 0 |
| 1964–65 | Leksands IF | SWE | 14 | 1 | 2 | 3 | 2 | 14 | 0 | 1 | 1 | 4 |
| 1965–66 | Djurgårdens IF | SWE | 20 | 1 | 3 | 4 | 0 | 3 | 0 | 1 | 1 | 0 |
| 1966–67 | Djurgårdens IF | SWE | 21 | 4 | 7 | 11 | 2 | 3 | 0 | 1 | 1 | 0 |
| 1967–68 | Leksands IF | SWE | 21 | 3 | 3 | 6 | — | 7 | 1 | 3 | 4 | 2 |
| 1968–69 | Leksands IF | SWE | 19 | 6 | 2 | 8 | 4 | 7 | 0 | 1 | 1 | 0 |
| 1969–70 | Västra Frölunda IF | SWE | 14 | 2 | 1 | 3 | 10 | — | — | — | — | — |
| 1970–71 | Västra Frölunda IF | SWE | 13 | 8 | 4 | 12 | 6 | — | — | — | — | — |
| 1971–72 | Västra Frölunda IF | SWE | 27 | 4 | 11 | 15 | 4 | — | — | — | — | — |
| 1972–73 | Västra Frölunda IF | SWE | 14 | 1 | 6 | 7 | 0 | — | — | — | — | — |
| 1973–74 | Västra Frölunda IF | SWE | 41 | 4 | 35 | 39 | 21 | — | — | — | — | — |
| 1974–75 | Winnipeg Jets | WHA | 75 | 7 | 53 | 60 | 30 | — | — | — | — | — |
| 1975–76 | Winnipeg Jets | WHA | 81 | 5 | 36 | 41 | 12 | 13 | 0 | 5 | 5 | 12 |
| 1976–77 | Winnipeg Jets | WHA | 52 | 2 | 38 | 40 | 31 | 20 | 0 | 6 | 6 | 22 |
| 1977–78 | Winnipeg Jets | WHA | 78 | 11 | 39 | 50 | 72 | 9 | 0 | 9 | 9 | 4 |
| 1978–79 | Winnipeg Jets | WHA | 9 | 0 | 3 | 3 | 2 | 10 | 1 | 2 | 3 | 4 |
| 1979–80 | Winnipeg Jets | NHL | 79 | 7 | 27 | 34 | 48 | — | — | — | — | — |
| SWE totals | | | 224 | 35 | 76 | 111 | 51 | 41 | 2 | 8 | 10 | 6 |
| WHA totals | | | 295 | 25 | 169 | 194 | 147 | 52 | 1 | 22 | 23 | 42 |

=== International ===
| Year | Team | Event | GP | G | A | Pts | PIM |
|---|---|---|---|---|---|---|---|
| 1968 | Sweden | OLY | 7 | 0 | 0 | 0 | 4 |
| 1969 | Sweden | WC | 9 | 3 | 2 | 5 | 2 |
| 1970 | Sweden | WC | 10 | 1 | 1 | 2 | 0 |
| 1972 | Sweden | OLY | 6 | 1 | 1 | 2 | 2 |
| 1972 | Sweden | WC | 10 | 1 | 1 | 2 | 0 |
| 1973 | Sweden | WC | 10 | 1 | 2 | 3 | 2 |
| 1974 | Sweden | WC | 9 | 1 | 0 | 1 | 2 |
| 1976 | Sweden | CC | 5 | 0 | 3 | 3 | 6 |
| Senior totals | | | 66 | 8 | 10 | 18 | 18 |

== Awards and achievements ==
- Swedish Player of the Year (1969)
- World Championship All-Star Team (1974)
- Named Best Defenseman at World Championship (1974)
- Played in the Canada Cup (1976)
- Avco Cup (WHA) Championships (1976, 1978, 1979)
- WHA First All-Star Team (1978)
- Dennis A. Murphy Trophy Winner (1978)
- "Honoured Member" of the Manitoba Hockey Hall of Fame
- Inaugural member of the World Hockey Association Hall of Fame

| Preceded by Barry Long | Winnipeg Jets captain 1979–1980 | Succeeded by Morris Lukowich |
| Preceded by Dan Johnson | Winnipeg Jets captain 1975–1978 | Succeeded by Barry Long |
| Preceded by Leif Holmqvist | Guldpucken; 1969 | Succeeded by Leif Holmqvist |
