= Ulf Sterner =

Swedish ice hockey forward

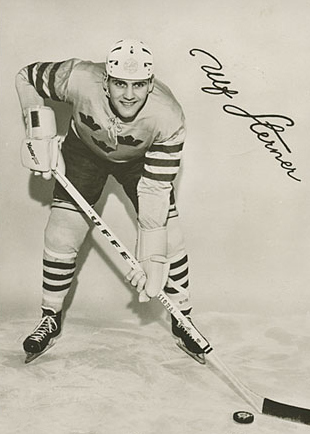
- Ulf Sterner in the early 1960s
- Born: 11 February 1941 (age 85) Deje, Sweden
- Height: 6 ft 2 in (188 cm)
- Weight: 187 lb (85 kg; 13 st 5 lb)
- Position: Left wing
- Shot: Left
- Played for: Forshaga IF; Västra Frölunda HC; New York Rangers; Rögle BK; Färjestad BK; London Lions
- National team: Sweden
- Playing career: 1956–1990

Ulf Ivar Erik Sterner (born 11 February 1941) is a Swedish former professional ice hockey forward. He played in nine IIHF World Championships for Sweden, where the team won seven medals: one gold, five silver, and one bronze. He was also a member of the silver medal team at the 1964 Winter Olympics. Sterner played for Forshaga IF from 1956 to 1961, Västra Frölunda IF from 1961 to 1964, and for the New York Rangers in 1964–65, before returning to Sweden to play for Rögle BK and Färjestads BK. He finished his career in England with the London Lions in 1973–74. On 27 January 1965, he became the first European-trained player to play in the National Hockey League (NHL). He was inducted into the IIHF Hall of Fame in 2001.

== Playing career ==
Sterner made his hockey debut at 15 when he was accepted onto a second-division club where he made a name for himself with his speed and scoring ability. On 12 November 1959, he made his international debut with Tre Kronor in a friendly match against Czechoslovakia's team. He scored his first goal in that game, which Tre Kronor won 11–3. He was the team's youngest player of all time. Through the late 1950s and early 1960s, he was one of Sweden's most popular players. He is also credited with inventing the "stick to skate to stick" maneuver. At the 1962 World Ice Hockey Championships, Sterner scored what he described as his most memorable goal when he scored the 3–0 goal against Team Canada. His team won the game 5–3 and took the gold medal. At the 1963 World Championship, he scored a hat trick against Canada in a 4–1 win. After the game, he and teammate Sven "Tumba" Johansson met King Gustaf VI Adolf and received a royal congratulations.

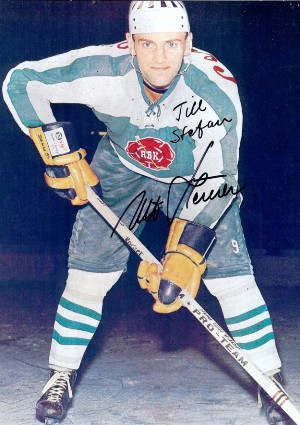
Sterner with Rögle BK

His first Olympics came in 1960 in Squaw Valley. The team did not earn a medal, but from that point on he was a dominating centre in international play. By 1963, the New York Rangers had taken interest, and in October, Sterner made the trip for training camp. The parties signed a five-game tryout agreement, but Sterner declined to play that season to conserve his amateur status for the 1964 Winter Olympics. The Swedish Olympic hockey team won a silver medal, and Sterner then attended the NY Rangers training camp in 1964 where he displayed excellent skills. However, the NHL, unlike the International Ice Hockey Federation (IIHF), permitted hitting and physical play on any point of the ice; international players were not allowed to hit in the offensive zone. Allowing him time to adjust to the North American game, the Rangers offered him a start with the St. Paul Rangers of the Central League, which he accepted. After two months, he had adapted to the different style of play and was promoted to the Baltimore Clippers of the American Hockey League. Finally, on 27 January 1965, he joined the Rangers in a game against the Boston Bruins, becoming the first European to play in the NHL.

Ultimately, Sterner played only four games in the NHL, and he did not register a point although Rangers coach Red Sullivan praised Sterner for his puckhandling skills. But he had been reluctant to play physically or to instigate physical play. He was sent back down to the AHL, and it soon became clear that he was not willing to return to the NHL for the 1965-66 season although he had signed a two-year contract. As much as his skills carried him through games in the AHL, he simply did not have the training to play 60-minute games with full contact. In 1969, the IIHF adopted the same body-checking rules as the NHL, and four years later, Börje Salming joined the Toronto Maple Leafs, ending up playing 17 years in the NHL. Eight years after leaving the Rangers, Sterner and the Swedish national team finally faced the best Canadian NHL players in two exhibition games in Stockholm that were part of Team Canada's preparation for the Summit Series against the USSR. On 16 September 1972, Sterner scored against Canada as the Swedes only narrowly lost the game. He was offered a contract by the Chicago Cougars of the rival World Hockey Association but declined the offer.

== Personal life ==
Sterner, his wife Pia, and their family currently live on a farm near Karlstad, where they keep four horses. He nicknames his horses after former teammates and friends; when one of the horses smashed his nose, he nicknamed it Alexander Ragulin.

In March 2025, Nya Wermlands Tidningen announced that he has Alzheimer's disease.

== Statistics ==
=== Regular season and playoffs ===
			Regular season					Playoffs
Season	Team	League	GP	G	A	Pts	PIM	GP	G	A	Pts	PIM
1956–57	Forshaga IF	SWE	7	3	0	3	—	—	—	—	—	—
1957–58	Forshaga IF	SWE	14	2	0	2	—	—	—	—	—	—
1958–59	Forshaga IF	SWE	11	7	8	15	—	—	—	—	—	—
1959–60	Forshaga IF	SWE	14	17	6	23	14	—	—	—	—	—
1960–61	Forshaga IF	SWE	13	14	8	22	2	—	—	—	—	—
1961–62	Västra Frölunda IF	SWE	13	12	9	21	26	7	6	4	10	5
1962–63	Västra Frölunda IF	SWE	14	14	6	20	6	7	7	4	11	0
1963–64	Västra Frölunda IF	SWE	12	10	2	12	6	7	1	4	5	10
1964–65	New York Rangers	NHL	4	0	0	0	0	—	—	—	—	—
1964–65	St. Paul Rangers	CPHL	16	12	9	21	2	—	—	—	—	—
1964–65	Baltimore Clippers	AHL	52	18	26	44	12	5	1	0	1	2
1965–66	Rögle BK	SWE.2	15	32	11	43	—	6	12	3	15	—
1966–67	Rögle BK	SWE	19	4	11	15	11	—	—	—	—	—
1967–68	Färjestad BK	SWE	21	16	8	24	19	—	—	—	—	—
1968–69	Västra Frölunda IF	SWE	19	19	20	39	10	7	5	7	12	2
1969–70	Färjestad BK	SWE.2	17	14	22	36	—	5	4	3	7	2
1970–71	Färjestad BK	SWE	6	4	7	11	13	14	10	3	13	14
1971–72	Färjestad BK	SWE	14	10	15	25	28	14	5	6	11	24
1972–73	Färjestad BK	SWE	14	7	15	22	23	14	10	2	12	29
1973–74	London Lions	GBR	64	27	88	115	71	2	0	2	2	0
1974–75	BK Bäcken	SWE.3	22	14	30	44	63	—	—	—	—	—
1975–76	BK Bäcken	SWE.2	22	17	23	40	31	—	—	—	—	—
1976–77	BK Bäcken	SWE.2	24	14	24	38	—	—	—	—	—	—
1977–78	Vänersborgs HC	SWE.3	15	17	16	33	—	—	—	—	—	—
1988–89	Hammarö HC	SWE.3	—	—	—	—	—	—	—	—	—	—
1989–90	Hammarö HC	SWE.3	1	0	0	0	0	—	—	—	—	—
SWE.2 totals			78	77	80	157	20	11	15	7	22	2
SWE totals			191	139	115	254	158	70	44	30	74	84
NHL totals			4	0	0	0	0	—	—	—	—	—

=== International ===
Ulf Sterner
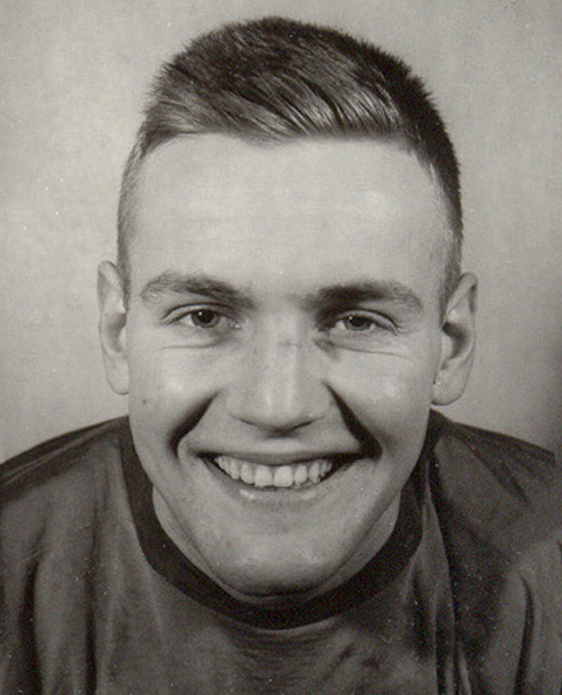

Medal record

Representing Sweden

Men's ice hockey

World Championships
Gold medal – first place	1962 United States	
Silver medal – second place	1963 Sweden	
Silver medal – second place	1967 Austria	
Silver medal – second place	1969 Sweden	
Silver medal – second place	1970 Sweden	
Silver medal – second place	1973 Soviet Union	
Bronze medal – third place	1971 Switzerland	

Olympic Games
Silver medal – second place	1964 Innsbruck	

Year	Team	Event	GP	G	A	Pts	PIM
1960	Sweden	OLY	5	0	1	1	0
1961	Sweden	WC	7	5	0	5	2
1962	Sweden	WC	7	9	7	16	2
1963	Sweden	WC	7	7	2	9	2
1964	Sweden	OLY	7	6	5	11	0
1966	Sweden	WC	7	4	1	5	0
1967	Sweden	WC	7	2	3	5	7
1969	Sweden	WC	10	5	9	14	8
1970	Sweden	WC	10	1	7	8	7
1971	Sweden	WC	10	2	2	4	2
1973	Sweden	WC	9	5	2	7	6
Senior totals			86	46	39	85	36

=== Coaching ===
Team	Year	Regular season							
Team	Year	G	W	L	T	OTL	Pts	Win %	Finish
Bayreuth SV	1986–87	36	21	9	6	0	48	.667	3rd in 2.Bundesliga South
Munich Hedos	1987–88	36	25	10	1	0	51	.708	2nd in 2.Bundesliga South
Fuessen EV	1988–89	34	14	17	5	0	33	.458	6th in 2.Bundesliga South

== Awards ==
- Won the Golden Puck as Sweden's Player of the Year in 1962–63.
- Named the best forward at the IIHF World Championships in 1969.
- Inducted into the IIHF Hall of Fame in 2001.
- WEC-A All-Star Team (1962, 1969).

Preceded by Anders Andersson	Golden Puck; 1963	Succeeded by Nils Johansson
