= Ronnie Sundin =

Swedish ice hockey player

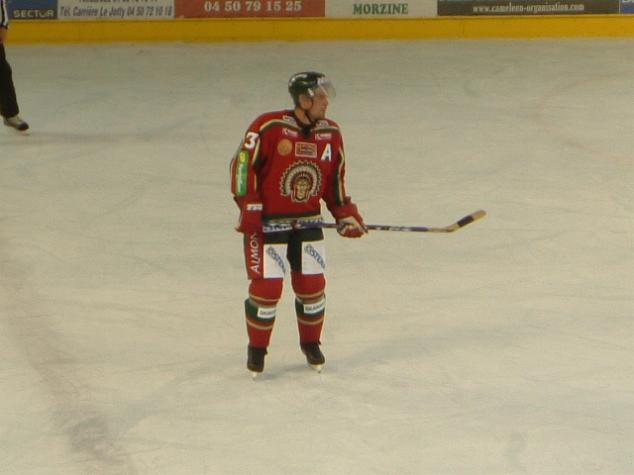
- Born: October 3, 1970 (age 55) Ludvika, Sweden
- Height: 6 ft 1 in (185 cm)
- Weight: 220 lb (100 kg; 15 st 10 lb)
- Position: Defence
- Shot: Left
- Played for: Frölunda HC; Mora IK; New York Rangers; Hartford Wolf Pack
- National team: Sweden
- NHL draft: 237th overall, 1996; New York Rangers
- Playing career: 1988–2009

Ronnie Karl Sundin (born October 3, 1970) is a Swedish former professional ice hockey defenceman. He was an alternate captain for Frölunda HC in the Swedish Elite League.

== Playing career ==
Sundin started his career in his hometown team Ludvika HC. At age 18, he joined Mora IK of the Swedish 2nd division and played there for four seasons. In 1992, he joined Västra Frölunda HC of the Swedish Elite League.

Sundin was drafted 237th overall by the New York Rangers in the 1996 NHL entry draft, after a good year when he reached the Swedish Championships finals and made his debut on Team Sweden in the World Championships.

An NHL one gamer, Sundin played one game for the New York Rangers in 1997–98. He spent most of the season with the Hartford Wolf Pack in the AHL, where he helped the club reach the Calder Cup semifinals. In 1998, Sundin returned to Sweden and resumed his career with Frölunda. Sundin has won the Swedish Championships with Frölunda in 2003 and again in 2005.

Sundin has represented Sweden in the World Championships 7 times, and 1 time in the Olympic games. In 2006, he was a member of the Swedish gold medal winning teams at the Olympics and the World Championships.

Sundin became the player with most games played for Frölunda HC in the 2nd game of the Swedish Championships final on April 11, 2006, when he played his 685th game for the club. The previous record holder was Stefan Larsson.

He retired after the 2008–09 season.

== International play ==
Medal record

Representing Sweden

Olympic Games
Gold medal – first place	2006 Turin	

World Championships
Gold medal – first place	2006 Riga	
Silver medal – second place	1997 Helsinki	
Silver medal – second place	2003 Helsinki	
Silver medal – second place	2004 Prague	
Bronze medal – third place	2002 Gothenburg	

Played for Sweden in:

- 1996 World Championships
- 1997 World Championships (silver medal)
- 2002 World Championships (bronze medal)
- 2003 World Championships (silver medal)
- 2004 World Championships (silver medal)
- 2005 World Championships
- 2006 Winter Olympics (gold medal)
- 2006 World Championships (gold medal)

== Career statistics ==
=== Regular season and playoffs ===
			Regular season					Playoffs
Season	Team	League	GP	G	A	Pts	PIM	GP	G	A	Pts	PIM
1986–87	Ludvika HC	SWE III	4	0	0	0	—	—	—	—	—	—
1987–88	Ludvika HC	SWE III	31	0	4	4	—	—	—	—	—	—
1988–89	Mora IK	SWE II	28	2	4	6	16	3	0	2	2	0
1989–90	Mora IK	SWE II	34	3	4	7	26	2	0	0	0	0
1990–91	Mora IK	SWE II	32	4	8	12	16	—	—	—	—	—
1991–92	Mora IK	SWE II	35	2	5	7	18	2	0	0	0	0
1992–93	Västra Frölunda HC	SEL	17	2	3	5	12	—	—	—	—	—
1992–93	Västra Frölunda HC	Allsv	17	1	3	4	8	3	0	0	0	6
1993–94	Västra Frölunda HC	SEL	38	0	9	9	42	4	0	0	0	0
1994–95	Västra Frölunda HC	SEL	11	3	4	7	6	—	—	—	—	—
1994–95	Västra Frölunda HC	Allsv	17	2	6	8	24	5	0	1	1	4
1995–96	Västra Frölunda HC	SEL	40	3	6	9	18	13	1	4	5	10
1996–97	Västra Frölunda HC	SEL	47	3	14	17	24	3	1	0	1	2
1997–98	New York Rangers	NHL	1	0	0	0	0	—	—	—	—	—
1997–98	Hartford Wolf Pack	AHL	67	3	19	22	59	14	2	5	7	15
1998–99	Västra Frölunda HC	SEL	50	3	5	8	26	4	0	1	1	2
1999–2000	Västra Frölunda HC	SEL	49	5	5	10	40	5	1	1	2	4
2000–01	Västra Frölunda HC	SEL	47	3	7	10	32	—	—	—	—	—
2001–02	Västra Frölunda HC	SEL	49	9	8	17	38	10	0	3	3	12
2002–03	Västra Frölunda HC	SEL	49	4	11	15	40	16	5	4	9	16
2003–04	Västra Frölunda HC	SEL	48	2	11	13	16	10	0	0	0	12
2004–05	Frölunda HC	SEL	47	9	9	18	38	14	0	4	4	16
2005–06	Frölunda HC	SEL	50	4	15	19	65	17	6	3	9	30
2006–07	Frölunda HC	SEL	55	5	9	14	60	—	—	—	—	—
2007–08	Frölunda HC	SEL	54	3	15	18	64	7	0	1	1	12
2008–09	Frölunda HC	SEL	54	3	12	15	34	11	0	4	4	8
SEL totals			705	61	143	204	555	114	14	25	39	124

=== International ===
Year	Team	Event	GP	G	A	Pts	PIM
1996	Sweden	WC	1	0	0	0	0
1997	Sweden	WC	8	0	0	0	0
2002	Sweden	WC	9	2	2	4	4
2003	Sweden	WC	9	0	4	4	4
2004	Sweden	WC	9	0	0	0	2
2005	Sweden	WC	8	2	2	4	6
2006	Sweden	OG	7	0	0	0	6
2006	Sweden	WC	9	0	3	3	12
Senior totals			61	4	11	15	34

== Records ==
- Frölunda HC club record for most games played (891)

== See also ==
- List of players who played only one game in the NHL
