= Pär Edlund =

Swedish ice hockey player (born 1967)

- Born: April 9, 1967 (age 57); Nynäshamn, Sweden
- Height: 5 ft 11 in (180 cm)
- Weight: 211 lb (96 kg; 15 st 1 lb)
- Position: Winger
- Shot: Left
- Played for: IF Björklöven; Västra Frölunda HC
- NHL draft: 30th overall, 1985; Los Angeles Kings
- Playing career: 1985–2001

Pär Edlund (born 9 April 1967) is a Swedish former professional ice hockey player. He scored five goals and six assists at the 1987 World Junior Ice Hockey Championships. He is currently a member of the coaching staff for Frölunda HC in Elitserien.

== Career statistics ==
| | | | Regular season | | | | | Playoffs |
| Season | Team | League | GP | G | A | Pts | PIM | GP | G | A | Pts | PIM |
|---|---|---|---|---|---|---|---|---|---|---|---|---|
| 1982–83 | Södertälje SK U16 | U16 SM | — | — | — | — | — | — | — | — | — | — |
| 1982–83 | Södertälje SK J18 | | — | — | — | — | — | — | — | — | — | — |
| 1983–84 | IF Björklöven J18 | J18 Elit | — | — | — | — | — | — | — | — | — | —— |
| 1983–84 | IF Björklöven J20 | Juniorserien | — | — | — | — | — | — | — | — | — | — |
| 1984–85 | IF Björklöven J18 | J18 Elit | — | — | — | — | — | — | — | — | — | — |
| 1984–85 | IF Björklöven J20 | Juniorserien | — | — | — | — | — | — | — | — | — | — |
| 1985–86 | IF Björklöven U20 | Juniorserien | — | — | — | — | — | — | — | — | — | — |
| 1985–86 | IF Björklöven | Elitserien | 6 | 1 | 0 | 1 | 2 | — | — | — | — | — |
| 1986–87 | IF Björklöven J20 | Juniorserien | — | — | — | — | — | — | — | — | — | — |
| 1986–87 | IF Björklöven | Elitserien | 4 | 0 | 0 | 0 | 0 | — | — | — | — | — |
| 1987–88 | IF Björklöven | Elitserien | 37 | 6 | 4 | 10 | 14 | 7 | 1 | 0 | 1 | 2 |
| 1988–89 | IF Björklöven | Elitserien | 22 | 10 | 2 | 12 | 26 | — | — | — | — | — |
| 1988–89 | IF Björklöven | Allsvenskan D1 | 18 | 9 | 10 | 19 | 20 | 7 | 3 | 3 | 6 | 16 |
| 1989–90 | IF Björklöven | Division 1 | 36 | 27 | 18 | 45 | 42 | 8 | 4 | 3 | 7 | 6 |
| 1990–91 | Västra Frölunda HC | Elitserien | 15 | 5 | 4 | 9 | 10 | — | — | — | — | — |
| 1990–91 | Västra Frölunda HC | Division 1 | 18 | 12 | 7 | 19 | 16 | 10 | 5 | 3 | 8 | 10 |
| 1991–92 | Västra Frölunda HC | Elitserien | 35 | 13 | 9 | 22 | 46 | 2 | 0 | 0 | 0 | 4 |
| 1992–93 | Västra Frölunda HC | Elitserien | 22 | 7 | 3 | 10 | 28 | — | — | — | — | — |
| 1992–93 | Västra Frölunda HC | Allsvenskan D1 | 3 | 1 | 0 | 1 | 2 | — | — | — | — | — |
| 1993–94 | Västra Frölunda HC | Elitserien | 38 | 5 | 5 | 10 | 40 | 4 | 0 | 1 | 1 | 10 |
| 1994–95 | Västra Frölunda HC | Elitserien | 22 | 1 | 2 | 3 | 18 | — | — | — | — | — |
| 1994–95 | Västra Frölunda HC | Allsvenskan D1 | 18 | 9 | 7 | 16 | 12 | 2 | 1 | 0 | 1 | 0 |
| 1995–96 | Västra Frölunda HC | Elitserien | 37 | 12 | 10 | 22 | 55 | 13 | 3 | 1 | 4 | 12 |
| 1996–97 | Västra Frölunda HC | Elitserien | 40 | 3 | 3 | 6 | 44 | 3 | 1 | 0 | 1 | 2 |
| 1997–98 | Västra Frölunda HC | Elitserien | 44 | 1 | 2 | 3 | 30 | 7 | 1 | 0 | 1 | 10 |
| 1998–99 | Västra Frölunda HC | Elitserien | 49 | 5 | 7 | 12 | 64 | 4 | 0 | 0 | 0 | 8 |
| 1999–00 | Västra Frölunda HC | Elitserien | 44 | 4 | 5 | 9 | 46 | 5 | 0 | 1 | 1 | 28 |
| 2000–01 | Västra Frölunda HC | Elitserien | 50 | 5 | 1 | 6 | 65 | 4 | 0 | 0 | 0 | 37 |
| Elitserien totals | | | 465 | 78 | 57 | 135 | 488 | 49 | 6 | 3 | 9 | 113 |
