= Janne Karlsson (ice hockey, born 1958) =

Swedish ice hockey player and coach

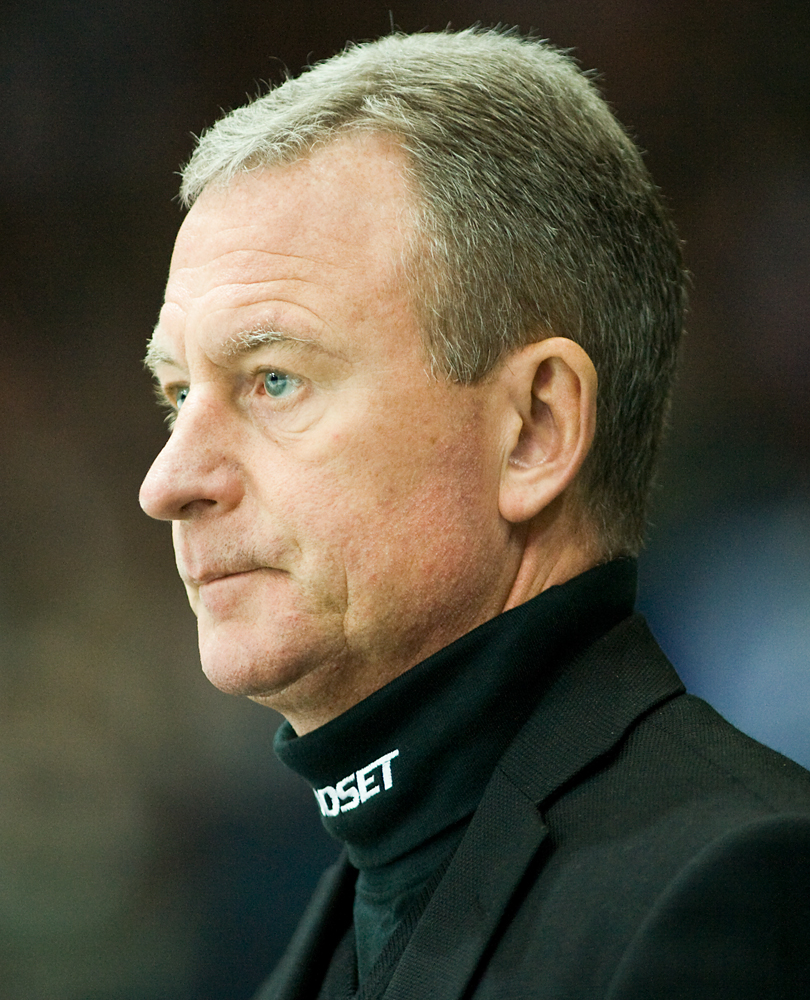
- Born: 28 September 1958 (age 66); Växjö, Sweden
- Height: 6 ft 2 in (188 cm)
- Weight: 192 lb (87 kg; 13 st 10 lb)
- Position: Defenceman
- Shot: Right
- Played for: Västra Frölunda HC; HV71
- Playing career: 1977–1993

Jan "Janne" Tordh Ingemar Karlsson (born 28 August 1958) is a Swedish professional ice hockey coach and former player. He is currently the head coach of Denmark's national icehockey team.

== Playing career ==
Karlsson played for HV71 from 1977 to 1981, for Västra Frölunda from 1981 to 1990 and for Mörrums GoIS IK from 1990 to 1993.

== Coaching career ==
After retiring as a player after the 1992–93 season, Karlsson took a coaching position with Mörrum. In 1995 he returned to Frölunda to work as a coach and manager of their youth department. He became an assistant coach for Frölunda together with Christer Kellgren under head coach Tommy Boustedt during the 1999–00 season. The following season Karlsson was the lone assistant coach to Boustedt, and he continued as assistant coach when Conny Evensson took over as head coach prior to the 2002–03 season. Together they led Frölunda to win the 2003 Swedish Championship against Färjestads BK, winning the best-of-seven finals in four games.

The following season Evensson was forced to retire due to illness and Karlsson took over as interim head coach for the rest of the season. Karlsson returned to his position as assistant coach when Stephan Lundh was hired as head coach prior to the 2004–05 season. They led Frölunda to one of the best season performances in Swedish ice hockey, culminating with the 2005 Swedish Championship finals which they won against Färjestads BK four to one in games. Lundh and Karlsson coached Frölunda to their second straight finals appearance, once again against Färjestad, this time losing two to four in games.

Karlsson, still hired by Frölunda, took a leave of absence prior to the 2006–07 season and signed a contract with Linköpings HC as assistant coach to Gunnar Persson. Persson was fired in January 2007 and Karlsson took over the job as head coach, he led Linköping to the Swedish Championship finals where they lost two games to four against Modo Hockey. The following season Karlsson led Linköping to their second straight finals appearance, where they lost to HV71 two games to four. Karlsson returned to Frölunda prior to the 2008–09 season as assistant coach to Ulf Dahlén.

Prior to the 2009–10 season Karlsson was named the head coach of HV71 of the Elitserien. He became Swedish Champion in his first season with the team, winning the regulation series, reaching and winning the finals. However, the following season, the team performed worse; although the team won the regulation series for a second consecutive year, the team surprisingly were eliminated by Elitserien newcomers AIK already in the quarter-finals, losing 4–0 in games.

After the 2010–11 season, Karlsson was sacked by HV71 and signed as assistant coach to Bengt-Åke Gustafsson in the Atlant Moscow Oblast of the Kontinental Hockey League (KHL). After a disappointing start of the 2011–12 season for Moscow Oblast, Karlsson took over the head-coaching job for the team as Gustafsson was forced to leave the club. Karlsson was fired from Atlant on 20 October 2012. He took over the head coach job of Rögle BK on 12 January 2013, as the team were last placed in the standings.

In June 2013 he was named new head coach of the Denmark's national icehockey team.

== International ==
Karlsson's debuted as a coach with Tre Kronor during the 2002–03 Euro Hockey Tour as assistant coach to Hardy Nilsson at the Baltica Brewery Cup. The following season he was assistant coach to Nilsson at the Česká Pojišťovna Cup and Moscow International Tournament. During the 2004–05 Euro Hockey Tour Karlsson was assistant coach to interim national team head coaches Bengt-Åke Gustafsson—at the Karjala Tournament—and Roger Melin—at the Sweden Hockey Games. Gustafsson was appointed permanent national team coach in February 2005 and choose Karlsson along with Tommy Boustedt and Tommy Samuelsson as assistant coaches for the 2005 World Championships, where Tre Kronor lost to Russia in the bronze medal game. In September 2005 Karlsson was announced as a permanent assistant coach to Gustafsson, he participated in all the 2005–06 Euro Hockey Tour tournaments except for the Rosno Cup.

At the 2006 Olympics Karlsson and Anders Eldebrink were assistant coaches to Gustafsson and together they led Tre Kronor to an Olympic gold medal. A few months later at the 2006 World Championships Karlsson again with Boustedt and Samuelsson were assistant coaches to Gustafsson when Sweden won their eight World Championship gold medal, becoming the first country to win both the Olympics and World Championships in the same year. During the 2006–07 Euro Hockey Tour Karlsson participated at the Česká Pojišťovna Cup, the Channel One Cup, and the Euro Hockey Tour finals which Tre Kronor won against Russia. Karlsson together with Boustedt and Samuelsson were assistant coaches to Gustafsson at the 2007 World Championship, where Tre Kronor lost to Russia in the bronze medal game. Following the World Championship Karlsson announced that he resigned from his permanent position with Tre Kronor due to his obligations as head coach of Linköping. However Karlsson returned to Tre Kronor together with Eldebrink as an assistant coaches to Gustafsson for the 2008 World Championship, where Tre Kronor lost to Finland in the bronze medal game.

== Personal life ==
Karlsson was born 28 August 1958, in Växjö but grew up in Åseda. Karlsson and his wife Carina have two children, daughter Emelie and son Robin.

While playing for HV71 Karlsson worked as a recreation leader, and while playing for Frölunda he worked as a janitor at an upper secondary school.

== Career statistics ==
=== Regular season and playoffs ===
			Regular Season					Playoffs
Season	Team	League	GP	G	A	Pts	PIM	GP	G	A	Pts	PIM
1977–78	HV71	Div. 1	18	0	0	0	0	—	—	—	—	—
1978–79	HV71	Div. 1	20	2	2	4	28	—	—	—	—	—
1979–80	HV71	SEL	34	3	4	7	14	—	—	—	—	—
1980–81	HV71	Div. 1	35	7	13	20	39	12	2	7	9	12
1981–82	Västra Frölunda IF	SEL	32	4	3	7	28	—	—	—	—	—
1982–83	Västra Frölunda IF	SEL	35	2	6	8	34	—	—	—	—	—
1983–84	Västra Frölunda IF	SEL	33	5	6	11	46	—	—	—	—	—
1984–85	Västra Frölunda HC	Div. 1	32	6	14	20	40	—	—	—	—	—
1985–86	Västra Frölunda HC	Div. 1	32	5	17	22	48	—	—	—	—	—
1986–87	Västra Frölunda HC	Div. 1	32	4	15	19	24	1	0	0	0	0
1987–88	Västra Frölunda HC	Div. 1	36	6	19	25	22	11	2	3	5	12
1988–89	Västra Frölunda HC	Div. 1	29	6	10	16	42	11	1	3	4	4
1989–90	Västra Frölunda HC	SEL	33	4	9	13	44	—	—	—	—	—
1990–91	Mörrums GoIS IK	Div. 1	31	7	14	21	28	—	—	—	—	—
1991–92	Mörrums GoIS IK	Div. 1	28	8	12	20	76	—	—	—	—	—
1992–93	Mörrums GoIS IK	Div. 1	32	11	11	22	50	3	0	1	1	2
Division 1 totals			325	62	127	189	397	38	5	14	19	30
SEL totals			167	18	28	46	166	—	—	—	—	—

Preceded by Hasse Sjöö	Frölunda HC captains 1987–1990	Succeeded by Mikael Andersson
