= Patrik Carnbäck =

Swedish ice hockey player (born 1968)

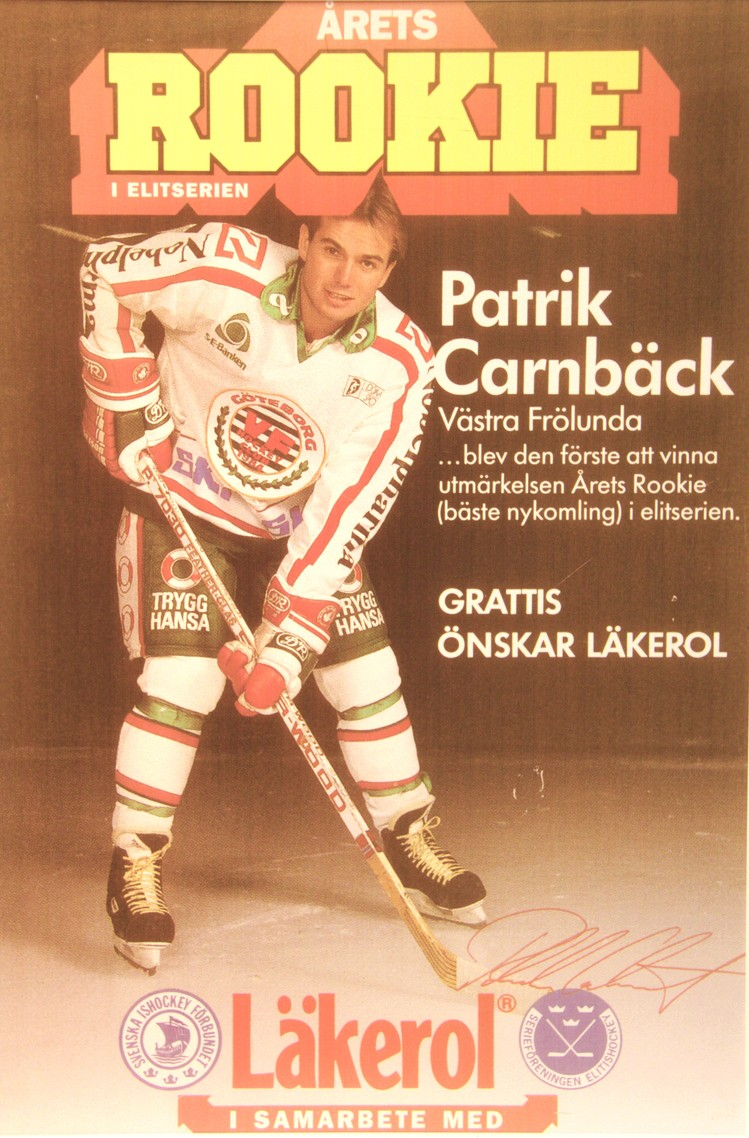
- Carnbäck as Rookie of the Year in 1989/90 SEL season
- Born: 1 February 1968 (age 58) Gothenburg, Sweden
- Height: 6 ft 0 in (183 cm)
- Weight: 192 lb (87 kg; 13 st 10 lb)
- Position: Right wing
- Shot: Left
- Played for: Västra Frölunda HC; Kölner Haie; Montreal Canadiens; Mighty Ducks of Anaheim
- National team: Sweden
- NHL draft: 125th overall, 1988; Montreal Canadiens
- Playing career: 1986–2003

Jan Patrik Carnbäck (born 1 February 1968) is a Swedish former professional ice hockey player.

== Playing career ==
Patrik started playing ice hockey at age 8, with the local club IFK Bäcken. After five years with Bäcken he joined Västra Frölunda HC. At age 17 he started playing with Frölunda's elite team, at the time in Swedish hockey's Division 1. Patrik and Frölunda played three seasons in Division 1 before advancing to Elitserien in 1989. During these three seasons, Carnbäck played 83 games, scoring 49 goals and 49 assist for a total of 98 points.

In his first season in Elitserien (1989–90), Patrik ended up second in the scoring race with a total of 54 points, as a rookie. He won Rookie of the year, voted ahead of Mats Sundin. Trailing him in the scorings race were some top notch scoring machines, Håkan Loob (53), Bengt-Åke Gustafsson (46), Peter Gradin (46), Thomas Rundqvist (46), Anders Carlsson (43) and Lars-Gunnar Pettersson (42). The only player to finish ahead of him was AIK's Robert Burakovsky with 57 points. His success in Elitserien lead to his debut with the national team in November, 1989.

In the 1992 World Championships he was one of the best players for team Sweden. He started the tournament playing with Mats Sundin and Peter Forsberg. After a disappointing tie game, 0-0, against team Italy he formed a line with newly arrived, NHL player Mikael Andersson and Daniel Rydmark. They became Sweden's new offensive weapon. In the tournament final, Carnbäck was named "best player of the game."

After his success in the World Championships and his play in Elitserien, the Montreal Canadiens decided to bring him over the pond. However, Patrik didn't manage to get a roster spot in Montreal and played most of the season with Montreal's farm team, the Fredericton Canadiens.

On August 10, 1993, Montreal traded Patrik and Todd Ewen to the Mighty Ducks of Anaheim for their 3rd round choice (Chris Murray) in the 1994 Entry Draft. He had more success in Anaheim and was a regular on the team in his first season. Halfway through his third season with the Ducks, he was loaned to Kölner Haie of the DEL.

== Awards ==
- Elitserien Rookie of the Year in 1990.
- Named to the Elitserien All-Star Team in 2000.

== Career statistics ==
=== Regular season and playoffs ===
			Regular season					Playoffs
Season	Team	League	GP	G	A	Pts	PIM	GP	G	A	Pts	PIM
1986–87	Västra Frölunda HC	SEL-2	10	3	1	4	14	—	—	—	—	—
1987–88	Västra Frölunda HC	SEL-2	33	16	19	35	24	11	4	5	9	8
1988–89	Västra Frölunda HC	SEL-2	28	18	19	37	22	11	8	5	13	10
1989–90	Västra Frölunda HC	SEL	40	27	27	54	34	—	—	—	—	—
1990–91	Västra Frölunda HC	SEL	22	10	9	19	46	—	—	—	—	—
1990–91	Västra Frölunda HC	Allsv	18	11	14	25	14	10	4	10	14	10
1991–92	Västra Frölunda HC	SEL	33	17	24	41	32	3	1	5	6	20
1992–93	Fredericton Canadiens	AHL	45	20	37	57	45	5	0	3	3	14
1992–93	Montreal Canadiens	NHL	6	0	0	0	2	—	—	—	—	—
1993–94	Mighty Ducks of Anaheim	NHL	73	12	11	23	54	—	—	—	—	—
1994–95	Västra Frölunda HC	SEL	13	2	6	8	20	—	—	—	—	—
1994–95	Västra Frölunda HC	Allsv	4	2	4	6	24	—	—	—	—	—
1994–95	Mighty Ducks of Anaheim	NHL	41	6	15	21	32	—	—	—	—	—
1995–96	Mighty Ducks of Anaheim	NHL	34	6	12	18	34	—	—	—	—	—
1995–96	Kölner Haie	DEL	5	1	6	7	2	14	8	8	16	34
1996–97	Kölner Haie	DEL	45	20	41	61	72	4	1	1	2	2
1997–98	Västra Frölunda HC	SEL	44	8	17	25	38	6	3	3	6	6
1998–99	Västra Frölunda HC	SEL	50	19	28	47	54	4	1	1	2	8
1999–2000	Västra Frölunda HC	SEL	46	17	23	40	85	5	2	0	2	31
2000–01	Västra Frölunda HC	SEL	33	7	11	18	44	5	2	3	5	12
2001–02	Västra Frölunda HC	SEL	49	15	23	38	61	10	4	1	5	8
2002–03	Västra Frölunda HC	SEL	49	12	12	24	96	16	4	5	9	8
SEL totals			379	134	180	314	510	49	17	18	35	93
NHL totals			154	24	38	62	122	—	—	—	—	—

=== International ===
Patrik Carnbäck
Medal record

Men's ice hockey

World Championships
Gold medal – first place	1992	Team
Bronze medal – third place	1994	Team

Year	Team	Event	GP	G	A	Pts	PIM
1988	Sweden	WJC	7	3	3	6	10
1992	Sweden	OG	7	1	1	2	2
1992	Sweden	WC	8	2	2	4	16
1994	Sweden	WC	8	1	0	1	8
Senior totals			23	4	3	7	26

== Notes and references ==
=== References ===
- Carlsson, Lars O. (25 December 2006). "Del 75 - Årets Rookie 1989-90". Nostalgiska Återblickar (in Swedish). Frölunda HC. Archived from the original on 26 September 2007.
- "Patrik Carnbäck – player profile". frolunda.info.se (in Swedish). Archived from the original on 27 September 2007.
- "Patrik Carnback at Legends of Hockey". Hockey Hall of Fame and Museum.
