= Leader of the Year (ice hockey) =

- Date: 1992
- Country: Sweden

The Swedish Ice Hockey Leader of the Year (Swedish: Årets Ledare) is an annual award given to the best ice hockey leader in Sweden each season. The award was first given in the 1991–92 season, and Kamratföreningen Hockeyjournalisterna is the jury which votes on the award. Swedish businessman Percy Nilsson gives out the award since 2006.

== Winners ==
- 1991–92: Percy Nilsson, Malmö Redhawks
- 1992–93: Sture Andersson, MoDo Hockey
- 1993–94: Bengt Nilsson, Huddinge IK
- 1994–95: Denny Eriksson, HV71
- 1995–96: Åke Wikman, Luleå HF
- 1996–97: Jan Simons, Mora IK
- 1997–98: Verner Persson, AIK
- 1998–99: Börje Olsson, Brynäs IF
- 1999–2000: Lennart Grevé, IF Björklöven
- 2000–01: Mats Waltin, Djurgårdens IF
- 2001–02: Håkan Loob, Färjestad BK
- 2002–03: Kent Norberg, Timrå IK
- 2003–04: Jan Simons (2), Mora IK
- 2004–05: Benny Westblom, Frölunda HC
- 2005–06: Magnus Hävelid, Linköpings HC
- 2006–07: Erik Holmberg, Modo Hockey
- 2007–08: Roger Hansson, Rögle BK
- 2008–09: Mats Hedenström, AIK
- 2009–10: Lars Johansson, Skellefteå AIK
- 2010–11: Henrik Evertsson, Växjö Lakers
- 2011–12: Björn Hellkvist, Rögle BK
- 2012–13: Lars Johansson (2), Skellefteå AIK
- 2013–14: Per Kenttä, Asplöven HC
- 2014–15: Sam Hallam, Växjö Lakers
- 2015–16: Roger Rönnberg, Frölunda HC
- 2016–17: Peter Hermodsson, Mora IK
- 2017–18: Kent Norberg (2), Timrå IK
- 2018–19: Per Kenttä (2) and Martin Åkerberg, IK Oskarshamn
- 2019–20: No award due to COVID-19
- 2020–21: Sam Hallam (2), Växjö Lakers

== See also ==
- Coach of the Year (ice hockey)
