= Göran Nilsson =

Göran Nilsson may refer to:

- Göran Nilsson (ice hockey)
- Göran Nilsson (cinematographer)
