= Robert Ohlsson =

Swedish ice hockey coach (born 1974)

- Born: December 9, 1974 (age 51) Stockholm, Sweden
- Position: Right wing
- Playing career: 1994–2005

Robert Ohlsson (born December 9, 1974) is a Swedish ice hockey head coach for Frölunda HC of the Swedish Hockey League (SHL), and formerly an ice hockey player. He won a gold medal at the 2012 World Junior Ice Hockey Championships as an assistant coach for team Sweden. He has won the Swedish Championship twice; in 2016 as assistant coach with Frölunda HC and in 2024 as head coach of Skellefteå AIK.

== Playing career ==
Ohlsson played junior ice hockey with Djurgårdens IF. For the 1994–95 season, he joined Danderyd/Täby HC in Sweden's then second-tier league Division 1—playing 25 games, scoring ten goals and 14 points. The following season, Ohlsson joined Haninge HF where he would play 83 games over three seasons, scoring 29 goals and a total of 71 points. After three seasons with Haninge, Ohlsson signed with Hammarby IF for the 1998–99 season, scoring eight goals and 21 points in 24 games. The structure of ice hockey in Sweden changed for the 1999–2000 season, the second-tier league became Allsvenskan where Ohlsson joined IK Oskarshamn, marking the first time he played for a team outside of the Stockholm area. Ohlsson had his best season production-wise, scoring twelve goals and 38 points in 40 games. In the qualification playoffs for the 2000 Kvalserien, Ohlsson scored one goal and one assist in two games; however, Oskarshamn failed to qualify, losing 0–2 in games against IF Björklöven. The following season, Ohlsson scored eleven goals and 38 points in 37 games. Oskarshamn qualified for the 2001 Kvalserien after having won 2–0 in games against Skellefteå AIK and 2–1 in games in the second round against Bodens IK. In Kvalserien, Ohlsson scored three goals and eight points in ten games, but Oskarshamn finished fifth in the standings and failed to earn a promotion to the top tier Elitserien. For the 2001–02 season Ohlsson joined local Småland rivals Tingsryds AIF, but only appeared in 23 games scoring four goals and ten points, before returning to Oskarshamn to finish the season with 13 games scoring five goals and ten points. He played another three seasons for Oskarshamn, finishing out his career with 101 games, scoring 13 goals and a total of 39 points between 2002 and 2005. Oskarshamn qualified for the 2005 Kvalserien, which would be Ohlsson's last games as a player, scoring one goal in seven games as Oskarshamn finished dead last and failed to earn promotion.

== Coaching career ==
Ohlsson started studying the coach management program at the Linnaeus University in Växjö late in his playing career. After finishing his playing career Ohlsson joined his hometown team Djurgårdens IF's under-20 team as a coach for the 2005–06 season, leading them to third-place finish of the J20 SuperElit south division with a Win–Loss–Tie (WLT) record of 13–8–2, and ultimately a semifinal loss in the playoffs. For the 2006–07 season he coached Djurgården's under-18 team, leading the team to a first-place finish in the J18 Elit east division with a 18–2–2 record, qualifying for the top continuation series the J18 Allsvenskan where Djurgården finished first in the north division with a 9–2–2 record, but were eliminated in the quarterfinals. In 2007 Ohlsson joined Sweden men's national under-18 ice hockey team as an assistant coach to Stephan Lundh, starting by winning Sweden's first ever gold at the 2007 installment of the Hlinka Gretzky Cup. Ohlsson held the position for three years, finishing his stint with the under-18 national team with a silver medal at the 2010 IIHF World U18 Championships after Sweden lost the final 1–3 against team USA. For the 2010–11 season, Ohlsson was promoted to the Sweden men's national junior ice hockey team as he joined as an assistant coach to Roger Rönnberg. At their first IIHF World Junior Championship together in 2011 Sweden finished fourth after having lost the semifinals after 3–4 after game-winning shots against Russia, and the bronze medal game 2–4 against USA.

== Career statistics ==
=== Regular season and playoffs ===
			Regular season					Playoffs
Season	Team	League	GP	G	A	Pts	PIM	GP	G	A	Pts	PIM
1993–94	Djurgårdens IF	Juniorallsvenskan	14	10	8	18	12	—	—	—	—	—
1994–95	Danderyd/Täby HC	Division 1	25	10	4	14	32	—	—	—	—	—
1995–96	Haninge HF	Division 1	31	5	10	15	40	—	—	—	—	—
1996–97	Haninge HF	Division 1	23	14	10	24	33	—	—	—	—	—
1997–98	Haninge HF	Division 1	29	10	22	32	28	—	—	—	—	—
1998–99	Hammarby IF	Division 1	24	8	13	21	6	—	—	—	—	—
1999–00	IK Oskarshamn	Allsvenskan	40	12	26	38	20	2	1	1	2	0
2000–01	IK Oskarshamn	Allsvenskan	37	11	27	38	12	10	3	5	8	4
2001–02	Tingsryds AIF	Allsvenskan	23	4	6	10	8	—	—	—	—	—
2001–02	IK Oskarshamn	Allsvenskan	13	5	5	10	4	—	—	—	—	—
2002–03	IK Oskarshamn	Allsvenskan	33	4	9	13	26	—	—	—	—	—
2003–04	IK Oskarshamn	Allsvenskan	29	4	9	13	20	—	—	—	—	—
2004–05	IK Oskarshamn	Allsvenskan	39	5	8	13	18	7	1	0	1	0
Senior totals			346	92	149	241	247	19	5	6	11	4
