= Stefan Larsson (ice hockey) =

Swedish ice hockey player (born 1965)

- Born: 14 June 1965 (age 60) Ludvika, SWE
- Height: 6 ft 1 in (185 cm)
- Weight: 193 lb (88 kg; 13 st 11 lb)
- Position: Defence
- Shot: Left
- Played for: Västra Frölunda; Leksands IF
- National team: Sweden
- NHL draft: 133rd overall, 1984; Detroit Red Wings
- Playing career: 1983–2001

Roger Stefan Larsson (born 14 June 1965 in Ludvika, Sweden) is a retired Swedish professional ice hockey player.

Larsson spent most of his career with Västra Frölunda apart from two seasons with Leksands IF. He was drafted 133rd overall by the Detroit Red Wings in the 1984 NHL entry draft but chose to remain in Sweden.

== Career statistics ==
			Regular season					Playoffs
Season	Team	League	GP	G	A	Pts	PIM	GP	G	A	Pts	PIM
1979–80	Tyringe SoSS U16	—	—	—	—	—	—	—	—	—	—	—
1979–80	Tyringe SoSS J18	Juniorserien	—	—	—	—	—	—	—	—	—	—
1980–81	Tyringe SoSS U16	—	—	—	—	—	—	—	—	—	—	—
1980–81	Tyringe SoSS J18	Juniorserien	—	—	—	—	—	—	—	—	—	—
1980–81	Tyringe SoSS J20	Juniorserien	—	—	—	—	—	—	—	—	—	—
1981–82	Västerås IK J18	—	—	—	—	—	—	—	—	—	—	—
1982–83	Västerås IK J18	—	—	—	—	—	—	—	—	—	—	—
1982–83	Västerås IK J20	Juniorserien	—	—	—	—	—	—	—	—	—	—
1983–84	Västra Frölunda IF J20	Juniorserien	—	—	—	—	—	—	—	—	—	—
1983–84	Västra Frölunda IF	Elitserien	18	3	4	7	14	—	—	—	—	—
1984–85	Västra Frölunda IF	Division 1	31	10	4	14	48	6	0	0	0	0
1985–86	Västra Frölunda IF	Division 1	27	5	9	14	20	3	0	1	1	2
1986–87	Västra Frölunda IF	Division 1	32	7	16	23	18	2	2	0	2	0
1987–88	Leksands IF	Elitserien	32	7	6	13	26	3	0	0	0	4
1988–89	Leksands IF	Elitserien	31	6	12	18	68	9	3	1	4	10
1989–90	Västra Frölunda HC	Elitserien	38	4	9	13	42	—	—	—	—	—
1990–91	Västra Frölunda HC	Elitserien	21	3	6	9	44	—	—	—	—	—
1990–91	Västra Frölunda HC	Allsvenskan D1	18	6	5	11	16	10	5	2	7	18
1991–92	Västra Frölunda HC	Elitserien	40	7	13	20	18	3	0	0	0	0
1992–93	Västra Frölunda HC	Elitserien	22	7	7	14	22	—	—	—	—	—
1992–93	Västra Frölunda HC	Allsvenskan D1	15	2	10	12	12	3	1	1	2	6
1993–94	Västra Frölunda HC	Elitserien	30	7	8	15	26	4	0	0	0	4
1994–95	Västra Frölunda HC	Elitserien	20	4	3	7	30	—	—	—	—	—
1994–95	Västra Frölunda HC	Allsvenskan D1	18	4	12	16	6	5	2	3	5	2
1995–96	Västra Frölunda HC	Elitserien	39	4	8	12	18	13	1	4	5	10
1996–97	Västra Frölunda HC	Elitserien	48	4	5	9	26	3	0	1	1	2
1997–98	Västra Frölunda HC	Elitserien	44	7	7	14	18	5	2	2	4	4
1998–99	Västra Frölunda HC	Elitserien	49	15	10	25	30	4	1	1	2	2
1999–00	Västra Frölunda HC	Elitserien	50	11	13	24	24	5	2	1	3	2
2000–01	Västra Frölunda HC	Elitserien	44	8	9	17	26	5	1	0	1	6
Elitserien totals			526	97	120	217	432	54	10	10	20	44
