= Ove Karlsson (ice hockey) =

Swedish ice hockey player (born 1950)

- Born: July 9, 1950 (age 75) Gusum, SWE
- Height: 6 ft 1 in (185 cm)
- Weight: 194 lb (88 kg; 13 st 12 lb)
- Position: Forward
- Played for: Västra Frölunda HC
- Playing career: 1973–1984

Ove Karlsson (born 9 July 1950 in Gusum, Sweden) is a retired ice hockey player from Sweden.

== Biography ==
From 1974 to 1984, he played as forward with Västra Frölunda HC in the Elitserien (Swedish Elite League). He played 316 for the team, scoring 121 goals and 93 assists for 214 points. He began his career playing in the Swedish Second Division for Grums IK.

== See also ==
- List of Frölunda HC players
