= Curt Lundmark =

Swedish ice hockey player and manager

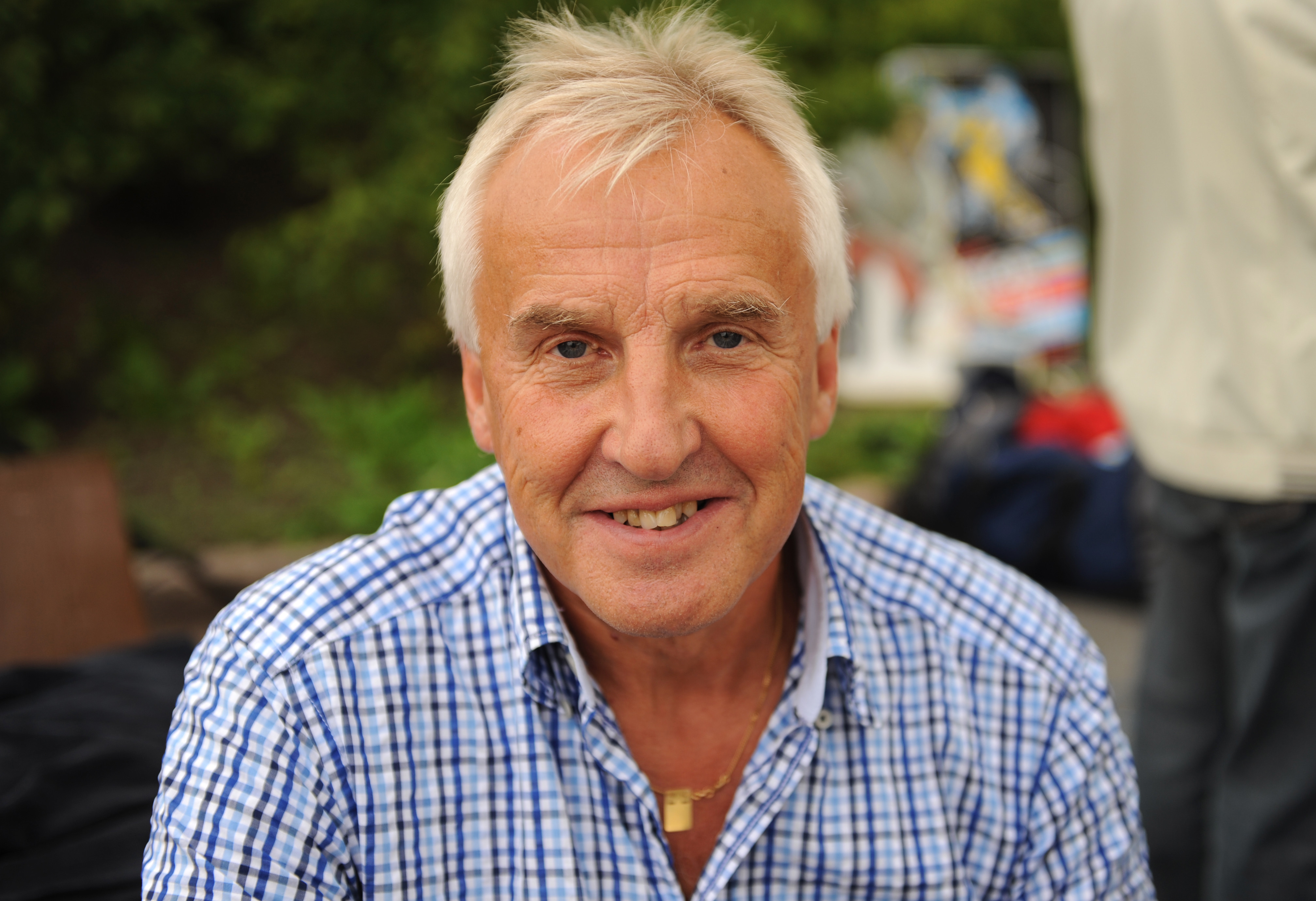
- Curt Lundmark in 2011
- Born: 9 September 1944 Byske, Sweden
- Position: defendseman
- Played for: Skellefteå AIK, IFK Kiruna, Västerås IK
- National team: Sweden
- Playing career: 1961–1975

Curt "Curre" Lundmark (born 9 September 1944) is a Swedish former ice hockey player and manager. As head coach, he led the Swedish men's national team to a gold medal during the 1994 Olympic Winter Games in Lillehammer. Earlier, he had also assisted Conny Evensson when Sweden won the 1991 IIHF World Championship in Turku and the 1992 IIHF World Championship in Prague. Led by Curt Lundmark, the Swedes also won a silver medal during the 1995 IIHF World Championship in Stockholm, losing the final game to Finland (1-4). Curt Lundmark resigned after that tournament, and was replaced by Kent Forsberg.

He has also coached club teams including Västerås IK, HV71, Jokerit and Leksands IF. For some years he was also the SVT Sport expert commentator, often working with Åsa E. Jönsson or Staffan Lindeborg.
