= Mathias Porseland =

Swedish ice hockey player

- Born: 12 June 1986 (age 40) Gothenburg, Sweden
- Height: 6 ft 1 in (185 cm)
- Weight: 187 lb (85 kg; 13 st 5 lb)
- Position: Defenceman
- Shoots: Right
- team Former teams: Free agent Frölunda HC; Rögle BK; HPK; HC Lev Praha; Admiral Vladivostok; Vityaz Podolsk; Brynäs IF; HPK; HC Litvínov; HC Dynamo Pardubice
- Playing career: 2005–present

Mathias Porseland (born 12 June 1986) is a Swedish professional ice hockey defenceman. He is currently a free agent having last played for HC Dynamo Pardubice of the Czech Extraliga.

== Career statistics ==
=== Regular season and playoffs ===
			Regular season					Playoffs
Season	Team	League	GP	G	A	Pts	PIM	GP	G	A	Pts	PIM
2002–03	Frölunda HC	J20	1	0	0	0	0	—	—	—	—	—
2003–04	Frölunda HC	J20	9	1	1	2	0	3	0	0	0	0
2004–05	Frölunda HC	J20	29	6	11	17	10	6	0	2	2	2
2005–06	Frölunda HC	J20	39	4	11	15	28	7	0	6	6	10
2005–06	Frölunda HC	SEL	5	0	0	0	0	—	—	—	—	—
2006–07	Bofors IK	Allsv	43	3	8	11	24	—	—	—	—	—
2007–08	Bofors IK	Allsv	45	4	21	25	44	—	—	—	—	—
2008–09	Rögle BK	SEL	53	4	11	15	26	10	2	3	5	6
2009–10	Rögle BK	SEL	51	6	10	16	30	10	1	2	3	8
