= Henric Hedlund =

Swedish ice hockey player

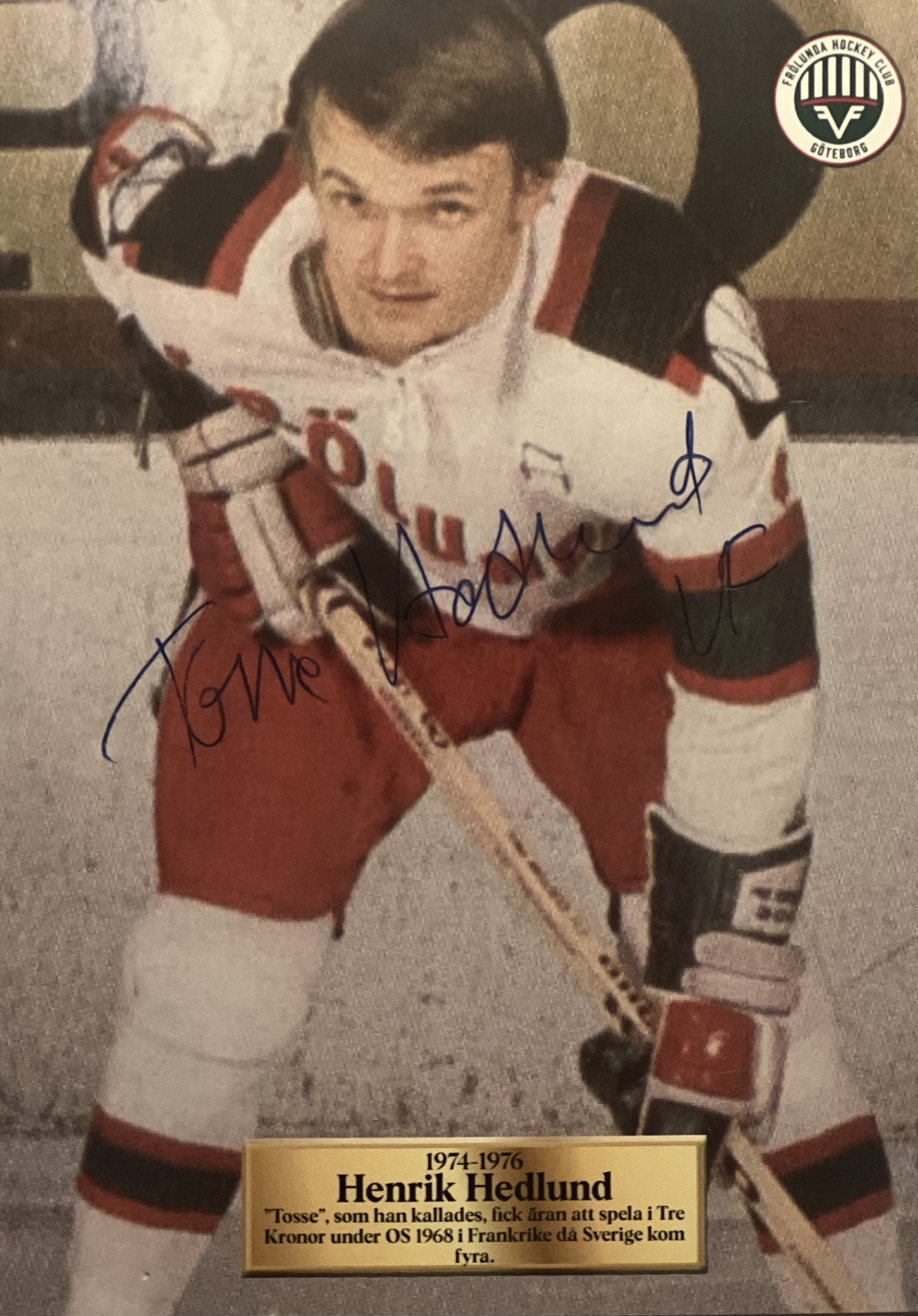
- Born: 7 April 1945 (age 80) Skellefteå, Sweden
- Position: Defence
- Shot: Left
- Played for: Skellefteå AIK; Västra Frölunda IF
- National team: Sweden
- Playing career: 1962–1976

Karl Torsten Henric "Tosse" Hedlund (born 7 April 1945) is a retired Swedish professional ice hockey player. He played for Skellefteå AIK and Västra Frölunda IF. He also competed in the 1968 Winter Olympics, where he scored three goals and two assists.

== Career statistics ==
			Regular season					Playoffs
Season	Team	League	GP	G	A	Pts	PIM	GP	G	A	Pts	PIM
1975–76	Västra Frölunda IF	SEL	35	3	10	13	22	–	–	–	–	–
