= Arne Carlsson (ice hockey) =

Swedish ice hockey player

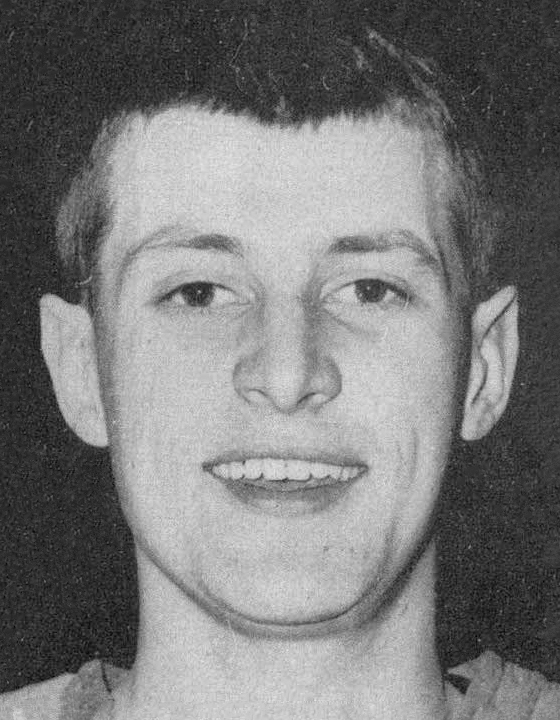
- Born: 5 January 1943 (age 83) Uppsala, Sweden
- Height: 6 ft 2 in (188 cm)
- Weight: 190 lb (86 kg; 13 st 8 lb)
- Position: Defence
- Shot: Left
- Played for: Södertälje SK; Frölunda HC; Almtuna IS
- National team: Sweden
- Playing career: 1959–1977

Gustav Arne Carlsson (born 5 January 1943) is a Swedish former ice hockey defenceman.

Carlsson competed at the 1968 Winter Olympics in Grenoble, France. He previously played for Södertälje SK, Frölunda HC, and Almtuna IS in the Swedish Elite League.
