= Conny Evensson =

Swedish ice hockey player and coach

- Born: 17 April 1945 Torsby, Sweden
- Played for: IK Viking, Malmö FF, Färjestads BK
- Playing career: 1963–1975

Jan Olle Conny Evensson (born 17 April 1945) is a retired Swedish professional ice hockey player and coach. He is currently an advisor in leadership subjects for Frölunda HC.

Evensson is one of the most successful ice hockey coaches in Sweden. He led, together with his assistant coach Curt Lundmark, Team Sweden to two consecutive World Championships titles in 1991 and 1992.

Evensson was born in Torsby and his family moved from Torsby to Hagfors when Conny was just two years old. He started his hockey career with Hagfors club IK Viking before signing with Malmö FF in 1965. After one year with Malmö FF he moved back to Värmland and signed with Färjestads BK. He played with them until 1975 when he retired.
