= Thomas Kärrbrandt =

Swedish ice hockey player

- Born: March 18, 1959 (age 66)
- Height: 6 ft 2 in (188 cm)
- Weight: 181 lb (82 kg; 12 st 13 lb)
- Position: Defence
- Shot: Left
- Played for: Västra Frölunda IF
- Playing career: 1976–1984

Thomas Kärrbrandt (born March 18, 1959) is a retired Swedish professional ice hockey player. He played for Västra Frölunda IF in Elitserien.

== Career statistics ==
			Regular season					Playoffs
Season	Team	League	GP	G	A	Pts	PIM	GP	G	A	Pts	PIM
1976–77	Västra Frölunda IF	SEL	15	0	1	1	0	–	–	–	–	–
1977–78	Västra Frölunda IF	SEL	16	1	0	1	4	–	–	–	–	–
1978–79	Västra Frölunda IF	SEL	36	3	3	6	36	–	–	–	–	–
1979–80	Västra Frölunda IF	SEL	35	1	6	7	22	8	0	0	0	12
1980–81	Västra Frölunda IF	SEL	25	6	8	14	22	–	–	–	–	–
1981–82	Västra Frölunda IF	SEL	36	3	1	4	36	–	–	–	–	–
1982–83	Västra Frölunda IF	SEL	28	3	3	6	30	–	–	–	–	–
1983–84	Västra Frölunda IF	SEL	31	1	4	5	38	–	–	–	–	–
SEL totals			222	18	26	44	188	8	0	0	0	12
