= 1961–62 Swedish Division I season =

Swedish ice hockey season

The 1961–62 Swedish Division I season was the 18th season of Swedish Division I. Djurgårdens IF won the league title by finishing first in the Swedish championship series.

== Regular season ==
=== Division I North ===
	Team	GP	W	T	L	+/-	P
1	AIK	14	9	1	4	58–37	19
2	Wifsta/Östrands IF	14	9	0	5	51–35	18
3	Leksands IF	14	8	1	5	64–38	17
4	Skellefteå AIK	14	8	1	5	71–51	17
5	Strömsbro IF	14	7	1	6	61–59	15
6	Gävle GIK	14	7	1	6	53–58	15
7	Morgårdshammars IF	14	5	0	9	44–72	10
8	Karlbergs BK	14	0	1	13	28–80	1

=== Division I South ===
	Team	GP	W	T	L	+/-	P
1	Djurgårdens IF	14	13	1	0	82–37	28
2	Västra Frölunda IF	14	9	1	4	93–39	19
3	Västerås IK	14	9	1	4	72–49	19
4	Södertälje SK	14	7	3	4	59–64	17
5	IFK Bofors	14	6	0	8	42–61	12
6	Brynäs IF	14	3	2	9	53–61	8
7	Forshaga IF	14	3	1	10	36–83	7
8	Tranås AIF	14	1	1	12	36–79	3

== Qualification round ==
	Team	GP	W	T	L	+/-	P
1	Brynäs IF	7	6	0	1	52–21	12
2	IFK Bofors	7	4	2	2	36–24	10
3	Morgårdshammars IF	7	4	1	2	38–30	9
4	Gävle GIK	7	3	3	2	25–21	9
5	Karlbergs BK	7	3	1	3	22–22	7
6	Forshaga IF	7	2	1	4	33–41	5
7	Strömsbro IF	7	2	1	4	25–34	7
8	Tranås AIF	7	0	0	7	13–51	3

== Swedish championship series ==
	Team	GP	W	T	L	+/-	P
1	Djurgårdens IF	7	6	1	0	54–20	13
2	Västra Frölunda IF	7	6	1	0	33–21	13
3	Västerås IK	7	3	2	2	24–26	8
4	Skellefteå AIK	7	3	1	3	39–31	7
5	Leksands IF	7	3	0	4	28–28	6
6	Södertälje SK	7	2	1	4	26–27	5
7	AIK	7	1	1	5	19–42	3
8	Wifsta/Östrands IF	7	0	1	6	13–40	1
