= Leif Henriksson =

Swedish ice hockey player and coach (1943–2019)

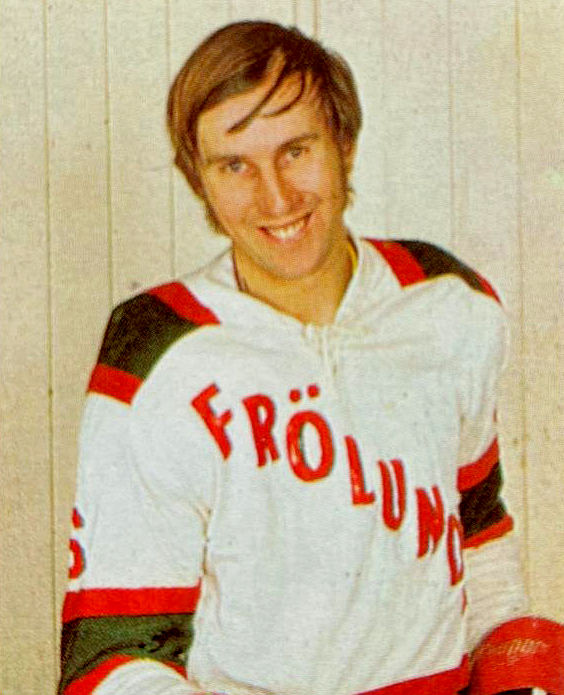
- Born: 26 December 1943 Karlskoga, Sweden
- Died: 15 March 2019 (aged 75) Karlskoga, Sweden
- Height: 6 ft 1 in (185 cm)
- Weight: 172 lb (78 kg; 12 st 4 lb)
- Position: Right wing
- Shot: Right
- Played for: IFK Bofors; KB Karlskoga; Västra Frölunda HC
- National team: Sweden
- Playing career: 1961–1977

Leif Gunnar "Blixten" Henriksson (26 December 1943 – 15 March 2019) was a Swedish professional ice hockey player and coach. He spent most of his playing career with Frölunda HC. His nickname "Blixten" ("Lightning") referred to his skating strength. He finished fourth in the team tournament at the 1968 Winter Olympics.

Henriksson died in March 2019.
