= Gert Blomé =

Swedish ice hockey player (1934–2021)

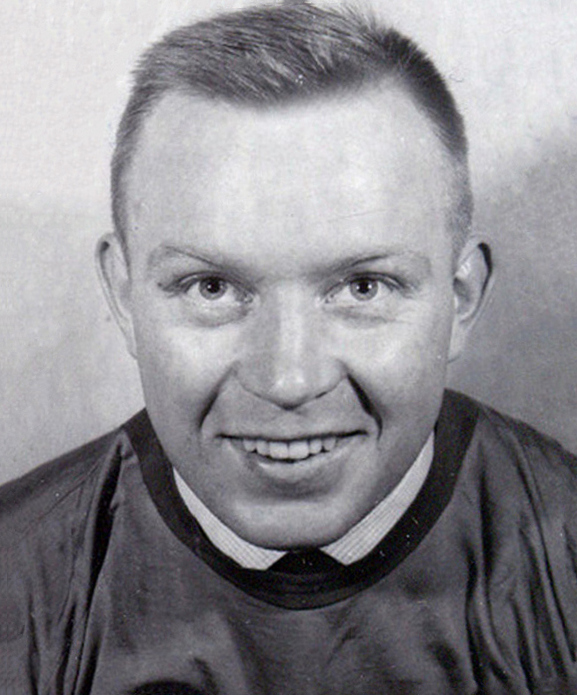
- Gert Blomé in the early 1960s

Personal information
- Born: 28 August 1934 Gävle, Sweden
- Died: 27 January 2021 (aged 86) Gothenburg, Sweden
- Height: 1.72 m (5 ft 8 in)
- Weight: 80 kg (176 lb)

Sport
- Sport: Ice hockey
- Club: Gävle GIK (1956–1961); Västra Frölunda IF (1961–1972)
- Retired: 1972
Medal record
Representing Sweden
Olympic Games
Silver medal – second place	1964 Innsbruck	Team
World Championships
Bronze medal – third place	1958 Oslo	Team
Gold medal – first place	1962 Colorado Springs/Denver	Team
Silver medal – second place	1963 Stockholm	Team
Bronze medal – third place	1965 Tampere	Team
Silver medal – second place	1967 Vienna	Team

Gert Arne Blomé (28 August 1934 – 27 January 2021) was a Swedish ice hockey player. He competed at the 1960 and 1964 Olympics and finished in fifth and second place, respectively. At the world championships he won one gold (1962), two silver (1963 and 1967) and two bronze medals (1958, 1967). He was a European champion in 1962, finished second in 1958, 1963, 1964 and 1967 and third in 1959–1961 and 1965.

Blomé started to play with Gävle GIK in 1956 and won a national title next year. In 1961 he moved to Västra Frölunda IF and won another Swedish title in 1965, receiving the Guldpucken Award as the best Swedish player. He was selected to the Swedish all-star team in 1961, 1962, 1965 and 1967 and was awarded the Stora Grabbars Märke No. 55.

He died in January 2021 at the age of 86.
