= Göran Nilsson (ice hockey) =

Swedish ice hockey player

- Born: September 9, 1956 (age 69)
- Height: 6 ft 0 in (183 cm)
- Weight: 185 lb (84 kg; 13 st 3 lb)
- Position: Defence
- Shot: Left
- Played for: Västra Frölunda IF/HC; Malmö IF
- Playing career: 1975–1989

Lars Göran Leonard Nilsson (born September 9, 1956) is a retired Swedish professional ice hockey player. He played for Västra Frölunda IF/HC and Malmö IF.

== Career statistics ==
			Regular season					Playoffs
Season	Team	League	GP	G	A	Pts	PIM	GP	G	A	Pts	PIM
1975–76	Västra Frölunda IF	SEL	33	4	1	5	4	–	–	–	–	–
1976–77	Västra Frölunda IF	SEL	32	1	6	7	12	–	–	–	–	–
1977–78	Västra Frölunda IF	SEL	36	5	3	8	22	–	–	–	–	–
1978–79	Västra Frölunda IF	SEL	36	4	5	9	32	–	–	–	–	–
1979–80	Västra Frölunda IF	SEL	36	1	7	8	26	8	0	1	1	10
1980–81	Västra Frölunda IF	SEL	35	8	6	14	23	2	0	0	0	0
1981–82	Västra Frölunda IF	SEL	33	3	6	9	12	–	–	–	–	–
1982–83	Västra Frölunda IF	SEL	31	6	3	9	18	–	–	–	–	–
1983–84	Västra Frölunda IF	SEL	16	2	3	5	16	–	–	–	–	–
1984–85	Västra Frölunda HC	SEL-2	29	3	8	11	10	6	1	0	1	0
1985–86	Malmö IF	SEL-2	29	2	7	9	16	–	–	–	–	–
1986–87	Malmö IF	SEL-2	23	3	3	6	16	–	–	–	–	–
1987–88	Malmö IF	SEL-2	28	5	10	15	16	3	1	0	1	0
1988–89	Malmö IF	SEL-2	29	5	4	9	18	13	1	1	2	10
SEL totals			288	34	40	74	165	10	0	1	1	10
