= Hasse Sjöö =

Swedish ice hockey player

- Born: 17 December 1959 (age 65)
- Position: Forward
- Shot: Left
- Played for: Västra Frölunda IF; HV71
- National team: Sweden
- Playing career: 1979–1992

Hasse Mikael Sjöö (born 17 December 1959) is a retired professional Swedish ice hockey player. He played for Västra Frölunda IF and HV71 in Elitserien.
