= 1964–65 Swedish Division I season =

Swedish ice hockey season

The 1964–65 Swedish Division I season was the 21st season of Swedish Division I. Vastra Frolunda IF won the league title by finishing first in the final round.

== First round ==
=== Northern Group ===
| | Team | GP | W | T | L | +/- | P |
|---|---|---|---|---|---|---|---|
| 1 | MoDo AIK | 14 | 9 | 2 | 3 | 80–45 | 20 |
| 2 | Leksands IF | 14 | 9 | 1 | 4 | 71–70 | 19 |
| 3 | Skellefteå AIK | 14 | 9 | 1 | 4 | 57–40 | 19 |
| 4 | AIK | 14 | 8 | 2 | 4 | 59–52 | 18 |
| 5 | Wifsta/Östrand-Fagerviks IF | 14 | 4 | 3 | 7 | 50–56 | 11 |
| 6 | IFK Umeå | 14 | 5 | 1 | 8 | 43–62 | 11 |
| 7 | Strömsbro IF | 14 | 3 | 3 | 8 | 38–61 | 9 |
| 8 | Mora IK | 14 | 1 | 3 | 10 | 50–92 | 5 |

=== Southern Group ===
| | Team | GP | W | T | L | +/- | P |
|---|---|---|---|---|---|---|---|
| 1 | Västra Frölunda IF | 14 | 11 | 1 | 2 | 78–39 | 23 |
| 2 | Brynäs IF | 14 | 11 | 0 | 3 | 95–33 | 30 |
| 3 | Västerås IK | 14 | 10 | 0 | 4 | 90–52 | 20 |
| 4 | Södertälje SK | 14 | 7 | 1 | 6 | 69–53 | 15 |
| 5 | Djurgårdens IF | 14 | 7 | 0 | 7 | 60–44 | 14 |
| 6 | IK Viking | 14 | 5 | 0 | 9 | 44–95 | 10 |
| 7 | Malmö FF | 14 | 2 | 1 | 11 | 37–81 | 5 |
| 8 | Grums IK | 14 | 0 | 1 | 13 | 28–103 | 1 |

== Qualification round ==
=== Northern Group ===
| | Team | GP | W | T | L | +/- | P |
|---|---|---|---|---|---|---|---|
| 1 | IFK Umeå | 6 | 10 | 2 | 0 | 61–38 | 22 |
| 2 | Wifsta/Östrand-Fagerviks IF | 6 | 5 | 4 | 3 | 53–43 | 14 |
| 3 | Strömsbro IF | 6 | 4 | 2 | 6 | 52–54 | 10 |
| 4 | Mora IK | 6 | 0 | 2 | 10 | 40–71 | 2 |

=== Southern Group ===
| | Team | GP | W | T | L | +/- | P |
|---|---|---|---|---|---|---|---|
| 1 | Djurgårdens IF | 6 | 8 | 1 | 3 | 67–33 | 17 |
| 2 | Malmö FF | 6 | 6 | 2 | 4 | 62–39 | 14 |
| 3 | IK Viking | 6 | 6 | 0 | 6 | 45–59 | 10 |
| 4 | Grums IK | 6 | 2 | 1 | 9 | 35–78 | 2 |

== Final round ==
| | Team | GP | W | T | L | +/- | P |
|---|---|---|---|---|---|---|---|
| 1 | Västra Frölunda IF | 14 | 12 | 0 | 2 | 72–39 | 24 |
| 2 | Brynäs IF | 14 | 10 | 2 | 2 | 77–34 | 22 |
| 3 | AIK | 14 | 6 | 1 | 7 | 60–58 | 13 |
| 4 | Leksands IF | 14 | 5 | 3 | 6 | 41–47 | 13 |
| 5 | Södertälje SK | 14 | 5 | 2 | 7 | 47–65 | 12 |
| 6 | Skellefteå AIK | 14 | 4 | 2 | 8 | 43–54 | 10 |
| 7 | Västerås IK | 14 | 5 | 0 | 9 | 51–69 | 10 |
| 8 | MoDo AIK | 14 | 2 | 4 | 8 | 44–69 | 8 |
