= Benny Westblom =

Swedish ice hockey player

Personal information
- Born: April 30, 1954 (age 71)

Sport
- Sport: ice hockey
- Position: goaltender

Lars Benny Westblom (born April 30, 1954, in Gävle, Sweden) is a retired Swedish professional ice hockey goaltender.

Westblom began his career playing for Brynäs IF in 1972. In 1977, Westblom joined Västra Frölunda and remained with the team until 1983. He then spent one season with HV71 before re-joining Västra Frölunda in 1984 and stayed with them until his retirement in 1990.
