= 1965–66 Swedish Division I season =

Swedish ice hockey season

The 1965–66 Swedish Division I season was the 22nd season of Swedish Division I. Brynas IF won the league title by beating Vastra Frolunda IF in the playoff final.

== Regular season ==
=== Northern Group ===
| | Team | GP | W | T | L | +/- | P |
|---|---|---|---|---|---|---|---|
| 1 | AIK | 21 | 16 | 0 | 5 | 93–63 | 32 |
| 2 | Leksands IF | 21 | 13 | 3 | 5 | 103–72 | 29 |
| 3 | MoDo AIK | 21 | 13 | 1 | 7 | 87–59 | 27 |
| 4 | Wifsta/Östrand-Fagerviks IF | 21 | 10 | 2 | 9 | 91–78 | 22 |
| 5 | Skellefteå AIK | 21 | 7 | 3 | 11 | 73–70 | 17 |
| 6 | IFK Umeå | 21 | 5 | 5 | 11 | 67–76 | 15 |
| 7 | Rönnskärs IF | 21 | 6 | 2 | 13 | 60–107 | 14 |
| 8 | Hammarby IF | 21 | 6 | 0 | 15 | 55–104 | 12 |

=== Southern Group ===
| | Team | GP | W | T | L | +/- | P |
|---|---|---|---|---|---|---|---|
| 1 | Brynäs IF | 21 | 19 | 0 | 2 | 149–53 | 38 |
| 2 | Västra Frölunda IF | 21 | 14 | 1 | 6 | 132–72 | 29 |
| 3 | Södertälje SK | 21 | 11 | 3 | 7 | 108–70 | 25 |
| 4 | Djurgårdens IF | 21 | 12 | 0 | 9 | 100–84 | 24 |
| 5 | Västerås IK | 21 | 11 | 0 | 10 | 86–79 | 22 |
| 6 | Örebro SK | 21 | 6 | 0 | 15 | 49–147 | 12 |
| 7 | Färjestads BK | 21 | 4 | 2 | 15 | 45–93 | 10 |
| 8 | Malmö FF | 21 | 3 | 2 | 16 | 50–121 | 8 |

== Playoffs ==
=== Quarterfinals ===
- Djurgårdens IF – AIK 6–1, 7–1
- Västra Frölunda IF – MoDo AIK 7–1, 4–3
- Leksands IF – Södertälje SK 5–2, 3–4, 3–1
- Brynäs IF – Wifsta/Östrand-Fagerviks IF 11–0, 7–2

=== Semifinals ===
- Brynäs IF – Leksands IF 8–3, 3–1
- Västra Frölunda IF – Djurgårdens IF 5–4, 2–6, 12–1

=== 3rd place ===
- Djurgårdens IF – Leksands IF 7–4, 7–7

=== Final ===
- Brynäs IF – Västra Frölunda IF 4–1, 5–6, 7–1
