= Roger Rönnberg =

Swedish ice hockey coach

- Born: July 27, 1971 (age 54) Luleå, Sweden
- Position: Defence
- NHL draft: Undrafted
- Playing career: 1989–1990

Roger Rönnberg (born 27 July 1971) is a Swedish ice hockey player. He was working as head coach of Gothenburg’s SHL team Frölunda HC. He is currently working as head coach of Fribourg National League hockey team, HC Fribourg Gottéron.

== Career ==
Rönnberg started his career behind the bench in the youth ranks of Luleå HF. After serving as assistant coach of the club's men's team in the SHL during the 2006-07 season, he took over the team alongside Roger Kyrö, forming a coaching duo for the following three years.

He is the former head coach of the Sweden men's national junior ice hockey team, but was succeeded by his assistant coach Rikard Grönborg after the 2013 World Junior Ice Hockey Championships where the Junior Crowns lost to USA in the final and brought home Sweden's 9th silver in WJC. Rönnberg was an assistant coach for the Sweden men's national ice hockey team at the 2009, 2010, and 2011 IIHF World Championships.

Rönnberg stepped in as head coach for Frölunda Indians after Kent Johansson in 2013 and rebuilt the team completely. Only keeping a few key-players, including captain Joel Lundqvist, Rönnberg broke Frölundas trend of buying expensive players from other teams and instead choose to look for young talents in Gothenburg’s youth teams. Six players that Rönnberg coached in the WJC joined up to play for Frölunda when he took over the team, and a few more after returning from the US or KHL.

In the 2015-16 season, he coached Frölunda to the Swedish national championship and to the Champions Hockey League title.
