= Lars-Eric Lundvall =

Swedish ice hockey player and coach (1934–2020)

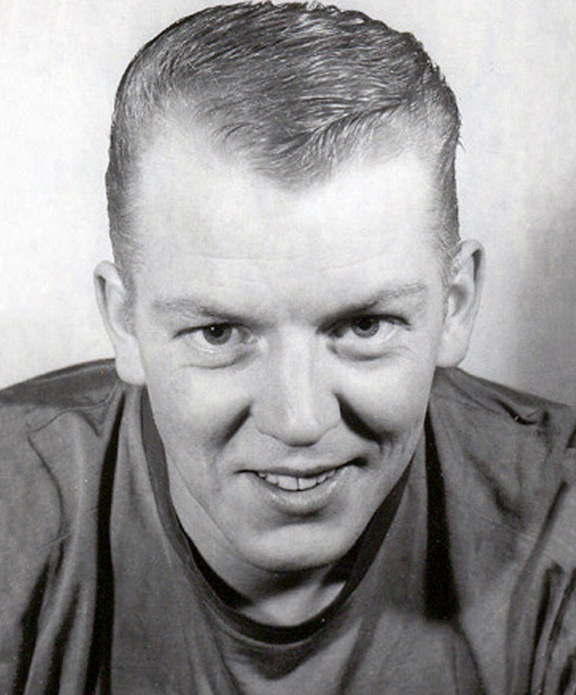
- Lars-Eric Lundvall in the mid 1960's
- Born: 3 April 1934 Karlskoga, Sweden
- Died: 8 April 2020 (aged 86)
- Height: 5 ft 11 in (180 cm)
- Weight: 172 lb (78 kg; 12 st 4 lb)
- Position: Left wing
- Shot: Left
- Played for: IFK Bofors; Södertälje SK; Västra Frölunda IF
- National team: Sweden
- Playing career: 1952–1968
Medal record
Representing Sweden
Olympic Games
Silver medal – second place	1964 Innsbruck	Team
World Championships
Bronze medal – third place	1957 Moscow	Team
Bronze medal – third place	1958 Oslo	Team
Gold medal – first place	1962 Colorado Springs/Denver	Team
Silver medal – second place	1963 Stockholm	Team
Bronze medal – third place	1965 Tampere	Team

Lars-Eric Lundvall (3 April 1934 – 8 April 2020) was a Swedish professional ice hockey player and coach. Between 1956 and 1965 he played 195 international matches and scored 79 goals. During this period he won 5 world and 10 European championship medals, including world and European titles in 1957 and 1962; he also took part in the 1956, 1960 and 1964 Olympics and finished in fourth, fifth and second place, respectively.

Domestically Lundvall won two Swedish titles: with Södertälje SK in 1956 and with Västra Frölunda IF in 1965. He was selected to the Swedish all-star team in 1959 and 1960.

After retiring from competitions in 1968, Lundvall stayed as a coach with his last club Västra Frölunda IF. He also ran a gas station with his long-term teammate Ronald Pettersson. He died in 2020, aged 86.
