= 1963–64 Swedish Division I season =

Swedish ice hockey season

The 1963–64 Swedish Division I season was the 20th season of Swedish Division I. Brynas IF won the league title by finishing first in the final round.

== First round ==
=== Northern Group ===
	Team	GP	W	T	L	+/-	P
1	Leksands IF	14	8	3	3	61–40	19
2	MoDo AIK	14	7	5	2	45–36	19
3	Skellefteå AIK	14	8	2	4	59–38	18
4	Strömsbro IF	14	7	3	4	63–50	17
5	AIK	14	7	2	5	53–51	16
6	Wifsta/Östrands IF	14	6	1	7	57–49	13
7	Clemensnäs IF	14	1	5	8	40–64	7
8	Gävle GIK	14	1	1	12	42–92	3

=== Southern Group ===
	Team	GP	W	T	L	+/-	P
1	Västra Frölunda IF	14	11	1	2	91–41	23
2	Brynäs IF	14	11	0	3	95–48	22
3	Djurgårdens IF	14	10	0	4	80–49	20
4	Södertälje SK	14	8	2	4	68–42	18
5	Västerås IK	14	7	0	7	73–74	14
6	IK Viking	14	3	2	9	43–82	8
7	IF KB 63	14	2	2	10	38–76	6
8	Östers IF	14	0	1	13	35–111	1

== Qualification round ==
	Team	GP	W	T	L	+/-	P
1	Västerås IK	7	6	0	1	35–22	12
2	AIK	7	3	2	2	31–17	8
3	Wifsta/Östrands IF	7	4	0	3	23–28	8
4	IK Viking	7	3	1	3	39–21	7
5	Clemensnäs IF	7	3	0	4	30–33	6
6	Gävle GIK	7	2	2	3	28–32	6
7	IF KB 63	7	2	1	4	22–30	5
8	Östers IF	7	2	0	5	29–44	4

== Final round ==
	Team	GP	W	T	L	+/-	P
1	Brynäs IF	7	7	0	0	40–15	14
2	Leksands IF	7	5	1	1	39–18	11
3	Södertälje SK	7	4	0	3	28–21	8
4	Västra Frölunda IF	7	4	0	3	29–25	8
5	Djurgårdens IF	7	3	1	3	33–40	7
6	MoDo AIK	7	1	1	5	23–31	3
7	Strömsbro IF	7	1	1	5	17–42	3
8	Skellefteå AIK	7	1	0	6	18–35	2
