= 1962–63 Swedish Division I season =

Swedish ice hockey season

The 1962–63 Swedish Division I season was the 19th season of Swedish Division I. Djurgårdens IF won the league title by finishing first in the Swedish championship series.

== Regular season ==
=== Division I North ===
	Team	GP	W	T	L	+/-	P
1	Skellefteå AIK	14	10	1	3	63–35	21
2	Leksands IF	14	9	2	3	63–47	20
3	AIK	14	9	2	3	55–43	20
4	Wifsta/Östrands IF	14	9	1	4	50–43	19
5	Alfredshems IK	14	7	1	6	63–41	15
6	Mora IK	14	4	1	9	53–58	9
7	Morgårdshammars IF	14	2	0	12	38–67	4
8	Gävle GIK	14	2	0	12	40–73	4

=== Division I South ===
	Team	GP	W	T	L	+/-	P
1	Västra Frölunda IF	14	12	0	2	96–42	24
2	Djurgårdens IF	14	11	0	3	73–44	22
3	Brynäs IF	14	9	1	4	81–51	19
4	Södertälje SK	14	8	0	6	51–58	16
5	Västerås IK	14	5	2	7	50–54	12
6	IFK Bofors	14	3	3	8	51–67	9
7	Grums IK	14	3	1	10	39–78	7
8	Almtuna IS	14	1	1	12	34–81	3

== Qualification round ==
	Team	GP	W	T	L	+/-	P
1	Alfredshems IK	7	6	0	1	36–16	12
2	Västerås IK	7	5	0	2	28–23	10
3	IFK Bofors	7	4	0	3	28–29	8
4	Gävle GIK	7	3	0	4	25–26	6
5	Almtuna IS	7	3	0	4	27–29	6
6	Mora IK	7	3	0	4	26–33	6
7	Morgårdshammars IF	7	2	0	5	25–29	4
8	Grums IK	7	2	0	5	25–35	4

Morgårdshammar, Almtuna, Mora, and Grums were relegated to Division II.

== Swedish championship series ==
	Team	GP	W	T	L	+/-	P
1	Djurgårdens IF	7	5	1	1	43–17	11
2	Skellefteå AIK	7	5	1	1	27–19	11
3	Södertälje SK	7	4	1	2	28–30	9
4	Leksands IF	7	4	0	3	30–23	8
5	Västra Frölunda IF	7	3	1	3	33–28	7
6	Brynäs IF	7	2	1	4	28–39	5
7	AIK	7	2	0	5	24–38	4
8	Wifsta/Östrands IF	7	0	1	6	14–33	1
