= 2002–03 Elitserien season =

- League: Elitserien
- Sport: Ice hockey
- Duration: 23 September 2002 – 25 February 2003

Regular season
- League champion: Västra Frölunda HC
- Season MVP: Niklas Andersson (Västra Frölunda HC)
- Top scorer: Mikael Karlberg (Leksands IF)

Playoffs
- Finals champions: Västra Frölunda HC
- Runners-up: Färjestad BK

SHL seasons
- ← 2001–02 2003–04 →

The 2002–03 Elitserien season was the 28th season of the Elitserien, the top level of ice hockey in Sweden. 12 teams participated in the league, and Vastra Frolunda HC won the championship.

== Standings ==
	Club	GP	W	L	OTW	OTL	SOW	SOL	GF–GA	Pts
1.	Frölunda HC	50	29	11	2	2	4	2	162:97	103
2.	Färjestads BK	50	27	13	2	3	1	4	180:134	94
3.	Timrå IK	50	26	16	2	1	2	3	155:138	90
4.	Djurgårdens IF	50	26	17	0	2	3	2	139:128	88
5.	Luleå HF	50	21	17	2	4	2	4	134:127	79
6.	HV 71 Jönköping	50	21	16	2	4	1	6	143:142	79
7.	MODO Hockey	50	21	21	5	1	2	0	140:144	78
8.	Leksands IF	50	19	25	3	0	2	1	141:135	68
9.	Södertälje SK	50	17	24	3	0	3	3	113:128	66
10.	MIF Redhawks	50	14	26	2	1	6	1	141:146	60
11.	Brynäs IF	50	13	27	0	4	4	2	105:166	53
12.	Linköpings HC	50	10	31	0	1	3	5	98:166	42

== Playoffs ==
Quarterfinal
1.	Frölunda HC	4
7.	MoDo Hockey	2
3.	Timrå IK	4
5.	Luleå HF	0
2.	Färjestads BK	4
8.	Leksands IF	1
4.	Djurgårdens IF	4
6.	HV 71	3

Semifinal
1.	Frölunda HC	4
3.	Timrå IK	2
2.	Färjestads BK	4
4.	Djurgårdens IF	1

Final
1.	Frölunda HC	4
2.	Färjestads BK	0
