= 1968–69 Swedish Division I season =

Swedish ice hockey season

The 1968–69 Swedish Division I season was the 25th season of Swedish Division I. Leksands IF won the league title by finishing first in the final round.

== First round ==
=== Northern Group ===
	Team	GP	W	T	L	+/-	P
1	AIK	21	14	3	4	98–45	31
2	MoDo AIK	21	14	2	5	95–61	30
3	Leksands IF	21	13	3	5	142–57	29
4	Mora IK	21	11	5	5	92–74	27
5	Timrå IK	21	8	3	10	80–98	19
6	IFK Umeå	21	9	0	2	98–81	18
7	Skellefteå AIK	21	4	3	14	63–133	11
8	Hammarby IF	21	1	1	19	53–172	3

=== Southern Group ===
	Team	GP	W	T	L	+/-	P
1	Brynäs IF	21	18	1	2	158–72	37
2	Västra Frölunda IF	21	16	0	5	124–63	32
3	Södertälje SK	21	11	3	7	109–85	25
4	Västerås IK	21	12	1	8	82–86	25
5	Djurgårdens IF	21	6	4	11	81–100	16
6	Nybro IF	21	6	2	13	71–114	14
7	KB Karlskoga	21	5	2	14	69–117	12
8	Rögle BK	21	3	1	17	55–112	7

== Final round ==
	Team	GP	W	T	L	+/-	P
1	Leksands IF	7	4	2	1	30–20	10
2	Brynäs IF	7	4	1	2	29–14	9
3	Västra Frölunda	7	4	1	2	34–20	9
4	AIK	7	4	0	3	27–24	8
5	Södertälje SK	7	4	0	3	27–24	8
6	MoDo AIK	7	1	3	3	15–22	5
7	Västerås IK	7	1	2	4	18–36	4
8	Mora IK	7	1	1	5	20–40	3
