= 1966–67 Swedish Division I season =

Swedish ice hockey season

The 1966–67 Swedish Division I season was the 23rd season of Swedish Division I. Brynas IF won the league title by defeating Vastra Frolunda IF in the league final, 2 games to none.

== Regular season ==
=== Northern Group ===
	Team	GP	W	T	L	+/-	P
1	MoDo AIK	21	12	3	6	92–67	24
2	Mora IK	21	11	4	6	82–78	26
3	IFK Umeå	21	11	3	7	85–61	25
4	Leksands IF	21	11	2	8	104–68	24
5	Timrå IK	21	9	5	7	89–88	23
6	AIK	21	10	2	9	75–51	22
7	Skellefteå AIK	21	6	3	12	60–108	15
8	Clemensnäs IF	21	2	2	17	53–119	6

=== Southern Group ===
	Team	GP	W	T	L	+/-	P
1	Södertälje SK	21	18	2	1	121–44	44
2	Brynäs IF	21	14	2	5	147–48	38
3	Västra Frölunda IF	21	13	4	4	119–64	30
4	Djurgårdens IF	21	13	0	8	106–84	26
5	Rögle BK	21	10	2	9	79–85	22
6	Västerås IK	21	6	2	13	79–120	14
7	Örebro SK	21	2	2	17	54–155	6
8	Avesta BK	21	1	0	20	37–142	2

== Playoffs ==
=== Quarterfinals ===
- MoDo AIK – Djurgårdens IF 3–4, 6–3, 3–2
- Södertälje SK – Leksands IF 5–3, 4–2
- Brynäs IF – IFK Umeå 4–2, 4–2
- Västra Frölunda IF – Mora IK 8–2, 7–4

=== Semifinals ===
- Brynäs IF – MoDo AIK 6–4, 6–5
- Västra Frölunda IF – Södertälje SK 2–5, 3–0, 4–2

=== 3rd place ===
- Södertälje SK – MoDo AIK 9–1, 7–4

=== Final ===
- Brynäs IF – Västra Frölunda IF 8–4, 6–1
