= 1998–99 Elitserien season =

- League: Elitserien
- Sport: Ice hockey
- Duration: 17 September 1998 – 11 March 1999

Regular season
- League champion: Modo HK
- Season MVP: Daniel Sedin; Henrik Sedin (Modo Hockey)
- Top scorer: Jan Larsson (Brynäs IF)

Playoffs
- Finals champions: Brynäs IF
- Runners-up: Modo Hockey

SHL seasons
- ← 1997–98 1999–2000 →

The 1998–99 Elitserien season was the 24th season of the Elitserien, the top level of ice hockey in Sweden. 12 teams participated in the league, and Brynäs IF won the championship.

== Standings ==
	Club	GP	W	T	L	GF	GA	Pts
1.	Modo Hockey	50	30	10	10	168	100	103
2.	Färjestad BK	50	23	12	15	147	137	81
3.	Djurgårdens IF	50	22	12	16	143	144	81
4.	Leksands IF	50	20	14	16	174	152	76
5.	Brynäs IF	50	21	9	20	167	152	76
6.	Luleå HF	50	22	8	20	148	143	75
7.	Västra Frölunda	50	19	8	23	148	136	70
8	Malmö IF	50	18	9	23	140	144	68
9.	HV 71 Jönköping	50	18	12	20	133	148	67
10.	AIK	50	18	11	21	150	159	66
11.	Västerås IK	50	19	7	24	139	176	65
12.	IF Björklöven	50	9	10	31	101	167	41

== Playoffs ==
Quarterfinal
1	MODO Hockey	3
7	Västra Frölunda	1
2	Färjestads BK	1
8	Malmö IF	3
3	Djurgårdens IF	1
5	Brynäs IF	3
4	Leksands IF	1
6	Luleå HF	3

Semifinal
1	MODO Hockey	3
8	Malmö IF	1
5	Brynäs IF	3
6	Luleå HF	2

Final
1	MODO Hockey	2
5	Brynäs IF	3
