= 2000–01 Elitserien season =

- League: Elitserien
- Sport: Ice hockey
- Duration: 20 September 2000 – 24 February 2001

Regular season
- League champion: Djurgårdens IF
- Season MVP: Mikael Renberg (Luleå HF)
- Top scorer: Kristian Huselius (Västra Frölunda HC)

Playoffs
- Finals champions: Djurgårdens IF
- Runners-up: Färjestad BK

SHL seasons
- ← 1999–2000 2001–02 →

The 2000–01 Elitserien season was the 26th season of the Elitserien, the top level of ice hockey in Sweden. 12 teams participated in the league, and Djurgårdens IF won the championship, their most recent championship to date.

== Standings ==
	Club	GP	W	OTW	OTL	SOW	SOL	L	GF–GA	Pts
1.	Djurgårdens IF	50	30	11	1	2	3	3	164:116	103
2.	Färjestads BK	50	27	15	2	2	2	2	198:157	93
3.	Brynäs IF	50	23	14	1	5	4	3	167:146	87
4.	MODO Hockey	50	18	16	5	2	4	5	133:139	79
5.	Malmö IF	50	19	17	1	4	6	3	156:134	78
6.	Luleå HF	50	21	21	2	2	3	1	146:147	76
7	AIK Ishockey	50	18	21	5	1	3	2	142:142	73
8.	Västra Frölunda HC	50	21	22	2	0	0	5	155:139	72
9.	Timrå IK	50	16	21	4	1	2	6	136:156	67
10.	HV 71 Jönköping	50	17	23	2	0	3	5	147:149	66
11.	Leksands IF	50	16	28	0	2	3	1	135:178	57
12.	IF Björklöven	50	12	29	0	4	4	1	116:192	49

== Playoffs ==
Quarterfinal
1.	Djurgårdens IF	4
7.	AIK Ishockey	1
4.	MoDo Hockey	3
6.	Luleå HF	4
2.	Färjestads BK	4
8.	Västra Frölunda HC	1
3.	Brynäs IF	0
5.	Malmö IF	4

Semifinal
1.	Djurgårdens IF	4
6.	Luleå HF	1
2.	Färjestads BK	4
5.	Malmö IF	1

Final
1.	Djurgårdens IF	4
2.	Färjestads BK	2
