= Frölunda HC =

Swedish ice hockey club

- City: Gothenburg, Sweden
- League: Swedish Hockey League
- Founded: 3 February 1938
- Home arena: Scandinavium (capacity: 12,044)
- Colors
- General manager: Fredrik Sjöström
- Head coach: Robert Ohlsson
- Captain: Max Friberg
- Website: frolundahockey.com

Franchise history
- 1944–1984: Västra Frölunda IF (VFIF)
- 1984–1995: Västra Frölunda HC (VFHC)
- 1995–2020: Frölunda Indians
- 2020-present: Frölunda Hockey Club (FHC)

Championships
- Le Mat Trophy: 5 (1965, 2003, 2005, 2016, 2019)
- Champions Hockey League: 5 (2016, 2017, 2019, 2020, 2026)

Frölunda Hockey Club, previously known as the Frölunda Indians, is a Swedish professional ice hockey club based in Gothenburg. They currently play in the highest Swedish league, the Swedish Hockey League (SHL), formerly the Elitserien, where they have played for most of the club's existence. They last played in the lower division, the Allsvenskan, in 1995. Frölunda have won the national championship title five times: in 1965, 2003, 2005, 2016 and 2019.

The club was founded on 3 February 1938, as an ice hockey section in Västra Frölunda IF and became independent on 29 March 1984. Prior to the 1995/1996 season, the nickname Indians was adopted. This referring to the successful years of the 1960s, when fans started to call them the "Wild West" (Västra Frölunda is West Frölunda in English). But as they did not want a nickname like cowboys or something with firearms, Indians was selected. On 16 June 2004, the club shortened the name from Västra Frölunda Hockey Club to Frölunda Hockey Club. Frölunda's home venue is the Scandinavium arena in central Gothenburg, which has a capacity of 12,044 people. Frölundaborg is used when Scandinavium is occupied with other events. Frölunda's average home attendance has been the highest in the league for over a decade.

== History ==
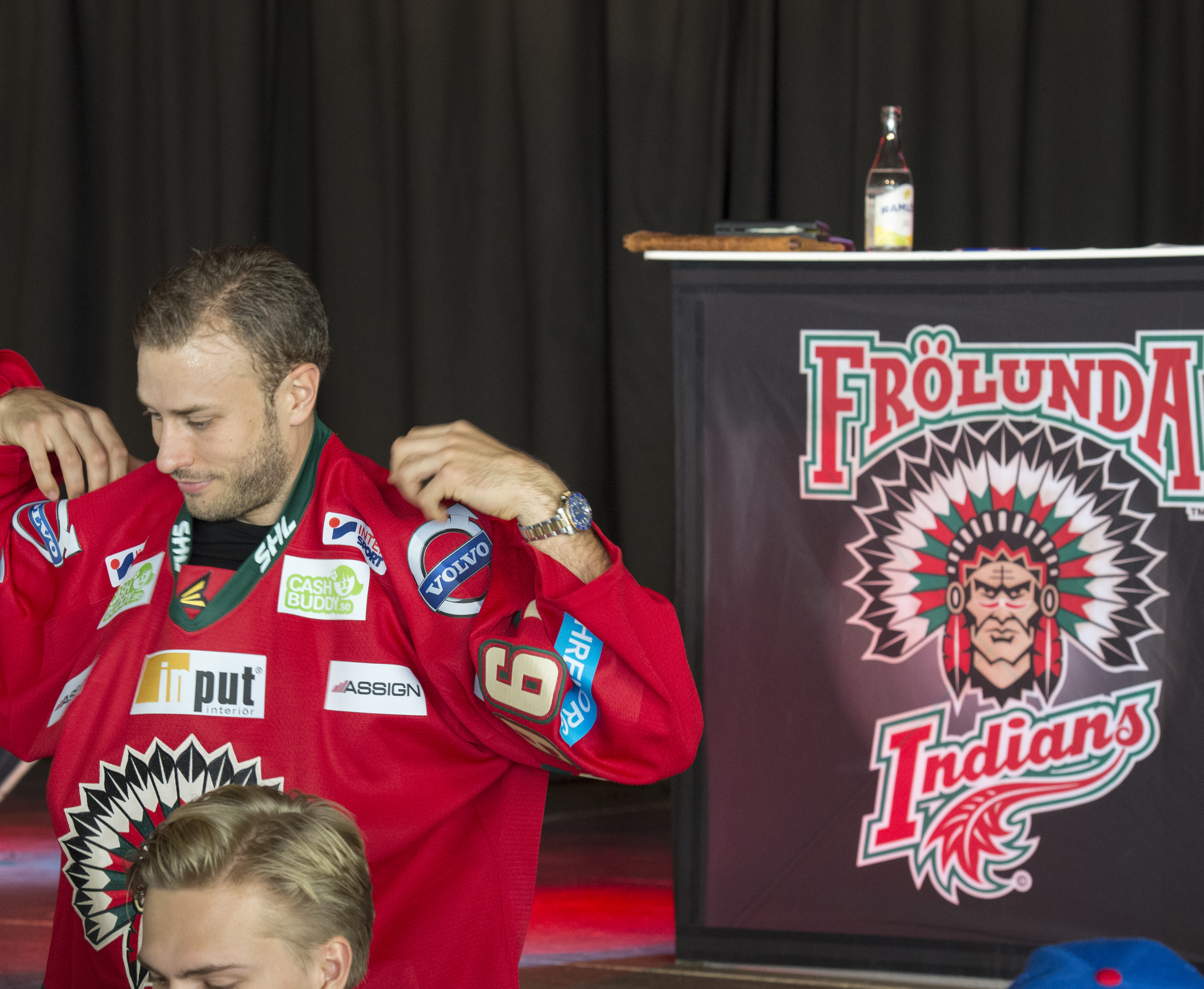
Frölunda's earlier crest to the right, which was replaced in 2022

In 2003, Frölunda became the champions after a 38-year hiatus. The final game in Scandinavium on 7 April against Färjestad BK was ended by late season recruit Tomi Kallio in the third overtime period. In the 2004–05 season, the club's 60th anniversary and 20th as independent club, the team won the league title, by having the best record during the regular season, and the Swedish Championship. That particular year was notable because the National Hockey League had a labour stoppage due to negotiations between the league and the players association. Many professional hockey players who could not play in the NHL chose to play in European or North American leagues. The largest number of professional NHL players were in Sweden during the season, including Gothenburg native Daniel Alfredsson, who joined his hometown club for the season. This increased the quality of play and many observers said that Elitserien was the best league in the world during 2004–05.

Frölunda set a new Elitserien record on 6 April 2006, by winning the Elitserien playoff semi-finals against Linköpings HC 4–3 after trailing the series 1–3. The season ended with a 2–4 defeat against Färjestads BK in the finals. The second game in the finals Ronnie Sundin played his 685th game for Frölunda becoming the player with most career games for the club.

Frölunda has claimed the Champions Hockey League title on five occasions in 2015–16, 2016–17, 2018–19, 2019–20, 2015–26, the most titles out of any club.

On 2 February 2022, Frölunda Hockey Club presented their new logo. According to the club, the new logo represents the city of Gothenburg, Västra Frölunda, gentleness and excitement. The logo visualizes two F's, two hands and the letter H which stands for hockey. The proposed redesign received negative feedback from fans and media due to similarities of the Nazi Party flag. The previous logo was announced in 1995 and represented the club for 27 years. On April 20, 2022, Frölunda updated their logo, which had been chosen by members on a member meeting.

== Season-by-season results ==
This is a partial list of the last five seasons completed by Frölunda. For the full season-by-season history, see List of Frölunda HC seasons.

| Season | League | Regular season | | | | | | | | Post season results |
| Season | League | Finish | GP | W | L | T | GF | GA | Pts | Post season results |
|---|---|---|---|---|---|---|---|---|---|---|
| 2021–22 | SHL | 4th | 52 | 31 | 17 | 4 | 155 | 139 | 87 | Won in Quarterfinals, 4–0 (Växjö); Lost in Semifinals, 1–4 (Luleå) |
| 2022–23 | SHL | 6th | 52 | 21 | 18 | 13 | 140 | 139 | 81 | Won in Quarterfinals, 4–3 (Färjestad); Lost in Semifinals, 2–4 (Växjö) |
| 2023–24 | SHL | 4th | 52 | 24 | 14 | 14 | 144 | 119 | 96 | Won in Quarterfinals, 4–3 (Leksand); Lost in Semifinals, 3–4 (Skellefteå) |
| 2024–25 | SHL | 3rd | 52 | 25 | 18 | 9 | 139 | 116 | 91 | Won in Quarterfinals, 4–2 (Timrå); Lost in Semifinals, 2–4 (Luleå) |
| 2025–26 | SHL | 2nd | 52 | 30 | 15 | 7 | 161 | 106 | 101 | Lost in Quarterfinals, 2–4 (Luleå) |

== Players and personnel ==
=== Current roster ===
| No. | Nat | Player | Pos | S/G | Age | Acquired | Birthplace |
|---|---|---|---|---|---|---|---|
| 17 | (Sweden) | Isac Born | LW | L | 22 | 2022 | Onsala, Sweden |
| 92 | (Sweden) | Filip Cederqvist | C | L | 26 | 2024 | Skara, Sweden |
| 44 | (Sweden) | Noah Dower Nilsson | C | L | 21 | 2022 | Strömstad, Sweden |
| 46 | (Switzerland) | Dominik Egli | D | R | 28 | 2024 | Frauenfeld, Switzerland |
| 2 | (Sweden) | Christian Folin (A) | D | R | 35 | 2021 | Kungsbacka, Sweden |
| 12 | (Sweden) | Max Friberg (C) | LW | R | 33 | 2017 | Skövde, Sweden |
| 6 | (Sweden) | Filip Hasa | D | L | 26 | 2022 | Uppsala, Sweden |
| 32 | (Sweden) | Noah Hasa | C | L | 23 | 2021 | Uppsala, Sweden |
| 26 | (Sweden) | Isac Heens | D | L | 27 | 2023 | Vansbro, Sweden |
| 33 | (Sweden) | Linus Högberg | D | L | 28 | 2023 | Stockholm, Sweden |
| 21 | (Finland) | Jere Innala | LW | L | 28 | 2025 | Hauho, Finland |
| 8 | (Sweden) | Samuel Johannesson | D | R | 25 | 2026 | Halmstad, Sweden |
| 1 | (Sweden) | Lars Johansson | G | L | 39 | 2022 | Avesta, Sweden |
| 31 | (Sweden) | Nicklas Lasu (A) | C | L | 37 | 2019 | Mölndal, Sweden |
| 11 | (Sweden) | Max Lindholm | W | L | 29 | 2025 | Österhaninge, Sweden |
| 27 | (Sweden) | Theodor Niederbach | C | R | 24 | 2025 | Bjästa, Sweden |
| 43 | (Sweden) | Tom Nilsson | D | R | 33 | 2022 | Tyresö, Sweden |
| 30 | (Norway) | Tobias Normann | G | L | 25 | 2024 | Fredrikstad, Norway |
| 40 | (Sweden) | Jacob Peterson | C | L | 27 | 2025 | Lidköping, Sweden |
| 25 | (Finland) | Arttu Ruotsalainen | RW | L | 28 | 2024 | Oulu, Finland |
| 15 | (Sweden) | Gustav Rydahl | C | L | 32 | 2023 | Karlstad, Sweden |
| 55 | (Sweden) | Ivar Stenberg | W | L | 19 | 2024 | Stenungsund, Sweden |
| 86 | (Sweden) | Erik Thorell | LW | L | 34 | 2023 | Karlstad, Sweden |
| 7 | (Sweden) | Henrik Tömmernes | D | L | 36 | 2023 | Karlstad, Sweden |
| 10 | (Finland) | Max Westergård | LW | L | 19 | 2025 | Tampere, Finland |

Updated June 6, 2025

=== Team captains ===
- Rune Johansson, 1945–1960
- Lars-Eric Lundvall, 1960–1968
- Arne Carlsson, 1968–1969
- Lars-Erik Sjöberg, 1969–1974
- Henric Hedlund, 1974–1976
- Leif Henriksson, 1976–1977
- Lars-Erik Esbjörs, 1976–1979
- Anders Broström, 1979–1980
- Göran Nilsson, 1980–1983
- Thomas Kärrbrandt, 1983–1984
- Göran Nilsson, 1984–1985
- Hasse Sjöö, 1985–1987
- Janne Karlsson, 1987–1990
- Mikael Andersson, 1990–1992
- Terho Koskela, 1992–1995
- Christian Ruuttu, 1995–1996
- Henrik Nilsson, 1996–2000
- Mikael Andersson, 2000–2003
- Jonas Johnson, 2003–2008
- Niklas Andersson, 2008–2009
- Joel Lundqvist, 2009–2023
- Max Friberg, 2023–present

=== Head coaches ===
- Karl-Erik Eriksson, 1956–1960
- Lars-Eric Lundvall, 1960–1963
- Curly Leachman, 1963–1964
- Lars-Eric Lundvall, 1964–1969
- Arne Eriksson, 1969–1971
- Jack Bownass, 1971–1973
- Lars Erik Lundvall, 1973–1975
- Arne Strömberg, 1975–1978
- Leif Henriksson, 1978–1980
- Berny Karlsson, 1980–1981
- Len Lunde, 1981–1982
- Leif Henriksson, 1982–1983
- Kjell Jönsson, 1983–1984
- Roland Mattsson, 1984–1985
- Thommie Bergman, 1985–1987
- Conny Evensson, 1987–1989
- Lennart Åhlberg, 1989–1990
- Lars-Erik Esbjörs, 1990–1991
- Leif Boork, 1991–1994
- Ulf Labraaten, 1994–1995
- Lasse Falk, 1995–1997
- Tommy Boustedt, 1997–2001
- Conny Evensson, 2001–2004
- Janne Karlsson, 2004 (interim)
- Stephan Lundh, 2004–2006
- Per Bäckman, 2006–2007
- Roger Melin, 2007–2008
- Ulf Dahlén, 2008–2010
- Kent Johansson, 2010–2013
- Roger Rönnberg, 2013–2025
- Robert Ohlsson, 2025–present

=== Honored members ===
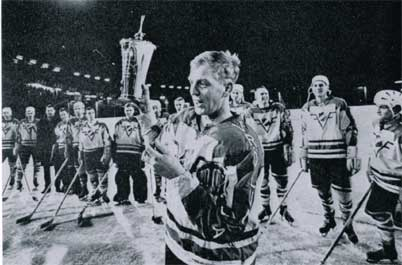
Team captain and playing coach Lars-Eric Lundvall hoisting the Le Mat Trophy when Frölunda won the Swedish Championship in 1965. Lundvall's jersey number 13 is retired by Frölunda.

Frölunda HC retired numbers
| No. | Player | Position | Career | No. retirement |
|---|---|---|---|---|
| 20 | Joel Lundqvist | C | 2000-2006 2009-2023 | October 17, 2026 |
| 5 | Christian Bäckman | D | 1998–2002; 2004–2005; 2009–2015 | January 27, 2024 |
| 13 | Lars Erik Lundvall | RW | 1960–1968 | March 3, 2002 |
| 14 | Ronald Pettersson | RW | 1960–1968 | March 3, 2002 |
| 14 | Patrik Carnbäck | RW | 1986–1992; 1994–1995; 1997–2003 | October 4, 2014 |
| 19 | Jörgen Pettersson | RW | 1973–1980; 1986–1991 | March 3, 2002 |
| 23 | Ronnie Sundin | D | 1992–1997; 1998–2009 | October 15, 2016 |
| 24 | Niklas Andersson | LW | 1987–1991; 2001–2011 | October 21, 2017 |
| 29 | Stefan Larsson | D | 1983–1987; 1989–2001 | March 3, 2002 |

Frölunda retired the numbers of four players, all on March 3, 2002. The number retired were; the number 13 worn by Lars Erik Lundvall, who spent eight seasons with Frölunda, all of them serving as team captain. The number 14 worn by Ronald Pettersson, who spent seven seasons with Frölunda before suffering a career-ending injury on 14 December 1967. The duo of Lundvall and Pettersson was one of the reason behind Frölunda's success in the 60's and secured that hockey got a strong foothold in Gothenburg. The number 19 worn by Jörgen Pettersson during his two stints with Frölunda. Pettersson joined the club in 1970 and played ten seasons for the club before joining the St. Louis Blues of the NHL. After five seasons in the NHL he returned and played another three seasons for the club. The number 29 worn by Stefan Larsson during his sixteen seasons with Frölunda. With the exception of two seasons, Larsson played for Frölunda his entire professional career. Since then an additional four players have had their numbers retired; number 14 a second time for Patrik Carnbäck on October 4, 2014. Number 23 for Ronnie Sundin on October 15, 2016. Number 24 for Niklas Andersson on October 21, 2017. And number 5 for Christian Bäckman on January 27, 2024.

Six former Frölunda players have been inducted into the International Ice Hockey Federation's Hall of Fame. Forward Ulf Sterner, played three seasons for Frölunda before becoming the first European-trained player to play in the NHL during his short sojourn with the New York Rangers during the 1964–65 NHL season; he was inducted in 2001. Forward Ronald "Sura Pelle" Pettersson, represented team Sweden in three olympic games and ten IIHF World Championships, totaling 252 games played for the national team; he was inducted in 2004. Ville Peltonen played the 1997–98 season for Frölunda, where he was both the team's and the league's leading scorer, he was inducted in 2016. Daniel Alfredsson played a total of four seasons for Frölunda, winning the Swedish Championships with Frölunda during the 2004–05 season. In 2006 he was a member of Sweden's gold medal-winning team at the Winter Olympics, he was inducted in 2018. Petteri Nummelin played two seasons for Frölunda between 1995 and 1997, he was inducted in 2024. Henrik Lundqvist won the Swedish Championships with Frölunda in 2003 and 2005, and won gold with team Sweden at the 2006 Winter Olympics and the 2017 Men's Ice Hockey World Championships, he was inducted in 2025.

In 2003, former Frölunda players Christian Ruuttu and Jorma Salmi were inducted to the Finnish Hockey Hall of Fame. Ville Peltonen was inducted in 2014. Trio of former Frölunda players who all won the Swedish Championships with Frölunda; Antti-Jussi Niemi, Fredrik Norrena, and Sami Salo were inducted in 2017. Petteri Nummelin was inducted in 2019. Tuukka Mäntylä was inducted in 2024.

== Club records and leaders ==
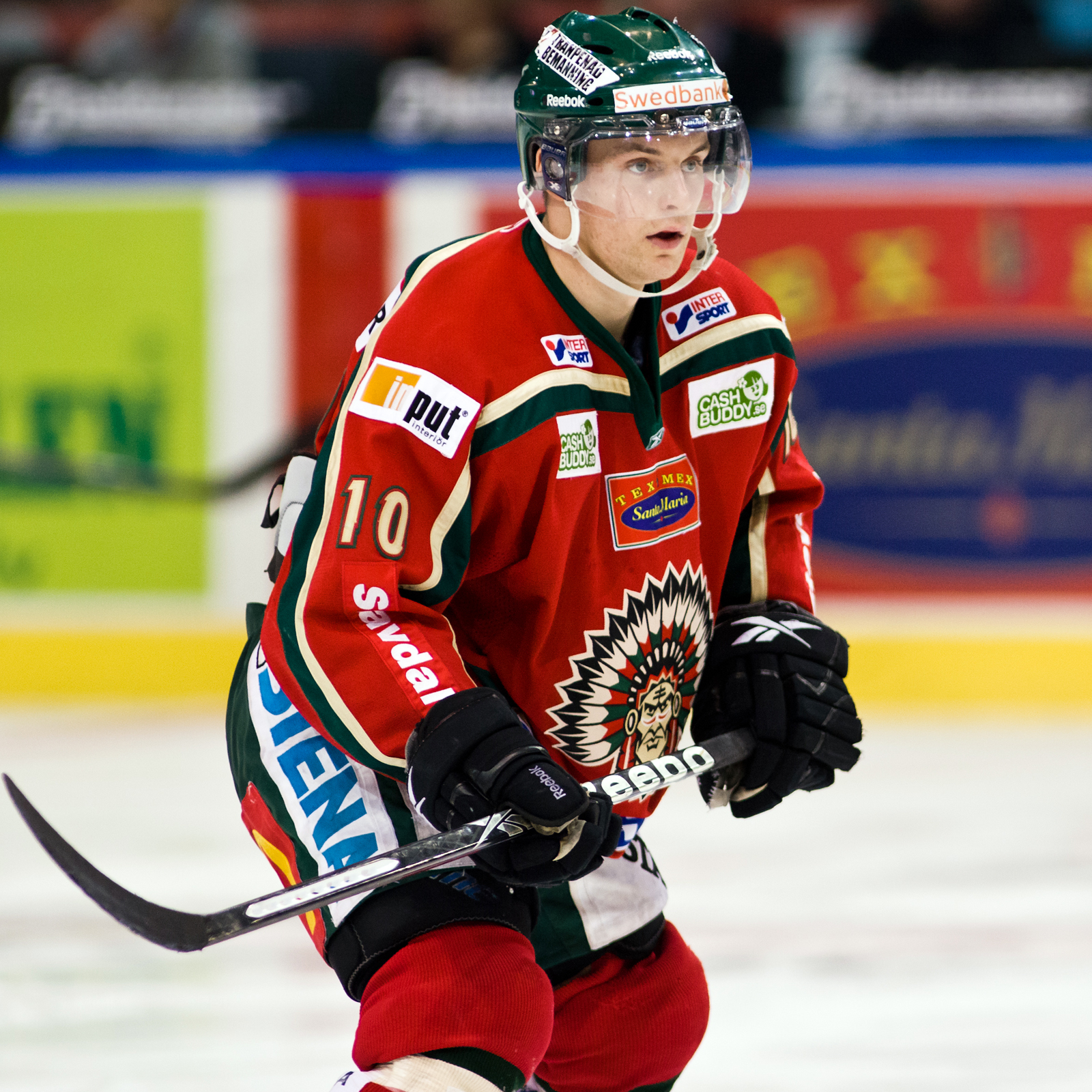
Fredrik Pettersson playing for Frölunda

=== Career ===
- Most games played: Ronnie Sundin, 739 (1992–1997 and 1998–09)
- Most seasons played: Joel Lundqvist, 20* (2000–2006 and 2009–2023)
- Most points scored: Niklas Andersson, 540 (1987–1991 and 2001–2011)
- Most goals scored: Niklas Andersson, 201 (1987–1991 and 2001–2011)
- Most assists: Niklas Andersson, 339 (1987–1991 and 2001–2011)

=== Regular season ===
- Most goals in a season: Magnus Kahnberg, 33 (2003–04)
- Most assists in a season: Niklas Andersson, 38 (2004–05)
- Most points in a season: Kristian Huselius, 67 (2000–01)
- Most penalty minutes in a season: Patric Blomdahl, 116 (2008–09)
- Most points in a season, defenceman: Magnus Johansson, 35 (2001–02)
- Most points in a season, rookie: Patrik Carnbäck, 54 (1989–90)
- Most shutouts in a season: Frederik Andersen, 8 (2011–12)
- Most power play goals in a season: Jonas Johnson, 12 (2005–06)
- Most short handed goals in a season: Kristian Huselius, 5 (2000–01)

=== Playoffs ===
- Most goals in a playoff season: Daniel Alfredsson, 12 (2004–05)
- Most goals by a defenseman in a playoff season: Ronnie Sundin, 6 (2005–06)
- Most assists in a playoff season: Jonas Johnson, 11 (2005–06)
- Most points in a playoff season: Artturi Lehkonen, 19 (2015–2016)
- Most points by a defenceman in a playoff season: Ronnie Sundin; Christian Bäckman, 9 (2002–03, 2005–06; 2004–05)
- Most shutouts in a playoff season: Henrik Lundqvist, 6 (2004–05)
- Most penalty minutes in a playoff season: Joel Lundqvist, 57 (2000–01)

=== Team ===
- Most points in a season: 112 (2004–05)
- Most wins in a season: 33 (2004–05)
- Most goals in a season: 181 (2001–02)
- Fewest goals against in a season: 96 (2004–05)

=== Scoring leaders ===
These are the top-ten point-scorers of Frölunda HC since the 1975–76 season. Figures are updated after each completed regular season.

Note: Pos = Position; GP = Games played; G = Goals; A = Assists; Pts = Points; P/G = Points per game; = current Frölunda HC player

Points
| Player | Pos | GP | G | A | Pts | P/G |
|---|---|---|---|---|---|---|
| Niklas Andersson | LW | 548 | 176 | 297 | 473 | 0.86 |
| Joel Lundqvist | C | 727 | 151 | 252 | 403 | 0.55 |
| Jonas Johnson | C | 513 | 156 | 196 | 352 | 0.68 |
| Tomi Kallio | RW | 433 | 168 | 180 | 348 | 0.80 |
| Magnus Kahnberg | RW | 587 | 169 | 168 | 337 | 0.57 |
| Patrik Carnbäck | LW | 379 | 133 | 179 | 312 | 0.82 |
| Peter Ström | F | 472 | 86 | 127 | 213 | 0.45 |
| Ronnie Sundin | D | 705 | 63 | 141 | 204 | 0.28 |
| Ove Karlsson | C | 294 | 103 | 87 | 190 | 0.64 |
| Stefan Larsson | D | 463 | 83 | 101 | 184 | 0.39 |

== Awards and honours ==
=== Team ===
Le Mat Trophy
Swedish Champions

- 1964–65, 2002–03, 2004–05, 2015–16, 2018–19

Champions Hockey League
Winners

- 2015–16, 2016–17, 2018–19, 2019–20, 2025–26

=== Individual ===
Guldpucken
The Golden Puck: Player of the year

- Ulf Sterner: 1962–63
- Gert Blomé: 1964–65
- Niklas Andersson: 2002–03
- Henrik Lundqvist: 2004–05

Guldhjälmen
The Gold Helmet: Most valuable player as judged by the league's players

- Kristian Huselius: 2000–01
- Niklas Andersson: 2002–03
- Magnus Kahnberg: 2003–04
- Henrik Lundqvist: 2004–05

Honken Trophy
Goaltender of the year

- Henrik Lundqvist: 2002–03, 2003–04, 2004–05
- Johan Holmqvist: 2008–09
- Lars Johansson: 2015–16, 2023–24

Håkan Loob Trophy
Top goal scorer

- Kristian Huselius: 2000–01
- Magnus Kahnberg: 2003–04
- Tomi Kallio: 2005–06
- Victor Olofsson: 2017–18

Skyttetrofén
Top point scorer

- Lars-Eric Lundvall: 1961–62
- Ronald Pettersson: 1962–63
- Ville Peltonen: 1997–98
- Kristian Huselius: 2000–01
- Magnus Kahnberg: 2003–04
- Ryan Lasch: 2015–16, 2018–19, 2021–22

Stefan Liv Memorial Trophy
Playoffs' most valuable player

- Johan Sundström: 2015–16
- Ryan Lasch: 2018–19

SHL Rookie of the Year

- Patrik Carnbäck: 1989–90
- Loui Eriksson: 2003–04
- Andreas Johnsson: 2013–14

Årets junior
Junior of the year in Swedish hockey

- Mikael Andersson: 1983–84
- Thomas Sjögren: 1987–88
- Niklas Andersson: 1990–91
- Henrik Lundqvist: 2001–02
- Alexander Steen: 2002–03, 2003–04
- Alexander Wennberg: 2013–14
- Rasmus Dahlin: 2017–18

Champions Hockey League MVP
Most valuable player

- Mathis Olimb: 2014–15
- Ryan Lasch: 2015–16, 2019–20
- Joel Lundqvist: 2016–17
- Max Friberg: 2025–26

Salming Trophy
Best Swedish-born defenceman

- Henrik Tömmernes: 2016–17

Rinkens riddare
Knight of the rink: The most gentlemanly player

- Lars-Eric Lundvall: 1964–65
- Lars-Erik Sjöberg: 1972–73

Swedish All star team

- Ronald Pettersson: 1961–62, 1964–65, 1965–66, 1966–67
- Ulf Sterner: 1961–62, 1962–63, 1968–69
- Gert Blomé: 1961–62, 1964–65, 1966–67
- Lars-Erik Sjöberg: 1969–70, 1971–72, 1973–74
- Thommie Bergman: 1971–72
- Kristian Huselius: 2000–01
- Henrik Lundqvist: 2002–03, 2003–04, 2004–05
- Ronnie Sundin: 2002–03
- Niklas Andersson: 2002–03
- Magnus Kahnberg: 2003–04
- Christian Bäckman: 2004–05
- Samuel Påhlsson: 2004–05
- Daniel Alfredsson: 2004–05
- Joel Lundqvist: 2015–16, 2018–19
- Lars Johansson: 2015–16
- Johan Sundström: 2015–16
- Henrik Tömmernes: 2016–17
- Max Friberg: 2023–24
- Malte Strömwall: 2023–24

Stora Grabbars Märke
Big Boys' Badge: Honorary award within Swedish sports

- Lars-Eric Lundvall #47
- Ronald Pettersson #50
- Gert Blomé #55
- Leif Henriksson #73
- Lars-Erik Sjöberg #75
- Göran Högosta #98
- Mikael Andersson #142
- Daniel Alfredsson #160
- Ronnie Sundin #161
- Joel Lundqvist #166

Coach of the Year

- Lasse Falk: 1995–96
- Conny Evensson: 2002–03
- Stephan Lundh: 2004–05

Leader of the Year

- Benny Westblom: 2004–05
- Roger Rönnberg: 2015–16
