= Swedish Ice Hockey Championship =

Annual ice hockey competition in Sweden

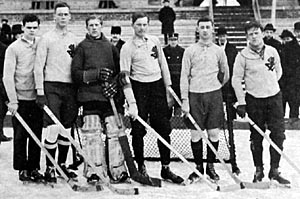
- IK Göta won the inaugural competition in 1922
- Genre: sports event
- Date: winter
- Frequency: annual
- Country: Sweden
- Inaugurated: 1922

The Swedish Ice Hockey Championship (Swedish: Svenska mästerskapet i ishockey; capitalised Swedish Championship) is a former Swedish ice hockey knockout tournament that was played every year between 1922 and 1951 and determined the Swedish ice hockey champions. The inaugural Championship winners were IK Göta. IK Göta also went on to become the tournament's most successful team, winning nine titles while the tournament was a standalone competition until 1953. After 1926 the winners were awarded the Le Mat Trophy. This trophy is currently awarded the winners of the Swedish Hockey League playoffs.

== Winners ==
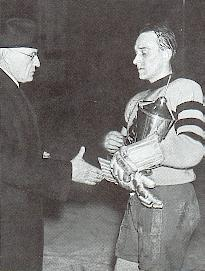
AIK's Axel Nilsson receiving the Le Mat Trophy in 1938

Season	Winners	Runners-up
1922	IK Göta (1)	Hammarby IF
1923	IK Göta (2)	Djurgårdens IF
1924	IK Göta (3)	Djurgårdens IF
1925	Södertälje SK (1)	Västerås SK
1926	Djurgårdens IF (1)	Västerås SK
1927	IK Göta (4)	Djurgårdens IF
1928	IK Göta (5)	Södertälje SK
1929	IK Göta (6)	Södertälje SK
1930	IK Göta (7)	AIK
1931	Södertälje SK (2)	Hammarby IF
1932	Hammarby IF (1)	Södertälje SK
1933	Hammarby IF (2)	IK Göta
1934	AIK (1)	Hammarby IF
1935	AIK (2)	Hammarby IF
1936	Hammarby IF (3)	AIK
1937	Hammarby IF (4)	Södertälje SK
1938	AIK (3)	Hammarby IF
1939	No competition	
1940	IK Göta (8)	AIK
1941	Södertälje SK (3)	IK Göta
1942	Hammarby IF (5)	Södertälje SK
1943	Hammarby IF (6)	IK Göta
1944	Södertälje SK (4)	Hammarby IF
1945	Hammarby IF (7)	Södertälje SK
1946	AIK (4)	Södertälje SK
1947	AIK (5)	IK Göta
1948	IK Göta (9)	UoIF Matteuspojkarna
1949	No competition	
1950	Djurgårdens IF (2)	Mora IK
1951	Hammarby IF (8)	Södertälje SK
1952	No competition	
