= 1944–45 Division 2 season (Swedish ice hockey) =

1945–55 Division 2 season
- League: (Sweden) Division 2
- Sport: Ice hockey

2nd tier Division 2 seasons
- ← 1943–44 1945–46 →

The 1944–45 season of Division 2, then the second tier of ice hockey in Sweden, consisted of 35 clubs divided into six geographical groups. The six group winners continued to qualifiers for promotion to Division 1 to replace the four teams with the poorest records in the 1944–45 Division 1 season.

The group winners were Mora IK (norra), UoIF Matteuspojkarna (östra), Västerås SK (Västmanland), Forshaga IF (västra), Södertälje IF (Sörmland), and Atlas Diesels IF (södra). Of these clubs, Mora, Västerås SK, Södertälje IF, and Atlas Diesels were promoted. Three clubs were relegated from Division 2 to play in their local district leagues for 1945–46 season, these being IFK Lidingö, IF Eyra, and GoIF Tjalve.

== Final standings ==
=== Division 2 norra ===
#	Team	GP	W	T	L	GF	GA	GD	TP	Notes
1	Mora IK	10	6	1	3	64	32	+32	13	Continues to qualifier for promotion to Division 1
2	IK Huge	10	6	1	3	58	38	+20	13	
3	Brynäs IF	10	6	1	3	49	33	+16	13	
4	Strömsbro IF	10	5	1	4	52	35	+17	11	
5	Gefle IF	10	4	1	5	39	43	–4	9	
6	Hofors IK	10	0	1	9	25	106	–81	1	

=== Division 2 östra ===
#	Team	GP	W	T	L	GF	GA	GD	TP	Notes
1	UoIF Matteuspojkarna	12	11	0	1	99	23	+76	22	Continues to qualifier for promotion to Division 1
2	Reymersholms IK	12	8	0	4	77	47	+30	16	
3	IFK Stockholm	12	8	0	4	61	37	+24	16	
4	Årsta SK	12	6	0	6	64	57	+7	12	
5	IF Vesta	12	4	0	8	41	67	–26	8	
6	IK Sirius	12	3	1	8	45	76	–31	7	
7	IFK Lidingö	12	1	1	10	17	97	–80	3	Relegated to district-level leagues for 1945–46 season

=== Division 2 västmanlandsgruppen ===
#	Team	GP	W	T	L	GF	GA	GD	TP	Notes
1	Västerås SK	8	6	1	1	72	16	+56	13	Continues to qualifier for promotion to Division 1
2	Västerås IK	8	6	1	1	65	19	+46	13	
3	IF Aros	8	5	0	3	45	26	+19	10	
4	IK Westmannia	8	1	0	7	21	81	–60	2	
5	IFK Arboga	8	1	0	7	12	73	–61	2	

=== Division 2 västra ===
#	Team	GP	W	T	L	GF	GA	GD	TP	Notes
1	Forshaga IF	10	8	1	1	49	23	+26	17	Continues to qualifier for promotion to Division 1
2	Skoghalls IF	10	8	0	2	45	22	+23	16	
3	Färjestads BK	9	4	1	4	17	25	–8	9	
4	Skiveds IF	10	3	2	5	23	29	–6	8	
5	BK Forwards	9	3	1	5	29	35	–6	7	
6	IF Eyra	10	9	1	9	18	47	–29	1	Relegated to district-level leagues for 1945–46 season

=== Division 2 sörmlandsgruppen ===
#	Team	GP	W	T	L	GF	GA	GD	TP	Notes
1	Södertälje IF	8	7	0	1	74	18	+56	14	Continues to qualifier for promotion to Division 1
2	IFK Tumba	8	6	1	1	38	16	+22	13	
3	Åkers IF	8	4	1	3	29	20	+9	9	
4	GUIF	8	1	0	7	18	54	–36	2	
5	Stallarholmens SK	8	1	0	7	19	70	–51	2	

=== Division 2 södra ===
#	Team	GP	W	T	L	GF	GA	GD	TP	Notes
1	Atlas Diesels IF	9	7	1	1	66	32	+34	15	Continues to qualifier for promotion to Division 1
2	Djurgårdens IF	10	5	2	3	39	26	+13	12	
3	IFK Norrköping	10	6	0	4	44	33	+11	12	
4	Norrköpings AIS	10	5	1	4	51	37	+14	11	
5	IK Sleipner	9	4	0	5	24	20	+4	8	
6	GoIF Tjalve	10	0	0	10	28	104	–76	0	Relegated to district-level leagues for 1945–46 season

== Promotion qualifier ==
The 1945 qualifier for promotion to Division 1 consisted of the six group winners from the 1944–45 Division 2 season. The four best teams from the qualifier were promoted to Division 1 for the 1945–46 season, replacing the four bottom teams from the 1944–45 Division 1 season (Sandvikens IF and Surahammars IF from the north group, and Skuru IK and IF Göta from the southern group). Mora IK, Västerås SK, Södertälje IF, and Atlas Diesels IF were promoted as a result of this qualifier.

== See also ==
- 1944–45 Swedish Division I season
- 1945 Swedish Ice Hockey Championship
- Division 2 (Swedish ice hockey)
- Ice hockey in Sweden
