= 1945–46 Division 2 season (Swedish ice hockey) =

- League: (Sweden) Division 2
- Sport: Ice hockey
- Number of teams: 41

2nd tier Division 2 seasons
- ← 1944–45 1946–47 →

The 1945–46 Division 2 season was the second tier of ice hockey in Sweden for 1945–46. The league consisted of 41 teams, divided into seven geographical groups of five or six teams. The seven group winners—Brynäs IF (norra), Hofors IK (Dala), Forshaga IF (västra), Åkers IF (Sörmland), IFK Stockholm (östra), Västerås IK (Västmanland), and UoIF Matteuspojkarna (södra)—continued to a promotion qualifier, which resulted in Forshaga, Åker, Västerås, and Matteuspojkarna being promoted to Division 1 for the 1946–47 season.

== Final standings ==
=== Norra ===
#	Team	GP	W	T	L	GF	GA	GD	TP	Notes
1	Brynäs IF	10	7	0	3	47	24	+23	14	Continued to 1946 Division 1 qualifier
2	Sandvikens IF	10	7	0	3	59	40	+19	14	
3	Gävle GIK	10	7	0	3	54	41	+13	14	
4	IK Huge	10	6	1	3	37	37	±0	13	
5	Gefle IF	10	1	1	8	38	72	–34	3	
6	Strömsbro IF	10	1	0	9	31	52	–21	2	

=== Dalagruppen ===
#	Team	GP	W	T	L	GF	GA	GD	TP	Notes
1	Hofors IK	10	6	2	2	41	28	+13	14	Continued to 1946 Division 1 qualifier
2	Leksands IF	10	6	1	3	42	32	+10	13	
3	IK Brage	10	5	1	4	28	26	+2	11	
4	Mora IK	10	4	1	5	22	32	–10	9	
5	Falu BS	10	3	1	6	26	40	–14	7	
6	IFK Rättvik	10	2	2	6	32	33	–1	6	

=== Västra ===
#	Team	GP	W	T	L	GF	GA	GD	TP	Notes
1	Forshaga IF	10	9	0	1	62	23	+39	18	Continued to 1946 Division 1 qualifier, promoted
2	IF Göta	10	6	1	3	47	40	+7	13	
3	IFK Bofors	10	5	0	5	36	33	+3	10	
4	Färjestads BK	10	3	1	6	27	38	–11	7	
5	Skiveds IF	10	3	0	7	28	44	–16	6	
6	Skoghalls IF	10	3	0	7	28	50	–22	6	Relegated to local district-level play

=== Sörmlandsgruppen ===
#	Team	GP	W	T	L	GF	GA	GD	TP	Notes
1	Åkers IF	10	8	0	2	68	23	+45	16	Continued to 1946 Division 1 qualifier, promoted
2	Värtans IK	10	7	0	3	73	31	+42	14	
3	Lilljanshofs IF	10	6	1	3	52	31	+21	13	
4	IFK Tumba	10	5	0	5	48	46	+2	10	
5	Skuru IK	10	3	1	6	31	32	–1	7	Relegated to local district-level play
6	Stallarholmens SK	10	0	0	10	22	131	–109	0	Relegated to local district-level play

=== Östra ===
#	Team	GP	W	T	L	GF	GA	GD	TP	Notes
1	IFK Stockholm	10	9	0	1	62	21	+41	18	Continued to 1946 Division 1 qualifier
2	IK Sirius	10	8	0	2	50	29	+21	16	
3	Årsta SK	10	7	0	3	70	34	+36	14	
4	Reymersholms IK	10	4	0	6	54	62	–8	8	
5	Djurgårdens IF	10	2	0	8	36	78	–42	4	
6	IF Vesta	10	0	0	10	24	72	–48	0	Relegated to local district-level play

=== Värmlandsgruppen ===
#	Team	GP	W	T	L	GF	GA	GD	TP	Notes
1	Västerås IK	10	9	0	1	83	21	+62	18	Continued to 1946 Division 1 qualifier, promoted
2	Surahammars IF	10	9	0	1	78	19	+59	18	
3	BK Forward	10	5	0	5	37	33	+4	10	
4	IK Westmannia	10	4	0	6	44	47	–3	8	
5	IFK Arboga	10	2	0	8	22	93	–71	4	Relegated to local district-level play
6	IK Sturehov	10	1	0	9	26	77	–51	2	Relegated to local district-level play

=== Södra ===
#	Team	GP	W	T	L	GF	GA	GD	TP	Notes
1	UoIF Matteuspojkarna	8	7	1	0	57	20	+37	15	Continued to 1946 Division 1 qualifier, promoted
2	IK Sleipner	8	5	1	2	37	22	+15	12	
3	Norrköpings AIS	8	4	0	4	16	20	–4	8	
4	IFK Norrköping	8	3	0	5	26	36	–10	6	
5	BK Derby	8	0	0	8	13	51	–38	0	
