= List of Hammarby Hockey players =

This list is about notable Hammarby Hockey players. For a list of all players with a Wikipedia article, see Hammarby Hockey players.

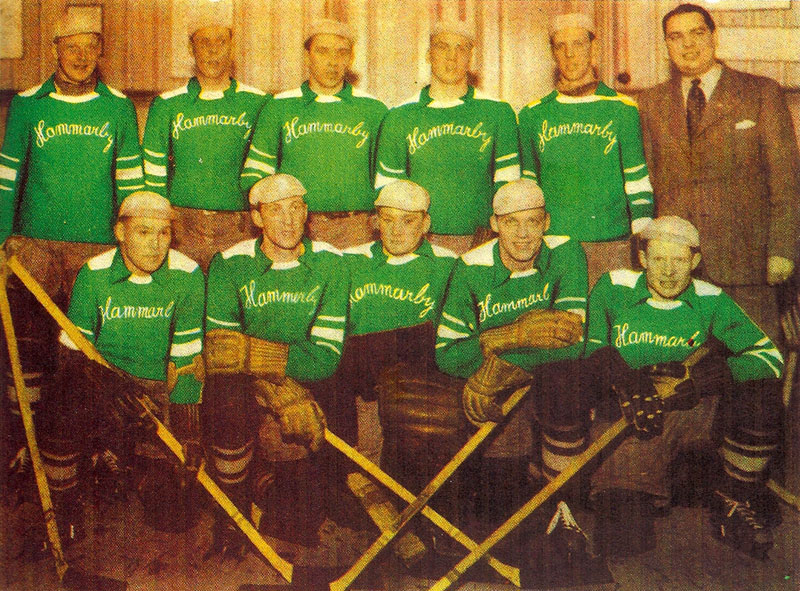
Hammarby Hockey's roster in 1944

Hammarby IF Ishockeyförening, commonly known as Hammarby Hockey, is a Swedish ice hockey club originally founded in 1921 and based in Stockholm.

They were giants in the early history of Swedish hockey, playing in the domestic top league from the birth of Swedish organized hockey in 1922 until 1957. During that period, they were crowned Swedish champions eight times (1932, 1933, 1936, 1937, 1942, 1943, 1945, and 1951) in 13 attempts. The rest of their history has been more modest, having qualified for play in Elitserien (Sweden's current top-tier league, now called the SHL) only twice.

In 2008, the team went into bankruptcy. It was immediately re-founded by supporters, being inducted into the umbrella organisation of multi-sports club Hammarby IF five years later, taking the name Hammarby IF Ishockeyförening when the legal limit had expired.

Hammarby is placed 17th in the Marathon standings for the highest division of Swedish ice hockey.

== Key ==
List criteria:

- player has won the Swedish championships with Hammarby IF, or
- has received the honorary award Stora Grabbars Märke from the Swedish Ice Hockey Association, or
- is a member of the IIHF Hall of Fame or Swedish Hockey Hall of Fame, or
- has represented the Swedish national team while at Hammarby IF, or
- has competed in the Olympic Games or World Championships, or
- has started his senior career with Hammarby IF and later played in the NHL.

== Players ==
| Name | Nationality | Position | Hammarby IF Hockey career | Titles with Hammarby IF | Individual honours | International medals |
|---|---|---|---|---|---|---|
| Erik Larsson | Sweden | Forward | 1924–1936 | 2 Swedish Championships | Stora Grabbars Märke | 1928 OG |
| Helge Johansson | Sweden | Forward | 1925–1928 | | | |
| Sture Gillström | Sweden | Defenceman | 1925–1933 | 2 Swedish Championships | | |
| Sigfrid Öberg | Sweden | Right wing | 1926–1939 | 4 Swedish Championships | Swedish Hockey Hall of Fame; Stora Grabbars Märke | 1928 OG |
| Axel Nilsson | Sweden | Defenceman | 1927–1931 | | | |
| Bertil Lundell | Sweden | Defenceman | 1929–1942 | 5 Swedish Championships | Stora Grabbars Märke | |
| Bengt Liedstrand | Sweden | Goaltender | 1929–1943 | 5 Swedish Championships | | |
| Emil Rundqvist | Sweden | Centre | 1930–1935 | 2 Swedish Championships | | |
| Ruben Carlsson | Sweden | Defenceman | 1931–1935 | 2 Swedish Championships | | |
| Lennart Hellman | Sweden | Left wing | 1932–1942 | 2 Swedish Championships | | |
| Stig Emanuel Andersson | Sweden | Right wing | 1932–1946 | 6 Swedish Championships | Stora Grabbars Märke | |
| Sven Bergqvist | Sweden | Defenceman | 1932–1935; 1936–1946 | 5 Swedish Championships | IIHF Hall of Fame; Swedish Hockey Hall of Fame; Stora Grabbars Märke | |
| Ragnar Johansson | Sweden | Forward | 1934–1945; 1946–1947 | 4 Swedish Championships | | |
| Åke Andersson | Sweden | Defenceman | 1934–1958 | 6 Swedish Championships | Swedish Hockey Hall of Fame; Stora Grabbars Märke | 1947 WC; 1951 WC; 1952 OG; 1953 WC; 1954 WC |
| Holger Nurmela | Sweden | Left wing | 1937–1950; 1955–1956 | 3 Swedish Championships | Swedish Hockey Hall of Fame; Stora Grabbars Märke | 1947 WC; 1952 OG; 1954 WC |
| Gunnar Landelius | Sweden | Defenceman | 1938–1950 | 3 Swedish Championships | | 1947 WC |
| Kurt Kjellström | Sweden | Centre | 1938–1939; 1940–1946; 1950–1951 | 3 Swedish Championships | Swedish Hockey Hall of Fame | |
| Svante Granlund | Sweden | Forward | 1940–1941; 1942–1944 | 1 Swedish Championship | | |
| Bror Pettersson | Sweden | Right wing | 1941–1956 | 3 Swedish Championships | | 1947 WC |
| Hans Hjelm | Sweden | Left wing | 1943–1948; 1949–1953; 1955–1956 | 2 Swedish Championships | | 1947 WC |
| Rune Johansson | Sweden | Defenceman | 1945–1955 | 1 Swedish Championship | Stora Grabbars Märke | 1947 WC; 1951 WC; 1952 OG; 1953 WC |
| Rolf Pettersson | Sweden | Forward | 1946–1961 | 1 Swedish Championship | Stora Grabbars Märke | 1947 WC; 1953 WC; 1954 WC |
| Lars Svensson | Sweden | Goaltender | 1955–1958 | | Stora Grabbars Märke | 1951 WC; 1952 OG |
| Hans Mild | Sweden | Left wing | 1964–1969 | | Swedish Hockey Hall of Fame; Stora Grabbars Märke | 1963 WC; 1964 OG |
| Rolf Edberg | Sweden | Centre | 1966–1970; 1983–1985 | | | 1977 WC; 1979 WC |
| Pelle Lindbergh | Sweden | Goaltender | 1976–1979 | | Swedish Hockey Hall of Fame | 1979 WC; 1980 OG |
