= 1944 Swedish Ice Hockey Championship =

The 1944 Swedish Ice Hockey Championship was the 22nd season of the Swedish Ice Hockey Championship, the national championship of Sweden. Sodertalje SK won the championship.

== Tournament ==
=== First Qualification round ===
- IF Göta Karlstad - IFK Stockholm 2:1
- IK Warpen - Strömsbro IF 3:6
- Uddens IF - Tranebergs IF (W)
- Brobergs IF - IK Huge (W)
- Forshaga IF - Atlad Diesels IF 4:2
- Wifsta/Östrands IF - IFK Nyland 4:2
- Lycksele SK - Skellefteå IF 3:10
- Brynäs IF - Sandvikens IF 6:1

=== Second Qualification round ===
- IFK Mariefred - Stallarholmens AIK 7:3
- Mora IK - Karlbergs BK 3:5
- BK Forward - IK Sleipner 0:1
- Västerås SK - Nacka SK 2:6
- Skuru IK - Djurgårdens IF 0:1
- IFK Lidingö - Matteuspojkarna 0:7
- IF Vesta - Reymersholms IK 0:6
- Södertälje IF - Årsta SK 3:2
- IF Göta Karlstad - Forshaga 7:3
- Strömsbro IF - Tranebergs IF 0:2
- Skellefteå IF - Wifsta/Östrands IF 2:5
- Brynäs IF - IK Huge 3:2

=== 1/8 Finals ===
- IF Göta Karlstad - Hammarby IF 0:7
- Södertälje IF - IK Sleipner 6:3
- Brynäs IF - Wifsta/Östrands IF 2:6
- IFK Mariefred - Nacka SK 1:5
- Södertälje SK - AIK 3:1
- Karlbergs BK - Djurgårdens IF 6:2
- IK Göta - Tranebergs IF 5:1
- UoIF Matteuspojkarna - Reymersholm IK 1:0

=== Quarterfinals ===
- Hammarby IF - Södertälje IF 7:0
- Wifsta/Östrand - Nacka SK 3:3/2:5
- Södertälje SK - Karlberg 5:2
- IK Göta - UoIF Matteuspojkarna 6:2

=== Semifinals ===
- Hammarby IF - Nacka SK 7:1
- Södertälje SK - IK Göta 3:1

=== Final ===
- Hammarby IF - Södertälje SK 2:3
