= 1941 Swedish Ice Hockey Championship =

The 1941 Swedish Ice Hockey Championship was the 19th season of the Swedish Ice Hockey Championship, the national championship of Sweden. Sodertalje SK won the championship.

== Tournament ==
=== First round ===
- IFK Lidingö - Horntulls IF 5:1
- Skuru IK - Rålambshofs IF 2:0
- IF Verdandi - IK Westmannia 4:1
- Västerås SK - IF Aros 3:2
- Surahammars IF - Stockholms IF 0:0/1:3
- IK Sleipner - UoIF Matteuspojkarna 1:9
- IFK Norrköping - Nacka SK 1:2
- Södertälje IF - Liljanshofs IF 1:3
- Tranebergs IF - Älvsjö AIK 8:1
- IF Vesta - IF Linnéa 4:2
- IK Huge - Sandvikens IF 3:2
- IK Sirius - Reymersholms IK 3:2

=== Second round ===
- IF Verdandi - IK Sture 1:2
- IK Huge - Tranebergs IF 3:2
- IFK Mariefred - IFK Lidingö 2:1
- Skuru IK - Stockholms IF 1:2

=== 1/8 Finals ===
- IK Göta - IK Sture 6:2
- Karlbergs BK - IK Hermes 3:0
- IF Vesta - Stockholms IF 4:2
- IK Huge - Hammarby IF 0:6
- AIK - Nacka SK 3:1
- IK Sirius - UoIF Matteuspojkarna 2:3
- Södertälje SK - IFK Mariefred 6:0
- Västerås SK - Liljanshofs IF 6:3

=== Quarterfinals ===
- IK Göta - Karlbergs BK 4:2
- IF Vesta - Hammarby IF 0:5
- AIK - UoIF Matteuspojkarna 1:1/4:1
- Södertälje SK - Västerås SK 5:2

=== Semifinals ===
- IK Göta - Hammarby IF 2:1
- AIK - Södertälje SK 1:2

=== Final ===
- IK Göta - Södertälje SK 2:3 n.V.
