= 1946 Swedish Ice Hockey Championship =

The 1946 Swedish Ice Hockey Championship was the 24th season of the Swedish Ice Hockey Championship, the national championship of Sweden. AIK won the championship.

== Tournament ==
=== Qualification ===
- Leksands IF - Mora IK 4:5
- IK Westmanna - Västerås SK 0:9
- Sörhaga IK - BK Dixhof (W)
- IK Warpen - Sandvikens IF (W)
- Wifsta/Östrands IF - Heffners IF 13:1
- IFK Nyland - Wifsta/Östrands IF 1:6
- IK Sleipner - BK Forward 5:2

=== First round ===
- IFK Tumba - Hammarby IF (W)
- Södertälje SK - IF Olympia 8:1
- BK Dixhof - Forshaga IF (W)
- Sundbybergs IK - Atlas Diesels IF 4:6
- IFK Mariefred - Liljanshofs IF 5:4
- Nacka SK - UoIF Matteuspojkarna 7:0
- Årsta SK - Tranebergs IF 3:9
- Skuru IK - Södertälje IF 4:3
- AIK - Reymersholms IK 10:0
- Surahammars IF - Väästerås SK 2:9
- Åkers IF - Westermalms IF 6:8
- Mora IK - Strömsbro IF 12:5
- Brynäs IF - Sandvikens IF 6:5
- IK Sleipner - Karlbergs BK 1:4
- Wifsta/Östrand - Skellefteå SK (W)

=== 1/8 Finals ===
- Forshaga IF - AIK 1:7
- Västerås SK - Skuru IK 14:2
- IFK Mariefred - Hammarby IF 3:10
- Westermalms IF - Tranebergs IF 2:6
- Södertälje SK - Nacka SK 3:2
- Wifsta/Östrands IF - Atlas Diesel 7:3
- IK Göta - Karlbergs BK 4:3
- Brynäs IF - Mora IK 2:4

=== Quarterfinals ===
- AIK - Västerås SK 7:6
- Hammarby IF - Tranebergs IF 5:3
- Södertälje SK - Wifsta/Östrands IF 14:1
- IK Göta - Mora IK 7:5

=== Semifinals ===
- AIK - Hammarby IF 4:2 n.V.
- Södertälje SK - IK Göta 3:1

=== Final ===
- AIK - Södertälje SK 5:1
