= 1945 Swedish Ice Hockey Championship =

The 1945 Swedish Ice Hockey Championship was the 23rd season of the Swedish Ice Hockey Championship, the national championship of Sweden. Hammarby IF won the championship.

== Tournament ==
=== First Qualification round ===
- Åkers IF - Stallarholmens AIF 7:1
- Södertälje IF - IFK Tumba 7:4
- Strands IF – IK Warpen 8:3
- IK Huge - Gefle IF 8:7
- Uddens IF - IF Fellows 1:4
- IF Göta Karlstad - Forshaga IF 9:0
- Sandvikens IF - Strömsbro IF 7:2
- BK Forward - IF Eyra 2:2/6:4
- Atlas Diesels IF - Stockholms IF 6:3
- Karlbergs BK - Reymersholms IK 4:0
- AIK - IFK Lidingö 10:1
- Tranebergs IF - Årsta SK 4:3
- Västerås SK - IF Aros 5:3
- Skuru IK - IFK Stockholm 0:6

=== Second Qualification round ===
- Skellefteå IF - IFK Nyland 4:3
- Wifsta/Östrands IF - Strands IF 4:3
- Sörhaga IK - IF Fellows 4:3
- IFK Mariefred - Åkers IF 7:2
- Brynäs IF - IK Huge 4:5
- Mora IK - Sandvikens IF 6:5
- IF Göta Karlstad - BJ Forward 4:0
- VIK Västerås HK - Västerås SK 3:5
- UoIF Matteuspojkarna - Södertälje IF 9:3
- Tranebergs IF - Atlas Diesel 5:3
- IFK Stockholm - Karlbergs BK 0:3
- IF Vesta - AIK (W)

=== 1/8 Finals ===
- Hammarby IF - Västerås SK 10:3
- Wifsta/Östrands IF - Skellefteå IF 6:4
- IK Göta - Nacka SK 3:2
- Karlbergs BK - Mora IK 6:2
- Södertälje SK - Tranebergs IF 10:2
- UoIF Matteuspojkarna - IFK Mariefred 6:3
- AIK - IK Huge 18:3
- IF Göta Karlstad - Sörhaga IK 8:1

=== Quarterfinals ===
- Hammarby IF - Wifsta/Östrands IF 6:0
- IK Göta - Karlbergs BK 4:3
- Södertälje SK - UoIF Matteuspojkarna 3:0
- AIK - IF Göta Karlstad 17:0

=== Semifinals ===
- Hammarby IF - IK Göta 4:3 n.V.
- Södertälje SK - AIK 6:3 n.V.

=== Final ===
- Hammarby IF - Södertälje SK 3:2 n.V.
