= 1950 Swedish Ice Hockey Championship =

The 1950 Swedish Ice Hockey Championship was the 27th season of the Swedish Ice Hockey Championship, the national championship of Sweden. Djurgardens IF won the championship.

== Tournament ==
=== Qualification ===
- Ljusne AIK - Kungliga Hälsinge Flygflottilj F-15 Söderhamn 4:3
- Åkers IF - Liljanshof 3:2
- Piteå IF - Wifsta/Östrand 5:2
- BK Forward - Surahammar 3:2
- IFK Bofors - IK Sturehov 9:4
- Tranås AIF - IFK Norrköping 3:5
- IFK Nyland - Leksand 5:3
- Södertälje IF - Traneberg 6:4
- Hagalunds IS - Karlberg 7:2
- Sundbybergs IK - Årsta SK 5:4
- Mora IK - Ljusne AIK 12:3

=== First round ===
- Åkers IF - Södertälje IF 6:3
- IFK Bofors - IFK Nyland 4:0
- Mora IK - Piteå IF 7:5
- IFK Norrköping - BK Forward 5:2
- Hagalund - Sundbyberg 2:3
- IFK Norrköping - Atlas Diesel 3:2

=== Second round ===
- AIK - IFK Norrköping (W)
- Hammarby IF - IK Huge 3:1
- IFK Bofors - Djurgårdens IF 4:11
- Forshaga IF - Åkers IF 8:1
- IK Göta - Nacka SK 2:1
- UoIF Matteuspojkarna - Sundbyberg 4:3
- Gävle GIK - Mora IK 4:5
- Södertälje SK - Västerås SK (W)

=== Quarterfinals ===
- AIK - Hammarby IF 2:3
- Djurgårdens IF - Forshaga IF (W)
- IK Göta - UoIF Matteuspojkarna 4:2
- Mora IK - Södertälje SK 6:1

=== Semifinals ===
- Hammarby IF - Djurgårdens IF 1:3
- IK Göta - Mora IK 3:4

=== Final ===
- Djurgårdens IF - Mora IK 7:2
