= 1948 Swedish Ice Hockey Championship =

The 1948 Swedish Ice Hockey Championship was the 26th season of the Swedish Ice Hockey Championship, the national championship of Sweden. IK Göta won the championship.

== Tournament ==
=== First Qualification round ===
- Tegs SK - Clemensnäs IF 1:9
- Piteå IF - Wifsta/Östrands IF 5:5/5:11

=== Second Qualification round ===
- IF Fellows - Forshaga IF 0:6
- Clemensnäs IF - IK Warpen 4:3
- Wifsta/Östrand - IFK Nyland 6:3

=== First round ===
- IK Sturehov - Tranebergs IF (W)
- IK Sirius - Hofors IK 3:2
- IFK Mariefred - Nacka SK 3:6
- Åkers IF - Djurgårdens IF (W)
- Forshaga IF - Atlas Diesel 13:4
- Wifsta/Östrands IF - Clemensnäs IF 2:5
- Västerås SK - Surahammars IF 3:6
- IF Olympia - Karlbergs BK 2:4

=== Second round ===
- Tranebergs IF - Clemensnäs IF 3:4
- Forshaga IF - IK Göta 4:5
- Surahammars IF - AIK 3:8
- Hammarby IF - Karlbergs BK 6:0
- Mora IK - Gävle GIK 4:7
- VIK Västerås HK - Djurgårdens IF 1:16
- UoIF Matteuspojkarna - Nacka SK 4:3
- IK Sirius - Södertälje SK 3:10

=== Quarterfinals ===
- Clemensnäs IF - IK Göta 3:6
- AIK - Hammarby IF 3:2
- Gävle GIK - Djurgårdens IF 4:3
- UoIF Matteuspojkarna - Södertälje SK 4:3

=== Semifinals ===
- IK Göta - AIK 5:3
- Gävle GIK - UoIF Matteuspojkarna 5:7

=== Final ===
- IK Göta - UoIF Matteuspojkarna 3:2 n.V.
