= 1947 Swedish Ice Hockey Championship =

The 1947 Swedish Ice Hockey Championship was the 25th season of the Swedish Ice Hockey Championship, the national championship of Sweden. AIK won the championship.

== Tournament ==
=== Qualification ===
- Åkers IF - IK Sleipner 3:8
- IFK Nyland - Hofors IK 5:6
- Wifsta-Östrand - IK Warpen 6:1
- BK Forward - UoIF Matteuspojkarna 4:13
- VIK Västerås HK - Nacka SK 6:3

=== Round of 16 ===
- Mora IK - IK Sirius 9:1
- AIK - VIK Västerås HK 10:2
- Hofors IK - Wifsta/Östrands IF 2:3
- Södertälje SK - IFK Mariefred 10:2
- Ljungby IF - Karlbergs BK 1:7
- Hammarby IF - UoIF Matteuspojkarna 4:3
- IK Sleipner - IK Göta 0:5
- Forshaga IF - Västerås SK 7:8

=== Quarterfinals ===
- Mora IK - AIK 2:6
- Wifsta/Östrands IF - Södertälje SK 1:6
- Karlbergs IF - Hammarby IF 4:6
- IK Göta - Västerås SK 9:4

=== Semifinals ===
- AIK - Södertälje SK 3:2
- Hammarby IF - IK Göta 2:2/1:2

=== Final ===
- AIK - IK Göta 3:2
