= 1942 Swedish Ice Hockey Championship =

The 1942 Swedish Ice Hockey Championship was the 20th season of the Swedish Ice Hockey Championship, the national championship of Sweden. Hammarby IF won the championship.

== Tournament ==
=== First Qualification round ===
- IF Fellows - Uddens IF 1:0
- IK Huge - Sandvikens IF 1:7

=== Second Qualification round ===
- Sörhaga IK - IF Fellows 2:1
- Brynäs IF - Sandvikens IF 4:3

=== First round ===
- Skuru IK - Karlbergs BK 0:1
- Nacka SK - Horntulls IF 3:1
- AIK - Rålambshofs IF 9:0
- IK Hermes - Djurgårdens IF 3:1
- IF Göta Karlstad - Sörhaga IK 4:0
- Brynäs IF - Mora IK 8:3
- GIF Sundsvall - IFK Nyland 1:9
- IK Sirius - IF Vesta 1:5
- VIK Västerås HK - IF Aros 2:3
- IFK Norrköping - IK Sleipner 3:0
- Matteuspojkarna - IK Sture 11:0

=== 1/8 Finals ===
- IFK Mariefred - AIK 2:6
- Brynäs IF - IFK Nyland 2:10
- Hammarby IF - IK Hermes 5:0
- IF Vesta - Nacka SK 3:3/3:4
- IF Göta Karlstad - Karlbergs BK 0:6
- IFK Norrköping - IK Göta 3:13
- IF Aros - Reymersholms IK 1:4
- Södertälje SK - UoIF Matteuspojkarna 5:2

=== Quarterfinals ===
- AIK - IFK Nyland 2:1
- Hammarby IF - Nacka SK 4:1
- Karlbergs BK - IK Göta 4:2
- Reymersholms IK - Södertälje SK 0:2

=== Semifinals ===
- AIK - Hammarby IF 0:4
- Karlbergs BK - Södertälje SK 0:2

=== Final ===
- Hammarby IF - Södertälje SK 3:0
