= 1935 Swedish Ice Hockey Championship =

The 1935 Swedish Ice Hockey Championship was the 14th season of the Swedish Ice Hockey Championship, the national championship of Sweden. AIK won the championship.

== Tournament ==
=== First round ===
- Tranebergs IF – UoIF Matteuspojkarna 1:0
- IK Göta – BK Nordia 9:0
- Nacka SK – IF Johanniterpojkarna 2:0
- Södertälje SK – IFK Mariefred 1:0
- IK Hermes – Södertälje IF 8:1

=== Quarterfinals ===
- Hammarby IF – Nacka SK 10:0
- Karlbergs BK – IK Göta 3:1
- AIK – IK Hermes 1:0
- Tranebergs IF – Södertälje SK 1:0

=== Semifinals ===
- Hammarby IF – Karlbergs BK 8:0
- AIK – Tranebergs IF 6:0

=== Final ===
- Hammarby IF – AIK 1:2 n.V.
