= 1933 Swedish Ice Hockey Championship =

The 1933 Swedish Ice Hockey Championship was the 12th season of the Swedish Ice Hockey Championship, the national championship of Sweden. Hammarby IF won the championship.

== Tournament ==
=== First round ===
- BK Nordia - Lilljanshofs IF 2:1
- Nacka SK - UoIF Matteuspojkarna 2:1
- Reymersholms IK - Södertälje IF 3:1
- Karlbergs BK - Tranebergs IF 7:3
- Stockholms IF - IFK Mariefred 6:1

=== Second round ===
- Karlbergs BK - Reymersholms IK 2:1
- Djurgårdens IF - Nacka SK 1:0
- Stockholms IF - BK Nordia 0:0/1:0

=== Quarterfinals ===
- Hammarby IF - Stockholms IF 7:1
- IK Hermes - Södertälje SK 1:1/1:2
- AIK - Karlbergs BK 1:0
- IK Göta - Djurgårdens IF 2:1

=== Semifinals ===
- Hammarby IF - Södertälje SK 5:0
- AIK - IK Göta 0:1

=== Final ===
- Hammarby IF - IK Göta 3:1
