= 1947–48 Swedish Division I season =

Swedish ice hockey season

The 1947–48 Swedish Division I season was the fourth season of Swedish Division I. Sodertalje SK defeated Hammarby IF in the league final, 2 games to none.

== Regular season ==
=== Northern Group ===
	Team	GP	W	T	L	+/-	P
1	Södertälje SK	10	9	0	1	63–22	18
2	AIK	10	6	1	3	54–34	13
3	UoIF Matteuspojkarna	10	5	0	5	50–55	10
4	Mora IK	10	3	1	6	22–28	7
5	Västerås SK	10	2	3	5	46–66	7
6	Tranebergs IF	10	2	1	7	34–65	5

=== Southern Group ===
	Team	GP	W	T	L	+/-	P
1	Hammarby IF	10	7	2	1	66–27	16
2	Västerås IK	10	4	3	3	48–54	11
3	Gävle GIK	10	4	2	4	37–35	10
4	IK Göta	10	4	2	4	34–39	10
5	Atlas Diesels IF	10	4	1	5	45–34	9
6	Nacka SK	10	1	2	7	27–59	4

== Final ==
- Hammarby IF – Södertälje SK 2–6, 1–6
