= 1937 Swedish Ice Hockey Championship =

The 1937 Swedish Ice Hockey Championship was the 16th season of the Swedish Ice Hockey Championship, the national championship of Sweden. Hammarby IF won the championship.

== Tournament ==
=== First round ===
- Nacka SK - UoIF Matteuspojkarna 3:1
- Tranebergs IF - Hornstulls IF 3:2
- Södertälje SK - BK Nordia 4:0

=== Second round ===
- Södertälje IF - IFK Mariefred 3:2
- Karlbergs BK - IK Sture 2:1
- Nacka SK - Lidingö IF 4:0
- Södertälje SK - Tranebergs IF 3:1

=== Quarterfinals ===
- Södertälje IF - Nacka SK 4:0
- Hammarby IF - IK Göta 3:0
- AIK - IK Hermes 1:0
- Södertälje SK - Karlbergs BK 3:1

=== Semifinals ===
- Södertälje IF - Hammarby IF 0:1
- AIK - Södertälje SK 1:3

=== Final ===
- Hammarby IF - Södertälje SK 1:0
