= 1932 Swedish Ice Hockey Championship =

The 1932 Swedish Ice Hockey Championship was the 11th season of the Swedish Ice Hockey Championship, the national championship of Sweden. Hammarby IF won the championship.

== Tournament ==
=== Qualification ===
- Hammarby IF - Djurgårdshofs IF 8:1
- Karlbergs BK - UoIF Matteuspojkarna 4:0
- IK Hermes - Lilljanshofs IF 2:0
- Nacka SK - Tranebergs IF 3:0
- Södertälje SK - Djurgårdens IF 0:0/2:1
- AIK - IFK Mariefred 9:0
- IK Göta - IFK Stockholm 4:0

=== Quarterfinals ===
- Hammarby IF - Karlbergs BK 3:2
- IK Hermes - Nacka SK 2:1
- Södertälje SK - Södertälje IF 2:0
- AIK - IK Göta 4:1

=== Semifinals ===
- Hammarby IF - IK Hermes 6:3
- Södertälje SK - AIK 1:0 n.V.

=== Final ===
- Hammarby IF - Södertälje SK 2:1 n.V.
