= 1952–53 Swedish Division I season =

1952-53 Swedish ice hockey division I season, won by Sodertalje SK

The 1952–53 Swedish Division I season was the ninth season of Swedish Division I ice hockey. Sodertalje SK defeated Hammarby IF in the league final, 1 game to none, 1 tie.

== Regular season ==
=== Northern Group ===
	Team	GP	W	T	L	+/-	P
1	Hammarby IF	10	10	0	0	44–14	20
2	Leksands IF	10	7	0	3	64–27	14
3	Gävle GIK	10	5	1	4	30–32	11
4	Atlas Diesels IF	10	2	2	6	27–46	6
5	AIK	10	2	1	7	37–43	5
6	IK Huge	10	2	0	8	27–67	4

=== Southern Group ===
	Team	GP	W	T	L	+/-	P
1	Södertälje SK	10	8	2	0	61–18	18
2	Djurgårdens IF	10	7	2	1	67–20	16
3	IFK Bofors	10	4	3	3	37–41	11
4	Surahammars IF	10	3	2	5	30–52	8
5	Forshaga IF	10	2	0	8	30–65	4
6	Nacka SK	10	0	3	7	29–58	3

== Final ==
- Hammarby IF – Södertälje SK 2–2, 1–5
