= 1927 Klass I season =

Swedish ice hockey league season

The 1927 Klass I season was the fifth season of the Klass I, the top level of ice hockey in Sweden. This was the last season of the Klass I, it was replaced by the Elitserien for 1927–28. IK Göta won the league championship.

== Final standings ==
	Team	GP	W	T	L	+/-	P
1	IK Göta	7	6	1	0	48 - 7	13
2	Södertälje SK	7	6	1	0	22 - 4	13
3	Hammarby IF	7	4	1	2	21 - 9	9
4	Lidingö IF	7	4	0	3	22 - 28	8
5	IF Linnéa	7	3	0	3	10 - 20	6
6	Nacka SK	7	1	2	4	12 - 29	4
7	IFK Stockholm	7	0	2	5	6 - 25	2
8	Tranebergs IF	7	0	1	6	6 - 25	1
