= 1936 Swedish Ice Hockey Championship =

The 1936 Swedish Ice Hockey Championship was the 15th season of the Swedish Ice Hockey Championship, the national championship of Sweden. Hammarby IF won the championship.

== Tournament ==
=== First round ===
- IK Göta - IK Sture 2:1
- Södertälje SK - IFK Mariefred 1:1/4:0
- IK Hermes - Djurgårdshofs IF 9:0
- Södertälje IF - UoIF Matteuspojkarna 3:1

=== Quarterfinals ===
- AIK - Tranebergs IF 4:0
- IK Göta - Södertälje SK 4:1
- Hammarby IF - Karlbergs BK 4:0
- IK Hermes - Södertälje IF 4:1

=== Semifinals ===
- AIK - IK Göta 3:1
- Hammarby IF - IK Hermes 4:1

=== Final ===
- AIK - Hammarby IF 1:1 n.V./1:5
