= 1943 Swedish Ice Hockey Championship =

The 1943 Swedish Ice Hockey Championship was the 21st season of the Swedish Ice Hockey Championship, the national championship of Sweden. Hammarby IF won the championship.

== Tournament ==
=== Qualification ===
- BK Forward - Nacka SK 1:4
- Forshaga IF - Tranebergs IF 0:2
- Mora IK - Brobergs IF 5:3
- Wifsta/Östrands IF - IFK Nyland 4:1
- Brynäs IF - IF Vesta 9:2
- IF Verrdandi - Norrköpings AIS (W)
- Surahammars IF - UoIF Matteuspojkarna 0:3
- AIK - VIK Västerås HK 5:2

=== First round ===
- AIK - Norrköpings AIS (W)
- Mora IK - Brynäs IF 1:0
- Karlbergs BK - Nacka SK 1:5
- Wifsta/Östrands IF - IK Göta 0:1
- Reymersholms IK - Årsta SK 2:3
- Tranebergs IF - UoIF Matteuspojkarna 2:3

=== Quarterfinals ===
- Mora IK - Hammarby IF 1:7
- UoIF Matteuspojkarna - Södertälje SK 4:6
- Årsta SK - IK Göta 1:8
- Nacka SK - AIK 3:7

=== Semifinals ===
- Hammarby IF - Södertälje SK 3:2
- IK Göta - AIK 4:3

=== Final ===
- Hammarby IF - IK Göta 4:1
