= 1934 Swedish Ice Hockey Championship =

The 1934 Swedish Ice Hockey Championship was the 13th season of the Swedish Ice Hockey Championship, the national championship of Sweden. AIK won the championship.

== Tournament ==
=== First round ===
- Karlbergs BK - Södertälje IF 3:1
- Södertälje SK - IK Sture 2:1
- UoIF Matteuspojkarna - IK Hermes 2:0
- Reymersholms IK - IK Göta 5:4
- AIK - Djurgårdens IF 6:1
- Nacka SK - IFK Mariefred 1:0
- IFK Stockholm - Lilljanshofs IF 2:1

=== Quarterfinals ===
- AIK - IFK Stockholm 3:0
- Karlbergs BK - UoIF Matteuspojkarna 2:0
- Hammarby IF - Södertälje SK 2:1
- Nacka SK - Reymersholms IK 1:0

=== Semifinals ===
- AIK - Karlbergs BK 1:0
- Hammarby IF - Nacka SK 1:0

=== Final ===
- AIK - Hammarby IF 1:0
