= 1924 Klass I season =

Swedish ice hockey league season

The 1924 Klass I season was the second season of the Klass I, the top level of ice hockey in Sweden. The league championship was won by Djurgårdens IF.

== Final standings ==
	Team	GP	W	T	L	+/-	P
1	Djurgårdens IF	6	4	2	0	26 - 10	10
2	IF Linnéa	6	4	2	0	20 - 10	10
3	Hammarby IF	6	4	1	1	31 - 12	9
4	IF Sankt Erik	6	2	1	3	17 - 20	5
5	IFK Stockholm	6	2	0	4	9 - 27	4
6	Nacka SK	6	1	0	5	18 - 20	2
7	Tranebergs IF	6	1	0	5	8 - 26	2
