= 1959–60 Swedish Division I season =

Swedish ice hockey season

The 1959–60 Swedish Division I season was the 16th season of Swedish Division I. Djurgårdens IF won the league title by finishing first in the Swedish championship series.

== Division I North ==
	Team	GP	W	T	L	+/-	P
1	Gävle GIK	14	11	2	1	84–26	24
2	Skellefteå AIK	14	12	0	2	82–30	24
3	Leksands IF	14	10	0	4	76–41	20
4	Wifsta/Östrands IF	14	5	1	8	61–53	11
5	Hammarby IF	14	5	0	9	51–75	10
6	Strömsbro IF	14	3	2	9	44–75	10
7	Nacka SK	14	4	0	10	36–85	8
8	Rönnskärs IF	14	3	1	10	38–87	4

== Division I South ==
	Team	GP	W	T	L	+/-	P
1	Djurgårdens IF	14	12	2	0	97–32	26
2	Södertälje SK	14	10	0	4	104–48	20
3	IFK Bofors	14	8	1	5	61–61	17
4	Forshaga IF	14	7	1	6	75–89	15
5	Grums IK	14	5	2	7	51–60	12
6	Västerås IK	14	5	0	9	51–66	10
7	Västra Frölunda IF	14	4	0	10	54–104	8
8	Karlbergs BK	14	2	0	12	43–76	4

== Swedish championship series ==
	Team	GP	W	T	L	+/-	P
1	Djurgårdens IF	6	5	0	1	28–18	10
2	Södertälje SK	6	3	0	3	30–24	6
3	Skellefteå AIK	6	3	0	3	22–23	6
4	Gävle GIK	6	1	0	5	19–34	2
