= 1945–46 Swedish Division I season =

Swedish ice hockey season

The 1945–46 Swedish Division I season was the second season of Swedish Division I. Hammarby IF defeated Sodertalje SK in the league final, 2 games to 1.

== Regular season ==
=== Northern Group ===
	Team	GP	W	T	L	+/-	P
1	Södertälje SK	10	8	0	2	70–23	16
2	AIK	10	8	0	2	52–30	16
3	Karlbergs BK	10	7	0	3	42–36	14
4	Mora IK	10	2	2	6	30–52	6
5	Atlas Diesels IF	10	2	1	7	32–71	5
6	Tranebergs IF	10	1	1	8	29–48	3

=== Southern Group ===
	Team	GP	W	T	L	+/-	P
1	Hammarby IF	10	9	1	0	89–26	19
2	IK Göta	10	6	2	2	52–35	14
3	Nacka SK	10	5	0	5	68–41	10
4	IFK Mariefred	10	3	2	5	51–60	8
5	Västerås SK	10	3	2	5	42–54	6
6	Södertälje IF	10	0	1	9	27–113	1

== Final ==
- Hammarby IF – Södertälje SK 2–1, 1–5, 2–0
