= 1925 Klass I season =

Swedish ice hockey league season

The 1925 Klass I season was the third season of the Klass I, the top level of ice hockey in Sweden. IK Göta won the league championship, finishing undefeated.

== Final standings ==
	Team	GP	W	T	L	+/-	P
1	IK Göta	6	4	0	0	21 - 1	8
2	Nacka SK	2	2	0	0	6 - 1	4
3	IFK Stockholm	2	2	0	0	7 - 3	4
4	Hammarby IF	1	1	0	0	6 - 2	2
5	IF Saint Erik	3	1	0	2	6 - 7	2
6	Djurgårdens IF	3	1	0	2	3 - 6	2
7	IF Linnéa	2	0	0	2	1 - 6	0
8	AIK	2	0	0	2	3 - 15	0
9	Tranebergs IF	3	0	0	3	4 - 16	0
