= 1926 Klass I season =

Swedish ice hockey league season

The 1926 Klass I season was the fourth season of the Klass I, the top level of ice hockey in Sweden. It was won by Södertälje SK.

== Final standings ==
| | Team | GP | W | T | L | +/- | P |
|---|---|---|---|---|---|---|---|
| 1 | Södertälje SK | 7 | 4 | 3 | 0 | 18 - 6 | 11 |
| 2 | IK Göta | 7 | 4 | 3 | 0 | 22 - 8 | 11 |
| 3 | Hammarby IF | 7 | 4 | 3 | 0 | 16 - 8 | 11 |
| 4 | IFK Stockholm | 7 | 2 | 3 | 2 | 21 - 16 | 7 |
| 5 | IF Linnéa | 7 | 2 | 3 | 3 | 10 - 16 | 6 |
| 6 | Tranebergs IF | 7 | 1 | 3 | 3 | 10 - 24 | 5 |
| 7 | Nacka SK | 7 | 1 | 1 | 5 | 9 - 20 | 3 |
| 8 | Djurgårdens IF | 7 | 1 | 0 | 6 | 12 - 20 | 2 |
