= 1951–52 Swedish Division I season =

Swedish ice hockey season

The 1951–52 Swedish Division I season was the eighth season of Swedish Division I. Sodertalje SK defeated Gavel GIK in the league final, 2 games to none.

== Regular season ==
=== Northern Group ===
	Team	GP	W	T	L	+/-	P
1	Gävle GIK	10	7	2	1	41–19	16
2	Hammarby IF	10	7	1	2	48–23	15
3	AIK	10	6	2	2	52–31	14
4	Nacka SK	10	3	1	6	26–57	7
4	Mora IK	10	2	1	7	37–53	5
5	UoIF Matteuspojkarna	10	1	1	8	27–48	3

=== Southern Group ===
	Team	GP	W	T	L	+/-	P
1	Södertälje SK	10	8	2	0	53–19	18
2	Djurgårdens IF	10	6	1	3	46–27	13
3	Leksands IF	10	5	1	4	40–38	11
4	Forshaga IF	10	4	0	6	38–56	8
5	Grums IK	10	2	1	7	25–43	5
6	IK Göta	10	2	1	7	39–58	5

== Final ==
- Södertälje SK – Gävle GIK 4–1, 4–2
