= 1931 Swedish Ice Hockey Championship =

The 1931 Swedish Ice Hockey Championship was the 10th season of the Swedish Ice Hockey Championship, the national championship of Sweden. Sodertalje SK won the championship.

== Tournament ==
=== Qualification ===
- Nacka SK - UoIF Matteuspojkarna 1:1/3:0
- Hammarby IF - Tranebergs IF 7:0
- Lilijanshofs IF - IFK Stockholm 3:1

=== Quarterfinals ===
- Djurgårdens IF - Nacka SK 2:1
- Hammarby IF - Lilijanshofs IF 4:0
- AIK - Karlbergs BK 3:0
- Södertälje SK - IK Göta 5:0

=== Semifinals ===
- Djurgårdens IF - Hammarby IF 1:2
- AIK - Södertälje SK 0:1

=== Final ===
- Hammarby IF - Södertälje SK 0:2
