= 1923 Klass I season =

Swedish ice hockey league season

The 1923 Klass I season was the first season of the Klass I, the top level ice hockey league in Sweden. IK Göta won the league championship, as they finished first in the league table.

== Final standings ==
	Team	GP	W	T	L	+/-	P
1	IK Göta	5	4	1	0	27 - 11	9
2	Djurgårdens IF	5	3	1	1	22 - 13	7
3	Hammarby IF	5	3	0	2	17 - 10	6
4	IFK Stockholm	5	2	2	1	16 - 13	6
5	Nacka SK	5	1	0	4	15 - 28	2
6	IF Linnéa	5	0	0	5	7 - 29	0
