= 1958–59 Swedish Division I season =

Swedish ice hockey season

The 1958–59 Swedish Division I season was the 15th season of Swedish Division I. Djurgårdens IF won the league title by finishing first in the Swedish championship series.

== Division I North ==
	Team	GP	W	T	L	+/-	P
1	Leksands IF	14	11	1	2	64–29	23
2	Gävle GIK	14	10	1	3	83–52	21
3	Skellefteå AIK	14	9	2	3	52–35	20
4	Strömsbro IF	14	7	1	6	58–60	15
5	Wifsta/Östrands IF	14	4	4	6	47–50	12
6	Hammarby IF	14	4	2	8	42–62	10
7	Mora IK	14	4	1	9	62–80	9
8	Alfredshems IK	14	0	2	12	29–70	4

== Division I South ==
	Team	GP	W	T	L	+/-	P
1	Djurgårdens IF	14	14	0	0	107–33	28
2	Grums IK	14	10	1	3	70–33	21
3	Södertälje SK	14	9	2	3	67–48	20
4	Västerås IK	14	6	1	7	60–79	13
5	Forshaga IF	14	5	2	7	52–62	12
6	IFK Bofors	14	4	1	9	49–63	9
7	AIK	14	2	1	11	52–80	5
8	Malmö FF	14	1	2	11	40–99	4

== Swedish championship series ==
	Team	GP	W	T	L	+/-	P
1	Djurgårdens IF	6	5	1	0	28–8	11
2	Leksands IF	6	4	0	2	19–23	8
3	Grums IK	6	2	0	4	20–24	4
4	Gävle GIK	6	0	1	5	18–30	1
