= 1979–80 Division 1 season (Swedish ice hockey) =

- League: Division 1
- Sport: Ice hockey
- Number of teams: 40
- Promoted to Division 1: Södertälje SK to Elitserien
- Relegated to Division 2: CRIF; Östersunds IK; IK Viking; Fagersta AIK; Åkers IF; Linköpings HC; Tibro IK; Halmstads HK

Division 1 seasons
- ← 1978–79 1980–81 →

1979–80 was the fifth season that Division 1 operated as the second tier of ice hockey in Sweden, below the top-flight Elitserien (now the Swedish Hockey League).

Division 1 was divided into four starting groups, based on geography. The top four teams in the group would continue to the playoffs to determine which clubs would participate in the qualifier for promotion to Elitserien. The bottom two teams in each group were relegated to Division 2 for the 1980–81 season.

== Regular season ==
=== Northern Group ===
| | Club | GP | W | T | L | GF | GA | Pts |
|---|---|---|---|---|---|---|---|---|
| 1. | Timrå IK | 27 | 23 | 3 | 1 | 194 | 94 | 49 |
| 2. | Kiruna AIF | 27 | 19 | 3 | 5 | 149 | 66 | 41 |
| 3. | Luleå HF | 27 | 20 | 1 | 6 | 162 | 99 | 41 |
| 4. | IFK Kiruna | 27 | 12 | 3 | 12 | 148 | 158 | 27 |
| 5. | Bodens BK | 27 | 9 | 4 | 14 | 119 | 126 | 22 |
| 6. | Piteå IF | 27 | 7 | 5 | 15 | 129 | 151 | 19 |
| 7. | Järveds IF | 27 | 9 | 1 | 17 | 124 | 181 | 19 |
| 8. | Kågedalens AIF | 27 | 6 | 6 | 15 | 105 | 136 | 18 |
| 9. | CRIF | 27 | 8 | 2 | 17 | 97 | 154 | 18 |
| 10. | Östersunds IK | 27 | 6 | 4 | 17 | 104 | 164 | 16 |

=== Eastern Group ===
| | Club | GP | W | T | L | GF | GA | Pts |
|---|---|---|---|---|---|---|---|---|
| 1. | Örebro IK | 36 | 30 | 2 | 4 | 304 | 153 | 62 |
| 2. | Södertälje SK | 36 | 25 | 4 | 7 | 235 | 139 | 54 |
| 3. | Hammarby IF | 36 | 22 | 5 | 9 | 187 | 117 | 49 |
| 4. | Västerås IK | 36 | 18 | 7 | 11 | 162 | 146 | 43 |
| 5. | Almtuna IS | 36 | 18 | 3 | 15 | 160 | 139 | 39 |
| 6. | Huddinge IK | 36 | 15 | 6 | 15 | 161 | 167 | 36 |
| 7. | Väsby IK | 36 | 14 | 4 | 18 | 171 | 171 | 32 |
| 8. | NSA-76 | 36 | 10 | 7 | 19 | 125 | 155 | 27 |
| 9. | Åkers IF | 36 | 4 | 3 | 29 | 96 | 246 | 11 |
| 10. | Linköpings HC | 36 | 2 | 3 | 31 | 120 | 288 | 7 |

=== Southern Group ===
| | Club | GP | W | T | L | GF | GA | Pts |
|---|---|---|---|---|---|---|---|---|
| 1. | IFK Bäcken | 27 | 19 | 4 | 4 | 160 | 95 | 42 |
| 2. | Karlskrona IK | 27 | 16 | 4 | 7 | 119 | 97 | 36 |
| 3. | IF Troja | 27 | 17 | 0 | 10 | 145 | 114 | 34 |
| 4. | Nybro IF | 27 | 15 | 3 | 9 | 117 | 88 | 33 |
| 5. | Mörrums GoIS | 27 | 11 | 3 | 13 | 117 | 130 | 25 |
| 6. | Tingsryds AIF | 27 | 10 | 4 | 13 | 108 | 116 | 24 |
| 7. | Malmö IF | 27 | 9 | 5 | 13 | 122 | 129 | 23 |
| 8. | Gislaveds SK | 27 | 10 | 1 | 16 | 131 | 134 | 21 |
| 9. | Tibro IK | 27 | 7 | 5 | 15 | 100 | 151 | 19 |
| 10. | Halmstads HK | 27 | 4 | 5 | 18 | 94 | 159 | 13 |

=== Western Group ===
| | Club | GP | W | T | L | GF | GA | Pts |
|---|---|---|---|---|---|---|---|---|
| 1. | Mora IK | 27 | 24 | 0 | 3 | 234 | 73 | 48 |
| 2. | Bofors IK | 27 | 20 | 2 | 5 | 190 | 99 | 42 |
| 3. | Strömsbro IF | 27 | 16 | 4 | 7 | 157 | 130 | 36 |
| 4. | IK Rommehed | 27 | 15 | 3 | 9 | 149 | 119 | 33 |
| 5. | Malungs IF | 27 | 13 | 1 | 13 | 115 | 108 | 27 |
| 6. | Falu IF | 27 | 12 | 3 | 12 | 115 | 126 | 27 |
| 7. | Avesta BK | 27 | 9 | 3 | 15 | 113 | 160 | 21 |
| 8. | Hofors IK | 27 | 9 | 2 | 16 | 98 | 152 | 20 |
| 9. | IK Viking | 27 | 4 | 1 | 22 | 63 | 182 | 9 |
| 10. | Fagersta AIK | 27 | 2 | 3 | 22 | 74 | 159 | 7 |

== Playoffs ==
=== North/East ===
==== First round ====
- Timrå IK - Hammarby IF 1:2 (4:0, 2:4, 3:4)
- Kiruna AIF - Västerås IK 2:1 (13:3, 1:6, 4:1)
- Örebro IK - Luleå HF 0:2 (2:4, 5:6)
- Södertälje SK - IFK Kiruna 2:0 (12:4, 16:4)

==== Second round ====
- Södertälje SK - Hammarby IF 2:1 (5:8, 3:1, 4:2)
- Luleå HF - Kiruna AIF 2:1 (5:1, 2:3, 4:2)

=== South/West ===
==== First round ====
- Mora IK - Nybro IF 2:0 (2:1, 8:1)
- Bofors IK - IF Troja 2:1 (6:4, 2:7, 11:2)
- IFK Bäcken - IK Rommehed 0:2 (4:5, 4:5 OT)
- Karlskrona IK - Strömsbro IF 2:1 (9:4, 3:9, 6:4)

==== Second round ====
- Mora IK - Karlskrona IK 2:1 (4:1, 0:7, 6:0)
- Bofors IK - IK Rommehed 2:1 (3:4, 4:3, 4:3)
