= 1929 Swedish Ice Hockey Championship =

The 1929 Swedish Ice Hockey Championship was the eighth season of the Swedish Ice Hockey Championship, the national championship of Sweden. IK Gota won the championship.

== Tournament ==
=== Qualification round ===
- Nacka SK - IFK Stockholm 5:4
- Lidingö IF - IF Mode 3:1
- UoIF Matteuspojkarna - IF Linnéa 2:1

=== Quarterfinals ===
- IK Göta - Djurgårdens IF 0:0/1:0
- Nacka SK - Lidingö IF 4:3
- Södertälje SK - Karlbergs BK 3:1
- Hammarby IF - UoIF Matteuspojkarna 7:1

=== Semifinals ===
- IK Göta - Nacka SK 4:1
- Södertälje SK - Hammarby IF 5:0

=== Final ===
- IK Göta - Södertälje SK 2:1
