= 1975–76 Division 1 season (Swedish ice hockey) =

- League: Division 1
- Sport: Ice hockey
- Number of teams: 49
- Promoted to Division 1: IF Björklöven; Örebro IK to Elitserien
- Relegated to Division 2: Borås HC; Enköpings SK HK; Gislaveds SK; Kramfors-Alliansen; Ludvika HC; Mälarhöjden/Västertorps BIK; Medle SK; Tierps IF

Division 1 seasons
- ← 1974–75 1976–77 →

1975–76 was the first season that Division 1 operated as the second tier of ice hockey in Sweden, this due to the creation of Elitserien (now the SHL) as a new flight of the Swedish hockey system.

Division 1 was divided into four starting groups, based on geography. The top four teams in the group would continue to the playoffs to determine which clubs would participate in the qualifier for promotion to Elitserien. The bottom two teams in each group were relegated to Division 2 for the 1976–77 season.

== Regular season ==
=== Division 1 Norra ("North") ===
*Continued to playoffs
*Relegated to 1976–77 Division 2

#	Team	GP	W	T	L	TP	GF	GA	GD
1	IF Björklöven	24	19	1	4	39	186	82	+104
2	Kiruna AIF	24	19	1	4	39	186	82	+104
3	Bodens BK	24	15	1	8	31	86	31	+66
4	IFK Luleå	24	15	1	8	31	133	99	+34
5	IFK Kiruna	24	15	0	9	30	141	99	+42
6	Piteå IF	24	13	3	8	29	151	127	+24
7	Tegs SK	24	12	1	11	25	112	116	–4
8	Heffners/Ortvikens IF	24	10	0	14	20	105	99	+6
9	Tunadals IF	24	8	3	13	19	91	118	–27
10	Östersunds IK	24	7	2	15	16	93	132	–39
11	Järveds IF	24	5	2	17	12	88	145	–57
12	Medle SK	24	6	0	18	12	75	153	–78
13	Kramfors-Alliansen	24	4	1	19	9	64	200	–136

=== Division 1 Östra ("East") ===
*Continued to playoffs
*Relegated to 1976–77 Division 2

#	Team	GP	W	T	L	TP	GF	GA	GD
1	Örebro IK	22	19	0	3	38	188	65	+123
2	Huddinge IK	22	14	4	4	32	119	65	+54
3	Västerås IK	22	14	3	5	31	108	56	+52
4	Nacka SK	22	13	3	6	29	107	77	+30
5	Hammarby IF	22	11	4	7	26	109	80	+29
6	BK Kenty	22	12	2	8	26	82	76	+6
7	Väsby IK	22	10	3	9	23	127	101	+26
8	IK Vita Hästen	22	9	2	11	20	81	121	–40
9	Surahammars IF	22	9	0	13	18	116	137	–21
10	Nynäshamns IF	22	4	2	16	10	60	139	–79
11	Enköpings SK HK	22	2	2	18	6	49	120	–71
12	Mälarhöjden/Västertorps BIK	22	1	3	18	5	65	174	–109

=== Division 1 Södra ("South") ===
*Continued to playoffs
*Relegated to 1976–77 Division 2

#	Team	GP	W	T	L	TP	GF	GA	GD
1	Tingsryds AIF	22	19	2	1	40	162	68	+94
2	BK Bäcken	22	16	3	3	35	139	71	+68
3	HV 71	22	16	1	5	33	110	67	+43
4	Malmö IF	22	10	4	8	24	111	109	+2
5	Halmstads HK	22	9	4	9	22	93	109	–16
6	Nybro IF	22	9	2	11	20	90	90	±0
7	Karlskrona IK	22	7	4	11	18	90	117	–27
8	IF Troja	22	6	5	11	17	82	119	–37
9	Tibro IK	22	6	4	12	16	86	103	–17
10	Boro/Landsbro IF	22	6	4	12	16	79	124	–45
11	Borås HC	22	6	2	14	14	62	95	–33
12	Gislaveds SK	22	4	1	17	9	84	116	–32

=== Division 1 Västra ("West") ===
*Continued to playoffs
*Relegated to 1976–77 Division 2

#	Team	GP	W	T	L	TP	GF	GA	GD
1	Mora IK	22	16	4	2	36	158	85	+73
2	KB Karlskoga	22	15	4	3	34	115	72	+43
3	Strömsbro IF	22	14	2	6	30	97	78	+19
4	Grums IK	22	11	3	8	25	110	97	+13
5	Hofors IK	22	11	0	11	22	92	77	+15
6	Fagersta AIK	22	8	5	9	21	105	111	–6
7	IF Tunabro	22	7	4	11	18	70	88	–18
8	Bollnäs IS	22	7	3	12	17	91	103	–12
9	Falu IF	22	7	3	12	17	89	115	–26
10	Malungs IF	22	7	3	12	17	77	108	–31
11	Tierps IF	22	7	1	14	15	84	128	–44
12	Ludvika HC	22	5	2	15	12	69	95	–26

== Playoffs ==
The 16 teams (top 4 in the standings from each regular season group) that qualified for the playoffs all played two playoff rounds, leaving four surviving teams that continued to the 1976 Elitserien qualifier.

The format for the playoffs was a two-leg home-and-home series. Matches could end in a draw. If each team won one match, the result was decided by a sudden-death overtime, not by total goals over the two matches.

Björklöven, Mora, Örebro and Nacka won in the second round to continue to the 1976 Elitserien qualifier.

=== Round 1 ===
IF Björklöven defeats Grums IK

- First leg: IF Björklöven 5–1 Grums IK (0–0, 1–1, 4–0, attendance: 2,132)
- Second leg: Grums IK 2–10 IF Björklöven (1–3, 1–3, 0–4, attendance: 775)

Strömsbro IF defeats Kiruna AIF

- First leg: Kiruna AIF 2–3 Strömsbro IF (1–1, 1–0, 0–2, attendance: 2,127)
- Second leg: Strömsbro IF 2–8 Kiruna AIF (0–3, 1–4, 1–1, attendance 1,549)
  Strömsbro IF wins in sudden-death overtime

Mora IK defeats IFK Luleå

- First leg: Mora IK 9–5 IFK Luleå (3–1, 2–2, 4–2, attendance 1,920)
- Second leg: IFK Luleå 2–6 Mora IK (1–3, 0–0, 1–3, attendance 2,881)

KB Karlskoga defeats Bodens BK

- First leg: KB Karlskoga 7–3 Bodens BK (1–2, 1–1, 5–0, attendance 2,695)
- Second leg: Bodens BK 6–5 KB Karlskoga (2–2, 3–1, 1–2, attendance 2,724)
  KB Karlskoga wins in sudden-death overtime

Örebro IK defeats Malmö IF

- First leg: Örebro IK 8–2 Malmö IF (2–1, 3–0, 3–1, attendance: 4,572)
- Second leg: Malmö IF 5–3 Örebro IK (1–1, 1–1, 3–1, attendance: 2,171)
  Örebro IK wins in sudden-death overtime

HV 71 defeats Huddinge IK

- First leg: Huddinge IK 6–5 HV 71 (1–1, 3–1, 2–3, attendance 1,247)
- Second leg: HV 71 14–4 Huddinge IK (5–1, 9–3, 0–0, attendance 4,800)
  HV 71 wins in sudden-death overtime

Nacka SK defeats Tingsryds AIF

- First leg: Tingsryds AIF 2–3 Nacka SK (1–2, 0–0, 1–1, attendance 1,802)
- Second leg: Nacka SK 1–1 Tingsryds AIF (0–1, 1–0, 0–0, attendance 852)

BK Bäcken defeats Västerås IK

- First leg: Västerås IK 0–2 BK Bäcken (0–1, 0–1, 0–0, attendance: 3,277)
- Second leg: BK Bäcken 7–2 Västerås IK (4–1, 1–0, 2–1, attendance 3,692)

=== Round 2 ===
IF Björklöven defeats KB Karlskoga

- First leg: IF Björklöven 5–3 KB Karlskoga (0–2, 4–0, 1–1, attendance: 2,282)
- Second leg: KB Karlskoga 4–4 IF Björklöven (1–2, 1–0, 2–2, attendance: 4,054)

Mora IK defeats Strömsbro IF

- First leg: Strömsbro IF 5–5 Mora IK (2–1, 1–1, 2–3, attendance: 1,669)
- Second leg: Mora IK 5-3 Strömsbro IF (1–1, 2–1, 2–1, attendance 2,096)

Örebro IK defeats BK Bäcken

- First leg: Örebro IK 2–4 BK Bäcken (1–1, 0–2, 1–1, attendance: 5,985)
- Second leg: BK Bäcken 2–4 Örebro IK (0–2, 2–2, 0–0, attendance: 4,225)

Örebro IK wins in sudden-death overtime Nacka SK defeats HV 71

- First leg: HV 71 1–2 Nacka SK (1–1, 0–0, 0–1, attendance: 4,800)
- Second leg: Nacka SK 3–2 HV 71 (1–0, 0–0, 2–2, attendance: 840)

== Elitserien qualifier ==
The four playoff winners played a double-round robin tournament, with the top two teams being promoted to Elitserien for the 1976–77 season, replacing the two teams with the poorest records from the 1975–76 Elitserien.

*Promoted to 1976–77 Elitserien
*Stays in Division 1 for 1976–77

#	Team	GP	W	T	L	TP	GF	GA	GD
1	IF Björklöven	6	4	1	1	9	33	21	+12
2	Örebro IK	6	4	0	2	8	41	29	+12
3	Mora IK	6	3	1	2	7	32	28	+4
4	Nacka SK	6	0	0	6	0	11	39	–28
