= 1960–61 Swedish Division I season =

Swedish ice hockey season

The 1960–61 Swedish Division I season was the 17th season of Swedish Division I. Djurgårdens IF won the league title by finishing first in the Swedish championship series.

== First round ==
=== Northern Group ===
	Team	GP	W	T	L	+/-	P
1	Skellefteå AIK	14	10	1	3	69–38	21
2	Leksands IF	14	9	1	4	50–34	19
3	Wifsta/Östrands IF	14	8	2	4	52–38	18
4	Gävle GIK	14	6	3	5	48–51	15
5	Strömsbro IF	14	7	1	6	58–73	15
6	AIK	14	5	2	7	45–51	12
7	Hammarby IF	14	3	2	9	50–71	8
8	Alfredshems IK	14	2	0	12	33–49	4

=== Southern Group ===
	Team	GP	W	T	L	+/-	P
1	Djurgårdens IF	14	14	0	0	106–26	28
2	Västerås IK	14	9	1	4	65–41	19
3	Södertälje SK	14	8	0	6	71–57	16
4	IFK Bofors	14	7	0	7	53–66	14
5	Brynäs IF	14	5	2	7	67–57	12
6	Forshaga IF	14	5	2	7	60–66	12
7	GAIS	14	3	0	11	46–116	6
8	Grums IK	14	2	1	11	41–80	5

== Swedish championship series ==
	Team	GP	W	T	L	+/-	P
1	Djurgårdens IF	6	4	2	0	31–15	10
2	Skellefteå AIK	6	3	0	3	21–27	6
3	Västerås IK	6	2	1	3	18–22	5
4	Leksands IF	6	1	1	4	20–26	3
