= 1953–54 Swedish Division I season =

Swedish ice hockey season

The 1953–54 Swedish Division I season was the tenth season of Swedish Division I. Djurgardens IF defeated Gavle GIK in the league final 1 game to none, 1 tie.

== Regular season ==
=== Northern Group ===
	Team	GP	W	T	L	+/-	P
1	Gävle GIK	10	9	1	0	45–19	19
2	Hammarby IF	10	6	1	3	53–29	13
3	Leksands IF	10	5	2	3	37–28	12
4	IK Göta	10	4	1	5	45–57	9
5	Mora IK	10	2	2	6	38–40	6
6	Atlas Diesels IF	10	1	0	9	17–62	2

=== Southern Group ===
	Team	GP	W	T	L	+/-	P
1	Djurgårdens IF	10	9	0	1	61–21	18
2	Södertälje SK	10	7	1	2	56–23	15
3	IFK Bofors	10	5	0	5	44–30	10
4	Grums IK	10	5	0	5	38–49	10
5	Surahammars IF	10	3	1	6	38–35	7
6	Åkers IF	10	0	0	10	18–97	0

== Final ==
- Djurgårdens IF – Gävle GIK 5–1, 1–1
