= 1956–57 Swedish Division I season =

Swedish ice hockey season

The 1956–57 Swedish Division I season was the 13th season of Swedish Division I. Gävle GIK won the league title by finishing first in the final round.

== First round ==
=== Northern Group ===
	Team	GP	W	T	L	+/-	P
1	Leksands IF	14	12	0	2	62–39	24
2	Gävle GIK	14	9	1	4	83–45	19
3	Skellefteå AIK	14	7	3	4	48–41	17
4	Wifsta/Östrands IF	14	6	1	7	53–58	13
5	IK Göta	14	5	1	8	55–70	11
6	Mora IK	14	5	1	8	57–81	11
7	Hammarby IF	14	4	1	9	52–66	9
8	Brynäs IF	14	4	0	10	41–61	8

=== Southern Group ===
	Team	GP	W	T	L	+/-	P
1	Djurgårdens IF	14	12	1	1	122–30	25
2	Södertälje SK	14	10	1	3	66–39	21
3	Grums IK	14	8	2	4	74–51	18
4	IFK Bofors	14	7	1	6	59–56	15
5	Forshaga IF	14	7	0	7	54–76	14
6	Västerås IK	14	4	1	9	46–61	9
7	UoIF Matteuspojkarna	14	3	2	9	37–84	8
8	BK Star	14	0	2	12	36–97	2

== Final round ==
	Team	GP	W	T	L	+/-	P
1	Gävle GIK	6	4	0	2	24–15	8
2	Djurgårdens IF	6	3	1	2	21–16	7
3	Södertälje SK	6	3	1	2	20–19	7
4	Leksands IF	6	1	0	5	13–28	2
