= Ragnar Johansson =

Swedish ice hockey player

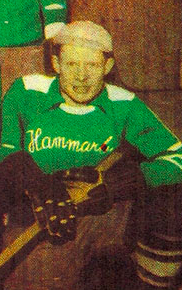
- Johansson with Hammarby IF in 1944.
- Born: Ragnar Leonard Johansson; 30 December 1911; Stockholm, Sweden
- Died: 3 December 2002 (aged 90); Bollnäs, Sweden
Ice hockey career
- Position: Forward
- Shot: Left
- Played for: Hammarby IF; Atlas Diesels IF
- National team: Sweden
- Playing career: 1934–1947
Bandy career
- Playing position: Midfielder
Senior career*
Years	Team	Apps^{†}	(Gls)^{†}
1934–1944	Hammarby IF		
- * Senior club appearances and goals counted for the domestic league only. † Appearances (Goals).
Association football career
- Position(s): Forward
Senior career*
Years	Team	Apps	(Gls)
1934–1938	Hammarby IF	17	(2)
- *Club domestic league appearances and goals

Ragnar "Ragge" Johansson (30 December 1911 – 3 December 2002) was a Swedish ice hockey player and coach, best known for representing Hammarby IF and winning four domestic titles with the club. He competed in the 1938 World Championships. Johansson also played bandy and football.

== Athletic career ==
=== Ice hockey ===
Born and raised in Stockholm, Johansson started to play ice hockey with local club IK Nordia as a youngster. In 1934, at age 22, Johansson made his debut in the senior roster of Hammarby IF, competing in the top tier Elitserien.

Johansson won four Swedish championships – in 1936, 1937, 1942 and 1943 – with Hammarby IF. In total, he played 185 games for the club and scored 47 goals.

He made 16 international appearances for the Sweden national team. Johansson competed in the 1938 World Championships, where Sweden finished in 5th place.

He briefly represented Atlas Diesels IF in 1945–1946, before retiring at Hammarby IF in 1947.

=== Bandy ===
Like many other ice hockey players at the time, Pettersson also played bandy with Hammarby IF. He played two seasons in the top tier Allsvenskan, in 1935 and 1944.

=== Football ===
Johansson also briefly played football with Hammarby IF in Division 2, Sweden's second tier, between 1934 and 1938.

== Coaching career ==
After his playing career ended, Johansson worked as an ice hockey coach. He was the manager of Hammarby IF between 1946 and 1954, most notably winning the Swedish Championship in 1951. He also coached Forshaga IF, IK Göta, Strömsbro IF and the Norway national team, as well as working for the Swedish Ice Hockey Association.
