= Erik Larsson (ice hockey) =

Swedish ice hockey player

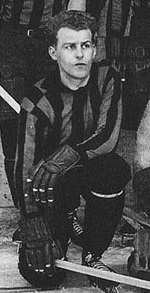
- Larsson with Hammarby IF's hockey team in 1932.
- Born: Erik Waldemar Larsson; 18 January 1905; Stockholm, Sweden
- Died: 8 March 1970 (aged 65); Stockholm, Sweden
Ice hockey career
- Position: Forward
- Played for: Hammarby IF
- National team: Sweden
- Playing career: 1924–1935
Medal record
Representing Sweden
Men's Ice Hockey
Olympic Games
Silver medal – second place	1928 St. Moritz	Team
Association football career
- Position: Midfielder
Senior career*
Years	Team	Apps	(Gls)
1924–1933	Hammarby IF	79	(8)
- * Club domestic league appearances and goals
Bandy career
- Playing position: Forward
Senior career*
Years	Team	Apps^{†}	(Gls)^{†}
1923–1938	Hammarby IF		
- * Senior club appearances and goals counted for the domestic league only. † Appearances (Goals).

Erik Waldemar "Burret" Larsson (18 January 1905 – 8 March 1970) was a Swedish ice hockey, football and bandy player, best known for representing Hammarby IF in all three sports. He won the silver medal with Sweden's ice hockey team in the 1928 Winter Olympics.

== Athletic career ==
=== Ice hockey ===
In 1924, at age 17, Larsson made his debut for Hammarby IF in the Klass I, Sweden's top division. He would go on to form a feared forward line with Helge Johansson and Sigfrid Öberg in the upcoming years. In 1928, Larsson competed in the Winter Olympics in St. Moritz with Sweden, and won the silver medal. In total, Larsson played 11 international games for his country. He is a recipient of the honorary award Stora Grabbars Märke, handed out by the Swedish Ice Hockey Association. He won two Swedish championships – in 1932 and 1933 – with Hammarby IF, the club's first domestic titles. After 13 seasons with the club, Larsson retired from ice hockey in 1936. He returned to Hammarby IF a few years later, working as the head coach for two seasons between 1938 and 1940.

=== Football ===
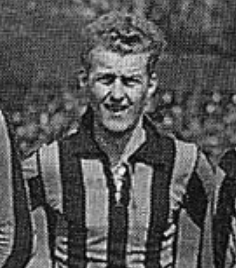
Larsson with Hammarby IF's football team in 1930.

In 1924–25, Larsson made his debut for Hammarby IF in Allsvenskan, the inaugural season of Sweden's new first-tier football league. He played 11 games as a midfielder, scoring two goals, but was unable to save the club from a relegation. He continued to play football with the club in Division 2, the second tier, until 1933 and made 79 league appearances in total.

=== Bandy ===
Larsson also played bandy with Hammarby IF. In the 1920s, Hammarby pushed for a Swedish Championship title, which by then was decided by a cup, but got knocked out in the later stages of the play-offs. In 1931, Larsson competed in the inaugural season of Allsvenskan, a national league.
