= Sture Gillström =

Swedish football, ice hockey and bandy player

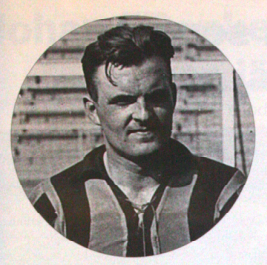
- Sture Gillström in the Hammarby shirt, cerca 1930.
- Born: Axel Sture Alexander Gillström; 3 December 1908; Stockholm, Sweden
- Died: 28 January 1978 (aged 69); Stockholm, Sweden
- Height: 175 cm (5 ft 9 in)
Association football career
- Positions: Left winger; forward
Youth career
- 1922–1925: Hammarby IF
Senior career*
Years	Team	Apps	(Gls)
1925–1933	Hammarby IF	118	(51)
1933–1934	AIK	5	(3)
1934–1936	Hammarby IF	41	(21)
- * Club domestic league appearances and goals
Ice hockey career
- Position: Defenceman / Forward
- Played for: Hammarby IF; AIK
- Playing career: 1926–1934
Bandy career
- Playing position: Forward
Senior career*
Years	Team	Apps^{†}	(Gls)^{†}
1927–1933	Hammarby		
- * Senior club appearances and goals counted for the domestic league only. † Appearances (Goals).

Sture "Stöttan" Gillström (3 December 1908 – 28 January 1978) was a Swedish football, ice hockey and bandy player, known for representing Hammarby IF in all three sports.

== Early life ==
Sture Gillström grew up in a working-class home in a southern part of Stockholm known as Södermalm. He and his two siblings were raised by the mother, since the father died in the 1918 Spanish flu pandemic.

== Athletic career ==
=== Football ===
He started to play football with the local club Hammarby IF as a youngster. On 2 August 1925, at the age of 16, Gillström debuted in the senior team, in the first fixture of the Division 2 campaign, and scored two goals as Hammarby won 3–2 against Sundbybergs IK.

Gillström established himself as an important offensive player in Hammarby, competing in the Swedish second tier, and was the club's top scorer during four seasons. In total, Gillström made 159 league appearances for Hammarby, scoring 72 goals, between 1925 and 1936.

He enjoyed a brief stint at the Allsvenskan club AIK, during the season of 1933–34. Back in Hammarby for the 1934–35 season, Gillström scored a hattrick on 5 May 1935 against Västerviks AIS and become the team's top scorer for the season with eight goals.

After definitely leaving Hammarby in 1936, Gillström finished his playing career with Sundbyberg in the Swedish lower divisions.

=== Ice hockey ===
Gillström also played ice hockey and won two Swedish championships, in 1932 and 1933, with Hammarby, the club's first domestic titles.

=== Bandy ===
Gillström also showed promise as a bandy player, winning the Stockholm junior district championship in 1926 with Hammarby. As a player in the men's senior team, Gillström helped establish Hammarby among the top bandy clubs in Sweden at the end of the 1920s and the beginning of the 1930s.

== Personal life ==
Besides being a sportsman, Gillström worked as a mechanical engineer for ASEA in both Stockholm and Västerås.
