= 1940–41 Svenska Serien season =

Swedish ice hockey league season

The 1940–41 Svenska Serien season was the sixth season of the Svenska Serien, the top level ice hockey league in Sweden. Hammarby IF won their third straight league title.

== Regular season ==
In a change of format from previous seasons, the 8 teams all played each other once, after which they split into an upper group and a lower group based on their performance in the first 7 matches. They then played an additional match against each of the other three teams in their half, resulting in a 10-game season.

	Team	GP	W	T	L	+/-	P
Upper half
1	Hammarby IF	10	8	2	0	44 - 10	18
2	IK Göta	10	5	3	2	19 - 17	13
3	Södertälje SK	10	5	2	3	25 - 13	12
4	AIK	10	4	2	4	25 - 16	10
Lower half
5	Karlbergs BK	10	5	2	3	27 - 15	12
6	IK Hermes	10	4	1	5	17 - 40	9
7	IFK Mariefred	10	1	1	8	18 - 40	3
8	IK Sture	10	1	1	8	9 - 53	3
