= 1923 Swedish Ice Hockey Championship =

== Tournament ==
Qualifying round 27 February 1923
Djurgårdens IF	2
Hammarby IF	0

Semifinals; 1 March 1923
Djurgårdens IF	4
IFK Stockholm	0
IK Göta	4
Nacka SK	3

Finals; 4 March 1923
IK Göta	3
Djurgårdens IF	0
