= Bengt Liedstrand =

Swedish ice hockey player

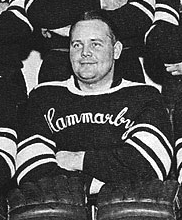
- Liedstrand with Hammarby IF in 1940.
- Born: 25 October 1911 Ekerö, Sweden
- Died: 25 March 2003 (aged 91) Trosa, Sweden
- Position: Goaltender
- Played for: Södertälje SK; Hammarby IF
- National team: Sweden
- Playing career: 1926–1943

Bengt Olof Liedstrand (25 October 1911 – 25 March 2003) was a Swedish ice hockey goaltender. He is best known for representing Hammarby IF, winning five domestic titles with the club, and competed in two World Championships.

== Career ==
=== Club teams ===
Liedstrand started to play ice hockey with Södertälje SK as a child. In 1926, he was promoted to their senior roster and went on to play three seasons with the club in Klass I and Elitserien, Sweden's highest leagues at the time. In total, Liedstrand made 12 appearances for the club, earning four shutouts.

In 1929, Liedstrand moved to fellow top flight team Hammarby IF in Stockholm. He won five Swedish championships – in 1932, 1933, 1937, 1942 and 1943 – with Hammarby IF. The club also won the domestic title in 1936, but Liedstrand was replaced in the net by John Wikland in the playoffs, thus not being awarded a gold medal. In total, Liedstrand played 200 games for the club in 14 seasons until his retirement in 1943.

=== International career ===
He made 11 international appearances for the Swedish national team. Liedstrand competed in the 1935 and 1937 World Championships, as Sweden finished in 5th and 10th place, respectively.
