= Sigfrid Öberg =

Swedish ice hockey player

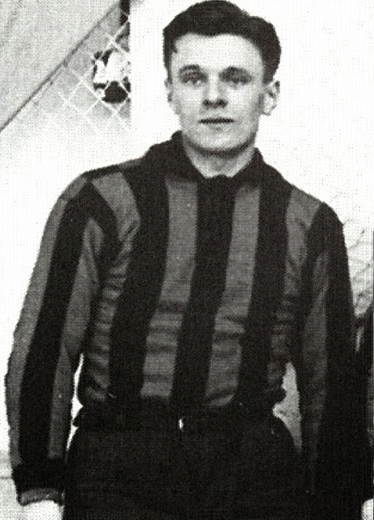
- Born: Sigfrid Emil Öberg; 22 February 1907; Stockholm, Sweden
- Died: 2 April 1949 (aged 42); Stockholm, Sweden
Ice hockey career
- Position: Right wing
- Shot: Right
- Played for: Hammarby IF
- National team: Sweden
- Playing career: 1926–1939
Medal record
Representing Sweden
Olympic Games
Silver medal – second place	1928 St. Moritz	Team
Association football career
- Position: Forward
Youth career
- Hammarby IF
Senior career*
Years	Team	Apps	(Gls)
1925–1935	Hammarby IF	124	(54)
- * Club domestic league appearances and goals
Bandy career
- Playing position: Forward
Senior career*
Years	Team	Apps^{†}	(Gls)^{†}
1925–1939	Hammarby IF		
National team
1929–1933	Sweden	3	(0)
- * Senior club appearances and goals counted for the domestic league only. † Appearances (Goals).

Sigfrid "Sigge" Öberg (22 February 1907 – 2 April 1949) was a Swedish ice hockey, football and bandy player, known for representing Hammarby IF in all three sports.

He won a silver medal with the Swedish national hockey team at the 1928 Winter Olympics and four domestic league titles with Hammarby.

== Athletic career ==
=== Ice hockey ===
In 1926, at age 18, Öberg made his debut for Hammarby IF in Elitserien, Sweden's top tier. He would go on to form a feared forward line with Helge Johansson and Erik Larsson in the upcoming years.

Öberg won four Swedish championships – in 1932, 1933, 1936 and 1937 – with the club, their first domestic titles.

He was known as a physical right winger and a particularly skilled skater, who possessed a great shooting ability and stickhandling.

Öberg won 25 competitive caps for the Swedish national team, scoring a total of 6 goals, and represented his country at several major tournaments; the biggest achievement was winning the silver medal in the 1928 Winter Olympics. Öberg is a recipient of the honorary award Stora Grabbars Märke and was inducted into the Swedish Hockey Hall of Fame in 2012; both awards are handed out by the Swedish Ice Hockey Association.

He retired from ice hockey in 1939.

=== Football ===
Öberg also played football with Hammarby IF and made his debut for the senior team in 1926, at age 18.

Up until his retirement from the sport in 1935, Öberg made 124 league appearances for Hammarby in the Swedish second tier Division 2, scoring 54 goals playing as a forward.

=== Bandy ===
Öberg was also a prominent bandy player for Hammarby IF between 1925 and 1939. He was a member of the Swedish national team and won a total of five caps for his country. As well as in ice hockey, Öberg was a recipient of the honorary award Stora Grabbars Märke in bandy, an award that is handed out by the Swedish Bandy Association.

== Personal life ==
He grew up in a working-class home in a southern part of Stockholm known as Södermalm, where he lived his whole life. On 2 April 1949, Öberg died by drowning in the waterway Hammarbyleden, at the age of 42.
