= Bror Pettersson =

Swedish ice hockey player

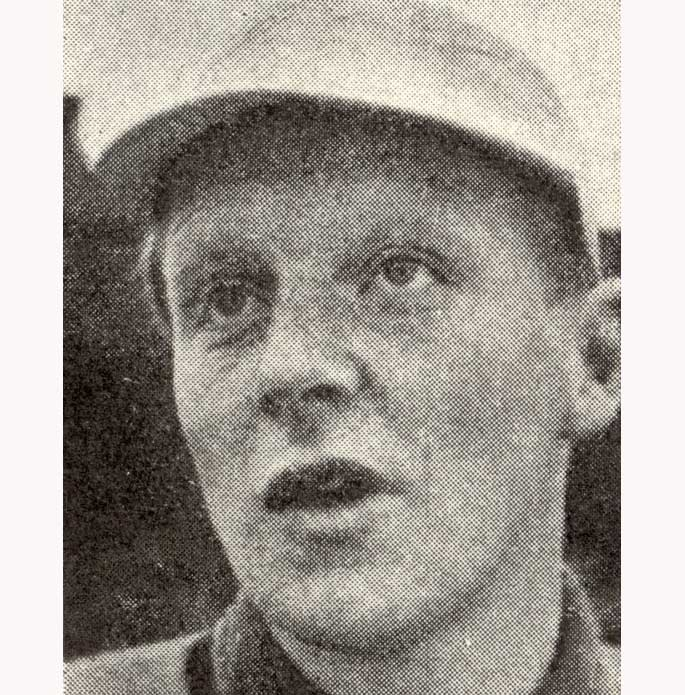
- Born: Bror Gunnar Pettersson; 31 January 1924; Stockholm, Sweden
- Died: 15 October 1978 (aged 54); Stockholm, Sweden
Ice hockey career
- Position: Right wing
- Played for: Hammarby IF
- National team: Sweden
- Playing career: 1941–1956
Medal record
Representing Sweden
World Championships
Silver medal – second place	Prague 1947	Team
Bandy career
- Playing position: Defender
Senior career*
Years	Team	Apps^{†}	(Gls)^{†}
1943–1947 1952–1954	Hammarby IF		
- * Senior club appearances and goals counted for the domestic league only. † Appearances (Goals).
Association football career
- Position: Forward
Senior career*
Years	Team	Apps	(Gls)
- IK Tellus
1946–1947	Hammarby IF	8	(0)
- * Club domestic league appearances and goals

Bror "Lulle" Pettersson (31 January 1924 – 15 October 1978) was a Swedish ice hockey and bandy player, who represented Hammarby IF in both sports. He won the silver medal with Sweden in the 1947 World Championships.

== Athletic career ==
=== Ice hockey ===
Born and raised in Stockholm, Pettersson started to play ice hockey with Hammarby IF at age 12. In 1941, he made his debut in their senior roster, competing in the top flight Svenska Serien.

Pettersson won three Swedish championships – in 1942, 1945 and 1951 – with Hammarby IF. In total, he played 183 games for the club and scored 75 goals, in 14 seasons until 1956.

He made 23 international appearances for the Sweden national team. He won a silver medal with Sweden in the 1947 World Championships and finished in fourth place at the 1948 Winter Olympics in St. Moritz.

=== Bandy ===
Like many other ice hockey players at the time, Pettersson also played bandy. He made his debut for Hammarby IF in 1943, playing two seasons for the side in Allsvenskan, before leaving at the end of 1947. He made a comeback in 1952, playing an other two seasons in the first tier, before definitely retiring in 1954.

=== Football ===
Pettersson also briefly played football, starting his career with local club IK Tellus. In 1946–47, he made eight appearances for Hammarby IF, making three appearances in Division 2, Sweden's second tier.
