= Klass I =

- Sport: Ice hockey
- Founded: 1923
- Folded: 1927
- No. of teams: 6-9
- Country: Sweden
- Most titles: IK Göta (3)

The Klass I was the top level ice hockey league in Sweden from 1923 to 1927. It existed alongside the Swedish Ice Hockey Championship, where the national champion was crowned. Klass I existed along with the second-tier league Klass II. Klass I was replaced by the Elitserien as the top-level league in the 1927–28 season. Klass I continued to operate as the second-tier league, however, through the 1943–44 season.

== Champions ==
Season	Winners
1923	IK Göta
1924	Djurgårdens IF
1925	IK Göta
1926	Södertälje SK
1927	IK Göta
