= Måsnaren =

Lake in Sweden

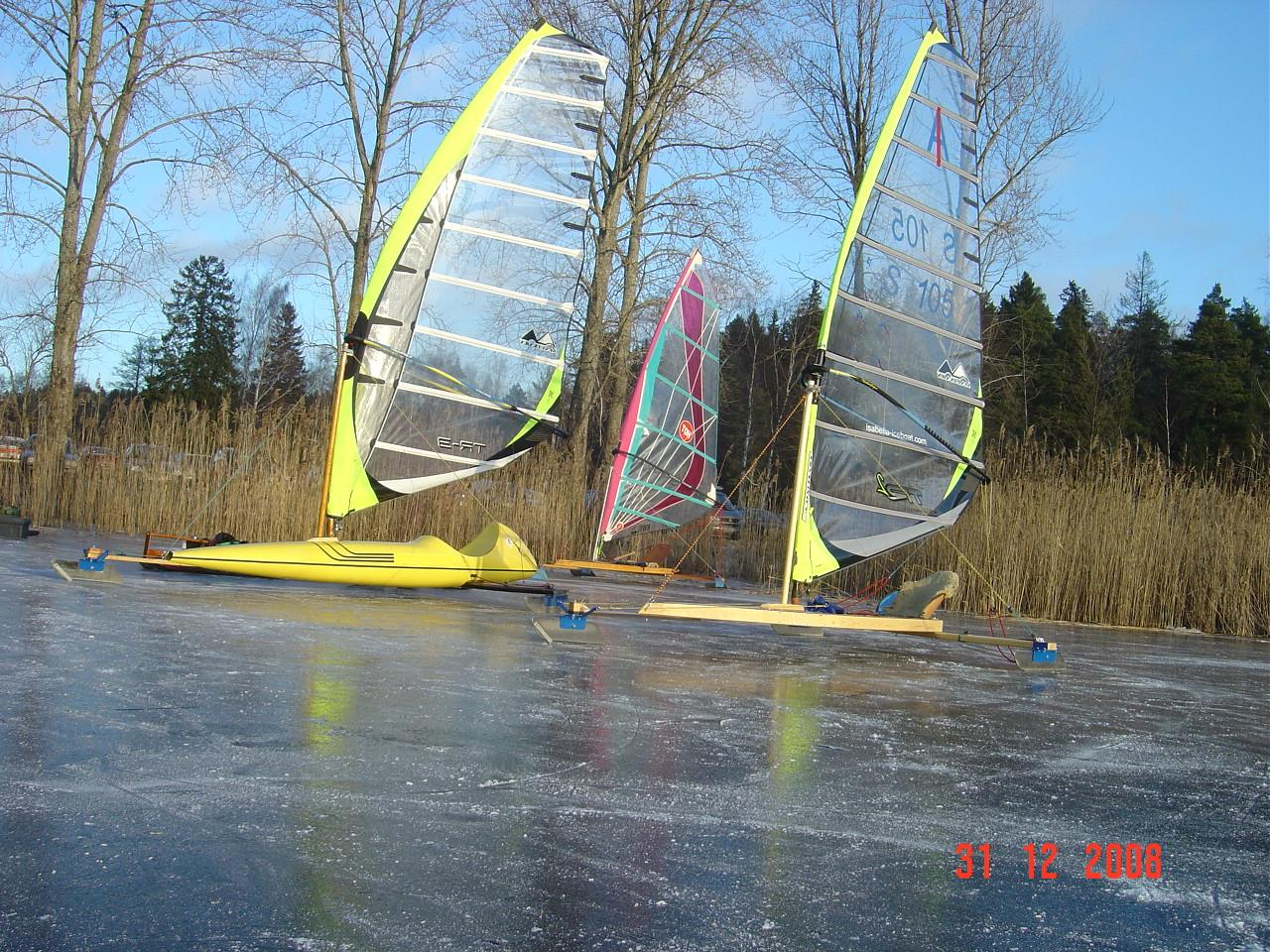

- Location within Stockholm
- Coordinates: 59°11′N 17°34′E
- Basin countries: Sweden

Måsnaren is a lake in Stockholm County, Södermanland, Sweden.
