= Hans Hjelm =

Swedish ice hockey player

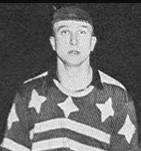
- Hjelm with Hammarby IF in 1951.
- Born: Hans Oskar Lorentz Hjelm; 16 December 1926; Stockholm, Sweden
- Died: 17 August 2006 (aged 79); Stockholm, Sweden
Ice hockey career
- Position: Left wing
- Played for: Hammarby IF; Atlas Diesels IF; Saltsjöbadens IF
- National team: Sweden
- Playing career: 1943–1956
Bandy career
- Playing position: Forward
Senior career*
Years	Team	Apps^{†}	(Gls)^{†}
1945–1951	Hammarby IF		
- * Senior club appearances and goals counted for the domestic league only. † Appearances (Goals).

Hans Hjelm (16 December 1926 – 17 August 2006) was a Swedish ice hockey player, best known for representing Hammarby IF and winning two domestic titles with the club. He won the silver medal with Sweden in the 1947 World Championships. Hjelm also played bandy.

== Athletic career ==
=== Ice hockey ===
Born and raised in Stockholm, Hjelm started to play ice hockey with Hammarby IF as a youngster. In 1943, at age 17, he made his debut in the senior roster, competing in the top tier Division 1. Hjelm won his first Swedish championship with the club in 1945, scoring the title winning goal in overtime against Södertälje SK, winning 3–2 in the final.

Hjelm made seven international appearances for the Swedish national team. Hjelm won the silver medal with Sweden in the 1947 World Championships.

He played one season with Atlas Diesels IF in the second division in 1948–49, before returning to Hammarby IF. He won his second Swedish championship with the club in 1951, scoring one goal as the side once again beat Södertälje SK with 3–2 in the final.

At the end of his career, Hjelm also represented Saltsjöbadens IF in the second tier for one season, before retiring with Hammarby IF in 1956. In total, he played 185 games for the club and scored 47 goals.

=== Bandy ===
Like many other ice hockey players at the time, Hjelm also played bandy with Hammarby IF. He competed in the top tier Allsvenskan for one season in 1946.
