= 1928 Swedish Ice Hockey Championship =

The 1928 Swedish Ice Hockey Championship was the seventh season of the Swedish Ice Hockey Championship, the national championship of Sweden. IK Gota won the championship.

== Tournament ==
=== Qualification ===
- Djurgårdens IF - Karlbergs BK 5:0

=== Semifinals ===
- IK Göta - Djurgårdens IF 6:2
- Södertälje SK - Hammarby IF 6:2

=== Final ===
- IK Göta - Södertälje SK 4:3
