= 1927 Swedish Ice Hockey Championship =

The 1927 Swedish Ice Hockey Championship was the sixth season of the Swedish Ice Hockey Championship, the national championship of Sweden. IK Gota won the championship.

== Tournament ==
=== First round ===
- VIK Västerås HK - Karlbergs BK 2:3

=== Second round ===
- Djurgårdens IF - Karlbergs BK 6:3

=== Semifinals ===
- IK Göta - Hammarby IF 5:3
- Djurgårdens IF - Södertälje SK 5:4

=== Final ===
- IK Göta - Djurgårdens IF 4:3
