= Helge Johansson =

Swedish ice hockey player (1905–1937)

- Born: 27 December 1905 Väskinde, Sweden
- Died: 3 November 1937 (aged 31) Stockholm, Sweden
- Played for: BK Nordia; Hammarby Hockey; Djurgårdens IF
- National team: Sweden

Sven Helge "Dempsey" Johansson (27 December 1905 – 3 November 1937) was a Swedish ice hockey player who competed in the 1924 Winter Olympics.

In 1924, he was a member of the Swedish ice hockey team which finished fourth in the Olympic ice hockey tournament. Johansson played for BK Nordia, Hammarby Hockey and Djurgårdens IF. Johansson also played bandy and represented Hammarby IF.
