= Skoghalls IF =

Former sports club in Skoghall, Sweden

- Full name: Skoghalls idrottsförening
- Sport: soccer, bandy
- Founded: 1919
- Folded: 1963
- Based in: Skoghall, Sweden

Skoghalls IF was a sports club in Skoghall, Sweden, established in 1919. The club ran association football and bandy. The men's bandy team played in the Swedish top division in 1940., 1942, 1946 and 1947.

The men's soccer team played seven seasons in the Swedish third division.

In 1963, the club merged with Vidöns IK to form IFK Skoghall.
