= Hammarby Hockey (1921–2008) =

Former ice hockey club in Stockholm, Sweden

Hammarby IF Ishockeyförening
- City: Stockholm, Sweden
- League: HockeyAllsvenskan (at time of bankruptcy)
- Operated: 1921–2008
- Home arena: Hovet
- Colours: Green and white
- Parent club: Hammarby IF

Franchise history
- Swedish champions: 1932, 1933, 1936, 1937, 1942, 1943, 1945, 1951

Hammarby IF Ishockeyförening (or Hammarby Hockey) was a Stockholm-based professional ice hockey team that for most of its history played in Hovet. Hammarby IF started playing hockey in 1921, playing their first matches using a group of curious bandy players. Hammarby were giants in the early history of Swedish hockey, playing in Sweden's top league from the birth of Swedish organized hockey in 1922 until 1957. During that period, they were crowned Swedish champions eight times (1932, 1933, 1936, 1937, 1942, 1943, 1945, and 1951) in 13 attempts. The rest of their history was more modest, having qualified for play in Elitserien (Sweden's current top-tier league, now called the SHL) only twice, however during their entire existence, they never played in a lower league than the second tier. As of 2013, five seasons after the club's bankruptcy, Hammarby is 17th in the Marathon standings for the highest division of Swedish ice hockey.

In the 2000s, the club was experiencing severe financial difficulties, having racked up a debt of over 4 million SEK, and having difficulties affording the lease for their arena. By February 2008, the choice was to play in the third-tier league or file for bankruptcy, as the club was in a demotion spot in the standings and had announced that they were in no position to participate in the Kvalserien tournament to defend their spot in HockeyAllsvenskan. Hammarby Hockey declared bankruptcy on 22 April 2008, after 87 years of hockey under the name of "Hammarby IF".

That same year, supporters of Hammarby Hockey started a new ice hockey club named Bajen Fans IF, which would rebuild from Division 4. After rapidly climbing through the Swedish hockey system, the new club has renamed itself Hammarby Hockey and joined the Hammarby IF umbrella organization.

== Notable players ==
List criteria:

- player has won at least three Swedish championships with Hammarby IF, or
- has received the honorary award Stora Grabbars Märke from the Swedish Ice Hockey Association playing the majority of their career at the club, or
- is a member of the IIHF Hall of Fame or Swedish Hockey Hall of Fame, starting or playing the majority of their career at the club, or
- has won at least one medal with their country in the Olympic Games or World Championships while playing for Hammarby IF.

Name	Nationality	Position	Hammarby IF Hockey career	Club titles	Individual honours	International medals
Erik Larsson	Sweden	Forward	1924–1936	2 Swedish Championships	Stora Grabbars Märke	1928 OG
Sigfrid Öberg	Sweden	Right wing	1926–1939	4 Swedish Championships	Swedish Hockey Hall of Fame; Stora Grabbars Märke	1928 OG
Bertil Lundell	Sweden	Defenceman	1929–1942	5 Swedish Championships	Stora Grabbars Märke	
Bengt Liedstrand	Sweden	Goaltender	1929–1943	5 Swedish Championships		
Stig Emanuel Andersson	Sweden	Right wing	1932–1946	6 Swedish Championships	Stora Grabbars Märke	
Sven Bergqvist	Sweden	Defenceman	1932–1935; 1936–1946	5 Swedish Championships	IIHF Hall of Fame; Swedish Hockey Hall of Fame; Stora Grabbars Märke	
Ragnar Johansson	Sweden	Forward	1934–1945; 1946–1947	4 Swedish Championships		
Åke Andersson	Sweden	Defenceman	1934–1958	6 Swedish Championships	Swedish Hockey Hall of Fame; Stora Grabbars Märke	1947 WC; 1951 WC; 1952 OG; 1953 WC; 1954 WC
Holger Nurmela	Sweden	Left wing	1937–1950; 1955–1956	3 Swedish Championships	Swedish Hockey Hall of Fame; Stora Grabbars Märke	1947 WC; 1952 OG; 1954 WC
Gunnar Landelius	Sweden	Defenceman	1938–1950	3 Swedish Championships		1947 WC
Kurt Kjellström	Sweden	Centre	1938–1939; 1940–1946; 1950–1951	3 Swedish Championships	Swedish Hockey Hall of Fame	
Bror Pettersson	Sweden	Right wing	1941–1956	3 Swedish Championships		1947 WC
Hans Hjelm	Sweden	Left wing	1943–1948; 1949–1953; 1955–1956	2 Swedish Championships		1947 WC
Rune Johansson	Sweden	Defenceman	1945–1955	1 Swedish Championship	Stora Grabbars Märke	1947 WC; 1951 WC; 1952 OG; 1953 WC
Rolf Pettersson	Sweden	Forward	1946–1961	1 Swedish Championship	Stora Grabbars Märke	1947 WC; 1953 WC; 1954 WC
Pelle Lindbergh	Sweden	Goaltender	1976–1979		Swedish Hockey Hall of Fame; Vezina Trophy	1978 WJC; 1979 WC; 1980 OG

== Seasons ==
List of Hammarby seasons
Year	Level	League	Record		Highest. season atnd.	Notes	Ref.
Year	Level	League	Position	W–T–L W–OT–L	Highest. season atnd.	Notes	Ref.
1923	Tier 1	Klass I	3rd	3–0–2	500		
1923	1923 Swedish Championship		–	0–1		Eliminated in qualifier by Djurgårdens IF	
1924	Tier 1	Klass I	3rd	4–1–1			
1924	1924 Swedish Championship		–	0–1		Eliminated in 1st round by IK Göta	
1925	Tier 1	Klass I	NA	1–0–0		The tournament could not be completed.	
1925	1925 Swedish Championship		–	0–1		Eliminated in 2nd round by IK Göta	
1926	Tier 1	Klass I	3rd	4–3–0			
1926	1926 Swedish Championship		–	0–1		Eliminated in 2nd round by Södertälje SK	
1927	Tier 1	Klass I	3rd	4–1–2	800	Clinched spot in new Elitserien for following season.	
1927	1927 Swedish Championship		–	0–1		Eliminated in semifinals by IK Göta	
1927–28	Tier 1	Elitserien	3rd	2–0–4			
1927–28	1928 Swedish Championship		–	0–1		Eliminated in semifinals by Södertälje SK	
1928–29	Tier 1	Elitserien	5th	3–1–6	1,000		
1928–29	1929 Swedish Championship		–	1–1		Eliminated in semifinals by Södertälje SK	
1929–30	Tier 1	Elitserien	3rd	1–1–1		The tournament was not completed.	
1929–30	1930 Swedish Championship		–	0–1	2,000	Eliminated in 2nd round by IK Göta	
1930–31	Tier 1	Elitserien	2nd	3–1–2			
1930–31	1931 Swedish Championship		–	3–1	2,000	(silver) Lost 2–0 in finals to Södertälje SK	
1931–32	Tier 1	Elitserien	2nd	9–3–2	2,000		
1931–32	1932 Swedish Championship		–	4–0	1,500	Win in finals vs Södertälje SK (2–1); (gold) 1932 Swedish Champions (1st title)	
1932–33	Tier 1	Elitserien	1st	10–2–2	2,500		
1932–33	1933 Swedish Championship		–	3–0	1,800	Win in finals vs IK Göta (3–1); (gold) 1933 Swedish Champions (2nd title)	
1933–34	Tier 1	Elitserien	1st	11–0–3	1,500		
1933–34	1934 Swedish Championship		–	2–1	1,500	(silver) Lost 1–0 in finals to AIK	
1934–35	Tier 1	Elitserien	1st	10–2–2	1,300		
1934–35	1935 Swedish Championship		–	2–1	1,600	(silver) Lost 2–1 in finals to AIK	
1935–36	Tier 1	Svenska Serien	4th	3–1–3	2,600		
1935–36	1936 Swedish Championship		–	3–1–0	2,500	Wins in finals vs AIK (1–1, replay: 5–1); (gold) 1936 Swedish Champions (3rd title)	
1936–37	Tier 1	Svenska Serien	2nd	11–2–1	3,000		
1936–37	1937 Swedish Championship		–	3–0	1,700	Wins in finals vs Södertälje SK (1–0); (gold) 1937 Swedish Champions (4th title)	
1937–38	Tier 1	Svenska Serien	2nd	11–2–1	7,000		
1937–38	1938 Swedish Championship		–	2–1	1,500	(silver) Lost 2–0 in finals to AIK	
1938–39	Tier 1	Svenska Serien	1st	7–0–0	7,300	Shortened season played in autumn 1939 due to harsh weather. The 1939 Swedish Championship was canceled.	
1939–40	Tier 1	Svenska Serien	1st	10–3–1	3,500		
1939–40	1940 Swedish Championship		–	1–1	1,600	Eliminated in semifinals by IK Göta	
1940–41	Tier 1	Svenska Serien	1st	8–2–0	2,500		
1940–41	1941 Swedish Championship		–	1–1	2,400	Eliminated in semifinals by IK Göta	
1941–42	Tier 1	Svenska Serien	1st	12–1–1	3,900		
1941–42	1942 Swedish Championship		–	3–0	3,700	Win in finals vs Södertälje SK (3–0); (gold) 1942 Swedish Champions (5th title)	
1942–43	Tier 1	Svenska Serien	1st	10–1–2	5,800	The final matches were never played due to adverse weather, but Hammarby had already clinched 1st place.	
1942–43	1943 Swedish Championship		–	3–0	2,800	Win in finals vs IK Göta (4–1); (gold) 1943 Swedish Champions (6th title)	
1943–44	Tier 1	Svenska Serien	1st	10–3–1	3,400	Sixth straight 1st-place finish in Svenska serien	
1943–44	1944 Swedish Championship		–	2–1	7,300	(silver) Lost 3–2 in finals to Södertälje SK	
1944–45	Tier 1	Division 1 Södra	1st	9–1–0	4,800		
1944–45	Tier 1	Division 1 league finals	–	2–1	8,500	Won Division 1 title	
1944–45	1945 Swedish Championship		–	4–0	5,500	Win in finals vs Södertälje SK (3–2); (gold) 1945 Swedish Champions (7th title)	
1945–46	Tier 1	Division 1 Södra	1st	9–1–0	5,400		
1945–46	Tier 1	Division 1 league finals	–	2–1	8,000	Won Division 1 title	
1945–46	1946 Swedish Championship		–	1–1	2,000	Eliminated in semifinals by AIK	
1946–47	Tier 1	Division 1 Södra	1st	7–3–0	8,000		
1946–47	Tier 1	Division 1 league finals	–	2–0	5,400	Won Division 1 title.	
1946–47	1947 Swedish Championship		–	1–1-1	3,300	Eliminated in semifinals by IK Göta	
1947–48	Tier 1	Division 1 Södra	1st	7–2–1	8,600		
1947–48	Tier 1	Division 1 league finals	–	0–2	6,100		
1947–48	1948 Swedish Championship		–	0–1	3,200	Eliminated in quarterfinals by AIK	
1948–49	Tier 1	Division 1 Södra	1st	9–0–1	4,900		
1948–49	Tier 1	Division 1 league finals	–	2–0	4,500	Won Division 1 title 1949 Swedish Championship canceled.	
1949–50	Tier 1	Division 1 Södra	1st	7–2–1	4,400		
1949–50	Tier 1	Division 1 league finals	–	0–2	6,700		
1949–50	1950 Swedish Championship		–	1–1	3,800	Eliminated in semifinals by Djurgårdens IF	
1950–51	Tier 1	Division 1 Norra	2nd	6–1–3	3,500		
1950–51	1951 Swedish Championship		–	3–0	6,600	Win in finals vs Södertälje SK (3–2); (gold) 1951 Swedish Champions (8th and final title)	
1951–52	Tier 1	Division 1 Norra	2nd	7–1–2	5,100	Swedish Championships canceled.	
1952–53	Tier 1	Division 1 Norra	1st	10–0–0	2,900	Swedish Championship as separate tournament eliminated. Division 1 group winners now play finals for Swedish Championship title.	
1952–53	Tier 1	Swedish Championship finals	–	0–1–1	3,700	(silver) Lost finals to Södertälje SK (2–2, rematch 1–5)	
1953–54	Tier 1	Division 1 Norra	2nd	6–1–3	5,400		
1954–55	Tier 1	Division 1 Norra	1st	6–1–3	3,000		
1954–55	Tier 1	Swedish Championship finals	–	0–2	4,500	(silver) Lost finals to Djurgårdens IF	
1955–56	Tier 1	Division 1 Norra	2nd	5–2–3	5,300		
1955–56	Tier 1	SM-serien	4th	0–0–6	6,400		
1956–57	Tier 1	Division 1 Norra	7th	4–1–9	5,200	▼ Relegated to Division 2 First relegation in club's history, following 35 seasons in top tier.	
1957–58	Tier 2	Division 2 Östra B	1st	13–0–1	1,500		
1957–58	1958 Division 1 qualifier		1st	4-1-1	2,300	▲ Promoted to Division 1	
1958–59	Tier 1	Division 1 Norra	6th	4–2–8	5,500		
1959–60	Tier 1	Division 1 Norra	5th	5–0–9	4,100		
1960–61	Tier 1	Division 1 Norra	7th	3–2–9	5,800	▼ Relegated to Division 2	
1961–62	Tier 2	Division 2 Östra B	2nd	10–1–3	2,000		
1962–63	Tier 2	Division 2 Östra B	1st	18–0–0			
1962–63	1963 Division 1 qualifier		3rd	3-0-3			
1963–64	Tier 2	Division 2 Östra B	1st	17–0–1	2,500		
1963–64	1964 Division 1 qualifier		3rd	3-0-3	3,700		
1965 Division 1 qualifier		1st	5-0-1		▲ Promoted to Division 1		
1965–66	Tier 1	Division 1 Norra	8th	6–0–15	8,253	▼ Relegated to Division 2	
1966–67	Tier 2	Division 2 Västra A	2nd	18–2–2			
1967–68	Tier 2	Division 2 Östra B	1st	21–2–3			
1967–68	1968 Division 1 qualifier		2nd	4-0-2		▲ Promoted to Division 1	
1968–69	Tier 1	Division 1 Norra	8th	1–1–19		▼ Relegated to Division 2	
1969–70	Tier 2	Division 2 Östra B	4th	13–1–8			
1970–71	Tier 2	Division 2 Östra B	7th	7–1–10			
1971–72	Tier 2	Division 2 Östra B	3rd	8–7–3			
1972–73	Tier 2	Division 2 Östra B	1st	19–0–3			
1972–73	1973 Division 1 qualifier		5th	0-2-6			
1973–74	Tier 2	Division 2 Östra B	2nd	13–3–2			
1974–75	Tier 2	Division 2 Östra	1st	15–5–2	3,487		
1974–75	1975 Elitserien qualifier (North group)		2nd	3–0–3	9,719	League system reorganization. Elitserien created as top-tier league. Hammarby fails to qualify for new Elitserien. Plays in new 2nd-tier Division 1.	
1975–76	Tier 2	Division 1 Östra	5th	11–4–7			
1976–77	Tier 2	Division 1 Östra	3rd	20–3–10	7,214		
1976–77	Tier 2	Playoff to Elitserien qualifier	–	1–2		Eliminated in 1st round by HV 71 (1–2 in games)	
1977–78	Tier 2	Division 1 Östra	3rd	16–7–13			
1977–78	Tier 2	Playoff to Elitserien qualifier	–	3–3	6,261	1st round win vs HV 71 (2–1 in games); Eliminated in 2nd round by Örebro IK (1–2 in games)	
1978–79	Tier 2	Division 1 Östra	3rd	21–6–9			
1978–79	Tier 2	Playoff to Elitserien qualifier	–	0–2		Eliminated in 1st round by Timrå IK (0–2 in games)	
1979–80	Tier 2	Division 1 Östra	3rd	22–5–9	3,699		
1979–80	Tier 2	Playoff to Elitserien qualifier	-	3–3	9,821	1st round win vs Timrå IK (2–1 in games); Eliminated in 2nd round by Södertälje SK (1–2 in games)	
1980–81	Tier 2	Division 1 Östra	1st	26–5–5	3,206	Bye to 2nd round of playoffs	
1980–81	Tier 2	Playoff to Elitserien qualifier	–	4–1	8,071	2nd round win vs IF Troja (2–1 in games); 3rd round win vs Mora IK (2–0 in games)	
1980–81	1981 Elitserien qualifier		3rd	2–1–3	8,452		
1981–82	Tier 2	Division 1 Östra	2nd	22–7–7	6,039	Bye to 2nd round of playoffs	
1981–82	Tier 2	Playoff to Elitserien qualifier	–	4–0	4,291	2nd round win vs Piteå IF (2–0 in games); 3rd round win vs Bofors IK (2–0 in games)	
1981–82	1982 Elitserien qualifier		1st	4–0–2	9,525	▲ Promoted to Elitserien	
1982–83	Tier 1	Elitserien	10th	7–5–24	9,782	▼ Relegated to Division 1	
1983–84	Tier 2	Division 1 Östra	1st	14–2–2	4,049		
1983–84	Tier 2	Allsvenskan	2nd	7–2–5	4,754		
1983–84	Tier 2	Allsvenskan Finals	–	0–3	5,514	Lost Allsvenskan Finals to Luleå HF (0–3 in games)	
1983–84	1984 Elitserien qualifier		1st	4–1–1	9,867	▲ Promoted to Elitserien	
1984–85	Tier 1	Elitserien	10th	2–5–29	8,314	▼ Relegated to Division 1	
1985–86	Tier 2	Division 1 Västra	2nd	14–2–2	2,188		
1985–86	Tier 2	Allsvenskan	6th	5–4–5	3,865	Bye to 2nd round of playoffs	
1985–86	Tier 2	Playoff to Elitserien qualifier	–	4–1	1,901	2nd round win vs Rögle BK (2–1 in games); 3rd round win vs S/G Hockey 93 (2–0 in games)	
1985–86	1986 Elitserien qualifier		3rd	1–3–2	5,672		
1986–87	Tier 2	Division 1 Västra	2nd	13–1–4	5,512		
1986–87	Tier 2	Allsvenskan	6th	4–2–8	4,162		
1986–87	Tier 2	Playoff to Elitserien qualifier	–	3–2	3,036	1st round win vs Piteå HC (2–0 in matches); Eliminated in 2nd round by Väsby IK (1–2 in matches)	
1987–88	Tier 2	Division 1 Östra	3rd	10–2–6			
1987–88	Tier 2	Division 1 Östra continuation	2nd	8–1–5			
1987–88	Tier 2	Playoff to Elitserien qualifier	–	1–2		Eliminated in 1st round by Tyringe SoSS (1–2 in matches)	
1988–89	Tier 2	Division 1 Östra	1st	13–1–4	2,028		
1988–89	Tier 2	Allsvenskan	7th	8–0–10	2,713		Bye to 2nd round of playoffs
1988–89	Tier 2	Playoff to Elitserien qualifier	–	0–2	2,058		Eliminated in 2nd round by Väsby IK (0–2 in games)
1989–90	Tier 2	Division 1 Östra	3rd	13–1–4	2,275		
1989–90	Tier 2	Division 1 Östra continuation	1st	10–1–3	1,386		
1989–90	Tier 2	Playoff to Elitserien qualifier	–	2–3	2,593	1st round win vs Team Boro HC (2–1 in games); Eliminated in 2nd round by Rögle BK (0–2 in games)	
1990–91	Tier 2	Division 1 Östra	4th	8–4–6			
1990–91	Tier 2	Division 1 Östra continuation	3rd	7–3–4			
1991–92	Tier 2	Division 1 Östra	2nd	13–2–3	2,063		
1991–92	Tier 2	Allsvenskan	7th	7–0–11	5,225	Bye to 2nd round of playoffs	
1991–92	Tier 2	Playoff to Elitserien qualifier	–	0–2		Eliminated in 1st round by Team Boro HC (0–2 in games)	
1992–93	Tier 2	Division 1 Västra	4th	11–1–6	2,455		
1992–93	Tier 2	Division 1 Västra continuation	1st	13–1–0	1,502		
1992–93	Tier 2	Playoff to Elitserien qualifier	–	6–1	12,256	1st round win vs Mörrums GoIS IK (2–1 in matches); 2nd round win vs IF Troja/Ljungby (2–0 in matches); 3rd round win vs AIK (2–0 in matches)	
1992–93	1993 Elitserien qualifier		3rd	2–0–4			
1993–94	Tier 2	Division 1 Östra	4th	13–4–5	10,822		
1993–94	Tier 2	Division 1 Östra continuation	1st	13–3–2			
1993–94	Tier 2	Playoff to Elitserien qualifier	–	3–2		1st round win vs IF Sundsvall/Timrå Hockey (2–0 in matches); Eliminated in 2nd round by Mora IK (1–2 in matches)	
1994–95	Tier 2	Division 1 Östra	2nd	12–2–4	3,242		
1994–95	Tier 2	Allsvenskan	10th	3–3–12			
1995–96	Tier 2	Division 1 Östra	3rd	9–5–4	3,037		
1995–96	Tier 2	Division 1 Östra continuation	2nd	9–2–3			
1995–96	Tier 2	Playoff to Elitserien qualifier	–	1–2		Eliminated in 1st round by Timrå IK (1–2 in matches)	
1996–97	Tier 2	Division 1 Östra	1st	14–2–2			
1996–97	Tier 2	Allsvenskan	7th	4–2–8			
1997–98	Tier 2	Division 1 Östra	5th	8–2–8			
1997–98	Tier 2	Division 1 Östra continuation	5th	6–4–4			
1998–99	Tier 2	Division 1 Östra	5th	9–4–15			
1998–99	Tier 2	Division 1 Östra continuation	2nd	7–0–3		Qualify for 1999–2000 Allsvenskan	
1998–99	Tier 2	Playoff to Elitserien qualifier	–	3–2		1st round win vs Arlanda HC (2–0 in games); Eliminated in 2nd round by IF Sundsvall Hockey (1–2 in games)	
1999–00	Tier 2	Allsvenskan Norra	5th	16–6–10			
1999–00	Tier 2	Allsvenskan Norra continuation	1st	9–2–3			
1999–00	Tier 2	Playoff to Elitserien qualifier	–	0–2		Eliminated in 1st round by Mora IK (0–2 in matches)	
2000–01	Tier 2	Allsvenskan Norra	2nd	17–1–3–5			
2000–01	Tier 2	SuperAllsvenskan	3rd	6–2–1–5			
2000–01	Tier 2	Playoff to Elitserien qualifier	–	4–1		1st round win vs IK Oskarshamn (2–0 in matches); 2nd round win vs Mora IK (2–1 in matches)	
2000–01	2001 Elitserien qualifier		6th	1–1–8	3,529		
2001–02	Tier 2	Allsvenskan Norra	5th	16–1–3–12			
2001–02	Tier 2	Allsvenskan Norra continuation	1st	10–0–1–3			
2001–02	Tier 2	Playoff to Elitserien qualifier	–	0–2		Eliminated in 1st round by IF Björklöven (0–2 in matches)	
2002–03	Tier 2	Allsvenskan Norra	1st	21–2–1–4	4,112		
2002–03	Tier 2	SuperAllsvenskan	1st	8–2–1–3	4,628		
2002–03	2003 Elitserien qualifier		5th	2–0–2–6	5,337		
2003–04	Tier 2	Allsvenskan Norra	2nd	26–1–5	3,807		
2003–04	Tier 2	SuperAllsvenskan	2nd	8–3–3	6,057		
2003–04	2004 Elitserien qualifier		6th	2–2–6	5,023		
2004–05	Tier 2	Allsvenskan Södra	3rd	15–9–6			
2004–05	Tier 2	SuperAllsvenskan	7th	2–2–10	3,567		
2005–06	Tier 2	HockeyAllsvenskan	14th	9–8–25	3,103		
2005–06	2006 HockeyAllsvenskan qualifier		3rd	4–1–3	1,298		
2006–07	Tier 2	HockeyAllsvenskan	14th	9–9–27	3,260		
2007–08	Tier 2	HockeyAllsvenskan	16th	4–6–35	3,948	• Did not participate in HockeyAllsvenskan qualifier due to financial situation • Filed for bankruptcy in April 2008, and later dissolved. • For the current Hammarby ice hockey club, see Hammarby Hockey.	
For the current club's seasons, see Hammarby Hockey.

=== Notes ===
Preceded by Södertälje SK	Swedish ice hockey champions 1932, 1933	Succeeded by AIK
Preceded by AIK	Swedish ice hockey champions 1936, 1937	Succeeded by AIK
Preceded by Södertälje SK	Swedish ice hockey champions 1942, 1943	Succeeded by Södertälje SK
Preceded by Södertälje SK	Swedish ice hockey champions 1945	Succeeded by AIK
Preceded by Djurgårdens IF	Swedish ice hockey champions 1951	Succeeded by Södertälje SK
