= IK Sirius =

Sports club in Uppsala, Sweden

- Full name: Idrottsklubben Sirius
- Sports: bandy floorball football
- Founded: 9 August 1907; 117 years ago
- Based in: Uppsala, Sweden
- Colours: Black; Blue

Idrottsklubben Sirius, commonly known as IK Sirius or Sirius, is a Swedish sports club located in Uppsala. Today IK Sirius is active in bandy, floorball, and football as an alliance club.

== History ==
The sports club that became IK Sirius was founded on 9 August 1907 in the area of Svartbäcken in Uppsala, and got its current name on 5 April 1908 after having been discussing Svartbäckens IK and IK Spurt. At the time, several sports club existed in the city of Uppsala: IFK Uppsala, IF Thor, IF Heimdal, and Upsala IF. The sports club was founded for athletics, and took up cross-country skiing, bandy and football in 1908. During the first half of the 20th century, the sports club has also practised canoeing, swimming, handball, ice hockey, tennis, wrestling, boxing, and orienteering.

In 1980, the ice hockey department was dissolved. In 1991, the two remaining departments of football and bandy split and choose to act as an alliance club using the same name.

In 1999, the floorball club IBK JT 97 joined IK Sirius.

== Departments ==
| Sport | Started | Ended | Home venue | Notes | Ref. |
|---|---|---|---|---|---|
| athletics | 1907 | discontinued | | | |
| bandy IK Sirius Bandy | 1908 | | Studenternas IP | | |
| bowling | | discontinued | | | |
| boxing | | discontinued | | | |
| canoeing | 1917 | 1929 | | became KS Ägir | |
| cross-country skiing | 1908 | discontinued | | | |
| floorball IK Sirius Innebandy | 1999 | | IFU Arena | IBK JT 97 (a 1997 merge of Teknikums IBK and Johannesbäck IBS) joined IK Sirius in 1999; FBC Uppsala merged into IK Sirius in 2017 | |
| men's football IK Sirius Fotboll | 1908 | | Studenternas IP | | |
| women's football IK Sirius Fotboll (women) | | 2017 | | became IK Uppsala | |
| handball IK Sirius Handboll | 1936 | discontinued | | | |
| ice hockey IK Sirius Ishockey | 1937 | 1980 | | | |
| swimming | | discontinued | | | |
| orienteering | | discontinued | | | |
| tennis | | discontinued | | | |
| water polo | | discontinued | | | |
| wrestling | | discontinued | | | |
