= Skuru IK =

Swedish sports club

- Full name: Skuru idrottsklubb
- Sport: basketball, gymnastics, handball, swimming bowling, ice hockey (formerly)
- Founded: 22 October 1922
- Based in: Skuru, Sweden
- Arena: Nacka bollhall

Skuru IK is a sports club in Skuru in Nacka, Sweden, established on 22 October 1922. The club runs basketball, gymnastics, handball and swimming activity, previously even bowling and ice hockey. The club began to play handball in 1950 and the women's handball team won the Swedish national indoor championship titles in 2001, 2004 and 2005.

== Handball women's team European record ==
Season	Competition	Round	Club	1st leg	2nd leg	Aggregate
2016–17	EHF Cup	R1	(Czech Republic) DHC Slavia Prague	26–22	18–23	44–45
