= IF Linnéa =

Sports club in Stockholm, Sweden

- Full name: Idrottsföreningen Linnéa
- Sport: boxing, track and field athletics (currently) bandy, handball, ice hockey, ice skating, soccer, table tennis (earlier)
- Founded: 1908
- Based in: Stockholm

IF Linnéa was a sports club in Stockholm, which was subsequently split into two clubs, IF Linnéa Friidrott and IF Linnéa Boxning. IF Linnéa Friidrott was the section for athletics and IF Linnéa Boxning was the section for boxing.

IF Linnéa was founded in 1908. The name "Linnéa" was taken from a building by the Årsta forest, where the men who started the club used to play association football. The formal formation day was, however, on 13 May 1909, on the nameday of Linnéa.

IF Linnéa used to be a big club with many sports, among them bandy, ice hockey, athletics and boxing. The bandy team was the runner-up for the Swedish championship three times.

== Honours ==
=== Domestic ===
- Swedish Champions:
  - Runners-up (3): 1920, 1923, 1924
