= Åkers IF =

Swedish sports club

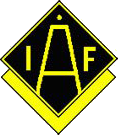
- Full name: Åkers Idrottsförening
- Sports: Current: Football; Gymnastics; Orienteering; Skiing; Former: Athletics; Bandy; Basketball; Cross country running; Floorball; Handball; Ice hockey
- Founded: 1918
- Based in: Åkers styckebruk, Sweden
- Website: www8.idrottonline.se/AkersIF/

Åkers IF, abbreviated ÅIF, is a Swedish sports club founded in 1918 and based in Åkers styckebruk. As of 2013, the club has sections competing in association football, gymnastics, orienteering, and skiing.

As of 2006, the club also ran sections for athletics, basketball, floorball, handball, and ice hockey. The club has also run sections for bandy and cross country running. The ice hockey section merged with Strängnäs HC in 2012 to become its own club, Åker/Strängnäs HC. That club currently plays in the modern Hockeyettan, the third tier of Swedish hockey, as of the 2013–14 season. Before the merger, the ice hockey section had played two seasons in Division I when it was the top tier of Swedish hockey (1946–47 and 1953–54).
