= IK Huge =

Swedish football club

- Full name: Idrottsklubben Huge
- Founded: 1927
- Ground: Kastvallen; Bomhus; Sweden
- Chairman: Matti Levonen
- Head coach: Jonas Molin, Johan Ericsson
- Coach: Janne Olsson
- League: Division 4 Gästrikland Gästrikland
- 2023: Division 4 Gästrikland,
Home colours	Away colours

IK Huge is a Swedish football club located in Gävle in Gävleborg County. The club has formerly also been playing bandy.

== Background ==
Idrottsklubben Huge is a sports club from the district of Bomhus in Gävle. The club was founded on 20 November 1927 through the merger of Kastets IF (formed 3 August 1920) and Bomhus IK (formed 10 July 1921). IK Huge is best known for achieving two national championships in bandy in 1939 and 1940. While the bandy section has been disbanded the club is still active in football and ice-hockey. In the latter the club spent three seasons in the highest ice hockey league in 1949/50, 1950/51 and 1952/53.

Since their foundation IK Huge has participated mainly in the middle and lower divisions of the Swedish football league system. The club currently plays in Division 3 Södra Norrland which is the fifth tier of Swedish football. They play their home matches at Kastvallen in Gävle.

IK Huge are affiliated to Gestriklands Fotbollförbund.

== Recent history ==
In recent seasons IK Huge have competed in the following divisions:

2011 – Division III, Södra Norrland
2010 – Division III, Södra Norrland
2009 – Division III, Södra Norrland
2008 – Division III, Södra Norrland
2007 – Division III, Södra Norrland
2006 – Division IV, Gästrikland
2005 – Division IV, Gästrikland
2004 – Division IV, Gästrikland
2003 – Division IV, Gästrikland
2002 – Division III, Södra Norrland
2001 – Division III, Södra Norrland
2000 – Division IV, Gästrikland
1999 – Division IV, Gästrikland

== Attendances ==
In recent seasons IK Huge have had the following average attendances:

Season	Average attendance	Division / Section	Level
2001	140	Div 3 Södra Norrland	Tier 4
2002	113	Div 3 Södra Norrland	Tier 4
2003	Not available	Div 4 Gästrikland	Tier 5
2004	Not available	Div 4 Gästrikland	Tier 5
2005	Not available	Div 4 Gästrikland	Tier 5
2006	Not available	Div 4 Gästrikland	Tier 6
2007	117	Div 3 Södra Norrland	Tier 5
2008	128	Div 3 Södra Norrland	Tier 5
2009	131	Div 3 Södra Norrland	Tier 5
2010	104	Div 3 Södra Norrland	Tier 5

* Attendances are provided in the Publikliga sections of the Svenska Fotbollförbundet website and European Football Statistics website.
