= Forshaga IF =

Forshaga IF Hockey
- City: Forshaga, Sweden
- League: Division 1
- Division: 1E
- Founded: 1907
- Home arena: Ängevi Ishall
- Colors: Blue, red, white
- Website: laget.se/FORSHAGAHOCKEY

Franchise history
- Seasons in top league: 12 (1946–47, 1948–49, 1949–50, 1950–51, 1951–52, 1952–53, 1956–57, 1957–58, 1958–59, 1959–60, 1960–61, 1961–62)

Championships
- Le Mat Trophy: 0

Forshaga Idrottsförening is a Swedish sports club, founded in 1907, and based in Forshaga, Värmland. The club plays both ice hockey and association football. The football club's A-team plays in Division 4 Värmland as of 2013 season. The ice hockey team historically has been more successful, having played 12 seasons in Division 1 when it was the top tier of Swedish ice hockey. IIHF Hall of Fame members Nils Nilsson and Ulf Sterner played for Forshaga. The hockey club's A-team currently plays in group E of Division 1, the third tier of ice hockey in Sweden (as of the 2013–14 season).
