= Strömsbro IF =

Swedish football club

- Full name: Strömsbro Idrottsförening
- Founded: 1921
- Ground: Testebovallens IP, Gävle
- Chairman: Lasse Löhman
- League: Division 4 Gestrikland
Home colours	Away colours

Strömsbro IF is a Swedish sports club located in Gävle.

== Background ==
Strömsbro IF currently plays football in Division 4 Gestrikland which is the sixth tier of Swedish football. They play their home matches at the Testebovallens IP in Gävle.

The club is affiliated to Gestriklands Fotbollförbund. Strömsbro IF have competed in the Svenska Cupen on 8 occasions and have played 8 matches in the competition.

The club is also active playing bandy, where the women 's team has been playing in the Swedish to-tier league.

== Season to season ==
In their most successful period Strömsbro IF competed in the following divisions:

Season	Level	Division	Section	Position	Movements
1979	Tier 4	Division 4	Gästrikland	4th	
1980	Tier 4	Division 4	Gästrikland	9th	
1981	Tier 4	Division 4	Gästrikland	7th	
1982	Tier 4	Division 4	Gästrikland	11th	Relegated

In recent seasons Strömsbro IF have competed in the following divisions:

Season	Level	Division	Section	Position	Movements
2006*	Tier 9	Division 7	Gästrikland	5th	
2007	Tier 8	Division 6	Gästrikland Grupp 1	6th	
2008	Tier 8	Division 6	Gästrikland Grupp 1	3rd	Promoted
2009	Tier 7	Division 5	Gästrikland	1st	Promoted
2010	Tier 6	Division 4	Gästrikland	10th	
2011	Tier 6	Division 4	Gästrikland	11th	Relegated

* League restructuring in 2006 resulted in a new division being created at Tier 3 and subsequent divisions dropping a level.
