= Gävle GIK =

Gävle Godtemplares IK
- City: Gävle, Sweden
- Founded: 6 May 1906; 120 years ago
- Home arena: Nynäshallen

Gävle Godtemplares Idrottsklubb, commonly known as Gävle GIK or GGIK, is a sports club from Gävle, Sweden. The club has an ice hockey department, most known for the success the team had during the 1950s, a floorball department, currently, as of 2022–23 playing in the Swedish men's top tier SSL, and a football department, currently only supporting youth teams.

== History ==
Gävle Godtemplares IK was founded 6 May 1906, as a gymnastics and athletics club. It was founded within the International Organisation of Good Templars. The origin in the temperance movement resulted in the nicknames Godis (lit. 'Sweets') and Saftpiraterna (lit. 'the Cordial Pirates').

Gävle GIK played their first ice hockey match in January 1940. It made its debut in Sweden's highest ice hockey division for the 1947–48 season. The team reached the finals in the 1953–54 season, but lost to Djurgårdens IF after a 5–1 loss and a 1–1 draw. Gävle GIK got their revenge in the 1956–57 season, when the team won the final series, and their first Le Mat trophy. By doing so, they became the first club from outside Stockholm metropolitan area to become national ice hockey champions.

The ice hockey team was relegated to the second division after the 1963–64 season, and has since not played in the highest division. The team currently plays in Division 2, which is the fourth tier in the Swedish league system.

Gävle GIK are or have been active in athletics, bandy, cycling, floorball, football, handball, orienteering, ski jumping, and tennis. In athletics, Bo Forssander won the club's first national title in athletics in 1971 when he won the 110 metres hurdles event. Forssander also won the 1972 title in the event.

Preceded by Södertälje SK	Swedish ice hockey champions 1957	Succeeded by Djurgårdens IF
