= Södertälje-Nykvarn Orientering =

Swedish orienteering club

Södertälje-Nykvarn orientering is a Swedish orienteering club in Södertälje. Its activities are based in Tveta by the lake Måsnaren, just west to the town.

== History ==
It started in 1999 by merging the orienteering activities of three sports clubs: IFK Södertälje, Södertälje IF och Oxvretens SK. In 2011 it became an independent association.

== IFK Södertälje ==
This club got a fourth place in Tiomila in 1966.

It won the Tiomila relay in 1986, 1992, 1993 and 1996.

It won the women's relay in Tiomila in 1989

== Södertälje IF ==
This club won Tiomila in 1961 and come second in 1966.

== Södertälje-Nykvarn orientering ==
As a merged club, it won the Tiomila relay in 2005 and in 2016. In 2005 Petr Losman managed to pass Tore Sandvik from Halden SK on the arena. In 2016 Andreu Blanes Reig got the lead on the fourth leg, which the kept until the ninth leg. Finally Jonas Leandersson managed to win with a margin of one meter.

Leandersson won three World Championships (sprint, relay and sprint relay) as well as the Swedish Championships in sprint in 2018.

Other runners in the club are Michael Wehlin, Panu Piiparinen, Ivar Lundanes, Jon-Are Myhren and Matthias Gilgien and Katarina Borg.
