= IFK Mariefred =

Swedish sports club

- Full name: Idrottsföreningen Kamraterna Mariefred
- Founded: June 17, 1908
- Ground: Mariefred, Sweden
- League: Division 7

IFK Mariefred is a sports club in Mariefred, Sweden. It consists of beach volleyball, football, athletics, handball, floorball, ice hockey, MMA, skiing, and dancing sections. The club was founded on June 17, 1908.

== History ==
The ice hockey department played in the Svenska Serien, then the highest-level Swedish league, in 1936–37, 1940–41, and 1942–43. From 1944 to 1947, they took part in its successor league, the Swedish Division I. In addition, the club also participated in the single-elimination Swedish Championship during the 1930s and 1940s.

The football department participates in Swedish Football Division 7, the ninth level in the Swedish football league system.
