= Tranebergs IF =

Swedish ice hockey team

Tranebergs IF was a professional ice hockey team based in Traneberg, Sweden. Founded in 1912, the team played in within the Swedish Divisions 1 and 2 until 1975. The team, whose colours were navy blue, red and white, was a steady competitor in Sweden's highest league from the 1920s to the 1950s, and was a semi-finalist in 1935.
