= UoIF Matteuspojkarna =

Swedish sports club

- Full name: Ungdoms- och idrottsföreningen Matteuspojkarna
- Nicknames: MP
- Sport: athletics, bowling, cross-country skiing, football, handball, ice hockey, orienteering
- Founded: 15 May 1915
- Based in: Stockholm, Sweden

Ungdoms-och Idrottsföreningen Matteuspojkarna, commonly known as Matteuspojkarna (lit. 'Matthews's Boys') or MP, is a sports club in Stockholm, Sweden.

== History ==
Matteuspojkarna was founded on 15 May 1915. The founder, V. Wiklund, was a pastor and first gathered his confirmands for social fostering; the club took up sports such as football and bandy in its first year. The football team took part in Stockholmsserien Klass 4 from 1918, and played in the system until 1922.

The ice hockey team took part in the Elitserien, then the top level Swedish league, from 1932 to 1935. They then played in its successor league, the Svenska Serien in the 1936–37 and 1942–43 seasons. From 1946 to 1950, and in 1951–52 and 1956–57, Matteuspojkarna played in the top-level Swedish Division I. From 1929 to 1950, the club regularly competed in the single-elimination Swedish Championship. They finished as runner-up in 1948, losing to IK Göta 3–2 in overtime.

In the end of the 1930s, the club took up orienteering and in 1941, it took up cross-country skiing on its programme.

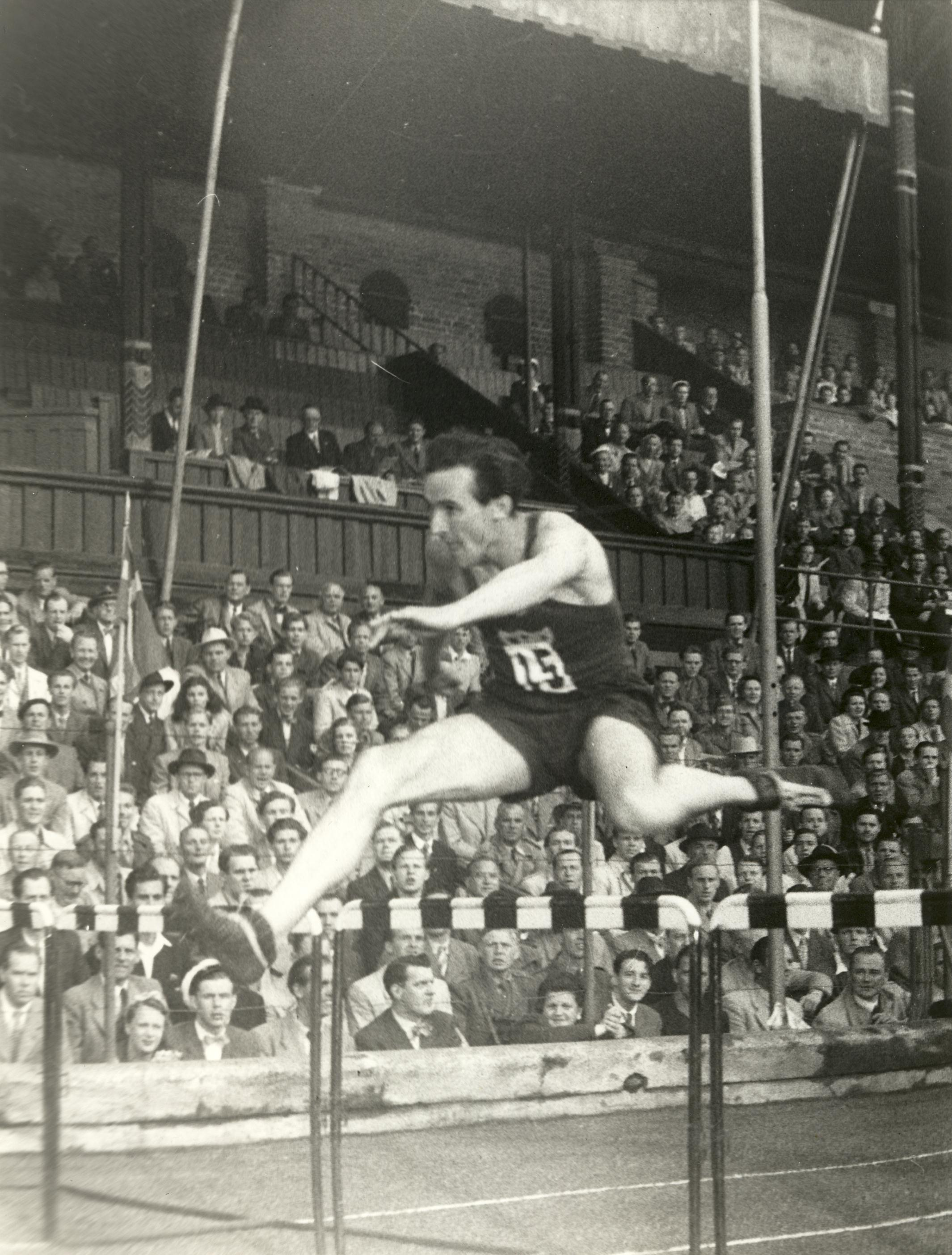
MP athlete Rune Larsson

In athletics, Åke Ödmark was the first Swedish high jumper to clear 2.00 metres. He was the 1939 and 1940 Swedish champion in high jump. Rune Larsson won eight national individual titles in 400 metres and 400 metres hurdles from 1946 to 1951.

The handball department competed in the Swedish men's team handball top division during the 1968–69 season. It currently plays in Division 3.
