= Nacka SK =

- City: Nacka, Sweden
- Operated: 1906–1976
- Colors: Yellow, black

Franchise history
- 1976: Merged with Atlas Copco and Skuru to form NSA-76, now Nacka HK

Nacka SK was a Swedish sports club based in the Stockholm suburb of Nacka. The club was notable in bandy but particularly in ice hockey, having played 23 seasons in the top tier of ice hockey in Sweden, though never managing to win the Swedish championship. The last ice hockey season the club played in the top tier was the 1971–72 Division 1 season. Following seasons in the second tier, and their failure to achieve promotion to Elitserien (now the SHL) in the 1976 qualifiers, the club merged with Atlas Copco IF and Skuru IK to form NSA-76, which was then renamed Nacka HK in 1980.
