= List of Djurgårdens IF (men's hockey) seasons =

This is a list of seasons of Stockholm-based Swedish ice hockey club Djurgårdens IF.

Year	Level	Division	Rstecord		Avg. home atnd.	Notes	Ref
Year	Level	Division	Position	W-T-L W-OT-L	Avg. home atnd.	Notes	Ref
1943–44	Tier 2	Division 2 (mälargruppen)	3rd	6–0–4			
1944–45	Tier 2	Division 2 (south)	2nd	5–2–3			
1945–46	Tier 2	Division 2 (east)	5th	2–0–8			
1946–47	Tier 2	Division 2 (south)	1st	9–0–1 (Note: There is an error in the final standings table for the 1946–47 Division 2 season which implies that the data for Djurgården's performance in that season may be incorrect.)			
1946–47	Division 1 qualifier		?	?		Failed to achieve promotion	
1947–48	Tier 2	Division 2 (east)	1st	9–0–1			
1947–48	Division 1 qualifier		?	?		▲ Promoted to Division 1	
1947–48	Swedish Championship		—	0–1	—	Lost in quarterfinals, 3–4 vs Gävle GIK	
1948–49	Tier 1	Division 1 (south)	2nd	7–1–2			
1948–49	The 1949 Swedish Championship in ice hockey was cancelled.						
1949–50	Tier 1	Division 1 (south)	2nd	6–2–2			
1949–50	Swedish Championship		—	2–0		Won in semifinals, 3–1 vs Hammarby; Won in finals, 7–2 vs Mora IK; (gold) 1950 Swedish Champions (2nd title)	
1950–51	Tier 1	Division 1 (south)	1st	10–0–0			
1950–51	Tier 1	Division 1 Finals	—	2–0–0		Won vs AIK (Game 1: 10–2, Game 2: 6–2); 1950–51 Division 1 season champions	
1951–52	Tier 1	Division 1 (south)	2nd	6–1–3			
1952–53	Tier 1	Division 1 (south)	2nd	7–2–1			
1953–54	Tier 1	Division 1 (south)	1st	9–0–1			
1953–54	Tier 1	Swedish Championship series	—	1–1–0		Won vs Gävle GIK (Game 1: 5–1, Game 2: 1–1); (gold) 1954 Swedish Champions (3rd title)	
1954–55	Tier 1	Division 1 (south)	1st	10–0–0			
1954–55	Tier 1	Swedish Championship series	—	2–0–0		Won vs Hammarby (Game 1: 6–3, Game 2: 11–2); (gold) 1955 Swedish Champions (4th title)	
1955–56	Tier 1	Division 1 (south)	1st	9–0–1			
1955–56	Tier 1	Swedish Championship series	2nd	4–0–2		(silver) Runner-up	
1956–57	Tier 1	Division 1 (south)	1st	12–1–1			
1956–57	Tier 1	Swedish Championship series	2nd	4–0–2		(silver) Runner-up	
1957–58	Tier 1	Division 1 (south)	1st	11–1–2			
1957–58	Tier 1	Swedish Championship series	1st	4–0–2		(gold) 1958 Swedish Champions (5th title)	
1958–59	Tier 1	Division 1 (south)	1st	14–0–0			
1958–59	Tier 1	Swedish Championship series	1st	5–1–0		(gold) 1959 Swedish Champions (6th title)	
1959–60	Tier 1	Division 1 (south)	1st	12–2–0			
1959–60	Tier 1	Swedish Championship series	1st	5–0–1		(gold) 1960 Swedish Champions (7th title)	
1960–61	Tier 1	Division 1 (south)	1st	14–0–0			
1960–61	Tier 1	Swedish Championship series	1st	4–2–0	9,526	(gold) 1961 Swedish Champions (8th title)	
1961–62	Tier 1	Division 1 (south)	1st	13–1–0			
1961–62	Tier 1	Swedish Championship series	1st	6–1–0		(gold) 1962 Swedish Champions (9th title)	
1962–63	Tier 1	Division 1 (south)	2nd	11–0–3			
1962–63	Tier 1	Swedish Championship series	1st	5–1–1		(gold) 1963 Swedish Champions (10th title)	
1963–64	Tier 1	Division 1 (south)	3rd	10–0–4			
1963–64	Tier 1	Swedish Championship series	5th	3–1–3			
1964–65	Tier 1	Division 1 (south)	5th	7–0–7			
1964–65	Tier 1	Qualification round	1st	8–1–3			
1965–66	Tier 1	Division 1 (south)	4th	12–0–9			
1965–66	Tier 1	Swedish Championship playoffs	—	3–2		Won in quarterfinals, 2–0 in games vs AIK; Lost in semifinals, 1–2 in games vs Västra Frölunda IF	
1966–67	Tier 1	Division 1 (south)	4th	13–0–8			
1966–67	Tier 1	Swedish Championship playoffs	—	1–2		Lost in quarterfinals, 1–2 in games vs MoDo AIK	
1967–68	Tier 1	Division 1 (south)	3rd	10–4–7			
1967–68	Tier 1	Final round	4th	3–0–4			
1968–69	Tier 1	Division 1 (south)	5th	6–4–11			
1969–70	Tier 1	Division 1 (north)	7th	3–1–10			
1969–70	Tier 1	Qualification group (north)	2nd	2–3–1			
1970–71	Tier 1	Division 1 (north)	5th	6–3–5			
1970–71	Tier 1	Qualifying round (north)	1st	5–0–1			
1971–72	Tier 1	Division 1 (north)	2nd	9–2–3			
1971–72	Tier 1	Swedish Championship series	5th	5–3–6			
1972–73	Tier 1	Division 1 (north)	3rd	7–2–5			
1972–73	Tier 1	Swedish Championship series	7th	4–1–9			
1973–74	Tier 1	Division 1 (north)	5th	7–0–7			
1973–74	Tier 1	Qualifying round	1st	11–1–12			
1974–75	Tier 1	Division 1	10th	15–3–12			
1974–75	Elitserien qualifier		1st	5–0–1		Qualifies for play in the newly formed Elitserien	
1975–76	Tier 1	Elitserien	9th	14–3–19		▼ Relegated to Division 1	
1976–77	Tier 2	Division 1 (Östra)	1st	28–2–3			
1976–77	Tier 2	Playoff to Elitserien qualifier	—	4–0		1st round: 2–0 vs Bäcken, 2nd round: 2–0 vs Tingsryd	
1976–77	Elitserien qualifier		1st	5–0–1		▲ Promoted to Elitserien	
1977–78	Tier 1	Elitserien	8th	9–7–20			
1978–79	Tier 1	Elitserien	3rd	20–2–14			
1978–79	Tier 1	Swedish Championship playoffs	—		9,194 (Note: Games in home arena only. Excludes "home" matches played at neutral sites.)	Won in semifinals, 2–1 vs Färjestad; (silver) Lost in finals, 1–2 vs MoDo AIK	
1979–80	Tier 1	Elitserien	6th	16–6–14			
1980–81	Tier 1	Elitserien	6th	15–2–19			
1981–82	Tier 1	Elitserien	9th	11–8–17			
1981–82	Elitserien qualifier		2nd	3–1–2	7,696		
1982–83	Tier 1	Elitserien	2nd	21–7–8			
1982–83	Tier 1	Swedish Championship playoffs	—	5–3	9,442	Won in semifinals, 2–1 vs Björklöven; Won in finals, 3–2 vs Färjestads BK; (gold) 1983 Swedish Champions (11th title)	
1983–84	Tier 1	Elitserien	2nd	18–5–13			
1983–84	Tier 1	Swedish Championship playoffs	—	2–4	9,866	Won in semifinals, 2–1 vs Björklöven; Lost in finals, 0–3 vs AIK	
1984–85	Tier 1	Elitserien	1st	22–5–9			
1984–85	Tier 1	Swedish Championship playoffs	—	4–4	7,776	Won in semifinals, 2–1 vs Färjestad; (silver) Lost in finals, 2–3 vs Södertälje	
1985–86	Tier 1	Elitserien	8th	15–3–18			
1986–87	Tier 1	Elitserien	4th	17–5–14			
1986–87	Tier 1	Swedish Championship playoffs	—	0–2	9,381	Lost in semifinals, 0–2 vs Björklöven	
1987–88	Tier 1	Elitserien	1st	27–2–11			
1987–88	Tier 1	Swedish Championship playoffs	—	1–2	9,780	Lost in quarterfinals, 1–2 vs AIK	
1988–89	Tier 1	Elitserien	1st	24–5–11			
1988–89	Tier 1	Swedish Championship playoffs	—	7–1	13,342	Won in quarterfinals, 2–0 vs AIK; Won in semifinals, 2–0 vs Brynäs; Won in finals, 3–1 vs Leksand; (gold) 1989 Swedish Champions (12th title)	
1989–90	Tier 1	Elitserien	2nd	23–6–11			
1989–90	Tier 1	Swedish Championship playoffs	—	7–1	11,944	Won in quarterfinals, 2–0 vs Västerås IK; Won in semifinals, 2–0 vs Luleå; Won in finals, 3–1 vs Färjestad; (gold) 1990 Swedish Champions (13th title)	
1990–91	Tier 1	Elitserien	1st	22–6–12			
1990–91	Tier 1	Swedish Championship playoffs	—	6–1	12,663	Won in quarterfinals, 2–0 vs Södertälje; Won in semifinals, 2–0 vs Västerås IK; Won in finals, 2–1 vs Färjestad; (gold) 1991 Swedish Champions (14th title)	
1991–92	Tier 1	Elitserien	6th	16–11–13			
1991–92	Tier 1	Swedish Championship playoffs	—	6–4	13,256	Won in quarterfinals, 2–0 vs Luleå; Won in semifinals, 2–1 vs Färjestad; (silver) Lost in finals, 2–3 vs Malmö	
1992–93	Tier 1	Elitserien	8th	15–8–17			
1992–93	Tier 1	Swedish Championship playoffs	—	3–3	8,930	Won in quarterfinals, 2–1 vs Västerås IK; Lost in semifinals, 1–2 vs Luleå	
1993–94	Tier 1	Elitserien	5th	17–8–15			
1993–94	Tier 1	Swedish Championship playoffs	—	3–3	10,986	Won in quarterfinals, 3–1 vs Västra Frölunda; Lost in semifinals, 0–2 vs MoDo	
1994–95	Tier 1	Elitserien	1st	24–7–9			
1994–95	Tier 1	Swedish Championship playoffs	—	0–3	7,711	Lost in quarterfinals, 0–3 vs HV71	
1995–96	Tier 1	Elitserien	5th	17–9–14	7,669		
1995–96	Tier 1	Swedish Championship playoffs	—	1–3	7,880	Lost in quarterfinals, 1–3 vs Färjestad	
1996–97	Tier 1	Elitserien	4th	27–5–18	7,895		
1996–97	Tier 1	Swedish Championship playoffs	—	1–3	12,083	Lost in quarterfinals, 1–3 vs AIK	
1997–98	Tier 1	Elitserien	1st	27–6–13			
1997–98	Tier 1	Swedish Championship playoffs	—	8–7	12,224	Won in quarterfinals, 3–2 vs HV 71; Won in semifinals, 3–2 vs MODO; (silver) Lost in finals, 2–3 vs Färjestad	
1998–99	Tier 1	Elitserien	3rd	22–12–16			
1998–99	Tier 1	Swedish Championship playoffs	—	1–3	11,635	Lost in quarterfinals, 1–3 vs Brynäs	
1999–00	Tier 1	Elitserien	1st	23–15–12	7,437	Top scorer: (Norway) Espen Knutsen (53 pts.); Top goalie: (Sweden) Mikael Tellqvist (91.3 SV%)	
1999–00	Tier 1	Swedish Championship playoffs	—	10–3	11,725	Won in quarterfinals, 4–3 vs Färjestad; Won in semifinals, 3–0 vs Luleå; Won in finals, 3–0 vs MODO; (gold) 2000 Swedish Champions (15th title)	
2000–01	Tier 1	Elitserien	1st	30–9–11	8,036	Top scorer: (Sweden) Kristofer Ottosson (41 pts.); Top goalie: (Sweden) Mikael Tellqvist (91.4 SV%)	
2000–01	Tier 1	Swedish Championship playoffs	—	12–4	12,529	Win in quarterfinals, 4–1 vs AIK; Win in semifinals, 4-1 vs Luleå; Win in finals, 4–2 vs Färjestads BK; (gold) 2001 Swedish Champions (16th title)	
2001–02	Tier 1	Elitserien	3rd	27–8–15	7,230	Top scorer: (Sweden) Mikael Håkanson (37 pts.); Top goalie: (Latvia) Sergei Naumov (90.7 SV%)	
2001–02	Tier 1	Swedish Championship playoffs	—	1–4	7,747	Lost in quarterfinals, 1–4 vs Västra Frölunda	
2002–03	Tier 1	Elitserien	4th	26–7–17	6,626	Top scorer: (Sweden) Kristofer Ottosson (38 pts.); Top goalie: (Sweden) Björn Bjurling (92.0 SV%)	
2002–03	Tier 1	Swedish Championship playoffs	—	5–7	8,788	Won in quarterfinals, 4–3 vs HV71; Lost in semifinals, 1–4 vs Färjestad	
2003–04	Tier 1	Elitserien	5th	23–11–16	7,404	Top scorer: (Sweden) Stefan Pettersson (34 pts.); Top goalie: (Sweden) Björn Bjurling (92.3 SV%)	
2003–04	Tier 1	Swedish Championship playoffs	—	0–4	8,801	Lost in quarterfinals, 0–4 vs Frölunda	
2004–05	Tier 1	Elitserien	5th	23–7–20	7,391	Top scorer: (Sweden) Nils Ekman (45 pts.); Top goalie: (Canada) Jose Theodore (91.7 SV%)	
2004–05	Tier 1	Swedish Championship playoffs	—	5–7	9,893	Won in quarterfinals, 4–3 vs Timrå; Lost in semifinals, 1–4 vs Frölunda	
2005–06	Tier 1	Elitserien	10th	13–13–24	6,964	Top scorer: (Sweden) Fredrik Bremberg (49 pts.); Top goalie: (Finland) Teemu Lassila (89.9 SV%)	
2006–07	Tier 1	Elitserien	10th	19–14–22	6,865	Top scorer: (Sweden) Fredrik Bremberg (64 pts.); Top goalie: (Sweden) Daniel Larsson (91.1 SV%)	
2007–08	Tier 1	Elitserien	7th	21–14–20	6,623	Top scorer: (Sweden) Fredrik Bremberg (45 pts.); Top goalie: (Sweden) Daniel Larsson (92.1 SV%)	
2007–08	Tier 1	Swedish Championship playoffs	—	1–4	7,575	Lost in quarterfinals, 1–4 vs Linköping	
2008–09	Tier 1	Elitserien	10th	17–15–23	6,161	Top scorer: (Sweden) F. Bremberg (57 pts.); Top goalie: (Sweden) Gustaf Wesslau (91.4 SV%)	
2009–10	Tier 1	Elitserien	2nd	26–12–17	7,034	Top scorer: (Sweden) M. Nilson (51 pts.); Top goalie: (Sweden) Gustaf Wesslau (91.7 SV%)	
2009–10	Tier 1	Swedish Championship playoffs	—	10–6	10,519	Won in quarterfinals, 4–1 vs Brynäs; Won in semifinals, 4–1 vs Linköping; (silver) Lost in finals, 2–4 vs HV71	
2010–11	Tier 1	Elitserien	6th	22–4–10–19	7,401	Top scorer: (Sweden) M. Krüger (35 pts.); Top goalie: (Sweden) Mark Owuya (92.7 SV%)	
2010–11	Tier 1	Swedish Championship playoffs	—	3–4	10,012	Lost in quarterfinals, 3–4 vs Luleå	
2011–12	Tier 1	Elitserien	11th	15–10–7–23	7,723	Top scorer: (Sweden) M. Nilson (32 pts.)	
2011–12	Elitserien qualifier		3rd	4–1–1–4	6,234	▼ Relegated to HockeyAllsvenskan	
2012–13	Tier 2	HockeyAllsvenskan	5th	26–3–8–15	6,184	Top scorer: (Sweden) P. Åberg (40 pts.)	
2012–13	Tier 2	Qualifying playoffs	3rd	2–0–1–3	5,750		
2013–14	Tier 2	HockeyAllsvenskan	3rd	23–8–11–10	6,142		
2013–14	SHL qualifier		2nd	5–1–0–4	8,054	▲ Promoted to the SHL	
2014–15	Tier 1	SHL	9th	15–9–8–27	7,924	Top scorer: (Sweden) M. Sörensen (32 pts.)	
2014–15	Tier 1	Swedish Championship playoffs	—	0–2	8,094	Lost play-in, 2-0 vs Luleå	
2015–16	Tier 1	SHL	7th	23–5–7–17	7,335	Top scorer: (Norway) P. Thoresen (48 points)	
2015–16	Tier 1	Swedish Championship playoffs	—	3–5	7,639	Won in Round of 16, 2-1 vs Brynäs; Lost quarterfinals, 4–1 vs Frölunda	
2016–17	Tier 1	SHL	10th	15–7–11–19	6,989	Top scorer: (United States) M. Anderson (34 points)	
2016–17	Tier 1	Swedish Championship playoffs	—	1–2	8,094	Lost in Round of 16, 2-1 vs Färjestad	
2017–18	Tier 1	SHL	2nd	23–9–8–12	7,169	Top scorer: (Sweden) P. Lund (40 points)	
2017–18	Tier 1	Swedish Championship playoffs	—	6–5	9,028	Won in quarterfinals, 4–1 vs Linköping; Lost in semifinals, 2–4 vs Skellefteå	
2018–19	Tier 1	SHL	4th	23–5–7–17	7,355	Top scorer: (Sweden) J. Lilja (37 points)	
2018–19	Tier 1	Swedish Championship playoffs	—	10–9	10,013	Won in quarterfinals, 4–2 vs Skellefteå; Won in semifinals, 4–3 vs Färjestad; (silver) Lost in finals, 2–4 vs Frölunda	
2019–20	Tier 1	SHL	6th	24–5–6–17		Top scorer: (Sweden) L. Hultström (32 points)	
2019–20	Tier 1	Swedish Championship playoffs	—	—	—	Cancelled due to Covid-19 pandemic	
