= List of Swedish ice hockey champions =

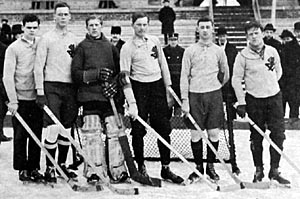
IK Göta won the inaugural Swedish Championship in 1922.

The Swedish ice hockey champions (Swedish: Svenska mästare i ishockey) is a title awarded annually to the winning playoff team of the top-tier ice hockey league in Sweden, which currently is the Swedish Hockey League (SHL) since 1975. It was first awarded to IK Göta in 1922, the championship's inaugural year. The championship's present SHL format did not take into effect until the league was originally formed for the 1975–76 season under the name of Elitserien. A team who wins the Swedish Championship is awarded the Le Mat Trophy. Djurgårdens IF holds the most titles in history with 16 titles. The most recent Swedish Champions are Skellefteå AIK, who won their fifth title in club history in 2026.

Before 1953, the Swedish champions were determined through a standalone tournament, the Swedish Ice Hockey Championship, where teams could submit their participation. In other words, the leagues were not connected with the Swedish Championship during this period. Between 1953 and 1955, the winner was decided through matches between the winners of Division 1 Norra and Division 1 Södra. From 1956 to 1965, the Swedish champions was the winner of a second round group stage following Division 1. In the years of 1966 and 1967 a play-off was played between Division 1 teams and the 1968 season saw a return to second round group stage. In the 1975–76 season, the Elitserien was started and from the last season with Division 1, 1974–75, playoffs for the top four teams decided the Swedish ice hockey champions. From 1987–88, eight teams have played the championships, and from 2013–14 ten teams. (The league was expanded from 10 to 12 teams in 1987–88, and from 12 to 14 teams in 2015–16.)

== Previous winners ==
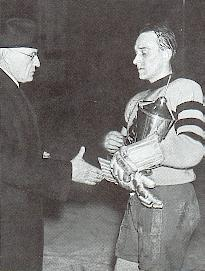
AIK's Axel Nilsson receiving the Le Mat Trophy in 1938

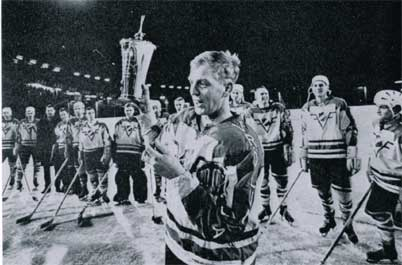
Västra Frölunda IF's Lars-Eric Lundvall receiving the Le Mat Trophy in 1965.

Season	Winners	Runners-up
1922	IK Göta (1)	Hammarby IF
1923	IK Göta (2)	Djurgårdens IF
1924	IK Göta (3)	Djurgårdens IF
1925	Södertälje SK (1)	Västerås SK
1926	Djurgårdens IF (1)	Västerås SK
1927	IK Göta (4)	Djurgårdens IF
1928	IK Göta (5)	Södertälje SK
1929	IK Göta (6)	Södertälje SK
1930	IK Göta (7)	AIK
1931	Södertälje SK (2)	Hammarby IF
1932	Hammarby IF (1)	Södertälje SK
1933	Hammarby IF (2)	IK Göta
1934	AIK (1)	Hammarby IF
1935	AIK (2)	Hammarby IF
1936	Hammarby IF (3)	AIK
1937	Hammarby IF (4)	Södertälje SK
1938	AIK (3)	Hammarby IF
1939	No competition (Note: No competition due to cold weather. Hammarby IF won the Svenska Serien season.)	
1940	IK Göta (8)	AIK
1941	Södertälje SK (3)	IK Göta
1942	Hammarby IF (5)	Södertälje SK
1943	Hammarby IF (6)	IK Göta
1944	Södertälje SK (4)	Hammarby IF
1945	Hammarby IF (7)	Södertälje SK
1946	AIK (4)	Södertälje SK
1947	AIK (5)	IK Göta
1948	IK Göta (9)	UoIF Matteuspojkarna
1949	No competition (Note: No competition due to preparations for the 1949 World Championships. Hammarby IF won the Division I season.)	
1950	Djurgårdens IF (2)	Mora IK
1951	Hammarby IF (8)	Södertälje SK
1952	No competition (Note: No competition due to preparations for the 1952 Winter Olympics. Södertälje SK won the Division I season.)	
1953	Södertälje SK (5)	Hammarby IF
1954	Djurgårdens IF (3)	Gävle Godtemplares IK
1955	Djurgårdens IF (4)	Hammarby IF
1956	Södertälje SK (6)	Djurgårdens IF
1957	Gävle Godtemplares IK (1)	Djurgårdens IF
1958	Djurgårdens IF (5)	Skellefteå AIK
1959	Djurgårdens IF (6)	Leksands IF
1960	Djurgårdens IF (7)	Södertälje SK
1961	Djurgårdens IF (8)	Skellefteå AIK
1962	Djurgårdens IF (9)	Västra Frölunda IF
1963	Djurgårdens IF (10)	Skellefteå AIK
1964	Brynäs IF (1)	Leksands IF
1965	Västra Frölunda IF (1)	Brynäs IF
1966	Brynäs IF (2)	Västra Frölunda IF
1967	Brynäs IF (3)	Västra Frölunda IF
1968	Brynäs IF (4)	AIK
1969	Leksands IF (1)	Brynäs IF
1970	Brynäs IF (5)	Västra Frölunda IF
1971	Brynäs IF (6)	Leksands IF
1972	Brynäs IF (7)	Leksands IF
1973	Leksands IF (2)	Södertälje SK
1974	Leksands IF (3)	Timrå IK
1975	Leksands IF (4)	Brynäs IF
1976	Brynäs IF (8)	Färjestad BK
1977	Brynäs IF (9)	Färjestad BK
1978	Skellefteå AIK (1)	AIK
1979	Modo AIK (1)	Djurgårdens IF
1980	Brynäs IF (10)	Västra Frölunda IF
1981	Färjestad BK (1)	AIK
1982	AIK (6)	IF Björklöven
1983	Djurgårdens IF (11)	Färjestad BK
1984	AIK (7)	Djurgårdens IF
1985	Södertälje SK (7)	Djurgårdens IF
1986	Färjestad BK (2)	Södertälje SK
1987	IF Björklöven (1)	Färjestad BK
1988	Färjestad BK (3)	IF Björklöven
1989	Djurgårdens IF (12)	Leksands IF
1990	Djurgårdens IF (13)	Färjestad BK
1991	Djurgårdens IF (14)	Färjestad BK
1992	Malmö IF (1)	Djurgårdens IF
1993	Brynäs IF (11)	Luleå HF
1994	Malmö IF (2)	Modo Hockey
1995	HV71 (1)	Brynäs IF
1996	Luleå HF (2)	Västra Frölunda HC
1997	Färjestad BK (4)	Luleå HF
1998	Färjestad BK (5)	Djurgårdens IF
1999	Brynäs IF (12)	Modo Hockey
2000	Djurgårdens IF (15)	Modo Hockey
2001	Djurgårdens IF (16)	Färjestad BK
2002	Färjestad BK (6)	Modo Hockey
2003	Västra Frölunda HC (2)	Färjestad BK
2004	HV71 (2)	Färjestad BK
2005	Frölunda HC (3)	Färjestad BK
2006	Färjestad BK (7)	Frölunda HC
2007	Modo Hockey (2)	Linköping HC
2008	HV71 (3)	Linköping HC
2009	Färjestad BK (8)	HV71
2010	HV71 (4)	Djurgårdens IF
2011	Färjestad BK (9)	Skellefteå AIK
2012	Brynäs IF (13)	Skellefteå AIK
2013	Skellefteå AIK (2)	Luleå HF
2014	Skellefteå AIK (3)	Färjestad BK
2015	Växjö Lakers (1)	Skellefteå AIK
2016	Frölunda HC (4)	Skellefteå AIK
2017	HV71 (5)	Brynäs IF
2018	Växjö Lakers (2)	Skellefteå AIK
2019	Frölunda HC (5)	Djurgårdens IF
2020	No competition (Note: No playoffs due to the COVID-19 pandemic in Sweden. Luleå HF won the regular season.)	
2021	Växjö Lakers (3)	Rögle BK
2022	Färjestad BK (10)	Luleå HF
2023	Växjö Lakers (4)	Skellefteå AIK
2024	Skellefteå AIK (4)	Rögle BK
2025	Luleå HF (2)	Brynäs IF
2026	Skellefteå AIK (5)	Rögle BK

== Title champions ==
Titles	Club
16	Djurgårdens IF
13	Brynäs IF
10	Färjestad BK
9	IK Göta
8	Hammarby IF
7	AIK
7	Södertälje SK
5	Frölunda HC
5	HV71
5	Skellefteå AIK
4	Leksands IF
4	Växjö Lakers
2	Malmö IF
2	Modo Hockey
2	Luleå HF
1	IF Björklöven
1	Gävle Godtemplares IK

Champions since the formation of the Swedish Hockey League (formerly named Elitserien) in 1975:

Titles	Club
11	Färjestad BK
6	Brynäs IF
6	Skellefteå AIK
6	Djurgårdens IF
5	HV71
4	Frölunda HC
4	Växjö Lakers
4	Skellefteå AIK
2	AIK
2	Malmö IF
2	Modo Hockey
2	Luleå HF
1	IF Björklöven
1	Södertälje SK

== See also ==
- List of Swedish ice hockey junior champions
- Marathon standings for the top Swedish ice hockey league
- Marathon SHL standings
- List of SHL seasons
