= List of Mora IK seasons =

This is a list of seasons completed by Mora IK whilst competing in the HockeyAllsvenskan and the Swedish Hockey League.

List of Mora IK seasons
Year	Level	League	Record		Notes	Ref
Year	Level	League	Position	W–T–L W–OT–L	Notes	Ref
1944–45	Tier 2	Division 2 North	1st	6–1–3		
1944–45	1945 Division 1 qualifier		?	?	▲ Promoted to Division 1	
1944–45	1945 Swedish Championships		–	1–1	Eliminated in quarterfinals by Karlbergs BK	
1945–46	Tier 1	Division 1 North	4th	2–2–6	First season in Sweden's top hockey league	
1945–46	1946 Swedish Championships		–	3–1	Eliminated in quarterfinals by IK Göta	
1946–47	Tier 1	Division 1 North	4th	6–0–4		
1946–47	1947 Swedish Championships		–	1–1	Eliminated in quarterfinals by AIK	
1947–48	Tier 1	Division 1 North	4th	3–1–6		
1947–48	1948 Swedish Championships		–	0–1	Eliminated in 2nd round by Gävle GIK	
1948–49	Tier 1	Division 1 North	6th	2–1–7	▼ Relegated to Division 2	
1949–50	Tier 2	Division 2 North	1st	9–0–1	▲ Promoted to Division 1	
1949–50	1950 Swedish Championships		–	2–1	(silver) Lost in finals to Djurgårdens IF (7–2)	
1950–51	Tier 1	Division 1 North	4th	4–0–6		
1951–52	Tier 1	Division 1 North	5th	2–1–7	▼ Relegated to Division 2	
1952–53	Tier 2	Division 2 North	1st	8–1–1	▲ Promoted to Division 1	
1953–54	Tier 1	Division 1 North	5th	2–2–6	▼ Relegated to Division 2	
1954–55	Tier 2	Division 2 North A	1st	5–2–1		
1954–55	1955 Division 1 qualifier					
1955–56	Tier 2	Division 2 North	1st	9–0–1		
1955–56	1956 Division 1 qualifier				▲ Promoted to Division 1	
1956–57	Tier 1	Division 1 North	6th	5–1–8		
1957–58	Tier 1	Division 1 North	5th	4–2–8		
1958–59	Tier 1	Division 1 North	7th	4–1–9	▼ Relegated to Division 2	
1959–60	Tier 2	Division 2 East A	1st	11–2–1		
1959–60	1960 Division 1 qualifier					
1960–61	Tier 2	Division 2 East A	3rd	8–1–5		
1961–62	Tier 2	Division 2 East A	1st	12–2–0		
1961–62	1962 Division 1 North qualifier				▲ Promoted to Division 1	
1962–63	Tier 1	Division 1 North	6th	4–1–9		
1962–63	1963 Division 1 North qualifier		6th	3–0–4	▼ Relegated to Division 2	
1963–64	Tier 2	Division 2 East A	1st	17–0–1		
1963–64	1964 Division 1 North qualifier				▲ Promoted to Division 1	
1964–65	Tier 1	Division 1 North	8th	1–3–10		
1964–65	Tier 1	1965 Division 1 North qualifier	4th	0–2–10	▼ Relegated to Division 2	
1965–66	Tier 2	Division 2 East A	1st	18–0–0		
1965–66	1966 Division 1 North qualifier				▲ Promoted to Division 1	
1966–67	Tier 1	Division 1 North	2nd	11–4–6		
1966–67	Tier 1	1967 Swedish Championship Playoffs	–	0–2	Eliminated in quarterfinals by Västra Frölunda IF (Game 1: 2–8, Game 2: 4–7)	
1967–68	Tier 1	Division 1 North	3rd	12–3–6		
1967–68	Tier 1	1968 Swedish Championship Series	7th	2–1–4		
1968–69	Tier 1	Division 1 North	4th	11–5–5		
1968–69	Tier 1	1969 Swedish Championship Series	8th	1–1–5		
1969–70	Tier 1	Division 1 South	3rd	8–1–5		
1969–70	Tier 1	1970 Swedish Championship Series	7th	4–0–10		
1970–71	Tier 1	Division 1 South	7th	2–1–11		
1970–71	Division 1 South qualifier		1st	4–1–1		
1971–72	Tier 1	Division 1 South	7th	2–3–9		
1971–72	Division 1 South qualifier		3rd	3–0–3		
1972–72	Tier 1	Division 1 South	8th	1–1–12		
1972–72	Division 1 South qualifier		3rd	3–1–2		
1973–74	Tier 1	Division 1 South	7th	2–1–11		
1973–74	Division 1 qualifier		3rd	10–0–4		
1974–75	Tier 1	Division 1 ("Allsvenskan")	12th	8–4–18	▼ Relegated to Division 1 (Elitserien formed as new league at tier 1)	
1975–76	Tier 2	Division 1 Västra	1st	16–4–2		
1975–76	Tier 2	Playoff to Elitserien qualifier	–	3–1–0	1st round win vs IFK Luleå (2–0 in games); 2nd round win vs Strömsbro IF (2–0 in games)	
1975–76	1976 Elitserien qualifier		3rd	3–1–2		
1976–77	Tier 2	Division 1 Västra	2nd	18–1–3		
1976–77	Tier 2	Playoff to Elitserien qualifier	–	3–2	1st round win vs IFK Kiruna (2–0 in games); Eliminated in 2nd round by Timrå IK (1–2 in games)	
1977–78	Tier 2	Division 1 Västra	1st	24–1–2		
1977–78	Tier 2	Playoff to Elitserien qualifier	–	2–2	1st round win vs Kiruna AIF (2–0 in games); Eliminated in 2nd round by IFK Kiruna (0–2 in games)	
1978–79	Tier 2	Division 1 Västra	1st	22–1–4		
1978–79	Tier 2	Playoff to Elitserien qualifier	–	2–3	2nd round win vs Nybro IF (2–1 in games); Eliminated in 3rd round by HV 71 (0–2 in games)	
1979–80	Tier 2	Division 1 Västra	1st	24–0–3		
1979–80	Tier 2	Playoff to Elitserien qualifier	–	4–1	1st round win vs Nybro IF (2–0 in games); 2nd round win vs Karlskrona IK (2–1 in games)	
1979–80	1980 Elitserien qualifier		3rd	2–0–2		
1980–81	Tier 2	Division 1 Västra	1st	22–2–3	Bye to 2nd round of playoffs	
1980–81	Tier 2	Playoff to Elitserien qualifier	–	2–3	2nd round win vs Kiruna AIF (2–1 in games); Eliminated in 3rd round by Hammarby IF (0–2 in games)	
1981–82	Tier 2	Division 1 Västra	2nd	25–3–8	Bye to 2nd round of playoffs	
1981–82	Tier 2	Playoff to Elitserien qualifier	–	2–2	2nd round win vs IF Troja (2–0 in games); Eliminated in 3rd round by Södertälje SK (0–2 in games)	
1982–83	Tier 2	Division 1 Västra	1st	15–1–2		
1982–83	Tier 2	Allsvenskan	7th	5–1–8		
1983–84	Tier 2	Division 1 Västra	1st	13–1–4		
1983–84	Tier 2	Allsvenskan	4th	6–2–6	Bye to 2nd round of playoffs	
1983–84	Tier 2	Playoff to Elitserien qualifier	–	0–2	Eliminated in 2nd round by IK VIK-Hockey (0–2 in games)	
1984–85	Tier 2	Division 1 Västra	4th	8–2–8		
1984–85	Tier 2	Division 1 Västra continuation	2nd	21–2–9		
1984–85	Tier 2	Playoff to HockeyAllsvenskan	–	3–2	1st round win vs Timrå IK (2–0 in games); Eliminated in 2nd round by Västra Frölunda HC (1–2 in games)	
1985–86	Tier 2	Division 1 Västra	3rd	11–2–5		
1985–86	Tier 2	Division 1 Västra continuation	1st	22–3–7		
1985–86	Tier 2	Playoff to Elitserien qualifier	–	0–2	Eliminated in 1st round by Malmö IF (0–2 in games)	
1986–87	Tier 2	Division 1 Västra	4th	11–1–6		
1986–87	Tier 2	Division 1 Västra continuation	2nd	9–0–5		
1987–88	Tier 2	Division 1 Västra	6th	8–1–9		
1987–88	Tier 2	Division 1 Västra continuation	2nd	9–3–2		
1987–88	Tier 2	Playoff to Elitserien qualifier	–	0–2	Eliminated in 1st round by Timrå IK (0–2 in games)	
1988–89	Tier 2	Division 1 Västra	4th	10–0–8		
1988–89	Tier 2	Division 1 Västra continuation	1st	9–1–4		
1988–89	Tier 2	Playoff to Elitserien qualifier	–	1–2	Eliminated in 1st round by Mölndals IF (1–2 in games)	
1989–90	Tier 2	Division 1 Västra	2nd	12–2–4		
1989–90	Tier 2	Allsvenskan	9th	3–1–14		
1990–91	Tier 2	Division 1 Västra	2nd	13–2–3		
1990–91	Tier 2	Allsvenskan	5th	8–3–7	Bye to 2nd round of playoffs	
1990–91	Tier 2	Playoff to Elitserien qualifier	–	0–2	Eliminated in 2nd round by Rögle BK	
1991–92	Tier 2	Division 1 Västra	1st	10–5–3		
1991–92	Tier 2	Allsvenskan	5th	9–3–6	Bye to 2nd round of playoffs	
1991–92	Tier 2	Playoff to Elitserien qualifier	–	0–2	Eliminated in 2nd round by IK Vita Hästen (0–2 in games)	
1992–93	Tier 2	Division 1 Östra	1st	15–2–1		
1992–93	Tier 2	Allsvenskan	6th	7–2–9	Bye to 2nd round of playoffs	
1992–93	Tier 2	Playoff to Elitserien qualifier	–	2–3	2nd round win vs IF Sundsvall/Timrå Hockey (2–1 in games); Eliminated in 3rd round by IF Troja/Ljungby (0–2 in games)	
1993–94	Tier 2	Division 1 Västra	2nd	12–5–1		
1993–94	Tier 2	Allsvenskan	5th	6–5–7	Bye to 2nd round of playoffs	
1993–94	Tier 2	Playoff to Elitserien qualifier	–	2–3	2nd round win vs Hammarby IF (2–1 in games); Eliminated in 3rd round by IK Vita Hästen (0–2 in games)	
1994–95	Tier 2	Division 1 Västra	1st	11–6–1		
1994–95	Tier 2	Allsvenskan	8th	5–4–9	Bye to 2nd round of playoffs	
1994–95	Tier 2	Playoff to Elitserien qualifier	–	1–2	Eliminated in 2nd round by IK Pantern (1–2 in games)	
1995–96	Tier 2	Division 1 Västra	1st	16–0–2		
1995–96	Tier 2	Allsvenskan	8th	6–2–10	Bye to 2nd round of playoffs	
1995–96	Tier 2	Playoff to Elitserien qualifier	–	3–3	2nd round win vs Grums IK (2–1 in games); Eliminated in 3rd round vs Rögle BK (1–2 in games)	
1996–97	Tier 2	Division 1 Västra	1st	14–2–2		
1996–97	Tier 2	Allsvenskan	5th	6–2–6	Bye to 2nd round of playoffs	
1996–97	Tier 2	Playoff to Elitserien qualifier	–	4–1		
1996–97	1997 Elitserien qualifier		4th	4–1–5		
1997–98	Tier 2	Division 1 Västra	1st	12–2–2		
1997–98	Tier 2	Allsvenskan	4th	8–2–4	Bye to 2nd round of playoffs	
1997–98	Tier 2	Playoff to Elitserien qualifier	–	2–1–1	2nd round win vs Rögle BK (2–0 in games); Eliminated in 3rd round by IF Björklöven (0–1–1 in games)	
1998–99	Tier 2	Division 1 Västra	1st	19–5–4		
1998–99	Tier 2	Allsvenskan	3rd	7–4–3	Bye to 2nd round of playoffs	
1998–99	Tier 2	Playoff to Elitserien qualifier	–	4–0	2nd round win vs Rögle BK (2–0 in games); 3rd round win vs Timrå IK (2–0 in games)	
1998–99	1999 Elitserien qualifier		3rd	4–3–3		
1999–00	Tier 2	Allsvenskan South	2nd	20–2–5–5		
1999–00	Tier 2	SuperAllsvenskan	6th	4–0–2–8		
1999–00	Tier 2	Playoff to Elitserien qualifier	–	3–2	1st round win vs Hammarby IF (2–0 in games); Eliminated in 2nd round by IK Nyköpings NH 90 (1–2 in games)	
2000–01	Tier 2	Allsvenskan North	8th	8–0–4–14		
2000–01	Tier 2	Allsvenskan North continuation	2nd	9–0–3		
2000–01	Tier 2	Playoff to Elitserien qualifier	–	3–3	1st round win vs Tingsryds AIF (2–1 in games); Eliminated in 2nd round by Hammarby IF (1–2 in games)	
2001–02	Tier 2	Allsvenskan South	6th	15–1–2–14		
2001–02	Tier 2	Allsvenskan South continuation	1st	8–3–0–3		
2001–02	Tier 2	Playoff to Elitserien qualifier	–	1–2	Eliminated in 1st round by Skellefteå AIK (1–2 in games)	
2002–03	Tier 2	Allsvenskan South	2nd	18–3–3–4		
2002–03	Tier 2	SuperAllsvenskan	7th	3–2–1–8		
2003–04	Tier 2	Allsvenskan South	2nd	17–7–8		
2003–04	Tier 2	Superallsvenskan	1st	8-2–2–2		
2003–04	2004 Elitserien qualifier		2nd	5–1–0–4	▲ Promoted to Elitserien	
2004–05	Tier 1	Elitserien	9th	16–10–24		
2005–06	Tier 1	Elitserien	8th	17–11–22		
2005–06	Tier 1	2006 Swedish Championship playoffs	–	1–4	Eliminated in 1st round (1–4 in games vs HV71)	
2006–07	Tier 1	Elitserien	8th	23–9–23		
2006–07	Tier 1	2007 Swedish Championship playoffs	–	0–4	Eliminated in 1st round (0–4 in games vs Färjestads BK)	
2007–08	Tier 1	Elitserien	11th	17–13–25		
2007–08	2008 Elitserien qualifier		4th	5–1–4	▼ Relegated to HockeyAllsvenskan	
2008–09	Tier 2	HockeyAllsvenskan	4th	22–5–4–14		
2008–09	Tier 2	Playoff to Elitserien qualifier	—	1–0–1–1	Eliminated in 1st round (1–2 in games vs Almtuna IS)	
2009–10	Tier 2	HockeyAllsvenskan	7th	24–3–6–19		
2009–10	Tier 2	Playoff to Elitserien qualifier	—	0–0–1–1	Eliminated in 1st round (0–2 in games vs Almtuna IS)	
2010–11	Tier 2	HockeyAllsvenskan	7th	23–3–9–17		
2010–11	Tier 2	Playoff to Elitserien qualifier	1st	6–0–0–0		
2010–11	2011 Elitserien qualifier		6th	2–0–0–8		
2011–12	Tier 2	HockeyAllsvenskan	8th	22–5–4–21		
2012–13	Tier 2	HockeyAllsvenskan	8th	20–7–2–23		
2013–14	Tier 2	HockeyAllsvenskan	6th	19–9–5–19		
2013–14	Tier 2	Playoff to Elitserien qualifier	4th	1–0–1–4		
2014–15	Tier 2	HockeyAllsvenskan	7th	22–3–7–20		
2014–15	Tier 2	HockeyAllsvenskan playoffs	5th	1–0–3–1		
2015–16	Tier 2	HockeyAllsvenskan	6th	20–6–6–20		
2015–16	Tier 2	HockeyAllsvenskan playoffs	2nd	3–1–0–1		
2016–17	Tier 2	HockeyAllsvenskan	1st	31–4–4–13		
2016–17	Tier 2	HockeyAllsvenskan finals	—	3–0–0–0	Won 3–0 in games vs BIK Karlskoga	
2016–17	SHL qualifiers		—	4–0–0–2	Won 4–2 in games vs Leksands IF ▲ Promoted to the SHL	
2017–18	Tier 1	SHL	13th	13–5–2–32		
2017–18	SHL qualifiers		—	4–0–0–1	Won 4–1 in games vs Leksands IF	
2018–19	Tier 1	SHL	13th	13–9–3–27		
2018–19	SHL qualifiers		—	1–0–1–3	Lost 1–4 in games vs Leksands IF ▼Relegated to HockeyAllsvenskan	
