= Tord Lundström =

Swedish ice hockey player and coach

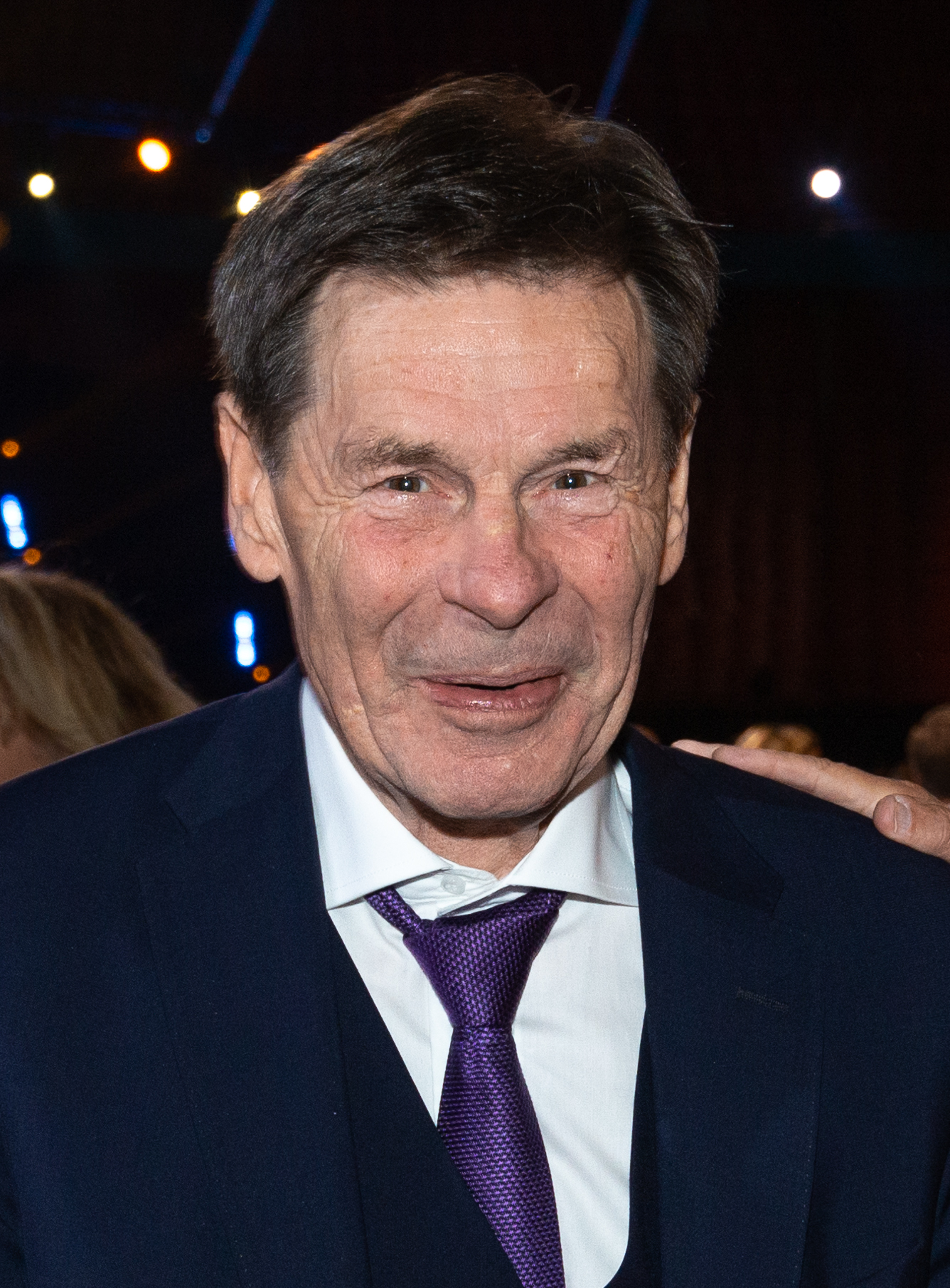
- Lundström in 2022
- Born: 4 March 1945 (age 80) Kiruna, Sweden
- Height: 5 ft 11 in (180 cm)
- Weight: 176 lb (80 kg; 12 st 8 lb)
- Position: Left wing
- Shot: Left
- Played for: Kiruna AIF; Brynäs IF; Detroit Red Wings; Mörrums GoIS
- National team: Sweden
- Playing career: 1960–1980

Medal record

Representing Sweden

Ice hockey

World Championships
Silver medal – second place	1969 Sweden	
Silver medal – second place	1970 Sweden	
Silver medal – second place	1973 Soviet Union	
Bronze medal – third place	1965 Finland	
Bronze medal – third place	1971 Switzerland	
Bronze medal – third place	1975 West Germany	

Tord Göte Lundstrom (born 4 March 1945) is a retired Swedish professional ice hockey player and coach. Lundström won the Swedish Championship nine times playing for Brynäs IF, he also played for the Detroit Red Wings of the National Hockey League (NHL).

In 2011, Lundstrom was inducted into the IIHF Hall of Fame.

== Career ==
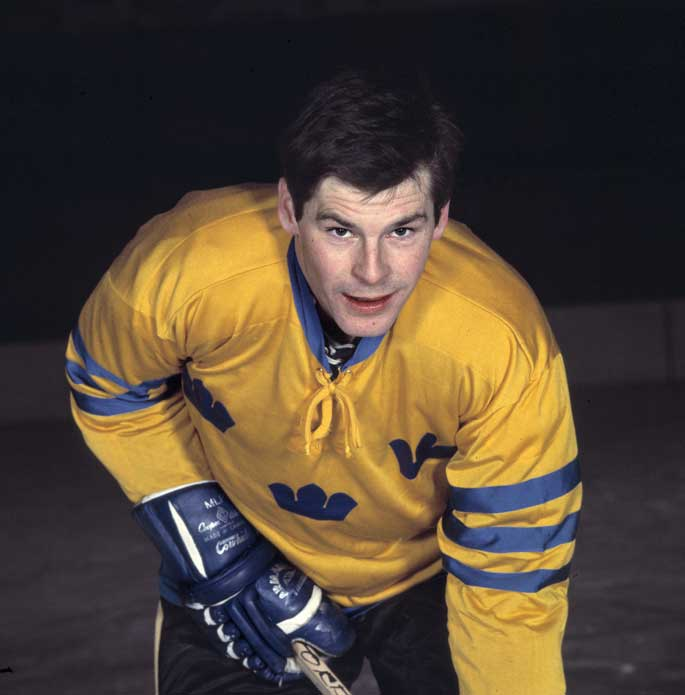
Tord Lundström

Growing up in Kiruna, Sweden, Lundström attributed his love of hockey began after watching Eilert Määttä win the 1957 World Cup. Although he played hockey, Lundström was also interested in football and wrestling.

At 18, Lundström played his last season for Kiruna AIF before moving to Brynäs. That same year, he made his national team debut in November 1963. In his national team career, Lundström played in 200 games, including nine IIHF World Championships and the Olympic Games. He competed as a member of the Sweden men's national ice hockey team at the 1968 and 1972 Winter Olympics. Lundström then moved to North America where he joined the Detroit Red Wings of the National Hockey League (NHL) for the 1973–94 season. During that season, he became the second Swedish forward to score an NHL goal. After injuring his shoulder, Lundström broke his contract and left the NHL to join the London Lions in England for the rest of the season. He subsequently returned to Brynäs IF for the 1974–1975 season.

After retiring as a player, Lundström turned to coaching before working as a property manager in 2010. In 2011, he was inducted into the IIHF Hall of Fame and later the Swedish Hockey Hall of Fame. His number 6 was also retired by Brynäs IF.

== Career statistics ==
=== Regular season and playoffs ===
			Regular season					Playoffs
Season	Team	League	GP	G	A	Pts	PIM	GP	G	A	Pts	PIM
1960–61	Kiruna AIF	Swe-2	—	—	—	—	—	—	—	—	—	—
1961–62	Kiruna AIF	Swe-2	16	15	6	21	4	—	—	—	—	—
1962–63	Kiruna AIF	Swe-2	20	32	12	44	8	—	—	—	—	—
1963–64	Brynäs Gävle IF	Swe-1	14	10	6	16	8	7	7	7	14	11
1964–65	Brynäs Gävle IF	Swe-1	14	14	10	24	4	14	17	12	29	4
1965–66	Brynäs Gävle IF	Swe-1	14	10	9	19	4	7	7	5	12	6
1966–67	Brynäs Gävle IF	Swe-1	14	18	6	24	12	6	5	6	11	0
1967–68	Brynäs Gävle IF	Swe-1	14	15	14	29	4	7	6	7	13	2
1968–69	Brynäs Gävle IF	Swe-1	14	7	8	15	2	7	6	6	12	6
1969–70	Brynäs Gävle IF	Swe-1	14	17	10	27	8	14	10	6	16	6
1970–71	Brynäs Gävle IF	Swe-1	14	17	13	30	2	14	9	16	25	11
1971–72	Brynäs Gävle IF	Swe-1	14	8	6	14	4	14	9	10	19	4
1972–73	Brynäs Gävle IF	Swe-1	14	16	11	27	4	14	10	4	14	6
1973–74	Detroit Red Wings	NHL	11	1	1	2	0	—	—	—	—	—
1973–74	London Lions	Britain	45	38	31	69	24	—	—	—	—	—
1974–75	Brynäs Gävle IF	Swe-1	21	15	17	32	32	6	0	3	3	2
1975–76	Brynäs Gävle IF	SEL	35	21	27	48	16	7	4	1	5	0
1976–77	Brynäs Gävle IF	SEL	36	16	19	35	37	4	1	7	8	0
1977–78	Brynäs Gävle IF	SEL	36	20	15	35	28	3	0	1	1	0
1978–79	Brynäs Gävle IF	SEL	36	12	13	25	29	—	—	—	—	—
1979–80	Mörrums GoIS	Swe-2	4	1	1	2	2	—	—	—	—	—
SEL totals			143	69	74	143	110	14	5	9	14	0
Swe-1 totals			161	147	110	257	84	110	86	82	168	61

=== International ===
Year	Team	Event	GP	G	A	Pts	PIM
1965	Sweden	WC	7	6	3	9	4
1966	Sweden	WC	7	0	1	1	4
1968	Sweden	OLY	7	2	3	5	6
1969	Sweden	WC	10	5	2	7	12
1970	Sweden	WC	10	5	5	10	0
1971	Sweden	WC	10	6	4	10	4
1972	Sweden	OLY	6	3	2	5	2
1973	Sweden	WC	10	3	2	5	0
1975	Sweden	WC	10	11	4	15	2
1976	Sweden	CC	5	1	3	4	6
Senior totals			82	42	29	71	40
