= Marathon standings for the top Swedish ice hockey league =

The marathon standings for the top Swedish ice hockey league refers to a summation of the final regular season standings for all seasons of all of the leagues that have functioned as the highest tier of Swedish ice hockey. This includes Klass I (1922–27), the original Elitserien (1927–35), Svenska Serien (1935–44), Division I (1944–75), and the Swedish Hockey League (SHL) under both its former name (Elitserien, 1975–2013) and its current name (2013 to present).

== Standings as of 2016–17 season ==
RK	Adj. RK (Note: Ranking based on points adjusted for 3-point system)	Club	Cur. SHL? (Note: Indicates if team is currently competing in top-tier league, SHL.)	Seasons	GP	W	T OT	L	GF	GA	PTS	OTW	OTL	SOW	SOL	Adj. PTS (Note: Points applying a three point system to all seasons, including those when a two-point system was in place)
1	1	Djurgårdens IF (Note: Djurgårdens IF includes seasons competing under the name "Djurgårdens IF IF")	Yes	73	2056	1012	333	711	7530	6193	2727	31	33	32	28	3546
2	2	Färjestad BK	Yes	45	1783	899	319	565	6528	5292	2567	40	40	22	26	3078
3	3	Brynäs IF	Yes	56	1947	881	319	747	7067	6258	2432	43	43	22	26	3027
4	4	MODO Hockey (Note: MODO Hockey includes seasons under the names "MoDo AIK", "MoDo Hockey", "MoDo HK", and "Alfredshems IK")		52	1873	765	335	773	6286	6188	2264	58	32	21	30	2709
5	5	Frölunda HC (Note: Frölunda HC includes seasons competing under the names "Västra Frölunda IF" and "Västra Frölunda HC".)	Yes	48	1685	765	298	622	5989	5221	2252	38	29	30	26	2661
6	6	AIK (Note: AIK includes seasons competing under the name "AIK IF".)		69	1701	775	271	655	5845	5288	1981	14	25	21	18	2631
7	7	Södertälje SK		74	1683	744	273	666	5885	5315	1934	28	25	6	19	2539
8	10	HV 71	Yes	29	1349	568	279	502	4232	4052	1837	46	45	31	33	2060
9	9	Luleå HF	Yes	29	1349	578	258	513	4267	4018	1807	38	46	35	25	2065
10	8	Leksands IF		54	1522	728	235	559	6076	5184	1804	10	14	14	13	2443
11	11	Skellefteå AIK (Note: Skellefteå AIK includes seasons competing under the names "Skellefteå HC" and "Skellefteå AIK/IF".)	Yes	37	1122	480	186	456	3890	3846	1347	19	21	13	10	1544
12	12	Timrå IK (Note: Timrå IK includes seasons competing under the names "Wifsta/Östrands IF" and "Wifsta/Östrands-Fagerviks IF".)	Yes	35	1103	402	209	492	3298	3528	1315	43	28	23	29	1481
13	15	Linköping HC	Yes	13	685	275	145	265	1839	1845	1018	31	34	17	30	1018
14	13	IF Malmö Redhawks (Note: IF Malmö Redhawks includes seasons competing under the names "Malmö IF", "MIF Redhawks", and "Malmö FF".)	Yes	19	790	287	155	348	2409	2558	901	14	20	29	11	1059
15	14	Västerås IK		35	843	314	110	419	2785	3407	773	3	5	4	1	1059
16	16	IF Björklöven (Note: IF Björklöven includes seasons competing under the names "IFK Umeå" and "Ishockeyföreningen IFK/SSK".)		26	742	284	110	348	2605	2835	707	4	5	4	1	970
17	17	Hammarby IF		42	519	275	61	183	1955	1503	611					886
18	18	Mora IK	Yes	25	513	169	81	263	1688	2017	499	9	13			597
19	19	IK Göta		34	350	175	53	122	1082	933	403					578
20	20	Rögle BK	Yes	10	352	104	60	188	990	1285	319	8	16	2	3	382
21	21	Gävle Godtemplares IK		17	206	111	26	69	870	681	246					359
22	22	IF Karlskoga/Bofors (Note: IF Karlskoga/Bofors includes seasons competing under the names "IFK Bofors" and "KB 63".)		16	231	75	19	137	828	1110	169					244
23	23	Nacka SK		23	225	59	27	139	570	877	145					204
24	27	Växjö Lakers (Note: Växjö Lakers HC includes seasons competing under the name "Östers IF".)	Yes	3	124	32	31	61	261	374	142	2	5	13	10	142
25	24	Karlbergs BK		18	199	59	22	118	476	655	140					199
26	25	Forshaga IF		12	144	58	10	76	587	733	126					184
27	26	Grums IK		11	138	51	12	75	522	628	114					165
28	28	Strömsbro IF		8	119	40	15	64	424	566	95					135
29	29	UoIF Matteuspojkarna		12	143	34	21	88	320	530	89					123
30	30	Tingsryds AIF		7	121	32	11	78	414	629	75					107
31	31	Örebro HK (Note: Örebro HK includes seasons competing under the names "Örebro SK" and "Örebro IK".)	Yes	6	158	25	12	121	445	988	62					87
32	32	Södertälje IF		6	66	20	9	37	103	216	49					69
33	33	Reymersholms IK		5	63	20	7	36	104	163	47					67
34	34	Tranebergs IF		11	105	18	11	76	188	442	47					65
35	35	IK Hermes		6	73	18	10	45	84	195	46					64
36	36	IFK Mariefred		6	67	13	7	47	158	312	33					46
37	37	Surahammars IF		8	91	12	8	71	231	579	32					44
38	38	IFK Stockholm		7	51	9	11	31	97	230	29					38
39	39	Rönnskärs IF		3	49	11	4	34	137	290	26					37
40	41	Atlas Diesels IF		5	50	9	5	36	142	289	23					32
41	42	IF Linnéa		5	27	9	4	14	48	85	22					31
42	40	Nybro IF		2	35	10	2	23	116	174	22					32
43	43	Clemensnäs IF		3	49	7	8	34	146	258	22					29
44	44	Västerås SK		3	30	7	6	17	121	179	20					27

== See also ==
- Marathon SHL standings
