= Raoul Le Mat =

French-American film director (1875–1947)

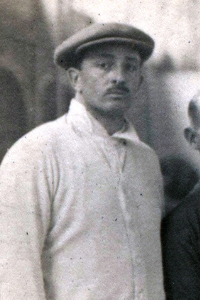
- Raoul Le Mat coaching Team Sweden at the 1920 Olympic ice hockey tournament in Antwerp, Belgium
- Born: September 3, 1875; Paris, France
- Died: February 15, 1947 (aged 71); Panama City, Panama
- Occupations: Film director, ice hockey coach
- Known for: Introducing ice hockey to Sweden

Raoul Le Mat (September 3, 1875 – February 15, 1947) was a French-American film director, and ice hockey coach, most famous for introducing ice hockey in Sweden during the early 1920s.

Together with Ernest Viberg and Thomas Cahill, Le Mat introduced ice hockey in Sweden, and coached the Swedish national team in their first international tournament at the 1920 Summer Olympics in Antwerp, Belgium. He was also the founding member of the Swedish Ice Hockey Association. When the first Swedish Championship in ice hockey was played in 1922, Le Mat refereed the final game.

The Swedish Hockey League's Le Mat Trophy is named after Le Mat and was donated by him, with the monetary support of Metro-Goldwyn-Mayer, in 1926.
