= Daniel Ljunggren =

Swedish ice hockey player

- Born: February 26, 1994 (age 31) Kungsbacka, Sweden
- Height: 5 ft 10 in (178 cm)
- Weight: 181 lb (82 kg; 12 st 13 lb)
- Position: Center
- Shoots: Left
- Allsv team Former teams: Mora IK; Brynäs IF; Leksands IF
- Playing career: 2013–present

Daniel Ljunggren (born February 26, 1994) is a Swedish professional ice hockey player. He is currently under contract to Mora IK of the HockeyAllsvenskan (Allsv).

He made his Elitserien debut playing with Brynäs IF during the 2012–13 Elitserien season.
