= 1946–47 Swedish Division I season =

Swedish ice hockey season

The 1946–47 Swedish Division I season was the third season of Swedish Division I. Hammarby IF defeated Sodertalje SK in the league final, 2 games to none.

== Regular season ==
=== Northern Group ===
	Team	GP	W	T	L	+/-	P
1	Södertälje SK	10	8	0	2	68–20	16
2	AIK	10	7	0	3	73–33	14
3	UoIF Matteuspojkarna	10	7	0	3	49–30	14
4	Mora IK	10	6	0	4	47–52	12
5	Karlbergs BK	10	1	0	9	19–55	2
6	Åkers IF	10	1	0	9	22–88	2

=== Southern Group ===
	Team	GP	W	T	L	+/-	P
1	Hammarby IF	10	7	3	0	61–16	17
2	Västerås IK	10	7	1	2	49–40	15
3	Nacka SK	10	6	0	4	47–34	12
4	IK Göta	10	5	1	4	44–38	11
5	Forshaga IF	10	1	1	8	36–66	3
6	IFK Mariefred	10	1	0	9	23–66	2

== Final ==
- Hammarby IF – Södertälje SK 7–4, 4–2
