= 1951 Swedish Ice Hockey Championship =

The 1951 Swedish Ice Hockey Championship was the 28th season of the Swedish Ice Hockey Championship, the national championship of Sweden. Hammarby IF won the championship. This was the last season of the championship. It was also scheduled for 1952, but it was cancelled.

== Tournament ==
=== Second round ===
- VIK Västerås HK - Hammarby IF 3:5

=== Quarterfinals ===
- Forshaga IF - Hammarby IF 1:2
- Tranebergs IF - Gävle GIK 3:1
- AIK - Sundbyberg 7:3

=== Semifinals ===
- Hammarby IF - Tranebergs IF 3:1
- Södertälje SK - AIK 7:3

=== Final ===
- Hammarby IF - Södertälje SK 3:2
