= 1924 Swedish Ice Hockey Championship =

The 1924 Swedish Ice Hockey Championship was the third season of the Swedish Ice Hockey Championship, the national championship of Sweden. IK Gota won the championship.

== Tournament ==
Quarterfinals; 26–27 February
IK Göta	3
Hammarby IF	2
IF Sankt Erik	1
Tranebergs IF	0
Djurgårdens IF	7
IF Linnéa	0
IFK Stockholm	8
Nacka SK	1

Semifinals; 28–29 February
IK Göta	6
IF Sankt Erik	1
Djurgårdens IF	8
IFK Stockholm	6

Finals; 5 March
1st place, gold medalist(s)	IK Göta	3
2nd place, silver medalist(s)	Djurgårdens IF	0
