= 1946–47 Division 2 season (Swedish ice hockey) =

- League: (Sweden) Division 2
- Sport: Ice hockey
- Teams: 43
- Group winners: Gävle GIK (North); Leksands IF (Dalarna); IFK Bofors (West); Västerås SK HK (Västmanland); Tranebergs IF (Södermanland); Atlas Diesels IF (East); Djurgårdens IF (South)
- Promoted to Division 1: Gävle GIK; Västerås SK; Tranebergs IF; Atlas Diesels IF

2nd tier Division 2 seasons
- ← 1945–46 1947–48 →

The 1946–47 Division 2 season was the second tier of ice hockey in Sweden for that season. 43 teams participated, divided into six groups of six and one group of seven. Group winners Gävle GIK, Leksands IF, IFK Bofors, Västerås SK, Tranebergs IF, Atlas Diesels IF, and Djurgårdens IF advanced to a promotion tournament which resulted in Gävle GIK, Västerås, Traneberg, and Atlas Diesel being promoted to Division 1 for the following season.

== Standings ==
=== North ===
Pos	Team	Pld	W	D	L	GF	GA	GD	Pts	Promotion or relegation
1	Gävle GIK (P)	12	10	0	2	58	30	+28	20	Advance to promotion qualifiers
2	Brynäs IF	12	7	0	5	56	47	+9	14	
3	IK Huge	12	7	0	5	58	57	+1	14	
4	Gefle IF	12	6	1	5	50	47	+3	13	
5	IK Warpen	12	5	0	7	43	35	+8	10	
6	Sandvikens IF	12	4	0	8	44	60	−16	8	
7	Strömsbro IF	12	2	1	9	39	72	−33	5	

(P) Promoted

=== Dalarna ===
Pos	Team	Pld	W	D	L	GF	GA	GD	Pts	
1	Leksands IF	10	9	0	1	83	23	+60	18	Advance to promotion qualifiers
2	IFK Rättvik	10	6	0	4	64	47	+17	12	
3	IK Brage	10	6	0	4	40	43	−3	12	
4	Hofors IK	10	4	1	5	54	50	+4	9	
5	Krylbo IF	10	4	1	5	23	33	−10	9	
6	Falu BS (R)	10	0	0	10	13	81	−68	0	Relegated

(R) Relegated

=== West ===
Pos	Team	Pld	W	D	L	GF	GA	GD	Pts	Promotion or relegation
1	IFK Bofors	10	10	0	0	70	12	+58	20	Advance to promotion qualifiers
2	IF Göta	9	5	1	3	42	29	+13	11	
3	Deje IK	10	4	1	5	28	34	−6	9	
4	Färjestads BK (R)	10	3	1	6	40	55	−15	7	Relegated
5	Degerfors BK (R)	10	3	0	7	33	49	−16	6	Relegated
6	Grums IK (R)	8	2	1	5	29	63	−34	5	Relegated

(R) Relegated

=== Västmanland ===
Pos	Team	Pld	W	D	L	GF	GA	GD	Pts	Promotion or relegation
1	Västerås SK (P)	10	9	1	0	95	15	+80	19	Advance to promotion qualifiers
2	Surahammars IF	10	8	1	1	80	18	+62	17	
3	BK Forward	10	5	0	5	43	49	−6	10	
4	IK Westmannia	10	4	0	6	32	39	−7	8	
5	IFK Västerås	10	3	0	7	34	53	−19	6	
6	IF Eyra (R)	10	0	0	10	9	115	−106	0	Relegated

(P) Promoted; (R) Relegated

=== Södermanland ===
Pos	Team	Pld	W	D	L	GF	GA	GD	Pts	Promotion or relegation
1	Tranebergs IF (P)	10	8	1	1	82	27	+55	17	Advance to promotion qualifiers
2	Södertälje IF	10	8	0	2	74	31	+43	16	
3	IF Olympia	10	5	1	4	35	40	−5	11	
4	Lilljanshofs IF	10	5	0	5	37	49	−12	10	
5	Värtans IK (R)	10	2	1	7	43	62	−19	5	Relegated
6	IFK Tumba (R)	10	0	1	9	26	88	−62	1	Relegated

(P) Promoted; (R) Relegated

=== East ===
Pos	Team	Pld	W	D	L	GF	GA	GD	Pts	Promotion or relegation
1	Atlas Diesels IF (P)	10	8	1	1	85	19	+66	17	Advance to promotion qualifiers
2	Årsta SK	10	7	0	3	49	45	+4	14	
3	IFK Stockholm	10	5	1	4	46	44	+2	11	
4	IK Sirius	10	4	0	6	41	55	−14	8	
5	Kungsholms IF (R)	10	4	0	6	51	71	−20	8	Relegated
6	Reymersholms IK (R)	10	1	0	9	52	72	−20	2	Relegated

(P) Promoted; (R) Relegated

=== South ===
Pos	Team	Pld	W	D	L	GF	GA	GD	Pts	Promotion or relegation
1	Djurgårdens IF	10	9	0	1	86	20	+66	18	Advance to promotion qualifiers
2	IK Sleipner	10	9	0	1	62	23	+39	18	
3	IFK Norrköping	10	6	0	4	61	38	+23	12	
4	Norrköpings AIS	10	4	0	6	46	52	−6	8	
5	GoIF Tjalve (R)	10	2	0	8	27	84	−57	4	Relegated
6	BK Derby (R)	10	0	0	10	14	79	−65	0	Relegated

(R) Relegated
