= 1930 Swedish Ice Hockey Championship =

The 1930 Swedish Ice Hockey Championship was the ninth season of the Swedish Ice Hockey Championship, the national championship of Sweden. IK Gota won the championship.

== Tournament ==
=== Qualification ===
- UoIF Matteuspojkarna - IK Hermes 4:0

=== Quarterfinal ===
- Södertälje SK - Nacka SK 2:0
- AIK - Karlbergs BK 7:0
- IK Göta - Hammarby IF 3:0
- Djurgårdens IF - UoIF Matteuspojkarna 3:1

=== Semifinals ===
- Södertälje SK - AIK 2:3
- IK Göta - Djurgårdens IF 3:1

=== Final ===
- AIK - IK Göta 0:2
