= 1938 Swedish Ice Hockey Championship =

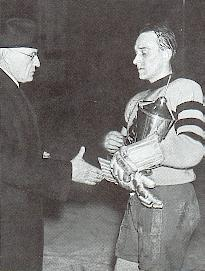
AIK's Axel Nilsson receiving the Le Mat Trophy in 1938

The 1938 Swedish Ice Hockey Championship was the 17th season of the Swedish Ice Hockey Championship, the national championship of Sweden. AIK won the championship.

== Tournament ==
=== Quarterfinals ===
- Södertälje IF - IK Hermes 2:0
- AIK - IFK Mariefred 7:1
- IK Göta - Södertälje SK 2:0
- Hammarby IF - Karlbergs BK 1:0

=== Semifinals ===
- Södertälje IF - AIK 0:4
- IK Göta - Hammarby IF 1:2

=== Final ===
- AIK - Hammarby IF 2:0
