= Marathon SHL standings =

Swedish ice hockey club rankings

The marathon standings for the Swedish Hockey League (SHL) (formerly named Elitserien) is an accumulated table for the Swedish Hockey League, the current top Swedish ice hockey league, since it was inaugurated in the 1975–76 season. The marathon standings, updated by the Swedish Ice Hockey Association (SIHA), presents an overview of the overall regular-season records for all teams who have played at least one season in the SHL. The table is sorted after the highest number of total points.

Färjestad BK are currently leading the table, with 3216 points. Färjestad BK is also the only team to have played in all 48 SHL seasons. Växjö Lakers have the highest point average, with 88.4 points per season, and the highest point percentage (55.5%). Färjestad BK has the highest winning percentage (48.8%). Färjestad BK have qualified for the playoffs 42 times, more than any other team.

== Standings after the 2022–23 season ==
#	Team	Seasons	Cur. SHL	First SHL season	Most recent SHL season	Games played	Points	Point average	Point percentage	Winning percentage	Playoff appearances
1	Färjestad BK	47	Yes	1975–76	2024–25	2129	3216	68.4	50.4%	48.8%	42
2	Frölunda HC	42	Yes	1975–76	2024–25	1905	2757	65.6	48.2%	44%	25
3	Djurgårdens IF	44	Yes	1975–76	2021–22	2001	2731	62.1	45.5%	43.9%	29
4	Brynäs IF	47	Yes	1975–76	2024–25	2129	2656	56.5	41.6%	39.8%	25
5	Luleå HF	38	Yes	1984–85	2024–25	1823	2605	68.6	47.6%	43.1%	29
6	HV71	37	Yes	1979–80	2024–25	1771	2474	66.9	46.6%	41.7%	25
7	Modo Hockey	40		1975–76	2024–25	1781	2169	54.2	40.6%	38.3%	21
8	Skellefteå AIK	30	Yes	1975–76	2024–25	1339	1924	64.1	47.9%	44.5%	17
9	Linköping HC	22	Yes	1999–2000	2024–25	1159	1720	78.2	49.5%	39.2%	10
10	Leksands IF	35	Yes	1975–76	2024–25	1470	1677	47.9	38%	40.1%	16
11	Malmö Redhawks	23	Yes	1990–91	2024–25	1105	1405	61.1	42.4%	37.7%	14
12	AIK	29		1975–76	2013–14	1214	1323	45.6	46.5%	38.2%	13
13	Timrå IK	18	Yes	1975–76	2024–25	897	1084	60.2	40.3%	31.4%	8
14	Södertälje SK	24		1975–76	2010–11	1036	1065	44.4	41.9%	33.9%	8
15	Växjö Lakers	11	Yes	2011–12	2024–25	584	972	88.4	55.5%	43.7%	8
16	Rögle BK	14	Yes	1992–93	2024–25	653	805	57.5	41.1%	34.5%	4
17	Örebro HK	9	Yes	2013–14	2024–25	474	661	73.4	46.5%	34.8%	3
18	IF Björklöven	15		1976–77	2000–01	544	537	35.8	45.2%	39%	7
19	Västerås IK	12		1988–89	1999–2000	498	461	38.4	42.1%	33.9%	5
20	Mora IK	6		2004–05	2018–19	314	382	63.7	40.6%	31.5%	2
21	IK Oskarshamn	3		2019–20	2022–23	156	179	59.7	38.2%	30.8%	1
22	Karlskrona HK	3		2015–16	2017–18	156	146	48.7	31.2%	23.1%	0
23	Örebro IK	2		1976–77	1978–79	72	29	14.5	20.1%	13.9%	0
24	Hammarby IF	2		1982–83	1984–85	72	28	14	19.4%	12.5%	0
25	Väsby IK	1		1987–88	1987–88	22	3	3	6.8%	4.5%	0

=== Notes ===
The "Playoff appearances" column tells exactly how many times a particular team has qualified for the quarterfinals. The "Cur. SHL" column indicates whether the team plays in the SHL as of the end of the 2022–23 season; a green box indicates that the team plays in the 2025–26 SHL season.

Point average is the average number of points per season; that is, the total number of points divided by the number of seasons. Point percentage is the total number of points divided by the total number of possible points. Winning percentage is the percentage of wins, determined by dividing the total number of wins by the total number of games played. Both the point averages, the winning percentages and the point percentages are rounded to one decimal.

Newer SHL teams record higher point averages, due to the fact that the league has only been using the 3-point system (that is, 3 points for a regulation-time win) since the 1998–99 season, as well as the fact that only 36–40 games were played until the 1996–97 season. Since the 1996–97 season, each season consists of at least 50 games (55 games since the 2006–07 season). Before the 1998–99 season, the teams received two points for each win instead of three. Also, from the 1987–88 season until the 1996–97 season, the two worst teams after the first 22 games were relegated to Allsvenskan; the remaining teams played another 18 games. For these reasons, point percentage is a more accurate way of determining each team's overall performance in the regular season. It is possible to get 165 points in one season, due to the 3-point system and the 55-game schedule.

Regarding the winning percentages, note that, due to the former 2-point system, overtime or shootout wins also counted as wins from the 1975–76 season through the 1997–98 season. Since the 1998–99 season, when the 3-point system was introduced, only regulation-time wins count as wins.

== See also ==
- Marathon standings for the top Swedish ice hockey league
- List of SHL seasons
