= 1925 Swedish Ice Hockey Championship =

The 1925 Swedish Ice Hockey Championship was the fourth season of the Swedish Ice Hockey Championship, the national championship of Sweden. Sodertalje SK won the championship.

== Tournament ==
=== First round ===
Both matches held 10 March 1925

- IFK Stockholm 4–2 Djurgårdens IF
- Nacka SK 2–0 IF Sankt Erik

=== Bracket ===
Second round 11 and 13 March
IK Göta	8
Hammarby IF	2
Nacka SK	4
IFK Stockholm	3

Semifinals; 14 March
Västerås SK	8
IK Göta	6
Södertälje SK	7
Nacka SK	0

Finals; 21 March
1st place, gold medalist(s)	Södertälje SK	3
2nd place, silver medalist(s)	Västerås SK	2
