= 1940 Swedish Ice Hockey Championship =

The 1940 Swedish Ice Hockey Championship was the 18th season of the Swedish Ice Hockey Championship, the national championship of Sweden. IK Gota won the championship.

== Tournament ==
=== Qualification ===
- IF Verdandi - Västerås SK 4:3
- IK Westmannia - VIK Västerås HK 3:4
- IFK Västerås - IFK Mariefred 0:7
- Surahammars IF - IF Aros 3:3/1:2
- Djurgårdens IF - Rålambshofs IF 1:2
- IFK Lidingö - Skuru IK 3:2
- IFK Stockholm - Thule IF 4:3
- Liljanshof - Westermalms IF 4:0
- IFK Nyland - GIF Sundsvall 7:0

=== First round ===
- Reymersholms IK - Älsvsjö AIK 6:0
- IK Sirius - Stockholms IF 1:8
- IFK Lidingö - Liljanshofs IF 0:5
- IFK Norrköping - IK Hermes 1:3
- Södertälje IF - Rålambshofs IF 5:2
- IK Sleipner - Tranebergs IF 2:4
- IF Vesta - IFK Stockholm 2:1
- IF Aros - VIK Västerås HK 4:0
- IFK Nyland - UoIF Matteuspojkarna 1:3
- IF Verdandi - Nacka SK 1:7
- IFK Mariefred - IK Sture 3:2

=== Round of 16 ===
- IK Aros - AIK 0:8
- Södertälje SK - IK Hermes 1:2
- Karlbergs BK - Reymersholms IK 4:0
- Nacka SK - UoIF Matteuspojkarna 2:4
- Hammarby IF - Liljanshofs IF 3:0
- Stockholms IF - IFK Mariefred 2:5
- Södertälje IF - Tranebergs IF 2:0
- IF Vesta - IK Göta 0:3

=== Quarterfinals ===
- AIK - IK Hermes 5:2
- Karlbergs BK - UoIF Matteuspojkarna 3:1
- Hammarby IF - IFK Mariefred 7:0
- Södertälje IF - IK Göta 1:3

=== Semifinals ===
- AIK - Karlbergs BK 2:0
- Hammarby IF - IK Göta 1:2

=== Final ===
- AIK - IK Göta 1:4
