= Le Mat Trophy =

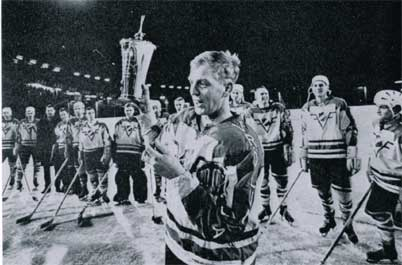
- Västra Frölunda IF's Lars-Eric Lundvall receiving the Le Mat trophy following the 1965 Swedish National Championship playoffs.
- Date: 1926
- Country: Sweden

The Le Mat Trophy (Swedish: Le Mat-pokalen, lit. 'Le Mat Cup') is the trophy awarded to Swedish champions in ice hockey. The trophy has been awarded since the 1926 season and starting with the 1975–76 season – it has been awarded to the winners of the Swedish Hockey League (SHL) playoffs.

The Le Mat is the oldest trophy competed for by professional athletes in Sweden. The trophy was donated by the founding father of ice hockey in Sweden, Raoul Le Mat, and Metro-Goldwyn-Mayer Inc. in 1926. Since then, the silver cup has been modified and now features a lid with two crossed ice hockey sticks and an oak base. The cup is 52 cm (20 in) high and weighs 3.34 kg (7.4 lb).
