= 1949–50 Swedish Division I season =

Swedish ice hockey season

The 1949–50 Swedish Division I season was the sixth season of Swedish Division I. Sodertalje SK defeated Hammarby IF in the league final.

== Regular season ==
=== Northern Group ===
	Team	GP	W	T	L	+/-	P
1	Södertälje SK	10	9	1	0	50–19	19
2	Gävle GIK	10	7	0	3	32–21	14
3	AIK	10	6	0	4	38–26	12
4	IK Huge	10	2	2	6	22–41	6
4	Nacka SK	10	2	1	7	22–40	5
5	UoIF Matteuspojkarna	10	1	2	7	21–38	4

=== Southern Group ===
	Team	GP	W	T	L	+/-	P
1	Hammarby IF	10	7	2	1	56–22	16
2	Djurgårdens IF	10	6	2	2	53–27	14
3	Forshaga IF	10	6	1	3	53–36	13
4	IK Göta	10	5	1	4	41–46	11
5	Västerås SK	10	2	1	7	53–39	5
6	Atlas Diesels IF	10	0	1	9	21–67	1

== Final ==
- Södertälje SK – Hammarby IF 3–2, 3–2 OT
