= 1950–51 Swedish Division I season =

Swedish ice hockey season

The 1950–51 Swedish Division I season was the seventh season of the Swedish Division I. Djurgardens IF defeated AIK in the league final, 2 games to none.

== Regular season ==
=== Northern Group ===
	Team	GP	W	T	L	+/-	P
1	AIK	10	9	1	0	56–19	19
2	Hammarby IF	10	6	1	3	49–23	13
3	Gävle GIK	10	6	1	3	43–25	13
4	Mora IK	10	4	0	6	34–40	8
4	IK Huge	10	2	1	7	28–45	5
5	Tranebergs IF	10	1	0	9	25–83	2

=== Southern Group ===
	Team	GP	W	T	L	+/-	P
1	Djurgårdens IF	10	10	0	0	68–19	20
2	Södertälje SK	10	8	0	2	67–20	16
3	Forshaga IF	10	5	0	5	54–44	10
4	IK Göta	10	4	0	6	27–59	8
5	Västerås IK	10	2	0	8	27–62	4
6	IFK Norrköping	10	1	0	9	21–60	2

== Final ==
- Djurgårdens IF – AIK 10–2, 6–2
