= 1926 Swedish Ice Hockey Championship =

The 1926 Swedish Ice Hockey Championship was the fifth season of the Swedish Ice Hockey Championship, the national championship of Sweden. Djurgardens IF won the championship.

== Tournament ==
=== First round ===
5 February

- Södertälje SK 7–2 AIK

=== Second round ===
8 February

- Djurgårdens IF 5–4 IK Göta
- Södertälje SK 4–3 Hammarby IF
- Nacka SK 3–1 IFK Stockholm

=== Finals bracket ===
Semifinals (10–11 Feb)
Djurgårdens IF	4
Södertälje SK	3
Västerås SK	3
Nacka SK	1

Finals (12 Feb)
1st place, gold medalist(s)	Djurgårdens IF	7
2nd place, silver medalist(s)	Västerås SK	1
3rd place match (14 Feb)
3rd place, bronze medalist(s)	Södertälje SK	8
4	Nacka SK	1
