= 1954–55 Swedish Division I season =

Swedish ice hockey season

The 1954–55 Swedish Division I season was the eleventh season of Swedish Division I. Djurgardens IF defeated Hammarby IF in the league final, 2 games to none.

== Regular season ==
=== Northern Group ===
	Team	GP	W	T	L	+/-	P
1	Hammarby IF	10	6	1	3	40–23	13
2	Gävle GIK	10	5	2	3	42–28	12
3	Leksands IF	10	5	1	4	48–36	11
4	IK Göta	10	5	1	4	40–39	11
5	Brynäs IF	10	5	0	5	25–46	10
6	AIK	10	1	1	8	24–27	3

=== Southern Group ===
	Team	GP	W	T	L	+/-	P
1	Djurgårdens IF	10	10	0	0	83–16	20
2	Södertälje SK	10	8	0	2	67–37	16
3	Grums IK	10	4	1	5	41–39	9
4	IFK Bofors	10	3	2	5	41–40	8
5	Västerås IK	10	3	0	7	38–60	6
6	IFK Stockholm	10	0	1	9	27–105	1

== Final ==
- Djurgårdens IF – Hammarby IF 6–3, 11–2
