= 1955–56 Swedish Division I season =

Swedish ice hockey season

The 1955–56 Swedish Division I season was the twelfth season of Swedish Division I. Södertälje SK won the league title by finishing first in the Swedish championship series.

== Division I North ==
	Team	GP	W	T	L	+/-	P
1	Leksands IF	10	8	0	2	51–31	10
2	Hammarby IF	10	5	2	3	32–28	12
3	Skellefteå AIK	10	3	4	3	32–28	10
4	Gävle GIK	10	3	4	3	29–25	10
5	IK Göta	10	3	3	4	31–30	9
6	Surahammars IF	10	1	1	8	22–55	3

== Division I South ==
	Team	GP	W	T	L	+/-	P
1	Djurgårdens IF	10	9	0	1	65–14	18
2	Södertälje SK	10	8	1	1	51–23	17
3	Grums IK	10	6	1	3	53–33	13
4	IFK Bofors	10	3	0	7	40–39	6
5	UoIF Matteuspojkarna	10	3	0	7	21–45	6
6	IFK Norrköping	10	0	0	10	14–90	0

== Swedish championship series ==
	Team	GP	W	T	L	+/-	P
1	Södertälje SK	6	6	0	0	28–14	12
2	Djurgårdens IF	6	4	0	2	25–18	8
3	Leksands IF	6	2	0	4	26–27	4
4	IFK Bofors	6	0	0	6	12–32	0
