= 1957–58 Swedish Division I season =

Swedish ice hockey season

The 1957–58 Swedish Division I season was the 14th season of Swedish Division I. Djurgårdens IF won the league title by finishing first in the Swedish championship series.

== Division I North ==
	Team	GP	W	T	L	+/-	P
1	Skellefteå AIK	14	12	1	1	80–24	25
2	Gävle GIK	14	12	0	2	95–40	24
3	Leksands IF	14	10	1	3	68–42	21
4	Wifsta/Östrands IF	14	7	2	5	59–53	16
5	Mora IK	14	4	2	8	57–76	10
6	Strömsbro IF	14	3	1	10	39–76	7
7	Rönnskärs IF	14	2	1	11	39–96	5
8	IK Göta	14	2	0	12	39–69	4

== Division I South ==
	Team	GP	W	T	L	+/-	P
1	Djurgårdens IF	14	11	1	2	79–22	23
2	Södertälje SK	14	11	0	3	94–36	22
3	Forshaga IF	14	9	0	5	63–55	18
4	IFK Bofors	14	8	0	6	59–56	16
5	Grums IK	14	6	1	7	52–59	13
6	Västerås IK	14	3	1	10	46–70	7
7	UoIF Matteuspojkarna	14	3	1	10	37–82	7
8	GAIS	14	3	0	11	43–103	6

== Swedish championship series ==
	Team	GP	W	T	L	+/-	P
1	Djurgårdens IF	6	4	0	2	24–15	8
2	Skellefteå AIK	6	3	1	2	19–18	7
3	Södertälje SK	6	3	0	3	23–18	6
4	Gävle GIK	6	1	1	4	17–25	3
