= 1948–49 Swedish Division I season =

Swedish ice hockey season

The 1948–49 Swedish Division I season was the fifth season of Swedish Division I. Hammarby IF defeated Gavle GIK in the league final.

== Regular season ==
=== Northern Group ===
	Team	GP	W	T	L	+/-	P
1	Gävle GIK	10	6	4	0	34–23	16
2	Södertälje SK	10	6	2	2	42–23	14
3	AIK	10	3	4	3	35–27	10
4	UoIF Matteuspojkarna	10	3	2	5	29–43	8
4	Leksands IF	10	3	1	6	34–44	7
5	Mora IK	10	2	1	7	18–32	5

=== Southern Group ===
	Team	GP	W	T	L	+/-	P
1	Hammarby IF	10	9	0	1	67–27	18
2	Djurgårdens IF	10	7	1	2	55–26	15
3	Forshaga IF	10	4	2	4	34–33	10
4	IK Göta	10	4	0	6	35–40	8
5	Västerås IK	10	2	0	8	26–60	4
6	Surahammars IF	10	1	0	9	21–52	2

== Final ==
- Gävle GIK – Hammarby IF 4–2, 0–3, (1–3 after OT)
