= 1970–71 Swedish Division I season =

Swedish ice hockey season

The 1970–71 Swedish Division I season was the 27th season of Swedish Division I. Brynas IF won the league title by finishing first in the final round.

== First round ==
=== Northern Group ===
| | Team | GP | W | T | L | +/- | P |
|---|---|---|---|---|---|---|---|
| 1 | Brynäs IF | 14 | 13 | 0 | 1 | 128–39 | 26 |
| 2 | Södertälje SK | 14 | 8 | 3 | 3 | 62–48 | 19 |
| 3 | MoDo AIK | 14 | 8 | 2 | 4 | 68–46 | 18 |
| 4 | Timrå IK | 14 | 7 | 3 | 4 | 54–55 | 17 |
| 5 | Djurgårdens IF | 14 | 6 | 3 | 5 | 54–49 | 15 |
| 6 | IFK/SSK, Umeå | 14 | 3 | 1 | 10 | 55–79 | 7 |
| 7 | Skellefteå AIK | 14 | 2 | 1 | 11 | 48–98 | 5 |
| 8 | Heffners/Ortvikens IF | 14 | 2 | 1 | 11 | 36–91 | 5 |

=== Southern Group ===
| | Team | GP | W | T | L | +/- | P |
|---|---|---|---|---|---|---|---|
| 1 | AIK | 14 | 10 | 2 | 2 | 68–22 | 22 |
| 2 | Leksands IF | 14 | 8 | 3 | 3 | 79–38 | 19 |
| 3 | Färjestads BK | 14 | 9 | 1 | 4 | 67–41 | 19 |
| 4 | Västra Frölunda IF | 14 | 9 | 1 | 4 | 71–48 | 17 |
| 5 | Västerås IK | 14 | 7 | 0 | 7 | 42–54 | 14 |
| 6 | Tingsryds AIF | 14 | 5 | 2 | 7 | 52–67 | 12 |
| 7 | Mora IK | 14 | 2 | 1 | 11 | 48–73 | 5 |
| 8 | Fagersta AIK | 14 | 1 | 0 | 13 | 34–100 | 2 |

== Qualification round ==
=== Northern Group ===
| | Team | GP | W | T | L | +/- | P |
|---|---|---|---|---|---|---|---|
| 1 | Djurgårdens IF | 6 | 5 | 0 | 1 | 27–12 | 10 |
| 2 | IFK/SSK, Umeå | 6 | 4 | 0 | 2 | 28–16 | 8 |
| 3 | Heffners/Ortvikens IF | 6 | 3 | 0 | 3 | 21–21 | 6 |
| 4 | Skellefteå AIK | 6 | 0 | 0 | 6 | 11–28 | 0 |

=== Southern Group ===
| | Team | GP | W | T | L | +/- | P |
|---|---|---|---|---|---|---|---|
| 1 | Mora IK | 6 | 4 | 1 | 1 | 31–14 | 9 |
| 2 | Tingsryds AIF | 6 | 4 | 0 | 2 | 28–14 | 8 |
| 3 | Västerås IK | 6 | 2 | 2 | 2 | 21–20 | 6 |
| 4 | Fagersta AIK | 6 | 0 | 1 | 5 | 15–47 | 1 |

== Final round ==
| | Team | GP | W | T | L | +/- | P |
|---|---|---|---|---|---|---|---|
| 1 | Brynäs IF | 14 | 12 | 0 | 2 | 83–49 | 24 |
| 2 | Leksands IF | 14 | 9 | 2 | 3 | 71–49 | 20 |
| 3 | Färjestads BK | 14 | 6 | 3 | 5 | 59–52 | 15 |
| 4 | MoDo AIK | 14 | 6 | 3 | 5 | 53–56 | 15 |
| 5 | Timrå IK | 14 | 4 | 3 | 7 | 51–67 | 11 |
| 6 | AIK | 14 | 5 | 0 | 9 | 39–41 | 10 |
| 7 | Södertälje SK | 14 | 4 | 2 | 8 | 50–65 | 10 |
| 8 | Västra Frölunda IF | 14 | 3 | 1 | 10 | 38–66 | 7 |
