= 1969–70 Swedish Division I season =

Swedish ice hockey season

The 1969–70 Swedish Division I season was the 26th season of Swedish Division I. Brynas IF won the league title by finishing first in the final round.

== First round ==
=== Northern Group ===
	Team	GP	W	T	L	+/-	P
1	Brynäs IF	14	12	1	1	94–34	25
2	MoDo AIK	14	10	2	2	78–41	22
3	Södertälje SK	14	8	3	3	70–49	19
4	IFK Umeå	14	6	3	5	58–53	15
5	Timrå IK	14	6	0	8	64–64	12
6	Clemensnäs IF	14	4	1	9	53–75	9
7	Djurgårdens IF	14	3	1	10	46–79	7
8	Sandåkerns SK	14	1	1	12	31–99	3

=== Southern Group ===
	Team	GP	W	T	L	+/-	P
1	AIK	14	10	0	4	61–37	20
2	Leksands IF	14	8	1	5	68–42	17
3	Mora IK	14	8	1	5	68–49	17
4	Västra Frölunda IF	14	8	1	5	57–46	17
5	Tingsryds AIF	14	8	0	6	46–50	16
6	Västerås IK	14	7	1	6	48–41	15
7	Nybro IF	14	4	0	10	45–60	8
8	Surahammars IF	14	1	0	13	27–95	2

== Qualification round ==
=== Northern Group ===
	Team	GP	W	T	L	+/-	P
1	Timrå IK	6	3	2	1	31–22	8
2	Djurgårdens IF	6	2	3	1	31–22	7
3	Clemensnäs IF	6	3	0	3	26–23	6
4	Sandåkerns SK	6	1	1	4	17–38	3

=== Southern Group ===
	Team	GP	W	T	L	+/-	P
1	Tingsryds AIF	6	5	1	0	43–23	11
2	Västerås IK	6	3	2	1	37–20	8
3	Nybro IF	6	2	1	3	26–27	5
4	Surahammars IF	6	0	0	6	11–47	0

== Final round ==
	Team	GP	W	T	L	+/-	P
1	Brynäs IF	14	12	0	2	77–24	24
2	Västra Frölunda IF	14	8	2	4	62–39	18
3	MoDo AIK	14	8	0	6	58–42	16
4	Leksands IF	14	7	0	7	58–50	14
5	AIK	14	6	1	7	41–47	13
6	Södertälje SK	14	6	1	7	44–74	13
7	Mora IK	14	4	0	10	37–65	8
8	IFK Umeå	14	2	2	10	50–86	6
