= 1967–68 Swedish Division I season =

Swedish ice hockey season

The 1967–68 Swedish Division I season was the 24th season of Swedish Division I. Brynas IF won the league title by finishing first in the final round.

== First round ==
=== Northern Group ===
	Team	GP	W	T	L	+/-	P
1	Leksands IF	21	17	1	3	129–48	35
2	AIK	21	15	4	2	79–49	34
3	Mora IK	21	12	3	6	86–64	27
4	MoDo AIK	21	10	1	10	65–62	21
5	IFK Umeå	21	6	6	9	72–86	18
6	Timrå IK	21	5	4	12	61–77	14
7	Tegs SK	21	4	2	15	54–111	10
8	Strömsbro IF	21	3	3	15	63–112	9

=== Southern Group ===
	Team	GP	W	T	L	+/-	P
1	Brynäs IF	21	16	1	4	130–75	33
2	Södertälje SK	21	14	3	4	119–75	31
3	Djurgårdens IF	21	11	3	7	97–83	25
4	Västra Frölunda IF	21	10	4	7	91–58	24
5	Rögle BK	21	9	2	10	92–91	20
6	Västerås IK	21	9	2	10	60–101	20
7	Färjestads BK	21	4	3	14	80–116	11
8	Tingsryds AIF	21	1	2	18	58–128	4

== Final round ==
	Team	GP	W	T	L	+/-	P
1	Brynäs IF	7	6	1	0	41–12	13
2	AIK	7	5	1	1	23–13	11
3	Västra Frölunda IF	7	3	1	3	22–23	7
4	Djurgårdens IF	7	3	0	4	29–28	6
5	Södertälje SK	7	2	2	3	16–27	6
6	Leksands IF	7	2	1	4	23–27	5
7	Mora IK	7	5	0	9	51–69	5
8	MoDo AIK	7	1	1	5	20–34	3
