= 1922 Swedish Ice Hockey Championship =

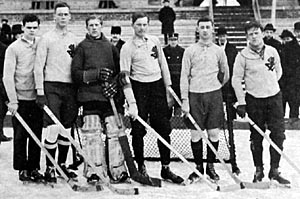
IK Göta won the 1922 Swedish Ice Hockey Championship.

The 1922 Swedish Ice Hockey Championship (Swedish: Svenska Mästerskapet) was the first ever tournament to determine a Swedish champion in ice hockey. The tournament was held over three days (Friday to Sunday), with three-rounds, and eight participating teams. IK Göta won the finals against Hammarby IF by a score of 6–0, to become the inaugural Swedish champions in ice hockey.

== Tournament ==
Quarterfinals; 10–11 March 1922
Hammarby IF	8
Lidingö IF	0
IK Göta	7
IF Linnéa	0
Djurgårdens IF	4
AIK	2
Nacka SK	3
IFK Stockholm	0

Semifinals; 12 March 1922
IK Göta	4
Nacka SK	1
Hammarby IF	4
Djurgårdens IF	1

Finals; 12 March 1922
IK Göta	6
Hammarby IF	0

=== External links ===
- Season on hockeyarchives.info
- Seriespelet 1921/22 on svenskhockey.com
