= Hockeyettan =

Third level of Swedish men's ice hockey

- Formerly: Division I (1944–2014); Division 1 (1999–2014)
- Sport: Ice hockey
- Founded: 1944
- No. of teams: 40 in 4 groups
- Country: Sweden
- Promotion to: HockeyAllsvenskan
- Relegation to: Hockeytvåan
- Website: hockeyettan.com

Hockeyettan is the third tier of ice hockey in Sweden. As of the 2015–16 season, the league consists of 39 teams divided geographically into four groups. Hockeyettan operates a system of promotion and relegation with HockeyAllsvenskan and Division 2.

From 1944 to 1975, Division I was the highest league in the Swedish ice hockey system, but with the creation of Elitserien (now the SHL) in 1975, it became the second tier. Division I was further relegated to third-tier status in 1999 as HockeyAllsvenskan was spun off into a standalone league, but was frequently written as "Division 1" on the Internet, as it was pronounced "Division One". The league was renamed Hockeyettan for the 2014–15 season.

Hockeyettan is the lowest tier to be organized by the Swedish Ice Hockey Association; all men's tiers below Hockeyettan are organized regionally.

== Format ==
As of the 2022–23 season, the league consists of 39 teams divided into four groups of 12 geographically. The clubs meet each other twice, home and away, after which the top four teams from each group form two new groups of eight. Each of these Allettan groups then plays an additional home-and-away series. Meanwhile, the remaining eight teams in each starting group play each other again in a continuation series.

=== Post-season ===
The winner of each Allettan group qualifies directly for the 2023 HockeyAllsvenskan qualifiers. Teams 2–5 in the Allettan groups, along with teams 1–2 from the continuation groups, play a playoff to fill the remaining two spots in the HockeyAllsvenskan qualifiers. Teams 7–8 from the continuation groups are forced to requalify for Hockeyettan against teams from Division 2.

== Participating teams ==
| Hockeyettan North | Hockeyettan South | Hockeyettan West | Hockeyettan East |
|---|---|---|---|
| Bodens HF; Clemensnäs HC; Hudiksvalls HC; IF Sundsvall Hockey; Kalix HC; Kiruna IF; Piteå HC; Strömsbro IF; Vännäs HC; Örnsköldsvik Hockey | Alvesta HK; Borås HC; Halmstad Hammers HC; IF Troja-Ljungby; Karlskrona HK; KRIF Hockey; Kristianstads IK; Mörrums GoIS IK; Tyringe SoSS; Vimmerby HC | Borlänge HF; Falu IF; Forshaga IF; HC Dalen; Lindlövens IF; Mariestad BoIS HC; Mjölby HC; Skövde IK; Surahammars IF; Tranås AIF | Väsby IK HK; Enköpings SK HK; Eskiltuna Linden Hockey; Hanvikens SK; Huddinge IK; Nyköpings SK; Segeltorps IF; IF Vallentuna BK; Visby/Roma HK; Wings HC Arlanda |

== History ==
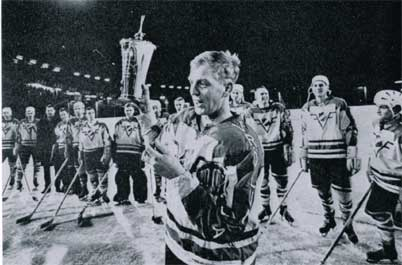
Västra Frölunda IF's Lars Erik Lundvall receiving the Le Mat Trophy in 1965.

Swedish Champions during the Division 1 era
| Season | Winners | Runners-up |
|---|---|---|
| 1945 | Hammarby IF | Södertälje SK |
| 1946 | Hammarby IF | Södertälje SK |
| 1947 | Hammarby IF | Södertälje SK |
| 1948 | Södertälje SK | Hammarby IF |
| 1949 | Hammarby IF | Gävle GIK |
| 1950 | Södertälje SK | Hammarby IF |
| 1951 | Djurgårdens IF | AIK |
| 1952 | Södertälje SK | Gävle GIK |
| 1953 | Södertälje SK | Hammarby IF |
| 1954 | Djurgårdens IF | Gävle Godtemplares IK |
| 1955 | Djurgårdens IF | Hammarby IF |
| 1956 | Södertälje SK | Djurgårdens IF |
| 1957 | Gävle Godtemplares IK | Djurgårdens IF |
| 1958 | Djurgårdens IF | Skellefteå AIK |
| 1959 | Djurgårdens IF | Leksands IF |
| 1960 | Djurgårdens IF | Södertälje SK |
| 1961 | Djurgårdens IF | Skellefteå AIK |
| 1962 | Djurgårdens IF | Västra Frölunda IF |
| 1963 | Djurgårdens IF | Skellefteå AIK |
| 1964 | Brynäs IF | Leksands IF |
| 1965 | Västra Frölunda IF | Brynäs IF |
| 1966 | Brynäs IF | Västra Frölunda IF |
| 1967 | Brynäs IF | Västra Frölunda IF |
| 1968 | Brynäs IF | AIK |
| 1969 | Leksands IF | Brynäs IF |
| 1970 | Brynäs IF | Västra Frölunda IF |
| 1971 | Brynäs IF | Leksands IF |
| 1972 | Brynäs IF | Leksands IF |
| 1973 | Leksands IF | Södertälje SK |
| 1974 | Leksands IF | Timrå IK |
| 1975 | Leksands IF | Brynäs IF |

Division 1 was founded in 1944, replacing Svenska Serien as the top flight of Swedish ice hockey. From its foundation until the 1954–55 season, the league consisted of twelve teams, with group winners facing off in a best-of-three final, and with two teams from the bottom of each group being relegated. From the 1955–56 season, the best-of-three series was replaced with a double round-robin final round with the top two teams from each group. The league was expanded to two groups of eight for the 1956–57 season. The league would continue to have two groups of eight under a variety of different post-season formats until the 1974–75 season. With Elitserien, a new top flight of Swedish hockey to begin play the following year, this final Division 1 season was played in a single group of 16, with the top eight teams going on to play in the new Elitserien, teams 9 and 10 playing (and winning) a northern and a southern qualifier, respectively, of four teams each, and the bottom six remaining in Division 1 in its new status as Sweden's second-tier league.

Division 1 was a much broader league as the second tier, consisting of 49 teams in its inaugural season, eventually being reduced to ca. 40, and then 32 during its final second-tier season in 1998–99. During this entire period, the league was divided into four geographical groups, and operated a system of promotion and relegation with Elitserien and Division 2. Starting in the 1982–83 season, the top teams from each group formed a new group in the spring called Allsvenskan. For the 1999–2000 season, Allsvenskan was spun off into a new second-tier league, resulting in Division 1 becoming the third tier of Swedish hockey.

Division 1's relegation to third-tier status resulted in a massive expansion in the number of teams. 78 teams participated in the 1999–2000 season, though this was reduced over the following seasons. Initially, the league was divided into four regions, all of which were further divided into two groups. By the 2004–05 season, Division 1 had been cut all the way down to 48 teams that were organized into four groups. The league expanded again to 54 teams the following season, and would be numbered in the fifties until 2014.

In 2014, the league was rebranded Hockeyettan, and trimmed down to 48 teams competing in the current format with four starting groups of twelve that are then reorganized into 6 groups of eight in the spring. For the first season under this format, the Hockey Association decided to have only 11 teams in Hockeyettan North, giving a total of 47 teams.

== Notes ==
^aThere has been an ice hockey league named Division 1 in Sweden since 1944 when it was the name of the top flight of Swedish hockey. In 1975 with the creation of Elitserien (now the SHL), Division 1 became the second tier. In 1999 with the creation of an independent second-tier Allsvenskan, it became the third tier.

== See also ==
- List of ice hockey leagues in Sweden
- Ice hockey in Sweden
