= Swedish Hockey League =

Professional ice hockey league

- Current season, competition or edition: 2026–27 SHL season
- Formerly: Elitserien (1975–2013)
- Sport: Ice hockey
- Founded: 1975
- First season: 1975–76
- President: Jenny Silfverstrand
- No. of teams: 14
- Country: Sweden
- Most recent champions: Skellefteå AIK (5th title)
- Most titles: Färjestad BK (10th title)
- Broadcasters: Sweden: TV4 Group; Finland: C More Entertainment
- Relegation to: HockeyAllsvenskan
- International cup: Champions Hockey League
- Related competitions: Swedish Women's Hockey League
- Website: www.shl.se

The Swedish Hockey League (SHL; Swedish: Svenska Hockeyligan) is a professional ice hockey league in Sweden and the highest level of the Swedish ice hockey system. The league currently consists of 14 teams. The league was founded in 1975, and while Swedish ice hockey champions have been crowned through various formats since 1922, the title and the Le Mat Trophy have been awarded to the winner of the SHL playoffs since the league's inaugural 1975–76 season.

The league was founded in 1975 as the Elitserien (known in English as the Swedish Elite League or SEL), and initially featured 10 teams, though this was expanded to 12 for the 1987–88 season. The league was renamed the SHL in 2013, and in 2014, a number of format changes were announced, including an expansion to 14 teams to be finalized prior to the 2015–16 season, and a new format for promotion from and relegation to HockeyAllsvenskan, the second-tier league.

Teams from the SHL participate in the IIHF's annual Champions Hockey League (CHL), competing for the European Trophy. Participation is based on the strength of the various leagues in Europe, which excludes the European/Asian Kontinental Hockey League (KHL). Going into the 2022–23 CHL season, the SHL was ranked the No. 1 league in Europe, allowing them to send their top five teams to compete in the CHL.

In 2025, for the 13th consecutive year, The Hockey Writers ranked the SHL the third strongest professional hockey league in the world, behind the second ranked KHL and the top ranked National Hockey League (NHL).

== History ==
The Swedish Ice Hockey Championship was awarded for the first time in 1922, only two years after ice hockey was introduced in Sweden by the American film director Raoul Le Mat. At this point, the Swedish Championships were held as a separate tournament. It was not until the 1952–53 season that the championship was awarded to the winner of the top-tier hockey league, which at the time was Division I.

=== Expansion ===
The inaugural Elitserien season began on 5 October 1975, with the league consisting of 10 teams, each playing one another four times—two at home and two on the road—for a total of 36 games. There has been extensive discussion about the number of teams in the SHL. The league had 12 teams for over 20 years since an expansion from 10 teams in 1987, however, there was general agreement among hockey experts that the league needed to be expanded by at least two more teams. They meant that, apart from just the economic situation for some of the clubs, the competition from HockeyAllsvenskan had shown that more teams were needed in the top-tier league SHL. On 13 March 2014, the SHL and HockeyAllsvenskan announced that the SHL would be expanded to 14 teams, starting in the 2015–16 season. To make this change happen, at least two HockeyAllsvenskan teams would be promoted to the SHL in the 2014–15 season.

=== European-level play ===
In 2009, Håkan Loob, the general manager of Färjestad BK, sent a letter to Alexander Medvedev, the owner and president of the Russian Kontinental Hockey League, on behalf of five SHL teams – Färjestad, Frölunda, Djurgården, Linköping and HV71 – that were reportedly "interested in discussing the future of European hockey". It was believed that these five teams had intended to leave the SHL league after the 2009–10 season; they terminated their shareholders' agreements with Hockeyligan, the name at that time for the SHL's interest organisation. The teams also formed an interest group to investigate the possibility of forming a continental hockey league spanning several European countries. These plans were abandoned in November 2011, however, with Frölunda's chairman expressing hopes for the future of the European Trophy (which was disbanded with the formation of the Champions Hockey League in 2013).

=== Renaming ===
On 17 June 2013, the league was renamed "Svenska hockeyligan", since this would allow for an easy English translation ("Swedish Hockey League") and a common acronym in the two languages ("SHL"), all of which was considered to be a better brand identity for investment. In 2016, NordicBet became the title sponsor of the league.

== Game ==
Elitserien logo from 2007 until 2013

Each regular season SHL game is composed of three 20-minute periods, with an intermission of a maximum of 18 minutes between periods. If the game is tied following the 60-minute regulation time, a five-minute three-on-three sudden death overtime period is played. If a game still is tied after the overtime period, a shootout decides the game. In a shootout, the team that scores the most penalty shots out of three attempts wins the game. If the game is still tied after the first three penalty-shot rounds, the shootout continues round by round, until one team scores while the other team fails to score.

During each period, there is one 70-second "power break" used to display commercials; each commercial is played after the first stoppage of play at least 10 minutes into the period. Power breaks do not, however, take place directly after a goal, penalty shot, icing call or during a powerplay.

=== Playoff games ===
In the event of a tied game during the playoffs, additional 20-minute overtime periods are played perpetually until one team scores. Unlike in the regular season, playoff overtime periods are played five-on-five. Only one game in Sweden has ever surpassed four full overtime periods, and no SHL games have surpassed three full overtime periods. The longest SHL game was the first game of the 1997 Swedish Championship semifinals, played on 23 March 1997 between Leksands IF and Färjestad BK. 6,012 spectators saw Andreas Karlsson score the game-winning goal for Leksand after 59 minutes of overtime (almost three full overtime periods). See Longest ice hockey games in Sweden for other games.

SHL games are played on an ice hockey rink, which is rectangular ice rink with rounded corners and surrounded by a wall. It measures 30 by 60 meters (98 by 197 ft), conforming to international standards.

== Teams ==
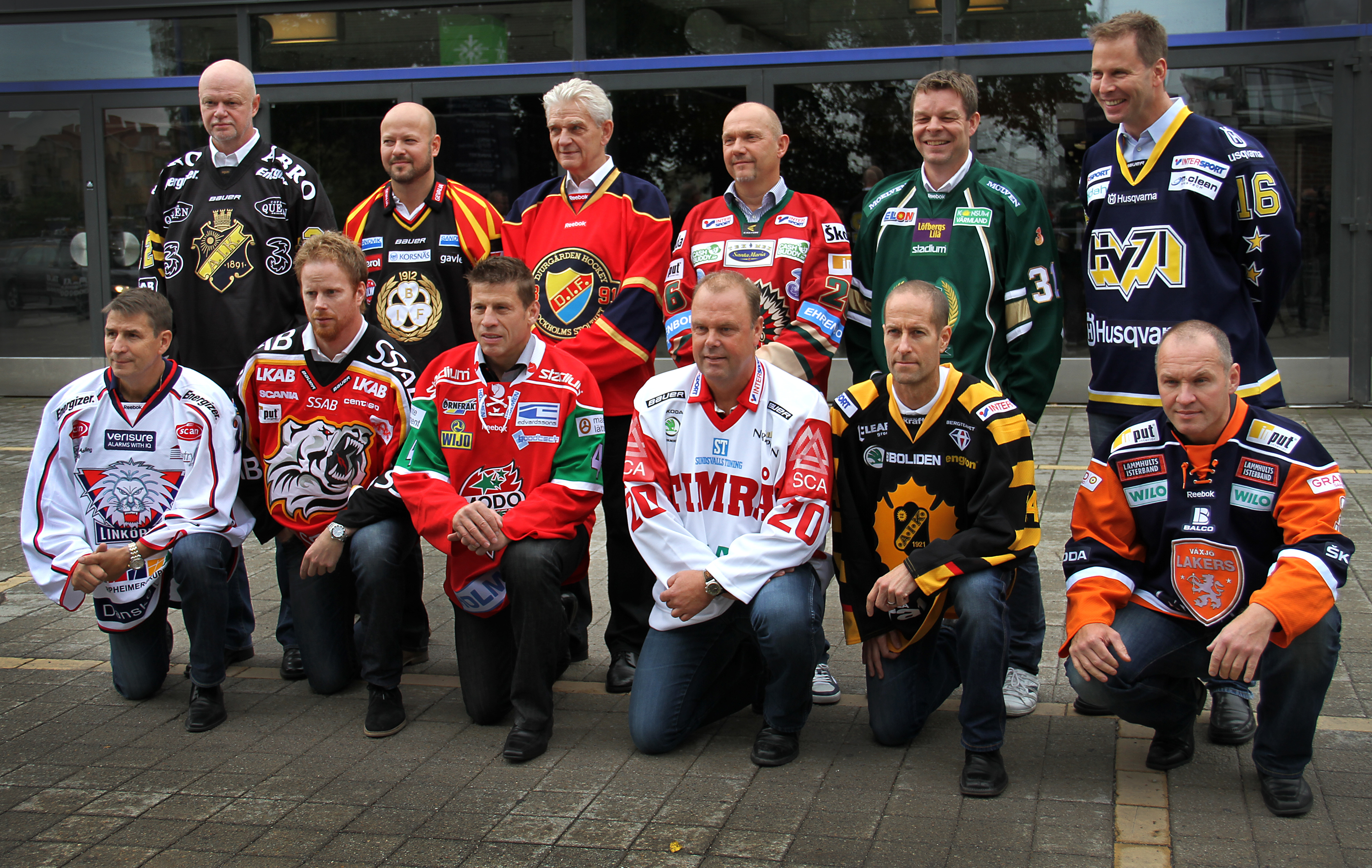
Head coaches, at start of the 2011–12 season

Counting from the formation of the SHL in 1975, Färjestad BK is the most successful team with ten Swedish Championship titles. Brynäs IF and Djurgårdens IF are tied for the second most successful team with six championship titles. Counting from 1922, when the first Swedish championships were played, Djurgårdens IF is the most successful team with sixteen championship titles, followed by Brynäs IF with thirteen, as well as Färjestad BK with ten and IK Göta with nine.

=== 2025–26 season ===
The league consisted of 14 teams; IF Björklöven returned to the SHL after 25 seasons in the HockeyAllsvenskan, where they won the 2025–26 title.

Leksands IF were relegated to the HockeyAllsvenskan at the end of the previous season, after seven seasons in the SHL.

SHL team map

Team	City	Arena	Capacity
Brynäs IF	Gävle	Monitor ERP Arena	7,909
Djurgårdens IF	Stockholm	Hovet	8,094
Färjestad BK	Karlstad	Löfbergs Arena	8,647
Frölunda HC	Gothenburg	Scandinavium	12,044
HV71	Jönköping	Husqvarna Garden	7,000
IF Björklöven	Umeå	Visionite Arena	5,400
Linköping HC	Linköping	Saab Arena	8,500
Luleå HF	Luleå	Coop Norrbotten Arena	6,300
Malmö Redhawks	Malmö	Malmö Arena	13,000
Örebro HK	Örebro	Behrn Arena	5,150
Rögle BK	Ängelholm	Catena Arena	5,150
Skellefteå AIK	Skellefteå	Skellefteå Kraft Arena	6,001
Timrå IK	Timrå	SCA Arena	6,000
Växjö Lakers	Växjö	Vida Arena	5,700

== Season structure ==
The SHL season is divided into a regular season from late September through the beginning of March, when teams play against each other in a pre-defined schedule, and a playoffs from March to April, which is an elimination tournament where two teams play against each other to win a best-of-seven series in order to advance to the next round. The final remaining team is crowned the Swedish champion, or Svenska mästare in Swedish, and receives the Le Mat Trophy.

=== Regular season ===
The regular season is a round-robin, where each team plays 52 games. Points are awarded for each game, where three points are awarded for winning in regulation time, two points for winning in overtime or shootout, one point for losing in overtime or shootout, and zero points for losing in regulation time. At the end of the regular season, the team that finishes with the most points is crowned the league champion and is awarded a prize sum of 1,000,000 SEK (approx. US$150,000) as a bonus. The six highest-ranked teams by points qualify directly for the playoffs. The four teams ranked 7–10 play a best-of-three series and battle for the two remaining playoff spots. The two lowest-ranked teams after the regular season have to play in the relegation and promotion series Kvalserien in order to qualify for the next season of the SHL. Before the 2013–14 season, the eight highest-ranked teams qualified for the playoffs.

If two or more teams end up tied in points, the seeds are determined by the following tiebreaker format:

1. Best goal difference
2. Most goals scored
3. Head-to-head results between the tied teams

=== Playoffs ===
The SHL playoffs are an elimination tournament consisting of multi-game series where two teams battle to win a best-of-three or best-of-seven series in order to advance to the next round. The playoffs consist of four rounds: The eighth finals, the quarterfinals, the semifinals and the finals. In the first round, the eighth finals (known as Play In before the 2015–16 season), the 7th-ranked team from the regular season is paired against the 10th-ranked team and the 8th-ranked team is paired against the 9th-ranked team. In the quarterfinals, the six best teams from the regular season and the two winners of the eighth finals are paired seed-wise against each other, with the highest seed playing the lowest-remaining seed. In the semifinals, the teams are re-seeded, with the top remaining seed playing against the lowest remaining seed, and the other two remaining teams pairing off. In the finals, the two remaining teams face each other to determine the Swedish ice hockey champions. Before the 2013–14 season, the top-tier teams got to choose their opponents in the quarterfinals.

The eighth finals are played as best-of-three series while the other rounds are played as best-of-seven series. In each series, the higher-ranked team of the two has home-ice advantage. Each series is played in an alternating home-away format, with the first game played at the higher seed's home venue. Any given series ends when one team has won more than half the maximum number of games needed to decide the series.

=== Relegation ===
The two lowest ranked teams after the regular season have to play in a best-of-seven relegation series called Kvalserien, with the higher-ranked team having home-ice advantage. The winning team remains in the SHL, while the losing team is relegated to the second-tier league, HockeyAllsvenskan. The champion of HockeyAllsvenskan is promoted to the SHL, taking the place of the relegated team.

== Attendance ==
In the 2010–11 season, the SHL was the world's most evenly matched professional ice hockey league. During the 2011–12 season, the SHL was the most well attended ice hockey league in Europe, averaging 6,385 spectators per game, however in 2013–14, the SHL was third best in Europe, with an attendance average of 5,978. The SHL was the second most popular sports team league within Sweden, after the football league Allsvenskan, which in the 2013 season had an average attendance of 7,627.

Between 2009 and 2013, the league hosted an outdoor game in the regular season in December every year. The first outdoor game was played on 28 December 2009, between Frölunda HC and Färjestad BK at Ullevi. Frölunda came out on top with a 4–1 victory. 31,144 spectators saw the game, setting a new record for the largest attendance at an ice hockey league match in Sweden. The following year, Färjestad and Frölunda met again in an outdoor game, this time in Karlstad. Färjestad won the game 5–2 in front of 15,274 spectators. The 2013 outdoor game was played on 14 December 2013, between Frölunda HC and Skellefteå AIK at Gamla Ullevi. The game was promoted as "Julmatchen" (English: The Christmas game) and was won by Skellefteå 4–1 in front of 13,452 spectators.

== Notable players ==
Three players in SHL history have been awarded the Golden Puck, as ice hockey player of the year in Sweden, more than once; Anders Andersson, Leif Holmqvist and Peter Forsberg have all won it twice.

The top five career scorers in the SHL are Fredrik Bremberg (581 points), Johan Davidsson (561 points), Håkan Loob (500), Stefan Nilsson (489) and Ove Molin (484). The top three career goal scorers are Håkan Loob (263 goals), Magnus Wernblom (241) and Peter Gradin (214). Joel Lundqvist, Jan Sandström and Johan Davidsson are the leaders in the number of SHL regular season games played, with Lundqvist having played 812 games, Sandström 800 and Davidsson 776.

The top three point-scoring forwards for the 2021–22 season were Ryan Lasch (66 points), Max Véronneau (60) and Linus Omark (58). Véronneau was the top goal-scorers and thus the Håkan Loob Trophy winner, with 34 goals. The top three point-scorers on defence were Jonathan Pudas (44 points), Joel Persson (39) and Joey LaLeggia (38). The top three goaltenders by save percentage among those who played more than 40% of their team's minutes were Jhonas Enroth (.923), Christoffer Rifalk (.921) and Gustaf Lindvall (.920).

== Trophies and awards ==
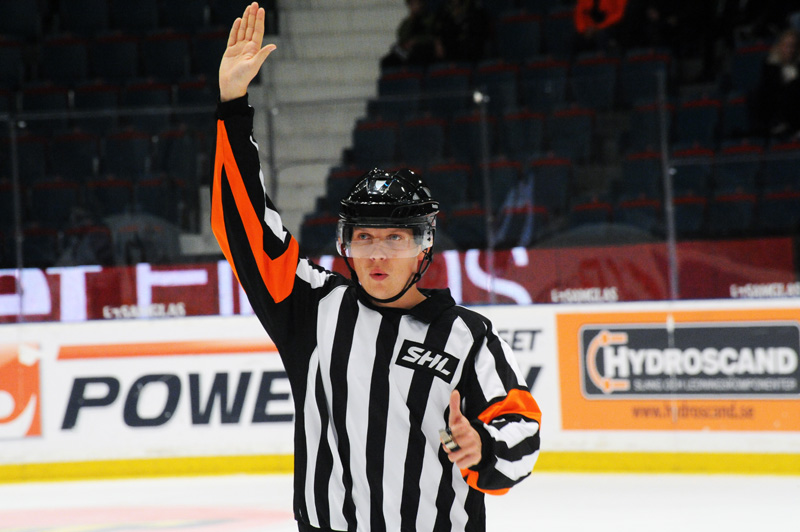
A referee in a SHL-game at Hovet in Stockholm.

The winning team of the SHL playoffs is named Swedish Champions and awarded the Le Mat Trophy. There is only one trophy that is awarded to players based on their statistics during the regular season; the Håkan Loob Trophy for the goal-scoring leader.

One of the most prestigious individual awards is Guldhjälmen, which is awarded annually to the Most Valuable Player. The voting is conducted by the players in the SHL. Guldpucken is awarded annually to the ice hockey player of the year in Sweden. It is not necessarily awarded to a player in the SHL; for the 2005–06 season the award was given to Kenny Jönsson in the Swedish second-tier ice hockey league HockeyAllsvenskan. The award Årets Rookie (Rookie of the Year) is awarded annually by Svenska Spel and Svenska Hockeyligan to the best rookie player in the SHL.

Starting in 2010, an annual playoff MVP was acknowledged. The playoff MVP award was later renamed the Stefan Liv Memorial Trophy in honour of Swedish goalkeeper Stefan Liv after his death in the 2011 Lokomotiv Yaroslavl plane crash.

== Television and radio ==
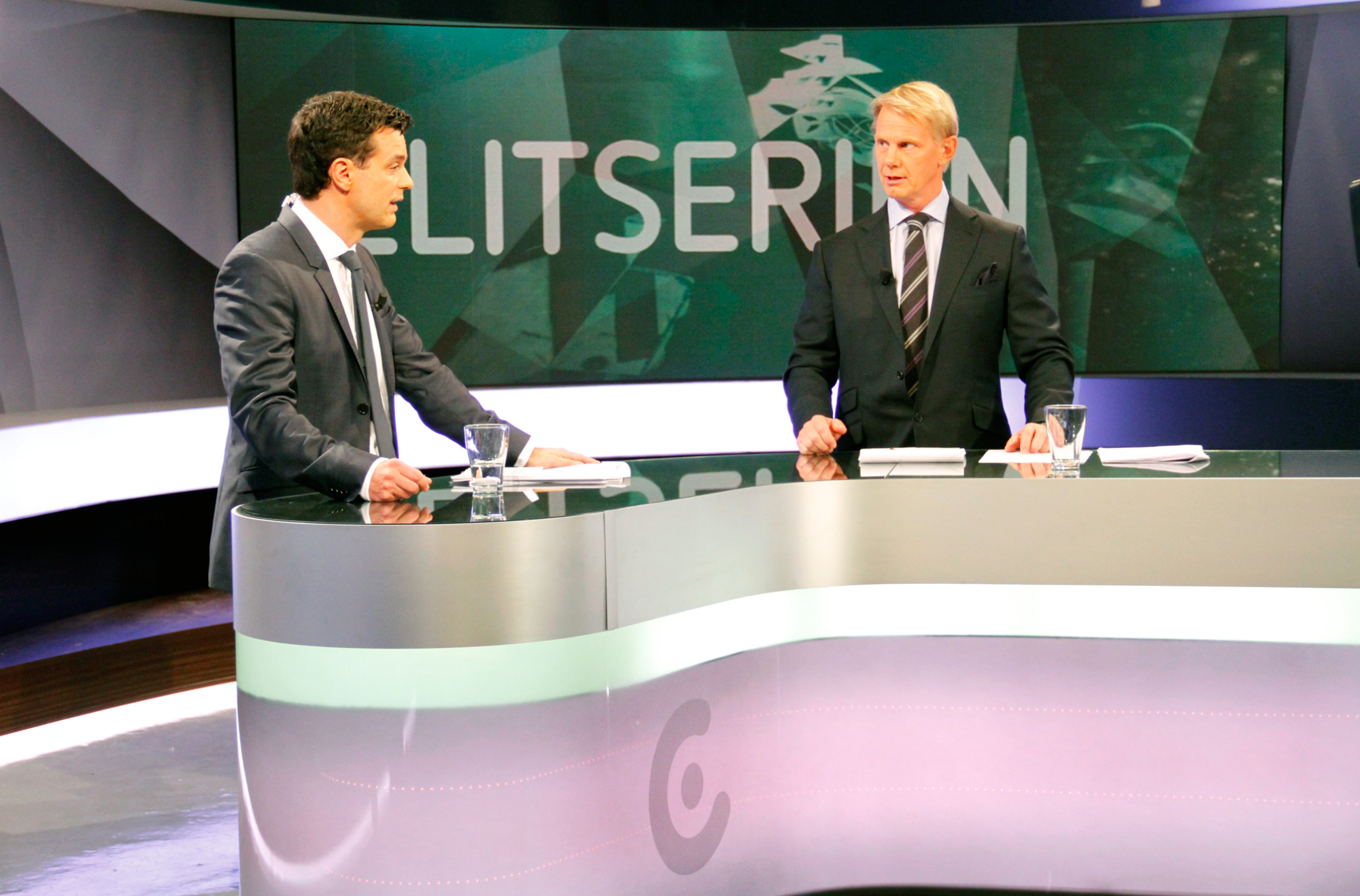
Hosts Tommy Åström and Niklas Wikegård inside the C More's ice hockey studio.

SHL games are broadcast nationally in Sweden by TV4 and streamed on TV4 Play. Selected games are shown in Finland by C More and in Norway by VG+. One game from each round is presented as the "Flagship Game" and shown on TV4 Hockey with a studio show before, between the periods and after the game. During the 2004–05 NHL lockout, SHL games were being broadcast in Canada by Rogers Sportsnet. In the beginning of the 2023–24 season it was announced that all games would be available on HomeofHockey.tv in the US, UK, Canada, Ireland, Netherlands, Italy, Belgium and Spain with one selected game having English commentary.

Sveriges Radio (SR) is the official radio broadcaster of the SHL. Each round is covered by Sportextra in SR P4 with reports from all arenas; all games are available in their entirety on SR's internet radio and to mobile phones via mobile network.

== Previous winners ==
Le Mat Trophy is awarded to SHL champions

=== SHL regular season winners ===
- 1976 – Brynäs IF
- 1977 – Brynäs IF
- 1978 – Brynäs IF
- 1979 – Modo AIK
- 1980 – Leksands IF
- 1981 – Skellefteå AIK
- 1982 – Färjestad BK
- 1983 – Färjestad BK
- 1984 – AIK
- 1985 – Djurgårdens IF
- 1986 – Färjestad BK
- 1987 – Färjestad BK
- 1988 – Djurgårdens IF
- 1989 – Leksands IF
- 1990 – Färjestad BK
- 1991 – Djurgårdens IF
- 1992 – Färjestad BK
- 1993 – VIK Västerås HK
- 1994 – Leksands IF
- 1995 – Djurgårdens IF
- 1996 – Luleå HF
- 1997 – Leksands IF
- 1998 – Djurgårdens IF
- 1999 – Modo Hockey
- 2000 – Djurgårdens IF
- 2001 – Djurgårdens IF
- 2002 – Färjestad BK
- 2003 – Frölunda HC
- 2004 – HV71
- 2005 – Frölunda HC
- 2006 – HV71
- 2007 – Färjestad BK
- 2008 – HV71
- 2009 – Färjestad BK
- 2010 – HV71
- 2011 – HV71
- 2012 – Luleå HF
- 2013 – Skellefteå AIK
- 2014 – Skellefteå AIK
- 2015 – Skellefteå AIK
- 2016 – Skellefteå AIK
- 2017 – HV71
- 2018 – Växjö Lakers
- 2019 – Färjestad BK
- 2020 – Luleå HF
- 2021 – Växjö Lakers
- 2022 – Rögle BK
- 2023 – Växjö Lakers
- 2024 – Färjestad BK
- 2025 – Brynäs IF
- 2026 – Skellefteå AIK

=== SHL playoff winners (Swedish champions) ===
- 1976 – Brynäs IF
- 1977 – Brynäs IF
- 1978 – Skellefteå AIK
- 1979 – Modo AIK
- 1980 – Brynäs IF
- 1981 – Färjestad BK
- 1982 – AIK
- 1983 – Djurgårdens IF
- 1984 – AIK
- 1985 – Södertälje SK
- 1986 – Färjestad BK
- 1987 – IF Björklöven
- 1988 – Färjestad BK
- 1989 – Djurgårdens IF
- 1990 – Djurgårdens IF
- 1991 – Djurgårdens IF
- 1992 – Malmö IF
- 1993 – Brynäs IF
- 1994 – Malmö IF
- 1995 – HV71
- 1996 – Luleå HF
- 1997 – Färjestad BK
- 1998 – Färjestad BK
- 1999 – Brynäs IF
- 2000 – Djurgårdens IF
- 2001 – Djurgårdens IF
- 2002 – Färjestad BK
- 2003 – Frölunda HC
- 2004 – HV71
- 2005 – Frölunda HC
- 2006 – Färjestad BK
- 2007 – Modo Hockey
- 2008 – HV71
- 2009 – Färjestad BK
- 2010 – HV71
- 2011 – Färjestad BK
- 2012 – Brynäs IF
- 2013 – Skellefteå AIK
- 2014 – Skellefteå AIK
- 2015 – Växjö Lakers
- 2016 – Frölunda HC
- 2017 – HV71
- 2018 – Växjö Lakers
- 2019 – Frölunda HC
- 2020 – Not held due to COVID-19 pandemic in Sweden
- 2021 – Växjö Lakers
- 2022 – Färjestad BK
- 2023 – Växjö Lakers
- 2024 – Skellefteå AIK
- 2025 – Luleå HF
- 2026 – Skellefteå AIK

== Video games ==
Teams from the league are playable in the video games Elitserien 95 and Elitserien 96 for Sega Mega Drive, and Elitserien 2001 for PC. Since NHL 2004, teams have appeared in EA Sports' NHL series.

== See also ==
- Marathon SHL standings
- List of ice hockey leagues in Sweden
