= Mora IK =

- City: Mora, Sweden
- League: HockeyAllsvenskan
- Founded: 1935
- Home arena: Wibe Arena
- Colours
- General manager: Peter Hermodsson
- Head coach: Johan Hedberg
- Captain: Daniel Ljunggren
- Website: moraik.se

Mora IK (or Mora Ishockeyklubb) is a Swedish professional ice hockey club based in Mora, Sweden. After failing the 2019 SHL qualifiers, Mora has been relegated for play in the second-tier league, HockeyAllsvenskan. Mora has previously played 25 seasons in the top tier, including four seasons in Elitserien (as the SHL was called at the time). The team has reached the finals of the Swedish Championships only once, in 1950, a match which they lost 7–2 to Djurgårdens IF. Mora has played in the top two tiers of Swedish hockey since the 1944–45 season.

== History ==
Mora IK was founded in 1935. In 1945, the club reached the top tier of ice hockey in Sweden for the first time, and participated in their first (and to date only) Swedish Championship final in 1950. Mora yo-yoed in and out of the top league, Division 1, until 1966, when they managed to maintain a spot in Division 1 for nine consecutive seasons, which remains Mora's longest run in Sweden's top hockey league. In 1975, Elitserien was founded as a new top-tier hockey league, and Mora failed to qualify for this new league. They would continue play in Division 1 in its new function as Sweden's second-tier league, for 29 years, until 2004 when they managed promotion to Elitserien for the first time.

The club took advantage of the 2004–05 NHL lockout to sign several NHL players, including Shawn Horcoff, Daniel Cleary and brothers Marian Hossa and Marcel Hossa. They finished 9th that season, a respectable position for a newly promoted team. Mora finished 8th in both the 2005–06 and 2006–06 seasons, and accordingly participated in the Swedish Championship playoffs for the first time since 1970, but were eliminated in the quarterfinals each time. The 2007–08 Elitserien season resulted with Mora in 11th place, forcing them to play in the 2008 Elitserien qualifier (Kvalserien) to retain their spot in Elitserien. They finished 4th in that tournament, resulting in relegation back to HockeyAllsvenskan.

During the 2012–13 NHL lockout, Bobby Ryan of the Anaheim Ducks and Anze Kopitar of the Stanley Cup-winning Los Angeles Kings joined the team to play with his brother, Gašper, for the duration of the lockout. This period in the second tier came to an end after nine years when Mora defeated local rivals Leksands IF 4–2 in games in the 2017 SHL qualifiers, taking their spot in the top flight. Their rivalries are commonly referred to as Siljansderbyt (English: the Siljan derby). The team would once again face Leksand in the 2019 SHL qualifiers, after finishing 13th in the regular season, where they lost 4–1 in games to Leksand and thus were relegated to HockeyAllsvenskan while Leksand took their SHL spot for the next season.

== Seasons-by-season records ==
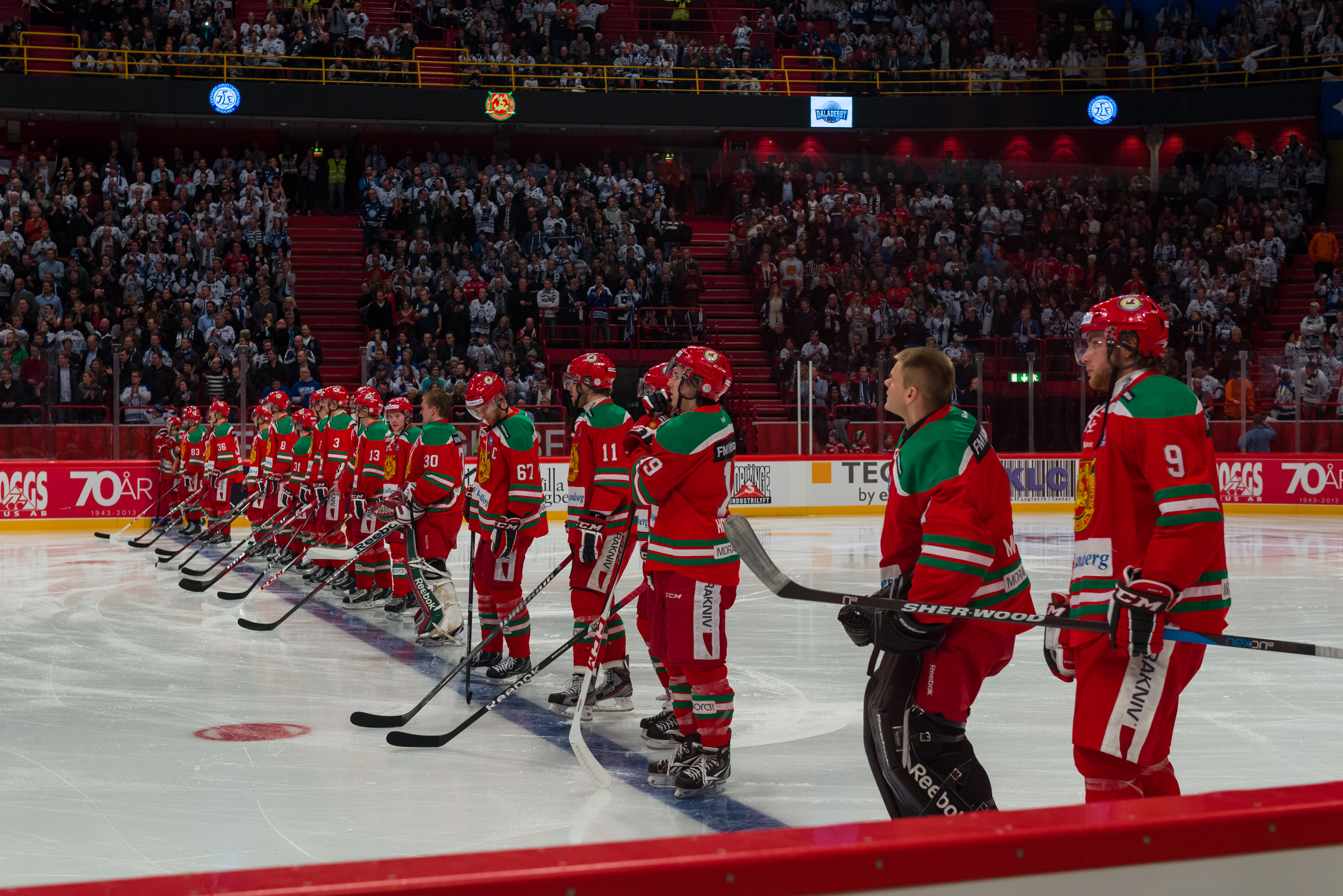
Mora IK in pre-game ceremony on 5 January 2013.

This is a partial list, featuring the five most recent completed seasons. For the full season-by-season history, see List of Mora IK seasons

Year	Level	League	Record		Avg. home atnd.	Notes	Ref.
Year	Level	League	Position	W–OTW-OTL–L	Avg. home atnd.	Notes	Ref.
2014–15	Tier 2	HockeyAllsvenskan	7th	22–3–7–20	2,710		
2014–15	Tier 2	HockeyAllsvenskan playoffs	5th	1–0–3–1	2,540		
2015–16	Tier 2	HockeyAllsvenskan	6th	20–6–6–20	2,924		
2015–16	Tier 2	HockeyAllsvenskan playoffs	2nd	3–1–0–1	3,018		
2016–17	Tier 2	HockeyAllsvenskan	1st	31–4–4–13	3,062		
2016–17	Tier 2	HockeyAllsvenskan finals	—	3–0–0–0	4,050	Won 3–0 in games vs BIK Karlskoga	
2016–17	SHL qualifiers		—	4–0–0–2	4,500	Won 4–2 in games vs Leksands IF ▲ Promoted to the SHL	
2017–18	Tier 1	SHL	13th	13–5–2–32	4,118		
2017–18	SHL qualifiers		—	4–0–0–1	4,500	Won 4–1 in games vs Leksands IF	
2018–19	Tier 1	SHL	13th	13–9–3–27	4,070		
2018–19	SHL qualifiers		—	1–0–1–3	4,500	Lost 1–4 in games vs Leksands IF ▼Relegated to HockeyAllsvenskan	

== Players and personnel ==
=== Current roster ===
Updated 9 March, 2023.

No.	Nat	Player	Pos	S/G	Age	Acquired	Birthplace
22	(Sweden)	Måns Carlsson (A)	C	L	29	2019	Stockholm, Sweden
39	(Sweden)	Kristoffer Gunnarsson (A)	D	L	29	2019	Borås, Sweden
26	(Sweden)	Isac Heens	D	L	26	2020	Stockholm, Sweden
4	(Norway)	Johannes Johannesen	D	R	29	2022	Stavanger, Norway
45	(Sweden)	Andreas Ljunggren	G	L	31	2021	Stockholm, Sweden
90	(Sweden)	Daniel Ljunggren (C)	C	L	32	2019	Stockholm, Sweden
7	(Sweden)	Ludvig Markman	D	L	22	2022	Linköping, Sweden
71	(Sweden)	Alexander Molldén	D	R	31	2022	Kristianstad, Sweden
28	(Sweden)	Jonathan Myrenberg	D	R	23	2022	Täby, Sweden
30	(Finland)	Kari Piiroinen	G	L	25	2022	Helsinki, Finland
33	(Sweden)	Olle Strandell	D	L	26	2021	Leksand, Sweden
6	(Sweden)	Oskar Tängerby	D	R	22	2022	Falun, Sweden

=== Team captains ===
- Magnus Sandberg, 2003–06
- Jarno Kultanen, 2006–07
- Håkan Bogg, 2007–08
- Greger Artursson, 2009–10
- Niklas Fogström, 2010–11
- Peter Nolander, 2011–12
- Tobias Ericsson, 2012–13
- Jeremy Colliton, 2013–14
- Johan Alcén, 2013–14
- Kevin Mitchell, 2014–15
- Daniel Hermansson, 2015–16
- Emil Bejmo, 2016–17
- Tomas Skogs, 2017–18
- Adam Masuhr, 2018–20
- Mattias Nørstebø, 2020–21
- Daniel Ljunggren, 2021–present

=== Honored members ===
Mora IK retired numbers
No.	Player	Position	Career	No. retirement
14	Mats Lönn	F	1956–1974	–
17	Hans Hansson	F	1967–1984	–
21	Per Danielsson	F	1974–1975	–
24	Bengt Åkerblom	C	1990–1995	–
25	Nils-Göran Olsson	F	1973–1975	–
78	Mikael Simons	RW	1994–2010	–

== Rivalries ==
Mora IK are Rivals with Leksands IF.
