= 1941–42 Division 2 season (Swedish ice hockey) =

- League: (Sweden) Division 2
- Sport: Ice hockey
- Teams: 18 clubs (in 3 groups of 6)
- Group winners: UoIF Matteuspojkarna (north); IF Aros (central); IFK Mariefred (south)
- Promoted to Division 2 to Svenska Serien: IFK Mariefred; UoIF Matteuspojkarna

2nd tier Division 2 seasons
- 1940–41 1942–43

The 1941–42 season of Division 2 was the second tier of ice hockey in Sweden for that season. The league was divided into three groups—north, central, and south (norra, centrala and södra)— each containing six teams. The winning team from each group played a promotion which resulted in IFK Mariefred and UoIF Matteuspojkarna qualifying for play in the Svenska Serien for the 1942–43 season.

== Final standings ==
=== Northern group (Division 2 norra) ===
#	Team	GP	W	T	L	GF	GA	GD	TP	Notes
1	UoIF Matteuspojkarna	10	8	1	1	40	15	+25	17	Plays qualifier for promotion to Svenska Serien.
2	Brynäs IF	10	7	0	3	27	26	+1	14	
3	Lilljanshofs IF	10	5	0	5	26	23	+3	10	
4	IK Sirius	10	4	0	6	16	21	–5	8	
5	Sandvikens IF	10	3	1	6	20	30	–10	7	
6	Hofors IF	10	2	0	8	11	25	–14	4	

=== Central group (Division 2 centrala) ===
#	Team	GP	W	T	L	GF	GA	GD	TP	Notes
1	IF Aros	10	7	1	2	38	19	+19	15	Plays qualifier for promotion to Svenska Serien.
2	Tranebergs IF	10	7	0	3	32	16	+16	14	
3	IF Verdandi	10	6	1	3	24	22	+2	13	
4	Västerås SK	10	4	1	5	15	24	–3	9	
5	Surahammars IF	10	4	0	6	17	20	–3	8	
6	Stockholms IF	10	0	1	9	19	44	–25	1	

=== Southern group (Division 2 södra) ===
#	Team	GP	W	T	L	GF	GA	GD	TP	Notes
1	IFK Mariefred	10	9	1	0	50	12	+38	19	Plays qualifier for promotion to Svenska Serien.
2	Södertälje IF	10	7	1	2	35	18	+17	15	
3	IK Sture	10	4	1	5	22	31	–9	9	
4	IK Sleipner	10	4	1	5	23	32	–9	9	
5	Årsta SK	10	3	0	7	21	32	–11	6	
6	GoIF Tjalve	10	1	0	9	13	39	–26	2	

== See also ==
- 1941–42 Svenska Serien season
- 1942 Swedish Ice Hockey Championship
