= 1942–43 Division 2 season (Swedish ice hockey) =

- League: (Sweden) Division 2
- Sport: Ice hockey
- Number of teams: 26 (in 4 groups)
- Group winners: Brynäs IF (north); IF Aros (central); Nacka SK (east); Årsta SK (south)
- Promoted to Division 2: Brynäs IF; Nacka SK
- Relegated to district-level: IFK Stockholm

2nd tier Division 2 seasons
- ← 1941–42 1943–44 →

The 1942–43 Division 2 season was the second tier of ice hockey in Sweden in for the 1942–43 season. The league operated a system of promotion and relegation, to the first-tier Svenska Serien and to district-level hockey leagues. The league consisted of four groups, two with seven clubs (north and east) and two with six (central and south), giving a total of 26 clubs. The group winners, Brynäs IF (north), IF Aros (central), Nacka SK (east), and Årsta SK (south) won their groups, and continued to play in a qualifier for promotion to Svenska Serien, which resulted in Brynäs and Nacka being promoted to the 1943–44 Svenska Serien. IFK Stockholm finished last in Division 2 North, and as a result were relegated to their local level hockey league.

== Final standings ==
=== North group ===
Division 2 norra
#	Team	GP	W	T	L	GF	GA	GD	TP	Notes
1	Brynäs IF	12	11	0	1	70	20	+50	22	Continued to qualifier for promotion to Svenska Serien
2	Sandvikens IF	12	9	0	3	58	31	+27	18	
3	IK Huge	12	8	0	4	66	26	+40	16	
4	Strömsbro IF	12	6	0	6	33	52	–19	12	
5	Hofors IK	12	5	0	7	27	50	–23	10	
6	Gefle IF	12	1	1	10	22	42	–20	3	
7	IFK Gävle	12	1	1	10	18	73	–55	3	Relegated to local district leagues

=== Central group ===
Division 2 centrala
#	Team	GP	W	T	L	GF	GA	GD	TP	Notes
1	IF Aros	6	5	0	1	20	14	+6	10	Continued to qualifier for promotion to Svenska Serien
2	Surahammars IF	6	4	0	2	10	9	+1	8	
3	Västerås IK	7	3	1	3	17	14	+3	7	
4	Västerås SK	7	3	0	4	16	16	±0	6	
5	IF Verdandi	5	2	0	3	13	13	±0	4	
6	IK Westmannia	7	1	1	5	11	21	–10	3	

=== East group ===
Division 2 östra
#	Team	GP	W	T	L	GF	GA	GD	TP	Notes
1	Nacka SK	10	8	1	1	57	17	+40	17	Continued to qualifier for promotion to Svenska Serien
2	Lilljanshofs IF	9	5	0	4	22	21	+1	10	
3	Tranebergs IF	6	2	1	3	13	16	–3	5	
4	IF Vesta	7	2	0	5	14	21	–7	4	
5	Rålambshofs IF	5	2	0	3	15	24	–9	4	
6	IFK Lidingö	5	2	0	3	10	19	–9	4	
7	IK Sirius	6	1	0	5	10	24	–14	2	

=== South group ===
Division 2 södra
#	Team	GP	W	T	L	GF	GA	GD	TP	Notes
1	Årsta SK	6	6	0	0	27	5	+22	12	Continued to qualifier for promotion to Svenska Serien
2	Södertälje IF	8	4	1	3	26	24	+2	9	
3	Åkers IF	7	3	1	3	16	18	–2	7	
4	IFK Norrköping	5	2	1	2	12	13	–1	5	
5	IK Sleipner	5	2	0	3	11	15	–4	4	
6	IK Sture	9	1	1	7	11	28	–17	3	

== Svenska Serien qualifier ==
The winning teams from each group—Brynäs IF (north), IF Aros (central), Nacka SK (east), and Årsta SK (south)—played a qualifier for promotion to Sweden's first-tier hockey league. Brynäs and Nacka won this qualifier, and as a result competed in the 1943–44 Svenska Serien.

== See also ==
- 1942–43 Svenska Serien season
- 1943 Swedish Ice Hockey Championship
