= Coach of the Year (ice hockey) =

Swedish Ice Hockey Coach of the Year
- Date: 1992
- Country: Sweden

The Swedish Ice Hockey Coach of the Year (Swedish: Årets Coach) has been awarded to the best ice hockey coach in Sweden each season since the 1991–92 season. The award was created in honor of Arne Strömberg, and Kamratföreningen Hockeyjournalisterna is the jury which votes on the award. The award has usually gone to a coach in the top-tier league (SHL/Elitserien), although the award is not specific to the top-tier league.

== Winners ==
- 1991–92: Tommy Sandlin, Brynäs IF
- 1992–93: Tommy Sandlin (2), Brynäs IF
- 1993–94: Kent Forsberg, MoDo Hockey
- 1994–95: Sune Bergman, HV71
- 1995–96: Lasse Falk, Västra Frölunda HC
- 1996–97: Per Bäckman, Färjestad BK
- 1997–98: Bo Lennartsson, Färjestad BK
- 1998–99: Roger Melin, Brynäs IF
- 1999–00: Hardy Nilsson, Djurgårdens IF
- 2000–01: Peo Larsson, Timrå IK
- 2001–02: Jim Brithén, MoDo Hockey
- 2002–03: Conny Evensson, Västra Frölunda HC
- 2003–04: Pär Mårts, HV71
- 2004–05: Stephan Lundh, Frölunda HC
- 2005–06: Bengt-Åke Gustafsson, Sweden men's national ice hockey team
- 2006–07: Harald Lückner, Modo Hockey
- 2007–08: Kent Johansson, HV71
- 2008–09: Per-Erik Johnsson and Tommy Samuelsson, Färjestad BK
- 2009–10: Hardy Nilsson (2), Djurgårdens IF
- 2010–11: Roger Melin (2), AIK
- 2011–12: Tommy Jonsson, Brynäs IF
- 2012–13: Peter Andersson, Örebro HK
- 2013–14: Hans Wallson, Skellefteå AIK
- 2014–15: Per Hånberg, Karlskrona HK
- 2015–16: Per-Erik Johnsson (2), Leksands IF
- 2016–17: Thomas Berglund, Brynäs IF
- 2017–18: Sam Hallam, Växjö Lakers
- 2018–19: Håkan Åhlund, IK Oskarshamn
- 2019–20: No award due to COVID-19
- 2020–21: Fredrik Andersson, Timrå IK
- 2021–22: Martin Filander, IK Oskarshamn
- 2022–23: Jörgen Jönsson, Växjö Lakers HC
- 2023–24: Niklas Gällstedt, Brynäs IF

== See also ==
- Leader of the Year (ice hockey)
