= 1943–44 Division 2 season (Swedish ice hockey) =

- League: (Sweden) Division 2
- Sport: Ice hockey
- Group winners: Sandvikens IF (north); IF Göta (west); Surahammars IF (central); IFK Mariefred (Mälar); Tranebergs IF (east); Skuru IK (south)

2nd tier Division 2 seasons
- ← 1942–43 1944–45 →

Division 2 was the second tier of ice hockey in Sweden for the 1943–44 season. The league was divided into six groups, and the winner of each group was promoted to Division 1 for the 1944–45 season. This change from previous seasons—in which the group winners had played a qualifier which resulted in only two teams being promoted—was prompted from the change in format from the eight-team Svenska Serien to a twelve-team Division 1 following the 1943–44 season. Sandvikens IF, IF Göta, Surahammars IF, IFK Mariefred, Tranebergs IF, and Skuru IK won their groups, and were therefore promoted into the new Division 1.

The 1943 Swedish Ice Hockey Championship was held as a separate tournament, and included teams from Division 2.

== Final group standings ==
=== Norra ("north") ===
#	Team	GP	W	T	L	GF	GA	GD	TP	Notes
1	Sandvikens IF	8	8	0	0	48	14	+34	16	Promoted to Division 1 for the 1944–45 season
2	IK Huge	8	4	1	3	28	25	+3	9	
3	Gefle IF	8	3	1	4	22	34	–12	7	
4	Strömsbro IF	8	3	0	5	22	24	–2	6	
5	Hofors IK	8	1	0	7	15	38	–23	2	

=== Västra ("west") ===
#	Team	GP	W	T	L	GF	GA	GD	TP	Notes
1	IF Göta	8	8	0	0	28	6	+22	16	Promoted to Division 1 for the 1944–45 season
2	Forshaga IF	8	4	1	3	26	12	+14	9	
3	Färjestads BK	8	4	1	3	22	16	+14	9	
4	Skoghalls IF	8	3	0	5	13	20	–7	6	
5	Söderstrands IF	8	0	0	8	5	40	–35	0	Relegated to local district

=== Centrala ("central") ===
#	Team	GP	W	T	L	GF	GA	GD	TP	Notes
1	Surahammars IF	8	5	1	2	19	12	+7	11	Promoted to Division 1 for the 1944–45 season
2	Västerås SK	8	5	0	3	40	14	+26	10	
3	IF Aros	8	4	1	3	16	25	–9	9	
4	Västerås IK	8	3	1	4	10	16	–6	7	
5	IK Westmannia	8	1	1	6	10	28	–18	3	

=== Mälargruppen ===
#	Team	GP	W	T	L	GF	GA	GD	TP	Notes
1	IFK Mariefred	10	8	1	1	42	16	+26	17	Promoted to Division 1 for the 1944–45 season
2	UoIF Matteuspojkarna	10	7	1	2	52	22	+30	15	
3	Djurgårdens IF	10	6	0	4	24	22	+2	12	
4	Södertälje IF	10	4	1	5	21	32	–11	9	
5	IK Sture	10	2	0	8	20	50	–30	4	
6	Åkers IF	10	1	1	8	19	36	–17	3	

=== Östra ("east") ===
#	Team	GP	W	T	L	GF	GA	GD	TP	Notes
1	Tranebergs IF	10	9	0	1	42	22	+20	18	Promoted to Division 1 for the 1944–45 season
2	IF Vesta	10	7	1	2	30	25	+5	15	
3	IFK Lidingö	10	5	0	5	26	28	–2	10	
4	IK Sirius	10	4	0	6	22	32	–10	8	
5	Lilljanshofs IF	10	3	1	6	19	27	–8	7	Relegated to local district
6	Rålambshofs IF	10	1	0	9	16	21	–5	2	Relegated to local district

=== Södra ("south") ===
#	Team	GP	W	T	L	GF	GA	GD	TP	Notes
1	Skuru IK	8	6	0	2	25	14	+11	12	Promoted to Division 1 for the 1943–44 season
2	Årsta SK	8	5	1	2	19	16	+3	11	
3	Norrköpings AIS	8	3	1	4	20	20	±0	7	
4	IK Sleipner	8	3	0	5	15	15	±0	6	
5	IFK Norrköping	8	2	0	6	7	21	–14	4	

== See also ==
- Division 2 (Swedish ice hockey)
- 1943–44 Svenska Serien season
- 1944 Swedish Ice Hockey Championship
