= Kurt Kjellström =

Swedish footballer and ice hockey player

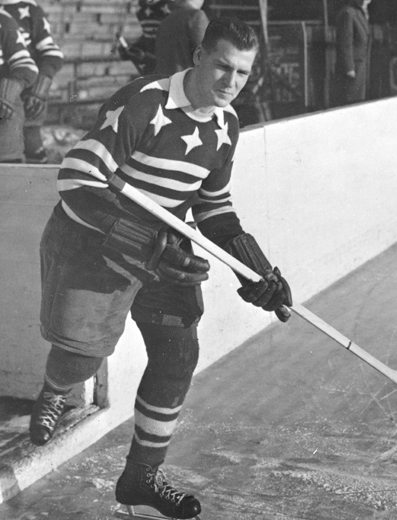
- Kjellström with Hammarby IF in 1950.
- Born: 19 March 1921; Stockholm, Sweden
- Died: 10 December 1965 (aged 44); Stockholm, Sweden
Ice hockey career
- Position: Centre
- Played for: Hammarby IF; AIK IF; Södertälje SK; Atlas Diesels IF
- National team: Sweden
- Playing career: 1931–1951
Association football career
- Position: Forward
Youth career
- Eriksdals IF
- Hammarby IF
Senior career*
Years	Team	Apps	(Gls)
1939–1940	AIK	8	(3)
1940–1947	Hammarby IF	89	(85)
1947	Ljungby IF		
- * Club domestic league appearances and goals
Bandy career
- Playing position: Forward
Senior career*
Years	Team	Apps^{†}	(Gls)^{†}
1940–1946	Hammarby		
1947	Atlas Diesels IF		
1948	Reymersholms IK		
- * Senior club appearances and goals counted for the domestic league only. † Appearances (Goals).

Kurt Kjellström (19 March 1921 – 10 December 1965) was a Swedish ice hockey, football and bandy player, best known for representing Hammarby IF in all three sports.

In 2012, Kjellström was posthumously inducted into the Swedish Hockey Hall of Fame.

== Early life ==
Kjellström was born in Stockholm and started to play ice hockey and football with local clubs Eriksdals IF and Helgalundsklubben as a youngster.

== Athletic career ==
=== Ice hockey ===
In 1938–39, Kjellström was promoted to the senior roster of Hammarby IF, in the domestic top division Svenska Serien. The club went on to win the league in an undefeated season, winning all seven matches, but no Swedish champion was crowned due to cold weather. Kjellström had his major breakthrough scoring a hat-trick when Hammarby won 3–1 against German giants SC Riessersee in an exhibition game on 29 January 1939. Ahead of the 1939–40 season, Kjellström joined fierce rivals AIK, but decided to leave the club after one year to return to Hammarby IF.

Kjellström won three Swedish championships – in 1942, 1943 and 1945 – with Hammarby IF. He formed a feared line together with wingers Stig Emanuel Andersson and Holger Nurmela, getting known as a physical and powerful center. Kjellström was the highest goal scorer in the Swedish first division for seven consecutive seasons (1940 to 1946), and scored a total of 150 goals in 121 games with Hammarby IF.

Due to World War II, Kjellström only played 15 games with the Sweden national team, scoring a total of 21 goals. He did not compete in any major international tournaments, except for the 1941 International Week of Winter Sports in Garmisch-Partenkirchen, an unofficial European championship, where Sweden lost to the host country Germany in the final.

Kjellström left Hammarby IF in 1946 together with a few other star players, as the club's finances were heavily in the red after arranging a tour to the United Kingdom. He went on to represent Södertälje SK and Atlas Diesels IF in the Swedish top division, only to return to Hammarby IF in 1950–51 when the club was crowned Swedish champions again. However, Kjellström did not play enough games to be awarded an official medal. He retired at the end of said season, but made a brief comeback for Kungsholms IF in the Swedish third tier in 1960–61 at age 40.

In 2012, Kjellström was posthumously inducted into the Swedish Hockey Hall of Fame, awarded by the Swedish Ice Hockey Association.

=== Football ===
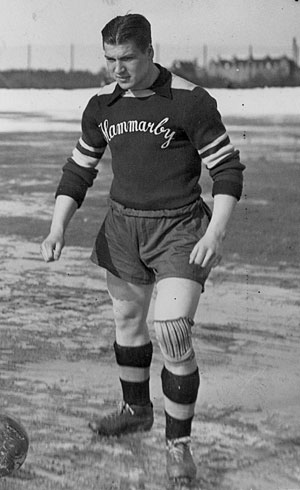
Kjellström with Hammarby IF in 1941.

After playing with the youth teams of Hammarby IF, Kjellström started also chose to represent AIK in football when he switched clubs in ice hockey. Subsequently, Kjellström made his debut in Allsvenskan, the domestic top tier, in a 2–0 home win against IK Sleipner on 22 October 1939, aged 18. He played 8 league games throughout the season, scoring 3 goals, for AIK as the club finished 6th in the table.

In 1940, Kjellström returned to Hammarby IF in Division 2. Playing as a forward, he went on to score 85 goals in 89 league games for the club in seven seasons, as the club unsuccessfully pushed for a promotion from Sweden's second division.

Kjellström left Hammarby IF in early 1947 and transferred to Ljungby IF, as the club's management offered him a job outside sports. After only a few months, however, he returned to Stockholm and went on to represent local clubs Reymersholms IK and IF Olympia in the lower divisions.

=== Bandy ===
Kjellström also played bandy. In 1941, he was called up to the Sweden B team to a game against Finland. In the 1940s, Kjellström played three seasons in Allsvenskan, the highest division, with both Hammarby IF and Reymersholms IK.

== Personal life ==
He spent the last years of his life in a wheelchair after suffering an intracranial hemorrhage. Kjellström died on 10 December 1965, aged 44.
