= Gunnar Landelius =

Swedish ice hockey player

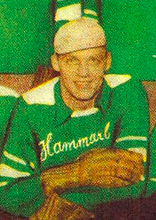
- Landelius with Hammarby IF in 1944.
- Born: Gunnar Anders Landelius; 20 March 1918; Stockholm, Sweden
- Died: 8 April 2000 (aged 82); Stockholm, Sweden
Ice hockey career
- Position: Defenceman
- Played for: Hammarby IF
- National team: Sweden
- Playing career: 1938–1950
Medal record
Representing Sweden
World Championships
Silver medal – second place	Prague 1947	Team
Association football career
- Position: Forward
Senior career*
Years	Team	Apps	(Gls)
1940–1946	Hammarby IF	25	(10)
- * Club domestic league appearances and goals
Bandy career
- Playing position: Defender / Midfielder
Senior career*
Years	Team	Apps^{†}	(Gls)^{†}
1938–1952	Hammarby IF		
- * Senior club appearances and goals counted for the domestic league only. † Appearances (Goals).

Gunnar Anders Landelius (20 March 1918 – 8 April 2000) was a Swedish ice hockey, football and bandy player, known for representing Hammarby IF in all three sports. He competed in the hockey tournament at the 1948 Winter Olympics.

== Athletic career ==
=== Ice hockey ===
Born and raised in Stockholm, Landelius started to play ice hockey with local club IK Nordia as a youngster. In 1938–39, he made his debut for Hammarby IF in Svenska Serien, the domestic top division. The club went on to win the league in an undefeated season, winning all seven matches, but no Swedish champion was crowned due to cold weather.

Landelius won three Swedish championships – in 1942, 1943 and 1945 – with Hammarby IF. In total, he played 181 games for Hammarby IF and scored 48 goals.

Due to World War II, Landelius only played 21 international games with the Sweden national team. Most notably, he was voted as the best defenceman in the 1947 World Championships as his country won the silver medal. He also competed in the 1948 Winter Olympics in St. Moritz, where Sweden finished in fourth place.

=== Football ===
In 1940, at age 22, Landelius made his debut for Hammarby IF in Division 2, Sweden's second highest football league. Playing as a forward, he went on to score 10 goals in 25 league games for the club in six seasons, being used sparingly as an emergency player, as the club unsuccessfully pushed for a promotion to Allsvenskan.

=== Bandy ===
Landelius also played bandy with Hammarby IF. In 1941, he was called up to the Sweden B team to a game against Finland. Landelius competed with the club in Allsvenskan, the highest division, for three seasons in 1944, 1946 and 1952.
