= Swedish Hockey Hall of Fame =

The Swedish Hockey Hall of Fame was created 2011 to honor those individuals who have contributed to Swedish ice hockey.

The Hall of Fame includes notable players, coaches, referees and other personalities. The first inductees were honored in 2011 and are recorded with an inductee number. Currently (2018) there are 120 inductees in the hall of fame. Some election is by voting open to the public.

Swedish Hockey Hall of Fame is independent of the International Ice Hockey Federation Hockey Hall of Fame, but operated with similar structure and regulatory framework.

== Inductees ==
- 1. Sven Tumba - Elected November 12, 2011
- 2. Lasse Björn - Elected February 9, 2012
- 3. Börje Salming - Elected February 9, 2012
- 4. Anders Hedberg - Elected February 11, 2012
- 5. Håkan Loob - Voted February 11, 2012
- 6. Ulf Sterner - Elected February 10, 2012
- 7. Leif Holmqvist - Elected February 10, 2012
- 8. Roland Stoltz - Elected February 10, 2012
- 9. Nisse Nilsson - Elected February 10, 2012
- 10. Mats Näslund - Voted February 10, 2012
- 11. Peter Lindmark - Voted May 1, 2012
- 12. Raoul Le Mat - Elected May 17, 2012
- 13. Carl Abrahamsson - Elected May 17, 2012
- 14. Sigfrid Öberg - Elected May 17, 2012
- 15. Anton Johanson - Elected May 17, 2012
- 16. Arne Johansson - Elected May 17, 2012
- 17. Kurt Kjellström - Elected May 17, 2012
- 18. Hans Georgii - Elected May 17, 2012
- 19. Gustaf Johansson - Elected May 17, 2012
- 20. Lennart Svedberg - Elected May 17, 2012
- 21. Nils Molander - Elected May 17, 2012
- 22. Einar Lundell - Elected May 17, 2012
- 23. Ragnar Backström - Elected May 17, 2012
- 24. Helge Berglund - Elected May 17, 2012
- 25. Åke Andersson - Elected May 17, 2012
- 26. Folke Jansson - Elected May 17, 2012
- 27. Erik Burman - Elected May 17, 2012
- 28. Rudolf Eklöw - Elected May 17, 2012
- 29. Lars-Erik Sjöberg - Elected May 17, 2012
- 30. Arne Strömberg - Elected May 17, 2012
- 31. Thord Flodqvist - Elected May 17, 2012
- 32. Birger Holmqvist - Elected May 17, 2012
- 33. Anders Andersson - Elected May 17, 2012
- 34. Herman Carlson - Elected May 17, 2012
- 35. Erik Johansson - Elected May 17, 2012
- 36. Axel Sandö - Elected May 17, 2012
- 37. Sven Bergqvist - Elected May 17, 2012
- 38. Ove Dahlberg - Elected May 17, 2012
- 39. Gösta Johansson - Elected May 17, 2012
- 40. Gösta Ahlin - Elected May 17, 2012
- 41. Stig-Göran Johansson - Elected May 17, 2012
- 42. Sven Thunman - Elected May 17, 2012
- 43. Holger Nurmela - Elected May 17, 2012
- 44. Sigurd Bröms - Elected May 17, 2012
- 45. Hans Mild - Elected May 17, 2012
- 46. Hans Öberg - Elected May 17, 2012
- 47. Åke Lassas - Elected May 17, 2012
- 48. Håkan Wickberg - Elected May 17, 2012
- 49. Ronald Pettersson - Elected May 17, 2012
- 50. Lennart Johansson - Elected May 17, 2012
- 51. Eilert Määttä - Elected May 17, 2012
- 52. Lars-Eric Lundvall - Elected December 21, 2012
- 53. Kjell Svensson - Elected January 21, 2013
- 54. Bert-Olov Nordlander - Elected October 29, 2012
- 55. Bo Tovland - Elected February 1, 2013
- 56. Tomas Jonsson - Voted March 3, 2013
- 57. Tomas Sandström - Elected February 21, 2013
- 58. Jörgen Jönsson - Voted December 18, 2012
- 59. Tommy Salo - Elected January 21, 2013
- 60. Bengt-Åke Gustafsson - Elected October 29, 2012
- 61. Kent Nilsson
- 62. Anders Carlsson
- 63. Rickard Fagerlund
- 64. Pelle Bergström
- 65. Mats Sundin
- 66. Peter Forsberg
- 67. Tord Lundström
- 68. Thomas Rundqvist
- 69. Jonas Bergqvist
- 70. Ulf Dahlén
- 71. Eje Lindström
- 72. Markus Näslund
- 73. Mats Waltin
- 74. Mats Åhlberg
- 75. Dan Söderström
- 76. Jan-Åke Edvinsson
- 77. Dag Olsson
- 78. Ulf Lindgren
- 79. Lars Tegnér
- 80. Christer Höglund
- 81. Viking Harbom
- 82. Thure Wickberg
- 83. Ruben Rundqvist
- 84. Georg Lundberg
- 85. Pelle Lindbergh
- 86. Arne Grunander
- 87. Börje Idenstedt
- 88. Kjell Glennert
- 89. Curt Berglund
- 90. Stig Nilsson
- 91. Tommy Sandlin
- 92. Bo Berglund
- 93. Carlabel Berglund
- 94. Sven Nordstrand
- 95. Folke Lindström
- 96. Stefan Liv
- 97. Peter Åslin
- 98. Hans Svedberg
- 99. Calle Johansson
- 100. Nicklas Lidström
- 101. Erika Holst
- 102. Maria Rooth
- 103. Gunilla Andersson
- 104. Hans Lindberg
- 105. Nils Johansson
- 106. Mikael Johansson
- 107. Ann-Louise Edstrand
- 108. Anders Eldebrink
- 109. Thommie Bergman
- 110. Conny Evensson
- 111. Gert Blomé
- 112. Tommy Albelin
- 113. Kristina Bergstrand
- 114. Ylva Martinsen
- 115. Kenny Jönsson
- 117. Annica Åhlén
- 118. Tommy Samuelsson
- 119. Lars-Göran Nilsson
- 120. Peter Andersson

== See also ==
- IIHF Hall of Fame
