= Stig Emanuel Andersson =

Swedish ice hockey player

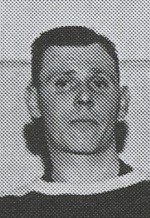
- Born: Stig Emanuel Gustaf Andersson; 16 October 1914; Stockholm, Sweden
- Died: 23 March 2000 (aged 85); Nacka, Sweden
Ice hockey career
- Position: Right wing
- Played for: Hammarby IF; Atlas Diesels IF
- National team: Sweden
- Playing career: 1932–1950
Association football career
- Positions: Forward; winger
Youth career
- Hammarby IF
Senior career*
| Years | Team | Apps | (Gls) |
| 1933–1949 | Hammarby IF | 229 | (91) |
- * Club domestic league appearances and goals
Bandy career
- Playing position: Forward
Senior career*
| Years | Team | Apps^{†} | (Gls)^{†} |
| 1932–1947 | Hammarby | | |
- * Senior club appearances and goals counted for the domestic league only. † Appearances (Goals).

Stig Emanuel "Stickan" Andersson (16 October 1914 – 23 March 2000) was a Swedish ice hockey, football and bandy player, known for representing Hammarby IF in all three sports.

He competed in the men's hockey tournaments at the 1936 Winter Olympics and the 1948 Winter Olympics.

== Early life ==
Andersson grew up in a working-class home in a southern part of Stockholm known as Södermalm. His father was working as a groundskeeper at Hammarby Idrottsplats, the home of local club Hammarby IF which he joined as a youngster, together with the likes of Sven Bergqvist.

== Athletic career ==
=== Ice hockey ===
In 1932, Andersson started to play hockey with Hammarby IF in Elitserien, Sweden's top tier. He won six Swedish championships – in 1933, 1936, 1937, 1942, 1943 and 1946 – with the club. In total, In Andersson made 220 competitive appearances for Hammarby, scoring 120 goals. He was known as both a prolific goalscorer and playmaker, playing as a right winger, forming a deadly partnership with centre Kurt Kjellström and left winger Holger Nurmela in the 1940s.

Andersson won 38 caps for the Swedish national team, scoring a total of 19 goals. He represented his country at three major tournaments: the 1936 and 1948 Winter Olympics and the 1938 World Championships. He is a recipient of the honorary award "Big boy", which is handed out by Swedish Ice Hockey Association.

In 1946, he left Hammarby for Atlas Diesels IF in the Swedish lower divisions. Andersson played three seasons for his new club until his retirement from hockey in 1950.

=== Football ===
On 3 September 1933, at the age of 18, Andersson debuted in the senior football team of Hammarby IF, in a 2–3 loss against IK Sleipner.

Between 1933 and 1949, Andersson made 229 league appearances for the club, mostly in the Swedish second tier Division 2, scoring 91 goals.

In 1939–40, Hammarby competed for one season in Allsvenskan, the domestic top league, with Andersson playing in 18 of 22 fixtures, but was relegated immediately.

=== Bandy ===
Andersson was also a prominent bandy player and played 16 seasons with Hammarby IF between 1932 and 1947. He was also a member of the Swedish national team.

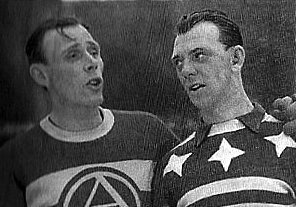
Stig Emanuel Andersson (left) with his brother Åke Andersson (right), who played hockey for different teams in 1949, Atlas Diesels IF and Hammarby IF.

== Personal life ==
He was the older brother of Åke "Plutten" Andersson, who also would become a celebrated sportsman. His son Börje Andersson also played hockey and made one season with Hammarby IF in 1968-69.

== Legacy ==
When Hammarby's ice hockey team was on tour in the United Kingdom in 1946, Stig Emanuel Andersson allegedly coined the term "Bajen", a short form of a mock-English pronunciation of "Hammarby", that has been the club's most used nickname since the 1970s.

Andersson's personal battle cry was "Bamsing - stångkorv!", which he used to shout at his teammates when it was time to really fight and preferably score two goals in a short time. This later led to Hammarby's hockey team being called "Bamsingarna", an other nickname that still lives on today.
