= Tommy Melkersson =

Swedish ice hockey player

- Born: February 1, 1965 (age 60); SWE
- Height: 6 ft 1 in (185 cm)
- Weight: 227 lb (103 kg; 16 st 3 lb)
- Position: Defender
- Shot: Left
- SEL team Former teams: Brynäs IF; IK Huge (Youth Team)
- Playing career: 1988–1999

Tommy Melkersson (born February 1, 1965) is a retired professional Swedish ice hockey player.

Melkersson was known as a hard playing defender, and won the Swedish championship with Brynäs IF twice; in 1993 and 1999.

== Career statistics ==
			Regular season					Playoffs
Season	Team	League	GP	G	A	Pts	PIM	GP	G	A	Pts	PIM
1981–82	Strömsbro IF	Division 1	2	0	0	0	0	—	—	—	—	—
1982–83	Strömsbro IF	Division 1	21	2	0	2	6	—	—	—	—	—
1983–84	Strömsbro/Gävle HF 83	Division 1	19	1	2	3	21	1	0	0	0	0
1984–85	Strömsbro/Gävle HF 83	Division 1	26	2	5	7	14	—	—	—	—	—
1985–86	Strömsbro/Gävle HF 83	Division 1	31	5	6	11	14	—	—	—	—	—
1986–87	Strömsbro/Gävle HF 83	Division 1	32	2	13	15	42	—	—	—	—	—
1987–88	Strömsbro/Gävle HF 83	Division 1	26	3	4	7	20	—	—	—	—	—
1988–89	Brynäs IF	Elitserien	38	2	2	4	24	5	0	0	0	0
1989–90	Brynäs IF	Elitserien	16	3	0	3	4	—	—	—	—	—
1990–91	Brynäs IF	Elitserien	40	0	4	4	28	2	0	0	0	6
1991–92	Brynäs IF	Elitserien	40	1	7	8	28	5	0	2	2	4
1992–93	Brynäs IF	Elitserien	39	4	7	11	44	10	0	1	1	8
1993–94	Brynäs IF	Elitserien	36	2	4	6	28	6	0	0	0	11
1994–95	Brynäs IF	Elitserien	39	1	3	4	44	14	0	1	1	18
1995–96	Brynäs IF	Elitserien	22	0	1	1	6	—	—	—	—	—
1995–96	Brynäs IF	Allsvenskan D1	18	5	5	10	24	10	1	1	2	2
1996–97	Brynäs IF	Elitserien	45	2	8	10	118	—	—	—	—	—
1997–98	Brynäs IF	Elitserien	46	2	4	6	95	3	0	0	0	2
1998–99	Brynäs IF	Elitserien	47	2	5	7	96	13	1	1	2	18
2000–01	Skutskärs SK	Division 1	—	—	—	—	—	—	—	—	—	—
2007–08	IK Huge	Division 2	12	1	4	5	4	—	—	—	—	—
Elitserien totals			408	19	45	64	515	58	1	5	6	67
Division 1 totals			157	15	30	45	117	1	0	0	0	0
