= Hans Kossmann =

Canadian-Swiss ice hockey player (born 1962)

Hans Kossmann (born March 14, 1962) is a Canadian-Swiss professional ice hockey coach.

== Career ==
Born in Vancouver, British Columbia, Kossmann moved to Switzerland when he was 22 years of age. During his playing career, he spent time with several Swiss clubs, playing in the second-tier National League B (NLB) for Genève-Servette HC, EHC Bülach, SC Rapperswil-Jona and Lausanne HC. However, Kossmann never played in the Swiss top-flight National League A (NLA).

After putting an end to his playing days, he accepted the head coaching job at HC Ajoie in 1995, where he had spent his final season as a player. Kossmann parted ways with Ajoie in November 1996 and was hired by fellow NLB team SC Luzern in March 1997. He then joined the coaching staff of EHC Biel, serving as assistant coach from 1997 to 1999. In 1999-2000, he had a short assistant coach stint at HC Fribourg-Gottéron and then served as head coach of HC Sierre for some months.

From 2001 to 2008, Kossmann worked as assistant coach to Chris McSorley at Genève-Servette HC, helping lift the team from NLB to NLA in 2002. In 2008, McSorley and Kossmann guided Servette to the NLA finals.

In 2008-09, Kossmann worked as an assistant coach for the championship-winning Lausanne HC in the NLB, followed by two years in the same position at NLA's SC Bern, where he contributed to winning the Swiss national championship in 2010.

In 2011, he was named head coach and general manager of HC Fribourg-Gottéron of the National League A, guiding the team to the playoff-semifinals his first year and to the NLA finals the following season. In 2013–14, Kossmann coached Fribourg-Gottéron to another semifinal-appearance. He was relieved of his duties in October 2014 having collected just eight points from the eleven opening fixtures of the 2014–15 campaign.

Kossmann was named head coach of NLA side HC Ambrì-Piotta in October 2015. He was sacked on January 30, 2017 after six straight losses and dropping to the bottom of the NLA table. On December 29, 2017, he took over the head coaching job at ZSC Lions, serving as a caretaker coach for the remainder of the 2017–18 season after the club had parted ways with Hans Wallson. Under Kossmann's guidance, the Lions won the 2018 Swiss championship, defeating Lugano 4-3 in the finals.

On October 23, 2018, he took over the head coaching job at Grizzlys Wolfsburg in the German DEL. He parted ways with the team at the end of the 2018–19 season. In late January 2020, Kossmann signed a contract as head coach of SC Bern for the remainder of the 2019–20 season.

== Personal life ==
Born in Vancouver, British Columbia, Kossmann grew up in Smithers, British Columbia. His father had left his home in Schaffhausen, Switzerland to move to Canada as a 23-year-old.
