= Coach of the Year =

Generic award title

Many sports leagues, sportswriting associations, and other organizations confer "Coach of the Year" awards. In some sports — including baseball and association football — the award is called the "Manager of the Year" award.

Some of these are:

- AFCA Coach of the Year (American collegiate football) (US)
- Annis Stukus Trophy (Canadian Football League)
- Associated Press College Basketball Coach of the Year (NCAA Division I men's and women's basketball) (US)
- Clair Bee Coach of the Year (NCAA Division I men's basketball) (US)
- Geno Auriemma Award (NCAA Division I women's basketball) (US)
- Henry Iba Award (NCAA Division I men's basketball) (US)
- IHJUK Coach of the Year Trophy (Ice Hockey Journalists UK)
- Jack Adams Award (National Hockey League, US & Canada)
- Jake Milford Trophy (Central Hockey League, US; named after Jake Milford)
- Major Indoor Soccer League Coach of the Year (US)
- Major League Lacrosse Coach of the Year (US)
- Naismith College Coach of the Year (NCAA Division I basketball) (US)
- NABC Coach of the Year (men's college basketball, US)
- National Basketball Association Coach of the Year (US & Canada)
- National Basketball League Coach of the Year (Australia)
- National Football League Coach of the Year (US)
- National Women's Soccer League Coach of the Year (US)
- Sigi Schmid Coach of the Year Award (Major League Soccer, US & Canada)
- Swedish Ice Hockey Coach of the Year
- USA Swimming Golden Goggle Awards Coach of the Year
- United States Olympic & Paralympic Committee Coach of the Year
- Walter Camp Coach of the Year Award (college football) (US)
- Women's National Basketball Association (US) Coach of the Year

== See also ==
- Coach Award (BBC Sports Personality of the Year) (UK)
- Best Coach/Manager ESPY Award (all sports) (US)
- Manager of the Year Award (Major League Baseball) (US)
- Football Manager of the Year (Germany)
- Philips Sports Manager of the Year (Ireland)
- Premier League Manager of the Season (England)
