= Holger Nurmela =

Swedish ice hockey player (1920–2005)

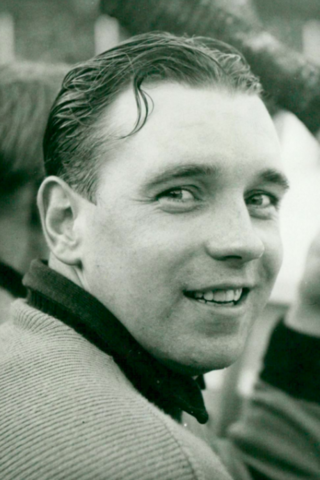
- Holger Nurmela in 1949.
- Born: 28 October 1920; Stockholm, Sweden
- Died: 1 March 2005 (aged 84); Tumba, Sweden
Ice hockey career
- Position: Left winger
- Played for: Hammarby IF / AIK / Saltsjöbadens IF
- National team: Sweden
- Playing career: 1937–1956
Medal record
Representing Sweden
Olympic Games
Bronze medal – third place	1952 Oslo	Team
World Championships
Silver medal – second place	1947 Prague	Team
Bronze medal – third place	1954 Stockholm	Team
Association football career
- Position: Forward
Youth career
- Hammarby IF
Senior career*
Years	Team	Apps	(Gls)
1939–1950	Hammarby IF	111	(77)
- * Club domestic league appearances and goals
Bandy career
- Playing position: Forward
Senior career*
Years	Team	Apps^{†}	(Gls)^{†}
1939–1950	Hammarby IF		
- * Senior club appearances and goals counted for the domestic league only. † Appearances (Goals).

Holger "Hogge" Nurmela (28 October 1920 – 1 March 2005) was a Swedish ice hockey, football and bandy player and manager, known for representing Hammarby IF in all three sports.

== Athletic career ==
=== Ice hockey ===
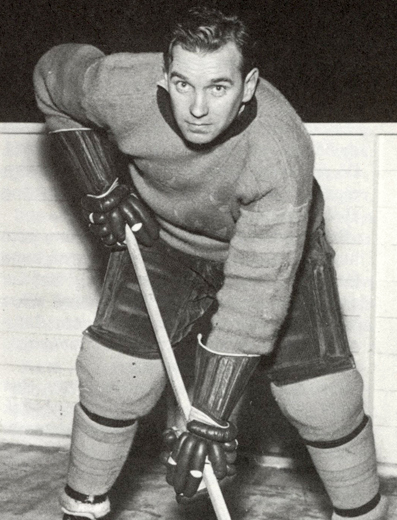
Holger Nurmela playing for the Sweden national team.

In 1937, Nurmela made his debut for Hammarby IF in Elitserien, Sweden's top tier. He won three Swedish championships – 1942, 1943 and 1945 – with the club. He formed a feared line together with right winger Stig Emanuel Andersson and centre Kurt Kjellström.

Nurmela was known as a versatile player with great skating abilities: a sniper, playmaker and grinder combined. He won the scoring league in the Swedish top division in both 1949 and 1950. In total, he made 204 competitive appearances for Hammarby, scoring 154 goals.

In 1950, Nurmela joined rivals AIK, which caused some upset among the Hammarby supporters. He stayed with the club for two seasons, after which he played three years with Saltsjöbadens IF in the lower divisions.

He returned to Hammarby in 1955–56 as a player-coach, before retiring from hockey after the Elitserien season. He worked as the head coach of Hammarby between 1955–1957 and 1966–1971.

Nurmela played 121 international games for the Sweden national team, scoring 84 goals, and regularly captained the side. Nurmela represented his country at several major tournaments, such as several World Championships. He competed at the 1948, 1952 and 1956 Winter Olympics and won a bronze medal in 1952, finishing fourth in 1948 and 1956.

He is a recipient of the honorary award "Big boy" and was inducted into the Swedish Hockey Hall of Fame in 2012; both awards are handed out by Swedish Ice Hockey Association.

=== Football ===
In 1939, at age 18, Nurmela debuted in the senior football team of Hammarby IF. During his full first season, in 1939–40, Hammarby competed for one season in Allsvenskan, the domestic top league, with Nurmela playing 16 of 22 fixtures and scoring 7 goals, but was relegated immediately.

Up until 1950, Nurmela made a total of 111 league appearances for Hammarby, mostly in the Swedish second tier Division 2, scoring 77 goals playing as a forward.

=== Bandy ===
Nurmela was also a prominent bandy player for Hammarby IF between 1940 and 1950.
