= 1934–35 Elitserien season =

Swedish ice hockey league season

The 1934–35 Elitserien season was the eighth and final season of the Elitserien, the top level ice hockey league in Sweden. It was replaced by the Svenska Serien for 1935-36. Hammarby IF won the Elitserien title for the third consecutive year.

== Final standings ==
	Team	GP	W	T	L	+/-	P
1	Hammarby IF	14	10	2	2	36 - 13	24
2	AIK	14	7	3	4	42 - 29	17
3	IK Göta	14	7	3	4	24 - 25	17
4	Södertälje SK	14	5	5	4	22 - 20	15
5	IK Hermes	14	6	3	5	22 - 24	15
6	Karlbergs BK	14	5	4	5	24 - 22	14
7	Nacka SK	14	2	4	8	20 - 3	8
8	UoIF Matteuspojkarna	14	1	2	11	18 - 42	4
