= Roger Melin =

Swedish ice hockey player and coach

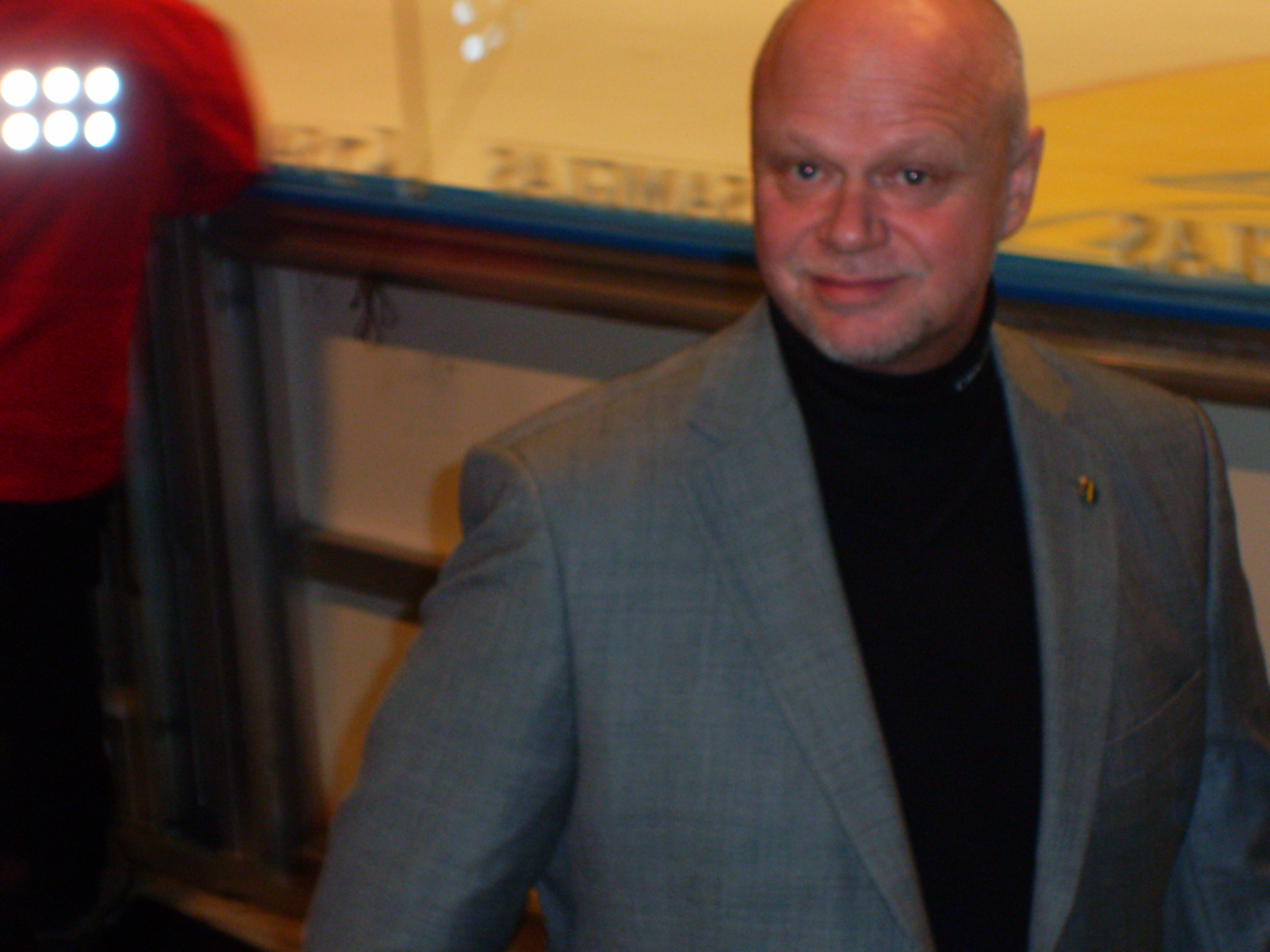
- Roger Melin in October 2008
- Born: April 25, 1956 (age 69) Enköping, Sweden
- Height: 6 ft 3 in (191 cm)
- Weight: 205 lb (93 kg; 14 st 9 lb)
- Position: Center
- Shot: Left
- Played for: Hammarby IF; Minnesota North Stars; Örebro IK; AIK
- NHL draft: Undrafted
- Playing career: 1972–1985; 1988

Roger Melin (born April 25, 1956) is a Swedish ice hockey coach and former player who most recently served as head coach of Leksands IF of the SHL. He has also previously coached SHL clubs Brynäs IF, Färjestad BK, Frölunda HC, AIK and Linköping HC, as well as Hammarby IF and Rögle BK in the Swedish second-tier league. His playing career included five seasons in the Elitserien, with AIK, Örebro IK, and Hammarby, as well as several seasons in the second and third tiers with Väsby IK. His brief stint in North America during the 1980–81 and 1981–82 seasons was mostly spent in the Central Hockey League, though he also played 3 National Hockey League games with the Minnesota North Stars

He has been named Swedish ice hockey's Coach of the Year (Årets coach) on two occasions, first following Brynäs IF's Swedish championship title in 1999, and later for coaching AIK to the semifinals in 2011 in their first season after being promoted to Elitserien.

== Playing career ==
Melin began playing A-level ice hockey in 1973, at the age of 16, with Swedish club Väsby IK in Division 2. In his first year, he played 16 games, getting 10 points (2 goals, 8 assists). After playing 3 years with Väsby, Melin joined AIK in the Elitserien for the 1975–76 season, playing 5 games without scoring. The following year, Melin joined Örebro IK, where he would play for another 3 years, getting 34 points in 65 games. In 1979, Melin rejoined Väsby, getting 45 points (28 goals, 17 assists) in 36 games.

In the 1980–81 season, Melin moved to North America, signing a contract with the Minnesota North Stars of the NHL. That year, he scored a goal and an assist in 9 games with Minnesota's CHL affiliate, the Oklahoma City Stars, while also playing one game with Minnesota in the NHL. The following season, Melin remained scoreless in the two games he played with Minnesota, while scoring 45 points (18 goals, 27 assists) in 77 games with the CHL's Nashville South Stars.

In 1982, after 2 years in North America, Melin returned to Sweden, having never adapted to North American style of play. He would play 3 years with Hammarby IF, scoring 67 points in 88 games. In 1985, he retired as a player.

In 1987–88, when Melin was coach of Enköpings SK of the Swedish division 2, he made a brief comeback, playing 7 games, and getting 11 points (4 goals, 7 assists).

== Career statistics ==
=== Regular season and playoffs ===
			Regular season					Playoffs
Season	Team	League	GP	G	A	Pts	PIM	GP	G	A	Pts	PIM
1970–71	Enköpings IS	SWE-5	—	—	—	—	—	—	—	—	—	—
1971–72	Enköpings IS	SWE-4	17	2	3	5	—	—	—	—	—	—
1972–73	Väsby IK	SWE-3	16	2	8	10	—	—	—	—	—	—
1973–74	Väsby IK	SWE-3	18	4	5	9	—	—	—	—	—	—
1974–75	Väsby IK	SWE-3	22	11	12	23	—	—	—	—	—	—
1975–76	AIK	SWE	5	0	0	0	0	—	—	—	—	—
1975–76	Örebro IK	SWE	21	3	3	6	2	—	—	—	—	—
1977–78	Örebro IK	SWE-2	21	5	17	22	2	—	—	—	—	—
1978–79	Örebro IK	SWE	23	2	1	3	4	—	—	—	—	—
1979–80	Väsby IK	SWE-2	36	28	17	45	12	—	—	—	—	—
1980–81	Väsby IK	SWE-2	32	16	12	28	20	—	—	—	—	—
1980–81	Minnesota North Stars	NHL	1	0	0	0	0	—	—	—	—	—
1980–81	Oklahoma City Stars	CHL	9	1	1	2	4	—	—	—	—	—
1981–82	Minnesota North Stars	NHL	2	0	0	0	0	—	—	—	—	—
1981–82	Nashville South Stars	CHL	77	18	27	45	7	3	0	2	2	0
1982–83	Hammarby IF	SWE	26	9	8	17	14	—	—	—	—	—
1983–84	Hammarby IF	SWE-2	33	17	19	36	22	—	—	—	—	—
1984–85	Hammarby IF	SWE	32	6	9	15	8	—	—	—	—	—
1987–88	Enköpings SK	SWE-4	9	4	7	11	—	—	—	—	—	—
SWE totals			107	20	21	41	28	—	—	—	—	—
NHL totals			3	0	0	0	0	—	—	—	—	—

Awards and achievements
Preceded by Bo Lennartsson	Coach of the Year (Sweden); 1999	Succeeded by Hardy Nilsson
Preceded by Hardy Nilsson	Coach of the Year (Sweden); 2011	Succeeded by Peter Andersson
