= List of Brynäs IF seasons =

This is a list of Brynäs IF seasons.

Season	Level	Division	Record		Avg. home atnd.	Notes
Season	Level	Division	Position	W-T-L W-OT-L	Avg. home atnd.	Notes
1999–00	Tier 1	Elitserien	2nd	28–7–15	4,490	
1999–00	Swedish Championship playoffs		—	6–5	5,496	Won in Quarterfinals, 4–2 vs HV71; Lost in Semifinals, 2–3 vs MODO
2000–01	Tier 1	Elitserien	3rd	23–13–14	4,699	
2000–01	Swedish Championship playoffs		—	0–4	4,849	Lost in Quarterfinals, 0–4 vs Malmö Redhawks
2001–02	Tier 1	Elitserien	8th	19–7–24	4,386	
2001–02	Swedish Championship playoffs		—	0–4	5,065	Lost in Quarterfinals, 0–4 vs Brynäs IF
2002–03	Tier 1	Elitserien	11th	13–4–6–27	4,569	
2002–03	2003 Elitserien qualifier		2nd	6–2–0–2	4,806	
2003–04	Tier 1	Elitserien	10th	18–2–3–27	4,638	
2004–05	Tier 1	Elitserien	11th	12–9–29	4,956	
2004–05	2005 Elitserien qualifier		2nd	6–2–2	4,988	
2005–06	Tier 1	Elitserien	7th	16–15–19	4,790	
2005–06	Swedish Championship playoffs		—	0–4	5,243	Lost in Quarterfinals, 0–4 vs Frölunda HC
2006–07	Tier 1	Elitserien	6th	18–20–17	6,664	
2006–07	Swedish Championship playoffs		—	3–4	7,261	Lost in Quarterfinals, 3–4 vs HV71
2007–08	Tier 1	Elitserien	12th	16–9–30	5,995	
2007–08	2008 Elitserien qualifier		1st	6–1–3	6,537	
2008–09	Tier 1	Elitserien	7th	21–12–22	6,116	
2008–09	Swedish Championship playoffs		—	0–4	6,261	Lost in Quarterfinals, 0–4 vs Färjestad BK
2009–10	Tier 1	Elitserien	6th	20–18–17	5,738	
2009–10	Swedish Championship playoffs		—	1–4	7,694	Lost in Quarterfinals, 1–4 vs Djurgårdens IF
2010–11	Tier 1	Elitserien	7th	19–8–8–20	5,683	
2010–11	Swedish Championship playoffs		—	1–4	7,021	Lost in Quarterfinals, 1–4 vs Färjestads BK
2011–12	Tier 1	Elitserien	4th	25–6–5–19	6,265	
2011–12	Swedish Championship playoffs		—	12–5	7,864	Won in Quarterfinals, 4–2 vs Frölunda HC; Won in Semifinals, 4–1 vs Färjestad BK; Won in Finals, 4–2 vs Skellefteå AIK; (gold) 2012 Swedish Champions (13th title)
2012–13	Tier 1	Elitserien	8th	17–6–12–20	6,229	
2012–13	Swedish Championship playoffs		—	0–4	5,994	Lost in Quarterfinals, 0–4 vs Skellefteå AIK
2013–14	Tier 1	SHL	4th	19–11–6–19	5,920	
2013–14	Swedish Championship playoffs		—	1–4	6,286	Lost in Quarterfinals, 1–4 vs Färjestad BK
2014–15	Tier 1	SHL	10th	19–3–5–28	5,103	
2014–15	Eighth-finals		—	2–1	5,790	Won 2–1 vs Färjestads BK
2014–15	Swedish Championship playoffs		—	0–4	6,104	Lost in Quarterfinals, 0–4 vs Skellefteå AIK
2015–16	Tier 1	SHL	10th	21–4–3–24	5,403	
2015–16	Eighth-finals		—	1–2	5,368	Lost 1–2 vs Djurgårdens IF
2016–17	Tier 1	SHL	5th	27–4–4–17	5,425	
2016–17	Swedish Championship playoffs		—	11–9	7,298	Won in Quarterfinals, 4–2 vs Linköping HC; Won in Semifinals, 4–3 vs Frölunda HC; Lost in Finals, 3–4 vs HV71 Silver
2017–18	Tier 1	SHL	10th	21–2–3–26	5,380	
2017–18	Eighth-finals		—	2–1	5,019	Won 2–1 vs Luleå HF
2017–18	Swedish Championship playoffs		—	1–4	6,008	Lost in Quarterfinals, 1–4 vs Växjö Lakers
2018–19	Tier 1	SHL	11th	17–2–14–19	5,231	
2019–20	Tier 1	SHL	12th	13–8–5–26	6,104	
2020–21	Tier 1	SHL	13th	14–4–7–27	150	
2020–21	Play Out		—	2–1	—	Won 4–1 vs HV71
2021–22	Tier 1	SHL	10th	17–6–6–23	4,544	
2021–22	Eighth-finals		—	1–2	5,374	Lost 1–2 vs Örebro HK
2022–23	Tier 1	SHL	13th	16–4–6–26	6,357	
2022–23	Play Out		—	1–4	7,050	Lost 1–4 vs Malmö Redhawks ▼ Relegated to HockeyAllsvenskan
2023–24	Tier 2	HockeyAllsvenskan	1st	33–5–3–11	6,442	
2023–24	Allsvenskan playoffs		—	12–1	7,109	Won in Quarterfinals, 4–0 vs Nybro Vikings; Won in Semifinals, 4–1 vs BIK Karlskoga; Won in Finals 4–0 vs Djurgårdens IF promoted to SHL
2024–25	Tier 1	SHL	1st	26–8–3–15	7,700	
2024–25	Swedish Championship playoffs		—	10–7	7,873	Won in Quarterfinals, 4–2 vs Malmö Redhawks; Won in Semifinals, 4–1 vs Skellefteå AIK; Lost in Finals 2–4 vs Luleå HF
