= 1936–37 Svenska Serien season =

Swedish ice hockey league season

The 1936–37 Svenska Serien season was the second season of the Svenska Serien, the top level ice hockey league in Sweden. AIK won the league championship for the second year in a row.

== Final standings ==
	Team	GP	W	T	L	+/-	P
1	AIK	14	13	1	0	44 - 5	27
2	Hammarby IF	14	11	2	1	31 - 9	24
3	Södertälje IF	14	3	3	2	8 - 11	8
4	IK Göta	14	6	3	5	27 - 19	15
5	Södertälje SK	14	5	2	7	20 - 21	12
6	Tranebergs IF	14	4	1	9	12 - 29	9
7	Reymersholms IK	14	3	1	10	10 - 41	7
8	UoIF Matteuspojkarna	14	0	1	13	8 - 38	1
