= 1938–39 Svenska Serien season =

Swedish ice hockey league season

The fourth season of Svenska Serien, at the time Sweden's top-tier hockey league, was scheduled to be held over the winter of 1938–39, but due to a harsh winter, the series was played as a shortened single-round robin tournament in the autumn of 1939, immediately before the start of the 1939–40 season. For this reason, there was no promotion or relegation as a result of this tournament. Hammarby IF went undefeated, winning all seven matches, to win the league title. This was the first time Hammarby finished first-place in Svenska Serien, and the fourth time Hammarby finished first in Sweden's first-tier league (which had previously been Klass I and Elitserien).

== Final standings ==
	Team	GP	W	T	L	+/-	P
1	Hammarby IF	7	7	0	0	20 - 3	14
2	IK Göta	7	4	2	1	9 - 9	8
3	Karlbergs BK	7	4	1	2	14 - 9	9
4	AIK	7	4	0	3	19 - 10	9
5	Södertälje IF	7	3	0	4	11 - 12	6
6	IK Sture	7	2	0	5	6 - 14	4
7	Nacka SK	7	1	1	5	9 - 23	3
8	Södertälje SK	7	0	2	5	7 - 15	2
