= 1928–29 Elitserien season =

Swedish ice hockey league season

The 1928–29 Elitserien season was the second season of the Elitserien, the top level ice hockey league in Sweden. Six teams participated in the league, and IK Gota won the league title for the second consecutive year.

== Final standings ==
	Team	GP	W	T	L	+/-	P
1	IK Göta	10	7	1	2	39 - 15	15
2	Södertälje SK	10	6	2	2	38 - 18	14
3	Djurgårdens IF	10	6	1	3	27 - 21	13
4	Karlbergs BK	10	4	1	5	22 - 28	9
5	Hammarby IF	10	3	1	6	25 - 38	7
6	Lidingö IF	10	1	0	5	13 - 32	2
