= Ove Molin =

Swedish ice hockey player

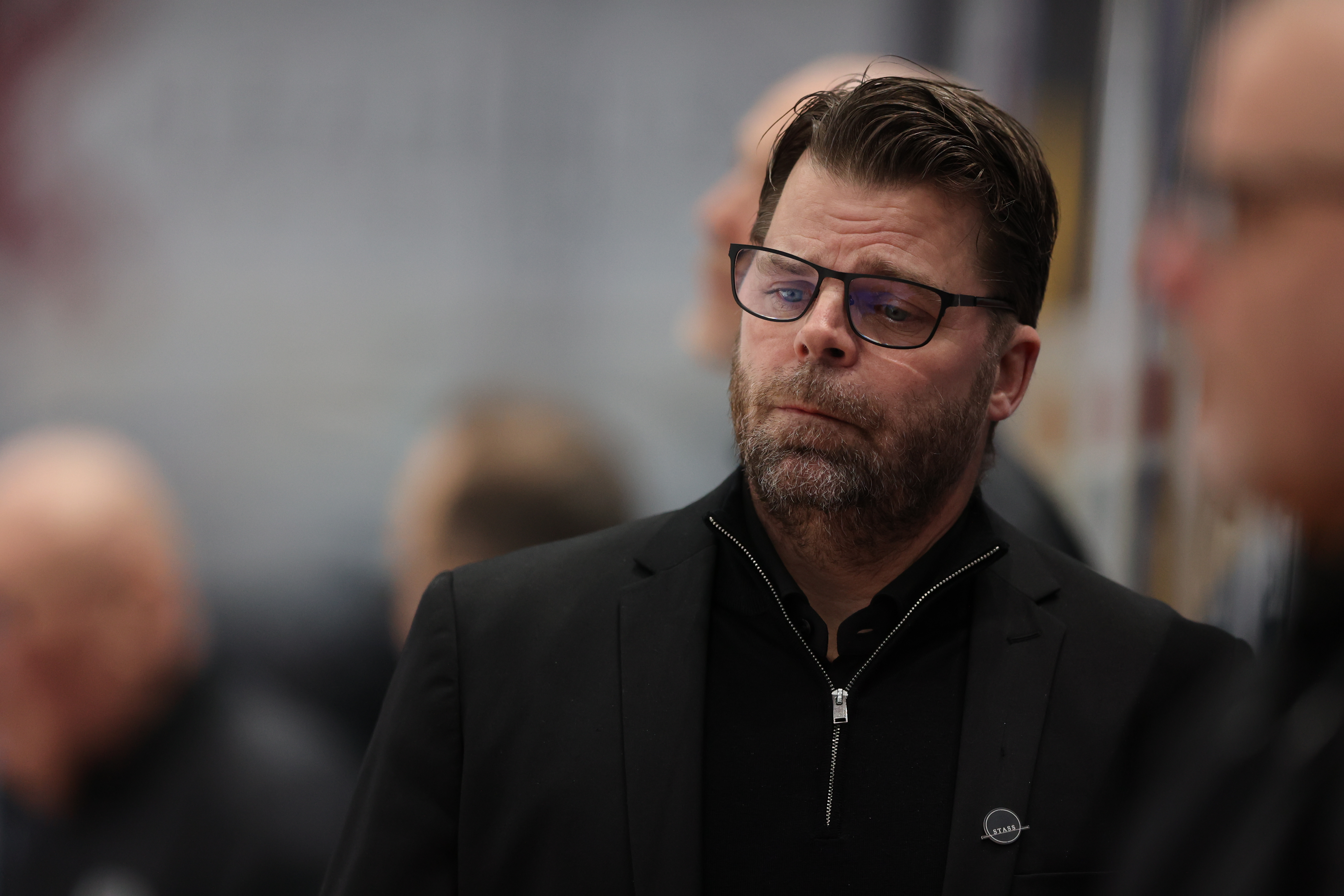
- Born: May 27, 1971 (age 55) Huddinge, Sweden
- Height: 5 ft 9 in (175 cm)
- Weight: 178 lb (81 kg; 12 st 10 lb)
- Position: Right wing
- Shot: Left
- SEL team Former teams: Brynäs IF; AIK; HIFK (SM-liiga)
- Playing career: 1989–2010

Ove Molin (born May 27, 1971) is a Swedish retired professional ice hockey player who spent most of his career with Brynäs IF in the Swedish Elite League.

== Career statistics ==
| | | | Regular season | | | | | Playoffs |
| Season | Team | League | GP | G | A | Pts | PIM | GP | G | A | Pts | PIM |
|---|---|---|---|---|---|---|---|---|---|---|---|---|
| 1988–89 | AIK IF | SHL | 2 | 0 | 0 | 0 | 0 | — | — | — | — | — |
| 1989–90 | Danderyds HC | Division 1 | 31 | 11 | 11 | 22 | 34 | — | — | — | — | — |
| 1990–91 | Danderyds HC | Division 1 | 31 | 13 | 23 | 36 | 26 | — | — | — | — | — |
| 1991–92 | Brynäs IF | SHL | 40 | 15 | 14 | 29 | 20 | 5 | 3 | 1 | 4 | 2 |
| 1992–93 | Brynäs IF | SHL | 38 | 10 | 19 | 29 | 47 | 10 | 5 | 5 | 10 | 4 |
| 1993–94 | Brynäs IF | SHL | 40 | 12 | 15 | 27 | 30 | 7 | 5 | 4 | 9 | 4 |
| 1994–95 | Brynäs IF | SHL | 36 | 11 | 10 | 21 | 26 | 14 | 4 | 6 | 10 | 4 |
| 1995–96 | Brynäs IF | SHL | 11 | 3 | 2 | 5 | 6 | — | — | — | — | — |
| 1996–97 | HIFK | Liiga | 40 | 5 | 9 | 14 | 40 | — | — | — | — | — |
| 1997–98 | Brynäs IF | SHL | 46 | 15 | 19 | 34 | 36 | 3 | 1 | 0 | 1 | 4 |
| 1998–99 | Brynäs IF | SHL | 50 | 21 | 31 | 52 | 52 | 14 | 7 | 8 | 15 | 12 |
| 1999–00 | Brynäs IF | SHL | 48 | 22 | 21 | 43 | 44 | 11 | 3 | 4 | 7 | 14 |
| 2000–01 | Brynäs IF | SHL | 40 | 16 | 21 | 37 | 18 | 4 | 2 | 2 | 4 | 4 |
| 2001–02 | Brynäs IF | SHL | 39 | 16 | 17 | 33 | 61 | 4 | 1 | 2 | 3 | 10 |
| 2002–03 | Brynäs IF | SHL | 48 | 8 | 16 | 24 | 44 | 7 | 0 | 0 | 0 | 0 |
| 2003–04 | Brynäs IF | SHL | 38 | 7 | 15 | 22 | 14 | — | — | — | — | — |
| 2004–05 | Brynäs IF | SHL | 45 | 7 | 8 | 15 | 18 | 10 | 6 | 2 | 8 | 2 |
| 2005–06 | Brynäs IF | SHL | 48 | 5 | 17 | 22 | 46 | 4 | 0 | 1 | 1 | 2 |
| 2006–07 | Brynäs IF | SHL | 50 | 6 | 15 | 21 | 26 | 5 | 0 | 1 | 1 | 0 |
| 2007–08 | Brynäs IF | SHL | 44 | 4 | 12 | 16 | 26 | 10 | 2 | 5 | 7 | 8 |
| 2008–09 | Brynäs IF | SHL | 54 | 8 | 17 | 25 | 22 | 4 | 0 | 1 | 1 | 0 |
| 2009–10 | Brynäs IF | SHL | 53 | 4 | 25 | 29 | 26 | 5 | 1 | 0 | 1 | 4 |
| 2010–11 | LAIK HK | Division 3 | 1 | 1 | 8 | 9 | 0 | — | — | — | — | — |
| SHL totals | | | 770 | 190 | 294 | 484 | 562 | 117 | 40 | 42 | 82 | 74 |
