= Bo Tovland =

Swedish ice hockey coach and executive

- Born: 2 November 1936; Stockholm, Sweden
- Died: 25 September 2015 (aged 78); Stockholm, Sweden
- Occupation(s): Chief executive officer and businessman
- Known for: Swedish Ice Hockey Association vice-president, Sweden men's national ice hockey team manager
- Awards: H. M. The King's Medal; Paul Loicq Award
- Honors: Swedish Hockey Hall of Fame

Bo Tovland (2 November 1936 – 25 September 2015) was a Swedish ice hockey coach and executive. He was the general manager of the Sweden men's national ice hockey team at seven Ice Hockey World Championships, three Winter Olympics and three Canada Cup tournaments. Under his leadership, Sweden won gold in ice hockey at the 1994 Winter Olympics, and three gold medals at the Ice Hockey World Championships. He previously coached the national junior team to a gold medal at the 1981 World Junior Ice Hockey Championships, and won multiple medals coaching the under-18 men's team. He began working for the Swedish Ice Hockey Association in 1961, sat on its board of directors from 1981 to 2002, and was its vice-chairman for eight years. He was also a member of the Swedish Olympic Committee from 1985 to 2005, and was a member of International Ice Hockey Federation committees from 1998 to 2008. Tovland received multiple honors for his career in hockey, which included H. M. The King's Medal in 1996, the Paul Loicq Award for contributions to international ice hockey in 2006, and induction into the Swedish Hockey Hall of Fame in 2012.

== Early life and business career ==
Bo Tovland was born on 2 November 1936 in Stockholm. He worked as a clerk in a bank, was the chief financial officer of Sergel-Byggen AB for ten years, and was the chief executive officer of the property management company Fastighets AB in Stockholm for 23 years. He was involved with the Swedish Table Tennis Association and the Swedish Football Association prior to being an ice hockey administrator. He also served as vice chairman and treasurer of the Swedish Central Association for the Promotion of Sports.

== Ice hockey career ==
Tovland began working for the Swedish Ice Hockey Association (SIHA) in 1961, sat on many of its various committees, and was elected to the Stockholm Ice Hockey Association executive for four years. From 1968 to 1980, he coached the Sweden men's national under-18 ice hockey team at eleven tournaments in the IIHF European Junior Championships, and won three gold, four silver and two bronze medals.

Tovland coached the Sweden men's national junior ice hockey team at five IIHF World Junior Championships from 1975 to 1981, and won one gold, one silver and two bronze medals. At the 1975 World Junior Ice Hockey Championships, felt that Sweden had to adjust its style of play to compete with the dominant Soviet Union national junior ice hockey team, and he added more players to the team with toughness and strength compared to the usual passing and speed. He described the strategy as a hybrid of European and North American styles of play. Tovland felt that the North American professional influence could destroy the European style of game as it has been known, since many junior European players attend hockey camps in Canada and idolized Swedish players in the National Hockey League and the World Hockey Association. Tovland coached the Sweden junior team to its first gold medal at the 1981 World Junior Ice Hockey Championships, which took 31 years for Sweden to repeat as gold medalists.

Tovland was the general manager of the Sweden men's national ice hockey team at seven Ice Hockey World Championships, three Winter Olympics and three Canada Cup tournaments. Under his leadership, Sweden won gold in ice hockey at the 1994 Winter Olympics, and three gold medals at the Ice Hockey World Championships.

Tovland was a member of the SIHA board of directors from 1981 to 2002, and was its vice-chairman for eight years. He served as the general secretary of the Ice Hockey World Championships hosted by Sweden in 1981, 1989 and 1995. He was also a member of the organizing committees for 2002, and both the 2012 and 2013 championships co-hosted by Sweden and Finland.

Tovland sat on the nomination committee of the Swedish Olympic Committee from 1985 to 2005, and was its vice-chairman for 14 years. He was a member of the Riksidrottens Vänner (Friends of the National Sports) from 1992 onwards. He served on the International Ice Hockey Federation's sport development committee from 1998 to 2003, and the Ice Hockey World Championships bid evaluation committee from 1998 to 2008. He served as a deputy to the general secretary for the 2006 IIHF World Championship hosted in Riga, Latvia.

== Honors and awards ==
Tovland was named an honorary member of the SIHA board of directors, received the SIHA Order of Merit in 1986, the SIHA gold medal in 1988, and the Order of Merit from the Swedish Sports Confederation. He received H. M. The King's Medal 8th size in silver with a blue ribbon in 1996. He was awarded the Prince's Plaque by the Swedish Central Association for the Promotion of Sports in 2005. The IIHF named him a recipient of the Paul Loicq Award in 2006, for contributions to international ice hockey. Tovland was inducted into the Swedish Hockey Hall of Fame on 29 October 2012.

== Death and legacy ==
Tovland had a stroke in May 2015, and died on 25 September 2015 in Stockholm. Nicklas Lidström described Tovland as, "a very sympathetic person and a very good team leader for the national team". Markus Näslund felt that "his generation associates Tovland with tre kronor", and that "he was one of the great servants of faith, who devoted large parts of his life to hockey and our national team". Swedish newspaper Expressen described Tovland as one of Sweden's biggest hockey profiles, and that most of Sweden's national stars had been "infected by his humorous and characteristic disposition".
