= Tom Bissett =

American ice hockey player (born 1966)

- Born: March 13, 1966 (age 60) Seattle, Washington, U.S.
- Height: 6 ft 2 in (188 cm)
- Weight: 191 lb (87 kg; 13 st 9 lb)
- Position: Left wing
- Shot: Right
- Played for: Detroit Red Wings
- National team: United States
- NHL draft: 211th overall, 1986; Detroit Red Wings
- Playing career: 1989–2003

Tom Bissett (born March 13, 1966) is an American former professional ice hockey left winger. He grew up playing junior hockey in Lynnwood, Washington before joining the Waterloo Black Hawks, then moving to Michigan Tech on a hockey scholarship. In the 1990–91 season, he played in 5 NHL games for the Detroit Red Wings and he did not register a point. He was more successful in Europe where he played for 12 seasons as well as representing the United States at the 1992 and 1999 IIHF ice hockey world championships.

== Career statistics ==
=== Regular season and playoffs ===
			Regular season					Playoffs
Season	Team	League	GP	G	A	Pts	PIM	GP	G	A	Pts	PIM
1984–85	Waterloo Black Hawks	USHL	48	38	65	103	24	—	—	—	—	—
1985–86	Michigan Tech University	WCHA	40	12	21	33	18	—	—	—	—	—
1986–87	Michigan Tech University	WCHA	40	16	19	35	12	—	—	—	—	—
1987–88	Michigan Tech University	WCHA	41	18	26	44	20	—	—	—	—	—
1988–89	Michigan Tech University	WCHA	42	19	28	47	16	—	—	—	—	—
1988–89	Adirondack Red Wings	AHL	5	0	1	1	0	—	—	—	—	—
1989–90	Adirondack Red Wings	AHL	16	11	4	15	4	—	—	—	—	—
1989–90	Hampton Roads Admirals	ECHL	5	7	7	14	2	—	—	—	—	—
1990–91	Detroit Red Wings	NHL	5	0	0	0	0	—	—	—	—	—
1990–91	Adirondack Red Wings	AHL	73	44	38	82	12	2	0	0	0	0
1991–92	Brynäs IF	SEL	40	25	15	40	32	—	—	—	—	—
1992–93	Brynäs IF	SEL	40	21	11	32	20	10	7	1	8	8
1993–94	SC Rapperswil–Jona	SUI.2	36	24	24	48	—	—	—	—	—	—
1994–95	SC Rapperswil–Jona	NDA	33	12	15	27	18	6	4	3	7	2
1995–96	TuS Geretsried	GER.2	31	26	37	63	18	—	—	—	—	—
1995–96	Kaufbeurer Adler	DEL	1	0	1	1	0	—	—	—	—	—
1995–96	HC La Chaux–de–Fonds	SUI.2	5	1	4	5	6	—	—	—	—	—
1995–96	Houston Aeros	IHL	3	0	0	0	0	—	—	—	—	—
1996–97	HIFK	SM-l	50	14	9	23	26	—	—	—	—	—
1997–98	Star Bulls Rosenheim GmbH	DEL	34	10	14	24	20	—	—	—	—	—
1997–98	SC Rapperswil–Jona	NDA	9	2	3	5	4	2	0	2	2	2
1998–99	Brynäs IF	SEL	50	40	12	52	30	14	6	2	8	4
1999–2000	Brynäs IF	SEL	50	15	37	52	55	11	3	2	5	0
2000–01	Brynäs IF	SEL	50	21	17	38	30	4	3	1	4	0
2001–02	Brynäs IF	SEL	50	14	15	29	24	4	1	2	3	6
2002–03	Tappara	SM-l	45	11	13	24	6	15	4	0	4	4
SEL totals			280	136	107	243	191	43	20	8	28	18
NDA totals			42	14	18	32	22	8	4	5	9	4
SM-l totals			95	25	22	47	32	15	4	0	4	4

=== International ===
Year	Team	Event	GP	G	A	Pts	PIM
1992	United States	WC	6	1	0	1	0
1999	United States	WC	6	3	0	3	0
Senior totals			12	4	0	4	0
