= 1930–31 Elitserien season =

Swedish ice hockey league season

The 1930–31 Elitserien season was the fourth season of the Elitserien, the top level ice hockey league in Sweden. Seven teams participated in the league, and Sodertalje SK won the league championship.

== Final standings ==
	Team	GP	W	T	L	+/-	P
1	Södertälje SK	6	5	1	0	9 - 3	11
2	Hammarby IF	6	3	1	2	12 - 8	7
3	Nacka SK	6	3	1	2	14 - 11	7
4	IK Göta	6	3	1	2	9 - 6	7
5	AIK	6	1	4	1	16 - 9	6
6	Djurgårdens IF	6	1	1	4	2 - 6	3
7	Karlbergs BK	6	0	1	5	6 - 25	1
