= 1929–30 Elitserien season =

Swedish ice hockey league season

The 1929–30 Elitserien season was the third season of the Elitserien, the top level ice hockey league in Sweden. Six teams participated in the league, and IK Gota won the league championship for the third year in a row.

== Final standings ==
	Team	GP	W	T	L	+/-	P
1	IK Göta	3	2	1	0	31 - 1	5
2	Södertälje SK	3	2	0	1	3 - 2	4
3	Djurgårdens IF	3	1	1	1	6 - 4	3
4	Hammarby IF	3	1	1	1	7 - 6	3
5	Nacka SK	3	1	1	1	4 - 4	3
6	Karlbergs BK	3	0	0	3	5 - 11	0
