= 1933–34 Elitserien season =

Swedish ice hockey league season

The 1933–34 Elitserien season was the seventh season of the Elitserien, the top level ice hockey league in Sweden. Eight teams participated in the league, and Hammarby IF won the league championship.

== Final standings ==
	Team	GP	W	T	L	+/-	P
1	Hammarby IF	14	11	0	3	41 - 20	22
2	AIK	14	9	2	3	38 - 12	20
3	Södertälje SK	14	9	2	3	29 - 16	20
4	UoIF Matteuspojkarna	14	6	4	4	19 - 21	16
5	IK Göta	14	7	1	6	30 - 19	15
6	Nacka SK	14	4	2	8	15 - 27	10
7	IFK Stockholm	14	1	3	10	11 - 41	5
8	Djurgårdens IF	14	2	0	12	12 - 39	4
