= Stig-Göran Johansson =

Swedish ice hockey player

- Born: 18 July 1943 Surahammar, Sweden
- Died: 20 April 2002 (aged 58)
- Height: 5 ft 8 in (173 cm)
- Weight: 154 lb (70 kg; 11 st 0 lb)
- Position: Right wing
- Shot: Left
- Played for: Södertälje SK
- National team: Sweden
- NHL draft: Undrafted
- Playing career: 1963–1978

Stig-Göran Johansson (18 July 1943 – 20 April 2002) was a Swedish professional ice hockey player.

He competed as a member of the Sweden men's national ice hockey team at the 1972 Winter Olympics held in Japan.

On 17 May 2012, Stig-Göranson was elected into the Swedish Hockey Hall of Fame.
