= 1935–36 Svenska Serien season =

Swedish ice hockey league season

The 1935–36 Svenska Serien season was the first season of the Svenska Serien, the top level ice hockey league in Sweden. AIK won the first league championship.

== Final standings ==
	Team	GP	W	T	L	+/-	P
1	AIK	7	6	0	1	26 - 23	12
2	Södertälje SK	7	4	2	1	12 - 14	10
3	Södertälje IF	7	3	3	2	8 - 11	8
4	Hammarby IF	7	3	1	3	13 - 7	7
5	IK Göta	7	3	0	4	11 - 14	6
6	Reymersholms IK	7	2	1	4	12 - 16	5
7	IK Hermes	7	2	1	4	5 - 15	5
8	Karlbergs BK	7	0	3	4	9 - 16	3
