= 1927–28 Elitserien season =

Swedish ice hockey league season

The 1927–28 Elitserien season was the first season of the Elitserien, the top level ice hockey league in Sweden. Four teams participated in the league, and IK Göta won the inaugural championship.

== Final standings ==
	Team	GP	W	T	L	+/-	P
1	IK Göta	6	5	0	1	24 - 15	10
2	Södertälje SK	6	4	0	2	23 - 5	8
3	Hammarby IF	6	2	0	4	18 - 20	4
4	Lidingö IF	6	1	0	5	13 - 32	2
