= 1931–32 Elitserien season =

Swedish ice hockey league season

The 1931–32 Elitserien season was the fifth season of the Elitserien, the top level ice hockey league in Sweden. Eight teams participated in the league, and AIK won the league championship.

== Final standings ==
	Team	GP	W	T	L	+/-	P
1	AIK	14	11	1	2	42 - 12	23
2	Hammarby IF	14	9	3	2	37 - 13	21
3	Södertälje SK	14	6	4	4	18 - 12	16
4	IK Göta	14	5	3	6	22 - 24	13
5	Djurgårdens IF	14	4	3	7	18 - 26	11
6	IK Hermes	14	4	3	7	17 - 38	11
7	Karlbergs BK	14	4	2	8	26 - 36	10
8	Nacka SK	14	1	5	8	12 - 31	7
