= 1932–33 Elitserien season =

Swedish ice hockey league season

The 1932–33 Elitserien season was the sixth season of the Elitserien, the top level ice hockey league in Sweden. Eight teams participated in the league, and Hammarby IF unseated AIK as league champions.

== Final standings ==
	Team	GP	W	T	L	+/-	P
1	Hammarby IF	14	10	2	2	43 - 9	22
2	AIK	14	10	2	2	38 - 13	22
3	IK Göta	14	9	4	1	29 - 12	22
4	Djurgårdens IF	14	6	1	7	24 - 29	13
5	Södertälje SK	14	5	2	7	17 - 16	12
6	UoIF Matteuspojkarna	14	4	3	7	12 - 29	10
7	Tranebergs IF	14	3	1	10	11 - 35	7
8	IK Hermes	14	1	2	11	7 - 38	4
