= 1937–38 Svenska Serien season =

Swedish ice hockey league season

The 1937-38 Svenksa Serien season was the third season of the Svenska Serien, the top level ice hockey league in Sweden. AIK won the league for the third year in a row.

== Final standings ==
	Team	GP	W	T	L	+/-	P
1	AIK	14	13	1	0	47 - 7	27
2	Hammarby IF	14	11	2	1	39 - 8	24
3	IK Göta	14	9	1	4	27 - 14	19
4	Södertälje SK	14	5	1	8	12 - 24	11
5	Södertälje IF	14	5	0	9	20 - 26	10
6	Karlbergs BK	14	4	1	9	17 - 25	9
7	IFK Mariefred	14	3	1	10	10 - 44	7
8	Tranebergs IF	14	1	3	10	7 - 31	5
