= 1943–44 Svenska Serien season =

Swedish ice hockey league season

The 1943–44 Svenska Serien season was the ninth and final season of the Svenska Serien, the top level ice hockey league in Sweden. It was replaced by the Swedish Division I for 1944–45. Hammarby IF won the Svenska Serien for the sixth straight year.

== Final standings ==
	Team	GP	W	T	L	+/-	P
1	Hammarby IF	14	10	3	1	68 - 23	23
2	AIK	14	10	3	1	56 - 24	23
3	IK Göta	14	7	4	3	45 - 26	18
4	Nacka SK	14	7	0	7	38 - 37	14
5	Södertälje SK	14	5	2	7	28 - 28	12
6	Karlbergs BK	14	4	1	9	35 - 39	9
7	Reymersholms IK	14	3	2	9	24 - 26	8
8	Brynäs IF	14	1	3	10	30 - 93	5
