= Hockeytvåan =

Fourth tier of ice hockey in Sweden

Hockeytvåan (Division 2)
- Sport: Ice hockey
- Founded: 1941
- Country: Sweden
- Promotion to: Hockeyettan
- Relegation to: Hockeytrean

Hockeytvåan is the fourth tier of ice hockey in Sweden. It previously operated as the second-level league from 1941 to 1975, and the third-level league from 1975 to 1999.

== Format ==
The league is divided into 11 regional groups. The top teams in Division 2 are promoted to the third-level Hockeyettan, while the bottom teams are relegated to the fifth-level Hockeytrean.

Groups:

- Stockholm norra
- Stockholm södra
- Norra A
- Norra B
- Norra C
- Norra D
- Södra A
- Södra B
- Södra C
- Västra A
- Västra B

== History ==
Division 2 was the second highest level of ice hockey in Sweden until 1975, when it became the third tier due to the formation of Elitserien (now called the SHL). After Allsvenskan was spun off into a separate second-tier league in 1999, Division 2 became the fourth tier.

=== List of seasons as second tier ===
| Year | # of clubs | # of groups | First place | Promoted to first tier | Relegated to lower tier |
|---|---|---|---|---|---|
| 1941–42 | 18 | 3 | UoIF Matteuspojkarna (north); IF Aros (central); IFK Mariefred (south) | IFK Mariefred; UoIF Matteuspojkarna | none |
| 1942–43 | 26 | 4 | Brynäs IF (north); IF Aros (central); Nacka SK (east); Årsta SK (south) | Brynäs IF; Nacka SK | IFK Stockholm |
| 1943–44 | | | | | |
| 1944–45 | | | | | |
| 1945–46 | | | | | |
| 1946–47 | | | | | |
| 1947–48 | | | | | |
| 1948–49 | | | | | |
| 1949–50 | | | | | |
| 1950–51 | | | | | |
| 1951–52 | | | | | |
| 1952–53 | | | | | |
| 1953–54 | | | | | |
| 1954–55 | | | | | |
| 1955–56 | | | | | |
| 1956–57 | | | | | |
| 1957–58 | | | | | |
| 1958–59 | | | | | |
| 1959–60 | | | | | |
| 1960–61 | | | | | |
| 1961–62 | | | | | |
| 1962–63 | | | | | |
| 1963–64 | | | | | |
| 1964–65 | | | | | |
| 1965–66 | | | | | |
| 1966–67 | | | | | |
| 1967–68 | | | | | |
| 1968–69 | | | | | |
| 1969–70 | | | | | |
| 1970–71 | | | | | |
| 1971–72 | | | | | |
| 1972–73 | | | | | |
| 1973–74 | | | | | |
| 1974–75 | | | | | |

== See also ==
- List of ice hockey leagues in Sweden
