= 1941–42 Svenska Serien season =

Swedish ice hockey league season

The 1941–42 Svenska Serien season was the seventh season of the Svenska Serien, the top level ice hockey league in Sweden. Hammarby IF won the league for the fourth straight year.

== Final standings ==
| | Team | GP | W | T | L | +/- | P |
|---|---|---|---|---|---|---|---|
| 1 | Hammarby IF | 14 | 12 | 1 | 1 | 52 - 13 | 25 |
| 2 | Södertälje SK | 14 | 10 | 3 | 1 | 47 - 13 | 23 |
| 3 | IK Göta | 14 | 9 | 1 | 4 | 51 - 24 | 19 |
| 4 | Reymersholms IK | 14 | 8 | 2 | 4 | 38 - 23 | 18 |
| 5 | AIK | 14 | 6 | 0 | 8 | 37 - 33 | 12 |
| 6 | Karlbergs BK | 14 | 2 | 3 | 9 | 22 - 50 | 8 |
| 7 | Nacka SK | 14 | 2 | 11 | 11 | 16 - 52 | 5 |
| 8 | IK Hermes | 14 | 1 | 0 | 16 | 16 - 30 | 2 |
