= 1944–45 Swedish Division I season =

Swedish ice hockey season

The 1944–45 Swedish Division I season was the first season of Swedish Division I. Hammarby IF defeated Sodertalje SK in the league final, 2 games to 1.

== Regular season ==
=== Northern Group ===
	Team	GP	W	T	L	+/-	P
1	Södertälje SK	10	10	0	0	94–18	20
2	AIK	9	7	0	2	49–16	14
3	Karlbergs BK	10	6	0	4	69–36	12
4	Tranebergs IF	10	4	0	6	42–61	8
5	Sandvikens IF	10	1	1	8	32–88	3
6	Surahammars IF	9	0	1	8	14–81	1

=== Southern Group ===
	Team	GP	W	T	L	+/-	P
1	Hammarby IF	10	9	1	0	102–9	19
2	Nacka SK	10	7	0	3	62–35	14
3	IK Göta	10	6	1	3	47–43	13
4	IFK Mariefred	10	3	2	5	37–52	8
5	Skuru IK	10	2	0	8	33–56	6
6	IF Göta	10	0	0	10	24–101	0

== Final ==
- Södertälje SK – Hammarby IF 4–2, 1–2, 4–5
