= Arne Strömberg =

Swedish ice hockey coach

- Born: 20 June 1920; Royal Karlskrona Admiralty Parish, Sweden
- Died: 25 January 1988 (aged 67); Järfälla Parish, Sweden
- Occupation: ice hockey coach

Arne Strömberg (20 June 1920, in Karlskrona, Sweden – 25 January 1988) was a Swedish ice hockey coach. He coached the Sweden national men's ice hockey team and several Swedish hockey clubs during his career.

He resigned after the 1971 World Championship, following Sweden's defeat, 1-2, against West Germany. He was replaced by Billy Harris.

Strömberg was inducted into the IIHF Hall of Fame in 1998, and into the Swedish Hockey Hall of Fame in 2012.
