= Elitserien (1927–1935) =

Ice hockey league in Sweden

- Sport: Ice hockey
- Founded: 1927
- Folded: 1935
- No. of teams: 4-8
- Country: Sweden
- Most titles: IK Göta; Hammarby IF (3)

The Elitserien was the top level ice hockey league in Sweden from 1927–1935. It existed alongside the Swedish Championship, where the national champion was crowned. It was replaced by Svenska Serien in the 1935–36 season.

== Champions ==
Season	Winners
1927-28	IK Göta
1928-29	IK Göta
1929-30	IK Göta
1930-31	Södertälje SK
1931-32	AIK
1932-33	Hammarby IF
1933-34	Hammarby IF
1934-35	Hammarby IF
