= 1942–43 Svenska Serien season =

Swedish ice hockey league season

The 1942–43 Svenska Serien season was the eighth season of the Svenska Serien, the top level ice hockey league in Sweden. The series was never completed due to harsh weather conditions. Hammarby had however already clinched first place in the league for the fifth straight season.

== Final standings ==
	Team	GP	W	T	L	+/-	P
1	Hammarby IF	13	10	1	2	59 - 14	21
2	AIK	14	9	2	3	40 - 26	20
3	Södertälje SK	13	6	5	2	35 - 17	17
4	IK Göta	14	8	1	5	38 - 27	17
5	Karlbergs BK	13	4	2	7	28 - 45	10
6	Reymersholms IK	14	4	1	9	20 - 37	9
7	IFK Mariefred	10	2	1	7	14 - 39	5
8	UoIF Matteuspojkarna	13	1	3	9	28 - 57	5
