= Hans Wallson =

Swedish ice hockey player and coach

- Born: September 20, 1966 (age 58); Sweden
- Height: 5 ft 11 in (180 cm)
- Weight: 181 lb (82 kg; 12 st 13 lb)
- Position: Forward
- Shot: Left
- NHL draft: undrafted
- Playing career: 1983–2005

Hans Wallson (born September 20, 1966) is a Swedish ice hockey coach and former professional ice hockey player. He served as head coach of the ZSC Lions of the Swiss top-flight National League A (NLA) until December 29, 2017.

== Career ==
Wallson spent most of his playing career in his hometown of Kiruna, turning out for IFK Kiruna and Kiruna HC. He made 62 appearances in Sweden's second division Allsvenskan, but mostly played in the third division. In the final years of his playing career, which ended in 2005, Wallson got into coaching. In 2009, he took up a coaching role in the youth ranks of SHL’s Skellefteå AIK and was installed as head coach of the club's SHL side following the sacking of Anders Forsberg in February 2013. Wallson guided Skellefteå to its first Swedish championship title since 1978.

In his first full season at the Skellefteå helm (2013–14), he led the team to another national championship, while being named Coach of the Year by the association of Swedish ice hockey writers.

The 2014–15 season saw Skellefteå secure another trip to the SHL finals, where they fell short to the Växjö Lakers. He also coached the team to a semi-final appearance in the Champions Hockey League and received SHL Coach of the Year honors at the 2015 SHL Awards.

In 2015–16, Skellefteå won the SHL regular season championship for the fourth straight year. Wallson's squad advanced to the finals but was defeated by Frölunda HC. In the Champions Hockey League quarterfinals, they were eliminated by HC Davos.

In April 2016, he was named head coach of the ZSC Lions of the Swiss National League A (NLA). In the 2016–17 season, he guided the Lions to a second-place finish in the regular season, before falling short to Lugano in the playoff quarterfinals. Wallson was sacked for lack of success on December 29, 2017. At the time, the ZSC Lions were sitting in seventh place in the league.
