= 1939–40 Svenska Serien season =

Swedish ice hockey league season

The 1939–40 Svenska Serien season was the fifth season of the Svenska Serien, the top level ice hockey league in Sweden. Hammarby IF won the league title for the second consecutive season.

== Final standings ==
	Team	GP	W	T	L	+/-	P
1	Hammarby IF	14	10	3	1	47 - 13	23
2	AIK	14	9	3	2	50 - 16	21
3	IK Göta	14	7	4	3	27 - 17	18
4	Södertälje SK	14	6	1	7	20 - 25	13
5	Karlbergs BK	14	5	1	8	30 - 39	11
6	IK Sture	14	4	3	7	23 - 27	11
7	Nacka SK	14	3	2	9	25 - 49	8
8	Södertälje IF	14	2	3	9	12 - 39	7
