= Tommy Sandlin =

Swedish ice hockey coach (1944–2006)

- Born: 31 March 1944; Hemlingby, Gävle, Sweden
- Died: 27 December 2006 (aged 62); Hemlingby, Gävle, Sweden
- Occupation: ice hockey coach

Tommy Sandlin (31 March 1944 – 27 December 2006) was a Swedish professional ice hockey coach. He led Sweden to victory at the 1987 World Ice Hockey Championship, and was nicknamed "The Hockey Professor" for his tactical skills.
