= Brynäs IF =

Sports club in Gävle, Sweden

- City: Gävle, Sweden
- League: SHL
- Founded: 12 May 1912; 113 years ago
- Home arena: Monitor ERP Arena
- Colors
- General manager: Johan Alcén
- Head coach: Niklas Gällstedt
- Captain: Johan Larsson
- Website: brynas.se

Championships
- Regular season titles: (6) (1974, 1975, 1976, 1977, 1978, 2025)
- Le Mat Trophy: (13) (1964, 1966, 1967, 1968, 1970, 1971, 1972, 1976, 1977, 1980, 1993, 1999, 2012)

Brynäs IF is a Swedish professional ice hockey team from Gävle. The club currently plays in the Swedish Hockey League (SHL), promoted from the HockeyAllsvenskan, the second tier of ice hockey in Sweden, following the 2023–24 season. The club played in the top-tier Swedish league from 1960 to 2023 (1960-75 called Division I, 1975-2023 called the SHL), a total of 63 seasons, longer than any other Swedish club, before suffering relegation for the first time in franchise history at the conclusion of the 2022–23 season. They have won the Swedish championship 13 times, second only to Djurgården with 16 wins. In the 2023/2024 Hockeyallsvenskan season Brynäs won promotion back to the SHL after beating Djurgården 4–0 in the final.

== History ==
Brynäs IF was formed by Nils Norin, Ferdinand Blomkvist, and Thure Ternström on 12 May 1912 and began to play ice hockey in 1939. The club has also competed in soccer, athletics, bandy, swimming, and water polo. The team played in the hockey league's top flight from 1960 to 2023 and has won the Swedish championship 13 times, most recently in 2012.

Brynäs IF became the world's first ice hockey club to collaborate with the United Nations Program UNICEF, after signing a five-year contract with the organisation on 20 November 2013 (expiring in 2018). On 3 June 2014, the club also signed a five-year contract with Gävle Municipality (expiring after the 2018–19 season). The municipality acquired the naming rights for the club's home arena and renamed it Gavlerinken Arena. The latter collaboration also meant the municipality would pay the club to play with ad-free jerseys, starting in the 2014–15 season, as the only SHL team. The arena is since September 2019 named Monitor ERP Arena.

In 2021, after finishing 13th (out of 14 teams) in the regular season, the team was forced to defend its SHL status for the first time since 2008, playing a best-of-seven series against the last-placed team, HV71, with home advantage. At the conclusion of the 2022–23 season, Brynäs was relegated from the SHL for the first time in franchise history, after losing the relegation playout series, 1–4, to the Malmö Redhawks. They returned to the SHL after the 2023–24 season.

== Season-by-season ==
This is a partial list, featuring the five most recent completed seasons. For a more complete list, see List of Brynäs IF seasons.

Season	Level	Division	Record		Attendance	Notes
Season	Level	Division	Position	W–OTW–OTL–L	Attendance	Notes
2020–21	Tier 1	SHL	13th	14–4–7–27	150	
2020–21	Play Out		—	2–1	—	Won 4–1 vs HV71
2021–22	Tier 1	SHL	10th	17–6–6–23	4,544	
2021–22	Eighth-finals		—	1–2	5,374	Lost 1–2 vs Örebro HK
2022–23	Tier 1	SHL	13th	16–4–6–26	6,357	
2022–23	Play Out		—	1–4	7,050	Lost 1–4 vs Malmö Redhawks ▼ Relegated to HockeyAllsvenskan
2023–24	Tier 2	HockeyAllsvenskan	1st	33–5–3–11	6,442	
2023–24	Allsvenskan playoffs		—	12–1	7,109	Won in Quarterfinals, 4–0 vs Nybro Vikings; Won in Semifinals, 4–1 vs BIK Karlskoga; Won in Finals 4–0 vs Djurgårdens IF promoted to SHL
2024–25	Tier 1	SHL	1st	26–8–3–15	7,700	
2024–25	Swedish Championship playoffs		—	10–7	7,873	Won in Quarterfinals, 4–2 vs Malmö Redhawks; Won in Semifinals, 4–1 vs Skellefteå AIK; Lost in Finals 2–4 vs Luleå HF

== Players and personnel ==
=== Current roster ===
No.	Nat	Player	Pos	S/G	Age	Acquired	Birthplace
29	(Sweden)	Axel Andersson	D	R	26	2024	Järna, Sweden
19	(Sweden)	Nicklas Bäckström	C	L	38	2025	Valbo, Sweden
81	(United States)	Kieffer Bellows	LW	L	27	2025	Edina, Minnesota, United States
15	(Sweden)	Simon Bertilsson	D	L	34	2020	Karlskoga, Sweden
45	(Italy)	Damian Clara	G	L	21	2025	Brunico, Italy
61	(United States)	Collin Delia	G	L	31	2025	Rancho Cucamonga, California, United States
3	(Sweden)	Christian Djoos	D	L	31	2024	Gothenburg, Sweden
14	(Sweden)	Robert Hägg	D	L	31	2025	Uppsala, Sweden
71	(Sweden)	Axel Jonsson-Fjällby	LW	L	28	2025	Stockholm, Sweden
31	(Sweden)	Erik Källgren	G	L	29	2024	Stockholm, Sweden
5	(Czech Republic)	Michal Kempný	D	L	35	2025	Hodonin, Czech Republic
28	(Sweden)	Johannes Kinnvall	D	R	28	2022	Gävle, Sweden
52	(United States)	Jack Kopacka	RW	L	28	2023	Metamora, Michigan, United States
10	(Sweden)	Johan Larsson (C)	C	L	33	2022	Lau, Sweden
37	(Sweden)	Hugo Lejon	RW	R	20	2024	Västerås, Sweden
23	(Sweden)	Oskar Lindblom	LW	L	29	2024	Gävle, Sweden
27	(Sweden)	Mattias Norlinder	D	L	25	2025	Kramfors, Sweden
36	(Sweden)	Linus Ölund (A)	C	L	28	2019	Gävle, Sweden
47	(Sweden)	Lucas Pettersson	C	L	19	2025	Örnsköldsvik, Sweden
18	(Sweden)	Anton Rödin (A)	RW	L	35	2019	Stockholm, Sweden
41	(Canada)	Greg Scott	C	R	37	2019	Victoria, British Columbia, Canada
33	(Sweden)	Jakob Silfverberg	RW	R	35	2024	Gävle, Sweden
8	(United States)	Bobby Trivigno	LW	L	27	2024	Setauket, New York, United States
20	(United States)	Tyler Vesel	C	R	31	2023	Duluth, Minnesota, United States

Updated 22 August 2025

=== Team captains ===
- Jan Larsson (1999–2003)
- Tommy Sjödin (2003–2008)
- Andreas Dackell (2008–2012)
- Jakob Silfverberg (2012)
- Jörgen Sundqvist (2012–2014)
- Niclas Andersén (2014–2015)
- Anton Rödin (2015–2016)
- Jacob Blomqvist (2016–2019)
- Anton Rödin (2019–2023)
- Johan Larsson (2023–)

=== Head coaches ===
- Axel Svensson (1943–1944)
- Conny Eriksson (1954–1957)
- Arne Backman (1960–1961)
- Nils Bergström (1961–1963)
- Herbert Pettersson (1963–1966)
- Börje Mattsson (1966–1967)
- Nils Bergström (1967–1969)
- Tommy Sandlin (1969–1977)
- Rolf Andersson (1977–1979)
- Lennart Johansson (1979–1980)
- Tord Lundström (1980–1981)
- Lennart Johansson (1981–1982)
- Stig Salming (1982–1987)
- Tord Lundström (1987–1988)
- Staffan Tholson (1988–1991)
- Tommy Sandlin (1991–1996)
- Göran Sjöberg (1996–1998)
- Roger Melin (1998–2002)
- Esko Nokelainen (2002)
- Gunnar Persson (2002–2004)
- Tomas Jonsson (2004)
- Roger Kyrö (2004–2005)
- Wayne Fleming (2005–2005)
- Leif Boork (2005–2007)
- Olof Östblom (2007–2008)
- Tomas Thelin (2008)
- Leif Boork (2008)
- Niklas Czarnecki (2008–2011)
- Tommy Jonsson (2011–2014)
- Thomas Berglund (2014–2017)
- Roger Melin (2017)
- Tommy Sjödin (2017–2018)
- Magnus Sundquist (2018–2020)
- Peter Andersson (2020–2021)
- Mikko Manner (2021–2023)
- Ove Molin (2023)
- Niklas Gällstedt (2023–)

== Club records and leaders ==
=== Individual season records ===
- Most Goals in a season: Tom Bissett, 40 (1998–99)
- Most Assists in a season: Jan Larsson, 43 (1998–99)
- Most Points in a season: Lars-Göran Nilsson, 62 (1970–71)
- Most Penalty Minutes in a season: Tommy Melkersson, 118 (1996–97)
- Most Points in a season, defenseman: Pär Djoos, 48 (1998–99)

=== Scoring leaders ===
These are the top-ten point-scorers in SHL history. Figures are updated after each completed SHL regular season.

Note: Pos = Position; GP = Games played; G = Goals; A = Assists; Pts = Points; P/G = Points per game; = current Brynäs IF player

Points
Player	Pos	GP	G	A	Pts	P/G
Lars-Göran Nilsson	F	425	273	257	530	1.25
Håkan Wickberg	F	363	253	241	494	1.36
Tord Lundström	F	367	261	232	493	1.34
Ove Molin	RW	772	192	295	487	.63
Jan Larsson	C	598	189	281	470	.79
Stefan Karlsson	F	428	252	140	392	.92
Anders Huss	C	574	189	183	372	.65
Andreas Dackell	RW	524	132	217	349	.67
Tommy Sjödin	D	681	117	198	315	.46
Hans Lindberg	F	246	209	105	314	1.28

== Trophies and awards ==
=== Team ===
Le Mat Trophy

- 1963–64, 1965–66, 1966–67, 1967–68, 1969–70, 1970–71, 1971–72, 1975–76, 1976–77, 1979–80, 1992–93, 1998–99, 2011–12

=== Individual ===
Coach of the Year

- Tommy Sandlin: 1991–92, 1992–93
- Roger Melin: 1998–99

Guldhjälmen

- Jan Larsson: 1998–99
- Jakob Silfverberg: 2011–2012

Guldpucken

- Håkan Wickberg: 1970–71
- William Löfqvist: 1971–72
- Stig Östling: 1974–75
- Mats Näslund: 1979–80
- Tommy Sjödin: 1991–92

Håkan Loob Trophy

- Kenneth Andersson: 1983–84
- Evgeny Davydov: 1996–97
- Tom Bissett: 1998–99
- Jan Larsson: 1999–00

Honken Trophy

- Johan Holmqvist: 2005–06
- Jacob Markström: 2009–10

Rinkens Riddare

- Lars Bylund: 1968–69
- Håkan Wickberg: 1969–70
- Jan-Erik Lyck: 1971–72

Rookie of the Year

- Nicklas Bäckström: 2005–06
- Jacob Markström: 2009–10
- Mattias Ekholm: 2010–11
- Johan Larsson:2011-12

Preceded by Djurgårdens IF	Swedish ice hockey champions 1964	Succeeded by Västra Frölunda IF
Preceded by Västra Frölunda IF	Swedish ice hockey champions 1966, 1967, 1968	Succeeded by Leksands IF
Preceded by Leksands IF	Swedish ice hockey champions 1970, 1971, 1972	Succeeded by Leksands IF
Preceded by Leksands IF	Swedish ice hockey champions 1976, 1977	Succeeded by Skellefteå AIK
Preceded by Modo AIK	Swedish ice hockey champions 1980	Succeeded by Färjestad BK
Preceded by Malmö IF	Swedish ice hockey champions 1993	Succeeded by Malmö IF
Preceded by Färjestad BK	Swedish ice hockey champions 1999	Succeeded by Djurgårdens IF
Preceded by Färjestad BK	Swedish ice hockey champions 2012	Succeeded by Skellefteå AIK
