= Svenska Serien (ice hockey) =

- Sport: Ice hockey
- Founded: 1935
- Folded: 1944
- No. of teams: 8
- Country: Sweden
- Most titles: Hammarby IF (6)

The Svenska Serien was the top level ice hockey league in Sweden from 1935–1944. It existed alongside the Swedish Ice Hockey Championship, where the national champion was crowned. It was replaced by the Division I for the 1944–45 season.

== Champions ==
Season	Winners
1935-36	AIK
1936-37	AIK
1937-38	AIK
1938-39	Hammarby IF
1939-40	Hammarby IF
1940-41	Hammarby IF
1941-42	Hammarby IF
1942-43	Hammarby IF
1943-44	Hammarby IF
